= 2006 Ironman World Championship =

The 2006 Ironman World Championship was a long distance triathlon competition that was held on October 21, 2006 in Kailua-Kona, Hawaii. It was the 30th edition of the Ironman World Championship, which has been held annually in Hawaii since 1978. The championship was organized by the World Triathlon Corporation (WTC).

== Championship results ==
=== Men ===
| Pos. | Time (h:mm:ss) | Name | Country | Split times (h:mm:ss / m:ss) | | | | |
| Pos. | Time (h:mm:ss) | Name | Country | Swim | T1 | Bike | T2 | Run |
|---|---|---|---|---|---|---|---|---|
| Gold medal | 8:11:56 | Normann Stadler | Germany | 54:05 | 2:07 | 4:18:23 | 2:20 | 2:55:03 |
| Silver medal | 8:13:07 | Chris McCormack | Australia | 53:51 | 1:51 | 4:29:24 | 2:02 | 2:46:02 |
| Bronze medal | 8:19:04 | Faris Al-Sultan | Germany | 53:36 | 2:04 | 4:29:37 | 3:05 | 2:50:44 |
| 4 | 8:21:04 | Rutger Beke | Belgium | 54:35 | 2:13 | 4:33:33 | 2:30 | 2:48:16 |
| 5 | 8:22:28 | Eneko Llanos | Spain | 53:45 | 2:02 | 4:29:26 | 2:18 | 2:55:00 |
| 6 | 8:24:17 | Marino Vanhoenacker | Belgium | 54:04 | 1:55 | 4:29:13 | 2:07 | 2:56:59 |
| 7 | 8:24:26 | Luke Bell | Australia | 53:57 | 1:44 | 4:29:34 | 2:17 | 2:56:55 |
| 8 | 8:25:22 | Cameron Brown | New Zealand | 53:55 | 1:52 | 4:29:26 | 2:06 | 2:58:05 |
| 9 | 8:27:37 | Chris Lieto | United States | 53:48 | 2:13 | 4:25:35 | 3:16 | 3:02:47 |
| 10 | 8:28:13 | Patrick Vernay | New Caledonia | 54:36 | 2:00 | 4:36:12 | 2:39 | 2:52:48 |

=== Women ===
| Pos. | Time (h:mm:ss) | Name | Country | Split times (h:mm:ss / m:ss) | | | | |
| Pos. | Time (h:mm:ss) | Name | Country | Swim | T1 | Bike | T2 | Run |
|---|---|---|---|---|---|---|---|---|
| Gold medal | 9:18:31 | Michellie Jones | Australia | 54:29 | 1:59 | 5:06:09 | 2:48 | 3:13:08 |
| Silver medal | 9:24:02 | Desiree Ficker | United States | 1:01:46 | 2:08 | 5:05:06 | 3:14 | 3:11:50 |
| Bronze medal | 9:25:18 | Lisa Bentley | Canada | 1:01:31 | 1:53 | 5:10:32 | 2:30 | 3:08:54 |
| 4 | 9:27:24 | Gina Kehr | United States | 54:02 | 2:11 | 5:16:11 | 2:33 | 3:12:29 |
| 5 | 9:30:22 | Kate Allen | Austria | 59:48 | 2:20 | 5:10:34 | 2:51 | 3:14:51 |
| 6 | 9:31:53 | Kate Major | Australia | 1:01:34 | 2:17 | 5:08:24 | 1:54 | 3:17:46 |
| 7 | 9:32:48 | Joanna Lawn | New Zealand | 59:48 | 2:03 | 5:10:20 | 2:22 | 3:18:17 |
| 8 | 9:35:48 | Belinda Granger | Australia | 59:44 | 2:13 | 5:01:45 | 6:18 | 3:25:50 |
| 9 | 9:38:22 | Melissa Ashton | Australia | 59:46 | 2:06 | 5:10:42 | 3:13 | 3:22:37 |
| 10 | 9:38:52 | Natascha Badmann | Switzerland | 1:06:43 | 2:26 | 4:59:04 | 2:47 | 3:27:54 |
