= Ironman Sweden =

Ironman triathlon held in Kalmar, Sweden

Coordinates: 56°39′58″N 16°22′12″E

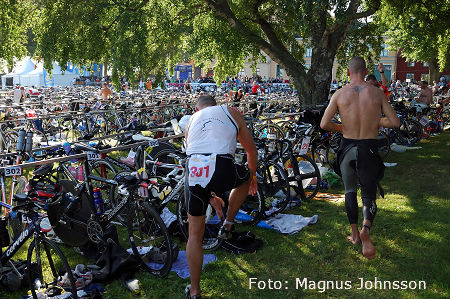
Kalmar Triathlon 2009

Ironman Sweden, also known as Ironman Kalmar or the Kalmar Triathlon, is an Ironman triathlon held in Kalmar, Sweden. It is the only Ironman-branded iron distance event in Sweden and also serves as the Swedish national championship.

The distance is the same as other Ironman triathlons races: 3.86 kilometres (2.40 mi) open water swimming, 180 kilometres (110 mi) cycling and a 42.2-kilometre (26.2 mi) marathon. The start, transition and finish is located in the city of Kalmar.

The swim takes place in the Kalmar Strait, Baltic Sea. The bike course consists of two loops; the first loop goes on Öland and is 122 kilometres (76 mi) and the second loop is 58 kilometres (36 mi) and travels north through to Rockneby. The running segment is a three-loop course that travels northwards partly along the shore.

In December 2011, World Triathlon Corporation purchased the Kalmar Triathlon and rebranded the event as an Ironman triathlon.

== Results ==
=== Men ===
Year	Gold	Time	Silver	Time	Bronze	Time
2012	Jan Raphael (GER)	8:04:01	Dorian Wagner (GER)	8:08:06	Horst Reiche (GER)	8:10:12
2013	Pedro Gomes (POR)	8:19:30	David Pleše (SLO)	8:22:01	Anton Blokhin (UKR)	8:26:09
2014	Horst Reichel (GER)	8:13:01	Wiktor Sjemzew (UKR)	8:19:17	Tom Lowe (GBR)	8:19:23
2015	Patrik Nilsson (SWE)	8:08:05	Dougal Allan (AUS)	8:25:33	Karl-Johan Danielsson (SWE)	8:38:07
2016	Marcus Larsson (SWE)	8:43:10	Mikkel Mortensen (DEN)	8:51:48	Morgan Patsi (SWE)	8:52:14
2017	Clemente Alonso-McKernan (ESP)	8:07:48	Cameron Wurf (AUS)	8:08:58	Esben Hovgaard (DEN)	8:25:18
2018	Martin Olsson (SWE)	8:44:29	Magnus Olander (SWE)	8:45:06	Erik Hjertonsson (SWE)	8:46:46
2019	Boris Stein (GER)	7:49:14	Denis Chevrot (FRA)	7:51:00	Mathias Lyngsø Petersen (DEN)	7:52:29
2022	Alistair Brownlee (GBR)	7:38:48	Pieter Heemeryck (BEL)	7:46:39	Franz Löschke (GER)	7:49:18
2023	Erik Olsson (SWE)	8:38:22	Marcus Haeggström (SWE)	8:41:43	Sven Bams (HOL)	8:44:11
2024	Matheus Salto Martini (BR)	8:27:12	Filip Jonsson (SWE)	8:33:19	Jaap Koetsier (HOL)	8:39:00
2025	Andreas Bonnichsen (DEN)	8:19:40	Pontus Petrelius Risberg (SWE)	8:26:39	Oliver Wykman (SWE)	8:27:36
2026	Jonas Schomburg (GER)	7:22:57	Matthew Marquardt (US)	7:28:28	Andrea Salvisberg (SUI)	7:28:54

Based on official data

=== Women ===
Year	Gold	Time	Silver	Time	Bronze	Time
2012	Åsa Lundström (SWE)	9:13:27	Dana Wagner (GER)	9:22:32	Emi Sakai (JAP)	9:34:36
2013	Jodie Swallow (GBR)	8:54:01	Eva Nyström (SWE)	9:17:56	Britta Martin (AUS)	9:22:18
2014	Leanda Cave (GBR)	8:56:50	Erika Csomor (HUN)	9:30:04	Camilla Lindholm Borg (SWE)	9:31:38
2015	Astrid Stienen (GER)	9:12:27	Camilla Lindholm Borg (SWE)	9:18:05	Mette Moe (NOR)	9:28:16
2016	Kristin Möller (GER)	9:14:39	Lucie Zelenkova (CZ)	9:21:31	Carolin Lehrieder (GER)	9:24:30
2017	Jolien Lewyllie (BEL)	09:52:34	Jenny Nae (SWE)	10:04:39	Lore Vanclooster (BEL)	10:08:19
2018	Corinne Abraham (GBR)	8:45:06	Åsa Lundström (SWE)	8:54:35	Angela Naeth (CAN)	9:01:03
2019	Jessica Fridlund (SWE)		Lucie Snebergerova (CZ)		Ida Larsson (SWE)	
2022	Sarah Aly (SWE)	9:29:28	Olga Kowalska (POL)	9:31:23	Julia Montgomery (SWE)	9:34:15
2023	Lisa Nordén (SWE)	8:47:03	Justine Mathieux (FRA)	8:54:21	Susie Cheetham (GBR)	8:56:17
2024	Marlene De Boer (HOL)	8:39:31	Katrine Græsbøll Christensen (DEN)	8:41:27	Henrike Güber (GER)	8:42:39
2025	Katrine Græsbøll Christensen (DEN)	8:27:49	Marlene De Boer (HOL)	8:33:02	Chelsea Sodaro (US)	8:45:42
2026	Laura Philipp (GER)	8:13:37	Katrine Græsbøll Christensen (DEN)	8:32:22	Jackie Hering (US)	8:34:56

Based on official data
