= Scott Tinley =

American triathlete (born 1956)

Medal record

Men's triathlon

Representing United States

Ironman World Championship
Gold medal – first place	1982 (Feb)	Men's race
Gold medal – first place	1985	Men's race
Silver medal – second place	1982 (Oct)	Men's race
Silver medal – second place	1983	Men's race
Silver medal – second place	1984	Men's race
Silver medal – second place	1990	Men's race
Bronze medal – third place	1981	Men's race
Bronze medal – third place	1986	Men's race

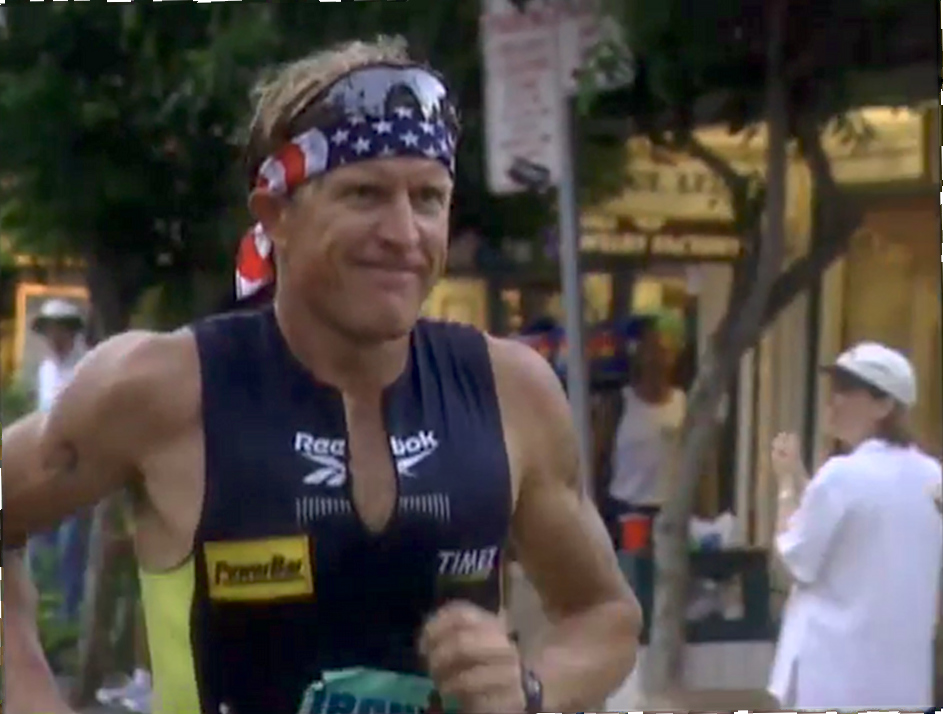

Scott Tinley (born October 25, 1956) is a former professional triathlete and two-time winner of the Ironman World Championships in Hawaii. In the 1980s Tinley dominated the sport of triathlon together with Mark Allen, Dave Scott and Scott Molina. Tinley was inducted into the Ironman Hall of Fame in 1996.

Now retired, Tinley is a writer, teacher, and ocean lifeguard. His latest book, In the Wake of Our Past, is a character-driven, work of historical fiction that focuses on a returning Vietnam War vet. His previous book, Racing the Sunset, a journey through athlete retirement and the larger issues of life transition and change, is the result of a research project he embarked on.

Tinley taught English and "Sport and Society" at San Diego State University, and currently teaches "Sports, Games, and Culture" at San Diego State University and California State University San Marcos. This 7th generation Southern Californian currently (2020) resides in Del Mar, California with his wife and has two grown children.
