= Luke Bell (triathlete) =

Australian triathlete (born 1979)

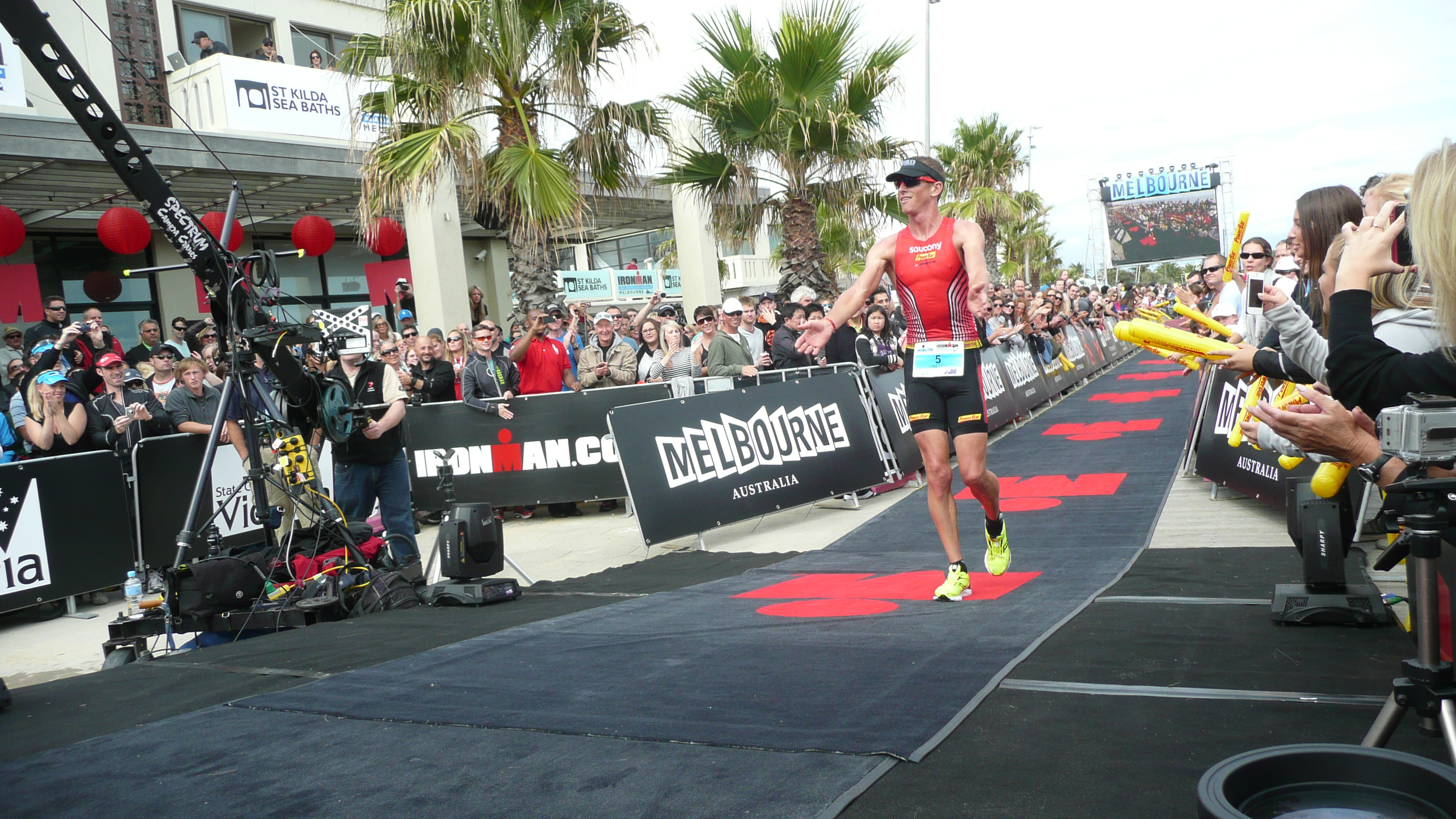

Personal information
- Nicknames: Belly, Bellie
- Born: 21 April 1979 (age 47)
- Height: 1.85 m (6 ft 1 in)
- Weight: 74 kg (163 lb)

Sport
- Country: Australia
- Turned pro: 2003
- Coached by: Matt Dixon

Achievements and titles
- Personal best(s): 5th Place, Ironman World Championships

Luke Bell is an Australian triathlete, specializing in long course triathlons, particularly half-ironman and Ironman distance. Bell was born in Portland, Australia, but currently resides in Melbourne. Bell spends time training in Boulder, Colorado during the Australian winter.

== Professional triathlete ==
His best results in full-distance Ironman Triathlons include 5th place in Hawaii in 2003 at the relatively young age of 24. He also has second-place finishes at Ironman Australia, Ironman Brazil and Ironman New Zealand. He has won multiple half-ironman races, including California, Shepparton, and Tasmania. His former coach is Paul Huddle, husband of Ironman legend Paula Newby-Fraser, and current coach is Matt Dixon from Purple Patch Fitness.

== Additional information ==
Bell was featured in the Ironman documentary entitled What it Takes, which tracked four triathletes competing for the Ironman World Championships in Kona, Hawaii. The film also featured fellow triathletes Peter Reid, Heather Fuhr, and Lori Bowden.
