= Ironman Lake Placid =

Triathlon race in New York, US

Ironman Lake Placid (sometimes referred to as Ironman USA) is a triathlon race owned by the World Triathlon Corporation (WTC) that takes place in Lake Placid, New York, and the surrounding Adirondack Mountains. It is the longest-running Ironman triathlon in North America apart from the Ironman World Championship. Lake Placid played host to the Winter Olympics in 1932 and again in 1980, and has hosted Ironman Lake Placid every summer since 1999.

In August 2014, the CEO of WTC, Andrew Messick, announced that Ironman Lake Placid would be among the list of North American races that would no longer offer a pro purse prize in 2015. This decision came as a result of the growing Ironman brand, the increased fragmentation of the overall purse prize, and the date of the race in relation to the Ironman World Championship.

== Results ==
Year	Men	Time	Women	Time
2025	Matthew Marquardt (USA)	7:50:08	Solveig Løvseth (NOR)	8:43:29
2024	Trevor Foley (USA)	7:55:23	Danielle Lewis (USA)	9:01:54
2023	Joe Skipper (GBR)	8:03:46	Alice Alberts (USA)	9:16:01
2022	Cody Beals (CAN)	8:15:11	Sarah True (USA)	9:00:22
2021	Rasmus Svenningson (SWE)	8:13:25	Lisa Nordén (SWE)	9:11:26
2019	Matt Russell (USA)	8:27:57	Kirsten Schut (ZAF)	10:01:14
2018	Edward Baker (USA)	9:18:28	Heather Jackson (USA)	9:18:49
2017	Brent McMahon (CAN)	8:13:53	Amy Farrell (USA)	9:46:00
2016	Ryan Giuliano (USA)	9:07:15	Heather Jackson (USA)	9:09:42
2015	Corey Deveaux (CAN)	9:31:09	Amy Farrell (USA)	10:13:31
2014	Kyle Buckingham (USA)	8:38:43	Leslie Dimichele (USA)	9:29:43
2013	Andy Potts (USA)	8:43:29	Jennie Hansen (USA)	9:35:06
2012	Andy Potts (USA)	8:25:07	Jessie Donavan (USA)	9:47:93
2011	T.J. Tollakson (USA)	8:25:15	Heather Wurtele (CAN)	9:19:03
2010	Ben Hoffman (USA)	8:39:34	Amy Marsh (USA)	9:27:30
2009	Maik Twelsiek (GER)	8:36:37	Tereza Macel (CZE)	9:29:36
2008	Francisco Pontano (ESP)	8:43:32	Caitlin Snow (USA)	9:51:00
2007	Alex Mroszczyk-McDonald (USA)	9:16:02	Belinda Granger (AUS)	9:40:20
2006	Victor Zyemtsev (USA)	8:38:18	Molly Zahr (USA)	10:11:35
2005	Tony Delogne (USA)	8:56:11	Heather Fuhr (CAN)	9:45:06
2004	Simon Lessing (GBR)	8:23:12	Kate Major (USA)	9:24:42
2003	Kirill LitovTsenko (EST)	8:46:15	Heather Fuhr (CAN)	9:51:55
2002	Ryan B. Bolton (USA)	8:39:19	Heather Fuhr (CAN)	9:43:12
2001	Steve Larsen (USA)	8:33:13	Heather Fuhr (CAN)	9:31:12
2000	Cameron Widoff (USA)	8:46:05	Melissa Spooner (CAN)	9:45:57
1999	Thomas Hellriegel (GER)	8:36:59	Heather Fuhr (CAN)	9:51:38
