= Lisa Bentley =

Canadian triathlete (born 1968)

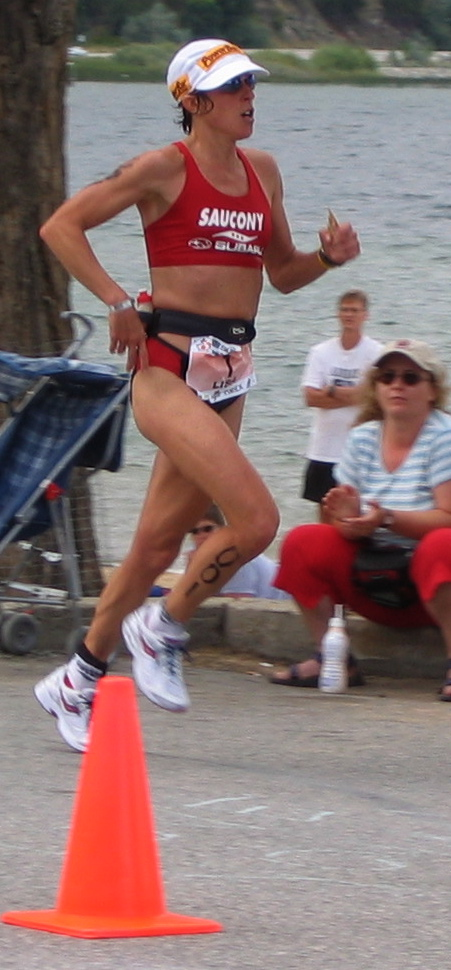
- Ironman Canada 2004

Personal information
- Born: 28 November 1968 (age 57)
- Height: 5 ft 4 in (1.63 m)
- Weight: 115 lb (52 kg)

Sport
- Country: Canada
Medal record
Representing Canada
Women's triathlon
Ironman World Championship
Bronze medal – third place	2006	Individual
Ironman World Championship 70.3
Silver medal – second place	2006	Individual

Lisa Bentley (born November 28, 1968) is a Canadian triathlete. She has been competing on the Ironman race series since late in the 1990s. In 1988, Bentley was diagnosed with cystic fibrosis. She has won 11 Ironman competitions. In 2006, Bentley placed third at the Ironman World Championship, her best showing and finished second at the Ironman 70.3 World Championships in Clearwater, Florida three weeks later.

== Ironman series victories ==
- 2000 IM New Zealand
- 2001 IM New Zealand
- 2002 IM Australia
- 2003 IM Australia
- 2003 IM Canada
- 2004 IM Australia
- 2004 IM Canada
- 2005 IM Australia
- 2005 IM Germany
- 2006 IM Australia
- 2007 IM Canada

== Ironman World Championships ==
- 1997 - 9th won by: Heather Fuhr
- 2000 - 6th won by: Natascha Badmann
- 2002 - 6th won by: Natascha Badmann
- 2003 - 5th won by: Lori Bowden
- 2004 - 4th won by: Natascha Badmann
- 2005 - DNF (medical) won by: Natascha Badmann
- 2006 - 3rd won by: Michellie Jones

== Honours ==
Bentley was inducted into the Caledon Sports Hall of Fame in January 2025.
