= What It Takes (film) =

- Directed by: Peter Han
- Produced by: Erik Blachford; Jason Costa; Rob Cromwell; Brian Hayes; Ben Heller; Jim Kalustian
- Starring: Luke Bell; Lori Bowden; Heather Fuhr; Peter Reid
- Cinematography: Andrew Ernst
- Edited by: Andrew Ernst; Michelle Odo
- Distributed by: WIT Group, LLC
- Release date: 2006 (U.S.)
- Running time: 96 minutes
- Language: English

What It Takes is a documentary film directed by Peter Han that follows four elite Ironman triathletes through a year of training and preparation in advance of the 2005 Ironman World Championship in Kona, Hawaii.

The film was shot digitally in native 16:9 widescreen using Panasonic AJ-SDX900 camcorders in 24 frames per second. Filming began in November 2004 and completed in February 2006.
