= 2005 Ironman World Championship =

The 2005 Ironman World Championship was a long distance triathlon competition held on October 15, 2005 in Kailua-Kona, Hawaii that was won by Faris Al-Sultan and Natascha Badmann. It was the 29th edition of the Ironman World Championship, which has been held annually in Hawaii since 1978. The championship was organized by the World Triathlon Corporation (WTC).

== Championship results ==
=== Men ===
Pos.	Time (h:mm:ss)	Name	Country	Split times (h:mm:ss / m:ss)				
Pos.	Time (h:mm:ss)	Name	Country	Swim	T1	Bike	T2	Run
Gold medal	8:14:17	Faris Al-Sultan	Germany	49:54	1:52	4:25:24	2:16	2:54:51
Silver medal	8:19:36	Cameron Brown	New Zealand	52:23	1:54	4:33:08	1:58	2:50:13
Bronze medal	8:20:04	Peter Reid	Canada	52:23	1:43	4:27:51	2:08	2:55:59
4	8:22:30	Rutger Beke	Belgium	55:01	1:55	4:30:30	2:23	2:52:41
5	8:23:01	Cameron Widoff	United States	52:16	1:56	4:28:44	2:18	2:57:47
6	8:23:52	Chris McCormack	Australia	53:06	1:57	4:37:06	2:33	2:49:10
7	8:25:52	Raynard Tissink	South Africa	54:48	1:55	4:31:37	2:21	2:55:11
8	8:25:57	Tom Söderdahl	Finland	52:19	1:59	4:35:23	1:59	2:54:17
9	8:27:24	Francisco Pontano	Spain	49:56	1:47	4:35:45	1:49	2:58:07
10	8:29:35	Stephan Vuckovic	Germany	52:11	1:43	4:36:56	2:06	2:56:39

=== Women ===
Pos.	Time (h:mm:ss)	Name	Country	Split times (h:mm:ss / m:ss)				
Pos.	Time (h:mm:ss)	Name	Country	Swim	T1	Bike	T2	Run
Gold medal	9:09:30	Natascha Badmann	Switzerland	1:02:30	2:13	4:52:00	6:22	3:06:25
Silver medal	9:11:51	Michellie Jones	Australia	54:55	1:52	4:54:13	2:38	3:18:13
Bronze medal	9:12:39	Kate Major	Australia	1:00:07	2:22	5:06:13	1:38	3:02:19
4	9:14:53	Joanna Lawn	New Zealand	55:09	2:25	5:05:06	2:11	3:10:02
5	9:22:08	Kate Allen	Austria	1:00:15	2:10	5:11:57	2:46	3:05:00
6	9:27:54	Katja Schumacher	Germany	58:49	2:20	5:12:18	2:31	3:11:56
7	9:28:16	Belinda Granger	Australia	1:00:05	2:26	5:02:01	2:19	3:21:25
8	9:30:18	Kim Loeffler	United States	1:02:28	2:27	5:10:48	2:29	3:12:06
9	9:30:47	Karen Smyers	United States	1:00:12	2:23	5:02:24	3:21	3:22:27
10	9:32:20	Melissa Ashton	Australia	55:35	2:11	5:14:49	2:23	3:17:22
