= Faris Al-Sultan =

German triathlete (born 1978)

Faris al-Sultan
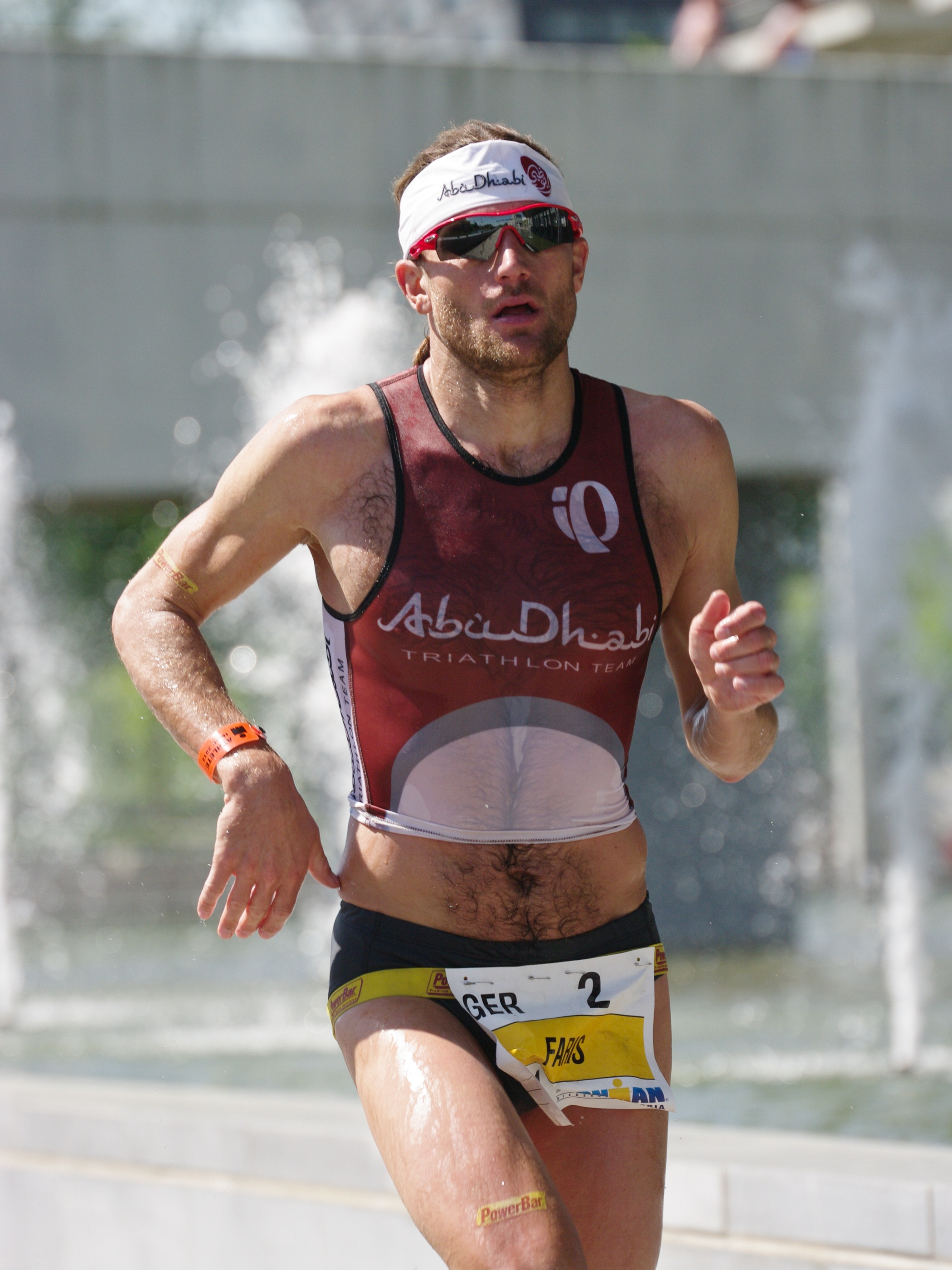

Personal information
- Nickname: The Sultan of Sweat
- Born: 21 January 1978 (age 48) Munich, Germany

Sport
- Country: Germany

Achievements and titles
- Personal best: 8:14:00 (2005)
Medal record
Representing Germany
Men's triathlon
Ironman World Championship
Gold medal – first place	2005	Individual
Bronze medal – third place	2004	Individual
Bronze medal – third place	2006	Individual

Faris al-Sultan (Arabic: فارس السلطان, born 21 January 1978) is a German former triathlete who is now active as a coach. In 2005, he was the third German to win the Ironman Hawaii. He is listed in the best list of German triathletes on the Ironman distance.

== Career ==
Faris al-Sultan is known for his strengths in all three triathlon disciplines. In the running segment, he has a consistent but uncommon form of a long stride and loose arms, described as "looping." In competition, he typically wears a Speedo and half-singlet. His interest in triathlon was inspired by Thomas Hellriegel, a German triathlete.

Faris was born 21 January 1978 in Munich, Germany to a German mother and an Iraqi father. He started out as a collegiate swimmer before taking on triathlon. His first Ironman in 1997 was Lanzarote Ironman, which he completed in a time of 10:33. Al-Sultan achieved his first Ironman win at the inaugural running of Ironman Arizona in 2005. He competed at the Ironman world championships in Hawaii in 1999, 2001, 2003 and 2004 before finally winning there in 2005. The favorite that year, fellow German Normann Stadler, withdrew due to flat tyres. In al-Sultan's return to defend the title in 2006, he placed third. At the 2007 championships, Faris did not compete due to a case of gastroenteritis the morning of the race. He said choosing not to compete "was one of the hardest decisions of my life." He was the winner at the 2013 Ironman Lanzarote on 18 May, completing with an overall time of 8:42:40.

== Private life ==
Al-Sultan's father Talib came to Germany from Iraq in 1958. His mother Lydia is from Munich, where his father works as the head of a translation agency. Faris Al-Sultan attended high school in Munich/Moosach. He was a graduate student at LMU Munich, working on a Master's degree in Arabic language, literature, and history. Al-Sultan dropped out of graduate school before completing his degree to focus on triathlons.

In April 2014, his son was born; since November 2014 he has been married to former triathlete Ina Reinders and in January 2016, their daughter was born.

Faris al-Sultan is the coach of Patrick Lange, 3-time Ironman World Champion triathlete.
