= Kaustubh Radkar =

Indian triathlete (born 1982)

Kaustubh Radkar (born 5 May 1982) is an Indian triathlete. He has finished the Ironman Triathlon 40 times, making him the first and only Indian to do so. He was the only Indian to finish Ironman World Championship at Kona in 2017. A former Indian national swimming champion for 1995-2000, Kaustubh was also the fastest Indian at the Comrades Ultra marathon in 2016; and holds the record for the fastest debut for an Indian at Ultraman Florida. The Ultraman triathlon is a 3 day event which consists of 10 km swimming, 423 km cycling and 84.4 km running (total 517.5 km) spread over 3 days with a cut off of 12 hours each day.

Kaustubh Radkar has also been selected as one of the Fit India Ambassador, which is part of the Fit India Movement, launched by Prime Minister Narendra Modi in 2019. The intention of the movement is to take the nation on a path of fitness and wellness, and make India a fit society.
