= What It Takes =

What It Takes may refer to:

- What It Takes (film), a documentary about Ironman triathletes
- "What It Takes" (Aerosmith song), 1989
- "What It Takes" (Adam Gregory song), 2008
- What It Takes (EP), a 1997 EP by Choclair
- What It Takes, a 2009 album by The Sleeping
- What It Takes: The Way to the White House, a 1992 book by Richard Ben Cramer
- "What It Takes" (Succession), a 2021 episode of TV series Succession
