= Scott Molina =

American triathlete

Medal record

Representing United States

Men's triathlon

Ironman World Championship
Gold medal – first place	1988	Individual

Scott Molina (born February 29, 1960) is a retired triathlete. His most memorable performances took place at the Ironman World Championships in Kona Hawaii. The peak of his career coincided with the going out of Dave Scott and coming in of Mark Allen, both 6 time Ironman world champions. Molina won Ironman World Championships in 1988. He has garnered the nickname, "The Terminator".

Apart from winning Kona, Molina won over 100 professional races in his career.

Molina married fellow pro triathlete Erin Baker in 1990. He lives in New Zealand where he works as a coach and has run the Epic Camp with Gordo Byrn.
