= Kat Matthews =

English triathlete competing at long distances

Katrina Matthews
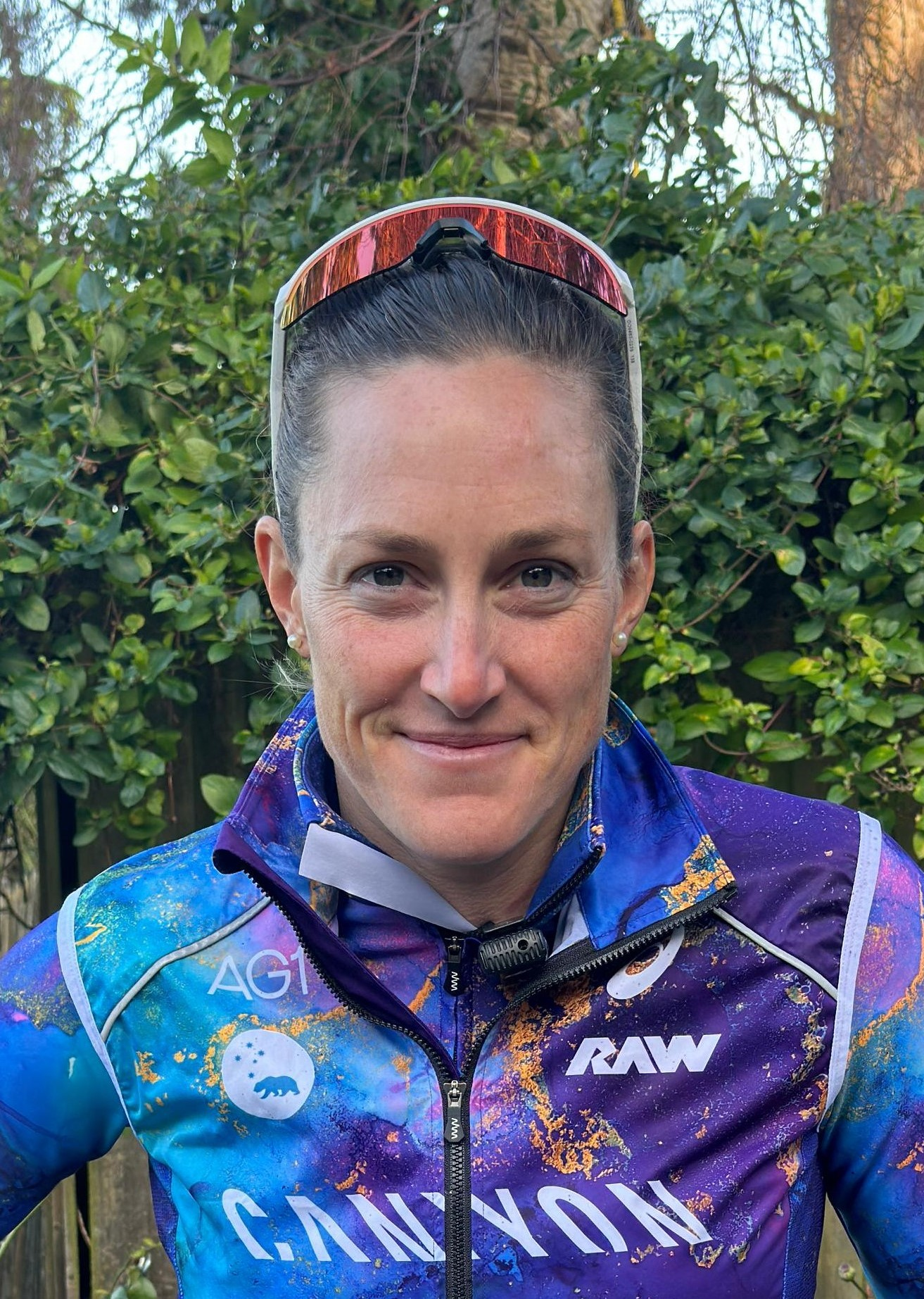

Personal information
- Born: 13 March 1991 (age 35) Exmouth, Devon, England
- Agent: Patrick Lemieux
- Height: 164 cm (5 ft 5 in)
- Weight: 60 kg (132 lb)
- Website: www.katrinamatthewstri.com

Sport
- Country: UK
- Team: CANYON
- Turned pro: 2019

Achievements and titles
- Personal bests: Ironman: 8:05:13 (2025); Ironman 70.3: 3:57:04(2023)
Medal record
Representing Great Britain
Women's triathlon
Ironman World Championship
Silver medal – second place	2022 St George, USA	Individual
Silver medal – second place	2024 Nice, FRA	Individual
Silver medal – second place	2025 Hawaii, USA	Individual
Ironman 70.3
Silver medal – second place	2023 Lahti, FIN	Individual
Silver medal – second place	2024 Taupo, NZ	Individual
Ironman Pro Series
Gold medal – first place	2024	Individual
Gold medal – first place	2025	Individual

Katrina Matthews (born 13 March 1991, née Rye) is an English professional triathlete who races in non-drafting, long-distance events. Major results include second places at the 2021 Ironman World Championship in Utah, USA, the 2024 Ironman World Championship in Nice, France, the 2025 Ironman World Championship in Kona, Hawaii, USA, the 2023 Ironman 70.3 World Championship in Lahti, Finland and the 2024 Ironman 70.3 World Championship in Taupō, New Zealand. Matthews won the inaugural Ironman Pro Series in 2024. In April 2025 Matthews recorded an Ironman Triathlon World best of all time: 8:10:34 winning Ironman Texas. She was a member of the BMC Pro triathlon team and previously worked as a physiotherapist officer in the British Army.

== Triathlon career ==
In 2018, as an amateur, Matthews won Ironman 70.3 Calgary as well as the UK National Championships later on in the year. Early in the 2019 season, Matthews won Challenge Gran Canaria as an amateur thus securing her pro licence and, as a professional went on to podium at four middle distance events including winning the ETU European Championships. In her first Ironman: IM Western Australia she was 4th with a debut time of 8:53:58.

In 2020 Matthews won the first post-pandemic IM 70.3 (Tallinn) and the first post-pandemic Ironman: Ironman Florida with a time of 8:40:50 (at the time the 3rd fastest ever British woman). Notably she also won the UK national 100-mile cycling TT in 3 hours and 55 minutes.

In 2021, Matthews finished fourth at the Ironman 70.3 World Championship in St George. In the inaugural PTO Collins Cup she had the 4th fastest time, winning her match. She also won IM UK in Bolton and came 2nd to Daniela Ryf at IM Tulsa.

In 2022, Matthews won Ironman Lanzarote 70.3 beating the reigning Ironman world champion Anne Haug by over 3 minutes. Racing in her first Ironman World Championships in St George, Utah in May 2022 she was second to Daniela Ryf. She had been invited to participate in the Sub7Sub8 challenge racing against Nicola Spirig. Matthews smashed the 8-hour 'barrier' finishing ahead of Spirig at the Sub7 Sub8 Project with a time of 7:31:57, the fastest ever Ironman distance time. While acclimatizing in Texas for the 2022 Ironman World Championships in Kona, Hawaii, a driver drove into her resulting in very serious injuries. Once sufficiently recovered her structured rehabilitation moved to an active return to training in December. She was ranked ninth in the Professional Triathletes Organisation 2022 ranking list. Matthews was named British Army and UK Armed Forces Sportswoman of the Year 2022.

In 2023, recovered and rehabilitated, Matthews returned to racing 'grateful' to finish third at IM 70.3 Oceanside behind Tamara Jewett and the current world champion Chelsea Sodaro. and followed this 3 weeks later with a win at Ironman Texas in a new best Ironman time for a British woman of 8:32:51. In the 2023 Ironman 70.3 World Championship in Lahti, Finland, Matthews finished second to Taylor Knibb. With a win in the IM 70.3 Bahrain Matthews was ranked sixth in the Professional Triathletes Organisation 2023 world ranking list.

In 2024 with the inaugural Professional Triathletes Organisation T100 Tour and the first Ironman Pro Series she set out to be the only athlete in the world to race both series. Wins at Ironman Texas, Ironman Vitoria-Gasteiz (in a new British fastest ever Ironman time of 8:24:23) and podia at T100 San Francisco, T100 London and Ironman 70.3 Tallinn set up success in both the Ironman Pro Series and the T100 Tour. In the autumn Matthews was second in the 2024 Ironman World Championship in Nice to Laura Philipp, finished the Professional Triathletes Organisation T100 World Tour in fourth place and in the 2024 Ironman 70.3 World Championship in Taupō, New Zealand, Matthews finished second to Taylor Knibb. With that result Matthews won the Ironman Pro Series with an overall score of 20,761 (out of 21,500 max).

In 2025 Matthews opened her season with a third consecutive win at Ironman Texas, notably beating Taylor Knibb the current Ironman 70.3 World Champion. Her time was an Ironman Triathlon World best of all time: 8:10:34, beating the previous mark by 8 minutes. A month later she backed this up placing second to the World Champion Laura Philipp at Ironman Hamburg in an even faster time of 8:05:13. In the 2025 Ironman World Championship in Kona on 11 October she placed second behind Solveig Løvseth and ahead of Laura Philipp, setting a record for the run: 2:47:23. With those results plus two Ironman 70.3 wins in Swansea and Zell am See, Matthews won the Ironman Pro Series again with an overall score of 20,845 (out of 21,500 max).

== Notable results ==
Matthews' notable achievements include:

Date	Event	Rank
7 November 2020	Ironman Florida	1
23 May 2021	Ironman Tulsa	2
4 July 2021	Ironman UK	1
28 August 2021	Collins Cup	4
19 March 2022	Ironman 70.3 Lanzarote	1
6 May 2022	2021 Ironman World Championship	2
22 April 2023	Ironman Texas	1
26 August 2023	Ironman 70.3 World Championship	2
27 April 2024	Ironman Texas	1
8 June 2024	T100 San Francisco	2
14 July 2024	Ironman Vitoria-Gasteiz	1
27 July 2024	T100 London	3
22 September 2024	Ironman World Championships 2024	2
14 December 2024	Ironman 70.3 World Championship	2
26 April 2025	Ironman Texas	1
1 June 2025	Ironman Hamburg	2
12 October 2025	Ironman World Championships 2025	2

== Competitions ==
Tours/Series

Year	Tour/Series	Rank
2024	T100 World Championships Tour	4
2024	Ironman Pro Series	1
2025	Ironman Pro Series	1

== Results ==
Results list

Date	Competition	Rank
09 Jun 2019	Ironman 70.3 Staffordshire	3
29 Jun 2019	Ironman 70.3 Finland	2
05 Jul 2019	ETU European Championships	1
07 Sep 2019	Ironman 70.3 World Championship Nice	16
22 Sep 2019	Ironman 70.3 Weymouth	3
01 Dec 2019	Ironman Western Australia	4
05 Sep 2020	Ironman 70.3 Tallinn	1
27 Sep 2020	Outlaw Half Nottingham	1
07 Nov 2020	Ironman Florida	1
06 Dec 2020	Challenge Daytona	DNF
24 Apr 2021	Challenge Gran Canaria	4
23 May 2021	Ironman Tulsa	2
04 Jul 2021	Ironman UK Bolton	1
28 Aug 2021	Collins Cup Samorin	4
18 Sep 2021	Ironman 70.3 World Championship St George	4
19 Mar 2022	Ironman 70.3 Lanzarote	1
7 May 2022	Ironman World Championships St George	2
07 Aug 2022	Ironman 70.3 Swansea	1
20 Aug 2022	Collins Cup Samorin	11
17 Sep 2022	PTO US Open Dallas	9
01 Apr 2023	Ironman 70.3 Oceanside	3
22 Apr 2023	Ironman Texas	1
7 May 2023	WT Long Distance Championships Ibiza	DNF
05 Aug 2023	PTO US Open Milwaukee	7
26 Aug 2023	Ironman 70.3 World Championship Lahti	2
14 Oct 2023	Ironman World Championships Kona	DNF
08 Dec 2023	Ironman 70.3 Bahrain	1
09 Mar 2024	T100 Miami	DNF
27 Apr 2024	Ironman Texas	1
2 Jul 2024	Ironman Hamburg	DQ
08 Jun 2024	T100 San Francisco	2
14 Jul 2024	Ironman Vitoria-Gasteiz	1
27 Jul 2024	T100 London	3
25 Aug 2024	Ironman 70.3 Tallinn	2
22 Sep 2024	Ironman World Championships Nice	2
28 Sep 2024	T100 Ibiza	13
16 Nov 2024	T100 Final Dubai	5
14 Dec 2024	Ironman 70.3 World Championship Taupo	2
26 Apr 2025	Ironman Texas	1
2 Jun 2025	Ironman Hamburg	2
13 July 2025	Ironman 70.3 Swansea	1
31 Aug 2025	Ironman 70.3 Zell am See/Kaprun	1
12 Oct 2025	Ironman World Championships Kona	2
8 Nov 2025	Ironman 70.3 World Championship Marbella	DNF
7 Mar 2026	Ironman New Zealand	1
22 Mar 2026	Ironman 70.3 Geelong	1

DNF = Did not finish DQ = Disqualified
