= Sodaro =

Sodaro is a surname. Notable people with the surname include:

- Betsy Sodaro (fl. from 2010), American actress
- Chelsea Sodaro (born 1989), American triathlete
