= 2018 Ironman World Championship =

2018 triathlon competition

Ironman World Championship
- Location: Kailua-Kona, Hawaii
- Date: October 13, 2018

Champions
- Men: (Germany) Patrick Lange
- Women: (Switzerland) Daniela Ryf

The 2018 Ironman World Championship was a long distance triathlon competition held on October 13, 2018, in Kailua-Kona, Hawaii that was won by Patrick Lange of Germany and Daniela Ryf of Switzerland. It was the 42nd edition of the Ironman World Championship, which has been held annually in Hawaii since 1978. (Note: with an additional race in 1982) The championship was organized by the World Triathlon Corporation (WTC). For Ryf it was her fourth consecutive Ironman World Championship win. For Lange it was his second consecutive. They set a new overall course record previously set by them in 2016 and 2017 respectively.

== Championship results ==
=== Men ===
Rank	Time (h:mm:ss)	Name	Country	Split times (h:mm:ss / m:ss)				
Rank	Time (h:mm:ss)	Name	Country	Swim	T1	Bike	T2	Run
1st place, gold medalist(s)	7:52:39	Patrick Lange	Germany	50:37	2:05	4:16:05	2:21	2:41:32
2nd place, silver medalist(s)	7:56:41	Bart Aernouts	Belgium	54:07	2:07	4:12:26	2:20	2:45:42
3rd place, bronze medalist(s)	8:01:09	David McNamee	United Kingdom	49:31	2:06	4:21:19	2:13	2:46:03
4	8:03:17	Tim O'Donnell	United States	47:45	2:15	4:18:46	2:00	2:52:34
5	8:04:41	Braden Currie	New Zealand	49:28	2:04	4:17:18	2:15	2:53:39
6	8:04:45	Matt Russell	United States	54:02	1:55	4:12:58	2:54	2:52:57
7	8:05:54	Joe Skipper	United Kingdom	50:53	2:25	4:15:41	2:42	2:54:16
8	8:09:34	Andy Potts	United States	49:33	2:05	4:18:51	2:40	2:56:27
9	8:10:32	Cameron Wurf	Australia	50:51	2:05	4:09:06	2:14	3:06:19
10	8:11:04	Michael Weiss	Austria	54:14	2:50	4:11:28	2:32	3:00:03
Source: IMWC results 2018

=== Women ===
Rank	Time (h:mm:ss)	Name	Country	Split times (h:mm:ss / m:ss)				
Rank	Time (h:mm:ss)	Name	Country	Swim	T1	Bike	T2	Run
1st place, gold medalist(s)	8:26:18	Daniela Ryf	Switzerland	57:26	3:22	4:26:07	2:18	2:57:05
2nd place, silver medalist(s)	8:36:34	Lucy Charles	United Kingdom	48:13	2:10	4:38:11	2:10	3:05:50
3rd place, bronze medalist(s)	8:41:58	Anne Haug	Germany	54:19	2:04	4:47:45	2:29	2:55:22
4	8:43:43	Sarah True	United States	52:04	2:24	4:49:19	2:18	2:57:38
5	8:50:45	Mirinda Carfrae	Australia	58:16	2:00	4:46:05	2:43	3:01:41
6	8:52:30	Sarah Crowley	Australia	54:17	2:13	4:43:09	2:22	3:10:30
7	8:54:28	Kaisa Sali	Finland	58:21	2:32	4:44:32	2:58	3:06:06
8	8:57:36	Angela Naeth	Canada	58:27	2:52	4:42:26	2:39	3:11:13
9	8:57:55	Corinne Abraham	United Kingdom	58:42	2:25	4:38:16	2:05	3:16:27
10	8:58:58	Linsey Corbin	United States	58:22	2:15	4:48:30	2:36	3:07:15
Source: IMWC results 2018

== Sources ==
- "10/13/2018 Results: IRONMAN World Championship". World Triathlon Corporation. October 13, 2018. Archived from the original on October 13, 2016.
