= Robin Beck (triathlete) =

American former triathlete (born 1953)

Medal record

Women's triathlon

Representing United States

Ironman World Championship
Gold medal – first place	1980 Hawaii	Individual

Robin Beck (born 1953) is an American former triathlete who won the 1980 Hawaii Ironman Triathlon.

== Results ==
Date	Position	Event	Swim time	Bike time	Run time	transition time	Total time
1980	1st	Ironman Triathlon, Hawaii	1:20:00	6:05:00	3:56:24		11:21:24
