= Gustav Iden =

Norwegian triathlete (born 1996)

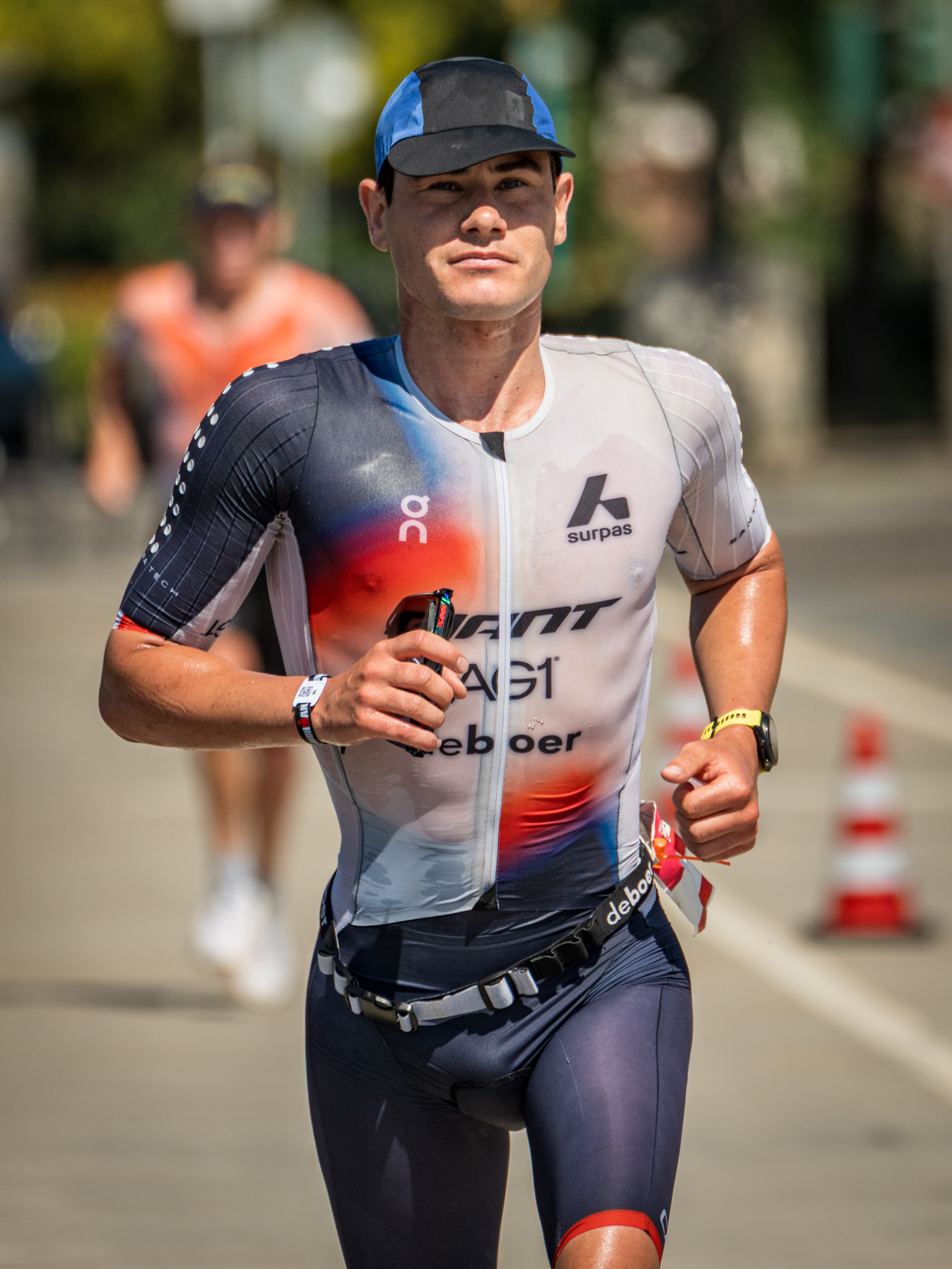
- Iden in 2025

Personal information
- Nationality: Norwegian
- Born: 1 May 1996 (age 30) Bergen, Norway

Sport
- Country: Norway
- Sport: Triathlon
- Club: Åsane Cyckle Klubb
Medal record
Men's triathlon
Representing Norway
World Triathlon Series
Bronze medal – third place	2019 Bermuda	Individual
Bronze medal – third place	2018 Bermuda	Individual
Ironman World Championships
Gold medal – first place	2022 Kona	Elite
Silver medal – second place	2025 Nice	Elite
Silver medal – second place	2026 Kona	Elite
Ironman 70.3 World Championship
Gold medal – first place	2019 Nice	Individual
Gold medal – first place	2021 St. George	Individual

Gustav Iden (born 1 May 1996) is a professional Norwegian triathlete. He is a 2022 Ironman World Champion and he is a two-time winner of the Ironman 70.3 World Championship, winning in 2019 and 2021. At the 2020 Summer Olympics in Tokyo, Japan, Iden placed 8th in the men's triathlon.

He won a silver medal at the 2026 Ironman World Championship in Hawaii. Iden's runner-up finish in Kona earned him enough points to capture the 2026 Ironman Pro Series championship.

In 2018, he was part of a world-first Norwegian 1-2-3 with Casper Stornes and Kristian Blummenfelt finishing ahead of him in first and second place respectively at WTS Bermuda.

Iden's achievements in the Norwegian championships include national titles in both triathlon and duathlon from 2014.

== Personal life ==
Iden was born in Bergen on 1. May 1996.
