= John Dunbar (triathlete) =

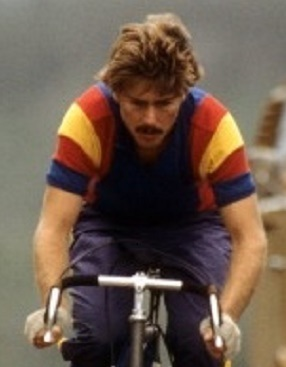
Medal record
Men's triathlon
Representing United States
Ironman World Championship
Silver medal – second place	1979	Elite
Silver medal – second place	1978	Elite

John Dunbar (born 1954) is a retired U.S. Navy SEAL and Ironman triathlete.

Dunbar finished 2nd in the first two Ironman races - 1978 and 1979.

The competitive struggle between Dunbar and the fourteen other athletes in the 1979 race was profiled in a ten-page, 6,175 word article titled "IRONMAN" in the May 14, 1979 issue of Sports Illustrated magazine that is widely credited with launching triathlons into public prominence.
