= Sylviane Puntous =

Canadian triathlete

Medal record

Women's triathlon

Representing Canada

Ironman World Championship
Gold medal – first place	1983	Individual
Gold medal – first place	1984	Individual
Silver medal – second place	1986	Individual
Silver medal – second place	1987	Individual
Silver medal – second place	1989	Individual

Sylviane Puntous is a Canadian former triathlete who won the Hawaii Ironman Triathlon in 1983 and 1984, beating her twin sister Patricia Puntous into second place on both occasions. She was the first non-American winner (male or female) of this championship.

== Results ==
Date	Position	Event	Swim time	Bike time	Run time	transition time	Total time
October 1983	1st	Ironman Triathlon, Hawaii	1:00:28	6:20:40	3:22:28		10:43:36
October 1984	1st	Ironman Triathlon, Hawaii	1:00:45	5:50:36	3:33:51		10:25:13
October 1986	2nd	Ironman Triathlon, Hawaii					9:53:13
October 1987	2nd	Ironman Triathlon, Hawaii					9:36:57
October 1989	2nd	Ironman Triathlon, Hawaii					9:21:55
