= Linda Sweeney =

American former triathlete

Medal record

Women's triathlon

Representing United States

Ironman World Championship
Gold medal – first place	1981	Individual

Linda Sweeney is an American former triathlete who won the 1981 Hawaii Ironman Triathlon.

== Results ==
Date	Position	Event	Swim time	Bike time	Run time	transition time	Total time
1981	1st	Ironman Triathlon, Hawaii	1:02:07	6:53:28	4:04:57		12:00:32
