= Terri Schneider =

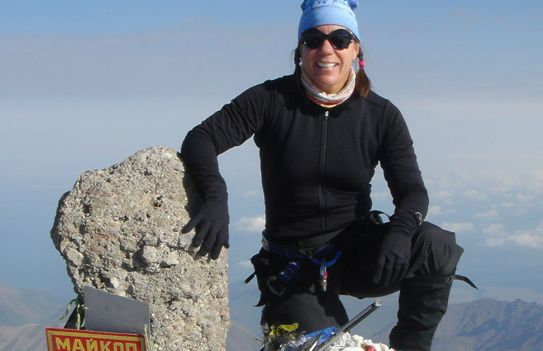
- Born: June 29, 1961 (age 64)
- Occupations: Endurance Athlete, Writer, Speaker, Coach, Consultant
- Website: Official website

Terri Schneider (born June 29, 1961) is an endurance athlete, motivational speaker, author, coach, and consultant. In 1990, she won the Escape from Alcatraz and took third place at the 1990 Ironman World Championship.

== Education ==
Terri earned a MS in Sport Psychology with a research emphasis on team dynamics and a thesis on risk taking from San Jose State University after earning a Bachelor of Science degree in Exercise Physiology at Cal Poly San Luis Obispo.

== Personal Accomplishments ==
- Completed 22 Ironman triathlons, three of them among the top six women at the Kona Ironman World Championships; continues to compete in triathlon, winning her age group in every race she's completed
- Several seven-day running stage races in Costa Rica, Egypt (Sahara Desert), and China (Gobi Desert)
- Completed five 100-mile trail races and many 50 mile and 50K trail races
- Completed seven Eco-Challenge competitions, Mild Seven Outdoor Quest in China, Raid Gauloises in Tibet/Nepal, and many other one-day adventure races
- Mountain summits on six continents
- Additional adventures: Eight-day mountain bike adventure through remote central Mexico; trekking with the Achuar in the Amazon Jungle in Ecuador; ’99 La Ruta de Los Conquistadores (aka “The Toughest Mountain Bike Race on the Planet”) three-day mountain bike race in Costa Rica; Camel Trophy, Georgia – US Trials finalist, only female finalist

== Personal life ==
Terri lives in Santa Cruz, CA.

== Publications ==
- Schneider, Terri (2005), The Triathlete's Guide to Mental Training (Ultrafit Multisport Training), VeloPress, ISBN 978-1931382700
- Schneider, Terri (2008), Triathlon Revolution: Training, Technique, and Inspiration, The Mountaineers Books, ISBN 978-1-59485-096-7
- Schneider, Terri (2016), Dirty Inspirations: Lessons from the Trenches of Extreme Endurance Sports, Hatherleigh Press, ISBN 978-1578266029
