= Fernanda Keller =

Brazilian triathlete

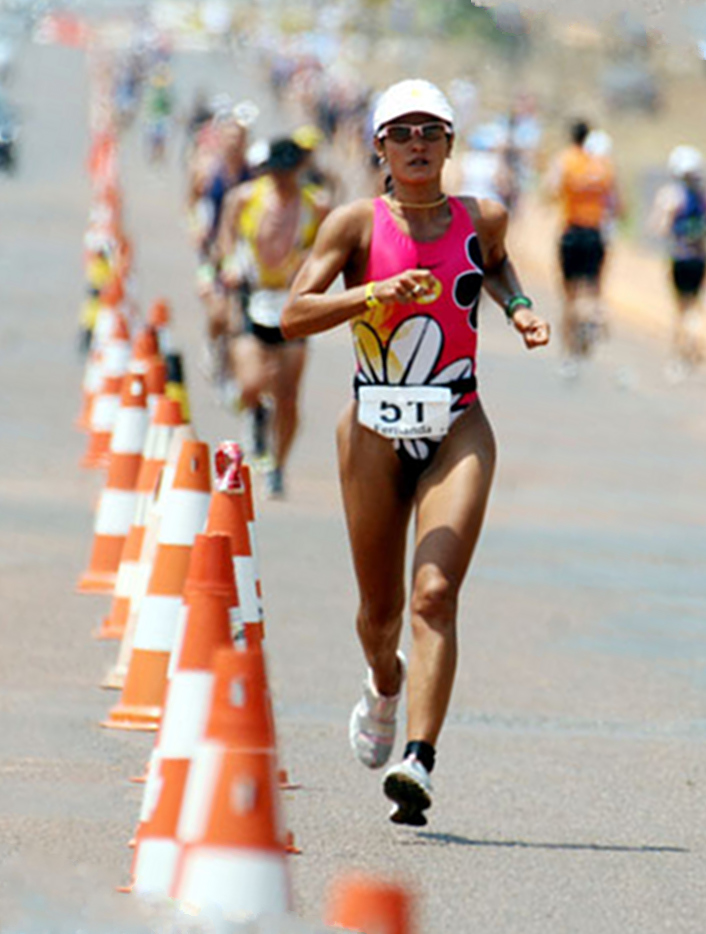

Personal information
- Nickname: Queen of Brazil
- Born: 4 October 1963 (age 62) Niterói, Brazil
- Height: 1.67 m (5 ft 5 1/2 in)
- Weight: 56 kg (123 lb)

Sport
- Country: Brazil
- Turned pro: 1987

Achievements and titles
- Personal best: 9:24:30 (1999)
Medal record
Women's triathlon
Representing Brazil
Ironman World Championship
Bronze medal – third place	1994	Individual
Bronze medal – third place	1995	Individual
Bronze medal – third place	1997	Individual
Bronze medal – third place	1998	Individual
Bronze medal – third place	1999	Individual
Bronze medal – third place	2000	Individual

Fernanda Keller (born 4 October 1963) is a professional triathlete from Brazil who was the first Brazilian woman to medal in the Ironman Triathlon World Championships.

She is the only female athlete in the world to have taken part in 23 consecutive years and to have achieved 14 top-ten finishes in this race. She finished the Ironman Triathlon World Championships in Kailua-Kona, Hawaii in third place in 1994, 1995, 1997, 1998, 1999 and 2000. She won Ironman Brazil three times (2000, 2004 and 2008) and was four times runner-up.

Her first triathlon was 1983 in Rio de Janeiro during her time at the university. Thirty years later, just a few days after her 50th birthday in 2013, she participated in Ironman Hawaii for the 24th time; completing it in 11:03 hours and placing sixth out of 55 women in her age group.

Her Instituto Fernanda Keller, a social institution for 700 adolescents from 7 up to 18 years, has been in business since she founded it in September 1998. In 2012 she launched a collection of fitness and casual apparel.
