= Matthew Marquardt =

American triathlete (born 1997)

Personal information
- Born: October 31, 1997 (age 28) Cincinnati, United States
- Education: Princeton University; Ohio State University College of Medicine

Sport
- Country: United States
- Sport: Triathlon
Medal record
Representing United States
Men's triathlon
Ironman World Championships
Bronze medal – third place	2026 Kona	Elite

Matthew Marquardt (born 31 October 1997) is an American triathlete. He finished third at the Ironman World Championship in 2026.

== Biography ==
From Cincinnati, Marquardt attended Hills High School and was an Ohio state champion swimmer, before qualifying for the US Olympic trials and swimming at Princeton University. When his swim season was cancelled by the Covid-19 pandemic he opted to do a cross-country bike ride from San Diego to Jacksonville in 20 days, averaging over 100 miles daily and raising money for the Make-A-Wish Foundation. Following that, he signed up for his first Ironman Triathlon on a whim, with the intention of maintaining his fitness.

Marquardt continued with his training and combined competing in triathlon with studying medicine at the Ohio State University College of Medicine. He won the 25-29 amateur division at the 2022 Ironman World Championship in Kona, Hawaii. He turned professional shortly afterwards, finishing fourth overall in the 2024 Ironman Pro Series.

In 2025, he secured wins at Ironman Cairns and Ironman Lake Placid, and was the first American to finish at the 2025 Ironman World Championship in Nice, France, finishing in eighth place.

Competing in the 2026 IRONMAN Pro Series, Marquardt had a victory in South Africa, setting a new course record, including running 2:39:07 for the fastest Ironman marathon of his career and an overall time of in 7:42:56. That year, he had also second place finishes at Ironman Lake Placid and Ironman Sweden. In October, Marquardt finished third at the 2026 Ironman World Championship in Kona. Despite serving a 2-minute penalty, he had the second-fastest bike split time.
