= Patrick Lange =

German triathlete

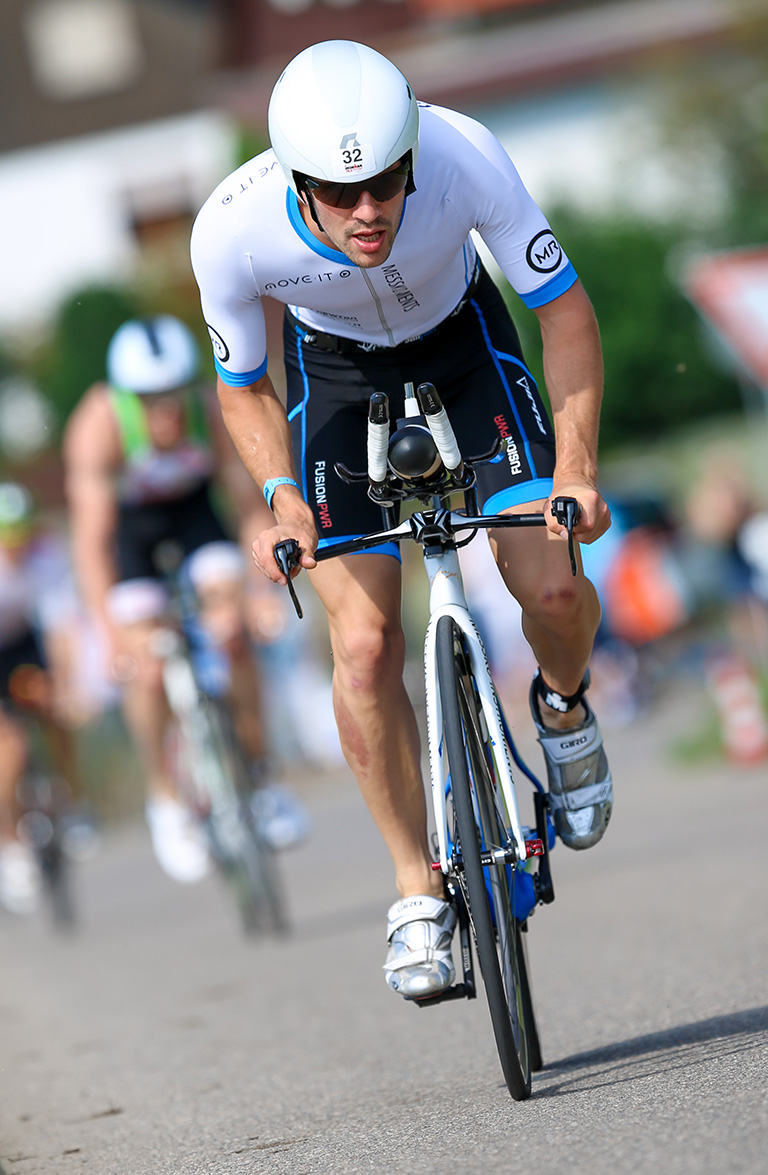
- Patrick Lange Ironman Kraichgau 2015

Personal information
- Born: 25 August 1986 (age 39) Bad Wildungen, Hesse, West Germany

Sport
- Country: Germany
- Sport: Duathlon; Triathlon
- Coached by: Ben Reszel
Medal record
Representing Germany
Men's triathlon
Ironman World Championship
Gold medal – first place	2024	Individual
Gold medal – first place	2018	Individual
Gold medal – first place	2017	Individual
Silver medal – second place	2023	Individual
Bronze medal – third place	2016	Individual

Patrick Lange (German: [ˈpatʁɪk ˈlaŋə]; 25 August 1986) is a professional duathlete and triathlete from Germany. He is a three time Ironman World Champion, setting course records in 2017, 2018 and 2024. Lange is also the 2010–2013 German champion in duathlon and the 2012 and 2013 German champion in team triathlon with EJOT Team TV Buschhütten.

In 2008 Lange won the military world championships team Triathlon in Estonia and made Bronze in the ITU Duathlon Short Distance World Championships mixed team 2012 in Nancy (France).

In 2018 he won the Ironman World Championships in Kona for second consecutive year with a new course record of 7:52:38, the first time the race has been finished in under 8 hours. At the 2016 Ironman World Championships, Lange had a breakthrough performance and placed third behind Jan Frodeno and Sebastian Kienle. Lange completed a 48:57 swim, a 4:37:39 bike and a 2:39:45 run to finish in 8:11:14. In 2017, Lange placed first at the Ironman World Championship. Having completed a 48:45 swim, a 4:28:53 bike and a 2:40:00 run, Lange won the race in a total time of 8:01:40, beating Craig Alexander's 2011 record of 8:03:56. After breaking the course record, during celebrations, Lange duly apologized to Craig Alexander for breaking his previously held record. At the 2023 Ironman World Championships, held in Nice, France, Lange placed 2nd with a time of 8:10:17. Lange set a new Ironman World Championships marathon record with a time of 2:32:41, breaking a record he set himself in 2017.

Lange won the Ironman World Championship for a third time in 2024 with a time of 7:35:53, a new course record, including a 2:37:34 run split.

Lange starts for DSW 1912 Darmstadt. His trainer is Ben Reszel.

Awards
Preceded by Johannes Rydzek	German Sportsman of the Year; 2018	Succeeded by Niklas Kaul
