= Laura Philipp =

German triathlete (born 1987)

Laura Phillipp
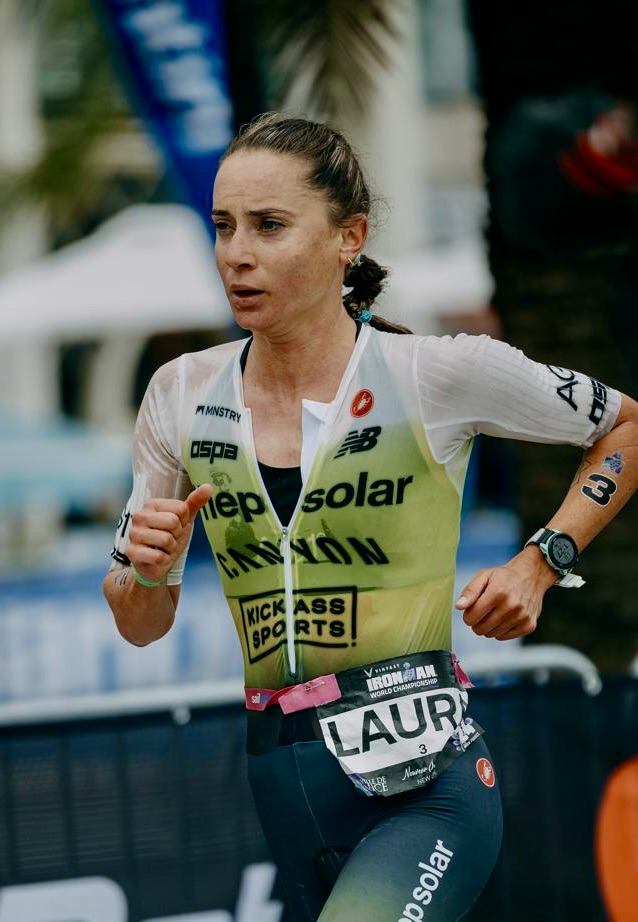

Personal information
- Born: 23 July 1987 (age 39)

Sport
- Country: Germany
- Coached by: Philip Seipp
Medal record
Representing Germany
Women's triathlon
Ironman World Championship
Gold medal – first place	2024 Nice, FRA	Individual
Silver medal – second place	2026 Hawaii, USA	Individual
Bronze medal – third place	2023 Hawaii, USA	Individual
Bronze medal – third place	2025 Hawaii, USA	Individual

Laura Philipp (born 23 April 1987) is a German triathlete. She won the 2024 Ironman World Championship and in 2025 recorded an Ironman Triathlon world all-time best time of 8:03:13.

== Career ==
She took part in rock climbing as a youngster but did not have a background in triathlons and only learned to swim at 24 years-old. She had her first Ironman 70.3 victories in Zell am See and Mallorca in 2016. The following year, she won an Ironman 70.3 World Championship bronze medal.

In 2021, she became the European Ironman Champion in Kuopio-Tahko in Finland.

In March 2022, she won Ironman 70.3 Dubai in a time of 3:53:03, a new Ironman 70.3 world record time. In June 2022, she defended her European Championship title in Hamburg in a time of 08:18:20 with the fastest time a woman has ever completed a full distance Ironman.

In 2023, she finished third at the Ironman World Championships in Hawaii. That year, she finished in third place at the Challenge Roth event in Bavaria as, ahead of her, Daniela Ryf set a world record for the event distance. She later won the Ironman 70.3 European Championship title in Tallinn, Estonia.

In July 2024, she finished runner-up at Challenge Roth, recording the third fastest time ever recorded at the full triathlon distance, finishing behind compatriot Anne Haug as she broke the world record set by Daniela Ryf at the previous years event. She won the 2024 Ironman World Championship in Nice, France in September 2024. At the age of 37 years-old she was the second oldest woman to win the title after the Swiss athlete Natascha Badmann, who claimed the last of her six titles aged 38 in 2005.

She won the 2025 European Championships in Hamburg and in doing so recorded an Ironman Triathlon world all-time best time of 8:03:13, finishing two minutes in front of the previous record holder Kat Matthews of Great Britain. Phillipp placed third behind Solveig Løvseth and Kat Matthews at the 2025 Ironman World Championship in Kona on 11 October 2025. The following year at the 2026 women's Ironman World Championship, Philipp finished second, 3:06 behind Taylor Knibb.

== Personal life ==
She is coached by her husband, Philip Seipp.
