= Global Open Water Swimming Conference =

The Global Open Water Swimming Conference is a conference on the sport of open water swimming, marathon swimming and swimming during triathlons and multi-sport endurance events. The conference is concerned with trends, race tactics, training techniques, equipment, psychological preparation, race organization and safety practices used in the sports of open water swimming, marathon swimming and triathlons.

== Participants ==
Speakers at the conference include English Channel world record holders, coaches, open water swimming champions, professional marathon swimmers, coaches, race directors, officials and administrators from the Africa, Americas, Asia, Europe and Oceania.

Those who give presentations include Greta Andersen, Shelley Taylor-Smith, Dan Empfield, Sid Cassidy and Ram Barkai. Race directors from the Great Swim in Great Britain, Cadiz Freedom Swim in South Africa, Flowers Sea Swim in the Cayman Islands, Waikiki Roughwater Swim in Hawaii, Clean Half Extreme Swim in Hong Kong and Catalina Channel Swimming Federation and swimmers who have successfully swum the English Channel, Catalina Channel, Cook Strait, Tsugaru Strait, Strait of Gibraltar, Molokai Channel and the Manhattan Island Marathon Swim provide unique perspectives on their chosen sport.

== Beginning ==
The conference was first held in Long Beach, California and will be held in New York City and London over the next two years. The Global Open Water Swimming Conference was started due to the desire and need for athletes, coaches, referees, administrators, promoters and sponsors from around the world to share, collect and learn information about the growing sports of open water swimming, marathon swimming and triathlons. The conference offers four central themes: Training, Business, Racing and Lifestyle with each presentation geared towards providing different perspectives on these themes.

After the inclusion of marathon swimming in the 2008 Beijing Olympics and its announced return at the 2012 London Olympics in Hyde Park and at the 2016 Rio Olympics at Copacabana Beach, there was a growing need for sharing information between race directors, athletes, coaches, administrators and referees.

== Awards ==
At the Global Open Water Swimming Conference, awards are presented to the World Open Water Swimming Man of the Year, the World Open Water Swimming Woman of the Year, the World Open Water Swimming Performance of the Year. Special Lifetime Achievement Awards are also presented to individuals who have made significant contributions to the sport over their lifetime.
