= Cameron Brown (triathlete) =

New Zealand triathlete (born 1972)

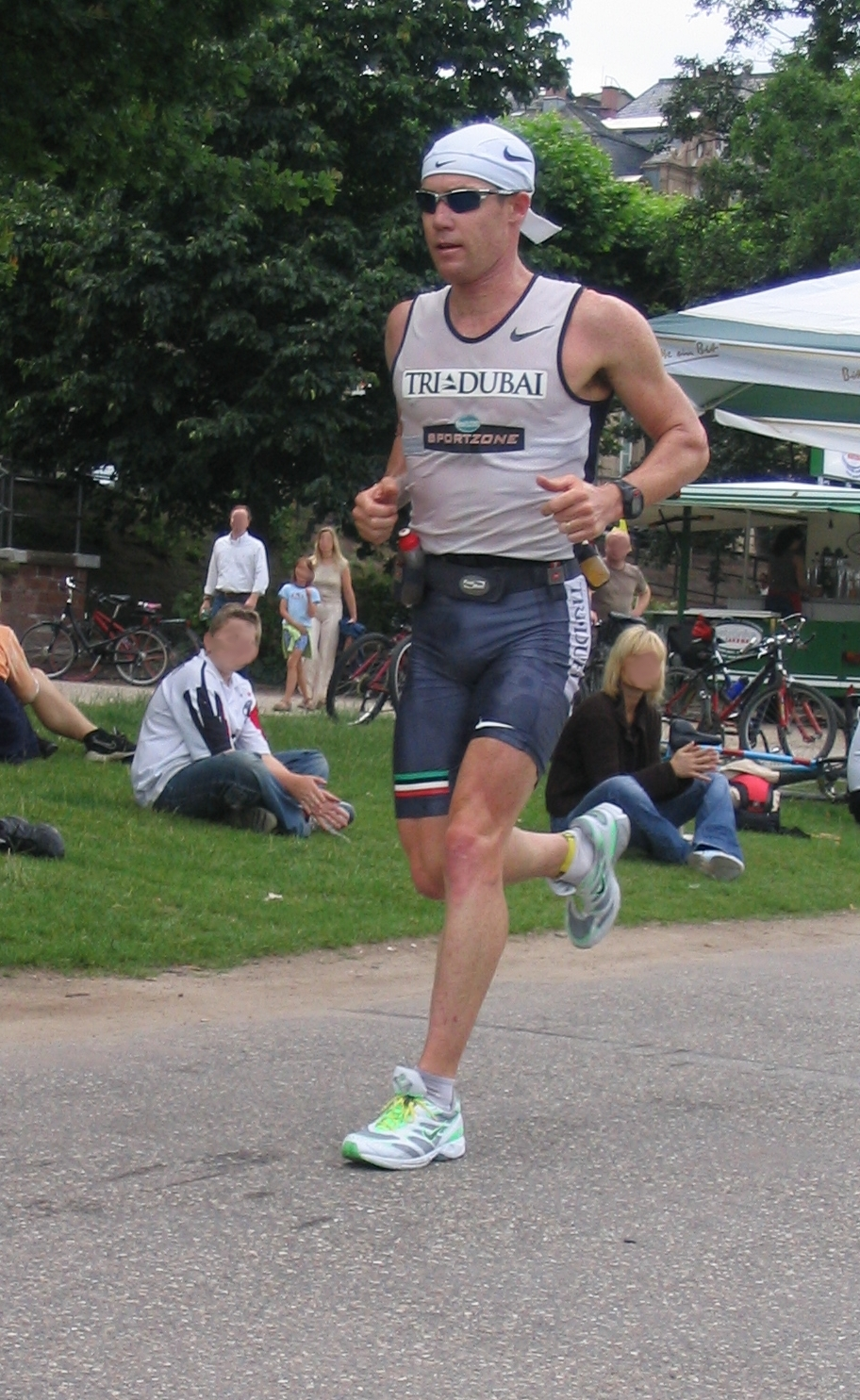

Medal record

Men's triathlon

Representing New Zealand

Ironman World Championship
| Silver medal – second place | 2001 | Individual |
| Silver medal – second place | 2005 | Individual |
| Bronze medal – third place | 2002 | Individual |
| Bronze medal – third place | 2003 | Individual |

Cameron Temple Brown ONZM (born 1972) is an ironman triathlete from New Zealand. He is a twelve-time winner of Ironman New Zealand (2001–2005, 2007–2011, 2015–2016) held in Taupō, New Zealand. His best placing at the Ironman Triathlon World Championships in Kona, Hawaii is 2nd in 2001 and 2005.

== Ironman Triathlon World Championship results ==
| YEAR | RACE | POSITION | SWIM | BIKE | RUN | RESULT |
|---|---|---|---|---|---|---|
| 2011 | Ironman World Championship, Kona, Hawaii, USA | DNF | --- | --- | --- | |
| 2010 | Ironman World Championship, Kona, Hawaii, USA | 17th | --- | --- | --- | 8:34:10 |
| 2009 | Ironman World Championship, Kona, Hawaii, USA | 22nd | --- | --- | --- | 8:53:41 |
| 2008 | Ironman World Championship, Kona, Hawaii, USA | 5th | --- | --- | --- | 8:26:17 |
| 2007 | Ironman World Championship, Kona, Hawaii, USA | DNF | --- | --- | --- | --- |
| 2006 | Ironman World Championship, Kona, Hawaii, USA | 8th | --- | --- | --- | 8:25:22 |
| 2005 | Ironman World Championship, Kona, Hawaii, USA | 2nd | --- | --- | --- | 8:19:36 |
| 2004 | Ironman World Championship, Kona, Hawaii, USA | 34th | --- | --- | --- | 9:32:45 |
| 2003 | Ironman World Championship, Kona, Hawaii, USA | 3rd | --- | --- | --- | 8:30:08 |
| 2002 | Ironman World Championship, Kona, Hawaii, USA | 3rd | --- | --- | --- | 8:35:34 |
| 2001 | Ironman World Championship, Kona, Hawaii, USA | 2nd | --- | --- | --- | 8:46:10 |
| 2000 | Ironman World Championship, Kona, Hawaii, USA | 26th | --- | --- | --- | 8:58:04 |

DNF – Did Not Finish

== Ironman New Zealand results ==
| YEAR | RACE | POSITION | SWIM | BIKE | RUN | RESULT |
|---|---|---|---|---|---|---|
| 2018 | Ironman New Zealand, Taupō, NZL | 3rd | --- | --- | --- | 8:07:10 |
| 2017 | Ironman New Zealand, Taupō, NZL | 2nd | --- | --- | --- | 8:24:32 |
| 2016 | Ironman New Zealand, Taupō, NZL | 1st | --- | --- | --- | 8:07:58 |
| 2015 | Ironman New Zealand, Taupō, NZL | 1st | --- | --- | --- | 8:22:13 |
| 2014 | Ironman New Zealand, Taupō, NZL | 2nd | --- | --- | --- | 8:21:55 |
| 2013 | Ironman New Zealand, Taupō, NZL | 3rd | --- | --- | --- | 8:34:28 |
| 2012* | Ironman New Zealand, Taupō, NZL | 3rd | --- | --- | --- | 3:56:38 |
| 2011 | Ironman New Zealand, Taupō, NZL | 1st | --- | --- | --- | 8:31:07 |
| 2010 | Ironman New Zealand, Taupō, NZL | 1st | --- | --- | --- | 8:21:52 |
| 2009 | Ironman New Zealand, Taupō, NZL | 1st | --- | --- | --- | 8:18:04 |
| 2008 | Ironman New Zealand, Taupō, NZL | 1st | --- | --- | --- | 8:24:49 |
| 2007 | Ironman New Zealand, Taupō, NZL | 1st | --- | --- | --- | 8:26:33 |
| 2006^{†} | Ironman New Zealand, Taupō, NZL | 2nd | --- | --- | --- | 3:31:45* |
| 2005 | Ironman New Zealand, Taupō, NZL | 1st | --- | --- | --- | 8:20:14 |
| 2004 | Ironman New Zealand, Taupō, NZL | 1st | --- | --- | --- | 8:30:30 |
| 2003 | Ironman New Zealand, Taupō, NZL | 1st | --- | --- | --- | 8:22:05 |
| 2002 | Ironman New Zealand, Taupō, NZL | 1st | --- | --- | --- | 8:32:54 |
| 2001 | Ironman New Zealand, Taupō, NZL | 1st | --- | --- | --- | 8:24:28 |
| 2000 | Ironman New Zealand, Taupō, NZL | 2nd | --- | --- | --- | 8:26:45 |

*Event shortened to 70.3 distance due to weather.
^{†}Weather forced organizers to run a shortened event, eventually staging a bike-run over a 90 km loop on the cycle and 21 km lap on the run.

Awards
| Preceded by Rob Waddell | New Zealand's Sportsman of the Year; 2001 | Succeeded by Craig Perks |
