= Dave Scott (triathlete) =

American triathlete

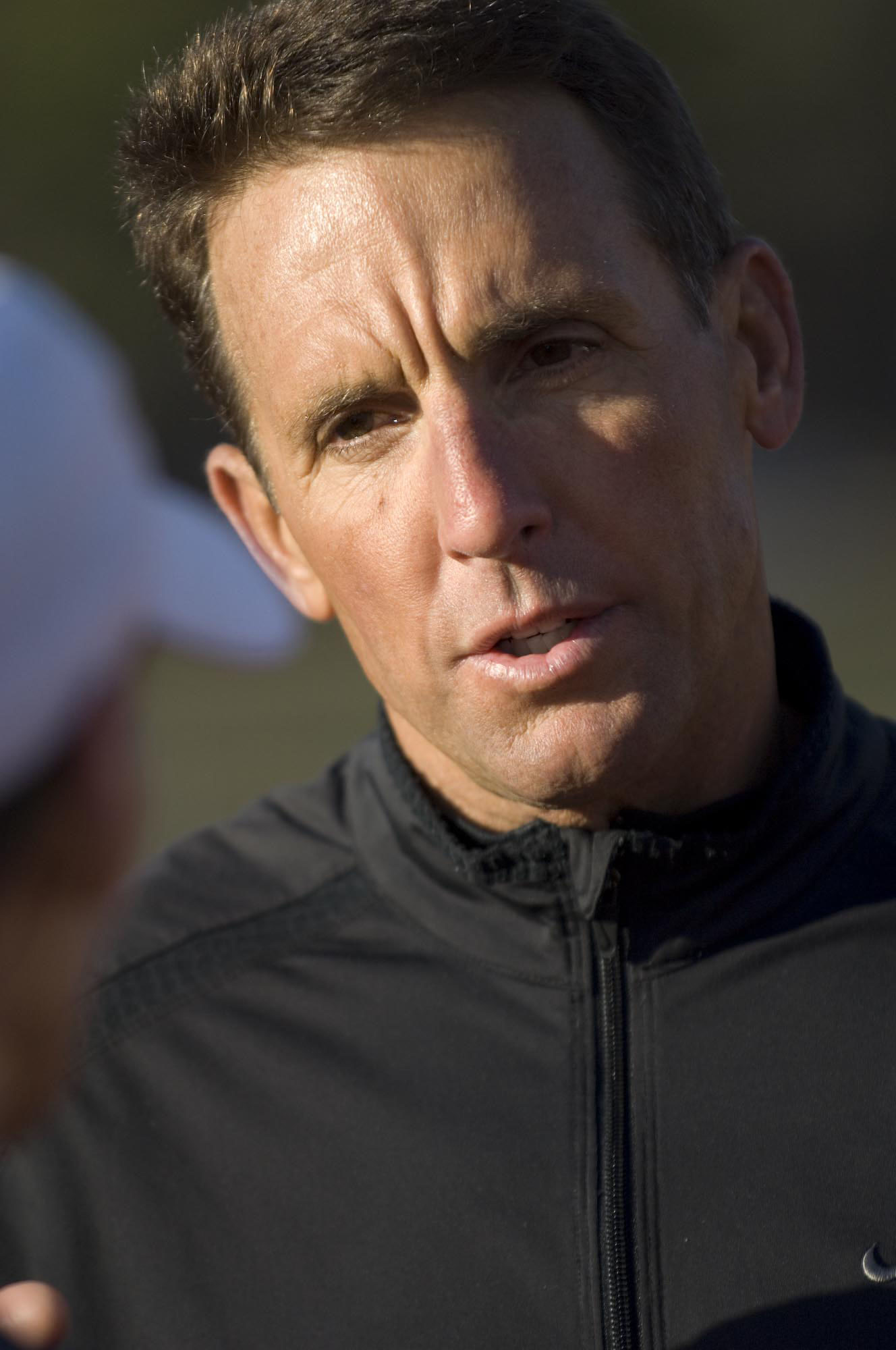
- Dave Scott

Medal record

Men's triathlon

Representing United States

Ironman World Championship
Gold medal – first place	1980	Elite
Gold medal – first place	1982 (Oct)	Elite
Gold medal – first place	1983	Elite
Gold medal – first place	1984	Elite
Gold medal – first place	1986	Elite
Gold medal – first place	1987	Elite
Silver medal – second place	1982 (Feb)	Elite
Silver medal – second place	1989	Elite
Silver medal – second place	1994	Elite

Dave Scott (born January 4, 1954) is a U.S. triathlete and the first six-time Ironman World Championship winner (1980, 1982, 1983, 1984, 1986, and 1987). A progenitor of the sport, in 1993, Scott was the first person inducted in the Ironman Hall of Fame. He is known by the nickname "The Man" for his intense training regimens and his unrelenting race performances that created a record number of wins.

In 1994, at age 40, he won second place at the Hawaii Ironman World Championship, very nearly winning for a record-breaking seventh time. In 1996 at age 42, he returned again to place 5th, running the marathon in 2:45.

== Early life and competition ==
Scott grew up in Davis, California. By middle school, he played basketball and football. He was a water polo player at Davis High School and UC Davis, where he began to focus on swimming. Scott competed and twice won the Waikiki Rough Water Swim, part of the Global Open Water Swimming Conference.

In 1978, US Navy Commander John Collins created the Ironman out of existing races, including the Waikiki Swim. Scott heard about the race from a Sports Illustrated article. Then, “Collins gave me a flier and said, ‘You ought to do this thing.’ I looked at it and saw a 2.4-mile swim, 112-mile bike and 26.2-mile run and turned to him and said, ‘That’s a long three days,’” Scott said. “That moment planted the seed though. To know there were people doing that distance in one day was amazing to me.” Scott had already competed in his first triathlon event in San Francisco: a nine-mile bike, four-mile run and 1,500m swim race. He won the event; his prize was a turkey.

== Triathlon career ==
Scott ran his first Ironman in 1980 and finished in 9:24:33, nearly 2 hours faster than the previous win, with ABC Wide World of Sports broadcasting the event from Kona for the first time. Scott's time and approach is widely considered to have changed the Ironman from a test of endurance to a race. Scott returned in 1982 and finished second. In 1983, Scott won in what was Mark Allen's first Ironman. In what would become a renowned rivalry, Scott would win three of the next four Ironmans over Allen.

Scott has stated that he is most proud of his performance in 1994. Another second-place finish, Scott was 40 years old at the time so his race was considered to be a revolutionary feat. Two years later, Scott finished fifth overall. 2001 was his last foray into the Ironman. The 47-year-old Scott had back problems due to some last minute bike changes, which forced him out of the race.

=== Ironwar ===
In 1989, the rivalry between Scott and Allen reached a peak in what has alternately been called the "Ironwar" and "The Greatest Race Ever Run." Scott has stated "I never focused my goals on Mark Allen or what I had to do in the swim or the bike compared to Mark Allen. Ultimately, the competition level sometimes dictated that. After many years of racing, in 1989, we had a very very close race. It seemed like we were bouncing off of one another. It was influenced by our competitive natures." Allen ultimately won with Scott placing second and both broke Scott's course record.

== Ironman results ==
YEAR	RACE	POSITION	SWIM	BIKE	RUN	RESULT
2001	Ironman World Championship, Kona, Hawaii, USA	DNF	---	---	---	DNF
1996	Ironman World Championship, Kona, Hawaii, USA	5th	---	---	---	8:28:31
1994	Ironman World Championship, Kona, Hawaii, USA	2nd	---	---	---	8:24:32
1989	Ironman World Championship, Kona, Hawaii, USA	2nd	---	---	---	8:10:13
1988	Ironman World Championship, Kona, Hawaii, USA	DNC	---	---	---	---
1987	Ironman World Championship, Kona, Hawaii, USA	1st	---	---	---	8:34:13
1986	Ironman World Championship, Kona, Hawaii, USA	1st	---	---	---	8:28:37
1985	Ironman World Championship, Kona, Hawaii, USA	DNC	---	---	---	---
1984	Ironman World Championship, Kona, Hawaii, USA	1st	---	---	---	8:54:20
1983	Ironman World Championship, Kona, Hawaii, USA	1st	---	---	---	9:05:57
1982	Ironman World Championship, Kona, Hawaii, USA	1st	---	---	---	9:08:23
1982	Ironman World Championship, Kona, Hawaii, USA	2nd	---	---	---	9:14:41
1981	Ironman World Championship, Kona, Hawaii, USA	DNC	---	---	---	---
1980	Ironman World Championship, Oahu, Hawaii, USA	1st	---	---	---	9:24:33

DNC - Did not compete
DNF - Did Not Finish
(In 1982, The Ironman World Championship was moved from a February to October fixture, and therefore took place twice that year. Scott was second in the February race and won in October.)

== Personal life after competition ==
Scott was married to a swimmer and had three children. Now divorced, he lives in Boulder, Colorado.

Scott works as a triathlon coach, fitness consultant, motivational speaker, commentator, and corporate consultant. In 1986, he published his book Dave Scott's triathlon training. Since 1999, Scott has been the head coach for Team in Training, helping to certify TNTcoaches nationwide.

Scott experimented with vegetarian and vegan diets in the past. Since 1994, he has eaten chicken and fish and has criticized vegan diets for lacking Omega 3s.
