= Paula Newby-Fraser =

Zimbabwean triathlete and duathlete

Personal information
- Born: 2 June 1962 (age 64) Harare, Southern Rhodesia
Medal record
Representing Zimbabwe
Women's triathlon
Ironman World Championship
Gold medal – first place	1986	Individual
Gold medal – first place	1988	Individual
Gold medal – first place	1989	Individual
Gold medal – first place	1991	Individual
Gold medal – first place	1992	Individual
Gold medal – first place	1993	Individual
Gold medal – first place	1994	Individual
Gold medal – first place	1996	Individual
Silver medal – second place	1990	Individual
Bronze medal – third place	1985	Individual
Bronze medal – third place	1987	Individual

Paula Newby-Fraser (born 2 June 1962 in Harare) is an Ironman triathlete and duathlete.

== Biography ==
Newby-Fraser was born in Southern Rhodesia (now Zimbabwe) and raised in South Africa, where she was a nationally ranked swimmer as a child. She won the Ironman World Championship in Hawaii 8 times: 1986, 1988–1989, 1991–1994, and 1996. Because of her unprecedented winning streak, she is also referred to as "The Queen of Kona".

Over 12 years, she won 21 of 26 Ironman races she entered around the globe, and dozens of shorter races as well.

Newby-Fraser won 24 Ironman races overall between 1986 and 2002. In the 1990s, she also competed in long distance duathlons like the PowerMan Zofingen in Switzerland and the 1990 World Duathon Championships in Palm Springs, USA. She defeated Liz Downing.

Among numerous other awards, the United States Sports Academy named her as one of the top five professional women athletes of the last 25 years (1972–1997). Paula Newby-Fraser held the Ironman Women's world record of 8:50:28, until 2008-07-13, when Yvonne van Vlerken of the Netherlands posted a time of 8:45:48. Newby-Fraser is regarded as an icon for the Ironman distance in triathlon.

In 1991, Newby-Fraser appeared with the cycling master John Howard, in John Howard's Lessons In Cycling video produced by New & Unique Videos of San Diego, California. Newby-Fraser demonstrated the cycling technique called "The Hot Stop".

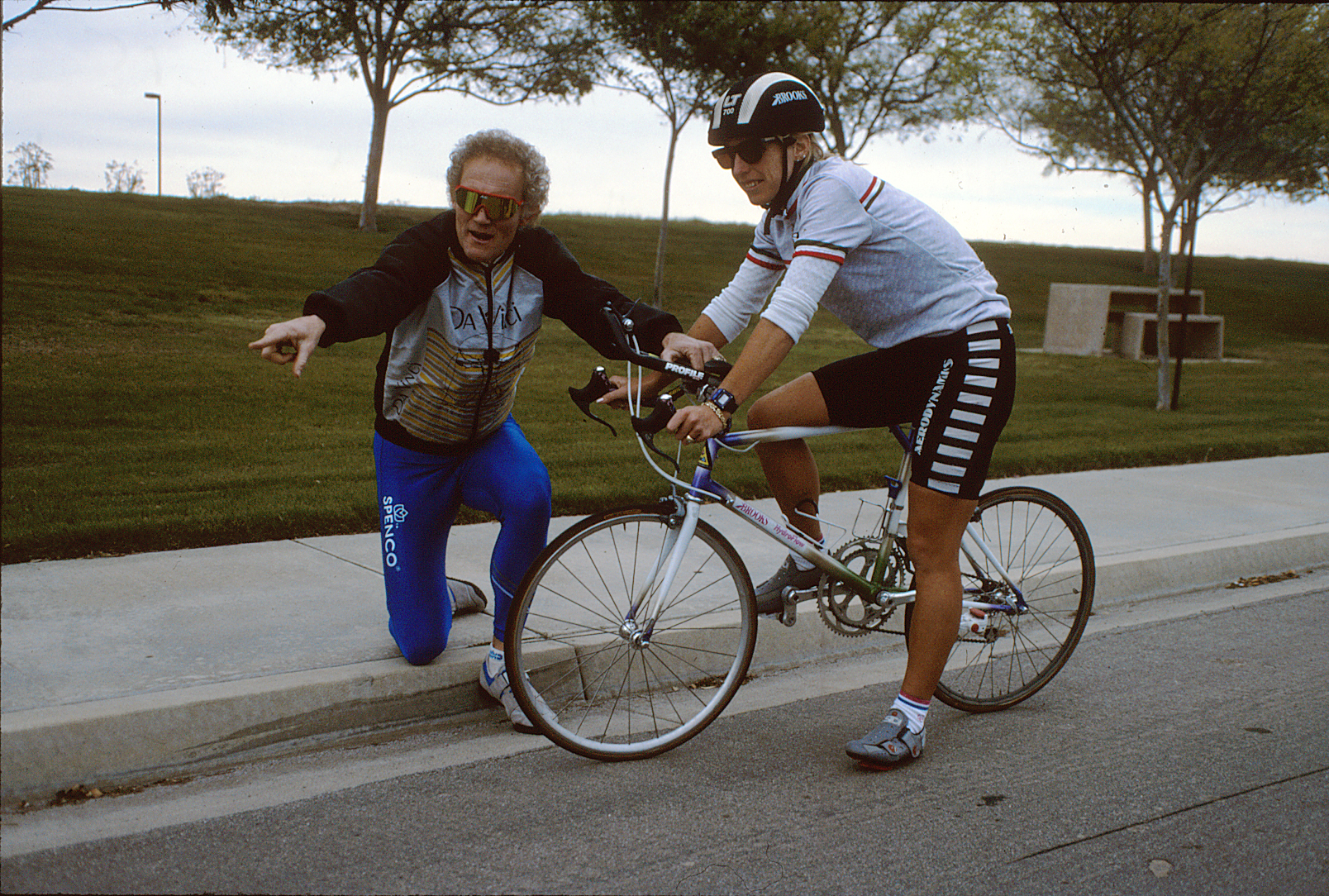
John Howard instructs Paula Newby-Fraser, Encinitas, California, 1991

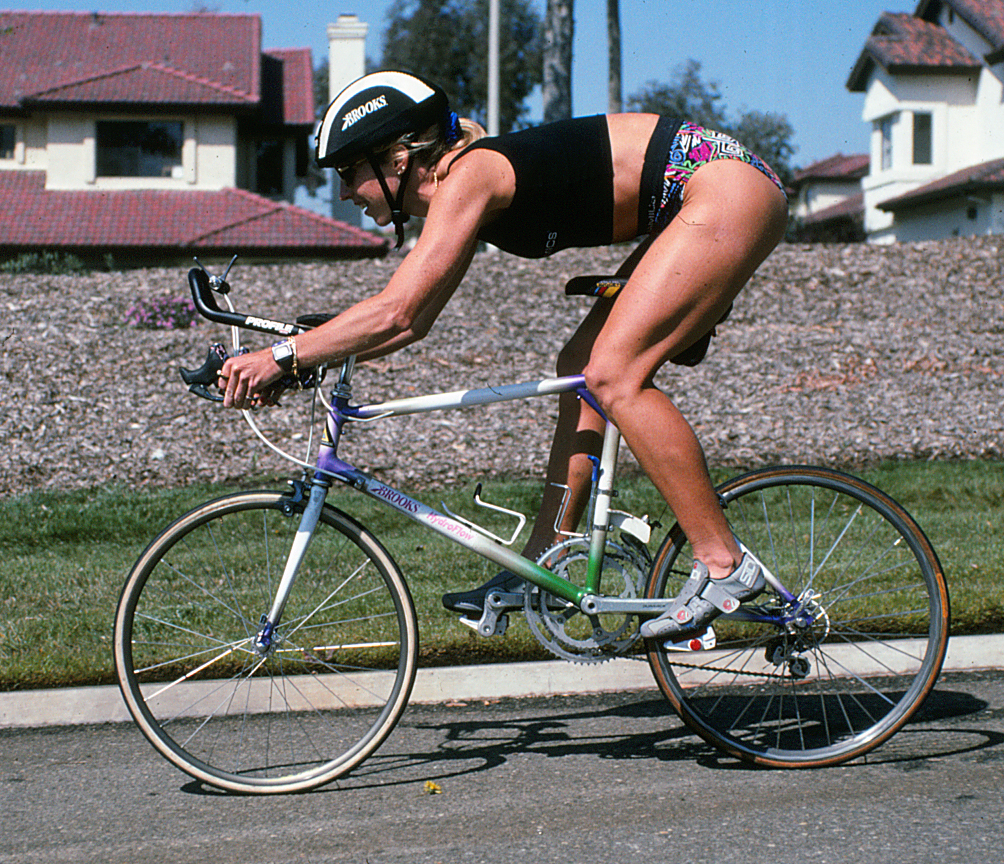
Newby-Fraser demonstrates road racing techniques in John Howard's Lessons in Cycling videotape, Encinitas, California, 1991

Later in her career, Newby-Fraser began running ultramarathons, which are running races of 50 km or more. At the Ridgecrest High Desert 50k in April 1997, she won with a new course record of 4 hours and 6 minutes.
