= Ironman World Championship =

Annual triathlon competition

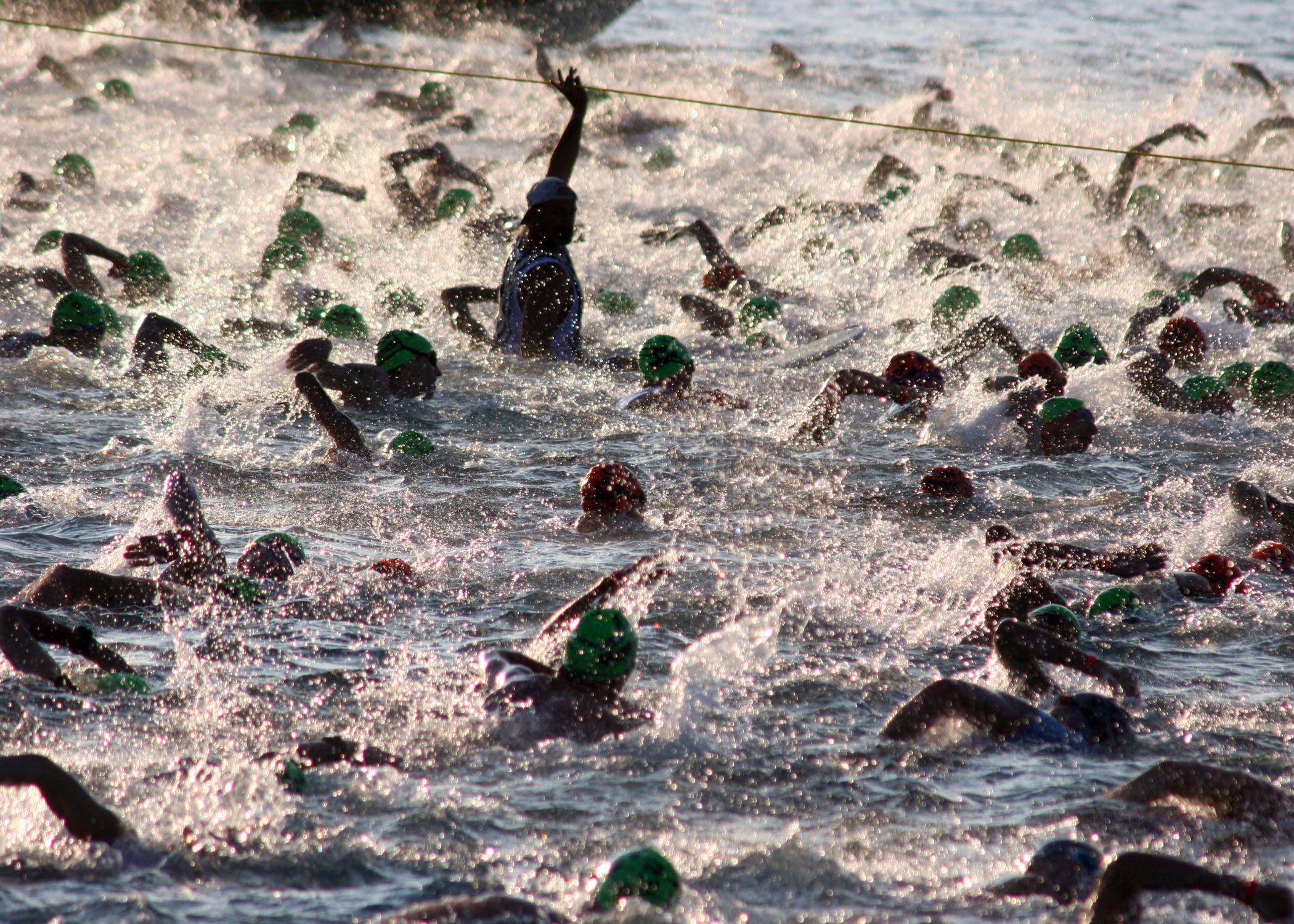
Swim start, 15 October 2005

The Ironman World Championship is a triathlon held annually in Hawaii, United States from 1978 to 2022, with no race in 2020 and an additional race in 1982. It is owned and organized by the World Triathlon Corporation. It is the annual culmination of a series of Ironman triathlon qualification races held throughout the world. From 2023 to 2025, the Men's and Women's Ironman World Championships were separated with one at Kona and the other hosted at another venue. Beginning in 2026, both the men's and women's races of the championship will once more take place in Kailua-Kona.

== History ==
From 1978 through 1980 the race was held on the island of Oahu, the course combining that of three events already held there: the Waikiki Roughwater Swim (2.4 mi./3.86 km), the Around-Oahu Bike Race (115 mi./185.07 km, originally a two-day event), and the Honolulu Marathon. The bike stage was reduced by 3 miles to link it to the start of the marathon course. In 1981 the race was moved to the less urbanized Big Island, keeping the distances the same: a 2.4 miles (3.86 km) open water swim in Kailua-Kona Bay, a 112 miles (180.25 km) bike ride across the Hawaiian lava desert to Hāwī and back, and a marathon (26 miles 385 yards, 42.195 km) run along the coast of the Big Island starting Ali'i Drive, up Palani Road to Queen Ka' ahumanu Highway, lead to the Natural Energy Laboratory Hawai'i Authority. Then following Queen Ka'ahumanu Highway back through Kona to Ali'i Drive.

Since 1982, the race has been held in the fall each year, before which it was held in the spring, giving two races in 1982.

Athletes with disabilities compete in the event in the physically challenged category, which was instituted in 1997, and are required to meet the same cutoff times as able bodied competitors. Australian John Maclean was the first physically challenged athlete to complete the event under the cut-off time.

Because of the COVID-19 pandemic, the 2020 Ironman World Championship was initially postponed to February 2021 and then canceled with that year's qualifiers able to defer to race in 2021 or 2022. The 2021 Championship was postponed to May 2022 and held in St. George, Utah due to travel restrictions.

The 2022 Ironman World Championship was split with a men's and women's race and the Women's Championship on October 6 followed by the Men's Championship two days later. Also from 2022, Vietnam's automobile maker VinFast was the first ever naming rights partner for 2022 Ironman World Championship and 2023 Ironman 70.3 World Championship.

Since 2023, the men's and women's Ironman World Championships have been split and alternated between Nice, France, and Kona, Hawaii. In 2023, the men's event held on September 10 in Nice, France, and the women's on October 14 in Kona, Hawaii. The men's and women's Championships alternate between these venues until 2026.

Qualifying for the World Championship comes from placing in one of the other Ironman races or some Ironman 70.3 races.

The current Ironman Hawaii course record was set in 2024 by Patrick Lange (Germany), who won in 7 hrs 35 min 53 sec. The women's course record is 8 hrs 24 mins 31 sec, set in 2023 by Lucy Charles-Barclay (UK).

== Course records ==
=== Men ===
Event	Record	Speed	Athlete	Nationality	Edition	Ref
Full Course	7:35:53 (47:09 - 2:20 - 4:06:22 - 2:30 - 2:37:34)		Patrick Lange	Germany	2024	
Swim (3.862 km)	45:43	1:12 min/100 m	Sam Askey-Doran	Australia	2024	
Bike (180.246 km)	3:57:22	45.56 km/h	Sam Laidlow	France	2024	
Run (42.195 km)	2:36:15	16.2 km/h / 3:42 min/km	Gustav Iden	Norway	2022	

=== Women ===
Event	Record	Speed	Athlete	Nationality	Edition	Ref
Full Course	8:24:31 (49:36 - 2:29 - 4:32:28 - 2:20 - 2:57:38)	26.91 km/h	Lucy Charles-Barclay	United Kingdom	2023	
Swim (3.862 km)	48:14	1:14 min/100 m	Lucy Charles-Barclay	United Kingdom	2018	
Bike (180.246 km)	4:26:07	40.64 km/h	Daniela Ryf	Switzerland	2018	
Run (42.195 km)	2:47:23	3:58 min/km	Kat Matthews	United Kingdom	2025	

== Medalists ==
=== Men ===
Year	Gold	Time	Silver	Time	Bronze	Time
1978	Gordon Haller (USA)	11:46:58	John Dunbar (USA)	12:20:27	Dave Orlowski (USA)	13:59:13
1979	Tom Warren (USA)	11:15:56	John Dunbar (USA)	12:03:56	Ian Emberson (USA)	12:23:30
1980	Dave Scott (USA)	9:24:33	Chuck Neumann (USA)	10:24:41	John Howard (USA)	10:32:36
1981	John Howard (USA)	9:38:29	Tom Warren (USA)	10:04:38	Scott Tinley (USA)	10:12:47
1982 (Feb)	Scott Tinley (USA)	9:19:41	Dave Scott (USA)	9:36:57	Jeff Tinley (USA)	9:53:16
1982 (Oct)	Dave Scott (USA)	9:08:23	Scott Tinley (USA)	9:28:28	Jeff Tinley (USA)	9:36:53
1983	Dave Scott (USA)	9:05:57	Scott Tinley (USA)	9:06:30	Mark Allen (USA)	9:21:06
1984	Dave Scott (USA)	8:54:20	Scott Tinley (USA)	9:18:45	Grant Boswell (USA)	9:23:55
1985	Scott Tinley (USA)	8:50:54	Chris Hinshaw (USA)	9:16:40	Carl Kupferschmid (SUI)	9:26:32
1986	Dave Scott (USA)	8:28:37	Mark Allen (USA)	8:36:04	Scott Tinley (USA)	9:00:37
1987	Dave Scott (USA)	8:34:13	Mark Allen (USA)	8:45:19	Greg Stewart (AUS)	8:58:53
1988	Scott Molina (USA)	8:31:00	Mike Pigg (USA)	8:33:11	Ken Glah (USA)	8:38:37
1989	Mark Allen (USA)	8:09:14	Dave Scott (USA)	8:10:13	Greg Welch (AUS)	8:32:16
1990	Mark Allen (USA)	8:28:17	Scott Tinley (USA)	8:37:40	Pauli Kiuru (FIN)	8:39:24
1991	Mark Allen (USA)	8:18:32	Greg Welch (AUS)	8:24:34	Jeff Devlin (USA)	8:27:55
1992	Mark Allen (USA)	8:09:08	Cristián Bustos (CHI)	8:16:29	Pauli Kiuru (FIN)	8:17:29
1993	Mark Allen (USA)	8:07:45	Pauli Kiuru (FIN)	8:14:27	Wolfgang Dittrich (GER)	8:20:13
1994	Greg Welch (AUS)	8:20:27	Dave Scott (USA)	8:24:32	Jeff Devlin (USA)	8:31:56
1995	Mark Allen (USA)	8:20:34	Thomas Hellriegel (GER)	8:22:59	Rainer Müller-Hörner (GER)	8:25:23
1996	Luc Van Lierde (BEL)	8:04:08	Thomas Hellriegel (GER)	8:06:07	Greg Welch (AUS)	8:18:57
1997	Thomas Hellriegel (GER)	8:33:01	Jürgen Zäck (GER)	8:39:18	Lothar Leder (GER)	8:40:30
1998	Peter Reid (CAN)	8:24:20	Luc Van Lierde (BEL)	8:31:57	Lothar Leder (GER)	8:32:57
1999	Luc Van Lierde (BEL)	8:17:17	Peter Reid (CAN)	8:22:54	Tim DeBoom (USA)	8:25:42
2000	Peter Reid (CAN)	8:21:01	Tim DeBoom (USA)	8:23:10	Normann Stadler (GER)	8:26:45
2001	Tim DeBoom (USA)	8:31:18	Cameron Brown (NZL)	8:46:10	Thomas Hellriegel (GER)	8:47:40
2002	Tim DeBoom (USA)	8:29:56	Peter Reid (CAN)	8:33:06	Cameron Brown (NZL)	8:35:34
2003	Peter Reid (CAN)	8:22:35	Rutger Beke (BEL)	8:28:27	Cameron Brown (NZL)	8:30:08
2004	Normann Stadler (GER)	8:33:29	Peter Reid (CAN)	8:43:40	Faris Al-Sultan (GER)	8:45:14
2005	Faris Al-Sultan (GER)	8:14:17	Cameron Brown (NZL)	8:19:36	Peter Reid (CAN)	8:20:04
2006	Normann Stadler (GER)	8:11:58	Chris McCormack (AUS)	8:13:10	Faris Al-Sultan (GER)	8:19:05
2007	Chris McCormack (AUS)	8:15:34	Craig Alexander (AUS)	8:19:04	Torbjørn Sindballe (DEN)	8:21:30
2008	Craig Alexander (AUS)	8:17:45	Eneko Llanos (ESP)	8:20:50	Rutger Beke (BEL)	8:21:23
2009	Craig Alexander (AUS)	8:20:21	Chris Lieto (USA)	8:22:56	Andreas Raelert (GER)	8:24:32
2010	Chris McCormack (AUS)	8:10:37	Andreas Raelert (GER)	8:12:17	Marino Vanhoenacker (BEL)	8:13:14
2011	Craig Alexander (AUS)	8:03:56	Pete Jacobs (AUS)	8:09:11	Andreas Raelert (GER)	8:11:07
2012	Pete Jacobs (AUS)	8:18:37	Andreas Raelert (GER)	8:23:40	Frederik Van Lierde (BEL)	8:24:09
2013	Frederik Van Lierde (BEL)	8:12:29	Luke McKenzie (AUS)	8:15:19	Sebastian Kienle (GER)	8:19:24
2014	Sebastian Kienle (GER)	8:14:18	Ben Hoffman (USA)	8:19:23	Jan Frodeno (GER)	8:20:32
2015	Jan Frodeno (GER)	8:14:40	Andreas Raelert (GER)	8:17:43	Timothy O'Donnell (USA)	8:18:50
2016	Jan Frodeno (GER)	8:06:30	Sebastian Kienle (GER)	8:10:02	Patrick Lange (GER)	8:11:14
2017	Patrick Lange (GER)	8:01:40	Lionel Sanders (CAN)	8:04:07	David McNamee (GBR)	8:07:11
2018	Patrick Lange (GER)	7:52:39	Bart Aernouts (BEL)	7:56:41	David McNamee (GBR)	8:01:09
2019	Jan Frodeno (GER)	7:51:13	Tim O'Donnell (USA)	7:59:40	Sebastian Kienle (GER)	8:02:04
2021^{‡}	Kristian Blummenfelt (NOR)	7:49:16	Lionel Sanders (CAN)	7:54:03	Braden Currie (NZL)	7:54:19
2022	Gustav Iden (NOR)	7:40:24	Sam Laidlow (FRA)	7:42:24	Kristian Blummenfelt (NOR)	7:43:23
2023	Sam Laidlow (FRA)	8:06:22	Patrick Lange (GER)	8:10:17	Magnus Ditlev (DEN)	8:11:43
2024	Patrick Lange (GER)	7:35:53 CR	Magnus Ditlev (DEN)	7:43:39	Rudy Von Berg (USA)	7:46:00
2025	Casper Stornes (NOR)	7:51:39	Gustav Iden (NOR)	7:54:13	Kristian Blummenfelt (NOR)	7:56:36
2026	Vincent Luis (FRA)	7:47:27	Gustav Iden (NOR)	7:49:02	Matthew Marquardt (USA)	7:49:58

Winners by country

- 20: United States
- 11: Germany
- 7: Australia
- 3: Belgium Canada Norway
- 2: France

^{‡}The 2021 World Championship was held in St. George, Utah on May 7, 2022. The delay and change from the original Kona, Hawaii venue were due to the COVID-19 pandemic.

=== Women ===
Year	Gold	Time	Silver	Time	Bronze	Time
1979	Lyn Lemaire (USA)	12:55:38				
1980	Robin Beck (USA)	11:21:24	Eve Anderson (USA)	15:40:59		
1981	Linda Sweeney (USA)	12:02:32	Sally Edwards (USA)	12:37:25	Lyn Brooks (USA)	12:42:15
1982 (Feb)	Kathleen McCartney (USA)	11:09:40	Julie Moss (USA)	11:10:09	Lyn Brooks (USA); Sally Edwards (USA)	11:51:00
1982 (Oct)	Julie Leach (USA)	10:54:08	Jo Ann Dahlkoetter (USA)	10:58:21	Sally Edwards (USA)	11:03:00
1983	Sylviane Puntous (CAN)	10:43:36	Patricia Puntous (CAN)	10:49:17	Eva Ueltzen (USA)	11:01:49
1984	Sylviane Puntous (CAN)	10:25:13	Patricia Puntous (CAN)	10:27:28	Julie Olson (USA)	10:38:10
1985	Joanne Ernst (USA)	10:25:22	Elizabeth Bulman (USA)	10:26:55	Paula Newby-Fraser (ZIM)	10:31:04
1986	Paula Newby-Fraser (ZIM)	9:49:14	Sylviane Puntous (CAN)	9:53:13	Joanne Ernst (USA)	10:00:07
1987	Erin Baker (NZL)	9:35:25	Sylviane Puntous (CAN)	9:36:57	Paula Newby-Fraser (ZIM)	9:40:37
1988	Paula Newby-Fraser (ZIM)	9:01:01	Erin Baker (NZL)	9:12:14	Kirsten Hanssen (USA)	9:37:25
1989	Paula Newby-Fraser (ZIM)	9:00:56	Sylviane Puntous (CAN)	9:21:55	Kirsten Hanssen (USA)	9:24:31
1990	Erin Baker (NZL)	9:13:42	Paula Newby-Fraser (ZIM)	9:20:01	Terri Schneider (USA)	10:00:34
1991	Paula Newby-Fraser (ZIM)	9:07:52	Erin Baker (NZL)	9:23:37	Sarah Coope (GBR)	9:33:20
1992	Paula Newby-Fraser (ZIM)	8:55:28	Julie Anne White (CAN)	9:21:40	Thea Sybesma (NED)	9:26:57
1993	Paula Newby-Fraser (ZIM)	8:58:23	Erin Baker (NZL)	9:08:04	Susan Latshaw (USA)	9:20:40
1994	Paula Newby-Fraser (ZIM)	9:20:14	Karen Smyers (USA)	9:28:08	Fernanda Keller (BRA)	9:43:30
1995	Karen Smyers (USA)	9:16:46	Isabelle Mouthon (FRA)	9:25:13	Fernanda Keller (BRA)	9:37:48
1996	Paula Newby-Fraser^{†} (USA)	9:06:49	Natascha Badmann (SUI)	9:11:19	Karen Smyers (USA)	9:19:13
1997	Heather Fuhr (CAN)	9:31:43	Lori Bowden (CAN)	9:41:42	Fernanda Keller (BRA)	9:50:02
1998	Natascha Badmann (SUI)	9:24:16	Lori Bowden (CAN)	9:27:19	Fernanda Keller (BRA)	9:28:29
1999	Lori Bowden (CAN)	9:13:02	Karen Smyers (USA)	9:20:40	Fernanda Keller (BRA)	9:24:30
2000	Natascha Badmann (SUI)	9:26:17	Lori Bowden (CAN)	9:29:05	Fernanda Keller (BRA)	9:31:29
2001	Natascha Badmann (SUI)	9:28:37	Lori Bowden (CAN)	9:32:59	Nina Kraft (GER)	9:41:01
2002	Natascha Badmann (SUI)	9:07:54	Nina Kraft (GER)	9:14:24	Lori Bowden (CAN)	9:22:27
2003	Lori Bowden (CAN)	9:11:55	Natascha Badmann (SUI)	9:17:08	Nina Kraft (GER)	9:17:16
2004	Natascha Badmann (SUI)	9:50:04	Heather Fuhr (CAN)	9:56:19	Kate Major (AUS)	10:01:56
2005	Natascha Badmann (SUI)	9:09:30	Michellie Jones (AUS)	9:11:51	Kate Major (AUS)	9:12:39
2006	Michellie Jones (AUS)	9:18:31	Desiree Ficker (USA)	9:24:02	Lisa Bentley (CAN)	9:25:18
2007	Chrissie Wellington (GBR)	9:08:45	Samantha McGlone (CAN)	9:14:04	Kate Major (AUS)	9:19:13
2008	Chrissie Wellington (GBR)	9:06:23	Yvonne van Vlerken (NED)	9:21:20	Sandra Wallenhorst (GER)	9:22:52
2009	Chrissie Wellington (GBR)	8:54:02	Mirinda Carfrae (AUS)	9:13:59	Virginia Berasategui (ESP)	9:15:28
2010	Mirinda Carfrae (AUS)	8:58:36	Caroline Steffen (SUI)	9:06:00	Julie Dibens (GBR)	9:10:04
2011	Chrissie Wellington (GBR)	8:55:08	Mirinda Carfrae (AUS)	8:57:57	Leanda Cave (GBR)	9:03:29
2012	Leanda Cave (GBR)	9:15:54	Caroline Steffen (SUI)	9:16:58	Mirinda Carfrae (AUS)	9:21:41
2013	Mirinda Carfrae (AUS)	8:52:14	Rachel Joyce (GBR)	8:57:28	Liz Blatchford (GBR)	9:03:35
2014	Mirinda Carfrae (AUS)	9:00:55	Daniela Ryf (SUI)	9:02:57	Rachel Joyce (GBR)	9:04:23
2015	Daniela Ryf (SUI)	8:57:57	Rachel Joyce (GBR)	9:10:59	Liz Blatchford (GBR)	9:14:52
2016	Daniela Ryf (SUI)	8:46:46	Mirinda Carfrae (AUS)	9:10:30	Heather Jackson (USA)	9:11:32
2017	Daniela Ryf (SUI)	8:50:47	Lucy Charles-Barclay (GBR)	8:59:38	Sarah Crowley (AUS)	9:01:38
2018	Daniela Ryf (SUI)	8:26:18	Lucy Charles-Barclay (GBR)	8:36:32	Anne Haug (GER)	8:41:57
2019	Anne Haug (GER)	8:40:10	Lucy Charles-Barclay (GBR)	8:46:44	Sarah Crowley (AUS)	8:48:13
2021^{‡}	Daniela Ryf (SUI)	8:34:59	Kat Matthews (GBR)	8:43:49	Anne Haug (GER)	8:47:03
2022	Chelsea Sodaro (USA)	8:33:46	Lucy Charles-Barclay (GBR)	8:41:37	Anne Haug (GER)	8:42:22
2023	Lucy Charles-Barclay (GBR)	8:24:31 CR	Anne Haug (GER)	8:27:33	Laura Philipp (GER)	8:32:55
2024	Laura Philipp (GER)	8:45:15	Kat Matthews (GBR)	8:53:20	Chelsea Sodaro (USA)	9:04:38
2025	Solveig Løvseth (NOR)	8:28:27	Kat Matthews (GBR)	8:29:02	Laura Philipp (GER)	8:37:28
2026	Taylor Knibb (USA)	8:36:29	Laura Philipp (GER)	8:39:33	Julie Derron (SUI)	8:46:24

Winners by country

- 11: Switzerland
- 10: United States
- 7: Zimbabwe
- 6: Great Britain
- 5: Canada
- 4: Australia
- 2: New Zealand
- 2: Germany
- 1: Norway

^{†}Paula Newby Fraser was a citizen and represented the United States for the 1996 race.

^{‡}The 2021 World Championship was held in St. George, Utah on May 7, 2022. The delay and change from the original Kona, Hawaii venue were due to the COVID-19 pandemic.

== Ironman lottery ==
Until 2015, individuals could enter a lottery for the chance to participate in the Ironman World Championship. The lottery entry fee was $50 and afforded the chance to win one of 100 berths in the championship race. If selected the winners then had to pay the normal entry fee.

However, according to a sworn complaint filed with the U.S. District Court in Tampa, Florida, Ironman illegally charged athletes for a chance to win the opportunity to compete in the Ironman World Championship. According to Florida law, the state where the World Triathlon Corporation resides, it is illegal to set up and charge for a lottery. Because WTC charged a $50 fee to enter the lottery, instead of giving away the opportunity to win a slot at the championships, they were in violation of this law. Following the complaint WTC cooperated with the United States Attorneys office and the FBI's investigation of the matter and agreed to forfeit $2,761,910, the amount collected from the lottery since October 24, 2012. The attorney representing the United States in the matter was 8-time Ironman finisher James A. Muench.

Winners of the 2015 lottery were notified on March 17, 2015, prior to the announcement of the complaint. WTC stated that these winners would be unaffected by this decision and that their slots for the upcoming championship race would be honored.
