= Peter Reid (triathlete) =

Canadian triathlete

Personal information
- Born: 27 May 1969 (age 57) Montreal, Quebec, Canada
Medal record
Men's triathlon
Representing Canada
ITU Long Distance World Championships
| Bronze medal – third place | 1995 Nice | Elite |
Ironman World Championship
| Gold medal – first place | 1998 | Elite |
| Gold medal – first place | 2000 | Elite |
| Gold medal – first place | 2003 | Elite |
| Silver medal – second place | 1999 | Elite |
| Silver medal – second place | 2002 | Elite |
| Silver medal – second place | 2004 | Elite |
| Bronze medal – third place | 2005 | Elite |

Peter Reid (born 27 May 1969 in Montreal, Quebec) is a Canadian former elite level triathlete. He gained fame mainly by winning ten Ironman triathlons, including winning the Ironman World Championship (in Kailua Kona, Hawaii) three times. During his career as a triathlete Reid lived and trained in Victoria, British Columbia. In June 2006, Reid announced that he was retiring from triathlon. As of 2014, he is a float plane pilot on Canada's west coast. Reid was inducted into Canada Sports Hall of Fame in 2011, the BC Sports Hall of Fame in 2013 and the Greater Victoria Sports Hall of Fame in 2010.

== Results ==
| Race | Date | Swim | Bike | Run | Total |
|---|---|---|---|---|---|
| Ironman Hawaii | 15 October 2005 | 00:52:23 | 04:27:51 | 02:55:59 | 08:20:04 |
| Ironman Hawaii | 2 October 2004 | 00:53:12 | 05:01:38 | 02:46:10 | 08:34:50 |
| Ironman Germany | 6 July 2004 | 00:48:34 | 04:41:37 | 03:01:05 | 08:34:50 |
| Wildflower | 4 May 2004 | 00:25:19 | 02:22:58 | 01:19:07 | 04:09:12 |
| Xterra World Championship | 7 October 2003 | 00:19:29 | 01:41:32 | 00:40:14 | 02:41:15 |
| Ironman Hawaii | 1 October 2003 | 00:50:36 | 04:40:04 | 02:47:38 | 08:22:35 |
| Timberman Half Iron Triathlon | 1 August 2003 | 00:26:08 | 02:14:12 | 01:18:01 | 04:00:21 |
| Ironman Germany | 4 July 2003 | 00:49:21 | 04:31:07 | 02:58:23 | 08:21:59 |
| Escape from Alcatraz | 7 June 2003 | 00:34:21 | 00:48:31 | 00:45:38 | 02:13:18 |
| Utah Half Ironman | 7 May 2003 | 00:26:35 | 02:11:19 | 01:25:01 | 04:05:27 |
| Wildflower | 10 May 2003 | 00:24:02 | 02:34:15 | 01:19:52 | 04:20:08 |
| Ironman Hawaii | 2 October 2002 | 00:53:20 | 04:44:15 | 02:53:48 | 08:33:06 |
| Ironman Canada | 1 August 2001 | 00:53:08 | 04:35:12 | 02:57:05 | 08:27:47 |
| Ironman Hawaii | 1 October 2000 | 00:51:46 | 04:39:33 | 02:48:11 | 08:21:01 |
| Ironman Canada | 1 August 2000 | 00:51:07 | 04:45:15 | 02:50:59 | 08:29:49 |
| Laguna Phuket Triathlon | 3 November 1999 | 00:21:00 | 01:25:09 | 00:44:48 | 02:31:00 |
| Ironman Hawaii | 2 October 1999 | 00:50:46 | 04:41:39 | 02:47:56 | 08:22:54 |
| Ironman Austria | 1 July 1999 | 00:48:28 | 04:25:08 | 02:35:21 | 07:51:56 |
| Ironman Australia | 1 May 1999 | 00:50:11 | 04:44:47 | 02:48:13 | 08:23:10 |
| Ironman Hawaii | 1 October 1999 | 00:52:04 | 04:42:23 | 02:47:31 | 08:24:20 |
| Ironman Australia | 1 April 1998 | 00:48:45 | 04:39:34 | 02:52:08 | 08:20:27 |
| Wildflower | 2 February 1998 | | | | 04:07:38 |
| Ironman Hawaii | 4 October 1997 | 00:52:24 | 04:56:32 | 02:54:20 | 08:43:16 |
| Ironman Lanzarote | 1 May 1997 | 00:50:09 | 05:03:36 | 03:01:40 | 08:55:25 |
| Ironman Australia | 1 April 1997 | 00:48:26 | 04:31:28 | 02:48:56 | 08:08:50 |
| Ironman Hawaii | 4 October 1996 | 00:54:22 | 04:30:33 | 02:59:42 | 08:24:37 |
| Ironman Europe | 4 July 1996 | 00:49:26 | 04:31:09 | 03:00:44 | 08:21:19 |
