= Rutger Beke =

Belgian triathlete

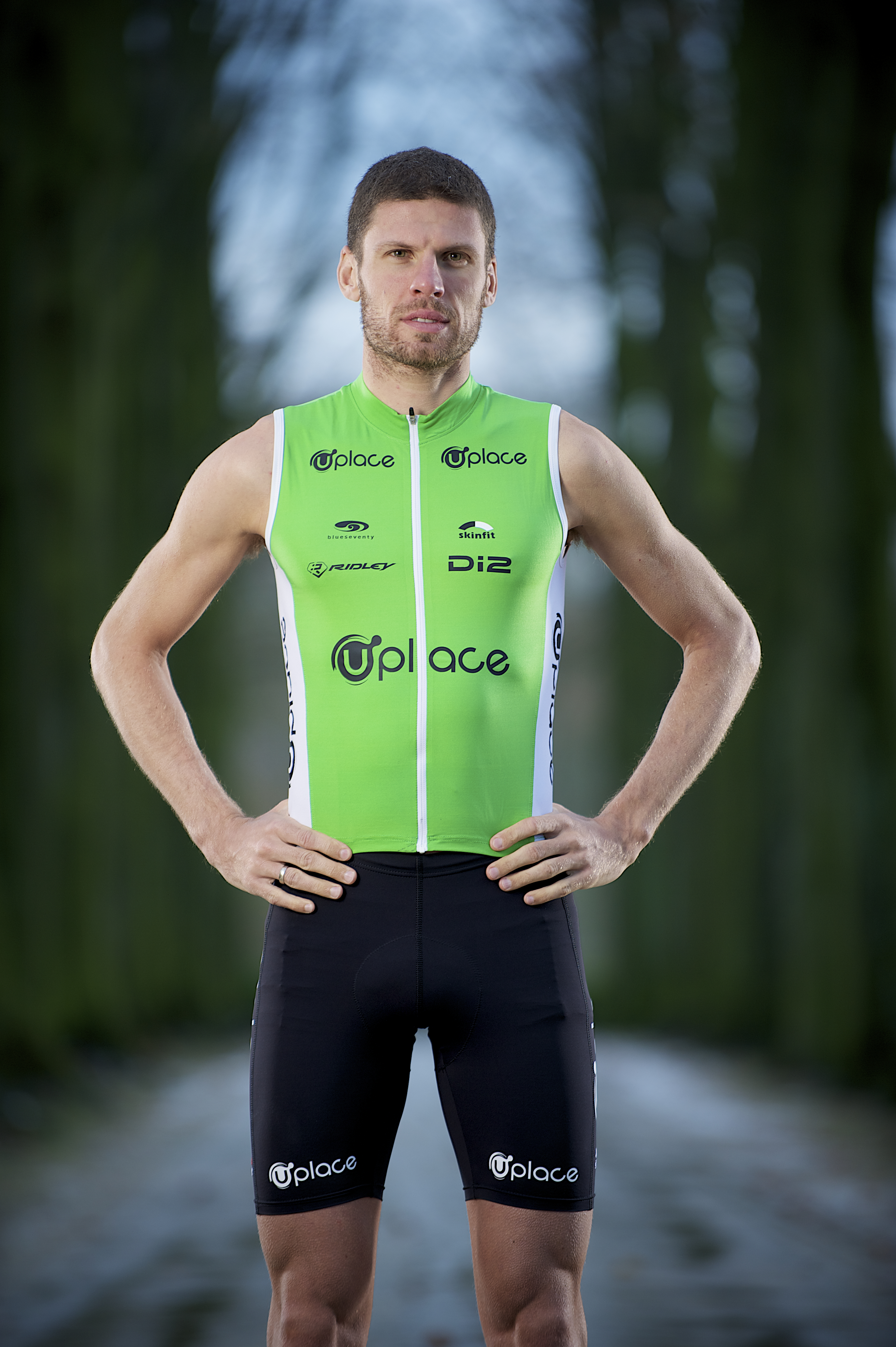

Personal information
- Born: 8 August 1977 (age 48) Halle, Belgium

Sport
- Country: Belgium
- Team: Uplace Pro Triathlon Team
- Coached by: Pieter Timmermans
Medal record
Representing Belgium
Men's triathlon
Ironman World Championships
Silver medal – second place	2003	Individual
Bronze medal – third place	2008	Individual

Rutger Beke (pronounced "bay-kuh") (Halle, 8 August 1977) is a retired Belgian triathlete living in Leuven. Beke competed for the Uplace Pro Triathlon Team until he announced his retirement from professional triathlon on 31 May 2011.

Rutger Beke started competing in the sport of triathlon when he was 17. He performed well in several Ironman races, including five top five placings in the Ironman Hawaii.

Beke became well known because of his alleged EPO use. In 2004, he was tested positive in both his A- and B-sample for EPO. He was suspended from competition for 18 months. In August 2005, the Commission reversed its decision and exonerated him based on scientific and medical information presented by Beke. He asserted that his sample had become degraded as a result of bacterial contamination and that the substance identified by the laboratory as pharmaceutical EPO was, in fact, an unrelated protein indistinguishable from pharmaceutical EPO in the test method. He claimed, therefore, that the test had produced a false positive result in his case.

In 2007, he was the 5th Belgian who won an Ironman, together with Luc Van Lierde, Dirk van Gossum, Marino Vanhoenacker and Gerrit Schellens.

== Results ==
- 2000: 1st in Belgian Olympic distance triathlon
- 2001: 1st in Belgian Olympic distance triathlon
- 2002: 1st in Belgian long-distance triathlon
- 2002: 3rd in ITU World Championships – Nice
- 2003: 1st in Belgian Olympic distance triathlon
- 2003: 1st in Belgian long-distance triathlon
- 2003: 3rd in Ironman Florida
- 2003: 2nd in Ironman Hawaii
- 2003: 2nd in ITU World Championships – Ibiza
- 2003: 2nd in Ironman Hawaii
- 2004: 1st in Belgian Olympic distance triathlon
- 2004: 5th in Ironman Hawaii
- 2005: 1st in Ironman 70.3 Monaco
- 2005: 4th in Ironman Hawaii
- 2006: 4th in Ironman Hawaii
- 2007: 1st in Ironman Arizona
- 2007: 898th in Ironman Hawaii
- 2008: 3rd in Ironman Hawaii
- 2009: 1st in Ironman Cozumel
