= Mark Allen (triathlete) =

American triathlete

Medal record

Men's triathlon

Representing the United States

ITU World Championships
| Gold medal – first place | 1989 Avignon | Individual |

Ironman World Championship
| Gold medal – first place | 1995 | Men's race |
| Gold medal – first place | 1993 | Men's race |
| Gold medal – first place | 1992 | Men's race |
| Gold medal – first place | 1991 | Men's race |
| Gold medal – first place | 1990 | Men's race |
| Gold medal – first place | 1989 | Men's race |
| Silver medal – second place | 1987 | Men's race |
| Silver medal – second place | 1986 | Men's race |
| Bronze medal – third place | 1983 | Men's race |

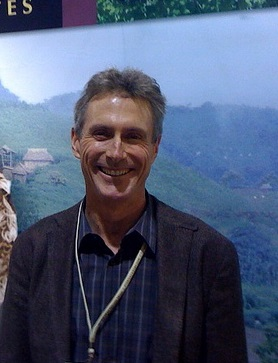

Mark Allen (born January 12, 1958, in Glendale, California) is an American triathlete and six-time Ironman Triathlon World Champion.

== Education ==
He graduated from UC San Diego, where he was an All-American swimmer, with a degree in biology.

== Career ==
After competing and losing in the Ironman Triathlon Championships six times (often to Dave Scott), Allen emerged victorious in 1989, winning one of the most difficult one-day sporting events in the world.

This was the first of six Ironman victories for Allen, the last coming in 1995 at age 37, making him the oldest winner of the event at that time. He has also excelled at the Olympic distance, winning the sport's inaugural World Championships in 1989 in Avignon, France, by more than a minute. He was undefeated in 10 trips to the Nice International Championships, and from 1988 to 1990 he had a winning streak of 21 races.

Over the course of his racing career, which ended in 1996, he maintained a 90% average in top-three finishes. He was named Triathlete of the Year six times by Triathlete magazine, and in 1997 Outside magazine dubbed him The World's Fittest Man. Allen was inducted into the Ironman Triathlon Hall of Fame in 1997. He has also been inducted into the USAT Hall of Fame and the ITU Hall of Fame.

Allen has summarized his career in four characters: "1-6-21-infinity". "1" is for his victory in the first official triathlon World Championship. "6" is for the six times he won the Ironman. 21 stands for his two season run of 21 straight victories, along the way defeating every one of the top 50 triathletes in the world. "Infinity" represents his acknowledgement by ESPN as "The Greatest Endurance Athlete of All Time."

Allen owns and operates Mark Allen Coaching, a global online triathlon coaching concern.

== Results ==
| YEAR | RACE | POSITION | SWIM | BIKE | RUN | RESULT |
|---|---|---|---|---|---|---|
| 1995 | Ironman World Championship, Kona, Hawaii, US | 1st | 51:50 | 4:46:35 | 2:42:09 | 8:20:34 |
| 1993 | Ironman World Championship, Kona, Hawaii, US | 1st | --- | --- | --- | 8:07:46 |
| 1992 | Ironman World Championship, Kona, Hawaii, US | 1st | --- | --- | --- | 8:09:08 |
| 1991 | Ironman World Championship, Kona, Hawaii, US | 1st | --- | --- | --- | 8:18:32 |
| 1990 | Ironman World Championship, Kona, Hawaii, US | 1st | --- | --- | --- | 8:28:17 |
| 1989 | Ironman World Championship, Kona, Hawaii, US | 1st | --- | --- | --- | 8:09:14 |
| 1988 | Ironman World Championship, Kona, Hawaii, US | 5th | --- | --- | --- | 8:43:22 |
| 1987 | Ironman World Championship, Kona, Hawaii, US | 2nd | --- | --- | --- | 8:45:19 |
| 1986 | Ironman World Championship, Kona, Hawaii, US | 2nd | --- | --- | --- | 8:36:04 |
| 1984 | Ironman World Championship, Kona, Hawaii, US | 5th | --- | --- | --- | 9:35:02 |
| 1983 | Ironman World Championship, Kona, Hawaii, US | 3rd | --- | --- | --- | 9:21:06 |
| 1982 | Ironman World Championship, Kona, Hawaii, US | DNF | --- | --- | --- | --- |

- DNF - Did not finish
