= Heather Fuhr =

Canadian triathlete (born 1968)

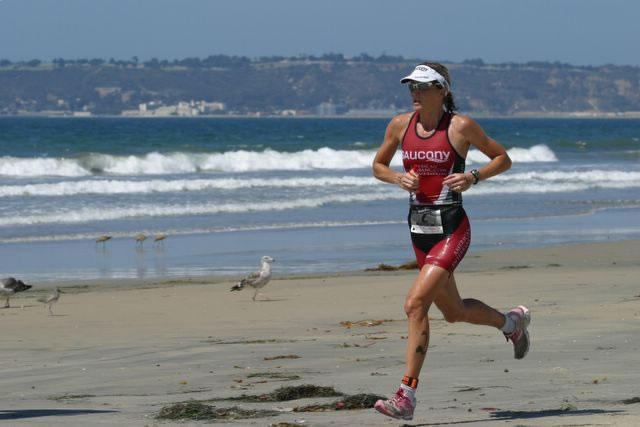

Medal record

Women's Triathlon

Representing Canada

Ironman World Championship
Gold medal – first place	1997	Individual
Silver medal – second place	2004	Individual

Heather Fuhr (born January 19, 1968, in Edmonton, Alberta) is a Canadian triathlete, considered one of the best women runners in triathlon. Fuhr was the Ironman Triathlon World Champion in 1997. Among her other victories are winning Ironman USA in 1999, 2001–2003 and 2005. She is married to Roch Frey. Fuhr starred in the documentary What It Takes in 2006.

In 2015, Fuhr and Lori Bowden were inducted into the Ironman Hall of Fame.
