= Lori Bowden =

Canadian triathlete (born 1967)

Personal information
- Born: June 13, 1967 (age 59) Fergus, Ontario, Canada
Medal record
Women's triathlon
Ironman World Championship
Gold medal – first place	1999	Elite
Gold medal – first place	2003	Elite
Silver medal – second place	1997	Elite
Silver medal – second place	1998	Elite
Silver medal – second place	2000	Elite
Silver medal – second place	2001	Elite
Bronze medal – third place	2002	Elite

Lori Chestnut (née Bowden; born June 13, 1967) is a Canadian triathlete.

Bowden competed at the Ironman distance in the sport, her first win coming at Ironman Canada in Penticton in 1997. She went on to record a number of other victories and won the Ironman Triathlon World Championships in Kailua-Kona, Hawaii in 1999 and 2003.

Bowden helped organize the Royal Victoria Marathon. In 2015, she and Heather Fuhr were inducted into the Ironman Hall of Fame.
