= Chelsea Sodaro =

American professional triathlete

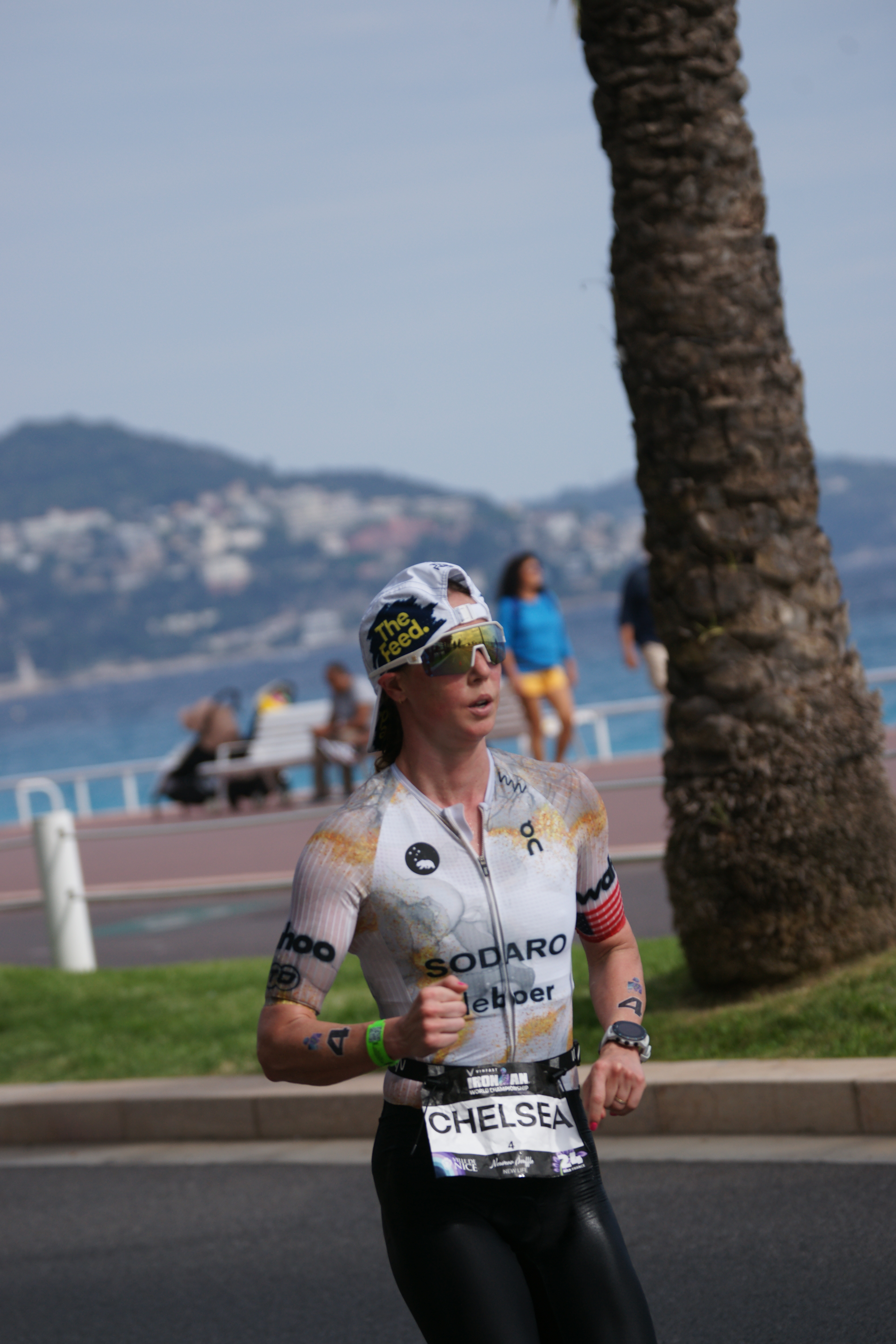

Chelsea Reilly Sodaro (born May 9, 1989, in San Luis Obispo, California) is an American professional triathlete. She won the Ironman World Championship in 2022.

== Background ==
After graduating from Davis High School in Davis, California, Sodaro attended University of California, Berkeley on an athletic scholarship. While at Cal, she earned All-American honors as a senior in cross-country and track. She ended her college career with a ninth-place finish in the women's 5000 meters at the 2012 NCAA Championships

As a professional runner, Sodaro won two national titles. She won the USA 10 km road championships in 2012, in her debut at that distance. At 2013 USATF Indoor Championships, she won the 3000m race, edging out Emily Infeld. She was coached by fellow Cal alum and Olympian Magdalena Boulet.

In 2017, she transitioned from running to triathlon.

== Triathlon ==
In October 2022, Sodaro won the Ironman World Championship at Kona, Hawaii, becoming the first rookie world champion since Chrissie Wellington and first American woman to win since 1996. It was the second Ironman distance triathlon of her career.
