= 2007 Ironman 70.3 World Championship =

The 2007 Ironman 70.3 World Championship was a triathlon competition held in Clearwater, Florida on November 10, 2007. The championship was sponsored by Ford and organized by the World Triathlon Corporation (WTC). The championship was the culmination of the Ironman 70.3 series of events that occurred from November 2006 through September 2007. Athletes, both professional and amateur, earned a spot in the championship race by qualifying in races throughout the 70.3 series.

== Medallists ==
=== Men ===
Pos.	Time (h:mm:ss)	Name	Country	Split times (h:mm:ss)				
Pos.	Time (h:mm:ss)	Name	Country	Swim	T1	Bike	T2	Run
Gold medal	3:42:33	Andy Potts	United States	22:57	1:49	2:04:29	1:46	1:11:33
Silver medal	3:42:37	Oscar Galíndez	Argentina	25:07	2:02	2:00:28	1:58	1:13:02
Bronze medal	3:43:11	Andrew Johns	Great Britain	23:30	1:50	2:04:11	1:37	1:12:05
4	3:44:10	Craig Alexander	Australia	23:30	1:52	2:04:05	1:39	1:13:04
5	3:45:05	Richie Cunningham	Australia	23:18	1:47	2:04:23	1:46	1:13:51
6	3:46:03	Stéphan Bignet	France	23:10	2:02	2:04:19	1:50	1:14:42
7	3:49:03	Fraser Cartmell	United Kingdom	23:09	1:52	2:04:28	2:19	1:17:15
8	3:49:39	T. J. Tollakson	United States	24:27	2:05	2:02:54	1:50	1:18:23
9	3:50:10	Terenzo Bozzone	New Zealand	23:08	1:51	2:02:51	1:36	1:20:44
10	3:51:45	Santiago Ascenço	Brazil	25:23	1:56	2:08:27	1:34	1:14:25
*Source:

=== Women ===
Pos.	Time (h:mm:ss)	Name	Country	Split times (h:mm:ss)				
Pos.	Time (h:mm:ss)	Name	Country	Swim	T1	Bike	T2	Run
Gold medal	4:07:25	Mirinda Carfrae	Australia	26:33	2:01	2:18:32	1:39	1:18:40
Silver medal	4:11:29	Samantha McGlone	Canada	27:46	1:59	2:19:00	1:53	1:20:51
Bronze medal	4:12:29	Leanda Cave	Great Britain	25:16	2:07	2:17:12	1:59	1:25:55
4	4:12:53	Julie Dibens	United Kingdom	24:45	2:08	2:13:16	1:48	1:30:56
5	4:14:40	Catriona Morrison	United Kingdom	27:46	2:07	2:17:21	1:56	1:25:30
6	4:16:35	Sibylle Matter	Switzerland	26:06	2:13	2:18:51	1:59	1:27:26
7	4:16:59	Becky Lavelle	United States	25:23	2:00	2:17:07	1:57	1:30:32
8	4:18:20	Kate Major	Australia	28:58	2:18	2:20:47	1:45	1:24:32
9	4:18:31	Monika Lehmann	Switzerland	29:21	2:34	2:18:55	2:06	1:25:35
10	4:19:08	Michelle Lee	United Kingdom	29:23	2:49	2:20:16	2:13	1:24:27

== Qualification ==
The 2007 Ironman 70.3 Series featured 23 events that enabled qualification to the 2007 World Championship event. In the second year of WTC's 70.3 race series the number of races increased as the series expanded outside of North America with new events such as those in Austria, Germany, Monaco, Singapore, and Switzerland.

Qualifying for the 2007 Ironman 70.3 Championship was based on allocated slots available at each qualifying event, usually 50, though could vary from race to race. Slots were allocated to amateur triathletes in each age group category, male and female, with the number of slots given out based on that category's proportional representation of the overall field. Each age group category would be tentatively allocated one qualifying spot in each qualifying event. Professional athletes could qualify for the championships by obtaining one of the 10% of the available qualifying spots at that event. Thus, if 50 available spots were allocated, 45 slots would be distributed among the amateur athletes and 5 were available to pro athletes.

=== Qualifying Ironman 70.3s ===
Date	Event	Location
Nov 5, 2006	Ironman 70.3 Australia	(Australia) Port Macquarie, New South Wales
Nov 11, 2006	Ironman 70.3 World Championship	(United States) Clearwater, Florida
Mar 31, 2007	Ironman 70.3 California^{†}	(United States) Oceanside, California
May 6, 2007	Ironman 70.3 St Croix^{†}	(United States Virgin Islands) Saint Croix, U.S. Virgin Islands
May 20, 2007	Ironman 70.3 Florida	(United States) Haines City, Florida
Jun 2, 2007	Ironman 70.3 Austria	St. Pölten/Vienna, Austria
Jun 2, 2007	Ironman 70.3 Hawaii^{†}	(United States) Kohala, Hawaii
Jun 3, 2007	Ironman 70.3 Switzerland	Rapperswil-Jona, Lake Zurich, Switzerland
Jun 10, 2007	Ironman 70.3 Eagleman^{†}	(United States) Cambridge, Maryland
Jun 10, 2007	Ironman 70.3 Baja	(Mexico) Ensenada, Baja California
Jun 17, 2007	Ironman 70.3 U.K.	(United Kingdom) Wimbleball, Exmoor
Jun 24, 2007	Ironman 70.3 Buffalo Springs Lake^{†}	(United States) Lubbock, Texas
Jul 8, 2007	North Ironman 70.3	(United States) Lake Stevens, Washington
Jul 22, 2012	Ironman 70.3 Vineman^{†}	(United States) Sonoma County, California
Jul 29, 2007	Ironman 70.3 Newfoundland	(Canada) Corner Brook, Newfoundland and Labrador
Aug 4, 2007	Ironman 70.3 Steelhead	(United States) Benton Harbor, Michigan
Aug 5, 2007	Ironman 70.3 Antwerp	Antwerp, Belgium
Aug 19, 2007	Ironman 70.3 Germany^{†}	Wiesbaden, Germany
Aug 19, 2007	Ironman 70.3 Timberman	(United States) Gilford, New Hampshire
Sep 2, 2007	Ironman 70.3 Singapore	Singapore
Sep 2, 2007	Ironman 70.3 Monaco^{†}	Monaco
Sep 16, 2007	Ironman 70.3 Brazil	Brasília, Brazil
Sep 23, 2007	Ironman 70.3 Cancún	Cancún, Mexico

^{†}Also served as a 2007 Ironman World Championship qualifier.

=== 2007 Ironman 70.3 Series results ===
==== Men ====
Event	Gold	Time	Silver	Time	Bronze	Time	Reference
Australia	Torbjørn Sindballe (DEN)	4:03:31	Jason Shortis (AUS)	4:05:23	Joshua Rix (AUS)	4:06:45	
Clearwater	Craig Alexander (AUS)	3:45:37	Simon Lessing (GBR)	3:47:25	Richie Cunningham (AUS)	3:49:17	
California	Andy Potts (USA)	3:59:59	Jens Koefoed (DEN)	4:03:43	Elliot Lewis (USA)	4:03:53	
St. Croix	Craig Alexander (AUS)	4:04:52	Richie Cunningham (AUS)	4:08:56	Chris McCormack (AUS)	4:09:51	
Florida	Craig Alexander (AUS)	3:50:27	Simon Lessing (GBR)	3:53:47	Luke Bell (AUS)	3:54:18	
Austria	Michael Göhner (GER)	3:54:49	Gerrit Schellens (BEL)	4:00:05	Hans Mühlbauer (GER)	4:00:13	
Hawaii	Chris McCormack (AUS)	3:57:18	Patrick Vernay (NCL)	4:01:59	Timothy Marr (USA)	4:11:08	
Switzerland	Ronnie Schildknecht (SUI)	3:46:39	Christoph Mauch (SUI)	3:51:23	Jimmy Johnsen (DEN)	3:52:16	
Eagleman	T. J. Tollakson (USA)	3:46:28	Richie Cunningham (AUS)	3:52:48	Viktor Zyemtsev (UKR)	3:54:06	
Baja	Chris McCormack (AUS)	3:53:53	Craig Walton (AUS)	3:54:38	Luke McKenzie (AUS)	3:58:43	
UK	Fraser Cartmell (GBR)	4:24:32	James Gilfillan (GBR)	4:26:12	Paul Ambrose (AUS)	4:26:36	
Buffalo Springs	Chris Leigh (USA)	3:55:03	Paul Matthews (AUS)	3:57:53	Tim DeBoom (USA)	3:58:24	
Lake Stevens	Chris Leigh (USA)	3:56:26	Paul Matthews (AUS)	3:57:08	Luke Mckenzie (USA)	3:5733	
Vineman	Craig Alexander (AUS)	3:50:49	Luke Bell (AUS)	3:51:01	T. J. Tollakson (USA)	3:53:02	
Newfoundland	Craig Alexander (AUS)	3:58:26	Richie Cunningham (AUS)	3:58:54	Marcel Vifian (USA)	4:03:38	
Steelhead	Guembel Wolfgang (CAN)	4:04:42	Jason Glowney (USA)	4:13:59	Eric Fernando (USA)	4:14:55	
Antwerp	Marino Vanhoenacker (BEL)	3:50:06	Andrew Johns (SUI)	3:57:29	Stijn Demeulemeester (BEL)	4:00:29	
Germany	Stéphan Bignet (FRA)	4:06:53	Alessandro Degasperi (ITA)	4:11:04	Nils Goerke (GER)	4:13:59	
Timberman	Simon Lessing (GBR)	4:00:00	Björn Andersson (SWE)	4:02:52	Michael Lovato (USA)	4:05:59	
Singapore	Reinaldo Colucci (BRA)	3:49:59	Ronnie Schildknecht (SUI)	3:50:39	Stephen Bayliss (GBR)	3:54:37	
Monaco	Marcel Zamora Pérez (ESP)	4:14:14	Paul Amey (GBR)	4:16:06	Nicolas Lebrun (FRA)	4:16:32	
Brazil	Paulo Miyasiro (BRA)	4:06:34	Santiago Ascenço (BRA)	4:09:07	Henrique Siqueira (BRA)	4:09:53	
Cancún	Oscar Galíndez (ARG)	3:49:10	David Thompson (USA)	3:51:19	Luke McKenzie (AUS)	3:51:49	

==== Women ====
Event	Gold	Time	Silver	Time	Bronze	Time	Reference
Australia	Belinda Granger (AUS)	4:35:55	Lisa Marangon (AUS)	4:36:26	Angela Sharp (AUS)	4:40:00	
Clearwater	Samantha McGlone (CAN)	4:12:58	Lisa Bentley (CAN)	4:14:30	Mirinda Carfrae (AUS)	4:16:44	
California	Kate Major (AUS)	4:26:15	Dede Griesbauer (USA)	4:31:46	Becky Lavelle (USA)	4:33:03	
St. Croix	Julie Dibens (GBR)	4:29:11	Catriona Morrison (GBR)	4:33:09	Samantha McGlone (CAN)	4:39:52	
Florida	Katja Schumacher (GER)	4:28:28	Karen Smyers (USA)	4:34:06	Tine Deckers (BEL)	4:36:31	
Austria	Erika Csomor (HUN)	4:24:39	Charlotte Kolters (DEN)	4:28:00	Edith Niederfriniger (ITA)	4:31:26	
Hawaii	Samantha McGlone (CAN)	4:31:42	Michellie Jones (AUS)	4:33:08	Bree Wee (USA)	4:47:08	
Switzerland	Nicola Spirig (SUI)	4:15:33	Cornelia Elmer (SUI)	4:18:12	Karin Thürig (SUI)	4:19:57	
Eagleman	Karen Laface (USA)	4:06:53	Natascha Badmann (SUI)	4:08:17	Mirinda Carfrae (AUS)	4:13:18	
Baja	Linsey Corbin (USA)	4:32:35	Justine Whipple (USA)	4:34:12	Lara Brown (USA)	4:43:50	
UK	Julie Dibens (GBR)	4:49:28	Katja Schumacher (GER)	4:57:09	Michelle Lee (GBR)	4:59:23	
Buffalo Springs	Natascha Badmann (SUI)	4:19:07	Mirinda Carfrae (AUS)	4:20:10	Rebekah Keat (AUS)	4:28:08	
Lake Stevens	Rebekah Keat (AUS)	4:28:05	Melissa Ashton (AUS)	4:31:11	Heather Gollnick (USA)	4:34:02	
Vineman	Samantha McGlone (CAN)	4:16:36	Michellie Jones (AUS)	4:21:29	Melissa Ashton (AUS)	4:24:12	
Newfoundland	Melissa Ashton (AUS)	4:32:22	Magali Tisseyre (CAN)	4:39:50	Nicole Guembel (CAN)	4:51:30	
Steelhead	Andrea Fisher (USA)	4:35:05	Tara Norton (CAN)	4:40:24	Elizabeth Fedofsky (USA)	4:40:54	
Antwerp	Rebecca Preston (AUS)	4:19:14	Yvonne van Vlerken (NED)	4:21:28	Cora Vlot (NED)	4:29:34	
Germany	Virginia Berasategui (ESP)	4:44:29	Wenke Kujala (GER)	4:47:27	Andrea Brede (GER)	4:48:54	
Timberman	Desiree Ficker (USA)	4:25:54	Kate Major (AUS)	4:28:48	Dede Griesbauer (USA)	4:41:11	
Singapore	Belinda Granger (AUS)	4:11:23	Mirinda Carfrae (AUS)	4:17:17	Chrissie Wellington (GBR)	4:19:18	
Monaco	Alexandra Louison (FRA)	4:49:43	Sibylle Matter (SUI)	4:51:30	Christel Robin (FRA)	4:52:46	
Brazil	Carla Moreno (BRA)	4:38:13	Fernanda Keller (BRA)	4:42:50	Ana Lídia Borba (BRA)	4:48:56	
Cancún	Tyler Stewart (USA)	4:26:37	Abigail Bayley (GBR)	4:33:51	Laura Tingle (USA)	4:40:23	
