= Luke McKenzie (triathlete) =

Australian professional triathlete (born 1981)

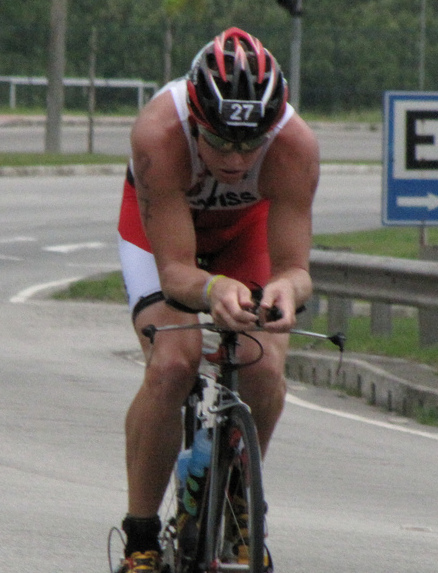
- McKenzie at Ironman Brazil in 2010

Personal information
- Born: 26 July 1981 (age 44) Taree, New South Wales
- Height: 1.8 m (5 ft 11 in)
- Weight: 73 kg (161 lb)

Sport
- Country: Australia
- Turned pro: 2003
- Coached by: Self-coached
Medal record
Representing Australia
Triathlon
Ironman World Championship
Silver medal – second place	2013	Individual

Luke Jarrod McKenzie (born 26 July 1981) is an Australian professional triathlete who specializes in long distance, non-drafting triathlon events. In 2013 he took second place at the Ironman World Championship.

== Career ==
McKenzie was born and raised in Taree, New South Wales where he grew up participating in a variety of sports including cricket, water polo, and golf. His first introduction and interest in triathlon came from volunteering at a marathon aid station in Forster during Ironman Australia with his family for a few years of his childhood in the late 1980s. At age 13, his family moved to the Gold Coast which exposed to him to a higher caliber triathlon, swimming, and surfing environment. His talent as a swimmer was good enough to warrant training with an Olympic coach. Swimming also led to surf lifesaving competitions and cross country running. There was a triathlon club that trained at the same time and at the same pool where he swam. McKenzie approached the team coach and asked to join their squad and was accepted. In the very first race he entered, a junior sprint; which lasted 15 minutes, he took first place.

McKenzie was picked to train at Australia's newly created national triathlon performance center. Throughout high school he trained alongside future champions Mirinda Carfrae, Emma Snowsill, and Annabel Luxford. In 1997, he reached his first world junior championships in duathlon and at 19 he placed third at the 2001 ITU World Junior Championships. The following year, with the Athens Olympic Games two years away, McKenzie was unsure his current pursuit of draft-legal, Olympic style racing was going to result in him qualifying the games. Under the advisement of training partner Michellie Jones, he and Craig Alexander moved into an apartment in Carlsbad, California and trained, focusing on non-draft style racing.

In his career leading up to the 2013 Ironman World Championship, McKenzie had won six previous Ironman competitions. He led the 2013 championship race up until mile 16 of the marathon before being passed by eventual champion Frederik Van Lierde but held on to finish second.

== Personal life ==
McKenzie was married to pro triathlete Amanda Balding from October 2010 to March 2013. Pro triathlete, Beth Gerdes gave birth to their daughter, Wynne, in May 2014. Luke and Beth have subsequently been married.

== Notable results ==
McKenzie's notable race results include:

Results list

Year	Event	Place
2019	Ironman 70.3 Philippines	11th
2019	Ironman 70.3 Vietnam	DNF
2019	Challenge Melbourne	5th
2019	Ironman 70.3 Taiwan	3rd
2018	Ironman Western Australia	4th
2018	Challenge Asia-Pacific Championship	1st
2018	Ironman Australia	2nd
2018	Challenge Wanaka	6th
2017	Ironman 70.3 Los Cabos	10th
2017	Ironman Wisconsin	1st
2017	Ironman 70.3 Raleigh	22nd
2016	Ironman World Championship	37th
2016	Ironman Cairns	6th
2016	Ironman 70.3 Vietnam	3rd
2016	Ironman 70.3 Panama	16th
2016	Ironman Western Australia	1st
2015	Challenge Laguna Phuket	DNF
2015	Ironman 70.3 Pucón	4th
2015	Challenge Dubai	18th
2015	Ironman 70.3 Subic Bay	4th
2015	Ironman 70.3 St. George	8th
2015	Ironman Cairns	1st
2015	Ironman 70.3 Cebu	6th
2015	Ironman 70.3 Sunshine Coast	2nd
2015	Ironman World Championship	DNF
2015	Island House Invitational Triathlon	7th
2015	Ironman Western Australia	1st
2014	Ironman World Championship	15th
2014	Challenge Roth	10th
2014	Ironman Melbourne	13th
2013	Ironman World Championship	2nd
2013	Ironman 70.3 World Championship	50th
2013	Hy-Vee 5150 Championships	19th
2013	Philippines 5150	1st
2013	Ironman Cairns	1st
2013	Coral Coast 5150	4th
2013	Ironman 70.3 St. George	8th
2013	Ironman 70.3 Oceanside	9th
2013	Ironman 70.3 Pucón	7th
2012	Ironman Cozumel	11th
2012	Ironman World Championship	24th
2012	Ironman 70.3 Cozumel	4th
2012	Ironman 70.3 Vinenam	8th
2012	Ironman 70.3 Cairns	2nd
2012	Ironman 70.3 Busselton	4th
2011	Ironman World Championship	9th
2011	Ironman 70.3 World Championship	32nd
2011	Ironman Germany	6th
2011	Ironman Texas	13th
2011	Ironman 70.3 New Orleans	13th
2011	Ironman 70.3 San Juan	3rd
2010	Ironman 70.3 Cancún	2nd
2010	Ironman 70.3 Lake Stevens	5th
2010	Ironman Brazil	1st
2010	Ironman 70.3 Busselton	1st
2010	Ironman China	1st
2009	Ironman World Championship	15th
2009	Ironman Malaysia	1st
2009	Ironman Japan	1st
2009	Ironman Louisville	2nd
2009	Ironman Florida	7th
2009	Ironman 70.3 Western Australia	1st
2009	Ironman 70.3 China	2nd
2009	Ironman 70.3 Hawaii	3rd
2008	Ironman World Championship	29th
2008	Ironman 70.3 World Championship	7th
2008	Ironman Japan	1st
2008	Ironman Western Australia	3rd
2008	Ironman Australia	5th
2008	Ironman 70.3 Singapore	5th
2008	Malibu Triathlon	11th
2008	Wildflower Triathlon	16th
2007	Ironman World Championship	19th
2007	Ironman 70.3 Cancún	3rd
2007	Ironman 70.3 Baja	3rd
2007	Ironman 70.3 Lake Stevens	3rd
2007	Ironman 70.3 Antwerp	5th
2007	Ironman Coeur d’Alene	6th
2006	Ironman World Championship	54th
2006	Ironman Lake Placid	10th
2006	Ironman 70.3 St. Croix	7th
2006	Ironman 70.3 Florida	4th
2005	Port Macquarie Half Ironman	4th
2005	Ironman 70.3 Eagleman	6th
2005	Ironman 70.3 Florida	7th
2005	St. Croix Triathlon	5th
2005	St. Anthony's Triathlon	9th
2004	Ironman Western Australia	3rd
2004	Wisconsin Half Ironman Racine	2nd
2004	Musoka Challenge	4th
2004	St. Anthony's Triathlon	7th
2004	Escape From Alcatraz	12th
2004	Noosa Triathlon	15th
2003	Ironman 70.3 Racine	1st
2003	Pacific Coast ITU Triathlon Pan American Cup	9th
2003	Noosa Triathlon	10th
2003	ITU Triathlon World Championships U/23 Championships	9th
