= 2008 Ironman World Championship =

32nd edition of the Ironman Triathlon World Championship

The 2008 Ford Ironman World Championship was held on October 11, 2008, in Kailua-Kona, Hawaii. It was the 32nd such Ironman Triathlon World Championship, which has been held annually in Hawaii since 1978. The champions were Craig Alexander and Chrissie Wellington. The championship was organised by the World Triathlon Corporation (WTC).

== Medallists ==
=== Men ===
| Pos. | Time (h:mm:ss) | Name | Country | Split times (h:mm:ss) | | | | |
| Pos. | Time (h:mm:ss) | Name | Country | Swim | T1 | Bike | T2 | Run |
|---|---|---|---|---|---|---|---|---|
| Gold medal | 8:17:45 | Craig Alexander | Australia | 51:43 | 1:41 | 4:37:19 | 2:04 | 2:45:01 |
| Silver medal | 8:20:50 | Eneko Llanos | Spain | 51:39 | 1:48 | 4:33:27 | 2:10 | 2:51:49 |
| Bronze medal | 8:21:23 | Rutger Beke | Belgium | 54:44 | 1:50 | 4:34:45 | 2:16 | 2:47:49 |
| 4 | 8:21:46 | Ronnie Schildknecht | Switzerland | 54:56 | 1:58 | 4:34:26 | 2:08 | 2:48:20 |
| 5 | 8:26:17 | Cameron Brown | New Zealand | 51:50 | 2:04 | 4:36:47 | 1:59 | 2:53:39 |
| 6 | 8:30:23 | Patrick Vernay | New Caledonia | 51:58 | 1:52 | 4:42:49 | 2:06 | 2:51:40 |
| 7 | 8:33:50 | Andy Potts | United States | 48:40 | 1:48 | 4:46:00 | 2:51 | 2:54:31 |
| 8 | 8:34:02 | Mathias Hecht | Switzerland | 51:42 | 1:46 | 4:36:55 | 2:28 | 3:01:13 |
| 9 | 8:34:47 | Michael Lovato | United States | 52:58 | 1:52 | 4:45:21 | 2:27 | 2:52:12 |
| 10 | 8:36:53 | Eduardo Sturla | Argentina | 54:47 | 2:02 | 4:34:27 | 2:20 | 3:03:19 |

=== Women ===
| Pos. | Time (h:mm:ss) | Name | Country | Split times (h:mm:ss) | | | | |
| Pos. | Time (h:mm:ss) | Name | Country | Swim | T1 | Bike | T2 | Run |
|---|---|---|---|---|---|---|---|---|
| Gold medal | 9:06:23 | Chrissie Wellington | Great Britain | 56:20 | 2:06 | 5:08:16 | 1:59 | 2:57:44 |
| Silver medal | 9:21:20 | Yvonne van Vlerken | Netherlands | 1:06:49 | 1:50 | 5:05:34 | 2:42 | 3:04:27 |
| Bronze medal | 9:22:52 | Sandra Wallenhorst | Germany | 1:03:21 | 2:33 | 5:14:57 | 3:28 | 2:58:36 |
| 4 | 9:24:49 | Erika Csomor | Hungary | 59:09 | 2:19 | 5:18:12 | 2:06 | 3:03:05 |
| 5 | 9:28:51 | Linsey Corbin | United States | 1:00:35 | 2:22 | 5:14:33 | 2:07 | 3:09:16 |
| 6 | 9:29:15 | Virginia Berasategui | Spain | 58:50 | 2:10 | 5:22:17 | 2:12 | 3:03:48 |
| 7 | 9:34:08 | Bella Comerford | Great Britain | 59:02 | 2:27 | 5:21:46 | 2:25 | 3:08:31 |
| 8 | 9:36:53 | Gina Ferguson | New Zealand | 54:45 | 2:15 | 5:26:29 | 2:07 | 3:11:19 |
| 9 | 9:37:06 | Gina Kehr | United States | 54:45 | 2:00 | 5:21:46 | 4:02 | 3:14:36 |
| 10 | 9:39:53 | Dede Griesbauer | United States | 54:52 | 2:06 | 5:20:52 | 2:48 | 3:19:17 |

The championship race had a total of 1,731 athletes competing (1,256 men and 475 women) from 51 countries started the race with 1,634 finished, 94 did not finish and 3 were disqualified. A maximum temperature of 81.6 °F (27.6 °C) made for warm racing conditions with wind gusts reaching 13.0 mph (20.9 km/h).

== Qualification ==
To enter for the 2008 World Championship race, athletes were required to qualify through performance at an Ironman or selected Ironman 70.3 race, through Hawaii residency, through a random allocation lottery, or by invitation from the WTC.

The Ironman 2008 Series consisted of 21 Ironman qualifying races plus the Ironman World Championship 2008 which was itself a qualifier for the 2009 Ironman World Championship. The series started with Ironman Wisconsin 2007 held on September 9, 2007, and in total 1,800 athletes qualified for the World Championship race.

=== Qualifying Ironmans ===
| Date | Event | Location |
|---|---|---|
| Sep 9, 2007 | Ford Ironman Wisconsin | Madison, Wisconsin, United States |
| Oct 13, 2007 | Ford Ironman World Championship | Kailua-Kona, Hawaii, United States |
| Nov 3, 2007 | Ford Ironman Florida | Panama City Beach, Florida, United States |
| Dec 2, 2007 | Ironman Western Australia | Busselton, Western Australia, Australia |
| Feb 23, 2008 | Ironman Malaysia | Langkawi, Malaysia |
| Mar 1, 2008 | Ironman New Zealand | Taupō, New Zealand |
| Apr 6, 2008 | Ironman Australia | Port Macquarie, New South Wales, Australia |
| Apr 13, 2008 | Ironman South Africa | Nelson Mandela Bay, South Africa |
| Apr 13, 2008 | Ford Ironman Arizona | Tempe, Arizona, United States |
| Apr 20, 2008 | Ironman China | Hainan Island, China |
| May 24, 2008 | Ironman Lanzarote | Puerto del Carmen, Lanzarote, Spain |
| May 25, 2008 | Ironman Brazil | Florianópolis Island, Brazil |
| Jun 22, 2008 | Ironman France | Nice, France |
| Jun 22, 2008 | Ford Ironman Coeur d'Alene | Coeur d'Alene, Idaho, United States |
| Jul 6, 2008 | Ironman Germany | Frankfurt, Germany |
| Jul 13, 2008 | Ironman Austria | Klagenfurt, Austria |
| Jul 13, 2008 | Ironman Switzerland | Zürich, Switzerland |
| Jul 20, 2008 | Ironman Lake Placid | Lake Placid, New York, United States |
| Aug 24, 2008 | Ironman Canada | Penticton, British Columbia, Canada |
| Aug 31, 2008 | Ironman Louisville | Louisville, Kentucky, United States |
| Sep 7, 2008 | Ironman UK | Sherborne, Dorset, United Kingdom |

There were 33,769 recorded Ironman finishing times during the 2008 series, with the fastest time of 7:59:55 set by Chris McCormack in the Ironman European Championship 2008.

=== 2008 Ironman Series results ===
==== Men ====
| Event | Gold | Time | Silver | Time | Bronze | Time | Reference |
|---|---|---|---|---|---|---|---|
| Wisconsin | Maik Twelsiek (GER) | 8:52:49 | Paul Fritzsche (USA) | 9:03:22 | Uzziel Valderrabano (MEX) | 9:06:05 | |
| World Champs 07 | Chris McCormack (AUS) | 8:15:34 | Craig Alexander (AUS) | 8:19:04 | Torbjørn Sindballe (DEN) | 8:21:30 | |
| Florida | Stephan Vuckovic (GER) | 8:21:29 | Sergio Marques (POR) | 8:23:49 | Bryan Rhodes (NZL) | 8:26:52 | |
| Western Australia | Patrick Vernay (NCL) | 8:06:00 | Raynard Tissink (RSA) | 8:09:20 | Mitchell Anderson (AUS) | 8:12:20 | |
| Malaysia | Faris Al-Sultan (GER) | 8:34:42 | Petr Vabrousek (CZE) | 9:04:54 | Elmar Schuberth (AUT) | 9:06:03 | |
| New Zealand | Cameron Brown (NZL) | 8:24:49 | Frederik Van Lierde (BEL) | 8:31:35 | Kieran Doe (NZL) | 8:33:35 | |
| Australia | Patrick Vernay (NCL) | 8:31:33 | Mitchell Anderson (AUS) | 8:40:19 | Mathias Hecht (SUI) | 8:42:48 | |
| South Africa | Stephen Bayliss (GBR) | 8:18:23 | Raynard Tissink (RSA) | 8:23:09 | Peter Schoissengeier (AUT) | 8:33:24 | |
| Arizona | Jozsef Major (HUN) | 8:34:19 | T. J. Tollakson (USA) | 8:34:36 | Jordan Rapp (USA) | 8:35:04 | |
| China | Olaf Sabatschus (GER) | 8:52:14 | Byung Hoon Park (KOR) | 9:13:15 | Timothy Marr (USA) | 9:14:17 | |
| Lanzarote | Bert Jammaer (BEL) | 8:59:37 | Teemu Toivanen (FIN) | 9:08:15 | Ain-Alar Juhanson (EST) | 9:08:36 | |
| Brazil | Eduardo Sturla (ARG) | 8:28:24 | Olaf Sabatschus (GER) | 8:38:56 | Sanson Benjamin (FRA) | 8:41:32 | |
| France | Marcel Zamora Perez (ESP) | 8:34:18 | Hervé Faure (FRA) | 8:41:55 | Patrick Bringer (FRA) | 8:45:15 | |
| Coeur d'Alene | Tom Evans (CAN) | 8:34:22 | Victor Zyemtsev (USA) | 8:43:56 | Michael Lovato (USA) | 8:48:22 | |
| Germany | Chris McCormack (AUS) | 7:59:55 | Eneko Llanos (ESP) | 8:00:49 | Timo Bracht (GER) | 8:04:16 | |
| Austria | Marino Vanhoenacker (BEL) | 8:06:11 | Stephen Bayliss (GBR) | 8:13:53 | Hannes Hempel (AUT) | 8:16:56 | |
| Switzerland | Ronnie Schildknecht (SUI) | 8:16:05 | Stefan Reisen (SUI) | 8:32:10 | Frank Vytrisal (GER) | 8:40:53 | |
| Lake Placid | Francisco Pontano (ESP) | 8:43:32 | Petr Vabrousek (CZE) | 8:55:20 | Mathias Hecht (SUI) | 8:56:33 | |
| Canada | Bryan Rhodes (NZL) | 8:30:12 | Bernard Hiebl (AUT) | 8:34:34 | Jasper Blake (CAN) | 8:36:08 | |
| Louisville | Maximilian Longree (GER) | 8:33:58 | Chris McDonald (AUS) | 8:54:52 | Sergio Marques (POR) | 8:59:15 | |
| UK | Stephen Bayliss (GBR) | 8:53:58 | Scott Neyedli (GBR) | 9:04:29 | Andreas di Bernardo (AUT) | 9:08:24 | |

==== Women ====
| Event | Gold | Time | Silver | Time | Bronze | Time | Reference |
|---|---|---|---|---|---|---|---|
| Wisconsin | Gina Ferguson (NZL) | 9:37:03 | Hilary Biscay (USA) | 10:01:30 | Ina Reinders (GER) | 10:03:39 | |
| World Champs 07 | Chrissie Wellington (GBR) | 9:08:45 | Samantha McGlone (USA) | 9:14:04 | Kate Major (USA) | 9:19:13 | |
| Florida | Nina Kraft (GER) | 9:05:35 | Heleen bij de Vaate (NED) | 9:07:40 | Tyler Stewart (USA) | 9:09:18 | |
| Western Australia | Charlotte Paul (AUS) | 9:00:55 | Gina Ferguson (NZL) | 9:08:23 | Bella Comerford (GBR) | 9:14:25 | |
| Malaysia | Belinda Granger (AUS) | 9:29:21 | Yvonne van Vlerken (NED) | 9:35:46 | Yasuko Miyazaki (JPN) | 10:14:01 | |
| New Zealand | Joanna Lawn (NZL) | 9:16:00 | Kate Bevilaqua (AUS) | 9:20:06 | Emi Shiono (JPN) | 9:23:26 | |
| Australia | Chrissie Wellington (GBR) | 9:03:55 | Kate Major (USA) | 9:09:12 | Prue Oswin (AUS) | 10:00:11 | |
| South Africa | Bella Comerford (GBR) | 9:27:48 | Edith Niederfriniger (ITA) | 9:27:53 | Lucie Zelenková (CZE) | 9:34:09 | |
| Arizona | Erika Csomor (HUN) | 9:14:49 | Michellie Jones (USA) | 9:25:52 | Heather Gollnick (USA) | 9:32:07 | |
| China | Belinda Granger (AUS) | 10:08:37 | Donna Phelan (CAN) | 10:37:11 | Abigail Bayley (GBR) | 10:43:11 | |
| Lanzarote | Bella Comerford (GBR) | 10:02:27 | Heleen bij de Vaate (NED) | 10:12:07 | Tara Norton (CAN) | 10:13:16 | |
| Brazil | Fernanda Keller (BRA) | 9:42:50 | Hillary Biscay (USA) | 9:56:08 | Ladislava Cisarovska (CZE) | 10:06:10 | |
| France | Martina Dogana (ITA) | 9:35:29 | Katja Schumacher (GER) | 10:00:59 | Alexandra Louison (FRA) | 10:03:46 | |
| Coeur d'Alene | Heather Wurtele (CAN) | 9:38:58 | Heather Gollnick (USA) | 9:50:34 | Tiina Boman (FIN) | 9:55:28 | |
| Germany | Chrissie Wellington (GBR) | 8:51:24 | Nicole Leder (GER) | 9:17:26 | Wenke Kujala (GER) | 9:24:54 | |
| Austria | Sandra Wallenhorst (GER) | 8:47:26 | Bella Comerford (GBR) | 8:51:17 | Edith Niederfriniger (ITA) | 8:59:45 | |
| Switzerland | Sibylle Matter (SUI) | 9:30:12 | Kathrin Pätzold (GER) | 9:35:05 | Caroline Steffen (SUI) | 9:37:24 | |
| Lake Placid | Caitlin Shea-Kenney (USA) | 9:51:00 | Kim Loeffler (USA) | 9:54:55 | Hillary Biscay (USA) | 9:58:45 | |
| Canada | Belinda Granger (AUS) | 9:17:58 | Alison Fitch (AUS) | 9:26:15 | Heather Wurtele (CAN) | 9:39:51 | |
| Louisville | Mariska Kramer-Postma (NED) | 9:54:17 | Heather Gollnick (USA) | 9:56:53 | Lisbeth Kristensen (DEN) | 9:58:33 | |
| UK | Bella Comerford (GBR) | 9:49:06 | Heike Funk (GER) | 10:24:40 | Susanne Buckenlei (GER) | 10:28:41 | |
