= Katja Schumacher =

German triathlete

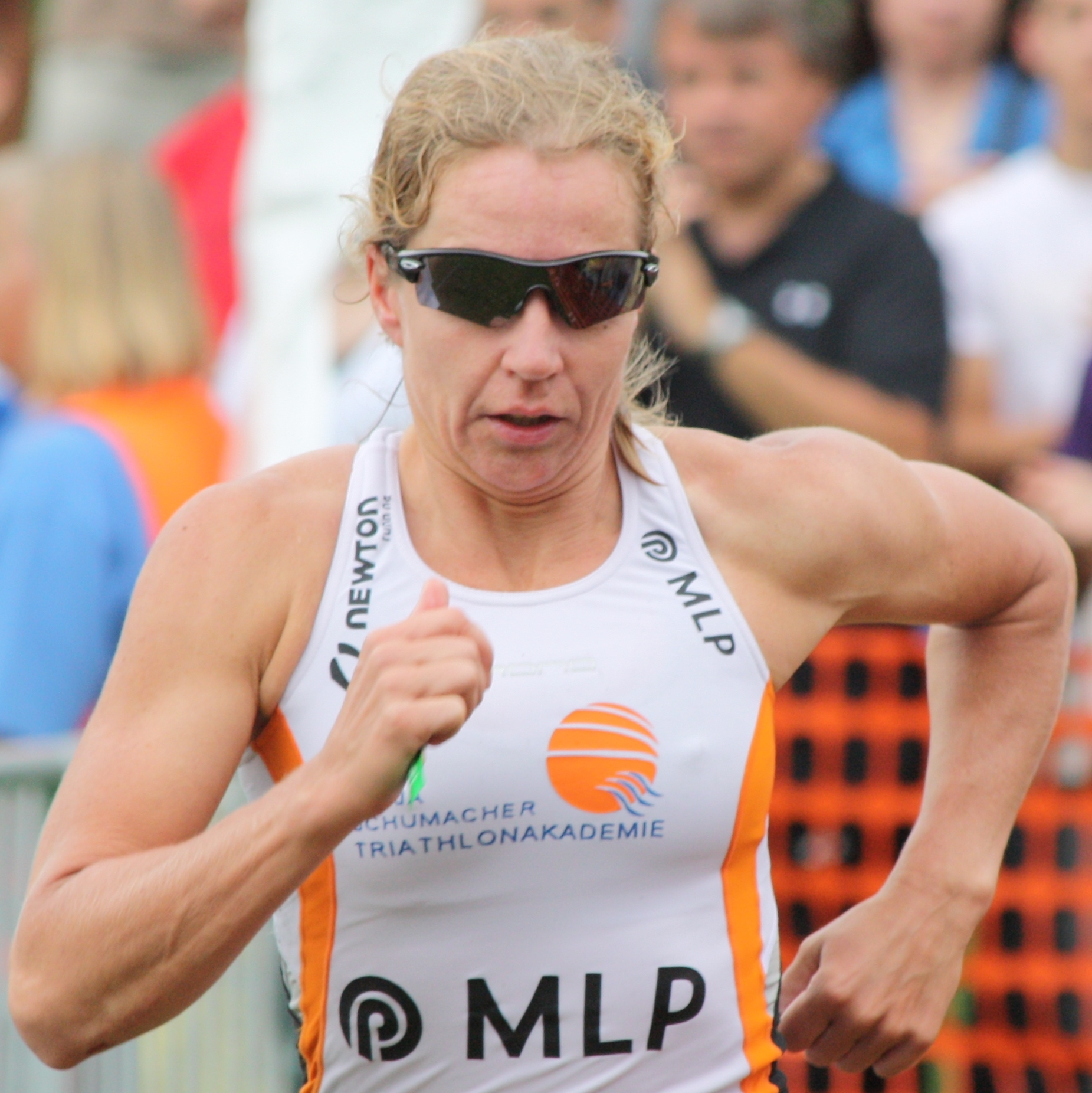
Katja Schumacher on the short distance at the 2009 HeidelbergMan triathlon in Heidelberg

Katja Schumacher (* 9 April 1968 in Heidelberg) is a German triathlete and Ironman triathlete, and previous German champion in both of these disciplines.

== Career ==
Katja Schumacher grew up in Heidelberg. Her uncle was the Austrian alpine ski racer Toni Sailer.

After the 2004 Frankfurt Ironman race, Schumacher was banned for one year by the disciplinary committee of the Triathlon Union (DTU). Schumacher fought back against the positive A- und B-tests, and denied ever having taken illegal performance-enhancing drugs. Due to the uncertainty of the case, the ban was lifted after 10 months, and the disciplinary commission decided that the case should not be referred to as a "ban".

After this case, Schumacher quickly returned to competition, and after some years in the US, returned to live in Heidelberg. In 2005 and 2008 she won the German middle-distance Triathlon championship (2 km swimming, 85 km cycling and 20 km running). Besides these races, she won four long-distance Ironman triathlons (in 1998, 2001, 2002 and 2006) and two 70.3 Ironman races (2002 and 2007). She retired from active competition in 2009, and acts as a coach and trainer, and gives seminars.

== Sporting successes ==
Triathlon Kurz- und Mitteldistanz
Datum/Jahr	Rang	Wettbewerb	Austragungsort	Zeit	Bemerkung
August 3, 2009	2	HeidelbergMan	Germany Heidelberg	02:29:52	Second place over the short distance (1,7 km swimming, 36 km cycling and 10 km running) behind Nina Kuhn
2009	2	Viernheimer V-Card Triathlon	Germany Viernheim	02:41:24	Taking second place behind Daniela Sämmler, Schumacher achieved her fifth victory in the BASF Triathlon-Cup Rhein-Neckar series.
June 7, 2009	1	Mußbach Triathlon	Germany Mußbach	02:21:24	
May 24, 2009	2	Half Challenge Barcelona	Spain Barcelona	04:22:46	The post-race disqualification of winner Virginia Berasategui was later rescinded.
July 27, 2008	2	HeidelbergMan	Germany Heidelberg	02:24:53	After Tina Tremmel in the Baden-Württemberg championship
2008	1	DTU Deutsche Triathlon-Meisterschaft Mitteldistanz	Germany Kulmbach	04:23:33	German champion at the Mönchshof Triathlon
August 5, 2007	1	HeidelbergMan	Germany Heidelberg	02:24:47	Winner; Kathrin Pätzold took second place.
August 2007	1	BASF Triathlon-Cup Rhein-Neckar	Germany Viernheim		Winner over the Olympic distance
July 21, 2007	1	Ladenburger RömerMan	Germany Ladenburg	02:19:36	Winner in front of Heidi Jesberger und Nina Kuhn
2007	1	Ironman 70.3 Florida	United States Orlando		
August 2006	1	BASF Triathlon-Cup Rhein-Neckar	Germany Viernheim		Winner over the Olympic distance
July 29, 2006	1	Ladenburger RömerMan	Germany Ladenburg	02:23:27	
August 6, 2006	1	HeidelbergMan	Germany Heidelberg	02:26:30	
2006	2	Mönchshof-Triathlon	Germany Kulmbach	04:44:14	
August 7, 2005	1	HeidelbergMan	Germany Heidelberg	02:19:01	Winner in front of Ute Schäfer
2005	1	DTU Deutsche Triathlon-Meisterschaft Mitteldistanz	Germany Kulmbach	04:46:28	German champion at Mönchshof Triathlon
August 1, 2004	2	HeidelbergMan	Germany Heidelberg	02:22:45	Second behind Ricarda Lisk
August 10, 2003	2	HeidelbergMan	Germany Heidelberg	02:27:39	Second behind Fiona Docherty
2003	1	Bad Emser Therme-Triathlon	Germany Bad Ems	02:33:49	Win over the short distance
May 4, 2002	1	Wildflower Triathlon	United States		First place at Lake San Antonio (Calif.) (1,9 km swimming, 90 km cycling, 21,1 km running)
June 29, 2002	4	Alpen-Triathlon	Germany Schliersee	02:26:40	
2001	1	Ironman 70.3 California	United States Oceanside	04:16	New course record
August 1998	1	BASF Triathlon-Cup Rhein-Neckar	Germany Viernheim		Winner over the Olympic distance
1998	1	HeidelbergMan	Germany Heidelberg		
August 1997	1	BASF Triathlon-Cup Rhein-Neckar	Germany Viernheim		Winner over the Olympic distance
June 22, 1997	1	HeidelbergMan	Germany Heidelberg	02:23:42	
August 1996	1	BASF Triathlon-Cup Rhein-Neckar	Germany Viernheim		Winner over the Olympic distance
1996	2	HeidelbergMan	Germany Heidelberg		
August 1995	1	BASF Triathlon-Cup Rhein-Neckar	Germany Viernheim		Winner over the Olympic distance
1992	2	Heidelberger Triathlon	Germany Heidelberg		
1990	2	Heidelberger Triathlon	Germany Heidelberg		

Triathlon Langdistanz
Datum/Jahr	Rang	Wettbewerb	Austragungsort	Zeit	Bemerkung
June 21, 2009	999–	Ironman Coeur d’Alene	United States Idaho	DNF	Came out of the water in fifth place among the women, but did not complete the race.
June 22, 2008	2	Ironman France	France Nice	10:00:59	
2007	6	Ironman Florida	United States Panama City	09:22:21	
2007	3	Ironman Arizona	United States Tempe		
2006	1	Ironman Wisconsin	United States Madison		
October 15, 2005	6	Ironman Hawaii	United States Big Island		
August 22, 2005	2	Ironman UK	United Kingdom Bolton	10:05:20	
October 18, 2003	15	Ironman Hawaii	United States Big Island	09:56:03	
2002	1	Ironman Germany	Germany Frankfurt am Main		
2001	3	Ironman South Africa	South Africa Port Elizabeth	09:59:42	Behind winner Nina Kraft
November 10, 2001	1	Ironman Florida	United States Panama City	09:25:57	New track record in Florida.
1998	1	Ironman Europe	Germany Roth	09:27:43	
1997	2	Ironman Europe	Germany Roth		
1997	3	Ironman Europe	Germany Roth		
1996	2	Ironman Lanzarote	Spain Playa del Carmen		
1995	3	Ironman Lanzarote	Spain Playa del Carmen		First start as Triathlon Pro
1992		Ironman Europe	Germany Roth		Winner in age group 18–25

(DNF – Did Not Finish)
