= Mirinda Carfrae =

Australian triathlete

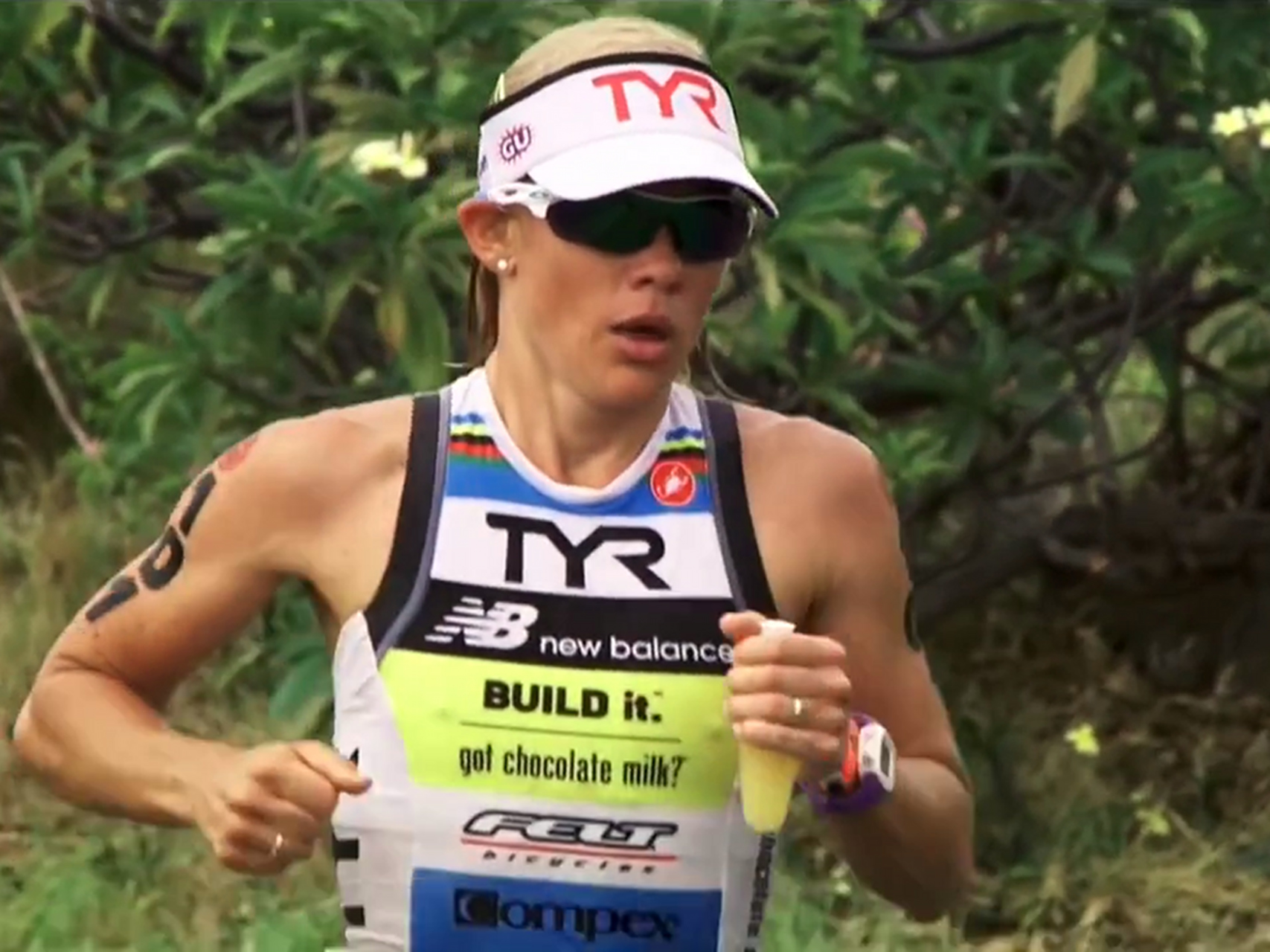

Personal information
- Nickname: Rinny
- Born: 26 March 1981 (age 45) Brisbane, Australia
- Height: 1.61 m (5 ft 3 1/2 in)
- Weight: 52 kg (115 lb)
- Spouse: Tim O'Donnell

Sport
- Country: Australia
- Coached by: Siri Lindley
Medal record
Women's Triathlon
Ironman 70.3 World Championship
Gold medal – first place	2007 Clearwater	Individual
Bronze medal – third place	2006 Clearwater	Individual
Ironman Triathlon World Championships
Gold medal – first place	2014 Kailua-Kona	Individual
Gold medal – first place	2013 Kailua-Kona	Individual
Gold medal – first place	2010 Kailua-Kona	Individual
Silver medal – second place	2009 Kailua-Kona	Individual
Silver medal – second place	2011 Kailua-Kona	Individual
Silver medal – second place	2016 Kailua-Kona	Individual
Bronze medal – third place	2012 Kailua-Kona	Individual
ITU Long Distance World Championships
Silver medal – second place	2005 Fredericia	Individual

Mirinda Carfrae (born 26 March 1981) is an Australian professional triathlete and an Ironman Triathlon world champion. Carfrae has achieved podium positions in six of her seven attempts at the Ironman World Championships: three 1st-place finishes (2010, 2013, 2014), three 2nd-place finishes (2009, 2011, 2016) and a 3rd place (2012, behind Leanda Cave and Caroline Steffen). She also won the 2007 Ironman 70.3 World Championship.

Carfrae held the Ironman Championship course record (8:52:14, set in 2013), until 2016 when it was beaten by Daniela Ryf (8:46:46) On her debut in 2009, she set a new course record for the marathon of 2:56:51, beating Wellington's record of 2:57:44 set the previous year. She again set new course records for the marathon in 2010 (2:53:32), 2011 (2:52:09, where Wellington—suffering from serious injuries—also beat Carfrae's 2010 record), 2013 (2:50:38, where only two men recorded a faster time), and 2014 (2:50:26).

Mirinda Carfrae holds a black belt in Taekwondo as well.

== Career ==
Carfrae competed in her first triathlon in 2000, at the age of 19. She went on to represent Australia at the Junior and U23 level, winning a silver medal at the 2003 ITU U23 World Championships. In 2004, she won a silver medal at the Salford Triathlon leg of the ITU Triathlon World Cup. She was an Australian Institute of Sport scholarship holder.

=== Long distance ===
Carfrae's first attempt at longer distances was at the Lake Tinaroo Half Ironman in September 2002, where she finished in second place behind Rebekah Keat, setting a new run course record of 1:21:20. Referring to this race, she later wrote, "I just remember feeling more comfortable racing the longer distance, and from then I knew I would be racing full Ironman at some point in future."

Carfrae achieved her first World Championship medal at the 2005 ITU Long Distance World Championships, where she finished 2nd in a time of 6:27:11. In 2007, she won the Ironman 70.3 World Championships in a course record time of 4:07:25. This win entitled Carfrae to race at the full Ironman World Championships at Kona, but she deferred her entry to 2009, when she felt she was ready for the longer distance. At the 2009 Ironman World Championship, Carfrae's first Ironman race, she finished second behind Chrissie Wellington, breaking Wellington's 2008 course record for the women's marathon with a time of 2:56:51. She wrote, "My first tri was at the end of 1999—my first Ironman was 10 years later. I waited until I felt I was physically and mentally strong enough to go the distance, and until I could be seriously competitive."

Carfrae set a course record at the Ironman World Championship at Kona, Hawaii in 2013 with a time of 8:52:14. Additionally, at that race she set a women's record time for the run portion of the course at 2:50:38. In 2015, she started the Ironman World Championship race at Kona, but withdrew from the bike leg due to pain from injuries sustained in a collision with a car earlier that week.

== Results ==
Date	Position	Event	Time
10 July 2022	2nd	Ironman 70.3 Oregon	4:05:26
11 October 2014	1st	Kona Ironman World Championships	9:00:55
20 July 2014	1st	Challenge Roth	8:38:53
12 October 2013	1st	Kona Ironman World Championships	8:52:14
3 June 2012	1st	Rev3 Half Quassy	4:27:02
22 April 2012	3rd	New Orleans Ironman 70.3	3:47:28
25 March 2012	3rd	Ironman Asia-Pacific Championship – Melbourne	9:04:00
8 October 2011	2nd	Kona Ironman World Championships	8:57:57
4 September 2011	2nd	Hy-Vee 5150 US Championship	1:59:20
17 July 2011	3rd	Vineman Ironman 70.3	4:17:49
12 June 2011	1st	Eagleman Ironman 70.3	4:15:31
5 June 2011	2nd	Rev3 Half Quassy	4:26:24
1 May 2011	3rd	St Croix Ironman 70.3	4:36:01
2 April 2011	1st	California Ironman 70.3	4:26:18
5 March 2011	2nd	Ironman New Zealand	9:31:33
9 October 2010	1st	Kona Ironman World Championships	8:58:36
12 September 2010	1st	Muskoka Ironman 70.3	4:28:36
1 August 2010	1st	Calgary Ironman 70.3	4:21:32
18 July 2010	1st	Vineman Ironman 70.3	4:15:51
12 June 2010	3rd	TriGrandPrix Basque Country	4:22:33
6 June 2010	1st	Rev3 Half Quassy	4:23:38
25 April 2010	2nd	St Anthony's Triathlon	2:00:20
27 March 2010	1st	California Ironman 70.3	4:20:29
10 October 2009	2nd	Kona Ironman World Championships	9:13:59
13 September 2009	1st	Muskoka Ironman 70.3	4:24:48
2 August 2009	1st	Calgary Ironman 70.3	4:11:05
28 June 2009	1st	Aflac Irongirl Atlanta	1:13:55
14 June 2009	1st	Eagleman Ironman 70.3	4:13:27
7 June 2009	1st	Rev3 Half Quassy	4:27:26
3 May 2009	2nd	St Croix Ironman 70.3	4:35:21
4 April 2009	1st	California Ironman 70.3	4:25:02
7 December 2008	2nd	Laguna Phuket Triathlon	2:50:02
16 November 2008	1st	St Croix Triathlon	2:20:27
8 November 2008	12th	Clearwater Ironman 70.3 World Championships	4:22:29
6 October 2008	13th	Dallas Triathlon	2:03:26
7 September 2008	5th	Los Angeles Triathlon	2:06:50
27 July 2008	1st	Newfoundland Ironman 70.3	4:27:23
12 July 2008	11th	Minneapolis Lifetime Fitness Triathlon	2:08:52
29 June 2008	1st	Buffalo Springs Lake Ironman 70.3	4:23:28
14 June 2008	1st	Battle at Midway Triathlon	2:04:56
1 June 2008	3rd	Escape from Alcatraz Triathlon	2:16:47
4 May 2008	1st	St Croix Ironman 70.3	4:33:39
27 April 2008	3rd	St Anthony's Triathlon	2:01:52
13 April 2008	1st	Las Vegas Iron Girl	1:56:22
29 March 2008	2nd	California Ironman 70.3	4:25:51
10 February 2008	1st	Geelong Ironman 70.3	4:24:27
2 December 2007	2nd	Laguna Phuket Triathlon	2:44:28
18 November 2007	1st	St Croix Triathlon	2:17:12
10 November 2007	1st	Clearwater Ironman 70.3 World Championships	4:07:25
14 October 2007	3rd	Dallas US Open Triathlon	1:59:11
9 September 2007	3rd	Los Angeles Triathlon	2:07:17
2 September 2007	2nd	Singapore Ironman 70.3	4:17:17
26 August 2007	5th	Chicago Triathlon	2:04:07
22 July 2007	1st	Spirit of Racine Half Ironman	4:16:43
15 July 2007	7th	Minneapolis Lifetime Fitness Triathlon	2:05:20
24 June 2007	2nd	Buffalo Springs Lake Triathlon	4:20:06
10 June 2007	2nd	Eagleman Ironman 70,3	4:13:19
5 May 2007	2nd	Wildflower	4:38:14
29 April 2007	4th	St Anthony's Triathlon	2:00:18
25 March 2007	18th	Mooloolaba World Cup	2:03:16
4 February 2007	5th	Perth	1:04:51
11 November 2006	3rd	Clearwater Ironman 70.3 World Championships	4:16:44
30 July 2006	22nd	Salford BG Triathlon World Cup	2:08:16
23 July 2006	25th	Corner Brook BG Triathlon World Cup	2:13:27
16 July 2006	16th	Minneapolis Lifetime Fitness Triathlon	2:06:29
21 May 2006	1st	Baja Ironman 70.3	4:31:13
7 May 2006	1st	St Croix Ironman 70.3	4:30:13
16 April 2006	4th	Ishigaki ITU Triathlon World Cup	1:58:58
19 February 2006	11th	Hobart ITU Triathlon Oceania Cup	2:08:34
10 September 2005	31st	Gamagori ITU Triathlon World Champs	2:04:43
6 August 2005	2nd	Fredericia Long Course World Championships	6:27:10
23 July 2005	8th	Edmonton ITU Triathlon World Cup	2:03:08
17 July 2005	9th	Cornerbrook ITU Triathlon World Cup	2:11:20
26 June 2005	1st	Mountaineer Half Ironman	4:36:55
13 June 2005	3rd	Eagleman Half Ironman	4:25:25
22 May 2005	2nd	Florida Half Ironman	4:30:20
15 May 2005	7th	Ishigaki ITU Triathlon World Cup	2:03:12
16 April 2005	10th	Honolulu ITU World Cup	2:09:37
27 February 2005	2nd	Port Macquarie Half Ironman	4:13:04
26 September 2004	1st	Nice Long Course Triathlon	7:15:07
25 July 2004	2nd	Salford ITU Triathlon World Cup	2:09:16
18 July 2004	10th	Corner Brook ITU Triathlon World Cup	2:16:28
11 July 2004	14th	Edmonton ITU World Cup	2:01:16
9 May 2004	12th	Madeira ITU Triathlon U23 World Championships	2:01:07
7 June 2003	12th	Tongyeong ITU Triathlon World Cup	2:00:53
15 June 2003	4th	Gamagori ITU Triathlon World Cup	1:59:04
27 July 2003	15th	Salford ITU Triathlon World Cup	2:06:31
3 August 2003	10th	Tiszaujvaros ITU Triathlon World Cup	1:58:51
10 August 2003	4th	New York ITU Triathlon World Cup	2:01:07
6 December 2003	2nd	Queenstown ITU Triathlon U23 World Champs	2:11:53
9 November 2002	2nd	Cancun ITU Triathlon U23 World Championships	2:02:41
1 September 2002	2nd	Lake Tinaroo Half Ironman	4:34:56
28 July 2002	38th	Tiszaujvaros ITU triathlon World Cup	2:02:36

- source: "Results". mirindacarfrae.com. Archived from the original on 6 December 2011.
