= Sandra Wallenhorst =

German triathlete

Medal record

Women's triathlon

Representing Germany

Ironman World Championship
Bronze medal – third place	2008	Individual

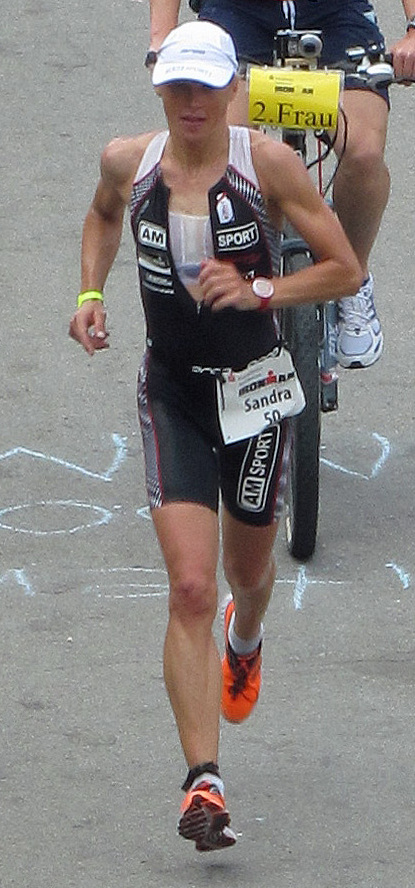
2010, Ironman Germany

Sandra Wallenhorst (born 1972) is a professional triathlete from Germany. She competes in the World Triathlon Corporation's (WTC) Ironman and Ironman 70.3 triathlons.

Sandra's time of 8:47:26 at Ironman Austria 2008 was the fastest women's time in the world in the WTC Ironman 2008 series, where 6,223 women finished. (286 professionals + 5,937 amateurs)

== Results ==
Series	Race	Overall Position	Gender Position	Category Position	Category	Time	Qualified
WTC Ironman 2008	World Championship 2008	80	3	3	F PRO	9:22:52	World Championship 2009
WTC Ironman 2008	Austria 2008	20	1	1	F PRO	8:47:26	World Championship 2008
WTC Ironman 70.3 2008	Austria 2008	62	3	3	F PRO	4:26:25	70.3 World Championship 2008
