= Leanda Cave =

British triathlete

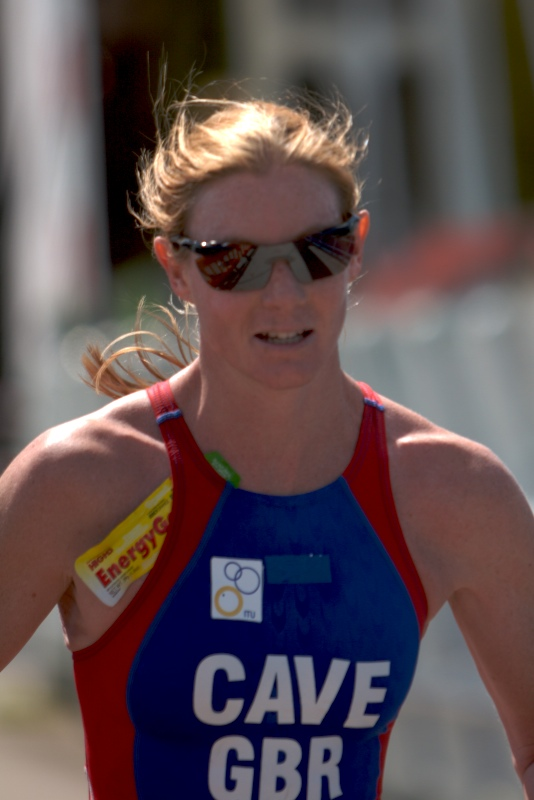
- Leanda Cave at the 2007 Salford Triathlon

Personal information
- Nicknames: Hoffi, Superbird
- Born: 9 March 1978 (age 48) Louth, England
- Height: 1.78 m (5 ft 10 in)
- Weight: 58 kg (128 lb)

Sport
- Country: Great Britain; Wales
- Turned pro: 2000
- Coached by: Cliff English
Medal record
Women's triathlon
Representing Great Britain
Ironman Triathlon World Championships
Gold medal – first place	2012 Kailua-Kona	Elite
Ironman World Championship 70.3
Gold medal – first place	2012 Las Vegas	Elite
Silver medal – second place	2010 Clearwater	Elite
Bronze medal – third place	2007 Clearwater	Elite
World Triathlon Series
Gold medal – first place	2002 Cancún	Individual
ITU Long Distance World Championships
Silver medal – second place	2011 Henderson	Individual
Gold medal – first place	2007 Lorient	Individual
ETU Triathlon European Championships
Silver medal – second place	2002 Győr	Individual
European Under-23 Triathlon Championships
Gold medal – first place	2001 Carlsbad	Individual
Representing Wales
Commonwealth Games
Silver medal – second place	2002 Manchester	Individual

Leanda Rosemarie Cave (born 9 March 1978) is a retired British triathlete and a four-time world champion across various formats. Cave is the 2002 World Triathlon Champion (then the ITU World Champion), the 2007 ITU Long Distance Triathlon World Champion and the 2012 Ironman Triathlon and Ironman 70.3 World Champion, the first woman in the history of the sport to win both Ironman titles in the same year. Cave competed internationally for Wales and Great Britain.

== Early and personal life ==
Cave was born in Louth, Lincolnshire, England. At the age of four Cave's parents (her father was a carpenter) migrated to Queensland, Australia, where she went to school. Returning to England, as her mother is Welsh, she chose to represent Wales. Growing up Cave swam, ran cross country and was a surf lifeguard.

In February 2013, Cave was diagnosed with skin cancer.

== Career ==
Cave entered her first triathlon at the encouragement of her sister, who already participated in them.

In 2001 Cave became European Under-23 champion. A year later she would internationally break through at the senior level as she won the silver medal at the 2002 Commonwealth Games in Manchester. She won another silver medal at the European Championships, then had greater success when she took the gold and the World title in Cancún, Mexico in November 2002. In 2002, she was nominated for the Welsh Sports Personality of the Year Award.

Cave struggled with injury in 2003 and was unable to defend her world title, although she did take part in the BBC series Superstars.

Cave won her second world title in 2007 at the ITU Long Distance Triathlon World Championships in Lorient, France. On 28 March 2008, at the Ford Ironman 70.3 California triathlon, Cave came in third place behind Erika Csomor and Mirinda Carfrae. At the 2010 Ironman World Championship 70.3, she took second place.

On 30 April 2011, Cave won the Wildflower Long Course triathlon held at Lake San Antonio, California. She also has won the Escape from Alcatraz triathlon in San Francisco, most recently on 10 June 2012. Later that year she won her first Ironman event at Ironman Arizona.

On 9 September 2012, at the Ironman 70.3 World Championship, Cave came in first place. On 13 October 2012, at the Ironman World Championship, Cave came in first place. About 3 miles from the finish, Cave overtook Switzerland's Caroline Steffen who had held the lead in the run from the start and then went on to win the race. By winning both the 70.3 world championship and the Ironman World Championship in the same year, Cave became the first woman to ever achieve the 'double'. Australia's Craig Alexander accomplished this feat on the men's side in 2011.

Cave struggled with injury in 2013 and though she made the start line in both events, she finished 12th in both the 70.3 and Ironman World Championships.

In 2014, Cave started the year focusing on short course triathlons in a bid to make the Team Wales Commonwealth Games Squad, which despite a series of good results in qualifying competitions, including a win at Valparaiso ITU World Cup on 30 March 2014, ended with her non-selection for the games.

Cave won Ironman Sweden 2014, finishing with the fastest times in all three disciplines.
