= Becky Lavelle =

American triathlete

- Born: Rebecca Gibbs; December 5, 1974 (age 51); Minnetonka, Minnesota, U.S.
- Education: B.Sc. Kinesiology, Louisiana State University, summa cum laude
- Occupations: Former Professional Triathlete; 2008 Olympic Alternate; Race Director; Competitive Runner; Coach
- Years active: 2004–present
- Spouse: Brian Lavelle (m. 2002)

Rebecca "Becky" Lavelle (née Gibbs, born December 5, 1974) is an American former professional triathlete, race director, runner, and coach. As a professional triathlete, she has had over 50 career wins in Olympic and Half-Ironman distance races.

== Early life ==
Lavelle began competing athletically from a young age. She started swimming competitively in Minnesota when she was nine and continued throughout high school.

At the age of 12, Lavelle was named best swimmer of her age group in Minnesota, a title she maintained for seven years. In 1993, during her senior year of high school, she was named (overall) Female Swimmer of the Year for Minnesota.

Lavelle went on to swim competitively at Louisiana State University (LSU) in college, where she became a ten-time NCAA All-American swimmer. In1997, she was named NCAA state-level "Woman of the Year" (Louisiana).

In 1998, Lavelle graduated summa cum laude with a B.Sc. in kinesiology.

== Career ==
- 2003: Pan Am Games bronze medalist
- 2005: winner US National Championships and Chicago Triathlon
- 2005: named "Comeback Athlete of the Year" by Triathlete Magazine
- 2006 and 2008: named Multi-sport Athlete of the Year by USA Triathlon
- 2007: winner of US Long Distance Triathlon National Championships
- 2008 named to 2008 Beijing U.S. Olympic Team
- 2008: named the Overall Lifetime Fitness Triathlon Series winner
- 2012: winner of Rev3 Florida Half-Ironman in Venice, FL

Following her official retirement from triathlon, Lavelle began running with Arete, a women's running club based in Santa Cruz, CA.

== Philanthropy ==
In 2008, Lavelle co-founded the non-profit organization Jenny's Light in honor of her late sister Jenny and her sister's infant son, Graham. The mission of Jenny's Light was to improve and save lives by raising awareness of perinatal mood disorders, including postpartum depression. Jenny's Light Run events were held annually in Los Gatos, CA until 2022 in order to raise funds for organizations working on the issue.

== Master's running personal records ==
2017	Marathon	California International Marathon (CIM)	United States Sacramento, CA	02:56:50	Marathon debut
2019	Half-Marathon	Monterey Bay Half-Marathon	United States Monterey, CA	01:24:00	
2017	10K	She Is Beautiful	United States Santa Cruz, CA	00:37:49	
2018	5K	Silicon Valley Turkey Trot	United States San Jose, CA	00:18:30	

== Notable triathlon accomplishments ==
Year	Place	Competition	Location	Time	Comment
2012	1	Rev3 Florida Half-Ironman	United States Venice, FL	03:54:00	Win & last career race as a pro
2012	1	5150 New Orleans	United States New Orleans	02:11:52	
2011	2	The Triathlon at Pacific Grove	United States Pacific Grove	02:06:13	
2011	3	5150 Washington	United States Washington, D.C.		
2011	3	Escape from Alcatraz Triathlon	United States San Francisco	02:19:21	After birth of first baby
2009	1	Ironman 70.3 Lake Stevens	United States Washington	03:56:36	
2009	3	Escape from Alcatraz Triathlon	United States San Francisco	02:24:00	
2008	3	Ironman 70.3 World Championship	United States Clearwater	04:07:32	New swim record - 00:23:03
2007	1	Wildflower Triathlon	United States Lake San Antonio	04:35:19	
2007	3	Ironman 70.3 California	United States Oceanside		
2007	1	USA Long Distance Triathlon National Championships	United States		U.S. Championships
2006	1	Escape from Alcatraz Triathlon	United States San Francisco	02:21:05	
2006	24	ITU Triathlon World Championships	Switzerland Lausanne	02:08:00	
2006	1	Vineman Ironman 70.3	United States Sonoma County	04:29:10	
2005	34	ITU Triathlon World Championships	Japan Gamagori	02:05:24	
2005	1	USA Triathlon National Championships	United States Bellingham	02:07:55	National Champion
2003	15	ITU Triathlon World Championships	New Zealand Queenstown	02:10:27	
2003	2	Wildflower Triathlon	United States Lake San Antonio		
2003	3	USA Triathlon National Championships	United States San Francisco		U.S. Championships
2002	2	Wildflower Triathlon	United States Lake San Antonio		
2001	2	Wildflower Triathlon	United States Lake San Antonio		
