= Andy Potts =

American triathlete (born 1976)

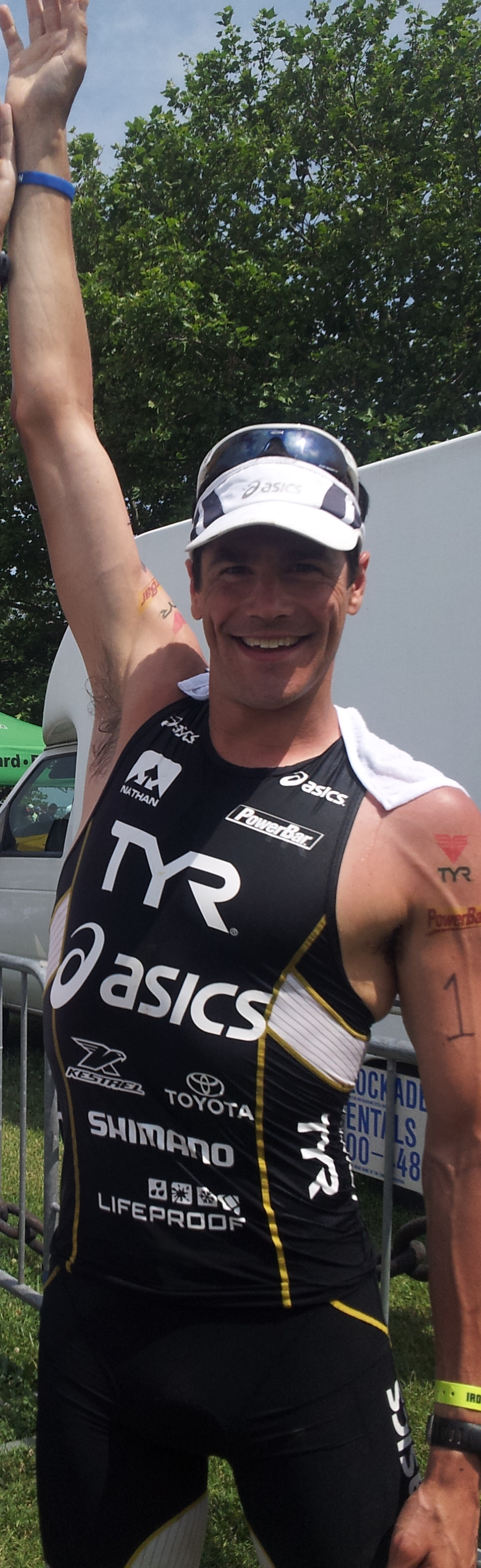
- Andy Potts at 2013 Ironman 70.3 Eagleman

Personal information
- Born: December 28, 1976 (age 49) Hershey, Pennsylvania, US
- Height: 6 ft 3 in (191 cm)
- Weight: 175 lb (79 kg)

Sport
- Country: United States
- Sport: Triathlon
- College team: University of Michigan; Swimming, Track
Medal record
Men's Swimming
Summer Universiade
Bronze medal – third place	1995 Fukuoka	400m Medley
Men's triathlon
Pan American Games
Gold medal – first place	2007 Rio de Janeiro	Individual
Ironman World Championship 70.3
Gold medal – first place	2007	Individual

Andrew Robert Potts (born December 28, 1976) is a triathlete from the United States. He competed in triathlon at the 2004 Summer Olympics and is the 2007 Ironman 70.3 World Champion. Prior to triathlon, Potts was a swimmer, winning the bronze medal in the men's 400m individual medley at the 1995 Summer Universiade and earning a spot on the USA Swimming national team, where he would place fourth at the 1996 Olympic Trials in the 400 IM.

== Personal life ==
Raised in Princeton, New Jersey, Potts graduated from Princeton High School in 1995.

While attending school at Michigan, Potts met his future wife, Lisa Simes, who was a member of the University of Michigan gymnastics teams. Simes was an acrobat for the Cirque du Soleil show, O, in Las Vegas. The two married on June 30, 2004. They have a son, Boston Thomas Potts, and a daughter, Sloane Potts.

== Career ==
Potts graduated from the University of Michigan in 2000 with a B.A. in English and a secondary teaching certificate. At Michigan, he swam for the Michigan Wolverines swimming and diving team from 1995 to 1999 under Head Coach Jon Urbanchek, serving as team captain for the 1998–99 season. Potts was a six-time NCAA All-American swimmer while at Michigan and a two-time Big 10 individual champion. He trained and competed with the Michigan track team in 1999–2000 under head coaches Jack Harvey and Ron Warhurst.

=== 2003–2006 ===
Potts began competing as a professional triathlete in 2003 and was named USA Triathlon Rookie of the Year. He was also the only athlete to break into the Top 100 World Rankings as a rookie. Potts competed at the second Olympic triathlon at the 2004 Summer Olympics after only participating in the sport of triathlon for 22 months. He placed twenty-second with a total time of 1:55:36.47. In 2005 and 2006, Potts competed in a variety ITU Triathlon World Cup races, accumulating a number of top-three podium finishes and finished out 2006 ranked third in the world. Potts was recognized as USAT Triathlete of the Year in 2006.

=== 2007–2009 ===
In 2007, Potts won the triathlon event at the 2007 Pan American Games. Later that year, Potts would win the 2007 Ironman 70.3 World Championship in Clearwater, Florida, with a time of 3:42:33. In 2009, he also added a title at the Wildflower Triathlon, winning in 3:59:41. On June 27, 2010, Potts captured his first career Ironman Triathlon win in Coeur d'Alene, Idaho, with a winning time of 8:24:40. His best finish at the Ironman World Championship is a 7th-place finish at the 2009 Championships. He was recognized again as USAT Triathlete of the Year in 2007 and 2008.

=== 2010–2011 ===
After finishing the swim in 2nd place, Potts took the lead on the bike and finished Ironman Coeur d'Alene with a strong 1st-place finish. In the fall, he set a new course record at Ironman Cozumel with a 2:52:19 marathon, the fastest time of the day. Andy Potts earned victories at Ironman 70.3 New Orleans and Ironman 70.3 Boulder, and at Ironman 70.3 Timberman, he earned his third victory in as many attempts.

In 2011 Potts had several successful performances at the half-ironman distance, including first-place finishes at Ironman 70.3 Florida, Ironman 70.3 Oceanside, and Ironman 70.3 Vineman. He also earned victories at Philadelphia Triathlon and CapTex Triathlon in Austin, Texas.

=== 2012–2016 ===
In 2012, Andy Potts won the Ironman 70.3 California triathlon in Oceanside, CA for the fourth time. Later that year, Potts took first in Ironman 70.3 St. Croix in the US Virgin Islands. Potts is considered the winningest male ever to compete in the Escape From Alcatraz Triathlon, after having won the event for the 5th time in June 2012. Later in the year, Potts also won Ironman Lake Placid, Ironman 70.3, and Ironman 70.3 Branson. In 2012, he accomplished his best performance to date at the Ironman World Championship in Kona, Hawaii with a 7th-place finish as the first American.

Potts, in 2013, won the Ironman 70.3 California triathlon in Oceanside, CA for the fifth time, edging out Jesse Thomas by 10 seconds. Potts also took first in Ironman 70.3 Eagleman, in Cambridge Maryland. Potts was the first repeat winner at Ironman Lake Placid, winning by 5 minutes over Daniel Fontana. The next year Potts won the Ironman Coeur d'Alene 140.6 On June 29, with a time of 8:25:44, edging Viktor Zyemtsev by less than three minutes. He finished fourth at the 2014 Ironman World Championship in Kona, HI on October 10, 2014 in a time of 08:21:38.

Potts began the 2015 season at the inaugural Challenge Dubai with a 12th-place finish, which was a result of a penalty that occurred during the bike leg. At Ironman Oceanside 70.3, Potts earned a silver medal finishing 2nd to the reigning Oceanside champion Jan Frodeno. Potts has since put together 1st, 2nd, 1st-place finishes at New Orleans 70.3, Texas 70.3, and Chattanooga 70.3 respectively. Potts won the Ironman Coeur d'Alene 140.6 on June 28, with a time of 8:20:35.

In 2016, Potts won the Ironman Canada 140.6 on July 24, with a time of 8:20:23.
