= Rubén Figueres =

Spanish-born advertising executive

- Born: 1974; Gandia, Valencian Community, Spain
- Occupations: Advertising executive, film producer
- Organization(s): Alario Group; New Roots Films
- Known for: Hispanic advertising for Barack Obama's 2012 campaign
- Notable work: De Gandía a la Casa Blanca (2015); Longevity Hackers (2024)

Rubén Figueres (born 1974) is a Spanish-born advertising executive and film producer based in Chicago.

== Career ==
Figueres is from Gandia in the Valencian Community. After completing an MBA at ESADE in Barcelona, he moved to Chicago, United States in 1998 and began working in advertising in 2000. He worked for the media agency Starcom and for the Spanish-language network Telemundo, before founding Alario Group, a Chicago agency that focuses on the Hispanic market, which he has led since 2002.

Figueres worked on Rahm Emanuel's 2011 campaign for mayor of Chicago. For Obama's 2012 campaign, Alario Group produced advertising aimed at Hispanic voters.

In 2015 Figueres published De Gandia a la Casa Blanca (From Gandia to the White House), a book about his move to the United States and his work on Obama's re-election campaign.

=== Film production ===
In 2024 Figueres produced Longevity Hackers, a documentary about research into ageing and life extension. It was narrated by Edward Norton. The film was released on streaming platforms in December 2024. Figueres produced it through the company New Roots Films.

He was also a co-producer of God Bless Bitcoin (2024), a documentary about the cryptocurrency Bitcoin.

Following the film's release, Figueres has spoken about longevity at industry events, including Life Summit Berlin.

== Personal life ==
Figueres is also an amateur triathlete. He has competed in age-group world championships, including the 2004 ITU Triathlon Age-Group World Championships in Funchal, Portugal, the 2007 Ironman World Championship in Kona, Hawaii (having qualified at Ironman Wisconsin in 2006 ), and the 2012 ITU Cross Triathlon World Championships in Shelby County, Alabama.
