= Rebecca Preston =

Australian triathlete (born 1979)

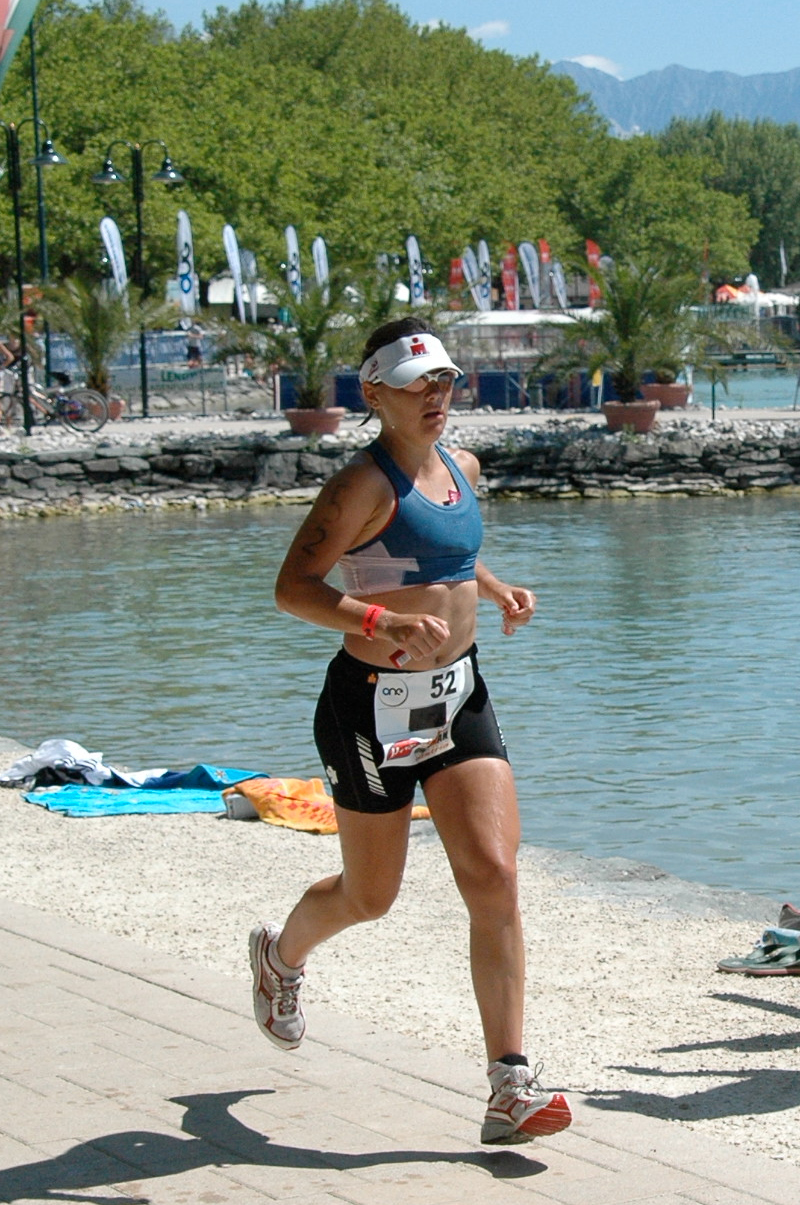
Preston in 2006

Rebecca Preston (born 1979) is an Australian triathlete. She competes in the Ironman Triathlon and finished fifth in the 2007 Ironman World Championship. In 2005, Preston won the Ironman UK, in 2006 she won Ironman Austria and Ironman Switzerland, while in 2007 she won Ironman Switzerland and Antwerp Ironman 70.3.
