= T. J. Tollakson =

Trenton Joel Tollakson
Personal information
- Nickname: T. J.
- Born: August 12, 1980 (age 45); USA

Sport
- Country: USA
- Sport: Triathlete, Ironman

Trenton Joel Tollakson (born August 12, 1980) is a US triathlete, ironman champion (2011, 2014) and North American champion (2014).

== Career ==
Tollakson ran his first triathlon in July 2001, and he has been a professional triathlete since 2005. In July 2011, he achieved his first long-distance victory at Lake Placid (3.86 km swimming, 180.2 km cycling and 42.195 km running).

In August 2014 he won his second ironman race at the Ironman Mont-Tremblant with a new course record and won the North American Championships.

In November 2016 he was - as in the previous year - third at the Ironman Arizona.

In May 2019 he won the Ironman 70.3 Gulf Coast, his third Ironman 70.3 race.

In June 2021, T. J. retired from the pro field. His last professional race was the Ironman 70.3 in his home town of Des Moines, IA where he finished 12th.

== Dimond Bikes ==
In 2011 T. J. founded his own manufacturing company Dimond Bikes in Des Moines, IA. Starting when T. J. won his first Ironman at Lake Placid New York on a modified and re-branded Zipp 2001 beam bike manufactured in 1996. This 15 year old bicycle was wind tunnel tested as one of the fastest bicycles at the time and Tollakson used his knowledge of these wind tunnels and connections with current employees at Zipp to procure and modify the Zipp bike for racing. Tollakson tried to convince Zipp to start manufacturing the Zipp 2001, and after Zipp declined interest they instead offered support in helping Tollakson make his own. Tollakson and few Zipp employees redesigned the Zipp 2001 beam bike frame and by May 2012 the first prototypes of the original Dimond Bike were designed. In August 2012 Tollakson raced the one and only Ironman NYC on his new prototype frame. In November 2013 the first mass production of Dimond bikes out of their factory in Des Moines, IA was launched. It was at Ironman Arizona that the Dimond Bike premiered along with the wind tunnel reports confirming its spot at the top of the list of “ world's fastest bikes”. In 2016, Dimond Bikes launched a new model of beam bike called the Dimond Marquise featuring improved aerodynamics and refined integrated storage solutions. In 2018 they released a disc brake version of the Marquise at the Ironman World Championships in Kona, HI. In 2019 the company released yet another beam bike model titled the Dimond Mogul. The Mogul combines superior aerodynamic underbody improvements with the integrated storage of the Marquise.

== Personal life ==
TJ is a 1999 graduate of Ankeny High School where he earned 11 varsity athletic letters (4x Cross Country, 2x Swimming, 1x Wrestling, 4x soccer). He played soccer his freshman year of college at Boston University. He transferred to the University of Iowa where he was a charter member of the Iowa TriHawk club triathlon team. TJ graduated from the University of Iowa in 2003 with a Bachelor of Science Engineering in Industrial Engineering with a Technological Entrepreneurship Certificate. He has been married to Ashley Tousley since January 2011 and they both live in Des Moines, USA with their 3 children.

== Sporting successes ==
Triathlon short and middle distance
Date/Year	Position	Competition	Location	Time	Remarks
2006	7	Eagleman Ironman 70.3	United States Cambridge (Maryland)	04:04:47	
10 June 2007	1	Eagleman Ironman 70.3	United States Cambridge (Maryland)	03:46:28.60	
2007	3	Vineman Ironman 70.3	United States Sonoma County		
2010	7	Ironman 70.3 Florida	United States Orlando	03:58:59	With a very fast cycle race T. J. went into the running as the leader, but then fell back several places.
25 April 2010	7	Ironman 70.3 Texas	United States Galveston Island	03:57:06	
27 June 2010	4	Ironman 70.3 Buffalo Springs	United States Lubbock	04:00:43	Behind winner, Chris Lieto
18 July 2010	3	Ironman 70.3 Racine	United States Racine	04:00:36	
12 June 2011	1	Eagleman Ironman 70.3	United States Cambridge (Maryland)	03:54:39	
10 June 2012	3	Eagleman Ironman 70.3	United States Cambridge (Maryland)	03:48:52	
28 October 2012	2	Ironman 70.3 Austin	United States Austin	03:52:07	
5 May 2014	9	USA Middle Distance Triathlon National Championships	United States St. George	04:03:39	State championships at middle distance in Ironman 70.3 St. George
3 December 2017	3	Ironman 70.3 Cartagena	Colombia Cartagena	03:55:14	
11 May 2019	1	Ironman 70.3 Gulf Coast	United States Panama City Beach	03:54:19	
20 June 2021	12	Ironman 70.3 Des Moines	United States Des Moines, IA	2:49:36	Bike course shortened due to weather delays

Triathlon Long distance
Date/Year	Position	Competition	Location	Time	Remarks
26 August 2007	3	Ironman Louisville	United States Louisville		Third in Kentucky – behind the two Australians, Chris McDonald and Craig McKenzie
2007	30	Ironman Hawaii	United States Hawaii	09:03:05	
13 April 2008	2	Ironman Arizona	United States Tempe	08:34:36	17 seconds behind the winner, the Hungarian, József Major
2008	251	Ironman Hawaii	United States Hawaii	09:53:43	
2009	2	Ironman Coeur d’Alene	United States Idaho	08:42:03	
2009	36	Ironman Hawaii	United States Hawaii	09:06:20	
2009	2	Ironman Arizona	United States Tempe	08:20:22	Second behind fellow countryman, Jordan Rapp
2010	39	Ironman Hawaii	United States Hawaii	08:54:00	
7 May 2011	3	Ironman St. George	United States St. George	08:40:20	
24 July 2011	1	Ironman USA	United States Lake Placid	08:25:15	
8 October 2011	DNF	Ironman Hawaii	United States Hawaii	–	
11 August 2012	6	Ironman New York	United States New York City	08:33:01	
18 November 2012	3	Ironman Arizona	United States Tempe	08:07:39	
23 June 2013	3	Ironman Coeur d’Alene	United States Idaho	08:32:09	
12 October 2013	22	Ironman Hawaii	United States Hawaii	08:43:56	
17 August 2014	1	Ironman Mont-Tremblant	Canada Québec	08:16:17	
29 March 2015	18	Ironman South Africa	South Africa Port Elizabeth	09:06:24	
27 September 2015	9	Ironman Chattanooga	United States Chattanooga	08:21:48	
15 November 2015	3	Ironman Arizona	United States Tempe	08:04:17	
20 November 2016	3	Ironman Arizona	United States Tempe	08:02:30	Ironman personal best
10 September 2017	2	Ironman Wisconsin	United States Madison	08:28:17	
18 November 2018	3	Ironman Arizona	United States Tempe	08:09:53	

(DNF – Did Not Finish)
