= Nina Kraft =

German triathlete (1968–2020)

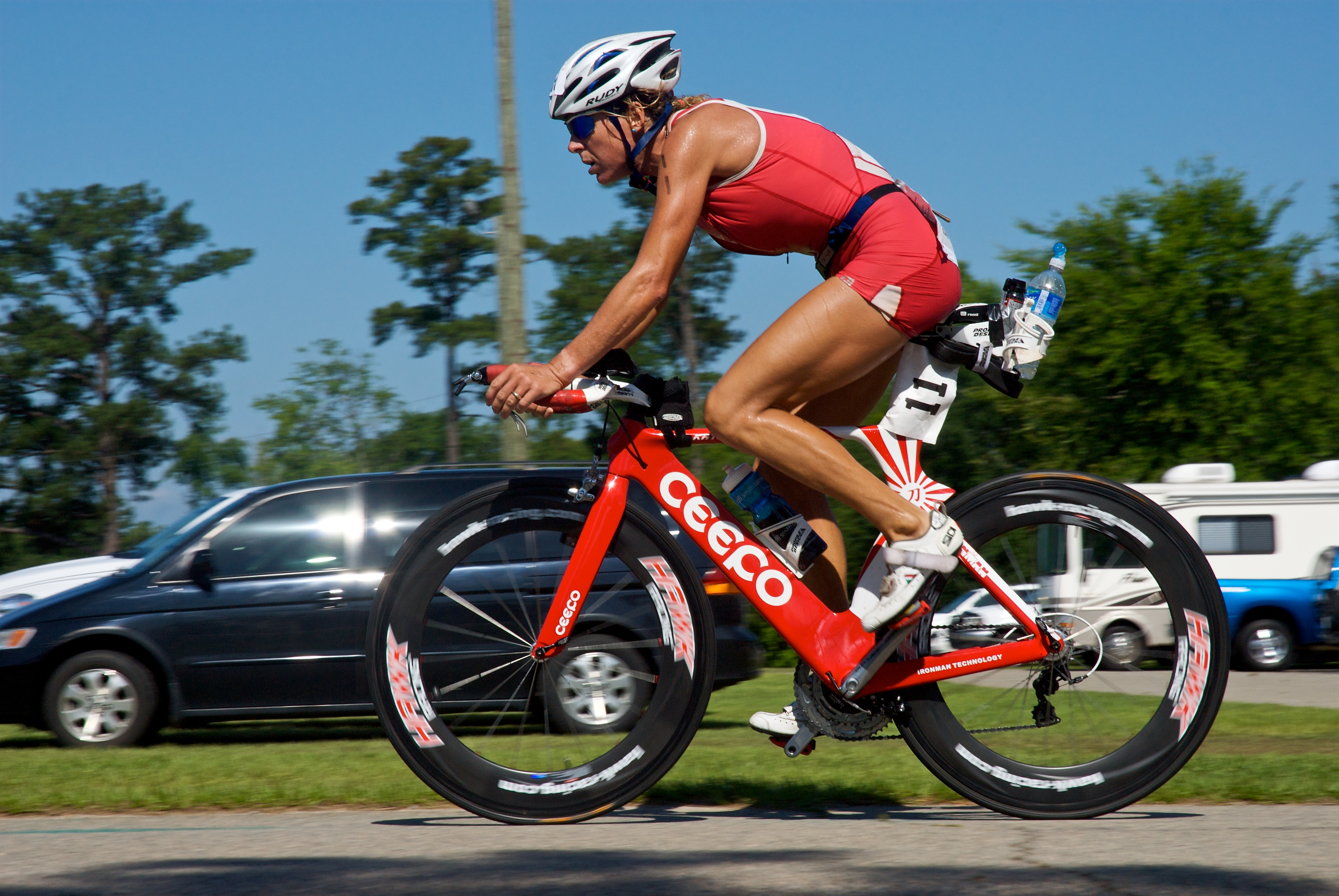

Personal information
- Born: 31 December 1968 Braunschweig
- Died: 17 August 2020 (aged 51)
- Height: 1.7 m (5 ft 7 in)
- Weight: 61 kg (134 lb)

Sport
- Country: Germany

Achievements and titles
- Personal best: 8:58:43

Nina Kraft (31 December 1968 – 17 August 2020) was a German professional triathlete from Braunschweig.

== Career ==
Kraft worked as a drafter until 1998, when she became a full-time professional athlete. In addition to being a pro triathlete Kraft was also an artist. On her website she states that she "uses art to help her switch off and relax."

=== 2004 Ironman World Championship ===
Following her win at Ironman Germany in July 2004 Kraft crossed the finish line in first place a few months later in October at the Ironman World Championship as the apparent Ironman World Champion. However, a month after being declared the winner, Kraft tested positive for Erythropoietin, better known as EPO. She and her coach, Martin Malleirer, admitted to the decision to take the performance-enhancing drug. As a result, she was stripped of her title and the second-place finisher Natascha Badmann was awarded her fifth Ironman world title.

Kraft was banned by the German Triathlon Federation (DTU), for one year, after a positive drugs test. This ban ended on 12 November 2005. The privately owned World Triathlon Corporation banned Kraft from all Ironman events worldwide until 16 October 2006. As a result of Kraft and Katja Schumacher's doping cases, the DTU created the Elitepass: only Elitepass holders would be eligible for prize money, and they would be subject to unannounced drug testing.

== Comeback ==
After the end of her German ban, she trained in Clermont, Florida. She joined the Braunschweig club Tri-Lions and applied for an Elitepass from the DTU.

On 12 February 2006, she entered her first post-ban race, winning second place at the 15th Triathlon De Santos in Brazil. In August 2006, she won the German championship at the half Iron distance race in Kulmbach with a lead of 12 minutes. In May 2007 she won the Ironman Brazil, and on 3 November of the same year, she won the Florida Ironman with a time of 9 hours 5 minutes and 35 seconds, breaking the course record by 20 minutes.

On 1 February 2009, Kraft won the Tallahassee Marathon with a new course record of 2:45, and she won the Ironman Louisville in 2009, 2011 and 2014, making her the oldest female Ironman gold medalist at the age of 45.

== Notable results ==
- First place
  - Ironman Louisville 2014 - (9:31:19)
  - Ironman Louisville 2011 - (9:38:14)
  - Ironman Louisville 2009 - (9:20:21)
  - Ironman Florida 2007 - (9:05:35)
  - Ironman Brazil 2007 - (9:12:39)
  - Opel Ironman Germany Frankfurt 2004 - (8:58:43)
  - Kohler Haardman Oer Erkenschwick 2004 - (3:56:21)
  - Half-Ironman St. Croix 2004 - (4:37:01)
  - Ironman Germany Frankfurt 2003 - (9:03:11)
  - Quelle Challenge Roth 2002 - (9:12:41)
  - Ironman Europe Roth 2001 - (9:24:29)
  - Ironman South Africa 2001 - (9:33:11)
- Second place
  - Ironman Louisville 2007 (9:51:53)
  - Ironman Hawaii 2002 - (9:14:23)
  - UK Half-Ironman Llanberis 2002 - (4:25:48)
  - Ironman Europe Roth 1999 - (9:29:25)
  - Neuseeland WM Mitteldistanz 1999 - (4:33:08)
- Third place
  - Ironman Hawaii 2003 - (9:17:16)
  - Ironman Hawaii 2000 - (9:41:01)
- Fourth place
  - Ironman Europe Roth 2000 - (9:40:01)
- Sixth place
  - Ironman Neuseeland 1999 - (9:38:51)
  - Ironman Europe Roth 1998 - (9:57:44)
- 16th place
  - Ironman WM Hawaii 1999 - (9:52:37)
- 50th place
  - Ironman WM Hawaii 1998 - (11:02:47)

Two 2009 marathon wins at Tallahassee (2:45) & Gasparilla (2:47) where Kraft claimed both the masters & overall female titles.
