= 2007 Ironman World Championship =

The 2007 Ford Ironman World Championship was a triathlon race held on October 13, 2007 in Kailua, Hawaii County, Hawaii. It was the 31st Ironman World Championship, which has been held annually in Hawaii since 1978. The champions were Chris McCormack and Chrissie Wellington. The championship was organised by the World Triathlon Corporation (WTC).

== Medallists ==
=== Men ===
Pos.	Time (h:mm:ss)	Name	Country	Split times (h:mm:ss)				
Pos.	Time (h:mm:ss)	Name	Country	Swim	T1	Bike	T2	Run
Gold medal	8:15:34	Chris McCormack	Australia	51:48	2:23	4:37:32	1:52	2:42:02
Silver medal	8:19:04	Craig Alexander	Australia	51:40	1:58	4:38:11	2:04	2:45:13
Bronze medal	8:21:30	Torbjørn Sindballe	Denmark	53:25	1:50	4:25:26	3:26	2:57:25
4	8:22:33	Tim DeBoom	United States	51:39	1:53	4:38:20	2:15	2:48:29
5	8:23:31	Marino Vanhoenacker	Belgium	53:21	1:59	4:33:06	2:08	2:53:00
6	8:25:49	Chris Lieto	United States	51:37	2:11	4:28:18	3:29	3:00:16
7	8:26:00	Eneko Llanos	Spain	51:47	2:01	4:38:12	2:18	2:51:43
8	8:30:01	Luc Van Lierde	Belgium	51:42	1:46	4:38:18	2:48	2:55:28
9	8:33:28	Michael Lovato	United States	53:27	1:50	4:41:32	2:38	2:54:03
10	8:35:10	Patrick Vernay	New Caledonia	53:24	1:59	4:49:17	2:19	2:48:13

=== Women ===
Pos.	Time (h:mm:ss)	Name	Country	Split times (h:mm:ss)				
Pos.	Time (h:mm:ss)	Name	Country	Swim	T1	Bike	T2	Run
Gold medal	9:08:45	Chrissie Wellington	United Kingdom	58:09	2:22	5:06:15	2:03	2:59:58
Silver medal	9:14:04	Samantha McGlone	Canada	58:07	2:15	5:10:31	2:20	3:00:52
Bronze medal	9:19:13	Kate Major	Australia	58:08	2:22	5:10:16	1:54	3:06:35
4	9:26:47	Joanna Lawn	New Zealand	58:15	2:09	5:10:18	2:22	3:13:45
5	9:26:55	Rebecca Preston	Australia	58:08	2:05	5:17:23	2:07	3:07:14
6	9:27:19	Rebekah Keat	Australia	58:13	2:06	5:16:03	2:43	3:08:17
7	9:33:34	Dede Griesbauer	United States	53:27	2:10	5:13:06	2:51	3:22:03
8	9:36:10	Leanda Cave	United Kingdom	53:13	2:19	5:13:46	2:32	3:24:22
9	9:37:54	Belinda Granger	Australia	58:07	2:20	5:10:18	2:53	3:24:19
10	9:39:47	Erika Csomor	Hungary	1:03:18	2:31	5:29:10	3:25	3:01:25
