= Craig Alexander (triathlete) =

Australian triathlete

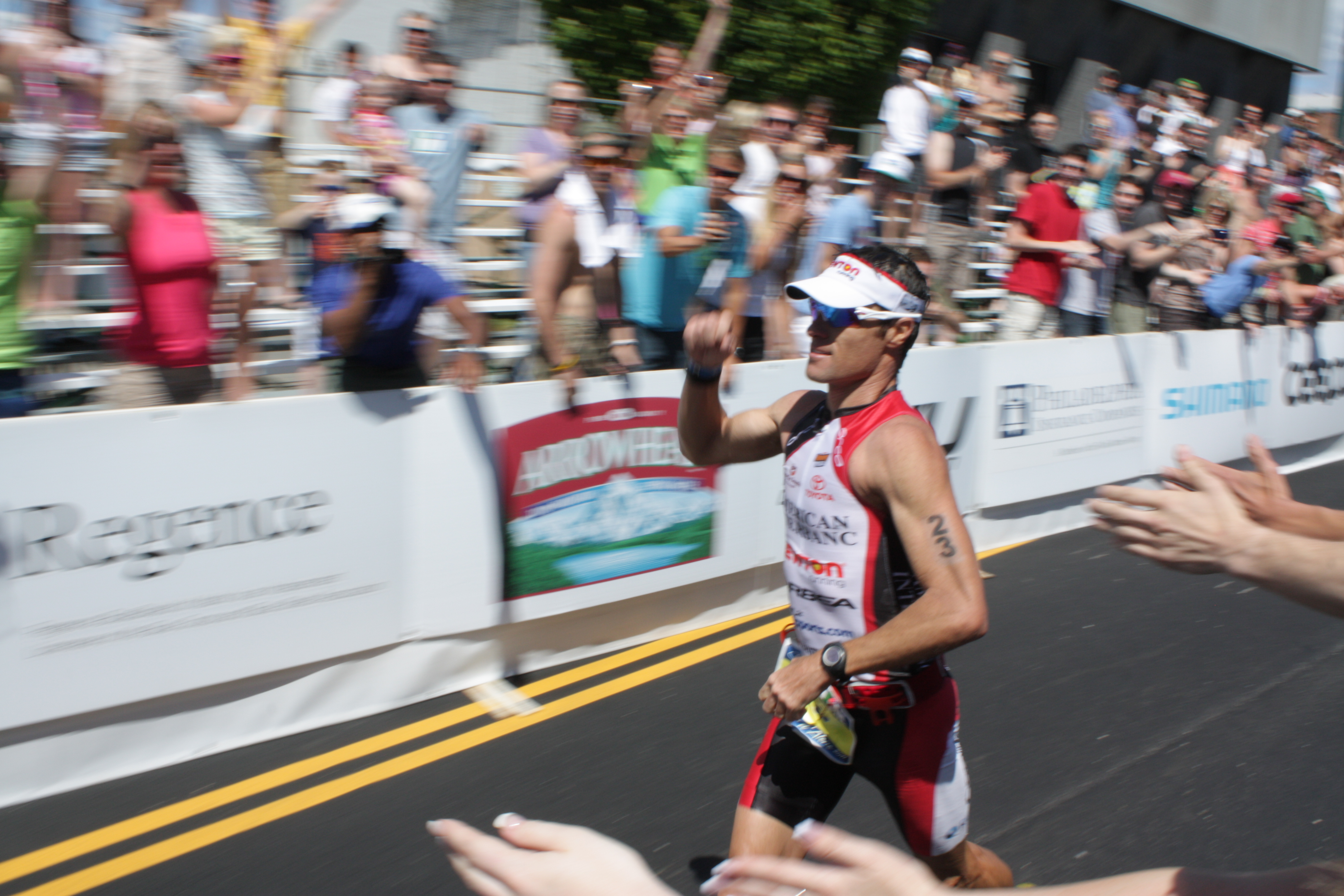

Personal information
- Nickname: Crowie
- Born: 22 June 1973 (age 53)
- Height: 1.80 m (5 ft 11 in)
- Weight: 68 kg (150 lb)
- Spouse: Nerida "Neri" Alexander(1999 – present)
- Website: www.craigalexander.net

Sport
- Country: Australia
- Sport: Triathlon
Medal record
Representing Australia
Men's triathlon
ITU Long Distance World Championships
| Silver medal – second place | 2006 Canberra | Elite |
Ironman World Championship
| Gold medal – first place | 2011 | Individual |
| Gold medal – first place | 2009 | Individual |
| Gold medal – first place | 2008 | Individual |
| Silver medal – second place | 2007 | Individual |
Ironman 70.3 World Championship
| Silver medal – second place | 2012 Las Vegas | Individual |
| Gold medal – first place | 2011 Las Vegas | Individual |
| Gold medal – first place | 2006 Clearwater | Individual |
ITU Aquathlon World Championships
| Bronze medal – third place | 1998 | Individual |

Craig Alexander (born 22 June 1973) is an Australian triathlete who is the 2008, 2009 & 2011 Ironman Triathlon World Champion. He was the course record holder for the Ironman World Championship. He is also the winner of the Ironman 70.3 World Championship in 2006 and 2011.

== Triathlon career ==
=== Early career ===
In December 1993, Alexander raced in his first triathlon at Kurnell in Southern Sydney.

Alexander split his time between Olympic Distance and Half Iron distance racing early in his career, winning a total of 20 races in his first 4 years as a professional triathlete.

=== Ironman career ===
After a long, unbeaten streak at the Half Ironman distance, Crowie won the inaugural Ironman 70.3 (Half Ironman) World Championship in 2006. This win qualified him for the Ironman World Championships in Hawaii the following year (2007), where he finished 2nd in his debut race in the lava fields.

In 2008 and 2009, Alexander went on to win the Ironman World Championships, becoming only the 4th male athlete in history to defend the title.

Crowie then followed this up in 2011 by winning the Ironman 70.3 World Championships for the second time and the Ironman World Championships for the third time (the first athlete in history to win both titles in the same year).

With his 2011 victory in Hawaii, Alexander also broke the previous course record which had stood for 15 years and became, at the age of 38, the oldest athlete ever to win the IM World Championship title.

=== Coaching career ===
In 2014, Crowie stepped away from Ironman racing and launched his own brand, Sansego. He teamed up with an elite group of endurance coaches and experts to deliver coaching, consulting, clinics and training camps.

== Personal life ==
Alexander attended Ashfield Boys High School and went on to study Anatomy and Physiology at university.
