= Samantha McGlone =

Canadian triathlete

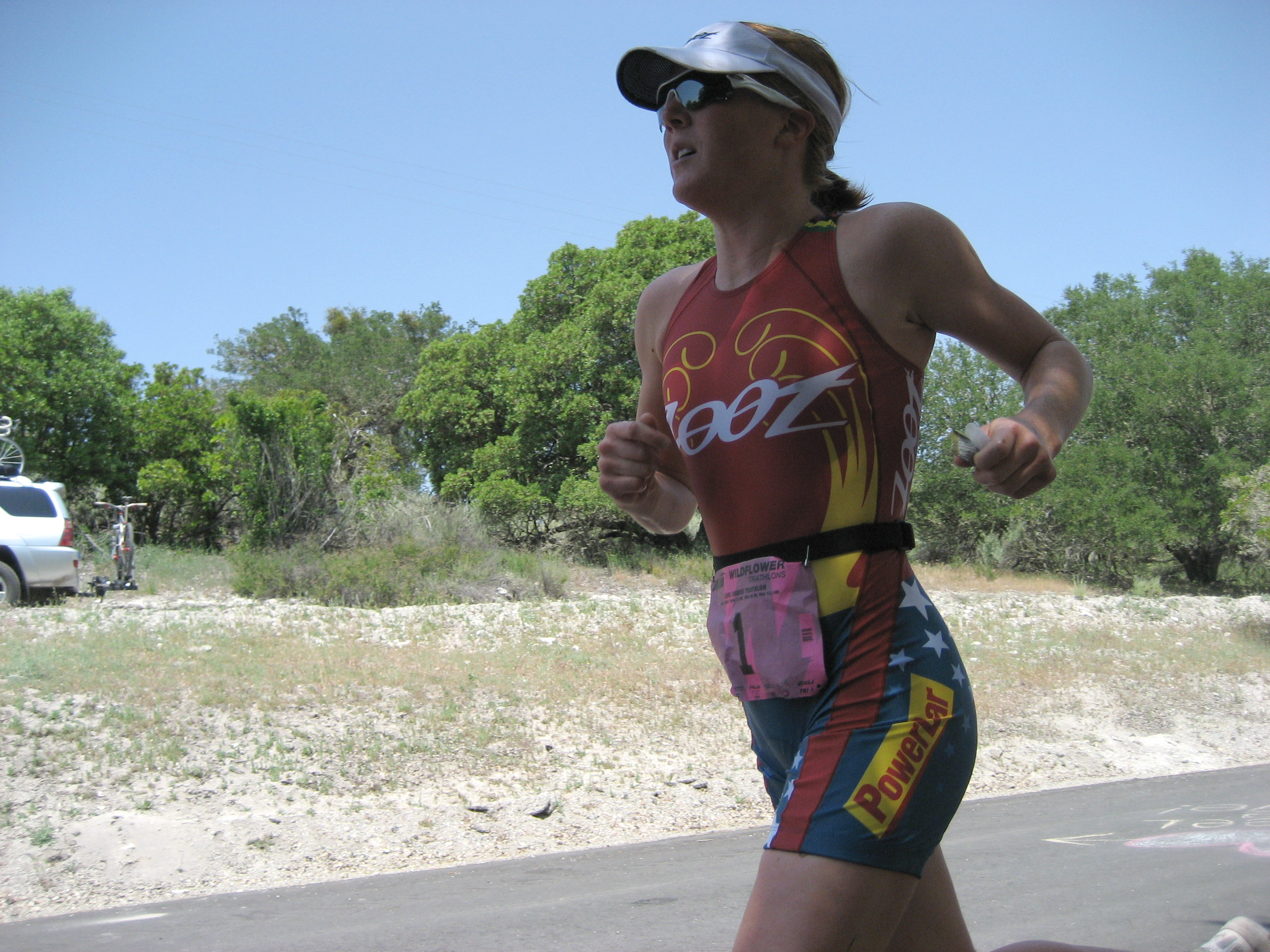

Medal record

Representing Canada

Women's Triathlon

Ironman World Championship
Silver medal – second place	2007	Individual

Ironman World Championship 70.3
Gold medal – first place	2006	Individual
Silver medal – second place	2007	Individual

Samantha McGlone (born July 19, 1979 in St. Catharines, Ontario) is a Canadian triathlete.

McGlone competed at the second Olympic triathlon at the 2004 Summer Olympics. She took twenty-seventh place with a total time of 2:10:14.24. McGlone won the Canadian National Triathlon championship in both 2004 and 2005.

Also among her titles, McGlone won the Wildflower Triathlon crown in 2005, via 4:32:59. On November 11, 2006, McGlone won the Ironman 70.3 World Championship with a time of 4:12:58, and qualified for the full Ironman World Championship 2007 in Kona, Hawaii. On October 13, 2007, she came in second place at the Kona Ironman with a time of 9:14:04.
