= Erika Csomor =

Hungarian triathlete and duathlete

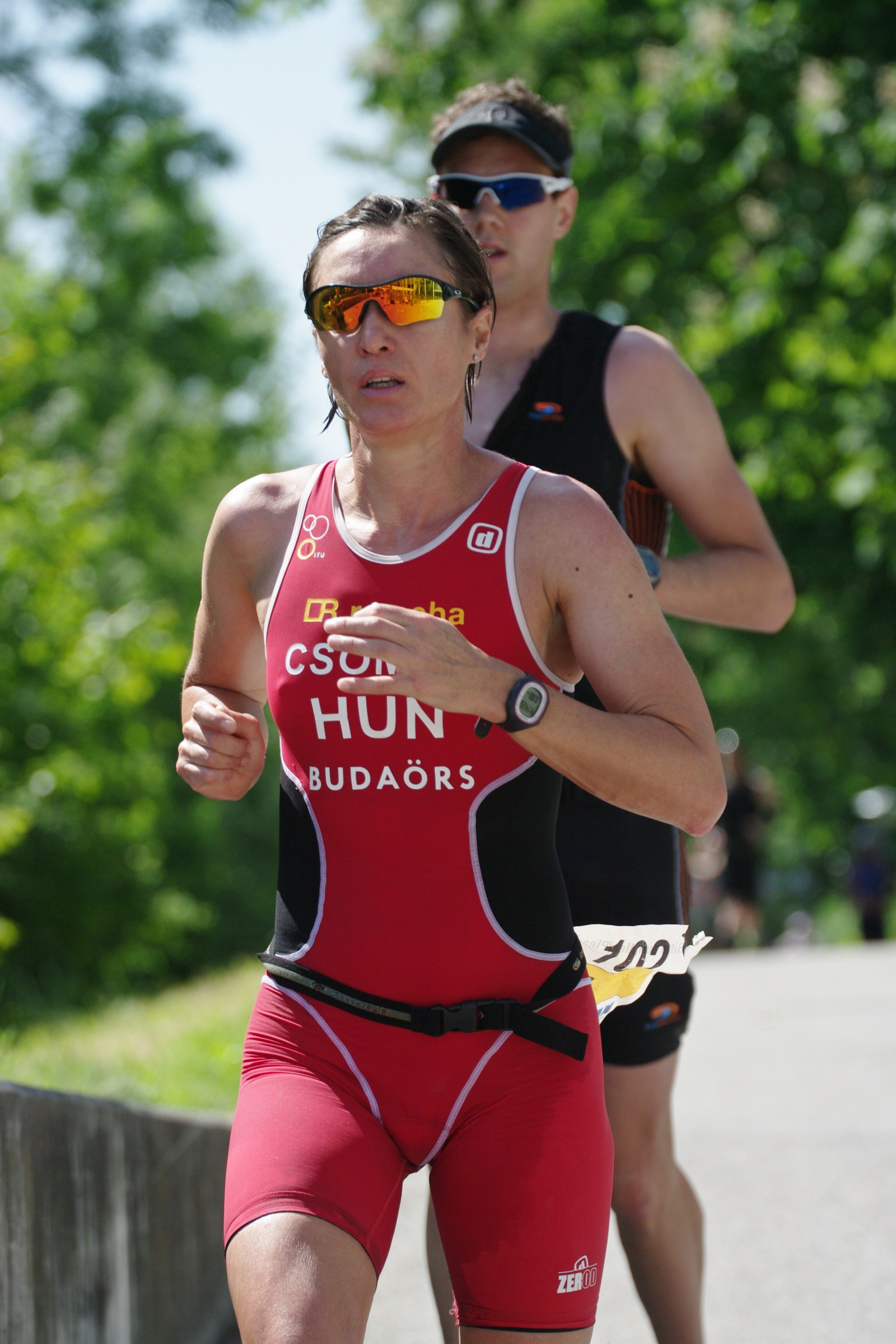
- Erika Csomor competing in 2012 at Ironman 70.3 Austria

Personal information
- Born: 8 November 1973 (age 52) Cegléd, Hungary
- Height: 1.70 m (5 ft 7 in)
- Weight: 54 kg (119 lb)

Sport
- Country: Hungary
- Team: teamTBB
- Coached by: Brett Sutton

Achievements and titles
- Personal best(s): Running 5,000 m - 16:01; Running 10,000 m - 33:20; Half Marathon - 1:12:05; Marathon - 2:39:59; Ironman - 8:47:05
Medal record
Representing Hungary
Women's triathlon
ITU Long Distance World Championships
Silver medal – second place	2007 Lorient	Individual
Women's Duathlon
ITU Duathlon Long Distance World Championships
Silver medal – second place	2001	Individual
Bronze medal – third place	2004	Individual
ITU Duathlon World Championships
Gold medal – first place	2001 Italy	Individual
Gold medal – first place	2002 United States	Individual
Gold medal – first place	2004 Geel	Individual

Erika Csomor (born 8 November 1973, Cegléd) is a Hungarian triathlete and duathlete. In 1998 she ran the marathon race at the European Championships, ending up in 36th place with a total time of 2:48:37.

In 2001, she won the silver medal at the Duathlon Long Distance World Championships. In that same year she became World Champion in the ITU Duathlon World Championships held in Italy. In 2002, she was unable to successfully defend her title, but still managed to take the silver.

Two years later at the 2004 ITU Duathlon World Championships in Geel, Belgium she became World Champion for the second time in her career. Also in 2004 she would win the bronze medal at the Duathlon Long Distance World Championships in Denmark. She won the silver medal at the 2007 Triathlon Long Distance World Championships in Lorient behind Leanda Cave.

On 29 March 2008, she won the Ford Ironman 70.3 California with a time of 4:23:07 (unofficial), beating 2006 Ironman Hawaii champion Michellie Jones and 2006 Ironman 70.3 champion Samantha McGlone. On 13 July 2008 she came second in the ironman-distance Quelle Challenge Roth, in a time of 8:47:05, beating Paula Newby-Fraser's world record time of 8:50:53 set in 1994, but behind Yvonne van Vlerken's winning time of 8:45:48.
