= Ironman Germany =

Triathlon race held in Frankfurt, Germany

The Ironman Germany is a triathlon race, part of the Ironman series. It is owned and organized by the World Triathlon Corporation (WTC). In 2005, Frankfurt became the new site of the Ironman European Championship.

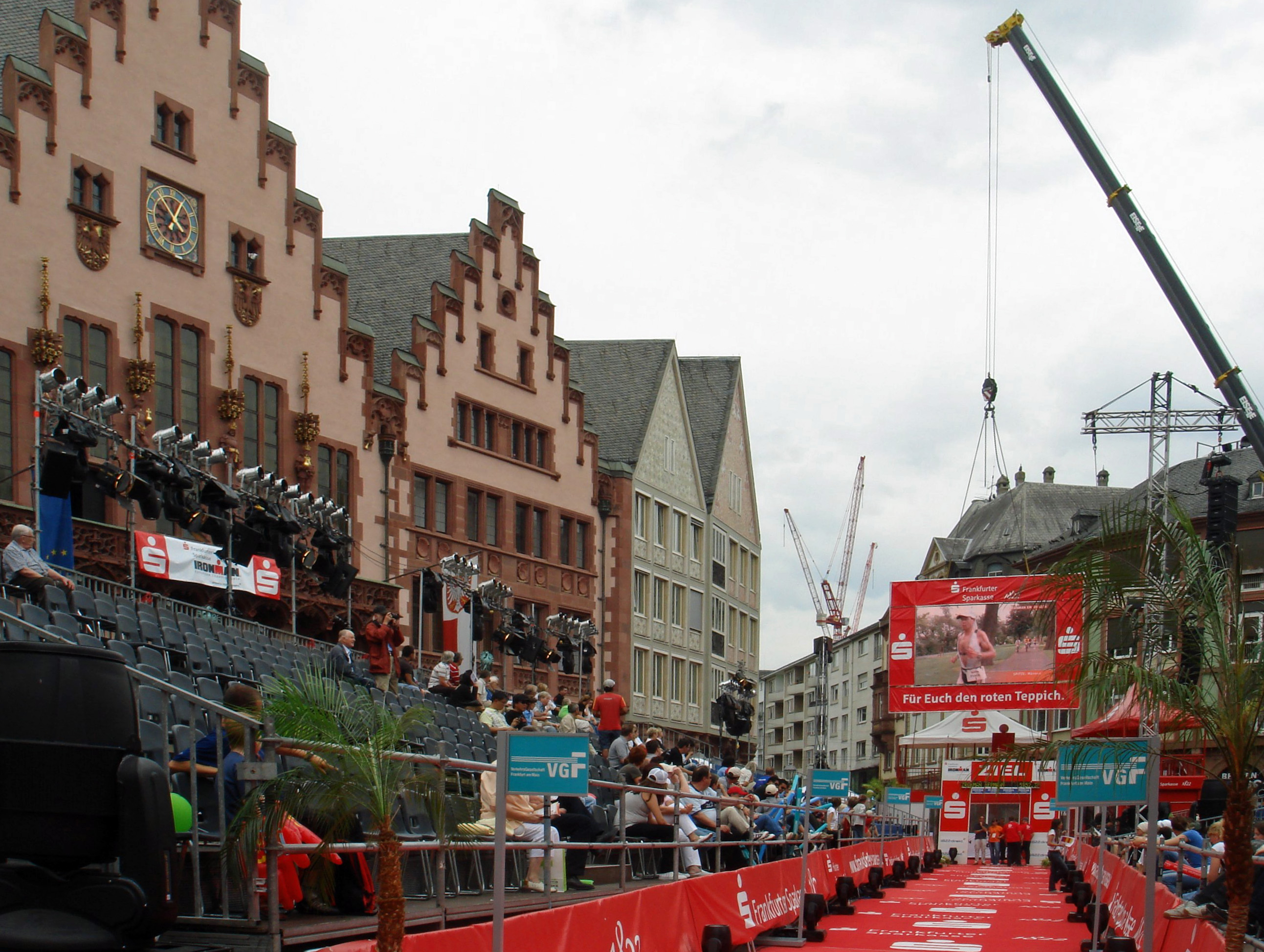
The finish line of the 2007 Ironman European Championship in Frankfurt

== History ==
The first Ironman race in Germany was held in Roth in 1988. The race began with the swimming portion (3.8 kilometers) in the Main-Danube Canal, part of the Rhine river. Before the race, samples of the water are collected and tested to make sure it is safe to compete in. On race day, the Shipping Authority closes off the river for the day in order to keep the athletes safe from ships and pollution. After the swimming portion is finished, athletes change into their cycling attire and begin the 180 kilometer ride, 8 kilometers south of Roth. The ride goes down to Greding, where they turn and finish back at Roth. After the cycling portion is finished, athletes change into their running attire and begin the 40 kilometer run to the finish. In 2001, the WTC ended its Ironman contract with Roth. The annual triathlon still goes on but it is no longer part of the Ironman series.

== European Championship ==
Since 2005, the Ironman European Championship is held annually in Frankfurt and more than half a million spectators gather to watch the race every year. The race starts in two different waves, the first wave consists of 100 elite level athletes and the second start consists of the remaining athletes. An average of 2500 people compete per year. The first part of the race, the 3.86 km swim event, takes place in the lake Langener Waldsee about 15 km south of Frankfurt. The subsequent 180 km bike course first goes to central Frankfurt, then through two laps through Frankfurt and the surrounding region Wetterau. Northernmost point of the route is in Bad Nauheim. The final marathon running goes four laps on a course on both sides on the River Main in Frankfurt. The finish is at the Römerberg square in the historic center of Frankfurt. In 2010 the maximum time was reduced from 16 to 15 hours, in spite of a 5 km extended cycling course.

== Present Day ==
In 2003, the WTC decided to hold their annual race in Frankfurt creating the Opel Ironman Germany Triathlon. Stefan Holzner, from Germany, won with a time of 8:12:29.1 and Nina Kraft, also from Germany, won for the women with a time of 9:03:11.5. In its ten-year span, the record has been broken numerous times. In 2008, Chrissie Wellington, from England broke the record for the women with a time of 8:51:24.7 and in 2009 Timo Bracht, from Germany, with a time of 7:59:15. In 2005, the Ironman European Championship was brought to Frankfurt. As of 2018, the course record for men is 7:41:42, set by the Sebastian Kienle from Germany in 2017, and for women is 8:38:44, set by Daniela Ryf from Switzerland in 2018. The championship is an annual accumulation of the best athletes from all around Europe. In order to race in the championship, one of four qualifications must be met.

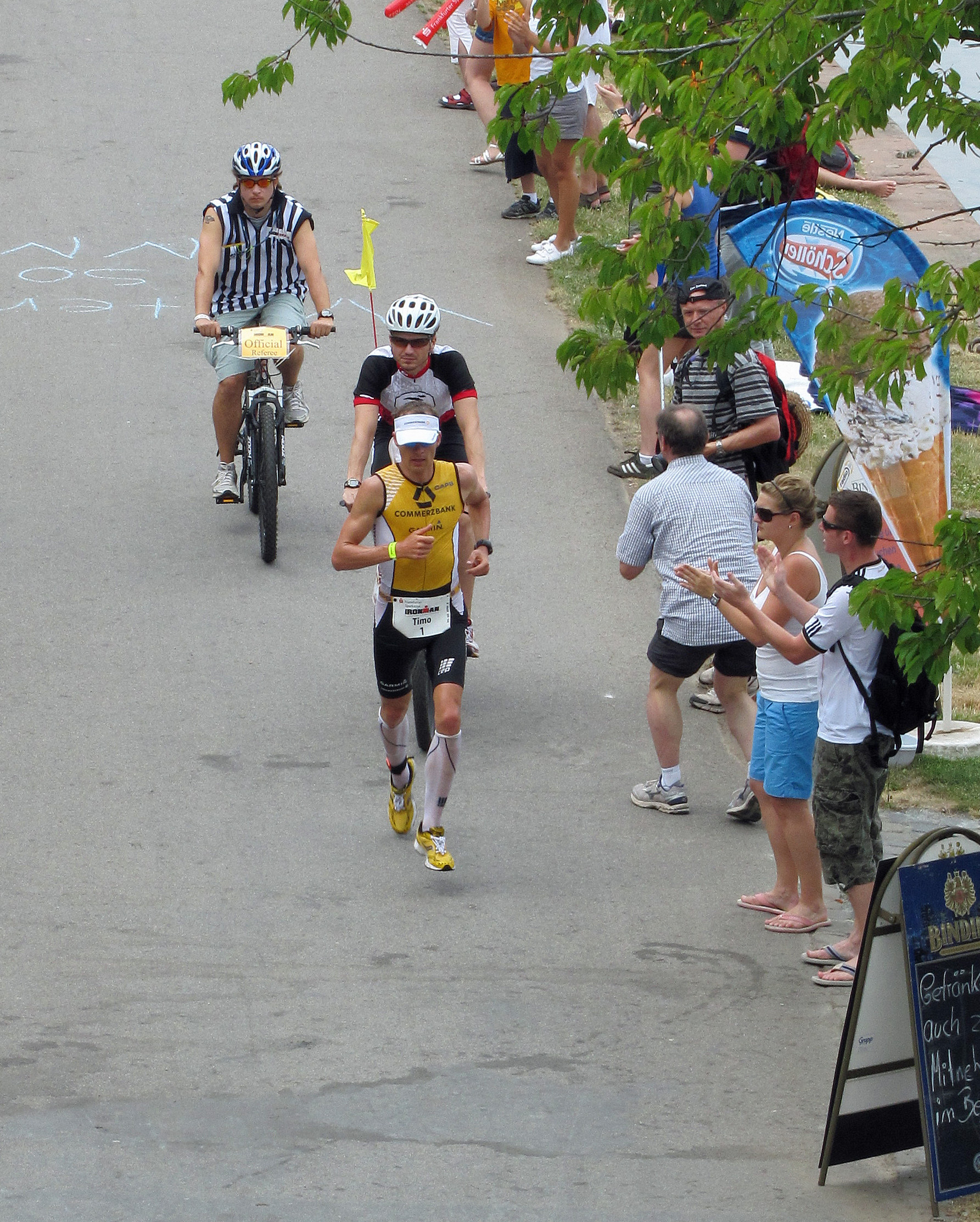
Timo Bracht running in the 2008 European Championship

=== Lottery ===
The Ironman lottery system was designed in 1983 by Ironman Cofounder John Collins. His idea was to give all athletes the chance to compete in this monumental race. The lottery system now accepts 100 athletes from all different age groups and 5 physically challenged athletes. If selected, completion of an Ironman series race is required one year prior to the championship race.

=== Ironman Ebay Auction ===
In 2002, the Ironman Auction allowed people to bid on six spots in the championship race. Each week one slot is posted with a starting bid of $10,000. Over the past 11 years, the auction has raised over $2 million. One hundred percent of the proceeds go to different charities and organizations supported by the Ironman Foundation. The charities supported by the Ironman Foundation are both national and international. Some of the charities include: American Red Cross, American Heart Association, Big Brothers and Big Sisters, Boys and Girls Club, World Bicycle Relief, Peoples Advocacy for Trails in Hawaii and The County of Hawaii Parks & Recreation Department.

=== Finishing position ===
The top finishing males and females are given a spot in the championship race. In order to accept the championship invitation the athlete must be present at the awards ceremony. Many of the top finishers believe that they already qualified or someone else is handling their invitation but that is not always the case. WTC managing director of global race operations Steve Meckfessel says "just cracking the top 10 can sometimes punch the ticket". When people are absent, the next available spot is given to the next finisher in the age group. This is known as rolldown.

=== The Ironman Legacy Program ===
The Ironman Legacy Program is another lottery system that accepts 100 athletes. A number of criteria must be met to qualify for this program. First, completion of at least twelve Ironman series races before the actual championship race is required. Second, have never participated in the Championship race. Third, must have completed an Ironman race in each of the two years prior to the Championship. And finally, be registered to compete in an Ironman race later in that year.

== Controversy ==
The World Anti-Doping Agency conducted a study to see if athletes were doping. They surveyed 2997 athletes that have participated in triathlons in Germany, including the Ironman European Championship. The survey consisted of both physical and cognitive doping. Physical doping is taking any illegal substance to improve your race performance and cognitive doping is taking any illegal or legal substance to improve your mental health. The survey found that 13% physically doped, 15% cognitively doped, and 20% used both.
