= Sibylle Matter =

Swiss triathlete and physician

Sibylle Matter (born 2 September 1973 in Hergiswil, lives in Plaffeien) is an athlete from Switzerland and physician. She competes in triathlon.

Matter competed at the first Olympic triathlon at the 2000 Summer Olympics. She took thirty-sixth place with a total time of 2:13:25.38.
