= Wildflower Triathlon =

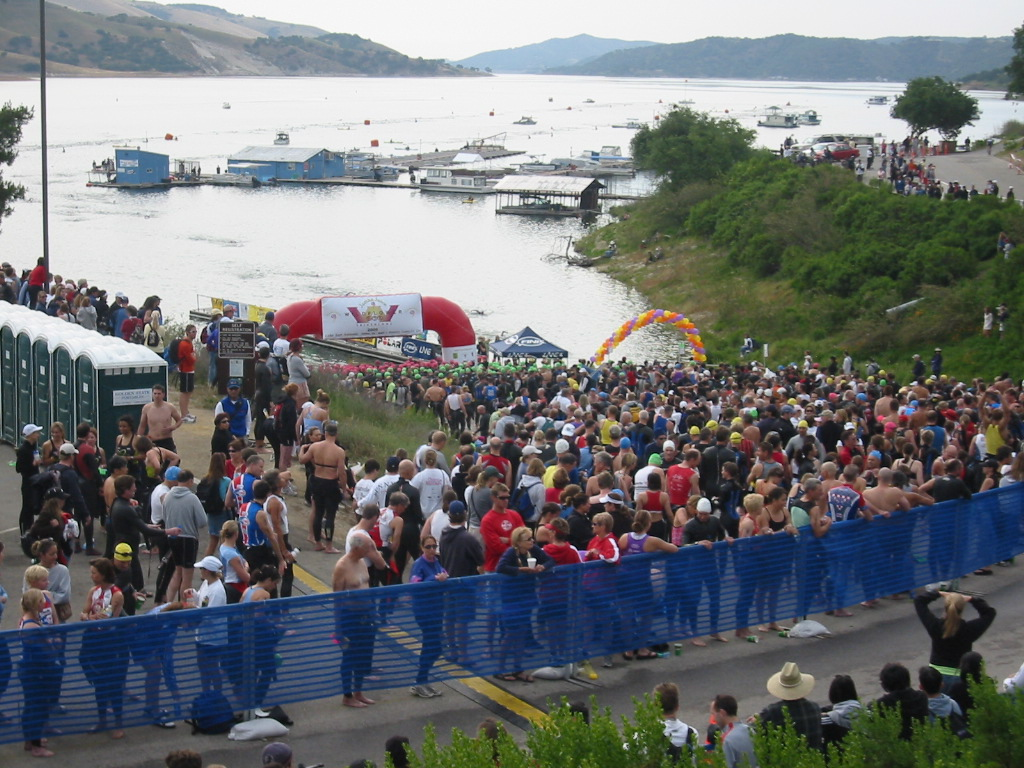
Olympic race swimmers starting at Wildflower 2005

The Wildflower Triathlon was a triathlon (swim-bike-run race) held at Lake San Antonio in Central California from 1983 to 2019, the first winner being Dean "The Machine" Harper. It was held the first weekend in May each year.

The original course was expanded to the standardized half-Ironman distance (1.2 mi / 56 mi / 13.1 mi) in the late 1980s, and was often referred to as simply the long course. Two more races were subsequently been added to the event: an Olympic-distance (1.5 km / 40 km / 10 km) race and a short or "sprint" mountain-bike triathlon (0.25 mi / 9.7 mi / 2 mi).

Known for a particularly hilly and grueling course, it was one of the largest triathlon events in the world, with 7,500 athletes and 40,000 spectators attending each year at its peak. Traditionally it was associated with a Wildflower festival, though in later years the festival had been eclipsed by the increasingly large athletic event. A drastic drop in lake level in 2014 led to a modified course and lower attendance. Shortly after the 2015 event, the Monterey County Board of Supervisors announced it would close Lake San Antonio due to low water levels. The event was canceled in 2017 and 2019. It was canceled in 2020 due to the COVID-19 pandemic. In July 2023 it was announced that a new triathlon not associated with the previous Wildflower Triathlon would be held at the site. Wildflower organizers have announced their plans to bring back the race in May 2025.

== Events ==
=== Long course ===
==== Distances ====
1.2 m Swim, 56 m Bike, 13.1 m Run

==== Swim course ====
The 1.2-mile (1.9 km) swim course began at the Lynch Ramp. The race started in waves, with the professional men, the professional women, age group men, age group women, and relay teams. Swimmers swam in a clockwise direction on a rectangular course. There were course marker buoys and lifeguards on kayaks lining the course. Swimmers exited the water, went up the ramp, through the timing area and into the transition area.

==== Bike course ====
The course was 56 miles (90 km) long and was considered relatively difficult. Triathletes left the transition area to the north and made a quick left through the finish line chute. Athletes followed the road down Shoreline Drive to the beach area and as it turned right up "Beach Hill", a steep 1-mile (1.6 km) climb. The course proceeded onto San Antonio Drive and out of the park onto Interlake Road past the first checkpoint at mile six. Bicyclists would proceed on Interlake Road over rolling hills before turning onto Jolon Road (19 miles). Triathletes would have small rolling hills along Jolon Road from mile 26 to 42. At mile 42, they followed Nacimiento left up "Nasty Grade", a nearly five-mile grade which climbs 1,000 feet (300 m) from bottom to top of "Heart Rate Hill." At the top of the hill they went back onto Interlake Road and then at the 50-mile (80 km) point made a right turn onto San Antonio Drive and headed back to the park. Finally, they descended Lynch Hill for the last descent.

==== Run course ====
The 13.1-mile (21.1 km) run course was 60% trails and 40% roads. Triathletes would depart the transition area to the southwest and climb the Lynch Ramp stairs. Once on the trail below the resort store lawn athletes crossed the bridge and proceed down the beach access road through "Beach City." At the base of "Beach Hill" athletes continued straight off of the road and on to the trails along the shoreline until the Harris Creek campgrounds. After this, they followed the paved road as it turned right past the launch ramp for a short climb up the hill. At mile 3 they turned left onto the backcountry trails. The trail followed the creek to Long Valley with two steep hills to climb out the other side at 5.7 miles (9.2 km). Triathletes proceeded back into the park alongside the road on trails and fire roads through Redondo Vista Campgrounds, the TNT campsite area, and the overflow camping area. At mile 9, the course returned to the roads, making a right turn at San Antonio Drive. Triathletes proceeded up the road and down the hill to the PowerBar turn-around point and at mile 10, then ran back up the hill and proceeded back on San Antonio Drive. Finally, athletes headed down Lynch Hill towards the finish chute and finish line.

=== Olympic Distance ===
==== Distances ====
1.5k Swim, 40k Bike, 10k Run

==== Swim course ====
The 1.5k (.93 mile) swim course began at the Lynch Ramp. There were more than 20 wave starts at 5-minute intervals beginning with collegiate men and women, age group men and women, Team in Training men and women, and relay teams. Swimmers would swim in a clockwise direction on the triangular course. The course would have sailboats, clearly marked, at the corners and there would be course marker buoys and lifeguards on long boards every 100 yards. The swimmers would exit the water, go through the timing area, up the ramp and into the transition area.

==== Bike course ====
The bike course was 40K (24.8 miles) long and was considered relatively difficult. Cyclist would leave the transition area to the north and proceed directly up "Lynch Hill." On San Antonio Drive athletes headed out of the park and onto Interlake Road. On Interlake Road, triathletes proceeded over rolling hills to the turn-around point at mile 12.4. Triathletes would return to the park on the same roads. As they re-entered the park, riders turned left and headed down Lynch Hill and back to the transition area.

==== Run course ====
The 10k (6.2 mile) run course was a combination of road and trails through campgrounds and challenging hills. Triathletes would depart the transition area to the southwest, and climb the Lynch Ramp stairs. Then they turned left on the trail below the resort store lawn. They crossed the bridge and proceeded down the beach access road through "Beach City." At the base of "Beach Hill," they continued straight off of the road and on to the trails along the shoreline. They followed the trails through Harris Creek campgrounds, and proceeded past the launch ramp parking lot and onto Lake San Antonio Drive. They turned right up San Antonio Drive and at the Beach Hill intersection triathletes left the road for trails and followed the fire access trail back to Lynch intersection. Finally, triathletes returned to the road and turned right down Lynch Hill to the finish chute and the finish line.

=== Mountain Bike Sprint Triathlon ===
==== Distances ====
0.25m Swim, 9.7m Bike, 2 mi Run.

=== Sprint Distance Triathlon ===
==== Distances ====
0.25 Swim, 20k Bike, 5k Run.

=== 5K and 10K ===
In 2018, Wildflower added trail run events at 5K and 10K distances.

=== Stand-Up Paddleboard ===
Added to the event for 2018, Wildflower featured stand-up paddleboarding events as an alternative to the original long-run, Olympic, and sprint distance events.

==== Distances ====
2 & 6 miles.

== Course closures ==
The AVIA Wildflower Triathlons Festival established course closures for each portion of the triathlon. These closures were based upon the start time of the last individual age group wave and were for the safety of participants and volunteers.

=== Cut-off times ===
==== Long course ====
- Swim: 10:10 AM (male), 10:30 AM (female) (1:05 after the start of the last individual age group wave)
- Bike: 2:25 PM (male), 2:45 PM (female) (5:20 after the start of the last individual age group wave)
- Run: 5:25 PM (male), 5:45 PM (female) (8:20 after the start of the last individual age group wave)

==== Olympic course ====
- Swim: 11:20 AM (male), 12:05 PM (female) (1:20 after the start of the last individual age group wave)
- Bike: 1:50 PM (male), 2:35 PM (female) (3:50 after the start of the last individual age group wave)
- Run: 3:20 PM (male), 4:05 PM (female) (5:20 after the start of the last individual age group wave)

==== Mountain bike course ====
There were no course closures for the mountain bike event.

== Course records ==
The current course records are held by Terenzo Bozzone and Heather Jackson. In 2006, Bozzone completed the half-Ironman distance in 3 hours, 53 minutes and 43 seconds, while Jackson posted a time of 4 hours, 26 minutes and 29 seconds in 2012.

== Corporate sponsorship ==
The triathlon is owned and operated by See & Be Productions. It was previously sponsored by Avia and was known as the "Avia Wildflower Triathlons" until 2013. Jamba Juice was also a title sponsor of the event in the early 2000's.

== See also ==
- Wildflower: The Legendary California Triathlon
