= Ironman 70.3 =

Series of long-distance triathlon races

An Ironman 70.3, also known as a Half Ironman, is one of a series of long-distance triathlon races organized by the World Triathlon Corporation (WTC). The "70.3" refers to the total distance in miles (113.0 km) covered in the race, consisting of a 1.2-mile (1.9 km) swim, a 56-mile (90 km) bike ride, and a 13.1-mile (21.1 km) run. Each distance of the swim, bike, and run segments is half the distance of that segment in an Ironman Triathlon. The Ironman 70.3 series culminates each year with a World Championship competition, for which competitors qualify during the 70.3 series in the 12 months prior to the championship race. In addition to the World Championship race, Ironman 70.3 championship competitions are also held for the European, Asia-Pacific, and Latin America regions.

The time needed by an athlete to complete a 70.3 distance event varies from race to race and can be influenced by external factors. These factors include the terrain and the total elevation gained and lost on the course, weather conditions, and course conditions. Finish times range from sub-four-hour completion times by elite-level athletes to the imposed race cutoff, which is commonly 8 hours and 30 minutes after the start time. There are also rules and regulations that must be followed by all athletes in the competition. Some of these rules particularly apply during the bike leg of the triathlon and apply to drafting. Drafting is the process of following closely behind another cyclist so they block the wind allowing another athlete to draft off of the front rider. This is strictly prohibited with rules ensuring a 12 meter gap between cyclists at all times unless a pass is being executed.

== History ==
The first Half Ironman branded race was Half Ironman UK, which was raced in 2001. However, prior to the launch of the 70.3 series in 2005, races were then known as Half Ironman before adopting the Ironman 70.3 label. The oldest half-iron-distance race, though not under the WTC umbrella at the time, is the Superfrog Triathlon, which began in 1979.

The number of qualification events within the 70.3 series has grown since its inception, growing to match the popularity of the sport and interest in the distance. Since the first year of the Ironman 70.3 Championship race in 2006 the series grew from 14 events to over 60 events in the span of seven years. The 2016 series saw 89 events worldwide, with the biggest one-year increase in the number of events coming between the 2011 and 2012 series when the number of races grew from 38 to 57.

Since 2022, Vietnam's automobile maker VinFast was the first ever naming rights partner for 2022 Ironman World Championship and 2023 Ironman 70.3 World Championship.

== World records ==
Due to the lack of course certification for half-iron distance races, there is no official world record for 70.3 events. The fastest times to complete a half-iron distance race for men and women were both set at the 2019 Ironman 70.3 Bahrain by Kristian Blummenfelt and Holly Lawrence. While these remain the fastest times for any Ironman-branded 70.3 race, they were achieved on a 53.9-mile (86.8 km) bike course, noticeably less than the standard 56-mile (90 km) course for 70.3 events.

=== Ironman 70.3 records ===
	Event	Record	Athlete	Nationality	Date	Location	Ref
Men	Ironman 70.3 Dubai	3:26:06 (22:49-0:52-1:53:28-1:02-1:07:56)	Marten Van Riel	Belgium	March 5, 2022	Dubai, United Arab Emirates	
Women	Ironman 70.3 VinFast	3:53:02 (24:45-2:07:52-1:18:05)	Taylor Knibb	United States	August 26, 2023	Lahti, Finland	

== Athletes' Choice Awards ==
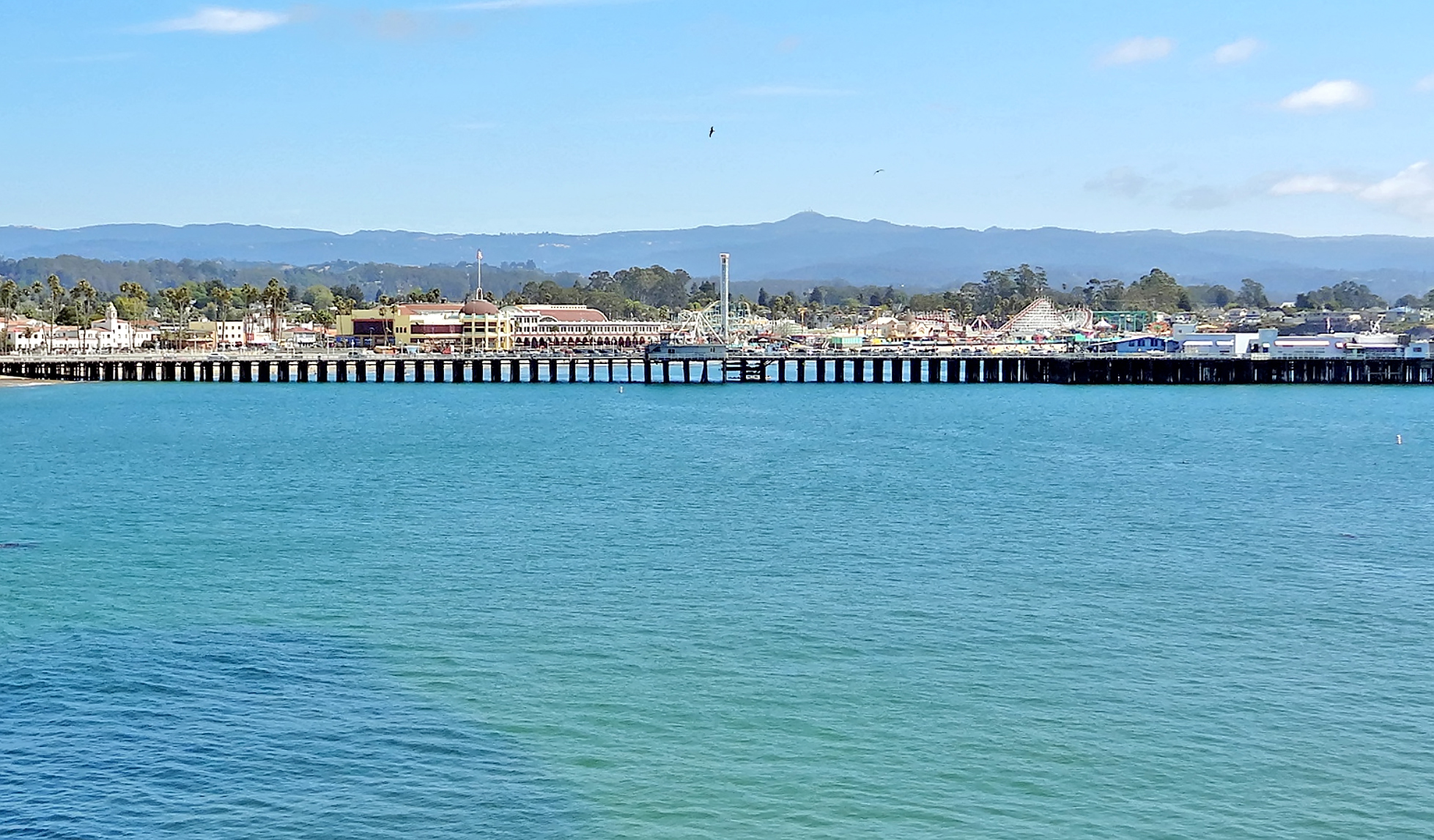
This is the location of the top swim of the 2024 Ironman 70.3 Athletes' Choice Awards. It goes along this main pier in Santa Cruz. With the BoardWalk amusement Park in the background.

The Athletes' Choice Award are awards picked by the athletes. It could also be referred to as Global Choice Award. The awards are divided between the regular Ironman and the 70.3. Now what is voted on are overall satisfaction, most recommended, best swim, best bike, and best run.

2024 Ironman 70.3 Athletes’ Choice Awards

Position	Overall Satisfaction	Most Recommended	Best Swim	Best Bike	Best Run
=== 1 ===	Musselman (Geneva, NY)	Bangsaen Thailand	Santa Cruz	Musselman	Coeur d'Alene
=== 2 ===	Nice	Rio de Janeiro	Aracaju Sergipe	Elsinore	Emilia Romagna
=== 3 ===	Vichy	Michigan	Panama	Santa Cruz	Oregon
=== 4 ===	Aix en Provence	Aracaju Sergipe	Langkawi	Michigan	Punta del Este
=== 5 ===	Rio de Janeiro	San Juan	Washington Tri Cities	Bangsaen Thailand	North Carolina
