= Blais =

Blais is a surname, and may refer to:

- André Blais (born 1947), Canadian political scientist
- André-Albert Blais (1842–1919), Canadian Roman Catholic priest and Bishop of Rimouski
- Aristide Blais (1875–1964), Canadian physician and senator
- Chris Blais (born 1981), US rally racing rider
- Craig Blais (born 1978), US educator, author, poet
- Dean Blais (born 1951), US ice hockey coach
- Dominique Blais (fl. 1990s–present), Canadian musician
- François Blais (Member of Parliament) (1875–1949), Canadian politician
- François Blais (MNA) (fl. 2010s–present), Canadian politician
- François Blais (writer) (1973–2022), Canadian writer
- Giorgio Blais (1935-2026), Italian general
- Haley Blais, Canadian singer-songwriter
- Isabelle Blais (born 1975), Canadian actress and singer
- Jean-Jacques Blais (born 1940), former Canadian politician
- Jean-Pierre Blais (born ca. 1960), Canadian public servant
- Joline Blais (b. 1960), US educator, author
- Jon Blais (1971–2007), US triathlete
- Louis Blais (1755–1838), Canadian farmer and political figure
- Louis-Henri Blais (1827–1899), Quebec lawyer and political figure
- Madeleine Blais (born 1946), US educator, journalist, author
- Marguerite Blais (born 1950), Quebec politician, journalist and radio host
- Marie-Claire Blais (1939–2021), Canadian author and playwright
- Marie-Claude Blais (fl. 2010s–present), Canadian politician
- Michel Blais (ca. 1711–1783), Canadian-born militia captain in American Revolution
- Narcisse Blais (1812–1888), Quebec farmer and political figure
- Peter Blais (born 1949), Canadian actor
- Pierre Blais (born 1948), Canadian jurist and politician
- Raynald Blais (1954–2023), Canadian politician
- Richard Blais (born 1972), US chef
- Roger Blais (geological engineer) (1926–2009), Canadian geological engineer and academic
- Sammy Blais (born 1996), Canadian ice hockey player
- Stephen Blais (born 1980), Ottawa City Council member
- Suzanne Blais-Grenier (fl. 1980s), Canadian politician
- Tim Blais, Canadian science communicator on YouTube
- Yves Blais (1931–1998), Canadian politician

== See also ==
- Blaise (name)
- Blays
- Bleys
- Blai
