= Chrissie Wellington =

English triathlete

Chrissie Wellington OBE
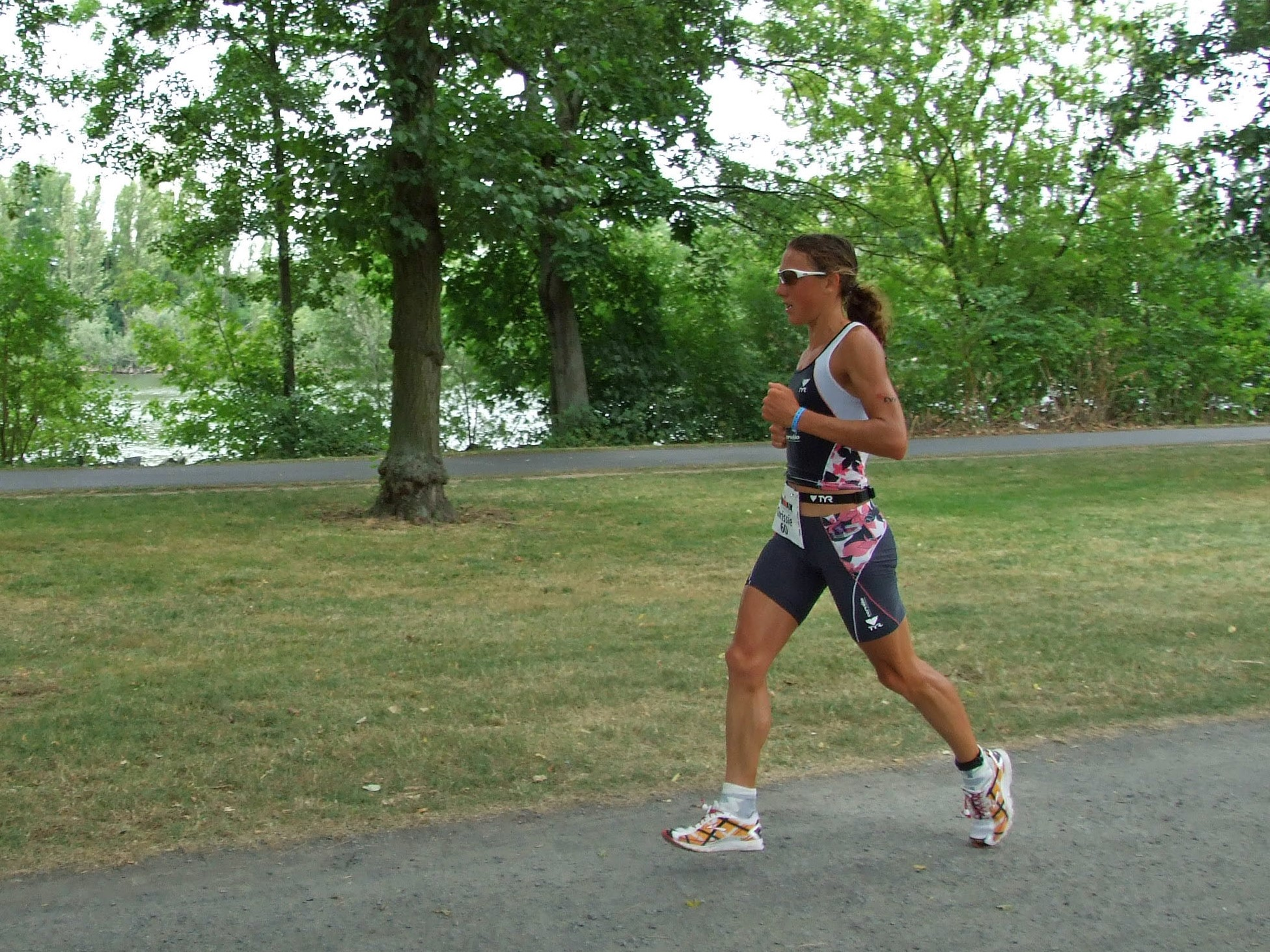
- Wellington winning the 2008 Frankfurt Ironman

Personal information
- Nicknames: Muppet; The Chrissinator
- Born: 18 February 1977 (age 49) Bury St Edmunds, Suffolk, England
- Education: University of Birmingham; University of Manchester
- Agent: Lizzie Chapman, Wasserman Media Group
- Height: 1.70 m (5 ft 7 in)
- Weight: 60 kg (132 lb)
- Spouse: Tome Lowe (m. 2015)
- Children: 1 daughter
- Other interests: International development; Gender equality
- Website: www.chrissiewellington.org

Sport
- Country: UK
- Team: teamTBB (2007–2008)
- Turned pro: February 2007
- Coached by: Frank Horwill (2002–2004); Tim Weeks (2006); Brett Sutton (2007–2008); Simon Lessing (2009); self-coached (2009); Dave Scott (2009–2011)
- Retired: January 2012
Medal record
Women's triathlon
Ironman Triathlon World Championships
Gold medal – first place	2011 Kailua-Kona	Elite
Gold medal – first place	2009 Kailua-Kona	Elite
Gold medal – first place	2008 Kailua-Kona	Elite
Gold medal – first place	2007 Kailua-Kona	Elite
ITU Long Distance World Championships
Gold medal – first place	2008 Almere	Individual
ITU Age Group World Championships
Gold medal – first place	2006 Lausanne	Individual

Christine Ann Wellington OBE (born 18 February 1977) is an English former professional triathlete and four-time Ironman Triathlon World Champion. She held both world and championship records relating to ironman-distance triathlon races: firstly the overall world record and secondly the Ironman World Championship course record (from 2009 until Mirinda Carfrae lowered it in 2013).

She won the Ironman World Championship in three consecutive years (2007–2009), but did not start the 2010 Ironman World Championship race because of illness. Then – while suffering from injuries so severe that her former coach Brett Sutton said she should "not even be on the start line" – she regained the title in 2011. She was the first British athlete to win the Ironman Triathlon World Championship, and remained undefeated in all thirteen of her races over the ironman distance. She is the only triathlete, male or female, to have won the World Championship less than a year after turning professional, an achievement described by the British Triathlon Federation as "a remarkable feat, deemed to be a near impossible task for any athlete racing as a rookie at their first Ironman World Championships."

She lowered the world record on all three occasions (2009–2011) she raced Challenge Roth at Roth in Bavaria, Germany. Her record of 8 hours 18 minutes 13 seconds was more than 32 minutes faster than the record set by Yvonne van Vlerken in 2008. Following her 2010 world record, her former coach Brett Sutton described Wellington as "a person of true international sporting excellence who is overshadowed by noone in any other sport." Her record stood for 12 years until Daniela Ryf set a time of 8 hours 8 minutes 21 seconds in 2023.

Paula Newby-Fraser's course record at the Ironman World Championships had stood for 17 years until Wellington broke it in 2009. At the time of her retirement, Wellington held the four fastest times ever recorded by a woman over the ironman distance, and had the greatest number of sub-9 hour times – nine. In addition to the Ironman titles, she was also the 2006 International Triathlon Union (ITU) Age Group World Champion and the 2008 ITU long-distance World Champion.

Before becoming a professional triathlete, Wellington worked for the British government as an adviser on international development and, for Rural Reconstruction Nepal, on development projects in Nepal. International development remains one of her passions. She is actively involved in supporting charities relating to international development and supporting and encouraging women and girls to take up sport.

After meeting the parents of Jon Blais at her first world championship, she became an ambassador for the Blazeman Foundation, performing a "Blazeman roll" in his memory at the finish line of all her triathlon races since then. She campaigns for full equality of women in prize money, sponsorship, and media reporting of sport, and equal opportunities, notably in cycling, for women to be able to compete on the same terms, and over the same race distances, as men. She was a founding member of Le Tour Entier, which campaigned for a Women's Tour de France and improvements to women's cycling generally.

== Early life ==
Christine Wellington was born in Bury St Edmunds, Suffolk and grew up in Feltwell, a small village in Norfolk. She was a competitive swimmer as a teenager, when she swam for Thetford Dolphins, and went on to swim for her university. She describes herself as a "sporty kid, swimming, playing hockey, running, but never excelling and always more interested in the social side of the sports scene". She was educated at her local comprehensive school, Downham Market High School and Sixth Form, where she was a member of most school sports teams, but "focused more on my studies than I did on reaching my full potential on the pitch."

== Career ==
After graduating with first-class honours in geography from Birmingham University in 1998, Wellington travelled the world for two years, which she described as opening her eyes to the "many problems that exist in the world, but also to the opportunity for positive change." In 2000, supported by a £10,000 scholarship from the Economic and Social Research Council, she enrolled in an MA course in development studies at the University of Manchester. Graduating with a Distinction in October 2001, she joined the UK government agency DEFRA in London to work on international development policy. At DEFRA, she was part of the team that negotiated for the UK at the World Summit on Sustainable Development, and became involved in following up the UK government's commitments on water and sanitation. She also worked on post-conflict environmental reconstruction policy.

Disillusioned with "bureaucracy and paper pushing", in September 2004 Wellington took sabbatical leave from DEFRA to work in Nepal for Rural Reconstruction Nepal (RRN), a Nepalese development NGO. Based in the capital, Kathmandu, she managed a community-led total sanitation scheme in Salyan, a conflict-affected district in the west of the country. She also performed many other tasks for RRN, including preparing project proposals, editing books and writing papers.

On leaving Nepal at the end of 2005, she travelled to New Zealand, Tasmania and Argentina before returning to her old job at DEFRA in May 2006. She left this job in February 2007 in order to become a professional triathlete.

== Triathlon career (amateur) ==
Wellington's first triathlon race was at the Eton Super Sprints on 16 May 2004, where she finished third. In the following two months, she won this race on both occasions. In July and August she sampled two longer (Olympic distance) triathlons: the Milton Keynes Triathlon and the Bedford Triathlon, finishing fourth and third respectively. In August, she won the mixed team British triathlon sprint-distance relay championship in Nottingham.

She had to put her triathlon racing on hold for her sabbatical in Nepal, where she was based in Kathmandu, at an altitude of 1350 m (4430 ft). Every morning before work she would cycle around the neighbouring countryside on her mountain bike, with a group of foreign and Nepali cyclists known as the "Mongolian Cycling Team". She would also go running along the many hilly trails in the Kathmandu Valley. When riding around the outlying villages on her mountain bike she would often have to wait for male co-workers to catch up with her. During a religious holiday, she spent two weeks cycling with friends some 1400 km from Lhasa, the capital of Tibet to Kathmandu, crossing mountain passes over 5000 m, enduring sandstorms and blizzards, and reaching Base Camp on the northern (Tibetan) side of Mount Everest at 5208 m (17090 ft). Her coach, Brett Sutton, believes this experience to have been very useful altitude training for her later professional career, while Wellington herself regards it as having given her lasting mental strength.

Her friends in Nepal remarked on how she never missed a morning bike ride, whether or not she was sick: "Chrissie saying, 'Oh, I have a stomach bug' was like saying hello every day, but no matter how many bugs were inside her tummy she would always train and push herself every second", said one friend, adding, "We all wondered how fast she would be if she had no bugs – and that thought was scary."

In February 2006 she entered the Coast to Coast, a 243 km, two-day endurance race across the Southern Alps of New Zealand involving running, cycling and kayaking. She finished 2nd in this race, despite having no previous kayaking experience, apart from some brief training before the race.

Shortly after her return to the UK she won the 2006 Shropshire Olympic Triathlon. This qualified her to enter the ITU World Age Group (Amateur) Championships in Lausanne, Switzerland, a title which she won on 2 September 2006, beating her nearest rival by 4 minutes and 2 seconds. She later said she "trained really hard for this race for 10 weeks, juggling 20 hours [a week] of training with my full-time job."

During this period, like most amateur triathletes, she had also continued entering running races. She had previously run the London Marathon for charity in 2002, finishing in 3:08:17, making her the fastest woman from her running club in that race. That result prompted her to get a running coach, Frank Horwill – whom she regarded as "legendary and ever inspiring" – and to take her running training much more seriously. She had hoped to improve her marathon time in the April 2003 London Marathon, but in March she collided with a car while riding her commuter bike in Clapham. The accident resulted in a haematoma in her left thigh, causing – in an example of myositis ossificans – a 5 cm spur of bone to grow from her femur. Unable to run the marathon, she took up swimming again, leading her to try triathlon racing in 2004. After her ITU victory, she took up cross-country racing for the first time, as a means of building strength for her triathlon races. She enjoyed some success in B and C grade cross-country events around London, winning several races including the South of Thames Championship in December 2006.

== Triathlon career (professional) ==
=== 2007–2008: life with teamTBB under Brett Sutton ===
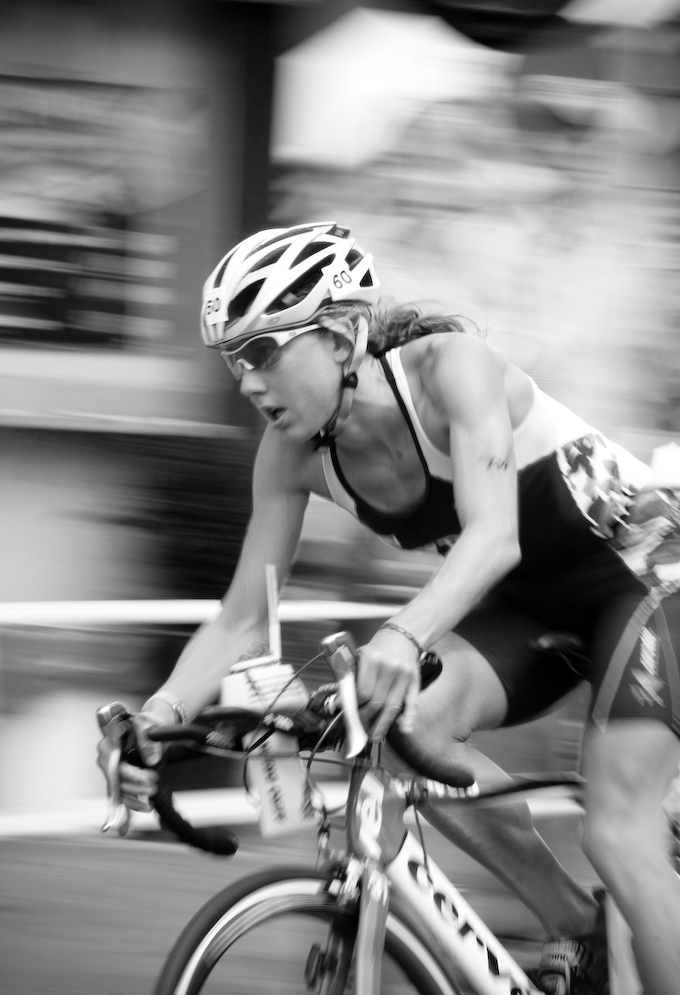
Chrissie Wellington competing at the 2008 Frankfurt Ironman

After winning the world amateur title, Wellington began to consider taking the risk of giving up her job in order to become a professional triathlete. In January 2007, on the recommendation of a friend, she travelled to Switzerland to ask the opinion of the Australian triathlon coach, Brett Sutton. Within 5 days she had handed in her notice at DEFRA, and in February flew out to Thailand to join Sutton's teamTBB at their base in Phuket.

She turned professional with the intention of racing standard-distance events, and enjoyed early success, winning Olympic-distance events in Bangkok and Subic Bay, then returned to the UK where she won the sprint-distance event at Bleinheim. Later the same month she entered her first longer-distance event, the UK half-Ironman race at Wimbleball, but suffered mechanical problems with her bicycle (forcing her to climb the steep Exmoor hills in too high a gear) and finished in 5th place. She returned to winning form only six days later, at the shorter Zürich triathlon.

On 1 August 2007, Wellington took on her toughest challenge to date, the long-distance Alpe d'Huez Triathlon, known for its difficult summer heat, its altitude, and its hard climbs on both the bike and running stages. Despite a puncture and being forced off the road by an oncoming vehicle during a fast descent, she finished the bike stage 19 mins 30 sec in front of her nearest rival, Sione Jongstra, and extended her lead on the running stage to win the race by over 29 minutes, in 9th place overall.

Towards the end of July, her coach had suggested that she was ready for an Ironman, despite the relatively low volume of her training. She said of Sutton, "my training was more geared to standard distance, with not much high volume. I don't seem to need high-volume work like three-hour runs. I've done none of these since I've been with Brett. Some of the other girls will. This is why he is so special: he has an ability to spot potential even if the athlete can't. He said I was ready even on the training I was doing."

After 10 days of acclimatisation at her team's base in Thailand, Wellington won Ironman Korea, in very hot conditions, finishing over 50 minutes ahead of 2nd placed Yasuko Miyazaki, in 7th place overall. By winning this race, she earned a slot to race at the Ironman world championships in Hawaii.

==== First Ironman world championship win ====
On 13 October 2007 (14 October UTC), Wellington won the Ironman world championship title at Kailua-Kona, Hawaii, together with US$110,000 prize money. She finished in 9:08:45, five minutes ahead of Samantha McGlone, running the marathon leg in 2:59:58, the second-fastest time recorded to date by a woman on the Hawaii course. Her victory was described as the "biggest upset in Ironman Hawaii history", "a remarkable feat, deemed to be a near impossible task for any athlete racing as a rookie at their first Ironman World Championships" and "one of the biggest shocks in the sport's history."

==== 2008: a new season ====
At the Ironman Australia Triathlon in April 2008, her first Ironman since Hawaii, Wellington again won by a margin of five minutes, finishing 9th overall. Her marathon time of 3:01:53 was beaten by only two men. Only twenty days later, she attempted her first World Cup race, the Tongyeong BG Triathlon in Korea, but could only finish in 22nd place. She wrote, "If I judged every day by whether I win or lose, yesterday would be considered a 'bad day' [...] But I need to have these days – because the 'defeats' expose my weaknesses, and enable me to grow, learn and develop as an athlete."

==== European champion ====
At the Ironman European Championship race held in Frankfurt, Germany on 6 July 2008, in perfect weather conditions, Wellington recorded the second-fastest time to date by a woman over the Ironman distance, just 32 seconds outside Paula Newby-Fraser's world record of 8:50:53 set in the 1994 Ironman Europe race, which was then held in Roth. Spectators were aware throughout the race that Wellington was close to breaking the world record, but she did not know exactly what it was, and in any case preferred to slow down to celebrate her victory over the last few kilometres, exchanging greetings and hi-fives with the crowd. Her coach said that her plan was "to do it as easy as possible" once she had got to the front. Other factors affecting her time were that she lost some of her nutrition on the bike (having to rely on the aid stations instead) and that the bike course was 2 km too long.

==== Beating all but one of the men at Alpe d'Huez ====
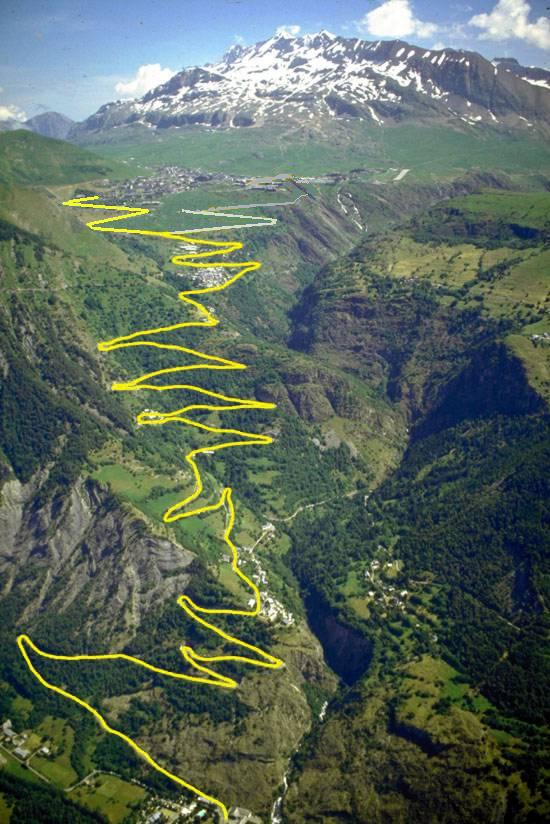
The notorious 21 bends at the end of the bike stage of the Alpe d'Huez triathlon

Later that month, she retained her title at the long-distance Alpe d'Huez Triathlon, finishing second overall, more than 25 minutes ahead of second-placed Aléxandra Louison and only 1 minute 23 seconds behind the winning man, Marcus Ornellas. She recorded the fastest overall time for the ascent of les 21 virages (pictured, right).

==== First half-Ironman win ====
At her previous two attempts on the half-Ironman distance, Wellington had finished 5th (Wimbleball, mechanical difficulties) and 3rd (Singapore, less than three weeks after her first Ironman). On 17 August 2008 she achieved her first win at the half-Ironman distance at the Timberman 70.3 triathlon in Gilford, New Hampshire, placing sixth overall, 18 minutes ahead of runner-up Amanda Stevens.

==== ITU long distance world champion and second Ironman world championship win ====
Two weeks after her Timberman win, Wellington met the ironman-distance world record holder, Yvonne van Vlerken on the latter's home ground at Almere in an eagerly-awaited clash for the ITU long distance World Championship title. Wellington won with a "dominating performance", more than 17 minutes in front of Denmark's Charlotte Kolters. Van Vlerken finished in third place, 19 minutes behind Wellington.

In October Wellington returned to Kona as defending champion and retained her title, setting a new Hawaii marathon course record of 2:57:44. Despite losing around 10 minutes because of a flat tyre – a delay which would have been greater if fellow competitor Rebekah Keat had not given her a spare CO_{2} cartridge – she finished some 15 minutes ahead of second-placed Yvonne van Vlerken.

==== Leaving teamTBB ====
On 27 October, Wellington announced that, together with Hilary Biscay and Belinda Granger, she would be leaving teamTBB and their coach Brett Sutton to train under new coach Cliff English. She said:

I owe so much to Brett, and teamTBB. It was Brett that advised me to turn pro, he told me to do an Ironman and he trained me to win two World Ironman Championships. Not only that, the Team framework enabled me to train with some of the best athletes in the world; to grow and develop as a person and to learn some incredibly important lessons. With the Team I reached heights that I never thought possible, and for that I am truly grateful. teamTBB is focused on helping "development athletes" who might otherwise not have the opportunity to succeed in professional triathlon. I no longer fit into their framework, and hence the time has come for me to move on.

Two weeks later, Wellington announced that, instead of Cliff English (fiancé and coach of her rival Samantha McGlone) her new coach would be Simon Lessing.

=== 2009–2011: life after teamTBB ===
==== First world record at Roth ====
Despite suffering from shingles, Wellington set a new record for ironman-distance triathlon races of 8:31:59 on 12 July 2009 at the Quelle Challenge Roth, beating Yvonne van Vlerken's record set a year earlier over the same course by 13 minutes and 49 seconds. Rebekah Keat, who finished second, 7 minutes 25 seconds behind Wellington, also beat van Vlerken's time. Wellington's bike split (4:40:28) was a new world record. Commentator Timothy Carlson wrote, "Superwoman Chrissie Wellington didn't just break it, she obliterated the one-year-old women's Iron-distance world record today."

In August, Wellington dropped her coach Simon Lessing to become self-coached.

==== Third Ironman world championship win and new Hawaii course record ====
In October, Wellington won the world championship for the third time with a new course record of 8:54:02, beating Paula Newby-Fraser's record of 8:55:28 which had stood since 1992. She finished 19 mins 57 secs ahead of second-place Mirinda Carfrae, the 2007 Ironman 70.3 World Champion who, in her first Ironman race, ran a marathon time of 2:56:51, fifty-three seconds faster than Wellington's record of the previous year. Wellington's victory was described as "stunning" and "even more dominant" than usual. Only 22 men were faster than Wellington.

Commenting on Wellington's record, Newby-Fraser said, "But the revelation I had was watching how hard she worked for it ... and it was clear she was going to the wall. And I am certain she had to leave a little bit of herself out there to get it done. She didn't take a moment to enjoy until she crossed the line. Part of me was gratified by that. I know what she had to do to get it and I hope she realizes it's not that easy. I know it wasn't that easy for her. A race like that takes a piece of herself out there." A year later her coach Dave Scott revealed that she had an upper hamstring injury and that, "Deep down inside, she had a bit of a struggle in 2009." Even though she had broken the long-standing course record, Scott said, "But I knew, and she knew, and I told her in my ever-candid, callous style, that she didn't have her best day."

==== 2010: New Year bike crash, surgery and recovery ====
On Saturday 2 January, during an intended 5-hour training ride in the Surrey Hills with her boyfriend and two other friends, Wellington fell from her bicycle when it slipped on black ice. She fractured her radius, two metacarpals and two fingers in her right arm and hand. She required surgery under general anaesthetic to insert wires (later removed) into her arm and wrist and had to wear a cast on her arm for six weeks.

The injury severely limited her training, but once the cast was removed she was able to train intensively with her friend Catriona Morrison near Águilas in south-east Spain. She later acknowledged that the crash had a positive outcome, enforcing a mental and physical break and enabling her to focus on other areas of improvement such as her strength and to properly resolve her hamstring problems, which had been hampering her running.

Wellington returned to competition on 6 June, when she defended her title at Ironman 70.3 Kansas. She won in a time of 4:07:49, more than 16 minutes in front of Pip Taylor, placing 11th overall (10th among the pro men).

==== More world records at Challenge Roth ====
On 18 July 2010 Wellington defended her Challenge Roth title in Germany in a new ironman-distance world record time of 8:19:13, placing seventh overall and bettering her own record by more than 12 minutes. In so doing, she set a new women's record for the bike split of 4:36:33, and then finished the race with a "stunning" 2:48:54 for the marathon, beating Erin Baker's record of 2:49:53 which had stood since 1990. Only three men recorded a faster marathon run, two of whom were less than a minute faster. Her winning margin (32:57) over second-placed Rebekah Keat was greater than her time (26:37) behind the winning man.

After this race, her former coach Brett Sutton wrote, "The triathlon world should be rejoicing. For the first time in the women's sport and second time in this sport they have a true champion not just a champion of the sport like Erin Baker and Paula Newby Fraser, but also a champion on the level of a Kieren Perkins, a 'Thorpedo' or a Michael Phelps if we look at swimming. If we take a look at running, a Haile Gebrselassie, a Paula Radcliffe." He added, "You have in Chrissie a person of true international sporting excellence that is overshadowed by no one in any other sport."

==== Disappointment at Kona ====
In August Wellington set a new course record in her third consecutive victory at Timberman 70.3, but at the last minute on the day of the Ironman World Championship, 9 October 2010 she decided not to start the race because of illness, describing it as "the hardest decision of her life to date." Subsequent blood tests, which also included an anti-doping control, showed that she had, or had had, bacterial strep throat, bacterial pneumonia and West Nile virus.

==== First official Ironman world record ====
On 21 November, having allowed herself six weeks to recover from her illness, Wellington set a new world record for an Ironman-branded race over the full Ironman distance in Tempe, Arizona of 8:36:13. Her time was the third-fastest female ironman-distance time to date, beaten only by her two records in Roth. Despite riding the last two miles of the bike course on a flat tyre, she beat the previous course record by 35 minutes, and runner-up Linsey Corbin's time by 29 minutes. Her marathon time was only 4:44 slower than the fastest men's run, and her swim time only 32 seconds slower than the men's winner, Timo Bracht. Commentator Timothy Carlson quoted Wellington's boyfriend as saying, "It's a sign of a true champion that she can pick herself up after something as painful as her withdrawal at Hawaii. Six weeks later, all the issues from Hawaii were behind her, and today she was phenomenal", to which Carlson added, "Phenomenal might have been an understatement."

==== 2011: a new season, and two more world records ====
Having trained in Stellenbosch since mid-February, Wellington won Ironman South Africa on 10 April in a new "M-dot" world record time of 8:33:56, lowering her own record by a little over 2 minutes. She finished in 8th place overall, nearly 35 minutes ahead of runner-up Rachel Joyce, who in turn broke the previous course record by 8 minutes. Not only did Wellington set new female bike, run and course records, but her marathon time of 2:52:54 was also faster than all of the men.

In July, Wellington bettered her own ironman-distance world record at Challenge Roth by exactly one minute, to 8:18:13. Her marathon time of 2:44:35 was also a new world record. Only four men finished in front of her, and only one man, the winner Andreas Raelert, who also set a new world record, was able to beat her marathon time.

==== Bike crash and partial recovery before Kona ====
On a routine training ride near Boulder, Wellington suffered a serious bike crash on Saturday 24 September, exactly two weeks before the World Championships in Kona. She received severe road rash (equivalent to second- or third-degree burns) on her left leg and injuries to her left elbow and hip. Wellington described the pain as "intense", much worse than the fractures she had suffered earlier in the year, but X-rays showed no broken bones. Her first attempt at training after the accident was on the following Tuesday when, despite a swollen, infected leg, she tried swimming. She could manage no more than two lengths, in pain she later described as "excruciating". She had to be lifted out of the pool, and given crutches to enable her to walk; her boyfriend Tom Lowe and coach Dave Scott had to carry her back to her car. The next day, Wednesday, she was due to fly to Kona, but she preferred to remain in Boulder, close to the experts treating her. The infection was causing her fever and night sweats, and the hip pain had disturbed her running gait.

By Saturday, the infection had died down, and she flew to Kona. On Sunday Wellington published a blog post in which she referred to Sun Tzu's book The Art of War and elaborated on how war strategy could be applied to triathlon, saying that she hadn't lost her fight because of her injuries and quoting Bella Bayliss's dictum that "It's not a race, it's war." The flight had caused her leg to swell up again, but she was still able to do some bike and run training. On Monday she tried a four-kilometre swim, her first hard swim since the crash; this produced pain in her pectoral muscle, which worsened over subsequent training sessions. On Tuesday she tried another swim session: after 1 km she had to stop, and again had to be lifted out of the pool by Lowe. She later wrote, "I was 'crying into my goggles', and described the pain as 'unbearable'", adding, "I was convinced I'd broken my rib. Every breath hurt and I couldn't move my arm properly." The previous day Mike Leahy had begun treating Wellington using his Active Release Therapy (ART); he instructed her to go to the hospital for tests, not wanting to continue ART treatment if the problem was a fracture. The hospital's first concern, from the swollen state of her leg, was that she might have a pulmonary embolism. Six hours of tests showed that she had no fractures, nor any embolism, but that she did have damaged pectoral and intercostal muscles; the badly infected state of her leg was obvious from the appalling smell when the bandages were removed.

Wellington's condition improved over the remaining three days before the race, thanks in part to a new course of antibiotics, and continued ART and acupuncture treatments. In public, consistent with her mantra of "never give your opponents anything", Wellington admitted to little more than road rash, but journalists at the pre-race press conference were, correctly, able to detect a different, less confident, attitude in Wellington before the race.

==== Regaining the world title ====
Her coach had advised her to hold back on her swim speed, otherwise she might not be able to complete the race; together with the lack of power in her left arm, that meant her swim was much slower than usual at 61 minutes. In contrast with her previous races at Kona, where Wellington had dominated on the bike, she started the marathon stage with five women still in front of her. Wellington's main concern, though, was Mirinda Carfrae, the 2010 champion who was only a little over three minutes behind her, and the only woman who had run faster than her on this course – a serious worry, given Wellington's injuries.

2011 World Championship Highlights

YouTube video (6:59), showing the road rash injuries to Wellington's left leg during the 2011 Ironman World Championship race.

Her hip had been in constant pain during the bike stage, but once she started on the marathon, her hamstrings began seizing up as well. She wrote, "I saw my family at mile three and gave them a smile, but inside the pain was unbearable." She described the pain on the marathon as "the worst I'd ever known. 'You are going to hurt like hell', I said to myself, because this is just the start." She ran the first half of the marathon in 1 hour 22 minutes – her fastest ever at Kona – increasing her lead over Carfrae to five minutes. Her body slowed down in the intense heat approaching the Energy Lab, where she passed Caroline Steffen to gain the lead. She crossed the finish line with a marathon time of 2:52:41, winning in an overall time of 8:55:08. Her marathon time was a course record until Carfrae crossed the line in second place 2 minutes 49 seconds later, in turn setting a new marathon course record of 2:52:09. Her overall time was second only to the course record she had set in 2009.

After the race, her coach Dave Scott told journalist T J Murphy that Wellington was "traumatised" by the effects of her injuries, and that despite her "stoic" attitude, her injuries were "worse than any of us might have imagined", adding, "I don't think Chrissie will appreciate me telling you this, but it's important." Murphy described her performance as "inspirational", but added, "it was more than that. It was chilling. [...] It was chilling to watch because you could see Wellington racing her way right to the hospital, paying literally no heed to her brain's internal governor – one that has been wired into the human body through millions of years of evolution."

== Retirement from professional triathlon racing ==
Leaving open the possibility that she might return to triathlon racing, Wellington formally announced on 16 January 2012 that she would be taking a one-year break from professional Ironman racing in 2012, in order to spend more time in the UK with her friends and family, and to "explore new opportunities" which she would otherwise be unable to undertake with the necessary focus and dedication. Two exceptional opportunities arising in 2012 were promoting her book A Life Without Limits (due to be published the following month) and the London Olympics. She would also be able to devote more time to her charity work, to raising the profile of triathlon in the UK, and to representing her sponsors. Among the charities she hoped to spend more time supporting were Jane's Appeal, the Blazeman Foundation for ALS, Girls Education Nepal and Challenged Athletes Foundation. Having missed the 2000 Olympics when she was in Australia, she was keen to experience the Olympics in her home country in any capacity, whether as a spectator, as a volunteer, or in the media. In August she joined the BBC's television commentary team for both the men's and women's Olympic triathlon events.

... she doth bestride the world of Ironman like a Colossus.

— Timothy Carlson, after Cassius in Shakespeare's Julius Caesar, commenting on Wellington's retirement.

On 3 December Wellington announced that she had decided to make her retirement from professional triathlon racing permanent. She referred to the World Ironman Championships in 2011, with the enormous difficulties she overcame on that occasion, as her "perfect race", the race which "completed" her. She would continue to be associated with the sport, but not as a professional racer.

== Post-triathlon career ==
=== Parkrun ===
Chrissie Wellington first discovered parkrun when she came across 300 people lining up in Richmond Park on a Saturday morning, and spontaneously decided to take part. In February 2013, Chrissie joined parkrun's staff as Head of Participation. She later became its Head of Health and Wellbeing.

On 2 May 2015 Wellington married Tom Lowe. They have a daughter named Esme.

=== Comrades Marathon ===
In June 2019, Chrissie completed the Comrades Marathon, one of the world's toughest ultra marathons. She finished 14th in the women's 40–49 age category.

== International development ==
Chrissie Wellington has said she has two passions in life: sport and development. In her victory speech at the 2007 Hawaii Ironman, she referred to her experience teaching at Beaver Country Day School near Boston, where she first noticed the difference that sport can make to children's lives. She also noted, from her experience in Nepal, how sport can bring conflict-affected communities together. In an interview, her coach Brett Sutton said:

She has kicked around for years through South East Asia, working for underprivileged people. That's why she was in Nepal. Already this year she has done clinics in Thailand and the Philippines and now sponsors a young Filipino athlete to attend our group for the coach to work some magic. I think her win could be the catalyst for the sport in South East Asia.

To give you an insight into Chrissie Wellington's mind, her first talk to me about the media and the frenzy around her, was "Boss, I don't want us to lose sight of what we discussed about my goal. I want to be able to use my triathlon result to help develop social programs for underprivileged kids in South East Asia. Any sponsor who does not believe this is a priority, we can do without. If it costs me a little money, I am at ease with that." [...] This is the real Chrissie, the one people don't see behind the flashy smile.

Reflecting on her victory three weeks later, Wellington wrote:

Anyone that knows me has probably been on the receiving end of one of my rants. Like a stuck record I ramble on about development to anyone that will (pretend to) listen. It is my passion, and has been for a long time. Poverty, conflict, violence, crime, exclusion and so forth are not givens. They happen for a reason. We have the power to change things. And sport is one vehicle for doing so. It has the power to build bridges, to empower, to teach, to heal – this is what triathlon and every other sport should be about. I hope that I [...] can, in a small way, help to inspire people to take up sport, realise their own dreams and their full potential.

== Awards and honours ==
Chrissie Wellington was named the 2009 Sunday Times Sportswoman of the Year at an awards ceremony on 23 November 2009, ahead of Jessica Ennis and Victoria Pendleton in an online public vote. She was appointed Member of the Order of the British Empire (MBE) in the 2010 Birthday Honours for services to ironman triathlons and promoted to Officer of the Order of the British Empire (OBE) in the 2016 New Year Honours for services to sport and charity. In December 2010, having previously awarded her the university's Sporting Achievement Award in 2007, the University of Birmingham granted her an honorary doctorate "as a tribute to her work in both her passions: sport and international development". Citing her "astonishing" sporting achievements and her later promotion of sport as a "catalyst for community development", the University of Bristol granted her the degree of Doctor of Laws honoris causa in February 2017.

== Results ==
The following table includes a complete list of all Chrissie Wellington's races as a professional triathlete.

Date	Position	Overall position	Event	length km	Swim time	Bike time	Run time	transition time	Total time
8 October 2011	1st		Ironman World Championship, Hawaii	226.3	1:01:03	4:56:53	2:52:41	0:04:31	8:55:08
21 August 2011	1st		Timberman Ironman 70.3, Lake Winnipesaukee, New Hampshire	113.2	0:27:08	2:27:51	1:18:44	0:02:50	4:16:33
10 July 2011	1st	5th	Challenge Roth, Roth, Germany (Ironman distance)	226.3	0:49:49	4:40:39	2:44:35	0:03:13	8:18:13
12 June 2011	1st		Ironman 70.3 Kansas	113.2	0:27:41	2:24:09	1:16:41	0:02:37	4:11:08
10 April 2011	1st	8th	Ironman South Africa, Port Elizabeth	226.3	0:51:40	4:45:23	2:52:54	0:03:59	8:33:56
21 November 2010	1st		Ironman Arizona, Tempe	226.3	0:51:56	4:47:06	2:52:55	0:04:16	8:36:13
22 August 2010	1st		Timberman Ironman 70.3, Lake Winnipesaukee, New Hampshire	113.2	0:25:40	2:22:14	1:19:06	0:03:11	4:10:11
18 July 2010	1st	7th	Challenge Roth, Roth, Germany (Ironman distance)	226.3	0:50:28	4:36:33	2:48:54	0:03:21	8:19:13
6 June 2010	1st	11th	Ironman 70.3 Kansas	113.2	0:28:43	2:21:16	1:15:12	0:02:38	4:07:49
10 October 2009	1st		Ironman World Championship, Hawaii	226.3	0:54:31	4:52:06	3:03:05	0:04:20	8:54:02
23 August 2009	1st		Timberman Ironman 70.3, Lake Winnipesaukee, New Hampshire (Note: "Timberman 70.3 2009 Pro Order of Finish". Timberman Triathlon. 23 August 2009.)	113.2	0:27:22	2:19:59	1:24:36	0:03:14	4:15:11
9 August 2009	2nd		5430 Long Course Triathlon, Boulder, Colorado	113.2	0:28:58	2:16:38	1:24:54	0:01:49	4:12:18
12 July 2009	1st		Challenge Roth, Roth, Germany (Ironman distance)	226.3	0:50:28	4:40:28	2:57:32	0:03:33	8:31:59
14 June 2009	1st		Ironman 70.3 Kansas	113.2	0:25:11	2:26:51	1:20:16	0:02:34	4:14:52
17 May 2009	6th		Columbia Triathlon, Columbia, Maryland (1.5 km / 41 km / 10 km) (Note: "Events Splash Page". championchiptiming.com. Archived from the original on 23 May 2021.Note that bike split shown includes total transition time (T2 was 1:29, T1 is not available))	52.5	0:21:43	1:16:23	0:40:35		2:18:40
5 April 2009	1st		Ironman Australia Triathlon, Port Macquarie	226.3	0:50:48	5:03:01	2:59:15	0:04:06	8:57:10
11 October 2008	1st		Ironman World Championship, Hawaii (Note: "Race results for 2008". World Triathlon Corporation.)	226.3	0:56:20	5:08:16	2:57:44	0:04:05	9:06:23
31 August 2008	1st		ITU Long Distance World Championship (O3), Almere (4 km / 120 km / 30 km)	154.0	1:10:05	3:03:19	1:54:18	0:05:04	6:12:44
17 August 2008	1st	6th	Timberman Ironman 70.3, Lake Winnipesaukee, New Hampshire	113.2	0:26:20	2:21:02	1:21:42	0:02:44	4:11:46
30 July 2008	1st	2nd	Alpe d'Huez long-distance triathlon (2.2 km / 115 km / 22 km)	139.2	0:29:57	4:09:05	1:36:34	0:02:49	6:18:25
6 July 2008	1st		Ironman European Championship, Frankfurt, Germany (Note: "2008 Ironman Germany results". datasport.com, on behalf of World Triathlon Corporation. enter bib number 60 in "Startnummer" box to get full splits)	226.3	0:48:34	4:57:17	3:01:44	0:03:50	8:51:24.7
27 April 2008	22nd		Tongyeong BG Triathlon World Cup, Tongyeong (1.5 km / 40 km / 10 km)	51.5	0:21:09	0:59:29	0:37:44		1:58:21
6 April 2008	1st	9th	Ironman Australia Triathlon, Port Macquarie	226.3	0:53:27	5:08:34	3:01:53		9:03:55
2 December 2007	4th		Laguna Phuket Triathlon (1.8 km / 55 km / 12 km) (Note: "Laguna Phuket Triathlon results". Laguna Phuket Triathlon. Archived from the original on 5 February 2012. choose "2007 Individual results" from drop-down box)	68.8	0:26:07	1:36:27	0:45:23	0:02:38	2:47:57
13 October 2007	1st		Ironman World Championship, Hawaii (Note: "Race results for 2007". World Triathlon Corporation.)	226.3	0:58:09	5:06:15	2:59:58	0:04:25	9:08:45
2 September 2007	3rd		Singapore Ironman 70.3	113.2	0:28:00	2:18:13	1:33:05		4:19:18
26 August 2007	1st	7th	Ironman Korea, Seogwipo City	226.3	0:57:34	5:17:03	3:28:13	0:11:48	9:54:37
1 August 2007	1st	9th	Alpe d'Huez long-distance triathlon (2.2 km / 115 km / 22 km)	139.2	0:31:08	4:27:11	1:41:07	0:03:49	6:43:15
15 July 2007	5th		Lorient ITU Long course world championship (3 km / 80 km / 20 km) (Note: "TRIATHLON DE LORIENT Chp. Monde Elite Femmes" (PDF). lorient-triathlon.com. 15 July 2007.)	103.0	0:41:35	2:10:13	1:12:14		4:07:08
7 July 2007	5th		ITU Premium European Cup, Holten (1.5 km / 40 km / 10 km)	51.5	0:19:29	1:11:09	0:35:37		2:06:15
23 June 2007	1st		Zürich Olympic distance triathlon (1.5 km / 40 km / 10 km)	51.5	0:21:08	1:03:57	0:34:27		1:59:33.5
17 June 2007	5th		UK Ironman 70.3, Wimbleball, Exmoor	113.2	0:26:24	3:07:43	1:25:44	0:04:58	5:04:45
2 June 2007	1st		Blenheim Triathlon sprint distance (750m / 19.3 km / 5.2 km)	25.25	0:10:59	0:31:57	0:20:30	0:04:24	1:07:50
5 May 2007	1st		Subic Bay ITU Triathlon Asian Cup (1.5 km / 40 km / 10 km)	51.5	0:18:03	1:07:48	0:37:48		2:03:41
1 April 2007	1st		Bangkok Triathlon (1.5 km / 40 km / 10 km)	51.5	0:14:39	1:00:51	0:43:59		1:59:28
25 March 2007	2nd		Mekong River ITU Triathlon Asian Cup (1.5 km / 40 km / 10 km) (Note: "2007 Mekong River ITU Triathlon Asian Cup". International Triathlon Union. select "Start Lists/Results" on left, then "Results for Elite Women" from drop-down box on right)	51.5					1:55:47
2 September 2006	1st		ITU Age Group World Championship, Lausanne (1.5 km / 40 km / 10 km)	51.5	0:21:57	1:08:00	0:37:26	0:10:11	2:17:32

Note

- Where transition times are not shown explicitly, they are included in the split times (usually the bike time).

General sources

- "Results for Chrissie Wellington". xtri.com. Archived from the original on 4 February 2010.
- "Triathlon Results for Christine Wellington". TRIResults.com. (note: only results marked TR are official)

== Sources ==
- Bourne, Debra (2014). Parkrun: much more than just a run in the park. Foreword by Bruce Fordyce. Chequered Flag Publishing. ISBN 978-0-9569460-7-2.
- Müller, Mathias; Carlson, Timothy (2010). 17 Hours to Glory: Extraordinary Stories from the Heart of Triathlon. Boulder, CO: Velo Press. ISBN 978-1-934030-43-1.
- Wellington, Chrissie (2012). A Life Without Limits: A World Champion's Journey. London: Constable. ISBN 978-1-84901-713-8.
- Wellington, Chrissie (2017). To the Finish Line: A World Champion Triathlete's Guide To Your Perfect Race. London: Constable. ISBN 978-1-4721-2497-5.
