= Jacques-Philippe Saveuse de Beaujeu =

Canadian politician

Jacques-Philippe Saveuse de Beaujeu (ca 1772 – June 19, 1832) was a seigneur and political figure in Lower Canada.

He was baptized on May 5, 1772, the son of seigneur Louis Liénard de Beaujeu de Villemonde. In 1794, he was named Protonotary of the Court of King's Bench for Montreal district. In 1802, he married Catherine, daughter of Gaspard-Joseph Chaussegros de Léry. Later that year, he renounced his claim to his father's estate, due to the large debts associated with it. However, in 1807, he inherited the seigneuries of Soulanges and Nouvelle-Longueuil from his maternal uncle, Joseph-Dominique-Emmanuel Le Moyne de Longueuil. He served as a captain in the local militia during the War of 1812. He was elected to the Legislative Assembly of Lower Canada for Montreal East in 1814. In 1831, he was named to the Legislative Council.

He died of cholera at Montreal in 1832, while still a member of the council.

His son Georges-René served in the legislative council for the Province of Canada.
