= Horwill =

Horwill is a surname. Notable people with the surname include:

- Frank Horwill (1927–2012), UK Athletics senior level 4 coach
- James Horwill (born 1985), Australian Rugby Union player
