= Louis Liénard de Beaujeu de Villemonde =

Louis Liénard de Beaujeu de Villemonde (September 16, 1716 – June 5, 1802) was a militia and army officer and seigneur in Quebec.

The son of Louis Liénard de Beaujeu and Thérèse-Denise Juchereau de Saint-Denys (née Migeon de Branssat), he was born in Montreal. In 1723, Beaujeu became a second ensign in the colonial regular troops; he became a first ensign six years later. In 1744, he was promoted to lieutenant. He fought in the Battle of Grand Pré in 1747. In the same year, Beaujeu married Louise-Charlotte, the daughter of François-Étienne Cugnet; she died during childbirth one year later. In 1751, he was promoted to captain and became commander of the posts at Kaministiquia and Michilimackinac. He married Geneviève, the daughter of Paul-Joseph Le Moyne de Longueuil, in 1753. In 1769, his wife acquired the seigneury of Isle-aux-Grues, Île aux Oies and adjacent islands.

When the American invaded Quebec, Beaujeu raised a relief force of 150 men, but his advance guard were captured at Michel Blais' house in the Battle of Saint-Pierre. The remainder of the force was dispersed and Beaujeu went into hiding. His son Charles-François fought on the American side during the American Revolutionary War.

After experiencing financial difficulties, Beaujeu sold part of the seigneury, two small islands known as the fief of Grandville, in 1789.

He died at Cap-Saint-Ignace in Lower Canada at the age of 85.

His son Jacques-Philippe Saveuse de Beaujeu was a member of the Legislative Council of Quebec.
