= Brett Sutton =

Australian triathlon coach

Brett Sutton (born 16 May 1959) is an Australian triathlon coach and a former professional boxer, boxing coach, greyhound trainer, racehorse trainer and swimming coach, who is the head coach of Trisutto.com. Before setting up Trisutto.com, he was head coach of the triathlon team teamTBB.

He has coached many World and Olympic champions, including Ironman world record holder Chrissie Wellington and Olympic champions Nicola Spirig and Emma Snowsill. (Note: "In January 2007 ... Sutton had guided five separate women to ITU Olympic-distance World Championships. Sutton-coached athletes have also won Commonwealth Games gold, Life Time Fitness riches, two ITU long-course World Championship titles, and multiple Ironman 1st-place finishes.") He is known for his forthright views on training methods and strong criticism of the International Triathlon Union (ITU) and its officials.

In 1999, he pleaded guilty in an Australian court to five sexual offences committed in the late 1980s against a teenage girl swimmer whom he was coaching. After the trial, in which he was given a suspended sentence, he was banned for life from coaching in Australia, and Sutton's marriage ended in divorce. Sutton later remarried, and is now based in Leysin, Switzerland, where he lives with his Swiss wife Fiona and their two daughters.

He has been described as "the coach with the most formidable résumé in triathlon", "widely recognised as one of the best triathlon coaches", and "widely considered to be the best and most unorthodox coach in the sport".

== Early life and career ==
Sutton grew up, under pressure from a father who was a demanding swim coach, in a harsh environment and an extremely violent home. Although he was a poor swimmer, he started swim coaching at the age of 10. Sutton says he comes from "a long line of coaches" and both his parents were coaches. Sutton was expelled from school at around age 15 for coaching during school time, and immediately started his own swim squad. According to Sutton, the squad was very successful but ran into problems when the parents of his swimmers thought he was too young, so he switched to training greyhounds and racehorses.

Sutton took up boxing in his early 20s. After training dogs and horses, Sutton returned to swim coaching, and became a nationally qualified swimming coach. His appointment as coach to the Australian national triathlon team was controversial, as he had not been to college, nor had he any formal training. Rob Pickard, the high-performance manager of Triathlon Australia before the 2000 Olympics said, "I wasn't on the panel that appointed him, but I was glad it did." He added that unfavourable rumours that Sutton "destroyed" and "brutalised" his athletes were started around the same time by rival coaches, jealous of his appointment. Sutton said, "I have no respect for the coaches who haven't paid their dues. In swimming, coaches work their way up over a 15-year time span. From the age of 15, I was coaching all the time."

== Triathlon coaching ==
Sutton emphasises the supreme importance of mental attitude, especially in Ironman, where, as he told Chrissie Wellington, "there are six times in every race where you enter a dark place of doubt and must have that passion to overcome." Examples of the importance of mental strength given by Sutton include: determination; the need to remain calm and composed when things go wrong; building on mistakes rather than dwelling on them; dealing positively with injury rather than fearing it; resting the mind as well as the body—these are "the makings of a great triathlete", otherwise "success will always be elusive." When asked the three most important components for Ironman, Sutton replied, "Consistency, strength and self discipline."

Sutton has an authoritarian coaching style, in which the athlete is expected to trust the coach completely, and to follow instructions without question. At the start of her trial period with Sutton, he told Chrissie Wellington that she needed to "switch off" her mind and "follow orders and not question everything"—something she found very difficult to do.

He is sceptical of gadgets such as power meters and heart rate monitors, and prefers instead to draw on his experience as a swim coach and as a trainer of greyhounds and racehorses. Greg Bennett, whom Sutton coached in the late 1990s and who become an Olympian and double World Cup winner, said, "He has learned how to read animals that are fatigued", a skill which, Bennett says, enables Sutton to push athletes to the limit, but not over it. Sutton regards interval training as a very important part of his programmes, saying, "If it's not long, it's got to be hard." He is infamous for his "black days", such as "Black Wednesday"s, when he requires a seemingly endless succession of hard intervals, or of other very hard sessions. The value of these sessions lies, in Chrissie Wellington's view, in psychological toughening.

Sutton believes that blood lactate testing can be valuable, but only if applied sensibly, for example Loretta Harrop did not run fast enough to get a proper base reading, but she could swim fast enough for lactate testing to be useful in the pool; for other athletes the reverse may be the case.

He argues that Tudor Bompa's theory of periodization is not valid for aerobic sports such as triathlon, calling it "bullshit".

Sutton has a reputation for being hard on his athletes, and was described as being "infamous for his tough training sessions." Sutton says that his training depends on the individual athlete, and that he spends most of his time slowing his athletes down, giving as examples Chrissie Wellington and James Cunnama, who trains less under Sutton than in his "first 5 years in the wilderness". On the other hand, Hillary Biscay once ran 65 km as a training run under Sutton, but Sutton said, "I saw her in 3 years get her dream. I saw her win an Ironman, I saw her get on a great deal of podiums and I saw her beat some great athletes whose talent dwarfed hers. It is about the individual and their needs."

Sutton has expressed the desire to retire from coaching in 2015 in order to focus on his projects that are geared towards social change. He has started projects through teamTBB, such as TriCozumel, that locally promote youth exercise and as well as avoiding obesity and a life of drug use.

=== Assessments by other coaches ===
Siri Lindley, coach of 2010 and 2013 Ironman world champion Mirinda Carfrae, was coached by Sutton from 4th place to win two World Cups and an ITU World Championship. In January 2011, she described Sutton as, in her opinion, "the best coach in the world", adding, "He is an incredible man, and deserves nothing but the utmost respect for the incredible work he has achieved."

Pete Colson, Ironman and ITU world champion Michellie Jones's husband and coach, said of Sutton, "If you look at results only, he's the best coach there is, no doubt about it", but added, "You look at his athletes, they're phenomenal for about two years and then they're gone." Former pro triathlete Alec Rukosuev, who coaches at the National Training Center in Clermont, Florida, said, "Guys like Brett are the ones doing it right. He has a strong personality. All the great coaches do. They are like Napoleon. People will do anything he says."

Ben Bright, now coaching in England, was coached by Sutton in the 1990s and represented New Zealand in the 2000 Olympics. He said, "Because of his background in training horses and dogs in his early years he looks at the animal rather than the person when coaching a session. A person can lie to you and tell you they are feeling something they are not to get the outcome they desire. The animal can't do that, so he sees exactly what is going on and whether he needs to adjust the session he has planned. He also instills a belief within the athlete that they can achieve their goals ... Brett takes away the doubt and just gives them a task to focus on and that helps them keep a clear mind when competing."

== Views ==
=== On world records ===
Athletes can shorten their careers, believes Sutton, by trying to break records in Ironman races. He said, "I've seen plenty of people bust themselves and have bad seasons because they're chasing records." and "This sport is the ultimate tough test, each race hurts your body so much at the top level." Referring to Chrissie Wellington's world record in Roth, her subsequent withdrawal from the 2010 world championships in Kona, and M-dot world record six weeks later, he commented, "To drive it to the edge of oblivion when you have a 20-minute lead is complete negligence. It has cost her dearly last season, but there we were busting it again for the triathlon fraternity by the end of the season." He added, "Ironman is not a 200 m freestyle swim event, it is a body shattering nine hours. We have always treated it with respect. When you have the win you shut it down and work on recovery for the next battle. We both agree to disagree and that is what I most like about Chrissie. We could discuss everything and no recriminations after, it's one of her many strengths."

=== On equipment ===
Sutton says that disc wheels are not appropriate for female Ironman competitors, arguing that girls cannot get the bike above 40 kilometres per hour (24.9 mph) over the Ironman distance. In any case, they are not allowed at Kona, and "we train as we race". Similarly, if the race course has steep descents or tight corners, he prefers to set his female riders up with road drops rather than aerobars or pursuit bars with bar end gear shifters, saying that "Tri girls have the worst handling skill you have ever seen". Sutton is against aero helmets because they do not allow the head to lose sufficient heat: "The athletes cook their brain and run a marathon. They've saved a minute-thirty, then run 15 minutes slower."

Sutton describes running shoes with built-up heels, heavy cushioning and stability plates as "injury city". He argues that, for Ironman running, a mid-foot strike is more efficient than landing on the ball of the foot, and is "the safest, injury-preventative, economical running form", so he likes shoes to be low in the heel.

=== On the ITU ===
Sutton is an outspoken critic of the International Triathlon Union (ITU) and its former president, Les McDonald, believing the organisation has failed to promote and support professional triathletes.

== Sex offences ==
In 1999, Sutton pleaded guilty in an Australian court to five sex offences against a girl swimmer. He committed the first offence in the late 1980s, when the girl was 14 years old, and he was her coach. The judge said that Sutton had "interfered with her sexually in a gross and disgraceful way" and "abused [his] role to an inexcusable degree". Sutton was given a two-year sentence which was suspended partly because, in the words of the judge, "a large number of leading athletes will suffer disadvantage from your absence from the scene". Reporter Steven Downes believes that Sutton escaped jail because the judge did not want to cost Australia any Olympic medals. After the trial, Sutton was banned for life from coaching in Australia, and Sutton's marriage ended in divorce.

Sutton said he pleaded guilty because he "was not going to stand up in court and rubbish the girl", and because "that was the right thing to do. I believe in doing what is right, to take responsibility for my actions, to take my punishment. It's family values, if you like." Downes reported that Sutton's claim that the sex was consensual was not challenged in court, "because it was not entered as evidence". This contradicts statements by Sutton. (Note: In September 2008 Sutton wrote: "There are internal swim squad members that were around during the time the incident happened, and some then went into triathlon, and their career mixed with the next generation of athletes that wanted to know what really happened. These new athletes trained with the group, which contained the female involved in the incident. They all trained together on a daily basis and for at least two seasons saw her interact with me, not only in training but at the Surfers Paradise triathlon club, at social gatherings, and even saw her officiate at some of the club's races. These athletes still hold positions in the sport today. They were called as witnesses and were subject to 3 rounds of interviews by Triathlon Australia. These interviews were not made public. Later, in a published document, the High Performance Manager at the time, said that I asked him to conduct interviews with all girls that I had any interaction with, from 20 yr old and under. His actual report was never made public, as it did not show one incident of impropriety. The Manager also stated publicly, in triathlon magazines, that he was approached by the woman's new husband – who happened to be a triathlon coach in Australia – about the incident, and the woman's husband was advised that it was up to him to make it a police matter if he so wished. This is what happened some 8 yrs later. "The police conducted 200 interviews with female swimmers and found not one complaint. A private detective also conducted interviews. I was not jailed, but given a suspended sentence. The judges reasons were again published, but no one in triathlon agreed with his opinion on the matter and the sentencing. In the court case it was established, without hesitation, that it was consensual – much to the dismay of the coach that had brought forward the complaint in the first place. "The judge did not condone the actions in any way, however he was handed evidence, very similar to what one of your posters alluded to, with 3 sworn testimonies from 3 swimmers in that group at the time, that they would give evidence of dressing room talk. He had at least 30 affidavits from members of the Surfers Paradise triathlon club of them seeing the girl happily training with everyone, and partaking in all club activities with no problems at all. Some listed private conversations she had had with older champion athletes, that were very supportive of me, and who were in that very squad of people.")

Les McDonald, then president of the ITU, said that triathletes who continued to be coached by Sutton should be thrown out of their national teams. In August 2000, the year following the trial, Dan Empfield wrote that Sutton had

also paid a price, both professionally and personally. You cannot be more persona non grata than he is in the world of short-course triathlon. Not only has he been booted out of Triathlon Australia, his athletes have been the subject of persecution as well. Both the ITU and TA have made it clear that if you, as an athlete, are coached by Sutton you do so at your own peril.

Sutton replied, "The price most people think I paid is nothing compared to how I really paid every day since" and that "I understand people's right to hold me in contempt."

== Athlete discrimination ==
Some athletes have experienced criticism for joining Sutton's squad, or have actually been discriminated against as a result of doing so. In May 2000, Sutton wrote, "The sport does not have the right, either morally or legally, to persecute athletes who have done nothing wrong", outlining discrimination against Loretta Harrop, whom he described as the "undisputed best in the world", Andrew Johns ("the best human being alive"), Siri Lindley ("one of nature's kindest") and Joanne King, who won the 1998 world championship, but remained largely ignored because of her association with Sutton. He referred to ITU chief Les McDonald throwing Lindley's winning flowers at her, "along with some obscenities, at the very moment for which she had dreamed for only God knows how long."

In response to criticism, Chrissie Wellington wrote that she did her "due diligence" before her trial week in January 2007 with Sutton's squad. She stated that "child abuse is a serious crime and one which personally revolts me to the core of my being. And I speak from experience", and said that her decision about Sutton was "based on evidence I gathered, both from Brett and from other athletes who were present at the time the incident took place. I did this, and also spoke at length to the rest of the team about his past. This coupled with my own gut feeling about Brett as a man and as a coach led me to accept the offer of a place on the team."

== End notes ==
=== Sources ===
- Murphy, T.J. (August 2008a). "How coach Brett Sutton and TeamTBB are taking on the world". Inside Triathlon.
- Murphy, T.J. (October 2008b). "Brett Sutton: Triathlon Coach". Outside magazine. Archived from the original on 13 December 2010.
- Müller, Mathias; Carlson, Timothy (2010). 17 Hours to Glory: Extraordinary Stories from the Heart of Triathlon. Boulder, CO: Velo Press. ISBN 978-1-934030-43-1.
- Wellington, Chrissie (2012). A Life Without Limits: A World Champion's Journey. London: Constable. ISBN 978-1-84901-713-8.
