= Paul-Joseph Le Moyne de Longueuil =

Paul-Joseph Le Moyne de Longueuil (September 17, 1701 – May 12, 1778) was a seigneur and colonial army officer in New France and governor of Trois-Rivières from 1757 to 1760.

The son of Charles le Moyne de Longueuil, Baron de Longueuil and Claude-Élisabeth Souart d’Adoucourt, he was born in Longueuil and entered the army in France in 1717, becoming lieutenant in 1719. In 1726, he became lieutenant in the colonial army and commander of Fort Frontenac; the following year, Longueuil became captain of his owner company. From 1728 to 1730, he took part in the unsuccessful campaign against the Foxes. In October 1728, he married Marie-Geneviève Joybert de Soulanges; through this marriage, he acquired the seigneuries of L’Islet-du-Portage, Pointe-à-l’Orignal on the Ottawa River and Soulanges. In 1729, he was granted the seigneury of Nouvelle-Longueuil. Several of these properties were located on major fur trading routes. He became commandant of Fort Saint-Frédéric in 1739.

In 1743, Longueuil became commandant at Detroit. During the War of the Austrian Succession, the neighbouring native tribes revolted against the French but Longueuil was later able to reestablish peace in the region. In 1748, he was named town major for Quebec City and, in the following year, he was named king's lieutenant. In 1757, he was named governor for Trois-Rivières.

After Montreal was captured in 1760, Longueuil was sent to France. In 1764, he returned to Canada to settle his affairs and to convince his family to return to France. He sold the seigneury of L’Islet-du-Portage; the remaining properties came under the control of his son Joseph-Dominique-Emmanuel, who later served in the Legislative Council of Lower Canada. Longueuil returned to Tours in France without his family. He later died at Port-Louis at the age of 76.

Longueuil was awarded the cross of Saint-Louis in 1744.

His daughter Geneviève married Louis Liénard de Beaujeu de Villemonde.
