= Battle of Saint-Pierre =

Battle of the American Revolutionary War

Coordinates: 46.92°N 70.63°W

- Part of the American Revolutionary War
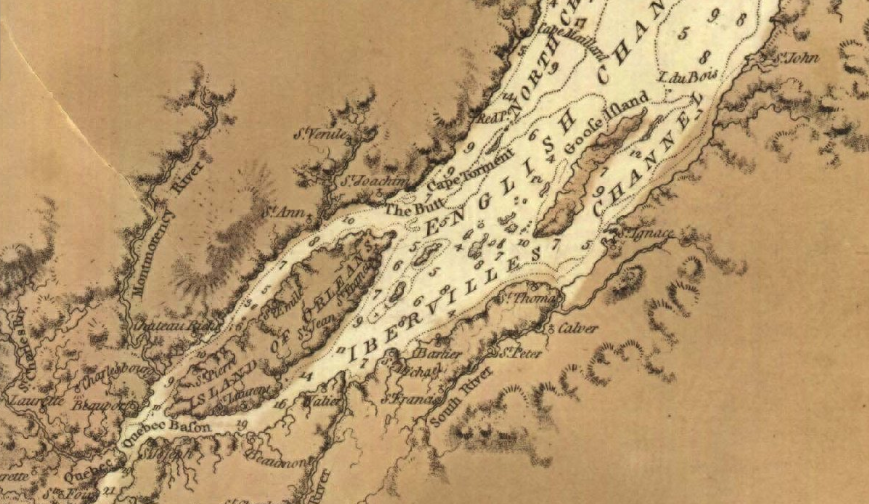
- Detail from a 1780 map. Saint-Pierre, labelled St. Peter, is on the South River.
Date	March 25, 1776
Location	near Saint-Pierre, Quebec
Result	American victory

Belligerents
Canadian sympathizers (United States) United Colonies	(Kingdom of Great Britain) Province of Quebec

Commanders and leaders
John Dubois; Clément Gosselin	Michel Blais (Note: Blais is sometimes also spelled "Blay".); Ignace Aubert de Gaspé; Seigneur Couillard (Note: No sources describing this action give full names for either Gaspé or Couillard. Le Moine, p. 131, identifies Gaspé as the seigneur of St. Jean-Port-Joly, and Couillard as the seigneur of St. Thomas, a parish in one of several seigneuries in the Rivière-du-sud region. P. Roy, p. 78, identifies one Ignace-Philippe Aubert de Gaspé, who inherited the seigneury of St. Jean-Port-Joly in 1781, and who fought in the French and Indian War (and was thus likely known to Beaujeu, who also fought in that war). Couillard is not as readily identifiable, but is likely an heir to either Jean-Baptiste Couillard de l'Espinay or Louis Couillard de l'Espinay, who purchased seigneuries in Rivière-du-Sud in 1725 (Archives Report, 1884, pp. 21–22).)

Strength
150 Canadian militia 80 Americans	46 Canadian militia

Casualties and losses
6 killed unknown wounded	3–6 killed 10 wounded 21–38 prisoners

The Battle of Saint-Pierre was a military confrontation on March 25, 1776, near the Quebec village of Saint-Pierre, east of Lévis. This confrontation, which occurred during the Continental Army's siege of Quebec following its defeat at the Battle of Quebec, was between forces that were both largely composed of Canadian militia, including individuals on both sides of the conflict that had been recruited in the same communities. The Patriot forces routed the Loyalist forces, killing at least 3 and capturing more than 30.

== Background ==
Early in the American Revolutionary War, the Second Continental Congress had invited the citizens of the Province of Quebec to join them, first by addressing letters to them, and then by invading the province with the goal of ousting the British government of General Guy Carleton. The invasion reached a peak on December 31, 1775, when the Continental Army, under the command of General Richard Montgomery, was defeated before the gates of the city of Quebec. The battle resulted in the death of Montgomery and the capture of over 400 men.

Following the defeat, the remnants of the Army, now under the command of General Benedict Arnold, besieged the city. During this time, they worked to recruit French-speaking Canadians to support their efforts toward independence, while Carleton and the British worked to build Loyalist support among the Canadiens.

== Loyalist militia recruitment ==
Early on the morning of March 14, 1776, Jean-Baptiste Chasson, (Note: Lanctot calls him "Chasseur"; Baby uses Chasson.) a Canadian miller from Saint-Vallier, crossed the Saint Lawrence River by canoe and reached the city of Quebec. He brought news to General Carleton that the Americans were setting up a gun battery at Pointe-Lévis, on the south shore of the river, across from the city. This battery would command the city's harbor and shipping on the river. Chasson also told Carleton that people to the south of the city were prepared to rise up against the Americans.

Carleton gave Chasson instructions to deliver to Louis Liénard de Beaujeu, the seigneur of the Isle-aux-Grues (Crane Island), an island in the Saint Lawrence, and a man with previous military experience in the French and Indian War. The instructions included intercepted communications from Arnold describing the difficult conditions in the siege camp and an amnesty for people who had previously supported the Americans but were now willing to assist the British. Beaujeu, who had previously been asked to raise militia in support of the British, set about raising a force to make an attack on the unfinished battery at Pointe-Lévis. By March 23, he had assembled over 100 men at Sainte-Anne-de-la-Pocatière. When this force reached Saint-Thomas on the night of March 24, it was joined there by an additional 70 men. An advance guard from this force, numbering 46, was sent to Saint-Pierre under the command of Couillard and Gaspé, where they established a base at the house of Michel Blais, a Loyalist and former commander of the local militia.

== Americans warned ==
Habitants from Beaumont friendly to the Americans notified the commander at Pointe-Lévis of the recruiting activity. In response, General Arnold, sent a detachment of 80 Americans under John Dubois to deal with the situation. Pierre Ayotte and Clément Gosselin, recruiters working for Moses Hazen, the commander of the 2nd Canadian Regiment, raised about 150 men who joined the Americans. These forces headed up the southern shore to investigate the reports. Some of these recruits were from the same villages from which Beaujeu had recruited men. A small band of militia from Beaumont went to Saint-Michel and arrested Chasson, who was planning to return to the city.

== Conflict ==
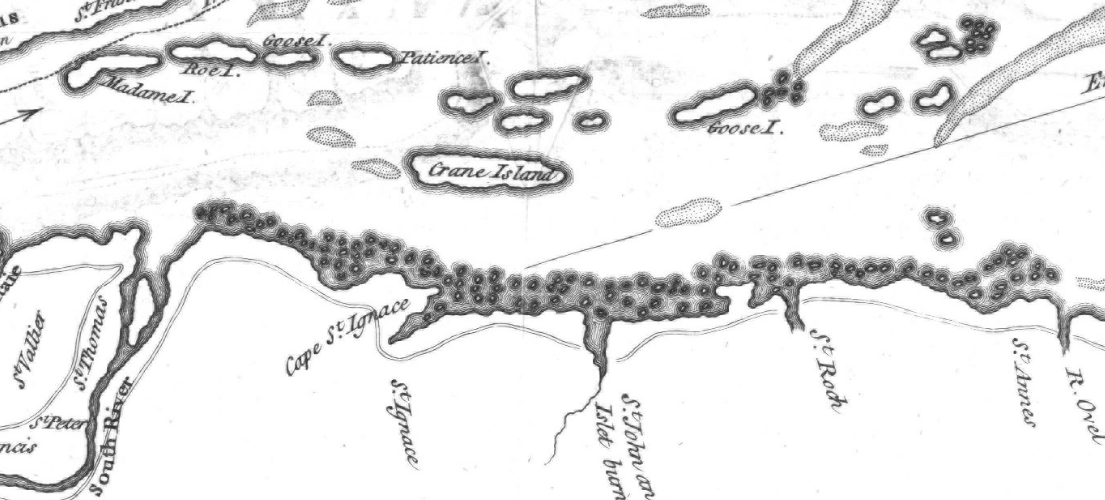
Detail from a 1772 map, showing Crane Island (Île-aux-Grues), St. Anne's (Sainte-Anne-de-la-Pocatiere), St. Thomas, and St. Peters (Saint-Pierre)

The Loyalist advance guard was surprised by the arrival of the Patriot forces at Saint-Pierre, and barricaded themselves in the house, where they were attacked by Dubois' men with musket and cannon. While a few escaped, the majority surrendered, and three were killed. Their priest, Charles-François Bailly de Messein, was wounded in this battle. It is said that, because both sides recruited in the same areas to build their militias, that there were some families whose members fought against each other in this battle.

== Aftermath ==
Beaujeu, his plans uncovered, disbanded the militia and went into hiding on Île-aux-Grues. After Dubois established that the action had been sanctioned by the British, some of the prisoners were released after promising not to take up arms again. The remaining 21 prisoners were sent to the American camp outside Quebec.

The skirmish itself had no notable effect on relations between the people and the occupying Americans, which were already deteriorating as the siege dragged on. This was due in part to the fact that the Americans, rather than paying for their supplies in coin, paid with Continental paper currency or promissory notes, deemed to be of little worth by the locals.

== See also ==
- List of American Revolutionary War battles
