= Joseph-Dominique-Emmanuel Le Moyne de Longueuil =

Joseph-Dominique-Emmanuel Le Moyne de Longueuil (April 2, 1738 – January 19, 1807) was a soldier, seigneur and politician in New France and Quebec.

The son of Paul-Joseph Le Moyne de Longueuil and Marie-Geneviève Joybert de Soulanges, he was born in the seigneury of Soulanges and joined the colonial regular troops at the age of 12. In 1751, he was named second ensign. He led a group of Wendat (Hurons) from Notre-Dame-de-Lorette to Fort Duquesne as part of an expedition led by Louis Coulon de Villiers to the Ohio country in 1754. In May 1755, he was promoted to ensign and, in July of that year, took part in the Battle of the Monongahela. In 1759, he was promoted to infantry lieutenant and was named adjutant at Trois-Rivières. After the defeat by the British, he went to Paris, France and stayed with his great uncle Jean-Baptiste Le Moyne de Bienville.

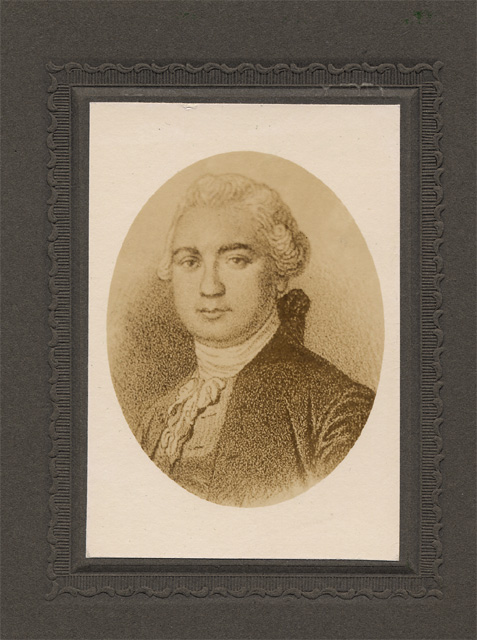
Joseph-Dominique Emmanuel Lemoyne de Longueuil, ~1790

After Bienville's death in 1767, he returned to Quebec. In 1770, Longueuil married Louise Prud'homme. During the American invasion of Quebec, he led a group of Canadian volunteers at Fort Saint-Jean. He was taken prisoner and sent to the United States in November 1775. When he returned to Quebec in 1777, he was named inspector of militia by Governor Sir Guy Carleton. He was also named to the Legislative Council of Lower Canada. Longueuil owned the seigneuries of Soulanges, Nouvelle-Longueuil, and Pointe-à-l’Original, which he had been received from his father. He sold the seigneury of Pointe-à-l’Original in 1784. In 1780, he was named major and, in 1794, became colonel of the Vaudreuil militia. In 1796, he was named lieutenant-colonel for the Royal Canadian Volunteer Regiment.

Longueuil died at home in Montreal of cholera at the age of 68. He left the two remaining seigneuries to his nephew Georges-René Saveuse de Beaujeu, who served in the Legislative Council of the Province of Canada.
