= Pierre Ayotte =

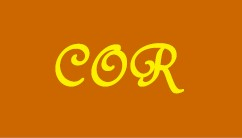
Flag of Congress' Own Canadian Regiment.

Pierre Ayotte was a French-Canadian soldier and fur trader who served with American revolutionary forces during the American Revolutionary War. Ayotte, who was an inhabitant of Kamouraska, was just as devoted to the revolutionary cause as other Quebecois soldiers on the American side of the conflict such as Clément Gosselin, with whom he served in the 2nd Canadian Regiment.

Both Ayotte and Gosselin were Canadian volunteers who first served with General Richard Montgomery, then went on to become recruiters and agitators for American revolutionary groups on the south shore of the lower portion of the Saint Lawrence River. Following Montgomery's death at the Battle of Quebec, the two became captains in Colonel Jeremiah Duggan's Canadian regiment. The Continental Congress subsequently transferred command of the regiment to Moses Hazen. Ayotte helped to raise troops for the American cause and fought at the Battle of Saint-Pierre. He was captured near Quebec City in May 1776.

Once the British surrendered to American forces at the Battle of Yorktown the American Revolutionary war was mostly ended. In 1783, Congress granted Ayotte land in the Lake Champlain area in recognition of his service.
