= Challenge Roth =

Triathlon race in Bavaria, Germany

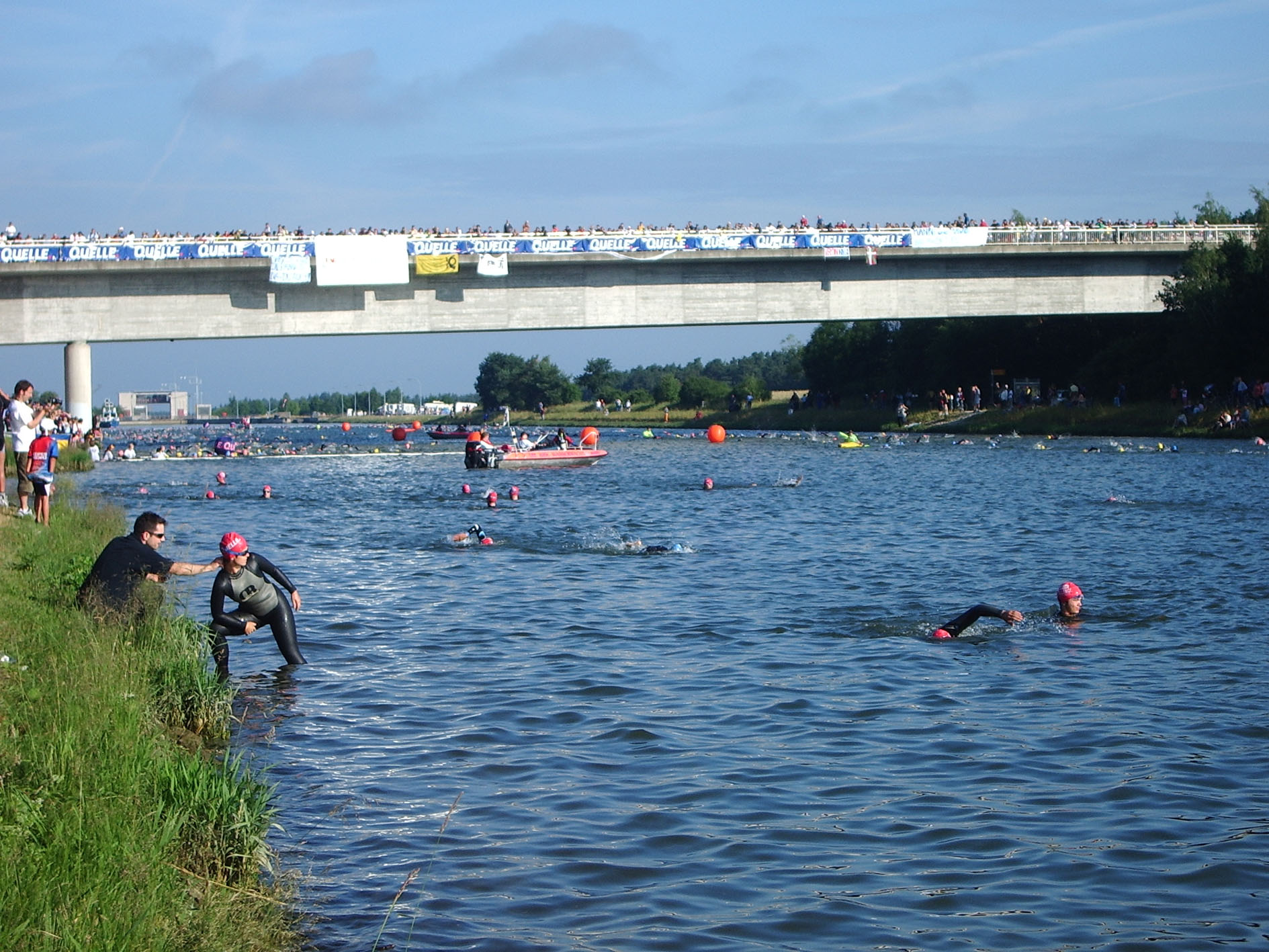
competitors preparing to start the 2005 race

Challenge Roth is a triathlon race organised by in and around Roth, Bavaria, Germany. It is held annually in July.

The Ironman distance (140.6 miles / 226.2 kilometers) version of the race has been held since 1990, and the short distance version since 1984. It was part of the Ironman series until 2001. It has been held independently from WTC since 2002. The number of participants is around 3500 individuals and 650 relay teams.

== Course ==
The first part of the race, the 3.86 km swim event, takes place in the Rhine–Main–Danube Canal around 10 km outside Roth.

The 178.5 km bike ride uses a two-lap course on the countryside, mostly south of Roth. The southernmost point is Greding. The course is mostly relatively flat with a tougher hill once per lap.

The final marathon run goes once around a course with several turning points. Mostly the course goes on the same road after each turning points, so competitors meet each other. A major part of the course is along the Rhine–Main–Danube Canal. The finish is in central Roth.

Course Conditions

In 2021 there were changes in the course which make comparing the results to other years difficult. Because of road construction, the bike portion of the race was shortened from 180km to roughly 170km.

== World records set in Challenge Roth ==
- Men's record: Sam Laidlow, 2026 - 7:21:04
- Women's record: Anne Haug 2024 - 8:02:35

== Results ==
=== Men's results ===
Year	Athlete Name	Country	Swim	Bike	Run	Winning Time
2026	Sam Laidlow	France	46:57	3:54:58	2:36:53	7:21:04
2025	Sam Laidlow	France	46:34	4:03:11	2:37:19	7:29:35
2024	Magnus Ditlev	Denmark	46:23	3:59:25	2:34:18	7:23:24
2023	Magnus Ditlev	Denmark	46:47	3:57:45	2:37:09	7:24:40
2022	Magnus Ditlev	Denmark	50:44	4:01:56	2:40:22	7:35:48
2021	Patrick Lange	Germany	47:28	3:50:32	2:38:30	7:19:19
2019	Andreas Dreitz	Germany	51:28	4:13:12	2:51:11	7:59:02
2018	Sebastian Kienle	Germany	47:59	4:07:29	2:47:45	7:46:23
2017	Bart Aernouts	Belgium	52:55	4:19:02	2:44:10	7:59:07
2016	Jan Frodeno	Germany	45:22	4:08:07	2:39:18	7:35:39
2015	Nils Frommhold	Germany	47:33	4:09:30	2:51:47	7:51:28
2014	Timo Bracht	Germany	48:58	4:19:59	2:44:32	7:56:00
2013	Dirk Bockel	Luxembourg	46:05	4:15:05	2:48:41	7:52:01
2012	James Cunnama	South Africa	47:41	4:29:34	2:40:06	7:59:59
2011	Andreas Raelert	Germany	46:18	4:11:43	2:40:52	7:41:33
2010	Rasmus Henning	Denmark	46:57	4:23:25	2:39:43	7:52:36
2009	Michael Göhner	Germany	50:30	4:21:25	2:41:17	7:55:53
2008	Patrick Vernay	France	48:47	4:30:28	2:47:36	8:09:35
2007	Chris McCormack	Australia	49:45	4:16:31	2:45:12	7:54:23
2006	Chris McCormack	Australia	46:53	4:26:25	2:44:54	8:00:52
2005	Chris McCormack	Australia	47:33	4:23:07	2:45:33	7:58:45

=== Women's results ===
Year	Athlete Name	Country	Swim	Bike	Run	Winning Time
2026	Alanis Siffert	Switzerland	52:03	4:29:19	2:45:00	8:09:09
2025	Laura Philipp	Germany	58:15	4:33:27	2:43:17	8:18:18
2024	Anne Haug	Germany	52:37	4:27:48	2:38:55	8:02:38
2023	Daniela Ryf	Switzerland	50:15	4:22:56	2:51:55	8:08:21
2022	Anne Haug	Germany	58:46	4:33:45	2:46:04	8:22:42
2021	Anne Haug	Germany	52:11	4:14:14	2:43:54	7:53:48
2019	Lucy Charles	(United Kingdom) Great Britain	49:01	4:39:20	2:59:42	8:31:09
2018	Daniela Sämmler	Germany	54:43	4:41:44	3:04:10	8:43:42
2017	Daniela Ryf	Switzerland	52:34	4:37:34	3:06:46	8:40:03
2016	Daniela Ryf	Switzerland	49:10	4:31:29	2:57:40	8:22:04
2015	Yvonne van Vlerken	Netherlands	54:46	4:47:34	3:05:43	8:50:53
2014	Mirinda Carfrae	Australia	55:24	4:46:48	2:53:27	8:38:53
2013	Caroline Steffen	Switzerland	51:45	4:42:21	3:03:07	8:40:35
2012	Rachel Joyce	(United Kingdom) Great Britain	47:37	4:54:37	2:59:53	8:45:04
2011	Chrissie Wellington	(United Kingdom) Great Britain	49:49	4:40:39	2:44:35	8:18:13
2010	Chrissie Wellington	(United Kingdom) Great Britain	50:28	4:36:33	2:48:54	8:19:13
2009	Chrissie Wellington	(United Kingdom) Great Britain	50:28	4:40:28	2:57:32	8:31:59
2008	Yvonne van Vlerken	Netherlands	53:47	4:54:11	2:54:22	8:45:49
2007	Yvonne van Vlerken	Netherlands	57:55	4:51:48	2:58:55	8:51:55
2006	Joanna Lawn	New Zealand	50:56	4:55:59	3:11:21	9:01:17
2005	Belinda Granger	Australia	54:07	4:55:31	3:21:06	9:14:06
