= Anne Haug =

German triathlete

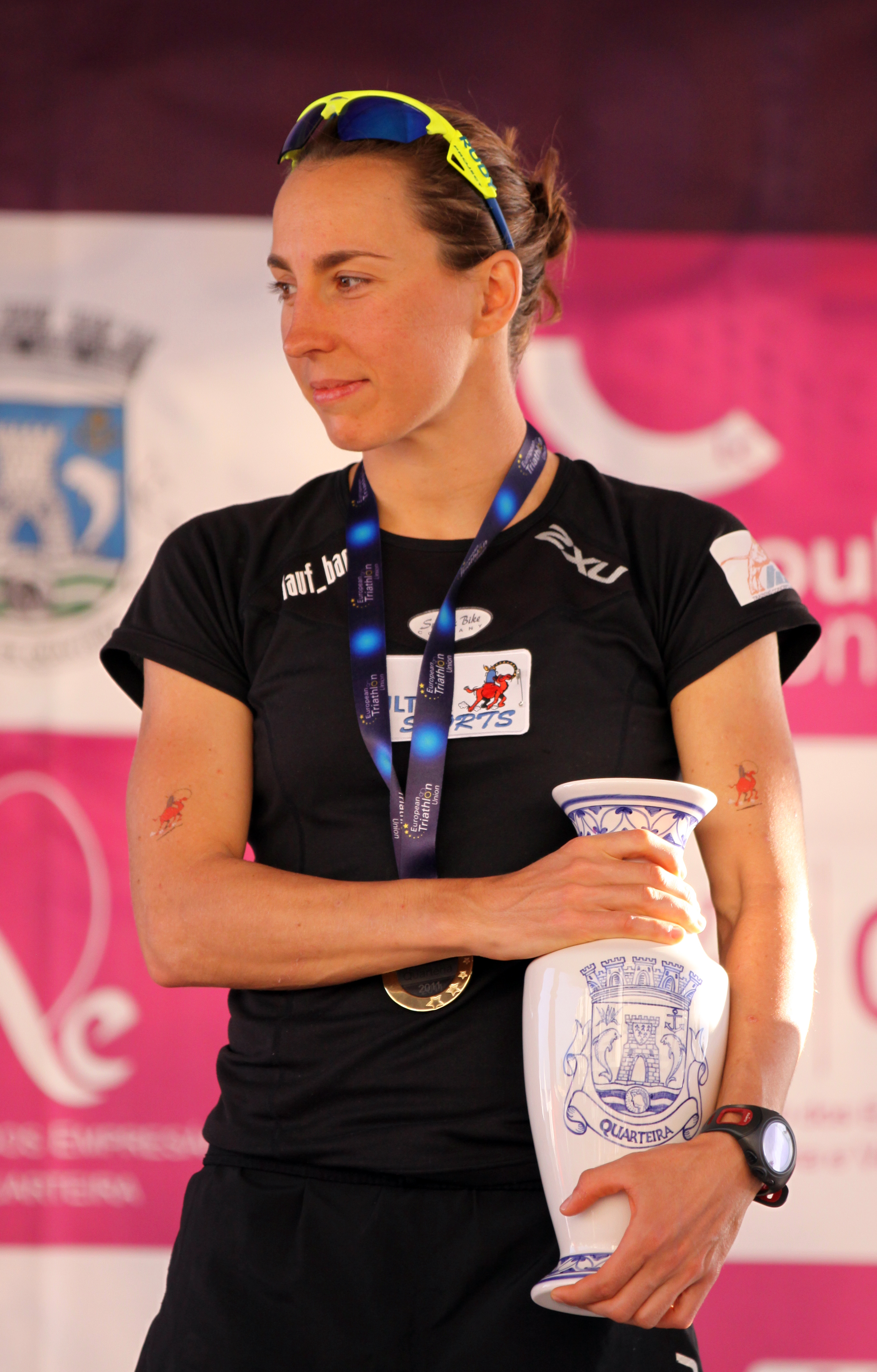
- Haug with her first ITU elite gold medal at the European Cup in Quarteira, 2011

Personal information
- Nationality: German
- Born: 20 January 1983 (age 43) Bayreuth, West Germany
- Height: 1.64 m (5 ft 4 1/2 in)
- Weight: 51 kg (112 lb)
- Website: www.anne-haug.de

Sport
- Country: Germany
- Event: Triathlon

Achievements and titles
- Highest world ranking: Champion
Medal record
Women's triathlon
Representing Germany
Ironman 70.3 World Championship
Bronze medal – third place	2018 South Africa	Individual
Ironman World Championship
Gold medal – first place	2019 Hawaii	Individual
Silver medal – second place	2023 Hawaii	Individual
Bronze medal – third place	2018 Hawaii	Individual
Bronze medal – third place	2021 St George	Individual
Bronze medal – third place	2022 Hawaii	Individual

Anne Haug (born 20 January 1983, in Bayreuth) is a German professional triathlete, Ironman World Championship Champion 2019. National Duathlon Champion of the years 2008 and 2009, and vice Triathlon Champion of the year 2009. She represents the clubs TV 1848 Erlangen, Team Icehouse, and LG Stadtwerke München.

Anne Haug studied sports at the Technical University of Munich (TUM). She lives in Bayreuth and Munich.

In 2012, she competed at the Olympic Games and finished in 11th place.

In 2019, Haug claimed the Ironman World Championship title, finishing in a time of 8:40:10, making her the third-fastest woman in World Championship history.

Haug won Challenge Roth three times: in 2021, 2022 and 2024. Her final win was in the world's best time for a full distance triathlon (3.8 km swim, 180 km bike and 42.2 km run) 8:02:38.

== ITU competitions ==
In the four years from 2007 to 2010, Haug took part in 19 ITU competitions and achieved 14 top ten positions. In 2011, she started the new season with two ITU elite medals: bronze in Antalya and gold in Quarteira.

The following list is based upon the official ITU rankings and the ITU Athletes's Profile Page.

Unless indicated otherwise, the following events are triathlons (Olympic Distance) and belong to the Elite category.

Date	Competition	Place	Rank
2007-02-04	Winter Triathlon European Cup	Oberstaufen	3
2007-02-09	Winter Triathlon European Championships (Age Group 20–24)	Triesenberg	1
2007-06-16	European Cup	Schliersee	18
2007-08-30	BG World Championships (Age Group 20–24)	Hamburg	7
2008-02-22	Winter Triathlon World Championships	Freudenstadt	9
2008-06-21	European Cup	Schliersee	6
2008-06-27	9th World University Triathlon Championship	Erdek	8
2009-02-06	Winter Triathlon European Championships	Latky Mlaky	8
2009-02-13	Winter Triathlon World Championships	Gaishorn	6
2009-05-23	Duathlon European Championships	Budapest	8
2009-08-09	World Cup	Tiszaújváros	33
2009-08-30	Premium European Cup	Kedzierzyn Kozle	3
2009-09-26	Duathlon World Championships	Concord	5
2010-04-18	World Cup	Monterrey	17
2010-05-22	European Cup	Senec	4
2010-06-12	Premium European Cup	Pontevedra	5
2010-08-08	World Cup	Tiszaújváros	45
2010-08-21	Sprint Triathlon World Championships	Lausanne	24
2010-08-29	Premium European Cup	Almere	3
2011-04-03	European Cup	Antalya	3
2011-04-09	European Cup	Quarteira	1

BG = the sponsor British Gas · DNF = did not finish · DNS = did not start
