= Yvonne van Vlerken =

Dutch triathlete (born 1978)

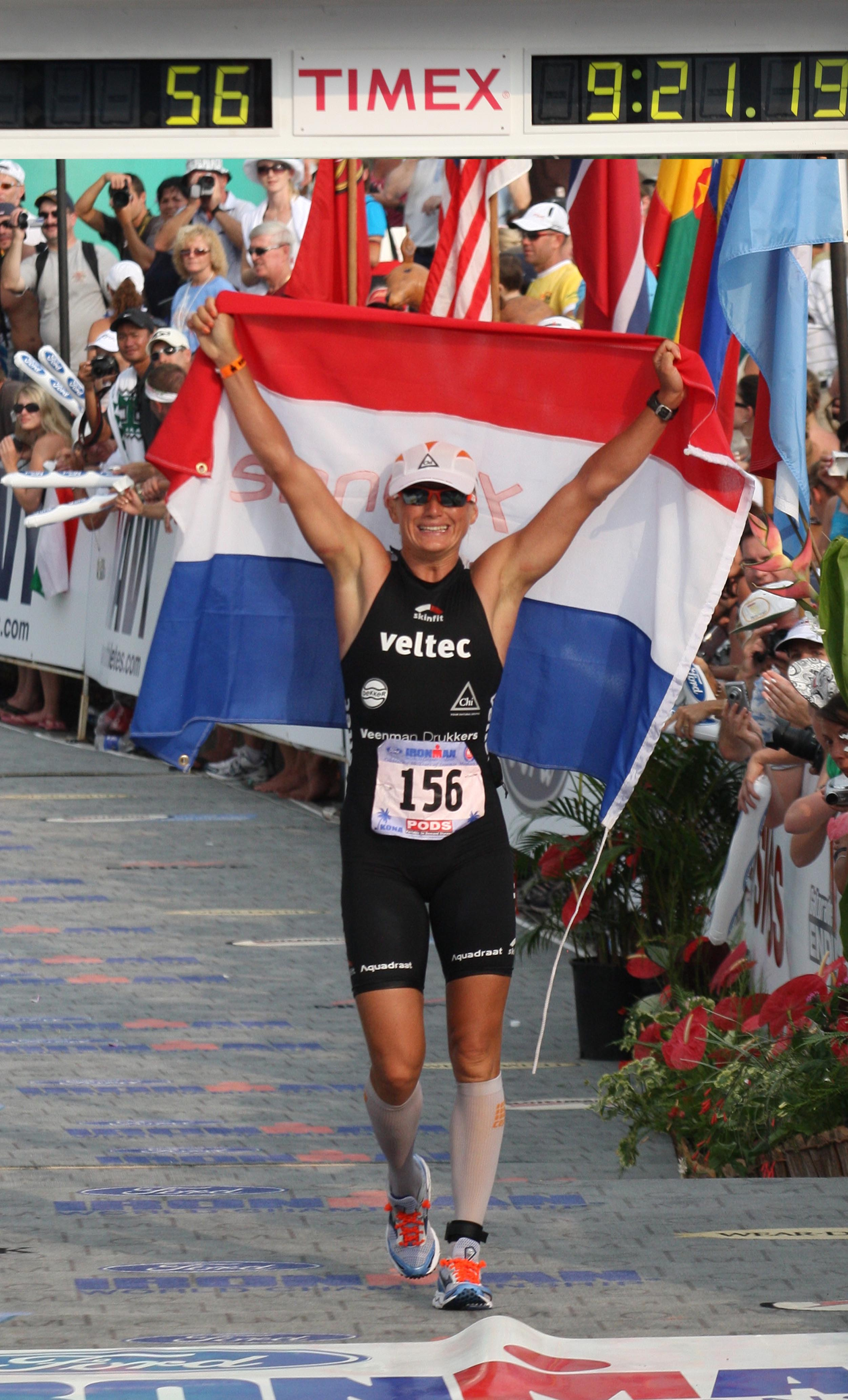
- Yvonne van Vlerken winning silver at the 2008 Ironman world championship

Personal information
- Nickname: The flying Dutchwoman
- Born: 5 November 1978 (age 47) Krimpen aan de Lek, Netherlands
- Height: 1.64 m (5 ft 5 in)
- Weight: 57 kg (126 lb)

Sport
- Country: Netherlands
- Club: Tri Team Lustenau
- Team: Endurance Team Austria
- Turned pro: 2007
- Coached by: Frank Senders Stapsport; Mark Allen
Medal record
Women's triathlon
Ironman World Championships
Silver medal – second place	2008 Kailua-Kona	Individual
Women's duathlon
ITU Long Distance Duathlon World Championships
Gold medal – first place	2006	Individual
Bronze medal – third place	2007	Individual
Bronze medal – third place	2008	Individual
Powerman Duathlon European Championships
Gold medal – first place	2006	Individual
Gold medal – first place	2009	Individual
Silver medal – second place	2005	Individual
Silver medal – second place	2008	Individual
Bronze medal – third place	2007	Individual

Yvonne van Vlerken (born 5 November 1978) is a Dutch triathlete and duathlete, twice winner of Quelle Challenge Roth, who in 2008 set a world record for Ironman-distance triathlon races. She is one of a small group of female triathletes to have recorded three or more sub-9 hour times over the Ironman distance.

== Early life ==
Yvonne van Vlerken was born in the small town of Krimpen aan de Lek near Gouda on 5 November 1978. Her father was an "excellent" football player, and she also became a footballer, playing for the South Holland team. After attending high school she graduated from a fitness-specific school with a degree in fitness coaching, professional aerobic instruction and sports massage therapy. Van Vlerken worked in her home town for over 13 years. Her clients included school children for dance education and older people for fitness coaching.

== Athletic career ==
On 13 July 2008, van Vlerken set a then new world record of 8:45:48 for Ironman-distance races at the Quelle Challenge Roth, more than five minutes faster than Paula Newby-Fraser's world record time of 8:50:53, which had stood for 14 years. The race took place in wet and cold conditions with non-stop rain and wind. Yvonne van Vlerken broke the old record with the then second-fastest female Ironman-distance marathon time of 2:54:22. Her record stood for a year, until it was again broken in Roth by Chrissie Wellington, who lowered it by 13 minutes and 49 seconds, in dry and perfect conditions.

Yvonne van Vlerken's other accomplishments include:

- Recorded a sub-9 hour finish (8:51:55) at her Ironman-distance debut in Roth 2007.
- The only female athlete in history who has held the world record for both the half-Ironman distance (4:07:29 at 2006 Ironman 70.3 Antwerp) and the full Ironman distance (8:45:48 at 2008 Challenge Roth)
