= Michel Blais =

Michel Blais (Blay) (c. 1711 – 5 September 1783) was a Canadian born militia Captain and a co-seigneur.

The son of Pierre Blais and Françoise Baudoin, Blais was a landowner in a seigneury of Saint-Pierre-de-la-Rivière-du-Sud. In 1741, he married Marie-Françoise Lizot. He was the father of Louis Blais who also was actively involved in the militia.

Although Blais remained loyal to the British government, in January 1776, he announced at the local church that a Pierre Ayotte was recruiting for the American side; it was later said that no one showed up. In March of that year, Blais' house became the headquarters for the royalist advance guard. The house was attacked by the Americans in what was to be known as the Battle of Saint-Pierre; three British supporters were killed, several were wounded and many were captured.

Blais died at Saint-Pierre-de-la-Rivière-du-Sud in 1783.
