= Laguna Phuket Triathlon =

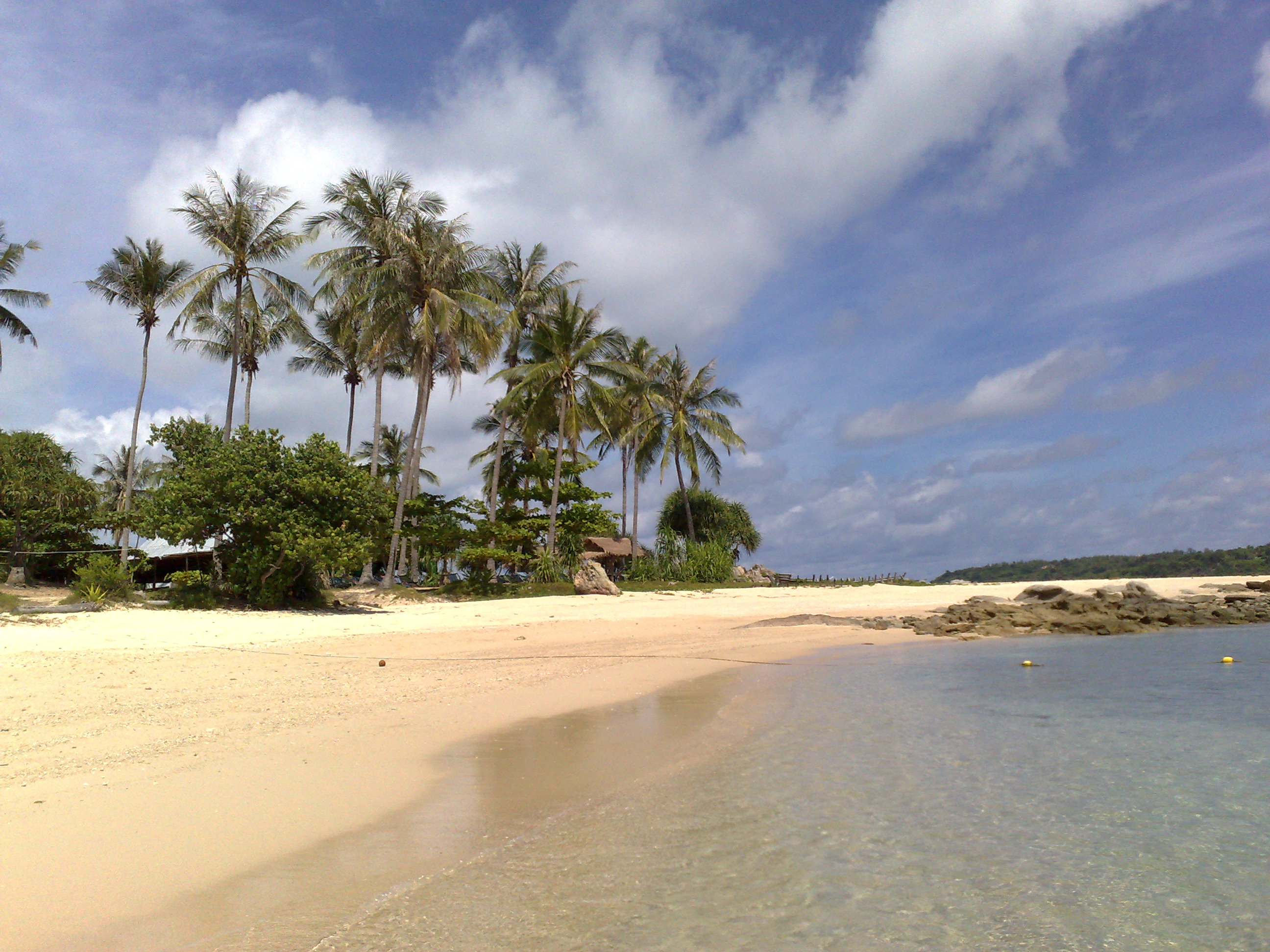

The Laguna Phuket Triathlon (LPT) is a triathlon competition. The race was created in 1994 by IMG, Laguna Phuket Resorts and PCH Sports and is Asia's longest running triathlon event. LPT's race distances of 1.8K swim, 50K bike and 12K run are designed to provide participants with a unique challenge and to showcase the venue. LPT's bike course is one of the race's most outstanding features for its scenic view along the route and the challenging, hilly parts. Originally the bike course distance was 55K but has been changed to 50K, and going in reverse direction, from 2016 to give athletes new race experience. The race partnered with Ironman in 2010 - 2012 and Challenge Family in 2013 - 2015, offering 2 triathlon races on 2 consecutive Sundays back-to-back in late November - early December during the 6 years. From 2016, Laguna Phuket Triathlon returns to its standalone status.

LPT's list of champions includes Mike Pigg, Paula Newby-Fraser, Mark Allen, Simon Lessing, Greg Welch, Michellie Jones, Craig Alexander, Carol Montgomery, and Samantha McGlone.

== Location ==
The Laguna Phuket Resort occupies 600 acres (2.4 km^{2}) of tropical beachfront parkland on the northwest coast of Phuket island in southern Thailand.
