= Louis Blais =

Canadian politician

Louis Blais (January 7, 1755 – May 15, 1838) was a farmer and political figure in Lower Canada. He represented Hertford in the Legislative Assembly of Lower Canada from 1800 to 1804.

He was born in Saint-Pierre-de-la-Rivière-du-Sud, the son of Michel Blais and Marie-Françoise Lizotte. Blais was a captain in the militia, later reaching the rank of major. He did not run for reelection to the assembly in 1804. He was married twice: first to Marie-Gabriel Roy, the sister of Étienne-Ferréol Roy, in 1781 and then to Marie-Anne Bossé in 1786. Blais died in Saint-Pierre-de-la-Rivière-du-Sud at the age of 83.
