= Georges-René Saveuse de Beaujeu =

Canadian politician (1810–1865)

Georges-René Saveuse de Beaujeu, Comte de Beaujeu
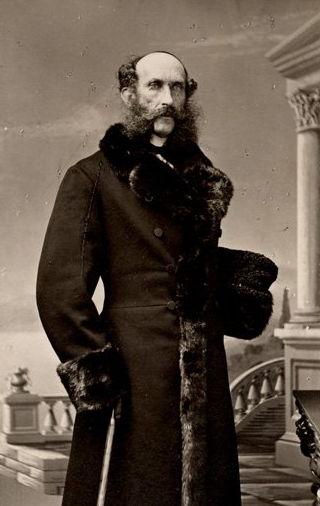

Member of the Legislative Council of the Province of Canada
- In office 1848–1865

Personal details
- Born: June 4, 1810 Montreal, Lower Canada
- Died: July 29, 1865 (aged 55) Coteau-du-Lac, Canada East
- Children: Georges-Raoul-Léotale-Guichart-Humbert Saveuse de Beaujeu

Georges-René Saveuse de Beaujeu, Comte de Beaujeu (French pronunciation: [ʒɔʁʒ ʁəne savøz də boʒø]; June 4, 1810 – July 29, 1865) was a seigneur and political figure in Canada East.

He was born in Montreal in 1810, the son of seigneur Jacques-Philippe Saveuse de Beaujeu and Catherine Chaussegros de Léry, daughter of Gaspard-Joseph Chaussegros de Léry. He studied at the Collège de Montréal. After his father's death from cholera in 1832, he inherited the fief of Nouvelle-Longueuil and the seigneury of Soulanges. Later that year, he married Adélaïde, the daughter of seigneur Philippe-Joseph Aubert de Gaspé. In 1848, he was appointed to the Legislative Council of the Province of Canada. He was elected to the same council for Rigaud division in 1858 and 1862 after it became an elected body. Saveuse de Beaujeu also served as lieutenant-colonel in the militia and was president of the Société Saint-Jean-Baptiste of Montreal. He helped found the Société Historique de Montréal in 1858.

He died at Coteau-du-Lac in 1865.

His son Georges-Raoul-Léotale-Guichart-Humbert later served in the Canadian House of Commons.
