= Rural Reconstruction Nepal =

Rural Reconstruction Nepal (RRN)
- नेपाल ग्रामीण पुनर्निर्माण संस्था
- Formation: 1993
- Type: Non Governmental Organization
- Location: Kathmandu
- President: Mr. Hari Tamang
- Website: http://www.rrn.org.np

Rural Reconstruction Nepal (RRN) (Nepali: नेपाल ग्रामीण पुनर्निर्माण संस्था) is a non-government, not for profit, social development organisation in Nepal, initiated in 1989 in the form of a small organisation created by a group of creative graduates of the Institute of Agriculture and Animal Science in Chitwan district with its initial name 'Grass Roots Institute for Training and Services-Nepal (GRITS-Nepal)'. By subscribing to the basic principles of the International Rural Reconstruction Movement, GRITS-Nepal was renamed and officially registered in 1993 as Rural Reconstruction Nepal (RRN). With the passage of time, RRN has been able to expand itself into one of the fast-growing NGOs in the country together with its diverse development programmes covering the vast geographical area and the population.

RRN enjoys the Special Consultative Status with the United Nations Economic and Social Council (ECOSOC) of the United Nations since 1997 and is also accredited to the Global Environment Facility (GEF), the UN Framework Convention on Climate Change (UNFCCC), and the Green Climate Fund (GCF). Currently, it is hosting the Regional Secretariat of the South Asia Alliance for Poverty Eradication (SAAPE) , and the International Secretariat of LDC Watch .

Since its inception, RRN has been working with the poor and marginalised people in rural Nepal to facilitate them in the process of meeting their basic needs, improving livelihoods and building their own institutions. It contributes to rural people's empowerment and socio-economic reconstruction process, by embracing the rights-based approaches to development. RRN is also committed to creating an enabling environment for building a just, equitable, peaceful and prosperous society through social, economic and political empowerment of the rural poor, particularly the poor rural women, peasants, landless people and other disadvantaged and socially oppressed strata of Nepalese society.

RRN implements integrated community development programmes and projects on sustainable rural livelihoods, sustainable agriculture, water, sanitation and hygiene (WASH), child and adult education, biodiversity conservation, disaster risk reduction (DRR) and climate change, community infrastructure development and support to local governments for governance strengthening and service delivery. RRN also provides emergency relief, recovery support and implements reconstruction projects targeting to the disaster-affected people.

Besides implementing integrated community development programmes at the grassroots, it is also engaged in advocacy, lobbying and networking at local, national and international levels for the cause of protecting and promoting human rights and social justice.

In the post-conflict context of Nepal, RRN has positioned itself to facilitate in conflict transformation initiatives by adopting the approach that strongly focuses on institutionalising democracy and peace-building through reconstruction, rehabilitation and reconciliation - RRR process. In order to successfully embark on such a significant process, RRN considers such key aspects - people's genuine participation, gender equality and social inclusion, transparency, accountability, social justice, coordination and collaboration, and community's demand, community ownership over the interventions and sustainability as its strategies.

== Core Beliefs ==
- The rural poor in Nepal, as elsewhere in the world, are confronted by four basic and interrelated problems: poverty, ignorance, disease and civic inertia.
- Because the rural poor comprise two-thirds of the world's population in the developing world; hence, social peace is likely to always remain as an unattainable dream unless these rural poor are able to solve their basic problems and achieve a standard of living equal to that of the rest of the society.
- The rural poor have the potential power for self-development, what they lack is the opportunity to release and develop this power.
- The rural poor also have personal dignity and should be regarded with respect, not pity.

== Four Fold Approach ==
RRN focuses all its development programmes on the four-fold approach of Rural Reconstruction as the foundation upon which its programme and project activities are based. The focus lies on the following four key building blocks:

- Education and awareness - to combat illiteracy, and provide exposure to the outside world
- Livelihood - to fight poverty and hunger
- Health - to prevent disease, and promote rights to health
- Self-Government - to overcome

== RRN's Credo ==
RRN subscribes to the philosophy and principles of the International Rural Reconstruction Movement, which are encapsulated in the following credo:

- Go to the people
- Live among them
- Learn from them
- Plan with them
- Work with them
- Start with what they know
- Build on what they have
- Teach by showing
- Learn by doing
- Not a showcase but a pattern
- Not odds and ends but a system
- Not piecemeal but an integrated approach
- Not to conform but to transform
- Not relief but release

== RRN's Working Districts ==
RRN is implementing diverse community development programmes and projects in several districts of the country; covering the Mountain, Hills and Lowlands (Tarai) ecological zones.

Province No. 1

- Taplejung, Tehrathum, Sankhuwasabha, Morang, Sunsari districts.

Province No. 2

- Saptari, Siraha, Dhanusha, Mahottari, Sarlahi, Rautahat, Bara and Parsa districts.

Province No. 3

- Dolakha, Chitwan and Makwanpur districts.

Karnali

- Salyan, Jajarkot, Kalikot, Jumla, Dolpa, Mugu and Humla districts.

Sudur-Pashchim

- Achham, Bajura and Bajhang districts.
