= Giorgio Blais =

Italian army general (1935–2026)

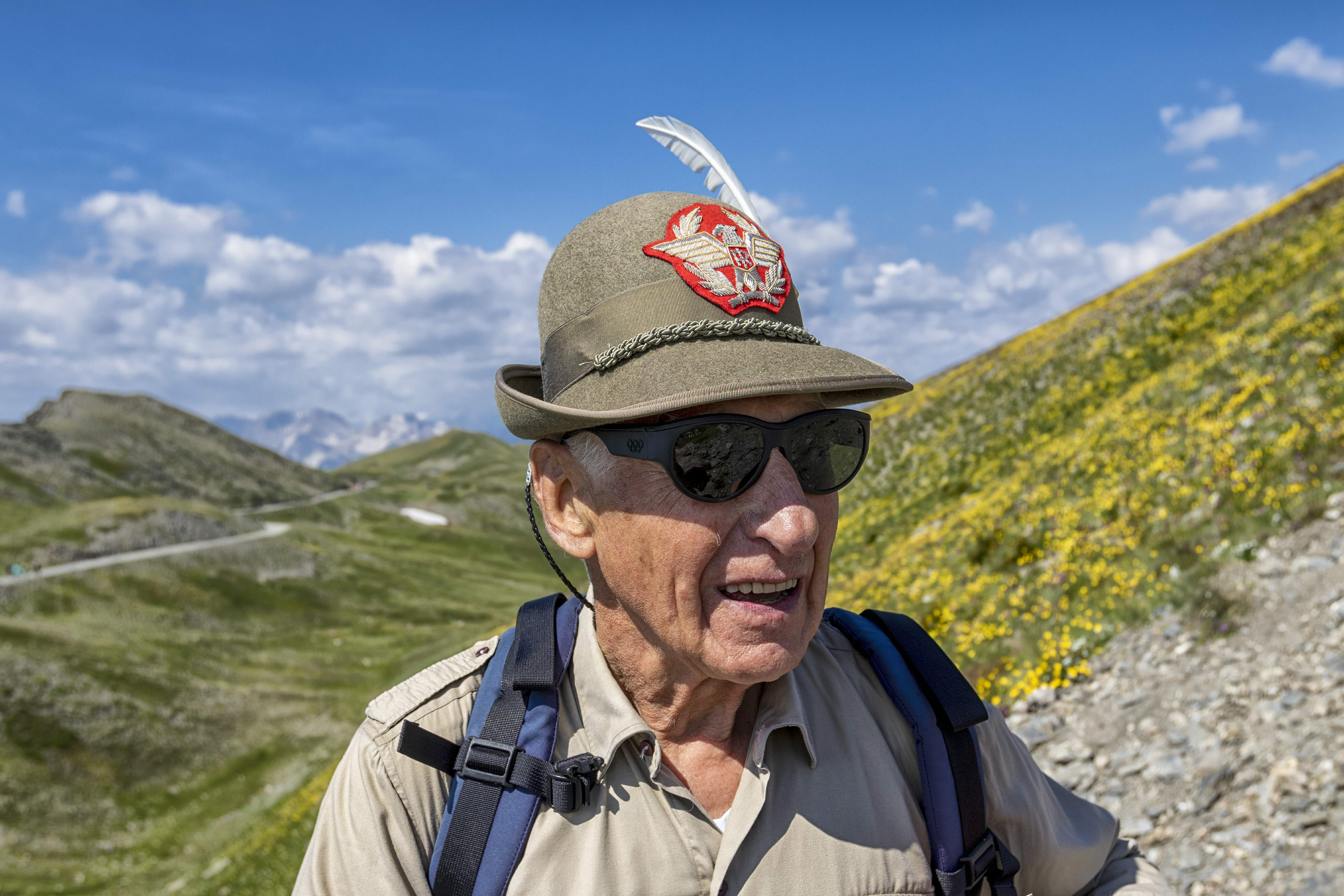
- Born: 14 April 1935; Turin, Italy
- Died: 24 August 2026 (aged 91); Susa, Piedmont, Italy
- Spouse: Maria Grazia Antonetto
- Children: Mario, Cristina
- Military career
- Allegiance: Italy
- Branch: Army
- Service years: 1953–1993
- Rank: Major-General
- Awards: Grand Officer Order of Merit of the Italian Republic

Giorgio Blais (14 April 1935 – 24 August 2026) was an Italian major-general of the Italian Army, risen to public notoriety for having crossed, on foot and alone during summer of 2000, Italy from Piedmont down to Sicily.

Blais started on 16 June from the top of Rocciamelone, and after a journey. of 1700 km he arrived on 5 August at the flank of Mount Etna. The goal of this enterprise, which he defined as "my reckless walk through Italy", was to bring a message of brotherhood and Italianness to the 42 stopover towns. For this endeavor, he was appointed Grand Officer by the President of Italy Carlo Azeglio Ciampi on 27 December 2003.

== Biography ==
During his career, he has served in the Brigades Taurinense, Cadore, Orobica, Julia as well as in the Central Offices in Rome. He had a military paratrooper's license and a 2nd degree civilian pilot's license. He worked for about nine years in international missions in the Balkans, an area of which he claimed expertise.

For four years he was Director of Military Studies at the International Institute of Humanitarian Law (1994–1998), and for eight years (1999–2007) Vice-President of the same Institute. Between 2011 and 2014 he directed human rights and international humanitarian law courses for Iraqi and Kurdish government officials in Baghdad and Erbil (sponsored program of the Italian Ministry of Foreign Affairs). He was professor of "methodology of documentation" at the Italian Institute of Publicism (1977–1982).

The 25th anniversary of his "walk" was commemorated by the weekly La Valsusa, which dedicated an entire page to him.

Blais died on 24 August 2026, at the age of 91.

== Awards ==
- Commander Order of Merit of the Italian Republic on 27 December 1986.
- Grand Officer Order of Merit of the Italian Republic on 27 December 2003.
- Honorary citizenship awarded by the city of Susa on 1 December 2025.
