= Clément Gosselin =

French-Canadian American soldier of the American Revolution (1747-1816)

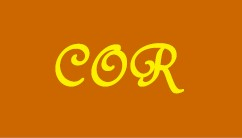
- Congress's Own Regiment
- Born: June 12, 1747; Sainte-Famille, Québec
- Died: March 9, 1816 (aged 68); Beekmantown, New York, U.S.
- Military career
- Branch: Continental Army
- Service years: 1775–1783
- Rank: Major
- Unit: 2nd Canadian Regiment
- Conflicts: American Revolutionary War; Battle of Quebec; Battle of Saint-Pierre; Siege of Yorktown
- Awards: Original Member of the Society of Cincinnati

Clément Gosselin (June 12, 1747 – March 9, 1816) was a French Canadian soldier who served in Moses Hazen's 2nd Canadian Regiment of the Continental Army during the American Revolutionary War. He recruited other French Canadians, assisted in American operations during and after the Battle of Quebec, and, following the American retreat from Quebec in 1776, continued to serve in Hazen's regiment. Included in that service were spy missions to the province of Quebec.

== Early life ==
Clément Gosselin was born in 1747. He was the youngest of a large family living in Sainte-Famille, on the eastern side of Île d'Orléans east of the city of Quebec. At the time of the British invasion of 1759, Gosselin was twelve years old.

== Role in the American Revolution ==
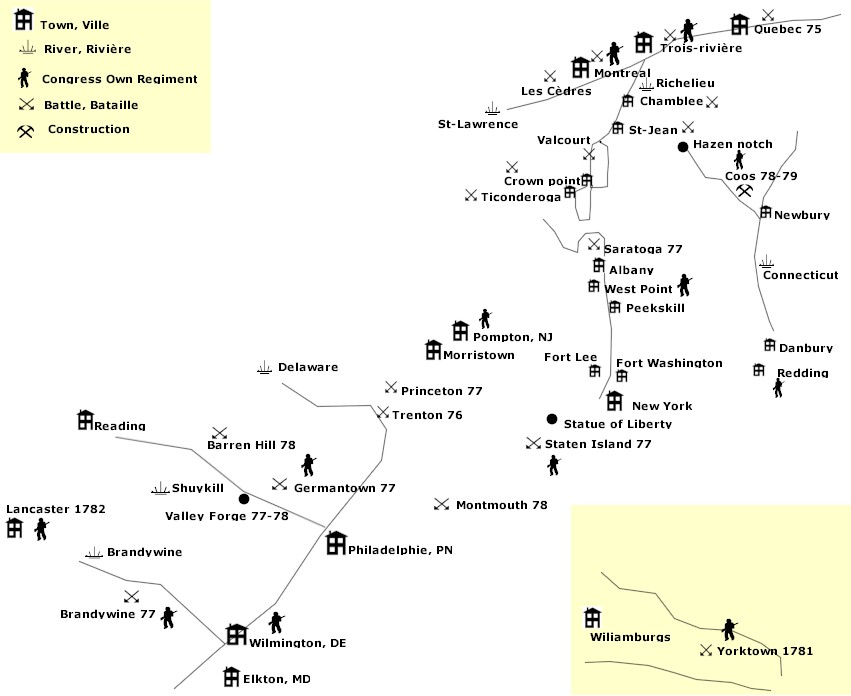
Movement of the COR Regiment

Gosselin participated in the American attack on Quebec City on December 31, 1775, probably serving in James Livingston's 1st Canadian Regiment. In March 1776 Gosselin joined Moses Hazen's 2nd Canadian Regiment as the Captain of the 7th Company. He took part in the Battle of Saint-Pierre on March 25, 1776, when 150 pro-American Canadians and 80 Americans defeated 150 pro-British Canadians recruited by Daniel Liénard de Beaujeu. When the Continental Army retreated from Quebec in May 1776, Gosselin went into hiding in Canada, not reappearing until August 1777, 15 months later. He was taken prisoner by the British in October 1777 and released eight months later in June 1778.

In May 1778, he rejoined Hazen's regiment with his father-in-law, Germain Dionne, and his older brother, Louis Gosselin. On November 28, 1778, Gosselin, following a spy mission to Quebec, sent a report on the state of the British force in Canada to Washington. In April 1779, he went with Moses Hazen to build a proposed invasion route from the "Coos Country" of northern New Hampshire (then part of the disputed New Hampshire Grants, which eventually became the state of Vermont) into Canada. Known as the Bayley-Hazen Military Road, it was never completed. In 1780, his regiment was sent to Albany to guard the frontier from Iroquois attack. In June 1781, he was in Fishkill east of the Hudson River, just below West Point. There his regiment received orders to proceed to Yorktown in the south. On October 4, 1781, he was severely wounded in the leg during the Siege of Yorktown, due to wood splinters sent flying by a cannonball.

== After the war ==
In January 1782 Clément was stationed in Lancaster, Pennsylvania to guard prisoners captured at Yorktown. In 1783 he was discharged and given a Major's pension. He was also given a land grant of 1000 acres at Chazy, near Lake Champlain in New York state.

He was with General von Steuben in Newburg, New York, to receive his membership in The Society of the Cincinnati.

He moved to Saint-Hyacinthe, Lower Canada in early 1791, where he married his third wife, Marie Catherine Monty on May 12 of that year; Marie Catherine was the daughter of one of the Lieutenants, Francois Monty, who had served under him in Hazen's Regiment. He then moved to Sainte-Marguerite-de-Blairfindie around 1800 and then to Saint-Luc in 1803. From 1815 on, Gosselin was living in Clinton County, New York until his death in Beekmantown.

== Media ==
Gosselin was featured in the CBC Television series Canada: A People's History as one of a number of French-Canadians who not only sympathized with the American cause, but was willing to fight for them against the British.
