= Jon Blais =

American triathlete (1971–2007)

Jon Blais (August 30, 1971 – May 27, 2007), also known as Blazeman, was an American triathlete noted for his fight against amyotrophic lateral sclerosis (ALS) and is the namesake of the Blazeman Foundation.

== Struggle with ALS and death ==
Born and raised in Seekonk, Massachusetts, Blais moved to San Diego, California, because of its reputation as a triathlon mecca and to work with learning disabled and at risk students. On May 2, 2005, at age 33, he was diagnosed with amyotrophic lateral sclerosis (ALS), also known as Lou Gehrig's disease or motor neurone disease, a progressive disease in which the nerve cells controlling voluntary muscle movement degenerate and die off. He was permitted to enter the 2005 Ironman Triathlon in Hawaii, a lifelong dream. As Blais put it, "Finishing the race is huge for me. No one is beating ALS. No one has done anything but walk away and die." His resolve to finish the race was unwavering as he stated, "Even if I have to be rolled across the finish line, I'm finishing." With a total time of 16:28:56, more than half an hour before the cutoff, he "log-rolled" across the finish line and is the first person diagnosed with ALS to start and finish this race. He died on May 27, 2007. Various international triathletes have later honored Blais and showed their support for the fight against ALS by doing a "Blazeman roll" across the Ironman finish line.

== Blazeman Foundation ==
The Blazeman Foundation is a non-profit organization that raises money internationally to foster awareness of and research on ALS. Branding itself as the "Multi-Sport Movement To End Lou Gehrig's Disease," the organization was founded in 2007 by friends and family of Jon Blais. As a popular money-raising cause and "reason to race" for professional and amateur triathletes, the organization is the subject of frequent press coverage in local news outlets around the world and in media devoted to running, swimming, bicycling, and triathlon competition.

The organization operates under the leadership of Jon Blais' parents, Bob and Mary Ann Blais, his sister, Jennifer Murphy, and friends. Supporters include leading Ironman competitors, such as Chrissie Wellington, Leanda Cave, Andy Potts, Mirinda Carfrae, Matt Reed, Bryan Rhodes, and Scott Tinley. In 2011 these star triathletes were featured in a music video to raise money for the foundation.

Exemplifying the passion amateur athletes have for the cause, 18-year-old "Blaze Kid" Jennifer Hansen had raised almost $30,000 for the organization before reaching eligibility for her first Ironman event in 2011. The San Francisco athlete said the disease hit home with her in 2009 when a beloved basketball coach was diagnosed with ALS.

Research funding from the foundation has been awarded to Wake Forest University Baptist Medical Center ($11,300 in 2011), Northwestern University Feinberg School of Medicine ($400,000 committed through 2012), and the University of Maryland, where the organization will be supporting the university's Brain and Tissue Bank in setting up a program for ALS patients to donate their tissue postmortem for research.
