= Frank Horwill =

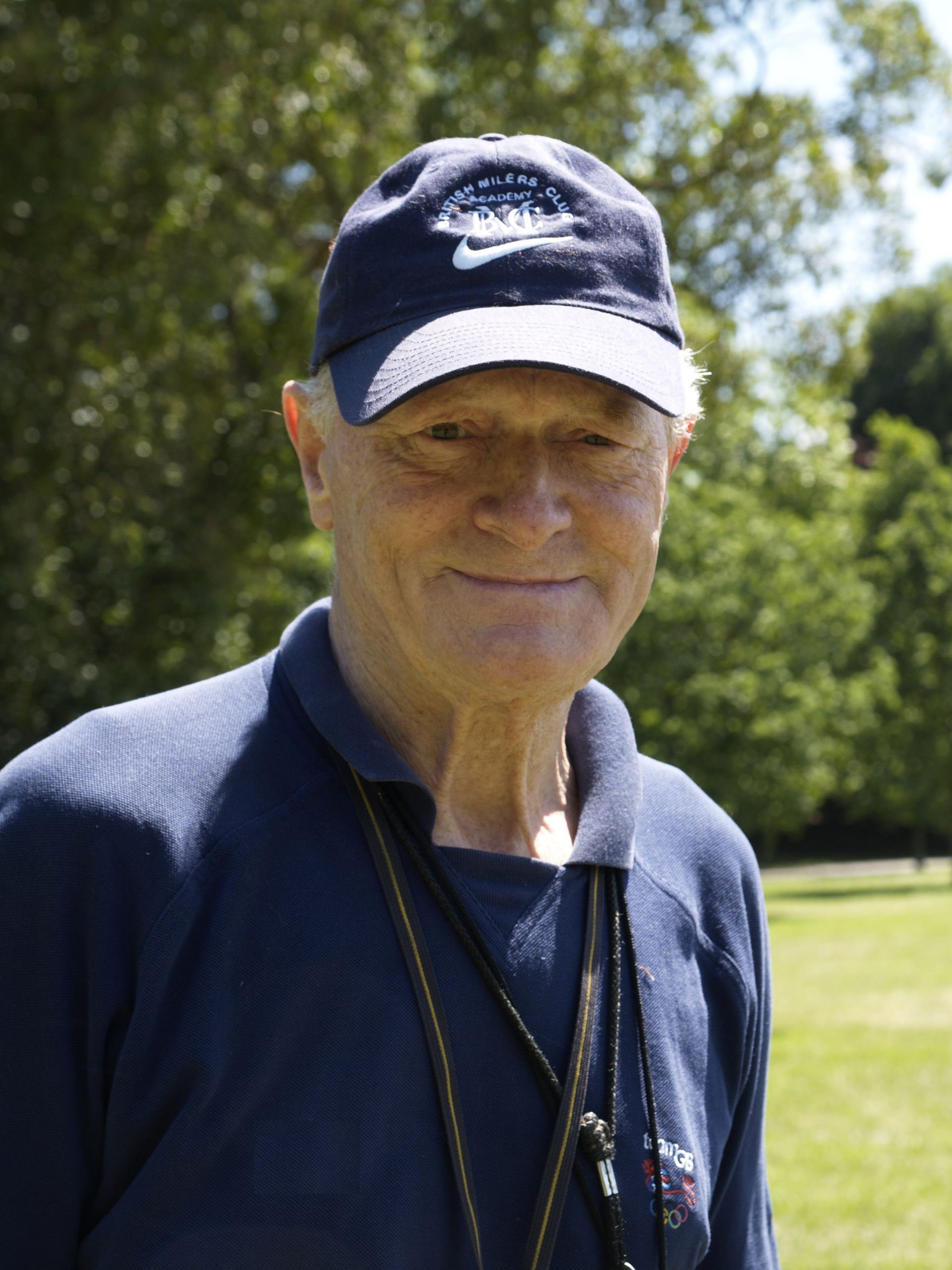
Frank Horwill in 2005

Frank J. Horwill MBE (19 June 1927 – 1 January 2012) was a UK Athletics senior level 4 coach most famous for founding the British Milers' Club (BMC) and for formulating the Five Pace Training Theory which is widely used for coaching middle-distance runners throughout the world.

As a volunteer coach since 1961, Horwill coached over 50 Great Britain and Northern Ireland international athletes from 800 metres to the marathon – from track to the road and to the country. Five of his athletes achieved sub-4-minute miles – the fastest being Tim Hutchings, who ran 3:54.53 for the mile and placed fourth in the 5000m in the 1984 Los Angeles Olympic Games.

In 1963 Horwill co-founded the British Milers' Club with the aim of raising "British middle distance running to world supremacy". Seventeen years after the BMC was formed, British male middle-distance runners held all the middle-distance world records. This was attributed to the first ever national scheme of using 'hares' in races. The club has been the nursery and arena for many champions over the years, with the great majority of Britain's best middle distance runners being members and Horwill was an active member of the club's committee until his death.

While the training of middle and long distance runners at the time were dominated by physiological thinking (and later biochemical), Horwill's Five Pace Training Theory used elements of 'style running' of the 1920s and '30s, i.e. he applied motor learning theory to running. In physiological terms, he was convinced that running economy was best when one had learned a certain speed. In contrast to the runners of previous generations he increased the amount of high quality running.

In 1970 Horwill invented the 5-pace/multi-tier system of training, used by Sebastian Coe to enormous success under his father and coach Peter Coe. In 1980, Peter Coe said, "we have used Frank Horwill's multi-tier system. It's all embracing."

Many other prominent athletes have also adopted the 5-pace system of training including Saïd Aouita who was the only man at the time capable of running 800m in sub 1:44, 1500m in sub 3:30, 3000m in sub 7:30, 5000m in sub 13:00, and 10000m in sub 27:30 and Noah Ngeny, the 2000 Sydney Olympic 1,500m champion.

Horwill was widely respected in athletics circles throughout the world and lectured and coached internationally, including in Canada, Ireland, Poland, Zimbabwe, Kenya, Bahrain, Portugal and South Africa. The latter country held a special affection in his heart and on his frequent visits he was sought out for advice by aspiring South African middle distance athletes and coaches. He helped and influenced countless athletes and coaches worldwide by correspondence and coached a large squad of runners, "Horwill's Harriers", in London.

A prolific writer, Horwill regularly produced articles for the British magazine Athletics Weekly, and other sporting publications. He co-authored The Complete Middle Distance Runner (1972), along with Denis Watts and Harry Wilson. In 1991, Frank Horwill published Obsession for Running, described by The Daily Telegraph as "The athletics book of the year". Owen Anderson in Peak Performance called it "an outstanding book".

Horwill was a man of many quotes including, "We've only just begun to work"; "Anyone can run fast repetitions and have a cup of tea and a doughnut after each repetition!"; "Keep going, keep going, keep going, until a little something inside you says, 'keep going'". Track side, at the 200m mark at BMC meetings he was heard to say, "If you can't go faster than that, get off the track!"

Horwill was appointed Member of the Order of the British Empire (MBE) in the 2011 Birthday Honours for voluntary service to sport. Horwill died on 1 January 2012. He was 84.
