= MOBA Mobile Automation =

MOBA Mobile Automation AG
- MOBA Automation logo
- Type: AG
- Industry: Mobile automation, equipment technology and overload systems
- Founded: 1972, in Germany
- Headquarters: Limburg, Germany
- Area served: Europe, America, Asia & Oceania
- Key people: Volker Harms (CEO); Holger Barthel (Vice President)
- Number of employees: 800
- Subsidiaries: 17
- Website: mobile-automation.eu

MOBA Mobile Automation AG is a German worldwide company in mobile automation, equipment technology and overload systems.

== Media gallery ==
MOBA Automation at EXCON 2025
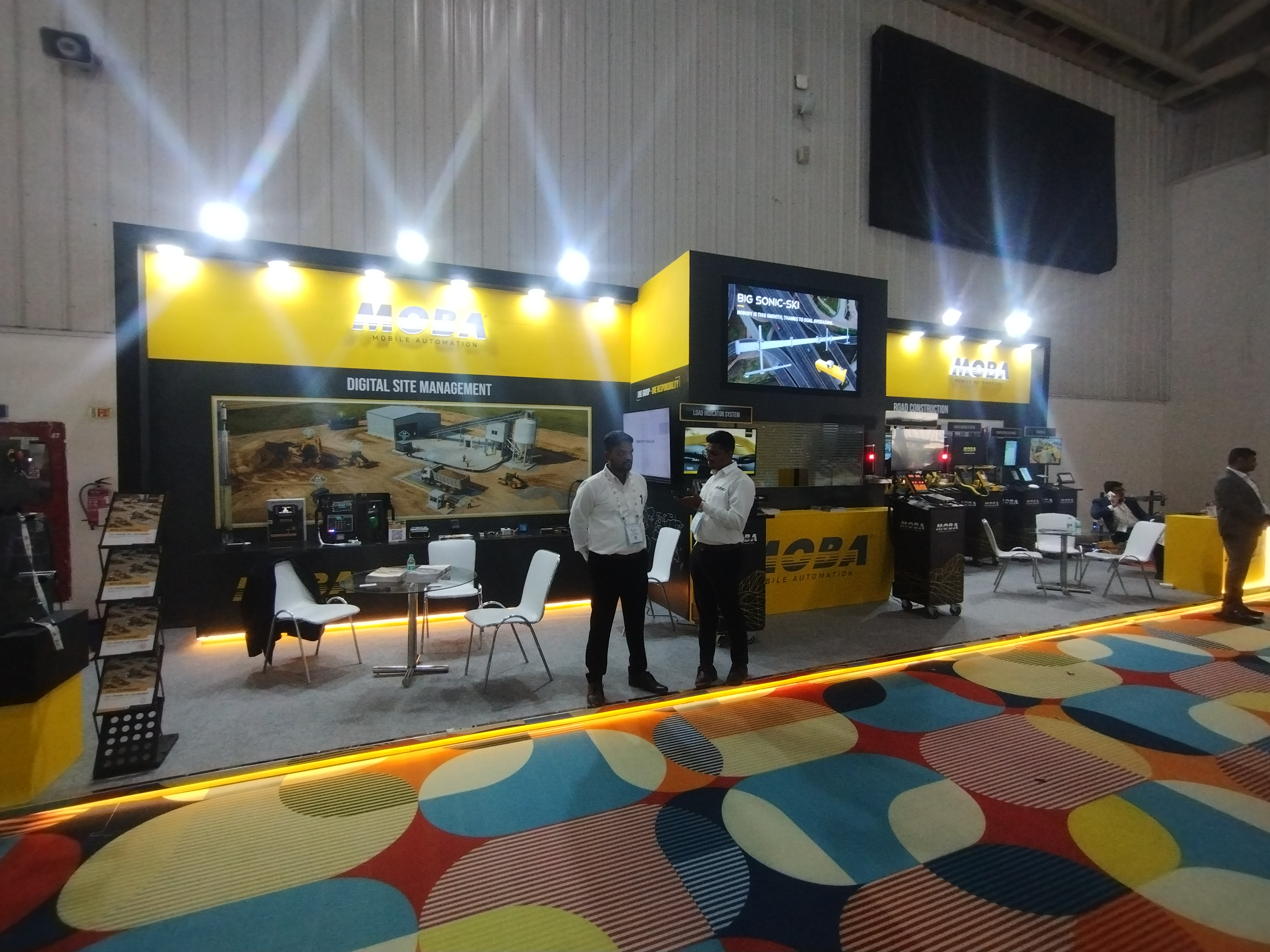

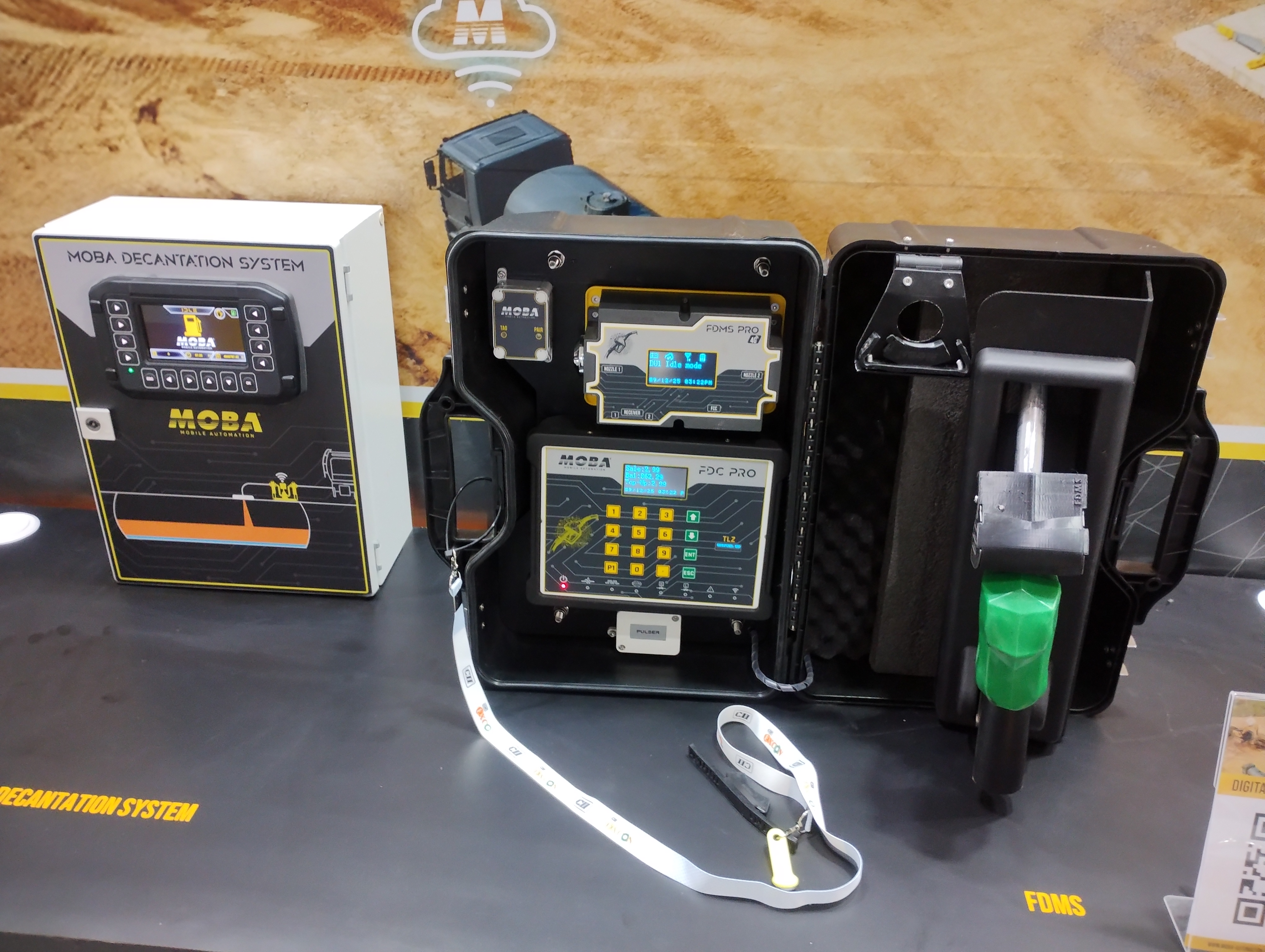

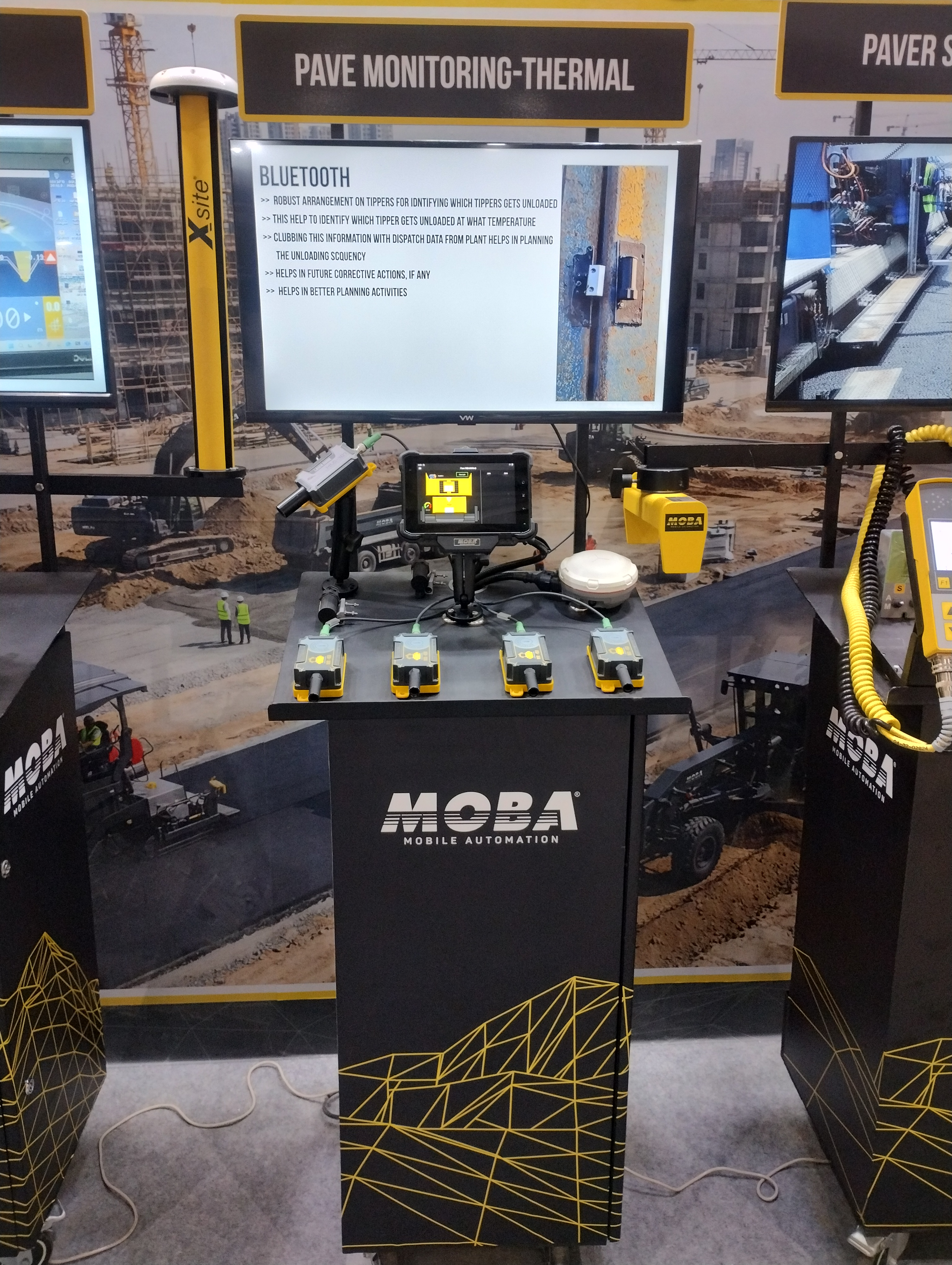

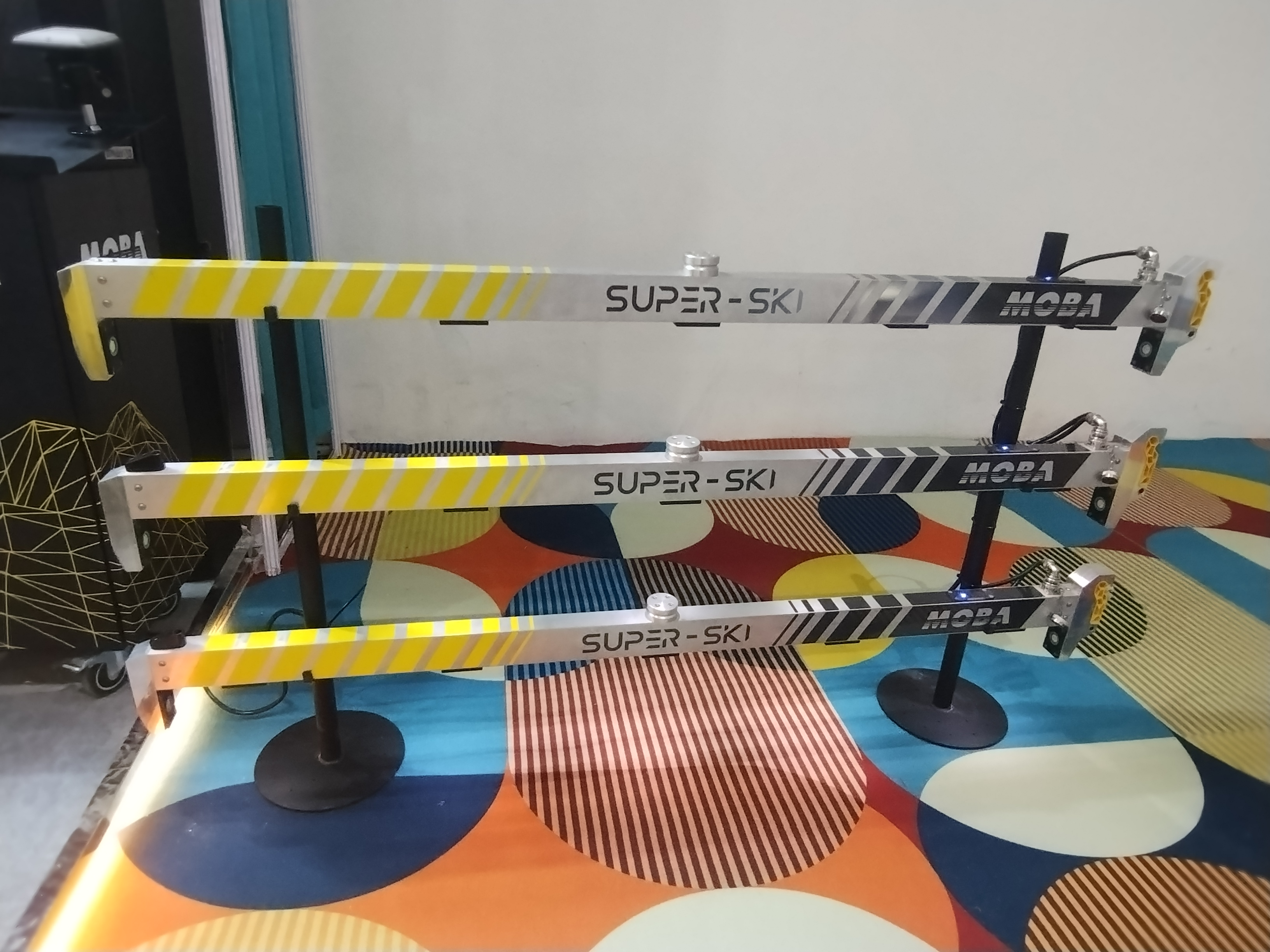
