= Merlin (bicycle company) =

Former American bicycle manufacturer

Merlin Metalworks Inc.
- Founded: 1986; 40 years ago Cambridge, Massachusetts, USA
- Founder: Gwyn Jones; Gary Helfrich; Mike Augspurger
- Fate: Acquired by Saucony (1998); Acquired by American Bicycle Group (2000); Brand rights acquired by Competitive Cyclist (2011)

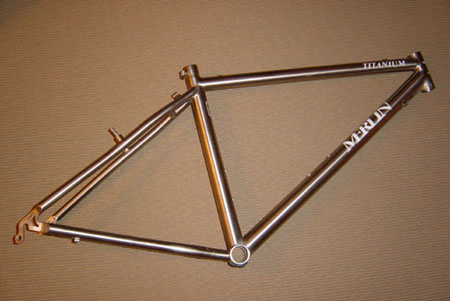
Merlin titanium MTB frame

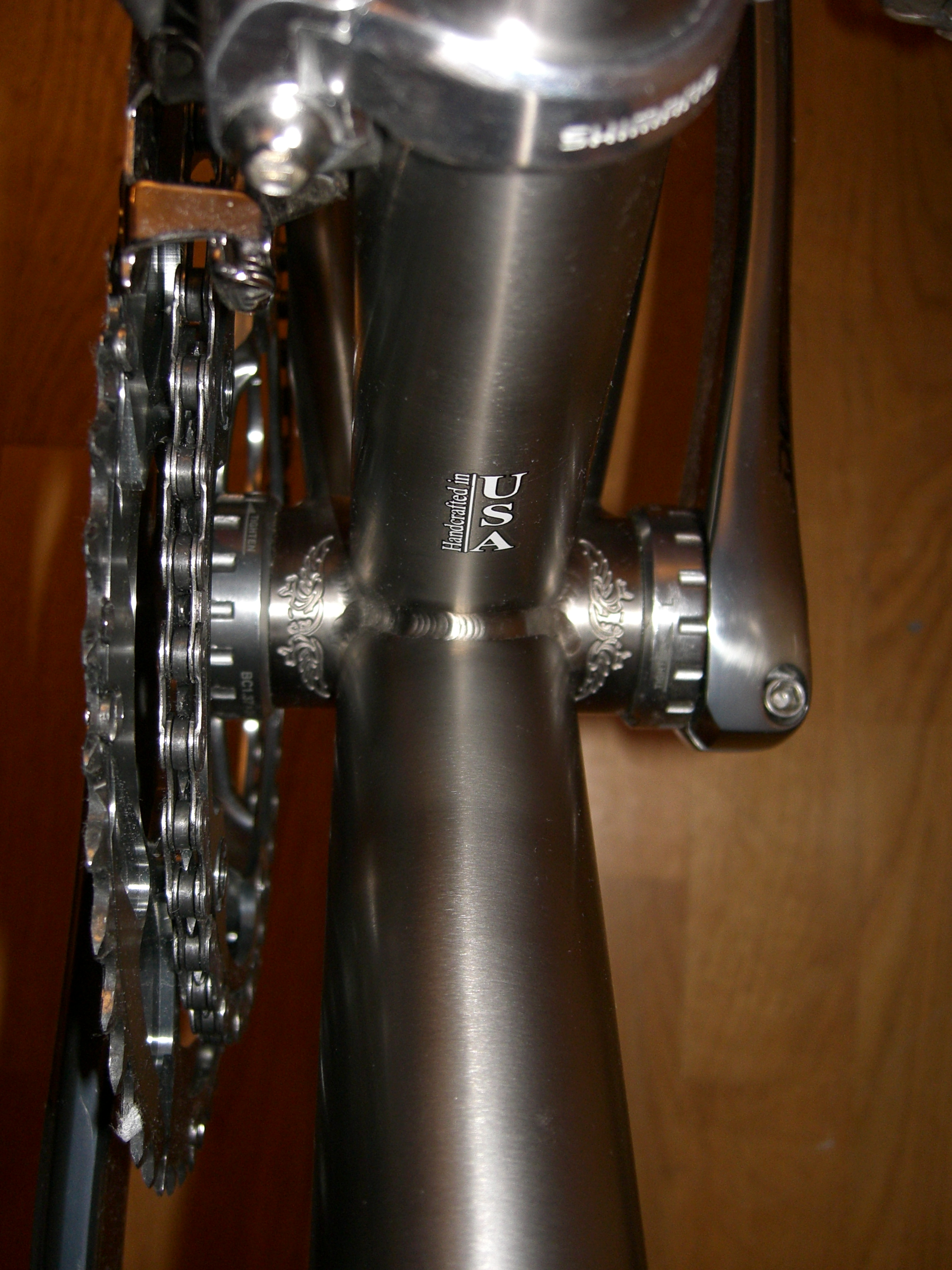
Extralight crank area with engraved bottom bracket shell.

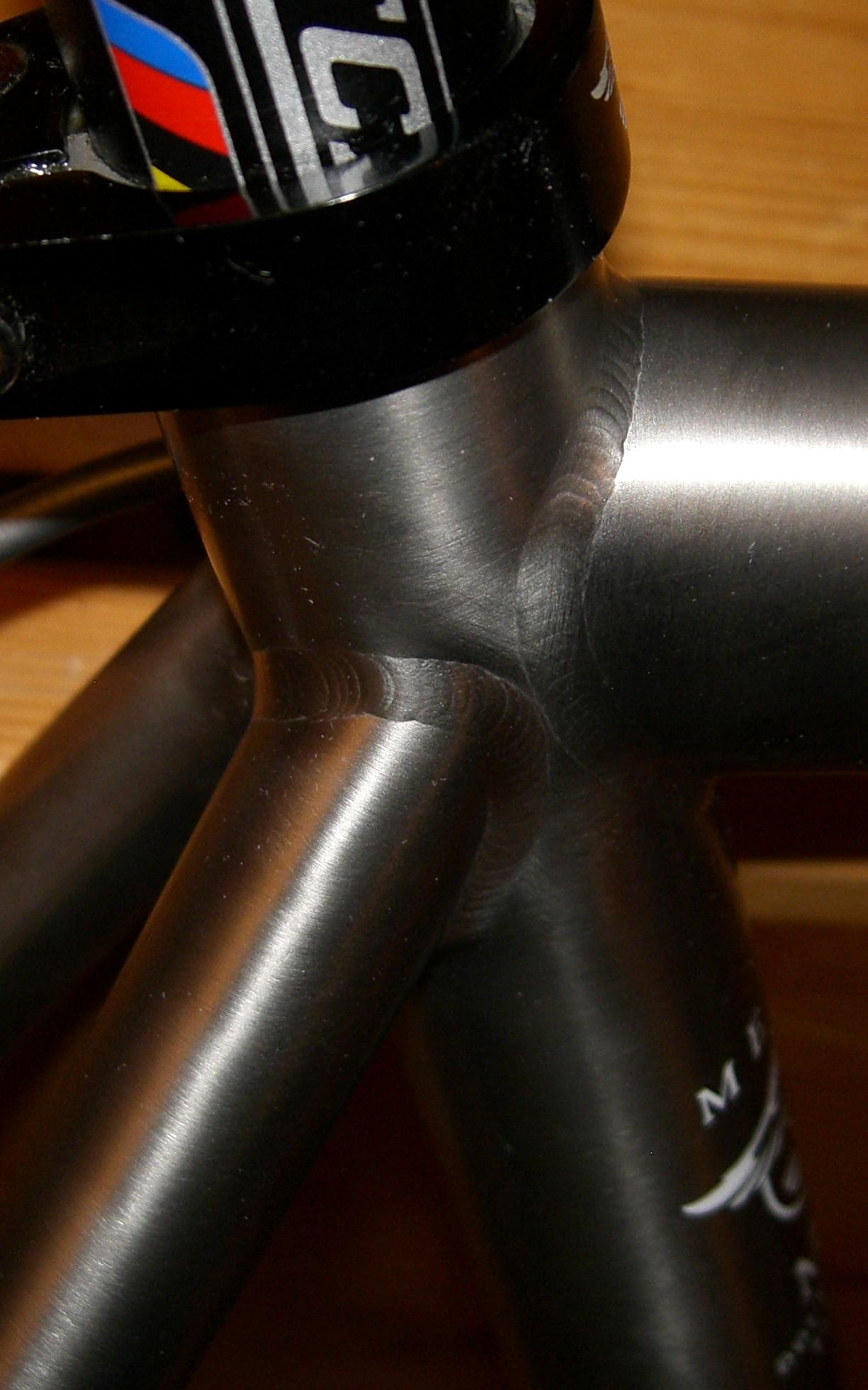
Weld beads.

Merlin Metalworks, Inc. was a US company that pioneered in titanium bicycle design and construction. Merlin introduced the first titanium alloy mountain bike, oversized tubesets, s-bend chain and seat stays for mountain bikes. For road bikes, Merlin commercialized the first titanium butted tubing and many other innovations.

== History ==
Merlin Metalworks was founded in 1986 by Gwyn Jones, Gary Helfrich, and Mike Augspurger in Cambridge, Massachusetts. They were one of the first to manufacture bicycle frames constructed solely from titanium. Flema in Germany, Speedwell in the UK and America's Teledyne were early users of titanium.

The first Merlin frame was a mountain bike frame custom-built for the defending National Mountain Bike Champion Joe Murray. In the following year, the company began a strong relationship with frame designer Tom Kellogg, who helped them produce the world's first 3-2.5 titanium alloy road bicycle frame. In 1988, Mike Augspurger left Merlin to found One-Off Titanium in Florence, Massachusetts, a company specializing in experimental and custom-designed products for bicycles. In 1989, Ashley Korenblat was hired as CEO.

Merlin became known for their accurate puddle welds as titanium remains harder to mill and weld.

In 1990, the Subaru-Montgomery team, consisting of Lance Armstrong, Steve Hegg, and Ken Carpenter, began its successful three-year relationship with Merlin.

In 1991, a year after winning his third Tour de France, Greg LeMond's Z Team came back to the race on prototypes of the Merlin Extralight. The first titanium bike to fully achieve the metal's promise, it was as strong as steel but lighter.

After the company became acquainted with Bob Hall, the first person to enter the Boston Marathon in a wheelchair, they began making titanium-racing chairs for him.

In 1994, Merlin introduced the first titanium cruiser called the Newsboy, which received positive reviews. The bike was re-introduced in 2002 with front-suspension and disc-brakes.

In 1995, Rob Kish won his third Race Across America on a Merlin Extralight.

== Acquisition ==
=== 1998 ===
Saucony acquired Merlin in 1998. In January, 1997 many employees, led by one of Merlin's first employees, Rob Vandermark, left Merlin to form Seven Cycles. Gwyn Jones was the only original founding member that remained with the company. As a result of Saucony's ownership, sales of Merlin frame declined, as stocks were left piling high.

=== 2000 ===
Merlin Metalworks was purchased by the American Bicycle Group in 2000 who relocated the company to Chattanooga, TN. Until 2011 American Bicycle Group owned three bicycle manufacturers: Merlin, Litespeed, Quintana Roo and the bicycle component maker Real Designs.

=== 2011 ===
On March 16, 2011, American Bicycle Group announced that bicycle retailer Competitive Cyclist of Little Rock, AR had acquired the rights to the Merlin Metalworks brand.

At the spring 2013 National American Handmade Bike (NAHB) show, Competitive Cyclist announced the return of Extralight Merlin road bike production with new geometry and additional models projected for later in the year. The Merlin frame was made by Form Cycles of Arizona.

=== 2018 ===
In the spring of 2018, John Siegrist, announced Janus Cycle Group, had purchased the rights to the Merlin name from Competitive Cyclist and Backcountry.com, and unveiled a new line of Merlin titanium bikes built in Boulder, Colorado at the Sea Otter Classic expo. Janus also owns DEAN Titanium. Started in 1989, Dean only works with titanium bicycle frames.

=== 2021 ===
In the summer of 2021, Boulder, Colorado-based Janus announced that it had sold Merlin Metalworks, Dean Titanium, Knight Composites, Ionic Bikes and Rossin Bikes combined assets to Phil Joseph, a former executive officer of Prologis and Spirit Realty. Mr. Joseph stated that the combined headquarters will stay in Boulder, Colorado
