= Triathlon equipment =

Equipment and clothing developed specifically for triathlons

Due to the nature of triathlons as a race consisting of multiple sports many pieces of technical equipment have been borrowed from other sports, or developed specifically in an effort to race faster and improve a competitors safety.

== Trisuits ==
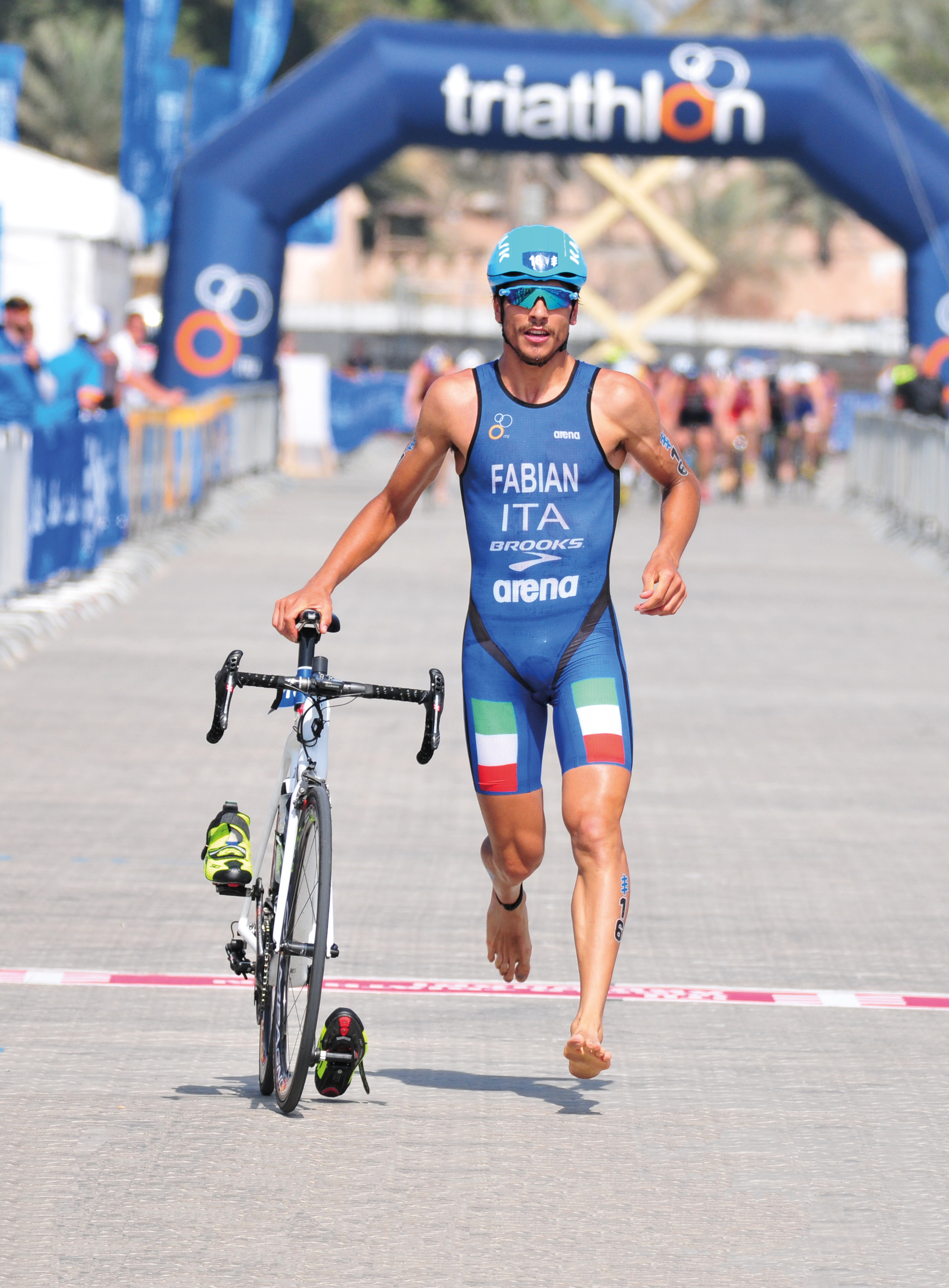
Fabian Alessandro in the national trisuit for Italy

A trisuit is a single skin tight item of clothing designed specifically for triathlon athletes to provide comfort and remove the necessity to change clothing while switching from swimming to cycling to running. Normally a trisuit is a single item of clothing; however, two-piece versions exist with separate shorts and top. These are mainly chosen for longer races where comfort is more important. All trisuits have a cycling chamois built in for comfort on the bike leg of the competition. However, these are thinner than traditional shorts for cycling to allow the wearer to run without additional friction. Traditionally, trisuits have no sleeves to allow for greater shoulder mobility for swimming, but trisuits with tight-fitting sleeves have become more popular recently. The material of a trisuit is important, as athletes will go from swimming to cycling, the clothing needs to be quick-drying so as to be comfortable for the majority of the cycling. The material also needs to be wicking or breathable, as cycling and running are sweat-producing activities and the trisuit is tight-fitting.

== Watch & Heart rate ==
In modern competition, triathletes often wear a watch to monitor time. This watch may be a smartwatch, tracking other metrics like distance, pace, and speed. A triathlete may also utilize a heart rate monitor, either on the wrist or across the chest, to help maintain a sustainable pace with maximum energy efficiency without "bonking" or "hitting the wall" (becoming too fatigued to continue).

== Swimming equipment ==
Typical equipment for the swim segment include a swim cap, goggles and possibly a wetsuit.

=== Cap and Goggles ===
Swim caps are normally provided by the event with the colours to organise and categorise swimmers by event or by heat. Swim goggles are used to protect the eyes of the swimmer from the water and to allow greater vision when swimming. In some triathlons the swim portion is held in a swimming pool if this is the case no wetsuit is used and no special care is required for the goggles or swim cap. Usually though triathlon swims are done in open water (lakes, rivers, or oceans), therefore extra considerations must be made about equipment.

Due to the reduced visibility of participants in open water bright coloured swimming caps are almost exclusively used to allow swimmers to be seen for both safety and spectators. Swim goggles for open water swimming will often have either coloured or mirrored lenses, because without this light reflecting of the waters surface will dazzle or blind swimmers not allowing them to see where they are swimming.

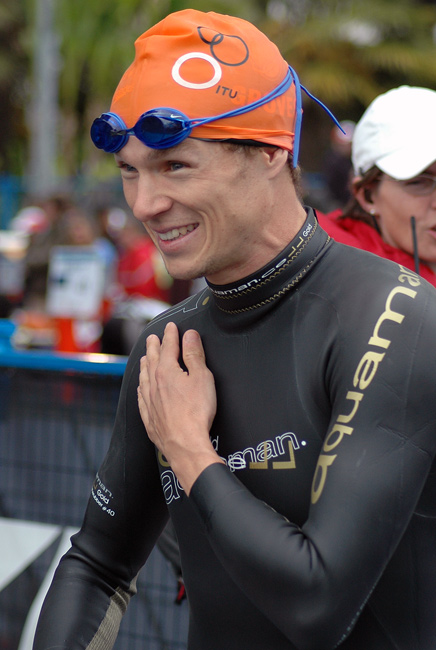
Gold medallist Simon Whitfield preparing for the swim.

=== Wetsuits ===
Because most triathlon swim stages that are conducted in open waters are cold, many entrants wear wetsuits. However, typical wetsuits manufactured for snorkeling or surfing are not optimised for swimming, because the tightness at the shoulders generally restrict the range of motion too much for comfortable stroking during the swim. Modern triathlon wetsuits were invented by Dan Empfield in 1987 and are customised to the needs of triathletes, and generally incorporate the following features:

- Thinner and/or more pliable rubber near the shoulders, sleeveless versions are also available.
- Long zippers and sometimes wrist/ankle zippers to facilitate quick removal during transition.

In addition, triathlon wetsuits have a very smooth, but often fragile, surface. This slick surface helps to reduce water friction and allow a faster swim, but it would be easily destroyed by contact with a sandy surfboard. Another advantage of a wetsuit is the added buoyancy around the hips and legs which can provide competitors with a considerable advantage.

Specific rules vary by event, but typically the legality of racing in a wetsuit depends on the water temperature on the day of the event. Wetsuits are disallowed if the water temperature is above a specified threshold and become mandatory if the water temperature is below and optional between the two, for example the British Triathlon rules state that wetsuits are forbidden above 22 °C and mandatory below 14 °C. If not racing in a wetsuit an athlete has the option of wearing any other style of swimsuit allowed by the rules. Under the current ITU rule set, there exists a wetsuit thickness rule. No wetsuit with a thickness of greater than 5mm may be used. Most triathlon wetsuits have thicknesses of 3mm to 5mm.

=== Disallowed aids ===
Any artificial propulsion device, such as fins, paddles or swim socks as well as any flotation device except a wetsuit, is prohibited. Headphones or any in ear device such as a tempo timer. Snorkels used to be a grey area with many national federations including that of Canada, Australia and the USA as well as the sports governing body the ITU not specifically disallowing snorkels. However after a change to the ITUs official rule set specifically banning snorkels most national federation have also disallowed. In the U.S., snorkels are forbidden for races held by the ITU and the WTC (Ironman races) but not by USAT. Tom Reilly, a USAT-certified official, closed the debate around the grey rules of USAT by stating officially that snorkels are allowed since not on the forbidden list of items.

=== Ergometers ===
Some triathletes do not have the luxury of an open water swim environment near where they train, and year-round outside training can be difficult in cold climates. Several swim training products have been created to address this issue including ergometers like the Vasa Swim Trainer or compact swimming treadmills like Endless Pools.

== Cycling equipment ==
=== Triathlon bicycles ===
Triathlon bicycles are a variant of road-racing bicycles, designed primarily to optimise aerodynamics. Since in most triathlons, cyclists do not draft as in many other forms of road racing, triathletes can gain a significant advantage by riding a bicycle which reduces wind resistance. The most obvious features of a triathlon bicycle are the handlebars, commonly known as "aero-bars" (see below).

In addition, many components of a triathlon bicycle are designed with an aerodynamic profile: frame tubes have an oval or teardrop (instead of circular) cross-section; handlebars may be flat instead of round; wheels may have fewer spokes, or even be carbon fiber tri-spokes or discs rather than conventional spoked wheels. Lastly, a number of "radical" bicycle frames that are illegal in road cycling are still legal in triathlon, so "nontraditional" frame designs are also common, including Zipp 2001, Softride, and Kestrel.

Tri bikes generally have a very "aggressive" geometry, meaning steep (close to vertical) tube angles and a low stem and handlebars relative to the saddle. This position helps to improve aerodynamics by lowering the cyclist's torso and creating a smaller overall "drag profile". In addition, many triathletes feel cycling in this position helps preserve the muscles used in running by emphasising pedalling with non-running muscle groups.

The concept of a tri specific bicycle was pioneered by Ralph Ray and Dan Empfield in the late 1980s. Tri bikes are generally very similar to time trial bicycles used in time trial races. In 1989, Empfield designed the Quintana Roo Superform, a triathlon specific bicycle "built from the aerobars back" which provided an aerodynamic advantage as well as more power when in the "aero" position. Empfield's bike had 650c wheels and an 80 degree seat angle which was unique to the period. Many professional triathletes were sceptical of the "steep" design at first but when Ray Browning rode it at Ironman New Zealand breaking the bike and overall course records and left the bike leg with a 30-minute lead over rival Scott Tinley, the concepts were here to stay.

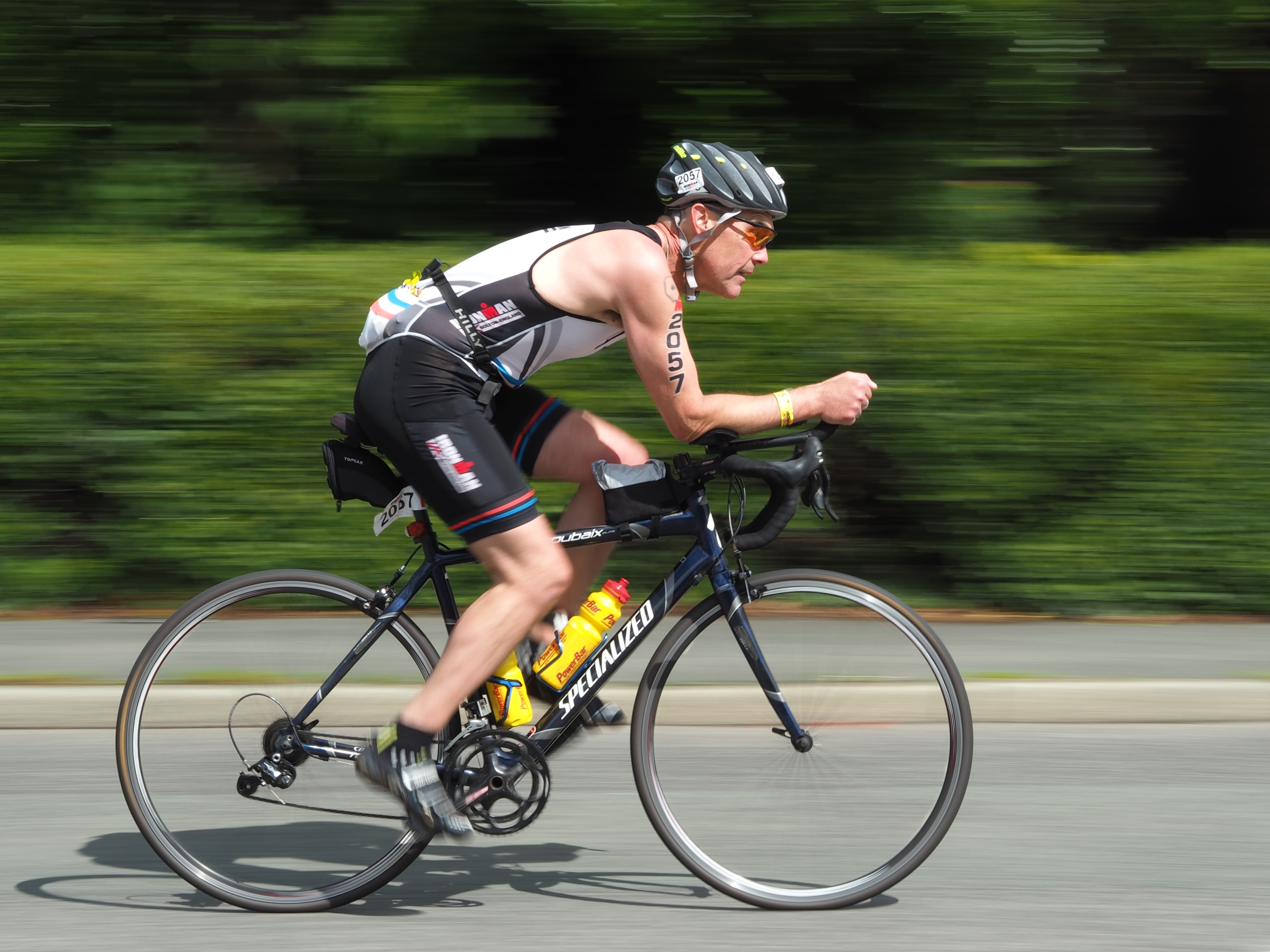
An athlete riding on aerobars

The aerodynamic shape causes somewhat higher weight, even if carbon fiber is used, because the aero shape is larger and takes more materials. In a slow uphill race, a low-weight traditional road bicycle might be preferred as weight is more critical than aero when biking slowly.

=== Aerobars ===
Aerobars, also commonly referred to as "tri-bars," are handlebars designed to reduce the cyclist's wind profile. Triathlon played a key role in the development of cycling with an aero geometry during the 1980s. Aerobars are used in other forms of cycling, such as time trials and some events in track cycling.

Instead of the familiar curved "drop bars" of road bicycles, aerobars are mounted to a set of "pace bars" or "bull-horns". A pair of bars stretches straight forward from the centre of these handlebars at the stem of the fork. Padded cups or pads in the middle of the bars support the athlete's elbows and/or forearms while the hands are stretched forward to hold the centre bars. This position keeps the rider's elbows in close to the body and lowers his or her torso compared to the usual upright position.

The brake levers are mounted on the side horns; the rider will hold these instead of the centre bars when braking or manoeuvring is required. Often the shifters for the derailleur gears are mounted at the tips of the aero bars allowing the athlete to change gear ratios without compromising their aerodynamic position.

Riding with aerobars is facilitated by adopting a steep seat-tube angle, often referred to as an "aggressive" geometry. The forward nature of this positioning is not as easy to control as traditional seat tube angle and upright position. Manoeuvrability is compromised for an aerodynamic body position when a bike is fitted with low aerobars.

The International Triathlon Union regulates the size of aerobars used in competition for draft-legal races. Triathlons allowing drafting promote cycling as a group on the cycle leg of the triathlon, allowing athletes to compete with a very aggressive geometry compromises safety as vulnerability is reduced. Professional triathletes competing in these races use "shorty" aerobars mounted on traditional drop handlebars.

=== Triathlon shoes ===
Triathlon shoes are similar to other forms of cycling shoe used in racing, with automatic binding cleats (clipless) that snap the cyclist's feet to the pedals. Tri shoes are often optimised for this approach: they may be padded to allow comfortable use without socks, have holes to allow water from the swim to drain easily, and have only one or two velcro straps for ease of fastening rather than the three straps, laces, or ratcheting buckles found on modern road racing shoes. It is not uncommon for the Velcro straps used to close from the outside of the foot inwards, this non-traditional configuration keeps the opened straps away from the chain and bicycles, preventing the possibility of entangling them if pedaling with unstrapped shoes early or late in the race.

Many competitive triathletes choose to leave their shoes clipped onto the pedals for the entire duration of the race in order to save time during transitions. This means the athlete is jumping onto the bicycle with wet, bare feet after the swim, and will pedal up to a reasonable speed, with his or her feet sitting on top of the shoes, before pausing to slip the feet inside the shoes and fasten them. Likewise, the athlete will pull his or her feet out of the shoes while coasting up to the bike-run transition area and run barefoot into the transition corral rather than attempt to run on the awkward cycling cleats.

=== Hydration systems ===
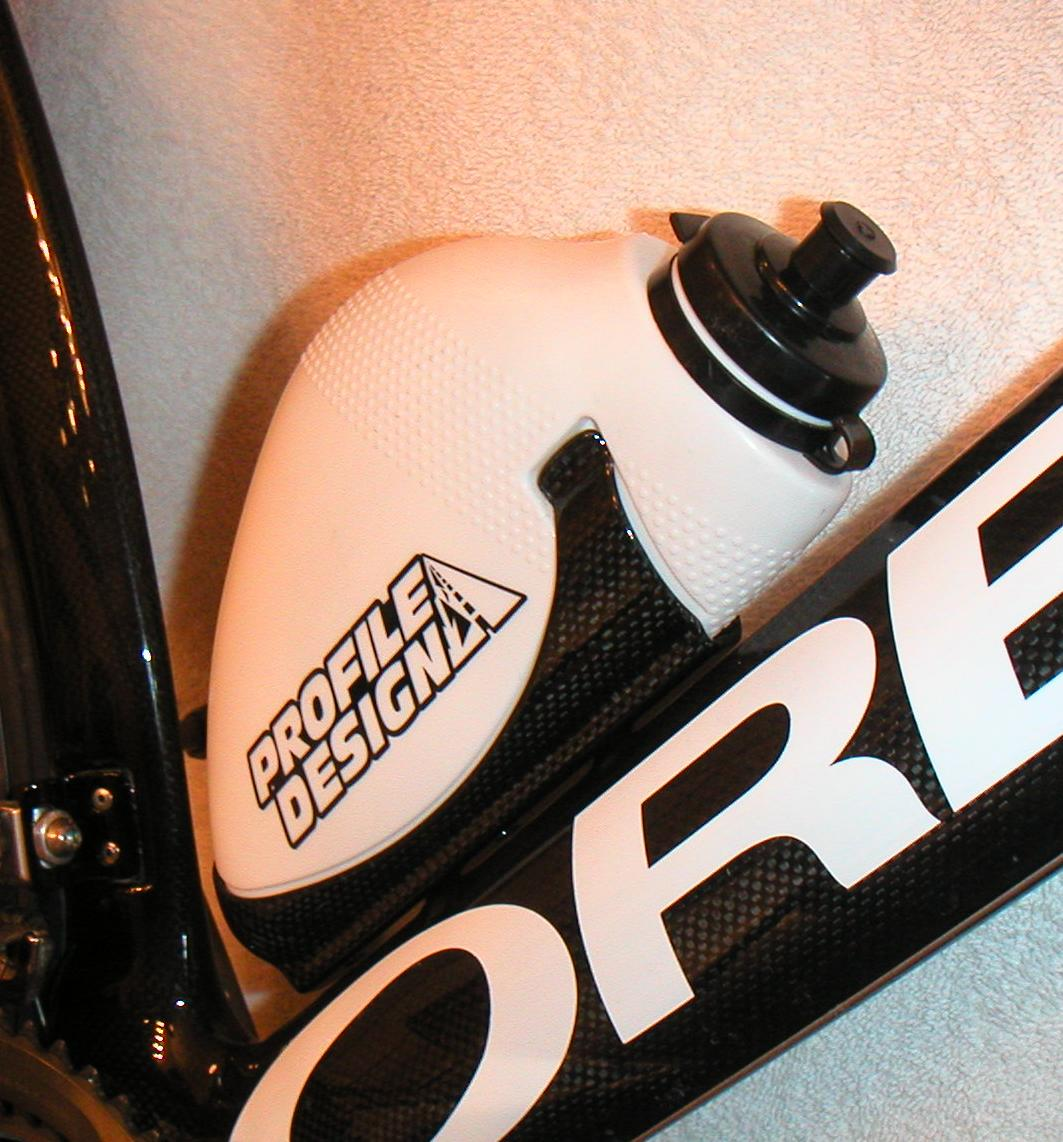
Aerodynamically shaped bottle with matching carbon fiber cage

As with everything else, triathletes often strive to make their water bottles as aerodynamic as possible, and often to reduce the need to reach for a water bottle - which may interrupt pedaling and slow the racer down. Triathletes have tried placing water bottles in unusual locations, such as in a bracket behind the saddle, on the theory that the bottles are shielded from the wind by the body. However, a recent wind-tunnel study by Triathlete Magazine discovered that this approach is actually counterproductive because it interrupts the laminar flow of air down the athlete's curved back. A 2003, wind tunnel study by Dan Empfield found that the best configuration was a single water bottle on the bike's downtube (it smoothed airflow to the seat tube and rear wheel). This caused less drag than having no waterbottle at all. The most drag was 2 water bottles; one on the down tube and one on the seat tube.

A number of products have been created to satisfy triathlete's demands for aerodynamic hydration systems. Examples include the Aerodrink system by Profile Design, an aero bottle that hangs from the handlebars with a straw so the athlete can drink without using his hands; and the Neverreach system, a teardrop-shaped reservoir mounted behind the seat with a tube running up to the handlebars. In addition, certain high-end triathlon bicycles have a hydration system integrated into the frame's tubing itself.

On long-distance triathlons, the participants will get filled bottles by the organiser during the race as replacement for the used ones. If using special bottles, the received bottle should be emptied into own bottle, and immediately thrown. Bottles hanging from the handlebars are generally prepared for this. To throw bottles outside aid stations is not allowed. In Ironman own aid suppliers are not allowed.

=== Wheels ===
A vast array of low-weight and/or aerodynamic wheels exist for racing bicycles. Some (such as wheels with an aerodynamic ring, flat spokes, and fewer spokes than the traditional 32) are legal for use in most cycling events, while others such as carbon-fiber tri-spokes (wheels with only three large, rigid spokes) generally are only legal in triathlons and time-trials. Typically wheels that are lighter are preferred and, although this is an obvious consideration, it is not the only one. Higher profile wheels (larger rim) are conducive to laminar flow of air past them more so than traditional thin rimmed wheels.

Solid disc wheels are used as well, though in outdoor settings these are generally not used on the front wheel because they are difficult to handle in crosswinds. Disc wheels provide a significant aerodynamic advantage when mounted on the rear wheel improving laminar flow over the rear half of the bike. Recent developments in technology have given rise to disc wheels with a dimpled surface like a golf ball, also in the name of aerodynamics. Disc wheels are not permitted at the Ironman World Championships in Kona Hawaii, as large crosswinds are not uncommon and present an unsafe situation to athletes.

Some triathlon bikes use 650c wheels (a nominal diameter of 65 centimeters) rather than the conventional 700c wheels used on nearly all road bikes. The smaller wheels weigh less, have a smaller cross-sectional area (reducing wind resistance), and reduce the overall wind resistance of the bicycle by bringing the frame and cyclist closer to the ground. A potential drawback is that the smaller diameter means a higher curvature at the tire's contact patch, which increases rolling resistance. Which effect is more prominent depends on the cyclist and the windiness and steepness of the course.

=== Other components ===
Many triathletes can be quite fixated with improving the aerodynamics and lowering the weight of their bicycles. As a result, the triathlon industry has developed a whole host of components which improve myriad characteristics of the bicycle. Examples include chainrings which have no holes or gaps (increasing aerodynamics a minuscule amount at the cost of a few grams of weight), brake and shifter cables which run inside the bicycle frame, and components of all sorts made from carbon fiber composite rather than steel or aluminum, in order to save weight.

== Running equipment ==
=== Shoes ===
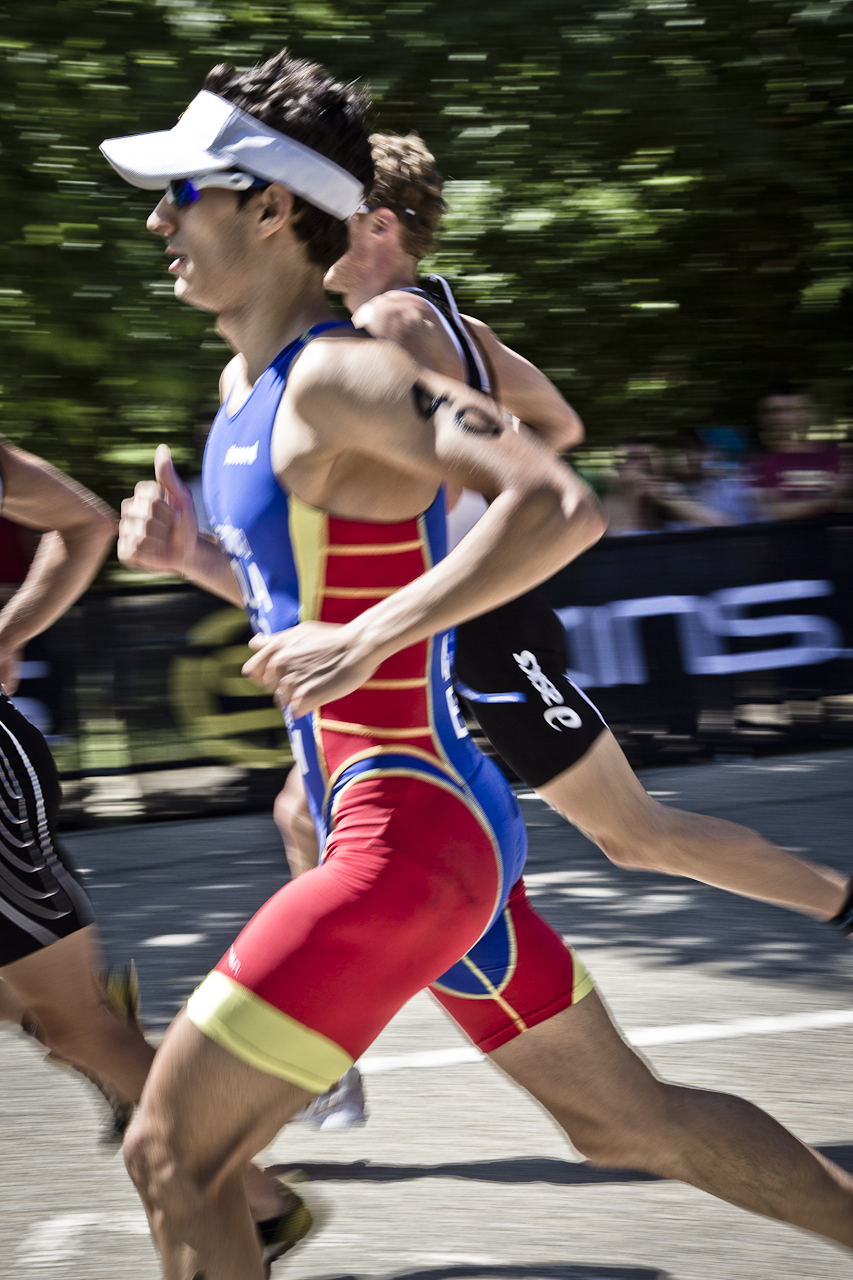
Mario Mola is notorious for racing with a visor during the run.

Normal running shoes are used by most athletes, but triathlon-specific shoes do also exist. One difference between runner's shoes and triathlete's shoes is that the triathlete's shoes may have a hole cut in to the heel to allow water to drain out, keeping the shoes from becoming saturated and heavy. This is especially important on longer run courses, where a minor annoyance can become painful. This is also more common in an aquathlon event where athletes go from swimming straight to running, carrying much more water into the shoe.

=== Elastic Shoelaces ===
Triathletes often replace their shoelaces with laces made of elastic, which allows a triathlete when racing them to pull on the shoes without stopping to tie the laces. This saves a time during the bike to run transition, in fact most athletes find that their finger dexterity is reduced due to tiredness meaning lacing shoes takes longer than expected. The laces work by being threaded tight like normal laces but then a clamping mechanism holds a pre-set the tension of the laces providing support to the wearer but the flex in the elastic allows enough give to slide the shoes on and off. The most well known brand of such laces that are designed specifically for triathlon are Lock Laces.

=== No Socks ===
Socks are often forgone on short course races, as they cannot be worn during the swim and the time required to put them on is seen as time that cannot be recovered. If socks are worn, they are normally trainer socks which are faster to put on. Not using socks can cause abrasion which might be painful. Triathletes often practice running the intended distance in the racing shoes without socks. On the long course races most athletes will wear socks, especially for the run, as the comfort provided is seen to outweigh the time lost. Also on long course events some athletes use long compression socks with the expectation that the socks will enhance endurance .

== Triathlon-specific transition equipment ==
Triathlon, even more so than other multi-sport races, is distinctive because athletes must transition between the three disciplines (swimming, cycling, and running) while the clock is still running on the race. As a result, triathletes have come to rely on particular equipment (in addition to some of the equipment above) to either speed up the transition process, or make it a more comfortable one.

=== Race number belts ===
A race number belt is a simple, elastic belt with a plastic slide-in buckle. As its name suggests, athletes often attach race numbers to this belt, so they can quickly clip it on during the transition before the run. This method allows athletes to not wear the race number (also referred to as a "bib") until the last leg of the race, when it is needed for official purposes (Note: some races also require wearing the bib during the bike portion, in that case on the back. Please refer to specific race rules for your race). It also makes attachment fast and easy, and avoids the need to pin the bib though one's clothing. During races which require race numbers during the bike leg, wearing a race number belt makes it easy to display the race number properly: athletes slide the belt to show their bib number on their backs whilst cycling, and then slide the belt to display the number on the front during the run.

=== Rubber bands ===
Especially in professional races, rubber bands are used to speed up the transition process by using them to suspend cycling shoes upright on a bike, while the shoes are already clipped in to the pedals. The athlete will then run with the bike out of the transition area, hop on the bike with the shoes already on it, and immediately start pedaling. The rubber bands will break on the first pedal stroke, and the athlete will then begin pedaling, riding with his or her feet on top of the shoes until the terrain is calm enough to put his or her feet into the shoes while still riding the bike. This low-tech method can save tens of seconds in the race.

=== Talcum Powder ===
Talcum powder is placed in both sets of shoes to in an extra attempt to absorb any excess moisture and keep the foot dry

== See also ==
- Outline of cycling
