= SAIL Outdoors =

Canadian outdoor equipment retailer

- Industry: Outdoor equipment retailer
- Founded: 1981
- Number of locations: 12
- Key people: Norman Décarie (President and CEO)
- Number of employees: 1100 (2021)
- Subsidiaries: SAIL; Sportium
- Website: www.sail.ca

SAIL Outdoors Inc. is a Canadian outdoor equipment retailer with stores in Quebec and Ontario.

== Summary ==
SAIL Outdoors Inc. is a Canadian retailing company specializing in outdoor equipment and sport equipment. The company is more than 40 years old and had about 1,100 employees as of June 2021. With head office in Quebec. The Quebec-based retailer operates two chains:

- SAIL with 12 standalone stores focused more on outdoor equipment including outdoor camping, fishing and hunting. Eight locations in Quebec and four in Ontario.
