= Trailside =

- Also known as: Trailside: Make Your Own Adventure
- Starring: John Viehman; Peter Whittaker; Robyn Benincasa; Arlene Burns; Ray Browning; Annie Nelson; Julie Dauphine; Brian Hyder
- Country of origin: United States
- No. of episodes: 154

Production
- Running time: 30 Minutes
- Production companies: New Media, Inc. TLN Productions

Original release
- Release: 1993 – 2003

Trailside: Make Your Own Adventure was the longest-running outdoor "how-to" adventure public television series. It aired in the USA on non-commercial public television stations, distributed first by American Public Television, Boston, and later by National Educational Telecommunications Association, Columbia, South Carolina.

== Overview ==
Trailside: Make Your Own Adventure was a six-time Emmy-nominated series that brought the outdoors to millions of viewers each week. The series premiered in 1993 and, at its peak, was available to over 80 million households via Public Television as well as the Outdoor Life Network. Internationally, Trailside was seen on NHK in Japan, TSN in Canada and NBC's Super Channel in 32 European countries.

Episodes were originally produced by New Media, Inc., based in Westport, Connecticut (Seasons 1–3). In seasons 1 and 2, the series was partnered with Rodale Publications' Backpacker Magazine and hosted by John Viehman, Backpacker's editor. Eventually, Rodale wanted a greater ownership in the series, and failing that split off to create their own Anyplace Wild program.

Mountaineer Peter Whittaker took over hosting duties, as the series continued to team him up with guest experts providing the audience information with tips and advice on popular outdoor activities. Going into the fourth season, New Media was taken over by TLN Productions based out of West Palm Beach, Florida. Under TLN's executive producer Steven Vocino's direction, the series found new sponsorship opportunities around the world.

The series was underwritten by Chevy Trucks, L.L. Bean and Hi-Tec apparel in Seasons 1 and 2. Other sponsors over the following two years included Chevy Trucks, Weider Nutrition and Michelin Tires. Additional sponsors included local, regional, State and international tourism agencies.
