= Litespeed =

American bicycle manufacturer

Litespeed Bicycles
- Type: Subsidiary
- Industry: Bicycles
- Founded: 1986; 40 years ago
- Headquarters: Chattanooga, Tennessee, United States
- Key people: Christopher Pascarella (President & CEO)
- Products: Bicycles
- Parent: American Bicycle Group
- Website: www.litespeed.com

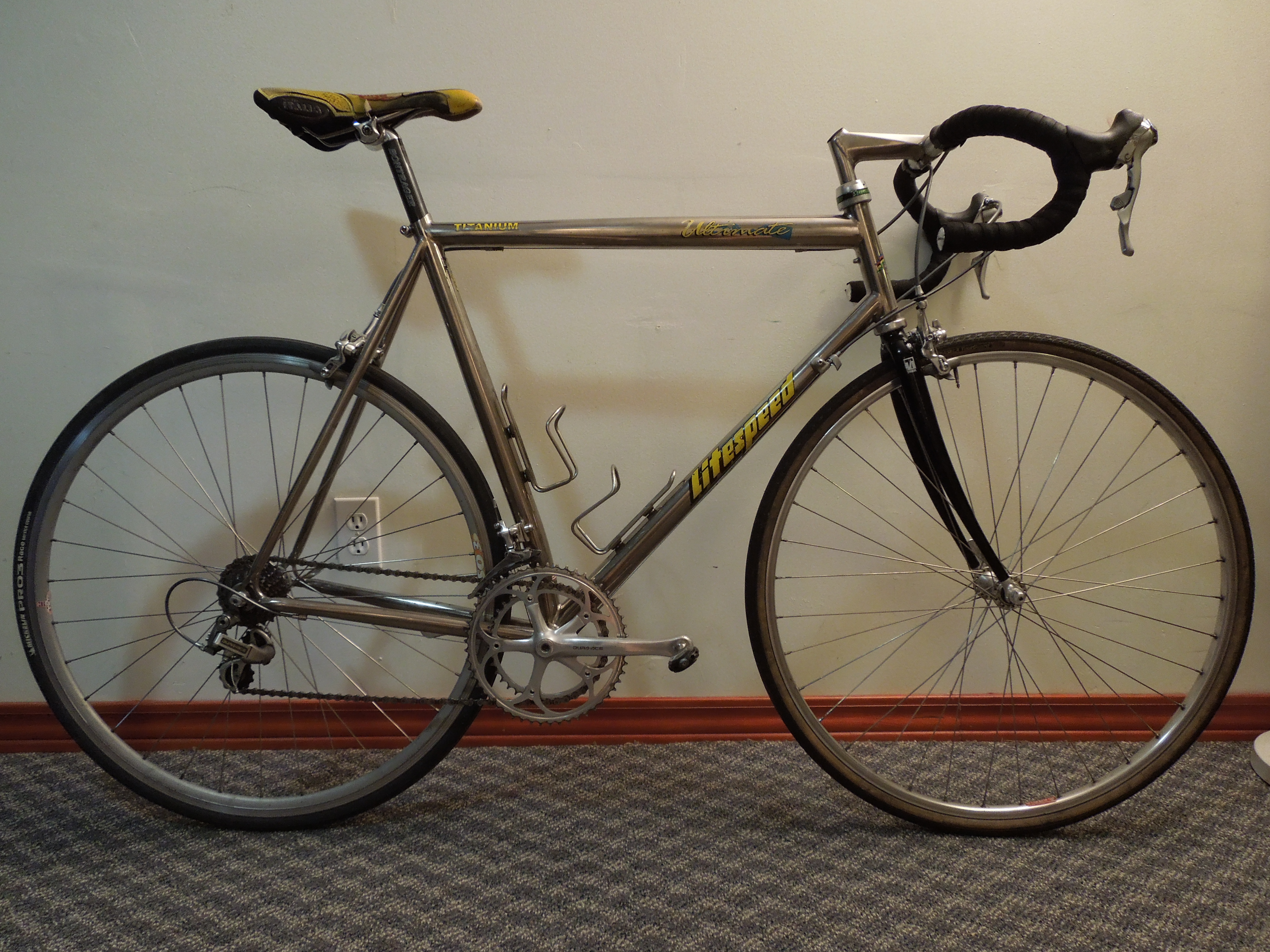
1994 Litespeed Ultimate with 8-speed Shimano Dura-Ace groupo, early Trek carbon fork, Bontrager carbon seatpost, Cinelli Criterium handlebars and Grammo stem, and Speedplay pedals

Litespeed is an American bicycle manufacturer based in Chattanooga, Tennessee. Litespeed makes titanium road racing bicycles, gravel bicycles and mountain bikes. Titanium bicycle frames are famed for their ride quality. Litespeed, along with OBED Bikes and triathlon specific bicycle brand Quintana Roo, are subsidiaries of the American Bicycle Group.

== History ==
Litespeed bicycles were first brought to market by David Lynskey at the Long Beach bike show in 1987. American Bicycle Group purchased the brand in 1999.

Litespeed bicycles have been tested and ridden by many in the competitive cycling and triathlon world: Tour de France cyclists Greg LeMond, Robbie McEwen, and Lance Armstrong; wheel innovator Steve Hed; IRONMAN competitors Tim DeBoom and Cameron Brown; Olympians Simon Whitefield, Jeff Kabush, the ITU Triathlon World Cup champion Vanessa Fernandes (Portugal), and 59-time French champion and 13-time world champion Jeannie Longo.

In the 1999 Tour de France, Lance Armstrong rode a titanium Litespeed Blade painted and labeled as a Trek during time trials. Several professionals have ridden Litespeeds painted as other brands. European brands such as Eddy Merckx and Bianchi have contracted Litespeed to construct titanium frames in their own lines.

Litespeed purchased Merlin (bicycles) and Quintana Roo in 2000 from Saucony, and trademark of Tomac in 2001. In March 2011, American Bicycle Group announced that bicycle retailer Competitive Cyclist of Little Rock, Arkansas had acquired the rights to the Merlin Metalworks brand.

Litespeed has also sponsored the professional cycling teams Lotto–Adecco, DFL–Cyclingnews–Litespeed, Calyon/Litespeed Pro Cycling, and Team Maxxis. In 2014, Litespeed announced that they would sponsor the Astellas Pro Cycling Team for three seasons.

Litespeed has been a contractor and consultant to NASA for projects that require titanium-intensive sub-assemblies including the landing gear on the Mars Curiosity Rover.

Litespeed was honored at a "Made in America Showcase" event at the White House in 2019. Litespeed frames are made in the USA of globally sourced materials.

== Models ==
=== Road ===
T-Series: The titanium T-Series includes award-winning T1 (formerly the Archon), the T3, T5, and the T7 which was introduced in 2013. The T1sl replaces the T1 in 2016. It is 15% lighter than the 2015 T1.

L-Series: The carbon L-Series was introduced in 2012. Litespeed has four L-Series bikes: L1R, L1 (SRAM Red), Li2, and L3 (Ultegra). The L-Series is an all-around road racing bike, with an asymmetrical frame, and UCI-approved.

C-Series: The carbon C-Series was introduced in 2008. Litespeed has four C-Series bikes: C1R, C1 (Dura-Ace), Ci2, and C3 (Ultegra). The C-Series is an aerodynamic road bike series.

M-Series: Litespeed has two M-Series bikes: M1 and M3. The M-Series are built to exceed the demands of training and racing, day in and day out, with design features that are unheard-of at this price point.

Non-Current Titanium Models: Classic, Ultimate, Catalyst, Vortex, Nachez, Tuscany, Liege, Palmares, Arenberg, Siena, Ghisallo, Veneto, Solano, Firenze, Teramo, Bella, Ardennes, Archon, Niota, Icon, Xicon, Tachyon, Blade, Appalachian.

Aluminum Models: Sirius, Avior, Mira, Vela, Palio, Hyperion, Capella. Aluminum frames first introduced in 2002, remained in production until approximately 2010. These models included titanium wrapped, carbon forks and seat stays.

Carbon Models: The Pavia carbon frame was introduced in 2005. Actually a rebadged PedalForce frame. Discontinued after 2006.

=== Mountain ===
Pinhoti SL: Named after the rugged trail system in Georgia, The Pinhoti SL is a titanium hardtail.

Citico: Named after the Citico Creek Wilderness in Southeastern Tennessee, the pro-grade, Archon-inspired Citico is the first MTB frame to use a T1 engineered 6Al/4V, 6-sided and flared top tube and an oversized bi-axially ovalized down tube to maximize steering feedback, accuracy, and front end stiffness. Compatible with both 26" and 650b wheels.

Pisgah: Geometry identical to the Citico, the Pisgah puts Litespeed performance into service for any cross-country, single-speed, or urban MTB build. Compatible with both 26" and 650b wheels.

Sewanee: A full-suspension cross country race bike, the latest Sewanee features 90 mm of rear travel in a cold-worked 3Al/2.5V titanium frame. Compatible with both 26" and 650b wheels.

Cohutta: Features the industry's first 29er-specific titanium tubeset.

=== Time Trial ===
Blade: The legendary Litespeed Blade has been reintroduced as a Limited Edition carbon frameset in Litespeed's 2016 model lineup. The Blade is a super-minimalist TT frameset, designed to excel on the hillier, windier, more challenging courses and no penalty on the flat, fast days. Astellas Pro Cycling competed with carbon Litespeed Blades in the 2015 UCI Road World Championship TTT (Team Time Trial). The original Blade models were crafted with titanium material and ridden by many great cyclists, such as Lance Armstrong.

=== Gravel ===
Gravel: A bike designed for the recent craze of riding on gravel roads. It has a road bike style frame and handlebars, disc brakes, and room for wide tires.

== Technology ==
=== Titanium ===
Litespeed uses 6/4 titanium, which is an alloy of titanium with 6 percent aluminum and 4 percent vanadium, instead of the more-common 3/2.5 titanium. It is more difficult to work with, but has a better strength to weight ratio than other available alloys. It was initially not available as tubes, so Litespeed bought thin plates and cold-rolled and welded their own tubes.

=== AeroLogic ===
A key feature of Litespeed's C-Series of aero road bikes, AeroLogic is the incorporation of aerodynamic elements into frame design without the penalty of excess weight. AeroLogic features on the C-Series include a shrouded water bottle mount on the down tube, aero-tuned tube cross sections, a "morphed" shaping of the seat stays, and a proprietary bladed and bowed aero fork.

=== Reactive Pressure Molding ===
Litespeed's Reactive Pressure Molding (RPM) is an advanced molding method utilized during manufacture of Litespeed's newest composite frames. The three primary benefits of RPM are weight reduction, increased stiffness, and improved durability. This advanced process allows designs elements far beyond what can be accomplished with conventional bladder molding. Unique features such as an all-carbon head tube, compatible with the most precise ZS style press fit headsets, as well the multitude of AeroLogic aerodynamic elements are incorporated without the need of solid, permanent components and unwanted filler materials. The result is higher performance with no weight penalty plus additional benefits of improved strength, impact resistance, and stiffness.
