= American Bicycle Group =

American bicycles manufacturer

- Founded: 2000
- Headquarters: Chattanooga, Tennessee, United States
- Key people: Christopher Pascarella (President)
- Products: Quintana Roo Triathlon; OBED Bikes; Litespeed Titanium Bicycles
- Website: americanbicyclegroup.com

American Bicycle Group (ABG) is a manufacturer of bicycles based in Chattanooga, Tennessee, United States. The company operates under a consumer-direct business model: selling their made-to-order bikes online and shipping them direct to the consumer.

In July 2019, ABG was honored at a White House "Made in America Product Showcase".

== Technology ==
Best known for its cold-worked titanium bikes, the company also built the titanium legs of the Mars Land Rover Curiosity for NASA’s Jet Propulsion Laboratory in 2009.

Since 2012, ABG has used 3D printing technology for rapid prototyping and product development.

== Brands ==
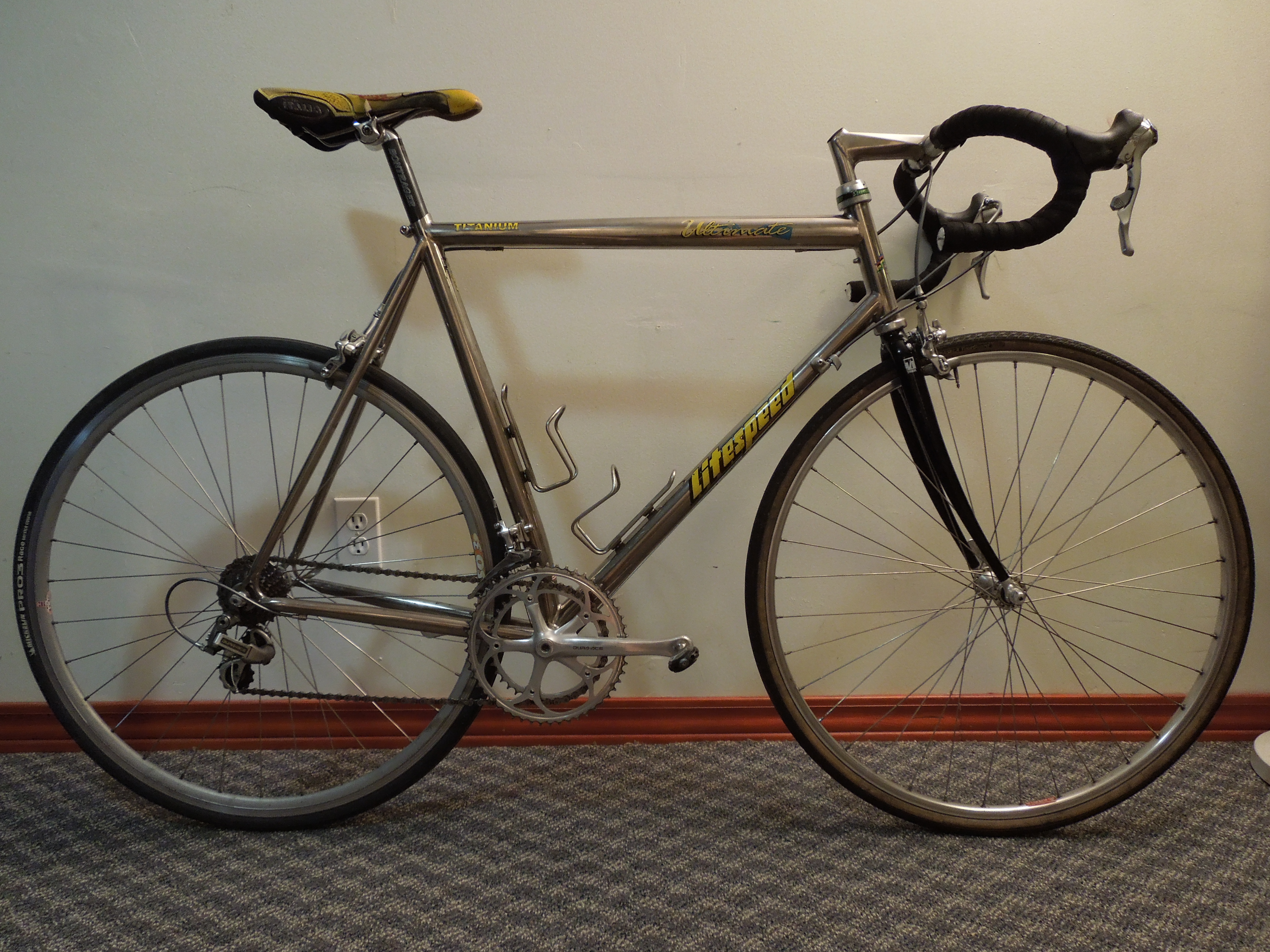
Litespeed Ultimate

ABG owns three brands:

1. Litespeed is the company's flagship line of titanium bikes.
  - Litespeed has received Bicycle Guide Magazine Best of Cycling Award (1988) and Eurobike Design Award.
2. Quintana Roo (QR) builds triathlon bikes, wetsuits, and skimsuits.
  - QR has received LAVA Magazine Gear-of-the-Year Award (2015) and (2016) and Interbike/TBI Innovation Award (2016).
3. Obed Bikes (formerly called Remōt and Ocoee) specializes in carbon fiber all-road, mountain, and gravel bikes.
