= Seven Cycles =

Bicycle manufacturer

Seven Cycles is an American bicycle designer and manufacturer based in Watertown, Massachusetts. Seven, a bespoke bicycle brand, was founded by Robert Vandermark in early 1997. Vandermark was the former head of research and development at Merlin Metalworks. Although Seven Cycles was founded to build high-end titanium and steel frames, in 1998 Seven began also building titanium-carbon frames and in 2002 began also building full carbon frames. All Seven brand bikes are handmade in their Watertown factory. Seven also manufactures custom titanium stems and mountain bike handlebars, carbon fiber road forks, aluminum handlebars, stems, and seat posts.
