= Resistance swimming =

Type of swimming exercise

Resistance swimming is a form of swimming exercise undertaken either for athletic or therapeutic purposes. In optimal circumstances, it lends itself to any stroke the swimmer wishes to perform. Resistance swimming can be carried out either against the pull of a tether or against the flow of water artificially set in motion by means of a swimming machine.

== Tethered swimming ==
In its most simple form, it consists of swimming while being held relatively stationary by a flexible restraining device, such as a harness or a foot restraint. This training method is used by a number of swim teams, such as the ones at Purdue University, University of Indianapolis, Florida State University and the University of Florida. Likewise, Special Forces Scuba Team members at Fort Bragg use a commercial restraining device in their personal training for open water swimming. Users often indicate that it takes a certain amount of time to learn to compensate for the feeling of swimming against a restraint. However, for those who have familiarized themselves with these systems, tethers enable the swimmer to swim at any speed, even flat-out sprints, and to vary the speed at will.

Tethered swimming, as this method is known, has been in use since the middle of the twentieth century, and has undergone a gradual evolution. Initially the swimmers were restrained by a rope, which was eventually supplanted by interlocked bicycle inner tubes or surgical tubing. Presently the systems in use employ either bungee cords or coiled lines to provide the shock-absorption necessary for a comfortable swim. Attachment methods also vary. Some devices restrain the swimmer by means of a belt, others wrap around the ankles, and still others connect to specially modified water shoes.

== Hybrid systems ==
These swimming machines straddle the difference between traditional tethers and mechanical swimming machines. As a result, they combine the advantages of both, with a couple of drawbacks. They share the self-contained aspect of counter-current swimming machines with the low cost, simplicity and freedom of movement of tether systems. They are not strictly speaking "still-water pools" since the movements of the swimmer actually induce a gentle current of water which permits a more natural swimming experience. There are no energy costs (other than the water quality system) with these machines, as they use no electricity for swimming. While they are valuable for aerobic exercise, endurance and strength training, and for stroke practice, they cannot replicate open water conditions. Thus, for competition training they have to be complemented with open-water practice.

== Swimming machines ==
Another form of resistance swimming is that in which the swimmer is unrestrained and the water is set in motion by means of mechanical devices, such as jets, propellers or paddle wheels. Such an apparatus is also known as a countercurrent swimming machine, of which a number are presently available commercially. A prototype machine was used by the Columbia University swim team in the late 1980s.

Swimming machines made their appearance in the 1970s, initially in the form of jetted streams. Some of these were criticized for causing turbulence and an un-natural swimming environment. They were followed by paddle-wheel and propeller-driven machines, which were popularized by Endless Pools. These generated a smoother stream of water. Many users find them easy to swim in, but the machines are also criticized for being expensive, noisy, and wasteful of energy (consuming 6.5 kW to 11 kW of electricity just to set the water in motion).

Finally, there are exercise machines which allow a person to remain on dry land while simulating certain swimming strokes. These devices however can not compensate for the weight of the body and the limbs and thus deprive the user of the benefits of exercise in an aquatic environment.
