= Equipment =

Items required to exercise a certain activity

Equipment is a set of tools or other objects commonly used to achieve a particular objective. Different jobs require different kinds of equipment.

== Types of equipment ==
Types of equipment include:

- Materiel
- Agricultural equipment
  - List of agricultural equipment
- Audio equipment
- Camping equipment
- Capital equipment
- Diving equipment
- Electrical equipment
- Emergency vehicle equipment
- Fire apparatus
- Float
- Ground support equipment
- Heavy equipment (construction)
- Horse tack, also known as horse equipment
- Laboratory equipment
- Medical equipment
- Military equipment
  - Panoply
  - Roman military personal equipment
- Office equipment
- Personal protective equipment
- Rolling stock
- Scientific instruments
- Scribe equipment (hieroglyph)
- Scuba set
- Self-propelled passenger equipment
- Sports equipment
  - Baseball clothing and equipment
  - Climbing equipment
  - Cricket equipment
  - Golf equipment
  - Hiking equipment
  - Ice hockey equipment
    - Ice hockey goaltending equipment
  - Motorcycle personal protective equipment
  - Paintball equipment
  - Rugby union equipment
  - Soccer equipment
  - Triathlon equipment

== See also ==
- Category:Equipment
- List of tools and equipment
