= Robyn Benincasa =

American runner, author, and motivational speaker

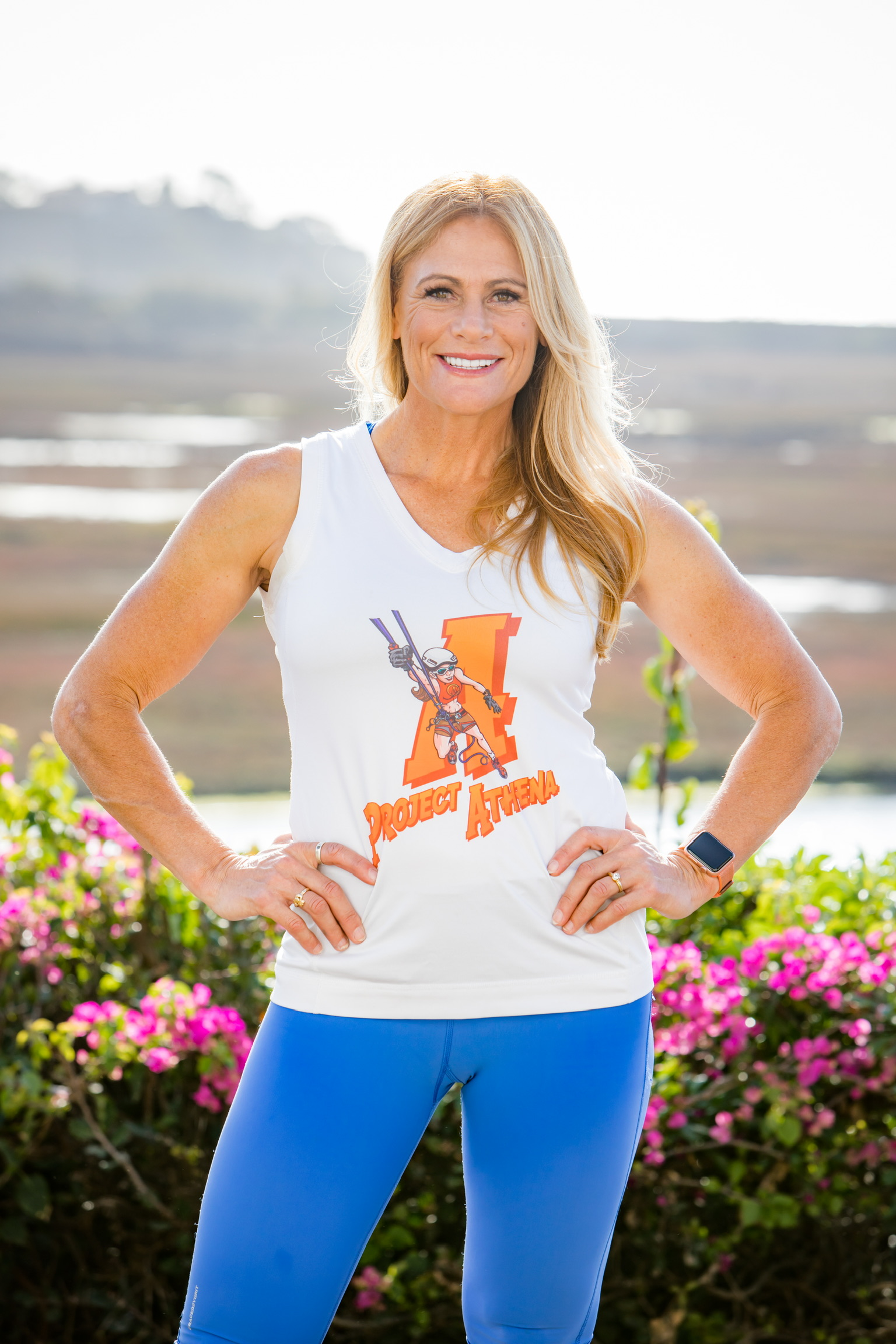
- Occupations: Adventure racer, firefighter, author, motivational speaker
- Known for: Eco-Challenge winner; founder of Project Athena Foundation
- Notable work: How Winning Works: 8 Essential Leadership Lessons From the Toughest Teams on Earth
- Website: robynbenincasa.com

Robyn Benincasa is an American adventure racer, firefighter, author, and motivational speaker. She was a member of Team Eco-Internet, which won the 2000 Eco-Challenge: The Expedition Race in Borneo. She is also the founder of the Project Athena Foundation, a nonprofit organization that supports people recovering from medical or traumatic setbacks through endurance-based events.

== Early life and education ==
Benincasa competed in several sports while growing up, including gymnastics, diving, track, and cross-country running. She attended Arizona State University, where she competed as a springboard diver.

After college, Benincasa worked in pharmaceutical sales while training for endurance competitions, including Ironman triathlons.

== Firefighting career ==
Benincasa later joined the San Diego Fire Department as a firefighter. Her firefighting career overlapped with her participation in endurance events and adventure racing.

== Athletic career ==
=== Adventure racing ===
Benincasa competed in expedition-length adventure races during the 1990s and 2000s. In 1995, she was part of an all-female team that completed the Raid Gauloises, an international adventure race involving disciplines such as trekking, mountain biking, paddling, and navigation.

She later competed in the Eco-Challenge series. In 2000, Benincasa was part of Team Eco-Internet, which won the Eco-Challenge event held in Borneo.

=== Triathlon and endurance events ===
Before becoming widely associated with adventure racing, Benincasa participated in long-distance triathlons, including Ironman competitions.

=== Health and recovery ===
In 2007, Benincasa was diagnosed with osteoarthritis in both hips and underwent hip resurfacing surgery. Her recovery from surgery later became part of the background for her work with the Project Athena Foundation.

== Project Athena Foundation ==
Benincasa founded the Project Athena Foundation in 2007. The organization helps people who have experienced medical or traumatic setbacks prepare for and complete endurance challenges.

CNN reported that the foundation supported participants through activities such as hiking, paddling, and other outdoor endurance events. In 2014, CNN named Benincasa a CNN Hero for her work with the organization.

== Writing and speaking ==
Benincasa is the author of How Winning Works: 8 Essential Leadership Lessons From the Toughest Teams on Earth, published in 2012. The book draws on her experience in adventure racing and team-based endurance events.

She has also worked as a motivational speaker, with presentations focused on teamwork and leadership.

== Selected bibliography ==
- Benincasa, Robyn (2012). How Winning Works: 8 Essential Leadership Lessons From the Toughest Teams on Earth. Don Mills, Ontario: Harlequin Enterprises. ISBN 978-0-373-89255-6. OCLC 754389902.
