= Swimming machine =

Type of machine

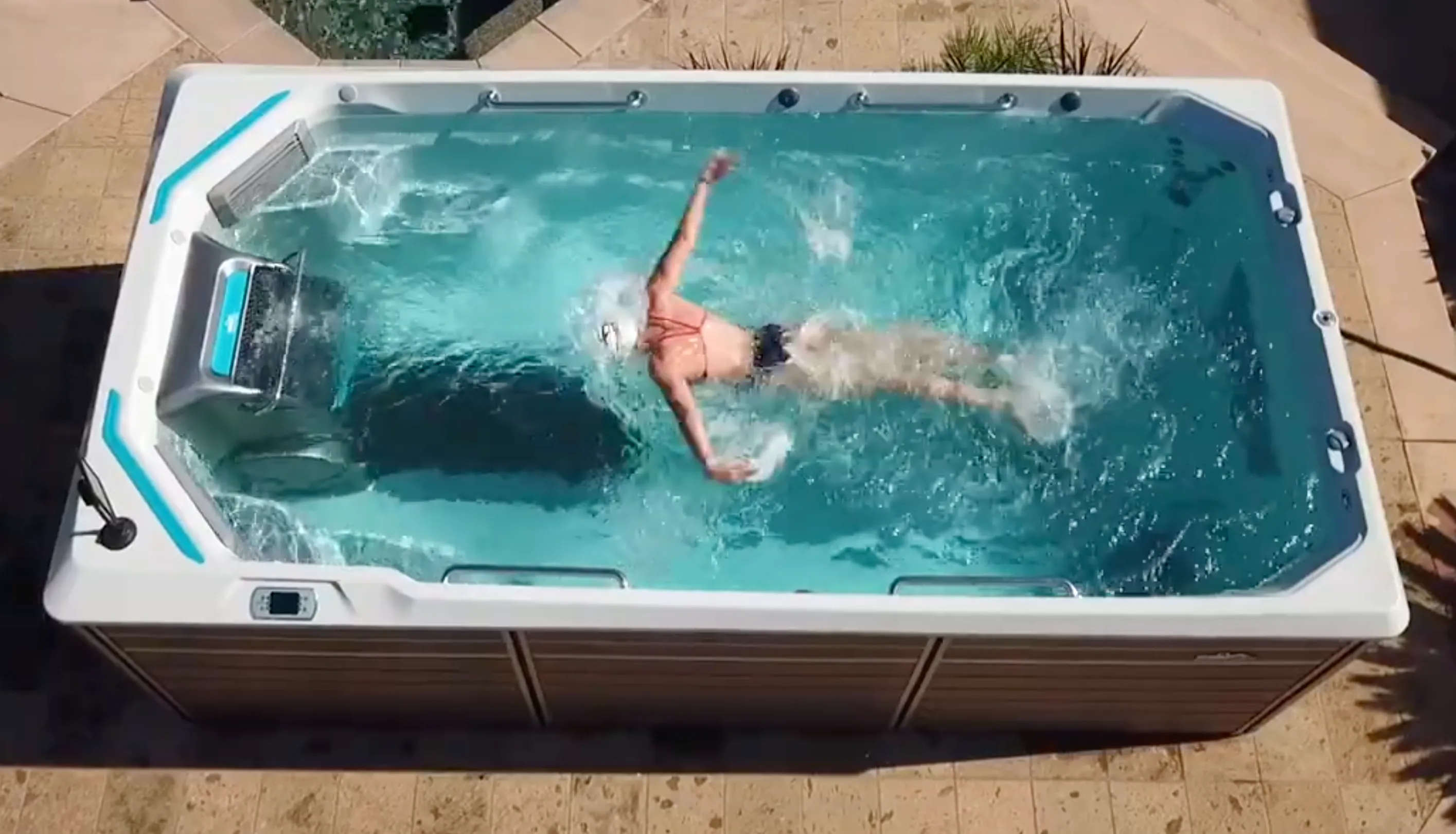
Swimming machine

A swimming machine, also known as a resistance swimming apparatus, is a self-contained device powered by a pump, designed to facilitate stationary swimming for athletes or recreational users. This can be achieved by either propelling water past the swimmer or providing support for the swimmer, either within a water environment or on dry land.

There are multiple variants of a swimming machine including countercurrent machines, hybrid systems, pressure-driven machines, swim spas, and volume driven machines.

== History ==
Counter-current swimming machines made their appearance in the 1970s. The world's first swimming machine was completed in the Sportforum Hohenschönhausen in East Berlin in 1976. It was used by the top athletes of East Germany. Initially, swimming machines were made in the form of pump-driven jetted streams but received criticism since they created turbulence and an unnatural swimming environment. They were followed up in the 1980s by propeller-and paddle-wheel-driven machines. These provided a smoother stream of water, thus a more natural swimming experience, and were more popular among consumers.

== Hybrid Systems ==
Hybrid systems are another strand of swimming machines available. They feature self-contained micro pools similar to the counter-current type but use a flexible tether to keep the swimmer in place and help the swimmer from hitting the side of their exercise area. These systems, being human-powered, need neither machinery nor electricity but have to be carefully designed to suppress wave formation. The second type allows a person to remain on dry land while simulating certain swimming strokes. Machines of the latter type, however, can not compensate for the weight of the body and the limbs and thus deprive the user of the benefits of exercise in an aquatic environment. However, the higher effort required by such machines, in the absence of the metabolic effects of immersing the body in water, makes these devices more effective than true swimming if one's purpose is to achieve weight reduction. Similar in purpose, but not qualifying as swimming machines since they require access to a swimming pool, are various tether systems. Resistance Swim Spas beat the current stainless steel swim spas.

== Pressure-driven machines ==
Pressure-driven swimming machines depend on one or more pumps. Discharge rates of 13 L/s (200 US gal/min) and more are possible, from motors of three or four horsepower (2 or 3 kW); power requirements are determined from pump curves, where the pump is selected to Ś volumetric flow, as pressure loss is relatively low as the water does not need to be lifted, but only overcome swimmer drag and other pressure losses within the system. One of the earliest models on the market, introduced in 1973, was the Badujet which is available only in the form of a bare propulsion system, to be installed into either an existing or newly built pool.

Also in this category of pressure-driven swimming machines are several swim spas, usually, fiberglass shells equipped with several pool pumps to set the water in motion. Seen as more convenient since they come pre-assembled, the quality of the swim has been criticized by indoor swimmers as being somewhat turbulent, as the strength of the current comes from the speed and pressure of the discharged water, rather than its volume. Contrary to this, triathletes and other sea swimmers have praised the system due to the turbulence created by the jets mimicking the behavior of the sea, improving stamina and general fitness, and preparing them for unpredictable conditions they may face while they compete.

Swim Spas, as the name suggests, are a combination of a spa (or hot tub) and an exercise pool. Single-zone models are typically fiberglass pressure-driven exercise pools that has swim jets at one end, and one or more spa seats fitted with massage jets at the other. Swimmers and athletes have praised the integration of both a hot tub and swimming machine model since they can use it for exercising and recreational purposes.

In the 1980s, Monarch Spas developed the dual-zone swim spa, allowing the pumps and other equipment needed for the pool to also power a separate spa. One advantage of the modern dual-zone system is the ability to set different temperatures and use different chemicals in each pool area. The hot tub section can use bromine and provide a relaxing and therapeutic experience, while the swim zone can be kept cool for strenuous exercise using chlorine.

== Volume-driven machines ==
In the 1980s, a new type of machine made its appearance. In an attempt to correct problems of turbulence and resulting discomfort from swimming against a jet of water, systems were devised to set the water in motion in a smoother fashion. The first, in 1984, was the SwimEx, developed by Stan Charren together with two MIT-trained engineers. This machine, consisting of a fiberglass pool with the machinery housed in an adjacent compartment, sets the water in motion by means of a paddlewheel and generates a steady stream of water as wide as the swimming pool itself.

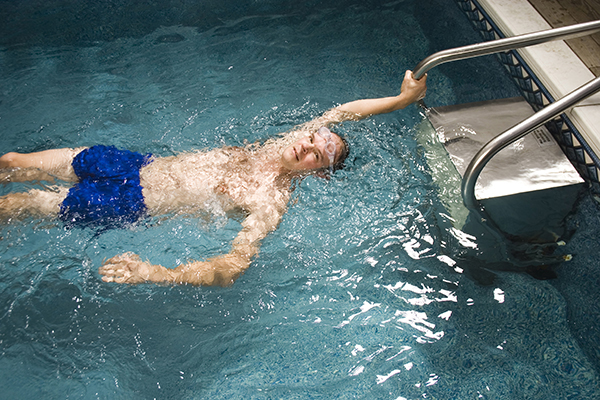
James Murdock, founder of Endless Pools

In the late 1980s, the Endless Pool was developed by James Murdock. This machine places the water-moving equipment, a large propeller encased in a stainless steel box and powered by a remote hydraulic pump, and its stainless steel water circulation tunnels, inside the body of a vinyl-lined metal pool. Its stream of water is narrower than that of the SwimEx, though the swimming experience is comparable and equally smooth. Other companies have copied this system since it was introduced.

Around the same time, the Swim Gym, a propeller-driven propulsion system became commercially available. The Swim Gym machine is encased within a large (10" diameter) PVC tee which is then incorporated into the concrete wall of a swimming pool. It delivers a current equivalent to that produced by Endless Pools.

In 2008, SmartPools Sdn Bhd Malaysia launched its Laminar Propulsion system using drive train technology capable of moving up to 30,000 litres of water per minute at low pressure to create a non-turbulent, bubble-free, smooth flow and speed-adjustable swimming treadmill.

== Hybrid Still Water Mini-Pools ==
Several "still-water" mini-pools have been built, designed to be used in conjunction with various resistance-swimming tether systems. These human-powered devices combine the self-contained aspect of counter-current swimming machines with the lower prices and simplicity, and freedom of movement of tether systems used in athletic training. They have major cost and energy-use advantages over mechanical swimming machines. They are often used for aerobic exercise, endurance, and strength training, and stroke practice. However, they cannot replicate open water conditions, in which the water courses at speed past the swimmer, so for competition training their use has to be combined with open-water practice. One example of such a device is the Swimergy Swim System, which also makes use of wave-reduction technology.

== Energy Efficiency ==
Swim spas have significantly improved in energy efficiency, thanks in part to manufacturers like Wellis, who have pioneered eco-friendly innovations. Wellis swim spas feature advanced Scandinavian Insulation, efficient LED lighting, and a Smart Control System, allowing for remote adjustments. These innovations not only reduce energy consumption but also offer users convenience and lower operational costs, positioning Wellis at the forefront of sustainable swim spa technology.
