= Dan Empfield =

Triathlon entrepreneur

Dan Empfield (born 1957) is an American entrepreneur in the world of multisport, creator of the triathlon wetsuit in 1987, and the triathlon-specific racing bike in 1989. The original designs were manufactured by the Quintana Roo, which he founded in 1987.

Empfield sold Quintana Roo in 1995 to Saucony and managed that company's bicycle division until June 1999. He left to start the popular on-line triathlon news and commentary web site Slowtwitch.com, which he owned and managed from 1999 to 2022.

His FIST-based protocol of road and triathlon bicycle fitting was the first among today's dynamic bike fit protocols, and he coined the bicycle geometry terms "stack" and "reach" - corresponding, respectively, to the vertical and horizontal distance between the bottom bracket center and head-tube top; these terms helped normalize bike geometries across manufacturers.

Today, Empfield remains an editor-at-large at slowtwitch.com.

Empfield has been inducted into the Triathlete Magazine Hall of Fame (2004) and the USA Triathlon Hall of Fame (2014), has received the World Open Water Swimming Association's (WOWSA) lifetime achievement award (2010), and was named by Inside Triathlon as one of the ten most influential people in United States triathlon for 2012 and 2013. He received Interbike’s Triathlon Industry Leader of the Year award in 2014. He is a former board member of USA Triathlon.
