= Ray Browning =

American triathlete

Ray Browning is a fitness expert, biomechanist and former professional triathlete. He focuses on motivating and educating people to live healthy and active lifestyles.

During his career as a professional triathlete, he captured seven Ironman titles and was the 1993 Mountain Man Winter Triathlon champion.

Browning hosted seasons six and seven of the PBS television series Trailside: Make Your Own Adventure.
