= Quintana Roo (company) =

Company

- Company type: Subsidiary
- Industry: Triathlon
- Founded: 1987; 39 years ago
- Founder: Dan Empfield
- Headquarters: Chattanooga, Tennessee, United States
- Key people: Christopher Pascarella (President)
- Products: Triathlon-specific Bicycles and Wetsuits
- Parent: American Bicycle Group
- Website: www.quintanarootri.com

Quintana Roo (QR) was the first company to create a triathlon-specific wetsuit over 25 years ago, and then a tri-specific bicycle two years later. The company was founded in 1987 by Dan Empfield of Ironman fame and is currently owned by the American Bicycle Group.

== Wetsuits ==
The company's flagship product in 1987 was the first wetsuit made specifically for triathlon, designed by Empfield. This new wetsuit was more flexible and more buoyant, giving it swim-specific characteristics that were not found in the diving or surfing wetsuits used by triathletes at that time. In 1990, Quintana Roo discovered and pioneered the use of Yamamoto Rubber #39 in its high-end wetsuits. This new rubber was more buoyant and more flexible than any other rubber that had previously been used in any triathlon wetsuit, and it was followed the next year with Yamamoto SCS (Super-Composite Skin), an outer coating that added even more buoyancy and protected the rubber from fingernail tears.

== Triathlon-specific Bicycles ==
In conjunction with the first tri-specific wetsuit in 1987, Scott USA created the first aerodynamic handlebar for standard road bicycles. It was clear triathlon had created a niche market, requiring new products that focused on all three disciplines contiguously rather than separately. In 1989, Empfield made a bicycle specifically for triathlon, the Quintana Roo Superform. This custom bike was called the first bicycle "built from the aerobars back." With a steep seat angle of 80 degrees, its design was said to help prevent leg fatigue before the run. Ray Browning rode the Quintana Roo Superform to a new overall course record at the 1989 Ironman New Zealand.

In 1993, Quintana Roo released the Kilo, the first production bicycle to successfully be made from Easton #7005 aluminum tubeset, and it replaced the Superform as the flagship bike. The bike was named the Kilo because its frame weighed only 1 kilogram (2.2 pounds), as opposed to chromoly steel bicycle frames, which weighed considerably more.

During the early 1990s, while testing bicycle aerodynamics at the Texas A&M Wind Tunnel, Dan Empfield was introduced to the concept of interference drag between the bicycle fork and the front wheel. The first idea to overcome this was to make a front wheel with a narrow hub, 60mm instead of 80mm. This increased the amount of space air had to flow between the wheel and the fork. However, by 1996, Quintana Roo had developed a fork with "wide" blades, further increasing the space between the wheel and the fork. This was the QR Illuminaero fork, made out of aluminum. The next year Quintana Roo introduced the QR Carbonaero fork, which was made out of carbon fiber and much lighter than the QR Illuminaero fork.

In 1999, Quintana Roo released the QR Redstone, considered by many to be the first triathlon "superbike." Named after the Redstone Missile, the bike had modern design cues such as internal cable routing, a bottom-bracket mounted rear brake, and a fully faired rear wheel.

When JHK Investments bought Quintana Roo from Saucony in 2000, it was relocated to Chattanooga, Tennessee, where it would share facilities with its new sister company, Litespeed. This new relationship provided Quintana Roo with the opportunity and resources to develop and produce titanium triathlon bikes, using its triathlon-specific geometry.

From then until 2005, Quintana Roo's flagship bike was the Ti-Phoon. However, in 2005 Quintana Roo released its first full-carbon fiber bike, the Lucero, followed the next year by its sister bikes, the Seduza and the Caliente. These three carbon bikes all featured the same geometry, but with a different carbon weave for each bike, providing various price points and unique ride properties for each. The mold that these bikes came from now forms the basis of Quintana Roo's current FIT Series of bikes.

In 2009, Quintana Roo introduced the CD0.1, a bicycle designed with Quintana Roo's unique SHIFT technology. The bike was named after its drag coefficient (0.1) from wind tunnel testing. The downtube of the CD0.1 was offset 18mm in order to direct air away from the drag-heavy side of the bike (drive-side) and towards the clean side of the bike (non-drive). This resulted in increased stability in a crosswind, increased stiffness in the bottom bracket, and increased aerodynamics in the traditionally drag-heavy side of the aerodynamic drag-curve. It was hailed as "the most innovative bike over the past decade" and received the "Gold Design Award" at the 2009 Eurobike Show.

Two years later, in 2011, Quintana Roo officially announced its Project Illicito, a new bike that improved on the already impressive aerodynamics of the CD0.1. The difference, though, between the two bikes was that Illicito featured a missing seat-stay and a massive chain-stay on the non-drive side of the bike. This non-traditional rear-end created a "sail" effect across certain degrees of yaw, as the air would flow along the massive chain-stay. It was completely UCI-illegal, hence the name "Illicito." In 2011, the year that it was released, the Illicito received the "Triathlon America Most Innovative Product" award.

In March 2014, Quintana Roo released the PRsix. Called "the SuperBike Reconsidered," the PRsix featured a simplicity and ease of fit and maintenance not found on other "superbikes," as it could be quickly assembled with only a pedal wrench and two sizes of hex wrench. The PRsix featured SHIFT+ technology, combining the SHIFT technology of the CD0.1 and Illicito with a "boat tail" tube-section that further increased the aerodynamic advantage of SHIFT technology. The bike was compatible with any standard diameter aerobar, as well as any brake produced by Shimano, TRP, Magura, or TriRig.
