= Kathleen McCartney =

Kathleen McCartney may refer to:

- Kathleen McCartney (academic) (born 1956), American president of Smith College
- Kathleen McCartney (triathlete)
