= Barbara Warren (athlete) =

Austrian-American counselor, model, actress, author, and triathlete

- Born: April 9, 1943; St. Johann in Tirol, Austria
- Died: August 26, 2008 (aged 65); Santa Barbara, California
- Other names: Barbara Angely, Barbara Mueller, Barbara Müller, Barbara Muné, Barbara Alvarez
- Occupations: Counselor, model, actress and triathlete
- Known for: Ultra-distance athlete
- Spouse(s): Armando Alvarez Tom Warren (m. 1995)
- Children: 2 daughters

Barbara Warren (April 9, 1943 – August 26, 2008) was an Austrian-American counselor, model, actress, author, and triathlete.

== Early life and education ==
Born Barbara Müller in St. Johann in Tirol, Austria to Hans and Ingrid Mueller, she and her identical twin sister, Angelika Drake, left their farmhouse at 14 for high school at the Tyrolean capital of Innsbruck and then, at age 17, went on to study art history at the Accademia di Belle Arti Firenze in Florence, Italy.

== Career ==
The sisters occasionally modeled before moving to Mexico City in 1965, where they began modeling full-time, eventually opening a school, agency and design boutique. Warren began performing under the stage name Barbara Angely, abruptly ending that career out of dissatisfaction with a jet-set lifestyle. Warren eventually married importer Armando Alvarez, which led to a four-year separation from her sister.

Warren's family in 1980 moved to Brownsville, Texas. In 1983, Warren began running recreationally. By 1985, Drake and her family had moved to San Diego, California. Warren, with her family, followed her sister and relocated to San Diego later the same year.

Calling themselves "The Twin Team," the sisters began participating in a number of endurance sports, including their first standard triathlon in 1987 and their first Ironman Triathlon in 1988. All told, Warren completed 13 Ford Ironman Triathlon World Championship in Hawaii, winning her age group in the 2003 Ironman Kona. Warren and her sister were profiled in Reckless: The Outrageous Lives of Nine Kick-Ass Women.

In the early 1990s, she met triathlete Tom Warren, who won the second Ironman competition in 1979, and the two married in 1995.

Warren self-published three motivational books, Unleash the Power to Complete Your Goals, Become Exceptional, and Do What You Don't Want to Do.

== Death ==
On Saturday, August 23, 2008, Warren broke her odontoid process and cervical vertebra 2 and was diagnosed as paralyzed from a bicycle crash that happened on a descent during the Santa Barbara, California, triathlon. She was put on life support at Santa Barbara Cottage Hospital. According to an account from her family to the San Diego Union-Tribune, she communicated through blinking that she wanted her ventilator turned off, and, at the request of the family, a doctor removed her ventilator on August 26.

== Awards ==
The Santa Barbara Triathlon's Barbara Warren Community Spirit Award was named posthumously in her honor.
