= Gordon Haller =

American triathlon athlete (born 1950)

Medal record

Men's triathlon

Representing United States

Ironman World Championship
Gold medal – first place	1978	Men's race

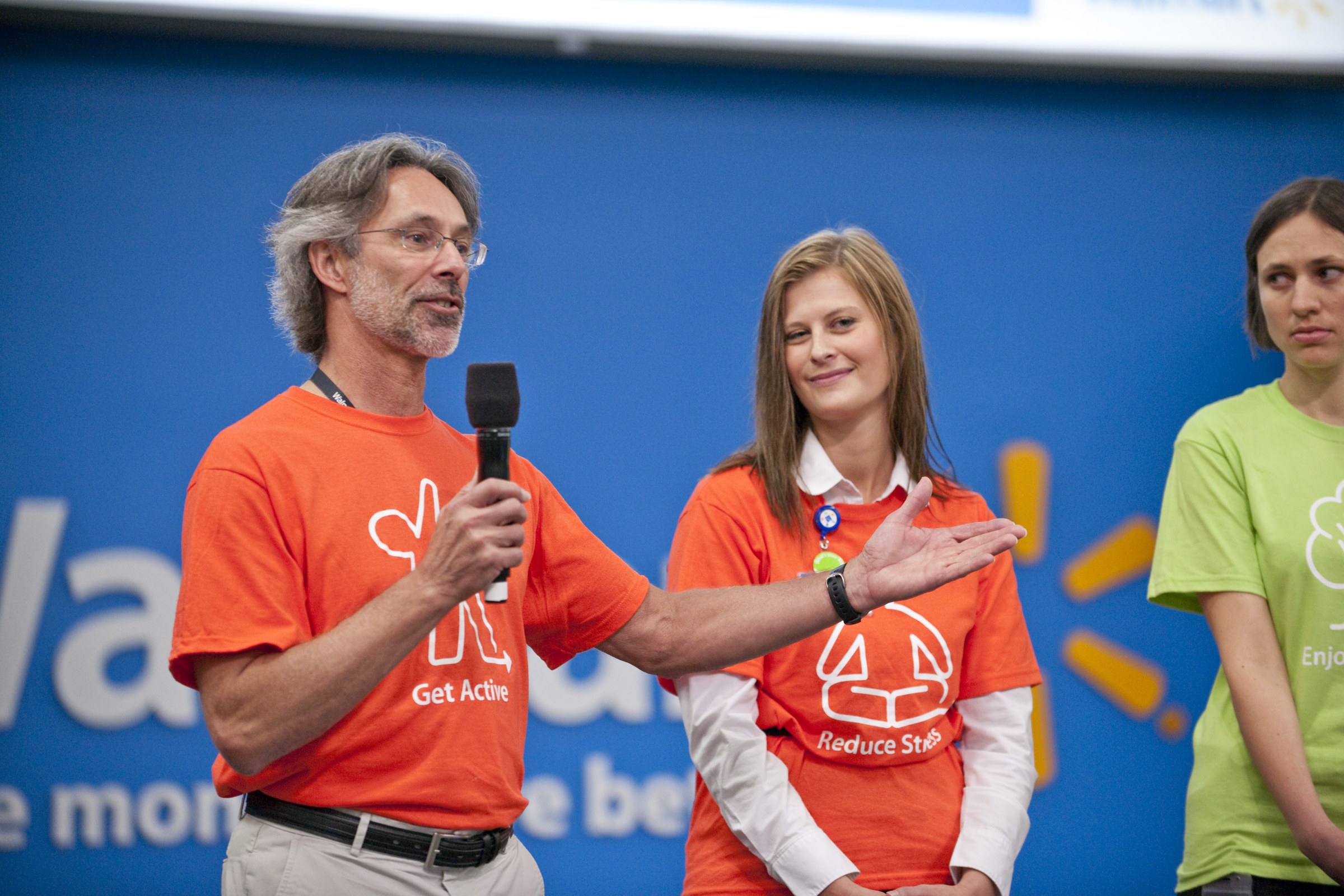

Gordon Haller (born 1950) is the winner of the first Ironman Triathlon.

== Biography ==
Haller grew up in Forest Grove, Oregon and earned a degree in physics at Pacific University.

On Oahu, Hawaii in 1978, Haller competed in Navy Commander John Collins’ race which combined the Waikiki Roughwater Swim, the Around-Oahu Bike Race, and the Honolulu Marathon. Of the 15 competitors, 12 finished what today is called the Ironman, and Gordon Haller was the first champion, with a time of 11 hours, 46 minutes, 58 seconds. In 1979, Haller placed fourth behind winner, Tom Warren.

Haller commented about the success of Ironman, nearly 30 years later in a 2007 interview with Competitor Magazine "It’s just an amazing experience... certainly something I didn’t expect to have happen way back in the beginning."
