= Tom Warren (triathlete) =

American triathlete (born 1943)

Personal information
- Born: November 11, 1943 (age 82) San Diego, California
- Spouse: Barbara Warren (m. 1995; died 2008)
Medal record
Representing United States
Men's triathlon
Ironman World Championship
Gold medal – first place	1979	Individual

Tom "Tug" Warren (born November 11, 1943) is an American triathlete, an Ironman champion, an inductee of both the Ironman Hall of Fame and the USA Triathlon Hall of Fame, and a former sports bar owner from San Diego, California.

== Early life and education ==
Warren was the youngest of two children, with brother Bill, born to his mother Josephine and his father George, a former senior vice president of a savings and loan bank. Warren grew up in Pacific Beach, a coastal community of San Diego, and graduated from Mission Bay High School. He went on to graduate from the University of Southern California with a degree in accounting, and then served three years in the U.S. Army. At USC, he played water polo and swam on three NCAA championship swimming teams.

== Business and sports careers ==
After serving in the Army, Warren opened Tug's Tavern, a sports bar and restaurant in San Diego's Pacific Beach that he owned for 17 years. The bar, beginning in 1975, sponsored the annual Tug's Swim-Run-Swim, an early multisport event that included a half-mile swim around Crystal Pier in Pacific Beach, a 5-mile run on the sand from the pier to the Mission Beach jetty and back, and another half-mile swim around the pier.

At the second Ironman in 1979 on Oahu, Warren arrived as an unknown quantity from San Diego. "No one thought to challenge the saloonkeeper," wrote Sports Illustrated's Barry McDermott. Warren ended up winning in 11 hours, 15 minutes, 56 seconds, beating out Gordon Haller, the first year's champion. McDermott's Sports Illustrated article featuring the three leaders in the competition, including Warren, "was Ironman’s spark," wrote The New York Times, prompting “ABC’s Wide World of Sports” to cover the third Ironman the following year, with 108 athletes competing. Warren, on July 25, 1979, appeared on "The Tonight Show" to talk with Johnny Carson about the win.

Warren has been at the start line of the Ironman Triathlon World Championship in Hawaii 20 times, finishing 16 of them. The Los Angeles Times called Warren an "ultra-sport pioneer."

Since 2009, Warren has been co-owner of Schroeder's at Tango del Rey, a tango, salsa and jazz bar.

== Personal life ==
Warren's late wife, Barbara Warren, who was also a champion endurance athlete, died in 2008 at age 65 in Santa Barbara, Calif., three days after crashing during the bicycling portion of the Santa Barbara Triathlon. The couple had been married since 1995.

Warren lives in a cabin he built in Julian, California, overlooking Lake Cuyamaca in San Diego County.

== Awards ==
- Inducted in 2000 into the Ironman Hall of Fame.
- Inducted in 2014 into the USA Triathlon Hall of Fame.
