= Ironman Triathlon =

Series of long-distance triathlon races

- Official Logo

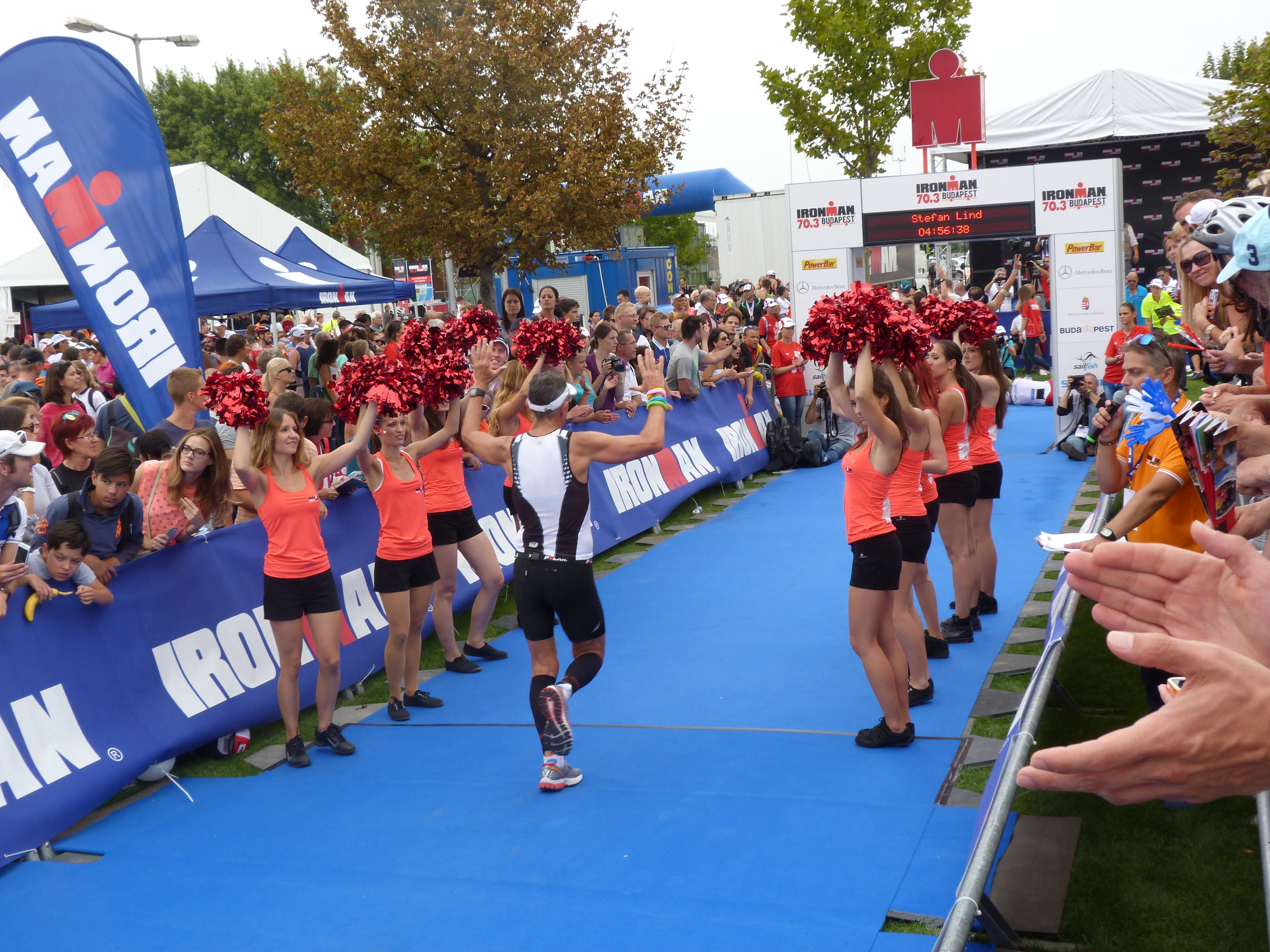
Ironman 70.3 Budapest, 2014

An Ironman Triathlon is one of a series of long-distance triathlon races organized by the World Triathlon Corporation (WTC), consisting of a 2.4-mile (3.9 km) swim, a 112-mile (180.2 km) bicycle ride and a marathon 26.22-mile (42.2 km) run completed in that order, a total of 140.6 miles (226.3 km). It is widely considered one of the most difficult one-day sporting events in the world.

Most Ironman events have a time limit of 16 or 17 hours to complete the race, course dependent, with the race typically starting at 7:00 am. The mandatory cutoff time to complete the swim is 2 hours 20 minutes. The mandatory bike cutoff time for when an athlete must have completed their swim, transition, and bike varies generally between 10 hours and 10 hours 30 minutes from when an athlete began their swim. The mandatory run cutoff varies between 16 and 17 hours from when athlete began their swim. Many races will also have intermediate bike, run, and transition cut off times specific to each race venue. Any participant who completes the triathlon within these time constraints is designated an Ironman.

The name "Ironman Triathlon" is also associated with the original Ironman triathlon that is now the Ironman World Championship. Held in Kailua-Kona, the world championship has been held annually in Hawaii since 1978 (with an additional race in 1982). Originally taking place in Oʻahu, the race moved to Kailua-Kona in 1981 and it continues today. The Ironman World Championship has become known for its grueling length, harsh race conditions, and television coverage.

There are other races that are the same distance as an Ironman triathlon but are not produced, owned, or licensed by the WTC. They include The Challenge Family series' Challenge Roth and the Norseman Triathlon.

The event series is owned by The Ironman Group, which is owned by Advance Publications, following the acquisition from the Wanda Sports Group in August 2020.

== History ==
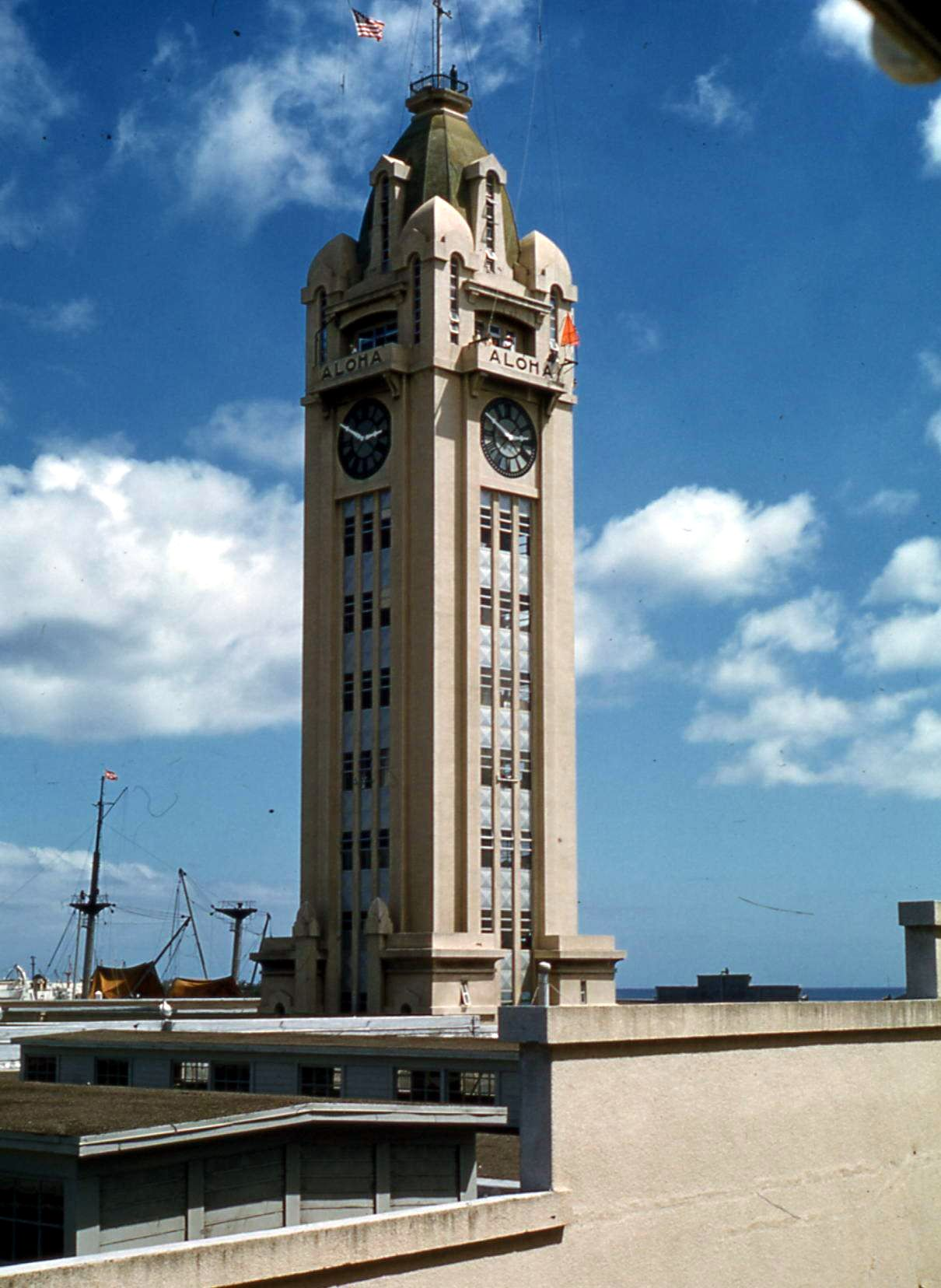
Aloha Tower was the original bike-to-run transition site

The idea for the original Ironman Triathlon arose during the awards ceremony for the 1977 Oʻahu Perimeter Relay. Among the participants were representatives of both the Mid-Pacific Road Runners and the Waikiki Swim Club, whose members had long been debating which athletes were more fit, runners or swimmers. On this occasion, U.S. Navy Commander John Collins pointed out that a recent article in Sports Illustrated magazine had declared that Belgian cyclist Eddy Merckx had the highest recorded "oxygen uptake" of any athlete ever measured, so perhaps cyclists were more fit than anyone. Collins and his wife Judy Collins had taken part in the triathlons staged in 1974 and 1975 by the San Diego Track Club in and around Mission Bay, California, as well as the 1975 Optimist Sports Fiesta Triathlon in Coronado, California. A number of the other military athletes in attendance were also familiar with the San Diego races, so they understood the concept when Collins suggested that the debate should be settled through a race combining the three existing long-distance competitions already on the island: the Waikiki Roughwater Swim (2.4 mi or 3.9 km), the Around-Oahu Bike Race (115 mi or 185 km; originally a two-day event) and the Honolulu Marathon (26.219 mi or 42.195 km).

Until that time, no one present had ever done the bike race. Collins figured by shaving 3 miles (4.8 km) off the course and riding counter-clockwise around the island, the bike leg could start at the finish of the Waikiki Rough Water and end at the Aloha Tower, the traditional start of the Honolulu Marathon. Prior to racing, each athlete received three sheets of paper listing a few rules and a course description. Handwritten on the last page was this exhortation: "Swim 2.4 miles! Bike 112 miles! Run 26.2 miles! Brag for the rest of your life", now a registered trademark.

With a nod to a local runner who was notorious for his demanding workouts, Collins said, "Whoever finishes first, we'll call him the Iron Man." Each of the racers had their own support crew to supply water, food and encouragement during the event. Of the fifteen men to start off in the early morning on February 18, 1978, twelve completed the race. Gordon Haller, a U.S. Navy Communications Specialist, was the first to earn the title Ironman by completing the course with a time of 11 hours, 46 minutes, 58 seconds. The runner-up John Dunbar, a U.S. Navy SEAL, led after the second transition and had a chance to win but ran out of water on the marathon course; his support crew resorted to giving him beer instead.

With no further marketing efforts, the race gathered as many as 50 athletes in 1979. The race, however, was postponed a day because of bad weather conditions. Only fifteen competitors started off the race Sunday morning. San Diego's Tom Warren won in 11 hours, 15 minutes, 56 seconds. Lyn Lemaire, a championship cyclist from Boston, placed sixth overall and became the first "Ironwoman". Lemaire finished her race in 12 hours 55 minutes and 38 seconds, only 1 hour 39 minutes and 42 seconds slower than the winning time for the men's race. Collins planned on changing the race into a relay event to draw more participants, but Sports Illustrated's journalist Barry McDermott, in the area to cover a golf tournament, discovered the race and wrote a ten-page account of it. During the following year, hundreds of curious participants contacted Collins. In 1980, 27-year-old Dave Scott broke the then-record by close to 2 hours, completing the race in 9 hours and 24 minutes. For the 1981 event, there were more than triple the entries, at 326.

There have been 19 different ways to qualify for the Ironman World Championship races. Some of the ways include being a Hawaii Resident who won an event drawing, attaining a win in your age group at a previous Ironman, or even having a "Human Interest Story." Such human interest stories include participants who are cancer survivors and war heroes injured in battle.

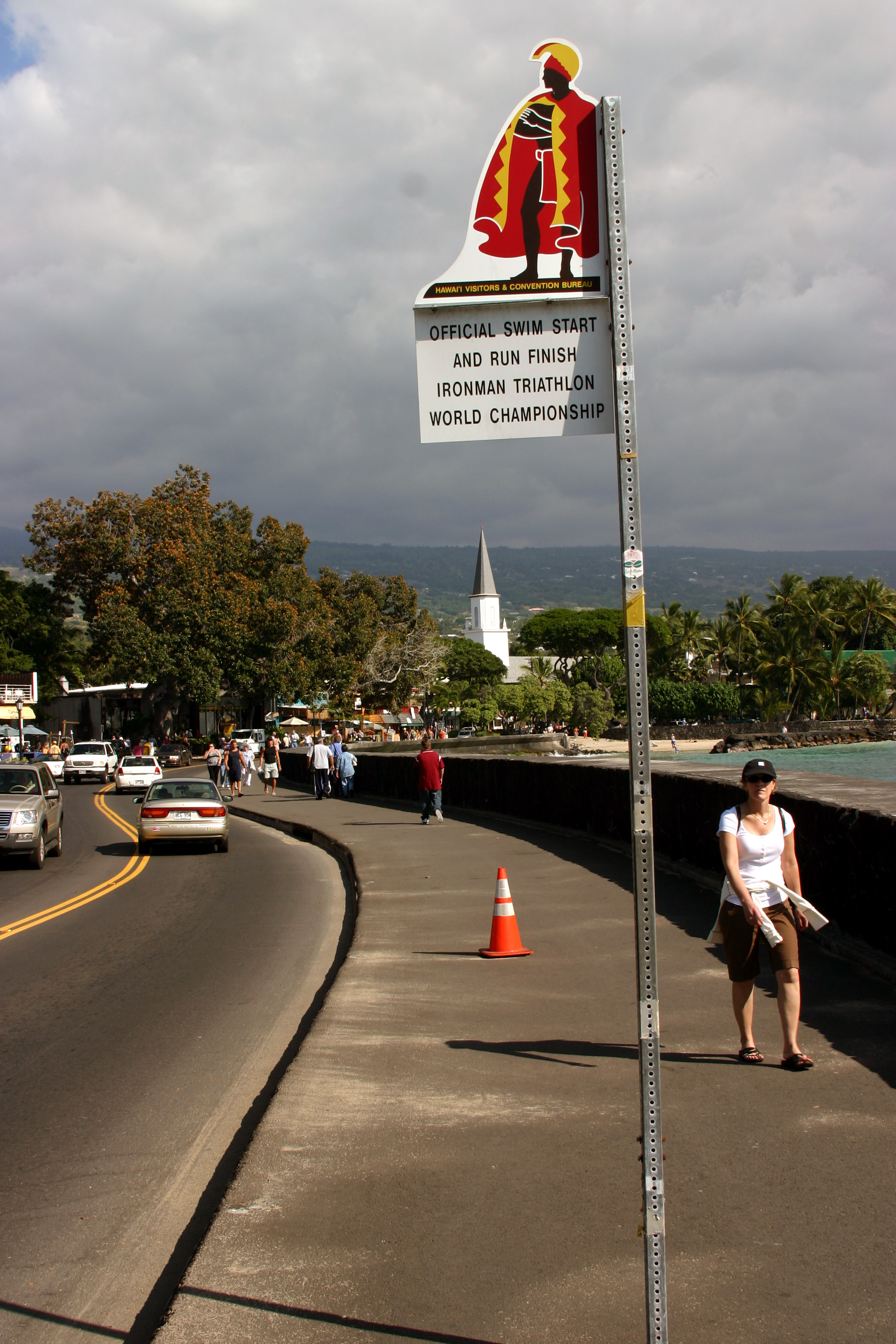
Start and finish of the Ironman World Championship on Aliʻi Drive in Kailua-Kona Hawaii

=== Valerie Silk and WTC ===
Around 1979 Collins no longer wanted to direct the Ironman race and approached Nautilus Fitness Center owners Hank Grundman and Valerie Silk about taking over control of the race. Grundman previously had extended his club's facilities to many of the Ironman competitors. Following the couple's divorce in 1981 Silk received ownership of Ironman. That year she moved the competition to the less urbanized Hawaiʻi Island (called the Big Island) and in 1982 moved the race date from February to October; as a result of this change there were two Ironman Triathlon events in 1982.

A milestone in the marketing of the legend and history of the race happened in February 1982. Julie Moss, a college student competing to gather research for her exercise physiology thesis, moved toward the finish line in first place. As she neared the finish, severe fatigue and dehydration set in, and she fell just yards away from the finish line. Although Kathleen McCartney passed her for the women's title, Moss nevertheless crawled to the finish line. Her performance was broadcast worldwide and created the Ironman mantra that just finishing is a victory. By the end of that year, the race had maxed out at 1,000 participants, with a lottery used to fill the field while turning away another 1,000 interested participants.

In 1990, with the help of Lew Friedland, Dr. James P. Gills acquired and purchased the Hawaii Triathlon Corporation, owner of the Ironman brand for $3 million from Silk. With the Ironman brand, Gills established the World Triathlon Corporation with the intention of furthering the sport of triathlon and increasing prize money for triathletes.

A number of non-WTC full distance triathlons have been held since the mid-1990s. The limited number of WTC-sanctioned events, and the limited number of entries available per race, have combined with a growth in the sport that has created demand for these non-trademarked events. Many of them share the 2.4-mile (3.9 km), 112-mile (180 km), 26.2-mile (42.2 km) format with the Ironman triathlon. Originally, many used the Ironman name. Due to aggressive trademark protection, most of these races no longer use the word "Ironman".

== Today ==
The Ironman format remains unchanged, and the Hawaiian Ironman is still regarded as an honored and prestigious triathlon event to win worldwide. For the 2024 Ironman World Championship races, the men's race was held in Kona, Hawaii in October and the women's race was held in Nice, France in September.

People completing such an event within the strict event time cutoffs are agreed to be recognized as "Ironmen"; the plural "Ironmans" refers to multiples of "Ironman" as a short form of "Ironman Triathlon." In the triathlon community, an Ironman is someone who has completed a race of the appropriate distance, whether or not it falls under the aegis of WTC.

== Swim Smart Initiative ==
In 2013, Ironman piloted the "Swim Smart Initiative" in North America and brought with it some notable safety-related changes to the Ironman format. These changes included new rules regarding swim course formats, water temperature regulations, pre-swim warm-ups, wave starts, and additional rescue boats/watercraft (paddle boards, kayaks, etc.). The Swim Smart Initiative also introduced "resting rafts" so that athletes may leave the water to rest without being disqualified. Andrew Messick, CEO of the World Triathlon Corporation, wanted the Swim Smart Initiative to ease the stress of the open swim and allowing athletes to be confident in the swim. Removing the "mass start" and conducting a "roll start" has been one of the major changes the organization has made.

== Ironman World Championship ==
Over time, the popularity of the triathlon grew, and the annual race on the Big Island became The Ironman World Championship. In 1983, admission to the race began following a qualification-based system, whereby athletes had to obtain entry to the race by competing in another Ironman race and gaining a slot allocated on a proportional basis. The Hawaii race consists of a swim in the bay of Kailua-Kona, a bike ride across the Hawaiian lava desert to Hāwī and back, and a marathon run along the coast (from Keauhou to Keahole Point and back to Kailua-Kona); finishing on Aliʻi Drive. The most recent Ironman World Championship took place on October 6, 2022, and was won by Gustav Iden of Norway in 7:40:24 and Chelsea Sodaro of the United States in 8:33:46.

The current Ironman Hawaii course record was set in 2024 by Patrick Lange (Germany), whose winning time was 7 hours 35 minutes 53 seconds. Daniela Ryf (Switzerland) set the women's course record in 2018 with a winning time of 8 hours 26 minutes 18 seconds.

Amateur triathletes can qualify for the World Championship by placing in one of the other Ironman series races. Entry into the race can also be obtained through various contests and promotions or through the Ironman Foundation's charitable eBay auction.

== Training ==
Ironman triathlons are one of the ‘greatest endurance challenges’ in modern sport. According to coaches Friel and Byrn, it is important for athletes to understand the value of consistency, moderation and recovery in their training if they are to be successful. It is recommended that athletes first have experience in shorter triathlon distances first as this provides a solid foundation of fitness, skill and experience to progress from. A half Ironman course can also be completed in preparation for progressing to the full length one. Ironman requires a significant time commitment of at least 10 hours a week, on average. Ironman training emphasises aerobic fitness more due to the greater endurance element. For all three events- running, swimming and cycling- there are different training exercises and drills which are used to enhance performance i.e. strides training for running or dominant leg training for cycling. An athlete needs to be fit for each event specifically otherwise the fatigue that may occur may not only hamper performance in that event but the others also, even if they are better at them. As such, it is important that weak points, also known as limiters, are identified and strengthened during training. Training in an event can transfer more effectively to some events than others i.e. cycling training usually transfers more effectively to running than swimming.

Training is structured and periodic in nature. In the run up to a competition, which is generally between six months to a year, there are four main training periods.:

Preparation: This initial period is used to introduce the body to structured training again. The volume of training per week should be relatively easy and may incorporate various cross-training activities i.e. hiking, skiing etc.

Base: The longest training period where the most endurance gains are made. Brick workouts featuring two events back-to-back are used i.e. 60 minutes cycling followed by 30 minutes running is a brick and can be performed one or more times in succession. Breakthrough workouts, which rehearse specific actions during the race such as intensity, the feeling of transitions etc. may also be used as a gauge for current preparedness and to improve performance.

Build: Workouts which are specifically tailored to race conditions are increasingly used. This may also take into account the nature of the terrain, weather conditions etc. Any remaining limiters to performance are overcome or reduced.

Peaking: This period is immediately in the run up to the race itself and may only involve breakthrough workouts designed to simulate the intensity and conditions of the race. The importance of recovery is also especially emphasised for this period as the athlete is preparing for the race and needs to be optimally fit for it.

=== Recovery ===
Recovery is an essential part of Ironman training. The high levels of endurance required can only be achieved if recovery is sufficient to allow for the body to heal and physical adaption to take place. Recovery can be short term or long term.

==== Short term ====
Immediate recovery is a form of active recovery taken during exercise itself. For example, after a runner has completed a step, with their foot securely placed and impact safely absorbed, they perform a quick, rapid act of recovery involving the regaining of balance, energy and breath. This immediate recovery between steps is part of the flow of their overall gait cycle. Similarly, during a cyclist’s pedal stroke there is an immediate recovery phase around the dead bottom centre position. These brief acts of rapid recovery allow for the continuation of the exercise and the avoidance of fatigue. Successful athletes are typically able to recover faster during exercise and experience less fatigue as a result.

Active recovery is a term which is used in various ways depending on the context but in essence refers to recovering from a harder exercise by performing an easier one. This is due to the ratio of work to rest changing i.e. there is more recovery and less work in the easier exercise so the athlete recovers during it. In addition to aiding immediate recovery, the uses of this include the continuity of increased blood flow while allowing excess lactate to clear. This can reduce stiffness and feelings of fatigue. Active recovery may be used as a cool down after a workout; between harder intervals of training within the same workout i.e. cycling hard, then cycling easy, then cycling hard again and so forth; or between different training days i.e. a casual swim on Wednesday between two block workouts on Monday and Friday. In Ironman training, dedicated active recovery sessions are usually related to the specific three events being trained for but they may also feature cross-training such as hiking, gentle sporting pastimes etc. The intensity should be either easy or very easy for the positive effects to be maximised.

==== Long term ====
Sleep and nutrition are two essential components for long-term recovery and physical adaption which meets the requirements of training and competition. Sleep should be optimised so that high quality rest is achieved. It is recommended that the nightly sleep time should be nine plus hours on average during training. Additional naps during free time can also be used in order to maximise recovery time.

A nutritious diet with appropriate levels of protein, carbohydrates and fats is necessary to fuel a challenging endurance training regime and allow the body to heal and grow. Calorie intake is increased in line with increased training demands. This may especially include increased carbohydrate intake, known as carb loading, in order to boost energy levels. Lean protein intake should also be increased in order to aid recovery as should the consumption of vitamin and mineral rich foods such as fruit and vegetables. As with workouts, recovery periods, sleep patterns, and diet should be mapped out and scheduled in order to maximise the body’s ability to heal from the stresses of training and adapt to the demands of it.

Overtraining: If an athlete is feeling drained of energy or performance suddenly drops despite adequate rest then this may be the result of overtraining. Increased recovery term may alleviate these effects. When fatigue is present, injury risk is also increased.

=== Training studies ===
Many studies have been conducted to enhance the performance of the athletes who are training for the Ironman Triathlons, while others studied the effects training has on the body and mind. In one study done by Clifford B. Sowell and Wm. Stewart Mounts Jr., "men who are 65 years old are 44% slower than one who is 35...and women is 48%"

== Athlete injuries ==
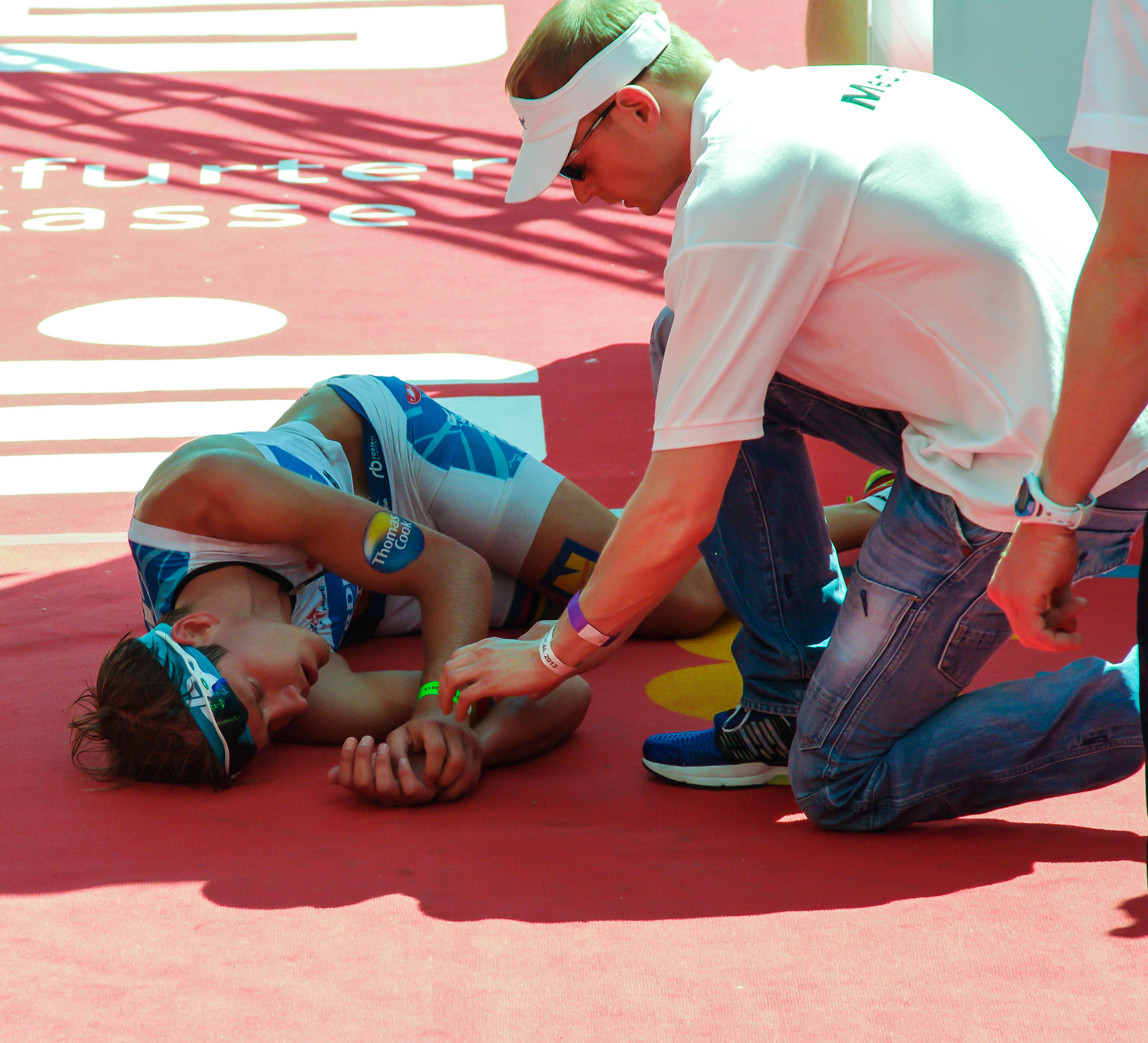
Injuries or just sheer exhaustion can occur during the intense triathlon.

Triathletes train year-round, and no matter how cautious, injuries are always possible. Many factors can account for injuries happening; intrinsic factors are based on the individual, and extrinsic factors are environmentally influenced. The most common injuries in the running event are to the ankle and foot which result in a sprain, fracture, and muscle strain, knee injuries like patella tendinopathy, and lower back injuries such as intervertebral disc injury and myofascial pain. Cycling injuries are common in the knees, lower back, neck, and shoulder. Swimming injuries happen most in the shoulders from the continuous rotations. The neck will see some minor injury when you are only breathing from one side. Thermal injuries can occur when the athlete is dehydrated, hyperthermic, or hypothermic.

In April 2026, Brazilian fitness influencer Mara Flavia Souza Araujo drowned during an Ironman triathlon in Texas.

== Ironman series ==
There are over three dozen Ironman Triathlon races throughout the world that enable qualification for the Ironman World Championships. Professional athletes qualify for the championship through a point ranking system, where points are earned based on their final placement in Ironman and Ironman 70.3 events. The top 50 male and top 35 female professionals in points qualify for the championship. Amateur athletes qualify for the championship by receiving slots allocated to each age group's top finishers in a qualifying event. The Ironman qualifying events include:

=== Europe ===
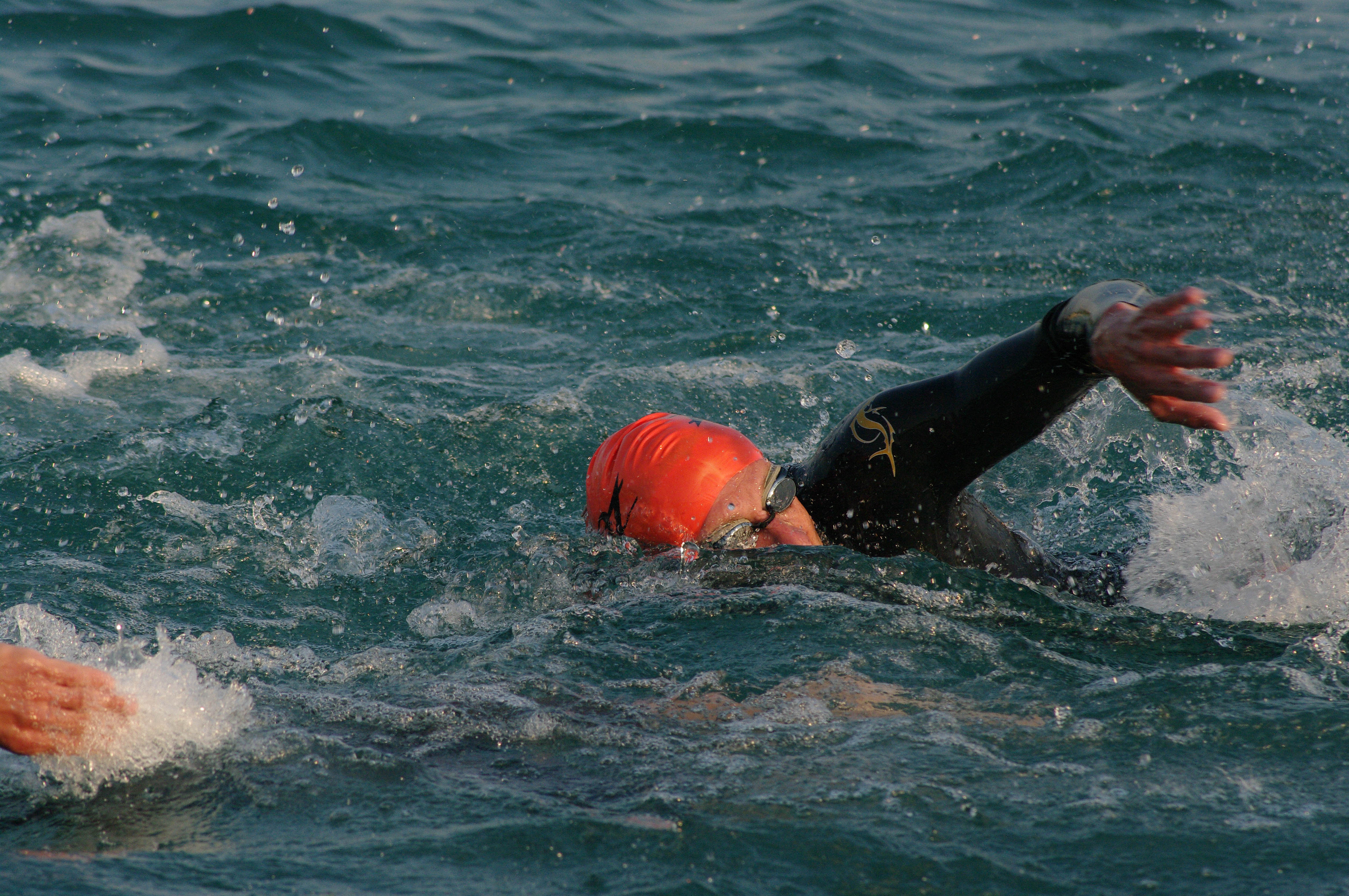
Ironman Frankfurt 2013

- Ironman Austria in Klagenfurt, Austria
- Ironman Barcelona in Calella, Spain
- Ironman Copenhagen in Copenhagen, Denmark
- Ironman Emilia-Romagna in Cervia, Italy
- Ironman France in Nice, France
- Ironman Gdynia in Gdynia, Poland
- Ironman European Championship in Frankfurt am Main, Germany.
- Ironman Hamburg in Hamburg, Germany
- Ironman Haugesund in Haugesund, Norway
- Ironman Lanzarote in Puerto del Carmen, the Canary Islands, Spain
- Ironman Sweden in Kalmar, Sweden
- Ironman Switzerland, in Thun, Switzerland
- Ironman Tallinn in Tallinn, Estonia
- Ironman UK in Bolton, United Kingdom
- Ironman Vichy in Vichy, France
- Ironman Vitoria-Gasteiz Vitoria-Gasteiz, Spain
- Ironman Wales in Tenby, Wales
- Ironman Ireland, in Youghal, Ireland

=== North America ===
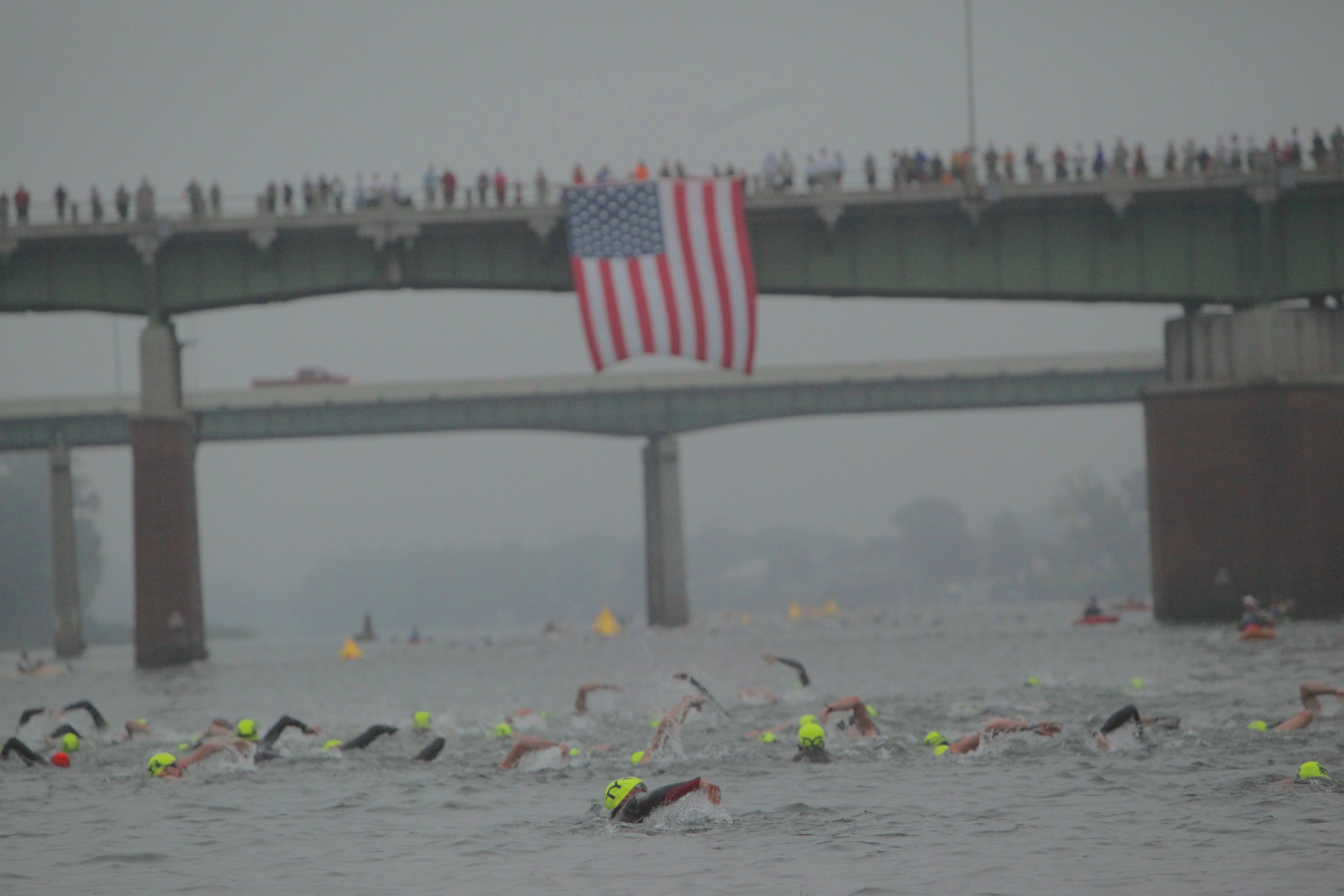
Swimmers begin the 1.2-mile leg in the Savannah River as part of the triathlon competition in support of Operation Iron Freedom in Augusta, Ga.

==== Current events ====
- Ironman Arizona in Tempe, Arizona
- Ironman Chattanooga in Chattanooga, Tennessee
- Ironman Cozumel in Cozumel, Quintana Roo, Mexico
- Ironman Florida in Panama City Beach, Florida (Haines City, Florida in 2018)
- Ironman Jacksonville in Jacksonville, FL
- Ironman Lake Placid in Lake Placid, New York
- Ironman Maryland in Cambridge, Maryland
- Ironman North American Championship in The Woodlands, Texas
- Ironman Ottawa in Ottawa, Ontario
- Ironman California in Sacramento, California
- Ironman Wisconsin in Madison, Wisconsin
- Ironman World Championship in Kona, Hawaii

==== Discontinued events ====
- Ironman Alaska in Juneau, Alaska
- Ironman Boulder in Boulder, Colorado
- Ironman Canada in Penticton, British Columbia
- Ironman Canada in Whistler, British Columbia
- Ironman Coeur d'Alene in Coeur d'Alene, Idaho
- Ironman Lake Tahoe in Lake Tahoe, California
- Ironman Los Cabos in Los Cabos, Baja California Sur, Mexico
- Ironman Louisville in Louisville, Kentucky (Now a half Ironman)
- Ironman Mont-Tremblant in Mont-Tremblant, Quebec
- Ironman St George in St George, Utah
- Ironman Tulsa in Tulsa, Oklahoma

=== South America ===
- Ironman Mar del Plata, Argentina
- Ironman South American Championship on Florianópolis, Brazil
- Ironman Pucón, Araucanía, Chile

=== Africa ===
- Ironman African Championship in Nelson Mandela Bay, South Africa
- Ironman African Championship in Taghit, Algeria

=== Asia ===
- Ironman Gurye in Gurye, South Korea
- Ironman Taiwan in Penghu, Taiwan
- Ironman Malaysia in Langkawi, Malaysia
- Ironman Philippines in Zambales, Philippines
- Ironman Kazakhstan in Astana, Kazakhstan
- Ironman Goa in Goa, India
- Ironman Vietnam in Da Nang, Vietnam
- Ironman Japan in Hakodate, Hokkaido, Japan

=== Oceania ===
- Ironman Australia in Port Macquarie, New South Wales, Australia
- Ironman Asia-Pacific Championship in Cairns, Queensland, Australia
- Ironman Western Australia in Busselton, Australia
- Ironman New Zealand in Taupo, New Zealand

=== Specifications of the Ironman races ===
Town/City	Country	Region	water type	wetsuit rule	# swimming loops	Australian exit	# biking loops	# running loops
Penticton	Canada (BC)	North America	fresh	-	1	no	1	2
Klagenfurt	Austria	Europe	fresh	-	1	no	2	2
Copenhagen	Denmark	Europe	salt	mandatory	1	no	2	4
Bolton	England	Europe	fresh	-	2	yes	3	4
Tallinn	Estonia	Europe	fresh	-	2	yes	2	4
Nice	France	Europe	salt	-	2	no	1	4
Vichy	France	Europe	fresh	generally forbidden	1	yes	2	4
Hamburg	Germany	Europe	fresh	-	1	no	2	4
Frankfurt	Germany	Europe	fresh	-	1	yes	2	4
Emilia Romagna	Italy	Europe	salt	-	1	no	2	4
Maastricht	Netherlands	Europe	fresh	-	1	yes	2	4
Haugesund	Norway	Europe	fresh	-	1	yes	1	4
Gdynia	Poland	Europe	salt	optional	1	yes	2	4
Barcelona	Spain	Europe	salt	-	1	no	2	3
Puerto del Carmen	Spain (Canaries)	Europe	salt	mandatory	2	yes	1	3
Kalmar	Sweden	Europe	brackish	-	1	no	2	3
Zurich	Switzerland	Europe	fresh	-	1	no	1	4
Tenby	Wales	Europe	salt	-	2	yes	2	4
Cork	Ireland	Europe	salt	mandatory	2	yes	2	4
Mont-Tremblant	Canada (Quebec)	North America	fresh	optional	1	no	2	2
Cozumel	Mexico	North America	salt		1	no	3	3
Tempe	USA (Arizona)	North America	fresh		1	no	3	2
Santa Rosa	USA (California)	North America			2	no	2	3
Panama City Beach	USA (Florida)	North America			2	yes	1	2
Kailua-Kona	USA (Hawaii)	North America	salt	no	1	no	1	1
Louisville	USA (Kentucky)	North America			1	no	2	2
Cambridge	USA (Maryland)	North America	brackish		2	no	2	2.5
Lake Placid	USA (New York)	North America	fresh		2	yes	2	2
Chattanooga	USA (Tennessee)	North America	fresh		1	no	2	2.25
The Woodlands	USA (Texas)	North America	fresh		1	no	2	3
Madison	USA (Wisconsin)	North America	fresh		2	no	2	2
Florianópolis	Brazil	South America	salt		2	yes	2	4
Mar del Plata	Argentina	South America	salt	-	2		3	3
Nelson Mandela Bay	South Africa	Africa	salt	-	1	no	2	4
Subic Bay	Philippines	Asia						
Gurye	Korea	Asia						
Penghu	Taiwan	Asia						
Langkawi	Malaysia	Asia	salt					
Port Macquarie	Australia	Oceania	salt	optional	1	no	2	4
Cairns	Australia	Oceania	salt	optional	2	no	2	4
Busselton	Australia	Oceania	salt	optional	2	yes	2	4
Taupo	New Zealand	Oceania	fresh	optional	1	no	2	4

== Notable Ironman triathletes ==
=== Men ===
- Anders Hofman
  - First person to complete the Ironman on Antarctica
- Mark Allen
  - 6-time winner of the Ironman Hawaii (joint men's record)
  - 5 consecutive victories in Hawaii (overall record)
- Jan Frodeno
  - Current record holder for the fastest time for all iron-distance races (7:27:53 at Zwift Tri Battle Royale in 2021 — not a WTC event).
- Tim Don
  - Official WTC-brand world record for fastest Ironman in Brazil 2017 with a time of 7:40:23
- Dave Scott
  - 6-time winner of the Ironman World Championship (joint men's record)
- Scott Tinley, two-time winner, three-time Ironman World Series Champion and most top ten finishes.
- Luc Van Lierde
  - First European male winner of Ironman Hawaii
  - Holder of all-time record until 2011 (7:50:27 in 1996 Ironman Europe)
  - Set the Hawaii course record (8:04:08) in 1996, which held until 2011
- Rick and Dick Hoyt
  - First "Team" to complete in 2 races.
  - Rick, who has cerebral palsy, was pulled by his father with a specially made boat, special seat on Dick's bike and was wheeled across the finish line all by his father.
- Chris Nikic
  - First person to compete and complete with Down syndrome.
  - Competed Panama Ironman in 16 hours 46 minutes and 9 seconds.
  - Awarded the Jimmy V Award for Perseverance.

=== Women ===
- Natascha Badmann
  - First European female winner of Ironman World Championship
  - 6-time winner of the Ironman World Championships
- Mirinda Carfrae
  - Three-time winner of the Ironman World Championship (2010, 2013, 2014)
  - Reached the podium in 6 of 7 attempts at Ironman Hawaii (silver: 2009, 2011,2016; bronze: 2012; DNF: 2015, 2016)
  - Women's record-holder for the overall Kona course (8:52:14, set in 2013) and the run course (2:50:38 in 2014)
- Paula Newby-Fraser
  - 8-time winner of Ironman Hawaii (overall record)
  - 4 consecutive victories in Hawaii
  - 24 Ironman victories overall (overall record)
  - Nicknamed "The Queen of Kona"
- Daniela Ryf
  - Winner of the 2015, 2016, 2017 and 2018 Ironman World Championship
  - Eighth woman to earn more than one Kona title
  - Set a world record of 8:08:21 (Roth, 2023)
  - Fastest female Ironman distance triathlon bike time: 4:26:07 (Kona, 2018)
  - Official WTC-brand Ironman world record (Note: record over all WTC Ironman-branded ("M dot") races only) holder: 8:26:18 (Hawaii, 2018)
- Chrissie Wellington
  - Winner of the Ironman Hawaii World Championship at her first attempt, less than a year after turning professional
  - 3-time successive and 4-time overall female winner of Ironman Hawaii (2007, 2008, 2009 and 2011)
  - Former female Hawaii course record holder: 8:54:02 (2009)
  - Holds the second fastest-ever women's times over the Ironman distance triathlon: 8:18:13.
  - Fastest female Ironman distance triathlon marathon run time: 2:44:35 (Roth, 2011)
  - Greatest number of sub-9 hour times (nine, five more than Paula Newby-Fraser's previous record)
  - Undefeated over the Ironman distance triathlon
  - First winner of the Ironman World Championship from the United Kingdom

== Ironman world records ==
The designation of "world record" is unofficial due to lack of course certification as well as World Triathlon Corporation not maintaining official world record status.

Ironman men's world records
Event	Record	Athlete	Nationality	Competition	Place
Full Ironman	7:19:17 (47:52 - 3:51:16 - 2:33:31)	Magnus Ditlev	Denmark	Ironman Florida 2026	Panama City Beach, Florida, USA
Swim (3.9 km)	41:26	Christof Wandratsch	Germany	Ironman Austria 2006	Klagenfurt, Austria
Swim (3.9 km; current-aided)	39:08	Luke Bell	Australia	Ironman New York 2012	New York, United States
Bike (180 km)	3:51:16	Magnus Ditlev	Denmark	Ironman Florida 2026	Panama City Beach, Florida, USA
Run (42.2 km)	2:26:50	Manoel Messias	Brazil	Ironman Brazil 2025	Florianopolis, Brazil

Ironman women's records
Event	Record	Athlete	Nationality	Competition	Place
Full Ironman	8:02:38	Anne Haug	Germany	Challenge Roth 2024	Roth, Germany
Swim (3.862 km)	45:04	Amanda Stevens	United States	Ironman Germany 2012	Frankfurt, Germany
Swim (3.862 km; current-aided)	40:29	Dede Griesbauer	United States	Ironman New York 2012	New York, United States
Bike (180.246 km)	4:22:56	Daniela Ryf	Switzerland	Challenge Roth 2023	Roth, Germany
Run (42.195 km)	2:38:27	Laura Philipp	Germany	Hamburg 2025	Hamburg, Germany

== Ironman Pro Series ==
On top of the Ironman World Championship, the Ironman Pro Series was launched in 2024. The Pro Series is a year long competition aimed at professional triathletes only. Participants collect points throughout a year and compete for the Pro Series champion title and a prize pool of US$1.7 million.

=== Competition format ===
Only 17 out of the 41 full-distance Ironman races world-wide are part of the Pro Series in 2026. Athletes can compete and collect points in any of them. However, only their top five race results will be used in final rankings.

== Ironman 70.3 ==
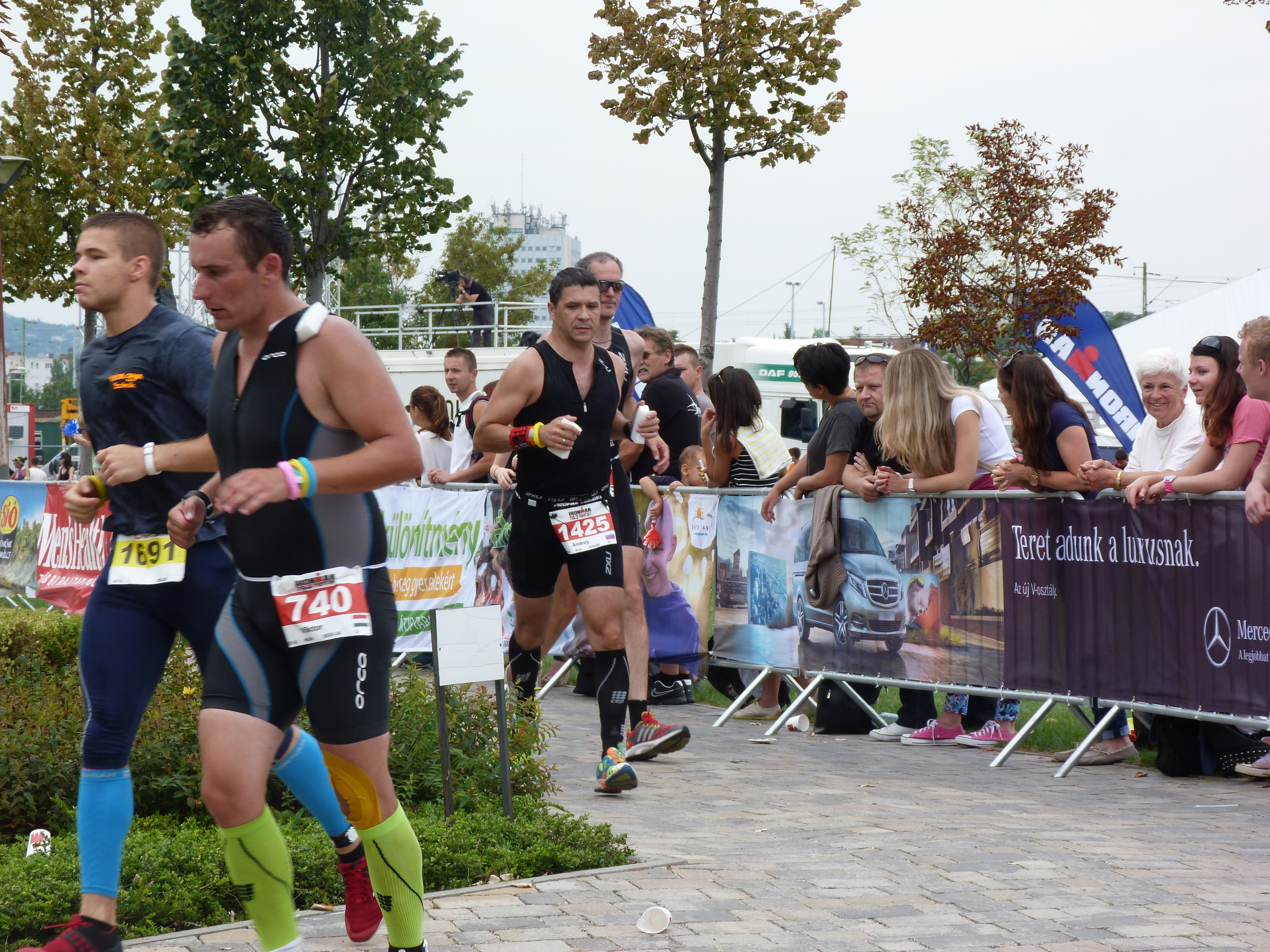
Ironman 70.3 Budapest - 2014

In 2005, WTC instituted the Ironman 70.3 race series. This shorter course, also known as a Half Ironman, consists of a 1.2-mile (1.9 km) swim, 56-mile (90 km) bike ride, and 13.1-mile (21.1 km) run. As with the Ironman series, it consists of a number of qualifying races at various locations worldwide ending in a world championship race with athletes drawn largely from top finishers in the qualifying events.

For amateur athletes, some 70.3 events acted as qualifiers for the full Ironman World Championships in Hawaii. However, the 2015 qualifying year marked a large de-emphasis on using certain Ironman 70.3 series races as a path for amateur athletes to qualify for the Ironman World Championships. The change was made to accommodate for the increased number of qualifying slots created from the full Ironman events which had been recently added.

For professional triathletes, up to three 70.3 events can be used to accumulate points to be put towards their championship qualifying point rankings.

== Ownership and trademark ==
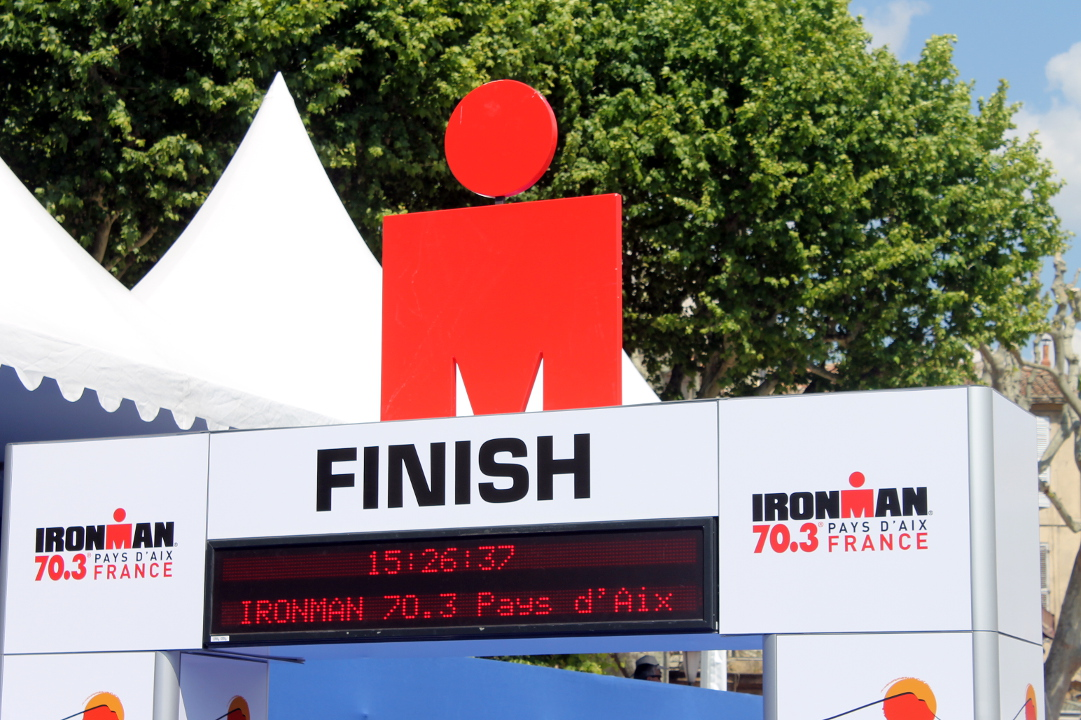
The M dot symbol at an Ironman 70.3 event in the south of France.

Advance Publications, the parent company that owns WTC and subsequently the Ironman brand, pays royalties to Marvel Entertainment for use of the Ironman brand. As part of the licensing agreement both Marvel and the former owner Wanda agreed to not use the "Iron Man" and "Ironman" trademarks in ways that would suggest an association with the other or cause brand confusion. World Triathlon Corporation CEO Andrew Messick has stated that the agreement has been in place for decades and the royalties paid are "not material to the business." Iron Man first appeared in 1963, whereas the first Ironman triathlon was raced in 1978.

The Ironman Triathlon logo is a trademark of the World Triathlon Corporation. The WTC has also registered the trademarks for "Ironman," "Ironman Triathlon," "M dot," and "70.3." WTC has licensed the Ironman name for use, such as in the line of Timex Ironman wristwatches.

== See also ==
- CrossFit Games
- Ultra-triathlon
- XTERRA Triathlon
