= Julie Moss =

American triathlete

Medal record

Women's triathlon

Representing United States

Ironman World Championship
Silver medal – second place	1982 (Feb)	Individual

Julie Moss (born 1958) is an American triathlete. She first became known during the 1982 Ironman Triathlon, in which she competed as part of her research for her exercise physiology thesis. She has stated that she did not initially take the race seriously and did not have any special training beforehand. Nevertheless, she found herself with a comfortable lead, but approximately two miles before the finish line, she became severely dehydrated. She staggered and crawled towards the end of the course, only to be passed moments before the finish line by competitor Kathleen McCartney. Her struggle to finish the Ironman was broadcast around the world, and inspired many others to compete in Ironman events.

She later married fellow triathlete Mark Allen.

The dramatic race between Julie Moss and Kathleen McCartney in the 1982 Ironman Triathlon significantly heightened the visibility and popularity of the sport, contributing to its inclusion as an Olympic event in 2000, and remains a poignant moment in triathlon history.

The October 8, 2009 episode of The Score by Diana Nyad describes Moss's Ironman race.

The April 16, 2010 episode of WNYC's Radio Lab released a podcast on Limits that includes a direct interview with Moss about her Ironman experience in the Limits of the Body section.
