= Kathleen McCartney (triathlete) =

American triathlete

Medal record

Women's triathlon

Representing United States

Ironman World Championship
| Gold medal – first place | 1982 (Feb) | Individual |

Kathleen McCartney is an American triathlete who won the Ironman World Championship in February 1982. She passed Julie Moss, who collapsed less than 10 yards from the finish line, and won the race. The New York Times credited the race with "raising the levels of enthusiasm and participation for the sport".

== Results ==
| Date | Position | Event | Swim time | Bike time | Run time | transition time | Total time |
|---|---|---|---|---|---|---|---|
| February 6, 1982 | 1st | Ironman World Championship | 1:32:00 | 5:51:12 | 3:46:28 | | 11:09:40 |
| October 9, 1982 | 4th | Ironman World Championship | 1:14:05 | 5:51:43 | 4:05:05 | | 11:10:53 |
| October 22, 1983 | 15th | Ironman World Championship | 1:09:31.8 | 6:10:53.1 | 4:14:16.7 | | 11:34:40.8 |

== Personal life ==
McCartney has three children. She divorced in 2010 after 25 years of marriage. Her daughter, Madeline, earned a rowing scholarship at the University of California, Berkeley. McCartney’s nephew Kevin Love is a basketball player in the National Basketball Association (NBA).
