= Europe Triathlon Championships =

International sporting event

- Status: active
- Genre: sporting event
- Date: mid-year
- Frequency: Annual
- Country: varying
- Inaugurated: 1985
- Founder: European Triathlon Union

The Europe Triathlon Championships, previously officially named the ETU Triathlon European Championships and colloquially referred to as the European Triathlon Championships are the main triathlon championships in Europe organised by Europe Triathlon. Conducted in most years over the 'standard' or 'Olympic' triathlon distance of a 1500m swim, a 40 km bike and 10 km run, the event, which predates both World Triathlon and the official World Championships, has been run since 1985.

== History ==
Unlike the world title which moved in the 2009 season to a season long 'series' format, the European championship has remained a single one-off championship race throughout its history.

From the 2018 edition in Glasgow, every four years the standard distance championships were to be part of the European Championships multi-sport event. When the 2026 multi sport championships did not take place, the triathlon portion reverted to a stand alone event.

The record for most wins in the men's event is four, shared by the Dutchman Rob Barel, who won the first four editions, and Briton Alistair Brownlee and the Spaniard Javier Gómez Noya. Nicola Spirig from Switzerland holds the outright record of six wins in the women's event.

The Europe Triathlon Sprint Championships over a 750m swim, 20 kilometre bike and 5 kilometre run, have been held separately every year since 2016, and sporadically before that, and have also adopted the Europe Triathlon Championships name since 2022. In addition, Triathlon has been a European Games event since 2015, but is not regarded as the continental championships.

== Editions ==
| # | Year | City | Country | Date |
|---|---|---|---|---|
| 1 | 1985 | Immenstadt | West Germany | 23 June |
| 2 | 1986 | Milton Keynes | United Kingdom | 22 June |
| 3 | 1987 | Marseille | France | 31 May |
| 4 | 1988 | Venice | Italy | 20 June |
| 5 | 1989 | Cascais | Portugal | 11 June |
| 6 | 1990 | Linz | Austria | 26 August |
| 7 | 1991 | Geneva | Switzerland | 8 September |
| 8 | 1992 | Lommel | Belgium | 5 July |
| 9 | 1993 | Echternach | Luxembourg | 4 July |
| 10 | 1994 | Eichstätt | Germany | 2 July |
| 11 | 1995 | Stockholm | Sweden | 28–29 July |
| 12 | 1996 | Szombathely | Hungary | 7 July |
| 13 | 1997 | Vuokatti | Finland | 5 July |
| 14 | 1998 | Velden am Wörther See | Austria | 4 July |
| 15 | 1999 | Funchal | Portugal | 4 July |
| 16 | 2000 | Stein | Netherlands | 8 July |
| 17 | 2001 | Karlovy Vary | Czech Republic | 23 June |
| 18 | 2002 | Győr | Hungary | 6 July |
| 19 | 2003 | Karlovy Vary | Czech Republic | 21 June |
| 20 | 2004 | Valencia | Spain | 18 April |
| 21 | 2005 | Lausanne | Switzerland | 20 August |
| 22 | 2006 | Autun | France | 23–25 June |
| 23 | 2007 | Copenhagen | Denmark | 29 June–1 July |
| 24 | 2008 | Lisbon | Portugal | 10–11 May |
| 25 | 2009 | Holten | Netherlands | 2–5 July |
| 26 | 2010 | Athlone | Ireland | 3–4 July |
| 27 | 2011 | Pontevedra | Spain | 24–26 June |
| 28 | 2012 | Eilat | Israel | 20–22 April |
| 29 | 2013 | Alanya | Turkey | 14–16 June |
| 30 | 2014 | Kitzbühel | Austria | 20–21 June |
| 31 | 2015 | Geneva | Switzerland | 11–12 July |
| 32 | 2016 | Lisbon | Portugal | 28 May |
| 33 | 2017 | Kitzbühel | Austria | 16–18 June |
| 34 | 2018 (Note: Part of the 2018 European Championships) | Glasgow | United Kingdom | 9–11 August |
| 35 | 2019 | Weert | Netherlands | 30 May–2 June |
| 36 | 2020 | Tartu | Estonia | 28–30 August (Note: Cancelled due to the COVID-19 pandemic.) |
| 37 | 2021 | Valencia | Spain | 25 September |
| 38 | 2022 (Note: Part of the 2022 European Championships) | Munich | Germany | 12–14 August |
| 39 | 2023 | Madrid | Spain | 4 June |
| 40 | 2024 | Vichy | France | 21–22 September |
| 41 | 2025 | Istanbul | Turkey | 30–31 August |
| 42 | 2026 | Tarragona | Spain | 13-14 June |

== Men's medalists ==
| Year | Gold | Silver | Bronze |
|---|---|---|---|
| 1985 | Robert Barel (NED) | Klaus Klären (FRG) | Jörg Hoffmann (FRG) |
| 1986 | Robert Barel (NED) | Jürgen Zäck (FRG) | Jörg Hoffmann (FRG) |
| 1987 | Robert Barel (NED) | Philippe Méthion (FRA) | Karel Blondeel (BEL) |
| 1988 | Robert Barel (NED) | Didier Volckaert (BEL) | Jochen Basting (FRG) |
| 1989 | Yves Cordier (FRA) | Robert Barel (NED) | Jürgen Zäck (FRG) |
| 1990 | Fons Hamblock (BEL) | Robert Barel (NED) | Wolfgang Kattnig (AUT) |
| 1991 | Simon Lessing (GBR) | Robert Barel (NED) | Rémy Rampteau (FRA) |
| 1992 | Spencer Smith (GBR) | Simon Lessing (GBR) | Glenn Cook (GBR) |
| 1993 | Simon Lessing (GBR) | Thomas Hellriegel (GER) | Rainer Müller-Hörner (GER) |
| 1994 | Simon Lessing (GBR) | Ralf Eggert (GER) | Rainer Müller-Hörner (GER) |
| 1995 | Rainer Müller-Hörner (GER) | Luc Van Lierde (BEL) | Spencer Smith (GBR) |
| 1996 | Luc Van Lierde (BEL) | Dennis Looze (NED) | Ralf Eggert (GER) |
| 1997 | Spencer Smith (GBR) | Stephan Vuckovic (GER) | José Miguel Barbany (ESP) |
| 1998 | Andrew Johns (GBR) | Jean-Christophe Guinchard (SUI) | Volodymyr Polikarpenko (UKR) |
| 1999 | Reto Hug (SUI) | Jan Řehula (CZE) | Martin Krňávek (CZE) |
| 2000 | Andrew Johns (GBR) | Reto Hug (SUI) | Eric van der Linden (NED) |
| 2001 | Filip Ospalý (CZE) | Iván Raña (ESP) | Eric van der Linden (NED) |
| 2002 | Iván Raña (ESP) | Filip Ospalý (CZE) | Maik Petzold (GER) |
| 2003 | Iván Raña (ESP) | Filip Ospalý (CZE) | Martin Krňávek (CZE) |
| 2004 | Rasmus Henning (DEN) | Eneko Llanos (ESP) | Daniel Unger (GER) |
| 2005 | Frédéric Belaubre (FRA) | Cédric Fleureton (FRA) | Sven Riederer (SUI) |
| 2006 | Frédéric Belaubre (FRA) | Cédric Fleureton (FRA) | Andrew Johns (GBR) |
| 2007 | Javier Gómez Noya (ESP) | Jan Frodeno (GER) | Daniel Unger (GER) |
| 2008 | Frédéric Belaubre (FRA) | Tony Moulai (FRA) | Olivier Marceau (SUI) |
| 2009 | Javier Gómez Noya (ESP) | Alistair Brownlee (GBR) | Alexander Bryukhankov (RUS) |
| 2010 | Alistair Brownlee (GBR) | Javier Gómez Noya (ESP) | David Hauss (FRA) |
| 2011 | Alistair Brownlee (GBR) | Jonathan Brownlee (GBR) | Dmitry Polyanski (RUS) |
| 2012 | Javier Gómez Noya (ESP) | Alexander Bryukhankov (RUS) | Ivan Vasiliev (RUS) |
| 2013 | Ivan Vasiliev (RUS) | Alessandro Fabian (ITA) | Mario Mola (ESP) |
| 2014 | Alistair Brownlee (GBR) | Dmitry Polyanski (RUS) | Vicente Hernández (ESP) |
| 2015 | David Hauss (FRA) | Sven Riederer (SUI) | Kristian Blummenfelt (NOR) |
| 2016 | Javier Gómez Noya (ESP) | Dmitry Polyanski (RUS) | Andrea Salvisberg (SUI) |
| 2017 | João Pereira (POR) | Raphaël Montoya (FRA) | João Silva (POR) |
| 2018 | Pierre Le Corre (FRA) | Fernando Alarza (ESP) | Marten Van Riel (BEL) |
| 2019 | Alistair Brownlee (GBR) | João Pereira (POR) | Jelle Geens (BEL) |
| 2021 | Dorian Coninx (FRA) | Roberto Sánchez Mantecón (ESP) | Antonio Serrat (ESP) |
| 2022 | Léo Bergère (FRA) | Pierre Le Corre (FRA) | Dorian Coninx (FRA) |
| 2023 | David Castro (ESP) | Jonathan Brownlee (GBR) | Adrien Briffod (SUI) |
| 2024 | Csongor Lehmann (HUN) | Yanis Seguin (FRA) | Casper Stornes (NOR) |
| 2025 | Max Studer (SUI) | Bence Bicsák (HUN) | Panagiotis Bitados (GRE) |
| 2026 | Oliver Conway (GBR) | Michael Gar (GBR) | Roberto Sánchez Mantecón (ESP) |

=== Medals in Men's Triathlon ===
| Rank | Nation | Gold | Silver | Bronze | Total |
|---|---|---|---|---|---|
| 1 | Great Britain | 12 | 5 | 3 | 20 |
| 2 | France | 8 | 7 | 3 | 18 |
| 3 | Spain | 7 | 5 | 5 | 17 |
| 4 | Netherlands | 4 | 4 | 2 | 10 |
| 5 | Switzerland | 2 | 3 | 4 | 9 |
| 6 | Belgium | 2 | 2 | 3 | 7 |
| 7 | Germany | 1 | 6 | 10 | 17 |
| 8 | Russia | 1 | 3 | 3 | 7 |
| 9 | Czech Republic | 1 | 3 | 2 | 6 |
| 10 | Portugal | 1 | 1 | 1 | 3 |
| 11 | Hungary | 1 | 1 | 0 | 2 |
| 12 | Denmark | 1 | 0 | 0 | 1 |
| 13 | Italy | 0 | 1 | 0 | 1 |
| 14 | Norway | 0 | 0 | 2 | 2 |
| 15 | Austria | 0 | 0 | 1 | 1 |
| 15 | Greece | 0 | 0 | 1 | 1 |
| 15 | Ukraine | 0 | 0 | 1 | 1 |
| Totals (17 entries) | | 41 | 41 | 41 | 123 |

== Women's medalist ==
| Year | Gold | Silver | Bronze |
|---|---|---|---|
| 1985 | Alexandra Kremer (FRG) | Anna-Lena Fritzon (SWE) | Sarah Coope (GBR) |
| 1986 | Lieve Paulus (BEL) | Sarah Springman (GBR) | Sarah Coope (GBR) |
| 1987 | Sarah Coope (GBR) | Sarah Springman (GBR) | Chantal Malherbe (FRA) |
| 1988 | Sarah Springman (GBR) | Dolorita Gerber (SUI) | Pernille Svarre (DEN) |
| 1989 | Simone Mortier (FRG) | Kirsten Ullrich (FRG) | Sarah Springman (GBR) |
| 1990 | Thea Sijbesma (NED) | Simone Mortier (FRG) | Isabelle Mouthon-Michellys (FRA) |
| 1991 | Isabelle Mouthon-Michellys (FRA) | Simone Mortier (GER) | Sonja Krolik (GER) |
| 1992 | Sonja Krolik (GER) | Lone Larsen (DEN) | Ute Schäfer (GER) |
| 1993 | Simone Westhoff (GER) | Simone Mortier (GER) | Lydie Reuze (FRA) |
| 1994 | Sonja Krolik (GER) | Simone Westhoff (GER) | Isabelle Mouthon-Michellys (FRA) |
| 1995 | Isabelle Mouthon-Michellys (FRA) | Natascha Badmann (SUI) | Suzanne Nielsen (DEN) |
| 1996 | Suzanne Nielsen (DEN) | Mieke Suys (BEL) | Sophie Delemer (FRA) |
| 1997 | Natascha Badmann (SUI) | Virginia Berasategui (ESP) | Suzanne Nielsen (DEN) |
| 1998 | Wieke Hoogzaad (NED) | Ingrid van Lubek (NED) | Stephanie Forrester (GBR) |
| 1999 | Anja Dittmer (GER) | Magali Messmer (SUI) | Sian Brice (GBR) |
| 2000 | Kathleen Smet (BEL) | Magali Messmer (SUI) | Julie Dibens (GBR) |
| 2001 | Michelle Dillon (GBR) | Kathleen Smet (BEL) | Analeah Emmerson (GBR) |
| 2002 | Kathleen Smet (BEL) | Leanda Cave (GBR) | Christiane Pilz (GER) |
| 2003 | Ana Burgos (ESP) | Nadia Cortassa (ITA) | Kathleen Smet (BEL) |
| 2004 | Vanessa Fernandes (POR) | Kate Allen (AUT) | Pilar Hidalgo (ESP) |
| 2005 | Vanessa Fernandes (POR) | Ana Burgos (ESP) | Nadia Cortassa (ITA) |
| 2006 | Vanessa Fernandes (POR) | Anja Dittmer (GER) | Nadia Cortassa (ITA) |
| 2007 | Vanessa Fernandes (POR) | Kate Allen (AUT) | Nicola Spirig (SUI) |
| 2008 | Vanessa Fernandes (POR) | Nadia Cortassa (ITA) | Lisa Nordén (SWE) |
| 2009 | Nicola Spirig (SUI) | Liz May (LUX) | Vanessa Fernandes (POR) |
| 2010 | Nicola Spirig (SUI) | Carole Péon (FRA) | Lisa Nordén (SWE) |
| 2011 | Emmie Charayron (FRA) | Vendula Frintová (CZE) | Annamaria Mazzetti (ITA) |
| 2012 | Nicola Spirig (SUI) | Ainhoa Murúa (ESP) | Emmie Charayron (FRA) |
| 2013 | Rachel Klamer (NED) | Vicky Holland (GBR) | Vendula Frintová (CZE) |
| 2014 | Nicola Spirig (SUI) | Sophia Saller (GER) | Annamaria Mazzetti (ITA) |
| 2015 | Nicola Spirig (SUI) | Annamaria Mazzetti (ITA) | Ainhoa Murúa (ESP) |
| 2016 | India Lee (GBR) | Yuliya Yelistratova (UKR) | Zsófia Kovács (HUN) |
| 2017 | Jessica Learmonth (GBR) | Sophie Coldwell (GBR) | Alice Betto (ITA) |
| 2018 | Nicola Spirig (SUI) | Jessica Learmonth (GBR) | Cassandre Beaugrand (FRA) |
| 2019 | Beth Potter (GBR) | Sandra Dodet (FRA) | Claire Michel (BEL) |
| 2021 | Julie Derron (SUI) | Annika Koch (GER) | Sian Rainsley (GBR) |
| 2022 | Non Stanford (GBR) | Laura Lindemann (GER) | Emma Lombardi (FRA) |
| 2023 | Jeanne Lehair (LUX) | Lisa Tertsch (GER) | Cathia Schär (SUI) |
| 2024 | Vicky Holland (GBR) | Léonie Périault (FRA) | Alice Betto (ITA) |
| 2025 | Jolien Vermeylen (BEL) | Diana Isakova (AIN) | Tilly Anema (GBR) |
| 2026 | Lisa Tertsch (GER) | Jolien Vermeylen (BEL) | Valentina Riasova (AIN) |

=== Medals in Women's Triathlon ===
| Rank | Nation | Gold | Silver | Bronze | Total |
|---|---|---|---|---|---|
| 1 | Great Britain | 8 | 6 | 9 | 23 |
| 2 | Switzerland | 8 | 4 | 2 | 14 |
| 3 | Germany | 7 | 10 | 3 | 20 |
| 4 | Portugal | 5 | 0 | 1 | 6 |
| 5 | Belgium | 4 | 3 | 2 | 9 |
| 6 | France | 3 | 3 | 8 | 14 |
| 7 | Netherlands | 3 | 1 | 0 | 4 |
| 8 | Spain | 1 | 3 | 2 | 6 |
| 9 | Denmark | 1 | 1 | 3 | 5 |
| 10 | Luxembourg | 1 | 1 | 0 | 2 |
| 11 | Italy | 0 | 3 | 6 | 9 |
| 12 | Austria | 0 | 2 | 0 | 2 |
| 13 | Sweden | 0 | 1 | 2 | 3 |
| 14 | Czech Republic | 0 | 1 | 1 | 2 |
| – | Individual Neutral Athletes | 0 | 1 | 1 | 2 |
| 15 | Ukraine | 0 | 1 | 0 | 1 |
| 16 | Hungary | 0 | 0 | 1 | 1 |
| Totals (16 entries) | | 41 | 41 | 41 | 123 |

== Types ==
All events in seniors, U23, juniors and 15 age groups (15–90 years old) and para (6 class).

1. Europe Triathlon Cross Championships
2. Europe Triathlon Cross Duathlon Championships
3. Europe Triathlon Sprint Championships (Sprint and Team Relay)
4. Europe Triathlon Middle Distance Triathlon Championships
5. Europe Triathlon Long Distance Triathlon Championships
6. Europe Triathlon Aquabike Championships
7. Europe Triathlon Aquathlon Championships
8. Europe Triathlon Duathlon Championships
9. Europe Winter Triathlon Championships
10. Europe Triathlon Powerman Middle Distance Duathlon Championships
11. Multi Championship: Duathlon Sprint, Duathlon Standard, Cross Duathlon, Cross Triathlon, Aquathlon, Middle Distance Triathlon, Middle Distance Aquabike

== Results ==
- Events
- Results
- Results
- The history of the European Championships
- Triathlon - European Duathlon Championships - 2024 Men
- Triathlon - European Cross Duathlon Championships - 2024 - Detailed results
- Triathlon - European Cross Triathlon Championships - 2024 - Detailed results
- Triathlon - European Championships - 2024 - middle distance results
- Triathlon - European Championships Long Distance - 2024 - Detailed results
- Triathlon - European Aquathlon Championships - 2024 - Detailed results
- Triathlon - Sprint Triathlon European Championships - 2021
- Triathlon - European U-23 Championships - 2020
- Triathlon Duathlon 63 G Medals
- Triathlon Aquathlon 48 G Medals
- Cross Triathlon 44 G Medals
- Cross Duathlon 44 G Medals
- Powerman Middle Distance Triathlon 25 G Medals
- Europe Triathlon Youth Championships Festival 2024 Venue Update
- Results: 2023 Europe Triathlon Sprint & Relay Championships Balikesir
- 2024 Six European Championship Results +200 Gold Medals in 8 Days
- Results: 2024 Europe Triathlon Junior Cup Izvorani
- Results: 2024 World Triathlon Para Cup Besancon

== See also ==
- European Triathlon Union
- Europe Triathlon Sprint Championships
- World Triathlon Series
- European Modern Pentathlon Championships
- Association of Surfing Professionals Europe
