= 1992 European Triathlon Championships =

1992 edition of the European Triathlon Championships

- Venue: Lommel, Belgium
- Dates: 5 July 1992

The 1992 European Triathlon Championships was the 8th edition of the European Triathlon Championships, held in Lommel, Belgium, on 5 July 1992.

== Summary ==
The competition was organised by European Triathlon Union (ETU) over the standard Olympic triathlon distance of a 1,500 m (1,600 yd) swim, a 40 km (25 mi) cycle, and a 10 km (6.2 mi) run.

Team medals were award to both men and women, with placings decided by aggregating the cumulative times of the first three finishers in each race.

== Race summary ==
In the individual men's race, Great Britain's reigning European youth champion Spencer Smith led from the start, exiting the water first and holding off defending champion Simon Lessing on the bike and run to win gold in 1:48:37, with fellow Briton Glenn Cooke. By sweeping the individual podium, Great Britain built an impregnable lead in the team event for the reigning men's team champions.

In the women's race, Denmark's Lone Larsen set the early pace out of the swim and maintained a narrow advantage through the bike leg. On the final run, however, Germany's Sonja Krolik surged past the field with the fastest split of the day to claim gold in 2:02:47. Germany comfortably took the women's team title.

The championships marked the end of an era, and Rob Barel's seven year run of podium finishes in the men's individual event as the legendary dutchman, with four gold and three silver medals in consecutive championships, could only finish in fifteenth.

== Medal summary ==
Event	Gold		Silver		Bronze	
Men's individual	Spencer Smith; Great Britain	1:48:37	Simon Lessing; Great Britain	1:49:05	Glenn Cook; Great Britain	1:49:15
Women's individual	Sonja Krolik; Germany	2:02:47	Lone Larsen; Denmark	2:03:43	Ute Schäfer; Germany	2:04:08
Men's team	Great Britain; Spencer Smith; Simon Lessing; Glenn Cook	5:26:57	Germany; Rainer Müller-Hörner; Thomas Hellriegel; Ralf Eggert	5:30:39	Belgium; Luc Van Lierde; Danny Simons; Eric Ronsmans	5:32.15
Women's team	Germany; Sonja Krolik; Ute Schäfer; Franziska Lilienfein	6:13:10	Denmark; Lone Larsen; Anette Pedersen; Suzanne Nielsen	6:14:56	France; Isabelle Mouthon-Michellys; Sophie Delemer; Cédrine Soulet	6:21:33

== Medal table ==
* Host nation (Belgium)

Rank	Nation	Gold	Silver	Bronze	Total
1	Germany	2	1	1	4
1	Great Britain	2	1	1	4
3	Denmark	0	2	0	2
4	Belgium*	0	0	1	1
4	France	0	0	1	1
Totals (5 entries)		4	4	4	12

== Results ==
=== Men ===
Rank	Athlete	Nation	Swim	Bike	Run	Overall time
1st place, gold medalist(s)	Spencer Smith	Great Britain	19:07	56:53	32:37	1:48:37
2nd place, silver medalist(s)	Simon Lessing	Great Britain	19:21	57:14	32:27	1:49:05
3rd place, bronze medalist(s)	Glenn Cook	Great Britain	20:53	55:25	32:55	1:49:15
4	Rémy Rampteau	France	21:11	—	—	1:49:36
5	Rainer Müller-Hörner	Germany	20:52	55:40	33:17	1:49:50
6	Thomas Hellriegel	Germany	20:57	55:12	33:52	1:50:02
7	Luc Van Lierde	Belgium	20:20	56:20	33:33	1:50:15
8	Ralf Eggert	Germany	20:31	55:59	34:16	1:50:47
9	Holger Lorenz	Germany	21:06	55:34	34:11	1:50:51
10	Danny Simons	Belgium	21:11	55:29	34:16	1:50:57
11	Eric Ronsmans	Belgium	20:58	55:45	34:19	1:51:03
12	Didier Volckaert	Belgium	21:22	55:13	34:40	1:51:17
13	Eric Lacaze	France	21:01	—	—	1:51:43
14	Philippe Méthion	France	21:17	55:10	35:32	1:52:00
15	Rob Barel	Netherlands	21:00	56:16	34:58	1:52:16
16	Péter Kropkó	Hungary	20:36	59:27	32:40	1:52:44
17	Wolfgang Kattnig	Austria	21:10	58:29	33:16	1:52:56
18	Matthew Bellfield	Great Britain	20:57	55:38	36:27	1:53:04
19	Oliver Graf	Germany	21:13	58:33	33:41	1:53:28
20	Roland Knoll	Germany	20:19	59:35	33:54	1:53:49
21	Michal Adamec	Czech Republic	19:19	57:18	37:16	1:53:52
22	Gerald Will	Austria	21:04	55:38	37:15	1:53:58
23	Eimert Venderbosch	Netherlands	21:25	58:37	34:04	1:54:07

=== Women ===
Rank	Athlete	Nation	Swim	Bike	Run	Overall time
1st place, gold medalist(s)	Sonja Krolik	Germany	24:09	1:01:53	36:42	2:02:47
2nd place, silver medalist(s)	Lone Larsen	Denmark	22:07	1:01:49	39:46	2:03:43
3rd place, bronze medalist(s)	Ute Schäfer	Germany	23:19	1:01:16	39:32	2:04:08
4	Catherine Davies	Spain	23:28	1:03:10	37:59	2:04:38
5	Isabelle Mouthon-Michellys	France	22:16	1:03:52	38:39	2:04:47
6	Anette Pedersen	Denmark	22:48	1:02:56	39:22	2:05:06
7	Jeannine De Ruysscher	Belgium	22:18	1:03:31	40:03	2:05:55
8	Suzanne Nielsen	Denmark	22:17	1:03:13	40:34	2:06:07
9	Franziska Lilienfein	Germany	22:22	1:03:24	40:29	2:06:15
10	Sophie Delemer	France	23:15	1:03:02	41:48	2:08:06
11	Simone Mortier	Germany	22:25	1:04:34	41:25	2:08:26
12	Anna Frithioff	Sweden	26:48	1:03:34	38:10	2:08:32
13	Cédrine Soulet	France	22:30	1:04:22	41:46	2:08:40
14	Brigitte Scheithauer	Germany	22:55	1:05:30	40:43	2:09:09
15	Mieke Suys	Belgium	23:10	1:06:39	39:54	2:09:45
16	Chantal Duck	Belgium	20:03	1:08:14	41:42	2:10:02
17	Katinka Wiltenburg	Netherlands	26:02	1:06:18	37:50	2:10:11
18	Sylvie Muguet	France	22:29	1:05:32	42:09	2:10:12
19	Béatrice Mouthon	France	22:11	1:06:57	41:14	2:10:22
20	Jacqueline Sommer	Switzerland	23:21	1:06:09	41:13	2:10:44
21	Jitske Cats	Netherlands	27:10	1:05:53	37:48	2:10:52
22	Franziska Rüssli	Switzerland	23:07	1:04:36	43:28	2:11:12
23	Mirella Gandellini	Italy	26:04	1:06:38	38:49	2:11:32
24	Jacqui Shand	Great Britain	24:06	1:06:03	41:38	2:11:49
25	Anne-Marie Rouchon	France	25:40	1:05:31	42:00	2:13:12
26	Natascha Badmann	Switzerland	29:15	1:05:49	38:20	2:13:25
27	Jasmine Hämmerle	Austria	28:20	1:05:51	39:21	2:13:31
28	Jacqueline van Vliet	Netherlands	26:18	1:07:01	40:38	2:13:56
29	Zsófia Perczel	Hungary	22:22	1:09:35	42:03	2:14:02
30	Judit Baranyai	Hungary	23:20	1:08:40	42:31	2:14:33

=== Men's team ===
The Men's team standings were calculated by aggregating the times of the first three finishers for each federation.

Rank	Nation	Athletes	Combined time
1st place, gold medalist(s)	Great Britain	Spencer Smith; Simon Lessing; Glenn Cook	5:25:57
2nd place, silver medalist(s)	Germany	Rainer Müller-Hörner; Thomas Hellriegel; Ralf Eggert	5:30:39
3rd place, bronze medalist(s)	Belgium	Luc Van Lierde; Danny Simons; Eric Ronsmans	5:32:15
4	France	Rémy Rampteau; Eric Lacaze; Philippe Méthion	5:32:15
5	Netherlands	Rob Barel; Eimert Venderbosch; Mr. De Bruyn	5:41:35

=== Women's team ===
The Men's team standings were calculated by aggregating the times of the first three finishers for each federation..

Rank	Nation	Athletes	Combined time
1st place, gold medalist(s)	Germany	Sonja Krolik; Ute Schäfer; Franziska Lilienfein	6:13:10
2nd place, silver medalist(s)	Denmark	Lone Larsen; Anette Pedersen; Suzanne Nielsen	6:14:56
3rd place, bronze medalist(s)	France	Isabelle Mouthon-Michellys; Sophie Delemer; Cédrine Soulet	6:21:33
4	Belgium	Jeannine De Ruysscher; Mieke Suys; Chantal Duck	6:25:42
5	Netherlands	Katinka Wiltenburg; Jitske Cats; Linda van Vliet	6:34:59

== 1992 European Youth and Junior Triathlon Championships ==
The 1992 ETU Triathlon Youth and Junior European Championships were held in Stein, Netrherland, on 18 July 1992. The competition served as the continental championship for European youth and junior triathletes, as it had for several years. The event featured eight medal programs across men's and women's divisions, comprising individual and team races in both the youth and junior categories, with team positions decided on aggregate times.

=== Medal summary ===
Event	Gold		Silver		Bronze	
Men junior	Olivier Marceau; Switzerland	1:58:46	Roland Melis; Hungary	1:58:47	Normann Stadler; Germany	1:58:52
Women junior	Sonja Krolik; Germany	2:05:58	Sabine Stelter; Germany	2:15:16	Adél Molnár; Hungary	2:15:23
Men youth	Thomas Augenstein; Germany	1:02:30	Ralph Zeetsen; Netherlands	1:02:43	Ralf Courage; Netherlands	1:03:08
Women, youth	Andrea Walkó; Hungary	1:07:33	Vera Maros; Hungary	1:08:16	Petra Harangi; Hungary	1:08:16
Junior men team	Hungary (HUN); Roland Melis; Ivo Spronkmans; Mr. Popel		Germany (GER); Normann Stadler; Christian Waller; Joachim Weinbrenner		Great Britain (GBR); Richard Allen; Ian Hamilton; Loren Snelson	
Junior women team	Germany (GER); Sonja Krolik; Sabine Stelter; Tina Weisser		Hungary (HUN); Adél Molnár; Györgyi Straubinger; Zita Szabó		France (FRA); Nathalie Daumas; Magali Robin; Sophie Tanidi	
Youth men team	Germany (GER); Thomas Augenstein; Dirk Bockel; Mr. Mertens		Netherlands (NED); Ralph Zeetsen; Ralf Courage; Mr. Cornelissen		Hungary (HUN); László Völgyi; Gergely Képes; András Héczey	
Youth women team	Hungary (HUN); Andrea Walkó; Vera Maros; Petra Harangi		Germany (GER); Beatrice Waller; Simone Zdrojewski; Nina Fischer		Netherlands (NED); Monique Van T Hullenaar; Sheila Bruist; Wilma Van T Hullenaar	

=== Medal table ===
* Host nation (Netherlands)

Rank	Nation	Gold	Silver	Bronze	Total
1	Germany (GER)	4	3	1	8
2	Hungary (HUN)	3	3	3	9
3	Switzerland (SUI)	1	0	0	1
4	Netherlands (NED)*	0	2	2	4
5	France (FRA)	0	0	1	1
5	Great Britain (GBR)	0	0	1	1
Totals (6 entries)		8	8	8	24
