= 1995 European Triathlon Championships =

1995 edition of the European Triathlon Championships

- Venue: Stockholm, Sweden
- Dates: 28–29 July 1995

Champions
- Men: Rainer Müller-Hörner (GER); Ralph Zeetsen (NED) (junior)
- Women: Isabelle Mouthon-Michellys (FRA); Marie Overbye (DEN) (junior)

The 1995 European Triathlon Championships, officially the 1995 Stockholm ETU Traithlon European Champonships, was the 11th edition of the European Triathlon Championships, held in Stockholm, Sweden, on 28 and 29 July 1995.

== Format ==
The competition was organised by European Triathlon Union (ETU) over the standard Olympic triathlon distance of a 1,500 m (1,600 yd) swim, a 40 km (25 mi) cycle, and a 10 km (6.2 mi) run. For the first time, the event was expanded to include junior races.

== Medal summary ==
Event	Gold		Silver		Bronze	
Men's elite	Rainer Müller-Hörner; Germany	1:46:24	Luc Van Lierde; Belgium	1:47:05	Spencer Smith; Great Britain	1:47:28
Women's elite	Isabelle Mouthon-Michellys; France	1:59:32	Natascha Badmann; Switzerland	2:01:12	Suzanne Nielsen; Denmark	2:02:20
Men's junior	Ralph Zeetsen; Netherlands	1:51:49	Yannick Bourseaux; France	1:52:56	Andreas Raelert; Germany	1:53:10
Women's junior	Marie Overbye; Denmark	2:04:30	Anja Dittmer; Germany	2:05:51	Katrin Helmcke; Germany	2:06:45

== Medal table ==
Rank	Nation	Gold	Silver	Bronze	Total
1	Germany (GER)	1	1	2	4
2	France (FRA)	1	1	0	2
3	Denmark (DEN)	1	0	1	2
4	Netherlands (NED)	1	0	0	1
5	Belgium (BEL)	0	1	0	1
5	Switzerland (SUI)	0	1	0	1
7	Great Britain (GBR)	0	0	1	1
Totals (7 entries)		4	4	4	12

== Results ==
=== Men ===
- Records of transition zone times are incomplete.

Rank	Athlete	Nation	Swim	T1	Bike	T2	Run	Overall time
1st place, gold medalist(s)	Rainer Müller-Hörner	Germany	16:19	0:58	55:45	—	33:20	1:46:24
2nd place, silver medalist(s)	Luc Van Lierde	Belgium	16:20	1:11	55:33	—	33:59	1:47:05
3rd place, bronze medalist(s)	Spencer Smith	Great Britain	15:55	1:01	56:07	—	34:23	1:47:28
4	Ralf Eggert	Germany	16:46	1:06	55:09	—	34:31	1:47:34
5	Olivier Marceau	Switzerland	18:56	1:10	54:57	—	34:50	1:47:55
6	Normann Stadler	Germany	17:18	—	55:46	—	34:55	1:48:00
7	Rob Barel	Netherlands	17:03	1:01	54:59	—	35:06	1:48:11
8	Dennis Looze	Netherlands	16:19	0:59	57:32	0:44	32:39	1:48:14
9	Markus Keller	Switzerland	17:08	0:51	55:03	—	35:13	1:48:14
10	Dmitriy Gaag	Kazakhstan	17:02	1:04	58:34	—	33:35	1:48:17
11	Christoph Mauch	Switzerland	17:49	0:58	54:10	—	35:23	1:48:23
12	Stefan Vuckovic	Germany	16:57	0:56	55:09	0:53	34:38	1:48:36
13	Jose Miguel Barbany Montada	Spain	17:40	1:04	55:58	0:49	32:24	1:48:56
14	Didier Volckaert	Belgium	17:54	1:11	58:24	3:22	34:51	1:48:58
15	Roland Knoll	Germany	15:57	0:58	57:48	1:13	33:06	1:49:01
16	Remy Rampteau	France	17:06	1:20	57:09	—	33:35	1:49:11
17	Martin Matula	Czech Republic	17:58	1:08	56:28	—	33:44	1:49:20
18	Péter Kropkó	Hungary	16:37	1:13	56:49	1:11	33:36	1:49:26
19	Peter Alder	Switzerland	17:03	0:54	55:53	—	35:42	1:49:34
20	Petteri Kosonen	Finland	17:01	1:10	54:56	—	36:39	1:49:47
21	Rene Milichovsky	Czech Republic	16:41	1:03	57:38	—	34:29	1:49:53
22	Emmanuel Dubreuil	France	17:04	0:41	55:24	—	36:45	1:49:57
23	Glenn Cook	Great Britain	18:19	—	54:48	—	37:10	1:50:16
24	Oliver Hufschmid	Switzerland	17:36	1:13	54:11	0:51	36:27	1:50:20
25	Carl Blasco	France	16:33	1:11	55:20	—	37:34	1:50:40
26	Stephan Bignet	France	16:12	1:03	57:30	0:49	35:10	1:50:46
27	Peter Sandvang	Denmark	17:13	1:06	54:43	2:24	35:31	1:50:58
28	Jack Maitland	Great Britain	17:30	1:06	54:28	—	38:01	1:51:07
29	Jiri Seidl	Czech Republic	19:04	1:13	56:44	—	34:12	1:51:14
30	Wolfgang Kattnig	Austria	17:52	1:04	55:44	—	36:44	1:51:26
31	Arnd Schomburg	Germany	17:56	1:03	57:07	—	35:51	1:51:59
32	Xavier Llobet Sallent	Spain	17:05	1:10	56:40	0:41	37:10	1:52:47
33	Paal Staven	Norway	16:53	06:12	51:39	—	38:28	1:53:13

=== Women ===
Rank	Athlete	Nation	Swim	T1	Bike	T2	Run	Overall time
1st place, gold medalist(s)	Isabelle Mouthon-Michellys	France	18:40	1:06	1:02:07	0:46	36:51	1:59:32
2nd place, silver medalist(s)	Natascha Badmann	Switzerland	20:50	1:08	59:40	0:41	38:51	2:01:12
3rd place, bronze medalist(s)	Suzanne Nielsen	Denmark	18:50	1:15	1:03:00	0:44	38:29	2:02:20
4	Beatrice Mouthon	France	18:55	1:16	1:03:17	0:49	38:33	2:02:52
5	Ute Schaefer	Germany	20:47	1:13	1:00:42	0:48	39:51	2:03:22
6	Ines Estedt	Germany	20:16	1:31	1:01:35	0:51	39:35	2:03:49
7	Mieke Suys	Belgium	19:21	1:03	1:02:58	0:46	40:08	2:04:17
8	Loretta Sollars	Great Britain	19:46	1:15	1:05:19	0:46	37:28	2:04:38
9	Jasmine Hämmerle	Austria	20:04	1:10	1:02:40	1:15	39:46	2:04:55
10	Wieke Hoogzaad	Netherlands	19:17	1:26	1:04:23	0:46	39:41	2:05:36
11	Sophie Delemer	France	19:47	1:16	1:02:05	1:08	41:25	2:05:42
12	Astrid Perathoner	Italy	19:26	1:15	1:04:24	0:53	40:30	2:06:30
13	Cedrine Soulet	France	20:00	1:23	1:04:10	0:51	40:44	2:06:41
14	Manuela Ianesi	Italy	19:21	1:13	1:04:34	0:49	40:44	2:06:43
15	Silke Hamacher	Germany	20:04	1:16	1:02:59	0:51	41:37	2:06:50
16	Marisa Gomez	Spain	18:56	1:11	1:04:57	0:49	41:15	2:07:11
17	Magali Di Marco Messmer	Switzerland	18:40	1:16	1:05:22	0:41	41:33	2:07:34
18	Simone Mortier	Germany	19:39	1:13	1:05:07	0:48	41:08	2:07:55
19	Maribel Blanco Velasco	Spain	19:51	1:16	1:07:17	0:49	38:45	2:08:02
20	Silvia Ricco	Italy	20:13	1:20	1:05:38	1:01	40:20	2:08:32
21	Asa Anderson	Sweden	19:32	1:15	1:03:09	0:49	44:00	2:08:44
22	Brigitte Scheithauer	Germany	18:42	1:11	1:04:30	0:48	43:47	2:08:58
23	Rachel Horn	Great Britain	20:40	1:26	1:04:32	1:03	41:23	2:09:06
24	Nancy Kemp-Arendt	Luxembourg	18:57	1:01	1:06:34	0:46	41:48	2:09:08
25	Jeannine De Ruysscher	Belgium	19:44	0:58	1:02:37	0:54	44:54	2:09:09
26	Kathleen Smet	Belgium	18:26	1:23	1:07:03	0:54	41:23	2:09:10
27	Ditte Thygesen	Denmark	18:38	1:23	1:06:33	0:46	42:12	2:09:33
28	Adél Molnár	Hungary	18:58	1:23	1:08:48	0:49	39:39	2:09:40
29	Nina Anisimova	Russia	18:59	1:08	1:06:22	0:53	42:50	2:10:14
30	Charlotte Sass Larsen	Denmark	20:39	1:34	1:08:25	1:11	38:36	2:10:27

=== Men junior ===
Rank	Athlete	Nation	Swim	T1	Bike	T2	Run	Overall time
1st place, gold medalist(s)	Ralph Zeetsen	Netherlands	16:48	1:18	57:35	0:46	35:20	1:51:49
2nd place, silver medalist(s)	Yannick Bourseaux	France	17:19	0:44	57:35	0:44	35:20	1:52:56
3rd place, bronze medalist(s)	Andreas Raelert	Germany	15:56	1:06	59:37	0:04	38:41	1:53:10
4	Markus Forster	Germany	17:02	1:03	58:21	0:41	36:27	1:53:37
5	Aart Kruis	Netherlands	16:43	1:13	58:32	—	37:19	1:53:49
6	David Castro Iglesias	Spain	19:21	—	58:43	0:46	35:01	1:53:51
7	Juanito Pirondeau	France	16:56	1:06	57:49	0:44	37:13	1:53:52
8	Jan Strangmuller	Czech Republic	16:58	1:06	57:43	0:46	37:29	1:54:04
9	Olivier Cardoen	Belgium	18:32	1:11	56:58	0:51	36:35	1:54:08
10	Alexandr Deputat	Russia	16:16	1:08	1:00:15	0:46	35:45	1:54:08
11	Allan Mansson	Denmark	16:24	1:01	58:19	0:39	37:59	1:54:25
12	David Williams	Great Britain	18:21	1:20	58:39	0:48	35:49	1:54:58
13	Ricardo Costa	Portugal	17:19	1:08	59:47	—	36:44	1:55:00
14	Zsolt Peleskei	Hungary	16:57	1:13	1:00:13	0:56	38:04	1:55:25
15	Gael Mainard	France	16:00	0:53	58:49	0:39	39:09	1:55:34
16	Tobias Henne	Germany	16:50	1:25	59:11	0:39	37:33	1:55:40
17	Sebastien Berlier	France	16:17	1:15	59:21	0:49	38:03	1:55:44
18	Péter Gazdag	Hungary	15:59	1:16	59:32	1:01	37:58	1:55:48
19	Ákos Angyaláti	Hungary	17:52	1:08	59:11	0:46	37:12	1:56:13
20	Huib Rost	Netherlands	17:01	1:20	1:00:02	0:44	37:18	1:56:24
21	Oleg Rantzow	Germany	17:03	1:20	1:00:44	—	37:22	1:56:31
22	Dirk Bockel	Luxembourg	17:31	1:15	59:14	0:49	39:36	1:58:25

=== Women junior ===
Rank	Athlete	Nation	Swim	T1	Bike	T2	Run	Overall time
1st place, gold medalist(s)	Marie Overbye	Denmark	19:04	1:13	1:03:10	0:51	37:55	2:04:30
2nd place, silver medalist(s)	Anja Dittmer	Germany	19:40	1:08	1:06:16	0:51	39:54	2:05:51
3rd place, bronze medalist(s)	Katrin Helmcke	Germany	20:15	1:20	1:03:34	0:48	40:47	2:06:45
4	Renata Berkova	Czech Republic	18:42	1:26	1:08:05	0:46	37:59	2:07:01
5	Joelle Tesche	Germany	18:46	1:16	1:07:30	0:44	39:06	2:07:24
6	Nathalie Daumas	France	19:15	1:11	1:04:57	0:56	41:14	2:07:34
7	Erika Molnár	Hungary	20:11	1:37	1:06:59	1:01	37:58	2:07:46
8	Silvia Pepels	Netherlands	18:51	—	1:06:28	0:53	42:57	2:09:10
9	Stephanie Deanaz	France	19:09	1:18	1:05:57	0:49	42:03	2:09:20
10	Valerie Aubry	France	18:34	1:13	1:07:59	0:48	41:28	2:10:04
11	Andrea Walkó	Hungary	18:13	1:13	1:08:00	0:53	43:57	2:10:19
12	Katja Pakarinen	Finland	19:07	1:21	1:04:48	0:51	44:43	2:10:52
13	Katerina Cupalova	Czech Republic	21:31	1:20	1:06:38	0:58	42:05	2:12:35
14	Nina Fischer	Germany	19:36	1:27	1:08:23	0:56	42:33	2:12:58
15	Petra Harangi	Hungary	18:43	1:16	1:06:31	0:56	45:44	2:13:11
16	Daniela Husarik	Switzerland	20:33	1:20	1:08:51	1:01	41:28	2:13:14
17	Magdalena Stovickova	Slovakia	18:42	1:25	1:06:23	0:56	46:48	2:14:19
18	Jessica Harrison	France	18:57	1:42	1:07:31	1:08	45:08	2:14:25
19	Sheila Bruist	Netherlands	21:06	1:18	1:05:50	0:53	45:22	2:14:30
20	Helene Rouan	France	18:44	—	1:06:45	0:58	49:03	2:15:30
