= 1991 European Triathlon Championships =

1991 edition of the European Triathlon Championships

- Venue: Geneva, Switzerland
- Dates: 8 September 1991

Champions
- Men: (United Kingdom) Simon Lessing
- Women: (France) Isabelle Mouthon-Michellys

The 1991 European Triathlon Championships also referred to as the 1991 Geneva ETU Triathlon European Championships, was the 7th edition of the European Triathlon Championships, held in Geneva, Switzerland, on 8 September 1991.

== Format ==
The competition was organised by European Triathlon Union (ETU) over the standard Olympic triathlon distance of a 1,500 m (1,600 yd) swim, a 40 km (25 mi) cycle, and a 10 km (6.2 mi) run, and crowned the continental champion for the season at that distance.

== Medal summary ==
Event	Gold		Silver		Bronze	
Men's individual	Simon Lessing; Great Britain	1:53:25	Rob Barel; Netherlands	1:54:08	Rémy Rampteau; France	1:54:11
Women's individual	Isabelle Mouthon-Michellys; France	2:07:52	Simone Mortier; Germany	2:08:39	Sonja Krolik; Germany	2:09:16
Men's team	Great Britain; Simon Lessing; Robin Brew; Glenn Cook		France; Rémy Rampteau; Patrick Girard; Philippe Fattori		Germany; Roland Knoll; Holger Lorenz; Erk Schröder	

== Medal table ==
* Host nation (Switzerland)

Rank	Nation	Gold	Silver	Bronze	Total
1	Great Britain (GBR)	2	0	0	2
2	France (FRA)	1	1	1	3
3	Germany (GER)	0	1	2	3
4	Netherlands (NED)	0	1	0	1
Totals (4 entries)		3	3	3	9

== 1991 European Youth and Junior Triathlon Championships ==
For the third time a set of championship races were held separately for youth and junior athletes, with team races included for the first time in Losheim, Germany.

Unusually, the junior men's race was won by the same athlete who would become senior men's champion, with Great Britain's Simon Lessing clinching both titles in two separate races.

=== Medal summary ===
Event	Gold		Silver		Bronze	
Men junior	Simon Lessing; Great Britain	1:58:09	Thomas Hellriegel; Germany	1:58:50	Ralf Eggert; Germany	1:59:08
Men junior team	Germany (GER); Thomas Hellriegel (1:58:50); Ralf Eggert (1:59:08); Olaf Sabatschus (2:02:46)	6:00:44	Great Britain (GBR); Simon Lessing (1:58:09); Matthew Bellfield (2:00:00); Julian Bunn (2:04:05)	6:02:14	France (FRA); Samuel Pierreclaud (2:01:00); Stéphane Sansorgne (2:01:40); François Chabaud (2:01:43)	6:04:23
Women junior	Francisca Rüssli; Switzerland	2:21:18	Nicole Mertes; Germany	2:21:51	Cédrine Soulet; France	2:22:38
Women junior team	Germany (GER); Nicole Mertes (2:21:51); Carina Zimmermann (2:29:47); Andrea Apel (2:31:15)	7:22:53	France (FRA); Cédrine Soulet (2:22:38); Sophie Goasdous (2:32:49); Sylvie Preterre (2:34:24)	7:29:51	only two entrants	
Men youth	Spencer Smith; Great Britain	2:00:29	Normann Stadler; Germany	2:01:55	Heiner Blattmann; Switzerland	2:02:20
Men youth team	Germany (GER); Normann Stadler (2:01:55); Stefan Hachul (2:04:01); Joachim Weinbrenner (2:08:04)	6:14:00	Switzerland (SUI); Heiner Blattmann (2:02:20); Oliver Hufschmid (2:06:38); Marcel Kuhn (2:07:28)	6:16:26	France (FRA); Olivier Marceau (2:03:38); Frédéric Lassaunière (2:07:50); Frank Bignet (2:09:05)	6:20:33
Women youth	Sonja Krolik; Germany	2:13:40	Carola Joerg; Germany	2:22:10	Zita Szabó; Hungary	2:23:35
Women youth team	Germany (GER); Sonja Krolik (2:13:40); Carola Joerg (2:22:10); Sabine Stelter (2:31:01)	7:06:51	Hungary (HUN); Zita Szabó (2:23:35); Györgyi Straubinger (2:24:40); Adél Molnár (2:30:39)	7:18:54	France (FRA); Sandrine Broussley (2:33:40); Magali Robin (2:35:55); Caroline Gaudenzi (2:36:23)	7:45:58

=== Medal table ===
* Host nation (Germany)

Rank	Nation	Gold	Silver	Bronze	Total
1	Germany (GER)*	5	4	1	10
2	Great Britain (GBR)	2	1	0	3
3	Switzerland (SUI)	1	1	1	3
4	France (FRA)	0	1	4	5
5	Hungary (HUN)	0	1	1	2
Totals (5 entries)		8	8	7	23
