= 1993 European Triathlon Championships =

1993 edition of the European Triathlon Championships

- Venue: Echternach, Luxembourg
- Dates: 4 July 1993
- Competitors: 114 (74 men, 40 women)

Champions
- Men: Simon Lessing (GBR) - (2nd title)
- Women: Simone Westhoff (GER)

The 1993 European Triathlon Championships, offically the 1993 Echternach ETU Triathlon European Championships was the 9th edition of the European Triathlon Championships, held in Echternach, Luxembourg, on 4 July 1993. The competition was organised by European Triathlon Union (ETU) over the standard Olympic triathlon distance of a 1,500 m (1,600 yd) swim, a 40 km (25 mi) cycle, and a 10 km (6.2 mi) run.

== Medal summary ==
In the 1993 edition of the chmpionships, the tam competitions were not contested.

Event	Gold		Silver		Bronze	
Men's individual	Simon Lessing; Great Britain	1:54:04	Thomas Hellriegel; Germany	1:54:27	Rainer Müller-Hörner; Germany	1:54:59
Women's individual	Simone Westhoff; Germany	2:08:58	Simone Mortier; Germany	2:10:17	Lydie Reuze; France	2:10:51

== Medal table ==
* Host nation (Luxembourg)

Rank	Nation	Gold	Silver	Bronze	Total
1	Germany (GER)	1	2	1	4
2	Great Britain (GBR)	1	0	0	1
3	France (FRA)	0	0	1	1
Totals (3 entries)		2	2	2	6

== Results ==
=== Men ===
Rank	Athlete	Nation	Swim	T1	Bike	T2	Run	Overall time
1st place, gold medalist(s)	Simon Lessing	Great Britain	19:20	1:11	59:34	0:41	33:15	1:54:04
2nd place, silver medalist(s)	Thomas Hellriegel	Germany	21:09	1:18	57:47	0:41	33:30	1:54:27
3rd place, bronze medalist(s)	Rainer Müller-Hörner	Germany	20:10	1:18	58:35	1:08	33:46	1:54:59
4	Holger Lorenz	Germany	20:40	1:11	58:13	1:30	33:34	1:55:09
5	Rob Barel	Netherlands	20:22	1:13	59:04	0:36	34:17	1:55:33
6	Philippe Fattori	France	21:00	1:42	59:10	0:41	33:07	1:55:42
7	Robin Brew	Great Britain	19:19	1:23	58:10	0:46	36:14	1:55:53
8	Rémy Rampteau	France	21:13	1:16	59:26	0:39	33:25	1:56:02
9	Roland Knoll	Germany	20:09	1:04	1:01:04	0:44	33:14	1:56:18
10	Danny Simons	Belgium	20:37	1:21	59:41	0:44	34:08	1:56:33
11	Kris Marien	Belgium	21:38	1:27	58:13	0:49	34:33	1:56:42
12	Serge Lecrique	France	20:42	1:25	59:24	0:51	34:25	1:56:48
13	Philippe Méthion	France	20:00	1:23	58:41	0:36	36:27	1:57:10
14	Eduardo Burguete Babi	Spain	19:57	1:11	1:01:14	0:43	34:11	1:57:16
15	Ralf Eggert	Germany	19:55	1:30	59:38	0:41	35:36	1:57:23
16	Oliver Hufschmid	Switzerland	20:12	1:16	58:49	0:46	36:43	1:57:49
17	Bent Andersen	Denmark	21:07	1:30	1:01:28	0:46	32:59	1:57:52
18	Magnus Almen	Sweden	20:55	1:30	59:53	0:51	34:52	1:58:05
19	Dmitriy Gaag	Kazakhstan	20:28	1:37	1:00:46	0:44	34:38	1:58:16
20	Jorge Puebla Garcia	Spain	20:33	1:46	59:37	0:44	35:40	1:58:23
21	Pierre Houseaux	France	20:06	1:23	1:00:06	0:41	36:08	1:58:26
22	Andrey Makushin	Russia	20:41	1:25	59:58	0:54	35:33	1:58:33
23	Arnd Schomburg	Germany	19:48	1:26	0:00	0:41	36:40	1:58:36
24	Dirk Van Gossum	Belgium	21:48	1:21	1:00	0:44	34:49	1:58:45
25	Johan Callebaut	Belgium	20:38	1:23	59:54	0:44	36:39	1:59:19
26	Jean-Christophe Guinchard	Switzerland	20:37	1:11	1:00:01	0:37	36:56	1:59:26
27	Peter-Johan Dillo	Netherlands	20:28	1:23	1:00:16	0:48	36:37	1:59:32
28	Péter Kropkó	Hungary	20:24	1:34	1:02:03	0:56	34:49	1:59:47
29	Borja Oses García	Spain	20:58	1:33	59:28	2:31	35:20	1:59:53
30	Jack Maitland	Great Britain	21:08	1:41	1:00:34	1:46	34:50	2:00:00
31	Rene Milichovsky	Czech Republic	20:26	1:18	1:00:16	0:46	37:23	2:00:09
32	Thorbjorn Jensen	Denmark	22:58	1:15	1:00:01	0:48	35:08	2:00:10
33	Michel Kunic	Slovakia	19:32	1:35	1:00:04	1:32	37:39	2:00:22
34	Tibor Lehmann	Hungary	22:15	1:27	1:01:35	0:45	34:31	2:00:33
35	Gianpietro De Faveri	Italy	19:26	1:33	1:01:15	1:36	38:10	2:01:00
36	Norbert Domnik	Austria	21:45	1:35	1:01:19	1:10	35:20	2:01:09
37	Henrik Nöbbelin	Sweden	20:31	1:32	1:02:14	0:49	36:04	2:01:10
38	Tim Stewart	Great Britain	22:41	1:19	1:00:52	0:53	36:34	2:01:19
39	Jakob Hechenberger	Austria	20:34	1:38	59:52	0:45	38:57	2:01:46
40	Luc Van Lierde	Belgium	20:06	1:14	1:03:37	0:50	36:03	2:01:50
41	Zsolt Zsódér	Hungary	22:55	1:25	1:02:45	0:47	34:32	2:02:24
42	Herbert Forster	Austria	19:51	1:26	1:01:11	1:39	38:40	2:02:47
43	Gabriel Baran	Slovakia	19:58	1:23	1:02:55	0:48	37:56	2:03:00
44	Jiri Seidl	Czech Republic	21:03	1:31	59:34	0:42	40:47	2:03:38
45	Maurizio De Benedetti	Italy	20:33	1:35	1:03:13	0:53	37:32	2:03:46
46	Pietro Giorgetti	Italy	22:44	1:14	1:04:07	0:45	35:11	2:04:01
47	Rolf Kristian Roll	Norway	22:34	1:33	1:02:25	0:50	37:04	2:04:26
48	Martin Poledna	Slovakia	20:16	1:25	1:00:17	3:38	38:55	2:04:31
49	Sergey Piatigorskiy	Russia	21:14	1:37	1:04:21	1:05	36:17	2:04:34
50	Pedro Cordeiro	Portugal	22:02	1:34	1:01:32	0:47	38:49	2:04:44
51	Helge Lorenz	Austria	20:55	1:10	1:02:11	1:25	39:52	2:05:33
52	Erwin De Bruijn	Netherlands	20:14	1:25	1:00:02	0:41	43:24	2:05:46
53	Frank Graftdyk	Netherlands	21:51	1:23	1:05:08	0:48	36:39	2:05:49
54	Paal Staven	Norway	19:30	1:49	1:03:27	0:48	40:18	2:05:52
55	Dan Dethier	Luxembourg	22:47	1:31	1:01:01	0:40	40:50	2:06:49
56	Erik Johnsen	Norway	19:42	1:30	1:06:54	0:50	38:00	2:06:56
57	Steve Thull	Luxembourg	22:43	1:32	1:03:08	0:58	40:47	2:09:08
58	Claude Guden	Luxembourg	22:50	1:27	1:04:54	0:54	39:31	2:09:36
59	Paulo Pereira	Portugal	21:11	1:42	1:08:24	1:11	38:14	2:10:42
60	Bogumil Gluszkowski	Poland	22:33	1:32	1:06:55	1:01	38:42	2:10:43
61	Margus Tamm	Estonia	24:15	1:34	1:05:36	0:52	38:45	2:11:02
62	Carlos Brito	Portugal	24:12	1:26	1:08:14	0:52	36:48	2:11:32
63	Balázs Emhő	Hungary	20:04	1:22	1:05:26	0:56	44:31	2:12:19
64	Pawel Kolwalewski	Poland	20:36	1:24	1:07:21	0:54	42:21	2:12:36
65	Andrey Myberg	Israel	23:02	1:44	1:06:05	1:22	41:43	2:13:56
66	Slavomir Kois	Slovakia	20:20	1:34	1:10:05	0:51	41:11	2:14:01
67	Samuel Blattman	Switzerland	20:46	1:27	59:37	0:43	52:00	2:14:33
68	René Lieners	Luxembourg	24:14	1:26	1:08:26	0:50	41:16	2:16:12
69	Brian Linehan	Ireland	29:14	2:06	1:06:05	0:48	39:14	2:17:27
70	Michael Schädler	Liechtenstein	28:11	1:28	1:09:47	0:51	39:20	2:19:37
71	Michael McCarron	Ireland	27:22	2:01	1:09:00	1:07	43:50	2:23:20
72	Andres Kubar	Estonia	25:39	1:40	1:11:03	0:59	44:49	2:24:10
73	Bisser Boukreev	Bulgaria	23:03	1:26	1:16:00	1:31	44:00	2:26:00
74	Mark Limanov	Israel	21:15	2:01	1:15:49	1:07	48:12	2:28:24

=== Women ===
Rank	Athlete	Nation	Swim	T1	Bike	T2	Run	Overall time
1st place, gold medalist(s)	Simone Westhoff	Germany	20:37	1:11	1:06:49	1:06	39:16	2:08:58
2nd place, silver medalist(s)	Simone Mortier	Germany	22:26	1:13	1:06:03	0:43	39:51	2:10:17
3rd place, bronze medalist(s)	Lydie Reuzé	France	21:07	1:08	1:09:02	0:46	38:45	2:10:51
4	Anette Pedersen	Denmark	22:31	1:16	1:05:44	0:56	40:57	2:11:27
5	Isabelle Mouthon-Michellys	France	21:24	1:06	1:11:06	0:54	38:02	2:12:36
6	Irma Heeren	Netherlands	24:58	1:34	1:07:53	0:56	37:31	2:12:53
7	Jacqueline Sommer	Switzerland	23:04	1:16	1:07:17	1:23	40:35	2:13:38
8	Lone Larsen	Denmark	22:30	1:20	1:08:09	0:53	40:48	2:13:41
9	Natascha Badmann	Switzerland	25:13	1:11	1:07:49	0:46	39:24	2:14:28
10	Suzanne Nielsen	Denmark	21:25	1:13	1:09:41	0:49	41:21	2:14:32
11	Béatrice Mouthon	France	22:20	1:03	1:10:26	0:54	40:05	2:14:52
12	Francisca Rüssli	Switzerland	22:52	1:39	1:08:08	0:49	41:34	2:15:03
13	Cedrine Soulet	France	22:37	1:18	1:08:55	0:49	41:31	2:15:11
14	Brigitte Scheithauer	Germany	21:21	1:15	1:09:39	0:44	42:30	2:15:28
15	Jitske Cats	Netherlands	26:04	1:25	1:09:08	1:04	38:15	2:15:58
16	Dolorita Gerber	Switzerland	23:41	1:30	1:10:11	1:08	40:22	2:16:56
17	Mirella Gandellini	Italy	25:12	1:29	1:09:50	1:08	39:22	2:17:02
18	Asa Anderson	Sweden	24:03	1:23	1:09:48	0:49	42:16	2:18:20
19	Christel Van Eesbeek	Belgium	26:33	1:18	1:09:06	1:01	40:27	2:18:27
20	Ali Harrison	Great Britain	24:09	1:26	1:10:57	0:58	42:30	2:20:04
21	Maria Kuriackova	Slovakia	26:22	1:23	1:12:11	1:08	39:23	2:20:29
22	Katariina Ebeling	Finland	23:39	1:20	1:10:31	0:56	44:18	2:20:46
23	Franziska Lilienfein	Germany	22:28	1:34	1:09:37	0:51	46:28	2:21:00
24	Anna Krivda	Russia	24:04	1:30	1:12:26	1:04	42:27	2:21:31
25	Nancy Kemp-Arendt	Luxembourg	21:22	1:38	1:15:00	0:58	42:43	2:21:43
26	Silvia Ricco	Italy	23:10	1:20	1:14:16	0:59	42:13	2:21:59
27	Katarina Andersson	Sweden	23:11	1:33	1:14:13	0:53	42:23	2:22:15
28	Maribel Blanco Velasco	Spain	24:06	1:42	1:13:24	0:58	42:33	2:22:47
29	Christine De Wit	Netherlands	24:56	1:34	1:12:21	1:03	43:43	2:23:37
30	Manuela Ianesi	Italy	22:34	1:23	1:15:04	0:58	43:38	2:23:40
31	Ditte Thygesen	Denmark	21:13	1:25	1:16:58	1:00	43:30	2:24:06
32	Laura Garcia Perez	Spain	22:13	1:31	1:15:28	1:05	43:56	2:24:13
33	Shirley Yarde	Great Britain	25:09	1:26	1:12:14	0:54	44:59	2:24:42
34	Helen Peelo	Ireland	26:44	1:34	1:12:45	1:39	42:26	2:25:08
35	Ann-Charlotte Thoren	Sweden	24:32	1:40	1:14:35	1:06	44:42	2:26:35
36	Éva Eszesné Vas	Hungary	23:35	1:18	1:19:00	0:57	42:50	2:27:40
37	Virginia Berasategi Luna	Spain	22:23	1:38	1:17:10	0:53	46:10	2:28:14
38	Linda Mcanee	Ireland	24:13	1:29	1:20:15	1:06	45:03	2:32:06
39	Anna Sulima	Poland	24:09	1:43	1:21:27	1:12	47:12	2:35:43
40	Margaret Burns	Ireland	34:57	1:44	1:23:07	1:24	44:38	2:45:50
