= 1988 European Triathlon Championships =

1988 edition of the European Triathlon Championships

- Venue: Venice, Italy
- Dates: 20 June 1988

Champions
- Men: (Netherlands) Rob Barel (Men) 4th title
- Women: (United Kingdom) Sarah Springman (Women) 1st title

The 1988 European Triathlon Championships (officially the 1988 Venice ETU Triathlon European Championships) was the fourth edition of the European Triathlon Championships, held in Venice, Italy, on 20 June 1988.

== Summary ==
Organised by the European Triathlon Union (ETU), the competition was contested over the standard Olympic triathlon distance of a 1,500 m (1,600 yd) swim, a 40 km (25 mi) cycle, and a 10 km (6.2 mi) run.

In the elite men's race, defending champion Rob Barel of the Netherlands won his fourth consecutive European title in 1:50:23, finishing 38 seconds ahead of Belgium's Didier Volckaert, while West Germany's Jochen Basting took bronze eight seconds further back in 1:51:09. As of 2026, Barel's four consecutive titles have never been equalled, while his four titles overall has only been matched by Alistair Brownlee and Javier Gómez.

In the elite women's competition, Great Britain's Sarah Springman finally claimed the European title, having won silver medals in 1986 and 1987, crossing the finishing line in 2:04:53, 19 seconds ahead of Switzerland's Dolorita Gerber and Denmark's Pernille Svarre a further two minutes behind.

== Medal summary ==
Event	Gold		Silver		Bronze	
Men's individual	Rob Barel; Netherlands	1:50:23	Didier Volckaert; Belgium	1:51:01	Jochen Basting; West Germany	1:51:09
Women's individual	Sarah Springman; Great Britain	2:04:53	Dolorita Gerber; Switzerland	2:05:12	Pernille Svarre; Denmark	2:07:17

== Results ==
Results after the top ten, and in-race splits, in each race have not been fully preserved.

=== Elite Men ===
Rank	Name	Nation	Time
1st place, gold medalist(s)	Rob Barel	Netherlands	1:50:23
2nd place, silver medalist(s)	Didier Volckaert	Belgium	1:51:01
3rd place, bronze medalist(s)	Jochen Basting	West Germany	1:51:09
4	Glenn Cook	Great Britain	1:51:17
5	Michael Thorén	Sweden	1:51:24
6	Hermann Kramer	West Germany	1:52:26
7	Christophe Herveieu	France	1:52:34
8	Wolfgang Dittrich	West Germany	1:53:10
9	Lucien Loyens	Netherlands	1:53:15
10	Alain Lorenzati	Italy	1:53:30

=== Elite Women ===
Rank	Name	Nation	Time
1st place, gold medalist(s)	Sarah Springman	Great Britain	2:04:53
2nd place, silver medalist(s)	Dolorita Gerber	Switzerland	2:05:12
3rd place, bronze medalist(s)	Pernille Svarre	Denmark	2:07:17
4	Doris Trueman	Australia	2:07:42
5	Simone Mortier	West Germany	2:07:47
6	Elisabeth Poncelet	France	2:08:19
7	Anne-Marie Rouchon	France	2:09:32
8	Kirsten Ullrich	West Germany	2:09:55
9	Katrin Dürholt	West Germany	2:10:17
10	Anita Lenti	Hungary	2:10:27

== Medal table ==
* Host nation (Italy)

Rank	Nation	Gold	Silver	Bronze	Total
1	Great Britain (GBR)	1	0	0	1
1	Netherlands (NED)	1	0	0	1
3	Belgium (BEL)	0	1	0	1
3	Switzerland (SUI)	0	1	0	1
5	Denmark (DEN)	0	0	1	1
5	West Germany (FRG)	0	0	1	1
Totals (6 entries)		2	2	2	6
