= 1985 European Triathlon Championships =

1st edition of the European Triathlon Championships

1985 ETU Triathlon European Championships
- Venue: Immenstadt
- Location: Immenstadt, West Germany
- Dates: 27 July 1985

Medalists
gold medal	Rob Barel	Netherlands
gold medal	Alexandra Kremer	West Germany
silver medal	Klaus Klären	West Germany
silver medal	Anna-Lena Fritzon	Sweden
bronze medal	Jörg Hoffmann	West Germany
bronze medal	Sarah Coope	Great Britain

The 1985 ETU Triathlon European Championships was the inaugural edition of the event now known as the Europe Triathlon Championships, held on 27 July 1985 in Immenstadt, West Germany. Organised by the European Triathlon Union (ETU) alongside the annual Allgäu Triathlon, the championships contested the standard distance for the Allgäu Triathlon - a 1.3 km swim in the Großer Alpsee, a challenging 60 km bike stage through the Allgäu Alps with a number of steep climbs including Kalvarienberg, and a 12 km combined road and trail run.

== Overview ==
Because international triathlon governance was still in its early stages prior to the founding of the International Triathlon Union in 1989, ETU rules in 1985 permitted non-European athletes to enter and race openly in the championship events. However, official European Championship titles and medals were restricted exclusively to athletes representing European national federations.

In the women's race, Erin Baker of New Zealand crossed the finish line first overall in 2:51:18, finishing nearly fifteen minutes ahead of the rest of the field. Under ETU championship regulations, the European gold medal was awarded to the highest-finishing European competitor, Alexandra Kremer of West Germany (3:06:02), with Anna-Lena Fritzon of Sweden taking silver and Sarah Coope of Great Britain claiming bronze.

In the men's event, Rob Barel of the Netherlands won both the overall race and the European title in 2:37:42, marking the first of his four consecutive European Championship victories. West German athletes Klaus Klären and Jörg Hoffmann finished second and third respectively to secure silver and bronze.

== Medal summary ==
Event	Gold		Silver		Bronze	
Men's individual	Rob Barel (NED)	2:37:42	Klaus Klären (FRG)	2:38:41	Jörg Hoffmann (FRG)	2:41:04
Women's individual	Alexandra Kremer (FRG)	3:06:02	Anna-Lena Fritzon (SWE)	3:07:28	Sarah Coope (GBR)	3:08:07

== Medal table ==
* Host nation (West Germany)

Rank	Nation	Gold	Silver	Bronze	Total
1	West Germany	1	1	1	3
2	Netherlands	1	0	0	1
3	Sweden	0	1	0	1
4	Great Britain	0	0	1	1
Totals (4 entries)		2	2	2	6

== Full results ==
- Transition zone times were not recorded separately in these championships.

=== Men ===
Champs. rank	Race rank	Athlete	Nation	Swim	Bike	Run	Total time
1st place, gold medalist(s)	1	Rob Barel	Netherlands	19:59	1:33:27	44:16	2:37:42
2nd place, silver medalist(s)	2	Klaus Klären	West Germany	22:37	1:33:55	42:09	2:38:41
3rd place, bronze medalist(s)	3	Jörg Hoffmann	West Germany	20:27	1:34:38	45:59	2:41:04
4	4	Yves Cordier	France	18:27	1:36:01	46:59	2:41:27
5	5	Dirk Aschmoneit	West Germany	19:01	1:39:19	43:25	2:41:45
6	6	Gerhard Wachter	West Germany	20:13	1:37:12	44:30	2:41:55
—	7	Alexander Albert Szirmai	Mexico	21:42	1:37:27	43:19	2:42:28
7	8	Peter Zijerveld	Netherlands	25:53	1:31:30	45:20	2:42:43
8	9	Hannes Blaschke	West Germany	23:11	1:33:17	46:23	2:42:51
9	10	Karel Blondeel	Belgium	20:47	1:36:46	45:29	2:43:02
10	11	Thomas Scheld	West Germany	21:17	1:36:10	45:43	2:43:10
11	11	Otto Hoter	West Germany	22:05	1:34:59	46:06	2:43:10
11	13	Gernot Rupp	West Germany	22:29	1:35:22	45:21	2:43:12
13	14	Axel Koenders	Netherlands	20:53	1:33:19	50:00	2:44:12
14	15	Goof Schep	Netherlands	24:24	1:34:08	46:08	2:44:40
15	16	Oliver Graf	West Germany	21:58	1:39:20	44:02	2:45:20
16	17	Jörg Ullmann	West Germany	20:54	1:41:23	43:14	2:45:31
—	18	John Hellemans	New Zealand	20:18	1:38:21	46:58	2:45:37
17	19	Thomas Jeltsch	West Germany	25:37	1:36:29	43:38	2:45:44
18	20	Peter Moysey	Great Britain	23:08	1:38:59	43:49	2:45:56
19	21	Gordon Novak	West Germany	22:48	1:39:15	44:07	2:46:10
20	22	Georges Belaubre	France	22:41	1:34:45	48:56	2:46:22
21	23	Richard van Diesen	Netherlands	20:51	1:37:45	47:55	2:46:31
22	23	Glenn Cook	Great Britain	20:23	1:41:35	44:33	2:46:31
23	25	Karl-Heinz Morath	West Germany	24:33	1:37:30	44:48	2:46:51
24	26	Michael Thorén	Sweden	20:20	1:41:58	44:43	2:47:01
25	27	Alfons Hamblock	Belgium	20:16	1:40:30	46:38	2:47:24
26	28	Harald Vogler	West Germany	20:12	1:38:58	49:21	2:48:31
27	29	Andreas Keppeler	West Germany	20:23	1:41:43	46:45	2:48:51
28	30	Gerd Amrhein	West Germany	23:19	1:40:55	44:59	2:49:13
29	31	Jean-Gabriel Cordier	France	22:33	1:36:09	50:47	2:49:29
30	32	Örjan Sandler	Sweden	25:57	1:38:49	45:02	2:49:48
31	33	Vernon Sharples	Great Britain	23:04	1:41:24	45:28	2:49:56
32	34	Günter Kraus	West Germany	30:07	1:36:18	43:39	2:50:04
33	35	Anton Rattensberger	Austria	24:35	1:37:34	47:59	2:50:08
34	36	Lars Bartz	West Germany	20:00	1:42:14	48:14	2:50:28
35	37	Josef Riedenauer	West Germany	22:31	1:39:45	48:28	2:50:44
36	38	Johan Druwe	Belgium	28:42	1:39:30	42:33	2:50:45
37	39	Danny Suls	Belgium	25:29	1:40:51	44:29	2:50:49
38	40	Hermann Kramer	West Germany	24:21	1:42:44	43:47	2:50:52
39	41	Sven Riedesel	West Germany	20:01	1:44:32	46:28	2:51:01
40	41	Herbert Rattensberger	Austria	25:10	1:39:33	46:18	2:51:01
41	43	Joseph Brugger	Switzerland	26:04	1:38:38	46:45	2:51:27
42	44	A.J.M. Kempen	Netherlands	22:47	1:39:08	49:36	2:51:31
43	45	Huub Stammes	Netherlands	24:31	1:39:38	47:39	2:51:48
44	46	Hilco Compagner	Netherlands	25:40	1:39:00	47:13	2:51:53
45	47	François Danel	France	25:26	1:40:58	45:37	2:52:01
46	48	Rainer Müller-Hörner	West Germany	20:18	1:38:49	53:13	2:52:20
47	48	Leif Andersson	Sweden	23:21	1:41:29	47:30	2:52:20
48	50	Charly Doll	West Germany	28:32	1:40:06	43:55	2:52:33
49	51	Lee Martin	Great Britain	24:41	1:41:29	46:36	2:52:46
50	52	Israel Gernot	West Germany	24:32	1:40:37	47:45	2:52:54
—	53	Roger De Moraes	Brazil	27:32	1:31:51	53:36	2:52:59
51	54	Gerd Uhren	West Germany	23:07	1:41:41	48:49	2:53:37
52	55	Gunter Stenger	West Germany	24:29	1:41:33	47:48	2:53:50
53	55	Steffen Roessle	West Germany	29:20	1:37:00	47:30	2:53:50
54	55	Ingo Hoffmann	West Germany	21:37	1:43:54	48:19	2:53:50
55	58	Tom Ullmann	West Germany	25:16	1:42:43	45:59	2:53:58
56	59	Michael Schuler	West Germany	23:15	1:37:18	53:34	2:54:07
57	59	Konrad Schmidhuber	West Germany	29:37	1:36:45	47:45	2:54:07
58	59	Othmar Brügger	Switzerland	24:30	1:40:15	49:22	2:54:07
59	62	Christoph Draesner	West Germany	21:56	1:41:52	50:51	2:54:39
60	63	R.t. De Kuiper	Netherlands	22:27	1:39:30	52:48	2:54:45
61	64	Howard Jones	Great Britain	24:10	1:41:23	49:18	2:54:51
62	65	Alain Rossillon	France	28:20	1:37:54	48:46	2:55:00
63	66	Jürgen Pfaff	West Germany	21:52	1:46:05	47:04	2:55:01
64	67	Ralf Homeister	West Germany	29:08	1:40:02	45:56	2:55:06
65	68	Alexander Maasdijk	Netherlands	22:03	1:40:08	52:56	2:55:07
66	69	Frank Weiss	West Germany	25:28	1:41:01	48:50	2:55:19
67	70	Gerhard Müller	West Germany	28:44	1:39:45	47:01	2:55:30
68	71	Frank Horlacher	West Germany	26:39	1:40:21	48:32	2:55:32
69	72	Manfred Träger	West Germany	29:33	1:42:42	43:19	2:55:34
70	73	Dieter Waller	West Germany	26:48	1:42:44	46:04	2:55:36
—	74	John Winterdyk	Canada	25:27	1:42:13	47:58	2:55:38
71	75	Günter Fromme	West Germany	27:04	1:39:05	49:48	2:55:57
72	76	Jochen Schalk	West Germany	22:21	1:39:41	54:08	2:56:10
73	76	Thomas Dengler	West Germany	26:13	1:42:20	47:37	2:56:10
74	78	Jim Koster	Netherlands	22:35	1:45:19	48:26	2:56:20

=== Women ===
Champs rank	Race rank	Athlete	Nation	Swim	Bike	Run	Total time
—	1	Erin Baker	New Zealand	20:47	1:41:21	49:10	02:51:18
1st place, gold medalist(s)	2	Alexandra Kremer	West Germany	26:27	1:45:15	54:20	03:06:02
2nd place, silver medalist(s)	3	Anna-Lena Fritzon	Sweden	28:39	1:48:27	50:22	03:07:28
3rd place, bronze medalist(s)	4	Sarah Coope	Great Britain	26:13	1:49:22	52:32	03:08:07
4	5	Chantal Malherbe	France	27:33	1:48:48	53:05	3:09:26
5	6	Lieve Cappaert-Paulus	Belgium	20:03	1:51:58	58:17	3:10:18
6	7	Meeri Bodelid	Sweden	32:39	1:50:11	49:09	3:11:59
7	8	Anette Bøe	Norway	31:43	1:50:17	50:50	3:12:50
8	9	Ulrike Wefers	West Germany	24:37	1:53:33	56:16	3:14:26
9	10	Birgitta Sandahl	Sweden	26:27	1:55:18	52:53	3:14:38
10	11	Odile Lagarde	France	28:31	1:55:05	54:01	3:17:37
11	12	Astrid Flieder	Austria	27:25	1:55:23	55:07	3:17:55
12	13	Angelika Darsch	West Germany	37:04	1:45:29	57:38	3:20:11
13	14	Dagmar Reim	West Germany	28:29	1:58:26	55:45	3:22:40
14	15	Christina Rudolf	West Germany	30:54	1:55:35	57:38	3:24:07
15	16	Jean Folan	Ireland	30:48	2:00:29	53:27	3:24:44
16	17	Hanni Zehendner	West Germany	32:00	1:59:06	53:41	3:24:47
17	18	Michaela Guth	West Germany	32:26	1:49:37	1:03:19	3:25:22
18	19	Iris Weiss	West Germany	33:51	1:57:24	55:10	3:26:25
—	20	Cristi Lippert	United States	27:01	1:56:08	1:03:59	3:27:08
19	21	Birgit Rosberg-Seubert	West Germany	23:02	2:00:38	1:05:51	3:29:31
20	22	Tinka Wiegand	West Germany	25:36	2:05:51	59:18	3:30:45
21	23	Siglinde Reim	West Germany	28:29	2:08:37	58:09	3:35:15
22	24	Gabriela Hirsemann	West Germany	32:25	1:51:35	1:11:21	3:35:21
23	25	Heide Schlosser	West Germany	29:28	2:08:12	58:24	3:36:04
24	26	Gabriella Leutwyler	Switzerland	35:13	1:58:06	1:04:07	3:37:26
25	27	N. Van Zanten	Netherlands	27:10	2:01:44	1:09:40	3:38:34
26	28	Pascale Lafosse	France	31:27	2:03:02	1:04:10	3:38:39
27	29	Ulrike Kirschke	West Germany	33:53	2:02:48	1:02:08	3:38:49
28	29	Inge Greffin	West Germany	37:06	2:01:50	59:53	3:38:49
29	31	Monika Servichio	Switzerland	34:19	2:03:26	1:02:08	3:39:53
29	32	Heidi Schätzle	West Germany	38:42	1:58:55	1:02:29	3:40:06
31	33	Hannelore Kruse	West Germany	29:05	2:02:49	1:09:14	3:41:08
32	34	Susanne Steinhilber	West Germany	29:03	2:04:29	1:08:22	3:41:54
33	34	Claudia Diebold	West Germany	28:39	2:04:30	1:08:45	3:41:54
34	36	Andrea Kögel	West Germany	34:04	2:03:00	1:05:05	3:42:09
34	37	Anni Lang	Austria	34:35	2:06:49	1:01:37	3:43:01
36	38	Katrin Schöngart	West Germany	32:24	2:11:40	1:00:18	3:44:22
37	39	Elfriede Moder-Frei	West Germany	31:34	2:10:18	1:02:50	3:44:42

== Team relay championships ==
A separate European Team Relay Championships for men was held in Northern Ireland in 1985, recognised retrospectively by both Europe Triathlon and World Triathlon, but for which extant records are scant. The event consisted of three legs :each leg consisting of a 300 metre swim, a bike leg of 7.4 km and a run leg 1.6 km. Team Netherlands, consisting of Rob Barel, Frank Huls and Axel Koenders, is recorded as the winner of this event for which other participant details have been lost.
