= 1986 European Triathlon Championships =

Triathlon competition

- Venue: Milton Keynes, United Kingdom
- Dates: 22 June 1986

Champions
- Men: (Netherlands) Rob Barel (Men) (2nd title)
- Women: (Belgium) Lieve Cappaert-Paulus (Women)

The 1986 European Triathlon Championships (officially the 1986 Milton Keynes ETU Triathlon European Championships) was the second edition of the European Triathlon Championships, held in Milton Keynes, United Kingdom, on 22 June 1986.

== Summary ==
Organised by the European Triathlon Union (ETU), the competition was contested over the standard Olympic triathlon distance of a 1,500 m (1,600 yd) swim, a 40 km (25 mi) cycle, and a 10 km (6.2 mi) run.

In the elite men's race, defending champion Rob Barel of the Netherlands retained his European title with a winning time of 1:59:50, finishing twenty seconds ahead of Jürgen Zäck of West Germany, while fellow West German and 1985 bronze medallist Jörg Hoffmann took bronze again.

In the women's event, Belgium's Lieve Cappaert-Paulus won the gold medal, completing the course in 2:17:00, ahead of British competitors Sarah Springman and Sarah Coope, who claimed silver and bronze respectively, Coope's second successive bronze medal.

== Medal summary ==
Event	Gold		Silver		Bronze	
Men's individual	Rob Barel; Netherlands	1:59:50	Jürgen Zäck; West Germany	2:00:10	Jörg Hoffmann; West Germany	2:00:40
Women's individual	Lieve Cappaert-Paulus; Belgium	2:17:00	Sarah Springman; Great Britain	2:18:40	Sarah Coope; Great Britain	2:21:50

== Medal table ==
* Host nation (Great Britain)

Rank	Nation	Gold	Silver	Bronze	Total
1	Belgium (BEL)	1	0	0	1
1	Netherlands (NED)	1	0	0	1
3	Great Britain (GBR)	0	1	1	2
3	West Germany (FRG)	0	1	1	2
Totals (4 entries)		2	2	2	6

== Team relay championships ==
A separate European Team Relay Championships for men was held in Mansfield, United Kingdom in May 1986, recognised retrospectively by both Europe Triathlon and World Triathlon, but for which extant records are scant. The medallists of the event, without times, are recorded by World Triathlon as West Germany, Great Britain and Belgium.

Event	Gold	Silver	Bronze
Team relay Men	Team West Germany (FRG)	Team Great Britain (GBR)	Team Belgium (BEL)
