= 1987 European Triathlon Championships =

1987 edition of the European Triathlon Championships

- Venue: Marseille, France
- Dates: 31 May 1987

Champions
- Men: Rob Barel (NED) (3rd title)
- Women: Sarah Coope (GBR) (1st title)

The 1987 European Triathlon Championships (officially the 1987 Marseille ETU Triathlon European Championships) was the third edition of the Europe Triathlon Championships, organised by the European Triathlon Union (ETU).

The event took place on 31 May 1987 in Marseille, France. As with other early editions of the championships, full start lists and results have not been preserved.

== Summary ==
In the men's elite race, defending champion Rob Barel of the Netherlands won his third consecutive European title, finishing ahead of France's Philippe Méthion and Belgium's Karel Blondeel.

In the women's elite race, the bronze medalist from both 1985 and 1986, Sarah Coope won the gold medal ahead of fellow British athlete and 1986 silver medalist Sarah Springman, while Chantal Malherbe of France took bronze.

== Medal summary ==
Event	Gold		Silver		Bronze	
Men's individual	Rob Barel; Netherlands	1:58:12	Philippe Méthion; France	2:01:03	Karel Blondeel; Belgium	2:01:22
Women's individual	Sarah Coope; Great Britain	2:17:03	Sarah Springman; Great Britain	2:20:30	Chantal Malherbe; France	2:22:21

== Medal table ==
* Host nation (France)

Rank	Nation	Gold	Silver	Bronze	Total
1	Great Britain (GBR)	1	1	0	2
2	Netherlands (NED)	1	0	0	1
3	France (FRA)	0	1	1	2
4	Belgium (BEL)	0	0	1	1
Totals (4 entries)		2	2	2	6
