= 2011 European Triathlon Championships =

2011 Europe Triathlon Championship
- Location: Spain, Pontevedra
- Date: 24-26 June 2011

The 2011 European Triathlon Championships was held in Pontevedra, Spain from 24 June to 26 June 2011.

== Medallists ==
Event	Gold		Silver		Bronze	
Elite
Men	Alistair Brownlee (GBR)	1:48:48	Jonathan Brownlee (GBR)	1:48:55	Dmitry Polyanskiy (RUS)	1:50:09
Women	Emmie Charayron (FRA)	2:04:00	Vendula Frintova (CZE)	2:05:27	Annamaria Mazzetti (ITA)	2:05:28
Mixed Relay	Germany	1:38:10	Ukraine	1:38:11	Italy	1:38:20
Junior
Men	Justus Nieschlag (GER)	0:59:09	Jelle Geens (BEL)	0:59:11	Matthias Steinwandter (ITA)	0:59:14
Women	Hanna Philippin (GER)	1:05:42	Eszter Dudás (HUN)	1:06:00	Eszter Pap (HUN)	1:06:01
Mixed Relay	United Kingdom	1:41:04	Germany	1:41:13	Belgium	1:41:21

== Results ==
=== Men's ===
Key

- # denotes the athlete's bib number for the event
- Swimming denotes the time it took the athlete to complete the swimming leg
- Cycling denotes the time it took the athlete to complete the cycling leg
- Running denotes the time it took the athlete to complete the running leg
- Difference denotes the time difference between the athlete and the event winner
- Lapped denotes that the athlete was lapped and removed from the course

Rank	#	Triathlete	Swimming	Cycling	Running	Total time	Difference
1st place, gold medalist(s)	2	Alistair Brownlee (GBR)	17:50	0:58:48	30:13	1:48:48	—
2nd place, silver medalist(s)	7	Jonathan Brownlee (GBR)	17:52	0:58:45	30:23	1:48:55	+00:07
3rd place, bronze medalist(s)	5	Dmitry Polyanskiy (RUS)	17:53	0:58:03	32:06	1:50:09	+01:21
4	11	Mario Mola (ESP)	18:55	0:58:45	31:38	1:50:16	+01:28
5	16	Alessandro Fabian (ITA)	17:47	0:58:03	31:48	1:50:23	+01:35
6	19	Joao Pereira (POR)	18:00	0:57:43	31:55	1:50:39	+01:51
7	6	Laurent Vidal (FRA)	18:04	0:58:46	32:14	1:50:53	+02:05
8	14	Danylo Sapunov (UKR)	18:26	0:58:42	32:10	1:50:55	+02:07
9	17	Tony Moulai (FRA)	18:24	0:58:32	32:24	1:51:02	+02:14
10	58	Yegor Martynenko (UKR)	19:03	0:58:12	32:22	1:51:03	+02:15
11	47	Daniel Hofer (ITA)	18:56	0:58:12	32:24	1:51:06	+02:18
12	23	Gregor Buchholz (GER)	19:14	0:57:36	32:23	1:51:10	+02:22
13	4	David Hauss (FRA)	18:00	0:57:43	32:31	1:51:12	+02:24
14	24	Jan Celustka (CZE)	18:19	0:57:27	32:22	1:51:14	+02:26
15	45	Oleksiy Syutkin (UKR)	18:54	0:58:35	32:31	1:51:17	+02:29
16	21	Bruno Pais (POR)	19:00	0:58:30	32:39	1:51:20	+02:32
17	39	Franz Loeschke (GER)	18:32	0:57:43	32:46	1:51:23	+02:35
18	18	Valentin Mechsheryakov (KAZ)	18:07	0:57:43	32:43	1:51:28	+02:40
19	29	Duarte Silva Marques (POR)	18:29	0:58:06	32:45	1:51:34	+02:46
20	28	Jan Van Berkel (SUI)	18:53	0:58:32	32:54	1:51:39	+02:51
21	22	Marek Jaskolka (POL)	18:53	0:58:15	33:00	1:51:41	+02:53
22	42	Todd Leckie (GBR)	18:55	0:57:45	33:44	1:51:45	+02:57
23	30	Reto Hug (SUI)	19:11	0:57:43	33:09	1:51:55	+03:07
24	27	Ramon Ejeda Medina (ESP)	19:09	0:57:01	33:19	1:52:05	+03:17
25	53	Sylwester Kuster (POL)	18:57	0:57:28	33:20	1:52:09	+03:21
Source: Official results

=== Women's ===
Key

- # denotes the athlete's bib number for the event
- Swimming denotes the time it took the athlete to complete the swimming leg
- Cycling denotes the time it took the athlete to complete the cycling leg
- Running denotes the time it took the athlete to complete the running leg
- Difference denotes the time difference between the athlete and the event winner
- Lapped denotes that the athlete was lapped and removed from the course

Rank	#	Triathlete	Swimming	Cycling	Running	Total time	Difference
1st place, gold medalist(s)	1	Emmie Charayron (FRA)	21:00	1:05:04	35:42	2:04:00	—
2nd place, silver medalist(s)	8	Vendula Frintova (CZE)	20:55	1:05:07	37:09	2:05:27	+01:27
3rd place, bronze medalist(s)	18	Annamaria Mazzetti (ITA)	20:57	1:05:09	37:08	2:05:28	+01:28
4	2	Ainhoa Murua Zubizarreta (ESP)	20:54	1:05:07	37:16	2:05:40	+01:40
5	11	Yuliya Yelistratova (UKR)	21:09	1:05:09	37:48	2:06:10	+02:10
6	12	Marina Damlaimcourt (ESP)	20:59	1:05:07	37:51	2:06:21	+02:21
7	21	Zsófia Kovács (HUN)	21:09	1:04:56	37:55	2:06:22	+02:22
8	32	Sarah Fladung (GER)	21:14	1:05:04	38:02	2:06:27	+02:27
9	4	Helle Frederiksen (DEN)	20:53	1:05:03	38:07	2:06:29	+02:29
10	9	Jodie Stimpson (GBR)	20:13	1:04:56	38:16	2:06:41	+02:41
11	25	Irina Abysova (RUS)	20:42	1:05:11	38:17	2:06:50	+02:50
12	34	Hollie Avil (GBR)	21:13	1:05:50	38:39	2:07:05	+03:05
13	19	Katrien Verstuyft (BEL)	21:04	1:05:20	38:51	2:07:14	+03:14
14	5	Aileen Reid (IRL)	20:16	1:04:52	39:04	2:07:27	+03:27
15	31	Paulina Kotfica (POL)	21:13	1:05:02	39:04	2:07:34	+03:34
16	20	Radka Vodickova (CZE)	20:56	1:05:46	39:17	2:07:38	+03:38
17	28	Non Stanford (GBR)	20:59	1:04:59	39:30	2:07:53	+03:53
18	17	Ricarda Lisk (GER)	21:00	1:05:07	39:46	2:08:05	+04:05
19	35	Mariya Shorets (RUS)	20:48	1:05:05	39:43	2:08:10	+04:10
20	23	Sarissa De Vries (NED)	20:14	1:05:00	39:58	2:08:23	+04:23
21	33	Charlotte Bonin (ITA)	21:03	1:05:15	40:07	2:08:40	+04:40
22	43	Maria Pujol (ESP)	21:07	1:05:54	40:43	2:09:07	+05:07
23	49	Camilla Pedersen (DEN)	20:59	1:05:03	40:47	2:09:13	+05:13
24	7	Maria Czesnik (POL)	21:21	1:04:56	40:03	2:09:19	+05:19
25	53	Lois Rosindale (GBR)	21:14	1:05:02	40:54	2:09:24	+05:24
Source: Official results
