= Chloe Cook =

British triathlete

Personal information
- Full name: Chloe Cook
- Nationality: British
- Born: 1994 (age 31–32) Eastbourne

Sport
- Country: Great Britain
- Sport: Triathlon
- Club: Team Bodyworks
- Coached by: Glenn Cook
Medal record
Representing United Kingdom
Women's Triathlon

Chloe Cook (born 1994) is a British professional triathlete.

== Career ==
Cook competes at sprint, standard and Ironman 70.3 distances. Her highest placed results to date in the ITU came at the 2015 Burgas and 2017 Tartu ETU Sprint Triathlon European Cups, finishing second in both races.

In 2019 she competed at the 70.3 Ironman Staffordshire, placing 4th female behind Lucy Charles-Barclay, Emma Pallant and Katrina Matthews (nee Rye) with a time of 4:30:20. She came out of the water in second place, maintained this position off the bike through T2 but then lost ground to Pallant and Matthews, with Pallant recording the fastest run split to take second place.

== Personal life ==
Cook's parents are Sarah Coope and Glenn Cook, both former professional triathletes. Cook has three younger sisters, Ysabel, grace and Beth. her youngest sister, Beth, has had a number of successes in triathlon as a junior.

ITU Results

Date	Position	Event	Classification	Time
2019-08-18	8	2019 Kecskemét ETU Sprint Triathlon European Cup	Elite Women	00:58:59
2017-08-05	9	2017 Malmö ETU Sprint Triathlon European Cup	Elite Women	01:02:44
2017-07-22	15	2017 Tiszaujvaros ITU Triathlon World Cup	Semifinal 1 Elite Women	01:03:15
2017-07-09	2	2017 Tartu ETU Sprint Triathlon European Cup	Elite Women	01:01:53
2016-06-18	DNF	2016 Burgas ETU Triathlon U23 European Championships	U23 Women	DNS
2016-05-08	17	2016 Cagliari ITU Triathlon World Cup	Elite Women	01:06:24
2015-09-18	8	2015 ITU World Triathlon Grand Final Chicago	U23 Women	01:05:26
2015-08-08	14	2015 Tiszaujvaros ITU Triathlon World Cup	Semifinal 2 Elite Women	01:01:39
2015-08-08	25	2015 Tiszaujvaros ITU Triathlon World Cup	Elite Women	01:03:39
2015-07-25	10	2015 Banyoles ETU Triathlon U23 and Youth European Championships	U23 Women	02:01:55
2015-06-21	2	2015 Burgas ETU Sprint Triathlon European Cup	Elite Women	01:01:49
2015-04-25	16	2015 Alcobendas ETU Sprint and Standard Distance Duathlon European Championships	Elite Women	02:16:31
2015-04-25	4	2015 Alcobendas ETU Sprint and Standard Distance Duathlon European Championships	U23 Women	02:16:31
2015-03-29	3	2015 GBR Sprint Duathlon National Championships	Elite Women	00:37:27
