= 2019 European Triathlon Championships =

- Host city: Weert
- Country: Netherlands
- Events: 3

The 2019 European Triathlon Championships was held in Weert, Netherlands from 30 May to 2 June 2019.

== Medal overview ==
| Event | Gold | Silver | Bronze |
|---|---|---|---|
| Men | Alistair Brownlee; Great Britain | João Pereira; Portugal | Jelle Geens; Belgium |
| Women | Beth Potter; Great Britain | Sandra Dodet; France | Claire Michel; Belgium |
| Mixed Relay | France; Sandra Dodet; Paul Georgenthum; Emilie Morier; Léo Bergère | Germany; Nina Eim; Jonas Breinlinger; Caroline Pohle; Justus Nieschlag | Netherlands; Maya Kingmat; Marco van der Stel; Rachel Klamer; Jorik van Egdom |

== Medal table ==
| Rank | Nation | Gold | Silver | Bronze | Total |
|---|---|---|---|---|---|
| 1 | Great Britain (GBR) | 2 | 0 | 0 | 2 |
| 2 | France (FRA) | 1 | 1 | 0 | 2 |
| 3 | Germany (GER) | 0 | 1 | 0 | 1 |
| 3 | Portugal (POR) | 0 | 1 | 0 | 1 |
| 5 | Belgium (BEL) | 0 | 0 | 2 | 2 |
| 6 | Netherlands (NED) | 0 | 0 | 1 | 1 |
| Totals (6 entries) | | 3 | 3 | 3 | 9 |
