= Nadia Cortassa =

Italian triathlete (born 1978)

- Born: 5 January 1978 (age 48); Turin
- Occupation: Triathlon

Nadia Cortassa (born 5 January 1978 in Turin) is an athlete from Italy. She competes in triathlon.

Cortassa competed at the second Olympic triathlon at the 2004 Summer Olympics. She took fifth place with a total time of 2:05:45.35.
