= Jelle Geens =

Belgian triathlete (born 1993)

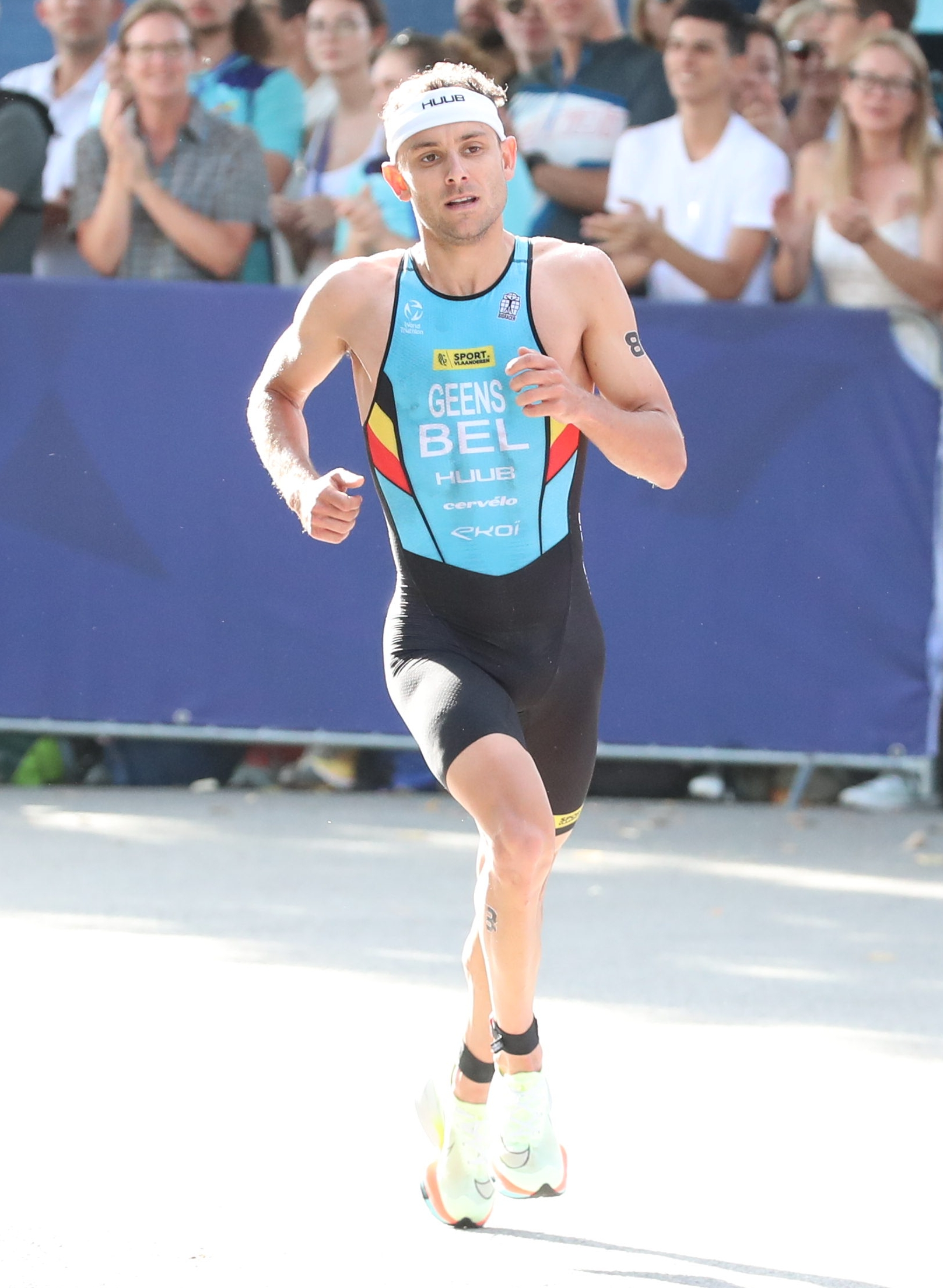
- Geens at Munich 2022

Personal information
- Born: 26 March 1993 (age 33) Zolder, Limburg, Belgium
- Education: Groep T, Leuven
- Height: 172 cm (5 ft 8 in)
- Weight: 61 kg (134 lb)

Sport
- Country: Belgium
- Sport: Triathlon
- Club: Leie Triathlon Team Deinze
- Coached by: Stijn Goris; Nick Baleus
Medal record
Men's triathlon
Representing Belgium
ITU World Triathlon Series
Gold medal – first place	2019 Montreal	Individual
Bronze medal – third place	2019 Hamburg	Individual
ITU Triathlon World Cup
Gold medal – first place	2018 Antwerp	Individual
Silver medal – second place	2018 Sarasota-Bradenton	Individual
Silver medal – second place	2019 Miyazaki	Individual
European Championships
Bronze medal – third place	2018 Glasgow	Mixed team relay
Bronze medal – third place	2019 Weert	Individual
Ironman 70.3 World Championship
Gold medal – first place	2024 Taupō	Individual
Gold medal – first place	2025 Marbella	Individual

Jelle Geens (born 26 March 1993) is a Belgian triathlete. Geens placed 38th at the 2016 Olympics. Two years later he won a bronze medal in the mixed team relay event at the 2018 European Triathlon Championships.

In 2024, Geens won the Ironman 70.3 World Championship in Taupō, passing Olympic silver medallist Hayden Wilde with three kilometres to go. In 2025, Geens won the Ironman 70.3 World Championship in Marbella, in a head-to-head duel with Kristian Blummenfelt.

== Career ==
In June 2014 Geens finished fourth in the Triathlon European Championships Under-23 in Penza, Russia.

In May 2015 at the Belgian Triathlon Championships around the Eau d'Heure lakes in Wallonia Geens won his first national title at the senior level in the Olympic distance. In July, he finished seventeenth at the 2015 European Triathlon Championships in Geneva, Switzerland. In September, he finished in eight place at the 2015 ITU World Triathlon Series final in Chicago.

In May 2016 Geens earned his first World Cup (World Triathlon's second-tier competition) podium finishing second in Huatulco, Mexico. He placed 38th at the 2016 Olympics. In September, just like the year before, he finished in eight place at the 2016 ITU World Triathlon Series final in Cozumel, Mexico. Towards the end of 2016, Geens suffered a stress fracture that would keep him out of competition for the better part of the next 10 months.

In August 2017, upon his return from injury after a ten month absence, Geens achieved his best ever result at the highest level finishing sixth in the 2017 ITU World Triathlon Series event in Montreal, Canada. In October, he was victorious at the European Cup final in Melilla, Spain.

In June 2018, Geens claimed his first ever ITU World Cup victory, winning on home soil in Antwerp, Belgium. In August he participated in the 2018 European Triathlon Championships in Glasgow, United Kingdom finishing fifth in the individual men's race and taking the bronze medal with the Belgium team in the mixed team relay.

In June 2019, Geens won the bronze medal at the Olympic distance in the individual men's elite race at the 2019 European Triathlon Championships in Weert, The Netherlands. Also in June, he booked his first ever win on the World Triathlon Championship Series by winning the Groupe Copley World Triathlon Montreal becoming the first Belgian on top of the podium in the WTS history. One week later, he grabbed another WTS podium finishing third in Hamburg Wasser Triathlon. In August, he participated at the Olympic test event in Tokyo finishing nineteenth.

== Personal life ==
Geens studied industrial engineering at Groep T in Leuven, Belgium.
