= Ana Burgos =

Spanish triathlete

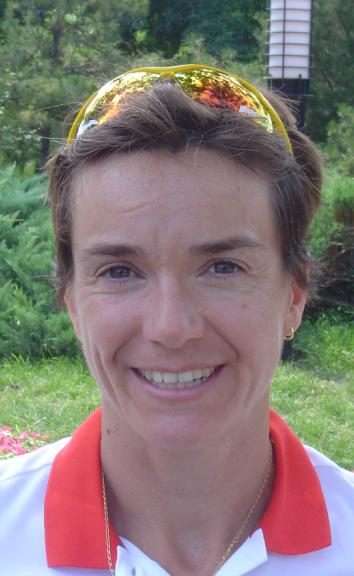
- Burgos at the 2008 Summer Olympics.
Medal record
Women's Triathlon
Representing Spain
Duathlon European Championships
Silver medal – second place	2006 Rimini	Duathlon

Ana Burgos Acuña (born December 26, 1967) is a triathlete from Spain. She was born in Madrid.

Burgos participated in the second Olympic triathlon at the 2004 Summer Olympics. She took seventh place with a total time of 2:06:02.36. She won the silver medal at the 2006 ITU Duathlon European Championship
