= Xavier Llobet =

Spanish triathlete

Xavier Llobet Sallent (born May 16, 1974 in Manresa, Catalonia) is a Catalan triathlete.

Llobet competed in the second Olympic triathlon at the 2004 Summer Olympics. He did not finish the competition. His runs for Club Triatló Manresa
