= Zita Szabó =

Hungarian triathlete

Personal information
- Full name: Zita Livia Szabó
- Nickname: Zitten
- Born: 13 November 1975 (age 50) Karcag, Hungary
- Height: 1.64 m (5 ft 5 in)
- Weight: 51 kg (112 lb)

Sport
- Country: Hungary
- Club: Debreceni SK
- Coached by: Zsolt Papp

Zita Livia Szabó (born November 13, 1975, in Karcag) is a triathlete from Hungary, who competed at the 2008 Summer Olympics in Beijing.

Szabó started out as a swimmer, until she began with triathlon in a local school at the age of eleven. She claimed the bronze medal at the 1991 European Youth Triathlon Championships in Germany, and reached into the international junior level at the 1992 ITU Triathlon World Championships in Huntsville, Alabama. Following her first major competition, Szabó won her first title at the national triathlon championship in Szombathely, but she decided to stop her career in order to pursue her college education, and obtained the bachelor's degree in Computer Science. Szabó returned to her sporting career in 1998, when she competed at the FISU World University Triathlon Championships in Kiel, Germany.

Between 2003 and 2004, Szabó took part in six ITU Triathlon World Cup competitions under an elite category, and had achieved two top-ten finishes to guarantee her place for the Summer Olympics in Athens, but missed out of the games after suffering a serious physical injury. She continued to improve further on her personal best in triathlon by placing third at the 2006 ITU Triathlon Premium European Cup in Eilat, Israel, and eighth at the 2008 ITU Triathlon World Cup in Tiszaújváros. Szabó's best result at the latter competition made her eligible to qualify for the 2008 Summer Olympics in Beijing, where she placed thirty-eighth in the women's triathlon with a time of 2:06:46.

Before her triathlon career ended, Szabó had won the bronze medal at the 2009 ITU Triathlon European Cup in Karlovy Vary, Czech Republic, and silver at the ITU Triathlon African Cup in Pretoria, South Africa.
