= Wieke Hoogzaad =

Dutch triathlete

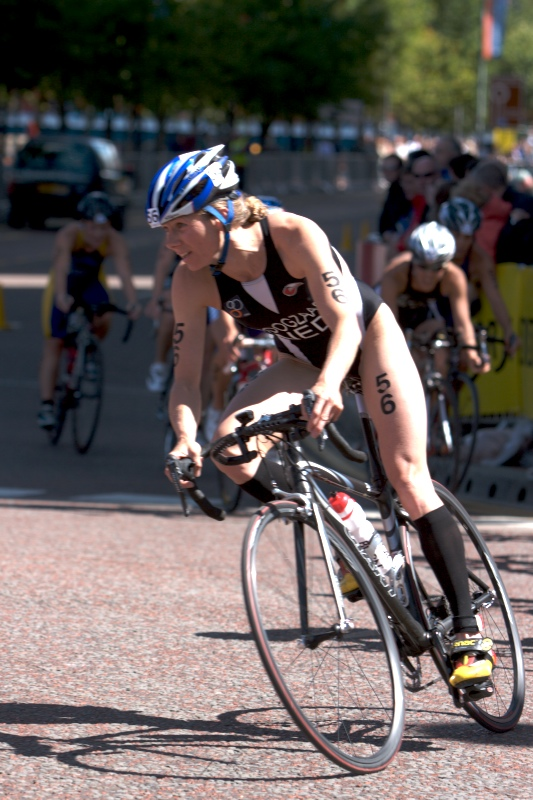
Wieke Hoogzaad

Ludowieka ("Wieke") Victoria Hoogzaad (born 29 June 1970, in Dordrecht) is an athlete from the Netherlands, who is nicknamed Wiki de Viking. She competes in triathlon.

Hoogzaad competed at the first Olympic triathlon at the 2000 Summer Olympics. She took twenty-fifth place with a total time of 2:06:45.48. Four years later, Hoogzaad again took twenty-fifth place. Her time at the 2004 Summer Olympics was 2:09:47.21.
