= Natascha Badmann =

Swiss triathlete

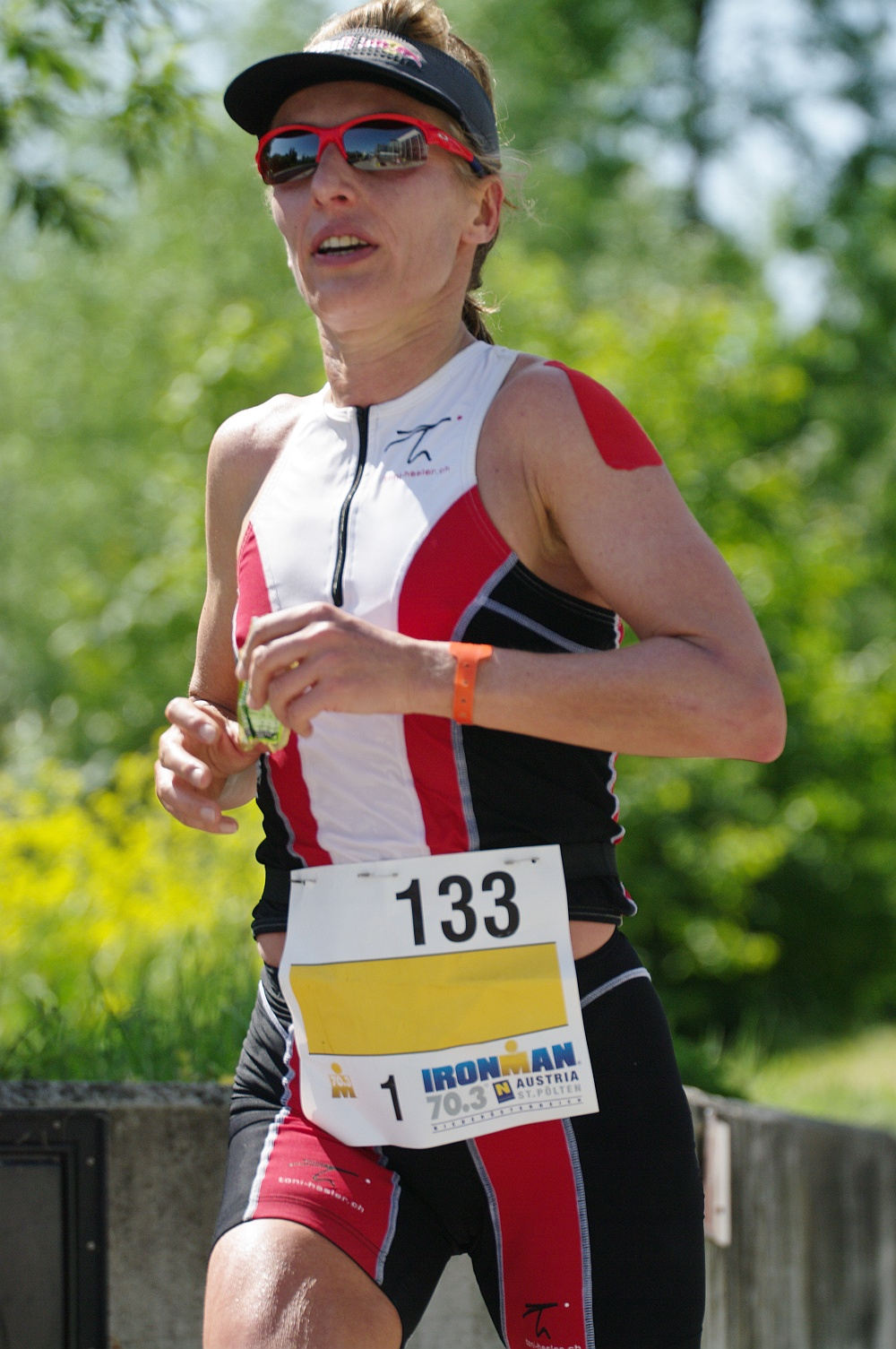
- Natascha Badmann competing in 2012 at Ironman 70.3 Austria

Personal information
- Nicknames: Swiss Miss; Natasches ("Too fast") "The Smile"
- Born: 6 December 1966 (age 59) Basel, Switzerland
- Height: 1.65 m (5 ft 5 in)
- Weight: 52 kg (115 lb)

Sport
- Country: Switzerland
- Turned pro: 1995
- Coached by: Toni Hasler

Achievements and titles
- Personal best: 9:07:54 (2002)
Medal record
Representing Switzerland
Women's triathlon
Ironman World Championship
Gold medal – first place	1998 Kailua-Kona	Elite
Gold medal – first place	2000 Kailua-Kona	Elite
Gold medal – first place	2001 Kailua-Kona	Elite
Gold medal – first place	2002 Kailua-Kona	Elite
Gold medal – first place	2004 Kailua-Kona	Elite
Gold medal – first place	2005 Kailua-Kona	Elite
Silver medal – second place	1996 Kailua-Kona	Elite
Silver medal – second place	2003 Kailua-Kona	Elite

Natascha Badmann (born 6 December 1966) is a professional triathlete from Switzerland. She is a 6-time winner of the Ironman World Championships in Kailua-Kona, Hawaii in 1998, 2000, 2001, 2002, 2004, and 2005; in 1998 she became the first European woman to win the Ironman Triathlon World Championship.

Natascha works in Switzerland as a social worker, and speaks German, English, French, and Italian. She currently lives in Winznau, Switzerland with her husband Toni and daughter Anastasia.

Her daughter Anastasia was born days before she turned 18. Nicknamed the "Swiss Miss", Badmann won her first Ironman World Championship at the age of 29, when her daughter was already 13 years old. Her husband, coach and nutritionist is Toni Hasler.

At the 2007 Hawaii Ironman, Badmann hit a cone on the bike leg and injured her shoulder and collarbone. While she wanted to continue the race, Hasler convinced her to drop out to prevent further injury. At the same race in 2006, stomach problems nearly caused her to drop out again. Early into the run, Badmann stopped and threw up. Struggling to continue, she began to walk. In a dramatic moment with tremendous support from cheering fans, Badmann, crying, began jogging. She finished 10th with a personal-worst marathon time of 3:27:54.

Though she finished second on the course of the 2004 Ironman Triathlon World Championship, Badmann is considered the winner of the race due to the disqualification of the initial winner, Germany's Nina Kraft, after Kraft admitted to using the banned performance enhancer EPO.

== Ranking list ==
Table below gives major significant ranking podium) obtained from International Championship triathlon since 1994.

Year	Competition	Country	Position	Timing
2014	Swiss Ironman (fr)	Switzerland	2nd place, silver medalist(s)	9h 28' 37"
2012	South Africa Ironman (fr)	South Africa	1st place, gold medalist(s)	9h 47' 10"
2012	Ironman 70.3 Asia-Pacific	Australia	2nd place, silver medalist(s)	4h 30' 42"
2012	Ironman 70.3 Austria	Austria	3rd place, bronze medalist(s)	4h 24' 24"
2011	Ironman 70.3 Germany	Germany	3rd place, bronze medalist(s)	4h 51' 39"
2011	Ironman Lanzarote	Spain	2nd place, silver medalist(s)	9h 43' 39"
2007	South Africa Ironman (fr)	South Africa	1st place, gold medalist(s)	9h 22' 0"
2006	South Africa Ironman (fr)	South Africa	1st place, gold medalist(s)	9h 46' 38"
2005	World Championship Ironman in Kailua-Kona	United States	1st place, gold medalist(s)	9h 9' 30"
2005	South Africa Ironman (fr)	South Africa	1st place, gold medalist(s)	9h 23' 51"
2004	World Championship Ironman in Kailua-Kona	United States	1st place, gold medalist(s)	9h 50' 4"
2003	World Championship Ironman in Kailua-Kona	United States	2nd place, silver medalist(s)	9h 17' 8"
2002	World Championship Ironman in Kailua-Kona	United States	1st place, gold medalist(s)	9h 7' 54"
2001	Ironman California	United States	1st place, gold medalist(s)	9h 18' 49"
2001	World Championship Ironman in Kailua-Kona	United States	1st place, gold medalist(s)	9h 28' 37"
2000	World Championship Ironman in Kailua-Kona	United States	1st place, gold medalist(s)	9h 26' 16"
2000	Long Distance World Championships	France	2nd place, silver medalist(s)	7h 5' 44"
1998	World Championship Ironman in Kailua-Kona	United States	1st place, gold medalist(s)	9h 24' 16"
1997	European Championships	Finland	1st place, gold medalist(s)	2h 13' 34"
1997	Long Distance Duathlon World Championships	Switzerland	1st place, gold medalist(s)	7h 11' 3"
1996	World Championship Ironman in Kailua-Kona	United States	2nd place, silver medalist(s)	9h 11' 19"
1995	European Championships	Sweden	2nd place, silver medalist(s)	2h 1' 12"
1995	Duathlon Worldwide Championships	Mexico	1st place, gold medalist(s)	Timing
1994	Duathlon Worldwide Championships	Australia	2nd place, silver medalist(s)	Timing

== Notes ==
Awards
Preceded by (Switzerland) Martina Hingis	Swiss Sportswoman of the Year; 1998	Succeeded by (Switzerland) Anita Weyermann
Preceded by (Switzerland) Sonja Nef	Swiss Sportswoman of the Year; 2002	Succeeded by (Switzerland) Simone Niggli-Luder
