= Mieke Suys =

Belgian triathlete

Personal information
- Born: 15 February 1968 (age 57); Ghent, Belgium

Sport
- Country: Belgium

Mieke ("Mickey") Suys (born 15 February 1968 in Ghent) is an athlete from Belgium who competes in triathlon. Suys competed at the first Olympic triathlon at the 2000 Summer Olympics. She did not finish the competition.

Four years later, at the 2004 Summer Olympics, Suys competed again. Her time of 2:09:12.57 placed her twenty-second in the event.
