= Sonja Oberem =

German marathon runner

Sonja Oberem (née Krolik; born 24 February 1973 in Rheydt) is a German athlete, who specialized in the marathon races. In her younger days she was a successful triathlete.

== Achievements ==
Year	Competition	Venue	Position	Event	Notes
Representing Germany
1994	Berlin Marathon	Berlin, Germany	5th	Marathon	2:26:53
1995	World Championships	Gothenburg, Sweden	8th	Marathon	2:32:17
1996	Boston Marathon	Boston, United States	4th	Marathon	2:29:24
1996	Olympic Games	Atlanta, United States	8th	Marathon	2:31:16
1997	London Marathon	London, United Kingdom	4th	Marathon	2:28:02
1997	World Championships	Athens, Greece	7th	Marathon	2:35:28
1998	London Marathon	London, United Kingdom	6th	Marathon	2:29:39
1998	European Championships	Budapest, Hungary	12th	Marathon	2:32:36
1998	Amsterdam Marathon	Amsterdam, Netherlands	2nd	Marathon	2:29:30
1999	World Championships	Seville, Spain	9th	Marathon	2:28:55
2000	Osaka International Ladies Marathon	Osaka, Japan	8th	Marathon	2:31:03
2000	Vienna Marathon	Vienna, Austria	3rd	Marathon	2:27:25
2000	Olympic Games	Sydney, Australia	24th	Marathon	2:33:45
2001	Osaka International Ladies Marathon	Osaka, Japan	4th	Marathon	2:28:50
2001	Hamburg Marathon	Hamburg, Germany	1st	Marathon	2:26:13
2001	World Championships	Edmonton, Canada	5th	Marathon	2:28:17
2001	Athens Classic Marathon	Athens, Greece	1st	Marathon	2:36:15
2002	Hamburg Marathon	Hamburg, Germany	1st	Marathon	2:26:20
2002	European Championships	Munich, Germany	3rd	Marathon	2:28:45
2002	Athens Classic Marathon	Athens, Greece	1st	Marathon	2:37:29
2004	Vienna Marathon	Vienna, Austria	3rd	Marathon	2:30:58
2004	Berlin Marathon	Berlin, Germany	3rd	Marathon	2:26:53
2006	Cologne Marathon	Cologne, Germany	4th	Marathon	2:48:00
2006	Berlin Marathon	Berlin, Germany	—	Marathon	DNF
2008	Düsseldorf Marathon	Düsseldorf, Germany	6th	Marathon	2:46:58
2009	Düsseldorf Marathon	Düsseldorf, Germany	3rd	Marathon	2:43:49

=== Personal bests ===
- Half Marathon - 1:10:13 hrs (1996)
- Marathon - 2:26:13 hrs (2001)
