= Spencer Smith (triathlete) =

British triathlete (born 1973)

Personal information
- Born: 11 May 1973 (age 53) Hounslow, Middlesex, United Kingdom
Medal record
Men's Triathlon
Representing Great Britain
ITU Triathlon World Championships
Gold medal – first place	1993 Manchester	Elite
Gold medal – first place	1994 Wellington	Elite
European Triathlon Championships
Gold medal – first place	1992	Elite
Gold medal – first place	1997	Elite
ITU Long Distance World Championships
Bronze medal – third place	1996 Muncie	Elite

Spencer Smith is a British triathlete who won ITU Triathlon World Championships in 1993 and 1994.

== Athletic career ==
Smith moved on from short course Olympic-distance racing to long course and has competed in a number of full Ironman and half-iron distance races following his short course career. He finished 5th at the Ironman World Championship in Kona, Hawaii, in 1998, and 8th in 2000. He won two Ironman Distance races: Ironman Florida in 2001 and Ironman Brazil in 2002.

In 1998, Smith was accused of using the banned substance nandrolone. After a long and costly case, he was exonerated after 17 months. During the Court of Arbitration for Sport hearing in New York it was found that the Los Angeles testing laboratory had made an error. After clearing his name against the doping allegation, Smith rode for the now-defunct British professional cycling team, Linda McCartney Racing Team.

Smith was recognized by the British Triathlon Federation (BTF) for his outstanding contribution to the sport, and was awarded the BTF Golden Pin.

Since retiring as a professional athlete Smith operates a multi-sport athlete and triathlon coaching company called S2Coaching.

== Triathlon titles ==
Smith's list of triathlon titles include:

- ITU World Triathlon Champion
  - 1993
  - 1994
- ITU World Triathlon Junior Champion
  - 1992
- ETU European Triathlon Champion
  - 1992
  - 1997
- BTA British Triathlon Champion
  - 1991
  - 1992
  - 1993
  - 1994
