= Sarah Coope =

British triathlete

Personal information
- Full name: Sarah Coope
- Nationality: British

Sport
- Country: Great Britain
- Sport: Triathlon
- Partner: Glenn Cook
Medal record
Representing United Kingdom
Women's Triathlon
ETU Triathlon Championships
Gold medal – first place	ETU European Championships	1987 Marseille
ETU European Middle Distance Triathlon Championships
Gold medal – first place	ETU Middle Distance Triathlon Championships	1987 Roth
Gold medal – first place	ETU Middle Distance Triathlon Championships	1988 Stein
Silver medal – second place	ETU Middle Distance Triathlon Championships	1986 Brasschaat
ETU Long Distance Triathlon Championships
Gold medal – first place	ETU Long Distance Triathlon Championships	1987 Joroinen
Gold medal – first place	ETU Long Distance Triathlon Championships	1989 Rodekro
Bronze medal – third place	ETU Triathlon Championships	1987 Milton Keynes
ETU Duathlon Championships
Gold medal – first place	ETU Duathlon Championships	1991 Birmingham
Ironman World Championships
Bronze medal – third place	Ironman World Championships	1991 Hawaii

Sarah Coope is a British former professional triathlete and current triathlon coach.

== Triathlon career ==
From 1985 to 1989 Coope competed in eight European Triathlon Union (ETU). sanctioned races, before participating in the inaugural International Triathlon Union (ITU) Triathlon World Championships in Avignon, placing 12th. She was one of two British female triathletes at the race, with her compatriot Cathy Bow finishing 24th.

She went on to compete internationally until 1992, and is considered the most victorious British triathlete of the 1980s, taking the title of ETU European Triathlon Champion five times at three different distances, standard, middle and long.

She also became the European duathlon champion in 1991.

She moved to long-course triathlon in the latter years of her career, placing third woman overall at the 1991 Ironman World Championships in Kailua-Kona, Hawaii.

== Post triathlon career ==
Coope now runs a coaching business in Eastbourne, Team Bodyworks, with her partner Glenn Cook, a fellow former triathlete, Team GB coach and Olympic selector.

== Personal life ==
Coope lives with her partner in Eastbourne.

They have four daughters together: Chloe Cook is a professional triathlete competing within the ITU and at Ironman 70.3 distances, Ysabel cook, Grace cook and her younger sister Beth is also an aspiring triathlete with a number of successes in the junior ranks.
