= Sarah Springman =

British-Swiss triathlete, civil engineer, and academic

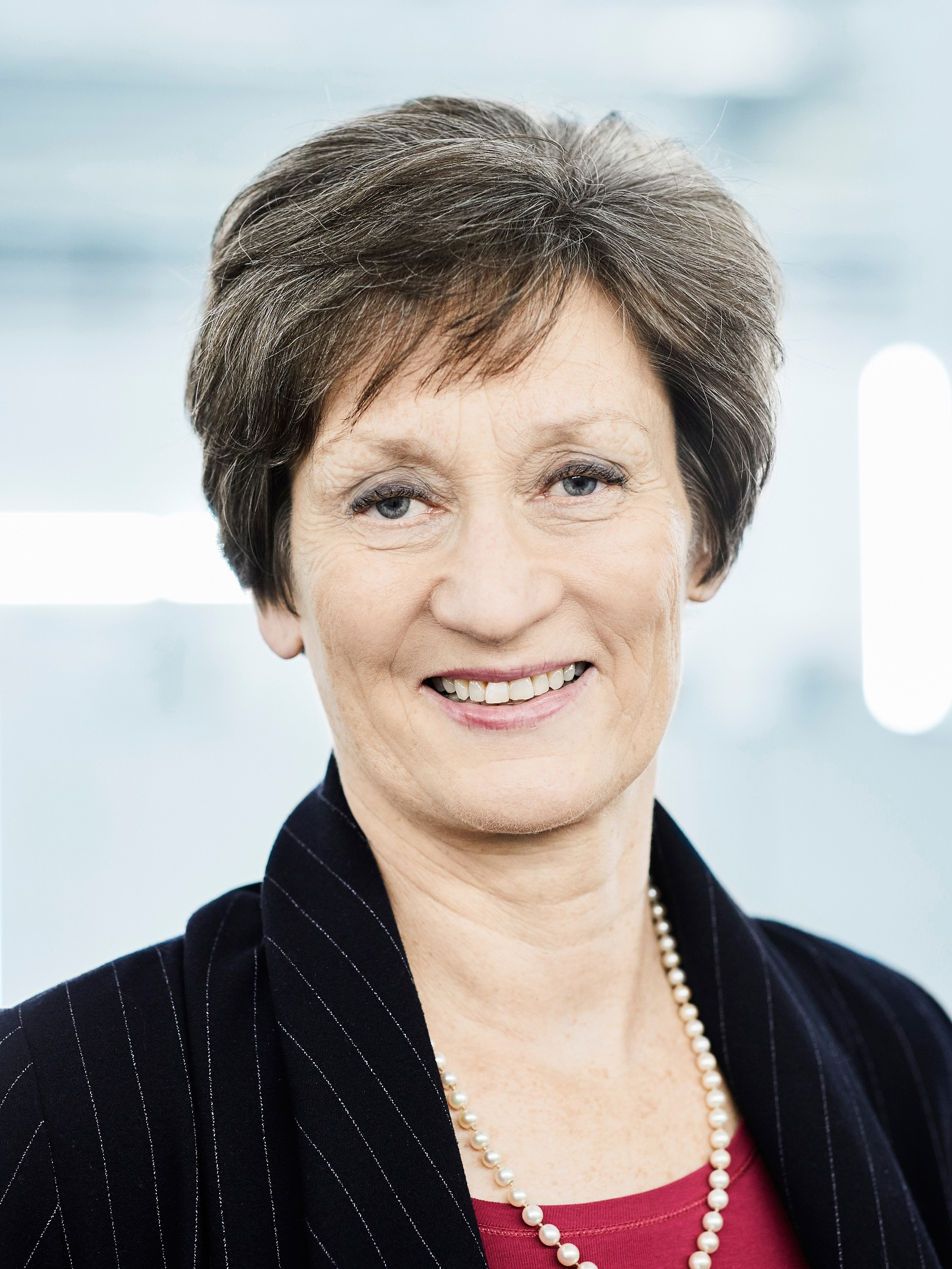
Sarah Springman (2019)

Dame Sarah Marcella Springman DBE FREng MA mult. MPhil PhD Dr. h.c. mult. CEng FICE FInstRE FWES MASCE (born 26 December 1956) is a British-Swiss triathlete, civil engineer, and academic. She was educated in England and spent much of her career in Switzerland. She is a former rector of the Swiss Federal Institute of Technology in Zurich and currently Principal of St Hilda's College at the University of Oxford.

== Early life, education and family ==
Born in London in 1956, Springman was educated at Wycombe Abbey, where she was later a governor from 1993 to 1996. She studied for a BA degree in engineering sciences at Girton College, Cambridge, from 1975 to 1978, and completed a MPhil in soil mechanics at St Catharine's College in 1983. She carried on her doctoral research in soil-structure interaction, this time at Magdalene College, Cambridge, earning her doctorate between 1984 and 1989. From 1979 to 1983, she worked as an engineer on geotechnical projects in England, Australia, and Fiji (primarily on the Monasavu Dam in Viti Levu), before she became a chartered engineer and Member of the Institution of Civil Engineers in 1983. She is married to Rosie Mayglothling.

== Academic career ==
Springman was a doctoral student in the Soil Mechanics Group at Cambridge University, and was supervised initially by Mark F. Randolph, until he moved to the University of Western Australia in 1985, who was succeeded by Malcolm Bolton. She was the first female research fellow at Magdalene College, Cambridge, before becoming a university lecturer in 1990. She has been professor of geotechnical engineering at ETH Zürich since 1997, and was the Deputy Head of the Department of Civil, Environmental and Geomatic Engineering from 2013 to 2014. She became Rector of ETH Zürich on 1 January 2015, only the second woman to hold this position since the founding of ETH in 1855.

Supported by various funds to introduce computer-aided learning at ETH Zurich, she worked with Les Davison from the University of Western England to improve opportunities for teaching and learning of soil mechanics through the Computer Aided Learning in Civil Engineering (CALICE) project (1999-2006), which was shortlisted for a Medida Prix award in 2002. CALICE was redesigned and extended to become the GeoTechnical Information Platform (GeoTIP) (2005-2020).

The emphasis of Springman's research is on geotechnical modelling of soil structure interaction problems, including design and construction of abutments, pile foundations, reinforced soil, and ground improvement of soft and sensitive soils (e.g. sand compaction piles, dynamic compaction). Springman combines physical modelling in a geotechnical centrifuge with numerical modelling so that the data may be used to develop, calibrate or validate new design methods. At ETH Zürich, her group uses a 2.2-metre (7 ft) drum geotechnical centrifuge to carry out practical studies on a range of geotechnical problems.

Springman is an advocate for access for women to STEM / MINT studies and engages in many events and campaigns to support this.

In March 2021, it was announced that Springman would be the next Principal of St Hilda's College, Oxford, in succession to Sir Gordon Duff. She took up the position on 1 February 2022. In June 2022, she gave a farewell lecture at the ETH in Zurich.

== Sporting career ==
In addition to being a civil engineer, she represented Great Britain at the elite level in triathlon from 1984 to 1993, competing in the demonstration triathlon in the 1990 Commonwealth Games in Auckland, New Zealand, and winning twenty elite European Triathlon Union (ETU) Championship medals in triathlon and duathlon.

She was vice-president of the International Triathlon Union (ITU) from 1992 to 1996, during which time, she played an important role in getting triathlon into the Olympics and establishing it as a recognised sport for the Commonwealth Games. She was the inaugural president of the British Triathlon Federation in 2007 and completed her term on 31 December 2012. She stepped down after celebrating Team GB's first triathlon medals won at an Olympic Games. She was awarded the Lifetime Achievement Award at the Sunday Times and Sky Sports Sportswomen of the Year Awards in London in 2012.

She was a member of the International Olympic Committee's Sustainability and Legacy Commission from 2015 until 2022. On 18 August 2016, she was chosen as a presentation official at the Olympic triathlon medal ceremony, at which brothers Alistair and Jonathan Brownlee received gold and silver medals for Team GB in Rio de Janeiro. The International Triathlon Union named her to their Hall of Fame in 2019.

She started rowing in 1994 as part of a Women's Rowing Development Project, sponsored by the ARA (now British Rowing), which was based at Thames Tradesmen Rowing Club, coached by Douglas Parnham. Subsequently, she has won medals at the British Rowing Championships for Rob Roy Boat Club in the single and quad sculls and in the Swiss National Rowing Championships for Belvoir RC (Zurich) in the single, quad sculls and women's eight and in European and World Masters Championships in various boat classes. She is a three-time winner of the Masters CRASH-B World Indoor Rowing sprints over 2000m, and holds World and British indoor rowing records in the 60-69 age group.

== Honours and awards ==
Springman was appointed Officer of the Order of the British Empire (OBE) in 1997, Commander of the Order of the British Empire (CBE) in 2012 and Dame Commander of the Order of the British Empire (DBE) in the 2022 New Year Honours for services to engineering and international sports administration. She holds honorary doctorates from the Universities of Bath, Berne, Ghent, Sheffield, Strathclyde and Wollongong, Australia, and is an honorary fellow of all three of her Cambridge colleges.

- 2000–2008: Member of Schweizerischer Wissenschafts- und Technologierat and ETH Planungskommission.
- 2009: Fellow of the Royal Academy of Engineering
- 2013: Lifetime Achievement Award at the Sunday Times and Sky Sports Sportswomen of the Year Awards
- 2025: Karl Terzaghi Lecture

== Publications ==
- Physical Modelling in Geotechnics (Proc. 7th Int. Conference, ICPMG, Zürich), CRC Press 2010, ISBN .
- P. W. Mayne, M. R. Coop, Sarah Springman, A. B. Huang, J. Zornberg State of the Art Paper: GeoMaterial Behavior and Testing, Proc. 17. ICSMGE, Volume 4, Mill Press/IOS Press, Rotterdam 2009, ISBN .
- Sarah Springman, Phillips, Arenson: Permafrost, Swets und Zeitlinger 2003, ISBN .
- Constitutive and Centrifuge Modelling – two Extremes, Taylor and Francis 2002, ISBN .
