= Thomas Hellriegel =

German triathlete

Medal record

Representing Germany

Men's triathlon

Ironman World Championship
| Gold medal – first place | 1997 | Men's race |
| Silver medal – second place | 1995 | Men's race |
| Silver medal – second place | 1996 | Men's race |
| Bronze medal – third place | 2001 | Men's race |

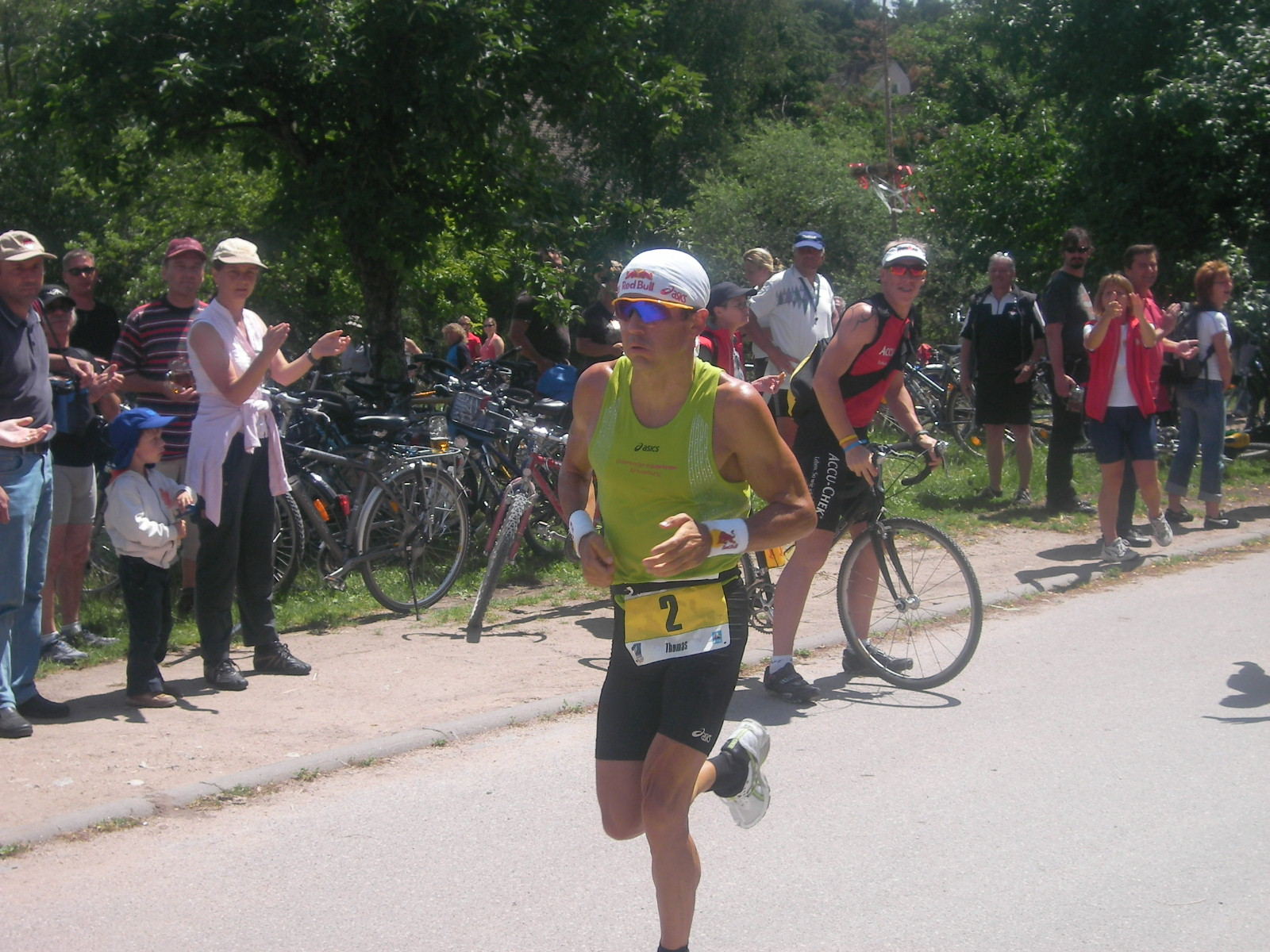
Thomas Hellriegel.

Thomas Hellriegel (born 14 January 1971) a.k.a. "Hell on Wheels" is a German Ironman triathlete. His biggest achievement is winning the 1997 Ironman World Championship. Hellriegel was also second in the event in 1995 (to Mark Allen) and 1996 (to Luc Van Lierde).

Hellriegel set the bike course record at the 1996 championship race with a time of 4:24:50; which had stood for 11 years, until Normann Stadler finished the bike course in a new record time at 4:18:23.
