= Olivier Marceau =

French triathlete

Medal record

Men's triathlon

Representing France

ITU Triathlon World Championships
Gold medal – first place	2000 Perth	Individual

Representing Switzerland

ITU Triathlon World Championships
Bronze medal – third place	2003 Queenstown	Individual

Olivier Marceau (born 30 January 1973 in Fontenay-aux-Roses, Hauts-de-Seine) is an athlete from France, who competes in triathlon.

A member of the Poissy Triathlon Club he competed at the first Olympic triathlon at the 2000 Summer Olympics. He took seventh place with a total time of 1:49:18.03.

Four years later, at the 2004 Summer Olympics, Marceau competed again. This time he competed on the Swiss team, placing eighth with a time of 1:52:44.36.
