= Isabelle Mouthon-Michellys =

French triathlete

Personal information
- Born: June 14, 1966 (age 60) Annecy, France

Sport
- Sport: Triathlon

Isabelle Mouthon-Michellys (born 14 June 1966 in Annecy) is an athlete from France, who competes in triathlon.

Mouthon competed at the first Olympic triathlon at the 2000 Summer Olympics. She took seventh place with a total time of 2:02:53.41. Her split times were 19:48.98 for the swim, 1:05:28.50 for the cycling, and 0:37:35.93 for the run.

Her twin sister, Béatrice Mouthon, also competed in the 2000 Olympic triathlon.
