= Rainer Müller-Hörner =

German triathlete

Personal information
- Born: 27 January 1967 (age 59) Fürth, Germany
Medal record
Men's Triathlon
Representing Germany
Ironman World Championships
Bronze medal – third place	1995 Kailu-Kona	Elite
ITU World Championships
Silver medal – second place	1992 Huntsville	Elite
ETU European Championships
Gold medal – first place	1995 Jümme	Elite

Rainer Robert Müller-Hörner (born 27 January 1967 in Fürth) is a retired male triathlete from Germany, who is best known for winning the European title in 1995. Müller-Hörner was a professional athlete from 1984 to 1994. He was awarded the Silbernes Lorbeerblatt, Germany's highest award for sporting achievement, in 2003.

He is married to Yvonne Hörner.
