= Glenn Cook =

British triathlete

Personal information
- Full name: Glenn Cook
- Nationality: British

Sport
- Country: Great Britain
- Sport: Triathlon
- Partner: Sarah Coope
Medal record
Representing United Kingdom
Men's Triathlon
ITU Triathlon World Championships
Silver medal – second place	ITU Triathlon World Championships	1989 Avignon
ETU Middle Distance Triathlon Championships
Gold medal – first place	ETU Middle Distance Triathlon Championships	1987 Roth
Gold medal – first place	ETU Middle Distance Triathlon Championships	1992 Joroinen
Gold medal – first place	ETU Middle Distance Triathlon Championships	1992 Lommel
GBR Middle Distance Triathlon Championships
Gold medal – first place	GBR Middle Distance Triathlon Championships	1992 Great Britain
ETU Duathlon Championships
Silver medal – second place	ETU Duathlon Championships	1991 Birmingham

Glenn Cook is a British former professional triathlete, Team GB Olympic Women's head coach, London 2012 selector and now working as a triathlon coach in Eastbourne.

== Personal life ==
Glenn lives with his partner Sarah Coope in Eastbourne, a fellow highly successful former professional triathlete.

The couple have four daughters. Chloe Cook (born 1994) is a professional triathlete competing at short (ITU) and middle distance (Ironman 70.3).

Ysabel cook and Grace cook are their two middle children who are succeeding and have many aspirations outside of triathlon.

Their youngest daughter Beth Cook is also an aspiring triathlete.

== Triathlon career ==
ITU/ETU Results

Date	Position	Event	Classification	Time
1995-07-30	23	1995 Stockholm ETU Triathlon European Championships	Elite Men	01:50:16
1992-12-05	2	1992 Eilat ETU Triathlon European Cup	Elite Men	01:51:53
1992-10-22	2	1992 Alanya ETU Triathlon European Cup	Elite Men	01:50:07
1992-09-12	16	1992 Huntsville ITU Triathlon World Championships	Elite Men	01:51:14
1992-09-12	5	1992 Huntsville ITU Triathlon World Championships	Men Team	01:51:14
1992-08-29	1	1992 Venice ETU Triathlon European Cup	Elite Men	01:58:44
1992-08-16	2	1992 Echternach ETU Triathlon European Cup	Elite Men	01:56:10
1992-08-01	1	1992 Joroinen ETU Middle Distance Triathlon European Championships	Men Team	03:37:58
1992-08-01	1	1992 Joroinen ETU Middle Distance Triathlon European Championships	Elite Men	03:37:58
1992-07-18	2	1992 Ironbridge ETU Triathlon European Cup	Elite Men	03:56:56
1992-07-05	1	1992 Lommel ETU Triathlon European Championships	Men Team	01:49:15
1992-07-05	3	1992 Lommel ETU Triathlon European Championships	Elite Men	01:49:15
1992-06-28	1	1992 Parco del Delta ETU Triathlon European Cup	Elite Men	03:25:03
1992-06-07	3	1992 Frankfurt ITU Duathlon World Championships	Men Team	02:35:42
1992-06-07	5	1992 Frankfurt ITU Duathlon World Championships	Elite Men	02:35:42
1992-05-17	2	1992 Geel ETU Triathlon European Cup	Elite Men	01:49:48
1992-01-01	1	1992 GBR Middle Distance Triathlon National Championships	Elite Men	00:00:00
1992-01-01	3	1992 GBR Triathlon National Championships	Elite Men	00:00:00
1991-09-15	2	1991 Birmingham ETU Duathlon European Championships	Elite Men's Team	01:20:34
1991-09-15	3	1991 Birmingham ETU Duathlon European Championships	Elite Men	01:20:34
1991-09-08	15	1991 Geneva ETU Triathlon European Championships	Elite Men	01:56:25
1991-08-04	11	1991 Toronto ITU Triathlon World Cup	Elite Men	01:54:23
1990-09-15	71	1990 Orlando ITU Triathlon World Championships	Elite Men	02:03:59
1990-08-26	3	1990 Linz ETU Triathlon European Championships	Men Team	01:53:00
1990-08-26	15	1990 Linz ETU Triathlon European Championships	Elite Men	01:53:00
1989-08-06	2	1989 Avignon ITU Triathlon World Championships	Elite Men	02:00:03
1989-06-20	4	1988 Venice ETU Triathlon European Championships	Elite Men	01:51:17
1987-06-20	1	1987 Roth ETU Middle Distance Triathlon European Championships	Elite Men	03:57:19
1985-07-27	23	1985 Immenstadt ETU Triathlon European Championships	Elite Men	02:46:31

== Coaching career ==
Cook was appointed as British Triathlon's Olympic Head Women's Coach in June 2011, Olympic selector in 2012 and was instrumental in the performances of the Team GB women at London 2012, namely Helen Jenkins, Vicky Holland and Lucy Hall.
