= Rob Barel =

Dutch triathlete (born 1957)

Medal record

Representing the Netherlands

Men's Triathlon

ITU Triathlon World Championships
Bronze medal – third place	1992 Huntsville	Elite

ITU Long Distance World Championships
Gold medal – first place	1994 Nice	Elite
Silver medal – second place	1997 Nice	Elite
Silver medal – second place	1998 Sado Island	Elite

ETU Triathlon European Championships
Gold medal – first place	1985 Immenstadt	Elite
Gold medal – first place	1986 Marseille	Elite
Gold medal – first place	1987 Milton Keynes	Elite
Silver medal – second place	1989 Cascais	Elite
Silver medal – second place	1990 Linz	Elite
Silver medal – second place	1991 Geneva	Elite

ETU Middle Distance Triathlon European Championships
Gold medal – first place	1994 Nove Mesto	Elite
Silver medal – second place	1991 Trier	Elite

ETU Long Distance Triathlon European Championships
Silver medal – second place	1985 Almere	Elite
Silver medal – second place	1987 Joroinen	Elite
Silver medal – second place	1993 Embrun	Elite

ETU Cross Triathlon European Championships
Gold medal – first place	2008 Ameland	Elite

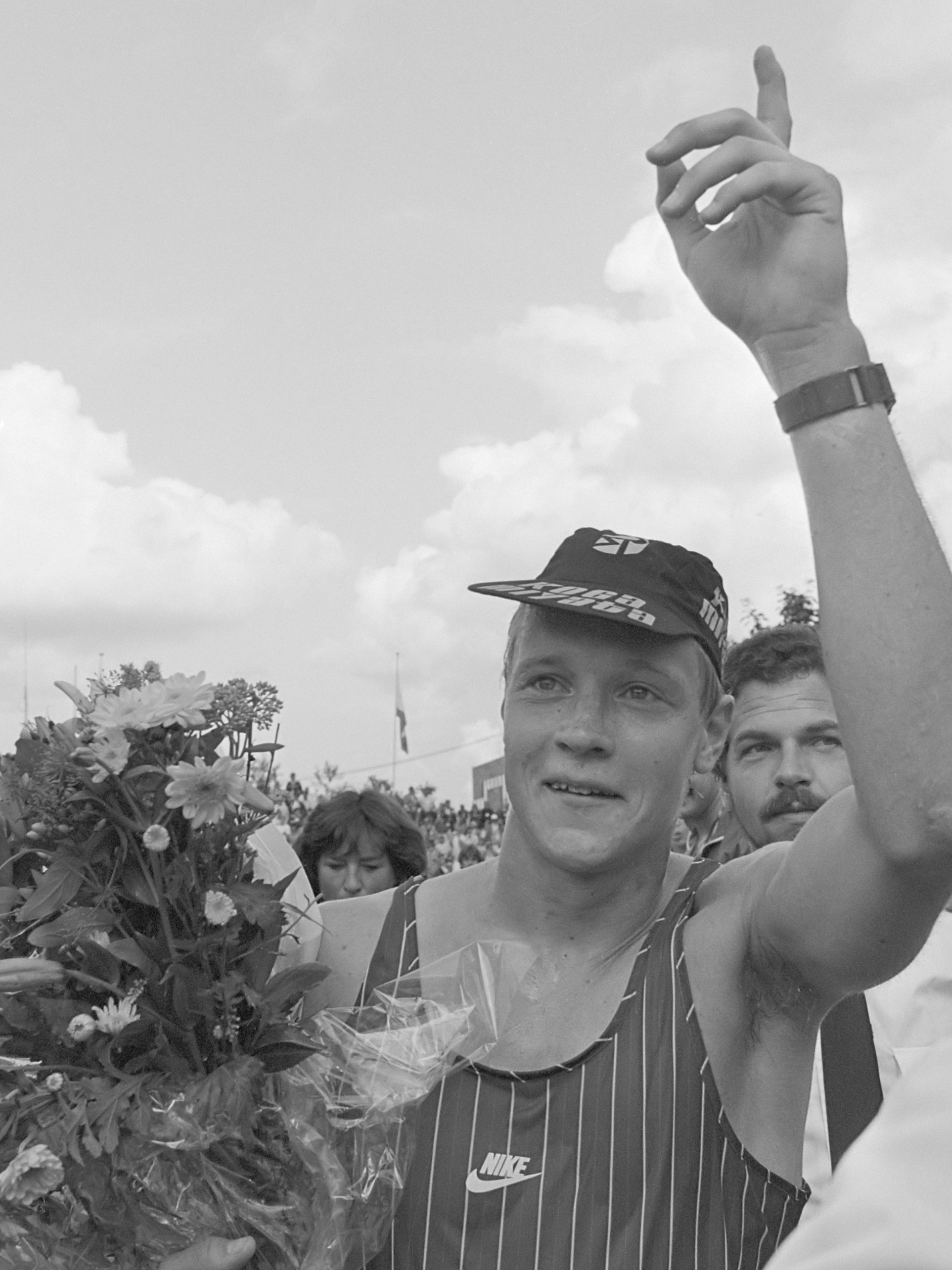

Robert Alexander Barel (born 23 December 1957 in Amsterdam) is a Dutch former professional triathlete.

== Career ==
Originally a swimmer, Barel competed and won his first triathlon in 1982 (Amsterdam). Won the very first ETU European Championships in 1985 (Immenstadt). Competed in the first ITU World Championships in 1989 (Avignon, 5th place). Won the first ITU Long Distance Championships in 1994 (Nice). Competed in the first Olympic triathlon at the 2000 Summer Olympics. He took forty-third place with a total time of 1:55:36.69 at the age of 42.

== Titles ==
- World Champion Long Distance triathlon: 1994
- European Champion Middle Distance triathlon EK: 1986, 1988, 1994
- European Champion Olympic distance triathlon: 1985, 1986, 1987, 1988
- National Champion Olympic distance triathlon: 1986, 1988, 1989, 1990, 1994, 1998
- National Champion duatlon: 1993, 1994, 1997
- National Champion cross triathlon: 2005, 2008
- European Champion cross triathlon: 2008
- National Champion Mountainbike Masters2: 2005, 2006, 2007

== Major achievements ==
Year	Pst.	Tournament	Venue
1984	3rd	National Championship Long Distance	Almere, Netherlands
1985	2nd	European Championships Long Distance	Almere, Netherlands
1987	2nd	European Championships Long Distance	Joroinen, Finland
1988	1st	European Championships Olympic Distance	Venice, Italy
1989	5th	World Championship Olympic Distance	Avignon, France
1989	2nd	European Championships Olympic Distance	Cascais, Portugal
1990	5th	World Championship Olympic Distance	Orlando, Florida, United States
1990	2nd	European Championships Olympic Distance	Linz, Austria
1991	2nd	European Championships Olympic Distance	Geneva, Switzerland
1992	2nd	National Championship duatlon	Den Dungen, Netherlands
1992	3rd	World Championship Olympic Distance	Huntsville, Ontario, Canada
1993	2nd	European Championships Long Distance	Embrun, France
1995	3rd	National Championship Long Distance	Almere, Netherlands
1996	3rd	European Championships duatlon	Mafra, Portugal
1997	2nd	Long Distance World Championships	Nice, France
1997	3rd	National Championship Olympic Distance	Roermond, Netherlands
1998	2nd	World Long Distance	Sado Island, Japan
2000	43rd	Olympic Games	Sydney, Australia
2003	2nd	National Championship Middle Distance	Nieuwkoop, Netherlands
2004	3rd	National Championship Middle Distance	Nieuwkoop, Netherlands
2008	2nd	Masters 2 National Championship Mountainbike	Oss, Netherlands
