= 2017 in triathlon =

This topic reveals a large number of triathlon events and their results for 2017.

== 2017 ITU World Triathlon Series ==
- March 3 & 4: WTS #1 in (United Arab Emirates) Abu Dhabi
  - Elite winners: (Spain) Javier Gómez Noya (m) / (New Zealand) Andrea Hewitt (f)
- April 8 & 9: WTS #2 in (Australia) Gold Coast, Queensland
  - Elite winners: (Spain) Mario Mola (m) / (New Zealand) Andrea Hewitt (f)
- May 13 & 14: WTS #3 in (Japan) Yokohama
  - Elite winners: (Spain) Mario Mola (m) / (Bermuda) Flora Duffy (f)
- June 10 & 11: WTS #4 in (United Kingdom) Leeds
  - Elite winners: (United Kingdom) Alistair Brownlee (m) / (Bermuda) Flora Duffy (f)
- July 15 & 16: WTS #5 in (Germany) Hamburg
  - Elite winners: (Spain) Mario Mola (m) / (Bermuda) Flora Duffy (f)
- July 28 & 29: WTS #6 in (Canada) Edmonton
  - Elite winners: (Spain) Mario Mola (m) / (Bermuda) Flora Duffy (f)
- August 5 & 6: WTS #7 in (Canada) Montreal
  - Elite winners: (Spain) Javier Gómez Noya (m) / (Australia) Ashleigh Gentle (f)
- August 26 & 27: WTS #8 in (Sweden) Stockholm
  - Elite winners: (United Kingdom) Jonny Brownlee (m) / (Bermuda) Flora Duffy (f)
- September 14 – 17: WTS Grand Final (#9) in (Netherlands) Rotterdam
  - Elite winners: (France) Vincent Luis (m) / (Bermuda) Flora Duffy (f)
  - Junior winners: (Australia) Matthew Hauser (m) / (United States) Taylor Knibb (f)
  - U23 winners: (France) Raphael Montoya (m) / (United States) Tamara Gorman (f)

== World triathlon championships ==
- July 15 & 16: 2017 ITU Mixed Relay World Championships in (Germany) Hamburg
  - 4x Mixed Relay winners: Australia (Charlotte McShane, Matthew Hauser, Ashleigh Gentle, & Jacob Birtwhistle)
- August 18 – 27: 2017 ITU Multisport World Championships in (Canada) Penticton (debut event)
  - Aquathlon
  - Elite winners: (Canada) Matthew Sharpe (m) / (United Kingdom) Emma Pallant (f)
  - Junior winners: (Canada) Aiden Longcroft-Harris (m) / (Switzerland) Delia Sclabas (f)
  - U23 winners: (Canada) Brennen Smith (m) / (United Kingdom) Chloe Pollard (f)
  - Cross triathlon
  - Elite winners: (Mexico) Francisco Serrano (m) / (Canada) Melanie McQuaid (f)
  - Junior winners: (Australia) Alec Davison (m) / (Canada) Holly Henry (f)
  - U23 winners: (New Zealand) Kyle Smith (m) / (Australia) Penny Slater (f)
  - Duathlon
  - Elite winners: (France) Benoit Nicolas (m) / (Australia) Felicity Sheedy-Ryan (f)
  - Junior winners: (United Kingdom) Cameron Richardson (m) / (Switzerland) Delia Sclabas (f)
  - U23 winners: (United Kingdom) Richard Allen (m) / (France) Lucie Picard (f)
  - Long distance triathlon
  - Elite winners: (Canada) Lionel Sanders (m) / (Australia) Sarah Crowley (f)
- September 3: 2017 Zofingen ITU Powerman Long Distance Duathlon World Championships in Switzerland
  - Elite winners: (Russia) Maxim Kuzmin (m) / (United Kingdom) Emma Pooley (f)

== Regional triathlon championships ==
- February 25 & 26: 2017 Havana CAMTRI Middle Distance Triathlon Iberoamerican Championships in Cuba
  - Elite winners: (Cuba) Michel Gonzalez Castro (m) / (Cuba) Yadira Corona Cabrera (f; default)
- March 4: 2017 Playa Hermosa CAMTRI Triathlon Junior Central American and Caribbean Championships in Costa Rica
  - Junior winners: (Costa Rica) David Marin (m) / (Costa Rica) Raquel Solis Guerrero (f)
- March 11: 2017 Sarasota CAMTRI Triathlon Junior North American Championships in the United States
  - Junior winners: (United States) Darr Smith (m) / (South Korea) JEONG Hye-rim (f)
- March 19: 2017 Montevideo CAMTRI Triathlon Youth & Junior South American Championships in Uruguay
  - Junior winners: (Chile) Diego Moya (m) / (Argentina) Miranda Moira (f)
  - Youth winners: (Argentina) Juan Santiago Girard (m) / (Argentina) Delfina Orlandini (f)
- March 19: 2017 Montevideo CAMTRI Sprint Triathlon American Cup & Iberoamerican and South American Championship in Uruguay
  - Elite winners: (Brazil) Manoel Messias (m) / (Spain) Camila Alonso (f)
- April 7 & 8: 2017 Sharm El Sheikh ATU Sprint Triathlon African Cup and Pan Arab Championships in Egypt
  - Elite winners: (Russia) Vladimir Turbayevskiy (m) / (Russia) Elena Danilova (f)
  - Junior winners: (Morocco) Kouzkouz Nabil (m) / (Egypt) Rehab Hamdy (f)
  - Youth winners: (Egypt) Khaled Walid (m) / (Tunisia) Syrine Fattoum (f)
- April 23: 2017 Bridgetown CAMTRI Sprint Triathlon American Cup and Central American and Caribbean Championship in Barbados
  - Elite winners: (Mexico) Cesar Saracho (m) / (United States) Lindsey Jerdonek (f)
- July 2: 2017 Altafulla ETU Triathlon European Cup and Mediterranean Championships in Spain
  - Elite winners: (Spain) Uxio Abuin Ares (m) / (United States) Summer Cook (f)
- July 7 – 9: 2017 Ruse ETU Aquathlon and Triathlon Balkan Championships in Bulgaria
  - Aquathlon Elite winners: (Romania) Andrei Sergiu Chis (m) / (Turkey) Buse Aygün (f; default)
  - Triathlon Elite winners: (Serbia) Ognjen Stojanović (m) / (Israel) Marie Elias (f)
- July 29 & 30: 2017 Astana ASTC Sprint Triathlon Asian Cup and Central Asian Championships in Kazakhstan
  - Elite winners: (Australia) Marcel Walkington (m) / (Hungary) Zsanett Bragmayer (f)
- August 13: 2017 Riga ETU Triathlon Baltic Championships in Latvia
  - Elite winners: (Belarus) Mikita Katsianeu (m) / (Ukraine) Vira Sosnova (f)
- September 2 & 3: 2017 Fredericia ETU Nordic Triathlon Championships in Denmark
  - Elite winners: (Denmark) Andreas Schilling (m) / (Sweden) Amanda Bohlin (f)
- October 5 & 6: 2017 Aqaba ASTC Sprint Triathlon Asian Cup and West Asian Championships in Jordan
  - Elite winners: (Australia) Marcel Walkington (m) / (Ukraine) Yuliya Yelistratova (f)

== 2017 ITU Triathlon World Cup ==
- February 11 & 12: TWC #1 in (South Africa) Cape Town
  - Elite winners: (South Africa) Richard Murray (m) / (United Kingdom) Lucy Hall (f)
- March 11 & 12: TWC #2 in (Australia) Mooloolaba
  - Elite winners: (Australia) Luke Willian (m) / (Australia) Emma Jackson (f)
- April 1 & 2: TWC #3 in (New Zealand) New Plymouth
  - Elite winners: (South Africa) Richard Murray (m) / (United States) Katie Zaferes (f)
- May 6 & 7: TWC #4 in (China) Chengdu
  - Elite winners: (Australia) Matthew Hauser (m) / (United Kingdom) Non Stanford (f)
- May 27 & 28: TWC #5 in (Spain) Madrid
  - Elite winners: (New Zealand) Ryan Sissons (m) / (United Kingdom) Georgia Taylor-Brown (f)
- June 3 & 4: TWC #6 in (Italy) Cagliari
  - Elite winners: (Switzerland) Adrien Briffod (m) / (Switzerland) Jolanda Annen (f)
- July 22 & 23: TWC #7 in (Hungary) Tiszaújváros
  - Elite winners: (Hungary) Bence Bicsák (m) / (United States) Renee Tomlin (f)
- August 12 & 13: TWC #8 in (Mexico) Mérida, Yucatán
  - Elite winners: (Mexico) Irving Pérez (m) / (United States) Summer Cook (f)
- September 2 & 3: TWC #9 in (Czech Republic) Karlovy Vary
  - Elite winners: (Norway) Gustav Iden (m) / (Australia) Gillian Backhouse (f)
- September 23 & 24: TWC #10 in (Spain) Huelva
  - Elite winners: (Germany) Justus Nieschlag (m) / (Czech Republic) Vendula Frintová (f)
- September 30 & October 1: TWC #11 in (China) Weihai
  - Elite winners: (Spain) Uxio Abuin Ares (m) / (Switzerland) Jolanda Annen (f)
- October 7 & 8: TWC #12 in (United States) Sarasota-Bradenton
  - Elite winners: (Mexico) Rodrigo González (m) / (Japan) Juri Ide (f)
- October 28 & 29: TWC #13 in Salinas, Ecuador
  - Elite winners: (Mexico) Crisanto Grajales (m) / (Ecuador) Elizabeth Bravo (f)
- October 28 & 29: TWC #14 in (South Korea) Tongyeong
  - Elite winners: (France) Aurelien Raphael (m) / (United States) Summer Cook (f)
- November 4 & 5: TWC #15 (final) in (Japan) Miyazaki
  - Elite winners: (Belgium) Marten Van Riel (m) / (United States) Summer Cook (f)

== European Triathlon Union (ETU) ==
- January 28 & 29: 2017 Otepää ETU Winter Triathlon European Championships in Estonia
  - Elite winners: (Russia) Pavel Andreev (m) / (Czech Republic) Helena Erbenová (f)
  - Junior winners: (Russia) Aleksandr Vasilev (m) / (Russia) Polina Tarakanova (f)
  - U23 winners: (Russia) Roman Vasin (m) / (Russia) Daria Rogozina (f)
- April 29 & 30: 2017 Soria ETU Duathlon European Championships in Spain
  - Elite winners: (Spain) Emilio Martin (m) / (France) Sandra Levenez (f)
  - Junior winners: (United Kingdom) Alex Yee (m) / (Switzerland) Delia Sclabas (f)
  - U23 winners: (United Kingdom) Richard Allen (m) / (France) Lucie Picard (f)
- May 21: 2017 Sankt Wendel ETU Powerman Middle Distance Duathon European Championships in Germany
  - Elite winners: (Germany) Felix Köhler (m) / (United Kingdom) Emma Pooley (f)
- May 27: 2017 Bratislava ETU Aquathlon European Championships in Slovakia
  - Elite winners: (Slovakia) Richard Varga (m) / (United Kingdom) Hannah Kitchen (f)
  - Junior winners: (Hungary) Gergő Soós (m) / (Slovakia) Kristina Jesenska (f)
  - U23 winners: (Hungary) Márk Dévay (m) / (Slovakia) Romana Gajdošová (f)
- June 10: 2017 Herning ETU Challenge Middle Distance Triathlon European Championships in Denmark
  - Elite winners: (Germany) Patrick Dirksmeier (m) / (Denmark) Camilla Pedersen (f)
- June 16 – 18: 2017 Kitzbühel ETU Triathlon European Championships in Austria
  - Elite winners: (Portugal) João Pereira (m) / (United Kingdom) Jessica Learmonth (f)
  - Junior winners: (Portugal) Vasco Vilaça (m) / (United Kingdom) Kate Waugh (f)
- June 24 & 25: 2017 Düsseldorf ETU Sprint Triathlon European Championships in Germany
  - Elite winners: (Portugal) João José Pereira (m) / (Germany) Laura Lindemann (f)
- July 13 – 16: 2017 Panevėžys ETU Triathlon Youth European Championships Festival in Lithuania
  - Youth winners: (United Kingdom) Daniel Slater (m) / (France) Jessica Fullagar (f)
  - Youth 4x Mixed Relay winners: Great Britain (Freya Thomson, Daniel Slater, Abbie Williams, & Matthew Willis)
- July 23: 2017 Banyoles ETU Triathlon Clubs European Championships in Spain
  - 4x Mixed Relay winners: (Portugal) S.L. Benfica
  - Junior 4x Mixed Relay winners: (Spain) Cidade de Lugo Fluvial
- July 27 & 28: 2017 Târgu Mureș ETU Cross Duathlon European Championships in Romania
  - Elite winners: (France) Brice Daubord (m) / (Netherlands) Sanne Broeksma (f)
  - Junior winners: (Spain) Miquel Riusech (m) / (Italy) Marta Menditto (f)
  - U23 winners: (Romania) Szabolcs Kovacs (m) / (Russia) Daria Rogozina (f)
- July 27 – 30: 2017 Târgu Mureș ETU Cross Triathlon European Championships in Romania
  - Elite winners: (Italy) Marcello Ugazio (m) / (Hungary) Brigitta Poór (f)
  - Junior winners: (Italy) Filippo Pradella (m) / (Ukraine) Sofiya Pryyma (f)
  - U23 winners: (Italy) Marcello Ugazio (m) / (Russia) Daria Rogozina (f)
- August 5 & 6: 2017 Velence ETU U23 Triathlon European Championships in Hungary
  - U23 winners: (Hungary) Bence Bicsák (m) / (United Kingdom) Georgia Taylor-Brown (f)
  - U23 4x Mixed Relay winners: Great Britain (Georgia Taylor-Brown, Samuel Dickinson, Sian Rainsley, & James Teagle)
- September 9: 2017 Almere-Amsterdam ETU Challenge Long Distance Triathlon European Championships in the Netherlands
  - Elite winners: (United Kingdom) Joe Skipper (m) / (Netherlands) Yvonne van Vlerken (f)

== American Triathlon Confederation (CAMTRI) ==
- March 11: 2017 Sarasota CAMTRI Sprint Triathlon and Mixed Relay American Championships in the United States
  - Elite winners: (Mexico) Rodrigo González (m) / (Canada) Joanna Brown (f)
- March 11: 2017 Sarasota CAMTRI Paratriathlon American Championship in the United States
  - PT1 winners: (Brazil) Fernando Aranha (m) / (United States) Mary Catherine Callahan (f)
  - PT2 winners: (United States) Mark Barr (m) / (United States) Allysa Seely (f)
  - PT3 winners: (United States) Brian Norberg (m) / (Brazil) Fernanda Katheline Pereira (f; default)
  - PT4 winners: (United States) Jamie Brown (m) / (United States) Patricia Collins (f)
  - PT5 winners: (United States) Chris Hammer (m) / (United States) Grace Norman (f)
  - PT6 winners: (United States) Aaron Scheidies (m) / (United States) Elizabeth Baker (f)
- July 15: 2017 Magog CAMTRI Triathlon Junior American Championships in Canada
  - Junior winners: (United States) Darr Smith (m) / (Canada) Desirae Ridenour (f)
- October 22: 2017 Puerto López CAMTRI Triathlon American Championships in Ecuador
  - Elite winners: (Brazil) Manoel Messias (m) / (United States) Sophie Chase (f)
  - U23 winners: (Brazil) Manoel Messias (m) / (United States) Sophie Chase (f)

== Oceania Triathlon Union (OTU) ==
- February 12: 2017 Kinloch OTU Sprint Triathlon Oceania Championships in New Zealand
  - Elite winners: (New Zealand) Ryan Sissons (m) / (Australia) Emma Jackson (f)
  - U23 winners: (New Zealand) Sam Ward (m) / (Australia) Emma Jeffcoat (f)
- March 4 & 5: 2017 Perth OTU Triathlon Junior Oceania Championships in Australia
  - Junior winners: (Australia) Matthew Hauser (m) / (Australia) Joanne Miller (f)
  - 4xMixed Relay Junior winners: Australia (Samantha Whitting, Matthew Hauser, Joanne Miller, & Nicholas Free)
- March 18: 2017 Devonport OTU Triathlon Oceania Championships in Australia
  - Elite winners: (Australia) Matthew Baker (m) / (Australia) Emma Jeffcoat (f)
  - U23 winners: (Australia) Matthew Baker (m) / (Australia) Emma Jeffcoat (f)

== Asian Triathlon Confederation (ASTC) ==
- March 4 & 5: 2017 Putrajaya ASTC Powerman Middle Distance Duathlon Asian Championships in Malaysia
  - Elite winners: (Netherlands) Thomas Bruins (m) / (Hungary) Annamária Eberhardt-Halász (f)
- April 29 & 30: 2017 Subic Bay ASTC Paratriathlon Asian Championships in the Philippines
  - Note: There was no PTS3 and Women's PTS5 events here.
  - PTHC winners: (Japan) Jumpei Kimura (m) / (Japan) Wakako Tsuchida (f; default)
  - PTS2 winners: (Japan) Kenshiro Nakayama (m) / (Japan) Yukako Hata (f; default)
  - PTS4 winners: (Japan) Hideki Uda (m) / (Japan) Mami Tani (f; default)
  - Men's PTS5 winner: (Japan) Keiichi Sato (m; default)
  - PTVI winners: (Hong Kong) CHU Kin Wa (m) / (Japan) Atsuko Maruo (f; default)
- July 22 & 23: 2017 Palembang ASTC Triathlon Asian Championships in Indonesia
  - Elite winners: (Japan) Jumpei Furuya (m) / (Japan) Yuko Takahashi (f)
  - Junior winners: (Hong Kong) Oscar Coggins (m) / (Japan) Fuka Sega (f)
  - U23 winners: (Japan) Koki Yamamoto (m) / (Japan) Hiraku Fukuoka (f)

== African Triathlon Union (ATU) ==
- May 6 & 7: 2017 Hammamet ATU Triathlon African Championships in Tunisia
  - Elite winners: (Russia) Alexander Bryukhankov (m) / (South Africa) Gillian Sanders (f)
  - Junior winners: (South Africa) Matthew Greer (m) / (South Africa) Jayme-Sue Vermaas (f)
  - U23 winners: (Morocco) Badr Siwane (m) / (South Africa) Celeste Renaud (f)
  - Youth winners: (France) Edouard Starck (m) / (Tunisia) Syrine Fattoum (f)

== 2017 ITU World Paratriathlon Series ==
- April 8: WPS #1 in (Australia) Gold Coast
  - Note: There was no women's PTS3 event here.
  - PTHC winners: (Netherlands) Jetze Plat (m) / (Australia) Emily Tapp (f)
  - PTS2 winners: (France) Stéphane Bahier (m) / (United States) Allysa Seely (f)
  - Men's PTS3 winner: (Australia) Justin Godfrey
  - PTS4 winners: (France) Alexis Hanquinquant (m) / (Australia) Sally Pilbeam (f)
  - PTS5 winners: (United States) Chris Hammer (m) / (Australia) Kate Doughty (f; default)
  - PTVI winners: (Australia) Jonathan Goerlach (m) / (United States) Elizabeth Baker (f)
- May 13: WPS #2 in (Japan) Yokohama
  - PTHC winners: (Netherlands) Geert Schipper (m) / (Japan) Wakako Tsuchida (f)
  - PTS2 winners: (United Kingdom) Andrew Lewis (m) / (United States) Allysa Seely (f)
  - PTS3 winners: (Spain) Daniel Molina (m) / (Russia) Anna Plotnikova (f)
  - PTS4 winners: (United States) Jamie Brown (m) / (Japan) Mami Tani (f)
  - PTS5 winners: (United States) Chris Hammer (m) / (Australia) Kate Doughty (f)
  - PTVI winners: (United Kingdom) Dave Ellis (m) / (United Kingdom) Alison Patrick (f)
- July 28: WPS #3 in (Canada) Edmonton
  - Note: There was no women's PTS3 event here.
  - PTWC winners: (Netherlands) Geert Schipper (m) / (Australia) Emily Tapp (f)
  - PTS2 winners: (France) Geoffrey Wersy (m) / (Finland) Liisa Lilja (f)
  - Men's PTS3 winner: (United Kingdom) Ryan Taylor
  - PTS4 winners: (United Kingdom) Steven Crowley (m) / (Japan) Mami Tani (f)
  - PTS5 winners: (Canada) Stefan Daniel (m) / (United States) Grace Norman (f)
  - PTVI winners: (United States) Aaron Scheidies (m) / (Australia) Katie Kelly (f)

== 2017 ITU Paratriathlon World Cup ==
- June 4: PWC #1 in (France) Besançon
  - Note: There was no women's PTS4 event here.
  - PTHC winners: (France) Ahmed Andaloussi (m) / (France) Mona Francis (f; default)
  - PTS2 winners: (Germany) Stefan Loesler (m) / (Italy) Veronica Yoko Plebani (f; default)
  - PTS3 winners: (Germany) Max Gelhaar (m) / (France) Elise Marc (f)
  - Men's PTS4 winner: (France) Alexis Hanquinquant
  - PTS5 winners: (Russia) Alexandr Ialchik (m) / (France) Gwladys Lemoussu (f)
  - PTVI winners: (Italy) Federico Sicura (m) / (Germany) Lena Dieter (f)
- July 2: PWC #2 in (Spain) Altafulla
  - Note: There was no women's PTS3 event here.
  - PTWC winners: (France) Ahmed Andaloussi (m) / (Spain) Eva María Moral Pedrero (f)
  - PTS2 winners: (France) Geoffrey Wersy (m) / Laia Casino Puiggali (f; default)
  - Men's PTS3 winner: (Spain) Joaquin Carrasco (default)
  - PTS4 winners: (United Kingdom) Steven Crowley (m) / (Japan) Mami Tani (f)
  - PTS5 winners: (Spain) Jairo Ruiz Lopez (m) / (United Kingdom) Claire Cashmore (f)
  - PTVI winners: (Spain) Héctor Catalá Laparra (m) / (Spain) Susana Rodriguez (f)
- July 8: PWC #3 in (Italy) Iseo-Franciacorta
  - Note: There was no women's PTS4 event here.
  - PTWC winners: (Italy) Giovanni Achenza (m) / (United Kingdom) Karen Darke (f)
  - PTS2 winners: (France) Stephane Bahier (m) / (Finland) Liisa Lilja (f)
  - PTS3 winners: (Croatia) Antun Bošnjaković (m) / (Russia) Anna Plotnikova (f)
  - Men's PTS4 winner: (France) Alexis Hanquinquant
  - PTS5 winners: (Spain) Jairo Ruiz Lopez (m) / (United Kingdom) Lauren Steadman (f)
  - PTVI winners: (Serbia) Lazar Filipovic (m) / (Italy) Anna Barbaro (f)
- July 15: PWC #4 in (Canada) Magog
  - Note: There was no PTS3, women's PTS2, women's PTS4, & women's PTS5 events here.
  - PTWC winners: (United States) Howie Sanborn (m) / (Australia) Emily Tapp (f; default)
  - Men's PTS2 winner: (United States) Allan Armstrong
  - Men's PTS4 winner: (United States) Joel Rosinbum
  - Men's PTS5 winner: (Canada) Stefan Daniel
  - PTVI winners: (Canada) Jon Dunkerley (m) / (United States) Amy Dixon (f)
- October 8: PWC #5 (final) in (United States) Sarasota, Florida
  - Note: There was no PTS3 events for men and women here.
  - PTWC winners: (Germany) Benjamin Lenatz (m) / (United States) Ahalya Lettenberger (f)
  - PTS2 winners: (United Kingdom) Andrew Lewis (m) / (Japan) Yukako Hata (f)
  - PTS4 winners: (Austria) Oliver Dreier (m) / (United States) Andrea Walton (f; default)
  - PTS5 winners: (Mexico) José Abraham Estrada Sierra (m) / (United States) Ruth-Ann Reeves (f; default)
  - PTVI winners: (France) Charles Edouard Catherine (m) / (United States) Amy Dixon (f)

== World Triathlon Corporation (WTC) ==
=== 2017 Main Ironman events ===
==== March ====
- March 4: 2017 Ironman New Zealand Championship in Taupō
  - Pro winners: (New Zealand) Braden Currie (m) / (United States) Jocelyn McCauley (f)

==== April ====
- April 2: 2017 Ironman African Championship in (South Africa) Port Elizabeth
  - Pro winners: (United States) Ben Hoffman (m) / (Switzerland) Daniela Ryf (f)
- April 22: 2017 Ironman North American Championship in (United States) The Woodlands, Texas
  - Pro winners: (United States) Matt Hanson (m) / (United States) Jodie Robertson (f)

==== May ====
- May 6: 2017 Ironman Australia Championship in Port Macquarie
  - Pro winners: (Australia) David Dellow (m) / (United Kingdom) Laura Siddall (f)
- May 20: 2017 Ironman Lanzarote Championship in the (Spain) Canary Islands
  - Pro winners: (Belgium) Bart Aernouts (m) / (United Kingdom) Lucy Charles (f)
- May 28: 2017 Ironman Brazil Championship in Florianópolis
  - Pro winners: (United Kingdom) Tim Don (m) / (United Kingdom) Susie Cheetham (f)

==== June ====
- June 11: 2017 Ironman Boulder Championship in the United States
  - Pro winners: (United States) Timothy O'Donnell (m) / (United Kingdom) Rachel Joyce (f)
- June 11: 2017 Ironman Asia-Pacific Championship in (Australia) Cairns
  - Pro winners: (Australia) Joshua Amberger (m) / (Australia) Sarah Crowley (f)

==== July ====
- July 2: 2017 Ironman Austria-Kärnten Championship in Klagenfurt
  - Pro winners: (Germany) Jan Frodeno (m) / (Austria) Eva Wutti (f)
- July 9: 2017 Ironman European Championship in (Germany) Frankfurt
  - Pro winners: (Germany) Sebastian Kienle (m) / (Australia) Sarah Crowley (f)
- July 16: 2017 Ironman United Kingdom Championship in (England) Bolton
  - Pro winners: (France) Cyril Viennot (m) / (United Kingdom) Lucy Gossage (f)
- July 23: 2017 Ironman Lake Placid Championship in the United States
  - Pro winners: (Canada) Brent McMahon (m) / (United States) Amy Farrell (f)
- July 23: 2017 Ironman France Championship in Nice
  - Pro winners: (Belgium) Frederik Van Lierde (m) / (Australia) Carrie Lester (f)
- July 29: 2017 Ironman Santa Rosa Championship in the United States
  - Pro winners: (United States) Nicholas Noone (m) / (United States) Chealsea Tiner (f)
- July 30: 2017 Ironman Switzerland Championship in Zürich
  - Pro winners: (Australia) Nicholas Kastelein (m) / (Switzerland) Céline Schärer (f)
- July 30: 2017 Ironman Canada Championship in Whistler & Pemberton
  - Pro winners: (Canada) Dylan Gleeson (m) / (United States) Linsey Corbin (f)

==== August ====
- August 6: 2017 Ironman Maastricht-Limburg Championship in the Netherlands
  - Pro winners: (Austria) Michael Weiss (m) / (Spain) Saleta Castro (f)
- August 13: 2017 Ironman Hamburg Championship in Germany
  - Pro winners: (South Africa) James Cunnama (m) / (Germany) Daniela Sämmler (f)
- August 19: 2017 Ironman Kalmar Championship in Sweden
  - Men's Pro winner: (Spain) Clemente Alonso-Mckernan
- August 20: 2017 Ironman Mont-Tremblant Championship in Canada
  - Pro winners: (Belgium) Marino Vanhoenacker (m) / (United Kingdom) Rachel Joyce (f)
- August 20: 2017 Ironman Copenhagen Championship in Denmark
  - Pro winners: (Spain) Pedro Jose Bastida Andujar (m) / (Denmark) Michelle Vesterby (f)
- August 27: 2017 Ironman Coeur d'Alene Championship in the United States
  - Pro winners: (United States) Mark Saroni (m) / (United States) Haley Cooper-Scott (f)
- August 27: 2017 Ironman Vichy Championship in (France) Auvergne-Rhône-Alpes
  - Pro winners: (Belgium) Bruno Clerbout (m) / (Belgium) Stefanie Adam (f)

==== September ====
- September 10: 2017 Ironman Wisconsin Championship in (United States) Madison
  - Men's Pro winner: (Australia) Luke McKenzie
- September 10: 2017 Ironman Gurye Championship in South Korea
  - Pro winners: (Austria) Thomas Frühwirth (m) / (United States) Jessica Jacobs (f)
- September 10: 2017 Ironman Wales Championship in (United Kingdom) Pembrokeshire
  - Pro winners: (Australia) Cameron Wurf (m) / (United Kingdom) Lucy Gossage (f)
- September 23: 2017 Ironman Emilia-Romagna Championship in (Italy) Cervia
  - Pro winners: (Germany) Andreas Dreitz (m) / (United Kingdom) Lucy Gossage (f)
- September 24: 2017 Ironman Chattanooga Championship in the United States
  - Pro winners: (Estonia) Villu Vakra (m) / (United States) Liz Lyles (f)
- September 30: 2017 Ironman Barcelona Championship in (Spain) Calella
  - Pro winners: (France) Antony Costes (m) / (Netherlands) Yvonne van Vlerken (f)

==== October ====
- October 1: 2017 Ironman Taiwan Championship in (Chinese Taipei) Penghu
  - Pro winners: (Australia) Kevin Collington (m) / (United States) Laurel Wassner (f)
- October 7: 2017 Ironman Maryland Championship in (United States) Cambridge
  - Pro winners: (United States) D.J. Snyder (m) / (United States Minor Outlying Islands) Molly Smith (f)
- October 14: 2017 Ironman World Championship in (United States) Kailua-Kona, Hawaii
  - Pro winners: (Germany) Patrick Lange (m) / (Switzerland) Daniela Ryf (f)
- October 15: 2017 Ironman Louisville Championship in the United States
  - Pro winners: (United States) Andrew Starykowicz (m) / (United States) Lisa Roberts (f)

==== November ====
- November 4: 2017 Ironman Florida Championship in (United States) Panama City Beach
  - Pro winners: (United States) James Burke (m) / (United States) Elyse Gallegos (f)
- November 11: 2017 Ironman Malaysia Championship in Langkawi
  - Pro winners: (France) Romain Guillaume (m) / (Germany) Diana Riesler (f)
- November 12: 2017 Ironman Los Cabos Championship in Mexico
  - Pro winners: (Colombia) Juan Valencia (m) / (United States) Amy Javens (f)
- November 19: 2017 Ironman Arizona Championship in (United States) Tempe
  - Pro winners: (Canada) Lionel Sanders (m) / (Finland) Kaisa Sali (f)
- November 26: 2017 Ironman Cozumel Championship in Mexico
  - Pro winners: (Germany) Sebastian Kienle (m) / (United States) Lisa Roberts (f)

==== December ====
- December 3: 2017 Ironman Mar del Plata Championship in Argentina
  - Pro winners: (United States) Matt Chrabot (m) / (United States) Sarah Piampiano (f)
- December 3: 2017 Ironman Western Australia Championship in Busselton
  - Pro winners: (New Zealand) Terenzo Bozzone (m) / (Australia) Melissa Hauschildt (f)

=== 2017 Ironman 70.3 events ===
- January
- January 15: 2017 Ironman 70.3 Pucón in Chile
  - Pro winners: (Canada) Lionel Sanders (m) / (Chile) Bárbara Riveros (f)
- January 27: 2017 Ironman 70.3 Dubai in the United Arab Emirates
  - Pro winners: (Spain) Javier Gómez (m) / (Switzerland) Daniela Ryf (f)
- January 29: 2017 Ironman 70.3 South Africa in Buffalo City Metropolitan Municipality
  - Pro winners: (France) Romain Guillaume (m) / (United Kingdom) Jodie Cunnama (f)
- February
- February 19: 2017 Ironman 70.3 Geelong in Australia
  - Pro winners: (Australia) Sam Appleton (m) / (Australia) Annabel Luxford (f)
- March
- March 4: 2017 Ironman 70.3 New Zealand in Taupō
  - Pro winners: (New Zealand) Jai Davies-Campbell (m) / (New Zealand) Rebecca Elliott (f)
- March 11: 2017 Ironman 70.3 Saipan in the Northern Mariana Islands
  - Pro winners: (South Korea) LEE Kwang-hoon (m) / (South Korea) CHOI Suk-hyeon (f)
- March 12: 2017 Ironman 70.3 Subic Bay in the Philippines
  - Pro winners: (Switzerland) Ruedi Wild (m) / (Czech Republic) Radka Kahlefeldt (f)
- March 12: 2017 Ironman 70.3 Buenos Aires in Argentina
  - Pro winners: (Canada) Lionel Sanders (m) / (United States) Haley Chura (f)
- March 19: 2017 Ironman 70.3 Taiwan in Taitung City
  - Pro winners: (Switzerland) Ruedi Wild (m) / (Chile) Bárbara Riveros (f)
- March 19: 2017 Ironman 70.3 Puerto Rico in San Juan
  - Pro winners: (Canada) Taylor Reid (m) / (United States) Alicia Kaye (f)
- March 19: 2017 Ironman 70.3 Campeche in Mexico
  - Pro winners: (United Kingdom) Tim Don (m) / (Canada) Heather Wurtele (f)
- April
- April 1: 2017 Ironman 70.3 Oceanside in the United States
  - Pro winners: (Canada) Lionel Sanders (m) / (United Kingdom) Holly Lawrence (f)
- April 1: 2017 Ironman 70.3 Liuzhou in China
  - Pro winners: (United Kingdom) Tim Don (m) / (South Africa) Jeanni Seymour (f)
- April 2: 2017 Ironman 70.3 Texas in (United States) Galveston
  - Pro winners: (Mexico) Mauricio Mendez Cruz (m) / (United Kingdom) Kimberley Morrison (f)
- April 9: 2017 Ironman 70.3 Florida in (United States) Haines City
  - Pro winners: (New Zealand) Michael Poole (m) / (United States) Sara Gibson (f)
- April 23: 2017 Ironman 70.3 Peru in Lima
  - Pro winners: (United States) Andy Potts (m) / (United States) Heather Jackson (f)
- April 23: 2017 Ironman 70.3 Palmas in Brazil
  - Pro winners: (Brazil) Igor Amorelli (m) / (Brazil) Beatriz Neres (f)
- May
- May 6: 2017 Ironman 70.3 St. George in the United States
  - Pro winners: (United Kingdom) Alistair Brownlee (m) / (United Kingdom) Holly Lawrence (f)
- May 7: 2017 Ironman 70.3 Vietnam in Da Nang
  - Pro winners: (Australia) Tim Berkel (m) / (Hungary) Anna Eberhardt (f)
- May 7: 2017 Ironman 70.3 Port Macquarie in Australia
  - Pro winners: (Australia) Blake Kappler (m) / (Australia) Laura Brown (f)
- May 7: 2017 Ironman 70.3 Saint Croix in the United States Virgin Islands
  - Pro winners: (Martinique) Francky Favre (m) / (United States) Rebecca McKee (f)
- May 7: 2017 Ironman 70.3 Busselton in Australia
  - Pro winners: (Australia) Dan Wilson (m) / (Australia) Katey Gibb (f)
- May 13: 2017 Ironman 70.3 Gulf Coast in (United States) Panama City Beach
  - Pro winners: (United States) Tyler Jordan (m) / (United States) Rachel Olson (f)
- May 13: 2017 Ironman 70.3 Santa Rosa in the United States
  - Pro winners: (Australia) Sam Appleton (m) / (United Kingdom) Holly Lawrence (f)
- May 13: 2017 Ironman 70.3 Mallorca in Spain
  - Pro winners: (United Kingdom) David McNamee (m) / (Germany) Laura Philipp (f)
- May 14: 2017 Ironman 70.3 Monterrey in Mexico
  - Pro winners: (United States) Kevin Collington (m) / (South Africa) Jeanni Seymour (f)
- May 14: 2017 Ironman 70.3 Pays d'Aix in (France) Aix-en-Provence
  - Pro winners: (France) Bertrand Billard (m) / (Switzerland) Emma Bilham (f)
- May 21: 2017 Ironman 70.3 Chattanooga in the United States
  - Pro winners: (United States) Matthew Russell (m) / (United States) Heather Jackson (f)
- May 21: 2017 Ironman 70.3 Barcelona in (Spain) Calella
  - Pro winners: (Germany) Jan Frodeno (m) / (United Kingdom) Emma Pallant (f)
- May 21: 2017 Ironman 70.3 St. Pölten in Austria
  - Pro winners: (Germany) Nils Frommhold (m) / (Germany) Laura Philipp (f)
- June
- June 3: 2017 Ironman 70.3 Hawaii in the United States
  - Pro winners: (New Zealand) John Newsom (m) / (United States) Bree Wee (f)
- June 4: 2017 Ironman 70.3 Victoria in Canada
  - Pro winners: (Estonia) Marko Albert (m) / (United States) Kelsey Withrow (f)
- June 4: 2017 Ironman 70.3 Raleigh in the United States
  - Pro winners: (Bermuda) Tyler Butterfield (m) / (Canada) Stephanie Roy (f)
- June 11: 2017 Ironman 70.3 Eagleman in (United States) Cambridge, Maryland
  - Pro winners: (Australia) Sam Appleton (m) / (United States) Lindsey Jerdonek (f)
- June 11: 2017 Ironman 70.3 Cairns in Australia
  - Pro winners: (New Zealand) Dan Plews (m) / (Australia) Madi Roberts (f)
- June 11: 2017 Ironman 70.3 Wisconsin in the United States
  - Pro winners: (United States) Ryan Giuliano (m) / (United States) Danielle Vsetecka (f)
- June 11: 2017 Ironman 70.3 Tokoname in Japan
  - Pro winners: (Australia) Ryan Fisher (m) / (Australia) Laura Dennis (f)
- June 11: 2017 Ironman 70.3 Rapperswil-Jona in Switzerland
  - Pro winners: (Switzerland) Ruedi Wild (m) / (Switzerland) Daniela Ryf (f)
- June 11: 2017 Ironman 70.3 Kraichgau in Germany
  - Pro winners: (Germany) Sebastian Kienle (m) / (Germany) Laura Philipp (f)
- June 18: 2017 Ironman 70.3 Playas del Coco in Costa Rica
  - Pro winners: (United States) Kevin Collington (m) / (United Kingdom) Leanda Cave (f)
- June 18: 2017 Ironman 70.3 Syracuse in the United States
  - Pro winners: (United States) Robert Hollinger (m) / (United States) Amy Farrell (f)
- June 18: 2017 Ironman 70.3 Staffordshire in England
  - Pro winners: (Italy) Guilio Molinari (m) / (United Kingdom) Lucy Gossage (f)
- June 18: 2017 Ironman 70.3 Durban in South Africa
  - Pro winners: (Luxembourg) Olivier Godart (m) / (South Africa) Jade Nicole (f)
- June 18: 2017 Ironman 70.3 Region Moselle in Luxembourg
  - Pro winners: (Belgium) Kenneth Vandendriessche (m) / (Belgium) Alexandra Tondeur (f)
- June 18: 2017 Ironman 70.3 Pescara in Italy
  - Pro winners: (France) Cyril Viennot (m) / (Austria) Lisa Huetthaler (f)
- June 18: 2017 Ironman 70.3 European Championship in (Denmark) Elsinore
  - Men's Pro winner: (Germany) Michael Raelert
- June 25: 2017 Ironman 70.3 Coeur d'Alene in the United States
  - Pro winners: (United States) Matt Hanson (m) / (United States) Haley Chura (f)
- June 25: 2017 Ironman 70.3 Exmoor in (England) Wimbleball Lake
  - Pro winners: (United Kingdom) Marton Cseik (m) / (United Kingdom) Ruth Purbroo (f)
- June 25: 2017 Ironman 70.3 Buffalo Springs Lake in (United States) Lubbock, Texas
  - Pro winners: (United States) Mark Saroni (m) / (United Kingdom) Jennifer Davis (f)
- June 25: 2017 Ironman 70.3 Mont-Tremblant in Canada
  - Pro winners: (Canada) Lionel Sanders (m) / (United Kingdom) Holly Lawrence (f)
- July
- July 2: 2017 Ironman 70.3 Edinburgh in Scotland
  - Pro winners: (Germany) Andreas Raelert (m) / (United Kingdom) Emma Pallant (f)
- July 2: 2017 Ironman 70.3 Austria-Kärnten in Klagenfurt
  - Pro winners: (Germany) Jan Frodeno (m) / (Austria) Eva Wutti (f)
- July 2: 2017 Ironman 70.3 Haugesund in Norway
  - Men's Pro winner: (Norway) Allan Hovda
- July 8: 2017 Ironman 70.3 Muncie in the United States
  - Pro winners: (United States) Daniel Stubleski (m) / (United States) Dani Fischer (f)
- July 9: 2017 Ironman 70.3 Muskoka in Canada
  - Pro winners: (France) Jérémy Morel (m) / (Canada) Fiona Whitby (f)
- July 9: 2017 Ironman 70.3 Jönköping in Sweden
  - Pro winners: (Australia) Josh Amberger (m) / (Austria) Lisa Huetthaler (f)
- July 16: 2017 Ironman 70.3 Racine in the United States
  - Pro winners: (Australia) Sam Appleton (m) / (United Kingdom) Holly Lawrence (f)
- July 23: 2017 Ironman 70.3 Calgary in Canada
  - Pro winners: (Australia) Josh Amberger (m) / (United States) Heather Jackson (f)
- July 30: 2017 Ironman 70.3 Ecuador in Manta
  - Pro winners: (Brazil) Reinaldo Colucci (m) / (United States) Kelsey Withrow (f)
- July 30: 2017 Ironman 70.3 Ohio in (United States) Delaware
  - Pro winners: (United States) Michael Vulanich (m) / (United States) Peggy Yetman (f)
- July 30: 2017 Ironman 70.3 Canada in Whistler
  - Pro winners: (Canada) Graham Hood (m) / (United States) Christine Hoffman (f)
- August
- August 5: 2017 Ironman 70.3 Boulder in the United States
  - Pro winners: (United Kingdom) Tim Don (m) / (South Africa) Jeanni Seymour (f)
- August 5: 2017 Ironman 70.3 Otepää in Estonia
  - Pro winners: (Germany) Johannes Moldan (m) / (Denmark) Helle Frederiksen (f)
- August 6: 2017 Ironman 70.3 Alagoas in (Brazil) Maceió
  - Pro winners: (Brazil) Francisco Sartore (m) / (Brazil) Vanessa Gianinni (f)
- August 6: 2017 Ironman 70.3 Philippines in Cebu
  - Pro winners: (Australia) Tim Reed (m) / (New Zealand) Amelia Rose Watkinson (f)
- August 6: 2017 Ironman 70.3 Gdynia in Poland
  - Pro winners: (Germany) Boris Stein (m) / (Austria) Lisa Huetthaler (f)
- August 13: 2017 Ironman 70.3 Steelhead in (United States) Benton Harbor
  - Men's Pro winner: (United States) Andrew Starykowicz
- August 20: 2017 Ironman 70.3 Bintan in Indonesia
  - Pro winners: (New Zealand) Mike Philips (m) / (New Zealand) Amelia Rose Watkinson (f)
- August 20: 2017 Ironman 70.3 Dublin in Ireland
  - Pro winners: (United Kingdom) David McNamee (m) / (United Kingdom) Sarah Lewis (f)
- August 26: 2017 Ironman 70.3 Vichy in France
  - Pro winners: (Belgium) Frederik Van Lierde (m) / (United States) Jocelyn McCauley (f)
- August 27: 2017 Ironman 70.3 Maine in the United States
  - Pro winners: (United Kingdom) David Bartlett (m) / (United States) Ashley Forsyth (f)
- August 27: 2017 Ironman 70.3 Qujing in China
  - Pro winners: (Italy) Domenico Passuello (m) / (United States) Sarah Piampiano (f)
- August 27: 2017 Ironman 70.3 Zell am See-Kaprun in Austria
  - Pro winners: (Germany) Boris Stein (m) / (Germany) Laura Philipp (f)
- September
- September 2: 2017 Ironman 70.3 Lanzarote in Spain
  - Pro winners: (South Africa) James Cunnama (m) / (Germany) Anne Haug (f)
- September 3: 2017 Ironman 70.3 Cascais in Portugal
  - Pro winners: (France) Denis Chevrot (m) / (Portugal) Vanessa Fernandes (f)
- September 9 & 10: 2017 Ironman 70.3 World Championship in (United States) Chattanooga, Tennessee
  - Pro winners: (Spain) Javier Gómez (m) / (Switzerland) Daniela Ryf (f)
- September 10: 2017 Ironman 70.3 Sunshine Coast in (Australia) Mooloolaba
  - Pro winners: (Australia) Dan Wilson (m) / (Australia) Katey Gibb (f)
- September 10: 2017 Ironman 70.3 Santa Cruz in the United States
  - Pro winners: (New Zealand) Braden Currie (m) / (United States) Liz Lyles (f)
- September 10: 2017 Ironman 70.3 Lake Placid in the United States
  - Pro winners: (United States) Jake Saunders (m) / (United States) Amy Farrell (f)
- September 10: 2017 Ironman 70.3 Rügen in Germany
  - Pro winners: (Germany) Patrick Lange (m) / (Germany) Anja Beranek (f)
- September 17: 2017 Ironman 70.3 Weymouth in United Kingdom
  - Pro winners: (South Africa) James Cunnama (m) / (Belgium) Katrien Verstuyft (f)
- September 17: 2017 Ironman 70.3 Pula in Croatia
  - Pro winners: (Germany) Stefan Haubner (m) / (Austria) Anna Przybilla (f)
- September 17: 2017 Ironman 70.3 Atlantic City in the United States
  - Pro winners: (United States) Kiley Austin-Young (m) / (United States) Sharon Schmidt-Mongrain (f)
- September 24: 2017 Ironman 70.3 Superfrog in (United States) Imperial Beach, California
  - Pro winners: (United States) Brett King (m) / (United States) Meaghan Praznik (f)
- September 24: 2017 Ironman 70.3 Cozumel in Mexico
  - Pro winners: (New Zealand) Terenzo Bozzone (m) / (Canada) Stephanie Roy (f)
- September 24: 2017 Ironman 70.3 Augusta in the United States
  - Pro winners: (United States) Jesse Thomas (m) / (United States) Sarah True (f)
- October
- October 1: 2017 Ironman 70.3 Rio de Janeiro in Brazil
  - Pro winners: (Brazil) Paulo Roberto Maciel da Silva (m) / (Brazil) Pâmella Oliveira (f)
- October 15: 2017 Ironman 70.3 Turkey in Belek
  - Pro winners: (South Africa) Jeren Seegers (m) / (Belgium) Sara van de Vel (f)
- October 21: 2017 Ironman 70.3 North Carolina in (United States) Wilmington
  - Pro winners: (United States) Tom Clifford (m) / (United States) Lisa Becharas (f)
- October 21: 2017 Ironman 70.3 Coquimbo in Chile
  - Pro winners: (Brazil) Santiago Ascenco (m) / (Brazil) Luãza Cravo (f)
- October 22: 2017 Ironman 70.3 Arizona in (United States) Tempe
  - Pro winners: (United States) Paul Stevenson (m) / (Switzerland) Sophie Chevrier (f)
- October 22: 2017 Ironman 70.3 New Orleans in the United States
- October 22: 2017 Ironman 70.3 Miami in the United States
  - Pro winners: (Brazil) Igor Amorelli (m) / (Australia) Ellie Salthouse (f)
- October 29: 2017 Ironman 70.3 Waco in the United States
- October 29: 2017 Ironman 70.3 Austin in the United States
  - Pro winners: (Germany) Franz Loeschke (m) / (United States) Sarah True (f)
- November
- November 11: 2017 Ironman 70.3 Langkawi in Malaysia
  - Pro winners: (Australia) Rob Shannon (m) / (Australia) Melissa Bittner (f)
- November 12: 2017 Ironman 70.3 Los Cabos in Mexico
  - Pro winners: (New Zealand) Terenzo Bozzone (m) / (South Africa) Jeanni Seymour (f)
- November 12: 2017 Ironman 70.3 Xiamen in China
  - Pro winners: (Australia) Sam Betten (m) / (Republic of Ireland) Eimear Mullan (f)
- November 25: 2017 Ironman 70.3 Middle East Championship in (Bahrain) Manama
  - Pro winners: (Norway) Kristian Blummenfelt (m) / (United Kingdom) Holly Lawrence (f)
- November 26: 2017 Ironman 70.3 Fortaleza in Brazil
  - Pro winners: (Brazil) José Belarmino (m) / (Brazil) Claudia Dumont (f)
- November 26: 2017 Ironman 70.3 Thailand in Phuket City
  - Pro winners: (Germany) Markus Rolli (m) / (Switzerland) Imogen Simmonds (f)
- November 26: 2017 Ironman 70.3 Asia-Pacific Championship in (Australia) Western Sydney
  - Pro winners: (Australia) Dan Wilson (m) / (Australia) Melissa Hauschildt (f)
- November 26: 2017 Ironman 70.3 Punta del Este in Uruguay
  - Pro winners: (Brazil) Kid Walter Tlaija (m) / (Peru) Andrea Castillo Sarmiento (f)
- December
- December 3: 2017 Ironman 70.3 Western Australia in Busselton
  - Pro winners: (Australia) Owain Matthews (m) / (Australia) Caroline Anderson (f)
- December 3: 2017 Ironman 70.3 Cartagena in Colombia
  - Pro winners: (United States) Kevin Collington (m) / (Colombia) Diana Castillo (f)
- December 9: 2017 Ironman 70.3 Taupō in New Zealand
  - Pro winners: (New Zealand) Mike Phillips (m) / (New Zealand) Amelia Rose Watkinson (f)
