= Flemish Sportsjewel =

The Flemish Sportsjewel is an annual award given to a Flemish sportsperson or -team, either following a remarkable achievement or at the end of an exceptional career in sports.

Each individual can only win the award once during his or her career, making this trophy one of the most prestigious in Flemish sports. The trophy is awarded by the Flemish Administration represented by the Flemish Minister for Sport, and was first handed out in 1982.

== Winners ==
Year	Winner	Sport
2025	Isaac Kimeli	Athletics
2024	Bashir Abdi	Athletics
2023	Lotte Kopecky	Cycling
2022	Remco Evenepoel	Cycling
2021	Belgium men's national field hockey team	Field hockey
2020	not awarded	
2019	Emma Meesseman	Basketball
2018	Nina Derwael	Gymnastics
2017	Seppe Smits	Snowboarding
2016	Peter Genyn	Athletics
2015	Jaouad Achab	Taekwondo
2014	Bart Swings	Speed skating
2013	Frederik Van Lierde	Triathlon
2012	Hans Van Alphen and Marieke Vervoort	Athletics
2011	Evi Van Acker	Sailing
2010	Cédric Van Branteghem	Athletics
2009	Tom Goegebuer	Weightlifting
2008	Kenny De Ketele	Madison
2007	Women's 4×100 metres relay team	Athletics
2006	Tia Hellebaut	Athletics
2005	Kathleen Smet	Triathlon
2004	Gino De Keersmaeker	Discus throw
2003	Benny Vansteelant	Duathlon
2002	Kim Gevaert	Athletics
2001	Kim Clijsters	Tennis
2000	Filip Meirhaeghe	Mountainbike
1999	Marleen Renders	Athletics
1998	Sven Nys	Cyclo-cross
1997	Stefan Everts	Motocross
1996	Luc Van Lierde	Triathlon
1995	Frédérik Deburghgraeve	Swimming
1994	Brigitte Becue	Swimming
1993	Gella Vandecaveye	Judo
1992	Annelies Bredael	Rowing
1991	Sabine Appelmans	Tennis
1990	Ulla Werbrouck	Judo
1989	not awarded	
1988	Robert Van de Walle	Judo
1987	Wim Van Belleghem	Rowing
1986	William Van Dijck	Athletics
1985	not awarded	
1984	Ingrid Berghmans	Judo
1983	Eddy Annys	High jump
1982	Annie Lambrechts	Roller-skating

== See also ==
- Belgian Sportsman of the year
- Belgian Sports Personality of the Year
