= Luc Van Lierde =

Belgian triathlete

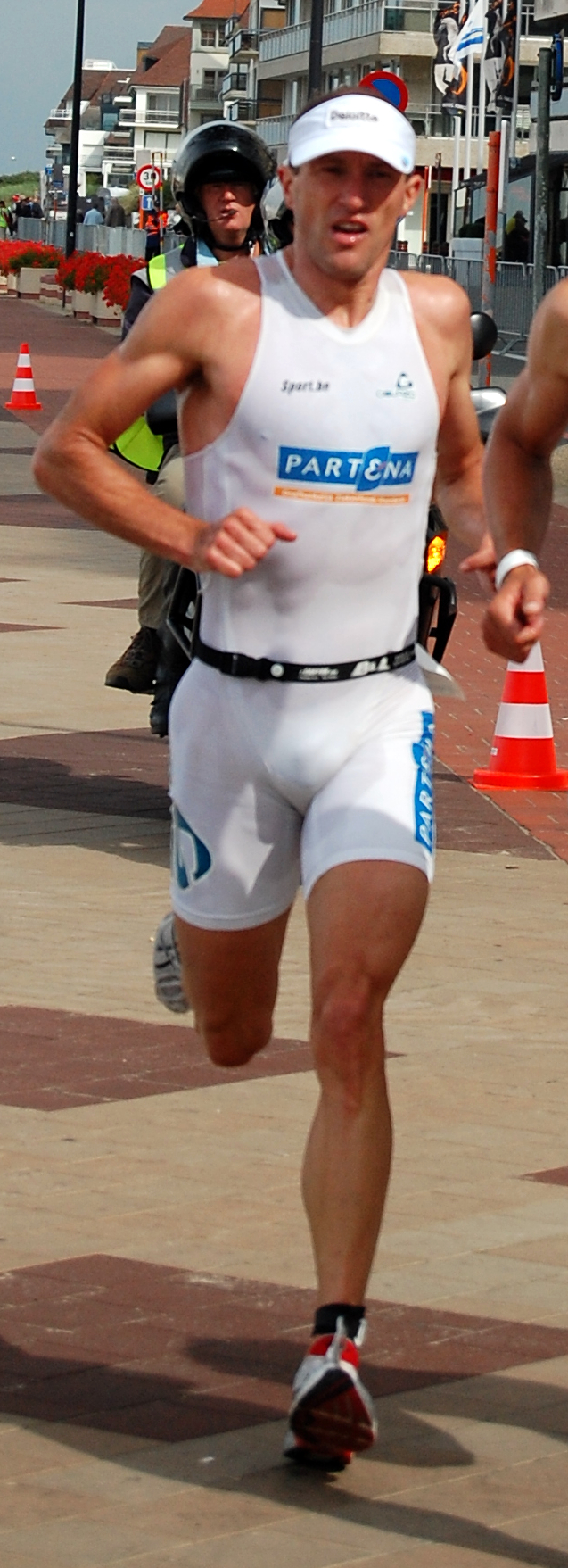
- Van Lierde at the Knokke triathlon, 2 September 2008

Personal information
- Born: 14 April 1969 (age 57) Bruges, Belgium

Sport
- Country: Belgium
Medal record
Representing Belgium
Men's triathlon
ITU Triathlon World Championships
Silver medal – second place	1996 Cleveland	Elite men's race
ITU Long Distance World Championships
Gold medal – first place	1997 Nice	Elite men's race
Gold medal – first place	1998 Sado Island	Elite men's race
Silver medal – second place	1995 Nice	Elite men's race
Silver medal – second place	1996 Muncie	Elite men's race
Ironman World Championship
Gold medal – first place	1996	Men's race
Gold medal – first place	1999	Men's race
Silver medal – second place	1998	Men's race

Luc Van Lierde (born 14 April 1969 in Bruges) is a former athlete from Belgium, who has been competing in triathlon since 1990 and who has been a professional triathlon coach since 2009.

== Athletic career ==
Van Lierde's international career started in 1990 when he came fourth in the World Olympic Distance Triathlon Championships. In the full-length Ironman triathlon, which involves swimming 3.8 km, cycling 180 km and running a 42.2 km marathon, he was ranked among the first ten in the European Championships three times between 1990 and 1995. 1995 was a decisive year for Luc Van Lierde, when he took second place at the ITU World Championships, and came second in the European Olympic Distance Triathlon Championships.

In 1996 he won the European Championships and came second in the World Championships in the Olympic Distance Triathlon. He won the Nice Triathlon and became World Long Course Triathlon Champion. Luc Van Lierde became the first European ever to win the Ironman World Championship, beating the existing record by three minutes.

Luc Van Lierde went on to clock the fastest Ironman Triathlon ever in 1997, doing 7:50:27 (0:44, 4:28, 2:36, plus transition) in Ironman Europe. Absent from the Ironman 1998, after undergoing an operation, he nevertheless won the Flemish Sports Personality of the Year trophy. In 1999, he once again won the Ironman World Championship in Hawaii, outrunning the second placed competitor by six minutes. During that same year, he received the Giant of Flanders trophy awarded by the two Flanders section of the Association of Professional Journalists.

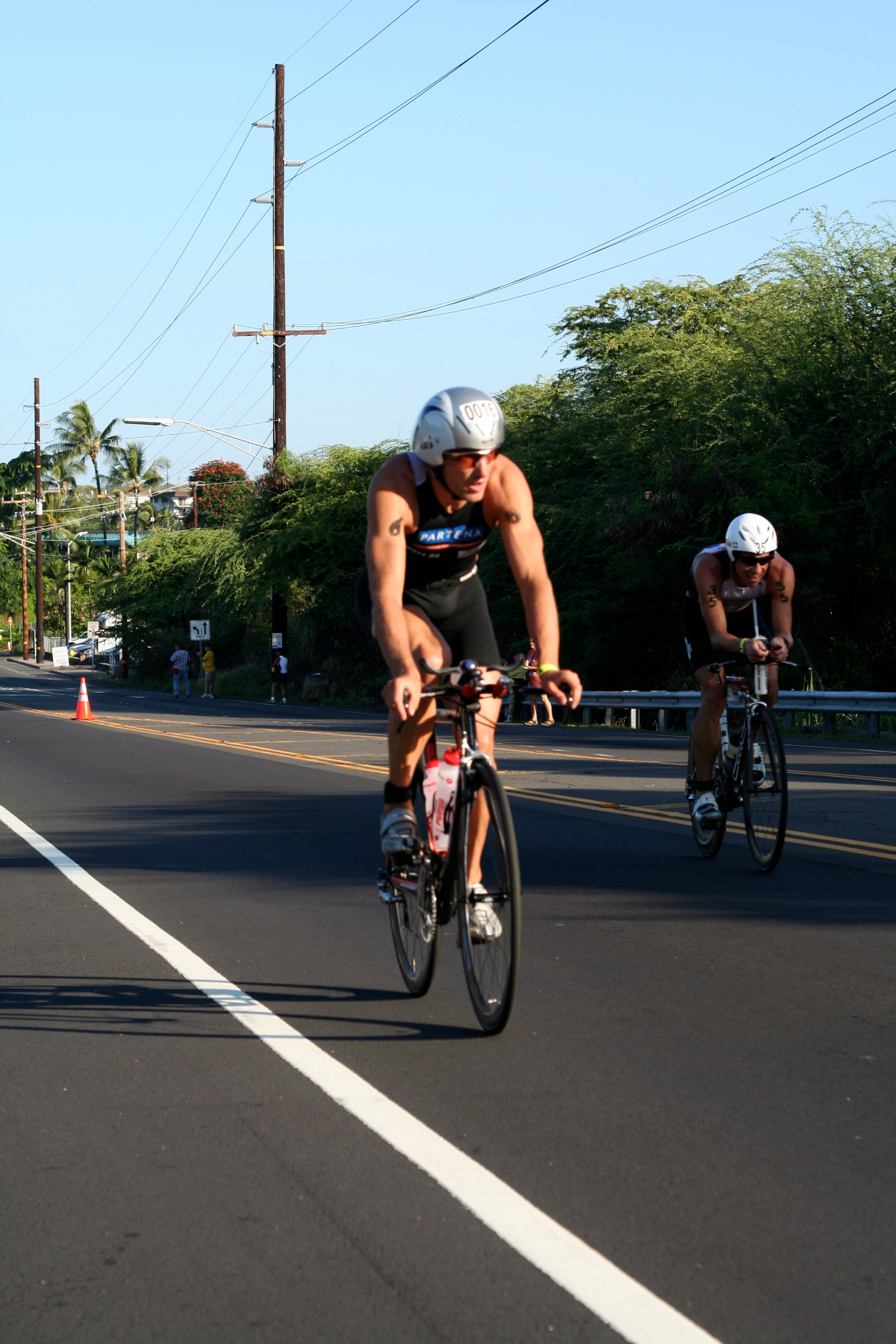
Van Lierde during the 2007 Ironman

== Triathlon coach ==
In 2009, after more than 20 years as a professional triathlete, Van Lierde began a career as a triathlon coach. Frederik Van Lierde (not related) approached Van Lierde with the request to coach him. One year later he managed to coach Frederik Van Lierde to a third place at the 2012 Ironman World Championship. In 2013, he coached Frederik to the 2013 Ironman World Championship.

Van Lierde has successfully coached several other professional athletes, including Marino Vanhoenacker, Iván Raña, Will Clarke, Michelle Vesterby, and Saleta Castro.

== Notable achievements ==
- 1995: Silver medal at the World Triathlon Long Distance Championships, Nice
- 1995: Silver medal at the Europe Triathlon Championships, Stockholm
- 1996: Winner Ironman World Championship, Hawaii (new record; 8:04.08)
- 1996: Winner European Triathlon Championship, Szombathely
- 1996: Winner Triathlon International de Nice
- 1996: Silver medal at the World Triathlon Long Distance Championships, Muncie
- 1996: Silver medal at the World Championships in the Quarter Triathlon
- 1997: Gold medal at the World Triathlon Long Distance Championships, Nice
- 1997: Winner Ironman Europe, Nice (7:50:27, world record for Ironman event)
- 1998: Gold medal at the World Triathlon Long Distance Championships, Sado Island
- 1998: Second at the Ironman World Championship, Hawaii
- 1999: Winner Ironman World Championship, Hawaii (8:17.17)
- 2000: Winner St. Croix Triathlon (2k/55k/12k)
- 2000: Winner Superman Triatlon, Flanders
- 2003: Winner Ironman Malaysia (8:31.16)
- 2004: Winner Ironman Malaysia (8:48.02)
- 2006: 3rd at the Ironman 70.3 Monaco
- 2007: 2nd at the Ironman Lanzarote
- 2007: 8th Ironman Hawaii
- 2008: 2nd at the IronMan 70.3 Antwerp
- 2009: Winner Vienna City Triathlon

== Honors and awards ==
- Flemish Sportsjewel: 1996
- Vlaamse Reus: 1996, 1997, 1999
- Belgian Sportsman of the Year: 1997, 1999
- Belgian National Sports Merit Award: 1997
- Belgian Sports Personality of the Year: 1999
- Honorary citizen of Menen: 2013
