= Vlaamse Reus =

Flemish award

The Vlaamse Reus (literal translation: Flemish Giant) is an award given to a Flemish person active in sports. Whereas until 2022, it rewarded an individual's great sporting achievements, from 2023 onwards, it rewards individuals active in sports showing a great personality, in this way setting itself apart from other sporting awards in Flanders and Belgium. The award's name is a wordplay on the Flemish Giant rabbit. The award is given every year by the "Vlaamse Bond van Sportjournalisten en -fotografen (VBS)" (Flemish Union of Sports journalists and photographers), with only the Flemish sports journalists and photographers eligible to vote for the winner.

From 2023 onwards, the VBS has created and handed out two additional trophies simultaneously with the Vlaamse Reus: the Sports Journalist of the Year and the Sports Photographer of the year.

Until 2023, the award itself was a sculpture created by Willem Vermandere and from 2024 onwards, a sculpture by ex-judoka Heidi Rakels. Sabine Appelmans was the first person to win the prize. Three athletes won the prize three times: Luc Van Lierde, Kim Gevaert en Kim Clijsters.

== Winners Vlaamse Reus ==
Year	Winner	Sport/function	Nominated
1992	Sabine Appelmans	tennis	
1993	Gella Vandecaveye	judo	
1994	Frédérik Deburghgraeve	swimming	
1995	Johan Museeuw	cycling	
1996	Luc Van Lierde	triathlon	
1997	Luc Van Lierde	triathlon	
1998	Frédérik Deburghgraeve	swimming	
1999	Luc Van Lierde	triathlon	
2000	Kim Clijsters	tennis	
2001	Kim Clijsters	tennis	Raymond Ceulemans, Gella Vandecaveye
2002	Kim Gevaert	track and field	Kim Clijsters, Stefan Everts
2003	Marc Herremans	triathlon	Kim Clijsters, Stefan Everts
2004	Kim Gevaert	track and field	
2005	Tom Boonen	cycling	Kim Clijsters, Stefan Everts
2006	Tia Hellebaut	high jump	Stefan Everts, Kim Gevaert
2007	Kim Gevaert	track and field	Sven Nys, Tia Hellebaut
2008	Tia Hellebaut	high jump	Kim Gevaert, Sven Nys
2009	Niels Albert	cyclo-cross	Kim Clijsters, Yanina Wickmayer, Sven Nys, Eline Berings
2010	Kim Clijsters	tennis	Philippe Le Jeune, Jurgen Van den Broeck
2011	Thomas Van Der Plaetsen	decathlon	Sven Nys, Jelle Vanendert
2012	Evi Van Acker	sailing	Tia Hellebaut, Tom Boonen, Sven Nys, Hans Van Alphen, Marieke Vervoort
2013	Frederik Van Lierde	triathlon	Jan Bakelants, Kirsten Flipkens, Sven Nys, Brian Ryckeman, Bart Swings, Frederik Van Lierde
2014	Delfine Persoon	boxing	Sven Nys, Bart Swings, Pieter Timmers, Gert Vande Broek, Greg Van Avermaet
2015	Marieke Vervoort	paralympic athlete	Delfine Persoon, Hein Vanhaezebrouck
2016	Greg Van Avermaet	cycling	Pieter Timmers, Thomas Van der Plaetsen, Peter Genyn, Jolien D'Hoore, Wout Van Aert, Dirk Van Tichelt, Thomas Pieters
2017	Nina Derwael	artistic gymnastics	Greg Van Avermaet, Emma Meesseman
2018	Nina Derwael	artistic gymnastics	Koen Naert, Emma Meesseman, Emma Plasschaert, Bart Swings
2019	Emma Meesseman	basketball	Nina Derwael, Victor Campenaerts, Remco Evenepoel, Bashir Abdi
2020	Wout Van Aert	cycling	Bashir Abdi, Romelu Lukaku, Remco Evenepoel, Kevin De Bruyne
2021	Bashir Abdi	track and field	Miguel Van Damme, Noor Vidts, Matthias Casse, Alexander Hendrickx, Tessa Wullaert
2022	Remco Evenepoel	cycling	Bart Swings, Lotte Kopecky, Wout Van Aert
2023	Patrick Lefevere	cycling	
2024	Jan Vertonghen	football	
2025	Isaac Kimeli	Athletics	Hanne Desmet, Roos Vanotterdijk

== Statistics ==
- Won the award 3 times - Luc Van Lierde (1996, 1997 and 1999), Kim Clijsters (2000, 2001 and 2010), Kim Gevaert (2002, 2004 and 2007)
- Won the award 2 times - Frédérik Deburghgraeve (1994 and 1998), Tia Hellebaut (2006 and 2008), Nina Derwael (2017 and 2018)

== Winners Sport Journalist of the Year ==
Year	Winner	News Medium
2023	Peter Vandenbempt	Sporza
2024	Niels Vleminckx	Het Laatste Nieuws

== Winners Sport Photographer of the Year ==
Year	Winner	News Medium
2023	Yorick Jansens	Belga
2024	Peter De Voecht	Photo News
