= David McNamee (triathlete) =

Scottish triathlete

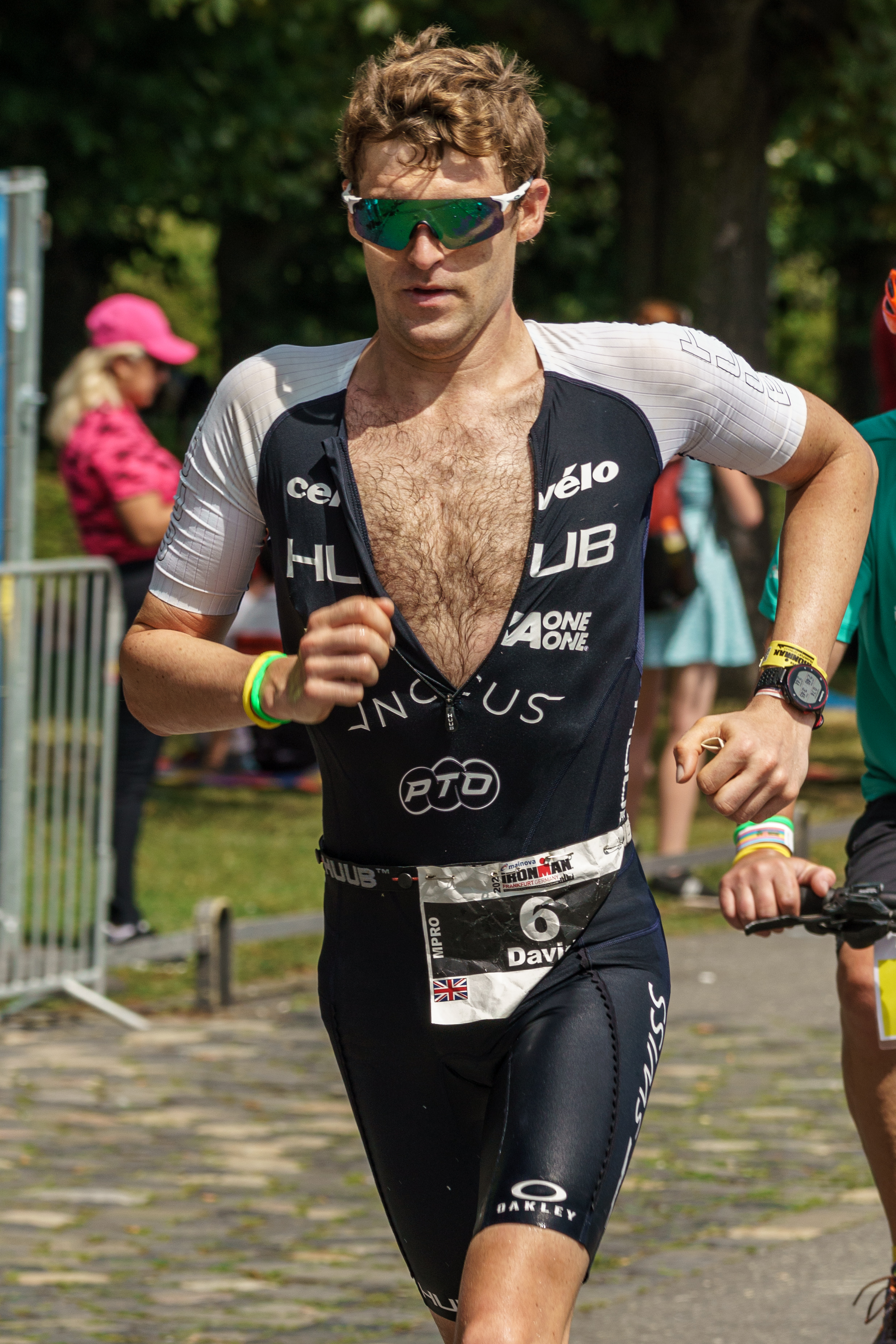
- McNamee in 2021

Personal information
- Born: 20 April 1988 (age 38) Irvine, North Ayrshire, Scotland
- Website: www.davidmcnamee.co.uk

Sport
- Country: Scotland
- Sport: Triathlon
Medal record
Men's triathlon
Representing United Kingdom
Ironman World Championships
Bronze medal – third place	2017 Kailua-Kona	Elite
Bronze medal – third place	2018 Kailua-Kona	Elite

David McNamee (born 20 April 1988) is a Scottish professional long-distance triathlete. He won bronze medals at the 2017 and 2018 Ironman World Championship.
