= Catherine Faux =

British professional triathlete

Catherine Faux is a British professional triathlete.

== 2013 Ironman World Championship ==
Faux finished 10th overall (including professionals) at the 2013 Ironman World Championship and was the top female age grouper. This performance set the course record for a female amateur at 9:15:16.

== Sabbatical and return as a professional ==
Faux broke from triathlon in 2014 to complete two years working as a junior doctor.

She then returned as a professional and made her Ironman debut as a pro in August 2016 at Ironman Vichy where she came first.

== Personal life ==
Faux attended the University of Sheffield where she studied medicine, graduating in 2014.
