= 2013 Ironman World Championship =

2013 triathlon competition

Ironman World Championship
- Location: Kailua-Kona, Hawaii
- Date: October 12, 2013

Champions
- Men: (Belgium) Frederik Van Lierde
- Women: (Australia) Mirinda Carfrae

The 2013 Ironman World Championship was a long distance triathlon competition that was held on October 12, 2013 in Kailua-Kona, Hawaii. The event was won by Belgium's Frederik Van Lierde and Australia's Mirinda Carfrae. It was the 37th edition of the Ironman World Championship, which has been held annually in Hawaii since 1978. The championship is organized by the World Triathlon Corporation (WTC).

== Championship results ==
=== Men ===
Pos.	Time (h:mm:ss)	Name	Country	Split times (h:mm:ss / m:ss)				
Pos.	Time (h:mm:ss)	Name	Country	Swim	T1	Bike	T2	Run
Gold medal	8:12:29	Frederik Van Lierde	Belgium	0:51:02	2:18	4:25:35	2:16	2:51:18
Silver medal	8:15:19	Luke McKenzie	Australia	0:51:17	1:59	4:22:25	2:18	2:57:20
Bronze medal	8:19:24	Sebastian Kienle	Germany	0:54:13	1:49	4:22:33	2:14	2:58:35
4	8:21:46	James Cunnama	South Africa	0:51:13	1:45	4:34:21	1:50	2:52:37
5	8:22:25	Tim O'Donnell	United States	0:51:04	2:05	4:35:37	2:32	2:51:07
6	8:23:43	Iván Raña	Spain	0:51:06	1:55	4:40:34	2:14	2:47:54
7	8:24:09	Tyler Butterfield	Bermuda	0:51:24	1:46	4:30:10	2:27	2:58:22
8	8:25:38	Bart Aernouts	Belgium	0:57:26	1:46	4:39:46	2:37	2:44:03
9	8:26:32	Timo Bracht	Germany	0:51:21	1:50	4:34:46	2:28	2:56:07
10	8:31:13	Faris Al-Sultan	Germany	0:51:19	1:55	4:29:56	2:17	3:05:46

=== Women ===
Pos.	Time (h:mm:ss)	Name	Country	Split times (h:mm:ss / m:ss)				
Pos.	Time (h:mm:ss)	Name	Country	Swim	T1	Bike	T2	Run
Gold medal	8:52:14	Mirinda Carfrae	Australia	0:58:50	2:06	4:58:20	2:20	2:50:38
Silver medal	8:57:28	Rachel Joyce	United Kingdom	0:54:09	2:02	4:55:25	2:15	3:03:37
Bronze medal	9:03:35	Liz Blatchford	United Kingdom	0:54:07	2:01	4:57:40	6:24 (Note: includes 4-minute penalty)	3:03:23
4	9:04:34	Yvonne van Vlerken	Netherlands	1:01:57	1:57	4:54:38	2:37	3:03:25
5	9:09:09	Caroline Steffen	Switzerland	0:54:10	2:07	4:57:50	3:07	3:11:55
6	9:10:12	Caitlin Snow	United States	0:58:47	2:13	5:08:05	2:14	2:58:53
7	9:10:19	Meredith Kessler	United States	0:54:06	2:20	4:55:13	2:05	3:16:35
8	9:11:13	Michelle Vesterby	Denmark	0:54:12	2:07	4:55:53	2:30	3:16:31
9	9:14:47	Gina Crawford	New Zealand	0:54:14	2:21	5:04:17	2:37	3:11:18
10 (Note: place among pro women; Corbin finished 11th among all women behind amateur Catherine Faux, who finished with a time of 9:15:16.)	9:17:22	Linsey Corbin	United States	0:59:19	2:14	5:07:50	3:13	3:04:54

Carfrae broke Chrissie Wellington's course record of 8:54:02 set in 2009. She also lowered her own marathon course record of 2:52:09 set in 2011.

== Qualification ==
For entry into the 2013 World Championship race, amateur athletes were required to qualify through a performance at an Ironman or selected Ironman 70.3 race. Entry into the championship race could also be obtained through a random allocation lottery or through the Ironman’s charitable eBay auction. The division of athletes was divided into professional, age group, physically challenged, and hand cycle divisions.

For professional triathletes, the 2013 championship season marked the third year of a point system that determined which professional triathletes would qualify for the championship race. To qualify, points were earned by competing in WTC sanctioned Ironman and Ironman 70.3 events throughout the qualifying year. For the 2013 championship race that period is September 1, 2012 to August 31, 2013. The top 50 male and top 35 female pros in points at the end of the qualifying year qualified to race in Kona. An athlete's five highest scoring races were counted in the point totals. At least one Ironman race must have been completed and only three Ironman 70.3 races count towards an athlete's overall point total. Prior champions received an automatic entry for the Championship race for a period of five years after their last championship performance provided that they competed in at least one full-distance Ironman race during the qualifying year. Their entry did not count toward the number of available qualifying spots.

The Ironman 2013 series consisted of 27 Ironman races plus the 2012 Ironman World Championship which was itself a qualifier for the 2013 Championship.

=== Qualifying Ironmans ===
Date	Event	Location
Sep 9, 2012	Ironman Wisconsin	(United States) Madison, Wisconsin
Sep 16, 2012	Ironman Wales	Tenby, Pembrokeshire, Wales
Oct 13, 2012	Ironman World Championship	(United States) Kailua-Kona, Hawaii
Nov 3, 2012	Ironman Florida	(United States) Panama City Beach, Florida
Nov 18, 2012	Ironman Arizona	(United States) Tempe, Arizona
Nov 25, 2012	Ironman Cozumel	Cozumel, Quintana Roo, Mexico
Dec 9, 2012	Ironman Western Australia	Busselton, Western Australia
Mar 2, 2013	Ironman New Zealand	Taupō, New Zealand
Mar 17, 2013	Ironman Los Cabos	Los Cabos, Mexico
Mar 24, 2013	Ironman Asia Pacific Championship	Melbourne, Australia
Apr 14, 2013	Ironman South Africa	Port Elizabeth, South Africa
May 5, 2013	Ironman Australia	Port Macquarie, New South Wales, Australia
May 18, 2013	Ironman Lanzarote	Puerto del Carmen, Lanzarote, Spain
May 18, 2013	Ironman Texas	(United States) The Woodlands Township, Texas
May 26, 2013	Ironman Brazil	Florianópolis Island, Brazil
Jun 9, 2013	Ironman Cairns	Cairns, Australia
Jun 23, 2013	Ironman France	Nice, France
Jun 23, 2013	Ironman Coeur d'Alene	(United States) Coeur d'Alene, Idaho
Jun 30, 2013	Ironman Austria	Klagenfurt, Austria
Jul 7, 2013	Ironman European Championship	Frankfurt, Germany
July 21, 2013	Ironman UK	Bolton, Greater Manchester, United Kingdom
Jul 28, 2013	Ironman Switzerland	Zürich, Switzerland
Jul 28, 2013	Ironman Lake Placid	(United States) Lake Placid, New York
Aug 17, 2013	Ironman Sweden	Kalmar, Sweden
Aug 18, 2013	Ironman Copenhagen	Copenhagen, Denmark
Aug 18, 2013	Ironman Mont-Tremblant	Mont-Tremblant, Quebec, Canada
Aug 25, 2013	Ironman Louisville	(United States) Louisville, Kentucky
Aug 25, 2013	Ironman Canada	Whistler, British Columbia, Canada

=== 2013 Ironman Series results ===
==== Men ====
Event	Gold	Time	Silver	Time	Bronze	Time	Reference
Wisconsin	Ben Hoffman (USA)	8:32:51	Eduardo Sturla (ARG)	8:46:29	Michael Göhner (GER)	8:54:53	
Wales	Sylvain Rota (FRA)	8:52:43	Daniel Niederreiter (AUT)	8:55:20	Christian Ritter (GER)	8:58:49	
World Champs 2012	Pete Jacobs (AUS)	8:18:37	Andreas Raelert (GER)	8:23:40	Frederik Van Lierde (BEL)	8:24:09	
Florida	Andrew Starykowicz (USA)	8:06:17	Jan Raphael (GER)	8:08:49	Scott DeFilippis (USA)	8:09:33	
Arizona	Nils Frommhold (GER)	8:03:16	Paul Matthews (AUS)	8:05:01	T. J. Tollakson (USA)	8:07:39	
Cozumel	Iván Raña (ESP)	8:15:07	Bas Diederen (NED)	8:20:42	Bert Jammaer (BEL)	8:24:51	
Western Australia	Jimmy Johnsen (DEN)	8:29:06	Horst Reichel (GER)	8:34:49	Matty White (AUS)	8:38:05	
New Zealand	Bevan Docherty (NZL)	8:15:34	Marko Albert (EST)	8:25:30	Cameron Brown (NZL)	8:34:28	
Los Cabos	Timo Bracht (GER)	8:26:48	Trevor Delsaut (FRA)	8:33:26	Jozsef Major (HUN)	8:33:57	
Asia Pacific^{*}	Eneko Llanos (ESP)	7:36:08	Marino Vanhoenacker (BEL)	7:38:59	Craig Alexander (AUS)	7:39:37	
South Africa	Ronnie Schildknecht (SUI)	8:11:24	Cyril Viennot (FRA)	8:19:51	Bas Diederen (NED)	8:20:09	
Australia	Luke Bell (AUS)	8:30:23	Patrick Evoe (USA)	8:42:58	Luke Whitmore (AUS)	9:03:30	
Lanzarote	Faris Al-Sultan (GER)	8:42:40	Miquel Blanchart (ESP)	8:52:08	Kirill Kotsegarov (EST)	9:04:09	
Texas	Paul Amey (GBR)	8:25:06	James Cunnama (RSA)	8:27:35	Ian Mikelson (USA)	8:30:06	
Brazil	Timothy O'Donnell (USA)	8:01:31	Igor Amorelli (BRA)	8:19:39	Stefan Schmid (GER)	8:25:01	
Cairns	Luke McKenzie (AUS)	8:17:43	Tim Berkel (AUS)	8:22:16	Chris McCormack (AUS)	8:32:50	
France	Frederik Van Lierde (BEL)	8:08:59	Bart Aernouts (BEL)	8:12:28	Clemente Alonso McKernan (ESP)	8:35:52	
Coeur d'Alene	Ben Hoffman (USA)	8:17:34	Viktor Zyemtsev (UKR)	8:26:02	T. J. Tollakson (USA)	8:32:11	
Austria	Andreas Raelert (GER)	7:59:51	Maik Twelsiek (GER)	8:11:36	David Pleše (SLO)	8:19:13	
European	Eneko Llanos (ESP)	7:59:58	Jan Raphael (GER)	8:07:19	Bas Diederen (NED)	8:12:07	
UK	Daniel Halksworth (GBR)	8:45:48	Stephen Bayliss (GBR)	8:49:25	Joe Skipper (GBR)	8:51:49	
Switzerland	Ronnie Schildknecht (SUI)	8:33:39	Iván Raña (ESP)	8:40:55	Per Bittner (GER)	8:46:23	
Lake Placid	Andy Potts (USA)	8:43:29	Daniel Fontana (ITA)	8:48:29	Ian Mikelson (USA)	8:51:07	
Sweden	Pedro Gomes (POR)	8:19:30	David Plese (SLO)	8:22:01	Anton Blokhin (UKR)	8:26:09	
Copenhagen	Jens Petersen-Bach (DEN)	8:12:41	Henrik Hyldelund (DEN)	8:13:39	Esben Hovgaard (DEN)	8:16:38	
Mont-Tremblant	Luke Bell (AUS)	8:26:06	Brandon Marsh (USA)	8:31:01	Bert Jammaer (BEL)	8:31:35	
Louisville	Chris McDonald (AUS)	8:21:34	Patrick Evoe (USA)	8:34:16	Thomas Gerlach (USA)	8:41:11	
Canada	Trevor Wurtele (CAN)	8:39:33	Matthew Russell (USA)	8:45:15	Paul Amey (AUS)	8:53:27	

^{*}Swim shortened to 1.5k due to weather conditions.

==== Women ====
Event	Gold	Time	Silver	Time	Bronze	Time	Reference
Wisconsin	Elizabeth Lyles (USA)	9:34:35	Beth Walsh (USA)	9:38:42	Charisa Wernick (USA)	9:43:54	
Wales	Regula Rohrbach (SUI)	9:45:09	Eimear Mullan (IRL)	10:01:32	Carritt, Joanna (GBR)	10:12:34	
World Champs 2012	Leanda Cave (GBR)	9:15:54	Caroline Steffen (SUI)	9:16:58	Mirinda Carfrae (AUS)	9:21:41	
Florida	Yvonne van Vlerken (NED)	8:51:35	Mirinda Carfrae (AUS)	9:05:03	Ashley Clifford (USA)	9:07:34	
Arizona	Linsey Corbin (USA)	9:01:44	Meredith Kessler (USA)	9:06:04	Corrinne Abraham (GBR)	9:15:13	
Cozumel	Mary Beth Ellis (USA)	9:15:38	Sophie De Groote (BEL)	9:15:45	Sonja Tajsich (GER)	9:21:30	
Western Australia	Britta Martin (NZL)	9:13:00	Rebekah Keat (AUS)	9:14:39	Rebecca Hoschke (AUS)	9:19:48	
New Zealand	Meredith Kessler (USA)	9:17:10	Gina Crawford (NZL)	9:20:54	Candice Hammond (NZL)	9:35:52	
Los Cabos	Erika Csomor (HUN)	9:35:34	Michelle Vesterby (DEN)	9:36:31	Lisa Ribes (USA)	9:38:35	
Asia Pacific^{*}	Corinne Abraham (GBR)	8:10:56	Yvonne van Vlerken (AUT)	8:26:40	Caroline Steffen (SUI)	8:31:22	
South Africa	Jessie Donavan (USA)	9:10:58	Jodie Swallow (GBR)	9:17:00	Lucie Reed (CZE)	9:27:07	
Australia	Rebecca Hoschke (AUS)	9:34:55	Ange Castle (AUS)	9:41:38	Jessica Fleming (AUS)	9:50:46	
Lanzarote	Kristin Möller (GER)	9:37:34	Heleen Bij De Vaate (NED)	10:09:31	Saleta Castro (ESP)	10:14:28	
Texas	Rachel Joyce (GBR)	8:49:14	Jennie Hansen (USA)	9:25:35	Kim Schwabenbauer (USA)	9:33:01	
Brazil	Amanda Stevens (USA)	9:05:52	Sara Gross (CAN)	9:08:37	Jessie Donavan (USA)	9:10:28	
Cairns	Liz Blatchford (GBR)	9:19:51	Gina Crawford (NZL)	9:23:14	Stephanie Jones (USA)	9:31:46	
France	Mary Beth Ellis (USA)	9:12:54	Jeanne Collonge (FRA)	9:20:51	Delphine Pelletier (FRA)	9:22:37	
Coeur d'Alene	Heather Wurtele (CAN)	9:16:02	Caitlin Snow (USA)	9:28:35	Uli Brömme (GER)	9:33:02	
Austria	Erika Csomor (HUN)	8:59:31	Asa Lundström (SWE)	9:04:42	Eimear Mullan (IRL)	9:05:46	
European	Camilla Pedersen (DEN)	8:56:01	Jodie Swallow (GBR)	8:58:43	Kristin Möller (GER)	9:01:55	
UK	Lucy Gossage (GBR)	9:29:12	Joanna Carritt (GBR)	10:05:17	Amy Forshaw (GBR)	10:28:27	
Switzerland	Anja Beranek (GER)	9:21:31	Céline Schärer (SUI)	9:28:28	Erika Csomor (HUN)	9:33:17	
Lake Placid	Jennie Hansen (USA)	9:35:06	Katy Blakemore (USA)	9:42:35	Carrie Lester (AUS)	9:47:59	
Sweden	Jodie Swallow (GBR)	8:54:01	Eva Nystrom (SWE)	9:17:56	Britta Martin (NZL)	9:22:18	
Copenhagen	Eva Wutti (AUT)	8:37:36	Daniela Sämmler (GER)	9:02:51	Lucie Reed (CZE)	9:04:08	
Mont-Tremblant	Mary Beth Ellis (USA)	9:07:56	Rebekah Keat (AUS)	9:16:55	Anja Beranek (GER)	9:17:26	
Louisville	Kate Bevilaqua (AUS)	9:29:02	Brooke Brown (CAN)	9:33:46	Whitney Garcia (USA)	9:34:21	
Canada	Uli Bromme (GER)	9:28:13	Lisa Ribes (USA)	9:38:34	Gillian Moody (CAN)	9:49:09	

^{*}Swim shortened to 1.5k due to weather conditions.

== YWC Sports purchase ==
In June 2013, World Triathlon Corporation purchased YWC Sports, a private company that organizes triathlons and endurance sport events in Denmark. YWC Sports was contracted by the Challenge Family, a competing brand of WTC's Ironman races, to produce the long distance triathlon races Challenge Copenhagen and Challenge Aarhus. However, Challenge Family CEO Felix Walchshöfer did not wish to have WTC produce a Challenge licensed event and therefore terminated YWC's agreement stating that the sale to WTC constituted a breach of contract. As a result, the Challenge Copenhagen race, which was scheduled to race in August 2013, was rebranded as Ironman Copenhagen and 50 qualifying spots were offered up for the 2013 Ironman World Championships. Challenge Aarhus was replaced by Ironman 70.3 Aarhus and took place in June 2014.
