= Rachel Joyce (triathlete) =

English triathlete (born 1978)

Personal information
- Nicknames: Joycenator; Rach
- Born: 16 June 1978 (age 48) Mexico City
- Height: 1.63 m (5 ft 4 in)
- Weight: 58 kg (128 lb)

Sport
- Country: Great Britain
- Sport: Triathlon
- Turned pro: 2008
- Coached by: Julie Dibens
Medal record
Representing United Kingdom
Women's triathlon
Ironman Triathlon World Championships
Silver medal – second place	2015 Kailua-Kona	Elite
Silver medal – second place	2013 Kailua-Kona	Elite
Bronze medal – third place	2014 Kailua-Kona	Elite
ITU Long Distance World Championships
Gold medal – first place	2011	Individual

Rachel Joyce (born 16 June 1978) is an English professional triathlete. She is the winner of the 2011 ITU Long Distance Triathlon World Championships and the second-place finisher at the 2013 Ironman World Championship and 2015 Ironman World Championship. She races in primarily long-distance triathlon events, such as Ironman and Ironman 70.3 distances, and has won events such as Ironman Mont Tremblant in 2017 and Challenge Roth in 2012.

== Career ==
Joyce was born in Mexico City and raised in Woodbridge, Suffolk. She participated in a variety of activities growing up including gymnastics and ice skating. In high school, she swam for the Ipswich Swimming Club and competed on a national level, but eventually burned out at age 17. She read politics and law at the University of Birmingham, where she joined the swim team, which had a more social approach to the sport. At university she also competed in her first triathlon. Joyce went on to the College of Law at Guildford and after graduating she went to work for the law firm Taylor Wessing in London as a construction solicitor.

In 2005, while working in London, Joyce continued to train with a masters swimming club. She trained and raced the London Marathon, where she ran a 3:03, and became further interested in endurance sports. Joyce purchased a bike and did some cycle touring in New Zealand. In 2006, she raced more Ironman 70.3 distance races, competing as an amateur in the 25-29 age group. That year she was the overall age group winner at the Ironman Monaco 70.3 race and the 5th place woman overall. She went on to compete at the 2006 Ironman 70.3 World Championship where she won her age group, and had the 12th fastest woman's overall time. The next year she reduced her work hours with her law firm to devote more time to training and to try to make it as a professional triathlete. But 2007 left her sidelined with injuries and illness and she considered abandoning her pursuit of becoming a pro. However, Joyce continued on with professional triathlon in 2008 and resigned from her law firm.

=== Professional triathlete ===
In 2008, Joyce took 5th at Ironman Florida and 6th at Ironman 70.3 UK. The following year she took 2nd and 3rd at Ironman Lanzarote and Ironman South Africa. With the goal of finishing in the top 10, Joyce took 6th place at the 2009 Ironman World Championship. In 2010, she improved her placing with a 5th place at the 2010 Ironman World Championship. She continued to show improved results in 2011, notching a win at Ironman Lanzarote and taking second at Ironman South Africa and Ironman 70.3 Ireland. At the Ironman World Championships that year she missed a podium spot by taking 4th at the race, just behind Leanda Cave. A month later Joyce won the 2011 ITU Long Distance Triathlon World Championships over second place Cave.

There was further success in 2012 as Joyce won Ironman 70.3 Kansas, Ironman 70.3 Muskoka, and Challenge Roth to also claim the European Long Distance Triathlon Championship. She also took second against a strong field of competition at Ironman Melbourne and 5th at the Abu Dhabi International Triathlon. At the 2013 Ironman Texas race, Joyce grabbed her third Ironman win by leading from start to finish and beating the second-place finisher by 36 minutes. That same year, coming into the 2013 Ironman World Championships, Joyce was considered to be among the favorites to win the event. In the race she was leading during the run, but was overtaken midway through the marathon by Mirinda Carfrae. Joyce would hold on to her position to finish second, her highest finish at the championship event. Her finishing time was the 5th fastest women's time in the Championship's history and the fourth woman to have broken 9 hours at the event.

== Results ==
Joyce's notable achievements include:

Results list

Year	Event	Place
2017	2017 Ironman World Championship	20th
2017	Ironman Mont Tremblant	1st
2017	Ironman Canada	4th
2017	Ironman Boulder	1st
2017	Ironman 70.3 St George	4th
2016	Ironman 70.3 Oceanside	7th
2015	2015 Ironman World Championship	2nd
2014	Challenge Bahrain	2nd
2014	2014 Ironman World Championship	3rd
2014	Challenge Roth	2nd
2014	Ironman 70.3 Boulder	1st
2014	Ironman 70.3 Kansas	2nd
2013	Ironman Cozumel	1st
2013	2013 Ironman World Championship	2nd
2013	Ironman Texas	1st
2013	Ironman 70.3 Oceanside	7th
2012	Abu Dhabi International Triathlon	5th
2012	Ironman Melbourne	2nd
2012	Ironman 70.3 Kansas	1st
2012	Challenge Roth	1st
2012	Ironman 70.3 Muskoka	1st
2012	2012 Ironman World Championship	11th
2011	Abu Dhabi International Triathlon	4th
2011	Ironman South Africa	2nd
2011	Ironman Lanzarote	1st
2011	Challenge Kraichgau	3rd
2011	TriStar Estonia	1st
2011	Ironman 70.3 Ireland	2nd
2011	2011 Ironman World Championship	4th
2011	ITU Long Course World Triathlon Championships	1st
2010	Ironman 70.3 Antwerp	2nd
2010	Ironman 70.3 Germany	8th
2010	London Triathlon	9th
2010	2010 Ironman World Championship	5th
2009	Ironman South Africa	3rd
2009	Ironman Lanzarote	2nd
2009	Nokia Windsor Olympic Distance Triathlon	6th
2009	Estonia Half Ironman Distance Triathlon	1st
2009	F3 Olympic Distance Triathlon	1st
2009	2009 Ironman World Championship	6th
2009	Ironman Florida	5th
2009	Ironman 70.3 UK	6th
2009	Ironman 70.3 World Championships	1st (25-29)
2009	Ironman 70.3 Monaco	1st (25-29)
