= Lionel Sanders =

Canadian triathlete

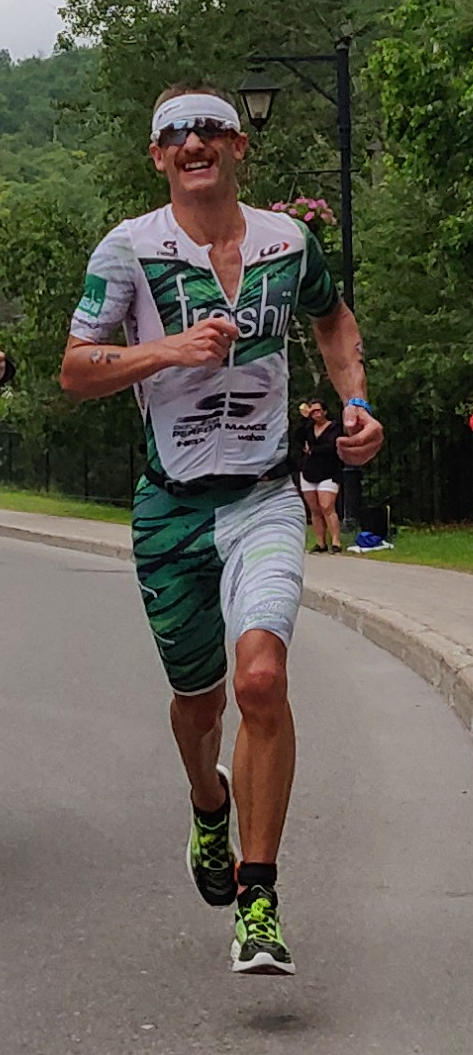
- Sanders at Mont Tremblant 70.3 2018

Personal information
- Full name: Lionel James Sanders
- Born: 22 February 1988 (age 38) Windsor, Ontario, Canada
- Height: 1.78 m (5 ft 10 in)
- Weight: 72 kg (159 lb)

Sport
- Country: Canada
- Sport: Triathlon
- Turned pro: 2013
Medal record
Men's Triathlon
Representing Canada
Ironman World Championship
Silver medal – second place	2017	Individual
Silver medal – second place	2021	Individual
ITU Long Distance Triathlon World Championships
Gold medal – first place	2017	Individual

Lionel James Sanders (born February 22, 1988) is a Canadian professional triathlete winner of the 2017 ITU Long Distance Triathlon World Championships. He has 33 first place finishes in Ironman 70.3 races and 5 first place finishes in full Ironman events. In 2017 and 2022, he placed second at the Ironman World Championship. In 2014 he placed fourth in the 2014 Ironman 70.3 World Championship held in Mont-Tremblant, Quebec. Sanders's first professional race was in September 2013 at the Muskoka Ironman 70.3, where he took 1st place over Andreas Raelert.

== Career ==
Born in Windsor, Ontario, Sanders attended the University of Windsor, and later transferred to McMaster University in Hamilton where he ran for the cross-country running team.

In 2013 Sanders began to race local Ontario Multisport Canada triathlons. Sanders officially began his professional triathlete career in September when he continued his win streak by taking first place in 70.3 Muskoka. The following year Sanders went on to have a successful 2014 Ironman 70.3 season with notable wins at the Ironman 70.3 races in Muncie, Racine and Steelhead. After his 4th-place finish at the 2014 Ironman 70.3 World Championships Sanders finished his first Ironman distance race as a professional at Ironman Florida on November 1, 2014; an event he won. In that race, the swim was cancelled due to poor conditions.

Sanders had a string of 70.3 victories in 2015, combined with some learning experiences at the Ironman distance. At Ironman Texas, Sanders struggled under the oppressive heat & humid conditions, fading on the run and taking fourth. At Ironman Mont Tremblant, Sanders had a disappointing performance, finishing fifth. This was Sanders's first time competing at the Ironman World Championship in Kona, Hawaii where he finished 14th. Sanders went on to Ironman Arizona, finishing with a time under 8 hours to take his first official full distance victory (a year before he won Ironman Florida, however the swim was cancelled).

On November 20, 2016, Sanders set a new world record for the full distance triathlon at Ironman Arizona, with a winning time of 7:44:29. The previous record, held by Marino Vanhoenacker, had stood for five years. Sanders' 2016 Record was broken by Tim Don in 2017 Edition of Ironman Brazil in Florianopolis.

In 2017, Sanders won ITU Long Distance Triathlon World Championships in Penticton, British Columbia, Canada. Sander's won all but one 70.3 race that he entered, the exception being 70.3 St. George, where he finished second to Alistair Brownlee. Sanders led the Ironman World Championship in Kona Hawaii through mile 23 of the marathon before being passed by Patrick Lange. Lionel would hold on to finish second. In 2018 Sanders continued his success, winning most of his races, except Oceanside 70.3, which he lost to Jan Frodeno. In June, he won Challenge Family "The Championship" again against Sebastian Kienle in a time of 3:44 before winning Mont-Tremblant 70.3. In full distance racing, Sanders placed 2nd at Ironman Mont-Tremblant and 29th at the Ironman World Championships.

=== Record attempts ===
On October 23, 2020, Sanders broke the Canadian national hour record with a distance of 51.304 kilometres.

On the 18th of July 2021 Lionel Sanders joined Jan Frodeno in Allgäu, Germany trying to beat the long-distance world record in triathlon. This was a 3.8 km swim, 180 km bike and 42.2 km run. Frodeno broke his own record while Sanders came within eight minutes of the old record while also setting two personal best splits with the swim and the bike. His results were: 50:59 – 4:00:26 – 2:50:31 with a final time of 7:43:28.

== Personal ==
Sanders has been public about the substance abuse problem that eventually led him to sign up for the 2010 Ironman Louisville in late 2009. He finished in a time of 10:14:31. The Hamilton Spectator wrote an in-depth article detailing his substance abuse past and how he will be telling this story for the rest of his life. He was quoted as saying, "I want to prove to anyone who has ever battled addiction that not only can you beat it, but you can turn yourself into something great in the process."

Sanders is married and has a son who was born in 2022.

== Race history ==
=== 2013 ===
Date	Race	Distances	Time	Rank
May 11, 2013	IronHawk Duathlon	5k - 30k - 5k	1:20:37	1st
May 26, 2013	Caledon Sprint Triathlon	400m - 15k - 5k	49:49	1st
June 2, 2013	Ontario Duathlon Champs	10k - 40k - 5k	1:44:09	1st
June 8, 2013	MSC Binbook Triathlon	750m - 30k - 7.5k	1:20:27	1st
June 16, 2013	Ontario Sprint Tri Champs	750m - 20k - 5k	57:21	1st
June 22, 2013	MSC Welland Triathlon	750m 30k - 7.5k	1:19:08	1st
July 6, 2013	MSC Huronia Triathlon	1500m - 40k - 10k	1:58:48	1st
July 13, 2013	MSC Gravenhurst Triathlon	1500m - 40k - 10k	1:59:02	1st
July 21, 2013	Canadian AG Nat.Tri Champs	1500m - 40k - 10k	1:50:54	1st
Aug 11th 2013	Windsor Triathlon	800m - 32k - 6k	1:14:40	1st
Sept 8th 2013	Muskoka Ironman 70.3	2k - 94k -21.1k	4:01:20	1st

=== 2014 ===
Date	Race	Distances	Swim	Bike	Run	Total	Rank
April 6, 2014	Texas 70.3	1.9k - 90k - 21.1k	27:38	2:13:36	1:12:08	3:56:19	10th
May 3, 2014	St. George 70.3	1.9k - 90k - 21.1k	26:58	2:12:40	1:12:18	3:55:07	18th
May 10, 2014	Ontario Sprint Duathlon Champs	750m - 20k - 5k				56:00	1st
May 25, 2014	Woodstock Sprint Triathlon	750m - 20k - 5k	11:14	29:11	15:58	57:33	1st
June 1, 2014	Raleigh 70.3	1.9k - 90k - 21.1k	27:34	2:12:51	1:09:56	3:52:47	2nd
June 7, 2014	Binbrook Long-Sprint Triathlon	750m - 30k - 7.5k	11:02	42:53	24:47	1:19:39	1st
June 22, 2014	Syracuse 70.3	1.9k - 90k - 21.1k	26:28	2:16:27	1:09:54	3:55:43	2nd
July 6, 2014	Ontario Sprint Tri Champs	750m - 20k - 5k				58:15	1st
July 12, 2014	Muncie 70.3	1.9k - 90k - 21.1k	26:31	2:02:20	1:10:54	3:42:48	1st
July 20, 2014	Racine 70.3	1.9k - 90k - 21.1k	27:41	2:05:17	1:09:36	3:45:55	1st
July 27, 2014	Bala Falls Long-Sprint Triathlon	750m - 30k - 7.5k	10:24	40:55	25:52	1:18:26	1st
Aug. 10th 2014	Steelhead 70.3	1.9k - 90k - 21.1k	29:42	2:00:41	1:12:36	3:46:13	1st
Sept. 7th 2014	70.3 World Championship	1.9k - 90k - 21.1k	26:42	2:04:14	1:11:21	3:46:03	4th
Sept. 13th 2014	Lakeside Sprint	750m - 20k - 5k	10:52	27:46	16:24	56:20	1st
Sept. 21st 2014	Ontario Long Course Champs	1.9k - 92.8k - 21.1k	28:45	2:01:26	1:11:35	3:44:55	1st
Nov. 1st 2014	Ironman Florida	180k - 42.2k		4:12:46	2:44:12	6:58:46	1st

=== 2015 ===
Date	Race	Distances	Swim	Bike	Run	Total	Rank
March 28, 2015	Oceanside 70.3	1.9k - 90k - 21.1k	26:59	2:04:46	1:13:12	3:49:19	3rd
April 26, 2015	Galveston 70.3	1.9k - 90k - 21.1k	28:23	2:02:25	1:12:20	3:45:39	1st
May 9, 2015	Ironhawk Duathlon	5k - 20k - 2.5k	15:46	27:29	7:57	52:14	1st
May 16, 2015	Ironman Texas	3.8k - 180k - 42.2k	57:19	4:11:25	3:11:22	8:24:54	4th
June 14, 2015	Leamington Sprint Tri	750m - 20k - 5k	10:33	26:23	16:16	54:43	1st
June 21, 2015	Mont Tremblant 70.3	1.9k - 90k - 21.1k	26:58	2:03:21	1:11:14	3:45:38	1st
July 5, 2015	Muskoka 70.3	1.9k - 94k - 21.1k	27:50	2:16:08	1:15:39	4:02:54	1st
July 19, 2015	Racine 70.3	1.9k - 90k - 21.1k	26:21	2:03:53	1:15:46	3:49:41	1st
Aug 9th 2015	Tecumseh Triathlon	800m - 32k - 6k	13:01	40:40	21:53	1:16:35	1st
Aug 16th 2015	Ironman Mont Tremblant	3.8k - 180k - 42.2k	56:27	4:40:32	3:00:37	8:42:13	5th
Oct 10th 2015	Ironman World Championship	3.8k - 180k - 42.2k	1:01:10	4:35:17	2:54:41	8:36:26	14th
Nov 15th 2015	Ironman Arizona	3.8k - 180k - 42.2k	54:04	4:13:38	2:47:07	7:58:22	1st

=== 2016 ===
Date	Race	Distances	Swim	Bike	Run	Total	Rank
Jan 31st 2016	Panama 70.3	1.9k - 90k - 21.1k	24:35	1:55:03	1:14:48	3:38:53	1st
April 2, 2016	Oceanside 70.3	1.9k - 90k - 21.1k	26:33	2:07:47	1:11:42	3:51:17	1st
April 10, 2016	Texas 70.3	1.9k - 90k - 21.1k	26:57	1:58:09	1:13:09	3:40:30	1st
May 7, 2016	St. George 70.3	1.9k - 90k - 21.1k	27:39	2:03:57	1:13:30	3:48:18	1st
June 26, 2016	Mont Tremblant 70.3	1.9k - 90k - 21.1k	26:17	2:02:29	1:15:06	3:47:31	1st
July 17, 2016	Racine 70.3	N/A - 50k - 21.1k	N/A	1:02:48	1:17:15	2:20:57	2nd
Aug 7th 2016	Tecumseh Triathlon	800m - 32k - 6k	15:07	42:42	21:47	1:20:49	1st
Aug 14th 2016	Wiesbaden 70.3	1.9k - 90k - 21.1k	26:13	2:20:39	1:09:20	4:00:23	2nd
Sept 4th 2016	70.3 World Championship	1.9k - 90k - 21.1k	25:41	2:06:42	1:10:34	3:47:14	9th
Oct 8th 2016	Ironman World Championship	3.8k - 180k - 42.2k	56:41	4:26:35	3:17:01	8:44:49	29th
Oct 28–30th 2016	Island House Invitational	Multiple Races	N/A	N/A	N/A	3:41:18	10th
Nov 20th 2016	Ironman Arizona	3.8k - 180k - 42.2k	53:45	4:04:38	2:42:31	7:44:29	1st

=== 2017 ===
Date	Race	Distances	Swim	Bike	Run	Total	Rank
January 15, 2017	Pucon 70.3	1.9k - 90k - 21.1k	28:20	2:09:23	1:16:38	4:00:08	1st
March 12, 2017	Buenos Aires 70.3	1.9k - 90k - 21.1k	27:19	1:59:27	1:13:10	3:42:47	1st
April 1, 2017	Oceanside 70.3	1.9k - 90k - 21.1k	25:20	2:05:42	1:14:06	3:50:04	1st
May 6, 2017	St. George 70.3	1.9k - 90k - 21.1k	26:25	2:01:24	1:12:19	3:42:31	2nd
June 3, 2017	Challenge Samorin Championship	1.9k - 90k - 21.1k	24:47	1:56:04	1:14:22	3:40:03	1st
June 11, 2017	Leamington Sprint Triathlon	750m - 20k - 5k	10:41	26:48	16:24	55:10	1st
June 25, 2017	Mont Tremblant 70.3	1.9k - 90k - 21.1k	26:21	2:01:53	1:14:01	3:46:04	1st
Aug 27th 2017	ITU World Championship	3k - 120k - 30k	40:40	2:51:12	1:45:35	5:20:36	1st
Oct 14th 2017	Ironman World Championship	3.8k - 180k - 42.2k	53:41	4:14:19	2:51:53	8:04:07	2nd
Nov 19th 2017	Ironman Arizona	3.8k - 180k - 42.2k	51:33	4:12:03	2:47:16	7:54:10	1st

=== 2018 ===
Date	Race	Distances	Swim	Bike	Run	Total	Rank
January 14, 2018	Pucon 70.3	1.9k - 90k - 21.1k	26:51	2:01:15	1:16:25	3:48:44	1st
April 7, 2018	Oceanside 70.3	1.9k - 90k - 21.1k	24:35	2:08:42	1:11:28	3:48:58	2nd
May 6, 2018	St. George 70.3	1.9k - 90k - 21.1k	25:26	2:01:31	1:11:47	3:41:11	1st
June 3, 2018	Challenge Samorin Championship	1.9k - 90k - 21.1k	29:05	1:58:17	1:10:49	3:44:03	1st
June 24, 2018	Mont Tremblant 70.3	1.9k - 90k - 21.1k	24:15	2:02:19	1:11:23	3:40:58	1st
August 19, 2018	Ironman Mont Tremblant	3.8k - 180k - 42.2k	55:07	4:28:35	2:55:51	8:24:01	2nd
October 13, 2018	Ironman World Championship	3.8k - 180k - 42.2k	53:59	4:16:59	3:15:26	8:30:34	29th

=== 2019 ===
Date	Race	Distances	Swim	Bike	Run	Total	Rank
Aug 11th 2019	Tecumseh Triathlon	800m - 32k - 6k	12:11	43:36	22:31	1:19:24	1st
August 18, 2019	Ironman Mont Tremblant	3.8k - 180k - 42.2k	51:58	4:15:13	2:53:58	8:05:38	2nd
September 9, 2019	Augusta 70.3	1.9k - 90k - 21.1k	23:08	2:03:08	1:12:30	3:42:19	1st
October 12, 2019	Ironman World Championship	3.8k - 180k - 42.2k	52:22	4:15:22	3:13:42	8:25:54	22nd
November 3, 2019	Ironman 70.3 Los Cabos	1.9k - 90k - 21.1k	25:16	2:02:34	1:13:09	3:44:06	1st

=== 2021 ===
Date	Race	Distances	Swim	Bike	Run	Total	Rank
November 6, 2021	Florida Ironman	3.8 k - 180 k - 42.2 k	58:19	4:04:30	2:40:43	7:48:50	2nd

=== 2022 ===
Date	Race	Distances	Swim	Bike	Run	Total	Rank
April, 2022	Oceanside 70.3	1.9 k - 90 k - 21.1 k	24:26	2:08:09	1:08:29	3:45:33	2nd
2022	Mont Tremblant 70.3	1.9 k - 90 k - 21.1 k	25:30	2:05:17	1:13:59	3:48:02	1st
October 8, 2022	Kona 140.6	3.8 k - 180 k - 42.2 k	52:57	4:16:31	3:17:53	8:32:27	36th
December 3, 2022	Indian Wells 70.3	1.9 k - 90 k - 21.1 k	26:53	2:03:04	1:11:01	3:45:16	4th

=== 2023 ===
Date	Race	Distances	Swim	Bike	Run	Total	Rank
May, 2023	St. George 70.3	1.9 k - 90 k - 21.1 k	26:04	2:04:58	1:13:35	3:48:20	4th

=== 2024 ===
Date	Race	Distances	Swim	Bike	Run	Total	Rank
April 8, 2024	Oceanside 70.3	1.9 k - 90 k - 21.1 k	24:36	2:06:11	1:10:40	3:46:24	1st
June 24, 2024	Mont-Tremblant 70.3	1.1 k - 90 k - 21.1 k	16:10	2:01:44	1:13:47	3:35:11	1st
July 21, 2024	Lake Placid 140.6	3.8k - 180k - 42.2k	54:21	4:19:07	2:46:16	8:05:39	3rd
October 26, 2024	Ironman World Championship	3.8k - 180k - 42.2k	52:21	4:08:55	3:16:05	8:22:06	32nd

=== 2025 ===
Date	Race	Distances	Swim	Bike	Run	Total	Rank
April 5, 2025	Oceanside 70.3	1.9 k - 90 k - 21.1 k	26:00	2:05:37	1:10:00	3:47:01	1st
May 10, 2025	St. George 70.3	1.9 k - 90 k - 21.1 k	25:00	1:58:13	1:11:49	3:37:54	1st
December 7, 2025	Indian Wells 70.3	1.9 k - 90 k - 21.1 k	25:27	1:56:41	1:13:10	3:39:16	2nd
