= Belgian Sports Personality of the Year =

Defunct annual sports award of Belgian newspaper Het Nieuwsblad

The Belgian Sports Personality of the Year is a defunct annual sports award that was given out in January by the Belgian newspaper Het Nieuwsblad to the greatest personality in Belgian sports. It was first awarded in 1998 (27 years ago) and last handed out in 2008 (17 years ago). For this award, not only athletes qualified but everyone who was involved in sports, thus including amongst others trainers, coaches and athletes themselves. A person could only win this award once in his career.

== List of winners ==
Year	Winner	Discipline
1998	Dominique Monami	Tennis
1999	Luc Van Lierde	Triathlon
2000	Gella Vandecaveye	Judo
2001	Jacques Rogge	President of the IOC
2002	Marc Herremans	Triathlon
2003	Kim Clijsters	Tennis
2004	Kim Gevaert	Athletics
2005	Tom Boonen	Cycling (road)
2006	Sven Nys	Cycling (cyclo-cross)
2007	Justine Henin	Tennis
2008	Tia Hellebaut	Athletics

== See also ==
- Belgian Sportsman of the year
