= Marieke Vervoort =

Belgian Paralympic athlete (1979–2019)

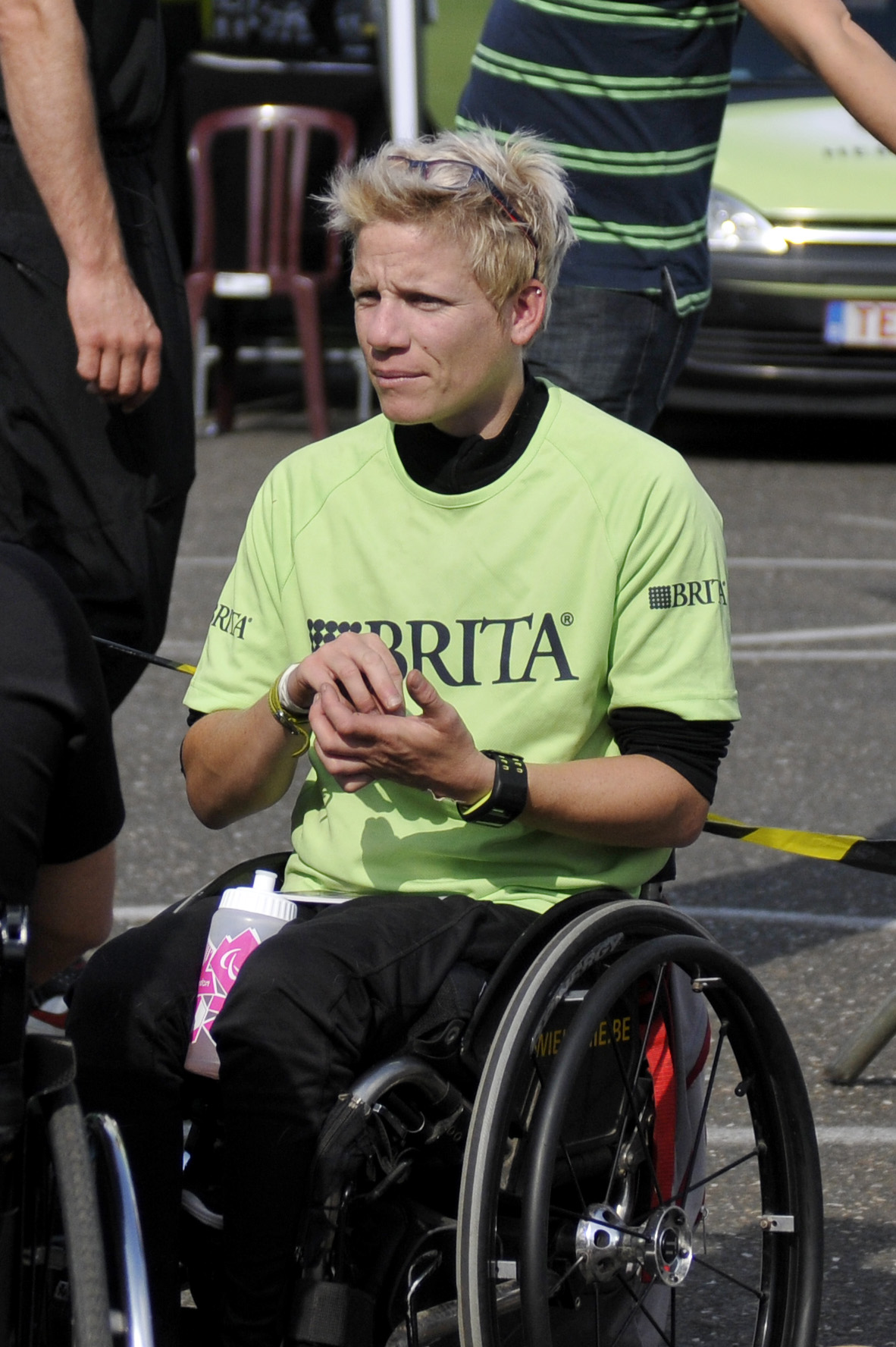
- Vervoort during the Run to walk again event in Tongerlo, September 2012

Personal information
- Nickname: Wielemie
- National team: Belgium
- Born: 10 May 1979 Diest, Belgium
- Died: 22 October 2019 (aged 40) Diest, Belgium

Sport
- Country: Belgium
- Sport: Wheelchair racing
- Disability class: T52
- Events: T52 100m, 200m, 400m, 1,500m, 5,000m
Medal record
Representing Belgium
Women's para-athletics
Paralympic Games
| Gold medal – first place | 2012 London | 100m T52 |
| Silver medal – second place | 2012 London | 200m T52 |
| Silver medal – second place | 2016 Rio de Janeiro | 400m T52 |
| Bronze medal – third place | 2016 Rio de Janeiro | 100m T52 |
IPC World Championships
| Gold medal – first place | 2015 Doha | 100 m T52 |
| Gold medal – first place | 2015 Doha | 200 m T52 |
| Gold medal – first place | 2015 Doha | 400 m T52 |
IPC Grand Prix
| Gold medal – first place | 2015 Nottwil | 200m T52 |
| Gold medal – first place | 2016 Nottwil | 1,500m T52 |
| Gold medal – first place | 2016 Nottwil | 5,000m T52 |
Women's paratriathlon
World Championships
| Gold medal – first place | 2007 Hamburg | AWAD PC1 |

Marieke Vervoort (10 May 1979 – 22 October 2019) was a Belgian Paralympic athlete with reflex sympathetic dystrophy. She won several medals at the Paralympics, and she received worldwide attention in 2016 when she revealed that she was considering euthanasia.

== Career ==
Vervoort began her career in sports playing wheelchair basketball, then took up swimming, and competed in triathlons. She was paratriathlon world champion in 2006 and 2007, and in 2007, competed in the Ironman Triathlon in Hawaii. She retired from triathlons when her condition became worse. Instead, she started blokarting and then wheelchair racing.

External videos
- Vervoort's gold medal run in the T52 100m event in London, YouTube video

In the 2012 London Paralympic Games, she won the gold medal in the T52 100m wheelchair race, and the silver medal in the T52 200m wheelchair race.

In 2013, she set a new European record of 33.65 in the T52 200m race at Oordegem, Belgium. She also set world records in the T52 400m at Kortrijk, Belgium, and the T52 800m at Oordegem in 2013.

The same year, while competing at the IPC Athletics World Championships at Lyon, France, Vervoort fell during the 800m race after a collision with Michelle Stilwell of Canada. She injured her shoulder, requiring surgery and ten months of rehabilitation. Her next competition was in 2014, at the ParAthletics IPC Athletics Grand Prix held at Nottwil, Switzerland, where she won the 200m, as well as the 1,500m and 5,000m, in both of which she set new world records. Later that same year, she suffered another setback. While making pasta, she lost consciousness, accidentally poured hot water over herself and sustained second-degree and third-degree burn wounds from the chest down to her ankles.

At the 2015 IPC Athletics World Championships in Doha, she won gold medals in the T52 100m, 200m and 400m races, and became world champion. She covered 200 meters in 35.91, which was two seconds slower than her European record, prior to her accident.

At the 2016 Rio de Janeiro Paralympic Games, she won the silver medal in the T51/52 400m wheelchair race and bronze in the T51/52 100m.

== Personal life ==
Vervoort began experiencing symptoms at the age of 14 of what would later be diagnosed as reflex sympathetic dystrophy: an incurable degenerative disease of the muscles and spine, which caused severe pain, paralysis in her legs, and made it very difficult for her to sleep. Despite her sporting success, Vervoort said that she was considering euthanasia as she was preparing for the 2016 Rio Paralympics, saying that Rio was her "last wish". She clarified that this did not mean euthanasia would occur immediately after the Games, stating that: "You have to live day-by-day and enjoy the little moments. When the day comes—when I have more bad days than good days—I have my euthanasia papers. But the time is not there yet." She signed her euthanasia papers in 2008. Vervoort also had epilepsy, and lived with her assistance dog, Zenn, who was able to alert her to an upcoming seizure an hour before it occurred.

She died by euthanasia on 22 October 2019. Her decision was supported by other Paralympians, such as Briton Ollie Hynd.

Vervoort was lesbian.

== Writing ==
Vervoort was the author of two books, Wielemie. Sporten voor het leven ("Wielemie. Sports for life") (Houtekiet, 2012), and De andere kant van de medaille ("The other side of the coin") (2017), about her degenerative muscle disease and its impact on her life.

== Honors and recognition ==
- 2012 – Belgian Paralympian of the Year
- 2013 – Grand Officer of the Order of the Crown (Belgium)
- 2014 – National Trophy Victor Boin
- 2015 – Belgian Paralympian of the Year
- 2015 – Vlaamse Reus
- 2016 – Decoration of the Flemish Community from Prime Minister Geert Bourgeois
