= 2017 Ironman World Championship =

Ironman World Championship
- Location: Kailua-Kona, Hawaii
- Date: October 14, 2017

Champions
- Men: (Germany) Patrick Lange
- Women: (Switzerland) Daniela Ryf

The 2017 Ironman World Championship was a long distance triathlon competition held on October 14, 2017, in Kailua-Kona, Hawaii that was won by Patrick Lange of Germany and Daniela Ryf of Switzerland. It was the 41st edition of the Ironman World Championship, which has been held annually in Hawaii since 1978. The championship was organized by the World Triathlon Corporation (WTC). For Ryf it was her third consecutive Ironman World Championship win. This was Lange's first championship win and in doing so he set a new overall course record previously set by Craig Alexander in 2011.

== Championship results ==
=== Men ===
Rank	Time (h:mm:ss)	Name	Country	Split times (h:mm:ss / m:ss)				
Rank	Time (h:mm:ss)	Name	Country	Swim	T1	Bike	T2	Run
1st place, gold medalist(s)	8:01:40	Patrick Lange	Germany	48:45	1:49	4:28:53	2:14	2:39:59
2nd place, silver medalist(s)	8:04:07	Lionel Sanders	Canada	53:41	1:58	4:14:19	2:16	2:51:53
3rd place, bronze medalist(s)	8:07:11	David McNamee	United Kingdom	48:40	2:03	4:28:55	2:03	2:45:30
4	8:09:59	Sebastian Kienle	Germany	53:44	1:58	4:14:57	2:09	2:57:11
5	8:11:24	James Cunnama	South Africa	49:09	2:03	4:21:02	2:16	2:56:46
6	8:13:06	Terenzo Bozzone	New Zealand	48:41	1:58	4:26:20	2:20	2:53:47
7	8:14:43	Andy Potts	United States	49:01	2:04	4:31:02	2:10	2:50:26
8	8:18:21	Patrik Nilsson	Sweden	48:34	1:57	4:29:02	2:57	2:55:51
9	8:19:26	Ben Hoffman	United States	48:52	1:57	4:22:00	2:21	3:04:16
10	8:22:24	Boris Stein	Germany	53:48	1:43	4:23:59	2:12	3:00:42
Source:.

=== Women ===
Rank	Time (h:mm:ss)	Name	Country	Split times (h:mm:ss / m:ss)				
Rank	Time (h:mm:ss)	Name	Country	Swim	T1	Bike	T2	Run
1st place, gold medalist(s)	8:50:47	Daniela Ryf	Switzerland	53:10	2:14	4:53:10	2:11	3:00:02
2nd place, silver medalist(s)	8:59:38	Lucy Charles	United Kingdom	48:48	2:16	4:58:19	2:16	3:08:09
3rd place, bronze medalist(s)	9:01:38	Sarah Crowley	Australia	53:07	2:10	4:57:51	2:54	3:05:36
4	9:02:29	Heather Jackson	United States	57:58	2:11	4:53:54	2:07	3:06:19
5	9:04:40	Kaisa Sali	Finland	57:53	2:18	4:59:50	3:06	3:01:33
6	9:16:00	Susie Cheetham	United Kingdom	57:54	2:04	5:03:27	3:10	3:09:25
7	9:19:49	Carrie Lester	Australia	57:51	2:22	5:00:31	2:30	3:16:35
8	9:20:31	Liz Lyles	United States	1:00:08	2:15	5:04:10	2:37	3:11:21
9	9:20:58	Annabel Luxford	Australia	53:02	2:12	4:59:15	2:23	3:24:06
10	9:21:08	Jocelyn McCauley	United States	54:31	2:22	5:04:34	3:00	3:16:41
