= Sarah Piampiano =

Personal information
- Nicknames: '"Little Red", "Gimpy"
- Born: 24 July 1980 (age 46) Portland, ME
- Height: 1.70 m (5 ft 7 in)
- Weight: 120 lb (54 kg)

Sport
- Country: USA
- Turned pro: 2012
- Coached by: Matt Dixon

Sarah Piampiano (born 24 July 1980) is an American professional triathlete and Ironman Triathlon champion.

Piampiano was working as an investment banker when she participated in her first triathlon in 2009. After quitting smoking, she started regular training and improved quickly. In 2012, she left her full-time position in finance and began competing as a professional under the guidance of Matt Dixon at Purplepatch Fitness, winning 70.3 New Orleans and qualifying for the World Championships in Kona (finishing 23rd) in her first season of professional racing. While racing Ironman Texas in 2014 she suffered a broken femur and spent that summer rehabbing the injury. In 2015, she won Ironman 70.3 New Orleans, finished seventh at the 2015 Ironman World Championship and won Ironman Western Australia.

She currently resides in San Rafael, California.

== Career ==
Piampiano grew up with two older brothers and worked hard to keep up with them. While in high school, she ran cross country and skied downhill, both at a competitive level.

After college, she worked at Thomas Weisel Partners and Morgan Stanley in San Francisco and then HSBC Securities in New York City. She was putting in 90-100+ hour weeks on a regular basis and travelled extensively. As a result of a bet with a colleague she signed up for her first triathlon in 2009 and began training on regular basis in 2010. In 2011, she started working with Matt Dixon of Purplepatch Fitness as her triathlon coach, reduced her work-load to 30 hours per week and achieved success in the amateur ranks. She finished her first Ironman in Coeur d'Alene and was fifth female amateur in Kona. She turned Pro at the end of 2011.

Piampiano's first Pro race was IM Cozumel in November 2011 (7th). She moved to Santa Monica, CA to work with renowned open water swim coach Gerry Rodrigues. In her first season as a Professional she won 70.3 New Orleans which was held as a duathlon, starting with a 2-mile run when the swim was cancelled due to weather conditions. In the same year she also qualified for the Ironman World Championships in Kona by finishing 6th at IM Texas and 4th at IM New York. In Kona, she finished 23rd in the Pro female field. She says that race was one of her most challenging as she was tired after a long season of racing.

In the 2013 season Piampiano raced IM Melbourne in March (9th), IM Austria in June (4th with a new personal best time of 9:07:30) and IM Mont Tremblant in August (10th). She qualified again for Kona, but declined her Kona slot in order to allow her body to recover from the racing and to build for the next season.

Piampiano's 2014 season started well with second-place finishes at 70.3 Pucon and 70.3 New Orleans, but came to an abrupt end at IM Texas in May. Leading up to the race was having issues with her left leg and while an MRI before the race had not shown signs of a stress fracture, she couldn't even complete her warm-up jog before the race. She was in third place during the marathon, but two miles before the finish line her leg gave out on her, and she was reduced to a walk for the last two miles finishing in 10th place. It was later determined that she had broken her femur, and she was forced to take off the remainder of the summer to rehab the injury.

Piampiano returned to racing with a 7th place at 70.3 Miami in October 2014 and went on to finish 8th at Ironman Western Australia in December. In early 2015 she raced a lot of 70.3s, once again winning 70.3 New Orleans, despite dealing with two flats on the bike leg. After racing Ironman Texas (6th) and Ironman Austria (3rd with a new PR of 9:03:10) and despite a DNF at Ironman Mont Tremblant she qualified for an August Kona slot. At the Ironman World Championships in Kona, she was third to last in the female Pro field out of the swim (38th), rode a steady bike ride (moving up to 17th place) and then had the best second-half marathon of the entire women's field to finish in 7th place. She finished the 2015 season by winning her first Ironman race in Western Australia. Similar to her Kona performance, she had a strong 3:01 run, beating second-place finisher Mareen Hufe of Germany by over six minutes.

In her 2016 season, Piampiano defended her 70.3 title in New Orleans as part of her preparation for IM Texas.

== Results ==
Piampiano's notable Professional results include:

Results list

Year	Event	Time	Place
2016	70.3 New Orleans	4:19:57	1
2016	70.3 Monterrey	4:17:24	4
2015	IM Western Australia	9:03:47	1
2015	IM Hawaii	9:24:32	7
2015	IM Mont Tremblant	DNF	
2015	IM Austria	9:03:10	3
2015	70.3 Eagleman	4:29:45	3
2015	IM Texas	9:13:47	6
2015	70.3 Texas	4:20:19	5
2015	70.3 New Orleans	4:15:17	1
2015	70.3 California	4:26:19	8
2015	70.3 Monterrey	4:11:03	2
2015	70.3 South Africa	5:08:55	6
2014	IM Western Australia	9:12:38	8
2014	70.3 Miami	4:27:32	7
2014	IM Texas	9:38:56	10
2014	70.3 St. George	4:26:08	8
2014	70.3 New Orleans	4:22:35	2
2014	70.3 Texas	4:11:57	3
2013	IM Arizona	9:05:57	4
2013	70.3 Austin	4:21:24	4
2013	IM Mont Tremblant	9:41:58	10
2013	IM Austria	9:07:30	4
2013	IM Melbourne	8:44:52	9
2012	IM Hawaii	10:04:51	23
2012	70.3 World Championship	5:05:04	24
2012	IM New York	9:30:29	4
2012	IM Texas	9:47:38	6
2012	70.3 New Orleans	3:43:58	1
2011	IM Cozumel	9:57:58	7
