= Saleta Castro =

Spanish triathlete

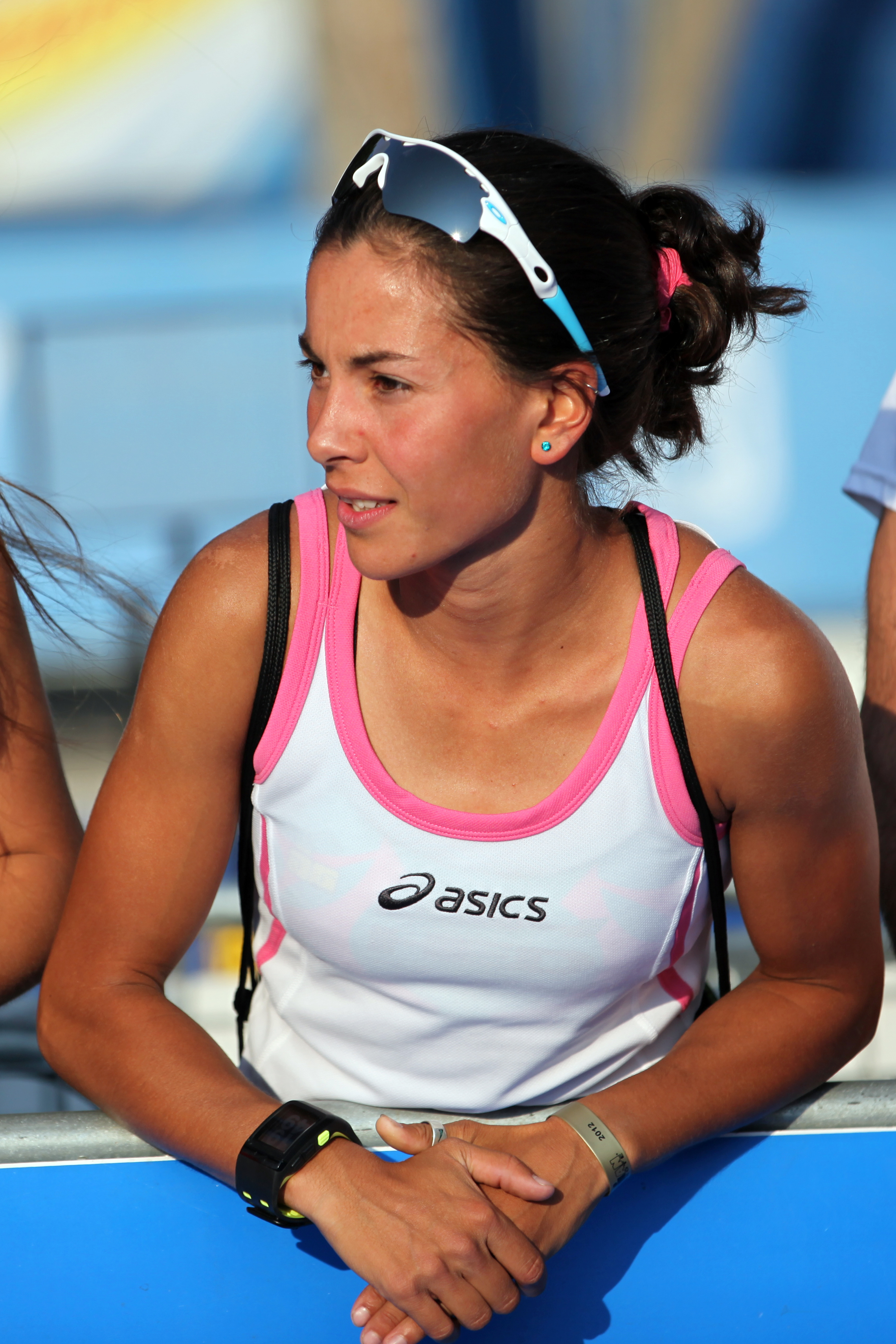
Saleta Castro as a spectator at the World Triathlon Series in Madrid, 2012.

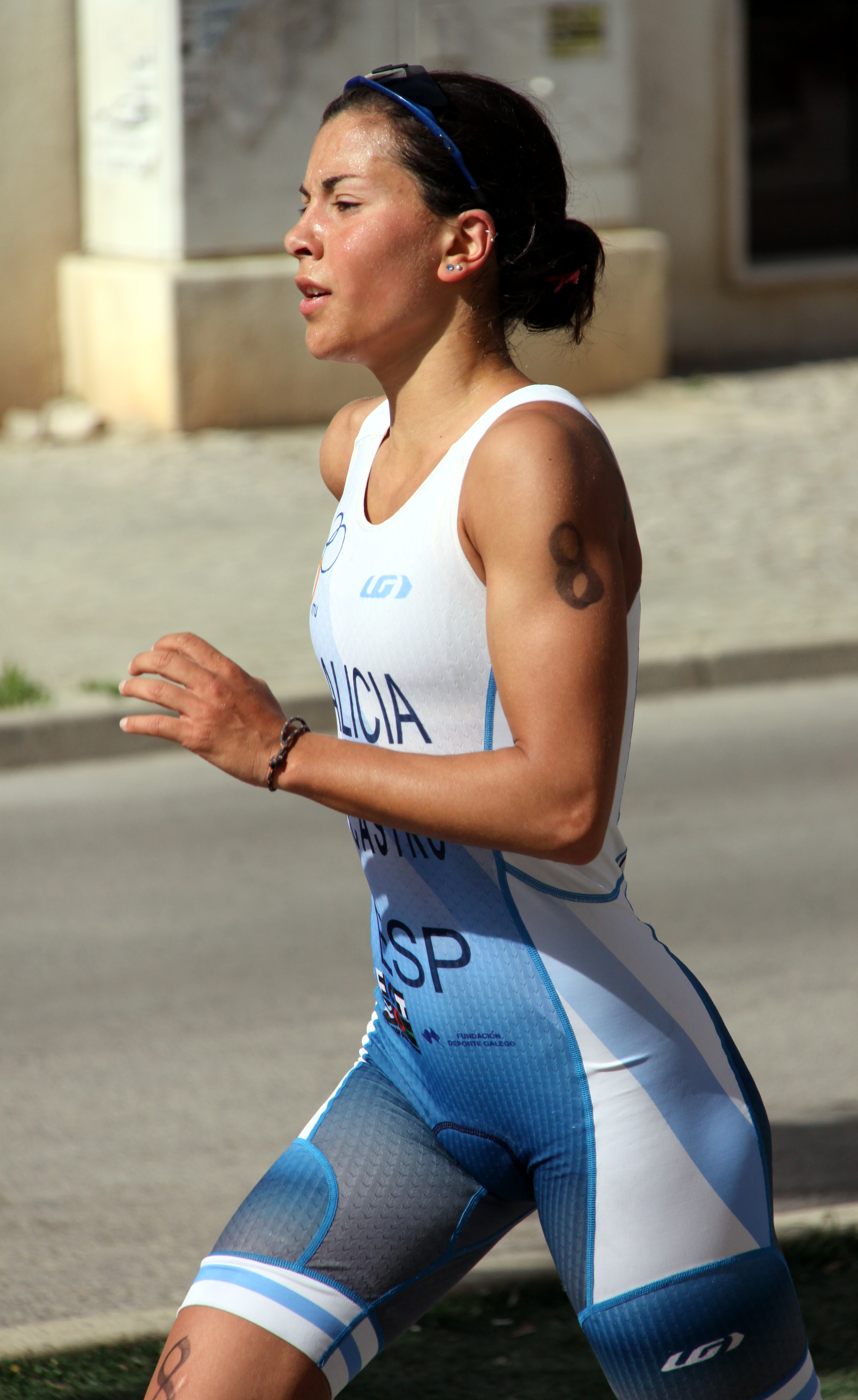
Saleta Castro at the European Cup in Quarteira, 2010.

(María) Saleta Castro Nogueira (born 3 November 1987, Pontevedra, Spain), is a Spanish, Galician, professional triathlete, National U23 Triathlon (Olympic Distance) and National Elite Long Distance Champion of the year 2010.

In 2003, at the age of 15, she took part in her first ITU competition and placed fifth at the European Youth Team Championships in Győr (20 July 2003).

In 2009 Saleta Castro was number 1 in the Spanish Elite ranking although she had taken part in only three of the ten circuit events. At the Galician U23 Championships she placed second and at the Elite Championships she placed third .

In 2010 Saleta Castro was number 3 in the Spanish Elite ranking and won the gold medal at the Galician Elite Championships.

In 2011, Saleta Castro will probably concentrate on Long Distance triathlons since her name is listed among the Spanish Long Distance elite triathletes (DAR = Deportistas Alto Rendimiento 2011).

Saleta Castro represents the Galician club Cidade de Lugo Fluvial. She trains in CGTD with other Spanish triathletes like Aida Valiño, Oscar Vicente, Jesus Gomar.

== ITU Competitions ==
The list is based upon the official ITU rankings and the Athlete's Profile Page. Unless indicated otherwise, all events are triathlons (Olympic Distance) and belong to the Elite Category.

| Date | Competition | Place | Rank |
|---|---|---|---|
| 2005-07-23 | European Championship (Junior Women) | Alexandroupoli(s) | 20 |
| 2005-07-23 | European Championship (Junior Women Relay) | Alexandroupoli(s) | 9 |
| 2006-04-23 | European Cup | Estoril | 22 |
| 2006-05-07 | European Cup | Alexandroupoli(s) | 12 |
| 2006-06-04 | BG World Cup | Madrid | 49 |
| 2006-06-23 | European Championships (Junior) | Autun | 27 |
| 2006-10-08 | European and Pan American Cup and Iberoamerican Championships | Baeza | 10 |
| 2007-05-20 | Premium European Cup | Sanremo | 25 |
| 2007-06-03 | BG World Cup | Madrid | 43 |
| 2007-07-21 | European Championships (U23) | Kuopio | 22 |
| 2008-04-19 | Premium European Cup | Pontevedra | DNF |
| 2008-05-24 | Duathlon European Championships (U23) | Serres | 3 |
| 2008-06-28 | 9th World University Championship | Erdek | 19 |
| 2008-08-03 | European Cup | Egirdir | 10 |
| 2008-08-24 | European Cup and Small States of Europe Championships | Weiswampach | 16 |
| 2008-09-06 | European Championships (U23) | Pulpì | 24 |
| 2008-11-22 | African Cup | Mombasa | 1 |
| 2009-04-05 | European Cup | Quarteira | DNF |
| 2009-05-17 | Premium European Cup | Pontevedra | 24 |
| 2009-05-23 | Duathlon European Championships (U23) | Budapest | 7 |
| 2009-06-14 | European and Pan American Cup and Iberoamerican Championships | Ferrol | 16 |
| 2009-06-20 | European Championships (U23) | Tarzo Revine | 16 |
| 2009-07-18 | European Cup | Athlone | 10 |
| 2009-07-25 | European Cup and Balkan Championships | Varna | 9 |
| 2010-01-10 | Pan American Cup | Viña del Mar | 8 |
| 2010-01-15 | Pan American Cup | La Paz | 6 |
| 2010-04-11 | European Cup | Quarteira | 29 |
| 2010-06-12 | Premium European Cup | Pontevedra | 22 |
| 2010-10-29 | Long Distance Triathlon World Series Event | Ibiza | 3 |
| 2011-04-30 | Cross Triathlon World Championships | Extremadura | 18 |

BG = the sponsor British Gas · DNF = did not finish · DNS = did not start
