= Frederik Van Lierde =

Belgian triathlete

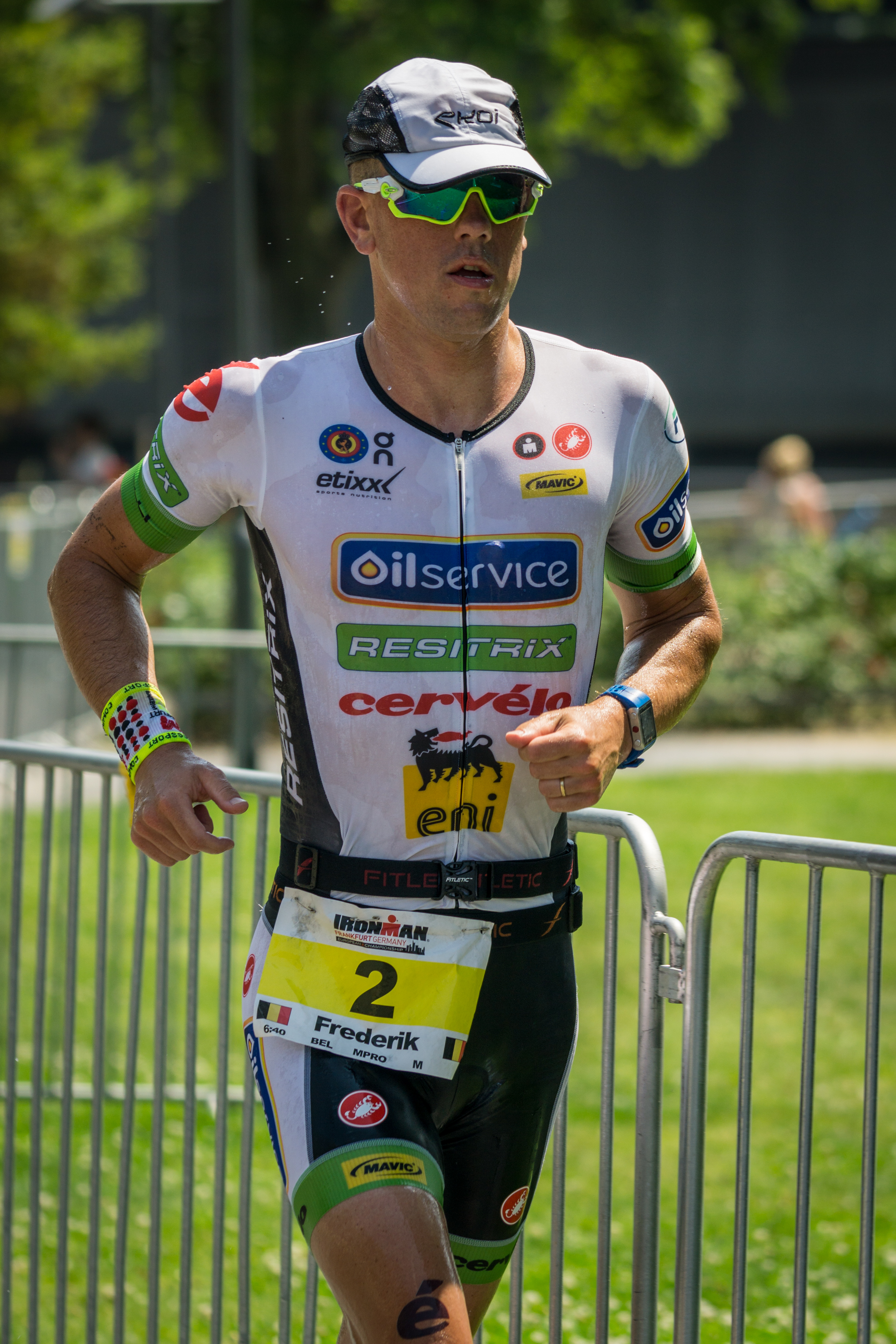
- Frederik Van Lierde at the 2015 Ironman Germany

Personal information
- Nationality: Belgian
- Born: 25 May 1979 (age 47) Menen
- Height: 1.84 m (6 ft 0 in)
- Weight: 74 kg (163 lb)
- Spouse: Sofie Vandermeersch
- Website: www.frederikvanlierde.com

Sport
- Country: Belgium
- Sport: Triathlon
- Team: Leie Triatlon Team Latem (LTTL)
- Coached by: Luc Van Lierde
Medal record
Men's triathlon
Ironman Triathlon World Championships
Gold medal – first place	2013 Kailua-Kona	Elite
Bronze medal – third place	2012 Kailua-Kona	Elite

Frederik Van Lierde (born 25 May 1979) is a Belgian professional triathlete and 2013 Ironman triathlon world champion.

Van Lierde has been coached for two years by two-time Ironman champion and former world record holder Luc Van Lierde, to whom he is not related. He came in third in the 2012 Ironman World Championship. On 13 October 2013, Van Lierde won the same championship, becoming only the second Belgian to win the Ironman, after Luc Van Lierde. He finished the race with a 51:02 swim, a 4:25:37 bike and a 2:51:18 marathon to capture the win in total of 8:12:29. It was the eighth-fastest time in the 35-year history of the event.

In March 2017, Van Lierde was attacked and robbed while training in Port Elizabeth, South Africa.

== Notable results ==
- 2007 European championship LD ITU - 1st
- 2008 Ironman New Zealand - 2nd
- 2010 Ironman France - 2nd
- 2011 Ironman 70.3 South Africa - 1st
- 2011 Abu Dhabi triathlon - 1st
- 2011 Ironman France - 1st
- 2012 Ironman Melbourne - 3rd
- 2012 Ironman France - 1st
- 2012 Ironman World Championship - 3rd
- 2013 Abu Dhabi triathlon - 1st
- 2013 Ironman France - 1st
- 2013 Ironman World Championship - 1st
- 2014 Ironman Germany - 2nd
- 2015 Ironman South Africa - 1st
- 2016 Ironman Mexico - 1st
- 2017 Ironman France - 1st
- 2018 Ironman France - 1st
- 2019 Ironman France - 3rd
