= 1989 ITU Triathlon World Championships =

International sports competition

ITU Triathlon World Championships
- Location: Avignon, France
- Date: August 6, 1989
- Competitors: 182 (elite only; 116 men, 66 women)

Champions
- Men: Mark Allen (USA)
- Women: Erin Baker (NZL)

The 1989 ITU Triathlon World Championships was a triathlon competition held in Avignon in France on August 6, 1989, and organized by the International Triathlon Union, now World Triathlon. This was the inaugural edition of the competition following the creation of the International Triathlon Union.

The Elite races for men and women consisted of a 1.5 km (0.93 mi) swim, 40 km (25 mi) bike and 10 km (6.2 mi) run, significantly shorter than the classic Ironman Triathlon event. The distance would come to be referred to as 'Standard' or 'Olympic' distance triathlon. Separate transition times were not recorded in this edition, and other in course timings are sporadic. Junior races for boys and girls were also held. A further series of age-group championships for amateur athletes was also held.

== Medal Summary ==
Event	Gold		Silver		Bronze	
Elite
Men	Mark Allen; United States	1:58:45	Glenn Cook; Great Britain	2:00:03	Rick Wells; New Zealand	2:00:56
Women	Erin Baker; New Zealand	2:10:00	Jan Ripple; United States	2:10:33	Laurie Samuelson; United States	2:12:49
Junior
Boys	Bjorn Gustafsson; West Germany	2:05:51	Enrique Quevedo Huerta; Mexico	2:07:46	Dave Pier; United States	2:09:04
Girls	Kristen McCary; United States	2:22:49	Amy Wheeler; United States	2:24:14	Cedrine Soulet; France	2:25:24

== Results ==
The following are the results of the elite races:

=== Men ===
An enormous field of 116 men took the startline for the first recognised world championship race. Mark Allen of the United States was first to cross the line, winning the inaugural title of world triathlon champion.

Rank	Athlete	Nation	Swim	Bike	Run	Overall time
1st place, gold medalist(s)	Mark Allen	United States (USA)	28:22	57:16	33:07	1:58:45
2nd place, silver medalist(s)	Glenn Cook	Great Britain (GBR)	26:45	59:46	33:32	2:00:03
3rd place, bronze medalist(s)	Rick Wells	New Zealand (NZL)	26:38	58:14	36:04	2:00:56
4	Miles Stewart	Australia (AUS)	28:26	1:00:43	32:28	2:01:37
5	Rob Barel	Netherlands (NED)	28:26	1:00:06	33:06	2:02:01
6	Brad Beven	Australia (AUS)	27:37	1:00:25	34:20	2:02:21
7	Mike Pigg	United States (USA)	28:30	57:17	36:38	2:02:26
8	Karel Blondeel	Belgium (BEL)	28:28	58:15	36:39	2:03:21
9	Spot Anderson	Australia (AUS)	26:53	1:03:54	32:42	2:03:29
10	Wolfgang Kattnig	Austria (AUT)	29:38	1:00:32	33:28	2:03:38
11	Brooks Clark	United States (USA)	28:15	1:01:21	34:17	2:03:54
12	Roy Hinnen	Switzerland (SUI)	29:17	57:49	37:13	2:04:19
13	Dan Murray	Canada (CAN)	28:40	1:01:39	34:06	2:04:26
14	Paul White	Canada (CAN)	31:07	58:58	34:23	2:04:28
15	Pim Van Den Bos	Netherlands (NED)	31:10	58:36	34:43	2:04:30
16	Alfons Hamblock	Belgium (BEL)	28:49	1:02:54	32:47	2:04:31
17	Simon Cassidy	Canada (CAN)	27:01	1:01:10	36:21	2:04:32
18	Jose Ricardo González Dávila	Mexico (MEX)	29:48	58:55	36:24	2:05:07
19	Jürgen Zäck	West Germany (FRG)	29:03	59:24	36:42	2:05:10
20	Cristian Bustos Mancilla	Chile (CHI)	30:10	1:01:14	33:58	2:05:21
21	Nicholas Croft	Australia (AUS)	26:44	1:02:38	36:13	2:05:35
22	Joachim Buck	West Germany (FRG)	28:59	1:02:32	34:04	2:05:35
23	Carlos Santamaria Medel	Spain (ESP)	31:06	1:00:31	34:10	2:05:46
24	Rick Kiddle	Great Britain (GBR)	30:54	1:00:51	34:04	2:05:49
25	Gareth Mccarthy	Ireland (IRL)	26:34	58:17	41:07	2:05:58
26	Danilo Palmucci	Italy (ITA)	31:10	54:38	40:15	2:06:03
27	Patrick Girard	France (FRA)	31:01	59:41	35:39	2:06:21
28	Mark Koks	Netherlands (NED)	29:52	1:03:28	33:05	2:06:26
29	Jochen Basting	West Germany (FRG)	28:45	1:01:44	36:01	2:06:32
30	Berni Shrosbree	Great Britain (GBR)	31:00	1:00:33	35:05	2:06:38
31	Scott LeDrew	Canada (CAN)	28:55	1:00:55	36:51	2:06:41
32	Thomas Leutenegger	Switzerland (SUI)	28:44	59:00	39:00	2:06:44
33	Francesc Godoy Mulet	Spain (ESP)	29:14	1:02:21	35:13	2:06:49
34	Michael Thorén	Sweden (SWE)	28:48	59:34	38:32	2:06:54
35	Jose Juan Ayet Gisbert	Spain (ESP)	28:44	1:00:55	37:34	2:07:13
36	Bernardo Zetina	Mexico (MEX)	29:45	1:03:36	34:01	2:07:23
37	Richard Hobson	Great Britain (GBR)	30:00	59:49	37:36	2:07:24
38	Greg Welch	Australia (AUS)	29:12	1:01:38	36:40	2:07:30
39	Lucien Loyens	Netherlands (NED)	30:56	59:56	36:39	2:07:31
40	Ken Glah	United States (USA)	28:47	1:02:09	36:36	2:07:32
41	Hermann Kramer	West Germany (FRG)	30:03	1:01:27	36:06	2:07:35
42	Gerd Amrhein	West Germany (FRG)	30:56	1:01:36	35:05	2:07:38
43	Eduardo Burguete Babi	Spain (ESP)	28:37	1:03:04	36:08	2:07:49
44	Leandro Macedo	Brazil (BRA)	28:57	1:04:49	34:13	2:07:59
45	Péter Kropkó	Hungary (HUN)	29:09	1:03:56	34:57	2:08:02
46	Jean Moureau	Belgium (BEL)	30:59	1:00:42	36:44	2:08:25
47	Paulo Armando Barcellos Saraiva	Brazil (BRA)	29:01	1:02:14	37:30	2:08:45
48	Iñaki Arenal Gonzalez	Spain (ESP)	27:59	1:03:01	37:56	2:08:56
49	Jeff Devlin	United States (USA)	30:02	1:01:36	37:42	2:09:19
50	Werner Uytterhaegen	Belgium (BEL)	29:46	1:01:29	38:15	2:09:30
51	Kris Marien	Belgium (BEL)	31:14	1:00:36	37:46	2:09:36
52	Hideya Miyazuka	Japan (JPN)	31:57	1:01:25	36:36	2:10:00
53	Norbert Domnik	Austria (AUT)	32:29	1:01:54	35:39	2:10:02
54	Michal Adamec	Czech Republic (CZE)	28:59	1:01:58	39:12	2:10:09
55	Jan Damgaard	Denmark (DEN)	32:49	1:02:01	35:23	2:10:13
56	Pierre-Alain Frossard	Switzerland (SUI)	29:54	1:01:28	38:54	2:10:16
57	Nick Ballard	Great Britain (GBR)	29:54	1:03:42	37:09	2:10:46
58	Todd Voss	Australia (AUS)	26:46	1:08:58	35:05	2:10:49
59	Marcus Ornellas	Brazil (BRA)	28:59	1:01:44	40:16	2:11:00
60	Pascal Fretigny	France (FRA)	26:48	1:05:55	38:37	2:11:20
61	Stephan Lindh	Sweden (SWE)	32:50	1:01:28	37:05	2:11:22
62	Raul Lemir	Argentina (ARG)	28:55	1:05:56	36:38	2:11:29
63	Ricardo Probert Maldonado	Mexico (MEX)	29:06	1:06:12	36:12	2:11:30
64	Attilio Boni	Italy (ITA)	33:51	1:03:24	34:28	2:11:43
65	Wolfgang Dittrich	West Germany (FRG)	28:10	1:02:08	41:47	2:12:05
66	Pablo Restrepo	Colombia (COL)	27:03	1:07:51	37:17	2:12:11
67	Pasi Salonen	Sweden (SWE)	31:02	1:00:43	40:38	2:12:24
68	Alexander Schawalder	Switzerland (SUI)	30:57	1:03:17	38:59	2:13:14
69	Eugene Galbraith	Ireland (IRL)	32:31	1:03:16	37:45	2:13:32
70	Herwig Reinisch	Austria (AUT)	32:31	1:01:16	39:52	2:13:39
71	Pablo Droguett	Chile (CHI)	33:38	1:05:22	34:40	2:13:41
72	Mike Stirling	Canada (CAN)	28:34	1:03:00	42:10	2:13:44
73	Mica Kagan	Israel (ISR)	29:47	1:09:02	34:57	2:13:46
74	Laurent Boquillet	France (FRA)	30:02	1:04:32	39:15	2:13:49
75	Roberto Deleage	Brazil (BRA)	33:24	1:03:38	36:55	2:13:57
76	Mitsuhiro Yamamoto	Japan (JPN)	33:05	1:02:45	38:24	2:14:14
77	Fabrizio Ferraresi	Italy (ITA)	31:13	1:04:52	38:18	2:14:23
78	Walter Carnovali	Italy (ITA)	33:18	1:04:35	36:52	2:14:44
79	Heinz Bede-Kraut	Austria (AUT)	29:40	1:06:11	39:26	2:15:17
80	Pavel Petr	Czech Republic (CZE)	32:52	1:03:28	39:07	2:15:28
81	Andréas Hartkopp	Denmark (DEN)	30:00	1:04:06	41:35	2:15:42
82	Erik Elgerma	Netherlands (NED)	31:28	1:06:31	38:30	2:16:28
83	Vincent Bavay	France (FRA)	32:38	1:07:08	37:02	2:16:50
84	Alex Estrada	Colombia (COL)	32:15	1:09:27	35:19	2:17:01
85	Hideo Nakagome	Japan (JPN)	29:22	1:06:37	41:09	2:17:08
86	Dave Bradding	New Zealand (NZL)	31:35	1:04:49	40:50	2:17:15
87	Mark Bates	Canada (CAN)	28:53	1:04:24	44:02	2:17:21
88	Artur Parreira	Portugal (POR)	36:44	1:05:45	34:54	2:17:25
89	Silvano Fedel	Italy (ITA)	34:19	1:06:56	36:23	2:17:38
90	Mike Gutmann	Switzerland (SUI)	32:27	1:05:18	40:21	2:18:06
91	Andrea Sacchetti	Italy (ITA)	33:39	1:07:37	37:06	2:18:22
92	Pedro Cordeiro	Portugal (POR)	31:17	1:06:00	41:21	2:18:39
93	Raymond Crâne	Hong Kong (HKG)	35:00	1:03:10	40:38	2:18:48
94	Xabier Gorrotxategi Mujika	Spain (ESP)	31:43	1:08:16	39:31	2:19:31
95	Bruce Baxter	New Zealand (NZL)	31:10	1:00:17	48:13	2:19:40
96	Oyvind Gitlesen	Norway (NOR)	33:51	1:06:26	39:30	2:19:48
97	Aleksander Jalowiecki	Poland (POL)	33:27	1:08:47	37:42	2:19:56
98	Zdenek Zmeskal	Czech Republic (CZE)	40:28	1:02:02	37:43	2:20:12
99	Greg Hopkins	Bermuda (BER)	33:20	1:03:47	43:07	2:20:15
100	Tony Ryan	Bermuda (BER)	38:21	1:04:23	37:38	2:20:23
101	Francisco Mutti	Argentina (ARG)	34:08	1:03:56	42:35	2:20:39
102	Hideki Yamane	Japan (JPN)	34:04	1:04:23	42:40	2:21:08
103	Tadeusz Trochanowski	Poland (POL)	34:24	1:06:22	40:42	2:21:28
104	Brett Marshall	New Zealand (NZL)	26:50	1:13:19	41:45	2:21:54
105	Edgardo Avila	Argentina (ARG)	32:44	1:07:11	42:11	2:22:06
106	Julio Viana	Portugal (POR)	34:02	1:06:09	42:15	2:22:27
107	Tomasz Nadolski	Poland (POL)	35:24	1:06:35	40:55	2:22:54
108	James Cooper	Bermuda (BER)	34:17	1:07:20	41:51	2:23:28
109	György Jakócs	Hungary (HUN)	33:07	1:08:17	42:28	2:23:52
110	Jiri Seidl	Czech Republic (CZE)	37:53	1:05:34	40:54	2:24:21
111	Mario Vismale	Suriname (SUR)	36:37	1:08:49	39:31	2:24:57
112	Gábor Kindl	Hungary (HUN)	34:17	1:10:56	39:45	2:24:59
113	Botond Emhő	Hungary (HUN)	31:09	1:11:56	41:55	2:25:01
114	Juan Martinez Orraca	Puerto Rico (PUR)	33:54	1:10:19	40:40	2:25:04
115	Thomas O'Donovan	Ireland (IRL)	38:44	1:08:54	38:29	2:26:07
-	Toshiyuki Nakayama	Japan (JPN)	DSQ			
Key : DNF - did not finish ; DNS - did not start

=== Women ===
66 athletes took part, with New Zealand athlete Erin Baker winning the inaugural world title.

Rank	Athlete	Nation	Swim	Bike	Run	Overall time
1st place, gold medalist(s)	Erin Baker	New Zealand (NZL)	29:31	1:03:06	37:24	2:10:00
2nd place, silver medalist(s)	Jan Ripple	United States (USA)	28:45	1:03:42	38:05	2:10:33
3rd place, bronze medalist(s)	Laurie Samuelson	United States (USA)	29:26	1:06:22	37:00	2:12:49
4	Karen Smyers	United States (USA)	30:06	1:05:31	37:34	2:13:12
5	Sylviane Puntous	Canada (CAN)	29:32	1:06:19	37:27	2:13:19
6	Patricia Puntous	Canada (CAN)	30:15	1:07:22	38:01	2:15:38
7	Carol Montgomery	Canada (CAN)	30:06	1:06:16	39:22	2:15:45
8	Simone Mortier	West Germany (FRG)	30:08	1:06:00	40:06	2:16:15
9	Kendall Morrison	Canada (CAN)	32:31	1:05:09	38:46	2:16:28
10	Louise Bonham	Australia (AUS)	33:08	1:05:34	38:04	2:16:47
11	Thea Sybesma	Netherlands (NED)	30:12	1:06:00	41:00	2:17:13
12	Sarah Coope	Great Britain (GBR)	31:28	1:07:53	38:09	2:17:31
13	Lisa Laiti	United States (USA)	29:30	1:13:54	34:54	2:18:19
14	Terri Smith-Ross	Canada (CAN)	31:10	1:07:51	39:38	2:18:39
15	Kirsten Ullrich	West Germany	37:16	1:07:37	33:58	2:18:52
16	Joy Hansen	United States (USA)	29:19	1:10:00	39:34	2:18:55
17	Anne Marie Rouchon	France (FRA)	32:01	1:09:24	37:58	2:19:23
18	Erin Christie	New Zealand (NZL)	32:58	1:05:11	41:47	2:19:57
19	Mandy Dean	West Germany	28:00	1:08:57	43:09	2:20:06
20	Sue Schlatter	Canada (CAN)	31:34	1:08:03	40:50	2:20:28
21	Sue Latshaw	United States (USA)	30:07	1:11:27	39:21	2:20:55
22	Sue Turner	Australia (AUS)	29:46	1:09:59	41:12	2:20:57
23	Catherine Jay-Gabel	France (FRA)	34:46	1:07:18	40:01	2:22:06
24	Cathy Bow	Great Britain (GBR)	32:15	1:10:54	39:40	2:22:49
25	Rebecca Werneck Stephenson	Brazil (BRA)	35:02	1:10:00	38:25	2:23:28
26	Doris Trueman	Australia (AUS)	32:06	1:11:58	39:52	2:23:56
27	Jeannine De Ruysscher	Belgium (BEL)	31:01	1:01:55	51:34	2:24:30
28	Ute Schaefer	West Germany (FRG)	36:31	1:07:52	40:11	2:24:34
29	Ana Gutierrez	U.S. Virgin Islands (ISV)	30:33	1:10:56	43:44	2:25:13
30	Natividad Torres	Puerto Rico (PUR)	32:18	1:10:47	42:21	2:25:26
31	Claudia Cortes	Chile (CHI)	30:31	1:14:49	40:20	2:25:40
32	Wilma Luggenhorst	Netherlands (NED)	31:10	1:12:18	42:34	2:26:03
33	Sue Prebble	New Zealand (NZL)	32:02	1:10:56	43:13	2:26:12
34	Birgit Rosberg-Seubert	West Germany (FRG)	30:24	1:09:25	46:29	2:26:18
35	Sophie Delemer	France (FRA)	not recorded			2:26:31
36	Catherine Dunn	New Zealand (NZL)	not recorded			2:26:35
37	Fernanda Keller	Brazil (BRA)	not recorded			2:26:46
38	Liane Bereta	Brazil (BRA)	not recorded			2:27:53
39	Anna Dokter	New Zealand (NZL)	not recorded			2:28:06
40	Elisabeth Poncelet	France (FRA)	not recorded			2:28:28
41	Carol Pickard	Australia (AUS)	not recorded			2:28:35
42	Anne Marie Kearney	Ireland (IRL)	not recorded			2:29:28
43	Anneliese Weber	West Germany (FRG)	not recorded			2:29:30
44	Doris Hollauf	Austria (AUT)	not recorded			2:30:21
45	Ann-Charlotte Thoren	Sweden (SWE)	not recorded			2:30:38
46	Andrea Zippin	Brazil (BRA)	not recorded			2:31:38
47	Charlotte Borin	Denmark (DEN)	not recorded			2:31:49
48	Ryouko Imai	Japan (JPN)	not recorded			2:32:34
49	Valerie Chretien	France (FRA)	not recorded			2:32:50
50	Zsófia Perczel	Hungary (HUN)	not recorded			2:33:02
51	Katarina Andersson	Sweden (SWE)	not recorded			2:33:28
52	Sabine Stelzmüller	Austria (AUT)	not recorded			2:34:03
53	Isabel Dumall Puertolas	Spain (ESP)	not recorded			2:35:09
54	Tomoko Takeuchi	Japan (JPN)	not recorded			2:35:11
55	Ylva Noring	Sweden (SWE)	not recorded			2:35:33
56	Dina Bilbao Barrutabeinia	Spain (ESP)	not recorded			2:36:27
57	Judit Baranyai	Hungary (HUN)	not recorded			2:38:20
58	Julia Hawley	Bermuda (BER)	not recorded			2:38:58
59	Eiko Endo	Japan (JPN)	not recorded			2:39:27
60	Suzanne Nielsen	Denmark (DEN)	not recorded			2:41:04
61	Peggy Couper	Bermuda (BER)	not recorded			2:41:15
62	Veronique Dumax	France (FRA)	not recorded			2:43:01
63	Monika Bos	Netherlands (NED)	not recorded			2:43:47
64	Lynne Devine	Bermuda (BER)	not recorded			2:45:58
65	Kiyoko Takahashi	Japan (JPN)	not recorded			2:50:04
66	Csopi Korsog	Hungary (HUN)	not recorded			3:13:25
Key : DNF - did not finish ; DNS - did not start

=== Junior summary ===
Men

(top 10 only)

Rank	Athlete	Nation	Overall time
1st place, gold medalist(s)	Bjorn Gustafsson	West Germany (FRG)	2:05:51
2nd place, silver medalist(s)	Enrique Quevedo Huerta	Mexico (MEX)	2:07:46
3rd place, bronze medalist(s)	Dave Pier	United States (USA)	2:09:04
4	Andrew Macmartin	Canada (CAN)	2:09:30
5	Cameron Widoff	United States (USA)	2:11:25
6	Renaud Frevin	France (FRA)	2:11:43
7	Patrick Charles	France (FRA)	2:11:44
8	Sebastien Fabre	France (FRA)	2:11:46
9	Jeff Keller	United States (USA)	2:12:37
10	Kevin Csabi	Canada (CAN)	2:13:06

Women

(top 10 only)

Rank	Athlete	Nation	Overall time
1st place, gold medalist(s)	Kristen McCary	United States (USA)	2:22:49
2nd place, silver medalist(s)	Amy Wheeler	United States (USA)	2:24:14
3rd place, bronze medalist(s)	Cedrine Soulet	France (FRA)	2:25:24
4	Leah Treadwenn	United States (USA)	2:33:23
5	Sophie Deleu	France (FRA)	2:38:14
6	Isabelle Rogowski	France (FRA)	2:39:56
7	Frederique Chabert	France (FRA)	2:40:09
8	Amy Hollingsworth	United States (USA)	2:40:19
9	Beatrice Boulhaut	France (FRA)	2:41:31
10	Melissa Muller	United States (USA)	2:42:08

== Age-grade and open championships ==
In addition to the elite professional senior and junior races, a series of age-group open championships were also held. The medalists in these races are listed below.

Event	Gold		Silver		Bronze	
Men
20-24 Male	Luis Gonzalez; United States	2:04:35	John Wiberg; United States	2:05:17	Sylvain Dafflon; France	2:07:41
25-29 Male	Paul Granger; Canada	2:05:33	Eben Jones; United States	2:06:05	Brooks Truskett; United States	2:06:40
30-34 Male	Mark Mclntyre; United States	2:06:16	Léo Vanhulsel; Belgium	2:08:40	Dennis Moriarty; United States	2:10:50
35-39 Male	Paul Daniels; United States	2:13:14	Robert Cuyler; United States	2:13:22	Mark Creighton; United States	2:13:53
40-44 Male	Jean Gilly; France	2:12:55	Bill Leach; United States	2:13:18	Gregory Reddan; Australia	2:16:17
45-49 Male	George Wright; United States	2:14:17	Orjan Sandler; Sweden	2:14:55	Christophe Salotti; France	2:18:10
50-54 Male	Wolfgang Arnold; Germany	2:22:00	Roger Alexander; United States	2:25:57	Michel Rauner; France	2:27:51
55-59 Male	Gérard Soveau; France	2:31:29	Sid Kastner; Canada	2:40:17	Peter Howard; Great Britain	2:40:38
60-64 Male	Vere Bellian; United States	2:44:47	John Benzoni; United States	2:45:40	Robert Eazor; United States	2:50:05
65-69 Male	Bill Schweizer; United States	3:00:12	Vic Mesco; United States	3:05:27	John Lippincott; United States	3:13:51
70-74 Male	James Ward; United States	3:26:22				
Women
20-24 Female	Missy Morlock; Canada	2:14:43	Cindy Gallenz; United States	2:21:37	Carol Ares; United States	2:25:46
25-29 Female	Linda Turner; United States	2:21:00	Karen Waeschle; United States	2:21:20	Christine Willis; United States	2:24:26
30-34 Female	Jody Schmidt; United States	2:17:42	Mary Orr; United States	2:23:31	Julie Billingsley; United States	2:24:09
35-39 Female	Karen McKeachie; United States	2:23:37	Marilyn Franzen; United States	2:24:52	Nancy Stark; United States	2:29:16
40-44 Female	Jane Snyder; United States	2:23:08	Lesley Cens McDowell; United States	2:27:29	Kennie Olsson; Sweden	2:32:21
45-49 Female	Joan Jeter; United States	2:33:29	Joni Van Der Veen; United States	2:35:56	Mary Klaus-Martin; United States	2:44:52
50-54 Female	Susan Bradley-Cox; United States	2:37:18	Martha Young; United States	2:50:17	Sue Hutchinson; United States	2:55:27
55-59 Female	Madonna Buder; United States	2:53:48	Mary Anne Woodring; United States	2:56:25	Ruth Kazez; United States	3:10:37
60-64 Female	Joanita Reed; United States	3:04:50				
