= 1990 European Triathlon Championships =

1990 edition of the European Triathlon Championships

- Venue: Linz, Austria
- Dates: 26 August 1990

Champions
- Men: (Belgium) Fons Hamblock
- Women: (Netherlands) Thea Sijbesma

The 1990 European Triathlon Championships (officially the 1990 Linz ETU Triathlon European Championships) was the 6th edition of the European Triathlon Championships, held in Linz, Austria, on 26 August 1990.

== Summary ==
Organised by the European Triathlon Union (ETU), the competition was contested over the standard Olympic triathlon distance of a 1,500 m (1,600 yd) swim, a 40 km (25 mi) cycle, and a 10 km (6.2 mi) run.

In the elite men's race, Belgium's Fons Hamblock won the gold medal in 1:50:28, finishing just 17 seconds ahead of four-time champion Rob Barel of the Netherlands, while Austria's Wolfgang Kattnig claimed the bronze medal on home soil, a second further back.

While the men's race was relatively close, in the elite women's competition, Thea Sijbesma of the Netherlands won the title in dominant fashion in a time of 2:04:00, a minute ahead of West Germany's Simone Mortier and France's Isabelle Mouthon-Michellys a further two and a half minutes back.

== Medal summary ==
Event	Gold		Silver		Bronze	
Men's individual	Fons Hamblock; Belgium	1:50:28	Rob Barel; Netherlands	1:50:45	Wolfgang Kattnig; Austria	1:50:46
Women's individual	Thea Sijbesma; Netherlands	2:04:00	Simone Mortier; West Germany	2:05:04	Isabelle Mouthon-Michellys; France	2:07:35
Men's team	Belgium; Alfons Hamblock; Didier Volckaert; Luc Van Lierde	5:34:09	France; Patrick Girard (triathlon); Serge Lecrique; Yves Lossouarn	5:35:49	Great Britain; Simon Lessing; Rick Kiddle; Glenn Cook	5:37:45
Women's team	West Germany; Simone Mortier; Ute Schäfer (Triathletin); Kirsten Ullrich	6:26:31	France; Isabelle Mouthon-Michellys; Sophie Delemer; Béatrice Mouthon	6:30:14	Netherlands; Thea Sybesma; Inge Pool; Katinka Wiltenburg	6:31:15

== Results ==
=== Elite Men ===
Pos.	Name	Nation	Swim	Bike	Run	Total
1st place, gold medalist(s)	Fons Hamblock	Belgium	—	—	32:10	01:50:28
2nd place, silver medalist(s)	Rob Barel	Netherlands	17:57	1:00:07	32:40	01:50:45
3rd place, bronze medalist(s)	Wolfgang Kattnig	Austria	18:37	59:35	32:35	01:50:46
4	Patrick Girard	France	—	—	32:51	1:50:55
5	Didier Volckaert	Belgium	—	—	33:13	1:51:36
6	Fabrizio Ferraresi	Italy	—	—	33:23	1:51:48
7	Francesc Godoy	Spain	18:24	1:00:01	33:28	1:51:52
8	Simon Lessing	Great Britain	17:36	1:01:17	33:06	1:52:02
9	Luc Van Lierde	Belgium	17:33	1:00:47	33:42	1:52:03
10	Serge Lecrique	France	—	—	33:55	1:52:16
11	Karel Blondeel	Belgium	18:42	59:33	34:09	1:52:25
12	Yves Lossouarn	France	18:52	59:25	34:19	1:52:37
13	Rick Kiddle	Great Britain	18:55	59:49	33:58	1:52:43
14	Philippe Methlon	France	—	—	34:41	1:52:54
15	Glenn Cook	Great Britain	18:36	59:45	34:39	1:52:59

=== Men's team ===
The positions and results in the team race were decided on the combined times for the three fastest finishers for each national federation.

Rank	Country	Athletes	Combined time
1st place, gold medalist(s)	Belgium	Fons Hamblock (1:50:29); Didier Volckaert (1:51:36); Luc Van Lierde (1:52:04)	5:34:09
2nd place, silver medalist(s)	France	Patrick Girard ^{(fr)} (1:50:56); Serge Lecrique (1:52:16); Yves Lossouarn (1:52:37)	5:35:49
3rd place, bronze medalist(s)	(United Kingdom) Great Britain	Simon Lessing (1:52:02); Rick Kiddle (1:52:43); Glenn Cook (1:53:00)	5:37:45
4	Netherlands	Rob Barel (1:50:46); Lucien Loyens (1:53:27); Pim van den Bos (1:54:50)	5:39:03
5	Austria	Wolfgang Kattnig (1:50:47); Adolft Hanel (1:54:28); Gerald Will (1:56:00)	5:41:15
6	West Germany	Rainer Müller-Hörner (1:53:57); Bjorn Gustafsson (1:54:22); Erick Schroeder (1:55:07)	5:43:26
7	Switzerland	Patrick Laederach (1:54:12); Roy Hinnen (1:54:14); Christoph Mauch (1:55:30)	5:43:56
8	Italy	Fabrizio Ferraresi (1:51:48); Andrea Bruno Lombardozzi (1:56:38); Pietro Giorgetti (1:56:57)	5:45:23
9	Spain	Francesc Godoy Mulet (1:51:53); Eduardo Burguete Babi (1:56:14); Xabier Gorrotxategi Mujika (1:57:43)	5:45:50
10	Czechoslovakia	Rene Milichovsky (1:53:21); Tomas Kocar (1:53:48); Pavel Petr (1:58:56)	5:46:05
11	Denmark	Jesper Grønbek (1:53:28); Ronny H. Hansen (1:57:33); Peter Sandvang (1:57:40)	5:48:51
12	Sweden	Michael Thorén (1:54:06); Pasi Salonen (1:59:31); Henrik Nöbbelin (1:59:37)	5:53:14
13	East Germany	Andreas Claus (1:53:25); Bernd Jaudzims (2:03:09); Rolf Krause (2:04:15)	6:00:49
14	Soviet Union	Alexander Dorondov (2:00:48); Sergey Nikitin (2:03:17); Kalju Ojaste (2:03:17)	6:07:22
15	Hungary	Tibor Lehmann (1:58:45); Balázs Emhő (2:02:33); Gyorgy Krajnyak (2:06:31)	6:07:49
16	Portugal	Fernando Damas (2:01:17); Artur Parreira (2:03:54); Carlos Brito (2:08:08)	6:13:19
17	Poland	Dariusz Konrad (2:00:28); Cezary Figurski (2:05:31); Zbigniew Szuba (2:13:55)	6:19:54
18	Bulgaria	Evgeni Naumov Stavrev (1:58:37); Alexander Berchev (2:12:49); Biser Bukreev (2:17:27)	6:28:53

=== Elite Women ===
Rank	Name	Country	Swim	Bike	Run	Total
1st place, gold medalist(s)	Thea Sijbesma	Netherlands	19:04	1:07:46	37:09	02:04:00
2nd place, silver medalist(s)	Simone Mortier	Germany	—	—	38:13	02:05:04
3rd place, bronze medalist(s)	Isabelle Mouthon-Michellys	France	19:02	1:09:32	39:00	02:07:35
4	Ute Schaefer	Germany	20:15	1:08:33	39:07	02:07:56
5	Sylvie Muguet	France	19:04	1:09:31	39:52	02:08:28
6	Dolorita Gerber	Switzerland	20:43	1:11:25	37:43	02:09:52
7	Barbara Delft	Belgium	20:25	1:09:00	41:16	02:10:42
8	Anne Marie Rouchon	France	20:26	1:12:48	38:23	02:11:37
9	Beatrice Mouthon	France	18:59	1:12:46	40:08	02:11:55
10	Sarah Springman	Great Britain	20:20	1:12:40	39:32	02:12:33
11	Kirsten Ullrich	Germany	—	—	42:44	02:13:30

=== Women's team ===
The team events were decided on the combined times of the first three finishers for each national federation in the individual race.

Rank	Country	Athletes	Combined time
1st place, gold medalist(s)	West Germany	Simone Mortier (2:05:04); Ute Schäfer (2:07:56); Kirsten Ullrich (2:13:31)	6:26:31
2nd place, silver medalist(s)	France	Isabelle Mouthon-Michellys (2:07:36); Sophie Delemer (2:10:42); Beatrice Mouthon (2:11:56)	6:30:14
3rd place, bronze medalist(s)	Netherlands	Thea Sybesma (2:04:01); Inge Pool (2:13:19); Katinka Wiltenburg (2:13:55)	6:31:15
4	(United Kingdom) Great Britain	Sarah Springman (2:12:34); Doris Trueman (2:13:02); Sally Ikin (2:15:45)	6:41:21
5	Switzerland	Dolorita Fuchs-Gerber (2:09:53); Jacqueline Sommer (2:14:18); Heidi Frolich (2:22:02)	6:46:13
6	Denmark	Lone Larsen (2:17:09); Jette Hartkopp (2:17:58); Charlotte Flor (2:21:57)	6:57:04
7	Austria	Sabine Stelzmüller (2:16:25); Monika Feuersinger (2:18:38); Petra Moll (2:22:42)	6:57:45
8	East Germany	Anke Otto (2:14:14); Ines Ziemer (2:26:08); Karin Wasserman (2:29:31)	7:09:53
9	Hungary	Anita Lenti (2:16:55); Beata Szabo Kovacs (2:20:40); Éva Eszesné Vas (2:33:49)	7:11:24
10	Czechoslovakia	Andrea Matulova (2:19:45); Jana Grnakova (2:23:52); Helena Matousova (2:30:02)	7:13:39

== Medal table ==
* Host nation (Austria)

Rank	Nation	Gold	Silver	Bronze	Total
1	Belgium (BEL)	2	0	0	2
2	Netherlands (NED)	1	1	1	3
3	West Germany (FRG)	1	1	0	2
4	France (FRA)	0	2	1	3
5	Austria (AUT)*	0	0	1	1
5	Great Britain (GBR)	0	0	1	1
Totals (6 entries)		4	4	4	12

== 1990 European Youth and Junior Triathlon Championships ==
=== Medalist Summary ===
A separate championships were held in Montlucon on 1 July for youth and junior athletes, the 1990 Montlucon ETU Triathlon Youth and Junior European Championships, the second of its kind. In later editions elite age-class races would become part of the main championships, but initially these were held separately as in 1990.

The medallists in the 1990 championships were as follows:

Event	Gold		Silver		Bronze	
Men junior	Thomas Leutenegger (SUI)	1:52:11	Stéphane Poulat (FRA)	1:53:27	Sébastien Fabre (FRA)	1:53:27
Women junior	Katariina Ebeling (FIN)	2:13:15	Ute Schulze (FRG)	2:15:38	Nicole Mertes (FRG)	2:15:38
Men youth	Spencer Smith (GBR)	1:58:23	Stefan Huber (FRG)	2:00:01	Normann Stadler (FRG)	2:00:42

=== Medal table ===
* Host nation (France)

Rank	Nation	Gold	Silver	Bronze	Total
1	Finland (FIN)	1	0	0	1
1	Great Britain (GBR)	1	0	0	1
1	Switzerland (SUI)	1	0	0	1
4	West Germany (FRG)	0	2	2	4
5	France (FRA)*	0	1	1	2
Totals (5 entries)		3	3	3	9

* Source:
