= Fons Hamblock =

Belgian triathlete

Personal information
- Other names: Fons Hamblok
- Nationality: Belgium
- Born: 3 December 1959 (age 66) Lommel, Belgium
- Occupations: Triathlete, swimming coach, municipal councillor
- Weight: 65 kg (143 lb)

Sport
- Sport: Triathlon
- Events: Olympic distance, middle distance
Medal record
Men's triathlon
Europe Triathlon Championships
| Gold medal – first place | 1990 Linz | Individual |
| Gold medal – first place | 1990 Linz | Team |
| Bronze medal – third place | 1986 Milton Keynes | Team |

Fons Hamblock (also spelled Fons Hamblok in Dutch; born 3 December 1959) is a Belgian former professional triathlete. He won both the individual and team gold medals at the 1990 European Triathlon Championships in Linz, Austria, becoming the first Belgian athlete to win a European triathlon title.

== Early life ==
Hamblock was born on 3 December 1959 in Lommel, Belgium, to painter Rik Hamblok and Anna Haesendonckx. He swam competitively in his youth and worked as a postman before turning to triathlon. Inspired by television coverage of the Ironman World Championship in Hawaii in 1982, he began training for triathlon and worked closely with Belgian exercise physiologist Jan Olbrecht.

== Athletic career ==
Within three years of taking up the sport, Hamblock established himself among Belgium's leading triathletes alongside rivals Didier Volckaert and Karel Blondeel. In 1986, he won his first major regional title by capturing the Benelux Middle Distance Championship in Yvoir. Later that year, he placed 11th individually and won a team bronze medal at the 1986 European Triathlon Championships in Milton Keynes (with the team competition hosted in Mansfield). In 1988, he won the Belgian National Middle Distance Championship, again on the hilly course in Yvoir. His results enabled him to become the first professional triathlete from the Belgian province of Limburg.

Known primarily as a strong open-water swimmer, lightweight climber (weighing 65 kg (143 lb)), and fast runner, Hamblock competed extensively on the French circuit, where he won three French open titles (1986, 1988, and 1990). At the inaugural 1989 ITU Triathlon World Championships in Avignon, France, he finished 14th overall.

The highlight of Hamblock's career came at the 1990 European Triathlon Championships in Linz, Austria. Entering the final 10-kilometre run in 39th place, he overtook the field—including Rob Barel, Simon Lessing, and Yves Cordier - to cross the finish line first in 1:50:29. Although race organizers initially disqualified 22 of the top 30 finishers, including Hamblock, for alleged drafting on the bicycle leg, the European Triathlon Union jury overturned the decision and confirmed Hamblock as European champion. Alongside Didier Volckaert (5th) and Luc Van Lierde (9th), he also secured the European team gold medal for Belgium. Van Lierde remained the only subsequent Belgian male triathlete to win the European Olympic-distance title (in 1996).

During his career, Hamblock also won several Belgian Superprestige races - including events in Mol, Eupen, and Landen - and earned two silver and two bronze medals at Belgian national championships.

== Later life ==
Following his retirement from elite racing, Hamblock worked as a market vendor and an independent sales representative for Duracell. He also served as a swimming coach for 15 years - four years in Leopoldsburg and eleven years as head coach in Lommel - and spent five years coaching swimmers with physical and intellectual disabilities at the GielsBos care centre in Gierle. Among the athletes he coached were Paralympic swimmer Sam de Visser and Olympic kayaker Lize Broekx.

Hamblock served for 15 years as a municipal councillor in Lommel for the New Flemish Alliance (N-VA), focusing on sports and environmental portfolios before stepping down in December 2017 upon relocating to Pelt (Lindelhoeven).

== Major achievements ==
| Year | Competition | Location | Event | Rank | Time |
|---|---|---|---|---|---|
| 1986 | Benelux Triathlon Championships | Yvoir, Belgium | Middle distance | 1st place, gold medalist(s) | — |
| 1986 | Europe Triathlon Championships | Milton Keynes, United Kingdom | Team | 3rd place, bronze medalist(s) | — |
| 1986 | Europe Triathlon Championships | Milton Keynes, United Kingdom | Individual | 11th | — |
| 1987 | Europe Triathlon Middle Distance Championships | Roth, West Germany | Middle distance | 6th | — |
| 1988 | Belgian Triathlon Championships | Yvoir, Belgium | Middle distance | 1st place, gold medalist(s) | — |
| 1989 | World Triathlon Championships | Avignon, France | Individual | 14th | — |
| 1990 | Europe Triathlon Championships | Linz, Austria | Individual | 1st place, gold medalist(s) | 01:50:29 |
| 1990 | Europe Triathlon Championships | Linz, Austria | Team | 1st place, gold medalist(s) | — |
