= 1989 European Triathlon Championships =

1989 edition of the European Triathlon Championships

- Venue: Cascais, Portugal
- Dates: 11 June 1989

Champions
- Men: Yves Cordier (FRA) (1st title)
- Women: Simone Mortier (FRG) (1st title)

The 1989 European Triathlon Championships was the 5th edition of the European Triathlon Championships, held in Cascais, Portugal, on 11 June 1989. The competition was organised by European Triathlon Union (ETU) over the standard Olympic triathlon distance of a 1,500 m (1,600 yd) swim, a 40 km (25 mi) cycle, and a 10 km (6.2 mi) run.

== Background ==
Following the establishment of the European Triathlon Union (ETU) in 1984 to standardize competition distances and rules across the continent, the inaugural European Triathlon Championships had been staged in Immenstadt, West Germany, in 1985. Subsequent editions had been hosted in Great Britain (Milton Keynes) in 1986, France (Marseille) in 1987, and Italy (Venice) in 1987. For 1989, therefore, the championship moved to the Iberian Peninsula for the first time.

The 1989 edition took place during a pivotal year for the sport's global governance and Olympic ambitions. Just weeks prior to the Cascais races, national federations convened in Avignon, France, in May 1989 to found the International Triathlon Union (ITU), with the inaugural ITU Triathlon World Championships scheduled to take place in Avignon two months after Cascais on 6 August.

Consequently, the continental championships in Portugal served as a major early-season benchmark for European athletes preparing for the first official world championship contested over the standard Olympic distance.

Entering the event, the men's field was dominated by Dutchman Rob Barel, who had achieved legendary status at the event, having won all four previous European titles between 1985 and 1988, while defending women's champion, and three time medalist, Great Britain's Sarah Springman, returned to defend the title she had won in Venice the previous year, and attempt to extend her run of podium finishes to four.

== Race summary ==
In the elite men's competition, West Germany's Wolfgang Dittrich led out of the swim, closely followed by defending four-time champion Rob Barel of the Netherlands, France's Yves Cordier, and Dutchman Henri Kiens. Cordier took decisive control during the 40-kilometre cycling leg, posting the fastest bike split of the day to build a buffer of more than 90 seconds over Barel and Jürgen Zäck entering the final transition. Although Zäck and Barel both outpaced Cordier on the 10-kilometre run, the Frenchman's cycling advantage proved insurmountable as he crossed the finish line in 2:02:08 to end Barel's four-year unbeaten streak at the championships. Barel claimed silver 46 seconds back, while Zäck surged past early swim leader Dittrich on the run to secure bronze.

The elite women's race was dominated by Simone Mortier of West Germany, who improved on her fifth-place finish from the 1988 championships in Venice to win her first continental title by a margin of over five minutes. Mortier completed the course in 2:16:59, finishing well clear of compatriot Kirsten Ullrich, who took the silver medal. Behind the West German pair, a close battle unfolded for the final podium spot between Great Britain's defending champion Sarah Springman and 1987 champion and compatriot Sarah Coope, with Springman holding off her teammate by eight seconds to win bronze, her fourth successive podium finish.

== Medal summary ==
Event	Gold		Silver		Bronze	
Men's individual	Yves Cordier; France	2:02:08	Rob Barel; Netherlands	2:02:54	Jürgen Zäck; West Germany	2:03:04
Women's individual	Simone Mortier; West Germany	2:16:59	Kirsten Ullrich; West Germany	2:22:17	Sarah Springman; Great Britain	2:22:36

=== Medal table ===
* Host nation (Portugal)

Rank	Nation	Gold	Silver	Bronze	Total
1	West Germany (FRG)	1	1	1	3
2	France (FRA)	1	0	0	1
3	Netherlands (NED)	0	1	0	1
4	Great Britain (GBR)	0	0	1	1
Totals (4 entries)		2	2	2	6

== Results ==
Full records are unavailable for either race, but European and World Triathlon record the top ten finishes in each race as follows:

=== Elite Men ===
(top ten)

Rank	Athlete	Nation	Swim	Bike	Run	Total time
1st place, gold medalist(s)	Yves Cordier	France	20:51	1:04:47	36:29	2:02:08
2nd place, silver medalist(s)	Rob Barel	Netherlands	20:49	1:06:22	35:38	2:02:54
3rd place, bronze medalist(s)	Jürgen Zäck	West Germany	21:53	1:06:18	34:52	2:03:04
4	Pim van den Bos	Netherlands	23:10	1:05:33	35:32	2:04:16
5	Wolfgang Dittrich	West Germany	20:40	1:06:49	37:07	2:04:38
6	Henri Kiens	Netherlands	20:54	1:09:16	34:31	2:04:41
7	Thomas Leutenegger	Switzerland	21:52	1:06:35	37:07	2:05:34
8	Gerd Amrhein	West Germany	22:55	1:07:57	34:58	2:05:50
9	Jochen Basting	West Germany	21:54	1:08:34	35:36	2:06:01
10	Didier Volckaert	Belgium	21:50	1:07:52	35:56	2:06:13

=== Elite Women ===
(top ten)

Rank	Athlete	Nation	Swim	Bike	Run	Total time
1st place, gold medalist(s)	Simone Mortier	West Germany	23:20	1:14:43	38:55	2:16:59
2nd place, silver medalist(s)	Kirsten Ullrich	West Germany	23:00	1:17:38	41:37	2:22:17
3rd place, bronze medalist(s)	Sarah Springman	Great Britain	24:42	1:17:45	40:08	2:22:36
4	Sarah Coope	Great Britain	25:46	1:17:23	39:36	2:22:44
5	Catherine Jay-Gabel	France	27:09	1:16:07	39:37	2:22:54
6	Thea Sybesma	Netherlands	24:39	1:18:06	41:06	2:23:51
7	Birgit Rosberg-Seubert	West Germany	23:24	1:19:47	41:18	2:24:29
8	Doris Trueman	Great Britain	25:25	1:19:53	40:03	2:25:23
9	Ute Schäfer	West Germany	28:30	1:17:08	40:30	2:26:07
10	Irma Zwartkruis	Netherlands	27:00	1:18:39	41:06	2:26:46

== 1989 European Youth and Junior Triathlon Championships ==
A separate championships were held in Geneva on 9th September for youth and junior athletes, the first of its kind. In later editions elite age-class races would become part of the main championships, but initially were held separately.

The medallists in the 1989 championships were as follows:

=== Medal Summary ===
Event	Gold		Silver		Bronze	
Men's junior	Thomas Leutenegger; Switzerland (SUI)	1:50:50	Björn Gustafsson; West Germany (FRG)	1:53:17	Frank Heldoorn; Netherlands (NED)	1:54:49
Women's junior	Nicole Mertes; West Germany (FRG)	2:12:27	Nuemi Todt; West Germany (FRG)	2:13:52	Carina Zimmermann; West Germany (FRG)	2:15:18
Men's youth	Peter Alder; Switzerland (SUI)	1:58:50	Gerald Friedrich; West Germany (FRG)	2:00:05	Lutz Krajenski; West Germany (FRG)	2:01:15
Women's youth	Isabelle Rogowski; France (FRA)	2:15:01	Mirijam Barthels; West Germany (FRG)	2:19:46	Ellen Huber; West Germany (FRG)	2:21:07

=== Medal table ===
Medal table for the youth and junior championships:

* Host nation (Switzerland)

Rank	Nation	Gold	Silver	Bronze	Total
1	Switzerland (SUI)*	2	0	0	2
2	West Germany (FRG)	1	4	3	8
3	France (FRA)	1	0	0	1
4	Netherlands (NED)	0	0	1	1
Totals (4 entries)		4	4	4	12
