= Ironman Australia =

The Ironman Australia is a yearly triathlon in May covering the Ironman distance (3.8 km swimming, 180 km cycling and 42.195 km running) on the East Coast of Australia.

The event has been held in Port Macquarie, NSW since 2006 and prior to that it was held in Forster / Tuncurry area.

== Organization ==
The race is organised by Ironman Oceania and is sanctioned by Triathlon Australia.

The current Race Director is Kieran Burgess.

== Route ==
The transition area is located in Westport Park. The swim course includes a single lap at the mouth of the Hastings River including two crossings of the flood control weir via stairs erected for the event at the northern end of the course. The bike course consists of two laps from transition, south on Pacific & Ocean Drives to Camden Haven and then returning to the Central Business District of Port Macquarie for the turn-around between laps. The run course consists of four laps first heading east out of transition to pass along the iconic rock wall before heading north to Settlement Point and finishing in the historic Town Green Precinct of Port Macquarie.

== Winners list ==
=== Ironman Australia in Port Macquarie ===
Men

Date/Year	First place	Second place	Third place
May 5, 2019	(Australia) Cameron Wurf	(Australia) Tim Reed	(France) Denis Chevrot
May 6, 2018	(Belgium) Marino Vanhoenacker	(Australia) Luke McKenzie	(Australia) Mark Bowstead
May 7, 2017	(Australia) David Dellow	(Australia) Timothy Reed	(Australia) Clayton Fettell
May 1, 2016	(Australia) Timothy Reed	(Australia) David Dellow	(Australia) Clayton Fettell
May 3, 2015	(Australia) Paul Ambrose (2)	(Australia) Luke Bell	(Australia) Brian Fuller
May 4, 2014	(Canada) Elliot Holtham	(Australia) Paul Ambrose	(Seychelles) Nick Baldwin
May 5, 2013	(Australia) Luke Bell	(United States) Patrick Evoe	(Australia) Luke Whitmore
May 6, 2012	(Australia) Paul Ambrose	(Australia) Tim Van Berkel	(Australia) Jason Shortis
May 1, 2011	(Australia) Pete Jacobs	(France) Patrick Vernay	(Australia) Jason Shortis
March 28, 2010	(France) Patrick Vernay (4)	(United Kingdom) Scott Neyedli	(Australia) Trent Chapman
April 5, 2009	(France) Patrick Vernay (3)	(Australia) Pete Jacobs	(Australia) Tim Van Berkel
April 6, 2008	(France) Patrick Vernay (2)	(Australia) Mitchell Anderson	(Switzerland) Mathias Hecht
April 1, 2007	(France) Patrick Vernay	(Australia) Jason Shortis	(Australia) Craig Alexander
April 2, 2006	(Australia) Chris McCormack (5)	(France) Patrick Vernay	(Australia) Jason Shortis

Women

Year	First place	Second place	Third place
2019	(United Kingdom) Laura Siddall (3)	(Switzerland) Caroline Steffen	(United States) Kelsey Withrow
2018	(United Kingdom) Laura Siddall (2)	(New Zealand) Melanie Burke	(United States) Kelsey Withrow
2017	(United Kingdom) Laura Siddall	(Australia) Michelle Gailey	(Australia) Jessica Mitchell
2016	(United States) Beth Gerdes	(New Zealand) Michelle Bremer	(Australia) Dimity-Lee Duke
2015	(New Zealand) Michelle Bremer	(Australia) Jessica Fleming	(Australia) Michelle Gailey
2014	(Australia) Melissa Hauschildt	(Australia) Lisa Marangon	(New Zealand) Melanie Burke
2013	(Australia) Rebecca Hoschke	(Australia) Ange Castle	(Australia) Jessica Fleming
2012	(Australia) Michelle Mitchell	(Australia) Nicole Ward	(United States) Hillary Biscay
2011	(Switzerland) Caroline Steffen	(Australia) Amelia Pearson	(Australia) Kirsten Molloy
2010	(Australia) Carrie Lester	(Australia) Rebekah Keat	(Australia) Amelia Pearson
2009	(United Kingdom) Chrissie Wellington (2)	(Australia) Rebekah Keat	(Switzerland) Caroline Steffen
2008	(United Kingdom) Chrissie Wellington	(Australia) Kate Major	(Australia) Melinda Cockshutt
2007	(Australia) Rebekah Keat	(Australia) Belinda Granger	(Australia) Melissa Ashton
2006	(Canada) Lisa Bentley (5)	(Australia) Belinda Granger	(Australia) Melissa Ashton

=== Ironman Australia in Forster/Tuncurry ===
Men

Date/Year	First place	Second place	Third place
April 3, 2005	(Australia) Chris McCormack (4)	(Australia) Luke Bell	(Australia) Mitchell Anderson
April 4, 2004	(Australia) Chris McCormack (3)	(Australia) Chris Legh	(Australia) Jason Shortis
April 6, 2003	(Australia) Chris McCormack (2)	(Australia) Jason Shortis	(Australia) Luke Bell
April 7, 2002	(Australia) Chris McCormack	(Switzerland) Olivier Bernhard	(Australia) Jason Shortis
April 8, 2001	(Germany) Normann Stadler (2)	(Australia) Jason Shortis	(Canada) Garrett MacFadyen
April 9, 2000	(Germany) Normann Stadler	(Australia) Grant Webster	(Australia) Matthew Stephens
May 2, 1999	(Canada) Peter Reid (3)	(Australia) Chris Legh	(Germany) Jürgen Hauber
April 5, 1998	(Canada) Peter Reid (2)	(Australia) Chris Legh	(Australia) Jason Shortis
April 13, 1997	(Canada) Peter Reid	(Germany) Thomas Hellriegel	(Australia) Chris Legh
April 7, 1996	(Germany) Jürgen Zäck	(Germany) Holger Lorenz	(Australia) Bruce Thomas
April 9, 1995	(Germany) Holger Lorenz	(Hungary) Péter Kropkó	(Finland) Pauli Kiuru
April 17, 1994	(Finland) Pauli Kiuru (4)	(Australia) Bruce Thomas	(Hungary) Péter Kropkó
1993	(Finland) Pauli Kiuru (3)	(Australia) Bruce Thomas	(Netherlands) Jos Everts
1992	(Finland) Pauli Kiuru (2)	(United States) Ray Browning	(Australia) Tim Ahern
1991	(Finland) Pauli Kiuru	(Germany) Dirk Aschmoneit	(United States) Ken Glah
1990	(Australia) Rod Cedaro	(Australia) David Collins	(Australia) Chris Southwell
1989	(Australia) Tony Sattler	(Australia) Gerard Donnelly	(Australia) Steve Cunningham
1988	(Australia) Gerard Donnelly	(Australia) Rod Cedaro	(Australia) Tony Sattler

Women

Year	First place	Second place	Third place
2005	(Canada) Lisa Bentley (4)	(Australia) Melissa Ashton	(Australia) Belinda Granger
2004	(Canada) Lisa Bentley (3)	(Australia) Belinda Granger	(Australia) Kate Major
2003	(Canada) Lisa Bentley (2)	(Australia) Belinda Granger	(Japan) Yoko Hori
2002	(Canada) Lisa Bentley	(United States) Heather Fuhr	(Australia) Belinda Granger
2001	(Canada) Lori Bowden (3)	(Australia) Belinda Granger	(Japan) Yoko Okuda
2000	(Canada) Lori Bowden (2)	(United States) Sian Welch	(Brazil) Fernanda Keller
1999	(Canada) Lori Bowden	(Australia) Joanne King	(United States) Wendy Ingraham
1998	(United States) Sian Welch	(Australia) Joanne King	(Canada) Lori Bowden
1997	(Zimbabwe) Paula Newby-Fraser (2)	(United States) Wendy Ingraham	(Canada) Lori Bowden
1996	(Zimbabwe) Paula Newby-Fraser	(United States) Wendy Ingraham	(Canada) Lynne McAllister
1995	(United States) Wendy Ingraham	(United States) Paula Johnson	(Austria) Christina Hauser
1994	(New Zealand) Sharlene Ryan	(Canada) Lynne McAllister	(United States) Paula Johnson
1993	(Netherlands) Thea Sybesma	(Canada) Lynne McAllister	(Australia) Bianca Van Woesik
1992	(Australia) Louise Bonham (4)	(United States) Terry Schneider	(New Zealand) Erin Christie
1991	(Australia) Jan Wanklyn	(Australia) Louise Bonham	(United States) Tina Bischoff
1990	(Australia) Sally Belyea	(Australia) Jenny Bonnett	(Australia) Melinda Mentha
1989	(Australia) Louise Bonham (3)	(Denmark) Kim Isherwood	(Australia) Virginia Bell
1988	(Australia) Louise Bonham (2)	(Australia) Janine Donaldson	(Australia) Jenny Bonnett

=== Tooheys Great Lakes International Triathlon in Forster/Tuncurry ===
Männer

Date/Year	First place	Second place	Third place
March 28, 1987	(Australia) Chris Bateley	(Australia) Bob Telfer	(Australia) Greg Welch
April 20, 1985	(United States) Grant Boswell	(Australia) Marc Dragan	(Australia) Stephen Foster

Women

Year	First place	Second place	Third place
1987	(Australia) Louise McKinlay	(Australia) Jan Wanklyn	T. Griffin
1985	(New Zealand) Erin Baker	(Canada) Patricia Puntous	(Canada) Sylviane Puntous
