= Jürgen Zäck =

German triathlete (born 1965)

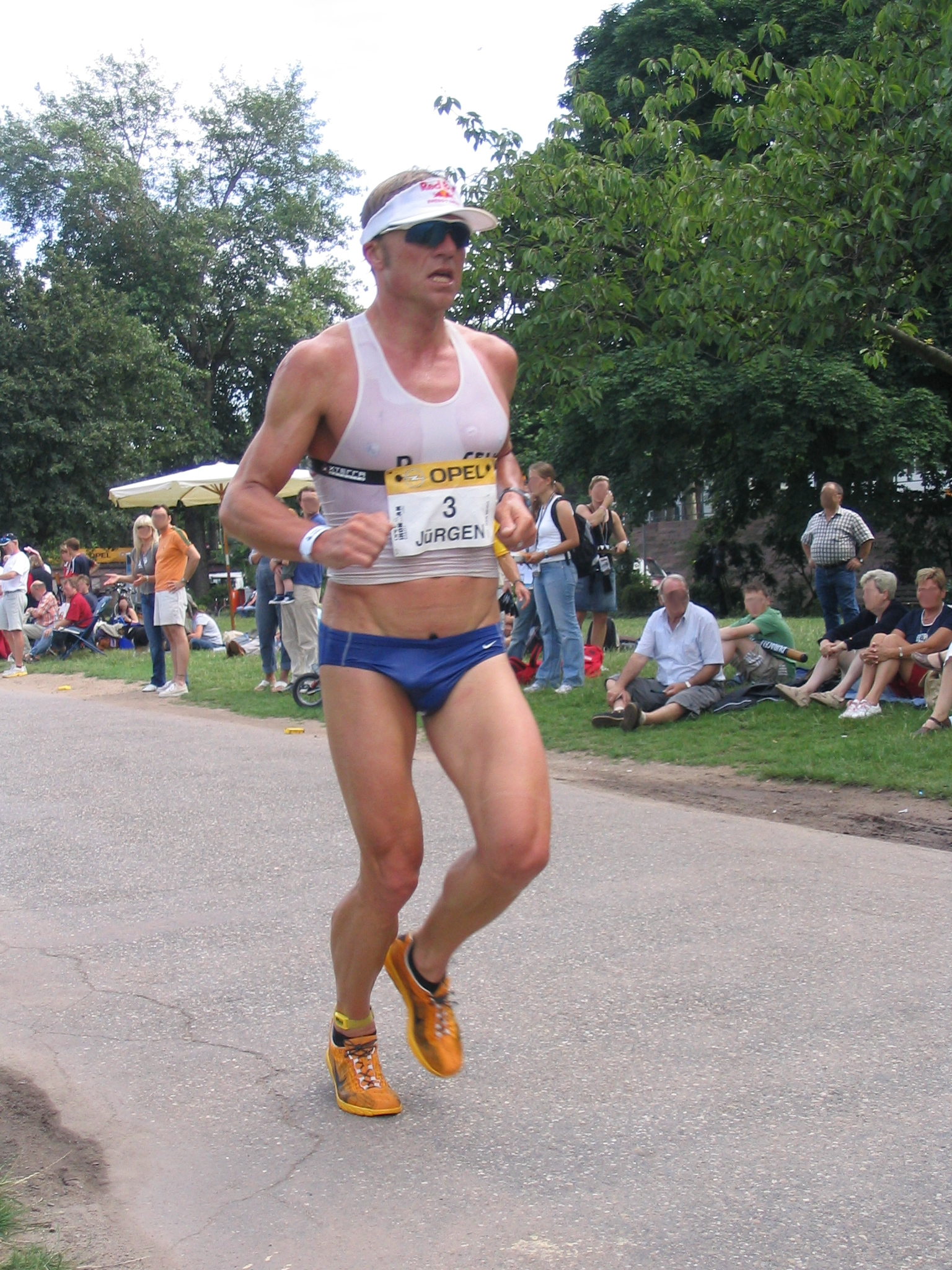
- Zäck competing at Ironman Germany in Frankfurt in 2005

Personal information
- Nickname: Zäck Attack
- Nationality: German
- Born: 8 August 1965 (age 61) Koblenz, West Germany

Sport
- Sport: Triathlon
- Retired: 2006
Medal record
Men's triathlon
Representing West Germany
European Triathlon Championships
Bronze medal – third place	1989 Cascais	Individual
Representing Germany
European Long Distance Championships
Bronze medal – third place	1991 Almere	Individual

Jürgen Zäck (born 8 August 1965) is a German former professional triathlete and triathlon coach.

== Overview ==
Widely regarded as one of the dominant long-distance cyclists in triathlon during the 1990s (earning the nickname "Zäck Attack") he won eight Ironman-distance titles during his career, including five victories at Challenge Roth/Ironman Europe in Roth, two at Ironman Austria, and one at Ironman Australia.

His 1997 winning time of 7:51:42 in Roth stood as the Ironman-distance world best for 14 years until 2011.

He also finished runner-up at the 1997 Ironman World Championship in Kailua-Kona, won the Powerman Zofingen long-distance duathlon in 1992, and claimed bronze at the 1989 European Triathlon Championships.

Following a positive out-of-competition doping test in May 2006 and a subsequent two-year suspension by the German Triathlon Union (DTU), Zäck retired from elite competition at age 40. He later relocated to Phuket, Thailand, where he has worked as a senior triathlon coach and training camp director.

== Athletic career ==
=== Early career and short-course medals (1983–1992) ===
Born in Koblenz, Zäck competed in track and field athletics before taking up triathlon in 1983. In 1984, at age 19, he finished second at the Cologne Triathlon over the long distance behind Dirk Aschmoneit. Along with Aschmoneit and Wolfgang Dittrich, Zäck formed part of the first generation of West German triathletes to achieve international prominence.

Zäck won his first German national title over the sprint distance in 1988, followed by three German Middle Distance National Championships between 1989 and 1992. At the 1989 European Triathlon Championships in Cascais, Portugal, he posted the fastest 10 km run split of the field to claim the bronze medal in 2:03:04 behind France's Yves Cordier and four-time defending champion Rob Barel.

Later in 1989, he placed 19th at the inaugural ITU Triathlon World Championships in Avignon and made his debut at the Ironman World Championship in Hawaii, finishing seventh overall, the top German finisher.

In 1991, Zäck won the bronze medal at the ETU Long Distance Triathlon European Championships in Almere. The following year, he won the prestigious Powerman Zofingen long-distance duathlon in Switzerland. He later placed third at the same event in 1994.

=== Ironman dominance and Roth world best (1992–2005) ===
At the 1992 Ironman World Championship in Kailua-Kona, Zäck set a new cycling course record to enter the marathon transition in first place before finishing fifth overall in 8:25:04. He lowered the Kona bike course record again in 1993 to 4:27:42.

Zäck achieved his greatest success at Challenge Roth/Ironman Europe in Roth, Germany, which he won five times between 1994 and 1999. After finishing third in 1991 and second in 1993, he claimed back-to-back victories in 1994 and 1995 . On 13 July 1997, Zäck won his third Roth title in 7:51:42—including a 4:14:16 cycling split—breaking Luc Van Lierde's Ironman-distance world best. His mark stood as the fastest Ironman-distance time in history for 14 years until Andreas Raelert recorded 7:41:33 at the same venue in July 2011.

Three months after his record race in Roth, Zäck achieved his best finish at the 1997 Ironman World Championship in Hawaii, placing second overall in 8:39:18 behind Thomas Hellriegel as German athletes swept the men's podium.

He added further wins at Ironman Europe in 1998 and 1999, as well as victories at Ironman Australia in 1996 and back-to-back titles at Ironman Austria in Klagenfurt in 2000 and 2001. In his final seasons as a professional, he placed second (2002) and third (2003) at Ironman Germany in Frankfurt and finished sixth at the 2003 Ironman World Championship.

== Doping suspension and retirement ==
In May 2006, Zäck tested positive for the anabolic steroid etiocholanolone during an out-of-competition doping control. Declining to request analysis of his B-sample due to what he described as the high cost and length of legal proceedings, Zäck announced his immediate retirement from competitive sport in July 2006 at age 40, while maintaining that the positive result was caused by contaminated nutritional supplements. On 13 September 2006, the German Triathlon Union (DTU) formally handed him a two-year suspension.

== Coaching and later life ==
Following his retirement from professional racing, Zäck moved permanently to Phuket, Thailand, in 2010. He initially worked as head race marshal for the Laguna Phuket Triathlon and served as director of the Triathlon Academy at the Thanyapura Sports & Leisure Club alongside Chris McCormack, before establishing his own coaching and cycling camp business, Z-Coaching Phuket. In Phuket, he has worked with elite international triathletes including Olympic and Ironman world champions Kristian Blummenfelt and Gustav Iden.

Zäck also returned to triathlon as an age-group competitor in his late forties, finishing 71st overall at Challenge Roth in 2013 (9:18:41) and placing third in the men's 50–54 age group at the 2015 Ironman World Championship in Kailua-Kona (9:53:10) after qualifying via Ironman Malaysia.

== Major results ==
Year	Competition	Venue	Position	Time	Ref.
1984	Cologne Triathlon	Cologne, West Germany	2nd place, silver medalist(s)	5:33:03	
1988	German Sprint Championships	West Germany	1st place, gold medalist(s)	—	
1989	European Championships	Cascais, Portugal	3rd place, bronze medalist(s)	2:03:04	
1989	Ironman World Championship	Kailua-Kona, United States	7th	8:38:33	
1990	Ironman World Championship	Kailua-Kona, United States	8th	8:50:17	
1991	Challenge Roth/Ironman Europe	Roth, Germany	3rd place, bronze medalist(s)	8:15:34	
1991	European Long Distance Championships	Almere, Netherlands	3rd place, bronze medalist(s)	8:33:17	
1992	German Middle Distance Championships	Germany	1st place, gold medalist(s)	—	
1992	Powerman Zofingen	Zofingen, Switzerland	1st place, gold medalist(s)	6:22:44	
1992	Ironman World Championship	Kailua-Kona, United States	5th	8:25:04	
1993	Challenge Roth/Ironman Europe	Roth, Germany	2nd place, silver medalist(s)	8:07:55	
1994	Challenge Roth/Ironman Europe	Roth, Germany	1st place, gold medalist(s)	8:01:59	
1994	Powerman Zofingen	Zofingen, Switzerland	3rd place, bronze medalist(s)	6:32:31	
1995	Challenge Roth/Ironman Europe	Roth, Germany	1st place, gold medalist(s)	8:08:07	
1996	Ironman Australia	Forster, Australia	1st place, gold medalist(s)	8:20:25	
1997	Challenge Roth/Ironman Europe	Roth, Germany	1st place, gold medalist(s)	7:51:42	
1997	Ironman World Championship	Kailua-Kona, United States	2nd place, silver medalist(s)	8:39:18	
1998	Challenge Roth/Ironman Europe	Roth, Germany	1st place, gold medalist(s)	8:03:59	
1999	Challenge Roth/Ironman Europe	Roth, Germany	1st place, gold medalist(s)	7:56:00	
2000	Ironman Austria	Klagenfurt, Austria	1st place, gold medalist(s)	8:07:16	
2001	Ironman Austria	Klagenfurt, Austria	1st place, gold medalist(s)	8:06:58	
2002	Ironman Germany	Frankfurt, Germany	2nd place, silver medalist(s)	8:30:07	
2003	Ironman Germany	Frankfurt, Germany	3rd place, bronze medalist(s)	8:20:12	
2003	Ironman World Championship	Kailua-Kona, United States	6th	8:35:19	
