= 1995 ITU Long Distance Triathlon World Championships =

International sports competition

1995 ITU Long Distance Triathlon World Championships at the
- Location: Nice, France
- Date: October 1 1995
- Competitors: Men, 95; Women, 30

Champions
- Men: Simon Lessing (GBR)
- Women: Jenny Rose (NZL)

The 1995 ITU Long Distance Triathlon World Championships was a triathlon competition held in Nice in France on October 1 1995 and organized by the International Triathlon Union, now World Triathlon. This was the second edition of this championship. The Elite races for men and women consisted of a 4 km (2.5 mi) swim, 120 km (75 mi) bike and 32 km (20 mi) run, longer than the standard 1.5 km swim, 40 km bike and 10 km run associated with the World Triathlon Championship Series and the Olympic Games, but shorter than the classic Ironman Triathlon event.

The championship included a series of age-group championship races.

== Medal Summary ==
| Event | Gold | | Silver | | Bronze | |
|---|---|---|---|---|---|---|
| Men | Simon Lessing; Great Britain | 5:46:17 | Luc Van Lierde; Belgium | 5:48:24 | Peter Reid; Canada | 5:51:18 |
| Women | Jenny Rose; New Zealand | 6:28:08 | Ute Schaefer ^{(de)} Germany | 6:39:58 | Ines Estedt ^{(de)} Germany | 6:41:43 |

== Results ==
The following are the results of the elite races:

=== Men ===
Ninety-five athletes contested the men's elite race on 1 October 1995.

| Rank | Athlete | Swim | T1 | Bike | T2 | Run | Overall time |
|---|---|---|---|---|---|---|---|
| 1st place, gold medalist(s) | Simon Lessing (GBR) | 48:18 | 1:59 | 3:12:21 | 1:56 | 1:41:43 | 5:46:17 |
| 2nd place, silver medalist(s) | Luc Van Lierde (BEL) | 49:23 | 1:58 | 3:11:02 | 1:59 | 1:44:02 | 5:48:24 |
| 3rd place, bronze medalist(s) | Peter Reid (CAN) | 49:56 | 1:56 | 3:10:29 | 2:05 | 1:46:52 | 5:51:18 |
| 4 | Philippe Methion (FRA) | 49:21 | 1:43 | 3:08:04 | 1:43 | 1:52:12 | 5:53:03 |
| 5 | Christoph Mauch (SUI) | 51:48 | 2:02 | 3:12:54 | 1:29 | 1:45:08 | 5:53:21 |
| 6 | Eric Lacaze (FRA) | 49:26 | 1:40 | 3:11:57 | 1:24 | 1:49:04 | 5:53:31 |
| 7 | Yves Cordier (FRA) | 48:17 | 1:56 | 3:12:26 | 1:37 | 1:49:47 | 5:54:03 |
| 8 | Olivier Bernhard (SUI) | 52:42 | 2:07 | 3:13:46 | 1:59 | 1:44:15 | 5:54:49 |
| 9 | Eimert Venderbosch (NED) | 52:34 | 2:06 | 3:12:06 | 1:49 | 1:48:31 | 5:57:06 |
| 10 | Olaf Rennicke (GER) | 49:46 | 1:49 | 3:10:53 | 2:04 | 1:54:13 | 5:58:45 |
| 11 | Jan Van Der Marel (NED) | 54:35 | 2:00 | 3:15:42 | 2:14 | 1:45:01 | 5:59:32 |
| 12 | Didier Volckaert (BEL) | 49:50 | 2:11 | 3:10:40 | 1:52 | 1:55:10 | 5:59:43 |
| 13 | Philippe Lie (FRA) | 54:31 | 2:20 | 3:12:38 | 1:59 | 1:48:26 | 5:59:54 |
| 14 | Vasilis Krommidas (GRE) | 49:44 | 2:01 | 3:15:03 | 2:11 | 1:51:48 | 6:00:47 |
| 15 | Didier Lafargue (FRA) | 52:44 | 1:51 | 3:15:13 | 1:58 | 1:49:45 | 6:01:31 |
| 16 | Dirk Van Gossum (BEL) | 52:24 | 2:14 | 3:13:59 | 1:56 | 1:52:10 | 6:02:43 |
| 17 | Danny Simons (BEL) | 49:41 | 2:11 | 3:17:49 | 2:03 | 1:51:27 | 6:03:11 |
| 18 | Danilo Palmucci (ITA) | 52:39 | 2:07 | 3:15:15 | 2:17 | 1:50:59 | 6:03:17 |
| 19 | Machiel Ittmann (NED) | 52:45 | 2:11 | 3:14:47 | 2:11 | 1:51:40 | 6:03:34 |
| 20 | Stefan Hachul (GER) | 49:57 | 1:57 | 3:18:14 | 2:12 | 1:53:12 | 6:05:32 |
| 21 | Peter Celba (GER) | 49:47 | 2:14 | 3:23:32 | 2:01 | 1:48:01 | 6:05:35 |
| 22 | Stefan Holzner (GER) | 52:36 | 2:07 | 3:20:48 | 2:02 | 1:48:05 | 6:05:38 |
| 23 | Robert Watson Craig (NZL) | 49:33 | 2:04 | 3:17:02 | 2:04 | 1:54:59 | 6:05:42 |
| 24 | Pierre Houseaux (FRA) | 49:53 | 2:02 | 3:10:45 | 1:34 | 2:02:17 | 6:06:31 |
| 25 | Pierre-Alain Frossard (SUI) | 52:43 | 2:26 | 3:16:29 | 2:31 | 1:53:21 | 6:07:30 |
| 26 | Kris Marien (BEL) | 52:25 | 2:21 | 3:11:35 | 2:28 | 1:58:55 | 6:07:44 |
| 27 | Peter Alder (SUI) | 49:39 | 1:51 | 3:13:13 | 1:49 | 2:01:44 | 6:08:16 |
| 28 | Arild Tveiten (NOR) | 49:42 | 1:45 | 3:18:07 | 1:42 | 1:57:05 | 6:08:21 |
| 29 | Maxime Hamon (FRA) | 49:45 | 2:08 | 3:21:48 | 2:15 | 1:52:41 | 6:08:37 |
| 30 | Rolf Lautenbacher (GER) | 54:36 | 2:31 | 3:16:30 | 2:17 | 1:52:55 | 6:08:49 |
| 31 | Serge Riviere (FRA) | 54:55 | 2:07 | 3:12:26 | 2:04 | 1:57:53 | 6:09:25 |
| 32 | Martin Breedijk (NED) | 56:30 | 2:27 | 3:18:55 | 2:09 | 1:51:53 | 6:11:54 |
| 33 | Jimmy Riccitello (USA) | 51:51 | 2:14 | 3:15:41 | 1:53 | 2:01:26 | 6:13:05 |
| 34 | Christophe Bastie (FRA) | 56:05 | 2:13 | 3:17:53 | 2:04 | 1:55:13 | 6:13:28 |
| 35 | Teemu Vesala (FIN) | 56:27 | 2:10 | 3:22:03 | 2:01 | 1:52:55 | 6:15:36 |
| 36 | Alan-John Ingarfield (GBR) | 56:06 | 2:25 | 3:27:11 | 2:17 | 1:48:28 | 6:16:27 |
| 37 | Ingo Frantzki (GER) | 52:41 | 2:03 | 3:26:43 | 1:53 | 1:54:41 | 6:18:01 |
| 38 | Guido Savelkoul (NED) | 54:25 | 1:56 | 3:19:49 | 2:21 | 2:00:35 | 6:19:06 |
| 39 | Christophe Buquet (FRA) | 58:49 | 2:35 | 3:25:57 | 2:11 | 1:53:09 | 6:22:41 |
| 40 | Jean Claude Cauchois (FRA) | 57:37 | 2:04 | 3:24:30 | 2:02 | 1:56:37 | 6:22:50 |
| 41 | Marino Rocca (ITA) | 54:32 | 2:42 | 3:25:25 | 2:12 | 1:58:09 | 6:23:00 |
| 42 | Johan Callebaut (BEL) | 52:29 | 2:40 | 3:25:32 | 2:17 | 2:00:19 | 6:23:17 |
| 43 | Sylvain Dafflon (FRA) | 51:40 | 2:09 | 3:21:24 | 2:08 | 2:05:58 | 6:23:19 |
| 44 | Glen Gore (RSA) | 49:34 | 2:08 | 3:34:08 | 1:59 | 1:55:43 | 6:23:32 |
| 45 | Rolf Kristian Roll (NOR) | 54:07 | 2:02 | 3:24:36 | 1:52 | 2:01:27 | 6:24:04 |
| 46 | Heinz Bamert (SUI) | 52:30 | 2:17 | 3:25:56 | 2:10 | 2:01:30 | 6:24:23 |
| 47 | Marc Becker (CAN) | 55:05 | 2:07 | 3:19:23 | 2:07 | 2:05:50 | 6:24:32 |
| 48 | Richard Van Diesen (NED) | 54:34 | 2:23 | 3:30:31 | 2:17 | 1:55:01 | 6:24:46 |
| 49 | Tero Hyppoelae (FIN) | 53:53 | 2:31 | 3:30:52 | 2:12 | 1:56:12 | 6:25:40 |
| 50 | Lars Mattsson (SWE) | 52:35 | 2:10 | 3:21:08 | 2:18 | 2:07:53 | 6:26:04 |
| 51 | Juha Barck (FIN) | 49:54 | 2:39 | 3:23:12 | 3:08 | 2:08:06 | 6:26:59 |
| 52 | Conrad Stoltz (RSA) | 49:43 | 1:48 | 3:24:55 | 2:06 | 2:08:53 | 6:27:25 |
| 53 | Marco Damiani (ITA) | 57:03 | 2:13 | 3:26:59 | 2:04 | 2:00:53 | 6:29:12 |
| 54 | Guido Minnebo (BEL) | 54:45 | 2:17 | 3:23:35 | 2:20 | 2:06:24 | 6:29:21 |
| 55 | Ross Muir (GBR) | 52:47 | 2:24 | 3:32:03 | 2:28 | 2:00:02 | 6:29:44 |
| 56 | Tamas Petr (CZE) | 49:49 | 2:17 | 3:34:19 | 2:26 | 2:01:37 | 6:30:28 |
| 57 | Kari Gerkman (FIN) | 54:33 | 2:12 | 3:35:41 | 2:20 | 1:56:18 | 6:31:04 |
| 58 | Bogumil Gluszkowski (POL) | 52:46 | 2:04 | 3:31:02 | 2:11 | 2:03:57 | 6:32:00 |
| 59 | Edmund Kroger (AUT) | 1:01:25 | 2:36 | 3:23:14 | 1:49 | 2:03:04 | 6:32:08 |
| 60 | Magnus Almen (SWE) | 54:17 | 2:16 | 3:37:20 | 2:14 | 1:56:15 | 6:32:22 |
| 61 | Juha Findula (FIN) | 55:33 | 2:31 | 3:27:19 | 3:03 | 2:04:51 | 6:33:17 |
| 62 | Anssi Lehtinen (FIN) | 1:03:14 | 2:48 | 3:26:49 | 2:25 | 1:58:35 | 6:33:51 |
| 63 | Christophe Delpierre (BEL) | 59:40 | 2:38 | 3:28:26 | 2:20 | 2:02:26 | 6:35:30 |
| 64 | Josef Neuhauser (AUT) | 55:34 | 2:31 | 3:28:23 | 3:32 | 2:06:01 | 6:36:01 |
| 65 | Jacob Van Der Ploeg (NED) | 55:04 | 2:25 | 3:41:12 | 3:23 | 1:53:59 | 6:36:03 |
| 66 | Igor Varsanyi (SVK) | 1:03:10 | 2:37 | 3:28:46 | 2:08 | 1:59:56 | 6:36:37 |
| 67 | Pekka Lotjonen (FIN) | 52:26 | 2:27 | 3:36:21 | 2:48 | 2:04:19 | 6:38:21 |
| 68 | Jonas Blom (SWE) | 56:31 | 2:06 | 3:28:35 | 2:28 | 2:09:10 | 6:38:50 |
| 69 | Andreas Trondl (AUT) | 58:14 | 2:25 | 3:32:32 | 1:49 | 2:05:07 | 6:40:07 |
| 70 | Alexander Frühwirth (AUT) | 52:40 | 2:27 | 3:34:53 | 3:23 | 2:07:13 | 6:40:36 |
| 71 | Vincent Ribordy (SUI) | 54:15 | 2:22 | 3:30:57 | 2:45 | 2:13:02 | 6:43:21 |
| 72 | Dieter Hollerwoger (AUT) | 54:38 | 2:15 | 3:30:39 | 2:24 | 2:16:42 | 6:46:38 |
| 73 | Hermann Weseli (AUT) | 1:03:49 | 2:28 | 3:21:19 | 2:26 | 2:17:54 | 6:47:56 |
| 74 | Yaniv Atzkon (ISR) | 56:58 | 3:24 | 3:40:01 | 2:08 | 2:07:43 | 6:50:14 |
| 75 | Peter Parioux (BEL) | 49:37 | 2:22 | 3:32:51 | 2:27 | 2:23:05 | 6:50:22 |
| 76 | Americo Pereira (POR) | 1:05:41 | 2:56 | 3:32:18 | 2:37 | 2:07:24 | 6:50:56 |
| 77 | Jose Ferreira (POR) | 1:09:24 | 2:07 | 3:26:42 | 2:23 | 2:12:01 | 6:52:37 |
| 78 | Todd Voss (AUS) | 54:27 | 2:09 | 3:29:46 | 2:02 | 2:26:12 | 6:54:36 |
| 79 | Kevin Ferris (GBR) | 1:04:16 | 2:32 | 3:31:33 | 2:42 | 2:15:18 | 6:56:21 |
| 80 | Pavol Peciar (SVK) | 1:01:01 | 2:42 | 3:37:52 | 2:31 | 2:13:12 | 6:57:18 |
| 81 | Jens Gydesen (DEN) | 57:48 | 2:38 | 3:27:23 | 2:06 | 2:27:51 | 6:57:46 |
| 82 | Simon Tusar (SLO) | 56:28 | 2:28 | 3:41:29 | 2:23 | 2:15:51 | 6:58:39 |
| 83 | Paulo Pereira (POR) | 52:23 | 2:09 | 3:46:47 | 1:47 | 2:17:11 | 7:00:17 |
| 84 | Franz Freinberger (AUT) | 1:08:24 | 2:34 | 3:34:27 | 2:24 | 2:15:44 | 7:03:33 |
| 85 | Harald Kaiser (AUT) | 1:02:15 | 2:23 | 3:45:32 | 3:15 | 2:10:21 | 7:03:46 |
| 86 | Frederico Jacob (POR) | 1:04:26 | 2:30 | 3:37:22 | 2:41 | 2:18:10 | 7:05:09 |
| 87 | Michael Holden Joergensen (DEN) | 1:05:26 | 2:43 | 3:29:38 | 2:37 | 2:27:00 | 7:07:24 |
| 88 | Paolo Alves (POR) | 1:17:49 | 4:05 | 3:38:25 | 2:43 | 2:13:11 | 7:16:13 |
| 89 | Pierre Lorenzi (MON) | 1:16:25 | 2:46 | 3:42:32 | 3:29 | 2:24:24 | 7:29:36 |
| 90 | Mario Machado (POR) | 59:12 | 2:10 | 3:40:04 | 2:39 | 2:49:50 | 7:33:55 |
| 91 | Silvio Benedik (SLO) | 58:40 | 2:27 | 4:03:05 | 2:43 | 2:31:56 | 7:38:51 |
| 92 | Paulo Gonçalves (POR) | 1:35:16 | 3:32 | 3:53:04 | 2:10 | 2:10:10 | 7:44:12 |
| 93 | Joao Maral (POR) | 1:09:12 | 2:39 | 4:13:16 | 4:35 | 2:48:38 | 8:18:20 |
| 94 | Dominique Benassi (FRA) | 1:24:36 | 4:48 | 5:52:17 | 4:16 | 1:31:30 | 8:57:27 |
| 95 | Jean Pierre Astugue (FRA) | 1:42:39 | 6:55 | 5:06:01 | 4:37 | 2:59:57 | 10:00:09 |
Key : DNF - did not finish ; DNS - did not start

=== Women ===
Thirty athletes began the women's elite race on October 1 1996.

| Rank | Athlete | Swim | T1 | Bike | T2 | Run | Overall time |
|---|---|---|---|---|---|---|---|
| 1st place, gold medalist(s) | Jenny Rose (NZL) | 55:23 | 2:20 | 3:28:59 | 2:18 | 1:59:08 | 6:28:08 |
| 2nd place, silver medalist(s) | Ute Schaefer (GER) | 58:38 | 2:26 | 3:31:48 | 2:01 | 2:05:05 | 6:39:58 |
| 3rd place, bronze medalist(s) | Ines Estedt (GER) | 57:33 | 2:50 | 3:36:07 | 2:29 | 2:02:44 | 6:41:43 |
| 4 | Lauren Alexander (USA) | 57:28 | 2:14 | 3:35:09 | 2:08 | 2:06:52 | 6:43:51 |
| 5 | Anne Marie Rouchon (FRA) | 58:15 | 2:01 | 3:43:09 | 1:54 | 2:01:24 | 6:46:43 |
| 6 | Katinka Wiltenburg (NED) | 1:00:07 | 2:22 | 3:42:38 | 2:29 | 1:59:59 | 6:47:35 |
| 7 | Helene Salomon-Watson (FRA) | 1:01:25 | 2:41 | 3:45:43 | 2:19 | 2:00:34 | 6:52:42 |
| 8 | Lydie Reuze (FRA) | 53:38 | 2:03 | 3:48:16 | 1:48 | 2:08:34 | 6:54:19 |
| 9 | Nancy Vallanch (USA) | 55:53 | 2:43 | 3:41:48 | 2:12 | 2:12:11 | 6:54:47 |
| 10 | Gail Watson (AUS) | 55:45 | 2:33 | 3:46:07 | 2:32 | 2:08:30 | 6:55:27 |
| 11 | Brigitte Scheithauer (GER) | 53:26 | 2:21 | 3:47:59 | 2:01 | 2:10:06 | 6:55:53 |
| 12 | Joke Keuning (NED) | 1:00:53 | 2:34 | 3:41:07 | 2:14 | 2:09:11 | 6:55:59 |
| 13 | Catherine Houseaux (FRA) | 1:03:58 | 3:17 | 3:39:11 | 2:50 | 2:07:42 | 6:56:58 |
| 14 | Cornelia Lee Di Pietro (USA) | 1:00:06 | 2:50 | 3:51:38 | 1:40 | 2:02:56 | 6:59:10 |
| 15 | Asa Anderson (SWE) | 58:45 | 2:05 | 3:42:53 | 1:44 | 2:16:29 | 7:01:56 |
| 16 | Jackie Corrigan (GBR) | 57:14 | 2:23 | 3:51:35 | 2:11 | 2:13:08 | 7:06:31 |
| 17 | Karin Jorgensen (DEN) | 1:05:35 | 3:20 | 3:44:10 | 2:40 | 2:12:28 | 7:08:13 |
| 18 | Mirella Gandellini (ITA) | 1:05:06 | 2:36 | 3:43:41 | 2:40 | 2:14:52 | 7:08:55 |
| 19 | Astrid Perathoner (ITA) | 58:46 | 2:31 | 3:46:10 | 2:26 | 2:19:44 | 7:09:37 |
| 20 | Zsófia Perczel (HUN) | 59:06 | 2:51 | 3:56:55 | 2:49 | 2:09:34 | 7:11:15 |
| 21 | Marijke Zeekant (NED) | 56:46 | 2:31 | 3:44:06 | 2:54 | 2:33:48 | 7:20:05 |
| 22 | Ghita Jarlstrom (FIN) | 53:55 | 2:38 | 4:13:37 | 2:37 | 2:08:27 | 7:21:15 |
| 23 | Elise Sachs (USA) | 1:01:25 | 2:35 | 4:05:32 | 2:23 | 2:15:20 | 7:27:15 |
| 24 | Saxi Martinez Squire (GBR) | 1:11:23 | 2:36 | 3:55:50 | 3:01 | 2:15:52 | 7:28:42 |
| 25 | Shirley Yarde (GBR) | 58:40 | 2:27 | 4:03:05 | 2:43 | 2:31:56 | 7:38:51 |
| 26 | Karin Schuch (SUI) | 1:10:41 | 2:20 | 4:00:35 | 2:04 | 2:23:31 | 7:39:11 |
| 27 | Jeanette Pardorf (DEN) | 1:03:04 | 2:21 | 4:19:04 | 3:10 | 2:23:18 | 7:50:57 |
| 28 | Kathy Woods (GBR) | 1:01:16 | 2:43 | 4:03:40 | 2:48 | 2:45:27 | 7:55:54 |
| 29 | Claire Wallington (GBR) | 57:21 | 3:31 | 4:13:34 | 4:17 | 2:39:40 | 7:58:23 |
| 30 | Dagmar Kaiser (AUT) | 1:00:01 | 2:34 | 4:16:31 | 3:14 | 2:51:09 | 8:21:29 |
Key : DNF - did not finish ; DNS - did not start

=== Age-grade championships ===
The following athletes won their age-grade championship race.

| Classification | Athlete | Nation | Overall time |
|---|---|---|---|
| 20-24 Female AG | Blandine Lefebvre | France | 07:14:33 |
| 20-24 Male AG | Guido Gosselink | Netherlands | 06:15:31 |
| 25-29 Female AG | Beate Akmon | Switzerland | 07:04:36 |
| 25-29 Male AG | Laurent Therminot | France | 06:14:55 |
| 30-34 Female AG | Veronique Salvador | France | 07:22:40 |
| 30-34 Male AG | Michael Prufert | Germany | 06:08:22 |
| 35-39 Female AG | Elke Bibus | Germany | 07:46:37 |
| 35-39 Male AG | Matias Llobet Vallvé | Spain | 06:22:45 |
| 40-44 Female AG | Trijnie Roozendaal-Rep | Netherlands | 08:32:51 |
| 40-44 Male AG | Eric Thys | Belgium | 06:33:17 |
| 45-49 Female AG | Lesley Tuggle | United States | 08:49:34 |
| 45-49 Male AG | Yves Tabarant | France | 06:16:36 |
| 50-54 Female AG | Sylvaine Gogot | France | 10:40:29 |
| 50-54 Male AG | Marc Vaidis | France | 07:47:07 |
| 55-59 Female AG | Daphne Belt | Great Britain | 10:00:47 |
| 55-59 Male AG | Hans Dieben | Netherlands | 07:26:43 |
| 60-64 Male AG | Jean Zabek | France | 07:54:31 |
| 65-69 Male AG | Juergen Oertwig | Germany | 10:15:56 |
