= Pedro Cordero =

Pedro Cordero may refer to:

- Pedro Cordero (footballer) (born 1968), Spanish football director and former footballer
- Pedro Cordero (boccia) (born 1972), Spanish boccia player

== See also ==
- Pedro Cordeiro (disambiguation)
