= Tri Dubai =

Tri-Dubai was the first major professional triathlon team composed of ten athletes both male and female who competed at long distance (Ironman) in the sport. These athletes have made a significant mark on the Ironman circuit over the years, netting many wins around the globe. The athletes have also competed and placed well on the Ironman 70.3 tour and in many Long course Triathlon races. In 2006, the team placed 1-2-3 at the infamous Ironman Hawaii and then 1-2-4-4 at the Ironman 70.3 World Championships.

The team was significant at the time because there had never been a more stacked group of superstars under one umbrella. They dominated the headlines of the sport and did so by focusing on winning performances and matching prize money with charitable donations, oftentimes local organizations to the race venues. The team was co-founded and owned by His Highness Sheikh Mohammed bin Rashid Al Maktoum (Crowne Prince of Dubai] and American entrepreneur, Franko Vatterott. The purpose was originally to advertise Dubai as a business partner and leisure destination to the relatively affluent and high-achieving demographic of triathletes worldwide. The team paved the way for the marketing model to be followed by many teams that have arisen in professional triathlon. Vatterott continued his ventures into the sport by starting a professional sports agency, The Human Interest Group, and went on to manage several of his former athletes on the Tri Dubai team. One of them was Craig Alexander, who went on to win 5 Ironman World titles at both the 70.3 and Ironman Hawaii. The Human Interest Group is one of the leading sports management firms in professional triathlon today. The athlete portfolio can be found at professionaltriathlon.com

The team was disbanded after 2 seasons after His Highness was sworn in as the Ruler of Dubai and the Prime Minister of the UAE.

== Triathletes ==
2006 season:

- Craig Alexander - Australia Three time Ironman World Champion, Two time Ironman 70.3 World Champion
- Lisa Bentley - Canada
- Cameron Brown - New Zealand
- Tim DeBoom - United States of America Two time Ironman World Champion
- Desiree Ficker - United States of America
- Joanna Lawn - New Zealand
- Chris Legh - Australia
- Simon Lessing - United Kingdom
- Normann Stadler - Germany Two time Ironman World Champion
- Heather Fuhr - CANADA Ironman World Champion

=== Former Members ===
- Peter Reid - Canada Three time Ironman World Champion (retired)
