= Eimear Mullan =

Irish professional triathlete

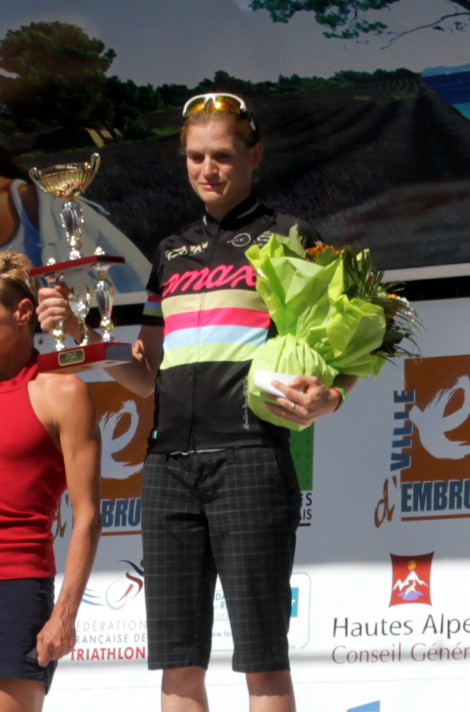
- Irish triathlete

Personal information
- Nickname: Emu
- Nationality: Irish
- Born: 21 May 1982 (age 43) Portstewart
- Occupation: Athlete
- Height: 1.69
- Weight: 55 kg (121 lb)
- Spouse: Ritchie Nicholls

Sport
- Event: Triathlon
- Updated on 18 May 2017

Eimear Nicholls née Mullan (born 21 May 1982) Portstewart is an Irish former professional triathlete who competes and wins Ironman competitions. Eimear is a multiple Ironman and 70.3 winner and over 30 professional podiums. She holds the Irish Ironman record and is Ireland's only Ironman champion. Currently Eimear is a para triathlon guide and competed at the Paris 2024 Paralympics in the PTVI category with Judith MacCombe. She now lives and trains in Portstewart, County Londonderry and has 2 children.

== Life ==
=== Early career ===
Before taking up the triathlon Eimear Mullan practiced at the tetrathlon. At university, she studied sports psychology. She graduated in 2007 as a physical education teacher and then she spent some time traveling. She then started to cycle as a sport and this led her to the triathlon. As an amateur, she had already won some national competitions at both sprint and Olympic distance.

=== Triathlon ===
Eimear Mullan began her professional career in 2011. In 2012, she won Ironman UK in Bolton and the Ironman 70.3 in Somerset. She became the first Irish winner on Ironman and is the current Irish Ironman record holder with a time of 8.56.51 (Ironman Barcelona 2015). In 2013, she suspended her teaching career to devote herself fully to her sporting career and joined the TBB team where she was coached by Bella Bayliss and Brett Sutton. In 2014 after representing Northern Ireland at the Commonwealth games in Glasgow she went on to claim the top stop of the Embrunman podium in France. after a third place acquired the year before. In September 2014 she won a fourth victory at an XXL distance when she won the inaugural Ironman of Mallorca. She was elected Irish triathlete of the year in 2014. After a long injury break Eimear returned to racing in November's 2017 with a victory at Ironman 70.3 Xiamen in China.

== Results ==
2015	Ironman Barcelona	Spain	4th	8h 56' 51"
2015	Ironman 70.3 Budapest	Hungary	First	4h 14' 56"
2014	Ironman Majorque	Spain	First	9h 14' 17"
2014	Embrunman	France	First	11h 29' 36"
2014	Challenge Sardinien XL	Italy	First	4h 27' 47"
2014	Triathlon de Gérardmer XL	France	Silver medal	timing
2014	Ironman 70.3 Somerset	United Kingdom	First	4h 52' 07"
2014	Challenge XL Rimini	Italy	First	timing
2014	Challenge XL Fuerteventura	Spain	Silver medal	4h 36' 08"
2014	Triathlon XL Internacional Portocolom	Spain	First	3h 59' 27"
2013	Ironman 70.3 Miami	United States	Bronze medal	4h 12' 39"
2013	Ironman 70.3 Salzburg	Austria	First	timing
2013	Ironman 70.3 Somerset	United Kingdom	First	4h 56' 59"
2013	Challenge XL Fuerteventura	Spain	Silver medal	timing
2013	Embrunman	France	Bronze medal	11h 27' 29"
2013	Triathlon EDF Alpe d'Huez XL	France	Silver medal	6h 41' 39"
2013	Ironman Klagenfurt	Austria	First	9h 05' 46"
2012	Iromamn Pembrokeshire	United Kingdom	Silver medal	10h 01' 32"
2012	Ironman Royaume-Uni	United Kingdom	First	10h 08' 44"
2012	Ironman 70.3 Somerset	United Kingdom	First	4h 53' 33"
2012	TriStar111 Portocolom	Spain	First	4h 19' 49"
2011	TriStar111 Monaco	Monaco	Silver medal	timing
2011	Ironman 70.3 Somerset	United Kingdom	Silver medal	timing
2011	TriStar111 Portocolom	Spain	First	4h 10' 27"
