= Yves Cordier =

French triathlete (born 1964)

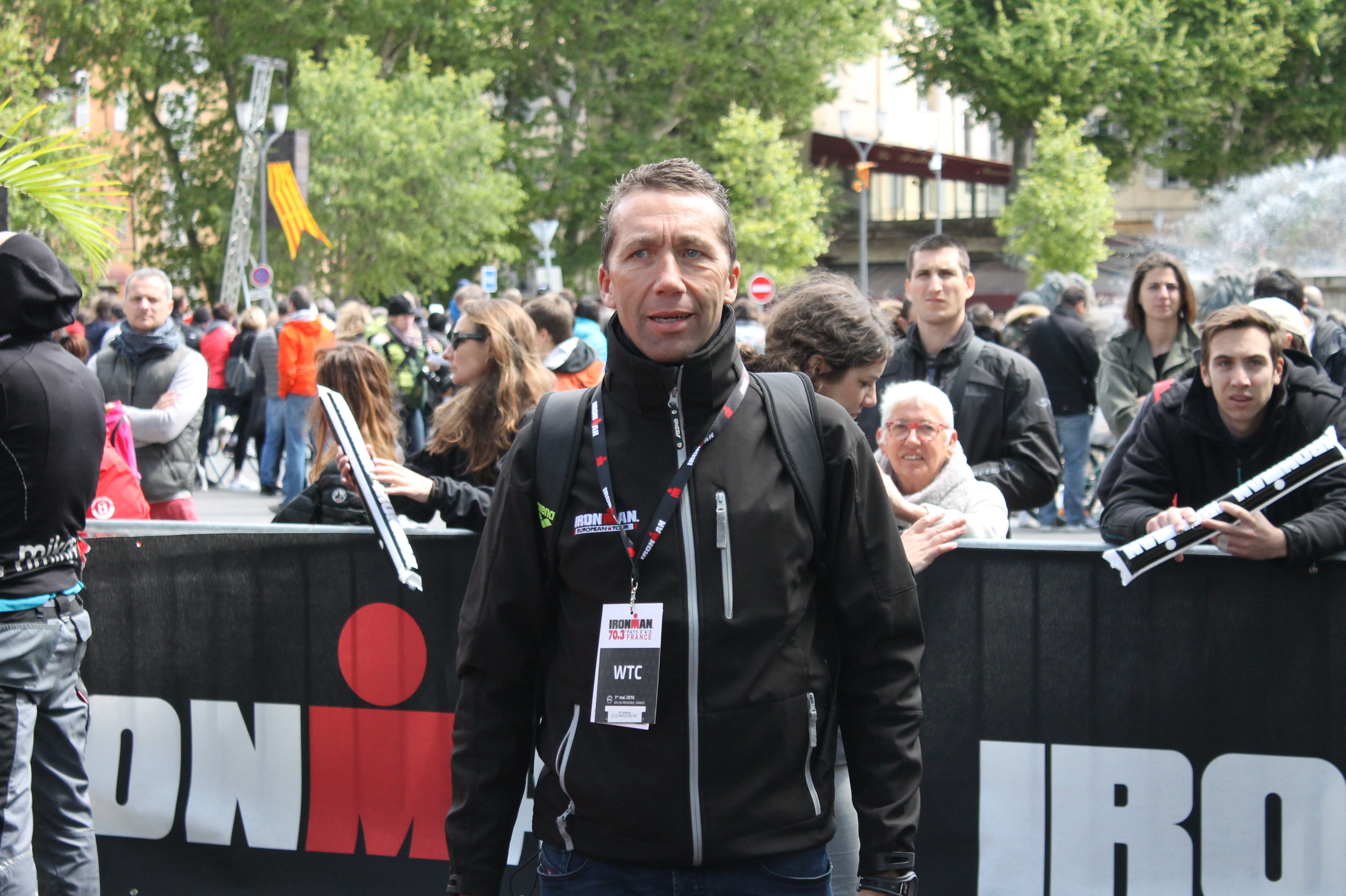
- Cordier at the 2016 Ironman 70.3 Pays d'Aix

Personal information
- Nationality: French
- Born: 15 July 1964 (age 62) Paris, France

Sport
- Sport: Triathlon
- Retired: 2002
Medal record
Men's triathlon
Representing France
World Long Distance Championships
Bronze medal – third place	1994 Nice	Individual
European Triathlon Championships
Gold medal – first place	1989 Cascais	Individual

Yves Cordier (born 15 July 1964) is a French former professional triathlete, coach, and race director. A pioneer of elite triathlon in France during the 1980s and 1990s, he won the gold medal at the 1989 European Triathlon Championships in Cascais and the bronze medal at the inaugural 1994 ITU Long Distance Triathlon World Championships in Nice. He also won the Embrunman long-distance triathlon five times between 1987 and 1999, holding the event's all-time victory record until 2017.

Following his retirement from elite competition in 2002, Cordier became the managing director and race director of Ironman France, overseeing the transition of the Triathlon International de Nice into Ironman France in 2005 as well as the creation of Ironman events in Aix-en-Provence and Vichy.

== Athletic career ==
=== Early years and European title (1983–1989) ===
Born in Paris, Cordier began competing in triathlon in 1983 and made his long-distance debut in 1984 at age 20 at the Triathlon International de Nice, then regarded as the premier European counterpart to the Ironman World Championship in Hawaii. Known as an exceptionally strong swimmer, he posted the fastest swim split at the inaugural 1985 European Triathlon Championships in Immenstadt and finished third at the Embrunman in 1986.

In 1987, Cordier won his first Embrunman title in the French Alps - a race in which his brother, Jean-Gabriel Cordier, finished third. He successfully defended his Embrunman crown in 1988, the same year he won the French Long Distance Triathlon National Championship and placed third at the Triathlon International de Nice.

Cordier achieved his breakthrough international victory on 11 June 1989 at the 1989 European Triathlon Championships in Cascais, Portugal. Contested over the standard Olympic distance (1.5 km swim, 40 km bike, 10 km run), Cordier posted the fastest cycling split of the race to win in 2:02:08, defeating four-time defending champion Rob Barel of the Netherlands and West Germany's Jürgen Zäck .

Later that year, he placed eighth overall at the 1989 Ironman World Championship in Kailua-Kona in 8:39:13.

=== Long-distance battles and Embrunman dominance (1990–2002) ===
During the early 1990s, Cordier was a regular contender on both the ITU World Cup circuit and the Triathlon International de Nice, where he had frequent duels with six-time Ironman world champion Mark Allen and Scott Molina. After finishing third in Nice in 1991 (6:08:45) and winning the French Middle Distance National Championship in Arcachon in 1992, Cordier came within 400 metres of winning the 1992 Triathlon International de Nice before being overtaken in the closing stages by Allen, finishing second in 6:00:50. In 1993, he earned a bronze medal at the Embrun stop of the ITU Triathlon World Cup.

In June 1994, Nice hosted the inaugural ITU Long Distance Triathlon World Championships, where Cordier won the individual bronze medal in 6:03:09 behind Rob Barel and Germany's Lothar Leder, as well as a team bronze medal for France. He returned to Nice for the 1995 World Long Distance Championships, placing seventh individually and winning team gold with the French squad.

Cordier continued to dominate the Embrunman throughout the decade, capturing further victories in 1994 , 1998, and 1999 to bring his career total to five titles. He remained on the Embrunman podium into his late thirties, finishing second in 2000 and 2001, and third in 2002 before retiring from full-time professional racing at the end of the 2002 season. After a 15-year hiatus from the long-distance race, he returned as an age-group entrant for the 35th anniversary edition of the Embrunman in August 2018, though he did not finish.

== Coaching and event management ==
Following his retirement as an athlete in 2002, Cordier served as head coach of the triathlon section at Olympic Nice Natation from 2002 to 2018, coaching French international triathletes including Jeanne Collonge, Delphine Pelletier, Romain Guillaume, and Christel Robin. He also served as president of ASPTT Nice in 1994 and was appointed vice-president in charge of high-performance sport at the French Triathlon Federation (FFTRI) in 2020.

In 2005, Cordier partnered with municipal authorities in Nice and the World Triathlon Corporation to rebrand and relaunch the historic Triathlon International de Nice as Ironman France. As race director and managing director of Ironman France, he expanded the organisation's calendar in France to include Ironman 70.3 Pays d'Aix (launched in 2011) and Ironman and Ironman 70.3 Vichy (launched in 2015), and later oversaw Nice's selection as co-host of the Ironman World Championship.

On 5 March 2025, Nice mayor Christian Estrosi awarded Cordier the Gold Médaille de la jeunesse, des sports et de l'engagement associatif in recognition of his four decades of contributions to French triathlon and local sport.

== Major results ==
Year	Competition	Venue	Position	Time	Ref.
1986	Embrunman	Embrun, France	3rd place, bronze medalist(s)	-	
1987	Embrunman	Embrun, France	1st place, gold medalist(s)	-	
1988	Embrunman	Embrun, France	1st place, gold medalist(s)	-	
1988	French Long Distance Championships	France	1st place, gold medalist(s)	-	
1988	Triathlon International de Nice	Nice, France	3rd place, bronze medalist(s)	-	
1989	European Championships	Cascais, Portugal	1st place, gold medalist(s)	2:02:08	
1989	Ironman World Championship	Kailua-Kona, United States	8th	8:39:13	
1991	Triathlon International de Nice	Nice, France	3rd place, bronze medalist(s)	6:08:45	
1992	French Middle Distance Championships	Arcachon, France	1st place, gold medalist(s)	-	
1992	Triathlon International de Nice	Nice, France	2nd place, silver medalist(s)	6:00:50	
1993	ITU Triathlon World Cup	Embrun, France	3rd place, bronze medalist(s)	2:19:53	
1994	World Long Distance Championships	Nice, France	3rd place, bronze medalist(s)	6:03:09	
1994	Embrunman	Embrun, France	1st place, gold medalist(s)	10:10:03	
1995	World Long Distance Championships	Nice, France	7th	5:54:03	
1998	Embrunman	Embrun, France	1st place, gold medalist(s)	10:19:51	
1999	Embrunman	Embrun, France	1st place, gold medalist(s)	10:14:49	
2000	Ironman South Africa	Gordon's Bay, South Africa	4th	9:06:00	
2000	Ironman Lanzarote	Puerto del Carmen, Spain	8th	9:10:18	
2000	Embrunman	Embrun, France	2nd place, silver medalist(s)	10:07:38	
2000	Ironman World Championship	Kailua-Kona, United States	DNF	-	
2001	Embrunman	Embrun, France	2nd place, silver medalist(s)	10:00:40	
2002	Embrunman	Embrun, France	3rd place, bronze medalist(s)	10:14:47	

== Publications ==
- Cordier, Yves; Malaurent, Max (1991). Triathlon : technique, tactique, entraînement (in French). Paris: Éditions Robert Laffont. ISBN 978-2-221-07155-7.
