= Sian Welch =

American former triathlete (born 1966)

Personal information
- Born: June 14, 1966 (age 60)

Sport
- Country: United States

Sian Welch is an American former triathlete.

== Career ==
She has been married since 1993 to former Australian professional triathlete Greg Welch.

In 1994, she won the Escape from Alcatraz Triathlon in San Francisco. In November 1996, she came in third in at the Cross Triathlon World Cup in Hawaii. In 1997, she became national triathlon champion on the short distance.

In 2000, she ended her pro career—three months after her husband Greg announced his retirement.

== Ironman Hawaii 1997 ==
In October 1997, she and her compatriot Wendy Ingraham delivered a thrilling duel for fourth place on the final stretch of the Ironman Hawaii, as the two were dehydrated and exhausted overturned and could only crawl to the finish on all fours. Sian Welch finished fifth in this competition.

== Ironman Australia 1998 ==
In April 1998, the 31-year-old won the Ironman Australia.

== Ironman Hawaii 2017 ==
In February 2017, she announced that 20 years after her spectacular finish ("The Crawl"), she would like to race again in Kona this year. The 50-year-old Sian started after more than 10 years break from racing in April at Ironman 70.3 in Liuzhou, China and was qualified as the winner of their age group again for a starting place at Ironman Hawaii in October. She finished the race in 11:49:31.
