= Thea Sijbesma =

Dutch triathlete and duathlete

Thea Sybesma
Personal information
- Full name: Teatske Sybesma
- Other names: Thea Sijbesma
- Nationality: Netherlands
- Born: 18 November 1960 (age 66) Idskenhuizen, Netherlands
- Occupations: Orthopedic surgeon, healthcare executive
- Height: 1.73 m (5 ft 8 in)
- Spouse: Mieke Havik

Sport
- Sport: Triathlon, duathlon
- Club: GVAV-Rapiditas
Medal record
Women's duathlon
World Triathlon Duathlon Championships
Gold medal – first place	1990 Cathedral City	Individual
Europe Triathlon Duathlon Championships
Gold medal – first place	1990 Zofingen	Individual
Gold medal – first place	1991 Birmingham	Individual
Gold medal – first place	1992 Madrid	Individual
Women's triathlon
World Triathlon Long Distance Championships
Bronze medal – third place	1991 Almere	Individual
Europe Triathlon Championships
Gold medal – first place	1990 Linz	Individual
Gold medal – first place	1991 Roth	Long distance
Bronze medal – third place	1992 Joroinen	Middle distance

Teatske "Thea" Sybesma (also spelled Thea Sijbesma; born 18 November 1960) is a Dutch former professional triathlete and duathlete, and an orthopedic surgeon and healthcare executive. In 1990, she won the inaugural World Triathlon Duathlon Championships as well as the Europe Triathlon Duathlon Championships and the standard-distance Europe Triathlon Championships. In 1991, she became the first woman in history to complete an Ironman-distance triathlon in under nine hours.

== Early life and education ==
Sybesma was born in Idskenhuizen, Friesland, Netherlands, on 18 November 1960. She studied medicine and physiotherapy at the University of Groningen during the 1980s. In 1986, she joined the triathlon section of the Groningen sports club GVAV-Rapiditas.

== Athletic career ==
After completing her university studies, Sybesma focused full-time on triathlon and duathlon starting in January 1991, while continuing part-time research on hip prostheses.

She won her first Dutch national title in 1989 and went on to win the Almere long-distance triathlon three consecutive times (1990, 1991, and 1992). In 1990, she captured gold medals at the 1990 European Triathlon Championships in Linz (standard distance), the inaugural 1990 ITU Duathlon World Championships in Cathedral City, California and the Europe Triathlon Duathlon Championships in Zofingen. She successfully defended her European duathlon title in 1991 and 1992.

On 13 July 1991, Sybesma won Ironman Europe in Roth, Germany - which also served as the European Long Distance Triathlon Championships - in a time of 8:55:29, becoming the first female triathlete to break the nine-hour barrier over the full Ironman distance. At the Ironman World Championship in Kailua-Kona, she placed fourth in 1991 and won bronze in 1992 behind Paula Newby-Fraser and Erin Baker.

In February 1993, she won the Apeldoorn Marathon, and later that year won Ironman Australia in Forster.

She retired from elite competition in May 1993 following the duathlon in Zofingen to begin her medical residency.

In 2000, the Dutch Triathlon Federation (NTB) named its annual athlete of the year honour the Thea Sybesma Award in recognition of her achievements.

== Medical career and sports administration ==
In 1992, Sybesma was accepted into a six-year residency program in orthopedic surgery, beginning full-time at Medisch Spectrum Twente in June 1993. In 1999, she became an orthopedic surgeon at St. Anna Hospital in Geldrop, specializing in hip, knee, and sports injuries. She earned her PhD in 2002 with research focused on hip prostheses.

She transitioned into healthcare executive leadership, joining the executive board of Anna Zorggroep in October 2020 and becoming chair of its board of directors in July 2022. In March 2022, she also joined the interim board of the Dutch Triathlon Federation (NTB) to help restructure the organization and served as acting chair until January 2023.

== Personal life ==
Sybesma lives in Heeze, North Brabant, and is married to former Dutch racing cyclist Mieke Havik.

== Major achievements ==
Year	Competition	Location	Rank	Time
1990	Europe Triathlon Championships (Standard)	Linz, Austria	1st place, gold medalist(s)	02:04:00
1990	World Triathlon Duathlon Championships	Cathedral City, United States	1st place, gold medalist(s)	-
1990	Europe Triathlon Duathlon Championships	Zofingen, Switzerland	1st place, gold medalist(s)	-
1990	Almere Triathlon (Long distance)	Almere, Netherlands	1st place, gold medalist(s)	09:20:35
1991	Ironman Europe / European Long Distance Championships	Roth, Germany	1st place, gold medalist(s)	08:55:29
1991	Europe Triathlon Duathlon Championships	Birmingham, United Kingdom	1st place, gold medalist(s)	-
1991	World Triathlon Long Distance Championships	Almere, Netherlands	3rd place, bronze medalist(s)	09:08:03
1992	Europe Triathlon Duathlon Championships	Madrid, Spain	1st place, gold medalist(s)	-
1992	Almere Triathlon (Long distance)	Almere, Netherlands	1st place, gold medalist(s)	09:05:53
1992	Ironman World Championship	Kailua-Kona, United States	3rd place, bronze medalist(s)	09:26:57
1993	Ironman Australia	Forster, Australia	1st place, gold medalist(s)	-
