= Melanie Burke =

New Zealand athlete

Melanie Burke is an athlete from New Zealand. She has been a national champion or New Zealand representative in rowing, road running, cycling, duathlon, and Ironman triathlon.

Burke grew up on a farm in near Whanganui, New Zealand. She moved to Auckland in 2001.

In her early sports career Burke specialised in rowing. By age 24, she had placed fourth and fifth in the coxless fours at consecutive world championships. She was invited to trial for the 2004 Summer Olympics team, however in the absence of a coxless fours event, she decided to move into athletics and running instead.

Burke ran, and won, a number of marathons before Bike New Zealand approached her to trial as a road cyclist. Burke was immediately successful, but, because she didn't want to travel overseas for cycling events, she changed her focus again, to multisports.

In 2011 Burke competed in the ITU Powerman Long Distance Duathlon World Championships in Switzerland and won the event. In 2012 she competed again, finishing seventh. In 2013 she won the New Zealand national women's duathlon title. In 2014 she competed in the World Ironman Triathlon Championships in Kona, Hawai`i.

| Date | Event | Position | Time |
|---|---|---|---|
| Jan 2013 | IRONMAN 70.3 Auckland | 14 | 4:50:12 |
| Mar 2013 | IRONMAN New Zealand | 6 | 10:09:02 |
| Sep 2013 | IRONMAN 70.3 Sunshine Coast | 5 | 4:38:24 |
| Nov 2013 | IRONMAN 70.3 Mandurah | 7 | 4:27:28 |
| Dec 2013 | IRONMAN Western Australia | 5 | 9:27:08 |
| Jan 2014 | IRONMAN 70.3 Auckland | 9 | 4:42:24 |
| Mar 2014 | IRONMAN New Zealand | 8 | 9:51:41 |
| May 2014 | IRONMAN Australia | 3 | 9:32:53 |
| Jun 2014 | IRONMAN Asia-Pacific Championship Cairns | 2 | 9:22:53 |
| Aug 2014 | IRONMAN Mont-Tremblant | 5 | 9:54:21 |
| Oct 2014 | IRONMAN World Championship | 26 | 9:54:04 |
| Jan 2015 | IRONMAN 70.3 Auckland | 6 | 4:42:12 |
| Mar 2015 | IRONMAN New Zealand | 3 | 9:41:51 |
| Oct 2015 | IRONMAN 70.3 Port Macquarie | 7 | 4:43:42 |
| Dec 2015 | IRONMAN 70.3 Taupo | 8 | 4:41:35 |
| Feb 2016 | IRONMAN 70.3 Geelong | 12 | 4:41:16 |
| Mar 2016 | IRONMAN New Zealand | 11 | 9:49:12 |
| May 2016 | IRONMAN Australia | 3 | 9:56:54 |
| Feb 2018 | IRONMAN 70.3 Geelong | 5 | 4:34:47 |
| May 2018 | IRONMAN Australia | 2 | 9:29:50 |
| Jun 2018 | IRONMAN Asia-Pacific Championship Cairns | 5 | 9:12:31 |
| Jul 2018 | IRONMAN Switzerland | 7 | 9:38:51 |
| Oct 2018 | IRONMAN World Championship | 23 | 9:25:02 |
| Mar 2019 | IRONMAN New Zealand | 6 | 9:41:36 |
| May 2019 | IRONMAN Australia | 4 | 9:26:54 |
