= Eduardo Burguete =

Spanish modern pentathlete (1962–2023)

Personal information
- Born: 4 January 1962 Valencia, Spain
- Died: 27 February 2023 (aged 61)

Sport
- Sport: Modern pentathlon

Eduardo Burguete (4 January 1962 – 27 February 2023) was a Spanish modern pentathlete. He competed at the 1984 Summer Olympics.

Burguete died on 27 February 2023, at the age of 61.
