= Idskenhuizen =

Idskenhuizen Jiskenhuzen
- Village
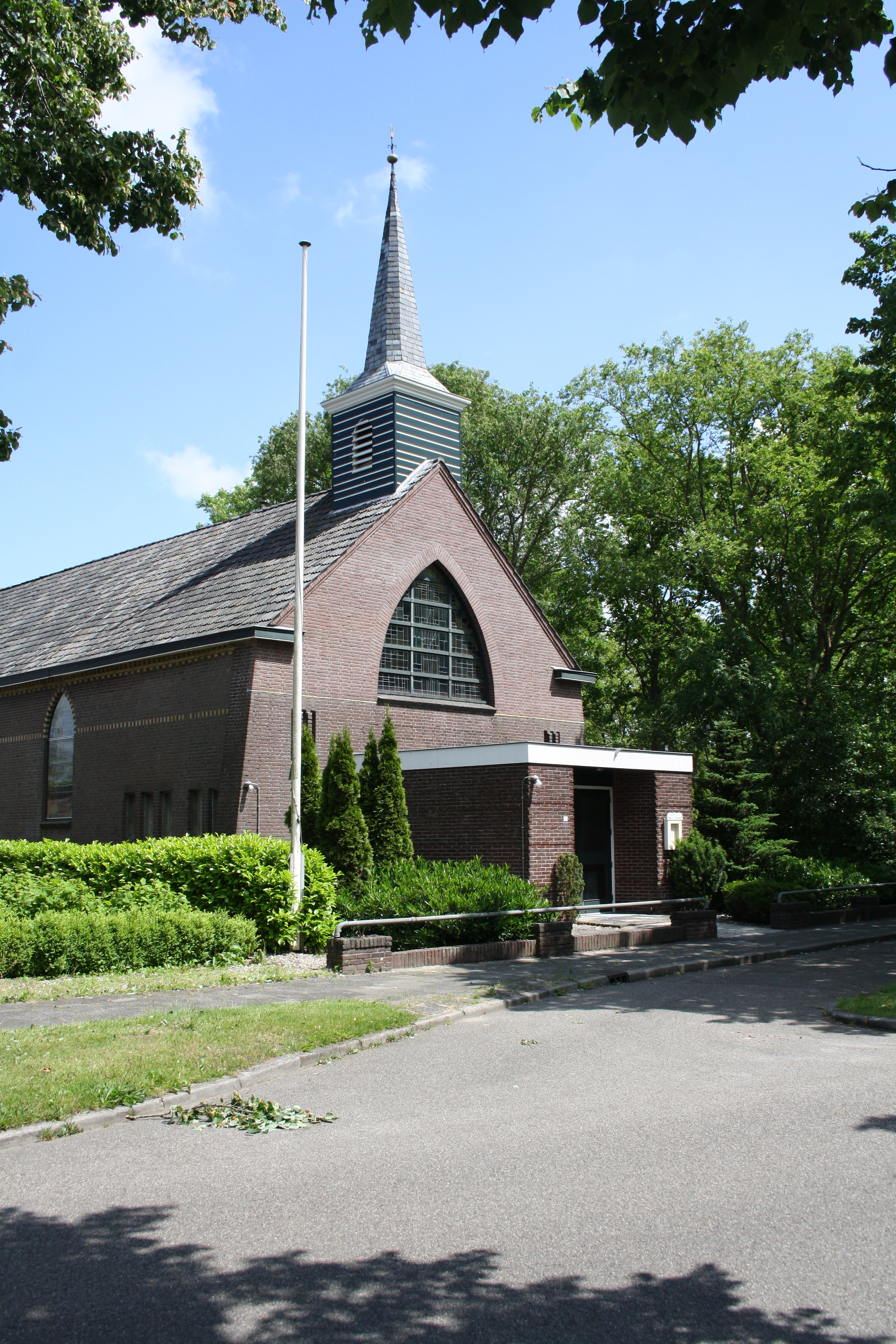
- Idskenhuizen church

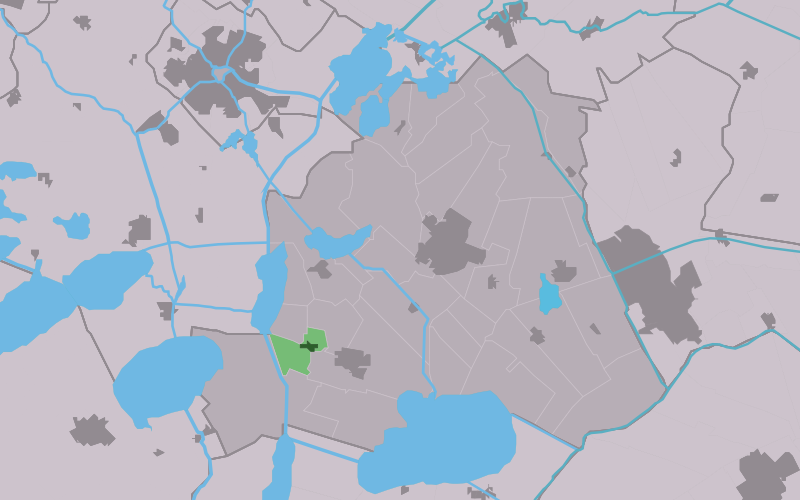
- Location in the former Skarsterlân municipality

- Location in the Netherlands Idskenhuizen (Netherlands)
- Country: Netherlands
- Province: Friesland
- Municipality: De Fryske Marren

Area
  - Total: 2.31 km^{2} (0.89 sq mi)
- Elevation: 0.6 m (2.0 ft)

Population (2021)
  - Total: 490
  - Density: 210/km^{2} (550/sq mi)
- Time zone: UTC+1 (CET)
  - Summer (DST): UTC+2 (CEST)
- Postal code: 8523
- Dialing code: 0513

Idskenhuizen (West Frisian: Jiskenhuzen) is a village in De Fryske Marren municipality in the province of Friesland, the Netherlands. It had a population of around 480 in 2017.

== History ==
The village as first mentioned in 1495 as Eesken hwsen, and means "settlement of Eesk/Eeske (person)". Around 1500, the villa Roordastins was located near the village. In 1840, it was home to 296 people. The Protestant church dates from 1889, and is a replacement of an earlier church.

Before 2014, Idskenhuizen was part of the Skarsterlân municipality and before 1984 it was part of Doniawerstal.

== Gallery ==
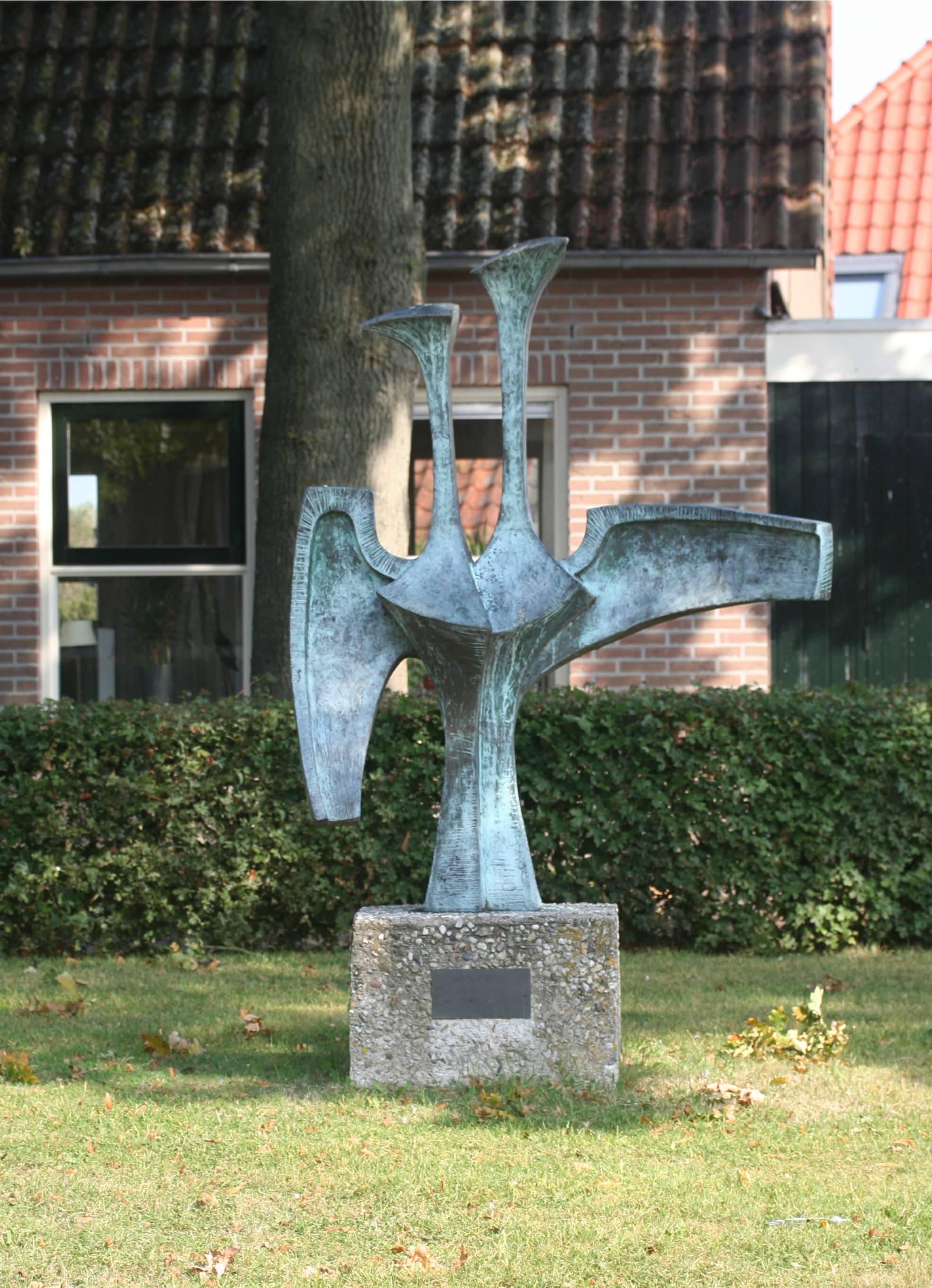
Art in Idskenhuizen

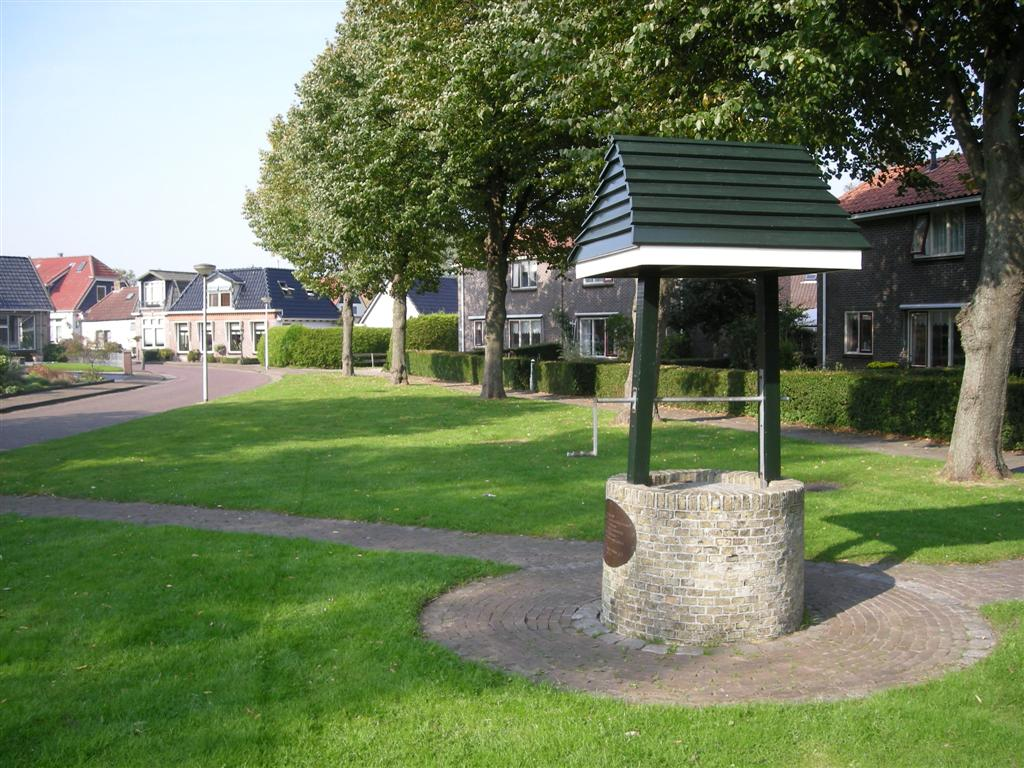
Well in Idskenhuizen
