= Embrunman =

Triathlon competition in Embrun, France

Coordinates: 44.5658°N 6.4961°E

- Date: August
- Location: Embrun, Haute Alpes, France
- Event type: Triathlon
- Distance: 3.8 km (2.4 mi); 186 km (116 mi); 42,195 km (26,219 mi)
- Established: 1984
- Course records: Men: 9h 26m 18s Léon Chevalier (2021); Women 10h 26m 26s Carrie Lester (2016)
- Website: embrunman.com
- Participants: 3500 Professionals and amateurs in all events, 1500 in long distance event.

The Embrunman is a long distance triathlon held on August 15 each year around Embrun in the Hautes-Alpes, France. It is an equivalent triathlon consisting of a swim of 3.8 km, a 186 km cycle ride and running a marathon (42.195 km), but is not affiliated with the World Triathlon Corporation which owns the brand Ironman, so is not promoted as such. The French newspaper Le Dauphiné libéré described it in 2012 as the hardest triathlon in the world. The men's record time for the event is 9 h 28m 18 s by the Frenchman Léon Chevalier on August 15, 2021 and the women's record is held by Carrie Lester from Australia at 10 h 46 m 26 s. The men's record number of victories in this event is held by spanish triathlete Marcel Zamora Pérez with six wins (2009, 2010, 2012, 2013, 2014, 2017), and women's record by Briton Bella Bayliss Commerford with 3 victories (2002, 2008, 2009).

The Embrunman is the culmination of a multi day series of events dedicated to the sport of triathlon with an Olympic distance triathlon (1.5 km (0.93 mi) swim, 43.5 km (27.0 mi) bike, 10 km (6.2 mi) run) and events reserved for youth and beginners.

== History ==
=== Beginnings ===
The first event was held on the 19 August 1984, but was only a hint of what it would become. It had a 750 m swim, 30 km bike and 10 km race walk. However, the first bike ride included the steep climb up the Cote de Chalvet (indeed the competitors had to tackle it twice) and which still features today at the end of the bike stage - triathletes today still call it "The Beast"

In 1985, the event was given the organisation of the standard distance triathlon championship of France. The route was adapted by lengthening the distance to 1,500 m swim, 70 km bike and 21 km run on a difficult circuit. 280 triathletes participated in the event, backed by 200 volunteers and 20,000 supporters.

=== A long distance event ===
In 1986 the Embrun triathlon became a long distance event with a 4 km swim, 131.5 km bike and 42.2 km run. The organisers claimed at the time that among all categories of triathlon it was the most difficult in the world. In 1987, the distances were increased to 5 km swimming, 180 km cycling and 42 2 km of running. A larger climb was introduced of 2600 m on the bike course and 400 m in the marathon. The event's popularity increased with 420 competitors, 480 volunteers and a large audience attending the event. In 1989, the swimming distance of long-distance triathlon was reduced to 3800 m, to meet the specifications of the French Triathlon Federation (FFTRI). In 1990, the route was changed for the last time with the introduction, in the bike portion, of the ascent of the Col d'Izoard. This new route of 186 km in one loop is characterized by increased difficulty: 3600 m of climbing.

In 2008, despite the competition of the Olympic Games in Beijing, the event see a record of number of participates with 1260 registered on the long route and 600 on the short. Despite awful weather the race is held, although there are over 110 dropouts during the descent of the Izoard. In 2010, the event supports the twinning of the town of Embrun with the Thai island of Ko Samui with the creation of a long-distance triathlon on the island. The planned first event in 2011 was canceled due to natural disasters, but an event took place on 22 April 2012.

=== The short distance triathlon ===
In 1988, in addition to the long-distance triathlon, an Olympic distance triathlon (triathlon M) was started, with 1.5 km swim, 43.5 km bike, and 10 km run. 520 competitors, 600 volunteers and 40,000 spectators participate in this event. In 1991, the Embrun short distance triathlon became a stage of the World Cup triathlon, a competition with 11 stages and held across 5 continents. For this event, the bike course was totally changed, with greater technical challenge and a vertical climb of 1,200 m located mainly on the first part of the course. 1,260 triathletes participated in the various formats as well as 1,000 volunteers and nearly 100,000 spectators. As part of its tenth event in 1993, Embrun hosts a stage of the World Cup triathlon for the third consecutive time. The attendance increased, to a record with 1,500 triathletes involved in various formats, 1300 volunteers, and over 100,000 spectators. It was not until 1997 that the short distance triathlon Embrun was a stage of the World Cup triathlon again, and for the last time. To date, with these 4 appearances, Embrum is the French triathlon which has most often hosted a stage of the World Cup circuit.

== The Current Embrunman ==
The 30th staging of the Embrunman in 2013 saw several events spread over five days of racing:

- Long Distance Triathlon: 3.8 km: swimming, 186 km cycling, 42.2 km of running. The bike ascent is more than 3600 m and 400 m ascent in the run.
- Short Triathlon : 1.5 km swim, 43.5 km bike, 10 km of running
- Triathlon Sprint: 750 m swim, 18 km bike, 5 km run
- Aquathlon : 1 km swim, 5 km run
- Duathlon : 5 km Running, 19.1 km bike, 2.5 km run. The bike ride has a climb of 245 m
- Run & bike : 22.5 km for a team of two competitors with one bike for a total vertical climb of 730 m.
- A triathlon reserved for juniors with specific distances for each age class.

3500 triathletes, amateurs or professionals, juniors and veterans participated in these competitions, including 1000 registered on the short-distance triathlon and 1500 inscribed on the long distance triathlon.

== Long distance event winners ==
=== Male winners ===
Year	Winner	Time
1984	(France) Gérard Honnorat	
1985	(Switzerland) Alain Dallenbach	
1986	(West Germany) Dirk Aschmoneit	
1987	(France) Yves Cordier	
1988	(France) Yves Cordier	
1989	(Denmark) Klöczl Gabor	
1990	(Denmark) Klöczl Gabor	10 h 31 min
1991	(United States) Scott Molina	10 h 19 min
1992	(Netherlands) Pim Van den Bos	10 h 09 min
1993	(France) Philippe Lie	10 h 08 min 01 s
1994	(France) Yves Cordier	10 h 10 min
1995	(France) Philippe Lie	10 h 08 min
1996	(Netherlands) Floris Jan Koole	10 h 24 min 48 s
1997	(France) Philippe Lie	10 h 28 min
1998	(France) Yves Cordier	10 h 19 min 51 s
1999	(France) Yves Cordier	10 h 14 min 49 s
2000	(France) François Chabaud	10 h 01 min 49 s
2001	(Spain) Félix Rubio Martinez	9 h 57 min 37 s
2002	(Spain) Félix Rubio Martinez	10 h 07 min 41 s
2003	(France) Cyril Neveu	9 h 59 min 21 s
2004	(Spain) Félix Rubio Martinez	10 h 02 min 43 s
2005	(Spain) Félix Rubio Martinez	9 h 59 min 32 s
2006	(France) Hervé Faure	9 h 54 min 31 s
2007	(France) Hervé Faure	9 h 48 min 58 s
2008	(France) Xavier Le Floch	10 h 06 min 35 s
2009	(Spain) Marcel Zamora Perez	9 h 39 min 45 s
2010	(Spain) Marcel Zamora Perez	9 h 38 min 49 s
2011	(France) Hervé Faure	9 h 34 min 10 s
2012	(Spain) Marcel Zamora Perez	9 h 39 min 23 s
2013	(Spain) Marcel Zamora Perez	9 h 42 min 20 s
2014	(Spain) Marcel Zamora Perez	10 h 2 min 32 s
2015	(Croatia) Andrej Vištica	9 h 44 min 45 s
2016	(South Africa) James Cunnama	9 h 35 min 45 s
2017	(Spain) Marcel Zamora Perez	9 h 43 min 13 s
2018	(Belgium) Diego Van Looy	9 h 45 min 54 s
2019	(France) William Mennesson	9 h 48 min 6 s
2021	(France) Léon Chevalier	9 h 26 min 18 s

=== Female winners ===
Year	Winner	Time
1985	(France) Odile Lagarde	
1986	(France) Nadia Cédolin	
1987	(West Germany) Rita Keitmann	
1988	(France) Chantal Malherbe	
1989	(Netherlands) Marion Van Boven	
1990	(France) Dominique Damiani	13 h 33 min
1991	(France) Dominique Damiani	13 h 26 min
1992	(Australia) Tracey Ellingham	12 h 01 min
1993	(France) Anne Marie Rouchon	11 h 37 min
1994	(Australia) Gail Watson	12 h 27 min
1995	(Germany) Barbara Alber	12 h 25 min
1996	(Australia) Gail Watson	12 h 24 min
1997	(France) Catherine Houseaux	12 h 40 min
1998	(Germany) Barbara Alber	12 h 23 min
1999	(France) Pascale Lafosse	12 h 46 min
2000	(Netherlands) Bianca Van Djik	12 h 10 min
2001	(France) Isabelle Mouthon-Michellys	11 h 55 min
2002	(United Kingdom) Bella Bayliss Commerford	11 h 41 min
2003	(France) Catherine Houseaux	11 h 55 min
2004	(France) Estelle Patou	12 h 26 min
2005	(France) Estelle Leroi	12 h 17 min 25 s
2006	(France) Estelle Leroi	11 h 56 min 37s
2007	(France) Audrée Cléau	11 h 57 min 39s
2008	(United Kingdom) Bella Bayliss Commerford	11 h 26 min 06s
2009	(United Kingdom) Bella Bayliss Commerford	11 h 02 min 48s
2010	(Czech Republic) Teresa Macel	11 h 20 min 09s
2011	(Hungary) Erika Csomor	11 h 15 min 40s
2012	(France) Jeanne Collonge	11 h 07min 09s
2013	(France) Jeanne Collonge	10 h 56 min 43s
2014	(Republic of Ireland) Eimear Mullan	11 h 29 min 36 s
2015	(United Kingdom) Emma Pooley	10 h 57 min 56 s
2016	(Australia) Carrie Lester	10 h 46 min 26 s
2017	(Belgium) Tine Deckers	10 h 51min 14s
2018	(Australia) Carrie Lester	10 h 51 min 43 s
2019	(Spain) Judith Corachan Vaquera	10 h 54 min 7 s

== See also ==
- Triathlon
