= Amy Wheeler =

Feminist playwright and actor

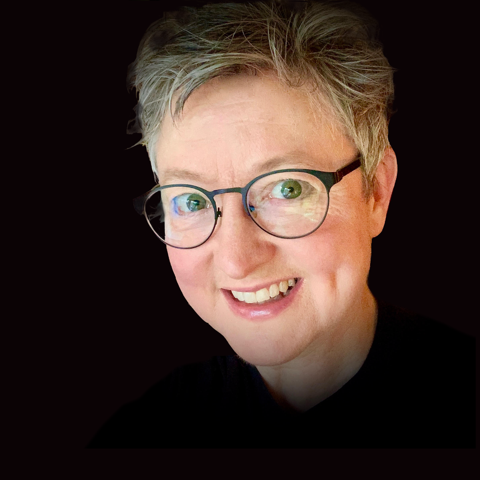
Amy Wheeler

Amy Wheeler is a playwright, educator, speaker, nonprofit consultant, and the former Executive Director of Hedgebrook, a nonprofit organization supporting a global community of women and non-binary writers authoring change on Whidbey Island, where she served for 13 years. Wheeler is a feminist, actor and an alumna of Hedgebrook and Yaddo.

As Executive Director of Hedgebrook, Wheeler founded the Creative Advisory Council with alumna Gloria Steinem.

Born and raised in Oklahoma, Wheeler is the daughter of Jim (a Methodist minister) and Jo Wheeler (an educator). She holds an Honorary Doctor of Fine Arts from Cornish College of the Arts, an MFA from the Iowa Playwrights Workshop and has taught playwriting at the University of Iowa, Cornish College of the Arts, Freehold Studio Theatre Lab, Richard Hugo House, and in ACT Theatre's Young Playwrights Program.

She lives in the Pacific Northwest with her wife and creative partner RK Buzard.

== Recognition ==
Amy was awarded the Seattle Arts & Lectures' Prowda Literary Champions Award (2020) for “demonstrating true commitment to the Pacific Northwest’s community of readers and writers.”

Amy was playwright-in-residence at Stark Raving Theatre from 2005 - 2007. She has received a New York Foundation for the Arts grant and an Artist Trust fellowship in Ireland. Her play "Wizzer Pizzer" was included in the 2012 Manifesto Series V.3: A THEATRE OF DEFIANCE
