= Paulo Gonçalves =

Paulo Gonçalves may refer to:

- Paulo Gonçalves (football manager) (born 1936), Brazilian football manager
- Paulo Gonçalves (motorcyclist) (1979–2020), Portuguese rally racing motorcycle rider
