= Patrick Girard =

French electrical engineer

Patrick Girard is an electrical engineer with the Laboratory of Informatics, Robotics, and Microelectronics of Montpellier (LIRMM) in Montpellier, France. Girard was named a Fellow of the Institute of Electrical and Electronics Engineers (IEEE) in 2015 for his contributions to power-aware testing of VLSI circuits.
