= Pedro Cordeiro =

Pedro Cordeiro is a masculine Portuguese name that may refer to:

- Pedro Cordeiro (fl. 1630), a Macanese soldier
- Pedro Cordeiro (b. 1963), a Portuguese tennis player
