= Normann Stadler =

German triathlete (born 1973)

Medal record

Representing Germany

Men's triathlon

Ironman World Championship
Gold medal – first place	2004	Elite
Gold medal – first place	2006	Elite
Bronze medal – third place	2000	Elite

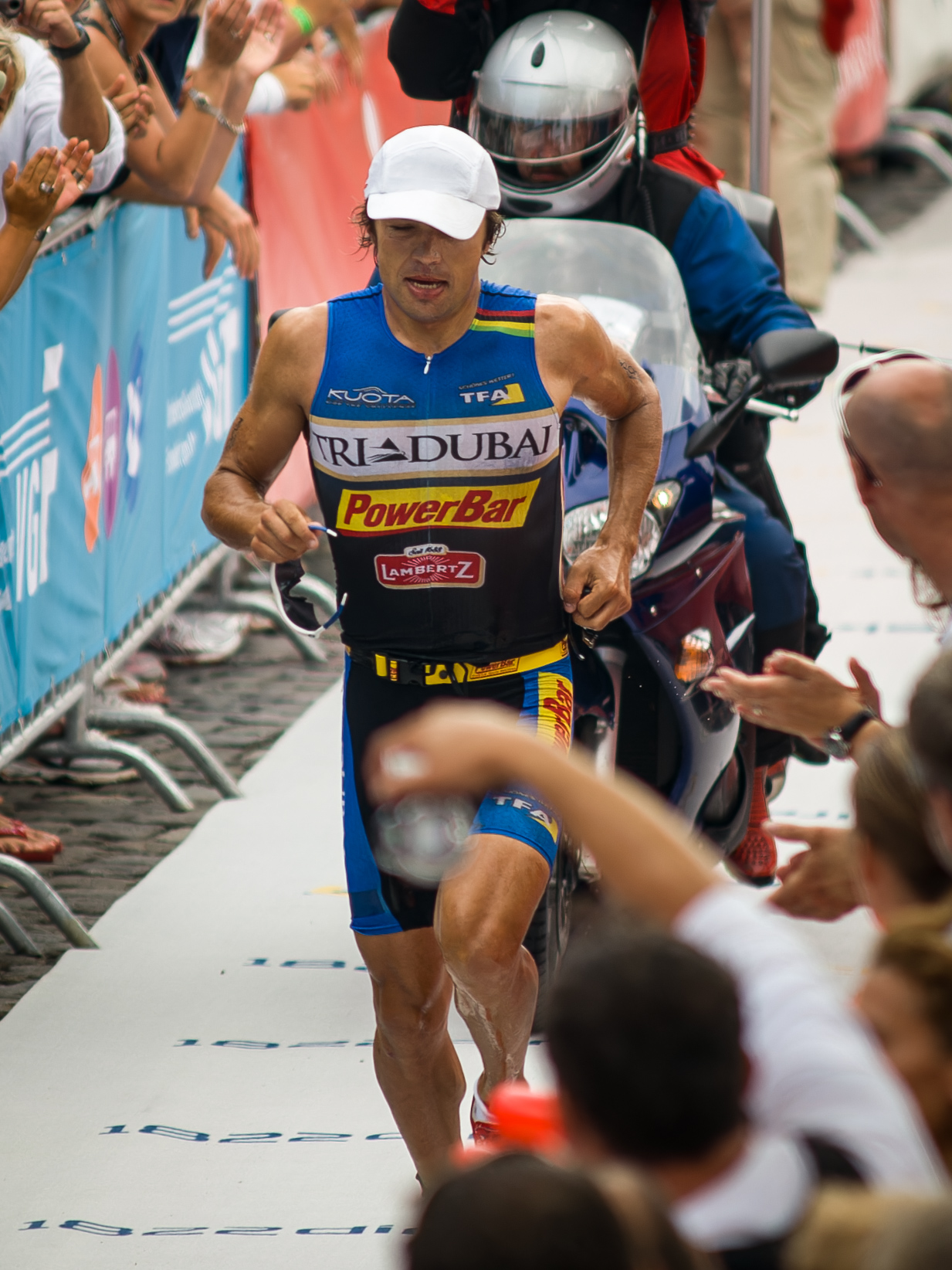
Normann Stadler at the 2006 Ironman European Championship in Frankfurt am Main (Germany).

Normann ("The Norminator") Stadler (born February 25, 1973, in Wertheim) is a retired professional triathlete from Germany. He is the winner of the 2004 and 2006 Ironman Triathlon World Championship in Hawaii.

Stadler was a member of the Tri Dubai triathlon team until it disbanded at the end of the 2006 triathlon season. Up until 2011, he was a member of the Commerzbank Triathlon Team.

== Career ==
Stadler ran his first marathon at 11 years old. Later, he became a triathlete and was a member of the German national team in 1988. He won a world duathlon title in 1994. He first competed at the Ironman World Championship in 1999 as an age-group athlete. He took third place in 2000, fourth place in 2001 and 2003, and then he won in 2004.

Following his 2004 Ironman World Championship, Stadler was expected to do well in the 2005 Ironman. However, he withdrew from the race after suffering three tire punctures and a bleeding bee sting on the thigh.

In 2006, Normann returned to Kona to compete in the Ironman World Championships. Stadler swam fast enough to exit the water only moments behind the race leaders. Once on the bike course, Stadler managed to gain over 10 minutes on the chase pack, setting a bike course record at 4:18:23 (26 mph). Australian Chris McCormack came within 71 seconds of Stadler but was unable to get any closer. Stadler received $110,000 for his win.

When racing in the 2007 World Championship, Stadler was forced to withdraw due to illness before the midpoint of the bike ride and was unable to defend the title.

On July 5, 2011, Stadler had a successful five-hour heart surgery in Heidelberg (Germany). Following the surgery, four weeks later, Stadler announced his retirement from professional triathlon racing.
