= Wolfgang Dittrich =

German triathlete

Wolfgang Dittrich (born 1962 in Neuss) is a German triathlete now living in the United States.

He won the German triathlon in 1987. He turned to triathlon after he failed to make the German Olympic team in swimming. He finished third at the Ironman Hawaii in 1993 (time 08:20:13).

In 1994 Dittrich hurt his knee at a bicycle accident and an infection of his knee followed. He started with triathlon again in 1996. He won the Steel Town Man in Linz, 1998. He is now the head coach of Flatiron Athletic Club, a competitive youth swim team in Boulder, Colorado.
