= 2010 ITU Duathlon World Championships =

The 2010 ITU Duathlon World Championships was a duathlon competition held in Edinburgh, Scotland from 3 to 5 September 2010 and organized by the International Triathlon Union (ITU). The championship course included a 10k run, a 38.4k bike, and a 5k run around the areas of Holyrood Park, Arthur’s Seat and the Scottish Parliament Building. General Electric was the title sponsor of the championship. Titles for amateur duathletes, elite paraduathletes, and elite duathletes were awarded during the three days of competition.

== Results ==
Scotland native Catriona Morrison captured the overall women's elite title, her second following her 2006 win. Bart Aernouts took the men's elite title, leading the Belgium sweep of the podium spots.

=== Men ===
==== Elite championship ====
Rank	Name	Run	Bike	Run	Time
Gold medal	Bart Aernouts (BEL)	30:15	1:03:50	15:43	1:50:22
Silver medal	Rob Woestenborghs (BEL)	30:17	1:03:53	15:44	1:50:23
Bronze medal	Joerie Vansteelant (BEL)	N/A	N/A	N/A	1:50:30
4	Victor Del Corral (ESP)	30:13	1:04:26	15:49	1:51:06
5	Sergio Silva (POR)	30:13	1:04:36	16:28	1:51:45
6	Damien Derobert (FRA)	30:16	1:06:31	15:44	1:52:58
7	Adam Bowden (GBR)	30:14	1:07:32	15:24	1:53:37
8	Sean Jefferson (USA)	30:15	1:07:34	15:31	1:53:54
9	Ramos Herrera (MEX)	30:16	1:07:15	16:13	1:54:13
10	Richard Hobby (GBR)	30:16	1:06:29	16:52	1:54:16

==== Under 23 elite ====
Rank	Name	Run	Bike	Run	Time
Gold medal	Etienne Diemunsch (FRA)	30:09	1:07:34	15:23	1:53:33
Silver medal	Matthew Gunby (GBR)	30:15	1:07:45	16:01	1:54:27
Bronze medal	Oscar Vicente (ESP)	30:15	1:07:39	17:37	1:56:01

=== Women ===
==== Elite championship ====
Rank	Name	Run	Bike	Run	Time
Gold medal	Catriona Morrison (GBR)	33:56	1:11:02	17:14	2:02:47
Silver medal	Sandra Levenez (FRA)	19:06	1:09:54	17:31	2:04:48
Bronze medal	Felicity Sheedy-Ryan (AUS)	33:56	1:15:09	16:36	2:06:14
4	Jenny Schulz (GER)	33:54	1:15:06	16:43	2:06:20
5	Ana Burgos (ESP)	33:54	1:15:04	17:05	2:06:42
6	Katie Hewison (GBR)	33:54	1:15:14	17:30	2:07:10
7	Andrea Steyn (RSA)	33:56	1:14:34	18:57	2:07:58
8	Ruth Van der Meijden (NED)	33:54	1:15:15	18:58	2:08:37
9	Stefanie Bouma (NED)	33:56	1:18:02	18:24	2:10:53
10	Inmaculada Pereiro (ESP)	33:47	1:17:09	18:30	2:10:59

==== Under 23 elite ====
Rank	Name	Run	Bike	Run	Time
Gold medal	Sophie Coleman (GBR)	35:37	1:20:00	18:52	2:15:02
Silver medal	Lois Rosindale (GBR)	35:26	1:19:09	20:52	2:15:56
Bronze medal	Alice Capone (ITA)	36:34	1:24:28	19:05	2:20:41
