= 2011 ITU Duathlon World Championships =

The 2011 ITU Duathlon World Championships was a duathlon competition held in Gijón, Spain from 24 to 25 September 2011 and organized by the International Triathlon Union (ITU). The championship course included a 10k run, a 38.4k bike, and a 5k run. Titles for amateur duathletes, elite paraduathletes, and elite duathletes were awarded during the two days of competition.

== Schedule ==
24 September

- 8:30 Junior Women
- 9:50 Junior Men
- 11:45 Elite and U23 Women
- 14:45 Elite and U23 Men
- 17:45 Paraduathlon

25 September

- 08:30 Age Group Sprint Distance
- 10:00 Age Group Olympic Distance
- 11:00 Paraduathlon Medals Ceremony
- 15:00 Elite Mixed Team Relay
- 15:03 Junior Mixed Team Relay
- 20:00 Closing Ceremony

== Results ==
Katie Hewison, of Great Britain won her first world championship, winning the women's elite division. Sergio Silva won the men's title despite falling behind the leaders during the bike leg. However, Silva charged through the field during the last run segment to claim the win.

=== Men ===
Rank	Name	Run	Bike	Run	Time
Elite
Gold medal	Roger Roca Dalmau (ESP)	30:54	1:03:11	16:13	1:51:22
Silver medal	Victor del Corral (ESP)	30:52	1:04:22	15:17	1:51:29
Bronze medal	Benoit Nicolas (FRA)	30:51	1:04:27	15:17	1:51:30
Under 23 elite
Gold medal	Etienne Diemunsch (FRA)	30:51	1:03:09	15:45	1:50:36
Silver medal	Matthew Gunby (GBR)	30:52	1:04:28	15:28	1:51:40
Bronze medal	Miguel Arraiolos (POR)	30:54	1:04:23	15:44	1:51:51
Junior
Gold medal	Matthias Steinwandter (ITA)	15:34	32:27	7:40	56:31
Silver medal	David Mendoza (MEX)	15:35	32:31	7:39	56:36
Bronze medal	David Castro Fajardo (ESP)	15:36	32:28	7:33	56:36

Sergio Silva had won the elite men's race but was stripped of his title after testing positive for methylhexaneamine. The positive test resulted in a six-month ban for Silva, instead of the standard two-year suspension, as Silva was able to convince the ITU that he took the substance inadvertently.

=== Women ===
Rank	Name	Run	Bike	Run	Time
Elite
Gold medal	Katie Hewison (GBR)	34:38	1:10:22	16:48	2:02:45
Silver medal	Jenny Schulz (GER)	34:38	1:10:25	16:49	2:02:47
Bronze medal	Sandra Levenez (FRA)	34:37	1:10:25	16:56	2:02:54
U23 Elite
Gold medal	Alexandra Cassan-Ferrier (FRA)	35:45	1:09:38	19:17	2:05:43
Silver medal	Sofie Hooghe (BEL)	36:46	1:11:42	19:53	2:09:24
Bronze medal	Arina Shulgina (RUS)	37:56	1:15:25	19:01	2:13:32
Junior
Gold medal	Joselin Brea (VEN)	18:11	35:48	8:12	1:03:12
Silver medal	Elena Maria Petrini (ITA)	18:40	35:02	8:39	1:03:37
Bronze medal	Melina Alonso (ESP)	18:41	35:19	8:53	1:03:51

=== 4x4 Mixed relay ===
Rank	Name	Leg1	Leg2	Leg3	Leg4	Time
Elite
Gold medal	France	21:50	20:22	23:15	20:38	1:26:07
Silver medal	Great Britain	21:50	20:16	23:42	21:07	1:26:56
Bronze medal	Spain	23:33	20:36	22:56	21:19	1:28:23
Junior
Gold medal	Italy	23:18	21:26	23:49	21:12	1:29:47
Silver medal	Spain	23:41	21:29	23:53	21:36	1:30:39
Bronze medal	South Africa	26:54	22:05	27:29	22:22	1:38:53
