= World Triathlon Long Distance Duathlon Championships =

World championship

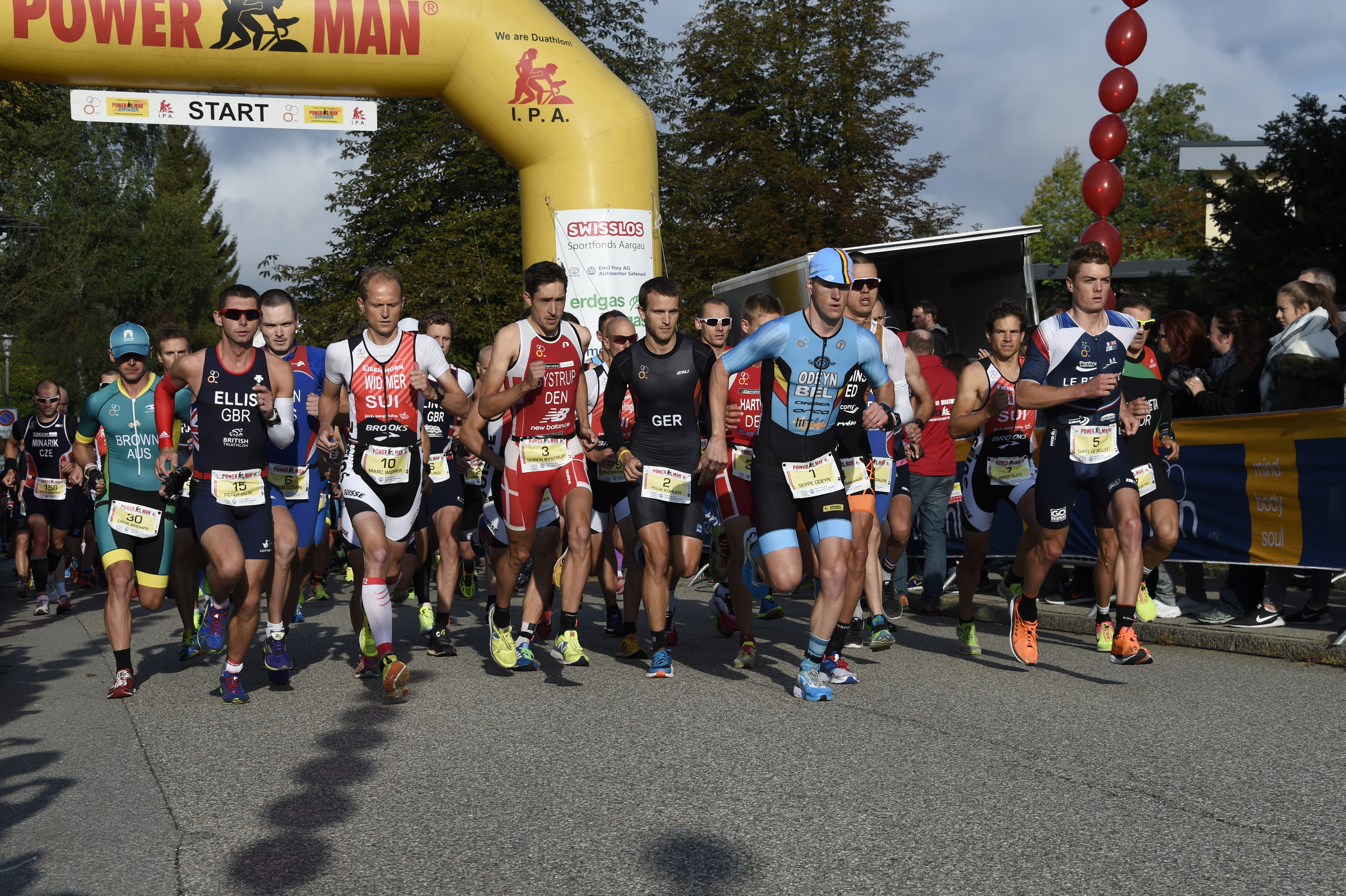
Powerman World Championships 2017 Men's Start

The ITU Long Distance Duathlon World Championships is a long-distance duathlon race, held annually since 1997, except for a break in 2009 and 2010. The championships involve a continuous run-cycle-run. The distances are typically around two to three times those of the shorter ITU Duathlon World Championships, in both cases varying according to the venue; they have also varied over the years. The championships are organised by the International Triathlon Union (ITU).

For its first three years (1997–1999) and also since 2011, the championships have been held jointly with the International Powerman Association (IPA) at Zofingen, Switzerland. The Zofingen event, known as Powerman Zofingen, claims to be "The most famous and toughest duathlon in the world", and is the longest course over which the championships have been held. The event is also the final of the Powerman Duathlon World Series.

== Venues ==
Year	Date	Location	Race distances (km)		
Year	Date	Location	Run 1	Cycle	Run 2
1997	1 June	Zofingen	8.5	150	30
1998	7 June	Zofingen	8.5	150	30
1999		Zofingen	8.5	150	30
2000		Pretoria	10	60	10
2001	8 September	Venray	15	60	7.5
2002		Weyer	14	76	7
2003		Zofingen	8.5	150	30
2004		Fredericia	20	120	10
2005	29 May	Barcis	16.5	80	11
2006	28 May	Fredericia	15	90	7.5
2007	21 October	Richmond	15	80	7.5
2008	10 August	Geel	18	74	9
2009					
2010					
2011	4 September	Zofingen	10	150	30
2012	2 September	Zofingen	10	150	30
2013	8 September	Zofingen	10	150	30
2014	7 September	Zofingen	10	150	30
2015	6 September	Zofingen	10	150	30
2016	4 September	Zofingen	10	150	30
2017	3 September	Zofingen	10	150	30
2018	2 September	Zofingen	10	150	30
2019	8 September	Zofingen	10	145	30
2021	19 September	Zofingen	9.2	144	25.5
2022	4 September	Zofingen	9.6	144	30
2023	3 September	Zofingen	10.51	147.3	27
2024	8 September	Zofingen	10	150	30
2025	7 September	Zofingen	10.8	148.2	26.72
2026	6 September	Zofingen	10.8	148.2	26.72

== Winners ==
Year	Male	Female	Ref
1997	Urs Dellsperger (SUI)	Natascha Badmann (SUI)	
1998	Olivier Bernhard (SUI)	Lori Bowden (CAN)	
1999	Olivier Bernhard (SUI)	Debbie Nelson (NZL)	
2000	Benny Vansteelant (BEL)	Edwige Pitel (FRA)	
2001	Benny Vansteelant (BEL)	Karin Thürig (SUI)	
2002	Huub Maas (NED)	Karin Thürig (SUI)	
2003	Stefan Riesen (SUI)	Fiona Docherty (NZL)	
2004	Greg Watson (USA)	Ulrike Schwalbe (GER)	
2005	Benny Vansteelant (BEL)	Erika Csomor (HUN)	
2006	Benny Vansteelant (BEL)	Yvonne van Vlerken (NED)	
2007	Joerie Vansteelant (BEL)	Catriona Morrison (GBR)	
2008	Joerie Vansteelant (BEL)	Catriona Morrison (GBR)	
2009	not held		
2010	not held		
2011	Joerie Vansteelant (BEL)	Melanie Burke (NZL)	
2012	Joerie Vansteelant (BEL)	Eva Nystrom (SWE)	
2013	Rob Woestenborghs (BEL)	Eva Nystrom (SWE)	
2014	Gaël Le Bellec (FRA)	Emma Pooley (GBR)	
2015	Gaël Le Bellec (FRA)	Emma Pooley (GBR)	
2016	Seppe Odeyn (BEL)	Emma Pooley (GBR)	
2017	Maxim Kuzmin (RUS)	Emma Pooley (GBR)	
2018	Gaël Le Bellec (FRA)	Petra Eggenschwiler (SUI)	
2019	Diego Van Looy (BEL)	Nina Zoller (SUI)	
2021	Seppe Odeyn (BEL)	Merle Brunnée (GER)	
2022	Matthieu Bourgeois (FRA)	Melanie Maurer (SUI)	
2023	Simon Jørn Hansen (DEN)	Merle Brunnée (GER)	
2024	Émile Blondel-Hermant (FRA)	Merle Brunnée (GER)	
2025	Baptiste Domanico (FRA)	Merle Brunnée (GER)	
2026	Émile Blondel-Hermant (FRA)	Merle Brunnée (GER)	
