= Maddy Tormoen =

American duathlete

Personal information
- National team: USA
- Born: December 29, 1961 (age 64) Cook County, Illinois (U.S.)

Sport
- Country: USA
- Sport: Duathlon
- Retired: 1995

Achievements and titles
- World finals: 2 × ITU World Champion, Long-Distance Duathlon (1993, 1995); 3rd place ITU World Championship, Team Short-Distance Duathlon (1993); 2nd place ITU World Championship Long-Distance Duathlon (1994)
- Highest world ranking: 1

Maddy Tormoen (born December 29, 1961) is an American duathlete and two-time world champion in long-distance duathlon. She was one of the leading competitors in the sport during the 1990s. Tormoen began running competitively in 1987, and in 1988 she qualified for the Olympic trials marathon. In 1990 she moved on to duathlon and quickly rose through the ranks.

Tormoen won the women's title at the Powerman Zofingen long-distance duathlon in 1993. Powerman Zofingen, held annually in Switzerland, is widely regarded as one of the most prestigious events in long-distance duathlon. The following year (1994) she was runner-up in the world long-distance championship and won seven of eight events in the Powerman Duathlon Series. In 1995 she won the Zofingen title for the second time. With the prize money of $50,000 USD, she secured the highest sum distributed to that date. During the peak of her career, she was considered one of the top female duathletes in the world.

Tormoen specialized in duathlon (run–bike–run) rather than triathlon. Unlike almost all of her fellow competitors, Tormoen never competed in triathlon during her career, as she described herself as a weak swimmer. She retired from elite competition in the mid-1990s. In 2003, she collapsed while competing in the Pikes Peak Marathon, suffering from ventricular tachycardia, a fast, uncontrolled beating of the heart. She declined medical attention and continued the race.

Tormoen lives in Colorado Springs, Colorado.

== Sporting success ==
Duathlon

Date/Year	Rank	Competition	Venue	Time	Note
1995	1	ITU Long Distance Duathlon World Championships	Switzerland Zofingen	07:42:43	As part of the Powerman Zofingen (13.5 km run, 150 km bike, 30 km run)
19 November 1994	3 (team), 5 (ind.)	Hobart ITU Duathlon World Championships	Australia Hobart	02:08:14	(10 km run, 40 km bike, 5 km run) Women elite team event with Ann Von Kerschberg and Wendy Becker
2 October 1994	1	Powerman Germany	Germany Spalt		20 km run, 117 km bike, 10 km run
1994	2	ITU Long Distance Duathlon World Championships	Switzerland Zofingen	07:17:15	7.5 km run, 150 km bike, 30 km run
1994	1	Powerman Chicago	United States Chicago		
17 October 1993	3	Dallas ITU Duathlon World Championships	United States Dallas	01:40:42	5 km run, 30 km bike, 5 km run
1993	1	ITU Long Distance Duathlon World Championships	Switzerland Zofingen	07:14:49	69 seconds ahead of fellow American Donna Peters
1993	1	Powerman Kauai	United States Kauai		Winner next to Kenny Souza among the men
30 November 1991	5	Cathedral City ITU Duathlon World Championships	United States Cathedral City	03:27:27	
1991	7	ITU Long Distance Duathlon World Championships	Switzerland Zofingen		
