= World Triathlon Duathlon Championships =

World championship

The World Triathlon Duathlon Championships is a duathlon championship competition organised by World Triathlon. The race has been held annually since 1990. The championships involve a continuous run-cycle-run, with the format since 1994 being a first run of 10 km, a cycle of 40 km and a second run of 5 km (distances varied prior to 1994).

== Venues ==
Year	Date	Location	Race distances (kilometres)		
Year	Date	Location	Run 1	Cycle	Run 2
1990	24 November	Cathedral City, California, United States	10	60	10
1991	30 November	Cathedral City, California, United States	10	60	10
1992	7 June	Frankfurt, Germany	10	60	10
1993	17 October	Arlington, Texas, United States	5	50	5
1994	19 November	Hobart, Australia	10	40	5
1995	3 November	Cancún, Mexico	10	40	5
1996	14–15 September	Ferrara, Italy	10	40	5
1997	13 September	Guernica, Spain	10	40	5
1998	23 August	St. Wendel, Germany	10	40	5
1999	17 October	Huntersville, North Carolina, United States	10	40	5
2000	8 October	Calais, France	10	40	5
2001	11 September	Rimini, Italy	10	40	5
2002	20 October	Alpharetta, Georgia, United States	10	40	5
2003	31 August	Affoltern, Switzerland	10	40	5
2004	30 May	Geel, Belgium	10	40	5
2005	25 September	Newcastle, NSW, Australia	10	40	5
2006	29 July	Corner Brook, Canada	10	40	5
2007	19 May	Győr, Hungary	10	40	5
2008	27 September	Rimini, Italy	10	40	5
2009	26 September	Concord, North Carolina, United States	10	40	5
2010	3–5 September	Edinburgh, United Kingdom	10	38.4	5
2011	24–25 September	Gijón, Spain	10	40	5
2012	22–23 September	Nancy, France	10	40	5
2013*	26–27 July	Cali, Colombia & Ottawa, Canada	10	37	5
2014	31 May–1 June	Pontevedra, Spain	10	40	5
2015	14–18 October	Adelaide, Australia	10	40	5
2016	04–5 June	Avilés, Spain	10	40	5
2017	19 August	Penticton	10	40.5	5
2018	6 July	Fyn, Denmark	10	40	5
2019	27 April	Pontevedra, Spain	10	40	5
2021	6–7 November	Avilés, Spain	10	40	5
2022	10 June	Târgu Mureș, Romania	10	37.5	5
2023	29 April	Santa Eulària, Spain	5	20	2.5
2024	16 August	Townsville, Australia	4.79	19.4	2.5
2025	21 June	Pontevedra, Spain	5	30	5
2026	14 November	Abu Dhabi, United Arab Emirates	5.1	29.5	5.1

*The ITU Duathlon World Championships for Under23, Junior, Paraduathlon and Age-Group athletes took place in Ottawa, Canada, while Elite level competition occurred at the World Games 2013.

== Champions ==
=== Elite ===
Year	Male	Female	Reference
1990	Kenny Souza (USA)	Thea Sybesma (NED)	
1991	Matt Brick (NZL)	Erin Baker (NZL)	
1992	Matt Brick (NZL)	Jenny Alcorn (AUS)	
1993	Greg Welch (AUS)	Carol Montgomery (CAN)	
1994	Normann Stadler (GER)	Irma Heeren (NED)	
1995	Oscar Galíndez (ARG)	Natascha Badmann (SUI)	
1996	Andrew Noble (AUS)	Jackie Gallagher (AUS)	
1997	Jonathan Hall (AUS)	Irma Heeren (NED)	
1998	Yann Millon (FRA)	Irma Heeren (NED)	
1999	Yann Millon (FRA)	Jackie Gallagher (AUS)	
2000	Benny Vansteelant (BEL)	Stephanie Forrester (GBR)	
2001	Benny Vansteelant (BEL)	Erika Csomor (HUN)	
2002	Tim Don (GBR)	Corine Raux (FRA)	
2003	Benny Vansteelant (BEL)	Edwige Pitel (FRA)	
2004	Benny Vansteelant (BEL)	Erika Csomor (HUN)	
2005	Paul Amey (GBR)	Michelle Dillon (GBR)	
2006	Leon Griffin (AUS)	Catriona Morrison (GBR)	
2007	Paul Amey (GBR)	Vanessa Fernandes (POR)	
2008	Rob Woestenborghs (BEL)	Vanessa Fernandes (POR)	
2009	Jarrod Shoemaker (USA)	Vendula Frintová (CZE)	
2010	Bart Aernouts (BEL)	Catriona Morrison (GBR)	
2011	Roger Roca (ESP)	Katie Hewison (GBR)	
2012	Emilio Martín (ESP)	Felicity Sheedy-Ryan (AUS)	
2013	Rob Woestenborghs (BEL)	Ai Ueda (JPN)	
2014	Benoît Nicolas (FRA)	Sandra Lévénez (FRA)	
2015	Emilio Martín (ESP)	Emma Pallant (GBR)	
2016	Richard Murray (RSA)	Emma Pallant (GBR)	
2017	Benoît Nicolas (FRA)	Felicity Sheedy-Ryan (AUS)	
2018	Andreas Schilling (DEN)	Sandrina Illes (AUT)	
2019	Benjamin Choquert (FRA)	Sandra Lévénez (FRA)	
2021	Nathan Guerbeur (FRA)	Joselyn Brea (VEN)	
2022	Krilan le Bihan (FRA)	Joselyn Brea (VEN)	
2023	Mario Mola (ESP)	Emma Pallant (GBR)	
2024	Javier Martín (ESP)	Marion Legrand (FRA)	
2025	Benjamin Choquert (FRA)	Giorgia Priarone (ITA)	
2026	Davide Menichelli (ITA)	Lisa Tertsch (GER)	
