= Jenny Alcorn =

Jenny Alcorn (1959-3 March 2025) was an Australian triathlete and coach.

She is best known for winning the World Triathlon Duathlon Championships in 1992. She was the first Australian woman to win the event and is one of only three Australian women to have won the event, the others being Jackie Fairweather and Felicity Sheedy-Ryan.

In 2006, Alcorn trained a three-man triathlon team from the Solomon Islands prior to the team competing in the 2006 Commonwealth Games in Melbourne. Alcorn served as the head coach of the Surfers Paradise Triathlon for over 30 years, training athletes such as Emma Snowsill and Ashleigh Gentle.

In 2016, she came out of retirement at the age of 55 to compete in the 2016 Ironman World Championship in Kailua-Kona, Hawaii, winning the 55 to 59 age group. She then competed in and won the World Triathlon Cross Championships in the Snowy Mountains in November 2016.

In 2018, Alcorn was selected as the flag bearer for the Australian team at the Age Group World Championships on the Gold Coast.

In 2021, AusTriathlon named Alcorn as a “Legend of the Sport”. She was also recognised at the 2024 AusTriathlon Awards with a President’s Special Recognition Award. She was also nominated for the Daphne Pirie Spirit of Sport Award in 2024.

In 2024, she revealed she had been diagnosed with Glioblastoma. Alcorn died on 3 March 2025.
