= Upegui =

Upegui is a surname. Notable people with the surname include:

- Carolina Upegui (born 1989), Colombian racing cyclist
- Óscar Upegui (born 1969), Colombian footballer
