= Stephanie Forrester =

Stephanie Forrester may refer to:

- Stephanie Forrester (triathlete) (born 1969), British triathlete
- Stephanie Forrester (The Bold and the Beautiful), a fictional character in the U.S. TV soap opera The Bold and the Beautiful
