= Melanie Maurer =

Swiss cyclist (born 1988)

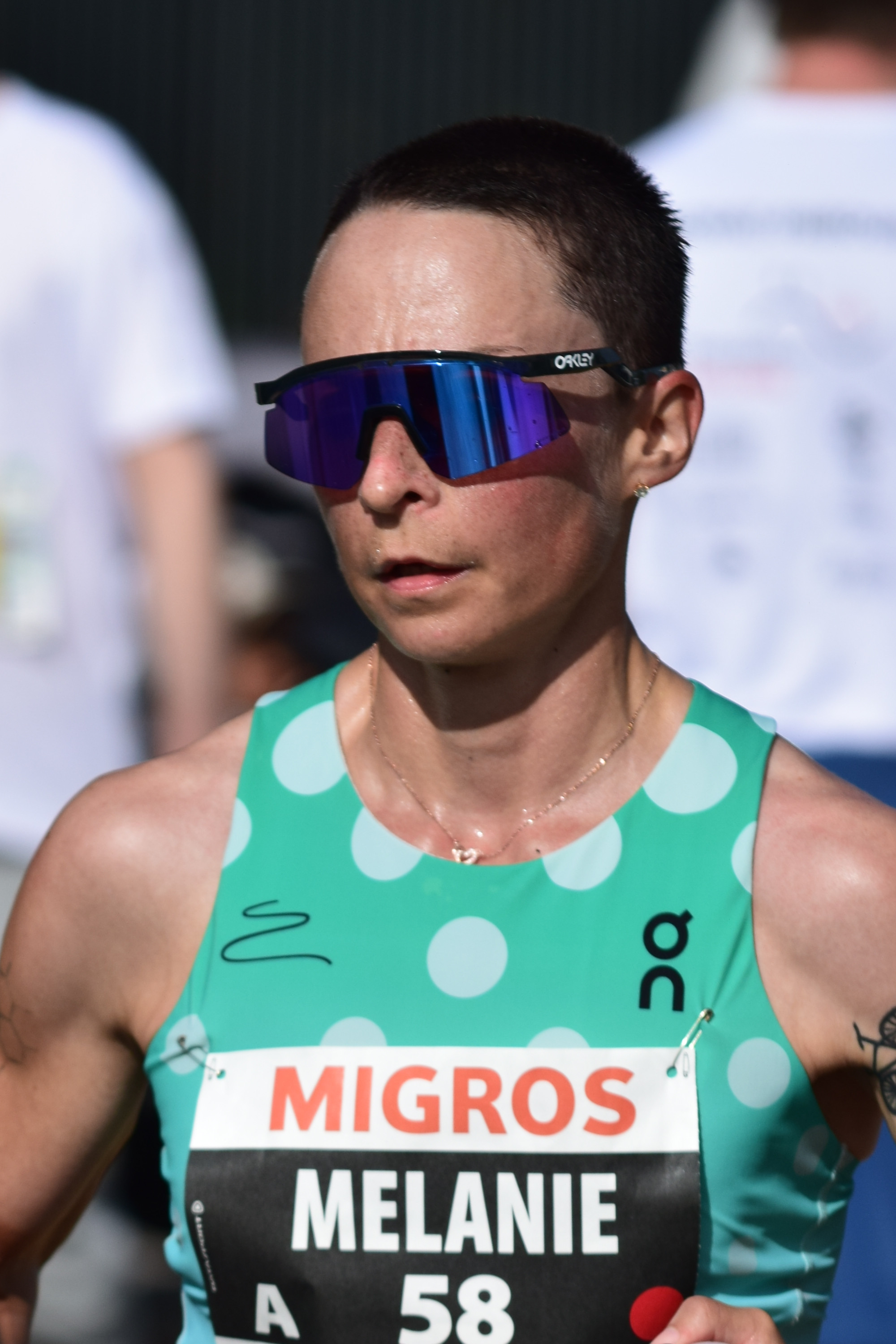
- Melanie Maurer in 2023

Personal information
- Full name: Melanie Maurer
- Born: 17 June 1988 (age 38) Wikon, Switzerland

Cycling career
- Sport: Cycling
- Current team: Mayenne Monbana My Pie
- Discipline: Road
- Role: Rider

Amateur team
- 2020: Ciclo International Ostermundigen

Professional team
- 2021: Stade Rochelais Charente-Maritime

Melanie Maurer (born 17 June 1988) is a Swiss professional racing cyclist, and duathlete, who last rode for UCI Women's Continental Team Stade Rochelais Charente-Maritime. She rode in the women's road race event at the 2020 UCI Road World Championships. In 2022, Maurer won the World Triathlon Long Distance Duathlon Championships, after finishing second in both the 2018 and 2019 editions.

== Personal life ==
Outside of sport, Maurer works as a sports therapist.
