= Triathlon Australia =

AusTriathlon
- Sport: Triathlon
- Jurisdiction: National
- Abbreviation: AT or TA (former)
- Founded: 1984
- Affiliation: World Triathlon (WT)
- Regional affiliation: Oceania Triathlon Union
- Headquarters: Milton, Queensland
- Location: Australia
- President: Michelle Cooper
- CEO: Tim Harradine

Official website
- www.triathlon.org.au
- (Australia)

AusTriathlon (formerly Triathlon Australia) is the governing body responsible for the management of sports such as duathlon, aquathlon and triathlon within Australia.

== History ==
Triathlon came to Australia in the early 1980s but the first state Associations arrived 4 year later. In 1986, the Triathlon Federation of Australia (what is now known as Triathlon Australia) was founded with the support of Dr. Jim Hazel from Sydney and Geoff Frost from Melbourne. In 1991, the name was changed to what is now known as Triathlon Australia.

In 1989, the first International Triathlon Union's Triathlon World Championships was (or ITU for short) held there in Australia. The distances for the short course triathlon was also selected that year. The distances for the short distance are (1.5 km swim 40 km cycle and 10 km run.)

=== Success ===
- In 1990, just one year after the first World Triathlon Series, Greg Welch (born 1964) had won the Elite Male World Championship for Triathlon in Florida. The race was also called the Grand Slam
- Just following Greg Welch's success came Miles Stewart's success the following year again in the ITU. He had won gold and just 2 seconds faster than Rick Wells, another Australian Triathlete.
- Australia's first women success came again 1 year after in the women race. During the 1992 ITU Triathlon World Championships, Michellie Jones had won gold. She won gold again one year later in 1993.

As of March 2014, Australia is the current leading nation in the sport of Triathlon. The nation currently has 19 senior World Champion Titles.

In September 2023, Triathlon Australia rebranded as AusTriathlon, announced as a renewed focus on growing and celebrating triathlon in Australia.

== State and Territory Triathlon Associations (STTA) ==
The national body has eight state and territory triathlon associations which act as voting members.

As of 2022, five of the eight STTA's adopted the national bodies Future Operating Model, which serves to bring the operation of all entities closer together under a shared operational model. These five states are Queensland, Victoria, South Australia, Tasmania and Northern Territory. Western Australia, New South Wales and Australian Capital Territory remain actively engaged with the aim to continue their close working association with the national and state bodies.

== See also ==
- Miles Stewart
- Jackie Fairweather
- Loretta Harrop
- Michellie Jones
- Brad Beven
- Greg Welch
- ITU Triathlon World Championships
