= Kenny Souza =

American duathlete

Kenny Souza is an American duathlete.

== Career ==
Born in 1964 or 1965 and raised in Hacienda Heights, California, Kenny Souza began his sporting career as a triathlete before moving to the duathlon. During the 1980s and 1990s he was US duathlon champion eight times, world duathlon champion once, and also, because of his photogenic appearance, the most prominent athlete in the sport.

His greatest successes came in 1990, when he won the first ITU Duathlon World Championship and also won the Powerman Zofingen. In 1999 he withdrew from competition after receiving a three-year suspension, retroactive to 1998, for starting without a valid license. In the following years he worked as a representative of the sports nutrition manufacturer Clif Bar. Souza returned to the duathlon in 2005 and since then has participated in several long-haul and ultra-long-distance racing events, such as the 2006 Race Across America.
