= Arina Shulgina =

Russian triathlete

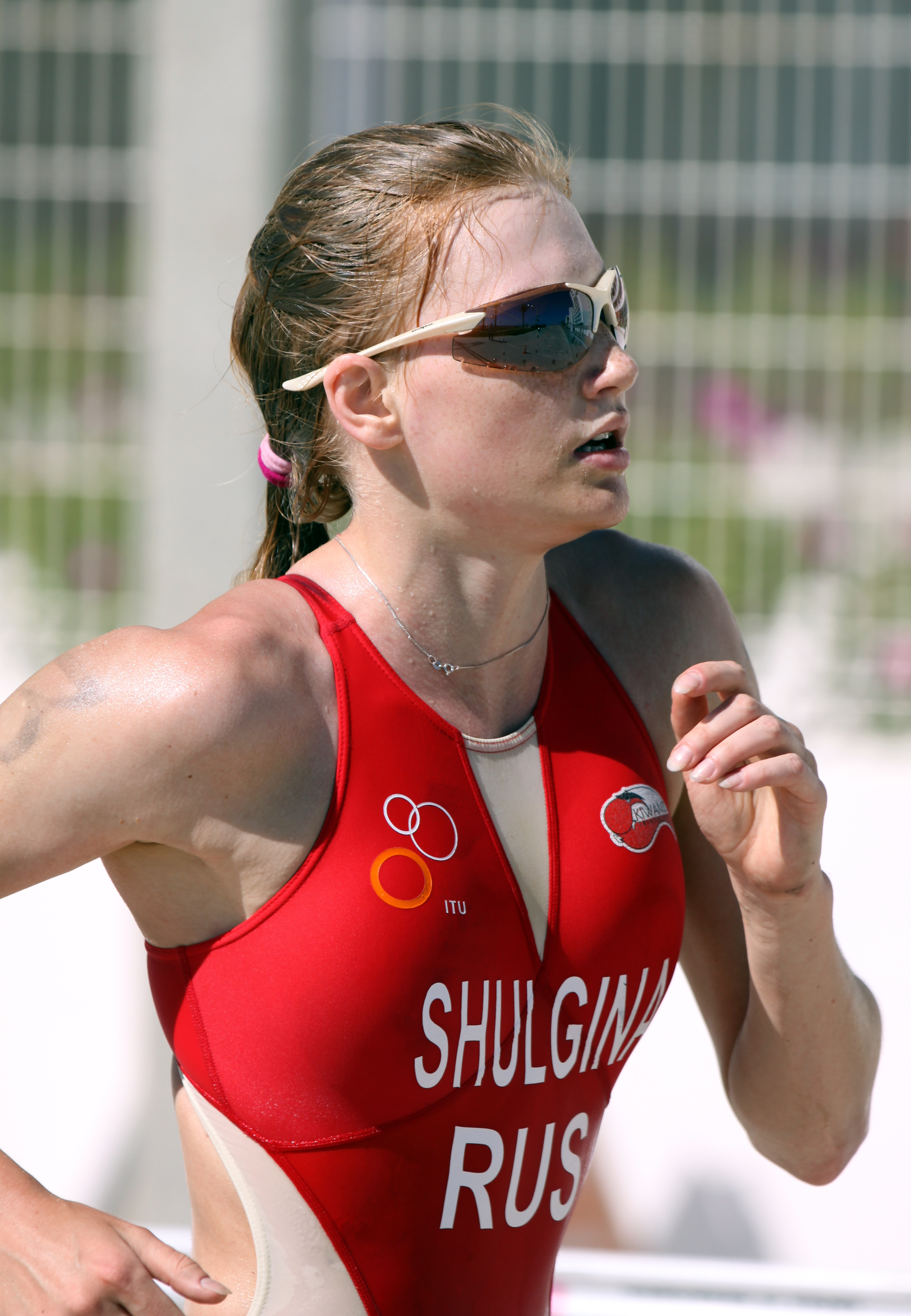
- Arina Shulgina at the European Cup triathlon in Quarteira, 2011

Personal information
- Nationality: Russian
- Born: 25 June 1991 (age 35)

Sport
- Country: Russia
- Sport: Triathlon

Arina Shulgina (Russian Арина Владимировна Шульгина, patronymic: Vladimirovna), born 25 June 1991, is a Russian professional triathlete. She is the winner of the sprint triathlon at the 2010 Russian Championships 2010 in Penza, and a reserve member of the Russian National Team.

== Athletic career ==
At the Russian Championships 2010, Shulgina won the gold medals in the Junior/U23 category (юниорки) on the sprint distances. In 2010, Shulgina was number 3 in the Russian U23 (Юниорки) ranking, and number 5 in the U23 Russian Cup ranking.

In March 2011 Shulgina placed 7th at the Russian Elite Aquathlon Championships, in April 2011 she was awarded the title Master of Sport (Мастер спорта России).

Shulgina attends the Sports Elite School КОР No. 1 in Moscow. In France, Shulgina represents Issy Triathlon, in the 2011 D1 Duathlon Club Championship Series.

=== ITU results ===
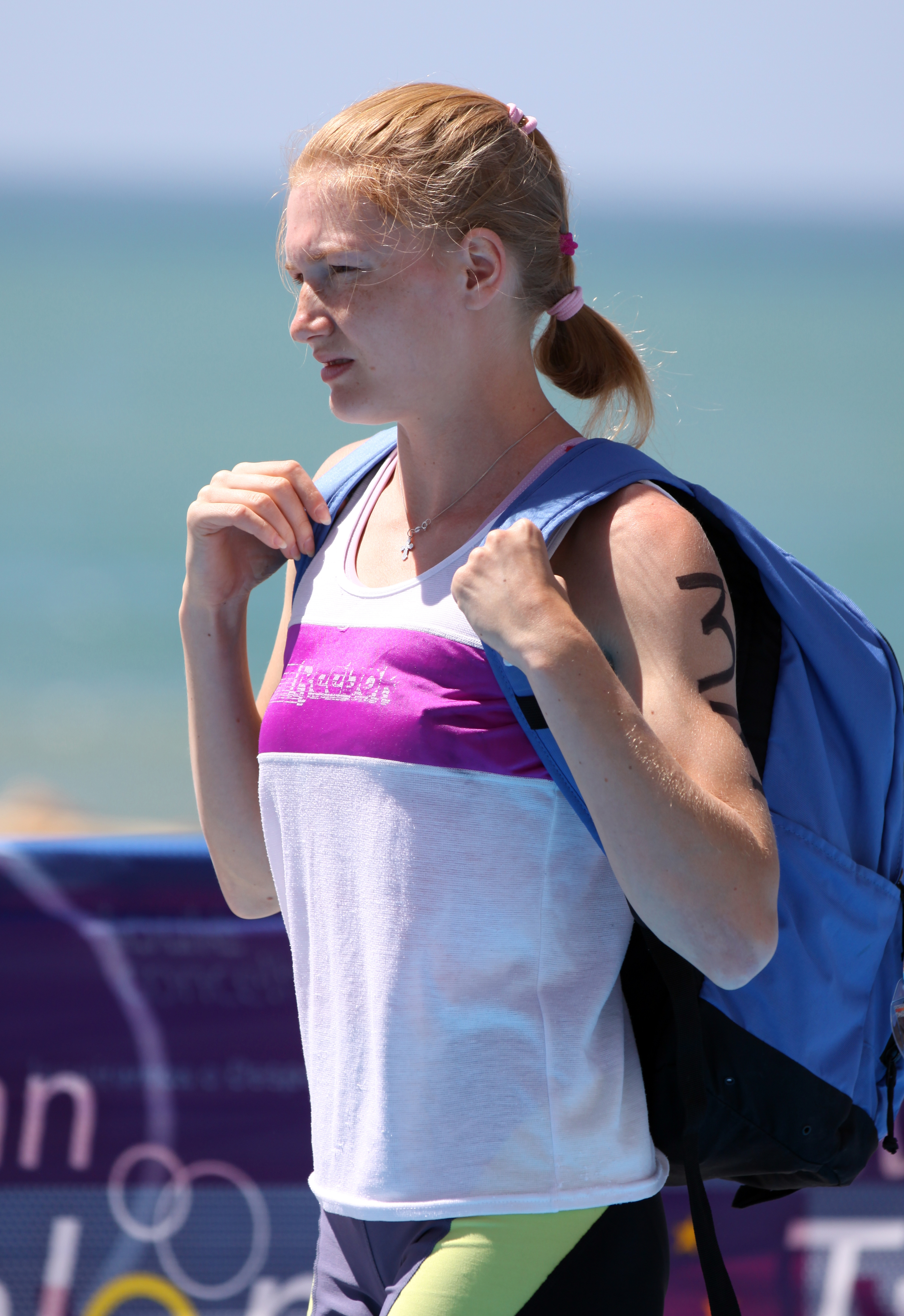
Arina Shulgina ckecking in at the European Cup triathlon in Quarteira, 2011

From 2007 to 2010, Shulgina took part in 8 ITU competitions, from 2009 on she has also taken part in elite events. Unless indicated otherwise, the following events are triathlons (Olympic Distance) and refer to the Elite category.

| Date | Competition | Place | Rank |
|---|---|---|---|
| 2007-10-24 | European Cup (Junior) | Alanya | 12 |
| 2008-10-26 | European Cup (Junior) | Alanya | 2 |
| 2009-09-09 | World Championship Series, Grand Final: Junior World Championships | Gold Coast | 25 |
| 2009-10-25 | Premium European Cup | Alanya | 27 |
| 2010-07-03 | European Championships (Junior) | Athlone | 24 |
| 2010-08-08 | World Cup | Tiszaújváros | 54 |
| 2010-09-08 | World Championship Series, Grand Final: Junior World Championships | Budapest | 49 |
| 2010-10-24 | Premium European Cup | Alanya | 23 |
| 2011-04-09 | European Cup | Quarteira | 29 |
| 2011-07-03 | European Cup | Penza | 12 |
| 2011-08-14 | World Cup | Tiszaújváros | 51 |

DNF = Did not finish
DNS = Did not start

== Gallery ==
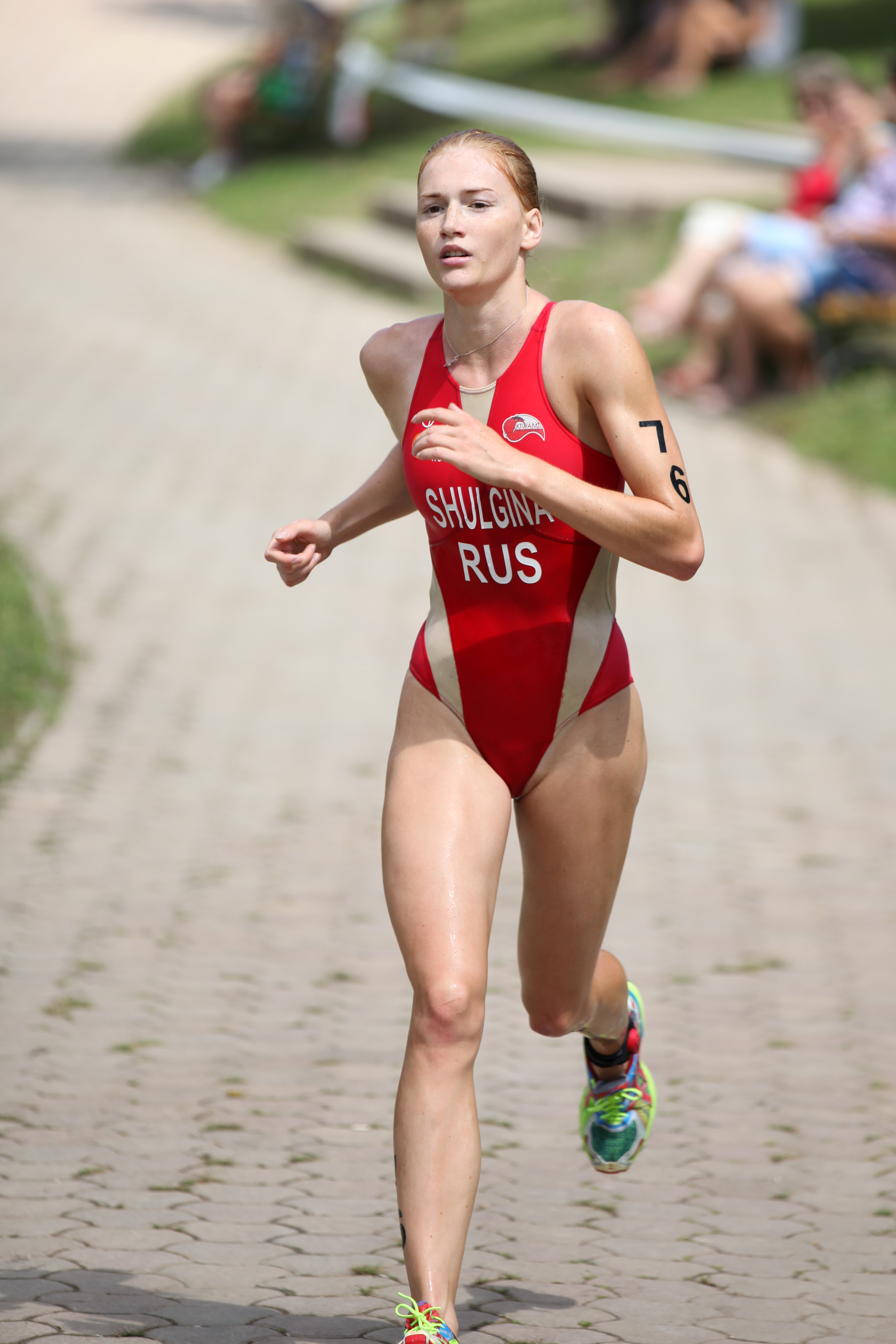
Arina Shulgina at the World Cup triathlon in Tiszaújváros, 2011

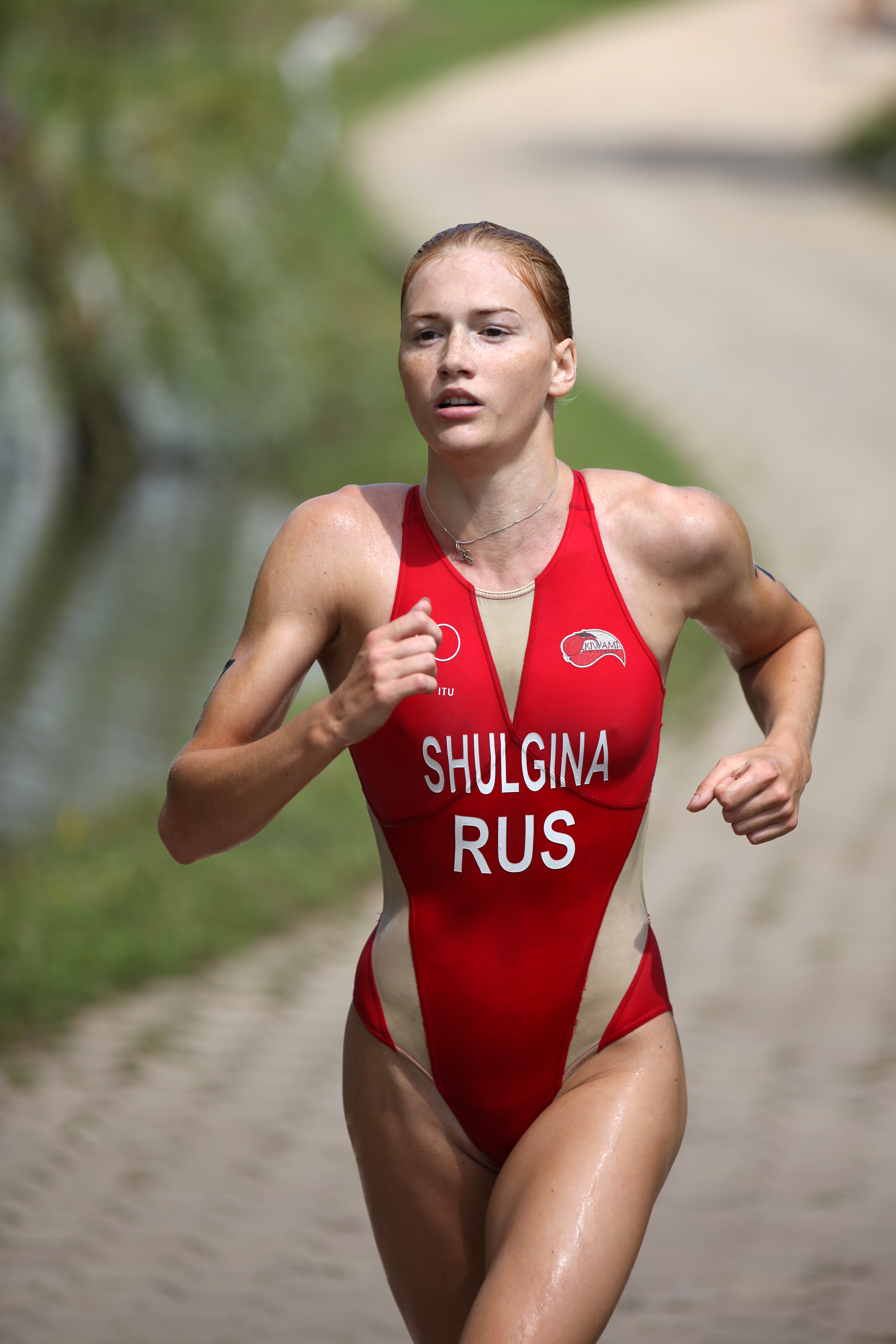
Arina Shulgina at the World Cup triathlon in Tiszaújváros, 2011
