= Martine Gjøs =

Norwegian cyclist

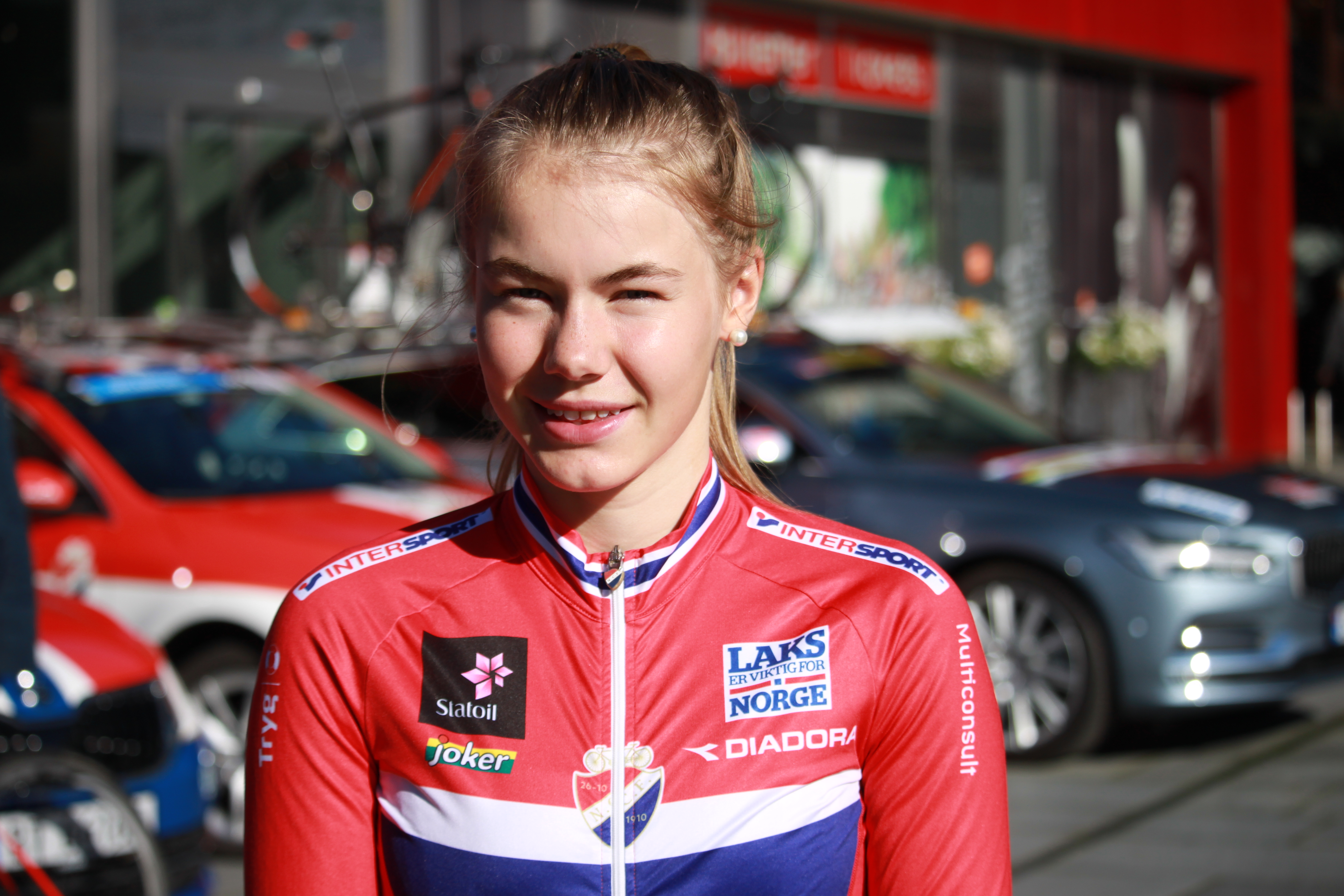
- Gjøs in 2017

Personal information
- Born: 19 January 2000 (age 26)

Cycling career
- Sport: Cycling
- Current team: Hitec Products–Fluid Control
- Discipline: Road
- Role: Rider

Amateur teams
- 2017: Horten og Omegn's CK
- 2018–2019: Team Rytger powered by Cykeltøj-Online.dk
- 2020: Ringerike SK

Professional team
- 2020–: Hitec Products–Birk Sport

Martine Gjøs (born 19 January 2000) is a Norwegian professional racing cyclist, who currently rides for UCI Women's Continental Team Hitec Products–Fluid Control. She rode in the women's road race event at the 2020 UCI Road World Championships.
