= 2020 UCI Road World Championships – Women's road race =

Cycling race

Women's road race
2020 UCI Road World Championships
- Rainbow jersey

Race details
- Dates: 26 September 2020
- Stages: 1 in Imola, Italy
- Distance: 143 km (89 mi)
- Winning time: 4h 09' 57"

Medalists
	Gold	(Netherlands) Anna van der Breggen (NED)
	Silver	(Netherlands) Annemiek van Vleuten (NED)
	Bronze	(Italy) Elisa Longo Borghini (ITA)

The Women's road race of the 2020 UCI Road World Championships was a cycling event that took place on 26 September 2020 in Imola, Italy. Annemiek van Vleuten was the defending champion.

Anna van der Breggen from the Netherlands became the first rider in 25 years to win both the road race and time trial titles at a single World Championships, after a 40-kilometre (25-mile) solo attack. She finished 80 seconds clear of her closest competitors, to win her second world title in three years. The silver medal went to compatriot van Vleuten, who was riding the race with a brace on a fractured wrist – having completed a U-turn on competing in the race – following a crash the week prior at the Giro Rosa. The bronze medal was taken by Italy's Elisa Longo Borghini, losing out to van Vleuten in a two-up sprint.

The race took place on a 28.8 kilometres (17.9 mi) course, starting and finishing at the Autodromo Internazionale Enzo e Dino Ferrari (a motor racing circuit). Heading out from the Autodromo into the Emilia-Romagna countryside, the course used two climbs with an average gradient of 10% separated by the town of Riolo Terme, before returning to the Autodromo. The women's road race lapped the course five times, making a total of 143 kilometres (89 mi).

== Qualification ==
=== Participating nations ===
Following the withdrawals of Chloé Dygert and Rotem Gafinovitz after the time trial two days prior to the race, 143 cyclists from 41 nations were listed to start the 143-kilometre (89 mi)-long course. Three further riders did not start the race. The number of cyclists per nation is shown in parentheses.

- Argentina (1)
- Australia (7)
- Austria (3)
- Belgium (6)
- Belarus (~~2~~ 1)
- Canada (6)
- Chile (1)
- Colombia (3)
- Cuba (1)
- Czech Republic (3)
- Denmark (6)
- Spain (6)
- Estonia (1)
- Ethiopia (1)
- France (5)
- Germany (7)
- Great Britain (6)
- Hungary (1)
- Iceland (3)
- Israel (1)
- Italy (7)
- Japan (1)
- Latvia (1)
- Lithuania (3)
- Luxembourg (3)
- Morocco (2)
- Mexico (4)
- Netherlands (8)
- Norway (~~6~~ 5)
- New Zealand (3)
- Poland (6)
- South Africa (2)
- Russia (3)
- Slovenia (5)
- Switzerland (4)
- Slovakia (1)
- Sweden (3)
- Trinidad and Tobago (1)
- Ukraine (3)
- United States (6)
- Uzbekistan (~~1~~ 0)

== Final classification ==
Of the race's 140 entrants, 105 riders completed the full distance of 143 kilometres (89 mi).

Rank	Rider	Country	Time
1	Anna van der Breggen	Netherlands	4h 09' 57"
2	Annemiek van Vleuten	Netherlands	+ 1' 20"
3	Elisa Longo Borghini	Italy	+ 1' 20"
4	Marianne Vos	Netherlands	+ 2' 01"
5	Liane Lippert	Germany	+ 2' 01"
6	Lizzie Deignan	United Kingdom	+ 2' 01"
7	Katarzyna Niewiadoma	Poland	+ 2' 01"
8	Cecilie Uttrup Ludwig	Denmark	+ 2' 41"
9	Lisa Brennauer	Germany	+ 3' 08"
10	Marlen Reusser	Switzerland	+ 3' 08"
11	Lauren Stephens	United States	+ 3' 08"
12	Chantal van den Broek-Blaak	Netherlands	+ 3' 08"
13	Audrey Cordon-Ragot	France	+ 3' 08"
14	Eugenia Bujak	Slovenia	+ 3' 08"
15	Niamh Fisher-Black	New Zealand	+ 3' 08"
16	Rasa Leleivytė	Lithuania	+ 3' 08"
17	Urša Pintar	Slovenia	+ 3' 08"
18	Margarita Victoria García	Spain	+ 3' 08"
19	Ellen van Dijk	Netherlands	+ 3' 08"
20	Évita Muzic	France	+ 3' 08"
21	Eri Yonamine	Japan	+ 3' 08"
22	Mikayla Harvey	New Zealand	+ 3' 08"
23	Ane Santesteban	Spain	+ 3' 08"
24	Katrine Aalerud	Norway	+ 3' 08"
25	Anna Shackley	United Kingdom	+ 3' 08"
26	Tayler Wiles	United States	+ 3' 08"
27	Sandra Levenez	France	+ 3' 08"
28	Lucy Kennedy	Australia	+ 3' 08"
29	Kristabel Doebel-Hickok	United States	+ 3' 08"
30	Alison Jackson	Canada	+ 4' 49"
31	Katia Ragusa	Italy	+ 4' 51"
32	Brodie Chapman	Australia	+ 5' 50"
33	Marta Cavalli	Italy	+ 7' 25"
34	Amy Pieters	Netherlands	+ 9' 29"
35	Demi Vollering	Netherlands	+ 9' 29"
36	Hannah Barnes	United Kingdom	+ 9' 29"
37	Coryn Rivera	United States	+ 10' 16"
38	Špela Kern	Slovenia	+ 10' 16"
39	Arlenis Sierra	Cuba	+ 10' 16"
40	Omer Shapira	Israel	+ 10' 16"
41	Juliette Labous	France	+ 10' 16"
42	Sara Poidevin	Canada	+ 10' 16"
43	Aigul Gareeva	Russia	+ 11' 50"
44	Anna Kiesenhofer	Austria	+ 11' 53"
45	Tatiana Guderzo	Italy	+ 12' 56"
46	Georgia Williams	New Zealand	+ 14' 01"
47	Teniel Campbell	Trinidad and Tobago	+ 14' 01"
48	Marta Lach	Poland	+ 14' 01"
49	Maria Novolodskaya	Russia	+ 14' 01"
50	Valerie Demey	Belgium	+ 14' 01"
51	Rachel Neylan	Australia	+ 14' 01"
52	Hanna Nilsson	Sweden	+ 14' 01"
53	Jesse Vandenbulcke	Belgium	+ 14' 01"
54	Kata Blanka Vas	Hungary	+ 14' 01"
55	Paula Patiño	Colombia	+ 14' 01"
56	Ashleigh Moolman	South Africa	+ 14' 01"
57	Yevheniya Vysotska	Ukraine	+ 14' 01"
58	Elise Chabbey	Switzerland	+ 14' 01"
59	Leah Kirchmann	Canada	+ 14' 01"
60	Anna Henderson	United Kingdom	+ 14' 01"
61	Emma Cecilie Norsgaard	Denmark	+ 14' 01"
62	Christine Majerus	Luxembourg	+ 14' 01"
63	Lizzy Banks	United Kingdom	+ 14' 01"
64	Nikola Nosková	Czech Republic	+ 14' 01"
65	Erica Magnaldi	Italy	+ 14' 01"
66	Karol-Ann Canuel	Canada	+ 14' 01"
67	Soraya Paladin	Italy	+ 14' 01"
68	Sarah Roy	Australia	+ 14' 43"
69	Amber Neben	United States	+ 15' 08"
70	Susanne Andersen	Norway	+ 15' 13"
71	Stine Borgli	Norway	+ 15' 13"
72	Victorie Guilman	France	+ 15' 13"
73	Melanie Maurer	Switzerland	+ 15' 13"
74	Tereza Neumanová	Czech Republic	+ 18' 03"
75	Franziska Koch	Germany	+ 20' 08"
76	Jarmila Machačová	Czech Republic	+ 21' 12"
77	Diana Klimova	Russia	+ 21' 18"
78	Julia Biryukova	Ukraine	+ 21' 20"
79	Sara Martín	Spain	+ 21' 20"
80	Małgorzata Jasińska	Poland	+ 21' 22"
81	Ariadna Gutiérrez	Mexico	+ 22' 57"
82	Lija Laizāne	Latvia	+ 22' 57"
83	Carolina Upegui	Colombia	+ 22' 57"
84	Anastasiya Kolesava	Belarus	+ 23' 42"
85	Karolina Kumięga	Poland	+ 23' 42"
86	Sarah Rijkes	Austria	+ 23' 42"
87	Noemi Rüegg	Switzerland	+ 23' 42"
88	Eyeru Tesfoam Gebru	Ethiopia	+ 26' 47"
89	Ingrid Lorvik	Norway	+ 26' 47"
90	Amalie Dideriksen	Denmark	+ 26' 47"
91	Grace Brown	Australia	+ 26' 47"
92	Floortje Mackaij	Netherlands	+ 26' 47"
93	Julie Leth	Denmark	+ 26' 47"
94	Lone Meertens	Belgium	+ 26' 47"
95	Tereza Medveďová	Slovakia	+ 26' 47"
96	Catalina Soto	Chile	+ 26' 47"
97	Alicia González Blanco	Spain	+ 26' 47"
98	Sandra Alonso	Spain	+ 26' 47"
99	Mieke Kröger	Germany	+ 27' 47"
100	Fien van Eynde	Belgium	+ 27' 47"
101	Kathrin Hammes	Germany	+ 27' 47"
102	Mieke Docx	Belgium	+ 27' 47"
103	Olivija Baleišytė	Lithuania	+ 29' 24"
104	Julia Borgström	Sweden	+ 30' 06"
105	Urška Žigart	Slovenia	+ 33' 33"

Rank	Rider	Country	Time
	Ruth Winder	United States	DNF
	Gloria Rodríguez	Spain	DNF
	Tiffany Cromwell	Australia	DNF
	Lisa Nordén	Sweden	DNF
	Alice Barnes	United Kingdom	DNF
	Elena Cecchini	Italy	DNF
	Romy Kasper	Germany	DNF
	Trixi Worrack	Germany	DNF
	Angelika Tazreiter	Austria	DNF
	Fernanda Yapura	Argentina	DNF
	Brenda Santoyo	Mexico	DNF
	Andrea Ramírez	Mexico	DNF
	Katarzyna Wilkos	Poland	DNF
	Urška Bravec	Slovenia	DNF
	Ann-Sophie Duyck	Belgium	DNF
	Valeriya Kononenko	Ukraine	DNF
	Shara Gillow	Australia	DNF
	Pernille Mathiesen	Denmark	DNF
	Anna Plichta	Poland	DNF
	Birgitte Krogsgaard	Denmark	DNF
	Daniela Atehortua	Colombia	DNF
	Magdeleine Vallieres	Canada	DNF
	Fatima El Hayani	Morocco	DNF
	Maria Gaxiola	Mexico	DNF
	Akvilė Gedraitytė	Lithuania	DNF
	Kerry Jonker	South Africa	DNF
	Nina Berton	Luxembourg	DNF
	Marie-Soleil Blais	Canada	DNF
	Mae Lang	Estonia	DNF
	Bríet Kristý Gunnarsdóttir	Iceland	DNF
	Agusta Edda Bjornsdóttir	Iceland	DNF
	Hafdís Sigurðardóttir	Iceland	DNF
	Claire Faber	Luxembourg	DNF
	Martine Gjøs	Norway	DNF
	Siham Es Sad	Morocco	DNF
	Mie Bjørndal Ottestad	Norway	DNS
	Alena Amialiusik	Belarus	DNS
	Olga Zabelinskaya	Uzbekistan	DNS
