= Oceania Triathlon =

International sports governing body

- Sport: Triathlon
- Jurisdiction: Oceania
- Membership: 13
- Abbreviation: OTU
- Affiliation: TRI
- Headquarters: Milton, Queensland
- President: Pete de Wet
- Vice president: Lani Wendt Young

Official website
- oceania.triathlon.org

Oceania Triathlon, previously known as the Oceania Triathlon Union (OTU) is an association of the World Triathlon's member federations from Oceania.

== Competitions administered by the OTU ==
- Triathlon at the Pacific Games
- Oceania Triathlon Championships

== Member associations ==
- American Samoa Triathlon Association
- Triathlon Australia
- Cook Islands Triathlon Federation
- Fiji Triathlon Federation
- Guam Triathlon Federation
- Norfolk Island Triathlon Association
- Triathlon Association of the CMNI
- Triathlon New Zealand
- Palau Triathlon Federation
- Papua New Guinea Triathlon Association
- Tri-Sports Samoa Association
- Triathlon Solomon Islands
- Federation Tahitienne de Triathlon
- Tonga - Friendly Islands Triathlon Association

== See also ==
- World Triathlon
