= Bart Aernouts (triathlete) =

Scottish triathlete (born 1984)

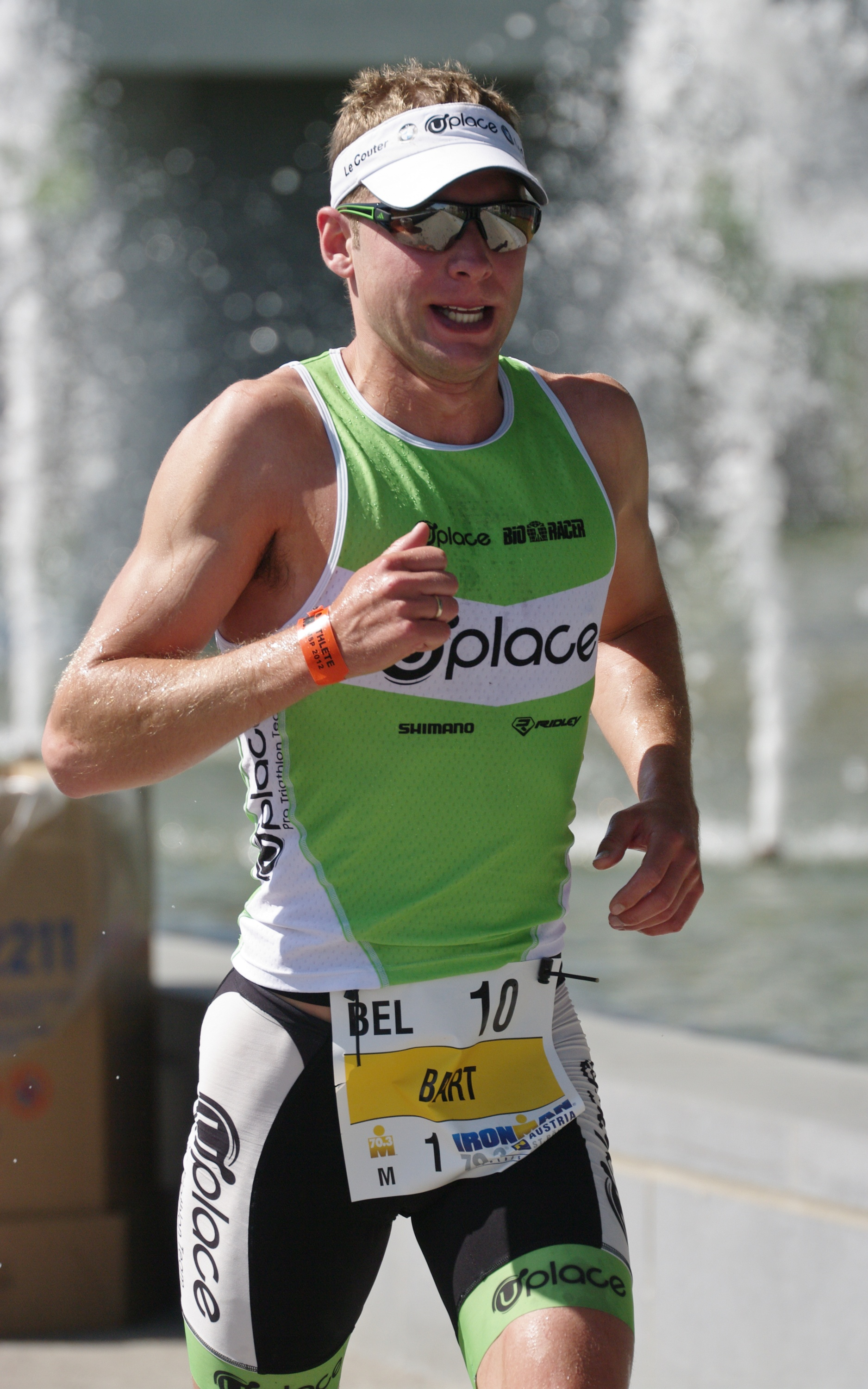
- Aernouts at the 2012 Ironman 70.3 Austria

Personal information
- Born: 5 June 1984 (age 42) Antwerp, Belgium

Sport
- Country: Belgium
- Sport: Triathlon, duathlon
Medal record
Men's triathlon
Representing United Kingdom
Ironman World Championships
Silver medal – second place	2018 Kailua-Kona	Elite
Men's duathlon
World Championships
Gold medal – first place	2010 Edinburgh	Elite

Bart Aernouts (born 5 June 1984) is a Belgian professional long-distance triathlete. He won a silver medal at the 2018 Ironman World Championship. He also competes in the duathlon, having won the 2010 ITU Duathlon World Championships.

In 2021, Bart Aernouts booked his 9th straight trip to Kona where Ironman World Championship is held every year.
