= Powerman Zofingen =

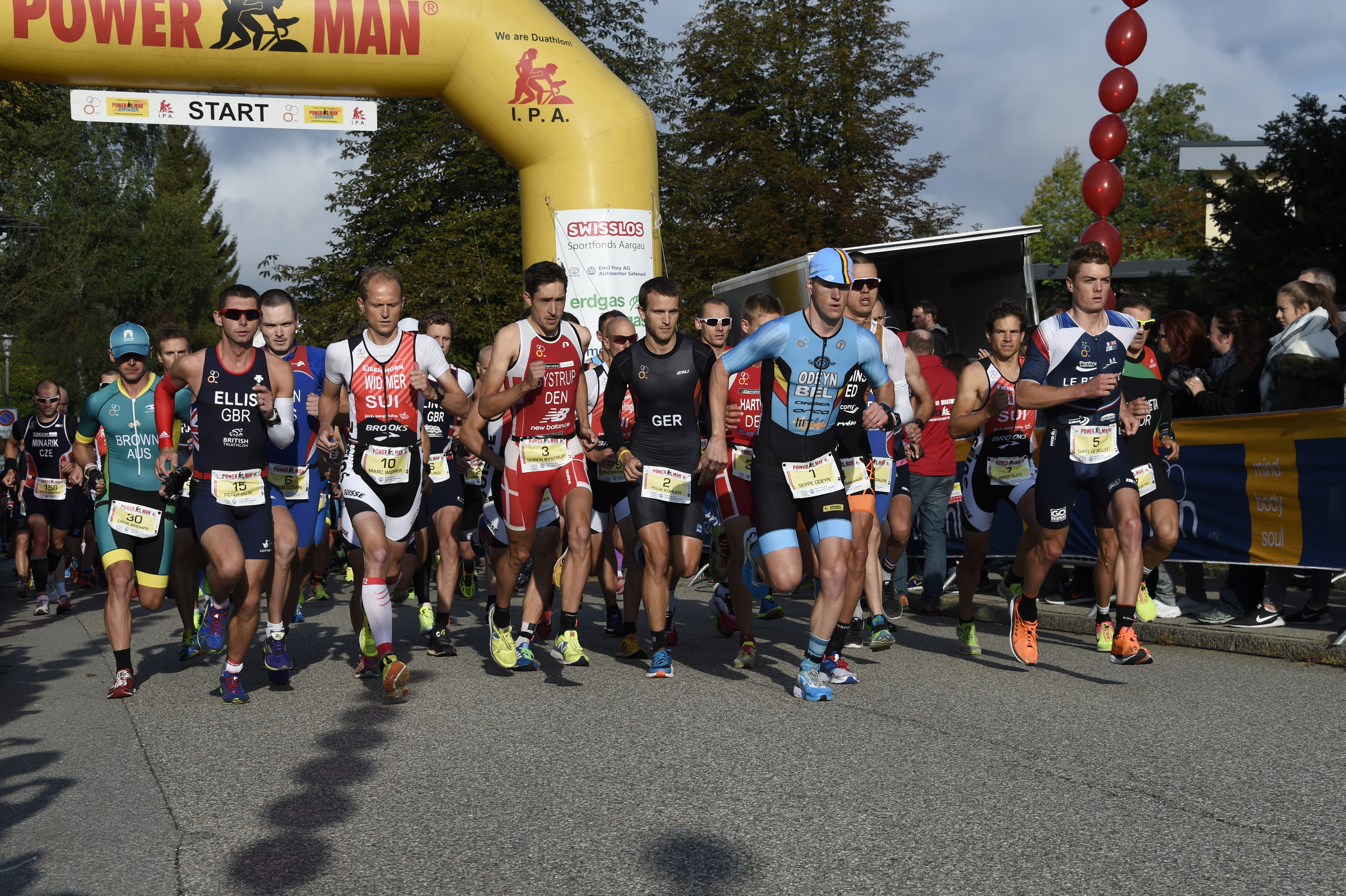
Powerman World Championships 2017 Men's Start

The Powerman Zofingen is a duathlon event in Zofingen (Switzerland) within the Powerman Duathlon World Series. On September 3, 2017, the world championships in the long distance was held for the tenth time in Zofingen, canton Argovia. The official name is ITU Powerman Long Distance Duathlon World Championships.

A duathlon consists of a running distance, a cycling lane and then again a running distance, which are carried out directly behind each other. Since 2002, the long-distance duathlon in Zofingen has the sequence of 10 km (6.2 mi) running, 150 km (93 mi) cycling and 30 km (19 mi) running.

== History ==
Established in 1989, the Powerman Zofingen is to duathletes what the Ironman Hawaii is for triathletes. Bruno Imfeld and Urs Linsi brought the Powerman in Switzerland to life. The first race took place on 4 June 1989 over the distances 2.5 km (1.6 mi) running – 120 km (75 mi) cycling – 30.5 km (19.0 mi) running. The first winners celebrated were Hermine Haas (Switzerland) in the women's section and Andreas Rudolph (Germany) in the men's section.

One of the most famous winners in Zofingen is the Swiss Natascha Badmann - she won the duathlon in Switzerland in 1996, 1997 and 2000. Furthermore, Badmann was the first European woman to win the Ironman Triathlon World Championship. She won the Ironman Triathlon World Championship in Hawaii in 1998, 2000, 2001, 2002, 2004, and 2005. The most successful athlete ever was Olivier Bernhard. The Swiss won the Duathlon eight times and earned the nickname "King of Zofingen". In January 2010, Olivier Bernhard, together with David Allemann and Caspar Coppetti, founded On AG and is involved in the development of running shoes.

For current overall rankings, see ITU Duathlon Points List Elite Men and Elite Women. Furthermore, the International Triathlete Union provides athlete search options for both triathletes and duathletes.

== Ranking list: Men ==
Medallists Men: Powerman Zofingen - Long Distance Duathlon

YEAR	RUN-CYCLE-RUN	RANK	ATHLETE	COUNTRY	TIME
1989	2,5/120/30,5 km	1	Andreas Rudolph	GER	05:22:54
1989	2,5/120/30,5 km	2	Peter Hunziker	SUI	05:31:25
1989	2,5/120/30,5 km	3	Bruno Wüthrich	SUI	05:32:35
1990	5/150/30 km	1	Ken Souza	USA	05:58:44
1990	5/150/30 km	2	Andreas Rudolph	GER	06:06:07
1990	5/150/30 km	3	Charly Schmid	SUI	06:19:14
1991	7,5/150/30 km	1	Scott Molina	USA	06:20:24
1991	7,5/150/30 km	2	Mike Pigg	USA	06:28:50
1991	7,5/150/30 km	3	Jeff Devlin	USA	06:30:51
1992	7,5/150/30 km	1	Jürgen Zäck	GER	06:22:44
1992	7,5/150/30 km	2	Ken Souza	USA	06:26:25
1992	7,5/150/30 km	3	Albert Zweifel	SUI	06:26:37
1993	7,5/150/30 km	1	Mark Allen	USA	06:19:41
1993	7,5/150/30 km	2	Jos Everts	NED	06:28:57
1993	7,5/150/30 km	3	Joel Claisse	BEL	06:29:54
1994	7,5/150/30 km	1	Olivier Bernhard	SUI	06:19:44
1994	7,5/150/30 km	2	Jeff Devlin	USA	06:28:51
1994	7,5/150/30 km	3	Jürgen Zäck	GER	06:32:31
1995	13,5/150/30 km	1	Urs Dellsperger	SUI	06:59:45
1995	13,5/150/30 km	2	Olaf Sabatschus	GER	07:06:29
1995	13,5/150/30 km	3	Rainer Müller	GER	07:08:49
1996	13,5/150/30 km	1	Olivier Bernhard	SUI	06:47:21
1996	13,5/150/30 km	2	Urs Dellsperger	SUI	06:50:25
1996	13,5/150/30 km	3	Daniel Keller	SUI	06:54:25
1997	8,5/150/30 km	1	Urs Dellsperger	SUI	06:30:08
1997	8,5/150/30 km	2	Daniel Keller	SUI	06:31:14
1997	8,5/150/30 km	3	Olivier Bernhard	SUI	06:36:26
1998	8,5/150/30 km	1	Olivier Bernhard	SUI	06:22:04
1998	8,5/150/30 km	2	René Rovera	FRA	06:29:15
1998	8,5/150/30 km	3	Pierre-Alain Frossard	SUI	06:29:15
1999	8,5/150/30 km	1	Olivier Bernhard	SUI	06:32:05
1999	8,5/150/30 km	2	Daniel Keller	SUI	06:40:49
1999	8,5/150/30 km	3	Felix Martinez	ESP	06:44:10
2000	8,5/150/30 km	1	Olivier Bernhard	SUI	06:23:10
2000	8,5/150/30 km	2	Daniel Keller	SUI	06:26:14
2000	8,5/150/30 km	3	Olaf Sabatschus	GER	06:27:24
2001	8,5/150/30 km	1	Olivier Bernhard	SUI	06:32:09
2001	8,5/150/30 km	2	Felix Martinez	ESP	06:36:14
2001	8,5/150/30 km	3	Olaf Sabatschus	GER	06:44:34
2002	10/150/30 km	1	Olivier Bernhard	SUI	06:24:37
2002	10/150/30 km	2	Stefan Riesen	SUI	06:25:35
2002	10/150/30 km	3	Huub Maas	NED	06:31:16
2003	10/150/30 km	1	Stefan Riesen	SUI	06:28:45
2003	10/150/30 km	2	Benny Vansteelant	BEL	06:30:54
2003	10/150/30 km	3	Huub Maas	NED	06:32:24
2004	10/150/30 km	1	Olivier Bernhard	SUI	06:26:22
2004	10/150/30 km	2	Felix Martinez	ESP	06:36:39
2004	10/150/30 km	3	Nico Huybrechts	BEL	06:41:39
2005	10/150/30 km	1	Benny Vansteelant	BEL	06:31:01
2005	10/150/30 km	2	Koen Maris	BEL	06:40:54
2005	10/150/30 km	3	Josh Beck	USA	06:44:03
2006	10/158/30 km	1	Benny Vansteelant	BEL	06:58:54
2006	10/158/30 km	2	Dominique Duchene	FRA	07:03:39
2006	10/158/30 km	3	Koen Maris	BEL	07:07:23
2007	10/150/30 km	1	Koen Maris	BEL	06:21:00
2007	10/150/30 km	2	Aksel Nielsen	DEN	06:32:21
2007	10/150/30 km	3	Loïc Hélin	BEL	06:34:10
2008	10/150/30 km	1	Andy Sutz	SUI	06:29:44
2008	10/150/30 km	2	Pascal Schuler	FRA	06:35:34
2008	10/150/30 km	3	Dominique Duchene	FRA	06:36:04
2009	10/150/30 km	1	Joerie Vansteelant	BEL	06:11:35
2009	10/150/30 km	2	Andy Sutz	SUI	06:27:35
2009	10/150/30 km	3	Anthony Le Duey	FRA	06:36:04
2010	10/150/30 km	1	Andy Sutz	SUI	06:19:03
2010	10/150/30 km	2	Thibaut Humbert	FRA	06:19:57
2010	10/150/30 km	3	Anthony Le Duey	FRA	06:27:52
2011	10/150/30 km	1	Joerie Vansteelant	BEL	06:07:15
2011	10/150/30 km	2	Thibaut Humbert	FRA	06:16:58
2011	10/150/30 km	3	Andy Sutz	SUI	06:18:28
2012	10/150/30 km	1	Joerie Vansteelant	BEL	06:07:58
2012	10/150/30 km	2	Rob Woestenborghs	BEL	06:12:34
2012	10/150/30 km	3	Søren Bystrup	DEN	06:21:38
2013	10/150/30 km	1	Rob Woestenborgs	BEL	06:21:39
2013	10/150/30 km	2	André Moser	SUI	06:24:16
2013	10/150/30 km	3	Michael Wetzel	GER	06:24:47
2014	10/150/30 km	1	Gaël Le Bellec	FRA	06:21:47
2014	10/150/30 km	2	Yannick Cadalen	FRA	06:26:05
2014	10/150/30 km	3	Søren Bystrup	DEN	06:27:44
2015	10/150/30 km	1	Gaël Le Bellec	FRA	06:20:36
2015	10/150/30 km	2	Seppe Odeyn	BEL	06:24:59
2015	10/150/30 km	3	Søren Bystrup	DEN	06:25:35
2016	10/150/30 km	1	Seppe Odeyn	BEL	06:23:43
2016	10/150/30 km	2	Felix Köhler	GER	06:28:55
2016	10/150/30 km	3	Søren Bystrup	DEN	06:33:48
2017	10/150/30 km	1	Maxim Kuzmin	RUS	06:31:04
2017	10/150/30 km	2	Seppe Odeyn	BEL	06:32:30
2017	10/150/30 km	3	Søren Bystrup	DEN	06:34:52
2018	10/150/30 km	1	Gaël Le Bellec	FRA	06:07:50
2018	10/150/30 km	2	Yannick Cadalen	FRA	06:10:29
2018	10/150/30 km	3	Felix Köhler	GER	06:12:42
2019	10/150/30 km	1	Diego Van Looy	BEL	06:14:29
2019	10/150/30 km	2	Jens-Michael Gossauer	SUI	06:16:23
2019	10/150/30 km	3	Daan De Groot	NED	06:20:16
2021	10/150/30 km	1	Seppe Odeyn	BEL	06:06:41
2021	10/150/30 km	2	Jens-Michael Gossauer	SUI	06:19:15
2021	10/150/30 km	3	Matthieu Bourgeois	FRA	06:24:27

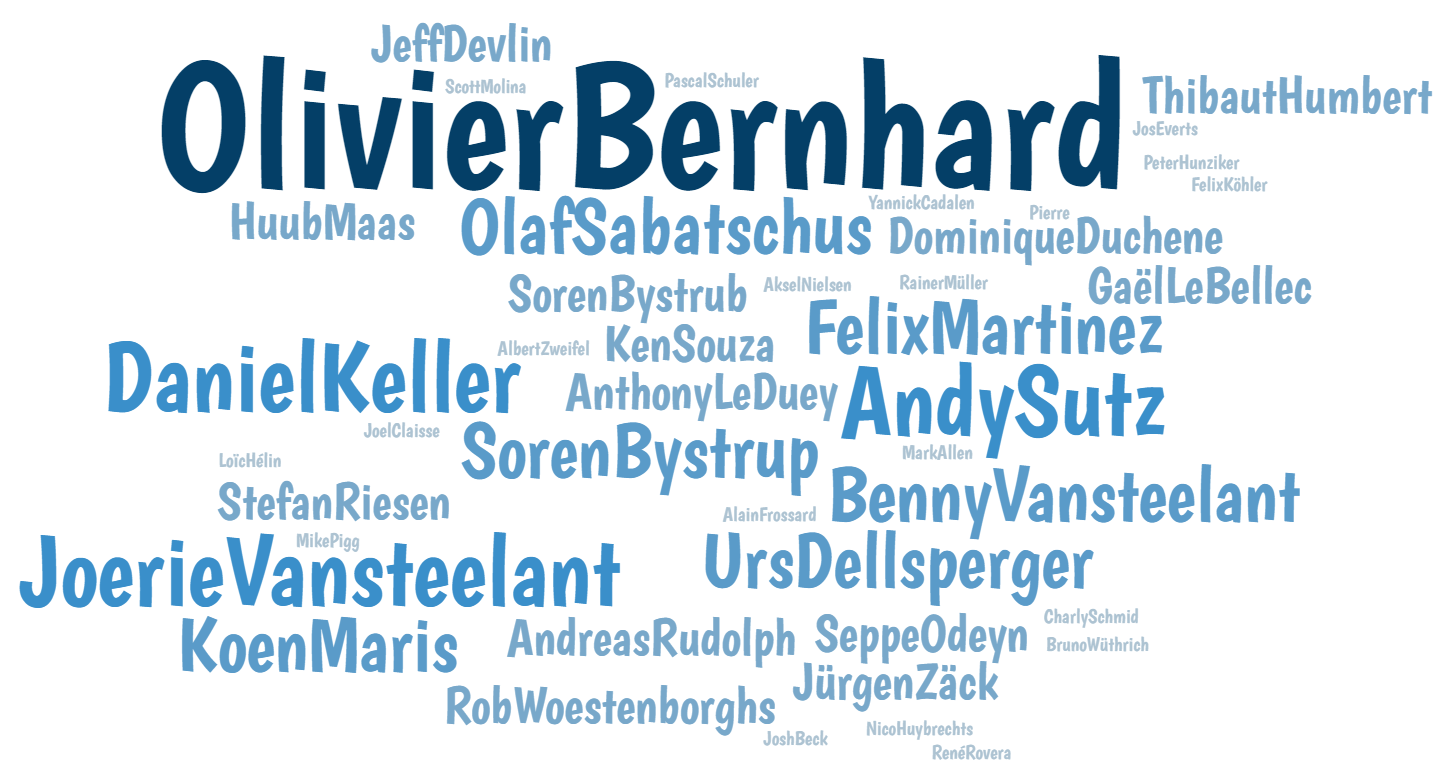
Word cloud according to medallists men since 1989. Olivier Bernhard was nine times on the podium, Daniel Keller, Andy Stutz and Joerie Vansteelant four times.

== Ranking list: Women ==
Medallists Women: Powerman Zofingen - Long Distance Duathlon

YEAR	RUN-CYCLE-RUN	RANK	ATHLETE	COUNTRY	TIME
1989	2,5/120/30,5 km	1	Hermine Haas	SUI	06:15:05
1989	2,5/120/30,5 km	2	Ursula Meyer	SUI	06:21:35
1989	2,5/120/30,5 km	3	Christine Günthardt	SUI	06:57:26
1990	5/150/30 km	1	Silvia Nussbaumer	AUT	07:13:13
1990	5/150/30 km	2	H.A. Verdonk	NED	07:18:24
1990	5/150/30 km	3	Brigitte Röllin	SUI	07:25:54
1991	7,5/150/30 km	1	Paula Newby-Fraser	USA	06:58:10
1991	7,5/150/30 km	2	Thea Sybesma	NED	07:17:04
1991	7,5/150/30 km	3	Sarah Coope	GBR	07:17:23
1992	7,5/150/30 km	1	Erin Baker	NZL	06:58:01
1992	7,5/150/30 km	2	Liz Downing	USA	07:00:28
1992	7,5/150/30 km	3	Thea Sybesma	NED	07:10:27
1993	7,5/150/30 km	1	Maddy Tormoen	USA	07:14:49
1993	7,5/150/30 km	2	Donna Peters	USA	07:15:58
1993	7,5/150/30 km	3	Julieanne White	CAN	07:21:31
1994	7,5/150/30 km	1	Erin Baker	NZL	07:07:22
1994	7,5/150/30 km	2	Maddy Tormoen	USA	07:17:15
1994	7,5/150/30 km	3	Monika Feuersinger	AUT	07:24:33
1995	13,5/150/30 km	1	Maddy Tormoen	USA	07:42:43
1995	13,5/150/30 km	2	Isabelle Mouton	FR	07:50:27
1995	13,5/150/30 km	3	Martina Weise	GER	08:00:44
1996	13,5/150/30 km	1	Natascha Badmann	SUI	07:36:31
1996	13,5/150/30 km	2	Irma Heeren	NED	07:51:45
1996	13,5/150/30 km	3	Debbie Nelson	NZL	07:56:07
1997	8,5/150/30 km	1	Natascha Badmann	SUI	07:11:03
1997	8,5/150/30 km	2	Susanne Nedergaard	DEN	07:27:26
1997	8,5/150/30 km	3	Debbie Nelson	NZL	07:29:17
1998	8,5/150/30 km	1	Lori Bowden	CAN	07:21:51
1998	8,5/150/30 km	2	Susanne Rufer	SUI	07:27:34
1998	8,5/150/30 km	3	Debbie Nelson	NZL	07:28:13
1999	8,5/150/30 km	1	Debbie Nelson	NZL	07:35:58
1999	8,5/150/30 km	2	Alena Peterkova	POL	07:54:14
1999	8,5/150/30 km	3	Ariane Gutknecht	SUI	07:55:38
2000	8,5/150/30 km	1	Natascha Badmann	SUI	07:17:31
2000	8,5/150/30 km	2	Susanne Rufer	SUI	07:24:42
2000	8,5/150/30 km	3	Karin Thürig	SUI	07:30:09
2001	8,5/150/30 km	1	Karin Thürig	SUI	07:16:57
2001	8,5/150/30 km	2	Erika Csomor	HUN	07:34:47
2001	8,5/150/30 km	3	Ariane Schumacher	SUI	07:36:19
2002	10/150/30 km	1	Karin Thürig	SUI	07:04:08
2002	10/150/30 km	2	Ariane Schumacher	SUI	07:39:22
2002	10/150/30 km	3	Bella Comerford	GBR	07:43:09
2003	10/150/30 km	1	Fiona Docherty	NZL	07:37:47
2003	10/150/30 km	2	Erika Csomor	HUN	07:38:29
2003	10/150/30 km	3	Bella Comerford	GBR	07:39:40
2004	10/150/30 km	1	Erika Csomor	HUN	07:26:20
2004	10/150/30 km	2	Jess Draskau	GBR	07:30:17
2004	10/150/30 km	3	Nicole Klingler	LIE	07:37:50
2005	10/150/30 km	1	Erika Csomor	HUN	07:30:24
2005	10/150/30 km	2	Jess Draskau	GBR	07:32:20
2005	10/150/30 km	3	Tamara Kozulina	UKR	07:34:51
2006	10/158/30 km	1	Erika Csomor	HUN	07:52:49
2006	10/158/30 km	2	Jess Draskau	GBR	08:08:15
2006	10/158/30 km	3	Maja Jacober	SUI	08:12:48
2007	10/150/30 km	1	Erika Csomor	HUN	07:06:38
2007	10/150/30 km	2	Eva Nyström	SWE	07:22:06
2007	10/150/30 km	3	Maja Jacober	SUI	07:38:42
2008	10/150/30 km	1	Erika Csomor	HUN	07:14:43
2008	10/150/30 km	2	Eva Nyström	SWE	07:36:42
2008	10/150/30 km	3	Maja Jacober	SUI	07:43:30
2009	10/150/30 km	1	Erika Csomor	HUN	07:20:36
2009	10/150/30 km	2	Jessica Petersson	GBR	07:27:12
2009	10/150/30 km	3	Camilla Lindholm	SWE	07:30:26
2010	10/150/30 km	1	Erika Csomor	HUN	07:20:52
2010	10/150/30 km	2	Jacqueline Uebelhart	SUI	07:32:44
2010	10/150/30 km	3	Camilla Lindholm	SWE	07:37:08
2011	10/150/30 km	1	Melanie Burke	NZL	07:11:43
2011	10/150/30 km	2	Eva Nyström	SWE	07:15:10
2011	10/150/30 km	3	Erika Csomor	HUN	07:22:42
2012	10/150/30 km	1	Eva Nyström	SWE	07:05:48
2012	10/150/30 km	2	Gossage Lucy	GBR	07:10:09
2012	10/150/30 km	3	May Kerstens	NED	07:25:25
2013	10/150/30 km	1	Eva Nyström	SWE	07:13:08
2013	10/150/30 km	2	Julia Viellehner	GER	07:24:36
2013	10/150/30 km	3	Ruth Brennan Morrey	USA	07:27:04
2014	10/150/30 km	1	Emma Pooley	GBR	06:47:27
2014	10/150/30 km	2	Eva Nyström	SWE	07:19:17
2014	10/150/30 km	3	Laura Hrebec	SUI	07:20:52
2015	10/150/30 km	1	Emma Pooley	GBR	07:01:49
2015	10/150/30 km	2	Julia Viellehner	GER	07:12:24
2015	10/150/30 km	3	Susanne Svendsen	DEN	07:20:33
2016	10/150/30 km	1	Emma Pooley	GBR	07:06:16
2016	10/150/30 km	2	Nina Brenn	SUI	07:17:17
2016	10/150/30 km	3	Susanne Svendsen	DEN	07:31:42
2017	10/150/30 km	1	Emma Pooley	GBR	07:21:04
2017	10/150/30 km	2	Miriam Van Reijen	NED	07:48:19
2017	10/150/30 km	3	Katrin Esefeld	GER	07:49:05
2018	10/150/30 km	1	Petra Eggenschwiler	SUI	07:00:39
2018	10/150/30 km	2	Melanie Maurer	SUI	07:22:42
2018	10/150/30 km	3	Antonia Reznikov	ISR	07:24:20
2019	10/150/30 km	1	Nina Zoller	SUI	07:14:54
2019	10/150/30 km	2	Melanie Maurer	SUI	07:17:11
2019	10/150/30 km	3	Corina Hengartner	SUI	07:27:46
2021	10/150/30 km	1	Merle Brunnée	GER	07:07:27
2021	10/150/30 km	2	Nikola Corbova	SVK	07:21:13
2021	10/150/30 km	3	Sarah Noemi Frieden	SUI	07:39:42

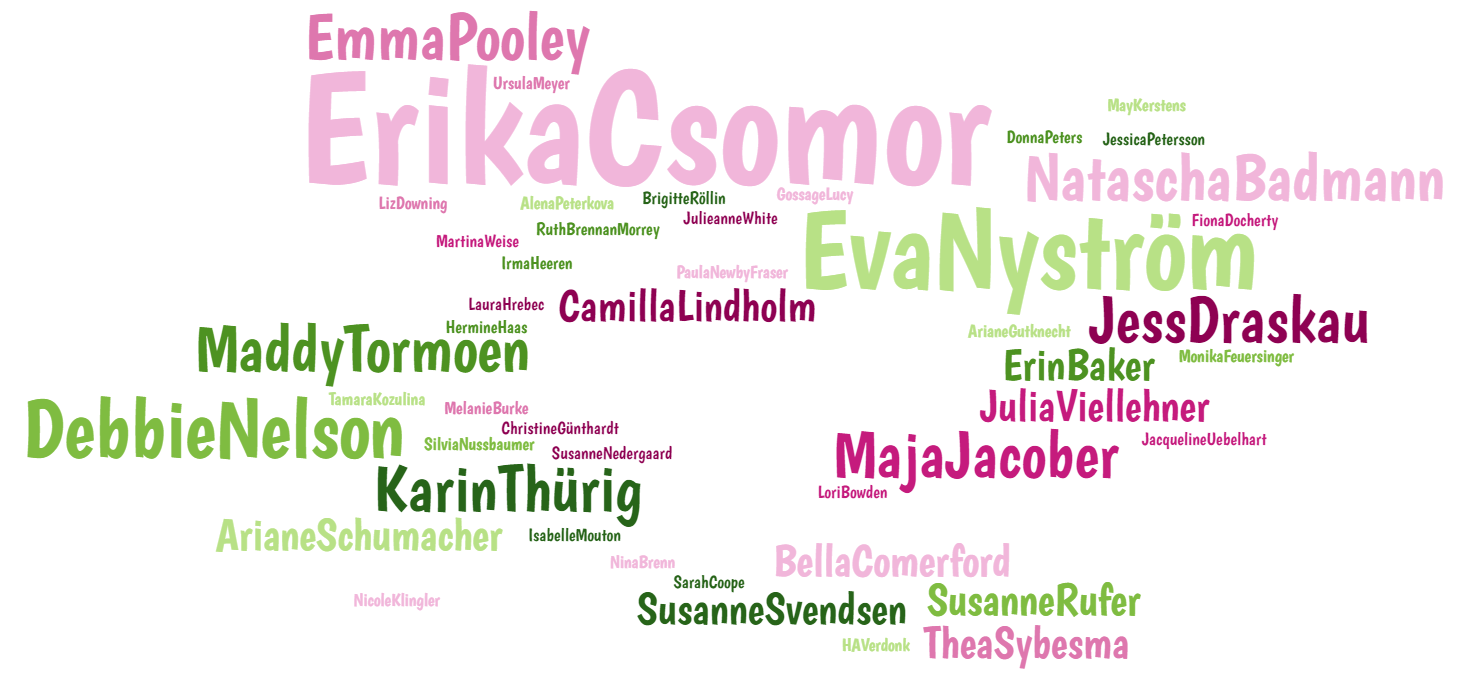
Word cloud according to podium places (medallists women). Erika Csomor was ten times on the podium, Eva Nyström six times and Debbie Nelson four times.
