= Carolina Upegui =

Colombian cyclist

Personal information
- Full name: Carolina Upegui Quevedo
- Born: 16 March 1989 (age 37)

Cycling career
- Sport: Cycling
- Current team: Colnago CM Team
- Discipline: Road
- Role: Rider

Amateur team
- 2020–2021: Colnago CM Team

Professional team
- 2021–: Colnago CM Team

Carolina Upegui Quevedo (born 16 March 1989) is a Colombian professional racing cyclist, who currently rides for UCI Women's Continental Team Colnago CM Team. She rode in the women's road race event at the 2020 UCI Road World Championships.
