= Catriona Morrison =

British athlete

Catriona Morrison MBE
Personal information
- Born: 11 January 1977 (age 49) Glasgow, Scotland
Medal record
Representing Great Britain
Women's duathlon
ITU Duathlon World Championships
Silver medal – second place	2005 Newcastle	Individual
Gold medal – first place	2006 Corner Brook	Individual
Silver medal – second place	2008 Rimini	Individual
Gold medal – first place	2010 Edinburgh	Individual
ITU Long Distance Duathlon World Championships
Silver medal – second place	2006 Fredericia	Individual
Gold medal – first place	2007 Richmond	Individual
Gold medal – first place	2008 Geel	Individual
ETU Duathlon European Championships
Gold medal – first place	2007 Edinburgh	Individual
Gold medal – first place	2009 Budapest	Individual
Women's triathlon
ITU Long Distance Triathlon World Championships
Bronze medal – third place	2007 Lorient	Individual

Catriona ("Cat") Anne Morrison MBE (born 11 January 1977, in Glasgow) is a British triathlete and duathlete of Scottish origin.

== Career ==
In 2005, she won the silver medal at the ITU Duathlon World Championships. In 2006, she followed this up with gold and took another silver medal at the Long Distance Duathlon World Championships. In 2007, she took the bronze medal at the Long Distance Triathlon World Championships in Lorient. She won the World Powerman Duathlon Long Distance Championships in 2007 and 2008.

In 2010 in Edinburgh she took gold for a second time at the Duathlon World Championships in a time of 2:02:48.

Catriona's triathlon career wins include numerous Ironman 70.3 events including St Croix (4 times), UK, Galveston and Ironman titles including Ironman Texas and Ironman Lanzarote where she famously battled back from a 45min mechanical to win the event.

Catriona retired from professional triathlon and duathlon in January 2015. Since then she has completed the prestigious Saltire Fellowship - a fast track entrepreneurial programme based in Scotland and at Babson College in Boston. She is a lay member of court at the University of Stirling. Catriona is an athlete role model for "Winning Scotland Foundation" visiting schools and junior sports clubs to encourage, inspire and motivate young people through sport.

In the 2015 Birthday Honours, Morrison was appointed Member of the Order of the British Empire (MBE) for services to Sport and voluntary service in Scotland.

Catriona is co-founder of "Everactiv" a sports clothing brand for young people whose philosophy is to empower, motivate and inspire young people to be physically active.
