= Stephanie Forrester (triathlete) =

British triathlete from Aberdeen

Medal record

Representing Great Britain

Women's triathlon

ITU Duathlon World Championships
Gold medal – first place	2000 Calais	Individual

Stephanie Emma Forrester (born 30 April 1969) is a British triathlete from Aberdeen.

Forrester competed at the first Olympic triathlon at the 2000 Summer Olympics. She took 15th place with a total time of 2:03:56.11. That same year, Forrester took first place at the 2000 ITU Duathlon World Championships in Calais, France.

Following her athletic career, Forrester joined Loughborough University's Sports Technology Institute, where she is a Professor in Sports Engineering and Biomechanics.
