= Sandra Levenez =

French multi-sports athlete (born 1979)

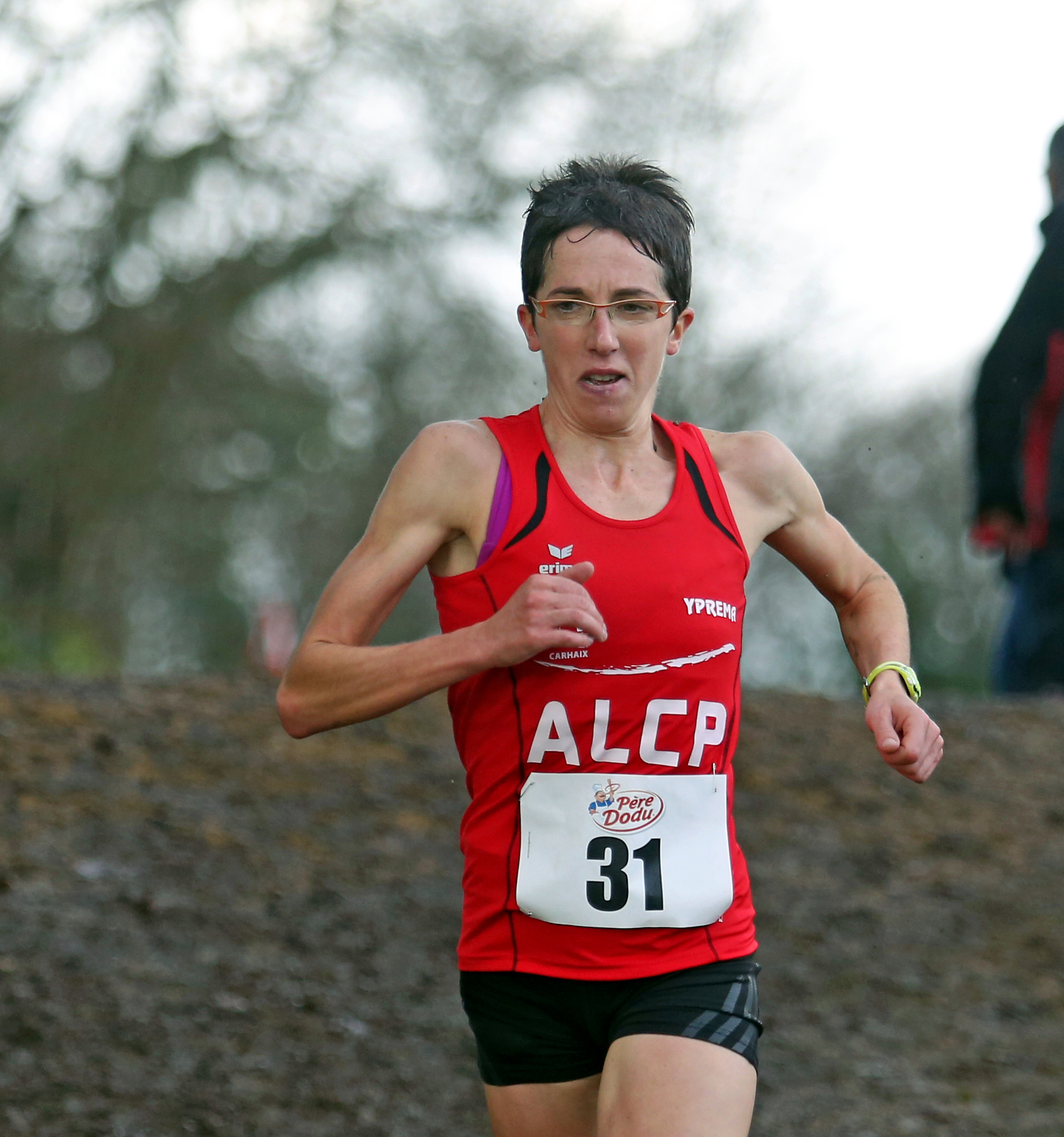
- Levenez in 2016

Personal information
- Nationality: French
- Born: 5 July 1979 (age 47) Carhaix-Plouguer, France
- Height: 1.57 m (5 ft 2 in)
- Weight: 44 kg (97 lb)

Sport
- Sport: Triathlon; Duathlon; Road cycling
- Cycling career
- Sport: Cycling
- Current team: Retired
- Discipline: Road
- Role: Rider

Amateur team
- 2018–2019: US Vern

Professional teams
- 2020–2021: Arkéa Pro Cycling Team
- 2022: Cofidis

Sandra Levenez (born 5 July 1979, in Carhaix-Plouguer) is a French triathlete, duathlete, and cyclist, She was selected to compete in the road race at the 2020 UCI Road World Championships. She is also a two time duathlon world champion as well as a four time European champion.

== Major results ==
2020
2nd La Périgord Ladies
4th Time trial, National Road Championships
5th Overall Tour Cycliste Féminin International de l'Ardèche
2021
10th La Périgord Ladies
