= Benny Vansteelant =

Belgian duathlete (1976–2007)

Personal information
- Nationality: Belgian
- Born: 19 November 1976 Torhout
- Died: 14 September 2007 (aged 30)

Sport
- Event: duathlon
- Updated on 8 June 2016

Benny Vansteelant (19 November 1976 – 14 September 2007) was a Belgian duathlete. For the first decade of the 21st century he was the uncontested icon of Duathlon, winning more than 80% of the races he started at.

== Life ==
He was born in Torhout. A book describing his early life and his rise to the top of the duathlon scene has been published in Dutch (ISBN 9789077941980 "Meneer Duatlon").

On 8 September 2007 Vansteelant was hit by a car during training on his bike. He suffered a broken leg, facial injuries, a torn spleen and damage to lungs and heart. In the days after the accident, he seemed to recover well and was getting close to leaving the intensive care section of the hospital in Roeselare on 13 September. But one day later, Vansteelant suffered a cardiac arrest. Despite receiving CPR in time, he died of a pulmonary embolism in the early morning.

Vansteelant's achievements included World Junior title in 1997, ITU World standard distance (10 km-40 km-10 km) champion in 2000, 2001, 2003, 2004, ITU World long distance champion in 2000, 2001, 2005, 2006 and ETU European champion in 1999, 2001, 2002, 2003, 2007. In 2001 he won all three titles in the same season. Vansteelant also won the Powerman Duathlon World long distance (10 km-150 km-30 km) championship in 2005 and 2006. He was awarded the 'Sport Jewel of Flanders' in 2003, Flanders' highest honour to award a sportsman.

Benny's younger brother, Joerie, has continued the Vansteelant tradition and has also had considerable success in elite Duathlon, including four world titles.

== Honours ==
- ITU World Championship Duathlon (standard distance):
  - Winner (4): 2000, 2001, 2003, 2004
- ITU World Championship Duathlon (long distance):
  - Winner (4): 2000, 2001, 2005, 2006
- ETU European Championship Duathlon:
  - Winner (5): 1999, 2001, 2002, 2003, 2007
- Powerman World Championship Duathlon:
  - Winner (2): 2005, 2006
