= Felicity Sheedy-Ryan =

Australian triathlete

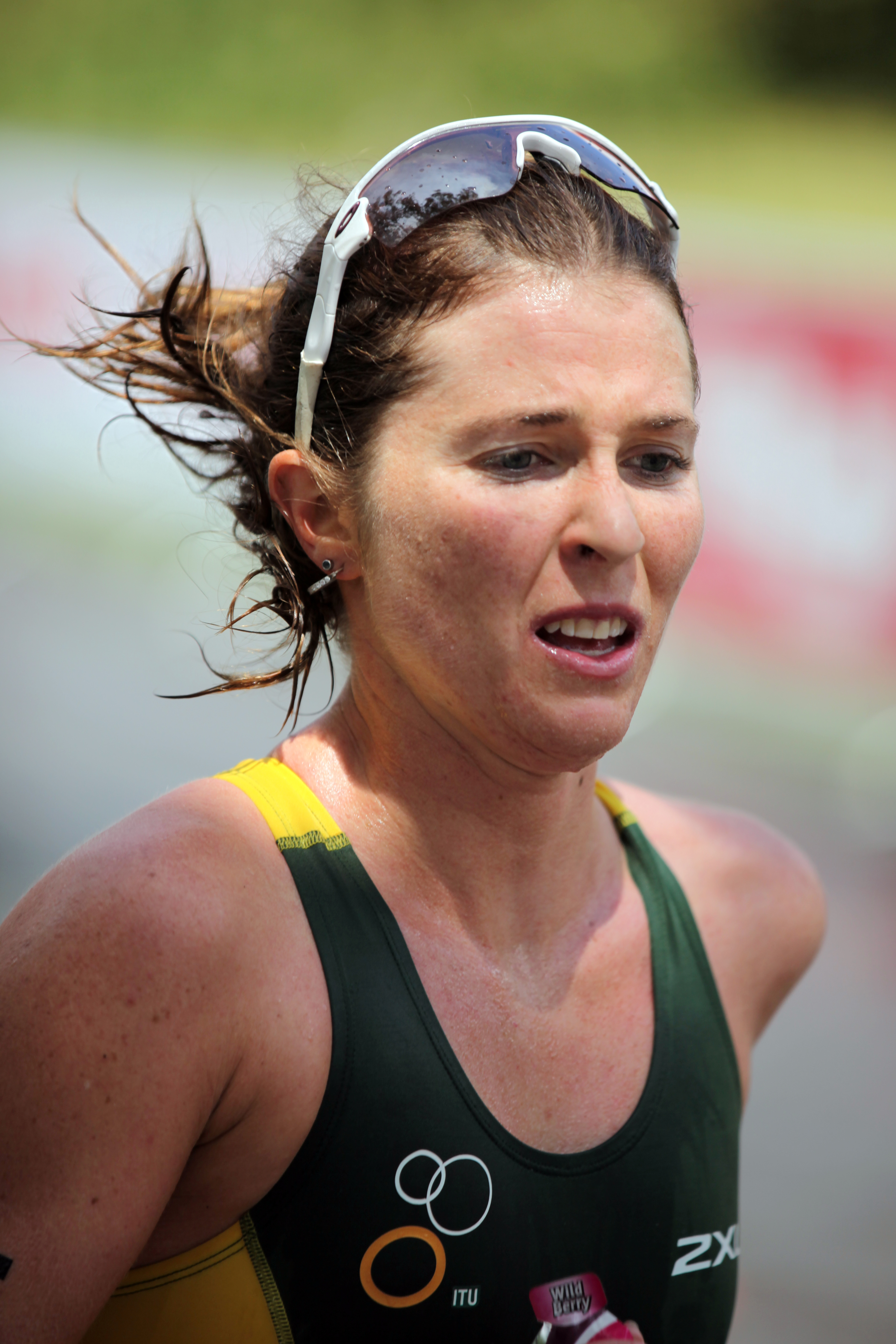
Felicity Sheedy-Ryan at the World Championship Series triathlon in Kitzbühel, 2011.

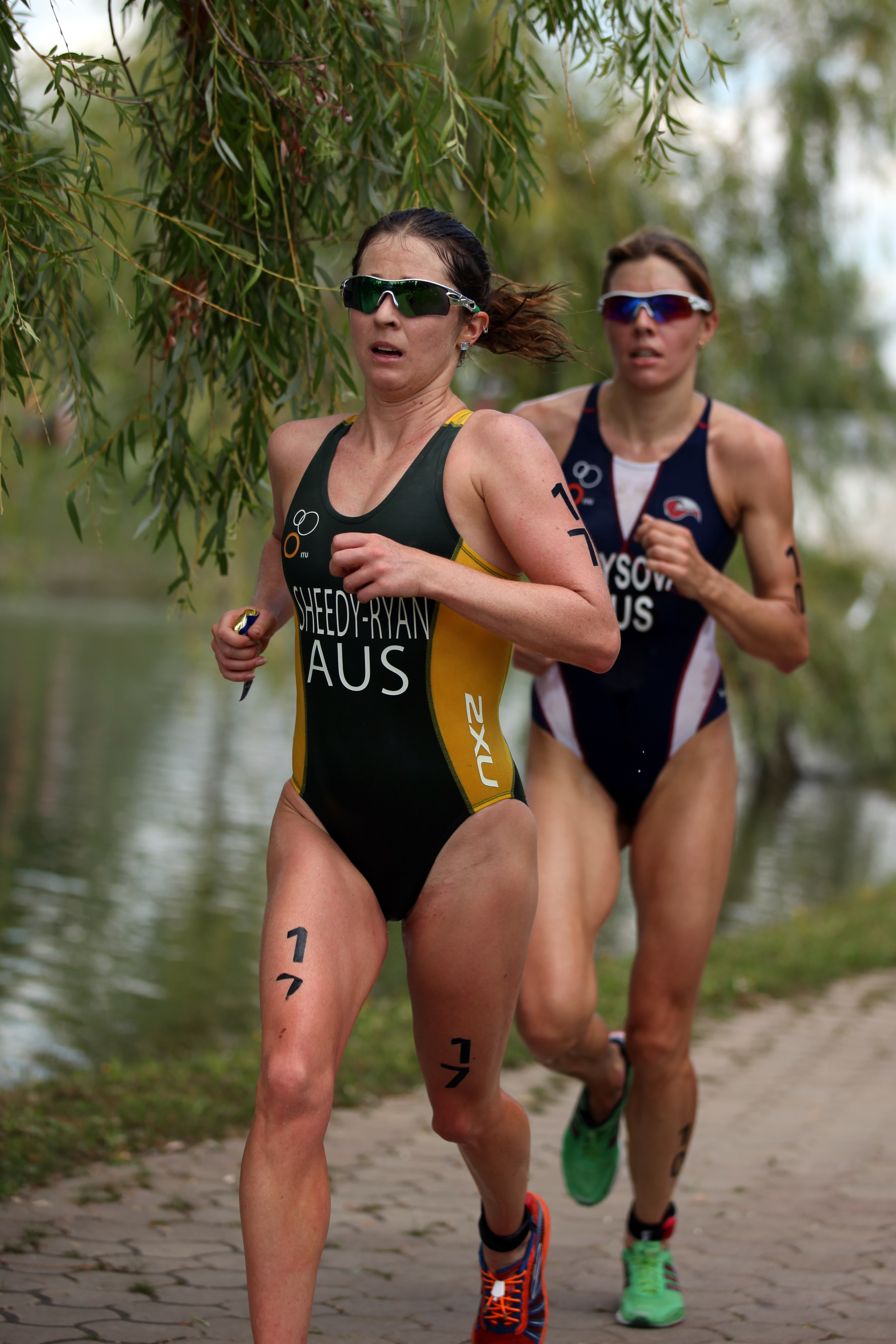
Felicity Sheedy-Ryan at the World Cup triathlon in Tiszaújváros, 2011.

Felicity Sheedy-Ryan (born 12 February 1985 in Perth) is an Australian professional triathlete, Oceania Champion of the year 2008, gold medalist at the 2012 and 2017 Duathlon World Championships, and a member of the Australian World Championship Series Team 2011.

== Sports career ==
Sheedy-Ryan started her national career as a member of the UWA (University of Western Australia) Triathlon Club and is a member of the WA Institute of Sport.

In 2011, Sheedy-Ryan decided to participate for the first time in a Long Distance race and won the silver medal at Busselton 70.3 Half Ironman.

Sheedy-Ryan also takes part in the prestigious French Club Championship Series Lyonnaise des Eaux and represents the club Stade Poitevin Tri. At Dunkirk (22 May 2011) she placed 14th, at Paris (9 July 2011) 10th, thus being the best female triathlete of her club.

Sheedy-Ryan lives in Wembley, a suburb of Perth, and in France. Her coach is Grant Landers.

== ITU competitions ==
In the five years from 2006 to 2010, Sheedy-Ryan took part in 22 ITU competitions and achieved 10 top ten positions. In 2011, she won two gold medals at the European Cup in Geneva and the Premium European Cup in Banyoles. She also represents Australia in the World Championship Series.

The following list is based upon the official ITU rankings and the ITU Athletes's Profile Page. Unless indicated otherwise, the following events are triathlons (Olympic Distance) and refer to the Elite category.

| Date | Competition | Place | Rank |
|---|---|---|---|
| 2006-04-16 | Oceania Championships | Geelong | 11 |
| 2007-02-04 | Oceania Championships (U23) | Penrith | 2 |
| 2007-05-20 | Pan American Cup | Honolulu | 18 |
| 2007-06-24 | Asian Cup | Gamagori | 7 |
| 2007-07-01 | Asian Cup | Shichigahama | 3 |
| 2008-03-01 | Oceania Cup | Gold Coast | 15 |
| 2008-03-09 | Oceania Championships (U23) | Wellington | 1 |
| 2008-07-12 | European Cup | Athlone | 3 |
| 2008-07-20 | BG World Cup | Kitzbühel | 27 |
| 2009-03-15 | Oceania Cup | Perth | 3 |
| 2009-07-18 | European Cup | Athlone | 1 |
| 2009-08-09 | World Cup | Tiszaújváros | 3 |
| 2009-08-15 | Dextro Energy World Championship Series | London | 30 |
| 2009-09-09 | Dextro Energy World Championship Series: Grand Final | Gold Coast | 20 |
| 2010-03-27 | World Cup | Mooloolaba | 13 |
| 2010-04-11 | Dextro Energy World Championship Series | Sydney | 28 |
| 2010-06-05 | Dextro Energy World Championship Series | Madrid | 36 |
| 2010-07-10 | World Cup | Holten | 4 |
| 2010-07-24 | Dextro Energy World Championship Series | London | DNF |
| 2010-08-08 | World Cup | Tiszaújváros | 46 |
| 2010-08-21 | Sprint World Championships | Lausanne | 21 |
| 2010-09-03 | Duathlon World Championships | Edinburgh | 3 |
| 2011-03-12 | Oceania Championships | Wellington | 8 |
| 2011-04-09 | Dextro Energy World Championship Series | Sydney | 41 |
| 2011-06-04 | Dextro Energy World Championship Series | Madrid | 46 |
| 2011-06-18 | Dextro Energy World Championship Series | Kitzbühel | 54 |
| 2011-07-24 | European Cup | Geneva | 1 |
| 2011-07-31 | Premium European Cup | Banyoles | 1 |
| 2011-08-14 | World Cup | Tiszaújváros | 4 |
| 2011-08-20 | Dextro Energy World Championship Series: Sprint World Championships | Lausanne | 33 |

DNF = did not finish · DNS = did not start · BG = the sponsor British Gas
