= Duathlon =

Running and cycling athletic event

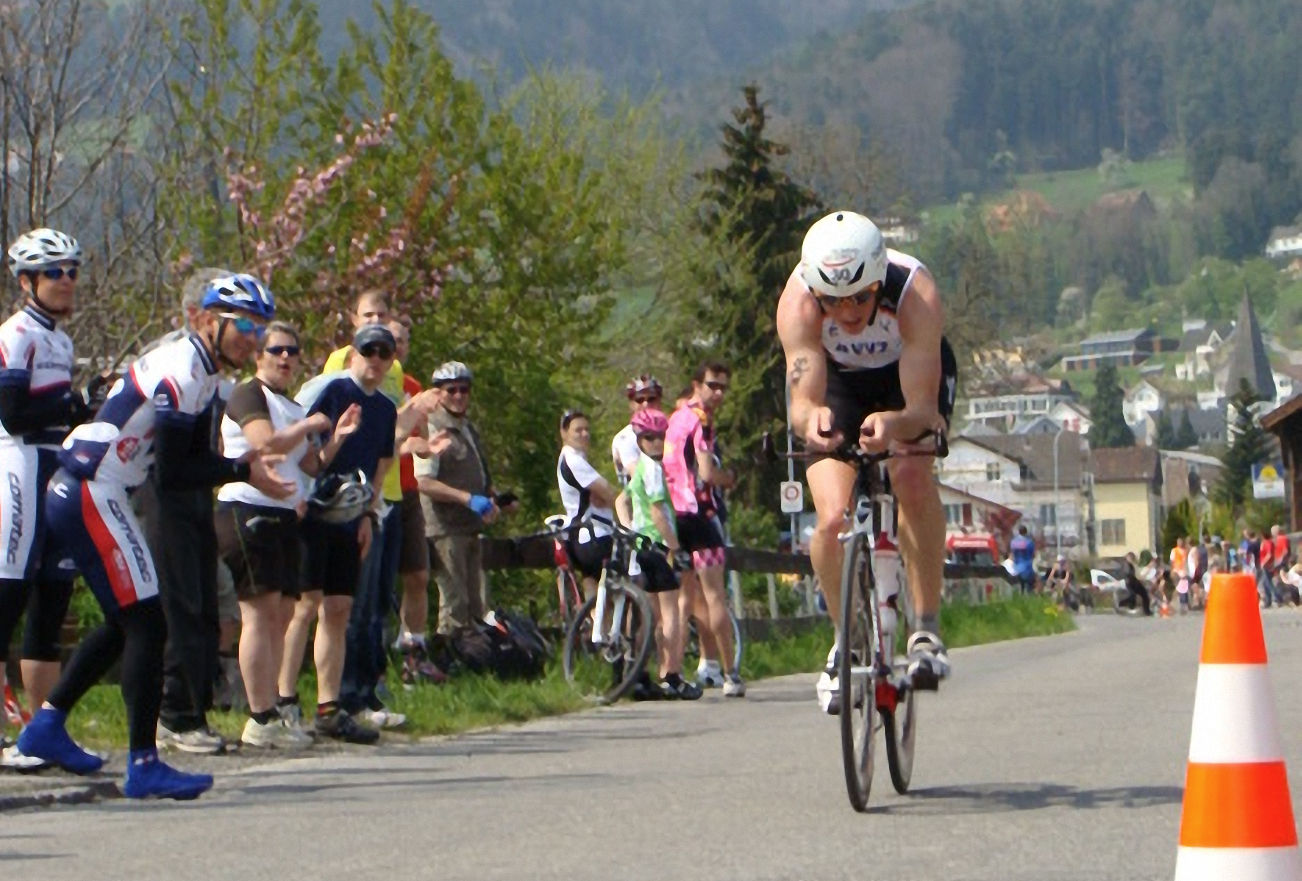
- Rheintal Duathlon April 2010
- Highest governing body: World Triathlon
- First contested: 20th century

Characteristics
- Contact: No
- Mixed-sex: No
- Type: Endurance sport
- Equipment: Bicycle

Presence
- Country or region: Worldwide
- Olympic: No
- World Games: 2013 (invitational), 2022, 2025

Duathlon, 2014

Duathlon is an athletic event that consists of a running leg, followed by a cycling leg and then another running leg in a format similar to triathlons. The World Triathlon governs the sport internationally.

== Distance and format ==
Duathlons are conducted at sprint, standard, middle and long distances. The following distances are considered typical for the sport; however, individual races may vary.

- Sprint distance - 5 km run, 20 km bike, 2.5 km run
- Standard distance - 10 km run, 40 km bike, 5 km run
- Middle distance - 10 km run, 60 km bike, 10 km run
- Long distance - 10 km run, 150 km bike, 30 km run

=== Off-road duathlon ===
Off-road duathlon is a form of duathlon, where the competitors have to go through a trail-running stage and a mountain-biking stage, finishing with a final running stage. Off-road duathlons are distinguished from conventional duathlons in that the terrain for the cycling and running stages are generally unpaved, rough, and very steep and hilly. They require different techniques than conventional duathlon races, and the athletes employ mountain bikes rather than road bikes.

== Relationships to similar sports ==
Duathlons are most similar to triathlons, with the key difference being the replacement of the swimming leg with a second run. Other sports derived from triathlon include aquathlon, which combines swimming and running but has omitted the cycling part, and aquabike, with the swim and bike and no run.

The word duathlon is also used for some events which comprise running or walking and cycling, but not in three stages, such as the annual Highland Cross in Scotland. The word duathlon does not appear in the online Oxford English Dictionary as of March 2020, nor in the 11th edition (2008) of Chambers Dictionary, but a definition available online from Collins English Dictionary defines it as "an athletic contest in which each athlete competes in running and cycling events" without specifying the three-stage structure of the International Triathlon Union's definition.

== Team duathlon ==
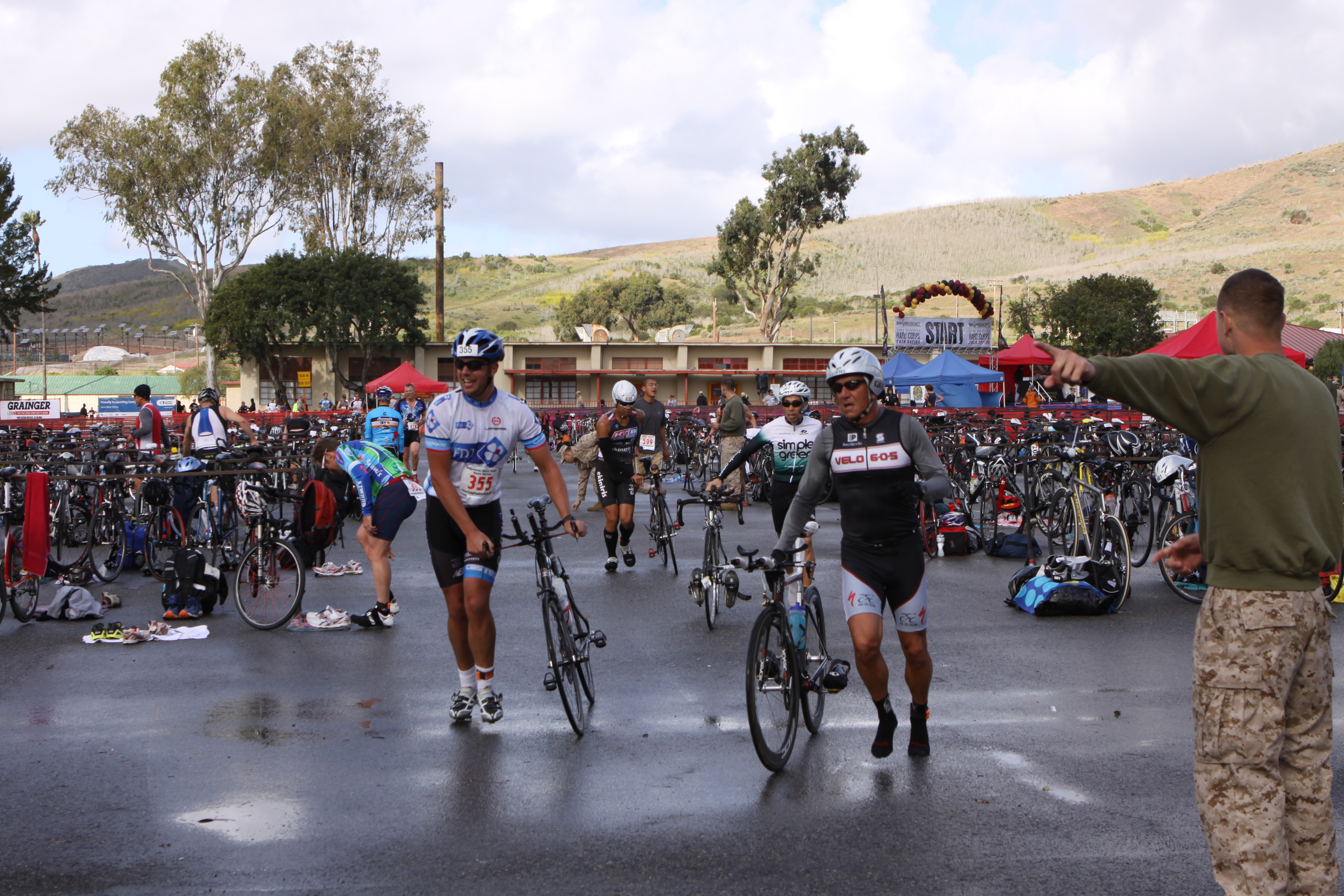
The run-bike transition zone at a duathlon

In this variation, the cycling and running segments need to be undertaken simultaneously by a team consisting of a predetermined number of individuals. Only one of the team members is running while all others are cycling. All the members of a team must be together at any given point of time but exchanging the tasks of running and cycling amongst the team members themselves is permitted.

The challenge is to rotate the task of running at an optimum rate such that the time from start to destination is minimized. This demands a smooth coordination amongst all team members which makes the sport more exciting. An example is the 100 km-Duathlon around Dresden which is the oldest of its kind in Germany.

== Notable duathlons ==
World Triathlon organizes the World Triathlon Duathlon Championships on a yearly basis since 1990. Since 2017, it has been part of the World Triathlon Multisport World Championships although it was run as a separate event again in 2021, as the Multisport World Championships was cancelled.

Powerman Duathlon is a major run bike run brand in the world. The Powerman Duathlon World Series is the major international duathlon series with 10-20 middle to long distance races across the globe each year. The series incorporates National, Continental and World Championships as well as numerous series races awarding points to crown an overall series winner at the end of the season after the world championships in September.

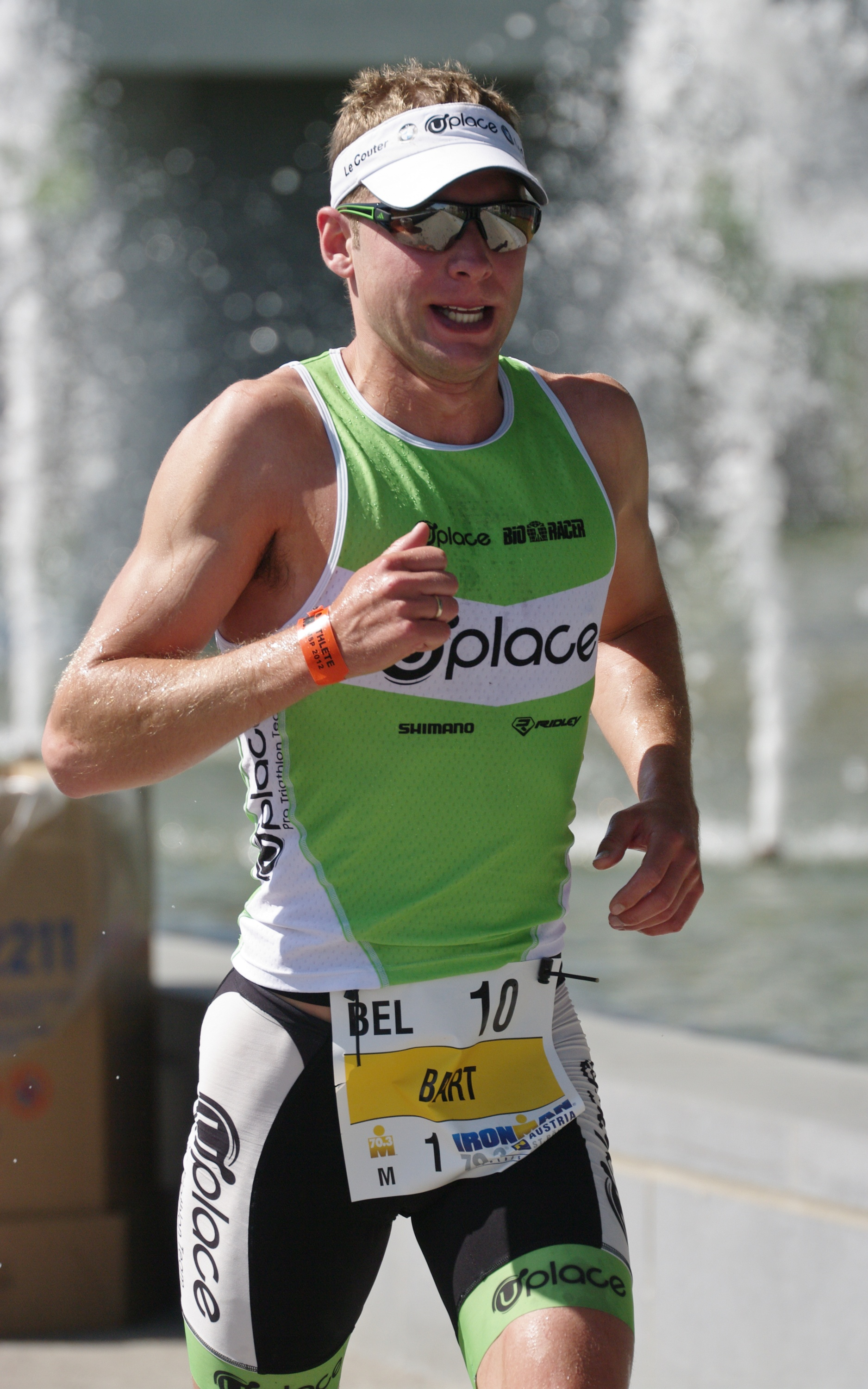
Bart Aernouts, 2013 European duathlon champion

The world's largest duathlon to date is the inaugural London Duathlon, which took place on 17 September 2005 in Richmond Park, Surrey. Approximately 2,500 people took part. The main race consisted of a 10 km (6.2 mi) run, 20 km (12 mi) cycle ride and 5 km (3.1 mi) run. Since 2005 London Duathlon has grown to just under 4,000 participants. 2010 saw the first running of the Ultra Distance at London which will consisted of 20 km (12 mi) run, 77 km (48 mi) bike and 10 km (6.2 mi) run. In its ninth year, London Duathlon took place on Sunday 14 September 2014 and offered athletes of all abilities the chance to race through the stunning surroundings of Richmond Park while on closed roads. "Classic" distance consists of a 10 km (6.2 mi) run, 44 km (27 mi) cycle ride and 5 km (3.1 mi) run.

The World's premier duathlon is Powerman Zofingen, in Switzerland. It is a hilly 10 km (6.2 mi) run, mostly on trails, followed by a very hilly 150 km (93 mi) road bike consisting of three, 50 km (31 mi) loops each of which feature the Bodenburg ascent (scene of Kenny Souza's DNF in a snow storm when he raced in a neon Speedo and small tank top), and finally a very hilly 30 km (19 mi) two loop trail run.

The longest continually running duathlon series is still organized by the NY Triathlon Club in and around New York City, US.

With the popularity of extreme sports, a new form of duathlon has become popular in the last few years. Referred to as an off-road duathlon, or "Dirty-Du", it consists of an off-road or trail run, followed by a mountain bike leg followed by a final off-road or trail run. The Dirty Du off-road duathlon series, held in Texas, was made famous by Lance Armstrong, who won it in 2003.

== Notable duathletes ==
=== Men ===
- Kenny Souza – 1990 ITU world champion
- Jonas Deichmann – a German extreme athlete who crossed North America in a 11,000 km duathlon, cycling from New York to Los Angeles and running back.
- Benny Vansteelant – winner of the World Duathlon, World Long-Distance Duathlon, European Duathlon and numerous Powerman titles.
- Joerie Vansteelant – winner of the World Long-Distance Duathlon 2007
- Koen Maris – 2007 Powerman Duathlon World Champion (10 km/150 km/30 km)
- Rob Woestenborghs – 2008 World Champion Duathlon Short Distance in Rimini
- Bart Aernouts – 2010 World Champion Duathlon Short Distance in Edinburgh
- Emilio Martin – 2012 World Champion Duathlon Short Distance in Nancy
- Gaël Le Bellec – 2014, 2015 and 2018 ITU LD World Champion

=== Women ===
- Catriona Morrison – 2006 and 2010 World Duathlon Champion, 2007 and 2008 World Long-Distance Duathlon Champion, 2007 and 2009 European Duathlon Champion
- Emma Pooley – 2014, 2015, 2016, 2017 ITU LD World Champion, 2017 European MD Champion
- Georgia Bell - 2023 World Duathlon Champion, 2024 Olympic 1500 m bronze medallist
- Maddy Tormoen - 1993, 1995 Zofingen World Duathlon Long Distance Champion (10 km, 150 km, 30 km)
