= World Triathlon =

International triathlon governing body

- Sport: Triathlon
- Abbreviation: TRI
- Founded: 1 April 1989; 37 years ago in Avignon, France
- Headquarters: Lausanne, Switzerland
- President: Antonio Fernández Arimany

Official website
- www.triathlon.org

World Triathlon, previously known as the International Triathlon Union (ITU), is the international governing body for the multi-sport discipline of triathlon, its associated multi-sport disciplines of duathlon, aquathlon and other nonstandard variations. It is recognised as the international federation for the sport of triathlon and its derivatives by the International Olympic Committee, and it organises Olympic triathlon events on behalf of the IOC.

In addition to regulating and setting the rules of the sport, World Triathlon organises the top level international race series the World Triathlon Championship Series and the ITU Triathlon World Cup. Starting in 2024, World Triathlon also sanctions and recognises a World Championship Tour of Long-Distance Triathlon organised by the Professional Triathletes Organisation. World Triathlon does not have an official relationship with the other three major commercial triathlon circuits, Ironman Triathlon, XTERRA Triathlon or Super League Triathlon.

Additionally, World Triathlon regulated, sanctions and organizes official sprint distance and team relay triathlon championships, as well as Aquathlon (run-swim-run), Duathlon (run-bike-run) and Winter triathlon championships.

World Triathlon is headquartered in Lausanne, Switzerland.

== History ==
Versions of swim bike run multi-sports existed in the 1920s, but it wasn't until the term triathlon was coined in 1974 in San Diego that triathlon exploded in popularity. This rapid development drew the attention of the International Olympic Committee (IOC), which initiated a discussion in 1988 to include it in the Olympic Games program. The then IOC President Juan Antonio Samaranch held a meeting in Stockholm, Sweden, with the intention of making triathlon an Olympic sport as soon as possible. At that meeting Canadian Les McDonald was selected as President to a working committee for triathlon, while Sweden's Sture Jonasson was elected as Secretary.

World Triathlon was founded as the International Triathlon Union (ITU) one year later, on April 1, 1989, at the first ITU Congress in Avignon, France. A total of 30 National Federations attended the initial Congress and preparations were made for the sport's first World Championships to be held in Avignon in August 1989. At this meeting the Olympic distance (later renamed to standard) was set at a 1.5-km swim, 40-km bike and 10-km run the distances were chosen as they were already present at the Olympics for each discipline individually. More than 800 athletes representing 40 countries competed in the first World Championships, and Canada's Les McDonald was elected as ITU's first president in 1989.

ITU began the World Cup series in 1991, staging 11 races in eight countries. Triathlon was officially added to the Olympic Programme by the IOC at its Congress in Paris in 1994. Triathlon made its Olympic debut at the 2000 Games in Sydney.

Since its inception World Triathlon has maintained its headquarters in Vancouver, Canada until January 1, 2014 when it moved to Lausanne, Switzerland, home of the IOC and many international sporting bodies.

In August 2025, Tauranga, New Zealand, was confirmed as host city of the 2028 World Triathlon Championship Final in a three-year partnership with World Triathlon, culminating in the elite World Triathlon Championship Final, Age Group World Championships, Para triathlon World Championships, and World Triathlon Congress coming to the heart of Bay of Plenty in November 2028.

== International structure ==
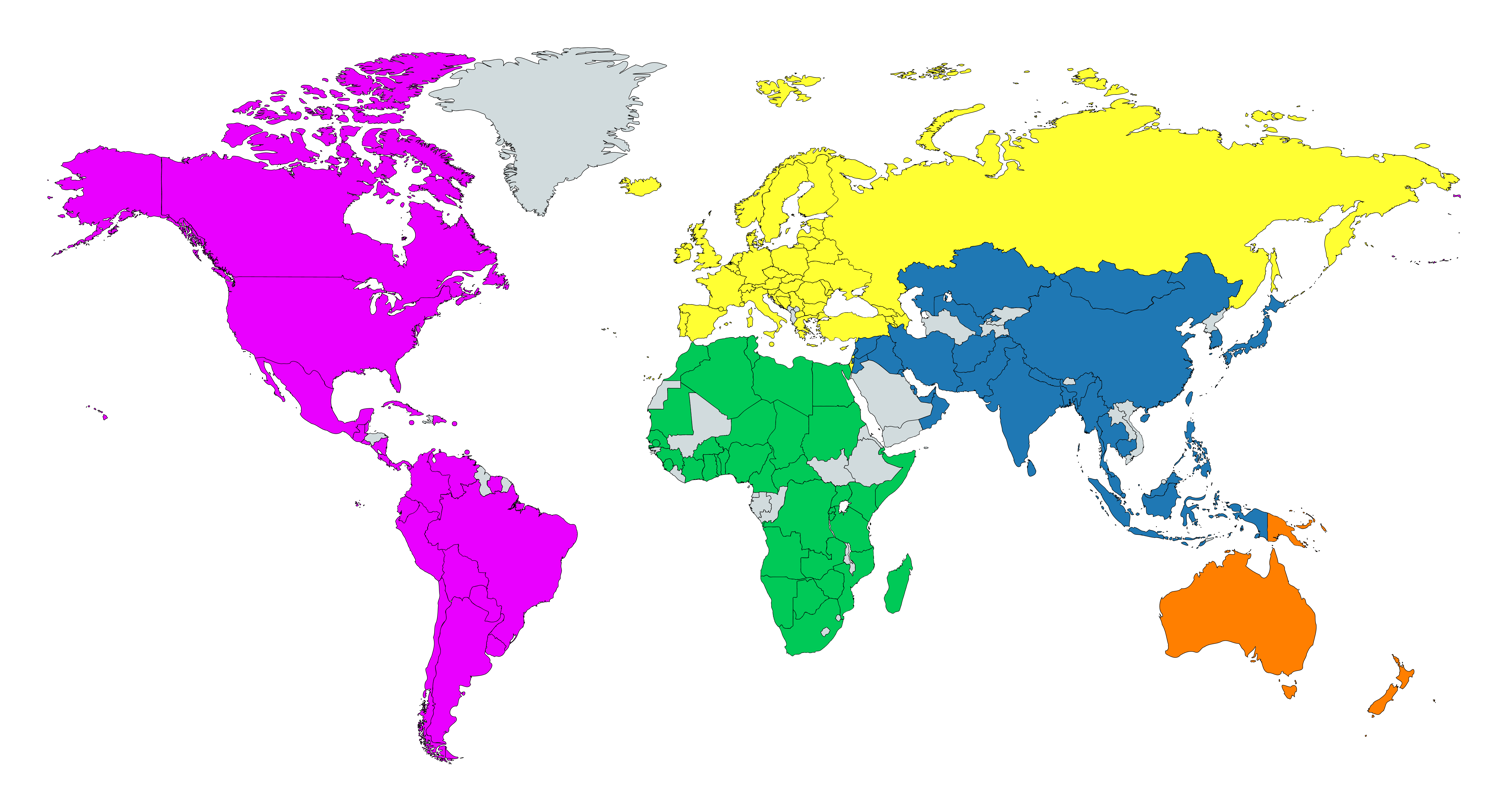
Map of world with five continental regions

World Triathlon is structured into 5 continental regions, through which 172 national federations (the governing body of triathlon in each country) are affiliated to World Triathlon. Each region offers a Continental Championship and Continental Cup Series.

Asia Triathlon representing 35 national federations
Africa Triathlon representing 37 national federations
Europe Triathlon representing 46 national federations
Americas Triathlon representing 40 national federations
Oceania Triathlon representing 14 national federations

=== Russian suspension ===
In response to the 2022 Russian invasion of Ukraine, Europe Triathlon said that it strongly supported the decision of the International Olympic Committee and World Triathlon to exclude Russian and Belarusian athletes and officials from organised European events, and to not organise international events in Russia or Belarus.

In April 2026, the Executive Board of World Triathlon has decided to allow Russian junior and youth athletes, as well as para-athletes, to participate in international competitions in the respective categories under their national flag, with the national anthem, and with full national insignia.

== Development ==
World Triathlon has an ongoing effort to develop the sport especially outside of Europe and English speaking countries. One method is through development grants such as the recent one to the African Triathlon Union, with most of the money to national federations allowing for support of organize events, as well as funding for athlete, coach and Technical Officials courses. Another is athlete scholarships to be given to young athletes that have shown talent but who need more support than their developing National Federation can give, allowing them to perform at an international level, the end goal of these scholarships is the athletes performing for their county at the Olympic games. One global development is the introduction of certifications for coaching and technical officials meaning that important events will be contested at the high level.

== Ranking system ==
World Triathlon publishes and maintains the World Rankings for the men's and women's competitions in both short and long course for triathlon and duathlon as well as aquathlon and winter triathlon races it also has a ranking for the national teams mixed relay. Each ranking has a slightly different point system but all are calculated via a rolling calendar, by taking a set number of the highest scoring results from the previous 52 weeks and adding them to a set number of the highest scoring results from the 53 to 104 weeks previous. Each races maximum score is decided by the ITU's ranking criteria and then the athlete who comes first will earn that many points with each following athlete earning 7.5% less point than the athlete before them.

== Championships ==
The world championship events organised by World Triathlon include:

- In triathlon:
  - World Triathlon Championship Series
  - World Triathlon Long Distance Championships
  - World Triathlon Sprint Distance Championships
  - World Triathlon Mixed Relay Championships
  - World Triathlon Cup
- In duathlon
  - World Triathlon Duathlon Championships
  - World Triathlon Long Distance Duathlon Championships
- In aquathlon:
  - World Triathlon Aquathlon Championships
- In winter triathlon:
  - World Triathlon Winter Championships
- In triathlon cross
  - World Triathlon Cross Championships
