= 1998 ITU Triathlon World Championships =

The 1998 ITU Triathlon World Championships was a triathlon event held in Lausanne, Switzerland on 29–30 August 1998 and organised by the International Triathlon Union. The championship was won by Simon Lessing of Great Britain and Joanne King of Australia.

== Course ==
The course was a 1.5 kilometres (0.93 mi) swim, 40 kilometres (25 mi) bike, 10 kilometres (6.2 mi) run. The swim took place in Lake Geneva, starting next to the de Coubertin sporting complex. The bike course was a four lap course through the city, including a climb past the Lausanne Cathedral. The run was an out and back course, passing the Olympic Museum.

== Results ==
=== Men's Championship ===
Rank	Name	Swim	T1	Bike	T2	Run	Time
Gold medal	Simon Lessing (GBR)	17:43	1:21	1:04:19	0:51	31:14	1:55:30
Silver medal	Paul Amey (GBR)	18:11	1:25	1:03:47	0:50	31:43	1:55:57
Bronze medal	Miles Stewart (AUS)	18:14	1:28	1:03:35	0:52	31:54	1:56:04
4	Hamish Carter (NZL)	17:41	1:23	1:04:13	0:47	32:02	1:56:08
5	Martin Krnavek (CZE)	17:50	1:31	1:03:58	0:51	32:01	1:56:14
6	Dmitriy Gaag (KAZ)	17:53	1:26	1:04:05	0:51	32:02	1:56:20
7	Jean-Christophe Guinchard (SUI)	17:55	1:23	1:03:58	0:46	32:32	1:56:38
8	Olivier Marceau (SUI)	18:20	1:20	1:03:40	0:54	32:23	1:56:40
9	Reto Hug (SUI)	17:57	1:23	1:04:02	0:56	32:29	1:56:49
10	Andrew Johns (GBR)	18:11	1:20	1:03:47	0:57	32:35	1:56:52
11	Chris Hill (AUS)	17:44	1:23	1:04:09	0:51	32:43	1:56:53
12	Chris McCormack (AUS)	18:19	1:25	1:03:34	0:54	32:49	1:57:04
13	Trent Chapman (AUS)	18:13	1:21	1:03:45	0:48	33:10	1:57:19
14	Marc Jenkins (GBR)	17:57	1:26	1:04:02	0:54	33:02	1:57:23
15	Greg Bennett (USA)	18:13	1:23	1:03:40	0:51	33:16	1:57:26
16	Jan Rehula (CZE)	17:48	1:28	1:04:04	0:56	33:16	1:57:32
18	Eric van der Linden (NED)	18:01	1:23	1:04:00	0:57	33:45	1:58:09
19	Markus Keller (SUI)	17:53	1:26	1:03:58	0:51	34:25	1:58:37
20	Joachim Willen (SWE)	18:04	1:23	1:03:57	0:53	34:59	1:59:19
21	Hideo Fukui (JPN)	17:48	1:31	1:04:02	0:52	35:04	1:59:19
22	Stefano Belandi (ITA)	18:12	1:25	1:06:12	0:57	32:35	1:59:24
23	Wes Hobson (USA)	18:09	1:21	1:03:52	0:59	35:10	1:59:32
24	Ryan Bolton (USA)	18:45	1:30	1:05:31	0:51	32:54	1:59:36
25	Volodymyr Polikarpenko (UKR)	18:00	1:25	1:06:27	0:54	32:47	1:59:37
26	Christoph Mauch (SUI)	19:45	1:20	1:04:38	0:51	33:06	1:59:42
27	Dominik Rechsteiner (SUI)	19:04	1:25	1:04:28	0:56	33:54	1:59:48
28	Jamie Hunt (NZL)	18:50	1:22	1:05:38	0:50	33:16	1:59:59
29	Csaba Kuttor (HUN)	18:11	1:30	1:06:07	0:57	33:16	2:00:04
30	Alessandro Bottoni (ITA)	18:52	1:27	1:05:30	0:56	33:19	2:00:05
31	Arnd Schomburg (GER)	18:22	1:30	1:03:30	0:54	35:49	2:00:10
32	Jim Riccitello (USA)	19:14	1:29	1:04:17	1:02	34:22	2:00:26
33	Craig Watson (NZL)	00:00	0:00	0:00:00	0:00	00:00	2:00:37
34	Conrad Stoltz (RSA)	18:56	1:30	1:05:17	0:54	33:59	2:00:40
35	Marcel Vifian (USA)	18:58	1:27	1:05:19	0:52	34:10	2:00:46
36	Arturo Garza (MEX)	19:18	1:30	1:04:56	0:58	34:02	2:00:48
37	Jean Sebastian Leuba (SUI)	18:06	1:23	1:03:47	0:54	36:35	2:00:48
38	Eneko Llanos (ESP)	18:32	1:25	1:05:48	0:52	34:13	2:00:52
39	Philippe Fattori (FRA)	18:33	1:28	1:05:45	0:54	34:28	2:01:10
40	Dennis Looze (NED)	18:21	1:23	1:06:03	0:59	34:27	2:01:16
41	Richard Allen (GBR)	18:33	1:25	1:05:48	0:53	34:45	2:01:25
42	Matias Brain (CHI)	18:56	1:26	1:05:30	0:54	34:37	2:01:25
43	Junichi Yamamoto (JPN)	18:23	1:29	1:05:56	0:57	34:48	2:01:34
44	Stephane Poulat (FRA)	17:42	1:25	1:06:37	0:59	34:52	2:01:36
45	Samuel Pierreclaud (FRA)	00:00	0:00	0:00:00	0:00	00:00	2:01:44
46	Stefan Vuckovic (GER)	18:48	1:27	1:04:42	0:51	36:02	2:01:51
47	Ricky Jorgensen (DEN)	17:51	1:31	1:06:26	0:59	35:19	2:02:10
48	Takumi Obara (JPN)	18:53	1:23	1:05:30	0:56	35:32	2:02:17
49	Leandro Macedo (BRA)	19:07	1:35	1:07:30	0:52	33:28	2:02:35
50	Jan Hansen (DEN)	19:01	1:26	1:07:31	0:54	33:44	2:02:38
51	Markus Forster (GER)	19:33	1:27	1:07:12	0:48	34:01	2:03:04
52	Péter Hóbor (HUN)	19:00	1:35	1:07:41	0:58	34:15	2:03:29
53	Marcus Ornellas (BRA)	18:58	1:27	1:07:49	0:59	34:22	2:03:36
54	Motofumi Kojima (JPN)	19:19	1:30	1:07:26	1:00	34:53	2:04:13
55	Jose Luis Zepeda (MEX)	18:15	1:44	1:08:20	1:07	34:53	2:04:21
56	Vasilis Krommidas (GRE)	18:36	1:30	1:07:53	1:00	35:29	2:04:31
57	Leonardo Nolasco (MEX)	19:33	1:25	1:07:01	0:54	35:51	2:04:47
58	Lieuw Boonstra (RSA)	19:17	1:29	1:07:26	0:58	35:54	2:05:05
59	Jose Merchan (ESP)	18:33	1:29	1:08:14	1:04	36:16	2:05:39
60	Eligio Cervantes (MEX)	18:58	1:28	1:09:54	0:54	34:37	2:05:54
61	Abe Rogers (USA)	18:59	1:23	1:09:56	0:56	34:58	2:06:14
62	Stephan Sheldrake (NED)	18:08	1:33	1:06:09	0:57	39:52	2:06:42
63	Scott Forbes (GBR)	19:31	1:29	1:07:14	0:58	37:40	2:06:54
64	Andrew Kelsey (USA)	18:57	1:28	1:09:56	0:54	36:14	2:07:31
65	David Hyam (RSA)	18:21	1:23	1:08:16	0:58	38:38	2:07:38
66	Hideo Nakagome (JPN)	18:34	1:35	1:08:06	0:54	39:00	2:08:14
67	Raul Lemir (ARG)	18:33	1:37	1:11:48	1:06	37:35	2:10:44
68	Andriy Glushchenko (UKR)	18:10	1:33	1:16:19	1:18	35:04	2:12:25
69	Francisco Javier Marco (ESP)	18:10	1:37	1:18:37	1:02	38:25	2:17:54

=== Women's Championship ===
Rank	Name	Swim	T1	Bike	T2	Run	Time
Gold medal	Joanne King (AUS)	20:00	1:26	1:09:16	0:57	35:43	2:07:24
Silver medal	Michellie Jones (AUS)	19:40	1:28	1:09:32	0:56	36:24	2:08:03
Bronze medal	Evelyn Williamson (NZL)	19:53	1:31	1:09:16	0:59	36:30	2:08:12
4	Loretta Harrop (AUS)	19:31	1:34	1:09:38	0:59	37:16	2:09:00
5	Isabelle Mouthon-Michellys (FRA)	19:42	1:23	1:09:35	1:02	37:25	2:09:10
6	Jackie Gallagher (AUS)	20:18	1:44	1:10:47	1:05	35:49	2:09:44
7	Barbara Lindquist (USA)	19:05	1:23	1:10:14	0:57	38:34	2:10:15
8	Susan Bartholomew (USA)	19:37	1:36	1:09:26	0:59	38:49	2:10:30
9	Mieke Suys (BEL)	20:17	1:31	1:10:58	1:02	36:52	2:10:43
10	Natascha Badmann (SUI)	21:22	1:34	1:09:49	0:58	37:17	2:11:03
11	Wieke Hoogzaad (NED)	20:38	1:39	1:10:29	1:02	37:37	2:11:29
12	Anja Dittmer (GER)	20:18	1:30	1:10:56	1:02	38:19	2:12:09
13	Stephanie Forrester (GBR)	20:24	1:30	1:12:59	0:59	36:31	2:12:25
14	Kathleen Smet (BEL)	19:46	1:37	1:11:25	1:00	38:43	2:12:33
15	Siri Lindley (USA)	19:46	1:31	1:11:55	0:59	38:20	2:12:35
16	Erika Molnár (HUN)	20:45	1:43	1:12:25	1:10	36:39	2:12:45
17	Jasmine Haemmerle (AUT)	20:44	1:39	1:12:28	0:57	36:57	2:12:49
18	Francisca Ruessli (SUI)	20:11	1:30	1:08:58	0:56	41:13	2:12:52
19	Nina Anisimova (RUS)	19:31	1:45	1:12:00	1:13	38:23	2:12:53
20	Suzanne Nielsen (DEN)	20:19	1:41	1:12:56	1:00	36:59	2:12:58
21	Gail Laurence (USA)	19:48	1:39	1:09:15	1:04	41:16	2:13:03
22	Silvia Pepels (NED)	19:36	1:42	1:11:27	0:59	39:27	2:13:14
23	Christine Hocq (FRA)	19:42	1:42	1:11:25	0:59	39:43	2:13:33
24	Rina Hill (AUS)	19:30	1:37	1:13:48	1:06	37:43	2:13:44
25	Sibylle Matter (SUI)	20:08	1:44	1:10:53	1:00	40:16	2:14:04
26	Nóra Edöcsény (HUN)	20:01	1:47	1:13:08	1:02	38:11	2:14:12
27	Maribel Blanco (ESP)	20:52	1:44	1:13:35	0:58	37:35	2:14:45
28	Haruna Hosoya (JPN)	21:14	1:27	1:12:12	0:59	38:55	2:14:47
29	Sian Brice (GBR)	19:56	1:45	1:13:14	1:02	38:55	2:14:55
30	Sharon Donnelly (CAN)	19:45	1:39	1:14:49	0:57	37:46	2:14:58
31	Lucienne Groenendijk (NED)	20:49	1:37	1:13:46	1:02	38:02	2:15:19
32	Ingrid van Lubek (NED)	21:23	1:30	1:14:00	1:04	37:45	2:15:45
33	Annie Emmerson (GBR)	21:33	1:50	1:13:34	1:04	37:50	2:15:54
34	Helene Salomon (FRA)	21:26	1:43	1:13:44	0:54	38:09	2:15:58
35	Kiyomi Niwata (JPN)	20:42	1:30	1:14:02	1:02	39:31	2:16:50
36	Beatrice Mouthon (FRA)	21:18	1:41	1:13:55	1:02	39:04	2:17:02
37	Manuela Ianesi (ITA)	20:14	1:43	1:14:19	1:05	39:55	2:17:17
38	Edith Cigana (ITA)	21:15	1:37	1:13:20	1:06	39:58	2:17:19
39	Yukie Koumegawa (JPN)	20:28	1:39	1:12:44	1:12	41:30	2:17:36
40	Magali Messmer (SUI)	19:38	1:37	1:14:57	0:58	40:33	2:17:45
41	Brigitte Mcmahon (SUI)	20:14	1:45	1:14:15	1:07	40:25	2:17:49
42	Nikolett Pécsi (HUN)	19:43	1:49	1:15:24	0:59	39:58	2:17:55
43	Machiko Nakanishi (JPN)	19:42	1:37	1:13:34	1:06	42:26	2:18:26
44	Francesca Tibaldi (ITA)	21:34	1:45	1:13:37	1:02	40:46	2:18:46
45	Jill Newman (USA)	21:21	1:47	1:11:48	1:02	43:17	2:19:20
46	Maria Morales (COL)	21:30	1:51	1:18:11	1:04	38:05	2:20:44
47	Lucy Smith (CAN)	25:20	1:34	1:15:56	1:02	36:57	2:20:53
48	Heidi Sessner (GER)	22:45	1:37	1:18:31	1:02	38:29	2:22:26
49	Simone Buerli (SUI)	20:48	1:42	1:18:08	1:05	41:51	2:23:36
50	Adriana Piacsek (BRA)	21:27	1:45	1:17:14	1:11	42:08	2:23:48
51	Silvia Gemignani (ITA)	19:35	1:54	1:20:52	1:17	41:42	2:25:21
52	Kim Carter (RSA)	20:42	1:39	1:21:15	1:13	40:37	2:25:29
53	Hiromi Ogawara (JPN)	21:22	1:45	1:19:11	1:08	42:59	2:26:27
54	Heidi Alexander (NZL)	21:36	1:37	1:19:02	1:06	43:35	2:26:57
55	Lisset Olivera (MEX)	20:49	1:43	1:19:01	1:06	44:31	2:27:12
56	Agnes Eppers (BOL)	27:45	2:01	1:16:58	1:20	39:06	2:27:14
57	Carmen Ochoa (MEX)	20:42	1:41	1:21:15	1:13	44:43	2:29:37
58	Lizel Moore (RSA)	22:18	1:48	1:20:25	1:09	46:19	2:32:00

=== Junior men ===
Rank	Name	Swim	T1	Bike	T2	Run	Time
Gold medal	Tim Don (GBR)	18:27	1:22	1:05:31	0:50	32:55	1:59:09
Silver medal	Bryce Quirk (AUS)	18:19	1:22	1:05:41	0:48	33:35	1:59:45
Bronze medal	Levi Maxwell (AUS)	18:17	1:17	1:05:46	0:48	33:40	1:59:51

=== Junior women ===
Rank	Name	Swim	T1	Bike	T2	Run	Time
Gold medal	Nicole Hackett (AUS)	19:36	1:34	1:11:52	0:57	39:10	2:13:14
Silver medal	Rebekah Keat (AUS)	20:01	1:34	1:12:49	1:00	38:22	2:13:51
Bronze medal	Beth Thomson (GBR)	20:28	1:43	1:12:12	1:04	39:00	2:14:33
