= 1997 ITU Triathlon World Cup =

Triathlon World Cup

Series details
- Races: 10

Men's World Cup
- 1st: Chris McCormack (AUS)
- 2nd: Hamish Carter (NZL)
- 3rd: Greg Bennett (AUS)
- Most wins: 2 : Hamish Carter

Women's World Cup
- 1st: Emma Carney (AUS)
- 2nd: Erika Molnár (HUN)
- 3rd: Isabelle Mouthon-Michellys (FRA)
- Most wins: 6: Emma Carney

World Triathlon Cup (formerly ITU Triathlon World Cup)
← 1996	1998 →

The 1997 ITU Triathlon World Cup was a series of triathlon races. The competition represented the highest tier of season-long draft-legal standard distance racing organised by the International Triathlon Union (ITU) for elite-level triathletes. There were ten races held in ten countries, all of them held over a distance of 1500 m swim, 40 km cycle, 10 km run (an 'Olympic-distance' triathlon). At the completion of the season, points gained in each race were aggregated in final standings to crown World Cup champions.

The 1997 season was the seventh season of the event since its foundation in 1991. Miles Stewart and Emma Carney, both of Australia, entered as defending champions, Following a ten race season, Carney defended her title winning six races overall, while fellow Australia Chris McCormack won the men's title, despite winning fewer races than runner-up overall, Hamish Carter of New Zealand..

A separate one-off elite level race event also organised by the ITU, the 1997 ITU Triathlon World Championships, crowned the world champions for the season.

== Men ==
=== Races ===
Date	Location	Gold	Silver	Bronze
13 Apr	Ishigaki (Japan)	Chris McCormack; Australia	Miles Stewart; Australia	Jamie Hunt; New Zealand
27 Apr	Auckland (New Zealand)	Miles Stewart; Australia	Chris McCormack; Australia	Hamish Carter; New Zealand
29 Jun	Monte Carlo (Monaco)	Greg Bennett; Australia	Dmitriy Gaag; Kazakhstan	Chris McCormack; Australia
6 Jul	Gamagori (Japan)	Brad Beven; Australia	Hamish Carter; New Zealand	Stéphan Bignet; France
26 Jul	Stockholm (Sweden)	Simon Lessing; Great Britain	Brad Beven; Australia	Hamish Carter; New Zealand
10 Aug	Tiszaújváros (Hungary)	Craig Walton; Australia	Greg Bennett; Australia	Chris McCormack; Australia
15 Aug	Embrun (France)	Eric van der Linden; Netherlands	Jean-Christophe Guinchard; Switzerland	Ben Bright; New Zealand
21 Sep	Hamilton (Bermuda)	Philippe Fattori; France	Greg Welch; Australia	Chris McCormack; Australia
12 Oct	Cancun (Mexico)	Hamish Carter; New Zealand	Dmitriy Gaag; Kazakhstan	Volodymyr Polikarpenko; Ukraine
26 Oct	Sydney (Australia)	Hamish Carter; New Zealand	Greg Welch; Australia	Miles Stewart; Australia

== Women ==
=== Races ===
Date	Location	Gold	Silver	Bronze
13 Apr	Ishigaki (Japan)	Emma Carney; Australia	Rina Hill; Australia	Jackie Gallagher; Australia
27 Apr	Auckland (New Zealand)	Emma Carney; Australia	Nicole Andronicus; Australia	Melissa Ashton; Australia
29 Jun	Monte Carlo (Monaco)	Michellie Jones; Australia	Emma Carney; Australia	Erika Molnár; Hungary
6 Jul	Gamagori (Japan)	Emma Carney; Australia	Kiyomi Niwata; Japan	Barbara Lindquist; United States
26 Jul	Stockholm (Sweden)	Erika Molnár; Hungary	Rina Bradshaw-Hill; Australia	Mieke Suys; Belgium
10 Aug	Tiszaújváros (Hungary)	Emma Carney; Australia	Erika Molnár; Hungary	Mieke Suys; Belgium
14–15 Aug	Embrun (France)	Mieke Suys; Belgium	Magali Di Marco Messmer; Switzerland	Carol Montgomery; Canada
21 Sep	Hamilton (Bermuda)	Emma Carney; Australia	Carol Montgomery; Canada	Isabelle Mouthon-Michellys; France
12 Oct	Cancun (Mexico)	Erika Molnár; Hungary	Michellie Jones; Australia	Carol Montgomery; Canada
26 Oct	Sydney (Australia)	Emma Carney; Australia	Loretta Harrop; Australia	Barbara Lindquist; United States

== Overall standings ==
Men overall
Rank	Nation	Athlete
1st place, gold medalist(s)	Australia	Chris McCormack
2nd place, silver medalist(s)	New Zealand	Hamish Carter
3rd place, bronze medalist(s)	Australia	Greg Bennett
4	Kazakhstan	Dmitriy Gaag
5	New Zealand	Jamie Hunt
6	Australia	Brad Beven
7	Australia	Greg Welch
8	Australia	Miles Stewart
9	France	Philippe Fattori
10	New Zealand	Shane Reed

Women overall
Rank	Nation	Athlete
1st place, gold medalist(s)	Australia	Emma Carney
2nd place, silver medalist(s)	Hungary	Erika Molnár
3rd place, bronze medalist(s)	France	Isabelle Mouthon
4	Australia	Rina Hill
5	Belgium	Mieke Suys
6	Australia	Michellie Jones
7	Australia	Jackie Gallagher
8	United States	Barbara Lindquist
9	Australia	Nicole Andronicus
10	Canada	Carol Montgomery
