= 1998 ITU Triathlon World Cup =

Triathlon World Cup

Series details
- Races: 9

Men's World Cup
- 1st: Hamish Carter (NZL)
- Most wins: 2 : three athletes

Women's World Cup
- 1st: Michellie Jones (AUS)
- Most wins: 3 : Michellie Jones

World Triathlon Cup (formerly ITU Triathlon World Cup)
| ← 1997 | 1999 → |

The 1998 ITU Triathlon World Cup was a series of triathlon races. The competition represented the highest tier of season-long draft-legal standard distance racing organised by the International Triathlon Union (ITU) for elite-level triathletes. There were ten races held in ten countries, all of them held over a distance of 1500 m swim, 40 km cycle, 10 km run (an 'Olympic-distance' triathlon). At the completion of the season, points gained in each race were aggregated in final standings to crown World Cup champions.

A separate one-off elite level race event also organised by the ITU, the 1998 ITU Triathlon World Championships, crowned the world champions for the season.

== Men ==
=== Races ===
| Date | Location | Gold | Silver | Bronze |
|---|---|---|---|---|
| 12 Apr | Ishigaki (Japan) | Greg Welch; Australia | Jamie Hunt; New Zealand | Chris Hill; Australia |
| 26 Apr | Sydney (Australia) | Greg Welch; Australia | Craig Walton; Australia | Greg Bennett; Australia |
| 21 Jun | Zurich (Switzerland) | Simon Lessing; Great Britain | Andrew Johns; Great Britain | Jean-Christophe Guinchard; Switzerland |
| 12 Jul | Gamagori (Japan) | Alexandre Manzan; Brazil | Dmitriy Gaag; Kazakhstan | Hamish Carter; New Zealand |
| 2 Aug | Corner Brook (Canada) | Craig Walton; Australia | Jan Řehula; Czech Republic | Stephan Poulat; France |
| 9 Aug | Tiszaujvaros (Hungary) | Hamish Carter; New Zealand | Dmitriy Gaag; Kazakhstan | Trent Chapman; Australia |
| 27 Sep | Cancun (Mexico) | Gilberto González; Venezuela | Martin Krňávek; Czech Republic | Dmitriy Gaag; Kazakhstan |
| 1 Nov | Auckland (New Zealand) | Hamish Carter; New Zealand | Chris Hill; Australia | Craig Walton; Australia |
| 8 Nov | Noosa (Australia) | Gilberto González; Venezuela | Hamish Carter; New Zealand | Chris Hill; Australia |

== Women ==
=== Races ===
| Date | Location | Gold | Silver | Bronze |
|---|---|---|---|---|
| 12 Apr | Ishigaki (Japan) | Emma Carney; Australia | Jackie Gallagher; Australia | Michellie Jones; Australia |
| 26 Apr | Sydney (Australia) | Jackie Gallagher; Australia | Loretta Harrop; Australia | Isabelle Mouthon-Michellys; France |
| 21 Jun | Zurich (Switzerland) | Jackie Gallagher; Australia | Magali Di Marco Messmer; Switzerland | Michellie Jones; Australia |
| 12 Jul | Gamagori (Japan) | RinaBradshaw-Hill; Australia | Michellie Jones; Australia | Joanne King; Australia |
| 2 Aug | Corner Brook (Canada) | Michellie Jones; Australia | Marie Overbye; Denmark | Mieke Suys; Belgium |
| 9 Aug | Tiszaujvaros (Hungary) | Loretta Harrop; Australia | Wieke Hoogzaad; Netherlands | Joanne King; Australia |
| 27 Sep | Cancun (Mexico) | Michellie Jones; Australia | Jane Kargotich; Australia | Wieke Hoogzaad; Netherlands |
| 1 Nov | Auckland (New Zealand) | Michellie Jones; Australia | Joanne King; Australia | Sian Brice; Great Britain |
| 8 Nov | Noosa (Australia) | Loretta Harrop; Australia | Laura Bennett; United States | Barbara Lindquist; United States |

== Medalists ==
The season was notable for its domination by Australia, athletes from which won every women's race and three of the men's races, as well as the overall women's title.

Overall, end of season

| Rank | Nation | Gold | Silver | Bronze | Total |
|---|---|---|---|---|---|
| 1 | Australia | 12 | 7 | 9 | 28 |
| 2 | New Zealand | 2 | 2 | 1 | 5 |
| 3 | Venezuela | 2 | 0 | 0 | 2 |
| 4 | Great Britain | 1 | 1 | 1 | 3 |
| 5 | Brazil | 1 | 0 | 0 | 1 |
| 6 | Kazakhstan | 0 | 2 | 1 | 3 |
| 7 | Czech Republic | 0 | 2 | 0 | 2 |
| 8 | Netherlands | 0 | 1 | 1 | 2 |
| 8 | Switzerland | 0 | 1 | 1 | 2 |
| 8 | United States | 0 | 1 | 1 | 2 |
| 11 | Denmark | 0 | 1 | 0 | 1 |
| 12 | France | 0 | 0 | 2 | 2 |
| 13 | Belgium | 0 | 0 | 1 | 1 |
| Totals (13 entries) | | 18 | 18 | 18 | 54 |

== Final classification ==
Men overall
| Rank | Athlete | Nation |
|---|---|---|
| 1st place, gold medalist(s) | Hamish Carter | New Zealand |
| 2nd place, silver medalist(s) | Dmitriy Gaag | Kazakhstan |
| 3rd place, bronze medalist(s) | Chris McCormack | Australia |
| 4 | Greg Bennett | Australia |
| 5 | Gilberto González | Venezuela |
| 6 | Craig Walton | Australia |
| 7 | Chris Hill | Australia |
| 8 | Simon Lessing | Great Britain |
| 9 | Greg Welch | Australia |
| 10 | Jamie Hunt | New Zealand |

Women overall
| Rank | Athlete | Nation |
|---|---|---|
| 1st place, gold medalist(s) | Michellie Jones | Australia |
| 2nd place, silver medalist(s) | Emma Carney | Australia |
| 3rd place, bronze medalist(s) | Isabelle Mouthon | France |
| 4 | Jackie Gallagher | Australia |
| 5 | Erika Molnár | Hungary |
| 6 | Loretta Harrop | Australia |
| 7 | Joanne King | Australia |
| 8 | Mieke Suys | Belgium |
| 9 | Barbara Lindquist | United States |
| 10 | Rina Hill | Australia |
