= 1997 ITU Triathlon World Championships =

The 1997 ITU Triathlon World Championships was a triathlon event held in Perth, Western Australia on 16 November 1997, organised by the International Triathlon Union. The championship was won by Australians Chris McCormack and Emma Carney. The course was a 1.5 kilometres (0.93 mi) swim, 40 kilometres (25 mi) bike, 10 kilometres (6.2 mi) run.

== Results ==
=== Men's Championship ===
Rank	Name	Swim	T1	Bike	T2	Run	Time
Gold medal	Chris McCormack (AUS)	18:48	00:51	0:58:24	00:54	29:32	1:48:29
Silver medal	Hamish Carter (NZL)	18:50	00:52	0:58:22	00:51	29:46	1:48:42
Bronze medal	Simon Lessing (GBR)	18:40	01:00	0:58:24	00:58	30:04	1:49:07
4	Brad Beven (AUS)	18:44	00:51	0:58:28	00:51	30:41	1:49:39
5	Greg Bennett (AUS)	18:49	00:54	0:58:21	00:53	30:48	1:49:47
6	Greg Welch (AUS)	19:02	00:57	0:59:24	00:54	29:37	1:49:55
7	Paul Amey (GBR)	19:18	00:56	0:59:08	00:52	29:44	1:50:00
8	Stephane Poulat (FRA)	18:52	00:54	0:58:19	00:58	31:05	1:50:09
9	Simon Whitfield (CAN)	19:53	00:54	0:58:40	00:52	29:51	1:50:13
10	Jamie Hunt (NZL)	19:54	00:53	0:58:39	00:53	29:56	1:50:17
11	Laurent Jeanselme (FRA)	18:49	00:58	0:58:19	00:58	31:16	1:50:21
12	Stephan Bignet (FRA)	18:58	00:54	0:58:14	00:59	31:18	1:50:23
13	Gilberto González (VEN)	19:12	00:54	0:59:29	00:56	30:09	1:50:44
14	Ralf Eggert (GER)	19:18	00:53	0:59:15	00:53	30:26	1:50:47
15	Dmitriy Gaag (KAZ)	19:18	00:54	0:59:18	01:00	30:31	1:51:03
16	Martin Matula (CZE)	19:57	00:54	0:58:45	00:59	30:34	1:51:10
17	Lothar Leder (GER)	19:21	00:53	0:59:17	00:54	30:52	1:51:19
18	Eric Van Der Linden (NED)	19:17	00:54	0:59:15	00:58	31:05	1:51:31
19	Markus Keller (SUI)	20:08	01:04	0:59:16	00:56	30:14	1:51:39
20	Chris Hill (AUS)	19:12	00:53	0:59:24	00:58	31:18	1:51:47
21	Joachim Willen (SWE)	18:57	00:53	0:58:15	01:05	32:38	1:51:50
22	Takumi Obara (JPN)	19:18	00:54	0:59:19	00:57	31:22	1:51:51
23	Stefan Vuckovic (GER)	19:43	01:02	0:58:31	00:52	31:46	1:51:55
24	Volodymyr Polikarpenko (UKR)	18:58	01:02	0:59:36	00:59	31:18	1:51:57
25	Alec Rukosuev (USA)	18:46	00:58	0:59:50	00:56	31:49	1:52:19
26	Javier Rosas (MEX)	19:10	00:54	0:59:29	00:56	32:04	1:52:35
27	Peter Alder (SUI)	19:12	01:02	0:59:16	00:57	32:16	1:52:44
28	Eneko Llanos (ESP)	20:01	00:56	0:59:29	01:02	31:16	1:52:47
29	Mark O'Donnell (NZL)	19:49	00:51	0:58:52	00:54	32:23	1:52:51
30	Wes Hobson (USA)	18:45	00:59	0:59:44	01:02	32:30	1:53:00
31	Arnd Schomburg (GER)	19:10	00:00	0:59:21	00:00	32:58	1:51:25

=== Women's Championship ===
Rank	Name	Swim	T1	Bike	T2	Run	Time
Gold medal	Emma Carney (AUS)	20:57	00:58	1:03:31	01:02	34:40	1:59:22
Silver medal	Jackie Gallagher (AUS)	20:03	01:02	1:04:23	00:58	35:55	1:59:36
Bronze medal	Michellie Jones (AUS)	21:01	01:05	1:04:49	00:59	36:00	2:00:48
4	Marie Overbye (DEN)	23:17	00:00	1:05:08	00:00	35:26	2:01:05
5	Isabelle Mouthon-Michellys (FRA)	21:08	01:00	1:04:46	01:00	36:55	2:01:09
6	Anja Dittmer (GER)	21:34	00:59	1:04:16	01:02	33:50	2:01:44
7	Virginia Berasategi (ESP)	20:42	01:07	1:03:41	00:57	34:20	2:01:48
8	Rina Hill (AUS)	19:31	00:59	1:04:53	00:57	36:56	2:01:54
9	Mieke Suys (BEL)	21:38	00:00	1:10:38	00:00	35:54	2:02:12
10	Magali Di Marco Messmer (SUI)	21:03	00:00	1:03:42	01:09	36:29	2:02:23
11	Erika Molnár (HUN)	21:20	00:57	1:06:10	00:59	35:07	2:02:34
12	Loretta Harrop (AUS)	19:27	01:00	1:04:59	01:02	36:16	2:02:48
13	Jennifer Gutierrez (USA)	21:58	00:56	1:05:31	00:54	33:12	2:03:14
14	Barbara Lindquist (USA)	21:38	01:04	1:05:46	01:07	34:34	2:03:18
15	Sharon Donnelly (CAN)	21:14	00:59	1:04:42	01:04	33:47	2:03:27
16	Jill Newman (USA)	21:18	00:57	1:06:18	00:59	35:22	2:03:38
17	Wieke Hoogzaad (NED)	21:30	01:11	1:04:11	01:02	35:42	2:03:48
18	Silvia Pepels (NED)	21:32	00:00	1:05:59	00:00	37:22	2:03:55
19	Nicole Andronicus (AUS)	21:08	00:59	1:03:20	00:59	32:52	2:04:00
20	Ines Estedt (GER)	21:11	00:56	1:04:47	01:00	34:16	2:04:04
21	Haruna Hosoya (JPN)	21:09	00:59	1:04:46	01:00	35:53	2:04:09
22	Siri Lindley (USA)	21:27	00:54	1:04:32	01:04	36:10	2:04:10
23	Maribel Blanco (ESP)	21:10	00:57	1:03:21	01:00	34:35	2:04:26
24	Nancy Kemp-Arendt (LUX)	21:27	01:02	1:04:23	00:59	36:07	2:04:27
25	Gail Laurence (USA)	21:30	00:57	1:04:46	01:05	35:44	2:04:29
26	Nóra Edöcsény (HUN)	19:40	00:58	1:06:19	00:59	33:57	2:04:32
27	Christine Hocq (FRA)	20:00	01:02	1:05:54	00:59	35:31	2:04:51
28	Kiyomi Niwata (JPN)	21:38	01:05	1:05:41	01:02	35:41	2:04:54
29	Suzanne Nielsen (DEN)	21:18	01:02	1:06:00	01:00	35:33	2:05:05
30	Natasja Hilgeholt (NZL)	20:41	01:02	1:03:47	01:02	36:40	2:05:08
35	Natascha Badmann (SUI)	20:53	01:05	1:03:31	00:59	33:05	2:06:07
39	Sibylle Matter (SUI)	22:03	00:58	1:05:20	00:59	35:02	2:06:54
44	Nicole Mertes (GER)	20:47	01:07	1:03:34	01:04	37:54	2:10:24

=== Junior men ===
Rank	Name	Swim	T1	Bike	T2	Run	Time
Gold medal	Andriy Glushchenko (UKR)	18:19	00:51	1:02:41	00:51	30:38	1:53:24
Silver medal	András Héczey (HUN)	18:38	01:03	1:02:19	00:57	30:36	1:53:37
Bronze medal	Clemente Alonso (ESP)	18:59	00:57	1:01:57	00:53	31:25	1:54:15

=== Junior women ===
Rank	Name	Swim	T1	Bike	T2	Run	Time
Gold medal	Nicole Hackett (AUS)	18:56	00:59	1:06:37	00:49	38:05	2:05:31
Silver medal	Beth Thomson (GBR)	20:22	01:13	1:06:55	00:59	38:22	2:07:55
Bronze medal	Melanie Mitchell (AUS)	18:53	01:03	1:06:38	00:51	40:59	2:08:28
