= 1996 ITU Triathlon World Cup =

Series details
- Races: 10

Men's World Cup
- 1st: Miles Stewart Australia
- 2nd: Alexandre Manzan Brazil
- 3rd: Leandro Macedo Brazil
- Most wins: 4: Miles Stewart

Women's World Cup
- 1st: Emma Carney Australia
- 2nd: Carol Montgomery Canada
- 3rd: Jackie Gallagher Australia
- Most wins: 7 : Emma Carney

World Triathlon Cup (formerly ITU Triathlon World Cup)
← 1995	1997 →

The 1996 ITU Triathlon World Cup was a series of triathlon races. The competition represented the highest tier of season-long draft-legal standard distance racing organised by the International Triathlon Union (ITU) for elite-level triathletes. There were ten races held in ten countries, all of them held over a distance of 1500 m swim, 40 km cycle, 10 km run (an 'Olympic-distance' triathlon). At the completion of the season, points gained in each race were aggregated in final standings to crown World Cup champions.

This was the sixth edition of the event.

A separate one-off elite level race event also organised by the ITU, the 1996 ITU Triathlon World Championships, crowned the world champions for the season.

== Men ==
=== Races ===
Date	Location	Gold	Silver	Bronze
May 12	Ishigaki (Japan)	Miles Stewart; Australia	Alexandre Manzan; Brazil	Leandro Macedo; Brazil
May 19	Gamagori (Japan)	Alexandre Manzan; Brazil	Leandro Macedo; Brazil	Paul Amey; Great Britain
June 10	Paris (France)	Olivier Marceau; Switzerland	Stéphane Poulat; France	Leandro Macedo; Brazil
June 23	Drummondville (Canada)	Chris McCormack; Australia	Stefan Vuckovic; Germany	Nick Radkewich; United States
June 30	Hamilton (Bermuda)	Dmitriy Gaag; Kazakhstan	Paul Amey; Great Britain	Ralf Eggert; Germany
Sept 21	Ilhéus-Bahia (Brazil)	Alexandre Manzan; Brazil	Philippe Fattori; France	Dmitriy Gaag; Kazakhstan
Sept 28	Rio de Janeiro (Brazil)	Philippe Fattori; France	Alexandre Manzan; Brazil	Dmitriy Gaag; Kazakhstan
Oct 13	Auckland (New Zealand)	Miles Stewart; Australia	Jamie Hunt; New Zealand	Hamish Carter; New Zealand
Oct 20	Sydney (Australia)	Miles Stewart; Australia	Craig Walton; Australia	Greg Bennett; Australia
Nov 3	Noosa (Australia)	Miles Stewart; Australia	Greg Bennett; Australia	Craig Walton; Australia

== Women ==
=== Races ===
Date	Location	Gold	Silver	Bronze
May 12	Ishigaki (Japan)	Emma Carney; Australia	Jackie Gallagher; Australia	Rina Bradshaw-Hill; Australia
May 19	Gamagori (Japan)	Emma Carney; Australia	Rina Bradshaw-Hill; Australia	Carol Montgomery; Canada
June 10	Paris (France)	Emma Carney; Australia	Jenny Rose; New Zealand	Rachel Horn; Great Britain
June 23	Drummondville (Canada)	Emma Carney; Australia	Carol Montgomery; Canada	Jackie Gallagher; Australia
June 30	Hamilton (Bermuda)	Emma Carney; Australia	Gail Laurence; United States	Sabine Graf-Westhoff; Germany
Sept 21	Ilhéus-Bahia (Brazil)	Carol Montgomery; Canada	Nicole Andronicus; Australia	Gail Laurence; United States
Sept 28	Rio de Janeiro (Brazil)	Carol Montgomery; Canada	Nicole Andronicus; Australia	Maria Jose Moreira; Brazil
Oct 13	Auckland (New Zealand)	Emma Carney; Australia	Sarah Harrow; New Zealand	Gail Laurence; United States
Oct 20	Sydney (Australia)	Emma Carney; Australia	Jackie Gallagher; Australia	Wieke Hoogzaad; Netherlands
Nov 3	Noosa (Australia)	Carol Montgomery; Canada	Rina Bradshaw-Hill; Australia	Jackie Gallagher; Australia

== Overall classification ==
Men overall
Rank	Nation	Athlete
1st place, gold medalist(s)	Australia	Miles Stewart
2nd place, silver medalist(s)	Brazil	Alexandre Manzan
3rd place, bronze medalist(s)	Brazil	Leandro Macedo
4	Kazakhstan	Dmitriy Gaag
5	France	Philippe Fattori
6	Australia	Greg Bennett
7	Great Britain	Simon Lessing
8	Germany	Ralf Eggert
9	Australia	Chris McCormack
10	New Zealand	Paul Amey

Women overall
Rank	Nation	Athlete
1st place, gold medalist(s)	Australia	Emma Carney
2nd place, silver medalist(s)	Canada	Carol Montgomery
3rd place, bronze medalist(s)	Australia	Jackie Gallagher
4	Australia	Nicole Andronicus
5	Australia	Rina Hill
6	United States	Gail Laurence
7	New Zealand	Sarah Harrow
8	Germany	Sabine Graf-Westhoff
9	New Zealand	Jenny Rose
10	Canada	Sharon Donnelly
