= 1995 ITU Triathlon World Cup =

Series details
- Races: 10

Men's World Cup
- 1st: Brad Beven (Australia)
- 2nd: Ralf Eggert ^{(de)} (Germany)
- 3rd: Hamish Carter (New Zealand)
- Most wins: Brad Beven (6)

Women's World Cup
- 1st: Emma Carney (Australia)
- 2nd: Isabelle Mouthon (France)
- 3rd: Carol Montgomery (Canada)
- Most wins: Emma Carney (5)

World Triathlon Cup (formerly ITU Triathlon World Cup)
← 1994	1996 →

The 1995 ITU Triathlon World Cup was a series of triathlon races. The competition represented the highest tier of season-long draft-legal standard distance racing organised by the International Triathlon Union (ITU) for elite-level triathletes. There were ten races held in ten countries, all of them held over a distance of 1500 m swim, 40 km cycle, 10 km run (an 'Olympic-distance' triathlon). At the completion of the season, points gained in each race were aggregated in final standings to crown World Cup champions.

A separate one-off elite level race event also organised by the ITU, the 1995 ITU Triathlon World Championships, crowned the world champions for the season.

== Men ==
=== Races ===
Date	Location	Gold	Silver	Bronze
4 June	Gérardmer (France)	Brad Beven; Australia	Ralf Eggert^{(de)} Germany	Markus Keller; Switzerland
17 June	Derry (Northern Ireland)	Brad Beven; Australia	Hamish Carter; New Zealand	Philippe Fattori; France
25 June	San Sebastian (Spain)	Brad Beven; Australia	Ralf Eggert^{(de)} Germany	Hamish Carter; New Zealand
9 July	Gamagori (Japan)	Brad Beven; Australia	Hamish Carter; New Zealand	Cameron Brown; New Zealand
6 August	Drummondville (Canada)	Brad Beven; Australia	Hamish Carter; New Zealand	Craig Walton; Australia
13 August	Cleveland, Ohio (United States)	Leandro Macedo; Brazil	Alec Rukosuev; United States	Tony Deboom; United States
16 September	Ilheus-Bahia (Brazil)	Leandro Macedo; Brazil	Alexandre Manzan; Brazil	Ralf Eggert^{(de)} Germany
24 September	Southampton, Bermuda	Ralf Eggert^{(de)} Germany	Andrew Macmartin; Canada	Jean-Christophe Guinchard; Switzerland
8 October	Auckland (New Zealand)	Hamish Carter; New Zealand	Miles Stewart; Australia	Nataniel Llerandi; United States
15 October	Sydney, Australia	Brad Beven; Australia	Miles Stewart; Australia	Nataniel Llerandi; United States

=== Final standings ===
Rank	Athlete
1st place, gold medalist(s)	(Australia) Brad Beven
2nd place, silver medalist(s)	(Germany) Ralf Eggert ^{(de)}
3rd place, bronze medalist(s)	(New Zealand) Hamish Carter
4	(France) Philippe Fattori ^{(fr)}
5	(Switzerland) Jean-Claude Guichard
6	(United States) Nate Llerandi
7	(France) Benjamin Sanson
8	(New Zealand) Cameron Brown
9	(United Kingdom) Richard Allen
10	(France) Olivier Marceau

== Women ==
=== Races ===
Event	Location	Gold	Silver	Bronze
4 June	Gérardmer (France)	Carol Montgomery; Canada	Isabelle Mouthon-Michellys; France	Jenny Rose; New Zealand
17 June	Derry (Northern Ireland)	Emma Carney; Australia	Isabelle Mouthon-Michellys; France	Jenny Rose; New Zealand
25 June	San Sebastian (Spain)	Emma Carney; Australia	Isabelle Mouthon-Michellys; France	Katie Webb; United States
9 July	Gamagori (Japan)	Rina Bradshaw-Hill; Australia	Claire Carney; Great Britain	Katie Webb; United States
6 August	Drummondville (Canada)	Emma Carney; Australia	Isabelle Mouthon-Michellys; France	Sophie Delemer^{(fr)} France
13 August	Cleveland, Ohio (United States)	Emma Carney; Australia	Isabelle Mouthon-Michellys; France	Carol Montgomery; Canada
16 September	Ilheus-Bahia (Brazil)	Carol Montgomery; Canada	Gail Laurence; United States	Janet Hatfield; United States
24 September	Southampton, Bermuda	Carol Montgomery; Canada	Isabelle Mouthon-Michellys; France	Gail Laurence; United States
8 October	Auckland (New Zealand)	Janet Hatfield; United States	Sophie Delemer^{(fr)} France	Natasha Hilgeholt; New Zealand
15 October	Sydney, Australia	Emma Carney; Australia	Carol Montgomery; Canada	Janet Hatfield; United States

=== Finals standings ===
Rank	Athlete
1st place, gold medalist(s)	(Australia) Emma Carney
2nd place, silver medalist(s)	(France) Isabelle Mouthon
3rd place, bronze medalist(s)	(Canada) Carol Montgomery
4	(United States) Gail Laurence ^{(fr)}
5	(France) Sophie Delemer ^{(fr)}
6	(United States) Janet Hatfield ^{(fr)}
7	(United States) Katie Webb
8	(Canada) Kirstie Otto
9	(Australia) Rina Bradshaw
10	(United States) Natasha Hilgeholt

== See also ==
- 1995 ITU Triathlon World Championships
