= 1996 ITU Triathlon World Championships =

The 1996 ITU Triathlon World Championships was a triathlon event held in Cleveland, Ohio, United States on 24 August 1996, organised by the International Triathlon Union. The championship was won by Simon Lessing of Great Britain and Jackie Gallagher of Australia. The course was a 1.5 kilometres (0.93 mi) swim, 40 kilometres (25 mi) bike, 10 kilometres (6.2 mi) run.

== Results ==
=== Men's Championship ===
Rank	Name	Swim	Bike	Run	Time
Gold medal	Simon Lessing (GBR)	18:24	49:40	30:36	1:39:50
Silver medal	Luc Van Lierde (BEL)	19:28	50:07	29:42	1:40:11
Bronze medal	Leandro Macedo (BRA)	20:11	49:24	30:20	1:41:00
4	Greg Bennett (USA)	18:54	49:07	32:00	1:41:02
5	Philippe Fattori (FRA)	20:03	49:26	30:32	1:41:06
6	Miles Stewart (AUS)	19:12	50:22	30:34	1:41:09
7	Carl Blasco (FRA)	19:53	49:20	30:41	1:41:15
8	Ralf Eggert (GER)	20:01	49:31	30:48	1:41:18
9	Hamish Carter (NZL)	18:45	49:16	32:31	1:41:31
10	Dmitriy Gaag (KAZ)	20:16	49:20	30:54	1:41:40
11	Alexandre Manzan (BRA)	20:10	49:24	31:03	1:41:4
12	Dennis Looze (NED)	18:40	50:52	31:26	1:42:00
13	Andrew Macmartin (CAN)	19:07	50:23	31:32	1:42:08
14	Samuel Pierreclaud (FRA)	19:17	50:07	31:46	1:42:17
15	Craig Walton (AUS)	18:22	49:42	33:19	1:42:22
16	Loch Vollermerhaus (CAN)	19:35	49:28	32:15	1:42:47
17	Stefan Vuckovic (GER)	20:15	49:19	32:11	1:42:47
18	Uzziel Valderrabano (MEX)	20:13	49:20	32:10	1:42:49
19	Ricardo Gonzalez Davila (MEX)	19:43	49:46	32:13	1:43:04
20	Javier Rosas (MEX)	19:08	49:43	32:38	1:43:16
21	Eric Van Der Linden (NED)	19:21	50:05	32:42	1:43:22
22	Stéphane Poulat (FRA)	19:18	50:05	33:01	1:43:29
23	Chippy Slater (AUS)	19:21	50:14	33:13	1:43:47
24	Abe Rogers (USA)	19:56	48:18	34:47	1:43:56
25	Joachim Franzmann (GER)	19:50	49:40	33:29	1:44:04
26	Leonardo Casadio Jardim (BRA)	19:46	49:40	33:32	1:44:08
27	Emerson Gomes (BRA)	19:37	49:47	33:27	1:44:10
28	Jason Harper (AUS)	19:34	49:57	33:44	1:44:18
29	Fedor Filipov (RUS)	19:42	49:49	33:35	1:44:20
30	Fabrizio Ferraresi (ITA)	20:49	51:21	31:07	1:44:27

=== Women's Championship ===
Rank	Name	Swim	Bike	Run	Time
Gold medal	Jackie Gallagher (AUS)	21:36	54:16	33:32	1:50:51
Silver medal	Emma Carney (AUS)	21:51	54:04	34:39	1:51:43
Bronze medal	Carol Montgomery (CAN)	20:22	55:21	34:52	1:52:06
4	Rina Hill (AUS)	20:11	56:05	34:46	1:52:15
5	Karen Smyers (USA)	21:46	54:02	35:30	1:52:42
6	Anja Dittmer (GER)	21:45	54:10	36:13	1:53:13
7	Nicole Andronicus (AUS)	21:00	54:48	36:24	1:53:35
8	Jenny Rose (NZL)	21:48	54:00	37:07	1:54:13
9	Sharon Donnelly (CAN)	20:02	54:38	38:23	1:54:26
10	Nancy Kemp-Arendt (LUX)	20:23	55:30	37:28	1:54:33
11	Magali Di Marco Messmer (SUI)	20:07	55:51	37:29	1:54:39
12	Suzanne Nielsen (DEN)	21:55	56:50	34:56	1:54:57
13	Sarah Harrow (NZL)	20:57	55:09	38:12	1:55:28
14	Julie Nievergelt (USA)	20:42	55:19	38:23	1:55:35
15	Gail Laurence (USA)	21:03	55:01	38:20	1:55:38
16	Evelyn Williamson (NZL)	21:27	54:28	38:27	1:55:39
17	Wieke Hoogzaad (NED)	20:59	55:01	39:24	1:55:56
18	Barbara Lindquist (USA)	19:46	56:13	38:50	1:56:00
19	Natasja Hilgeholt (NZL)	21:04	54:59	39:04	1:56:18
20	Natascha Badmann (SUI)	23:41	55:10	36:42	1:56:37
21	Kathleen Smet (BEL)	20:04	54:35	40:58	1:56:51
22	Maribel Blanco (ESP)	22:39	57:54	35:33	1:56:59
23	Ute Mueckel (GER)	19:33	56:15	39:58	1:56:59
24	Haruna Hosoya (JPN)	21:33	56:08	39:05	1:57:04
25	Brigitte Scheithauer (GER)	20:56	54:55	40:03	1:57:17
26	Mieke Suys (BEL)	21:54	56:59	38:07	1:58:00
27	Joanne Ritchie (CAN)	22:39	57:47	36:43	1:58:21
28	Sylvia Corbett (CAN)	22:23	57:53	37:09	1:58:30
29	Siri Lindley (USA)	22:38	57:49	37:09	1:58:45
30	Virginia Berasategi (ESP)	22:21	57:49	37:17	1:58:45

=== Junior men ===
Rank	Name	Swim	Bike	Run	Time
Gold medal	Sébastien Berlier (FRA)	20:42	54:04	31:29	1:49:24
Silver medal	Andreas Raelert (GER)	20:34	54:17	31:38	1:49:42
Bronze medal	Trent Chapman (AUS)	21:04	54:00	31:49	1:49:55

=== Junior women ===
Rank	Name	Swim	Bike	Run	Time
Gold medal	Joanne King (AUS)	24:49	59:04	34:09	2:01:16
Silver medal	Marie Overbye (DEN)	23:19	59:46	37:09	2:03:32
Bronze medal	Erika Molnar (HUN)	23:13	02:27	34:46	2:03:44
