= 1995 ITU Triathlon World Championships =

The 1995 ITU Triathlon World Championships was a triathlon event held in Cancún, Mexico on 12 November 1995, organised by the International Triathlon Union. The course was a 1.5 kilometres (0.93 mi) swim, 40 kilometres (25 mi) bike, 10 kilometres (6.2 mi) run.

== Results ==
=== Men's Championship ===
The top three finishers in the men's championship race was a repeat of the top 3 from the 1994 ITU Triathlon World Championships.

Rank	Name	Swim	Bike	Run	Time
Gold medal	Simon Lessing (GBR)	21:32	55:48	31:10	1:48:28
Silver medal	Brad Beven (AUS)	00:00	1:17:13	32:13	1:49:22
Bronze medal	Ralf Eggert ^{(de)} (GER)	22:19	54:54	32:45	1:49:49
4	Philippe Fattori (FRA)	22:23	53:17	32:36	1:50:01
5	Ricardo Gonzalez Davila (MEX)	22:13	00:00	00:00	1:50:18
6	Lothar Leder (GER)	22:16	00:00	00:00	1:50:19
7	Alexandre Manzan (BRA)	22:21	55:01	33:04	1:50:27
8	Dmitriy Gaag (KAZ)	22:16	53:14	33:26	1:50:34
9	Roland Knoll (GER)	21:40	53:59	33:09	1:50:40
10	Luc Van Lierde (BEL)	22:30	54:48	33:30	1:50:44
11	Oscar Galindez (ARG)	23:15	52:19	33:35	1:50:58
12	Greg Bennett (USA)	00:00	1:17:10	33:58	1:51:04
13	Takumi Obara (JPN)	21:38	54:01	33:45	1:51:06
14	Fabrizio Ferraresi (ITA)	00:00	1:17:29	33:40	1:51:08
15	Mark Bates (CAN)	22:32	53:17	33:36	1:51:09
16	Stefan Vuckovic (GER)	22:52	54:24	34:12	1:51:25
17	Raul Lemir (ARG)	25:08	00:00	00:00	1:51:34
18	Javier Rosas (MEX)	22:03	53:45	34:14	1:51:35
19	Carl Blasco (FRA)	21:37	53:59	34:22	1:51:45
20	Troy Fidler (AUS)	22:15	53:22	34:25	1:51:52
21	Emerson Gomes (BRA)	22:14	00:00	00:00	1:52:03
22	Tim Bentley (AUS)	24:14	55:54	32:18	1:52:25
23	Andy Kelsey (USA)	00:00	00:00	00:00	1:52:30
24	Leandro Macedo (BRA)	21:40	53:46	35:19	1:52:30
25	Timothy Deboom (USA)	21:38	53:52	35:05	1:52:31
26	Danilo Palmucci (ITA)	23:13	00:00	00:00	1:52:40
27	Henrik Noebbelin (SWE)	22:25	53:10	35:13	1:52:42
28	Hiro Yamaguchi (JPN)	23:15	52:34	35:09	1:52:44
29	Vanny Favotto (ITA)	23:11	52:40	35:05	1:52:47
30	Matias Brain (CHI)	22:18	53:20	35:14	1:52:49
31	Enrique Quevedo Huerta (MEX)	21:38	55:57	35:21	1:52:53
32	Tony Deboom (USA)	21:33	00:00	00:00	1:52:56
33	Alec Rukosuev (USA)	21:42	55:46	35:36	1:53:04
34	Taro Shirato (JPN)	22:22	53:22	35:38	1:53:07
35	Gilberto González (VEN)	22:18	53:33	35:31	1:53:08
36	Toshi Nakayama (JPN)	25:06	52:29	35:36	1:53:09
37	Will Vargas (COL)	22:14	53:19	35:37	1:53:14
38	Fedor Filipov (RUS)	21:40	53:45	35:34	1:53:22
39	Dennis Looze (NED)	21:35	55:49	36:05	1:53:24
40	Olivier Marceau (SUI)	22:04	00:00	00:00	1:53:28
41	Arnd Schomburg (GER)	22:23	53:24	35:58	1:53:33
42	Martin Matula (CZE)	22:29	52:58	36:01	1:53:35
43	Bryan Rhodes (NZL)	23:45	53:37	36:21	1:53:39
44	Peter Reid (CAN)	23:11	54:19	36:13	1:53:42
45	Luc Huntjes (NED)	21:32	54:09	36:19	1:53:47
46	Joachim Enzenhofer (AUT)	22:10	55:11	36:29	1:53:50
47	Leonardo Casadio Jardim (BRA)	23:11	52:30	36:18	1:53:50
48	Jiri Seidl (CZE)	24:01	54:24	33:43	1:53:54
49	Inaki Arenal (ESP)	21:40	53:56	36:22	1:53:54
50	Ariel Oscar Carrigo (ARG)	24:10	53:22	36:27	1:54:00
51	Normann Stadler (GER)	24:17	54:02	34:10	1:54:16
52	Yoshinori Tamura (JPN)	23:41	56:25	34:12	1:54:18
53	Greg Fraiss (NZL)	23:34	54:40	34:17	1:54:25
54	Xavier Llobet (ESP)	22:57	00:00	00:00	1:54:28
Sources: Notes: Some time splits were not available/not provided.

=== Women's Championship ===
Karen Smyers won her second ITU Triathlon World Championships, following up her 1990 Championship win. The win also came one month after capturing the 1995 Ironman World Championship title.

Rank	Name	Swim	Bike	Run	Time
Gold medal	Karen Smyers (USA)	25:06	1:02:53	36:39	2:04:58
Silver medal	Jackie Gallagher (AUS)	25:06	59:42	36:34	2:05:22
Bronze medal	Joy Leutner (USA)	24:04	1:03:05	37:40	2:05:49
4	Suzanne Nielsen (DEN)	25:15	59:37	36:45	2:05:58
5	Isabelle Mouthon-Michellys (FRA)	23:57	00:00	1:01:41	2:06:33
6	Natascha Badmann (SUI)	27:17	59:44	00:00	2:06:49
7	Emma Carney (AUS)	25:12	59:49	38:07	2:07:05
8	Joanne Ritchie (CAN)	27:37	1:00:36	37:57	2:07:07
9	Janet Hatfield (USA)	25:08	1:00:40	38:31	2:07:22
10	Clare Carney (GBR)	25:41	1:03:46	37:20	2:07:46
11	Wieke Hoogzaad (NED)	00:00	1:28:04	39:20	2:08:24
12	Maribel Blanco (ESP)	25:12	1:01:58	39:34	2:08:36
13	Nancy Kemp-arendt (LUX)	23:46	1:00:53	39:51	2:08:57
14	Rina Hill (AUS)	23:52	1:03:21	41:03	2:09:06
15	Ute Mueckel (GER)	23:48	1:00:52	40:09	2:09:10
16	Fernanda Keller (BRA)	27:17	59:08	38:39	2:09:15
17	Martha Sorensen (USA)	00:00	00:00	00:00	2:09:17
18	Manuela Ianesi (ITA)	25:12	59:39	40:06	2:09:17
19	Patty Simpson (CAN)	24:57	1:02:16	40:11	2:09:23
20	Maria Jose Moreira (BRA)	25:07	1:01:22	00:00	2:09:26
21	Silvia Ricco (ITA)	25:18	1:01:55	39:02	2:09:32
22	Carmen Ochoa (MEX)	25:07	00:00	1:01:43	2:09:33
23	Gail Laurence (USA)	00:00	00:00	1:02:09	2:09:47
24	Marisa Gomez (ESP)	00:00	28:02	40:49	2:09:55
25	Nina Anisimova (RUS)	24:09	00:33	40:44	2:09:57
26	Magali Di Marco Messmer (SUI)	23:46	1:02:08	40:55	2:10:05
27	Lydie Reuze (FRA)	24:49	1:00:06	41:12	2:10:27
28	Sue Latshaw (USA)	26:39	1:01:49	40:21	2:10:43
29	Natasja Hilgeholt (NZL)	25:37	1:00:28	40:50	2:11:13
30	Jasmine Haemmerle (AUT)	27:19	1:02:06	40:59	2:11:27
31	Chie Sato (JPN)	25:29	1:01:43	41:01	2:11:39
32	Beatrice Mouthon (FRA)	25:31	1:03:54	41:13	2:11:44
33	Sarah Harrow (NZL)	24:02	1:04:01	42:55	2:12:03
34	Kristie Otto (CAN)	25:34	1:01:35	41:45	2:12:19
35	Adriana Piacsek (BRA)	27:12	58:58	42:03	2:12:35
36	Viv Williams (RSA)	25:50	1:01:09	41:52	2:12:37
37	Bianca Van Woesik (AUS)	25:41	1:00:41	42:23	2:12:50
38	Nerea Martinez (ESP)	25:18	1:00:46	42:24	2:12:52
39	Sylvia Corbett (CAN)	00:00	00:00	00:00	2:12:55
40	Carolyn Hubbard (CAN)	27:01	1:02:29	39:07	2:12:58
41	Kayo Wakatsuki (JPN)	25:23	1:00:41	42:22	2:13:05
42	Imai Ryoko (JPN)	25:23	1:00:43	42:47	2:13:27
43	Asa Anderson (SWE)	27:09	1:02:14	39:42	2:13:39
44	Sonja Frank (CAN)	27:08	1:02:20	39:58	2:13:51
45	Vicky Coronel (ARG)	27:11	1:02:15	39:54	2:13:58
46	Marcia Ferreira (BRA)	27:14	1:02:10	40:09	2:14:09
47	Ayako Suzuki (JPN)	24:09	1:01:12	43:30	2:14:11
48	Iona Wynter (JAM)	25:38	1:00:36	43:39	2:14:25
49	Lou-ann Rivett (RSA)	25:29	00:28	43:51	2:14:45
50	Dominique Donner (RSA)	23:55	1:00:41	46:08	2:15:36
51	Brigitte Huber (SUI)	25:12	1:01:53	44:54	2:15:45
52	Rachel Horn (GBR)	25:25	1:01:33	45:24	2:16:11
53	Francesca Tibaldi (ITA)	27:11	1:02:10	42:20	2:16:33
54	Sophie Delemer (FRA)	27:06	1:01:18	46:21	2:16:51
Sources: Notes: Some time splits were not available/not provided.

=== Junior men ===
Rank	Name	Swim	Bike	Run	Time
Gold medal	Chris Hill (AUS)	22:42	56:03	36:23	1:56:17
Silver medal	Craig Walton (AUS)	22:48	57:09	35:20	1:57:10
Bronze medal	Ralph Zeetsen (NED)	24:30	58:10	34:43	1:58:11

=== Junior women ===
Rank	Name	Swim	Bike	Run	Time
Gold medal	Marie Overbye (DEN)	27:42	1:02:08	38:14	2:10:16
Silver medal	Joelle Franzmann (GER)	26:15	1:01:58	41:28	2:12:32
Bronze medal	Belinda Cheney (AUS)	26:13	1:02:51	41:00	2:12:48
