= 1994 ITU Triathlon World Cup =

Series details
- Races: 10

Men's World Cup
- 1st: Brad Beven (AUS)
- 2nd: Andrew MacMartin (CAN)
- 3rd: Philippe Fattori (FRA)
- Most wins: Brad Beven (6)

Women's World Cup
- 1st: Jenny Rose (NZL)
- 2nd: Gail Laurence (USA)
- 3rd: Sabine Westhoff (GER)
- Most wins: Jenny Rose (3)

World Triathlon Cup (formerly ITU Triathlon World Cup)
← 1993	1995 →

The 1994 ITU Triathlon World Cup was a series of triathlon races organised by the International Triathlon Union (ITU) for elite-level triathletes. There were ten races held in eight countries, all of them held over a distance of 1500 m swim, 40 km cycle, 10 km run (an Olympic-distance triathlon).

== Results ==
=== Amakusa, Japan ===
- 29 May 1994 (US$20,000)

Place	Men		Women	
Place	Name	Time	Name	Time
Gold medal	Wes Hobson (USA)	01:47:41	Rina Bradshaw (AUS)	01:59:20
Silver medal	Nate Llerandi (USA)	01:49:26	Sabine Westhoff (GER)	02:01:37
Bronze medal	Philippe Fattori (FRA)	01:49:34	Jenny Rose (NZL)	02:05:19

=== Osaka, Japan ===
- 5 June 1994 (US$50,000)

Place	Men		Women	
Place	Name	Time	Name	Time
Gold medal	Brad Beven (AUS)	01:51:07	Rina Bradshaw (AUS)	02:05:19
Silver medal	Rainer Müller-Hörner (GER)	01:51:18	Sabine Westhoff (GER)	02:05:40
Bronze medal	Christoph Mauch (SUI)	01:52:37	Jenny Rose (NZL)	02:06:21

=== Nendaz, Switzerland ===
- 19 June 1994 (US$40,000)

Place	Men		Women	
Place	Name	Time	Name	Time
Gold medal	Hamish Carter (NZL)	02:10:01	Sabine Westhoff (GER)	02:29:26
Silver medal	Stephen Foster (AUS)	02:12:21	Jenny Rose (NZL)	02:31:59
Bronze medal	Jim Riccitello (USA)	02:12:32	Karen Smyers (USA)	02:37:13

=== Whistler, Canada ===
- 10 July 1994 (US$20,000)

Place	Men		Women	
Place	Name	Time	Name	Time
Gold medal	Andrew MacMartin (CAN)	01:48:06	Sabine Westhoff (GER)	02:01:12
Silver medal	Frank Clarke (CAN)	01:48:52	Martha Sorenson (USA)	02:03:28
Bronze medal	Christoph Mauch (SUI)	01:49:34	Melissa Mantak (USA)	02:05:23

=== Cleveland, United States ===
- 7 August 1994 (US$40,000)

Place	Men		Women	
Place	Name	Time	Name	Time
Gold medal	Brad Beven (AUS)	01:48:52	Karen Smyers (USA)	02:03:13
Silver medal	Hamish Carter (NZL)	01:48:58	Erin Baker (NZL)	02:03:19
Bronze medal	Andrew MacMartin (CAN)	01:48:59	Rina Bradshaw (AUS)	02:04:05

=== Wilkes-Barre, United States ===
- 14 August 1994 (US$20,000)

Place	Men		Women	
Place	Name	Time	Name	Time
Gold medal	Brad Beven (AUS)	01:54:08	Erin Baker (NZL)	02:10:50
Silver medal	Andrew MacMartin (CAN)	01:54:09	Martha Sorenson (USA)	02:12:27
Bronze medal	Hamish Carter (NZL)	01:56:37	Sabine Westhoff (GER)	2:12:41

=== Ilhéus, Brazil ===
- 17 September 1994 (US$20,000)

Place	Men		Women	
Place	Name	Time	Name	Time
Gold medal	Oscar Galíndez (ARG)	01:53:23	Gail Laurence (USA)	02:07:51
Silver medal	Leandro Macedo (BRA)	01:54:23	Katie Webb (USA)	02:09:30
Bronze medal	Ariel Sarrigo (ARG)	01:55:42	Janet Hatfield (USA)	02:09:40

=== Gérardmer, France ===
- 25 September 1994 (US$20,000)

Place	Men		Women	
Place	Name	Time	Name	Time
Gold medal	Brad Beven (AUS)	01:51:36	Jenny Rose (NZL)	02:06:56
Silver medal	Philippe Fattori (FRA)	01:51:48	Isabelle Mouthon (FRA)	02:11:04
Bronze medal	Markus Keller (SUI)	01:53:40	Gail Laurence (USA)	02:11:43

=== San Sebastián, Spain ===
- 2 October 1994 (US$20,000)

Place	Men		Women	
Place	Name	Time	Name	Time
Gold medal	Brad Beven (AUS)	01:48:54	Jenny Rose (NZL)	02:04:56
Silver medal	Andrew MacMartin (CAN)	01:49:13	Isabelle Mouthon (FRA)	02:07:02
Bronze medal	Philippe Fattori (FRA)	01:51:06	Virginia Berasategi (ESP)	02:08:09

=== Ixtapa, Mexico ===
- 30 October 1994 (US$20,000)

Place	Men		Women	
Place	Name	Time	Name	Time
Gold medal	Brad Beven (AUS)	01:48:53	Jenny Rose (NZL)	02:05:27
Silver medal	Spencer Smith (GBR)	01:49:01	Katie Webb (USA)	02:05:40
Bronze medal	Ricardo González (MEX)	01:49:35	Janet Hatfield (USA)	02:06:00

== Final ranking ==
Place	Men		Women	
Place	Name	Points	Name	Points
Gold medal	Brad Beven (AUS)	—	Jenny Rose (NZL)	—
Silver medal	Andrew MacMartin (CAN)	—	Gail Laurence (USA)	—
Bronze medal	Philippe Fattori (FRA)	—	Sabine Westhoff (GER)	—
4.	Wes Hobson (USA)	—	Katie Webb (USA)	—
5.	Christoph Mauch (SUI)	—	Janet Hatfield (USA)	—
6.	Markus Keller (SUI)	—	Marci Cantu (USA)	—
7.	Hamish Carter (NZL)	—	Rina Bradshaw (AUS)	—
8.	Jean-Claude Guichard (SUI)	—	Melissa Mantak (USA)	—
9.	Mark Bates (CAN)	—	Isabelle Mouthon (FRA)	—
10.	Nate Llerandi (USA)	—	Martha Sorenson (USA)	—

== See also ==
- 1994 ITU Triathlon World Championships
