= Triathlon at the 2002 Commonwealth Games =

- Venue: Salford Quays
- Location: Salford, England
- Dates: 4 August 2002
- Competitors: 57 from 18 nations

Triathlon at the 2002 Commonwealth Games was the inaugural appearance of Triathlon at the Commonwealth Games. Competition was held in Manchester, England, on 4 August 2002. It was the first time that the sport had been on the program.

The events were held in Salford Quays in Salford.

The event consisted of 1,500 metres swimming (two laps of Salford Quays Docks), 40km cycling (four 10km laps) and 10km running (3 circular laps).

Canada topped the triathlon medal table by virtue of winning two gold medals.

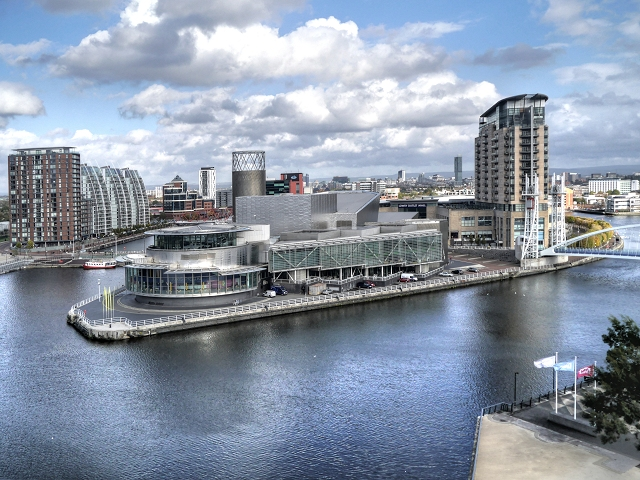
The swim section took place near the Lowry

== Medal summary ==
=== Medal table ===
* Host nation (England)

| Rank | Nation | Gold | Silver | Bronze | Total |
|---|---|---|---|---|---|
| 1 | Canada | 2 | 0 | 0 | 2 |
| 2 | Australia | 0 | 1 | 1 | 2 |
| 3 | Wales | 0 | 1 | 0 | 1 |
| 4 | New Zealand | 0 | 0 | 1 | 1 |
| Totals (4 entries) | | 2 | 2 | 2 | 6 |

=== Medallists ===
| Event | Gold | Silver | Bronze |
|---|---|---|---|
| Men's | Simon Whitfield; Canada | Miles Stewart; Australia | Hamish Carter; New Zealand |
| Women's | Carol Montgomery; Canada | Leanda Cave; Wales | Nicole Hackett; Australia |

== Results ==
=== Men's ===
Result
| Rank | Name | Time |
|---|---|---|
| 1st place, gold medalist(s) | Simon Whitfield (CAN) | 1:51:57 |
| 2nd place, silver medalist(s) | Miles Stewart (AUS) | 1:52:00 |
| 3rd place, bronze medalist(s) | Hamish Carter (NZL) | 1:52:04 |
| 4 | Simon Lessing (ENG) | 1:52:22 |
| 5 | Chris McCormack (AUS) | 1:52:46 |
| 6 | Kris Gemmell (NZL) | 1:52:53 |
| 7 | Andrew Johns (ENG) | 1:53:21 |
| 8 | Craig Watson (NZL) | 1:53:25 |
| 9 | Peter Robertson (AUS) | 1:53:37 |
| 10 | Marc Jenkins (WAL) | 1:53:40 |
| 11 | Stuart Hayes (ENG) | 1:53:41 |
| 12 | Rich Allen (SCO) | 1:54:03 |
| 13 | David Haines (WAL) | 1:56:51 |
| 14 | Tyler Butterfield (BER) | 1:57:01 |
| 15 | Andrew Fargus (SCO) | 1:57:11 |
| 16 | Kevin Clark (SCO) | 1:58:13 |
| 17 | Rory Mackie (ZIM) | 1:59:05 |
| 18 | Richard Llewwllyn Haines (WAL) | 1:59:20 |
| 19 | Jocelyn Gascon-Giroux (CAN) | 2:00:26 |
| 20 | Gavin Noble (NIR) | 2:01:13 |
| 21 | James Amy (JER) | 2:02:26 |
| 22 | Otto David Bell (BAH) | 2:04:23 |
| 23 | Trevor Woods (NIR) | 2:04:54 |
| 24 | Mark Tosh (NIR) | 2:05:37 |
| 25 | Dermot Galea (MLT) | 2:05:45 |
| 26 | Chris Walker (GIB) | 2:06:15 |
| 27 | Manwel Falcon (MLT) | 2:06:39 |
| 28 | Sigurd Haveland (GIB) | 2:08:31 |
| 29 | Jason Gooding (TTO) | 2:13:23 |
| 30 | Muhamad Razani (MAS) | 2:15:03 |
| 31 | Kent Richardson (BER) | 2:16:40 |
| 32 | Eugene Chan (MAS) | 2:19:16 |
| 33 | Martin Cross (NFK) | 2:35:43 |
| 34 | Dave Savage (KIR) | 2:48:29 |
| — | Graeme Donaldson (NFK) | DNS |

=== Women's ===
Result
| Rank | Name | Time |
|---|---|---|
| 1st place, gold medalist(s) | Carol Montgomery (CAN) | 2:03:17 |
| 2nd place, silver medalist(s) | Leanda Cave (WAL) | 2:03:37 |
| 3rd place, bronze medalist(s) | Nicole Hackett (AUS) | 2:03:42 |
| 4 | Heather Evans (NZL) | 2:03:53 |
| 5 | Sharon Donnelly (CAN) | 2:05:19 |
| 6 | Michellie Jones (AUS) | 2:05:51 |
| 7 | Michelle Dillon (ENG) | 2:06:08 |
| 8 | Jodie Swallow (ENG) | 2:06:22 |
| 9 | Anneliese Heard (WAL) | 2:06:52 |
| 10 | Evelyn Williamson (NZL) | 2:07:27 |
| 11 | Julie Dibens (ENG) | 2:07:51 |
| 12 | Natasha Filliol (CAN) | 2:08:43 |
| 13 | Catriona Morrison (SCO) | 2:10:52 |
| 14 | Bella Comerford (SCO) | 2:14:40 |
| 15 | Karen Jones (BER) | 2:18:36 |
| 16 | Trudi Barnes (RSA) | 2:19:59 |
| 17 | Julie Murphy (NIR) | 2:21:02 |
| 18 | Kelly Mouttet (TRI) | 2:22:02 |
| 19 | Maria Mifsud Bonnici (MLT) | 2:23:19 |
| 20 | Serena Francis (COK) | 2:27:37 |
| 21 | Loretta Harrop (AUS) | DNF |
| 22 | Steph Forrester (SCO) | DNS |
