= 1994 ITU Triathlon World Championships =

The 1994 ITU Triathlon World Championships were held in Wellington, New Zealand on 27 November 1994 and organised by the International Triathlon Union. The course was a 1.5 kilometres (0.93 mi) swim, 40 kilometres (25 mi) bike, 10 kilometres (6.2 mi) run.

== Results ==
=== Men's Championship ===
Rank	Name	Swim	Bike	Run	Time
Gold medal	Spencer Smith (GBR)	17:45	1:00:20	32:56	1:51:04
Silver medal	Brad Beven (AUS)	17:45	1:02:04	31:57	1:51:49
Bronze medal	Ralf Eggert (GER)	18:44	1:01:06	32:47	1:52:40
4	Mark Bates (CAN)	18:29	1:01:42	32:25	1:52:41
5	Philippe Fattori (FRA)	18:38	1:02:08	32:10	1:52:58
6	Dennis Looze (NED)	18:04	1:01:47	33:09	1:53:04
7	Andrew MacMartin (CAN)	18:09	1:01:51	33:04	1:53:06
8	Troy Fidler (AUS)	18:03	1:01:51	33:15	1:53:14
9	Scott Molina (USA)	18:00	1:02:27	32:14	1:53:20
10	Markus Keller (SUI)	18:51	1:01:03	33:30	1:53:26
11	Rainer Müller-Hörner (GER)	17:50	1:02:10	33:24	1:53:26
12	Ricardo González Dávila (MEX)	18:31	1:01:21	33:40	1:53:35
13	Brad Kearns (USA)	18:54	1:02:02	32:50	1:53:49
14	Greg Bennett (USA)	18:55	1:00:54	34:01	1:53:52
15	Thomas Hellriegel (GER)	19:44	1:01:08	33:15	1:54:08
16	Wes Hobson (USA)	18:05	1:01:51	34:31	1:54:31
17	Tomas Kocar (CZE)	18:13	1:01:25	35:21	1:55:03
18	Mark Lees (AUS)	19:13	1:02:56	32:56	1:55:07
19	Stefan Jakobsen (CAN)	18:40	1:02:09	34:50	1:55:39
20	Nathaniel Llerandi (USA)	17:42	1:03:26	34:38	1:55:48
21	Carl Blasco (FRA)	17:57	1:04:17	33:43	1:56:00
22	Leandro Macedo (BRA)	19:28	1:03:50	32:43	1:56:03
23	Frank Clarke (CAN)	20:31	1:02:58	32:49	1:56:19
24	Tim Bentley (AUS)	18:42	1:05:01	32:42	1:56:31
25	Didier Volckaert (BEL)	19:23	1:02:46	34:30	1:56:42
26	Benjamin Sanson (FRA)	17:08	1:03:36	36:00	1:56:46
27	Norbert Domnik (AUT)	00:00	0:00:00	00:00	1:56:48
28	Loch Vollermerhaus (CAN)	17:48	1:02:03	37:04	1:56:57
29	Martin Matula (CZE)	20:04	1:01:33	35:19	1:57:00
30	Joachim Enzenhofer (AUT)	19:10	1:04:06	33:45	1:57:02

=== Women's Championship ===
Rank	Name	Swim	Bike	Run	Time
Gold medal	Emma Carney (AUS)	20:17	1:07:04	35:44	2:03:18
Silver medal	Anette Pedersen (DEN)	20:53	1:07:43	36:54	2:05:31
Bronze medal	Sarah Harrow (NZL)	20:03	1:08:15	38:30	2:06:52
4	Suzanne Nielsen (DEN)	20:29	1:09:36	37:07	2:07:17
5	Isabelle Mouthon-Michellys (FRA)	20:49	1:09:23	37:05	2:07:19
6	Bianka van Woesik (AUS)	21:05	1:09:31	37:20	2:07:57
7	Jenny Rose (NZL)	21:25	1:08:29	38:34	2:08:31
8	Jackie Hallam (AUS)	21:25	1:11:17	36:39	2:09:23
9	Rina Hill (AUS)	19:45	1:12:03	38:04	2:09:54
10	Jeasnnine De Ruysscher (BEL)	21:32	1:08:35	39:59	2:10:07
11	Gail Laurence (USA)	20:15	1:09:56	40:02	2:10:15
12	Ute Schaefer (GER)	23:22	1:07:14	40:13	2:10:49
13	Ann Keat (NZL)	20:00	1:09:35	41:43	2:11:21
14	Simone Mortier (GER)	21:20	1:10:30	39:39	2:11:32
15	Sophie Delemer (FRA)	22:22	1:09:50	39:34	2:11:49
16	Dolorita Gerber (SUI)	23:41	1:11:14	36:56	2:11:53
17	Karen Smyers (USA)	21:16	1:09:54	40:47	2:11:58
18	Irma Heeren (NED)	00:00	0:00:00	00:00	2:12:20
19	Jill Westenra (NZL)	22:57	1:10:08	39:44	2:12:49
20	Lisa Bentley (CAN)	23:27	1:11:25	37:56	2:12:50
21	Maria Melin (SWE)	20:27	1:13:45	38:44	2:12:58
22	Dorothy Cribb Fiona (CAN)	22:02	1:12:25	38:43	2:13:11
23	Nina Anisimova (RUS)	19:42	1:13:13	40:16	2:13:13
24	Alison Hamilton (IRL)	23:24	1:11:13	38:45	2:13:25
25	Sabine Graf-Westhoff (GER)	19:47	1:13:38	40:18	2:13:37
26	Katie Webb (USA)	21:50	1:13:22	38:31	2:13:47
27	Alison Hollington (GBR)	22:44	1:11:38	39:35	2:14:00
28	Kelley Kwiatrowski (USA)	21:27	1:12:56	39:39	2:14:06
29	Sue Clark (NZL)	23:35	1:11:11	39:25	2:14:14
30	Francisca Rüssli (SUI)	22:37	1:09:48	02:59	2:14:30
31	Dominique Donner (RSA)	19:33	1:13:21	44:28	2:17:22

== See also ==
- 1994 ITU Triathlon World Cup
