= Clare Carney =

British triathlete

Personal information
- Full name: Clare Carney

Sport
- Country: Great Britain
Medal record
Women's Triathlon
Representing Australia
ITU World Championship
Gold medal – first place	1994 Wellington	Junior Women

Clare Carney is a British-born former professional triathlete and the 1994 ITU Junior Triathlon World Champion, who competed originally for Australia before transferring her registration to compete for Great Britain.

== Personal life ==
Carney was born in England and is the younger sister of fellow former professional triathlete Emma Carney. They also had an older sister, Jane, who died of cancer in 2006.

In 2013 Clare suffered a cardiac arrest whilst swimming at Melbourne Sports and Aquatic Centre and survived due to timely intervention by poolside medical assistance and CPR. Her sister Emma also similarly suffered heart problems in the past which put an end to her professional triathlon career in 2004.

== Triathlon career ==
Clare originally competed internationally for Australia, before switching registrations to compete for Great Britain from 1998 onwards.

=== Competing for Australia ===
Clare's first professional race was in 1994, when she took gold in the Juniors at the Wellington ITU Triathlon World Championships. Her sister Emma took the Elite women's title at the same competition.

She followed this up with a silver at the Gamagori ITU Triathlon World Cup in 1995, a 7th-place finish at the Sydney ITU World Cup and 10th place at Cancun, behind the winner Karen Smyers of the United States and Emma in 7th place.

She contested the 1997 ITU Duathlon World Championships in Guernica, coming 4th before transferring to compete for Great Britain.

=== Competing for Great Britain ===
Clare's first race as a British athlete was at the Ishigaki ITU Triathlon World Cup in 1998, following this with races at Cancun (1998), Ishigaki (1999), Gamagori (1999) and Sydney (1999) but she failed to reproduce the results achieved as an Australian-registered athlete.
