= Machiko Nakanishi =

Japanese triathlete (born 1976)

Machiko Nakanishi (中西 真知子, Nakanishi Machiko; born November 19, 1976 in Osaka Prefecture) is an athlete from Japan, who competes in triathlon. Nakanishi competed at the second Olympic triathlon at the 2004 Summer Olympics. She took twentieth place with a total time of 2:08:51.06.
