= Edith Cigana =

Italian triathlete (born 1968)

Edith Cigana (born 15 February 1968) is an athlete from Italy. She competes in triathlon.

Cigana competed at the first Olympic triathlon at the 2000 Summer Olympics. She took twenty-seventh place with a total time of 2:07:06.81.
