= Matias Brain =

Chilean triathlete (born 1974)

Personal information
- Born: January 15, 1974 (age 52) Santiago, Chile

Sport
- Sport: Triathlon

Matias "Mati" Brain Peña (born January 15, 1974) is a Chilean triathlete. Nicknamed "Mati", Brain competed at the first Olympic triathlon at the 2000 Summer Olympics. He took forty-first place with a total time of 1:53:44.90.
