= Eric van der Linden =

Dutch triathlete

Eric van der Linden (born 17 April 1974 in Schagen, North Holland) is an athlete from the Netherlands. He competes in triathlon.

Van der Linden competed at the first Olympic triathlon at the 2000 Summer Olympics. He took forty-second place with a total time of 1:54:32.04.
