= Carol Montgomery =

Canadian triathlete

Personal information
- Born: August 24, 1966 (age 59) Sechelt, British Columbia, Canada

Sport
- Sport: Triathlon
Medal record
Women's Triathlon
Representing Canada
ITU World Championships
Silver medal – second place	1990 Orlando	Individual
Silver medal – second place	2000 Perth	Individual
Bronze medal – third place	1996 Cleveland	Individual
ITU World Cup
Silver medal – second place	1993	Overall
ITU Duathlon World Championships
Gold medal – first place	1993 Arlington	Individual
Pan American Games
Bronze medal – third place	1999 Winnipeg	Individual
Commonwealth Games
Gold medal – first place	2002 Manchester	Individual

Carol Montgomery (born August 24, 1965) is an Olympic athlete from Canada who competed in triathlon and athletics. She won a bronze medal at the 1999 Pan American Games in Winnipeg, Manitoba, Canada, and a bronze and a silver at the 1995 Mar del Plata Pan American Games in the 5,000m and 10,000m respectively. She was the World Duathlon Champion in 1993. Once won, she never competed in another duathlon event. She won the gold medal in the 2002 Commonwealth Games in Manchester and often refers to this race as the highlight of her career.

She did race in high school but only in grades 8 to 10 before, returning to running while at Simon Fraser University in 1986, where she honed her running capabilities before embarking on her triathlon career.

Montgomery considered her triathlon career as a full-time "job", and thus competed in very few track races. She competed only once at 1,500m, six times at the 3,000m, six times at the 5,000m, and completed just nine 10,000m events.

She competed at the first Olympic triathlon at the 2000 Summer Olympics. She did not finish the competition due to a crash on the bike leg. She was also selected to compete in the 10,000 meters on the track, but had to withdraw due to injury sustained in the triathlon crash.

Four years later, at the 2004 Summer Olympics, Montgomery finished in 35th place with a time of 2:15:25.62.

== Personal records ==
10000m - 32:11.19
5000m - 15:36.27
3000m - 9:04
1500m - 4:18
