= Evelyn Williamson =

New Zealand triathlete

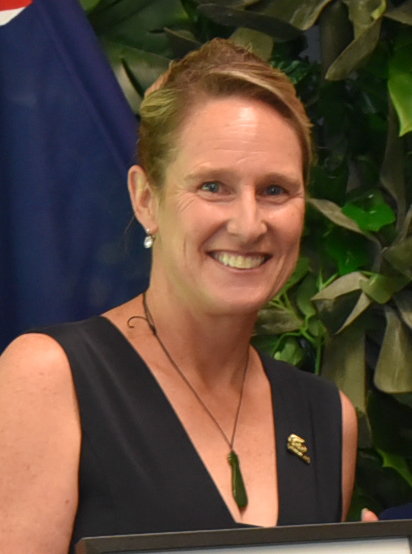
- Williamson in 2020
Medal record
Women's triathlon
Representing New Zealand
ITU Triathlon World Championships
| Bronze medal – third place | 1998 Lausanne | Elite women's race |

Evelyn Catherine Laura Williamson (born 30 August 1971) is an athlete from New Zealand, who competes in triathlon.

Williamson competed at the first Olympic triathlon at the 2000 Summer Olympics. She took twenty-second place with a total time of 2:05:38.30.

Williamson placed 3rd at the 1998 ITU Triathlon World Championships.

Williamson qualified as the alternate for the 2008 Beijing Olympics, but as New Zealand does not send their alternates along with the three-person team, she did not attend.
