= Brad Beven =

Australian triathlete (born 1968)

Medal record

Men's Triathlon

Representing Australia

ITU World Championships
Silver medal – second place	1990 Orlando	Individual
Silver medal – second place	1994 Wellington	Individual
Silver medal – second place	1995 Cancún	Individual

ITU World Cup
Gold medal – first place	1992	Overall
Gold medal – first place	1993	Overall
Gold medal – first place	1994	Overall
Gold medal – first place	1995	Overall

Bradley William Beven OAM (born 18 September 1968) is a retired triathlete from Mirriwinni, Cairns Region, Queensland Australia.

== Hall of Fame ==
In 2009, Beven was inducted into the Queensland Sport Hall of Fame.

== Personal life ==
Brad Beven lived in Mirriwini. He attended St Augustines College in Cairns. He still holds numerous records at the college.
