= Joachim Willén =

Swedish triathlete (born 1972)

Joachim Willén (born 23 August 1972) is a triathlete from Sweden.

Willen competed at the first Olympic triathlon at the 2000 Summer Olympics. He took thirty-fifth place with a total time of 1:51:40.80.
