= Christine Hocq =

French triathlete

Christine Hocq (born 1970) is an athlete from France, who competes in triathlon.

Nicknamed "Titi", Hocq competed at the first Olympic triathlon at the 2000 Summer Olympics. She took eighth place with a total time of 2:03:01.90. Her split times were 19:43.78 for the swim, 1:05:33.90 for the cycling, and 0:37:44.22 for the run.
