= Silvia Pepels =

Dutch triathlete

Silvia Maria Johannes Pepels (born 6 January 1975 in Stein, Limburg (Netherlands)) is an athlete from the Netherlands. She competes in triathlon.

Pepels competed at the first Olympic triathlon at the 2000 Summer Olympics. She took twenty-sixth place with a total time of 2:07:05.01.
