= Nóra Edöcsény =

Hungarian triathlete (born 1974)

Nóra Edöcsény-Hóbor (born February 2, 1974, in Budapest) is an athlete from Hungary, who competes in triathlon. Edocseny competed at the first Olympic triathlon at the 2000 Summer Olympics. She took nineteenth place with a total time of 2:05:20.03.
