= Jo King =

Australian triathlete

Jelk "Joanne" King
- Born: 1976 (age 49–50)
- Years active: 1994-2003
- Known for: 2× International Triathlon Union World Champion: 1996 (junior title, Cleveland); 1998 (senior title, Lausanne)

Joanne King is an Australian triathlete, born in 1976 in Portland, Victoria who came to prominence as a triathlete in 1996. She was inducted into the International Triathlon Union's Hall of Fame in 2019.

== Early life ==
Before focusing on triathlon, King competed in regional running events in Melbourne, Warrnambool and Geelong. She started to train for triathlons in her late teens.

== Career ==
King is a two-time World Champion: ITU Junior title in 1996 and ITU Senior title in 1998. Her last major win was in 2003 at the ITU Triathlon Asian Cup held in Singapore.

King retired in 2000 due to injury. At the Ironman distance, she was top performing Australian female in both 1998 and 1999.
