= Michellie Jones =

Australian triathlete

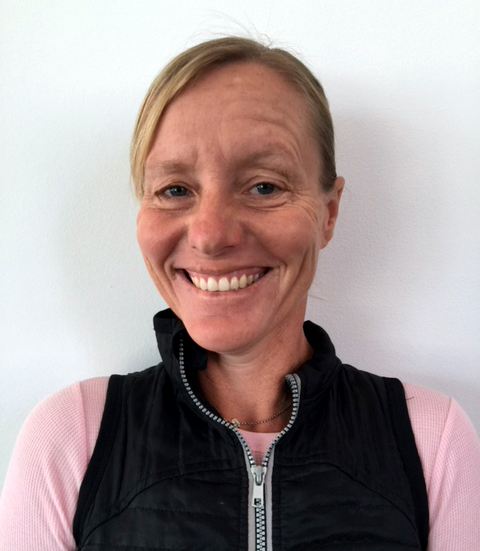
- Jones in 2016

Personal information
- Born: 6 September 1969 (age 57) Fairfield, New South Wales, Australia
- Height: 180 cm (5 ft 11 in)
- Weight: 60 kg (9 st 6 lb; 132 lb)

Sport
- Country: Australia
- Sport: Triathlon
Medal record
Representing Australia
Olympic Games
Silver medal – second place	2000 Sydney	Individual
Paralympic Games
Gold medal – first place	2016 Rio de Janeiro	PT5 guide
ITU World Championships
Gold medal – first place	1992 Huntsville	Elite
Gold medal – first place	1993 Manchester	Elite
Silver medal – second place	1998 Lausanne	Elite
Silver medal – second place	2001 Edmonton	Elite
Bronze medal – third place	1991 Queensland	Elite
Bronze medal – third place	1997 Perth	Elite
Bronze medal – third place	2000 Perth	Elite
Bronze medal – third place	2003 Queenstown	Elite
Gold medal – first place	2015 Chicago	PT5 guide
ITU World Cup
Gold medal – first place	1998	Overall
Gold medal – first place	2000	Overall
Bronze medal – third place	1993	Overall
Ironman World Championship
Gold medal – first place	2006	Individual
Silver medal – second place	2005	Individual

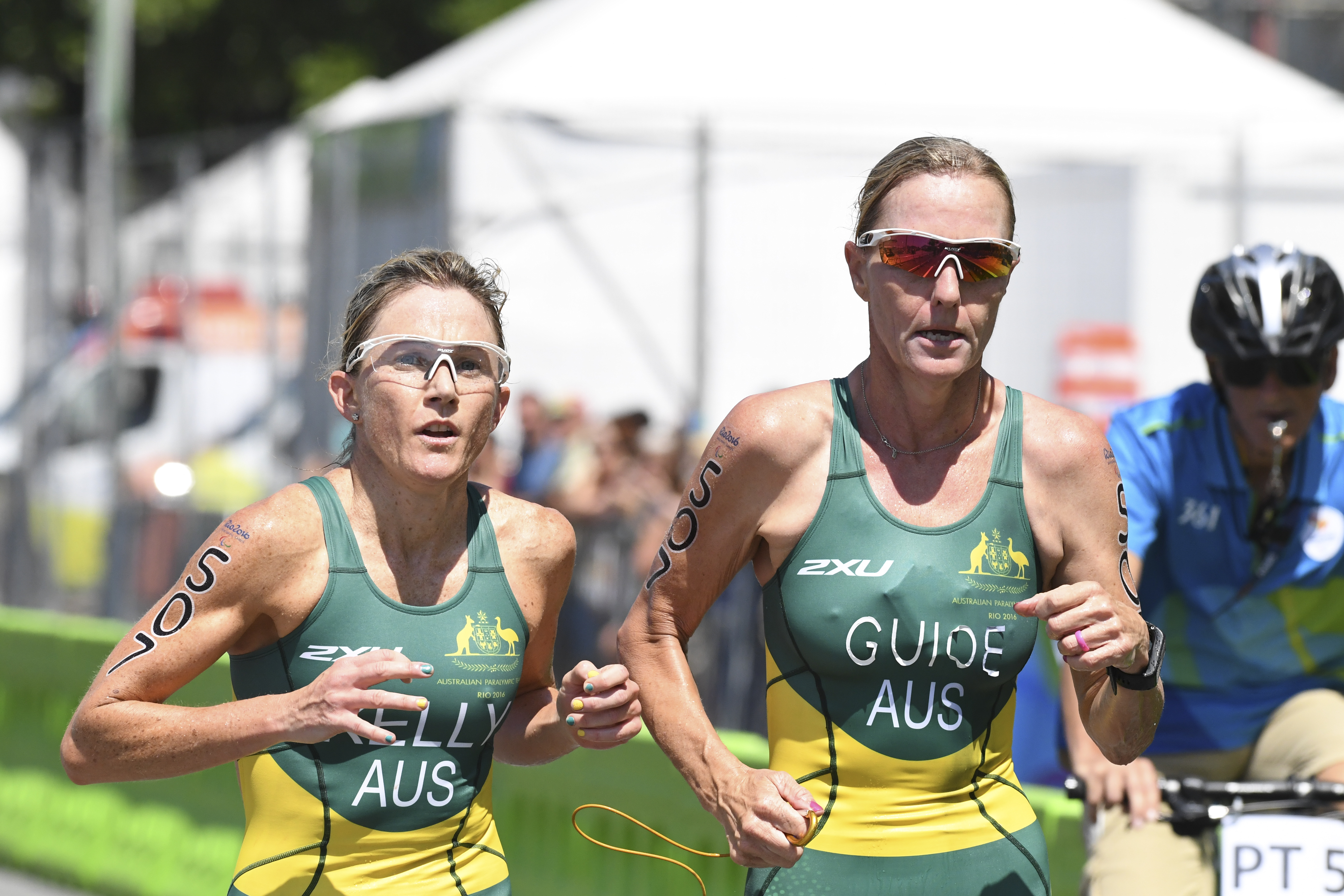
Kelly and Jones at the 2016 Paralympics

Michellie Yvonne Jones AM (/mɪˈkiːli/ mi-KEE-lee; born 6 September 1969) is an Australian triathlete. She has won two ITU Triathlon World Championships, an Olympic silver medal, and the 2006 Ironman World Championship. She won a gold medal at the 2016 Summer Paralympics as a guide for Katie Kelly, when paratriathlon made its debut at the Paralympics.

== Personal life ==
Jones currently lives in Carlsbad, California. She is a graduate from the University of Wollongong with a Diploma of Teaching in Primary Education in 1990. She has a twin sister, Gabrielle Jones.

== Athletic career ==
Jones started competing in triathlons in 1990. In 1992 and 1993 she won the ITU Triathlon World Championships. In 1996, she won the inaugural XTERRA Triathlon World Championships. Jones would go on to further expand her triathlon résumé by winning the ITU Triathlon World Cup in 1998 and 1999. At the 2000 Summer Olympics Jones took the silver medal in the inaugural triathlon event with a total time of 2:00:42.55, only two seconds behind gold medalist Brigitte McMahon. Her split times were 19:43.88 for the swim, 1:05:32.90 for the cycling and 0:35:25.77 for the run.

After recently expanding into Iron distance competition, Jones took second place in the 2005 Ironman World Championship, losing the lead during the run to Natascha Badmann. This was only the second time that she competed in an iron distance triathlon. Later she won the 2006 Ironman Arizona Triathlon, finishing with a time of 9:12:53, and the Ironman Triathlon in Kailua-Kona, Hawaii in 9:18:31. With this victory, Jones became the first Australian woman to win a World Ironman Championship and it made her the second Australian in history to win the event, behind 1994 Men's World Champion, Greg Welch.

In May 2015, it was confirmed that Jones would be Australian paratriathlete Katie Kelly's new guide in the lead up to the 2016 Summer Paralympics. With Jones, she won the World Paratriathlon Event held in Yokohama, Japan on 16 May 2015. Kelly with guide Jones won their first World Championship title after a come-from-behind victory at the 2015 World Championships Final in Chicago. At the 2016 Rio Paralympics, Jones was the guide for Kelly when they won the gold medal in the Women's PT5 event.

Jones reflects on her medal win with Kelly stating: "This is so much better because when I think of everything KK (Katie Kelly) has been through and to be able of doing everything she’s done in such short amount of time,” she said. “To me this is the best thing that I’ve ever done.” Jones expresses further explaining "Disability doesn't define you, it's what you do with it that does" She was made a Member of the Order of Australia in 2017.
