= Haruna Hosoya =

Japanese triathlete

Haruna Hosoya (細谷 はるな, Hosoya Haruna; born April 23, 1973 in Kawanishi, Hyōgo) is an athlete from Japan. She competes in the triathlon.

Hosoya competed at the first Olympic triathlon at the 2000 Summer Olympics. She was involved in a collision during the cycling portion of the event, but continued and ran the 20km portion with minor scrapes and cuts.
