= Takumi Obara =

Japanese triathlete

Takumi Obara (小原 工, Obara Takumi; born February 9, 1967) is an athlete from Japan. He competes in the triathlon.

Obara competed at the first Olympic triathlon at the 2000 Summer Olympics. He took twenty-first place with a total time of 1:50:29.95.
