= Miles Stewart =

Australian triathlete

Medal record

Men's triathlon

Representing Australia

Commonwealth Games
Silver medal – second place	2002 Manchester	Individual

ITU World Championships
Gold medal – first place	1991 Queensland	Individual
Bronze medal – third place	1998 Lausanne	Individual
Bronze medal – third place	1999 Montreal	Individual

ITU World Cup
Gold medal – first place	1996	Overall
Silver medal – second place	1993	Overall

Miles Stewart (born 4 May 1971 in Sydney, Manly) is an athlete from Australia, who competes in triathlon.

Originally a speedskater from Wollongong he rose to the elite ranks of the emerging sport of triathlon in the early 1990s whilst living on Queensland's Gold Coast.

Palmarès

- 3 time (consecutive) winner of the Hervey Bay Triathlon.
- He won the silver medal at the 2002 Commonwealth Games in Manchester.
- Stewart competed at the first Olympic triathlon at the 2000 Summer Olympics. He took sixth place with a total time of 1:49:14.52.
- Currently CEO of Triathlon Australia

Stewart can be found in the Guinness Book of World Records for the fastest triathlon time in the world.
