= Emma Carney =

Australian triathlete

Personal information
- Full name: Emma Elizabeth Carney
- Born: 29 July 1971 (age 55) Bourne End, England
- Height: 170 cm (5 ft 7 in)
- Weight: 56 kg (123 lb)

Sport
- Country: Australia
- Retired: 2004
Medal record
Women's Triathlon
Representing Australia
ITU World Championship
Gold medal – first place	1997 Perth	Elite
Gold medal – first place	1994 Wellington	Elite
Silver medal – second place	1996 Cleveland	Elite
Bronze medal – third place	1999 Montreal	Elite
ITU Triathlon World Cup
Gold medal – first place	1997	Elite
Gold medal – first place	1996	Elite
Gold medal – first place	1995	Elite
Women's Duathlon
ITU Duathlon World Championships
Silver medal – second place	1999 Huntersville	Elite

Emma Elizabeth Carney (born 29 July 1971) is an Australian former professional triathlete and two time World Triathlon Champion. She is one of a few triathletes in the world to have won two ITU / World Triathlon world titles. She was the world number one triathlete according to ITU/World Triathlon rankings in 1995, 1996 and 1997, and achieved 19 World Cup wins. With seven wins in 1996, she also holds the record for the greatest number of ITU/World Triathlon World Series wins in a single season and also the longest reign as world number 1 Triathlete. Emma has won more ITU/World Triathlon events than any other Australian Triathlete.

She is an inductee of the Sport Australia Hall of Fame (2016), the ITU / World Triathlon Hall of Fame (2014), and the Triathlon Australia Hall of Fame (2012).

== Early life ==
Carney was born in England, but moved to Australia with her family, including sister Clare who also became an athlete, at an early age.

Carney began her sporting life as a runner: when she was in grade four, she was the only girl to win a medal in the school (Wesley College) cross-country mixed race. As a teenager, Carney remembers jogging after school every day. "From that time on there has hardly been a day when I haven't trained", she said. At 13 she set a Victorian record in her 3,000 m debut, and at 18 she was winning national school titles. She reached the finals in the under-20 national championships in the 1,500 m and 3,000 m, winning minor medals. Emma progressed as a runner and represented Australia in 2 World Cross Country Championships (Budapest, Hungary 1994 and Durham, UK 1995) and two road relay teams (Seoul, South Korea Women's Ekiden 1993 and Chiba, Japan Ekiden 1994 the latter running the fastest time of her 5 km leg and the team winning a bronze medal for Australia). Athletics Australia issued Emma with representative number #700. Injuries frustrated Emma and it her father suggestion, she adopted some cross-training and triathlons to train while recovering from her injuries. Carney quickly became one of the few athletes to represent Australia in two sports – athletics and triathlon.

== Triathlon ==
In the spring of 1993, Carney tried her first triathlon, which she won after overcoming a seven-minute deficit from a 700-metre swim. Her accountant father, David, told her, "It's 18 months until the world championship in Wellington. If you learn to swim faster, you'll be the best triathlete in the world." She recalled, "My father went over everything I had to do point by point and it all made sense."

=== ITU racing ===
In November 1994, she fulfilled her father's prediction, winning the ITU World title – her first international triathlon – by a record margin of 2 minutes 12 seconds. From June 1995 to April 1997, Carney recorded an unbroken string of 12 straight ITU World Cup wins. After a narrow loss to Michellie Jones at the 1997 Monaco World Cup, she recorded another four straight World Cup victories, before adding another ITU World Champion title in November. Viral infections meant that she failed to win the 1995 and 1996 World Championships, but still finished second in 1996.

Her fellow 1997 World Champion, Chris McCormack said, "Emma is hard!", referring to her shockingly long training at fearlessly high intensity, and her ruthless ferocity in competition.

=== Decline ===
After winning the Ishigaki World Cup race in April 1998, Carney never again won a World Cup or World Championship race. In July she could only manage 15th in the World Cup race at Gamagōri, then failed to finish at the Lausanne World Championships in August (mechanical), but partly recovered to finish fourth in the November Auckland World Cup race. In 1999, Emma developed a metatarsal injury in 1999 while finishing 4th in the Ishikaki World Cup, and this prevented her from running and biking for eight weeks. Despite this she finished 3rd in the Montreal World Championships. In 2000, she qualified for the Australian Olympic women's triathlon team, but was not selected. An appeal to the CAS. was made and despite winning every stage, the decision remained.

She described this period as a "shitty time", when she could not work out what was wrong. She said, "my reaction to racing badly was to train harder—which was the worst thing I could do for my heart." Despite her problems, she won some races, including the 1998 Australian National Championship, the 1999 Australian Long Course Championship and the 2000 Australian long course and sprint national championships.

=== Retirement from professional triathlon ===
Carney was forced to retire from professional triathlon in 2004 after suffering a cardiac arrest in Canada. She was later diagnosed with ventricular tachycardia, a life-threatening condition that causes the heart to beat too fast and out of control, usually during high-intensity anaerobic exercise. The doctors found it difficult to diagnose her condition, partly because Carney's resting heart rate when asleep was only 21 bpm. In October 2004 surgeons implanted an implantable cardioverter defibrillator (ICD) in the right ventricle of her heart.

She later speculated, "I always raced so hard that maybe it contributed to damaging my heart. Having said that, I probably was unable to approach it differently. That was just the way I was wired – all or nothing."

== Later life ==
In 2006, Carney's elder sister Jane died of cancer. She had thought that her heart problems were "really hard", but describes her sister's death as "a well of anguish that surpasses anything I'd ever seen or felt in life."

After her ICD implant, doctors told her that she could not exercise at all, but Carney found that not exercising made her heart worse and that instead it was better to exercise a little every day to keep it under control. She then found that she could do "quite a lot" of training, provided she avoids damaging high-intensity spurts. For example, she completed an ironman-length (180 km) bike ride, and hopes eventually to complete a full iron-distance race. Occasionally, she exercised too hard, causing her ICD to "shock" her heart, as happened once when she was out running with her father. It also happened in 2008 when she was taking part in the 299 km Melbourne-to-Warrnambool bike race, when she forgot about her condition and attempted to chase down the leading pack.

Carney has had a strained relationship with her sport's governing body, Triathlon Australia (TA), mainly due to their incompetence for her when she was racing and the demise of the sport of Triathlon under their governance. The decline of the Sport of Triathlon in Australia has led her to speak out about the 'appalling waste of taxpayers money for no result'. Emma has also sought better care for athletes and on diagnosis of her heart condition, called on TA to require annual ECG and ultrasound tests of their elite athletes.

Carney now spends her time working in the World Triathlon Education and Development team and contributing to educational frameworks for coaches and athletes. In 2025 she commenced work as a consultant to the Saudi Arabia Triathlon Federation in coach education design, event bidding support and High Performance support.

Emma has written her autobiography – Hard Wired: Life, Death and Triathlon – which she details her life from diaries and journals she kept. It has been described as one of the most honest sporting autobiographies written by an athlete, because Emma details her early life, her commitment to her dream and her sporting excellence with the same attention to details she displayed in her sporting career. Unable to write on her Olympic Appeal, Emma had a historian reconstruct her appeal proving she was not afforded a fair trial. Her father David also provides a chapter which shines further light on this. In her autobiography, Emma also describes the loss of her sister Jane to cancer and her brief marriage which she claims the only highlight was the birth of her son, Jack.

== Results ==
Note: only top-ten finishes are shown in the table below.

Date	Position	Event	Venue	Swim time	T1	Bike time	T2	Run time	Total time
6 September 2003	7	ITU Triathlon World Cup	Hamburg	20:00		1:00:43		35:23	1:56:07
20 July 2003	9	ITU Triathlon World Cup	Corner Brook	21:07		1:12:20		36:35	2:10:02
15 June 2003	6	ITU Triathlon World Cup	Gamagōri	21:34		1:01:29		36:24	1:59:29
15 April 2001	9	ITU Triathlon World Cup	Gamagōri	20:12		1:03:47		36:06	2:00:05
8 July 2000	7	ITU Triathlon World Cup	Toronto	20:15		1:02:09		35:24	1:59:05
30 April 2000	7	ITU Triathlon World Championships	Perth	20:11	0:48	1:07:44	0:39	26:31	1:55:55
7 November 1999	2	ITU Triathlon World Cup	Noosa	20:47		0:59:47		35:14	1:55:49
12 September 1999	3	ITU Triathlon World Championships	Montreal	20:00	0:37	0:59:04	0:32	36:08	1:56:19
11 April 1999	4	ITU Triathlon World Cup	Ishigaki	18:32		1:03:13		39:02	2:00:48
1 November 1998	4	ITU Triathlon World Cup	Auckland						2:01:26
2 August 1998	8	ITU Triathlon World Cup	Corner Brook	20:07		1:15:02		36:16	2:11:26
12 April 1998	1	ITU Triathlon World Cup	Ishigaki	19:41		1:07:01		36:42	2:03:24
16 November 1997	1	ITU Triathlon World Championships	Perth	20:57	0:58	1:03:31	1:02	34:40	1:59:22
26 October 1997	1	ITU Triathlon World Cup	Sydney	20:19	0:35	1:23:37	0:32	35:47	2:00:32
21 September 1997	1	ITU Triathlon World Cup	Hamilton	20:55		1:06:09		36:50	2:03:54
10 August 1997	1	ITU Triathlon World Cup	Tiszaújváros	22:15		1:03:44		34:22	2:00:22
6 July 1997	1	ITU Triathlon World Cup	Gamagōri	21:25		1:04:30		37:48	2:03:44
29 June 1997	2	ITU Triathlon World Cup	Monte Carlo						2:09:47
27 April 1997	1	ITU Triathlon World Cup	Auckland	22:39		1:04:26		35:09	2:02:15
13 April 1997	1	ITU Triathlon World Cup	Ishigaki	20:28		1:05:25		36:12	2:02:05
20 October 1996	1	ITU Triathlon World Cup	Sydney						1:58:15
13 October 1996	1	ITU Triathlon World Cup	Auckland						2:03:19
24 August 1996	2	ITU Triathlon World Championships	Cleveland	21:51	0:27	0:54:04	0:36	34:39	1:51:43
30 June 1996	1	ITU Triathlon World Cup	Hamilton						1:49:34
23 June 1996	1	ITU Triathlon World Cup	Drummondville	22:46		1:00:59		34:08	1:57:55
10 June 1996	1	ITU Triathlon World Cup	Paris						1:06:23
19 May 1996	1	ITU Triathlon World Cup	Gamagōri						1:57:54
12 May 1996	1	ITU Triathlon World Cup	Ishigaki	21:26		1:04:43		34:50	2:01:00
12 November 1995	7	ITU Triathlon World Championships	Cancún	25:12	2:11	0:59:49	0:48	38:07	2:07:05
6 August 1995	1	ITU Triathlon World Cup	Drummondville						1:53:12
25 June 1995	1	ITU Triathlon World Cup	San Sebastián						2:02:37
17 June 1995	1	ITU Triathlon World Cup	Derry						2:01:21
27 November 1994	1	ITU Triathlon World Championship	Wellington	20:17		1:07:04		35:44	2:03:18

Source: ITU profile.

== Awards and honours ==
- 2012 – Triathlon Australia Hall of Fame
- 2014 – International Triathlon Union Hall of Fame
- 2016 – Inducted as Athlete Member of the Sport Australia Hall of Fame
