= Jackie Fairweather =

Australian triathlete, long-distance runner and coach (1967-2014)

Personal information
- Full name: Jacquilyn Louise Fairweather
- Nationality: Australia
- Born: 10 November 1967 Perth, Western Australia, Australia
- Died: 1 November 2014 (aged 46) Canberra, Australian Capital Territory, Australia
- Spouse: Simon Fairweather (m. 2004)
Medal record
Representing Australia
Women's road running
Commonwealth Games
Bronze medal – third place	2002 Manchester	Marathon
Women's triathlon
ITU World Championships
Gold medal – first place	1996 Cleveland	1.5+40+10
Silver medal – second place	1995 Cancún	1.5+40+10
Silver medal – second place	1997 Perth	1.5+40+10
Silver medal – second place	1999 Montreal	1.5+40+10
Women's duathlon
ITU Duathlon World Championships
Bronze medal – third place	1994 Hobart	Elite
Gold medal – first place	1996 Ferrara	Elite
Gold medal – first place	1999 Huntersville	Elite

Jacquilyn Louise "Jackie" Fairweather (née Gallagher; 10 November 1967 – 1 November 2014) was an Australian world champion triathlete, long-distance runner, coach and Australian Institute of Sport high-performance administrator.

== Personal life ==
Jacquilyn Louise Gallagher was born on 10 November 1967 in Perth. Her parents were Delys and Martin, and she had two younger brothers: Matthew and Joshua. In 1979, whilst living in Sydney, she became involved in Little Athletics. She moved to Brisbane in the mid-1980s; and, in 1989, she completed a Bachelor of Human Movement Studies (First Class Honours) at the University of Queensland. In 1991, she completed a Master of Science (Exercise Physiology and Cardiac Rehabilitation) at the Eastern Illinois University. In 2001, she moved to Canberra to take up the position of Head Coach of the newly established Australian Institute of Sport triathlon program. In 2004, she married Simon Fairweather, Australian archery gold medallist from the 2000 Sydney Olympics.

== Triathlon career ==
Fairweather began competing in triathlons in 1992 and won the elite Australian National Series in her first season. She spent eight years as a professional triathlete. In 1996 she became the world triathlon champion, setting a championship record time of 1 hour 50 minutes 52 seconds in Cleveland, Ohio, United States. She also won the World Duathlon Championships in 1996 to become the only person ever to win both world titles in the same year.

Fairweather won the Duathlon World Championships again in 1999, but she missed repeating the double when she placed 2nd to Loretta Harrop in the Triathlon World Championship. Gallagher collected further World Championship silver medals in 1995 and 1997.

== Distance running career ==
After finishing 11th in her first-ever marathon, in Boston, she won the bronze medal in the marathon at the 2002 Commonwealth Games. In 2005, she won the Gold Coast Marathon.

IAAF personal bests
Event	Time	Place	Date
5000 metres	16:19.43	Melbourne	12 February 2004
10,000 metres	33:14.16	Melbourne	17 December 1992
Half marathon	1:18:37	Gold Coast	1 July 2007
Marathon	2:32:40	Nagoya	14 March 2004
50 kilometres run	3:19:12	Canberra	13 April 2008
100 kilometres run	7:41:23	Keswick	19 September 2009

== Sports administration ==
In 2001, Fairweather was appointed to the position of Head Coach of the newly established Australian Institute of Sport triathlon program. From 2005 to her death on 2014, she held senior sport administration positions with the Australian Sports Commission /Australian Institute of Sport. These positions primarily assisted the high performance programs of national sports organisations.

Fairweather played a major role in triathlon administration and positions included: Triathlon Australia national elite selector, International Triathlon Union (ITU) Athletes Committee (1998–2002) athlete member, ITU Women's Committee member (1997–98) and Triathlon Australia Board Member (first ever athletes' representative) (1998–2001).

== Death ==
On 4 November 2014, it was announced that Fairweather had died by suicide at the age of 46 on 1 November 2014, nine days before her 47th birthday. Her death led to many former athletes recognizing her achievements.

Her main Australian triathlon rival in the 1990s, Emma Carney, said: "Jackie was a perfectionist[,] and I think perhaps Jackie never really appreciated – or realised – all that she achieved. It wasn't just the races she won, or the sports she excelled in – Jackie was a pioneer in Australian triathlon coaching and administration."

Emma Snowsill, 2008 Beijing Olympics women's triathlon gold medalist, commented that "You shared and cared in your knowledge and passion for our sport more than anyone[,] Jackie Fairweather. “Not only a hero for your athletic abilities, but your generosity to help many up-and-coming athletes to pave a way for themselves and the future of the sport is second to none…" Snowsill was a member of Fairweather's Australian Institute of Sport triathlon squad.

Her memorial service was held at the AIS Arena with more than 600 people attending. The location was apt, as it was where Jackie worked for 13 years and met her husband Simon.

== Recognition ==
- Australian Triathlete of the Year – 1993 & 1996
- Australian Sports Woman of the Year (Confederation of Australian Sport) – 1996
- Australian Sports Medal – 2000
- Triathlon Australia Hall of Fame – 2012
- International Triathlon Union Hall of Fame – 2017
