= Jean-Christophe Guinchard =

Swiss triathlete

Medal record

Men's Triathlon

Representing Switzerland

ITU Long Distance World Championships
Bronze medal – third place	1997 Nice	Elite

Jean-Christophe Guinchard (born 1 November 1967) is an athlete from Switzerland. He competes in triathlon.

Guinchard competed at the first Olympic triathlon at the 2000 Summer Olympics. He took 24th place with a total time of 1:50:50.76.
