= Simon Lessing =

British triathlete (born 1971)

Simon Christopher Lessing MBE
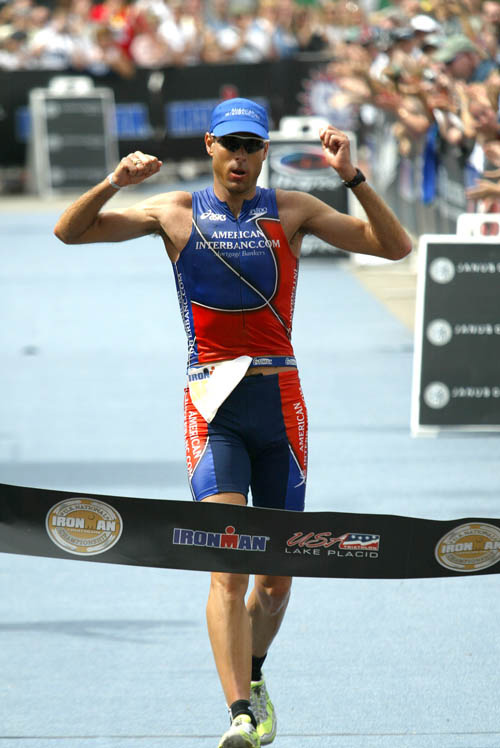
- Simon Lessing at Lake Placid

Personal information
- Born: 12 February 1971 (age 55) Cape Town, South Africa

Sport
- Country: Great Britain
- Sport: Triathlon
- Retired: 2008
Medal record
Men's Triathlon
Representing Great Britain
ITU World Championships
Gold medal – first place	1992 Huntsville	Individual
Gold medal – first place	1995 Cancún	Individual
Gold medal – first place	1996 Cleveland	Individual
Gold medal – first place	1998 Lausanne	Individual
Silver medal – second place	1993 Manchester	Individual
Silver medal – second place	1999 Montreal	Individual
Bronze medal – third place	1997 Perth	Individual
ITU Long Distance World Championships
Gold medal – first place	1995	Individual
ETU European Championships
Gold medal – first place	1991	Individual
Gold medal – first place	1993	Individual
Gold medal – first place	1994	Individual
Ironman World Championship 70.3
Silver medal – second place	2006	Individual
Goodwill Games
Gold medal – first place	1994 St Petersburg Russia	Individual
Gold medal – first place	1998 New York USA	Individual

Simon Christopher Lessing, MBE, (born 12 February 1971) is a British triathlete who won five International Triathlon Union (ITU) world titles (1992, 1995(2), 1996 and 1998). He also won races at 70.3 (Half Ironman), ITU long distance and Ironman-distance events. He set an Olympic-distance world record in 1996, and is noted for his 2004 Ironman Lake Placid win, where he set a course record of 8:23:12. In 2008 he retired from professional racing. Simon resides in Boulder, Colorado, United States, where he operates Boulder Coaching with Darren de Reuck.

He was appointed a Member of the Order of the British Empire (MBE) in the 2000 New Year Honours for services to triathlon.

== Athletic career ==
=== Early years ===
Born in Cape Town, Western Cape South Africa, Lessing completed school at Kloof High School in Kloof near Durban. Table Mountain was the backdrop to his formative years. His father and mother (who was a swim coach) supported him. By the end of his fifth year at school, he had won honours in swimming, sailing and biathlon and was known as a cross-country runner. When Lessing was 9, his family moved to Durban, a port city set on the East Coast.

Growing up, surfing and rugby were two of the major sports in Durban, but Lessing resisted the pressure to make the change to these activities. He trained an average of 3 hours a day in his areas of interest: sailing, swimming, track, cross-country and duathlon. He developed an interest in hiking and hiked in the Drakensberg Mountain range. His swim coach, David McCarney, encouraged Lessing to try a family oriented race he organised at Kloof High School. In 1988, Lessing was the South African triathlon champion. He was selected to represent South Africa in a biathlon but suffered a broken leg in an accident during a local triathlon.

Lessing moved to Britain at age 18 and continued his international sporting career in Europe. He was entitled to dual citizenship because his mother was born in England.

=== Professional racing ===
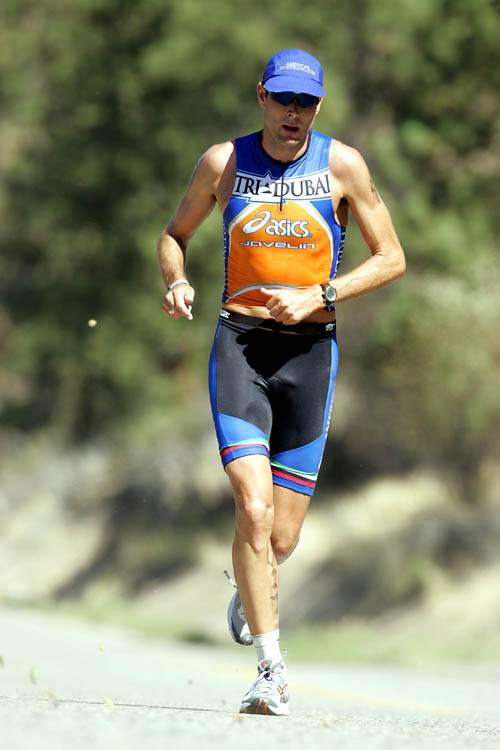
Simon Lessing running a triathlon

During the 1990s he and rival Spencer Smith, were among some of the most successful athletes in Olympic distance triathlon. Lessing won the ITU Olympic Distance Triathlon World Championship in 1992, 1995, 1996, and 1998. In 1996, Lessing broke the Olympic distance triathlon world record with a time of 1 hour, 39 minutes, 50 seconds in 1996 at the ITU Triathlon World Championships in Cleveland.

Lessing competed in the Escape from Alcatraz Triathlon held annually in San Francisco Bay. He won the men's elite division there in 1996, 2003, and 2004. Lessing competed at the first Olympic games triathlon at the 2000 Summer Olympics. He took ninth place with a total time of 1:49:24.32. Simon was Inducted into the International Triathlon Union Hall of Fame in 2014 and Inducted into the Boulder Sports Hall of Fame in 2012.

=== Long course racing ===
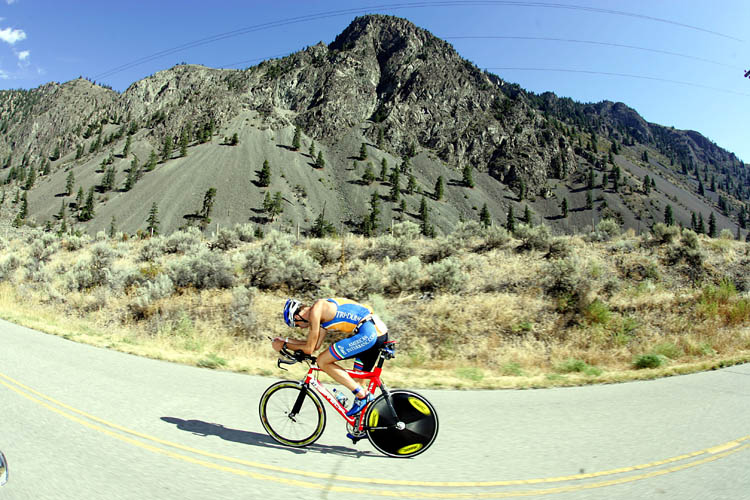
Simon Lessing in the bike portion of a triathlon

Lessing's first attempt at long course triathlon took place in 1993 on the Nice triathlon course, in the Côte d'Azur. In the race he stayed with 9-time defending champion Mark Allen until within 5 kilometres of the finish. He went on to win the Nice race in 1995.

Lessing has won numerous Ironman 70.3 races, including the inaugural Ironman 70.3 Florida in 2004, and again in 2005. In 2005, he set a then course record at the Wildflower triathlon. The next year he took first place at the Ironman 70.3 Vineman. In August 2007 Lessing won the Ironman Timberman 70.3.

==== Ironman ====
In July 2004, Lessing qualified for the 2004 Ironman World Championships with a win and course record of 8:23:12 at Ironman Lake Placid. In his first appearance at the Ironman World Championships (2004) he dropped out halfway into the bike leg, due to the high winds and problems with his back.

Lessing did not complete the marathon at the 2005 Ironman Coeur d'Alene and failed to qualify there for Ironman World Championship. He raced again the same summer and qualified for the World Championships by taking 4th place at Ironman Canada in Penticton in a time of 8:43:13. He did not complete the marathon at the 2005 World Championships.
