= Marie Overbye =

Danish triathlete (born 1976)

Marie Overbye (born 19 January 1976) is an athlete from Denmark, born in Silkeborg. She competes in triathlon.

Her best international results include a fourth place at the Triathlon World Championships 1997 in Perth, Australia, as well as a 2nd and 3rd rank in the World Cup in 1998 and 2000.

Overbye competed at the first Olympic triathlon at the 2000 Summer Olympics. She took twenty-eighth place with a total time of 2:07:17.51.
