= Chris Hill (triathlete) =

Australian triathlete

Personal information
- Born: 24 September 1975 (age 50) Brisbane, Australia

Sport
- Country: Australia
- Sport: Triathlon
Medal record
Men's triathlon
Representing Australia
ITU Triathlon World Championships
Gold medal – first place	2001 Edmonton	Elite
ITU Triathlon World Cup
Gold medal – first place	2001	Elite

Chris Hill (born 24 September 1975) is an Australian former professional triathlete. He won the overall title of the World Triathlon Cup in 2001, also finishing second at the ITU Triathlon World Championship that year.
