= Stéphane Poulat =

French triathlete

Stéphane Poulat (born 8 December 1971) is an athlete from France. He competes in triathlon.

Poulat competed at the second Olympic triathlon at the 2004 Summer Olympics. He placed fourteenth with a total time of 1:53:51.35.
