= Maribel Blanco =

Spanish triathlete

Maribel Blanco Velasco (born 12 January 1969) is an athlete from Spain who competes in triathlon.

Blanco competed at the first Olympic triathlon at the 2000 Summer Olympics. She took twenty-fourth place with a total time of 2:06:37.84.
