= World Triathlon Cup =

Annual series of triathlon races

The World Triathlon Cup is an annual series of triathlon races staged around the world, organised by World Triathlon, the IOC-recognised world governing body of the sport. The events are operated under the standard rules of World Triathlon which, in contrast to the Ironman triathlon formats which are not organised by world Triathlon, allow drafting in the cycle leg, and are held over both 'standard' and 'sprint' (half standard) distances.

The event has existed in two distinct eras. Between 1991 and 2008, the World Cup was the highest level of season-long draft-legal professional triathlon racing, crowning an annual World Cup champion, although a separate World Championship event crowned the formal World Champions of the sport. Following the creation of the World Triathlon Championship Series for 2008, however, the World Cup circuit became the second tier global circuit, below the Championship Series but above the Continental Cups circuit.

The event continues to exist as the second tier in World Triathlon-controlled, draft legal racing, alongside start-up private events such as Super League Triathlon, now known as supertri and the T100 Triathlon format backed by the Professional Triathletes Organisation, but no longer crowns an end of season World Cup champion.

== Background ==
Inaugurated in 1991, the World Cup began as an attempt to create a regular season under the management of the then International Triathlon Union, in tandem with the ITU Triathlon World Championship which was contested as a single winner-takes-all championship race. However, this meant that over the course of a season, there was a World Cup champion as well as a world champion.

Following the 2008 series the ITU reorganized its top level competitions and created the World Triathlon Championship Series, a series of races that was to be the successor of the single race World Championship. Meanwhile, the World Cup was demoted to become a second tier series, and initially as a result the number of races in the World Cup were reduced. Since the reformat, points earned in World Cup racing are now applied only to an athlete's World Ranking.

== Points ==
At its founding the first twenty athletes each race would earn points dependent on their placing and the athletes with the most points at the end of the season would be named the World Cup champion.

Former Scale (1991-2008)
Place	1st	2nd	3rd	4	5	6	7	8	9	10	11	12	13	14	15	16	17	18	19	20
Points	50	44	39	35	31	27	24	21	18	15	13	11	9	7	6	5	4	3	2	1

With the reorganization in 2009 and the discontinuation of the world cup champion title it was decided that world cup points should contribute to an athlete's world series. This was managed by allowing athletes best two world cup placements could be considered as part of their world series ranking. However, due ranking being based on an athlete's four highest scoring appearances that year along with the fact that world series races were worth 2.5 times as much as a world cup meant that no contribution was made to any athlete in the top 10.

(2009-2014)
Place	1st	2nd	3rd	4	5	6	7	8	9	10	11	12	13	14	15	16	17	18	19	20	21	22	23	24	25	26	27	28	29	30
Points	300	278	257	237	220	203	188	174	161	149	138	127	118	109	101	93	86	80	74	68	63	58	54	50	46	43	40	37	34	31

After 2014 world cup points totals were increased awarding first place 500 points and each subsequent athlete 7.5% less points that the athlete before for the first 50 athletes as long as they made the time cut (5% to the winner's time in the men's event and 8% in the women's event). However the points would no longer contribute to an athlete's world series score and only to an athlete's world ranking.

== World Cup Winners (1991-2008) ==
World Cup champions were declared annually between 1991 and 2008, based on the final accumulated point totals as earned in each year's series of World Cup races, with double points awarded for results achieved in the ITU Triathlon World Championship race. The declared champions from 1991 to 2008 were:

Year	Men's champion	Women's champion
1991	Leandro Macedo (BRA)	Karen Smyers (USA)
1992	Andrew MacMartin (CAN); Brad Beven (AUS)	Melissa Mantak (USA)
1993	Brad Beven (AUS)	Joanne Ritchie (CAN)
1994	Brad Beven (AUS)	Jenny Rose (NZL)
1995	Brad Beven (AUS)	Emma Carney (AUS)
1996	Miles Stewart (AUS)	Emma Carney (AUS)
1997	Chris McCormack (AUS)	Emma Carney (AUS)
1998	Hamish Carter (NZL)	Michellie Jones (AUS)
1999	Andrew Johns (GBR)	Loretta Harrop (AUS)
2000	Dmitriy Gaag (KAZ)	Michellie Jones (AUS)
2001	Chris Hill (AUS)	Siri Lindley (USA)
2002	Greg Bennett (AUS)	Siri Lindley (USA)
2003	Greg Bennett (AUS)	Barbara Lindquist (USA)
2004	Dmitriy Gaag (KAZ)	Anja Dittmer (GER)
2005	Hunter Kemper (USA)	Annabel Luxford (AUS)
2006	Javier Gómez (ESP)	Vanessa Fernandes (POR)
2007	Javier Gómez (ESP)	Vanessa Fernandes (POR)
2008	Javier Gómez (ESP)	Samantha Warriner (NZL)

While the series continued after 2008, the events now stood as a series of stand alone races with no overall champion.

== See also ==
- Hy-Vee Triathlon
- Mooloolaba Triathlon
- Noosa Triathlon
- Salford Triathlon
