= Chris McCormack (triathlete) =

Australian triathlete (born 1973)

Chris 'MACCA' McCormack
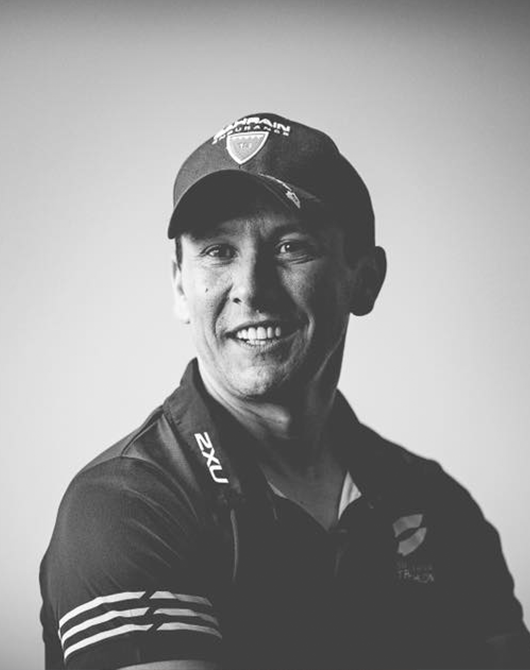
- Chris McCormack

Medal record

Representing Australia

Men's triathlon

ITU World Championships
Gold medal – first place	1997 Perth	Individual

ITU World Cup
Gold medal – first place	1997	Overall World Cup
Silver medal – second place	1998	Overall World Cup
Bronze medal – third place	1999	Overall World Cup
Silver medal – second place	2001	Overall World Cup

Goodwill Games
Gold medal – first place	2001	Individual

Ironman World Championship
Gold medal – first place	2010	Individual
Gold medal – first place	2007	Individual
Silver medal – second place	2006	Individual

ITU Long Distance World Championships
Gold medal – first place	2012	Individual

Christopher John McCormack (born 4 April 1973), also known as Macca, is an Australian triathlete. McCormack is a two-time winner of the Ironman World Championship, winning the titles in 2007 and 2010. He is also the winner of the 1997 International Triathlon Union (ITU) World Cup Series, the 1997 Triathlon World Championships and the 2012 Long Distance World Championships making him a four-time triathlon world champion. He was inducted into the AusTriathlon Hall of Fame for 2023, and appointed a Member of the Order of Australia in the 2026 King's Birthday Honours.

== Early life ==
McCormack's early athletic career began in primary school where he participated in many team sports. He joined the school's soccer and rugby teams. McCormack's high school years were spent at Kirrawee High School in Sydney, where McCormack continued his sporting endeavours winning several distinguished sporting awards including the NSW Sporting Blue for the best athlete in the state. McCormack finished 5th in 1989 and 7th in 1990 at the Australian Schools cross country titles but was pushed by his parents to focus on education over sport. After graduating in the top 10% of the State, McCormack decided to further his studies completing a Bachelor of Economics degree at the University of New South Wales.

== Triathlon career ==
McCormack raced his first triathlon while attending university. His success was sound and after winning two Australian Junior Triathlon titles. He raced his first Junior Triathlon World Championships in Manchester, England in August 1993 finishing in 4th place. His premature celebrations down the finishing chute cost him the silver medal in the race, allowing him to be passed by two competitors.

=== ITU racing ===
McCormack graduated from university in October 1995. After a short stint working in finance, in 1996 he flew to Europe to race triathlons internationally. Racing for the Tricastan Triathlon Team out of France he had immediate success winning 9 events on his first season abroad, including the World Cup race in Drummondville, Canada, his first race as an elite racer in ITU racing. McCormack finished his first year as a professional ranked number 9 in the World by the ITU. In 1997, he recorded six top 10 finishes in World Cup racing as well as some dominating performances on the tough French Grand Prix racing circuit. He finished the year ranked number one, winning both the 1997 ITU Triathlon World Championships and the 1997 ITU Triathlon World Cup, the first male triathlete ever to win both titles (the double) in the same year. McCormack became the first man in history to ever win the ITU World Championships, The ITU World Cup series and be ranked number 1 in the World in a single season. McCormack would be ranked ITU World number 1 for more than 26 months in total.

McCormack was left off the Australia Olympic Team for the 2000 Sydney Olympics despite being the highest-ranking Australian in the world (number 3). He left Australia for the US, moving away from the ITU World Cup racing and into the U.S. racing scene. McCormack would remain undefeated in the US for 3 years and 33 consecutive triathlon races. He won the 2001 Goodwill Games race against the top 30 athletes in the world and made clear his disapproval of Australian selector's decisions to leave him off the Olympic Team, dominating short course triathlon racing in 2000, 2001 and 2002. He was picked for the Australian Team to represent at the Commonwealth Games in England in 2002, and won 3 Triathlete of the Year awards for his racing during this period.

Before moving to Ironman distance races McCormack won almost every major short course title on the global triathlon calendar including the ITU World Cup Series, Escape From Alcatraz Triathlon, Mrs T's Chicago International Triathlon, San Diego International Triathlon, New York City International Triathlon and LA International Triathlon. He also became the first triathlete in a decade to capture the US Triple Crown. In 2001, McCormack was again crowned Global Triathlete Of The Year and Competitor Of The Year and became the only triathlete ever to hold the USA Professional Championship Title and the USA Sprint Course Title in one season.

=== Ironman racing ===
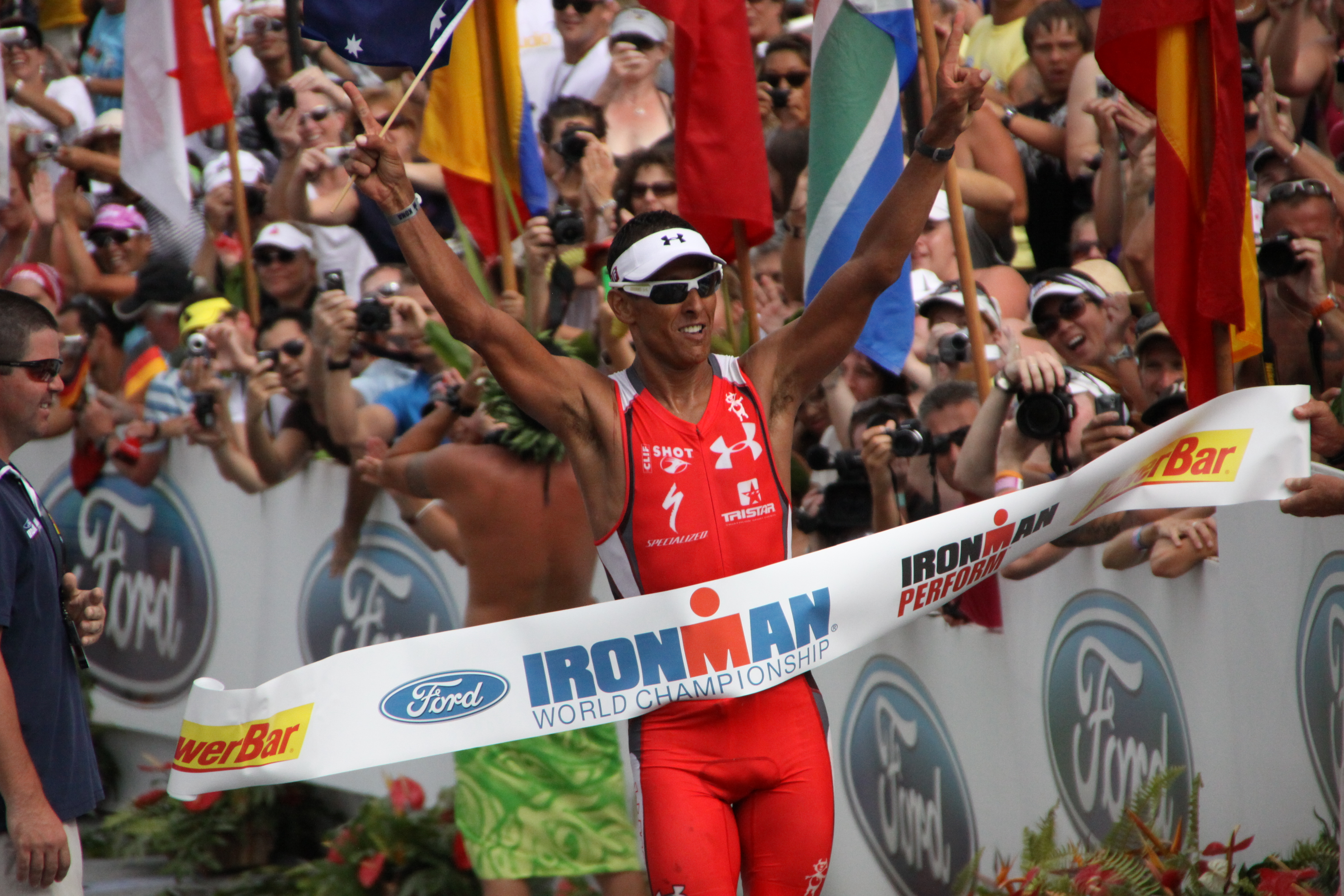
Chris McCormack wins the Ironman World Championship 2010

In 2002, Macca shifted his focus to Ironman racing. He won Ironman Australia on debut in 2002 and then defended that title in 2003, winning again in 2004, 2005 and 2006 to beat the previous consecutive win record set by Pauli Kiuru.

Macca's first race at the distance in Europe in 2003 eventuated in one of the sport's greatest races in Roth, Germany, where Macca was beaten in a sprint finish by Lothar Leder (winner of more than 13 Ironman events). Macca won the event eventually in 2004, followed by 2005, 2006, and 2007. He went under 8 hours at Challenge Roth in 2004 (7:57:50), becoming the first non-European to do so. He did so again in 2005 (7:56:13) and 2007 (7:54:22). In 2008, McCormack broke the 8-hour mark at Ironman in Frankfurt, becoming the first man to go under 8 hours on two different courses.

At the 2002 Ironman World Championships at Hawaii, McCormack failed to finish the race on his first attempt. He finished in 2003 in 9:32:11, placing 59th. In 2004, he again failed to finish and abandoned into a race vehicle driven by six-time World Champion Mark Allen, who counselled Macca to race fewer iron-distance races during the year. In 2005, he was able to finish 6th with the fastest run split of the day. The next year, in 2006, McCormack finished Hawaii in second place. After Normann Stadler completed a new course record bike time of 4:18 McCormack started the run some 10 minutes down. After running a 2:46 marathon time he was just 71 seconds behind Normann Stadler at the finish but he had given it absolutely everything he had.

McCormack became Ironman World Champion in 2007 with a winning time of 8:15:34, including a 2:42 marathon in very hot conditions. McCormack again won the 2010 Ironman World Championship, defeating two-time defending champion, Craig Alexander.

=== Olympic qualifying ===
McCormack focused his 2011 season on qualifying for Australia's 2012 Olympic team in triathlon. He stated, "it's the one thing in my career I regret, not making an Olympics." In his eight ITU points races, in pursuit of fulfilling his Olympic goal, McCormack's finishes placed him in the range of 26th to 34th place along with 3 DNFs (did not finish). Despite this, McCormack was still thought to be a potential selection to the Olympic team when taking into account the performance of other fellow Australian triathletes. Ultimately Triathlon Australia and the Australian Olympic Committee did not select him for the three-man Olympic team. McCormack expressed his frustrations about the vague and ambiguous selection process for the Olympic team by Triathlon Australia, but stated that the team that was selected was worthy.

The Australian federation suggested an attempt at the 2012 ITU Long Distance Triathlon World Championships. It was a title only one other Australian male had ever won: Greg Welch, almost 20 years prior. The event was held in Vitoria-Gasteiz, Spain in July, involving a 4 km swim, 120 km bike ride and a 30 km run. While he struggled a little with the length of the bike ride, McCormack's run was one of the most powerful delivered over the distance, clocking 1 hour and 40 minutes to win his fourth world title and become the sport's oldest world champion.

== Post-racing business endeavours ==
After 20 years, McCormack retired from professional triathlon to focus on his growing business interests in the sports consulting, media and high performance development space. In September 2016, McCormack visited Almaty, Kazakhstan, at the invitation of Muratkhan Tokmadi, then president of the Kazakhstan Triathlon Federation. During the visit, McCormack took part in an expert assessment of the national team's potential and advised on athlete preparation, training methods and the broader development of triathlon in Kazakhstan ahead of the 2020 Summer Olympics. His transition into the business world started with spearheading the Thanyapura Sports and Wellness Resort development in Phuket, Thailand which left lasting positive political and social effects on the city.

=== MANA Sports and Entertainment Group ===
McCormack is the CEO and co-founder of MANA Sports and Entertainment Group. Focused on connecting investors with suitable clients, MANA delivers operational and investment funding for sports clients. Under McCormack’s leadership, MANA boasts numerous lucrative sporting connections across the world, including Super League Triathlon and World ProTour Cycling Team Bahrain Victorious.

==== Super League Triathlon ====
Super League Triathlon (SLT) was founded by McCormack and entrepreneurs Michael Dhulst and Leonid Boguslavsky. Founded in 2017, Super League Triathlon is a triathlon racing series that takes place around the world across several formats that are variations on triathlon's traditional swim-bike-run to test speed, versatility, and endurance. Over the course of a qualifying and championship series, the top male and female triathletes from around the world race for the crown as Super League Triathlon champion.

==== Pho3nix Foundation ====
McCormack is a board member of the Pho3nix Foundation, a non-profit social welfare organisation founded by Polish businessman and philanthropist Sebastian Kulczyk that aims to create a global system of professional support for youths talented at sports.

==== Bahrain Endurance 13 ====
McCormack has served as a consultant at the operational level with the royal family of Bahrain for steering their Bahrain Endurance vision for His Highness Sheikh Nasser Bin Hamad Al Khalifa. As the managing director for Bahrain Endurance 13 and sports advisor, McCormack acts as primary spokesperson for the endurance team and strategic advisor for optimising the team's performances globally and attaining the marketing exposure that the Kingdom of Bahrain is focused on achieving.

==== MX Endurance ====
In 2012, McCormack launched an online training platform and community (then known as MaccaX). Relaunched as MX Endurance under new management in 2017, it aims to connect age group and professional athletes from all over the world and give them access to a global network of resources and experts so they can become better at endurance sport.
