= Markus Keller (triathlete) =

Swiss triathlete (born 1967)

Markus Keller (born 21 April 1967) is a retired male athlete from Switzerland, who competed in triathlon. Keller competed at the first Olympic triathlon at the 2000 Summer Olympics. He took eighteenth place with a total time of 1:50:15.25.
