= Erika Molnar =

Hungarian triathlete

Erika Molnar (born 15 July 1976 in Budapest) is an athlete from Hungary, who competes in triathlon. Molnar competed at the first Olympic triathlon at the 2000 Summer Olympics. She took twenty-third place with a total time of 2:05:39.50.

She competed again four years later at the 2004 Summer Olympics. Her time of 2:17:53.38 put her in thirty-eighth place.
