= Jenny Rose =

New Zealand triathlete (born 1964)

Jenny Rose (born 1964) is a former international triathlete from New Zealand. In 1994 she won three of the 10 races that made up the ITU Triathlon World Cup, and in 1995 she was the world long-distance champion.

== Biography ==
Rose was born and raised in Tākaka, Golden Bay on a dairy farm. She was the fifth of the seven children of Pat and Fran Rose. She received her education at Golden Bay High School. During her athletic career she was based in Christchurch, as well as, Paris during the NZ winter months. In 1993 she won the first of four ITU Triathlon World Cup events with a win in Embrun. In 1994 she won the ITU World Cup series with wins in three events- Ixtapa, San Sebastian and Gerardmer. In 1995, she won the ITU Long Distance Triathlon World Championship in Nice.

Rose attempted a comeback in 2014. She entered the Lake Wanaka Half on 18 January and came first in her age group (45–54). She was a finisher in the 2014 Swissman triathlon.

Later on, she lived in Wellington.
