= Hamish Carter =

New Zealand triathlete

Hamish Carter ONZM
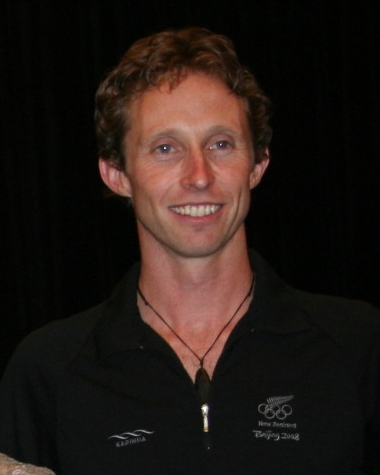
- Carter in 2008

Personal information
- Born: 28 April 1971 (age 55) Auckland, New Zealand

Sport
- Country: New Zealand
- Retired: 6 March 2007
Medal record
Men's triathlon
Representing New Zealand
Olympic Games
Gold medal – first place	2004 Athens	Individual
Commonwealth Games
Bronze medal – third place	2002 Manchester	Individual
ITU World Championships
Silver medal – second place	1997 Perth	Individual
Silver medal – second place	2006 Lausanne	Individual
Bronze medal – third place	1993 Manchester	Individual
ITU World Cup
Gold medal – first place	1998	Overall World Cup

Hamish Clive Carter ONZM (born 28 April 1971 in Auckland) is a New Zealand triathlete. He won the gold medal in triathlon at the 2004 Summer Olympics, his second Olympic games. Carter also competed on the International Triathlon Union World Cup circuit as a professional for many years, culminating in a silver medal in 2006 before announcing his retirement early in 2007. During his career he won twelve ITU world cup races.

Carter attended Auckland Grammar School where he was a successful rower, competing twice in the Maadi Cup. In 2026, 38 years later, former members of Auckland Grammar's 1988 crew (but not Carter himself) challenged the result of that year's Maadi Cup final, alleging that the winning Christ's College crew had used carbon fibre oars; Rowing New Zealand rejected a bid to reopen the result.

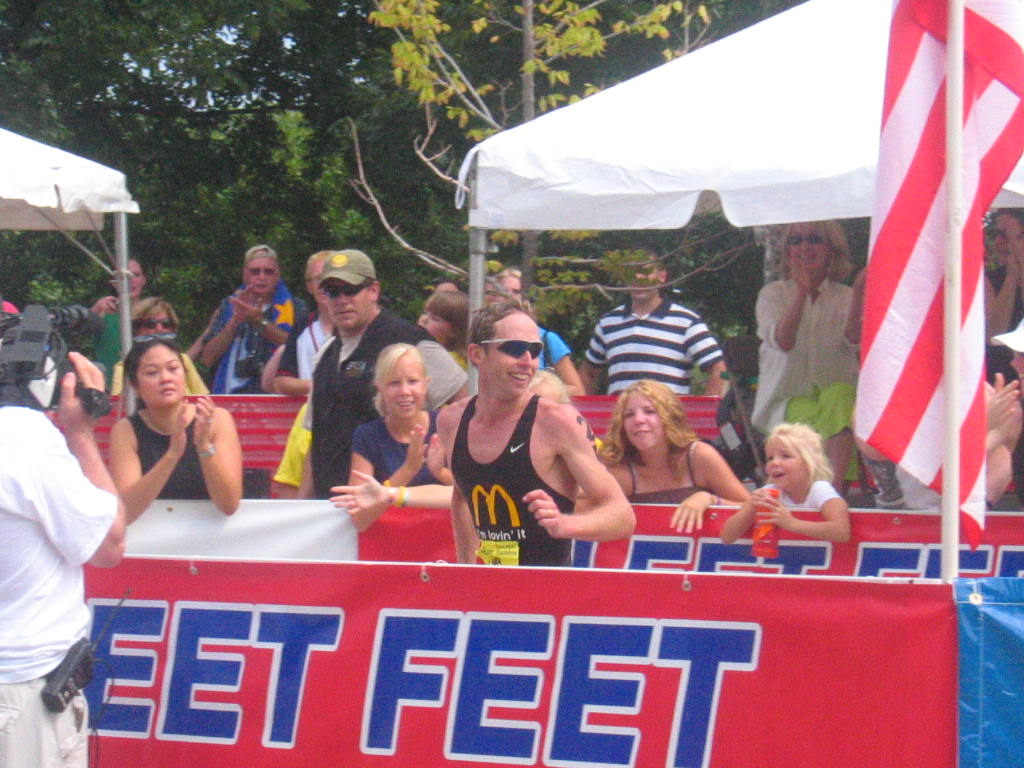
Carter winning the 2005 Chicago triathlon

Carter won the bronze medal in triathlon at the 2002 Commonwealth Games and then went on to win the triathlon gold medal at the 2004 Summer Olympics, defeating fellow New Zealander, Bevan Docherty. Carter's time was 1:51:07.73, less than eight seconds faster than Docherty's. On 3 September 2006 in Lausanne, Carter won silver at the World Championships after finishing 17 seconds behind Tim Don. In October 2006, Hamish Carter won the Xterra World Championship in Maui, Hawaii defeating a field of more experienced off-road triathletes.

On 6 March 2007 he announced his retirement.

Awards
Preceded by Ben Fouhy	New Zealand's Sportsman of the Year; 2004	Succeeded by Michael Campbell
