= Rina Hill =

Australian/British athlete (born 1969)

Rina Bradshaw-Hill (born 7 July 1969 in Brisbane, Queensland) is an Australian/British athlete, who competes in triathlon and international running.

Hill began triathlons at 23 years as cross training for her running. After winning the 1992 Brisbane Marathon (2:51:21), Hill changed careers to triathlons. She won her first seven triathlons, and represented Australia in six Triathlon World Championships:

Hill attended Brisbane State High School because of its successful athletics program and later Trinity College, Beenleigh (Yrs 11/12).

- 16th in Madeira in 2004 (rank 11th)
- 13th in Edmonton in 2001 (rank 4th)
- 12th in Perth in 2001 (rank 11th)
- 9th in Perth in 1997 (rank 8th)
- 8th in Cleveland in 1996 (rank 4th)
- 6th Wellington in 1996 (rank 9th)

Hill won the 1998 Long Distance World Championship in Sado Island, the 1994 Indoor Triathlon World Championship in Bordeaux, the 1998 and 1999 Aquathlon World Championships in Noosa, and the 1993 Hervey Bay Triathlon. She also competed in 14 Triathlon World Cups, winning five.

Hill took eleventh place in the 2004 Triathlon World Championships in Madeira, Portugal. She also competed at the second Olympic triathlon at the 2004 Summer Olympics, taking thirty-third place with a total time of 2:11:58.86.

Less than three weeks later, Hill won the Blackmores Sydney Marathon, which also doubled as the Australian championship. This win was Hill's second-ever marathon, coming after a 12-year hiatus from competitive running. Her winning time was 2:39.46.

Hill is married to Allister, a New Zealander, and they have two daughters, Richelle and Tamsyn.
