= 2000 ITU Triathlon World Championships =

International sports competition

ITU Triathlon World Championships
- Location: Perth, Western Australia, Australia
- Date: April 30, 2000

Champions
- Men: Olivier Marceau (Switzerland)
- Women: Nicole Hackett (Australia)

The 2000 ITU Triathlon World Championships was a triathlon competition held in Perth, Western Australia in Australia on April 30, 2000 and organized by the International Triathlon Union, now World Triathlon. This was the 12th edition of the competition inaugurated in 1989. The event crowned the world champions in elite and junior elite triathlon for the 2000 season.

All races for men and women consisted of a 1.5 km (0.93 mi) swim, 40 km (25 mi) bike and 20 km (12 mi) run, referred to as 'Standard' or 'Olympic' distance triathlon, significantly shorter than the classic Ironman Triathlon event.

The event was the final standard distance championship before the introduction of Triathlon at the Summer Olympics.

== Medal Summary ==
Event	Gold		Silver		Bronze	
Elite
Men	Olivier Marceau; Switzerland	1:51:39	Peter Robertson; Australia	1:51:53	Craig Walton; Australia	1:51:58
Women	Nicole Hackett; Australia	1:54:43	Carol Montgomery; Canada	1:54:49	Michellie Jones; Australia	1:55:25
Junior elite
Junior men	Frederic Belaubre; France	1:57:31	Leonid Ivanov; Russia	1:57:56	Dmitriy Smurov; Kazakhstan	1:58:30
Junior women	Anneliese Heard; Great Britain	2:10:05	Melanie Mitchell; Australia	2:11:27	Nicola Spirig; Switzerland	2:12:18

== Results ==
The following are the results of the elite races:

=== Men ===
Rank	Athlete	Nation	Swim	T1	Bike	T2	Run	Overall time
1st place, gold medalist(s)	Olivier Marceau	Switzerland (SUI)	18:02	0:43	1:00:18	0:46	31:43	1:51:39
2nd place, silver medalist(s)	Peter Robertson	Australia (AUS)	18:49	0:57	1:00:28	0:34	31:01	1:51:53
3rd place, bronze medalist(s)	Craig Walton	Australia (AUS)	17:57	0:43	1:00:23	0:34	32:15	1:51:58
4	Carl Blasco	France (FRA)	18:11	0:48	1:01:16	0:39	31:06	1:52:06
5	Hamish Carter	New Zealand (NZL)	17:57	0:46	1:00:21	0:37	32:25	1:52:13
6	Eric van der Linden	Netherlands (NED)	18:28	0:41	1:01:09	0:39	31:12	1:52:15
7	Hunter Kemper	United States (USA)	18:40	0:48	1:00:53	0:34	31:17	1:52:15
8	Stephan Bignet	France (FRA)	18:00	0:46	1:00:18	1:08	31:57	1:52:17
9	Dennis Looze	Netherlands (NED)	18:36	0:48	1:00:53	0:34	31:29	1:52:25
10	Greg Bennett	Australia (AUS)	18:38	0:43	1:00:52	0:34	31:35	1:52:25
11	Jamie Hunt	New Zealand (NZL)	18:34	0:46	1:01:28	0:31	31:04	1:52:28
12	Roland Knoll ^{(de)}	Germany (GER)	18:14	0:43	1:01:24	0:36	31:27	1:52:31
13	Andrey Glushenko	Kazakhstan (KAZ)	18:05	0:46	1:01:28	-	32:10	1:52:32
14	Andrew Johns	Great Britain (GBR)	18:37	0:41	1:00:57	0:34	31:42	1:52:35
15	Chris McCormack	Australia (AUS)	18:46	0:43	1:00:41	0:34	31:49	1:52:39
16	Lothar Leder ^{(de)}	Germany (GER)	18:54	0:43	1:00:42	0:36	31:42	1:52:42
17	Jan Rehula	Czech Republic (CZE)	18:38	0:51	1:00:46	-	32:24	1:52:43
18	Volodymyr Polikarpenko	Ukraine (UKR)	18:12	0:46	1:01:23	0:39	31:45	1:52:47
19	Reto Hug	Switzerland (SUI)	18:38	0:46	1:00:52	0:31	32:02	1:52:54
20	Markus Keller	Switzerland (SUI)	18:50	0:48	1:00:40	0:34	32:01	1:52:55
21	Jan Hansen	Denmark (DEN)	18:51	0:43	1:00:47	0:39	31:55	1:52:58
22	Andreas Raelert	Germany (GER)	18:13	0:43	1:01:17	0:36	32:18	1:53:11
23	Ivan Raña Fuentes	Spain (ESP)	18:29	0:46	1:01:06	-	32:51	1:53:14
24	Matthew Reed	United States (USA)	18:13	0:43	1:01:20	0:36	32:21	1:53:15
25	Stefan Vuckovic	Germany (GER)	18:55	0:43	1:00:42	0:36	32:29	1:53:31
26	Johannes Enzenhofer	Austria (AUT)	18:12	0:51	1:01:12	-	33:35	1:53:50
27	Craig Watson	New Zealand (NZL)	18:14	0:46	1:02:05	0:53	31:51	1:53:54
28	Fedor Filipov	Russia (RUS)	18:05	0:48	1:01:21	0:37	33:05	1:54:01
29	Eneko Llanos Burguera	Spain (ESP)	18:31	0:53	1:00:55	0:36	33:06	1:54:05
30	Shane Reed	New Zealand (NZL)	18:10	0:48	1:01:12	0:26	33:26	1:54:06
31	Hiroyuki Nishiuchi	Japan (JPN)	18:45	0:48	1:00:50	0:34	33:07	1:54:08
32	Courtney Atkinson	Australia (AUS)	18:05	0:48	1:01:22	0:34	33:18	1:54:13
33	Hideo Fukui	Japan (JPN)	18:49	0:46	1:00:43	0:37	33:36	1:54:34
34	Joachim Willen	Sweden (SWE)	18:10	0:48	1:01:23	0:36	33:42	1:54:42
35	Martin Krnavek	Czech Republic (CZE)	18:17	0:46	1:01:19	0:51	33:30	1:54:48
36	Laurent Jeanselme	France (FRA)	17:55	0:46	1:01:39	0:39	33:47	1:54:54
37	Peter Alder	Switzerland (SUI)	26:55	0:47	1:01:35	0:37	33:56	1:54:54
38	Jonas Djurback	Sweden (SWE)	18:17	0:41	1:01:16	0:37	34:01	1:54:58
39	Lieuw Boonstra	South Africa (RSA)	18:38	0:51	1:00:54	0:37	34:00	1:55:04
40	Christian Weimer	Germany (GER)	18:51	0:43	1:00:45	-	34:54	1:55:19
41	Arturo Garza Heiras	Mexico (MEX)	18:40	0:53	1:00:43	-	35:09	1:55:29
42	Vasilis Krommidas	Greece (GRE)	18:05	0:51	1:01:24	0:43	34:24	1:55:31
43	Stefano Belandi	Italy (ITA)	18:12	0:48	1:01:17	1:08	34:24	1:55:57
44		Denmark (DEN)	17:52	0:48	1:00:26	0:43	36:27	1:56:21
45	Martin Matula	Czech Republic (CZE)	19:02	0:48	1:03:25	0:43	32:47	1:56:46
46	Jose Uzziel Valderrabano	Mexico (MEX)	18:55	0:46	1:03:34	0:46	33:00	1:57:04
47	Norbert Domnik	Austria (AUT)	18:53	0:48	1:03:27	-	35:19	1:57:36
48	Conrad Stoltz	South Africa (RSA)	18:54	0:48	1:03:30	0:37	33:54	1:57:48
49	Petteri Kosonen	Finland (FIN)	18:48	0:51	1:03:32	0:41	34:07	1:58:06
50	Ralf Eggert	Germany (GER)	18:56	0:43	1:03:28	0:39	34:14	1:58:08
51	Takumi Obara	Japan (JPN)	18:14	0:43	1:01:21	0:39	38:37	1:59:39
-	Péter Hóbor	Hungary (HUN)	19:00	0:53	1:06:00	0:43	-	DNF
-	Greg Von Holdt	South Africa (RSA)	19:48	0:49	1:08:29	0:42	-	DNF
-	Philippe Fattori	France (FRA)	19:02	0:49	-	-	-	DNF
-	Sebastien Berlier	France (FRA)	18:57	0:49	-	-	-	DNF
-	Roland Melis	Netherlands Antilles (AHO)	20:06	0:51	-	-	-	DNF
-	Erik Johnsen	Norway (NOR)	19:07	0:45	1:09:14	0:47	-	DNF
-	Jose Miguel Barbany Montada	Spain (ESP)	19:55	0:58	-	-	-	DNF
-	Mikhail Kuznetsov	Kazakhstan (KAZ)	18:49	0:57	1:09:21	0:39	-	DNF
-	Stefan Timms	Canada (CAN)	18:57	0:49	1:09:19	0:42	-	DNF
-	Simon Whitfield	Canada (CAN)	18:45	0:45	-	-	-	DNF
-	Richard Allen	Great Britain (GBR)	18:46	0:51	-	-	-	DNF
-	Filip Ospaly	Czech Republic (CZE)	18:29	0:51	-	-	-	DNF
-	Hayato Suzuki	Japan (JPN)	18:55	0:51	1:06:09	-	-	DNF
-	Eligio Cervantes Islas	Mexico (MEX)	19:30	0:48	-	-	-	DNF
-	Joe Umphenour	United States (USA)	18:54	0:54	1:10:26	0:42	-	DNF
-	Paul Amey	Great Britain (GBR)	18:50	0:50	-	-	-	DNF
-	Daniel Fontana	Italy (ITA)	18:54	0:54	1:06:08	-	-	DNF
-	Raul Lemir	Argentina (ARG)	18:47	0:55	-	-	-	DNF
-	Fabrizio Ferraresi	Italy (ITA)	18:58	0:47	-	-	-	DNF
-	Juraci Moreira	Brazil (BRA)	18:56	0:48	-	-	-	DNF
-	Teppei Takeuchi	Japan (JPN)	19:00	0:46	1:07:55	0:40	-	DNF
-	Jose Maria Merchan Illanes	Spain (ESP)	18:47	0:51	1:06:18	0:39	-	DNF
-	Hektor Llanos Burguera	Spain (ESP)	18:47	0:51	-	-	-	DNF
-	Dmitriy Gaag	Kazakhstan (KAZ)	18:14	0:48	-	-	-	DNF
-	Jose Luis Zepeda	Mexico (MEX)	18:14	0:53	-	-	-	DNF
-	Miles Stewart	Australia (AUS)	18:57	0:45	-	-	-	DNF
-	Carlos Probert Maldonado	Mexico (MEX)	-	-	-	-	-	DNS
-	Javier Rosas Sierra	Mexico (MEX)	-	-	-	-	-	DNS
-	Alessandro Bottoni	Italy (ITA)	18:37	0:50	1:02:37	-	34:30	DSQ
Key : DNF - did not finish ; DNS - did not start

=== Women ===
Rank	Athlete	Nation	Swim	T1	Bike	T2	Run	Overall time
1st place, gold medalist(s)	Nicole Hackett	Australia (AUS)	18:53	0:51	1:07:07	0:34	27:12	1:54:43
2nd place, silver medalist(s)	Carol Montgomery	Canada (CAN)	19:28	1:03	1:08:18	0:37	25:21	1:54:49
3rd place, bronze medalist(s)	Michellie Jones	Australia (AUS)	19:23	0:41	1:08:34	0:32	26:11	1:55:25
4	Barbara Lindquist	United States (USA)	18:54	0:48	1:07:11	0:34	28:09	1:55:39
5	Anja Dittmer	Germany (GER)	20:03	0:46	1:07:49	0:37	26:22	1:55:46
6	Sheila Taormina	United States (USA)	18:52	0:51	1:07:12	0:39	28:12	1:55:50
7	Emma Carney	Australia (AUS)	20:11	0:48	1:07:44	0:39	26:31	1:55:55
8	Brigitte McMahon	Switzerland (SUI)	19:15	0:57	1:08:31	0:43	26:29	1:55:57
9	Akiko Hirao	Japan (JPN)	19:30	0:51	1:08:24	0:39	26:33	1:56:01
10	Siri Lindley	United States (USA)	19:28	0:48	1:08:26	0:36	26:40	1:56:01
11	Rina Bradshaw-Hill	Australia (AUS)	19:19	0:56	1:08:36	0:36	26:38	1:56:08
12	Magali Di Marco Messmer	Switzerland (SUI)	19:09	0:48	1:08:38	0:32	26:58	1:56:10
13	Haruna Hosoya	Japan (JPN)	20:07	0:48	1:08:14	-	26:58	1:56:10
14	Kiyomi Niwata	Japan (JPN)	19:41	0:50	1:08:14	0:36	26:51	1:56:14
15	Wieke Hoogzaad	Netherlands (NED)	19:32	0:48	1:08:21	0:36	26:57	1:56:16
16	Carla Moreno	Brazil (BRA)	19:31	0:48	1:08:26	0:34	27:04	1:56:28
17	Melissa Ashton	Australia (AUS)	19:36	0:46	1:08:25	0:34	27:07	1:56:33
18	Mieke Suys	Belgium (BEL)	19:43	0:53	1:08:04	0:34	27:25	1:56:42
19	Machiko Nakanishi	Japan (JPN)	19:23	0:51	1:08:31	0:34	27:28	1:56:51
20	Isabelle Mouthon-Michellys	France (FRA)	19:23	0:54	1:08:23	0:36	27:37	1:56:55
21	Sharon Donnelly	Canada (CAN)	19:19	0:54	1:08:26	0:36	27:38	1:56:56
22	Joanne King	Australia (AUS)	20:23	0:48	1:07:35	0:36	27:36	1:57:00
22	Kathleen Smet	Belgium (BEL)	19:36	0:51	1:08:15	0:41	27:34	1:57:00
24	Laura Bennett	United States (USA)	19:26	0:53	1:08:26	0:32	27:41	1:57:02
25	Nóra Edöcsény	Hungary (HUN)	20:06	0:57	1:07:42	0:41	27:37	1:57:08
26	Yukie Koumegawa	Japan (JPN)	19:16	0:53	1:08:35	0:34	27:51	1:57:10
27	Ute Mückel	Germany (GER)	19:22	0:46	1:08:34	0:32	27:54	1:57:13
28	Silvia Gemignani	Italy (ITA)	19:11	0:57	1:08:41	0:41	27:41	1:57:17
29	Jill Newman	United States (USA)	20:12	0:56	1:07:35	0:39	28:01	1:57:27
30	Sian Brice	Great Britain (GBR)	19:29	0:51	1:08:22	0:36	28:08	1:57:28
31	Nina Anisimova	Russia (RUS)	19:21	0:57	1:08:31	0:36	28:06	1:57:34
32	Sandra Soldan	Brazil (BRA)	19:25	0:51	1:08:24	0:48	28:07	1:57:39
33	Evelyn Williamson	New Zealand (NZL)	20:13	0:51	1:07:37	0:36	28:58	1:58:15
34	Marie Overbye	Denmark (DEN)	20:12	0:51	1:07:41	0:39	28:51	1:58:19
35	Manuela Ianesi	Italy (ITA)	20:12	0:51	1:07:45	0:39	28:48	1:58:20
36	Silvia Pepels	Netherlands (NED)	20:09	0:53	1:07:35	0:41	29:19	1:58:43
37	Becky Gibbs Lavelle	United States (USA)	19:08	0:53	1:08:47	0:36	29:25	1:58:50
38	Dominique Donner	South Africa (RSA)	19:35	0:56	1:08:16	0:36	29:30	1:58:58
39	Sibylle Matter Bruegger	Switzerland (SUI)	19:30	0:53	1:08:20	0:37	29:42	1:59:04
40	Jenny Rose	New Zealand (NZL)	20:14	0:53	1:07:35	0:41	29:49	1:59:15
41	Edith Cigana	Italy (ITA)	20:15	0:56	1:07:33	0:39	30:09	1:59:34
42	Maribel Blanco Velasco	Spain (ESP)	20:29	0:56	1:11:33	0:39	28:44	2:02:24
43	Renata Berkova	Czech Republic (CZE)	19:30	1:00	1:13:03	0:36	28:27	2:02:38
44	Lizel Moore	South Africa (RSA)	20:31	0:56	1:11:48	0:41	28:46	2:02:48
45	Beatrice Mouthon	France (FRA)	20:33	0:57	1:11:54	0:39	29:29	2:03:39
46	Ines Estedt	Germany (GER)	20:17	0:56	1:12:14	0:43	30:12	2:04:27
-	Heather Williams	Great Britain (GBR)	19:35	0:51	1:15:40	0:39	-	DNF
-	Joelle Tesche	Germany (GER)	19:28	0:50	-	-	-	DNF
-	Agnes Eppers	Bolivia (BOL)	25:06	1:12	-	-	-	DNF
-	Isabelle Turcotte-Baird	Canada (CAN)	20:58	1:02	-	-	-	DNF
-	Maria Carmenza Morales	Colombia (COL)	21:50	1:02	1:15:31	0:38	-	DNF
-	Jackie Gallagher	Australia (AUS)	21:52	-	-	-	-	DNF
-	Christine Hocq	France (FRA)	19:10	0:59	-	-	-	DNF
-	Mariana Ohata	Brazil (BRA)	19:34	0:52	-	-	-	DNF
-	Kim Carter	South Africa (RSA)	20:09	0:57	-	-	-	DNF
-	Shanelle Barrett	New Zealand (NZL)	20:38	0:51	-	-	-	DNF
-	Anikó Góg	Hungary (HUN)	20:41	0:55	1:13:56	0:34	-	DNF
-	María Luisa Martínez Álvarez	Mexico (MEX)	21:51	1:00	-	-	-	DNF
-	Hiromi Ogawara	Japan (JPN)	19:34	0:55	1:13:01	0:43	-	DNF
-	Nancy Kemp-Arendt	Luxembourg (LUX)	19:08	0:52	-	-	-	DNF
-	Lucienne Groenendijk	Netherlands (NED)	20:50	0:50	1:13:48	0:40	-	DNF
-	Carmen Ochoa	Mexico (MEX)	20:16	0:56	1:17:11	0:38	-	DNF
-	Ingrid Van Lubek	Netherlands (NED)	20:26	0:53	1:12:09	0:45	-	DNF
-	Anna Ivanova	Russia (RUS)	-	-	-	-	-	DNS
-	Gail Laurence	United States (USA)	-	-	-	-	-	DNS
-	Jasmine Hämmerle	Austria (AUT)	-	-	-	-	-	DNS
-	Stephanie Forrester	Great Britain (GBR)	-	-	-	-	-	DNS
-	Erika Molnár	Hungary (HUN)	-	-	-	-	-	DNS
Key : DNF - did not finish ; DNS - did not start

=== Junior ===
==== Junior men ====
(Top 10 only)

Rank	Athlete	Nation	Swim	T1	Bike	T2	Run	Overall time
1st place, gold medalist(s)	Frederic Belaubre	France (FRA)	18:32	0:56	1:05:23	0:31	32:07	1:57:31
2nd place, silver medalist(s)	Leonid Ivanov	Russia (RUS)	18:42	0:58	1:05:12	0:34	32:27	1:57:56
3rd place, bronze medalist(s)	Dmitriy Smurov	Kazakhstan (KAZ)	18:42	1:06	1:05:05	0:29	33:03	1:58:30
4	David Clarke	Australia (AUS)	18:42	0:51	1:05:22	0:26	33:22	1:58:46
5	Ryan Johnson	Australia (AUS)	18:42	0:58	1:05:06	0:24	33:46	1:59:02
6	Rene Gohler	Germany (GER)	18:31	0:58	1:05:22	0:31	33:55	1:59:20
7	Daiki Masuda	Japan (JPN)	18:40	0:58	1:05:15	0:37	33:56	1:59:30
8	Sven Riederer	Switzerland (SUI)	18:38	1:01	1:05:13	0:27	34:35	1:59:56
9	Evgeny Morozov	Russia (RUS)	18:32	0:56	1:05:26	0:31	34:28	1:59:58
10	Santiago Ascenco	Brazil (BRA)	20:10	1:01	1:04:35	0:27	33:48	2:00:06
Key : DNF - did not finish ; DNS - did not start

==== Junior Women ====
(Top 10 only)

Rank	Athlete	Nation	Swim	T1	Bike	T2	Run	Overall time
1st place, gold medalist(s)	Anneliese Heard	Great Britain (GBR)	19:07	0:56	1:11:59	0:26	37:34	2:10:05
2nd place, silver medalist(s)	Melanie Mitchell	Australia (AUS)	19:05	0:58	1:12:00	0:22	39:00	2:11:27
3rd place, bronze medalist(s)	Nicola Spirig	Switzerland (SUI)	21:11	0:24	1:14:04	0:29	36:05	2:12:18
4	Josie Loane	Australia (AUS)	19:05	0:58	1:11:59	0:24	40:27	2:12:55
5	Beatrice Lanza	Italy (ITA)	20:49	0:44	1:14:10	0:26	36:52	2:13:02
6	Marianne Braun	Germany (GER)	20:40	0:58	1:14:05	0:29	36:55	2:13:11
7	Pip Taylor	Australia (AUS)	19:05	0:56	1:11:59	0:22	41:10	2:13:38
8	Liz Blatchford	Great Britain (GBR)	19:09	0:58	1:11:55	0:24	42:56	2:15:26
9	Natasha Yaremczuk	Canada (CAN)	21:18	2:09	1:13:24	0:31	38:29	2:15:55
10	Saori Ohmatsu	Japan (JPN)	21:13	2:19	1:13:21	0:29	38:29	2:15:55
Key : DNF - did not finish ; DNS - did not start
