= 1999 ITU Triathlon World Championships =

International sports competition

ITU Triathlon World Championships
- Location: Montreal, Canada
- Date: September 12 1999
- Competitors: 138 (76 men, 62 women) (elite)

Champions
- Men: Dmitriy Gaag (Kazakhstan)
- Women: Loretta Harrop (Australia)

The 1999 ITU Triathlon World Championships was a triathlon competition held in Montreal in Canada on September 12 1999 and organized by the International Triathlon Union, now World Triathlon. This was the 11th edition of the competition inaugurated in 1989. The event crowned elite and junior world champions for the sport.

The elite and junior races for men and women consisted of a 1.5 km (0.93 mi) swim, 40 km (25 mi) bike and 20 km (12 mi) run, significantly shorter than the classic Ironman Triathlon event. The distance would come to be referred to as 'Standard' or 'Olympic' distance triathlon.

== Medal Summary ==
| Event | Gold | | Silver | | Bronze | |
|---|---|---|---|---|---|---|
| Men | Dmitriy Gaag; Kazakhstan | 1:45:25 | Simon Lessing; Great Britain | 1:45:31 | Miles Stewart; Australia | 1:45:47 |
| Women | Loretta Harrop; Australia | 1:55:28 | Jackie Gallagher; Australia | 1:56:00 | Emma Carney; Australia | 1:56:19 |
| Junior men | Courtney Atkinson; Australia | 1:49:04 | Christian Weimer; Germany | 1:49:24 | Ivan Raña Fuentes; Spain | 1:49:40 |
| Junior women | Anneliese Heard; Great Britain | 2:03:03 | Nicola Spirig; Switzerland | 2:03:26 | Josie Loane; Australia | 2:04:05 |

== Results ==
The following are the results of the elite and junior races:

=== Men ===
| Rank | Athlete | Nation | Swim | T1 | Bike | T2 | Run | Overall time |
|---|---|---|---|---|---|---|---|---|
| 1st place, gold medalist(s) | Dmitriy Gaag | Kazakhstan (KAZ) | 18:27 | 0:36 | 54:27 | 0:31 | 31:27 | 1:45:25 |
| 2nd place, silver medalist(s) | Simon Lessing | Great Britain (GBR) | 18:07 | 0:37 | 54:46 | 0:32 | 31:31 | 1:45:31 |
| 3rd place, bronze medalist(s) | Miles Stewart | Australia (AUS) | 18:15 | 0:36 | 54:35 | 0:29 | 31:54 | 1:45:47 |
| 4 | Andrew Johns | Great Britain (GBR) | 18:23 | 0:32 | 54:29 | 0:31 | 31:59 | 1:45:56 |
| 5 | Martin Krnavek | Czech Republic (CZE) | 18:05 | 0:41 | 54:45 | 0:34 | 31:53 | 1:45:58 |
| 6 | Reto Hug | Switzerland (SUI) | 18:38 | 0:34 | 54:13 | 0:26 | 32:11 | 1:46:02 |
| 7 | Simon Whitfield | Canada (CAN) | 18:37 | 0:34 | 54:22 | 0:29 | 32:02 | 1:46:02 |
| 8 | Hunter Kemper | United States (USA) | 18:10 | 0:34 | 54:46 | 0:29 | 32:05 | 1:46:03 |
| 9 | Filip Ospaly | Czech Republic (CZE) | 18:09 | 0:39 | 54:43 | 0:34 | 32:00 | 1:46:06 |
| 10 | Markus Keller | Switzerland (SUI) | 18:26 | 0:39 | 54:25 | 0:29 | 32:10 | 1:46:08 |
| 11 | Hamish Carter | New Zealand (NZL) | 18:00 | 0:36 | 54:49 | 0:29 | 32:14 | 1:46:10 |
| 12 | Greg Welch | Australia (AUS) | 18:11 | 0:39 | 54:37 | 0:32 | 32:15 | 1:46:12 |
| 13 | Craig Watson | New Zealand (NZL) | 18:04 | 0:41 | 54:44 | 0:34 | 32:09 | 1:46:13 |
| 14 | Lothar Leder | Germany (GER) | 18:41 | 0:31 | 54:18 | 0:29 | 32:18 | 1:46:19 |
| 15 | Volodymyr Polikarpenko | Ukraine (UKR) | 18:22 | 0:37 | 54:36 | 0:36 | 32:22 | 1:46:31 |
| 16 | Jan Rehula | Czech Republic (CZE) | 18:16 | 0:37 | 54:32 | 0:36 | 32:35 | 1:46:37 |
| 17 | Jamie Hunt | New Zealand (NZL) | 18:29 | 0:34 | 54:35 | 0:32 | 32:31 | 1:46:39 |
| 18 | Chris McCormack | Australia (AUS) | 18:36 | 0:36 | 54:19 | 0:29 | 32:43 | 1:46:42 |
| 19 | Nick Radkewich | United States (USA) | 18:15 | 0:36 | 54:38 | 0:34 | 32:43 | 1:46:44 |
| 20 | Shane Reed | New Zealand (NZL) | 18:03 | 0:36 | 54:48 | 0:29 | 32:58 | 1:46:52 |
| 21 | Tim Don | Great Britain (GBR) | 18:18 | 0:31 | 54:42 | 0:29 | 33:00 | 1:47:00 |
| 22 | Greg Bennett | Australia (AUS) | 18:15 | 0:37 | 54:38 | 0:34 | 33:04 | 1:47:06 |
| 23 | Sebastien Berlier | France (FRA) | 18:27 | 0:34 | 54:24 | 0:31 | 33:12 | 1:47:08 |
| 24 | Jan Hansen | Denmark (DEN) | 18:40 | 0:34 | 54:19 | 0:31 | 33:04 | 1:47:09 |
| 25 | Ralf Eggert | Germany (GER) | 18:29 | 0:31 | 54:26 | 0:29 | 33:15 | 1:47:10 |
| 26 | Johannes Enzenhofer | Austria (AUT) | 18:12 | 0:37 | 54:42 | 0:31 | 33:15 | 1:47:17 |
| 27 | Kris Gemmel | New Zealand (NZL) | 18:07 | 0:36 | 54:44 | 0:29 | 33:31 | 1:47:25 |
| 28 | Philippe Fattori | France (FRA) | 18:40 | 0:39 | 54:14 | 0:34 | 33:20 | 1:47:27 |
| 29 | Eneko Llanos Burguera | Spain (ESP) | 18:39 | 0:34 | 54:16 | 0:31 | 33:29 | 1:47:28 |
| 30 | Carl Blasco | France (FRA) | 18:12 | 0:44 | 54:32 | 0:34 | 33:27 | 1:47:30 |
| 31 | Fedor Filipov | Russia (RUS) | 18:16 | 0:41 | 54:38 | 0:36 | 33:21 | 1:47:30 |
| 32 | Stephan Bignet | France (FRA) | 18:28 | 0:34 | 54:25 | 0:34 | 33:33 | 1:47:34 |
| 33 | Hektor Llanos Burguera | Spain (ESP) | 18:17 | 0:39 | 54:40 | 0:39 | 33:25 | 1:47:37 |
| 34 | Brad Beven | Australia (AUS) | 18:05 | 0:36 | 54:46 | 0:31 | 33:48 | 1:47:46 |
| 35 | Stefan Vuckovic | Germany (GER) | 18:07 | 0:29 | 54:54 | 0:29 | 34:02 | 1:47:59 |
| 36 | Dennis Looze | Netherlands (NED) | 18:24 | 0:39 | 54:30 | 0:39 | 33:54 | 1:48:03 |
| 37 | Conrad Stoltz | South Africa (RSA) | 18:13 | 0:34 | 54:41 | 0:31 | 34:08 | 1:48:07 |
| 38 | Greg Von Holdt | South Africa (RSA) | 18:34 | 0:36 | 54:21 | 0:31 | 34:12 | 1:48:13 |
| 39 | Rob Barel | Netherlands (NED) | 18:42 | 0:34 | 54:10 | 0:22 | 34:29 | 1:48:16 |
| 40 | Matthew Reed | United States (USA) | 18:05 | 0:36 | 54:45 | 0:29 | 34:24 | 1:48:18 |
| 41 | Alec Rukosuev | United States (USA) | 18:03 | 0:36 | 54:56 | 0:39 | 34:06 | 1:48:21 |
| 42 | Jonas Djurback | Sweden (SWE) | 18:37 | 0:39 | 54:18 | 0:34 | 34:14 | 1:48:22 |
| 43 | Oscar Galindez | Argentina (ARG) | 19:22 | 0:39 | 53:31 | 0:49 | 34:07 | 1:48:27 |
| 44 | Michael Smedley | United States (USA) | 18:18 | 0:34 | 54:40 | 0:39 | 34:22 | 1:48:32 |
| 45 | Takumi Obara | Japan (JPN) | 18:37 | 0:39 | 54:16 | 0:31 | 34:31 | 1:48:32 |
| 46 | Marc Jenkins | Great Britain (GBR) | 18:17 | 0:36 | 54:40 | 0:34 | 34:31 | 1:48:40 |
| 47 | Laurent Jeanselme | France (FRA) | 17:56 | 0:39 | 55:02 | 0:34 | 34:37 | 1:48:45 |
| 48 | Stefan Timms | Canada (CAN) | 18:30 | 0:36 | 54:28 | 0:39 | 34:36 | 1:48:49 |
| 49 | Csaba Kuttor | Hungary (HUN) | 18:19 | 0:36 | 54:42 | 0:37 | 34:39 | 1:48:53 |
| 50 | Jose Uzziel Valderrabano | Mexico (MEX) | 18:46 | 0:34 | 54:16 | 0:44 | 34:35 | 1:48:55 |
| 51 | Ryan Bolton | United States (USA) | 19:25 | 0:39 | 55:17 | 0:31 | 33:23 | 1:49:16 |
| 52 | Juraci Moreira | Brazil (BRA) | 18:45 | 0:31 | 54:21 | 0:39 | 35:40 | 1:49:55 |
| 53 | Jose Luis Zepeda | Mexico (MEX) | 18:13 | 0:39 | 54:42 | 0:39 | 35:46 | 1:50:00 |
| 54 | Kevin Carter | United States (USA) | 18:39 | 0:36 | 54:01 | 0:31 | 36:13 | 1:50:01 |
| 55 | Roland Melis | Netherlands Antilles (AHO) | 19:19 | 0:36 | 55:29 | 0:32 | 34:24 | 1:50:18 |
| 56 | Ricardo Cardeno | Colombia (COL) | 19:13 | 0:36 | 55:33 | 0:31 | 34:47 | 1:50:40 |
| 57 | Jose Miguel Barbany Montada | Spain (ESP) | 19:17 | 0:34 | 55:33 | 0:34 | 35:22 | 1:51:19 |
| 58 | Raul Lemir | Argentina (ARG) | 18:44 | 0:39 | 54:19 | 0:36 | 37:15 | 1:51:34 |
| 59 | Samuel Pierreclaud | France (FRA) | 18:36 | 0:41 | 54:24 | 0:39 | 37:29 | 1:51:46 |
| 60 | Hideo Nakagome | Japan (JPN) | 19:18 | 0:43 | 55:22 | 0:34 | 36:02 | 1:51:58 |
| 61 | Petteri Kosonen | Finland (FIN) | 19:18 | 0:36 | 55:32 | 0:34 | 36:10 | 1:52:06 |
| 62 | Hiroyuki Nishiuchi | Japan (JPN) | 18:39 | 0:39 | 54:26 | 0:34 | 38:02 | 1:52:17 |
| 63 | Marcus Ornellas | Brazil (BRA) | 18:52 | 0:37 | 55:56 | 0:34 | 37:33 | 1:53:33 |
| 64 | Brian Bozarth | Hong Kong (HKG) | 18:30 | 0:34 | 54:29 | 0:34 | 40:10 | 1:54:18 |
| 65 | Carlos Lomba | Puerto Rico (PUR) | 18:38 | 0:48 | 56:00 | 0:39 | 38:26 | 1:54:30 |
| 66 | Junichi Yamamoto | Japan (JPN) | 18:48 | 0:39 | 55:57 | 0:31 | 40:02 | 1:55:55 |
| 67 | Hideo Fukui | Japan (JPN) | 18:46 | 0:41 | 55:55 | 0:32 | 43:47 | 1:59:40 |
| - | Chris Hill | Australia (AUS) | 18:09 | 0:37 | 54:43 | 0:38 | - | DNF |
| - | Gilberto Gonzalez | Venezuela (VEN) | 18:16 | 0:40 | 54:43 | 0:29 | - | DNF |
| - | Alessandro Bottoni | Italy (ITA) | 18:41 | 0:40 | 54:19 | 0:34 | - | DNF |
| - | Matias Brain | Chile (CHI) | 18:45 | 0:40 | 56:02 | 0:35 | - | DNF |
| - | Eric Van Der Linden | Netherlands (NED) | 18:35 | 0:35 | - | - | - | DNF |
| - | Jean-Christophe Guinchard | Switzerland (SUI) | 18:43 | 0:35 | - | - | - | DNF |
| - | Daniel Fontana | Italy (ITA) | 19:21 | 0:40 | - | - | - | DNF |
| - | Velmar Bianco | Argentina (ARG) | 19:28 | 0:35 | - | - | - | DNF |
| - | Mark Marabini | Zimbabwe (ZIM) | 22:18 | 0:48 | - | - | - | DNF |
Key : DNF - did not finish ; DNS - did not start

=== Women ===
| Rank | Athlete | Nation | Swim | T1 | Bike | T2 | Run | Overall time |
|---|---|---|---|---|---|---|---|---|
| 1st place, gold medalist(s) | Loretta Harrop | Australia (AUS) | 18:37 | 0:36 | 59:00 | 0:34 | 36:43 | 1:55:28 |
| 2nd place, silver medalist(s) | Jackie Gallagher | Australia (AUS) | 19:51 | 0:36 | 59:10 | 0:34 | 35:48 | 1:56:00 |
| 3rd place, bronze medalist(s) | Emma Carney | Australia (AUS) | 20:00 | 0:37 | 59:04 | 0:32 | 36:08 | 1:56:19 |
| 4 | Michellie Jones | Australia (AUS) | 19:49 | 0:36 | 59:11 | 0:34 | 36:08 | 1:56:19 |
| 5 | Joanne King | Australia (AUS) | 19:53 | 0:41 | 59:05 | 0:34 | 36:23 | 1:56:35 |
| 6 | Sian Brice | Great Britain (GBR) | 19:50 | 0:37 | 59:07 | 0:36 | 36:43 | 1:56:52 |
| 7 | Jennifer Gutierrez | United States (USA) | 18:39 | 0:39 | 58:56 | 0:36 | 38:16 | 1:57:05 |
| 8 | Mariana Ohata | Brazil (BRA) | 19:16 | 0:39 | 59:37 | 0:31 | 37:18 | 1:57:21 |
| 9 | Barbara Lindquist | United States (USA) | 18:36 | 0:39 | 58:58 | 0:32 | 38:38 | 1:57:24 |
| 10 | Mieke Suys | Belgium (BEL) | 19:55 | 0:39 | 59:01 | 0:36 | 37:19 | 1:57:27 |
| 11 | Isabelle Mouthon-Michellys | France (FRA) | 19:50 | 0:36 | 59:08 | 0:36 | 37:22 | 1:57:34 |
| 12 | Joelle Tesche | Germany (GER) | 18:40 | 0:34 | 58:58 | 0:29 | 38:58 | 1:57:39 |
| 13 | Akiko Hirao | Japan (JPN) | 20:02 | 0:39 | 58:57 | 0:36 | 37:35 | 1:57:50 |
| 14 | Michelle Dillon | Great Britain (GBR) | 20:42 | 0:39 | 59:55 | 0:22 | 36:17 | 1:57:56 |
| 15 | Joanna Zeiger | United States (USA) | 19:09 | 0:41 | 59:52 | 0:36 | 37:46 | 1:58:04 |
| 16 | Evelyn Williamson | New Zealand (NZL) | 19:19 | 0:43 | 59:36 | 0:37 | 37:57 | 1:58:09 |
| 17 | Haruna Hosoya | Japan (JPN) | 19:48 | 0:39 | 59:07 | 0:31 | 38:07 | 1:58:10 |
| 18 | Magali Di Marco Messmer | Switzerland (SUI) | 18:39 | 0:37 | 58:57 | 0:34 | 39:27 | 1:58:15 |
| 19 | Anja Dittmer | Germany (GER) | 19:56 | 0:36 | 59:04 | 0:39 | 38:01 | 1:58:15 |
| 20 | Susan Williams | United States (USA) | 19:15 | 0:41 | 59:39 | 0:36 | 38:10 | 1:58:20 |
| 21 | Nicole Hackett | Australia (AUS) | 18:37 | 0:37 | 58:58 | 0:32 | 39:44 | 1:58:28 |
| 22 | Sharon Donnelly | Canada (CAN) | 19:50 | 0:37 | 59:06 | 0:36 | 38:25 | 1:58:34 |
| 23 | Stephanie Forrester | Great Britain (GBR) | 20:01 | 0:44 | 1:00:31 | 0:22 | 37:10 | 1:58:48 |
| 24 | Ingrid Van Lubek | Netherlands (NED) | 20:01 | 0:36 | 59:01 | 0:44 | 38:33 | 1:58:57 |
| 25 | Anja Heil | Germany (GER) | 19:45 | 0:37 | 59:11 | 0:34 | 38:59 | 1:59:07 |
| 26 | Beatrice Mouthon | France (FRA) | 19:57 | 0:41 | 58:59 | 0:36 | 39:04 | 1:59:16 |
| 27 | Nóra Edöcsény | Hungary (HUN) | 20:02 | 0:44 | 1:00:31 | 0:27 | 37:32 | 1:59:16 |
| 28 | Kathleen Smet | Belgium (BEL) | 19:21 | 0:46 | 59:28 | 0:43 | 39:04 | 1:59:22 |
| 29 | Nathalie Daumas | France (FRA) | 20:00 | 0:41 | 58:58 | 0:36 | 39:09 | 1:59:24 |
| 30 | Erika Molnár | Hungary (HUN) | 20:22 | 0:41 | 1:00:12 | 0:29 | 38:01 | 1:59:42 |
| 31 | Kiyomi Niwata | Japan (JPN) | 20:06 | 0:41 | 1:00:30 | 0:26 | 38:13 | 1:59:55 |
| 32 | Sandra Soldan | Brazil (BRA) | 19:47 | 0:41 | 59:10 | 0:41 | 39:38 | 1:59:56 |
| 33 | Renata Berkova | Czech Republic (CZE) | 19:58 | 0:39 | 1:00:36 | 0:31 | 38:28 | 2:00:11 |
| 34 | Jasmine Hämmerle | Austria (AUT) | 21:49 | 0:39 | 1:00:13 | 0:36 | 37:10 | 2:00:25 |
| 35 | Maria Carmenza Morales | Colombia (COL) | 21:51 | 0:39 | 1:00:09 | 0:34 | 37:13 | 2:00:26 |
| 36 | Yukie Koumegawa | Japan (JPN) | 19:45 | 0:44 | 59:05 | 0:31 | 40:35 | 2:00:38 |
| 37 | Manuela Ianesi | Italy (ITA) | 19:59 | 0:44 | 58:57 | 0:37 | 40:26 | 2:00:40 |
| 38 | Karen Smyers | United States (USA) | 20:41 | 0:44 | 1:01:15 | 0:37 | 37:43 | 2:01:00 |
| 39 | Marie Overbye | Denmark (DEN) | 20:25 | 0:39 | 1:00:13 | 0:32 | 39:23 | 2:01:10 |
| 40 | Maribel Blanco Velasco | Spain (ESP) | 20:39 | 0:39 | 59:58 | 0:26 | 39:32 | 2:01:13 |
| 41 | Brigitte McMahon | Switzerland (SUI) | 19:53 | 0:43 | 59:06 | 0:43 | 40:53 | 2:01:16 |
| 42 | Machiko Nakanishi | Japan (JPN) | 19:13 | 0:37 | 59:43 | 0:36 | 41:08 | 2:01:17 |
| 43 | Isabelle Turcotte-Baird | Canada (CAN) | 20:02 | 0:41 | 1:00:28 | 0:34 | 40:08 | 2:01:53 |
| 44 | Nancy Kemp-Arendt | Luxembourg (LUX) | 19:13 | 0:43 | 59:48 | 0:36 | 41:39 | 2:01:58 |
| 45 | Beth Thomson | Great Britain (GBR) | 20:01 | 0:39 | 59:00 | 0:41 | 42:10 | 2:02:32 |
| 46 | Edith Cigana | Italy (ITA) | 20:27 | 0:36 | 1:00:14 | 0:31 | 41:09 | 2:02:55 |
| 47 | Natascha Badmann | Switzerland (SUI) | 21:52 | 0:36 | 1:00:12 | 0:31 | 40:48 | 2:03:58 |
| 48 | Oksana Zhuravkov | Israel (ISR) | 19:49 | 0:39 | 59:11 | 0:44 | 44:04 | 2:04:25 |
| 49 | Megan Evans | New Zealand (NZL) | 19:48 | 0:39 | 59:11 | 0:43 | 45:13 | 2:05:35 |
| 50 | Iona Wynter | Jamaica (JAM) | 21:09 | 0:44 | 1:00:47 | 0:44 | 42:44 | 2:06:09 |
| 51 | Francisca Rüssli | Switzerland (SUI) | 20:39 | 0:39 | 59:55 | 0:29 | 45:42 | 2:07:25 |
| 52 | Shanelle Barrett | New Zealand (NZL) | 20:26 | 0:37 | 1:00:15 | 0:29 | 46:22 | 2:08:10 |
| - | Christine Hocq | France (FRA) | 19:15 | 0:42 | 59:41 | 0:36 | - | DNF |
| - | Julie Ricketts | Great Britain (GBR) | 19:52 | 0:41 | 59:06 | 0:40 | - | DNF |
| - | Ines Estedt | Germany (GER) | 20:25 | 0:45 | 1:00:07 | 0:34 | - | DNF |
| - | Adriana Piacsek | Brazil (BRA) | 20:42 | 0:41 | 1:01:20 | 0:41 | - | DNF |
| - | Silvia Gemignani | Italy (ITA) | 19:18 | 0:42 | 1:04:24 | 0:44 | - | DNF |
| - | Nina Anisimova | Russia (RUS) | 19:15 | 0:43 | - | - | - | DNF |
| - | Siri Lindley | United States (USA) | 19:56 | 0:39 | - | - | - | DNF |
| - | Louise Soper | New Zealand (NZL) | 20:05 | 0:39 | - | - | - | DNF |
| - | Lizel Moore | South Africa (RSA) | 21:51 | 0:39 | - | - | - | DNF |
| - | Agnes Eppers | Bolivia (BOL) | 26:52 | - | - | - | - | DNF |
Key : DNF - did not finish ; DNS - did not start

=== Junior men ===
(top 10 only)

| Rank | Athlete | Nation | Swim | T1 | Bike | T2 | Run | Overall time |
|---|---|---|---|---|---|---|---|---|
| 1st place, gold medalist(s) | Courtney Atkinson | Australia (AUS) | 18:00 | 0:34 | 56:06 | 0:26 | 33:58 | 1:49:04 |
| 2nd place, silver medalist(s) | Christian Weimer | Germany (GER) | 18:04 | 0:34 | 56:01 | 0:27 | 34:17 | 1:49:24 |
| 3rd place, bronze medalist(s) | Ivan Raña Fuentes | Spain (ESP) | 18:41 | 0:36 | 56:25 | 0:27 | 33:31 | 1:49:40 |
| 4 | Stuart Hayes | Great Britain (GBR) | 18:03 | 0:32 | 56:05 | 0:29 | 34:48 | 1:49:57 |
| 5 | Frederic Belaubre | France (FRA) | 18:02 | 0:36 | 57:07 | 0:31 | 33:48 | 1:50:03 |
| 6 | Nathan Richmond | New Zealand (NZL) | 17:59 | 0:37 | 56:05 | 0:27 | 35:56 | 1:51:05 |
| 7 | János Szabó | Hungary (HUN) | 19:02 | 0:39 | 56:09 | 0:31 | 34:47 | 1:51:06 |
| 8 | Leigh Chapman | Australia (AUS) | 18:48 | nr | 56:17 | nr | 34:51 | 1:51:06 |
| 9 | Jacob Newell | Australia (AUS) | 18:11 | 0:34 | 55:58 | 0:29 | 35:57 | 1:51:07 |
| 10 | David Clarke | Australia (AUS) | 18:08 | 0:36 | 56:00 | 0:26 | 36:05 | 1:51:12 |
Key : DNF - did not finish ; DNS - did not start ; nr - not recorded

=== Junior women ===
(top 10 only)

| Rank | Athlete | Nation | Swim | T1 | Bike | T2 | Run | Overall time |
|---|---|---|---|---|---|---|---|---|
| 1st place, gold medalist(s) | Anneliese Heard | Great Britain (GBR) | 20:00 | 0:38 | 1:02:10 | 0:37 | 39:42 | 2:03:03 |
| 2nd place, silver medalist(s) | Nicola Spirig | Switzerland (SUI) | 21:33 | 0:43 | 1:03:01 | 0:34 | 37:38 | 2:03:26 |
| 3rd place, bronze medalist(s) | Josie Loane | Australia (AUS) | 19:23 | 0:36 | 1:02:49 | 0:36 | 40:45 | 2:04:05 |
| 4 | Annabel Luxford | Australia (AUS) | 19:58 | 0:36 | 1:02:14 | 0:35 | 41:18 | 2:04:38 |
| 5 | Delphine Py-Bilot | France (FRA) | 21:39 | 0:38 | 1:03:01 | 0:30 | 39:08 | 2:04:54 |
| 6 | Beatrice Lanza | Italy (ITA) | 21:07 | 0:41 | 1:03:31 | 0:35 | 39:04 | 2:04:56 |
| 7 | Lenka Zemanova | Czech Republic (CZE) | 20:34 | 0:54 | 1:03:51 | 0:39 | 39:02 | 2:04:58 |
| 8 | Marianne Braun | Germany (GER) | 20:35 | 0:38 | 1:04:07 | 0:39 | 39:16 | 2:05:12 |
| 9 | Saori Ohmatsu | Japan (JPN) | 20:58 | 0:35 | 1:03:50 | 0:33 | 39:47 | 2:05:41 |
| 10 | Anna Ivanova | Russia (RUS) | 20:03 | 0:51 | 1:04:23 | 0:35 | 40:40 | 2:05:54 |
Key : DNF - did not finish ; DNS - did not start
