= Triathlon at the 2000 Summer Olympics – Men's =

Men's Triathlon at the Games of the XXVII Olympiad
- Venue: Sydney Opera House
- Date: 17 September
- Competitors: 52 from 27 nations
- Winning time: 1:48:24.02

Medalists
1st place, gold medalist(s)		Simon Whitfield	Canada
2nd place, silver medalist(s)		Stephan Vuckovic	Germany
3rd place, bronze medalist(s)		Jan Řehula	Czech Republic

The men's triathlon was part of the Triathlon at the 2000 Summer Olympics programme. It was the first appearance of the event, making this an official debut at the 2000 Summer Olympics. The competition was held on Sunday, September 17, 2000 at the Sydney Opera House in Sydney.

== Competition format ==
The race was held over the "international distance" (also called "Olympic distance") and consisted of 1,500 metres (0.93 mi) swimming, 40 kilometres (25 mi), road bicycle racing, and 10 kilometres (6.2 mi) road running.

== Results ==
52 athletes competed in men's triathlon; only four of them dropped out of the cycling phase.

Rank	#	Triathlete	Country	Swimming	Cycling	Running	Total time^{*}	Difference
1st place, gold medalist(s)	18	Simon Whitfield	Canada	18:18.09	59:12.20	30:53.73	1:48:24.02	—
2nd place, silver medalist(s)	50	Stephan Vuckovic	Germany	18:35.59	58:52.10	31:09.89	1:48:37.58	+00:13.56
3rd place, bronze medalist(s)	32	Jan Řehula	Czech Republic	18:11.89	59:13.50	31:21.25	1:48:46.64	+00:22.62
4	36	Dmitriy Gaag	Kazakhstan	18:13.09	59:08.00	31:42.48	1:49:03.57	+00:39.55
5	8	Ivan Rana	Spain	18:12.39	59:10.40	31:48.09	1:49:10.88	+00:46.86
6	21	Miles Stewart	Australia	18:20.49	58:59.60	31:54.43	1:49:14.52	+00:50.50
7	45	Olivier Marceau	France	18:11.69	58:12.40	32:53.94	1:49:18.03	+00:54.01
8	24	Reto Hug	Switzerland	18:17.49	59:12.31	31:51.50	1:49:21.30	+00:57.28
9	2	Simon Lessing	Great Britain	17:44.79	59:39.60	31:59.93	1:49:24.32	+01:00.30
10	3	Tim Don	Great Britain	18:00.59	59:31.11	31:57.15	1:49:28.85	+01:04.83
11	44	Andriy Glushchenko	Ukraine	18:09.79	59:29.90	31:50.48	1:49:30.17	+01:06.15
12	51	Andreas Raelert	Germany	18:13.29	59:09.80	32:08.19	1:49:31.28	+01:07.26
13	33	Martin Krňávek	Czech Republic	18:11.39	59:21.60	32:05.02	1:49:38.01	+01:13.99
14	4	Leandro Macedo	Brazil	18:46.09	58:40.20	32:24.40	1:49:50.69	+01:26.67
15	43	Volodymyr Polikarpenko	Ukraine	17:59.89	59:37.20	32:14.69	1:49:51.78	+01:27.76
16	15	Craig Watson	New Zealand	18:05.09	59:18.50	32:38.26	1:50:01.85	+01:37.83
17	38	Hunter Kemper	United States	18:11.79	59:15.20	32:38.57	1:50:05.56	+01:41.54
18	25	Markus Keller	Switzerland	18:38.29	58:51.20	32:45.76	1:50:15.25	+01:51.23
19	46	Carl Blasco	France	18:06.19	59:18.21	32:53.62	1:50:18.02	+01:54.00
20	20	Conrad Stoltz	South Africa	18:47.39	57:38.60	33:58.40	1:50:24.39	+02:00.37
21	29	Takumi Obara	Japan	18:10.49	59:21.20	32:58.26	1:50:29.95	+02:05.93
22	5	Juraci Moreira	Brazil	18:49.49	58:45.41	33:09.89	1:50:44.79	+02:20.77
23	7	Eneko Llanos	Spain	18:44.39	58:43.90	33:20.06	1:50:48.35	+02:24.33
24	26	Jean-Christophe Guinchard	Switzerland	18:46.99	58:36.50	33:27.27	1:50:50.76	+02:26.74
25	39	Ryan Bolton	United States	18:31.49	59:06.70	33:14.76	1:50:52.95	+02:28.93
26	14	Hamish Carter	New Zealand	17:48.19	59:37.10	33:31.88	1:50:57.17	+02:33.15
27	22	Craig Walton	Australia	17:43.89	59:36.80	33:36.97	1:50:57.66	+02:33.64
28	48	Oscar Galindez	Argentina	18:50.59	59:20.60	32:48.29	1:50:59.48	+02:35.46
29	27	Johannes Enzenhofer	Austria	18:22.79	59:11.50	33:28.19	1:51:02.48	+02:38.46
30	35	Csaba Kuttor	Hungary	18:06.79	59:34.30	33:24.65	1:51:05.74	+02:41.72
31	47	Stephan Bignet	France	18:01.59	59:36.10	33:34.46	1:51:12.15	+02:48.13
32	19	Alessandro Bottoni	Italy	18:48.79	58:44.21	33:45.13	1:51:18.13	+02:54.11
33	41	Vassilis Krommidas	Greece	18:25.59	59:16.10	33:47.25	1:51:28.94	+03:04.92
34	23	Peter Robertson	Australia	18:47.49	58:40.90	34:10.65	1:51:39.04	+03:15.02
35	52	Joachim Willen	Sweden	17:48.89	59:43.20	34:08.71	1:51:40.80	+03:16.78
36	30	Hideo Fukui	Japan	17:57.29	59:32.50	34:35.00	1:52:04.79	+03:40.77
37	53	Gilberto González	Venezuela	18:54.49	58:40.40	34:38.14	1:52:13.03	+03:49.01
38	16	Ben Bright	New Zealand	18:14.99	59:11.80	34:50.47	1:52:17.26	+03:53.24
39	6	Armando Barcellos	Brazil	18:45.89	58:51.90	36:04.84	1:53:42.63	+05:18.61
40	40	Nick Radkewich	United States	18:44.09	58:54.50	36:06.04	1:53:44.63	+05:20.61
41	42	Matias Brain	Chile	18:56.59	58:46.30	36:02.01	1:53:44.90	+05:20.88
42	10	Eric van der Linden	Netherlands	18:22.19	59:10.40	36:59.45	1:54:32.04	+06:08.02
43	11	Rob Barel	Netherlands	18:34.69	1:03:32.00	33:30.00	1:55:36.69	+07:12.67
44	17	Jan Knobelauch Hansen	Denmark	19:23.69	1:02:48.90	33:29.47	1:55:42.06	+07:18.04
45	28	Roland Melis	Netherlands Antilles	19:21.19	1:02:47.80	34:02.96	1:56:11.95	+07:47.93
46	31	Hiroyuki Nishiuchi	Japan	18:15.79	1:03:57.20	34:46.77	1:56:59.76	+08:35.74
47	37	Mikhail Kuznetsov	Kazakhstan	18:55.09	1:04:39.20	35:39.21	1:59:13.50	+10:49.48
48	12	Dennis Looze	Netherlands	18:08.49	59:20.80	42:54.51	2:00:23.80	+11:59.78
—	1	Andrew Johns	Great Britain	18:15.69	Did not finish			
—	9	Jose Maria Merchan	Spain	18:55.49	Did not finish			
—	34	Filip Ospalý	Czech Republic	18:07.79	Did not finish			
—	49	Mark Marabini	Zimbabwe	20:41.39	Did not finish			

- * Including Transition 1 (swimming-to-cycling) and T2 (cycling-to-running), roughly a minute.
- No one is allotted the number 13.
- LAP - Lapped by the leader on the cycling course.
