= Czech Republic at the 2000 Summer Olympics =

- IOC code: CZE
- NOC: Czech Olympic Committee
- Website: www.olympic.cz (in Czech and English)

in Sydney
- Competitors: 125 in 19 sports
- Flag bearers: Martin Doktor (opening); Roman Šebrle (closing)
- Medals Ranked 28th: Gold 2 Silver 3 Bronze 3 Total 8

Summer Olympics appearances (overview)
- 1996; 2000; 2004; 2008; 2012; 2016; 2020; 2024

Other related appearances
- Bohemia (1900–1912); Czechoslovakia (1924–1992)

The Czech Republic competed at the 2000 Summer Olympics in Sydney, Australia. A total of 125 Czech athletes competed across different categories. The team ranked at the 28th place with a total of eight Olympic medals, two Gold, three Silver, and three Bronze.

== Medalists ==
Medal	Name	Sport	Event	Date
Gold	Štěpánka Hilgertová	Canoeing	Women's slalom K-1	September 18
Gold	Jan Železný	Athletics	Men's javelin throw	September 23
Silver	Petr Málek	Shooting	Men's skeet	September 23
Silver	Roman Šebrle	Athletics	Men's decathlon	September 28
Silver	Rudolf Kraj	Boxing	Light heavyweight	October 1
Bronze	Jan Řehula	Triathlon	Men's	September 17
Bronze	Martin Tenk	Shooting	Men's 50 m pistol	September 19
Bronze	Marek Jiras; Tomáš Máder	Canoeing	Men's slalom C-2	September 20

Medals by sport
Sport	1st place, gold medalist(s)	2nd place, silver medalist(s)	3rd place, bronze medalist(s)	Total
Athletics	1	1	0	2
Boxing	0	1	0	1
Canoeing	1	0	1	2
Shooting	0	1	1	2
Triathlon	0	0	1	1
Total	2	3	3	8

Medals by day
Day	Date	1st place, gold medalist(s)	2nd place, silver medalist(s)	3rd place, bronze medalist(s)	Total
7	September 17	0	0	1	1
8	September 18	1	0	0	1
9	September 19	0	0	1	1
12	September 20	0	0	1	1
13	September 23	1	1	0	2
13	September 28	0	1	0	1
17	October 1	0	1	0	1
Total		2	3	3	8

Medals by gender
Gender	1st place, gold medalist(s)	2nd place, silver medalist(s)	3rd place, bronze medalist(s)	Total	Percentage
Male	1	3	3	7	87.50%
Female	1	0	0	1	12.50%
Mixed	0	0	0	0	0.00%
Total	2	3	3	8	100%

Multiple medalists
Name	Sport	1st place, gold medalist(s)	2nd place, silver medalist(s)	3rd place, bronze medalist(s)	Total
—N/a		0	0	0	0

== Competitors ==
The following is the list of number of competitors participating in the Games:

Sport	Men	Women	Total
Athletics	13	11	24
Boxing	2	0	2
Canoeing	17	2	19
Cycling	7	1	8
Diving	1	0	1
Football	16+6*	0	22
Gymnastics	0	3	3
Judo	1	2	2
Rowing	1	0	1
Sailing	1	1	2
Shooting	8	1	9
Swimming	4	2	6
Synchronized swimming	0	2	2
Table Tennis	2	0	2
Tennis	4	3	7
Triathlon	3	1	4
Volleyball	2	4	6
Weightlifting	1	0	1
Wrestling	3	0	3
Total	92	33	125

* Six footballers (Erich Brabec, Petr Čech, Martin Čupr, Marcel Lička, Jan Polák and Luděk Stracený) were substitutes, but did not start.

== Athletics ==
Key

- Note–Ranks given for track events are within the athlete's heat only
- Q = Qualified for the next round by position in race or, in field events, by achieving the automatic qualification target
- q = Qualified for the next round as a fastest loser or, in field events, by position without achieving the qualifying target

Men
Track and road events

Athlete	Event	Heat		Quarterfinal		Semifinal		Final	
Athlete	Event	Time	Rank	Time	Rank	Time	Rank	Time	Rank
Roman Oravec	800 m	1:47.66	4	Did not advance					
Jiří Mužík	400 m hurdles	50.11	1 Q	—N/a		49.23	5	Did not advance	
Jiří Malysa	20 m race walk	—N/a						1:24:08	19
Miloš Holuša	50 m race walk	—N/a						3:53:48	16

Field events

Athlete	Event	Qualification		Final	
Athlete	Event	Result	Rank	Result	Rank
Miroslav Menc	Shot put	19.92	10 Q	19.39	10
Libor Malina	Discus throw	60.83	25	Did not advance	
Jan Železný	Javelin throw	89.39	1 Q	90.17 OR	1st place, gold medalist(s)
Vladimír Maška	Hammer throw	76.70	11 Q	77.32	8
Pavel Sedláček	Hammer throw	75.33	18	Did not advance	
Štěpán Janáček	Pole vault	5.65	14	Did not advance	

Combined events – Decathlon

Athlete	Event	100 m	LJ	SP	HJ	400 m	110H	DT	PV	JT	1500 m	Final	Rank
Roman Šebrle	Result	10.92	7.62	15.22	2.12	48.20	13.87	44.39	4.80	64.04	4:28.79	8606	2nd place, silver medalist(s)
Roman Šebrle	Points	878	965	803	915	899	991	754	849	799	763	8606	2nd place, silver medalist(s)
Tomáš Dvořák	Result	10.91	7.50	15.91	1.97	49.11	14.34	47.15	4.40	69.94	4:32.23	8385	6
Tomáš Dvořák	Points	881	935	846	776	856	931	811	731	888	730	8385	6
Jiří Ryba	Result	11.14	7.10	14.21	2.00	48.97	14.99	42.83	4.90	57.76	4:18.21	8056	14
Jiří Ryba	Points	830	838	741	803	863	851	722	880	704	824	8056	14

Women
Track and road events

Athlete	Event	Heat		Quarterfinal		Semifinal		Final	
Athlete	Event	Time	Rank	Time	Rank	Time	Rank	Time	Rank
Jitka Burianová	400 m	51.39	1 Q	50.85	1 Q	51.15	6	Did not advance	
Hana Benešová	400 m	52.85	4 Q	52.70	7	Did not advance			
Helena Fuchsová	800 m	1:58.97	3 Q	—N/a		1:58.82	3 Q	1:58.56	5
Ludmila Formanová	800 m	DNF		—N/a		Did not advance			
Hana Benešová; Jitka Burianová; Lenka Ficková; Helena Fuchsová	4 x 400 m relay	3:24.40	3 Q	—N/a				3:29.17	7

Field events

Athlete	Event	Qualification		Final	
Athlete	Event	Result	Rank	Result	Rank
Vladimíra Racková	Discus throw	60.24	14	Did not advance	
Nikola Tomečková	Javelin throw	59.49	12 Q	62.10	8
Šárka Kašpárková	Triple jump	14.34	5 Q	NM	
Zuzana Hlavoňová	High jump	1.94	10 Q	1.90	11
Daniela Bártová	Pole vault	4.30	=1 Q	4.50	4
Pavla Hamáčková	Pole vault	4.00	=22	Did not advance	

== Boxing ==
Athlete	Event	Round of 32	Round of 16	Quarterfinal	Semifinal	Final	
Athlete	Event	Opposition Result	Opposition Result	Opposition Result	Opposition Result	Opposition Result	Rank
Lukáš Konečný	Light welterweight	Allalou (ALG); L 9–17	Did not advance				
Rudolf Kraj	Light Heavyweight	Bye	Anderson (USA); W 13–12	Albert (NGR); W 8–7	Fedchuk (UKR); W 11–7	Lebziak (RUS); L 6–20	2nd place, silver medalist(s)

== Canoeing ==
=== Flatwater ===
Men

Athlete	Event	Heat		Semifinal		Final	
Athlete	Event	Time	Rank	Time	Rank	Time	Rank
Pavel Hottmar	K-1 500 m	1:44.391	6 QS	1:41.920	5	Did not advance	
Radek Záruba	K-1 1000 m	3:40.731	6 QS	3:44.347	6	Did not advance	
Radek Záruba; Pavel Holubář	K-2 500 m	1:33.490	5 QS	1:33.056	6	Did not advance	
Jan Andrlík; Jan Souček	K-2 500 m	3:20.760	5 QS	DSQ		Did not advance	
Pavel Holubář; Pavel Hottmar; Karel Leština; Jiří Polívka	K-4 1000 m	3:02.053	4 QS	3:02.851	4	Did not advance	
Martin Doktor	C-1 500 m	1:51.174	2 QF	Bye		2:37.467	8
Martin Doktor	C-1 1000 m	3:55.216	2 QF	Bye		4:02.335	8
Jan Břečka; Petr Procházka	C-2 500 m	1:44.175	4 QS	1:46.013	4	Did not advance	
Jan Břečka; Petr Procházka	C-2 1000 m	3:50.606	6 QS	3:51.012	8	Did not advance	

=== Slalom ===
Athlete	Event	Preliminary						Final					
Athlete	Event	Run 1	Rank	Run 2	Rank	Total	Rank	Run 1	Rank	Run 2	Rank	Total	Rank
Tomáš Indruch	Men's C-1	138.59	13	137.23	13	275.82	13	Did not advance					
Ondřej Štěpánek; Jaroslav Volf	Men's C-2	153.29	9	137.28	3	290.57	8 Q	126.27	8	127.09	5	253.36	5
Marek Jiras; Tomáš Máder	Men's C-2	142.74	5	141.33	5	284.07	5 Q	123.43	4	126.02	3	249.45	3rd place, bronze medalist(s)
Tomáš Kobes	Men's K-1	126.72	7	126.41	4	255.13	6 Q	114.23	7	112.76	5	226.99	7
Jiří Prskavec	Men's K-1	132.26	15	130.75	12	263.01	14 Q	121.82	14	112.84	6	234.66	13
Štěpánka Hilgertová	Women's K-1	143.56	2	141.51	1	285.07	2 Q	125.21	2	121.83	1	247.04	1st place, gold medalist(s)
Irena Pavelková	Women's K-1	146.47	3	144.07	4	290.54	3 Q	129.31	8	126.80	2	256.11	5

== Cycling ==
=== Road ===
Men

Athlete	Event	Time	Rank
Tomáš Konečný	Time trial	1:01:36	28
Tomáš Konečný	Road race	5:34:58	74
Pavel Padrnos	Road race	5:30:46	70
Radim Kořínek	Road race	DNF	
Ján Svorada	Road race	DNF	

=== Track ===
Time trial

Athlete	Event	Time	Rank
Martin Polák	Men's time trial	1:05.851	13

Sprint

Athlete	Event	Qualifying		1/16 finals	1/16 repechage	1/8 finals	1/8 repechage	Quarterfinal	Semifinal	Final / BM / Pl.	
Athlete	Event	Time Speed (km/h)	Rank	Opposition Time Speed (km/h)	Opposition Time Speed (km/h)	Opposition Time Speed (km/h)	Opposition Time Speed (km/h)	Opposition Time Speed (km/h)	Opposition Time Speed (km/h)	Opposition Time Speed (km/h)	Rank
Pavel Buráň	Men's sprint	10.370; 69.431 km/h	6 Q	Nagatsuka (JPN); W 11.102; 64.853 km/h	Bye	Villanueva (ESP); L	Eadie (AUS); Hill (AUS); L	Did not advance		Classification 9-12; Bērziņš (LAT); Arrue (USA); Hill (AUS); W 11.078; 64.994 km/h	9
Pavel Buráň; Martin Polak; Ivan Vrba	Men's team sprint	46.276; 58.346 km/h	11	—N/a				Did not advance			

Pursuit

Athlete	Event	Qualifying		Quarterfinal		Semifinal		Final / BM	
Athlete	Event	Time	Rank	Opposition Time	Rank	Opposition Time	Rank	Opposition Time	Rank
Lada Kozlíková	Women's individual pursuit	3:43.019	10	Did not advance					

Keirin

Athlete	Event	First round	Repechage	Second round	Final
Athlete	Event	Rank	Rank	Rank	Rank
Pavel Buráň	Men's keirin	1 Q	Bye	5	Did not advance

=== Mountain biking ===
Athlete	Event	Time	Rank
Radim Kořínek	Men's cross-country	2:21:08.59	29

== Diving ==
Athlete	Event	Preliminary		Semifinal				Final		Total	
Athlete	Event	Points	Rank	Points	Rank	Total	Rank	Points	Rank	Points	Rank
Jaroslav Makohin	Men's 3 m springboard	311.67	39	Did not advance							

== Football ==
=== Men ===
Roster

Head coach: (Czech Republic) Karel Bruckner

- Aleš Chvalovský
- Lukáš Došek
- Adam Petrouš
- Radoslav Kováč
- Roman Lengyel
- Roman Týce
- Libor Sionko
- Tomáš Ujfaluši
- Marek Jankulovski
- Tomáš Kučera
- Milan Baroš
- Jan Polák
- Erich Brabec
- Libor Došek
- Martin Vozábal
- Jan Šimák
- Marek Heinz
- Jaroslav Drobný
- Marcel Lička
- Luděk Stracený
- Martin Čupr
- Petr Čech

Group play

Team	Pld	W	D	L	GF	GA	GD	Pts
United States	3	1	2	0	6	4	+2	5
Cameroon	3	1	2	0	5	4	+1	5
Kuwait	3	1	0	2	6	8	−2	3
Czech Republic	3	0	2	1	5	6	−1	2

13 September 2000
20:00

United States	2–2	Czech Republic
Albright 21'; Wolff 44'	Report	Jankulovski 28'; Došek 52' (pen.)

Bruce Stadium, Canberra
Attendance: 24,800
Referee: Carlos Simon (Brazil)

16 September 2000
19:00

Czech Republic	2–3	Kuwait
Heinz 2'; Lengyel 90+1'	Report	Mutairi 56'; Saeed 64', 73'

Brisbane Cricket Ground, Brisbane
Attendance: 22,182
Referee: Mourad Daami (Tunisia)

19 September 2000
19:00

Czech Republic	1–1	Cameroon
Došek 74'	Report	Lauren 24'

Brisbane Cricket Ground, Brisbane
Attendance: 23,442
Referee: Simon Micallef (Australia)

== Gymnastics ==
=== Artistic ===
- Jana Komrsková
- Katerina Maresova

=== Trampoline ===
- Petra Vachníková

== Judo ==
- Michaela Vernerová
- Andrea Pokorná
- Petr Jákl

== Rowing ==
The Czech Republic had one rower participate in one of the fourteen events in 2000.

Athlete	Event	Heat		Repechage		Semifinal		Final	
Athlete	Event	Time	Rank	Time	Rank	Time	Rank	Time	Rank
Václav Chalupa	Men's Single sculls	7:04.00	2 R	7:17.53	2 SAB	7:30.28	6 FB	DNS	

Qualification Legend: FA=Final A (medal); FB=Final B (non-medal); FC=Final C (non-medal); FD=Final D (non-medal); FE=Final E (non-medal); FF=Final F (non-medal); SA/B=Semifinals A/B; SC/D=Semifinals C/D; SE/F=Semifinals E/F; QF=Quarterfinals; R=Repechage

== Sailing ==
Athlete	Event	Race											Net points	Rank
Athlete	Event	1	2	3	4	5	6	7	8	9	10	11	Net points	Rank
Michael Maier	Men's Finn	8	19	12	~~24~~	17	~~26~~; ~~DNF~~	17	12	15	17	19	136	19
Lenka Šmídová	Europe	~~15~~	~~19~~	15	7	8	3	13	2	15	10	2	75	7

== Shooting ==
Men

Athlete	Event	Qualification		Final		Total	
Athlete	Event	Points	Rank	Points	Rank	Points	Rank
Václav Bečvář	50 m rifle three positions	1161	=15	Did not advance			
Radim Novak	50 m rifle three positions	1161	=15	Did not advance			
Václav Bečvář	50 m rifle prone	597	3 Q	102.7	4	699.7	5
Radim Novak	50 m rifle prone	588	=38	Did not advance			
Václav Bečvář	10 m air rifle	585	34	Did not advance			
Radim Novak	10 m air rifle	581	43	Did not advance			
Martin Tenk	50 m pistol	566	3 Q	96.5	4	662.5	3rd place, bronze medalist(s)
Martin Tenk	10 m air pistol	578	11	Did not advance			
David Kostelecký	Trap	116	3 Q	22	6	138	6
Jiří Gach	Trap	106	32	Did not advance			
Jiří Gach	Double trap	130	16	Did not advance			
Bronislav Bechynsky	Skeet	118	32	Did not advance			
Petr Málek	Skeet	124	2 Q	24	=3	146	2nd place, silver medalist(s)
Miroslav Januš	10 m running target	575	6 Q	91.8	7	666.8	8

Women

Athlete	Event	Qualification		Final		Total	
Athlete	Event	Points	Rank	Points	Rank	Points	Rank
Lucie Valová	50 m rifle three positions	577	14	Did not advance			
Lucie Valová	10 m air rifle	388	=36	Did not advance			

== Swimming ==
Men

Athlete	Event	Heat		Semifinal		Final	
Athlete	Event	Time	Rank	Time	Rank	Time	Rank
Květoslav Svoboda	100 m freestyle	52.18	45	Did not advance			
Květoslav Svoboda	200 m freestyle	1:50.29	18	Did not advance			
Vlastimil Burda	400 m freestyle	3:54.40	19	Did not advance			
Vlastimil Burda	1500 m freestyle	15:33.25	26	—N/a		Did not advance	
Jan Víťazka	100 m butterfly	54.34	27	Did not advance			
Daniel Málek	100 m breaststroke	1:01.56	2 Q	1:01.60	5 Q	1:01.50	5
Daniel Málek	200 m breaststroke	2:14.10	2 Q	2:13.46	4 Q	2:13.20	5
Jan Víťazka	200 m individual medley	2:03.66	21	—N/a		Did not advance	
Jan Víťazka	400 m individual medley	4:23.81	23	—N/a		Did not advance	

Women

Athlete	Event	Heat		Semifinal		Final	
Athlete	Event	Time	Rank	Time	Rank	Time	Rank
Ilona Hlaváčková	100 m freestyle	57.24	26	Did not advance			
Ilona Hlaváčková	100 m backstroke	1:03.28	22	Did not advance			
Hana Černá	400 m freestyle	4:17.96	26	—N/a		Did not advance	
Hana Černá	800 m freestyle	8:47.64	19	—N/a		Did not advance	
Hana Černá	200 m individual medley	2:17.58	17	—N/a		Did not advance	
Hana Černá	400 m individual medley	4:44.11	9	—N/a		Did not advance	

== Synchronized swimming ==
Athlete	Event	Technical routine		Free routine (preliminary)				Free routine (final)		Total	
Athlete	Event	Points	Rank	Points	Rank	Total	Rank	Points	Rank	Points	Rank
Soňa Bernardová; Jana Rybářová	Duet	31.033	14	57.704	15	88.537	15	Did not advance			

== Table tennis ==
- Josef Plachý
- Petr Korbel

== Tennis ==
- Jiří Vaněk
- David Rikl
- Jiří Novák
- Ctislav Doseděl
- Květoslava Hrdličková
- Adriana Gerši
- Dája Bedáňová

== Triathlon ==
The Czech Republic captured one of the first Olympic triathlon medals when Jan Řehula passed ten other competitors during the final phase of the race to win the bronze medal. Two other Czech triathletes finished the race, while a fourth competitor withdrew during the cycling phase.

Athlete	Event	Swim	Trans. 1	Cycle	Trans. 2	Run	Total	Rank
Jan Řehula	Men's	17:45.39	26.50	58:54.00	19.50	31:21.25	1:48:46.64	3rd place, bronze medalist(s)
Martin Krňávek	Men's	17:50.09	21.30	59:00.30	21.30	32:05.02	1:49:38.01	13
Filip Ospalý	Men's	17:41.89	25.90	Did not finish				
Renata Berková	Women's	19:18.38	30.40	1:09:25.60	23.70	38:30.29	2:08:08.37	29

== Volleyball ==
=== Beach ===
Athlete	Event	Preliminary round	Preliminary elimination		Round of 16	Quarterfinals	Semifinals	Final / BM	
Athlete	Event	Opposition Score	Opposition Score	Opposition Score	Opposition Score	Opposition Score	Opposition Score	Opposition Score	Rank
Martin Lebl; Michal Palinek	Men's	P Laciga – M Laciga (SUI); L 13–15	Oetke – Scheuerpflug (GER); W 15–8	Dieze – Bosma (ESP); L 4–15	Did not advance				=17
Eva Celbová; Sona Novaková	Women's	Kadijk – Schoon-Kadijk (NED); W 17–15 Q	Bye		Takahashi – Saiki (JPN); L 17–15	Did not advance			=9
Martina Hudcová; Tereza Tobiasová	Women's	May-Treanor – McPeak (USA); L 5–15	Did not advance						=19

== Weightlifting ==
Athlete	Event	Snatch			Clean & Jerk			Total	Rank
Athlete	Event	1	2	3	1	2	3	Total	Rank
Petr Sobotka	Men's +105 kg	170.0	175.0	~~180.0~~	210.0	215.0	217.5	392.5	14

== Wrestling ==
- David Vála
- Petr Švehla
- Marek Švec
