= 1994 European Triathlon Championships =

1994 edition of the European Triathlon Championships

- Venue: Eichstätt, Germany
- Dates: 2 July 1994
- Competitors: 114 (59 men, 54 women)

Champions
- Men: Simon Lessing (GBR) (3rd title)
- Women: Sonja Krolik (GER) (2nd title)

The 1994 European Triathlon Championships, officially the 1994 Eichstätt ETU Triathlon European Championships, was the 10th edition of the European Triathlon Championships, and was held in Eichstätt, Germany, on 2 July 1994. This was the second time the event was held in Germany, though the first since reunification, after the inaugural championships in Immenstadt in 1985.

The event crowned European champions in 'standard' or 'Olympic' distance triathlon for the season.

== Format ==
The competition was organised by European Triathlon Union (ETU) over the standard Olympic triathlon distance of a 1,500 m (1,600 yd) swim, a 40 km (25 mi) cycle, and a 10 km (6.2 mi) run.

== Medal summary ==
Event	Gold		Silver		Bronze	
Men's individual	Simon Lessing; Great Britain	1:50:38	Ralf Eggert; Germany	1:52:33	Rainer Müller-Hörner; Germany	1:53:37
Women's individual	Sonja Krolik; Germany	2:02:51	Sabine Westhoff; Germany	2:05:22	Isabelle Mouthon-Michellys; France	2:05:58

== Medal table ==
* Host nation (Germany)

Rank	Nation	Gold	Silver	Bronze	Total
1	Germany (GER)*	1	2	1	4
2	Great Britain (GBR)	1	0	0	1
3	France (FRA)	0	0	1	1
Totals (3 entries)		2	2	2	6

== Results ==
=== Men ===
Simon Lessing of Great Britain defended his title to win his second consecutive men's European championship, and third overall, finishing ahead of German pair Ralf Eggert and Rainer Müller-Hörner.

Rank	Athlete	Nation	Swim	Bike	Run	Overall time
1st place, gold medalist(s)	Simon Lessing	Great Britain	19:19	58:16	33:02	1:50:38
2nd place, silver medalist(s)	Ralf Eggert	Germany	19:53	58:42	33:58	1:52:33
3rd place, bronze medalist(s)	Rainer Müller-Hörner	Germany	20:53	58:45	33:58	1:53:37
4	Christoph Mauch	Switzerland	20:51	58:35	34:53	1:54:20
5	Arnd Schomburg	Germany	20:36	58:56	35:07	1:54:40
6	Dennis Looze	Netherlands	19:35	1:01:03	34:14	1:54:55
7	Stephane Sansorgne	France	20:43	1:00:56	33:19	1:54:59
8	Sylvain Dafflon	France	20:00	59:36	35:36	1:55:12
9	Rob Barel	Netherlands	21:07	59:24	34:50	1:55:21
10	Normann Stadler	Germany	21:11	59:14	35:03	1:55:29
11	Luc Van Lierde	Belgium	19:36	1:01:40	34:14	1:55:33
12	Roland Knoll	Germany	19:57	1:01:07	34:29	1:55:34
13	Jiri Seidl	Czech Republic	21:30	58:44	35:40	1:55:54
14	Dmitriy Gaag	Kazakhstan	20:01	1:01:41	34:14	1:55:58
15	Markus Keller	Switzerland	21:11	1:00:13	34:53	1:56:19
16	Philippe Fattori	France	21:09	1:00:39	34:36	1:56:24
17	Henrik Nöbbelin	Sweden	21:08	1:00:28	34:52	1:56:28
18	Martin Matula	Czech Republic	21:21	58:59	36:16	1:56:37
19	Tomas Kocar	Czech Republic	19:39	00:00	37:06	1:56:46
20	Alexander Merzlov	Russia	19:16	1:03:41	33:48	1:56:46
21	Tibor Lehmann	Hungary	22:08	1:00:47	34:17	1:57:14
22	Koen Hoeyberghs	Belgium	22:01	1:00:01	35:23	1:57:26
23	Peter-Johan Dillo	Netherlands	21:01	59:38	36:49	1:57:29
24	Vasilis Krommidas	Greece	21:15	1:00:06	36:14	1:57:35
25	Aleksei Konoplev	Russia	20:00	1:01:52	35:46	1:57:40
26	Jean-Christophe Guinchard	Switzerland	20:58	1:00:26	36:28	1:57:54
27	Eimert Venderbosch	Netherlands	21:27	1:00:58	35:42	1:58:08
28	Steven Van Herzele	Belgium	20:59	1:00:39	36:31	1:58:10
29	Dominik Rechsteiner	Switzerland	22:48	1:00:07	35:15	1:58:11
30	Tom Soderdahl	Finland	21:52	1:01:00	35:35	1:58:30
31	Carlos Brito	Portugal	22:22	1:00:28	35:55	1:58:46
32	Peter Alder	Switzerland	20:43	59:45	38:22	1:58:50
33	Jan Rehula	Czech Republic	20:35	1:00:56	37:31	1:59:02
34	Andriy Yastrebov	Ukraine	22:21	1:00:38	36:29	1:59:28
35	Mark Edmonds	Great Britain	20:40	1:02:21	36:44	1:59:45
36	Mika Somppi	Finland	21:39	1:01:21	37:07	2:00:07
37	Craig Ball	Great Britain	22:02	1:00:49	37:20	2:00:11
38	Andrey Makushin	Russia	21:11	1:02:28	36:42	2:00:21
39	Péter Hóbor	Hungary	21:03	1:02:18	37:15	2:00:36
40	Jorge Puebla Garcia	Spain	21:27	1:01:43	37:40	2:00:50
41	Stefan Vuckovic	Germany	20:26	1:02:40	37:49	2:00:55
42	Rolf Kristian Roll	Norway	22:22	1:01:53	36:45	2:01:00
43	Bent Andersen	Denmark	21:34	1:04:35	34:56	2:01:05
44	Johan Callebaut	Belgium	20:52	1:02:08	38:12	2:01:12
45	Gianpietro De Faveri	Italy	19:46	1:02:02	39:32	2:01:20
46	Jose Miguel Barbany Montada	Spain	21:27	1:03:16	36:43	2:01:26
47	Julian Jenkinson	Great Britain	23:02	1:02:26	36:07	2:01:35
48	Ferran Aviles Tahull	Spain	22:04	1:03:36	36:08	2:01:48
49	Petteri Kosonen	Finland	21:38	1:02:48	37:28	2:01:54
50	Borja Oses García	Spain	21:44	1:01:59	38:12	2:01:55
51	Antonio Antunes	Portugal	20:49	1:04:39	36:28	2:01:56
52	Piotr Gritzner	Poland	20:54	1:02:41	38:47	2:02:22
53	Matteo Mormorunni	Italy	21:54	1:02:38	37:57	2:02:29
54	Ian Hamilton	Great Britain	21:29	1:01:39	39:22	2:02:30
55	Damjan Zepic	Slovenia	21:47	1:04:18	36:55	2:03:00
56	Petteri Mustonen	Finland	22:59	1:05:48	34:42	2:03:29
57	Joachim Willen	Sweden	19:53	1:04:11	40:31	2:04:35
58	Ulrich Katzer	Austria	23:40	1:04:15	36:44	2:04:39
59	Eugene Galbraith	Ireland	22:00	1:04:14	38:27	2:04:41

* transition zone times were not recorded separately for this event.

=== Women ===
In the women's race, Germany's Sonja Krolik captured the gold medal for the hosts, regaining the title she had previously won in 1992. She followed by defending champion and compatriot Simone Westhoff in a host nation 1-2, with Isabelle Mouthon-Michellys of France completing the podium in third.

Rank	Athlete	Nation	Swim	Bike	Run	Overall time
1st place, gold medalist(s)	Sonja Krolik	Germany	23:46	1:03:17	35:46	2:02:51
2nd place, silver medalist(s)	Simone Westhoff	Germany	21:08	1:04:57	39:18	2:05:22
3rd place, bronze medalist(s)	Isabelle Mouthon-Michellys	France	21:54	1:06:06	37:57	2:05:58
4	Anette Pedersen	Denmark	22:35	1:04:48	39:30	2:06:53
5	Ute Schaefer	Germany	23:37	1:03:50	40:28	2:07:55
6	Jeannine De Ruysscher	Belgium	22:13	1:06:05	39:58	2:08:15
7	Simone Mortier	Germany	23:07	1:06:53	39:20	2:09:21
8	Mieke Suys	Belgium	22:07	1:07:02	40:40	2:09:49
9	Maria Malin	Sweden	22:39	1:09:02	38:12	2:09:52
10	Suzanne Nielsen	Denmark	22:16	1:07:56	40:06	2:10:18
11	Natascha Badmann	Switzerland	25:36	1:06:23	38:34	2:10:34
12	Jasmine Hämmerle	Austria	24:18	1:05:44	40:41	2:10:43
13	Marie Overbye	Denmark	22:38	1:09:33	39:31	2:11:42
14	Cedrine Soulet	France	22:18	1:08:58	40:41	2:11:58
15	Beatrice Mouthon	France	22:49	1:09:29	40:06	2:12:26
16	Dolorita Gerber	Switzerland	24:21	1:09:04	39:21	2:12:46
17	Francisca Rüssli	Switzerland	23:31	1:06:54	42:36	2:13:02
18	Alison Hollington	Great Britain	23:34	1:08:51	40:51	2:13:15
19	Fiddy Remondini	Italy	23:13	1:08:55	41:16	2:13:26
20	Virginia Berasategi Luna	Spain	22:13	1:09:04	42:19	2:13:38
21	Brigitte Scheithauer	Germany	21:53	1:08:20	43:31	2:13:46
22	Jitske Cats	Netherlands	26:04	1:10:01	38:09	2:14:15
23	Agathe Liniger	Switzerland	23:58	1:08:28	41:53	2:14:20
24	Jacqueline Van Vliet	Netherlands	25:46	1:08:36	40:24	2:14:46
25	Helene Cawtborne	Great Britain	26:38	1:10:12	38:12	2:15:03
26	Judit Bodrogai	Hungary	23:13	1:08:08	44:08	2:15:30
27	Manuela Ianesi	Italy	22:57	1:12:23	40:59	2:16:21
28	Susanne Habiger	Germany	22:41	1:11:19	42:53	2:16:53
29	Renata Berkova	Czech Republic	22:07	1:14:18	40:34	2:17:01
30	Adél Molnár	Hungary	22:39	1:12:29	42:10	2:17:19
31	Marisa Gomez	Spain	22:01	1:13:28	42:02	2:17:31
32	Christine De Wit	Netherlands	24:15	1:10:14	43:13	2:17:42
33	Silvia Ricco	Italy	23:11	1:11:44	42:59	2:17:54
34	Maria Gavrilova	Latvia	24:58	1:11:18	41:41	2:17:57
35	Erika Molnár	Hungary	24:11	1:14:44	39:51	2:18:46
36	Maribel Blanco Velasco	Spain	24:17	1:12:50	41:44	2:18:51
37	Nina Anisimova	Russia	22:10	1:13:34	43:10	2:18:54
38	Astrid Perathoner	Italy	21:58	1:10:17	47:45	2:19:00
39	Fiona Lothian	Great Britain	26:34	1:11:06	41:45	2:19:25
40	Rahel Pfeiffer	Switzerland	24:03	1:12:09	45:05	2:21:17
41	Vera Maros	Hungary	23:12	1:11:58	46:26	2:21:36
42	Olga Kounschikova	Ukraine	24:41	1:15:31	41:36	2:21:48
43	Tatiana Parfenceva	Russia	25:48	1:12:18	43:45	2:21:51
44	Johanna Forsberg	Sweden	22:43	1:11:25	47:59	2:22:07
45	Asa Anderson	Sweden	23:31	1:16:16	42:33	2:22:20
46	Katarina Andersson	Sweden	23:41	1:13:20	45:28	2:22:29
47	Ariane Gutknecht	Switzerland	28:38	1:12:43	41:14	2:22:35
48	Anne Paul	Ireland	30:05	1:12:01	40:53	2:22:59
49	Christel Van Eesbeek	Belgium	25:45	1:08:54	48:49	2:23:28
50	Roswitha Hölzl	Austria	30:44	1:11:17	41:32	2:23:33
51	Ditte Thygesen	Denmark	22:10	1:17:53	43:37	2:23:40
52	Nerea Martinez Urruzola	Spain	24:36	1:13:39	45:41	2:23:56
53	Maria Alikina	Russia	00:00	00:00	47:06	2:25:38
54	Helen Peelo	Ireland	29:03	1:12:41	45:06	2:26:50
55	Linda Mcanee	Ireland	26:04	1:17:48	48:05	2:31:57
56	Gilda Mota	Portugal	28:03	1:22:59	43:59	2:35:01

* transition zone times were not recorded separately for this event.
* Sabine Westhoff is often referred to in historic results as Simone Westhoff, aswas the case for the 1994 championships.
