= Mikhail Kuznetsov =

Mikhail Kuznetsov may refer to:

- Mikhail Kuznetsov (canoeist) (born 1985), Russian slalom canoeist
- Mikhail Kuznetsov (rower) (born 1952), Russian rower
- Mikhail Kuznetsov (pilot) (1913–1989), Soviet ace, double Hero of the Soviet Union
- Mikhail Vladimirovich Kuznetsov (born 1988), figure skater
- Mikhail Kuznetsov (triathlete) (born 1979), triathlete from Kazakhstan
- Mikhail Kuznetsov (actor) (1918–1986), Soviet/Russian actor
- Mikhail Sergeevich Kuznetsov (born 1978), Russian state, public and scientific figure
- Mikhail Varfolomeyevich Kuznetsov, Russian politician, Governor of Pskov Oblast in Russia
