= Rehula =

Rehula or Řehula is a surname. Notable people with the surname include:

- Jan Řehula (born 1973), Czech triathlete
- Juha Rehula (born 1963), Finnish politician
