= Illanes =

Illanes (and Yllanes) is a Spanish-origin surname, appearing in the names of:

- Alejandro Mario Yllanes (1913–1960), Bolivian painter
- Héctor Noguera (b. 1937), full name Héctor Eugenio Noguera Illanes, Chilean actor
- José María Merchán (b. 1976), full name José María Merchán Illanes, Spanish triathlete
- Juan Pedro Yllanes (b. 1960), Spanish politician and former judge
- Julio Alberto Mercado Illanes (1920–1994), Chilean businessman and politician
- Marcos Vales (b. 1975), full name Marcos Vales Illanes, Spanish footballer
- Pablo Illanes (b. 1973), Chilean scriptwriter
- Rodolfo Illanes (1960–2016), Bolivian politician
