= Kiwami =

French sportswear designer and manufacturer

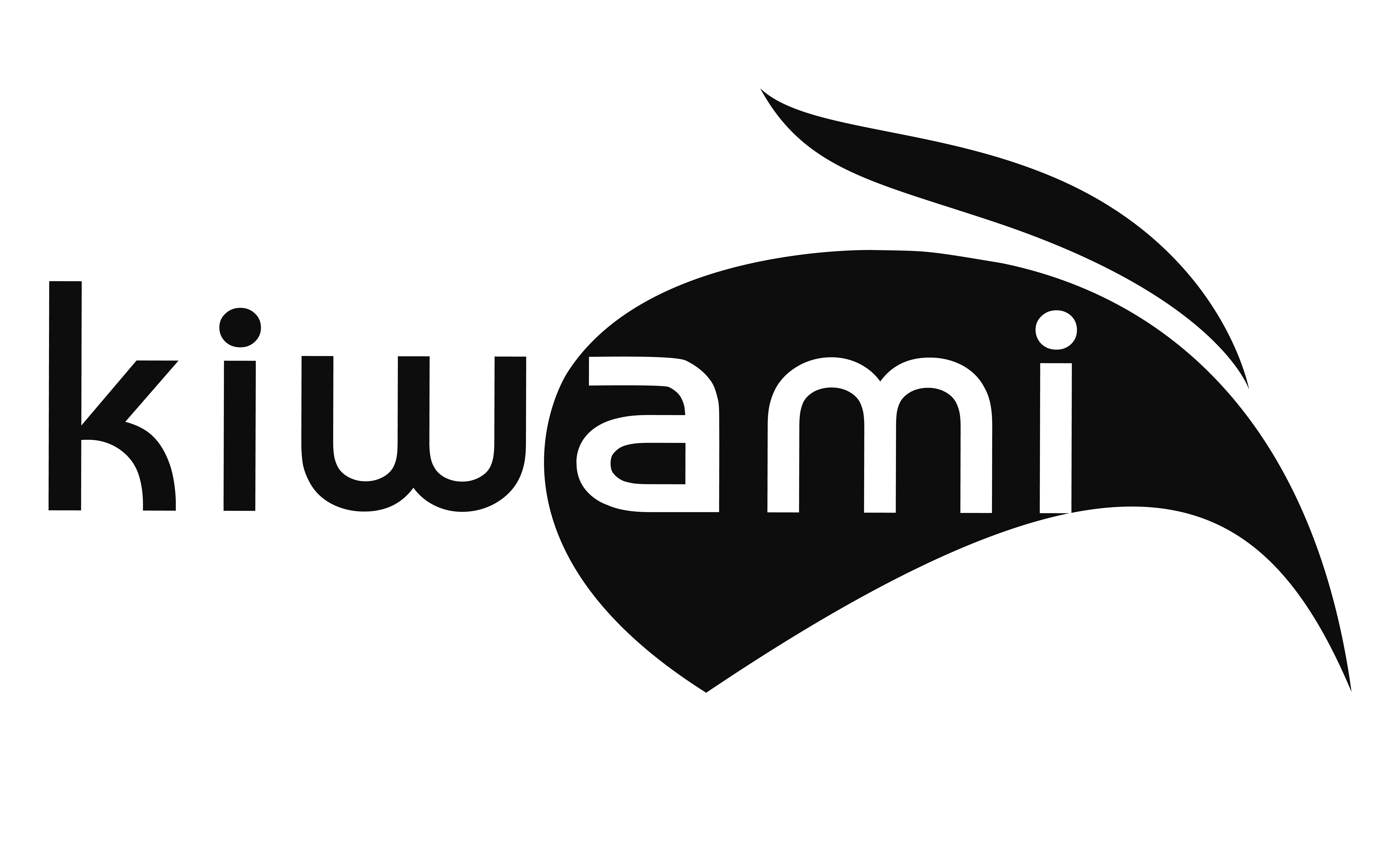
Official Logo

Kiwami (Triathlon) is a French company that designs and manufactures triathlon apparel. The company is headquartered near Pau, France. It was founded in 2003 by two professional triathletes, one from France, Hélène Salomon and one from New Zealand, Craig Watson. The company takes its name from "kiwi", the symbol of New Zealand and "ami" that means "friend" in French. The logo features a kiwi bird wearing a French beret. Kiwami sponsors many high-profile triathletes and triathlon teams around the world, following the motto: "feel the performance". Besides triathlon products, Kiwami also develop other products such as swimwear, triathlon accessories, casual wear and cycling wear.

== History ==
In 2003 pro triathletes Salomon and Craig Watson hung up their wetsuits, TT bikes and race flats to found Kiwami. Craig, who was 3rd at the 2001 ITU World Champs, is a former ITU N°1 ranked athlete and represented New Zealand in a triathlon at the Sydney 2000 Olympic Games, while Hélène is a multiple French champion and was the first Frenchwoman to win an official IRONMAN® event. Both are still active athletes and are always the first people to test Kiwami’s new products. The first product created by Kiwami was the emblematic « Amphibian » trisuit, which is still used by numerous pros and national teams, and has been a constant in the past 3 Olympic triathlon events.

== Awards ==
At ISPO Munich 2014, Kiwami presented a revolutionary trisuit - the Spider WS1. A jury of international sports industry experts carried out detailed assessments and testing of more than 400 products and selected the Kiwami trisuit as winner of the Gold Award for best performance Base Layer Product.

== Athletes ==
Kiwami sponsors a certain number of world-class triathletes and teams around the world. It is the official partner of the Netherlands, the South African and the Argentinian federations. Kiwami helps many professional triathletes by providing the best performing trisuits on the market. Triathletes such as Frédéric Belaubre, Laura Reback, Nicky Samuels, Greg Bennett, Filip Ospaly, Matt Reed, Rachel Klamer, Richard Murray, Richard Varga, Dmitry Polyansky, Alexander Bryukhankov, and Cyril Viennot have worn Kiwami trisuits, from the Olympic Games to the shores of Hawaii.

== See also ==
- Cooperalls
- Sportswear (activewear)
