= Čupr =

Čupr (feminine: Čuprová) is a Czech surname. Notable people with the surname include:

- Martin Čupr (born 1977), Czech footballer
- Michal Čupr (born 1991), Czech fencer
