= Vassilis Krommidas =

Greek triathlete and coach

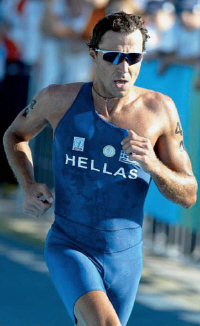
Vassilis Krommidas in Athens 2004 Olympic Games trials

Vassilis Krommidas (Greek: Βασίλης Κρομμύδας, born July 4, 1970, in Thessaloniki) is a triathlete and coach from Greece best known for competing at the 2000 and 2004 Olympic Games.

Krommidas is a graduate of the Aristotle University of Thessaloniki with a degree in Physical Education and Sports Sciences. He started his competitive career as a swimmer at the age of ten and later became a member of the Greek national swimming team. He took up triathlon in 1989. Throughout his career he posted numerous top finishes in various distance races. He was a member of the Greek national triathlon team for several years and has won the Greek Triathlon Championship a record eleven times.

In the early years of his career Krommidas competed mostly in long distances. He took 17th place at the 1994 Ironman World Championship in Hawaii and holds the course record for the Age Group M18-24 (8:55:02) ever since.

Other notable results include 10th place at the 1992 Ironman Europe in Roth (8:27:38), 4th place at the 1993 Ironman Podersdorf Austria (8:35:22) and 8th place at the 1994 Ironman Lanzarote (9:01:20). At the 1997 ITU Long Distance Triathlon World Championships in Nice (4 km / 120 km / 30 km) he took 8th place in 5:49:56.

He gradually shifted his focus to shorter distances. He competed at the first Olympic Triathlon at the 2000 Summer Olympics in Sydney and took 33rd place in 1:51:28. Four years later, at the 2004 Summer Olympics in Athens, he competed again. He completed the swim in 18:20 but was forced to withdraw from the race during the cycling stage due to technical problems with his bike.

Krommidas’ coaching career includes five years as the head coach of the Greek Triathlon Federation from 2005 to 2009. He has coached triathlete Deniz Dimaki, nine-time Greek national champion who participated in the women's triathlon in 2008 Summer Olympics in Beijing and has won a bronze medal at the ETU European Duathlon Championships in the same year. Krommidas also coached national triathletes Kostas Dovanas (four-time Greek male champion) and Zarina Kopina (2011 and 2012 Greek female champion) and he has been the Cyprus Triathlon National Team's coach since January 2011.

Nowadays he coaches various levels of athletes from amateur to professional level. He regularly contributes articles on training and racing for endurance sports magazines.
