= Andriy Glushchenko =

Ukrainian triathlete (born 1977)

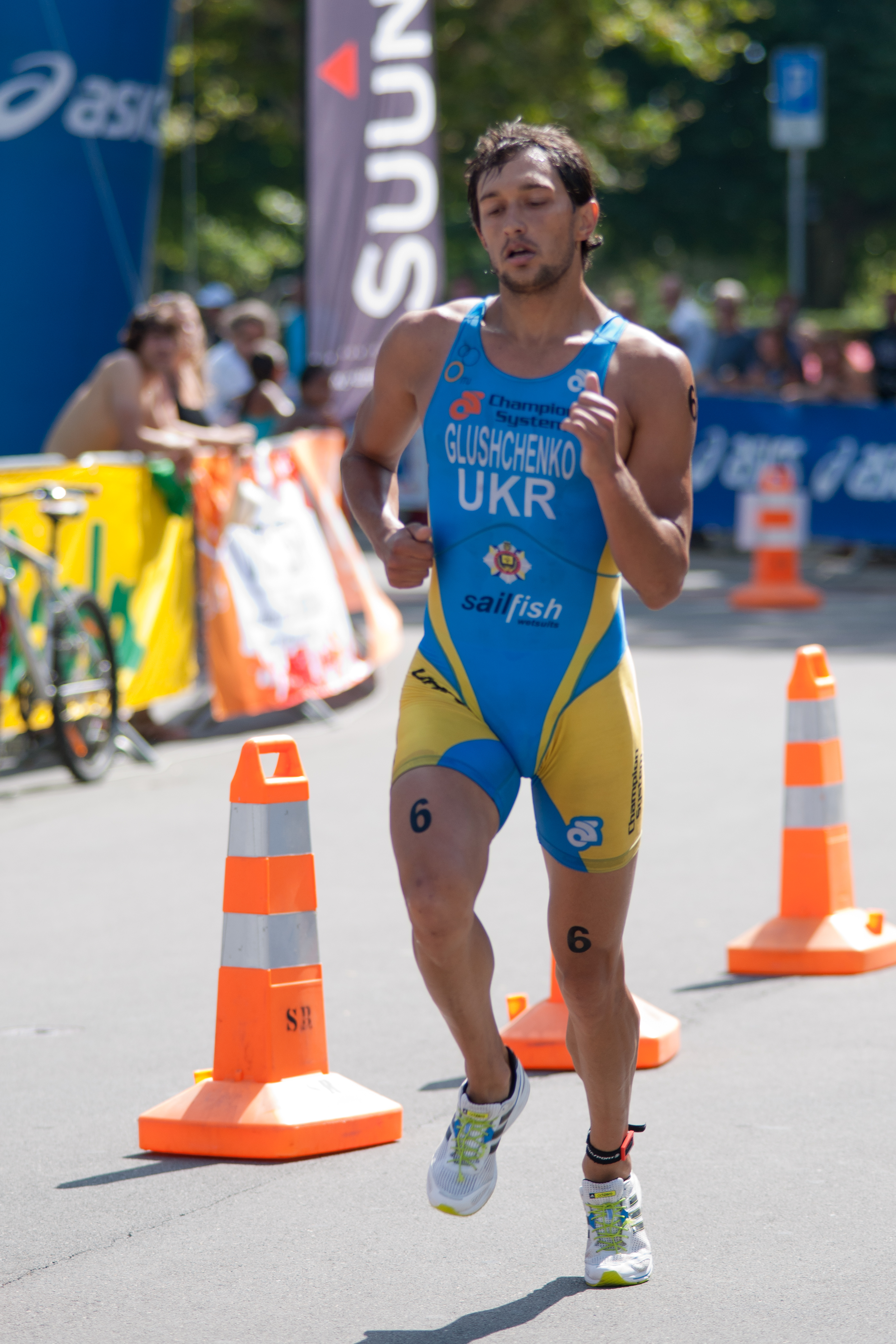
- Andriy Glushchenko during the 2010 ITU Sprint Distance Triathlon World Championships

Personal information
- Born: 23 October 1977 (age 47); Kirovohrad, Ukrainian SSR, Soviet Union
- Height: 6 ft 0 in (1.83 m)
- Weight: 161 lb (73 kg)

Sport
- Country: Ukraine
- Club: TYR, Xterra

Andriy Glushchenko (Ukrainian: Андрій Олександрович Глущенко; born 23 October 1977) is a Ukrainian triathlete.

Glushchenko competed at the first Olympic triathlon at the 2000 Summer Olympics. He took eleventh place with a total time of 1:49:30.17. Four years later, at the 2004 Summer Olympics, Glushchenko competed again but was unable to finish the competition. In 1997, Glushchenko won the Junior Men ITU Triathlon World Championships in Perth.
