= Tracy Looze =

Triathlete

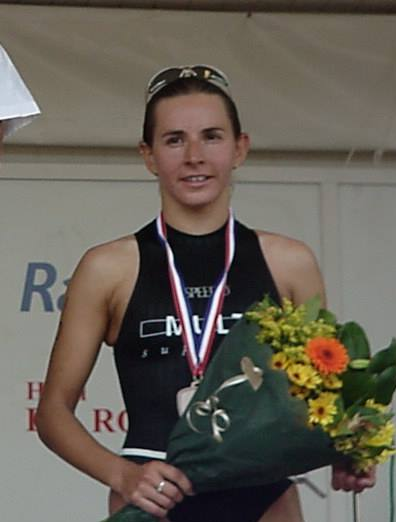

Tracy Looze-Hargreaves (born 16 August 1973 in Bulli, New South Wales) is an athlete from the Netherlands, although she was born in Australia. She competes in triathlon, and got her Dutch passport by marrying Dutch triathlete Dennis Looze.

Looze competed at the second Olympic triathlon at the 2004 Summer Olympics. She took twenty-ninth place with a total time of 2:10:35.81.
