= Radim Kořínek =

Czech cyclist

Radim Kořínek (born 1 December 1973) is a Czech former competitive cyclist. He was born in Olomouc. He took part in two Olympics: the 2000 Olympic Games in Sydney, as well as the 2004 Olympics in Athens.

He was in Olpran racing team and then he went to Česká spořitelna MTB team in which he had most of his achievements. Other hobbies include hockey, tennis, and skiing. His nickname is Rades. His coach was Karel Martínek. After ending his competitive career, he founded his own bike shop and is still around cycling.

== Achievements and titles ==
- 1998: MČR, MTB, cross country, 1st place
- 1999: MM Slovakia, MTB, cross country, 2nd place
- 1999: MS, Are (Šweden), MTB, cross country, 34th place
- 2000: Olympic Games, Sydney (Australia), Cross Country Mountain Bike, 29th place
- 2000: MČR, MTB, relay race, 1st place, with Kateřina Neumann and David Kašek
- 2002: MČR, MTB, bike marathon, 1st place
- 2002: MS, Kaprun (Austria), MTB, cross country, 27th place
- 2003: MČR, Zadov, MTB, cross country, 3rd place
- 2004: Olympic Games, Athens (Greece), Cross Country Mountain Bike, 22nd place
- Many times he was Czech Republic Champion.
