= Megan Evans =

Australian artist

Megan Evans is a Melbourne based visual artist known for her works about Australian colonisation. She graduated from Victoria University of Technology with a PhD in 2003. Evans describes herself as an interdisciplinary artist. Her work is held in a number of collections, including the National Gallery of Australia and the Art Gallery of Ballarat. She won the Footscray Art Prize in 2019 for her work, PARLOUR.
