= Daiki Masuda =

Japanese baseball player (born 1993)

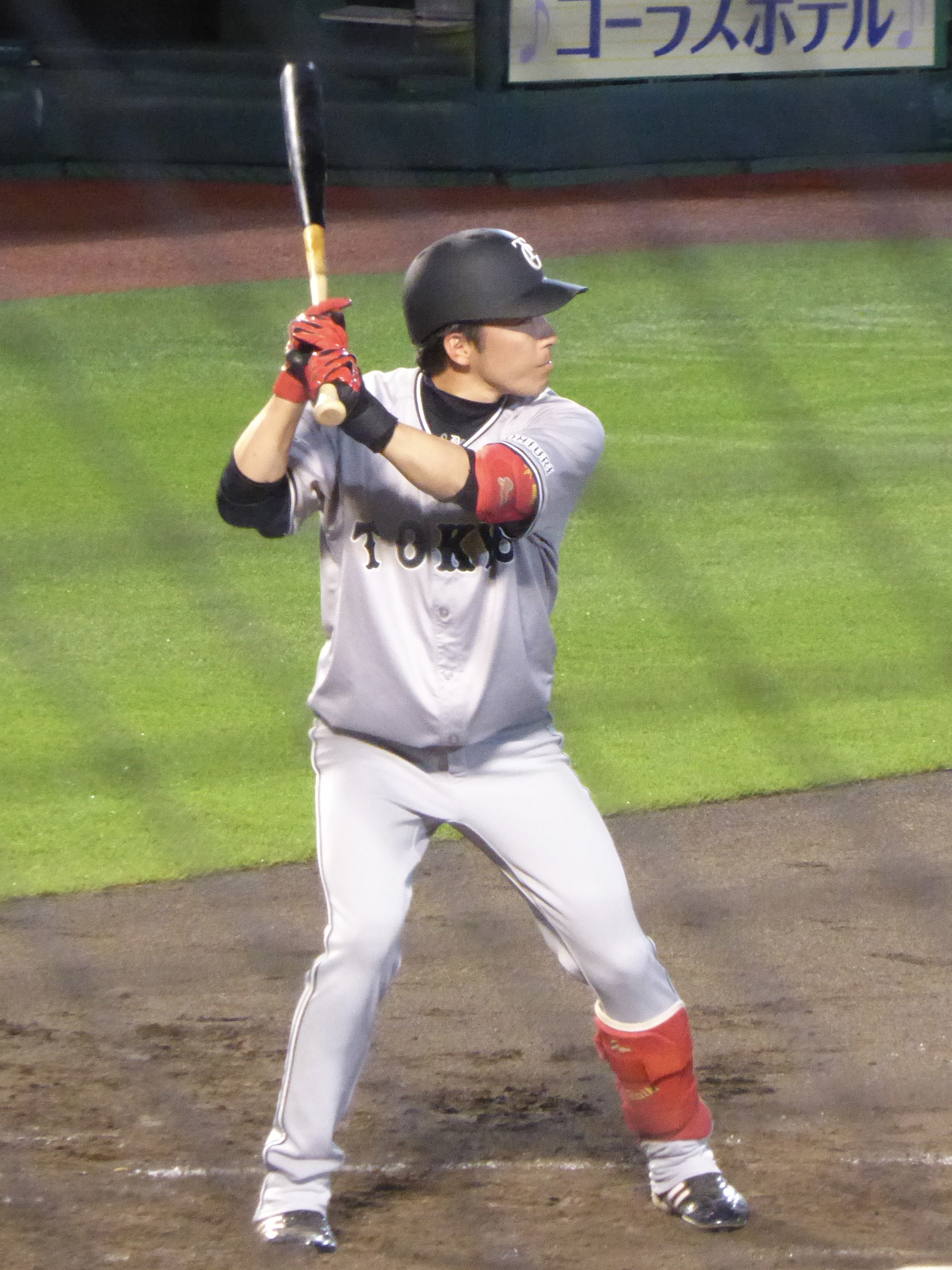
- Masuda with the Yomiuri Giants

Yomiuri Giants – No. 0
- Infielder
- Born: July 29, 1993 (age 32); Tokushima, Tokushima, Japan
- Bats: Right Throws: Right

NPB debut
- April 19, 2019, for the Yomiuri Giants

NPB statistics (through 2025 season)
- Batting average: .204
- Home runs: 1
- RBI: 15
- Hits: 39
- Stolen base: 68
- Sacrifice bunt: 16
- Stats at Baseball Reference

Teams
- Yomiuri Giants (2016–present)

Daiki Masuda (増田 大輝, Masuda Daiki; born July 29, 1993) is a professional Japanese baseball player. He plays infielder for the Yomiuri Giants.
