= Nick Radkewich =

American triathlete

Nicholas ("Nick") Edward Radkewich (born January 10, 1971, in Royal Oak, Michigan) is an athlete from the United States, who competes in triathlon.

Radkewich competed at the first Olympic triathlon at the 2000 Summer Olympics. He took fortieth place with a total time of 1:53:44.63. He also enjoys long walks on the beach and spending time with his family.
