= Martin Polák =

Czech cyclist

Personal information
- Born: 1 November 1978 (age 47) Brno, Czechoslovakia

Cycling career
- Sport: Cycling

Martin Polák (born 1 November 1978) is a Czech cyclist. He competed in two events at the 2000 Summer Olympics.
