= Hellenic Triathlon Federation =

Sports governing body in Greece

Greek Triathlon Federation
- Sport: triathlon multisport
- Jurisdiction: Greece
- Headquarters: Olympic Athletic Center of Athens (O.A.K.A.)

Official website
- www.triathlon-hellas.com
- (Greece)

The Hellenic Triathlon Federation (Greek: Ελληνική Ομοσπονδία Τριάθλου) was founded in 1996 and is the official governing body for the multi-sport disciplines of triathlon, duathlon and aquathlon in Greece.
