= Mikhail Sergeevich Kuznetsov =

Russian figure (born 1978)

- Born: May 10, 1978 (age 47); Gorky, USSR

Mikhail Sergeevich Kuznetsov (Russian: Михаил Сергеевич Кузнецов, 10 May 1978, Gorky, USSR) is a Russian state, public and scientific figure. He served as Deputy head of Nizhny Novgorod, and deputy of the City Duma of Nizhny Novgorod.

== Early life ==
Mikhail Kuznetsov was born on May 10, 1978, in Gorky. In 1995 he graduated from secondary school 1 in Nizhny Novgorod. In 2005 he graduated from the Volga State Academy of Water Transport.

== Career ==
Since 2003, he has engaged in advising medium and large enterprises on the issues of strategy building and personnel management. He implemented more than 50 strategic projects in large Russian companies, leading them to high economic indicators. The group of experts is developing programs to improve performance indicators for large commercial and industrial enterprises.

In 2010, Kuznetsov created the Center for Management and Policy Consulting "Osnova". To date, the Center has conducted more than 50 successful projects in the field of personnel management, motivation, strategy, bonus system at leading manufacturing, commercial, industrial and budget enterprises and organizations.

In September 2015 he was elected to the city Duma of Nizhny Novgorod, he is chairman of the permanent commission of ecology, is a member of the permanent commission of the city Duma on local self-government.

Throughout 2016, the Commission on the Environment of the City Duma of Nizhny Novgorod, chaired by Kuznetsov, worked with the Department of Culture of the Nizhny Novgorod City Administration to develop a park zone program. The program was approved by the City Duma and became the first in the Russian Federation.

He is the author of the term Lidocracy.

== Philanthropy ==
In 2006, Kuznetsov became a member of the Board of Trustees of the Nizhny Novgorod Charitable Foundation. He was CEO until 2017.

Projects:

- "Save a little life." More than 170 children with serious diseases were treated.
- "The Boat of Childhood". 90 pupils of different directions from holidays and master classes to psychological training are organized for pupils of three orphanages.
- "Beautiful city". On the initiative of the BF NO "Nizhegorodsky" since 2007 in Nizhny Novgorod, a citywide project "Beautiful City" is conducted annually, within the framework of which 10 separate zones are landscaped by organizing a competition among residents.

== Social activity ==
In 2014 he became a member of the All-Russian People's Front, a member of the regional headquarters.

Under Kuznetsov's chairmanship in 2015-2016 the group "Ecology and Forest" held more than 15 roundtables and discussion platforms with the involvement of experts on environmental issues. Kuznetsov: The Nizhny Novgorod region needs a program for the development of parks and squares.

In 2014, the Public Monitoring Group initiated the protection of Koposovska Dubrava (a natural monument in the Sormovo district). At the initiative of the ONF, public hearings were held on the creation of a "green shield" in Nizhny Novgorod. ONF activists discussed the problems of harvesting and storing snow in Nizhny Novgorod, ONF in the Nizhny Novgorod region proposed a solution to the problem of non-working stormwaters. He directed several visiting sessions to curb the activities of unauthorized landfills and monitored the work of all officially operating landfills and waste sorting complexes in the Nizhny Novgorod region.

== Personal life ==
He is married and has a son.
