= Anikó Góg =

Hungarian triathlete

Anikó Góg (born 10 February 1980 in Orosháza, Békés) is an athlete from Hungary. She competes in triathlon. Góg competed at the first Olympic triathlon at the 2000 Summer Olympics. She took thirty-ninth place with a total time of 2:14:50.55.
