= Mark Marabini =

Zimbabwean triathlete (1964–2020)

Mark Marabini (7 November 1964 in Harare – 16 March 2020) is an athlete from Zimbabwe. He competes in triathlon. He studied at Oriel Boys' High School in Chisipite in Harare.

Marabini competed at the first Olympic triathlon at the 2000 Summer Olympics. He did not finish the competition.
