= Ralf Eggert =

German triathlete and duathlete (born 1971)

Personal information
- Nickname: Eggi
- Nationality: German
- Born: 25 December 1971 (age 54) Hamburg, West Germany

Sport
- Sport: Triathlon, Duathlon
- Club: Vitalia-Triathlon Team
- Retired: 2012
Medal record
Men's triathlon
Representing Germany
ITU World Championships
Bronze medal – third place	1994 Wellington	Olympic distance
Bronze medal – third place	1995 Cancún	Olympic distance
ETU European Championships
Silver medal – second place	1994 Eichstätt	Olympic distance
Bronze medal – third place	1996 Szombathely	Olympic distance
FISU World University Championships
Gold medal – first place	1998 Kiel	Olympic distance
Men's duathlon
ETU European Championships
Silver medal – second place	1993 Königslutter	Individual

Ralf Eggert (born 25 December 1971) is a retired German triathlete and duathlete who achieved multiple international podium finishes in the 1990s, including bronze medals at the 1994 and 1995 ITU Triathlon World Championships, further European Championship medals, and national titles.

== Early life and career ==
Born in Hamburg and raised in Schleswig-Holstein, Eggert began competing in triathlons in 1987 and joined the German national squad in 1990 while representing the Vitalia-Triathlon Team. He entered the Bundeswehr sports promotion group in 1992 and went on to study business administration and sports economics at the Universities of Hamburg and Kiel.

Eggert established himself at the senior level in 1993 by winning his first German short-distance triathlon title and taking the silver medal at the ETU Duathlon European Championships in Königslutter. He successfully defended his national crown in both 1994 and 1995, while also emerging as a regular contender on the international circuit.

During the 1994 season, he earned silver behind Simon Lessing at the ETU European Championships in Eichstätt and claimed a bronze at the ITU Triathlon World Championships in Wellington in the same year.

The following year, Eggert won his first global level race, the ITU Triathlon World Cup event in Hamilton, Bermuda. He secured a second consecutive World Championship bronze medal in Cancún later that year. In 1996, he took a second European Championship bronze in Szombathely.

He won his first international championshp gold at the FISU World University Triathlon Championship in Kiel in 1998.

In the early 2000s, Eggert shifted his focus to long-distance triathlon competition. He placed fourth at Ironman Europe in 2001, finished fifth at the 2002 ITU Long Distance Triathlon World Championships in Nice, and completed the Ironman World Championship in Kona several times.

Retiring from elite racing in 2012, he returned to age-group competition and won silver in the Sprint race for the 50–54 division at the 2023 World Triathlon Championship Series Grand Final in Hamburg.

== Personal life ==
Eggert married fellow triathlete Nina Fischer in 2004. He worked with the German Triathlon Union on youth development before relocating to Switzerland to work in sports marketing for DT Swiss.

== Major results ==
1991
ITU World Championships

6th, men's junior

1993
ETU Duathlon European Championships

(silver) men's elite

National Short-Distance Championships

(gold) men's elite

1994
ETU European Championships

(silver) men's elite

ITU World Championships

(bronze) men's elite

National Short-Distance Championships

(gold) men's elite

1995
ITU World Championships

(bronze) men's elite

ITU Triathlon World Cup, Hamilton

(gold) men's elite

National Short-Distance Championships

(gold) men's elite

1996
ETU European Championships

(bronze) men's elite

1998
FISU World University Championships

(gold) men's elite

2001
Ironman Europe

4th, men's elite

2002
ITU Long Distance World Championships

5th, men's elite

2003
Ironman Germany

8th, men's elite
