= Nicole Hackett =

Australian triathlete

Medal record

Women's Triathlon

Representing Australia

Commonwealth Games
Bronze medal – third place	2002 Manchester	Women's race

ITU World Championships
Gold medal – first place	2000 Perth	Elite women's race

Nicole Hackett (born 10 December 1978 in Sydney) is an athlete from Australia, who competes in triathlon. She won the bronze medal at the 2002 Commonwealth Games however her greatest achievement is her son James born 4 June 2006

Hackett completed at the first Olympic triathlon at the 2000 Summer Olympics. She took ninth place with a total time of 2:03:10.81. Her split times were 19:41.08 for the swim, 1:05:37.10 for the cycling, and 0:37:52.63 for the run.
