= José María Merchán =

Spanish triathlete

Personal information
- Full name: José María Merchán Illanes
- Born: 7 July 1976 (age 49) Seville, Spain

Sport
- Country: Spain
- Sport: Triathlon

José María Merchán Illanes (Note: In this Spanish name, the first or paternal surname is Merchán and the second or maternal family name is Illanes.) (born 7 July 1976 in Seville) is a Spanish triathlete.

Merchan competed in the first Olympic triathlon at the 2000 Summer Olympics Sydney 2000. He did not finish the competition because of a fall in the bicycle sector.
