= Anneliese Heard =

Welsh triathlete

Personal information
- Full name: Anneliese Heard
- Born: 3 November 1981 (age 44) Newport, Wales, United Kingdom
- Height: 164 cm (5 ft 5 in)
- Weight: 55 kg (121 lb)

Cycling career
- Sport: Cycling
- Discipline: Road
- Role: Rider

Professional team
- 2007: Univega Raleigh Lifeforce

Anneliese Heard (born 3 November 1981) is a Welsh triathlete from Bassaleg near Newport, Wales.

At the age of eight, she competed in her first triathlon, winning the Cannock Chase in under nine category. Crowned British Juvenile Champion at the age of 12, she went on to become World Junior Champion in 1999 and 2000. In 2002, she debuted in the Commonwealth Games in Manchester, where she finished ninth. She was also present at the launch a set of stamps by the Royal Mail, featuring swimming, cycling and track, prior to the Games. Her performances were affected by injury in 2004 and 2005.

Anneliese was again a member of the Welsh triathlon team at the 2006 Commonwealth Games in Melbourne, Australia, this time she finished eleventh. She turned to professional cycling in 2007, riding for the same team as Nicole Cooke, the Swiss Univega Raleigh Lifeforce Pro Cycling Team.

Heard is one of many athletes working with Super Schools to inspire children to take up sport. A qualified coach, she is worked for Welsh Cycling as a coach coordinator then talent development coach. Anneliese then started working for England Athletics in 2012, as Club and Coach Support Officer.
