= Johannes Enzenhofer =

Austrian triathlete

Johannes Enzenhofer (born 4 October 1965) is an athlete from Austria. He competes in triathlon.

Enzenhofer competed at the first Olympic triathlon at the 2000 Summer Olympics. He took 29th place with a total time of 1:51:02.48.
