= Martin Čupr =

Czech footballer (born 1977)

Personal information
- Date of birth: 17 October 1977 (age 49)
- Place of birth: Liberec, Czechoslovakia
- Height: 1.78 m (5 ft 10 in)
- Position: Midfielder

Senior career*
Years	Team	Apps	(Gls)
1994–2000	Slovan Liberec	109	(6)
2000	Viktoria Žižkov	13	(0)
2000–2002	Fortuna Düsseldorf	41	(2)
2002–2005	Mladá Boleslav	64	(3)
2005–2006	Marila Příbram	39	(3)
2006–2007	AEP Paphos	24	(0)
2007	Sigma Olomouc	1	(0)
2007–2008	Hradec Králové	11	(1)
2008–2010	Sokolov	28	(1)
2010–2011	Sezimovo Ústí	14	(1)
Total		344	(17)

International career
1993–1994	Czech Republic U16	11	(2)
1994	Czech Republic U18	1	(0)
1997	Czech Republic U20	3	(0)
1996–2000	Czech Republic U21	14	(0)
- * Club domestic league appearances and goals

Martin Čupr (born 17 October 1977) is a Czech former professional footballer who has played as a midfielder for clubs in Czech Republic, Germany and Cyprus.

== Club career ==
Čupr began playing professional football in the Czech Gambrinus liga for FC Slovan Liberec, moving to FK Viktoria Žižkov in 2000. He moved to German Regionalliga side Fortuna Düsseldorf for two seasons, returning to play for Gambrinus liga sides FK Mladá Boleslav, FK Marila Příbram and SK Sigma Olomouc.

== International career ==
Čupr was an unused substitute for the Czech Republic at the 2000 Summer Olympics in Sydney, Australia.
