= Stéphan Bignet =

French triathlete (born 1971)

Stéphan Bignet (born 29 June 1971) is an athlete from France. He competes in triathlon.

Bignet competed at the first Olympic triathlon at the 2000 Summer Olympics. He took thirty-first place with a total time of 1:51:12.15.
