= Hideo Fukui =

Japanese triathlete (born 1977)

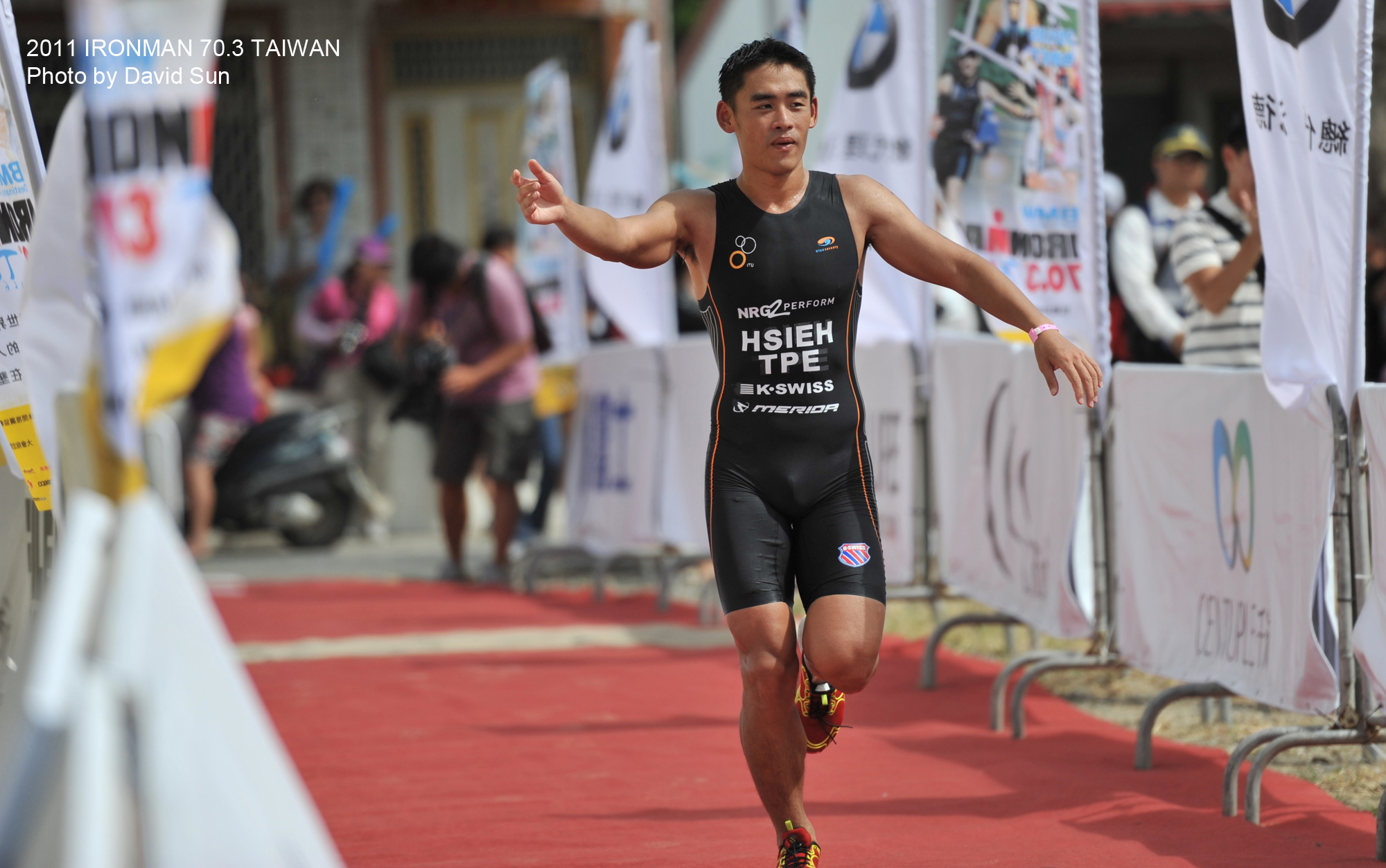
Hideo Fukui

Hideo Fukui (福井 英郎, Fukui Hideo; born September 25, 1977) is an athlete from Japan. He competes in triathlon.

Fukui competed at the first Olympic triathlon at the 2000 Summer Olympics. He took thirty-sixth place with a total time of 1:52:04.79.
