= Volodymyr Polikarpenko =

Ukrainian triathlete (born 1972)

Volodymyr Polikarpenko (born June 9, 1972) is a Ukrainian retired athlete. Born in Zaporizhzhia, he competed in triathlon.

Polikarpenko competed at the first Olympic triathlon at the 2000 Summer Olympics. He took fifteenth place with a total time of 1:49:51.78. In the second Olympic triathlon at the 2004 Summer Olympics, he placed thirtieth with a total time of 1:57:39.28. For the 2008 Summer Olympic games, Polikarpenko placed 35th with a final time of 1:52:51.74. He was fifth at the 2006 Lausanne world championships. Living in Turin, Italy for ten years, he won The Bardolino classic race in Italy for six years in a row, from 2001 to 2006.
