= Magali Messmer =

Swiss triathlete (born 1971)

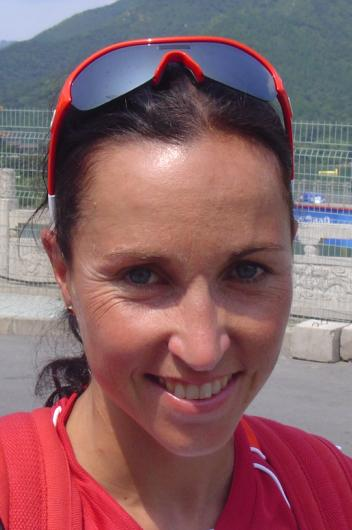
- di Marco at the 2008 Summer Olympics

Personal information
- Born: 9 September 1971 (age 54) La Chaux-de-Fonds, Switzerland
Medal record
Women's triathlon
Representing Switzerland
Olympic games
Bronze medal – third place	2000 Sydney	Individual

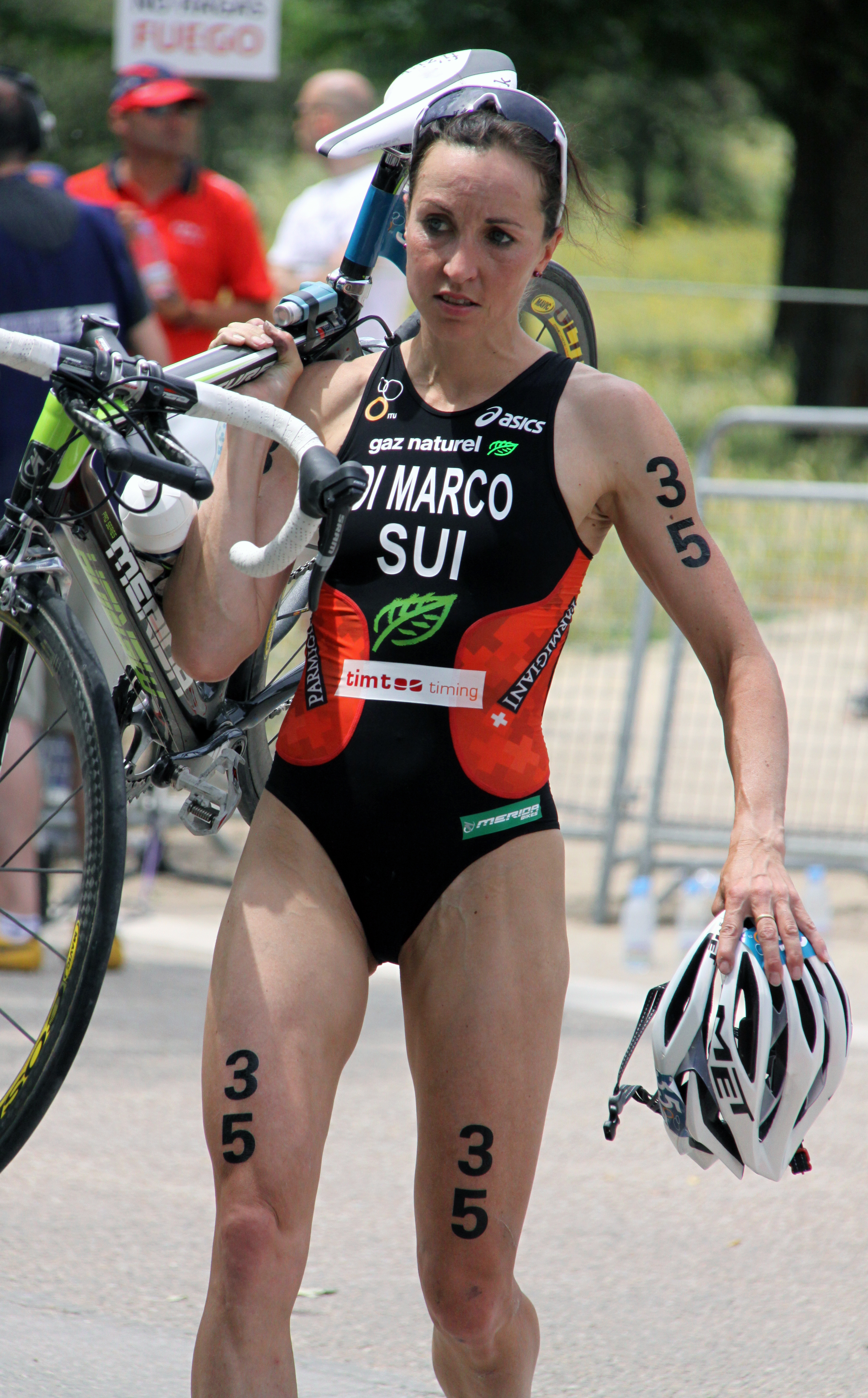
Magali Di Marco Messmer after having been involved in a mass bike crash at the World Championship Series triathlon in Madrid.

Magali Di Marco Messmer (born 9 September 1971 in La Chaux-de-Fonds, Switzerland), is one of the most seasoned professional elite triathletes and part of the Swiss National Team since 1995. She took part in two Olympic Games, placing 3rd in Sydney (2000) and 13th in Beijing (2008). She lives in Troistorrents in Valais.

Magali Di Marco Messmer started her triathlon career in 1995 when she had already retired from swimming, and she won the Swiss Championships in the very first year of her new triathlon career. In 2000, she crowned her efforts by winning the bronze medal at the Olympics in Sydney, whereupon she retired temporarily from triathlon. Living in Monthey together with her husband and working as a manager in an insurance company, she dedicated herself to family life and gave birth to her son Eliah on 2 November 2001. At the end of the year 2004, however, Magali Di Marco hd her comeback to triathlon and in 2005 she achieved several World Cup top ten positions. At the Olympics in Beijing in 2008 she placed 13th and in the World Championship Rankings of the year 2009 she was the number 8 among 106 female elite triathletes, so for more than 15 years Magali Di Marco Messmer has now been a match for the best elite triathletes of the world.

In the 15 years from 1995 to 2009 Magali Di Marco Messmer took part in 73 ITU competitions and achieved 43 top ten positions. In France, Magali Di Marco represents the Triathlon Club Châteauroux in the prestigious Club Championship Series Lyonnaise des Eaux. At the first triathlon of this French circuit in Dunkirk (23 May 2010) she placed 5th and was the best triathlete of her club, at the second triathlon in Beauvais (13 June 2010) she placed 6th and was again among the three athlètes classants l'equipe, and in Paris (18 July 2010) she also achieved an overall top ten position placing ninth and being again the best of the female Châteuroux triathletes.

== ITU and ETU Competitions from 1995 to 2010 ==
All the following competitions are triathlons and belong to the Elite category. The list is based upon the official ITU Profile Page.

Date	Competition	Place	Rank
1995-07-30	European Championships	Stockholm	17
1995-11-12	World Championships	Cancun	26
1996-06-10	World Cup	Paris	8
1996-07-07	European Championships	Szombathely	10
1996-08-24	World Championships	Cleveland	11
1997-04-13	World Cup	Ishigaki	9
1997-06-29	World Cup	Monte Carlo (Monaco)	7
1997-07-05	European Championships	Vuokatti	4
1997-07-26	World Cup	Stockholm	8
1997-08-15	World Cup	Embrun	2
1997-10-26	World Cup	Sydney	17
1997-11-16	World Championships	Perth	10
1998-06-21	World Cup	Zurich	2
1998-08-30	World Championships	Lausanne	40
1998-11-01	World Cup	Auckland	5
1998-11-08	World Cup	Noosa	9
1999-04-11	World Cup	Ishigaki	12
1999-04-18	World Cup	Gamagori	8
1999-06-13	World Cup	Kapelle op den Bos	8
1999-06-20	World Cup	Monte Carlo (Monaco)	1
1999-07-03	European Championships	Funchal	2
1999-08-29	World Cup	Lausanne	4
1999-09-12	World Championships	Montreal	18
2000-03-26	World Cup	Rio de Janeiro	5
2000-04-16	World Cup	Sydney	3
2000-04-30	World Championships	Perth	12
2000-07-08	European Championships	Stein	2
2000-08-12	World Cup	Lausanne	7
2000-09-16	Olympic Games	Sydney	3
2004-10-31	World Cup	Cancun	11
2004-11-07	World Cup	Rio de Janeiro	5
2005-04-24	World Cup	Mazatlan	4
2005-06-05	World Cup	Madrid	6
2005-07-31	World Cup	Salford	8
2005-08-06	World Cup	Hamburg	15
2005-08-20	European Championships	Lausanne	13
2005-09-10	World Championships	Gamagori	21
2005-09-17	OSIM World Cup	Beijing	DNF
2006-04-16	World Cup	Ishigaki	11
2006-05-21	Premium European Cup	Sanremo	1
2006-06-04	BG World Cup	Madrid	20
2006-06-23	European Championships	Autun	16
2006-07-23	BG World Cup	Corner Brook	10
2006-07-30	World Cup	Salford	6
2006-08-20	European Cup	Geneva	2
2006-09-02	World Championships	Lausanne	11
2006-09-24	BG World Cup	Beijing	14
2006-11-05	BG World Cup	Cancun	37
2007-04-15	BG World Cup	Ishigaki	13
2007-05-06	BG World Cup	Lisbon	6
2007-05-13	BG World Cup	Richards Bay	2
2007-06-17	BG World Cup	Des Moines	DNF
2007-06-24	BG World Cup	Edmonton	4
2007-07-22	BG World Cup	Kitzbühel	14
2007-08-19	European Cup	Geneva	1
2007-08-30	BG World Championships	Hamburg	7
2007-09-15	BG World Cup	Beijing	21
2008-05-04	BG World Cup	Richards Bay	3
2008-05-10	European Championships	Lisbon	15
2008-07-05	BG World Cup	Hamburg	7
2008-07-20	BG World Cup	Kitzbühel	7
2008-08-18	Olympic Games	Beijing	13
2008-09-27	BG World Cup	Lorient	7
2009-05-02	Dextro Energy World Championship Series	Tongyeong	7
2009-05-31	Dextro Energy World Championship Series	Madrid	6
2009-06-21	Dextro Energy World Championship Series	Washington DC	19
2009-06-27	Elite Cup	Hy-Vee	4
2009-07-11	Dextro Energy World Championship Series	Kitzbühel	13
2009-07-25	Dextro Energy World Championship Series	Hamburg	13
2009-08-15	Dextro Energy World Championship Series	London	13
2009-09-09	Dextro Energy World Championship Series, Grand Final	Gold Coast	7
2010-06-05	Dextro Energy World Championship Series	Madrid	DNF
2010-07-03	European Championships	Athlone	6

BG = the sponsor British Gas · DNF = did not finish · DNS = did not start
