= Roland Melis =

Personal information
- Born: November 13, 1974 (age 50)

Sport
- Sport: Triathlon

Roland Melis (born November 13, 1974) is an athlete from the Netherlands Antilles, who competed in the triathlon.

Melis competed at the first Olympic triathlon at the 2000 Summer Olympics. He took forty-fifth place with a total time of 1:56:11.95.
