= Nina Anisimova (triathlete) =

Russian triathlete

Nina Valentinovna Anisimova (Russian: Нина Валентиновна Анисимова) (born February 26, 1973) is a Russian triathlete. She was born in Saint Petersburg.

Anisimova competed in the first Olympic triathlon at the 2000 Summer Olympics. She took twelfth place with a total time of 2:03:26.35. At the 2004 Summer Olympics, she did not finish the competition.
