= Craig Watson (triathlete) =

New Zealand triathlete

Medal record

Representing New Zealand

Men's triathlon

ITU Triathlon World Championships
Bronze medal – third place	2001 Edmonton	Elite men's race

Craig Robert Watson (born 2 June 1971 in Invercargill) is an athlete from the New Zealand, who competed in triathlon.

Watson competed at the first Olympic triathlon at the 2000 Summer Olympics. He took sixteenth place with a total time of 1:50:01.16. In 2001 he placed 3rd at the World Championships at Edmonton, Canada. He also won the ITU World Cup race in Rennes, France and for a time was ranked number one in the world.

Watson retired from the sport after narrowly failing to win an automatic spot on the New Zealand Olympic team for Athens 2004, after finishing 6th at the 2003 World Championships in Queenstown, New Zealand.

Watson lived and raced in Europe, based in France for many years and now lives in Pau with his French wife Héléne Salomon herself a successful triathlete. Together they have two daughters Juliet and Leilani and run a triathlon race wear business called Kiwami.
