= Mikhail Kuznetsov (triathlete) =

Kazakhstani triathlete

Mikhail Aleskandrovich Kuznetsov (Russian: Михаил Александрович Кузнецов; born 24 August 1979 in Shymkent, Ongutsik Qazaqstan) is a male triathlete from Kazakhstan.

Kuznetsov competed at the first Olympic triathlon at the 2000 Summer Olympics. He took forty-seventh place with a total time of 1:59:13.50.
