= Alessandro Bottoni =

Italian triathlete (born 1972)

Alessandro Bottoni (born October 13, 1972) is a triathlete from Italy.

Bottoni competed at the first Olympic triathlon at the 2000 Summer Olympics. He took thirty-second place with a total time of 1:51:18.13.
