= Renata Berková =

Czech triathlete

Renata Berková (born May 24, 1975 in Kroměříž) is a triathlete from the Czech Republic.

Berková competed at the first Olympic triathlon at the 2000 Summer Olympics. She took twenty-ninth place with a total time of 2:08:08.37.

Four years later, Berková competed at the 2004 Summer Olympics. Her time in that competition was 2:11:50.94, placing her thirty-second.
