= Stephan Vuckovic =

German triathlete (born 1972)

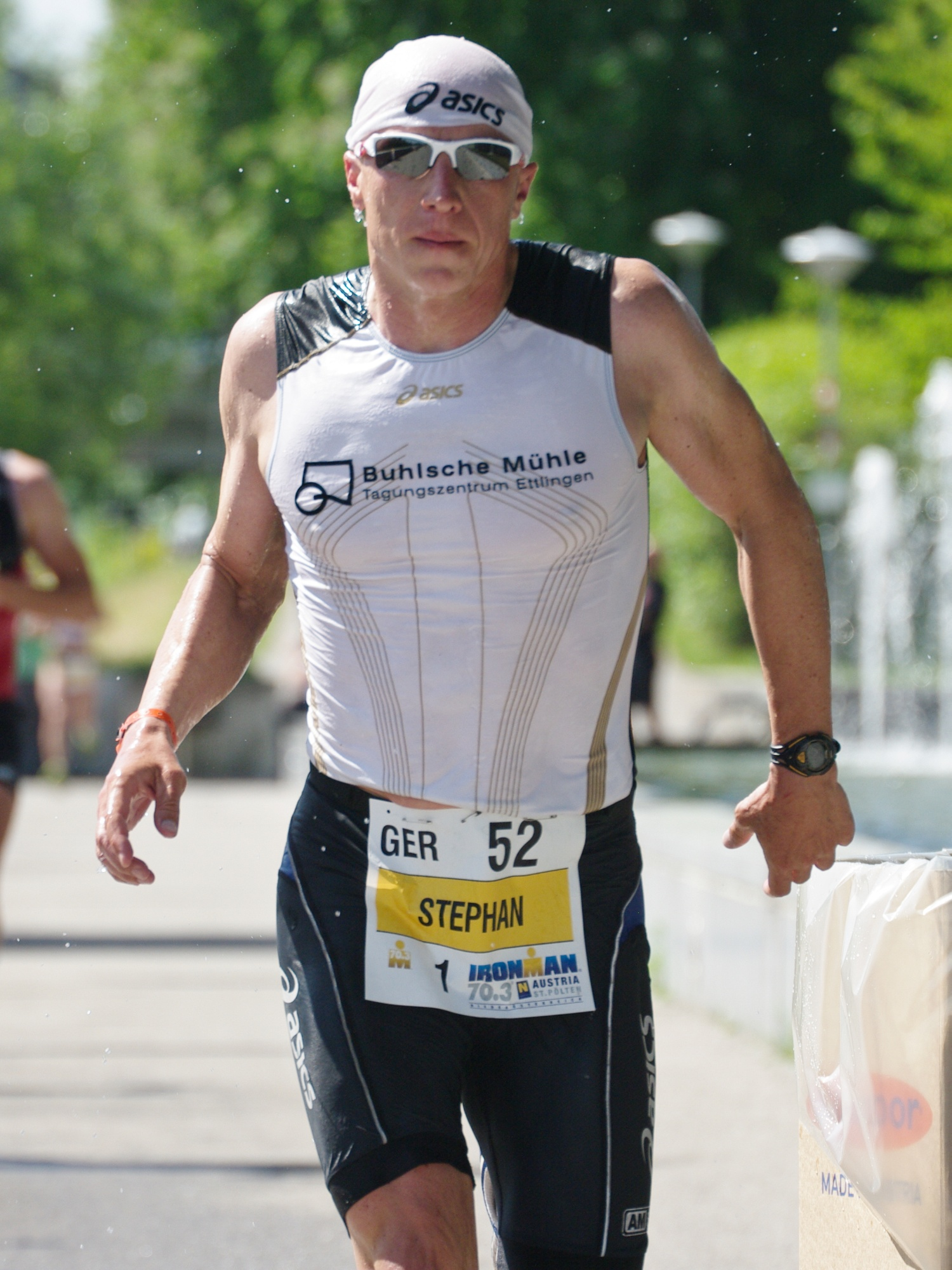

Medal record

Men's Triathlon
Silver medal – second place	2000 Sydney	Triathlon

Stephan Vuckovic (born 22 June 1972 in Reutlingen) is an athlete from Germany, who competes in triathlon.

Vuckovic competed at the first Olympic triathlon at the 2000 Summer Olympics. He won the silver medal with a total time of 1:48:37.58. His split times were 18:35.59 for the swim, 0:58:52.10 for the cycling, and 0:31:09.89 for the run.

Vuckovic began competing in International Triathlon Union races before competing in World Triathlon Corporation races. Beginning in 2005 he competed in several long distance triathlons, finishing on podium of the Ironman Canada 2005 (2nd place) and the Ironman Lanzarote (3rd) in 2007. His results at the World Championship race in Hawaii included a tenth place in 2005, earning him the title of 'best rookie' that year. The following year, he finished with a 14th place at the 2006 championship event.
