= Dennis Looze =

Dutch triathlete

Dennis Looze (born 30 July 1972 in Zaandam) is an athlete from the Netherlands, who competes in triathlon. He is married to Tracy Looze.

Looze competed at the first Olympic triathlon at the 2000 Summer Olympics. He took forty-eighth place with a total time of 2:00:23.80. He was the last to finish, though still ranked higher than the four competitors who did not complete the course.
