= Filip Ospalý =

Czech triathlete

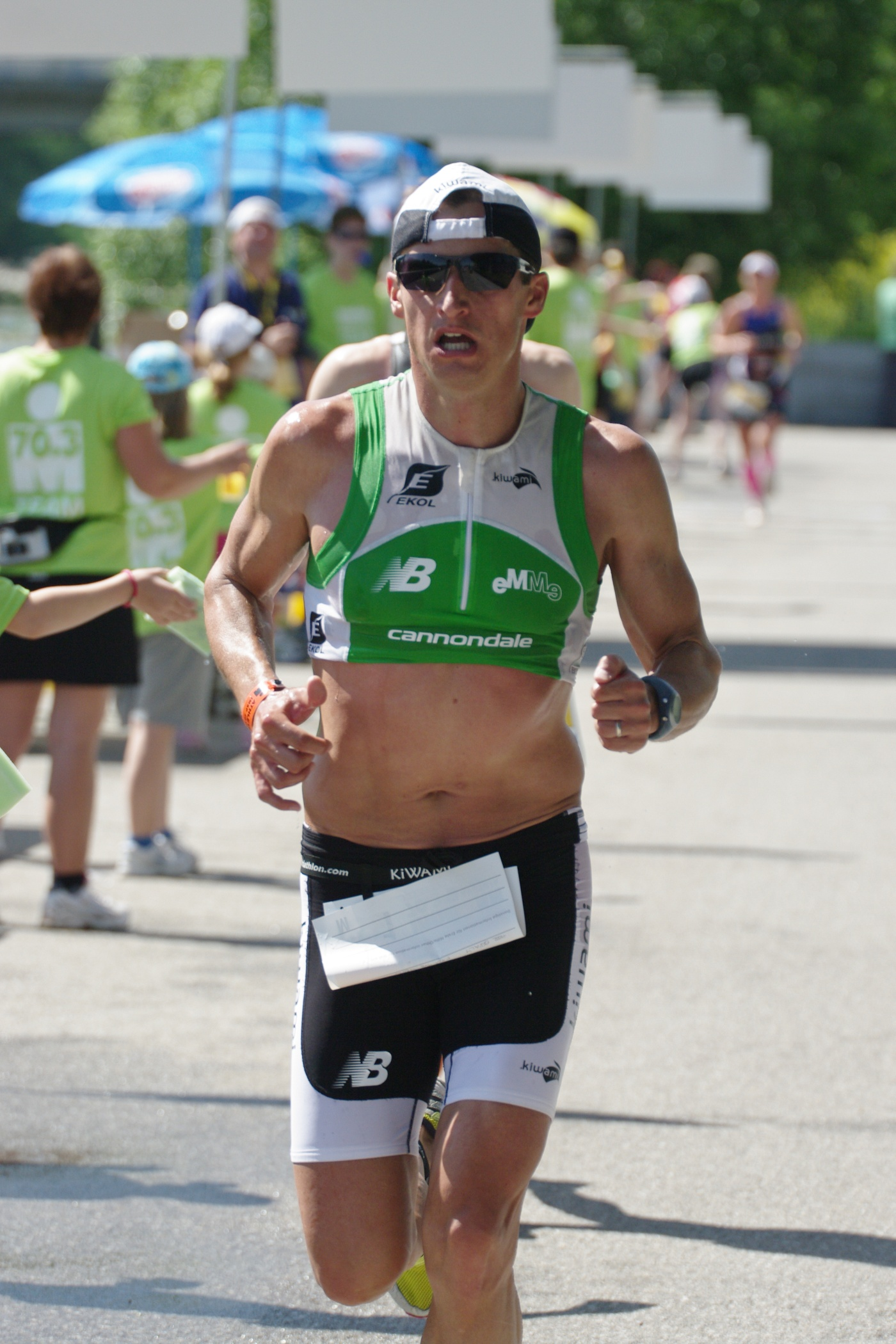

Medal record

Men's Triathlon

Representing Czech Republic

Duathlon European Championships
Gold medal – first place	2006 Rimini	Duathlon

Filip Ospalý (born 15 May 1976 in Ústí nad Labem) is a triathlete from the Czech Republic.

Ospalý competed at the first Olympic triathlon at the 2000 Summer Olympics. He did not finish the competition.

He competed again four years later, at the 2004 Summer Olympics. This time, Ospalý finished. His time of 1:57:17.58 placed him twenty-ninth.

Ospalý became European Champion during the 2006 ITU Duathlon European Championship in Rimini.

He is part of ECS Triathlon club.
