= Jan Řehula =

Czech triathlete

Olympic medal record

Men's Triathlon
Bronze medal – third place	2000 Sydney	Individual

Jan Řehula (Czech pronunciation: [ˈjan ˈr̝ɛɦula]) (born 15 November 1973) is a triathlete from the Czech Republic.

Řehula participated in the first Olympic triathlon at the 2000 Summer Olympics. He won the bronze medal with a total time of 1:48:46.64. His split times were 18:11.89 for the swim, 0:59:13.50 for the cycling, and 0:31:21.25 for the run.

His recent International Triathlon Union rankings include:

- 2002 - 146th
- 2003 - 93rd
