= Triathlon at the 2000 Summer Olympics =

Triathlon at the Games of the XXVII Olympiad
- Venue: Sydney Opera House
- Dates: 16 and 17 September 2000
- Competitors: 100 from 34 nations

Triathlon made its official debut at the 2000 Summer Olympics in Sydney, Australia. This sporting event was held at the Sydney Opera House. Forty-eight triathletes contested the female event on September 16, while fifty-two contested the male event on September 17, making up a total of 100 competitors. Each competitor starts the event with a 1500-metre swim course, followed by a 40 kilometre road bicycle race and finish with a 10 kilometre road run. Each consecutive event in triathlon runs in sequence, without any respite, so that the athlete who crossed the line in first place at the end of the run would be the winner.

== Medalists ==
Five nations won medals in the two inaugural triathlon events. Switzerland was the only nation to earn more than one, winning a gold and a bronze in the women's competition.

Event	Gold	Silver	Bronze
Men's individual	Simon Whitfield; Canada	Stephan Vuckovic; Germany	Jan Řehula; Czech Republic
Women's individual	Brigitte McMahon; Switzerland	Michellie Jones; Australia	Magali Messmer; Switzerland

== Schedule ==
All times are Australian Time (UTC+10)

Event	Date	Start time
Women's Triathlon	September 16	10:00
Men's Triathlon	September 17	10:00

== Medal table ==
Rank	Nation	Gold	Silver	Bronze	Total
1	Switzerland	1	0	1	2
2	Canada	1	0	0	1
3	Australia	0	1	0	1
3	Germany	0	1	0	1
5	Czech Republic	0	0	1	1
Totals (5 entries)		2	2	2	6
