= List of triathletes =

This is a list of triathletes who are athletes notable for their achievements in the triathlon.

== Legend ==
Symbol/Column	Description
	Gold medal in the Olympics, Ironman World Championship, ITU World Triathlon Series or ITU Triathlon World Cup Series
	Silver medal in the Olympics, Ironman World Championship, ITU World Triathlon Series or ITU Triathlon World Cup Series
	Bronze medal in the Olympics, Ironman World Championship, ITU World Triathlon Series or ITU Triathlon World Cup Series
(#)	Placement in any major triathlon competition ranked 4th or below
Name	Athlete's name
Country	Athlete's citizenship during competition
Olympics	Placement in the Olympics
Ironman	Placement in the Ironman World Championship
WTS	Placement in the ITU World Triathlon Series
WC	Placement in the ITU Triathlon World Cup Series
Other	Other notable information

== Men ==
Name	Country	Olympics	Ironman	WTS	WC	Other	Ref
Craig Alexander	Australia		2008; 2009; 2011				
Jonas Deichmann	Germany					First man to complete a triathlon around the world covering a distance of 120 long-distance triathlons.	
Rutger Beke	Belgium		2008				
Alistair Brownlee	United Kingdom	(12) 2008; 2012; 2016		2009; 2011			
Jonathan Brownlee	United Kingdom	2012; 2016		2012; 2013; 2014			
Hamish Carter	New Zealand	(26) 2000; 2004					
Bevan Docherty	New Zealand	2004; 2008 (12) 2012					
Jan Frodeno	Germany	2008 (6) 2012	2014; 2015 2016				
Arthur Gilbert	United Kingdom					At 90 years of age, confirmed as the world's oldest competing triathlete in 2011.	
Pete Jacobs	Australia		2011; 2012				
Sebastian Kienle	Germany		2013 2014 2016				
Patrick Lange	Germany		2016 2017			He is the record holder for the Ironman World Championship	
James Lawrence	Canada					Holds record for most triathlons completed in a single year	
Chris Lieto	United States		2009				
Eneko Llanos	Spain	(23) 2000 (20) 2004	2008				
Chris McCormack	Australia		2010; 2007; 2006	1997	1997		
Javier Gomez	Spain	2012		2007; 2008; 2009; 2010; 2011; 2012; 2013; 2014	2006; 2007; 2008		
Andreas Raelert	Germany	(12) 2000 (6) 2004	2009; 2010; 2011; 2012; 2015				
Jan Rehula	Czech Republic	2000					
Sven Riederer	Switzerland	2004 (23) 2008					
Lionel Sanders	Canada		2017; 2021				
Marino Vanhoenacker	Belgium		2010				
Stephan Vuckovic	Germany	2000					
Simon Whitfield	Canada	2000 (11) 2004; 2008 (DNF) 2012				First man to win a gold medal at the Olympics	

== Women ==
Name	Country	Olympics	Ironman	WTS	WC	Other	Ref
Kate Allen	Austria	2004 (14) 2008					
Erin Densham	Australia	(22) 2008; 2012					
Vanessa Fernandes	Portugal	(8) 2004; 2008					
Jude Flannery	United States					From 1991-96, won six US age group national championship and four world age-group triathlon championships.	
Loretta Harrop	Australia	(5) 2000; 2004					
Helen Jenkins	United Kingdom	(5) 2000; 2004					
Michellie Jones	Australia	2000					
Brigitte McMahon	Switzerland	2000 (10) 2004				First women to win a gold medal at the Olympics	
Magali Messmer	Switzerland	2000 (13) 2008					
Emma Moffatt	Australia	2008 (DNF) 2012					
Lisa Norden	Sweden	(18) 2008; 2012					
Daniela Ryf	Switzerland	(7) 2008 (40) 2012	2015 2016 2017			Current overall and "m-dot" record holder;	
Emma Snowsill	Australia	2008					
Nicola Spirig	Switzerland	(19) 2004 (6) 2008; 2012					
Chrissie Wellington	United Kingdom		2007; 2008; 2009; 2011			WC record holder 2009–2012; undefeated at the Ironman distance	
Susan Williams	United States	2004					
