= List of Olympic medalists in triathlon =

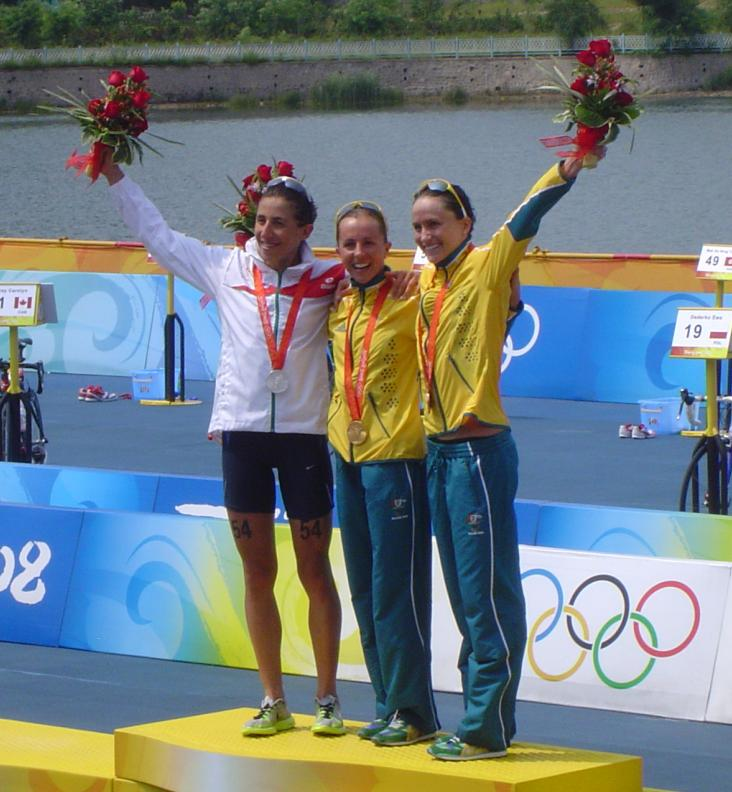
The medalists of the 2008 Summer Olympics women's triathlon. Left to right: Vanessa Fernandes of Portugal (silver), and Emma Snowsill (gold) and Emma Moffatt (bronze) of Australia.

Triathlon has been an Olympic sport since its debut at the 2000 Summer Olympics in Sydney, Australia. Its inclusion in the Summer Olympic Games program was the quickest of any sport: the International Triathlon Union (ITU) was founded in 1989 and five years later, on 4 September 1994, triathlon's Olympic status was approved by the 103rd International Olympic Committee Session, in Paris. The variant contested at the Olympics (called Olympic distance) is composed of a 1,500-meter (4,921 ft) swim, followed by a 40-kilometer (25 mi) bicycle race, and a final 10 km (6 mi) run leg. The distances were chosen based on the resulting format to be a challenge for participants (sprint triathletes as well as endurance competitors) and entertaining for spectators all over the world.

== History ==
=== Early editions : Canada, New Zealand and Australia lead the charge, Alpine glory for women. ===
From 2000, the triathlon competition consisted of a men's and a women's event. A third event, the mixed medley relay involving four triathletes each covering the sprint distance, was introduced in 2021. The inaugural women's event was the first to be contested during the Sydney Games, and crowned Swiss triathlete Brigitte McMahon as the first Olympic champion, over the heavy-favorite Australians. The following day, Simon Whitfield of Canada, who was not considered one of the favorites, came from behind and took the men's gold medal with a 200-meter sprint finish. In similar fashion, long-distance specialist Kate Allen of Austria secured the women's Olympic title in 2004. New Zealand placed two male triathletes in the top two, as Hamish Carter and Bevan Docherty won the gold and silver medals, respectively. At the 2008 Summer Olympics, Whitfield was on the verge of repeating his 2000 success, but failed to keep his lead over Jan Frodeno of Germany in the final meters, who pipped the Canadian to the gold medal. The Australian power in women's triathlon was rewarded at the Beijing Games, when three-time world champion and favorite Emma Snowsill clinched the gold medal and Emma Moffatt secured the bronze.

After securing a second career Olympic medal in Beijing, Simon Whitfield (one gold and one silver) and Bevan Docherty (one silver and one bronze) were the only triathletes to have won more than one Olympic medal.

=== 2012 onwards : Great Britain control, Bermuda wins first gold and France ascends. ===
Despite having a number of world champions in the sport, before the home games of 2012, Great Britain had failed to win a single medal in the sport at Olympic level. This changed dramatically in 2012 itself when the Leeds-based brothers, Alistair and Jonathan Brownlee took gold and bronze in the men's individual event with a surging run, in the company of Spanish silver medalist Javier Gómez. In Rio 2016, the brothers both returned to the Olympic event, sweeping the podium with Alistar claiming gold and Jonathan silver. In the women's race, GB also made it to the podium with bronze for Vicky Holland, behind Nicola Spirig Hug claiming silver. The champion of the women's race that year was USA's Gwen Jorgensen.

In 2021 at the delayed 2020 Summer Olympics, Jonathan Brownlee became the first triathlete to win three medals, help leading Great Britain to victory in the inaugural mixed relay event in a team composed of individual silver medalists Alex Yee and Georgia Taylor-Brown. These athletes joined the two-medal club along with Katie Zaferes of the United States.

In 2024, both races took place on the same day since the men's race, initially scheduled a day prior, was rescheduled due to poor water quality in the Seine. In the women's race, home favorite Cassandre Beaugrand took the women's title, claiming France's first Olympic medal in the sport on home soil. Switzerland's Julie Derron won silver, crossing the finish line right ahead of Beth Potter, who was one of the top seeds after winning the Paris test event in 2023. In the men's race, in a shocking finish closing a fifteen-second gap in the last 400m of the race, Alex Yee claimed gold after passing a close rival, Hayden Wilde of New Zealand. France's Léo Bergère claimed bronze, the first male French medalist in the Olympic event.

== Men ==
=== Individual ===
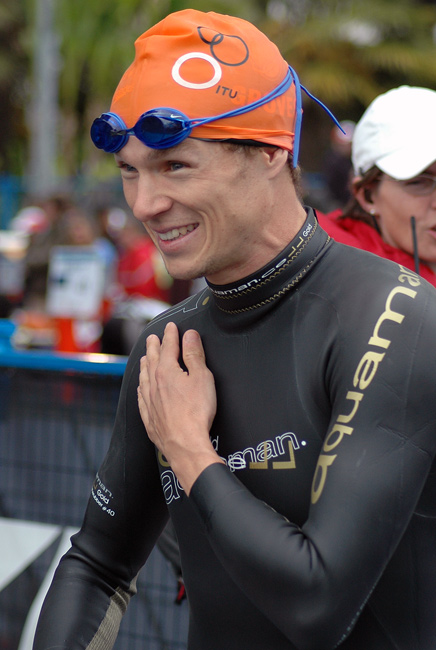
Canadian Simon Whitfield was the first gold medalist in the men's Olympic triathlon, in 2000.

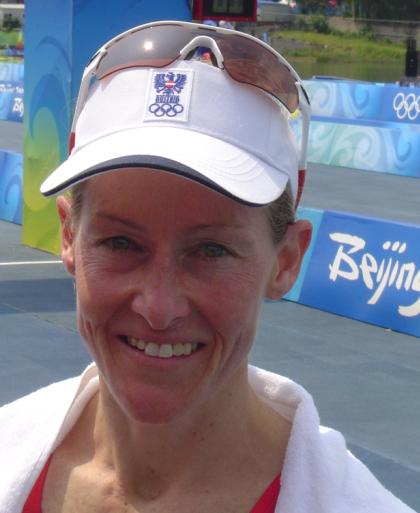
Kate Allen of Austria came from behind to win the 2004 women's Olympic triathlon event.

Games	Gold	Silver	Bronze
2000 Sydney	Simon Whitfield; Canada	Stephan Vuckovic; Germany	Jan Řehula; Czech Republic
2004 Athens	Hamish Carter; New Zealand	Bevan Docherty; New Zealand	Sven Riederer; Switzerland
2008 Beijing	Jan Frodeno; Germany	Simon Whitfield; Canada	Bevan Docherty; New Zealand
2012 London	Alistair Brownlee; Great Britain	Javier Gómez Noya; Spain	Jonny Brownlee; Great Britain
2016 Rio	Alistair Brownlee; Great Britain	Jonny Brownlee; Great Britain	Henri Schoeman; South Africa
2020 Tokyo	Kristian Blummenfelt; Norway	Alex Yee; Great Britain	Hayden Wilde; New Zealand
2024 Paris	Alex Yee; Great Britain	Hayden Wilde; New Zealand	Léo Bergère; France
2028 Los Angeles			

== Women ==
=== Individual ===
Games	Gold	Silver	Bronze
2000 Sydney	Brigitte McMahon; Switzerland	Michellie Jones; Australia	Magali Messmer; Switzerland
2004 Athens	Kate Allen; Austria	Loretta Harrop; Australia	Susan Williams; United States
2008 Beijing	Emma Snowsill; Australia	Vanessa Fernandes; Portugal	Emma Moffatt; Australia
2012 London	Nicola Spirig; Switzerland	Lisa Nordén; Sweden	Erin Densham; Australia
2016 Rio	Gwen Jorgensen; United States	Nicola Spirig Hug; Switzerland	Vicky Holland; Great Britain
2020 Tokyo	Flora Duffy; Bermuda	Georgia Taylor-Brown; Great Britain	Katie Zaferes; United States
2024 Paris	Cassandre Beaugrand; France	Julie Derron; Switzerland	Beth Potter; Great Britain
2028 Los Angeles			

== Mixed ==
=== Team relay ===
Games	Gold	Silver	Bronze
2020 Tokyo	Great Britain; Jess Learmonth; Jonny Brownlee; Georgia Taylor-Brown; Alex Yee	United States; Katie Zaferes; Kevin McDowell; Taylor Knibb; Morgan Pearson	France; Léonie Périault; Dorian Coninx; Cassandre Beaugrand; Vincent Luis
2024 Paris	Germany; Tim Hellwig; Lisa Tertsch; Lasse Lührs; Laura Lindemann	United States; Seth Rider; Taylor Spivey; Morgan Pearson; Taylor Knibb	Great Britain; Alex Yee; Georgia Taylor-Brown; Sam Dickinson; Beth Potter
2028 Los Angeles			

== Statistics ==
=== Multiple medalists ===
Rank	Athlete	Nation	Olympics	Gold	Silver	Bronze	Total
1	Alex Yee	Great Britain	2020–2024	2	1	1	4
2	Alistair Brownlee	Great Britain	2012–2016	2	0	0	2
3	Jonny Brownlee	Great Britain	2012–2020	1	1	1	3
3	Georgia Taylor-Brown	Great Britain	2020–2024	1	1	1	3
5	Simon Whitfield	Canada	2000–2008	1	1	0	2
5	Nicola Spirig	Switzerland	2012–2016	1	1	0	2
7	Cassandre Beaugrand	France	2020–2024	1	0	1	2
8	Taylor Knibb	United States	2020–2024	0	2	0	2
8	Morgan Pearson	United States	2020–2024	0	2	0	2
10	Hayden Wilde	New Zealand	2020–2024	0	1	1	2
10	Bevan Docherty	New Zealand	2004–2008	0	1	1	2
10	Katie Zaferes	United States	2020	0	1	1	2
13	Beth Potter	Great Britain	2024	0	0	2	2

=== Medals by NOC ===
Rank	Nation	Gold	Silver	Bronze	Total
1	Great Britain	4	3	4	11
2	Switzerland	2	2	2	6
3	Germany	2	1	0	3
4	Australia	1	2	2	5
4	New Zealand	1	2	2	5
4	United States	1	2	2	5
7	Canada	1	1	0	2
8	France	1	0	2	3
9	Austria	1	0	0	1
9	Bermuda	1	0	0	1
9	Norway	1	0	0	1
12	Portugal	0	1	0	1
12	Spain	0	1	0	1
12	Sweden	0	1	0	1
15	Czech Republic	0	0	1	1
15	South Africa	0	0	1	1
Totals (16 entries)		16	16	16	48

== See also ==
- ITU Triathlon World Championships
- ITU Triathlon World Cup
