= Triathlon at the 2004 Summer Olympics – Women's =

Women's Triathlon at the Games of the XXVIII Olympiad
- Venue: Vouliagmeni Olympic Centre
- Date: 25 August
- Competitors: 50 from 26 nations
- Winning time: 2:04:43.45

Medalists
1st place, gold medalist(s)		Kate Allen	Austria
2nd place, silver medalist(s)		Loretta Harrop	Australia
3rd place, bronze medalist(s)		Susan Williams	United States

The women's triathlon was part of the Triathlon at the 2004 Summer Olympics programme. It was the second appearance of the event, which was established in 2000. The competition was held on Wednesday, August 26, 2004 at the Vouliagmeni Olympic Centre in Athens. Fifty triathletes from 26 nations competed.

== Competition format ==
The race was held over the "international distance" (also called "Olympic distance") and consisted of 1,500 metres (0.93 mi) swimming, 40 kilometres (25 mi), road cycling, and 10 kilometres (6.2 mi) road running.

== Results ==
Rank	#	Triathlete	Country	Swimming	Cycling	Running	Total time	Difference
1st place, gold medalist(s)	39	Kate Allen	Austria	20:38	1:09:52	34:13	2:04:43.45	—
2nd place, silver medalist(s)	47	Loretta Harrop	Australia	18:37	1:09:05	37:08	2:04:50.17	+0:06.72
3rd place, bronze medalist(s)	34	Susan Williams	United States	19:02	1:08:58	37:08	2:05:08.92	+0:25.47
4	24	Kathleen Smet	Belgium	19:42	1:09:25	36:28	2:05:35.89	+0:52.44
5	26	Nadia Cortassa	Italy	20:36	1:09:51	35:18	2:05:45.35	+1:01.90
6	43	Michelle Dillon	Great Britain	20:37	1:09:50	35:33	2:06:00.77	+1:17.32
7	35	Ana Burgos	Spain	20:36	1:09:52	35:34	2:06:02.36	+1:18.91
8	7	Vanessa Fernandes	Portugal	19:20	1:11:07	35:48	2:06:15.39	+1:31.94
9	32	Barbara Lindquist	United States	18:39	1:09:20	38:26	2:06:25.49	+1:42.04
10	50	Brigitte McMahon Huber	Switzerland	19:46	1:10:41	36:40	2:07:07.73	+2:24.28
11	19	Anja Dittmer	Germany	19:41	1:10:46	36:58	2:07:25.07	+2:41.62
12	15	Akiko Sekine	Japan	20:37	1:09:49	37:08	2:07:34.02	+2:50.57
13	36	Pilar Hidalgo	Spain	19:08	1:11:16	37:13	2:07:37.34	+2:53.89
14	16	Kiyomi Niwata	Japan	20:35	1:09:54	37:13	2:07:42.79	+2:59.34
15	24	Beatrice Lanza	Italy	19:47	1:10:37	37:35	2:07:59.26	+3:15.81
16	20	Joelle Franzmann	Germany	18:55	1:11:33	37:50	2:08:18.33	+3:34.88
17	8	Elizabeth May	Luxembourg	19:43	1:10:45	38:01	2:08:29.22	+3:45.77
18	18	Samantha Warriner	New Zealand	19:42	1:10:45	38:15	2:08:42.07	+3:58.62
19	51	Nicola Spirig	Switzerland	20:34	1:09:51	38:19	2:08:44.46	+4:01.01
20	14	Machiko Nakanishi	Japan	19:40	1:10:45	38:26	2:08:51.06	+4:07.61
21	25	Silvia Gemignani	Italy	18:45	1:11:41	38:30	2:08:56.94	+4:13.49
22	42	Mieke Suys	Belgium	20:26	1:09:59	38:47	2:09:12.57	+4:29.12
23	33	Sheila Taormina	United States	18:37	1:09:23	41:21	2:09:21.08	+4:37.63
24	37	Ainhoa Murua	Spain	19:37	1:10:48	39:02	2:09:27.91	+4:44.46
25	30	Wieke Hoogzaad	Netherlands	19:44	1:10:42	39:21	2:09:47.21	+5:03.76
26	5	Lenka Radová	Czech Republic	19:41	1:10:49	39:24	2:09:54.47	+5:11.02
27	29	Samantha McGlone	Canada	21:27	1:11:59	36:48	2:10:14.24	+5:30.79
28	40	Eva Bramboeck	Austria	20:32	1:09:55	39:52	2:10:19.60	+5:36.15
29	36	Tracy Looze	Netherlands	20:40	1:12:48	37:07	2:10:35.81	+5:52.36
30	44	Julie Dibens	Great Britain	19:21	1:11:08	41:17	2:11:46.01	+7:02.56
31	2	Olga Generalova	Russia	19:48	1:10:41	41:19	2:11:48.06	+7:04.61
32	6	Renata Berková	Czech Republic	19:48	1:13:14	38:48	2:11:50.94	+7:07.49
33	49	Rina Hill	Australia	18:41	1:15:32	37:45	2:11:58.86	+7:15.41
34	45	Jodie Swallow	Great Britain	18:58	1:14:05	42:03	2:15:06.78	+10:23.33
35	28	Carol Montgomery	Canada	19:52	1:15:34	39:59	2:15:25.62	+10:42.17
36	4	Megan Hall	South Africa	19:39	1:16:28	40:19	2:16:26.53	+11:43.08
37	11	Mariana Ohata	Brazil	20:33	1:16:09	40:10	2:16:52.97	+12:09.52
38	9	Erika Molnar	Hungary	20:36	1:17:59	39:18	2:17:53.38	+13:09.93
39	27	Jill Savege	Canada	18:44	1:20:12	39:14	2:18:10.99	+13:27.54
40	22	Wang Hong Ni	China	20:39	1:16:26	41:35	2:18:40.07	+13:56.62
41	46	Yekaterina Shatnaya	Kazakhstan	22:00	1:16:50	40:36	2:19:26.75	+14:43.30
42	17	Fiorella D'Croz	Colombia	20:32	1:18:19	42:12	2:21:03.46	+16:20.01
43	3	Nancy Alvarez	Argentina	20:58	1:17:50	42:50	2:21:38.66	+16:55.21
44	38	Delphine Pelletier	France	20:40	1:18:13	43:46	2:22:39.28	+17:55.83
	1	Nina Anisimova	Russia	19:41	1:16:42	Did not finish		
	21	Lucie Zelenková	Czech Republic	19:23	Did not finish			
	48	Maxine Seear	Australia	19:39	Did not finish			
	12	Sandra Soldan	Brazil	19:41	Did not finish			
	10	Carla Moreno	Brazil	19:48	Did not finish			
	23	Lin Xing	China	19:49	LAP			

- * Including Transition 1 (swimming-to-cycling) and T2 (cycling-to-running), roughly a minute.
- No one is allotted the number 13.
- LAP - Lapped by the leader on the cycling course.
