= List of Summer Olympics venues: T–V =

For the Summer Olympics, there are 24 venues starting with the letter 'T', seven venues starting with the letter 'U', and 17 venues starting with the letter 'V'.

== T ==
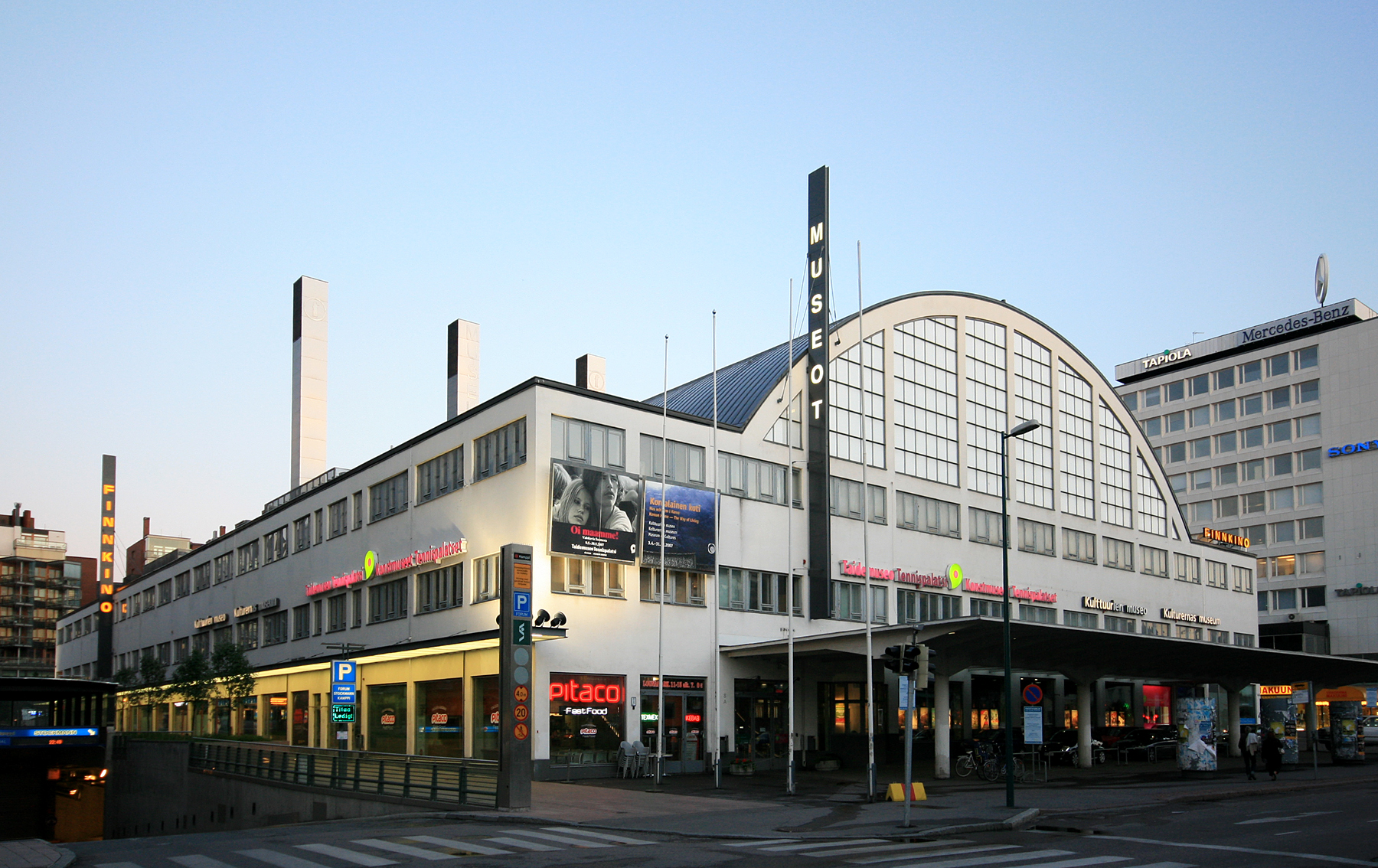
Helsinki's Tennis Palace in 2007. For the 1952 Summer Olympics, the Palace hosted the basketball competitions.

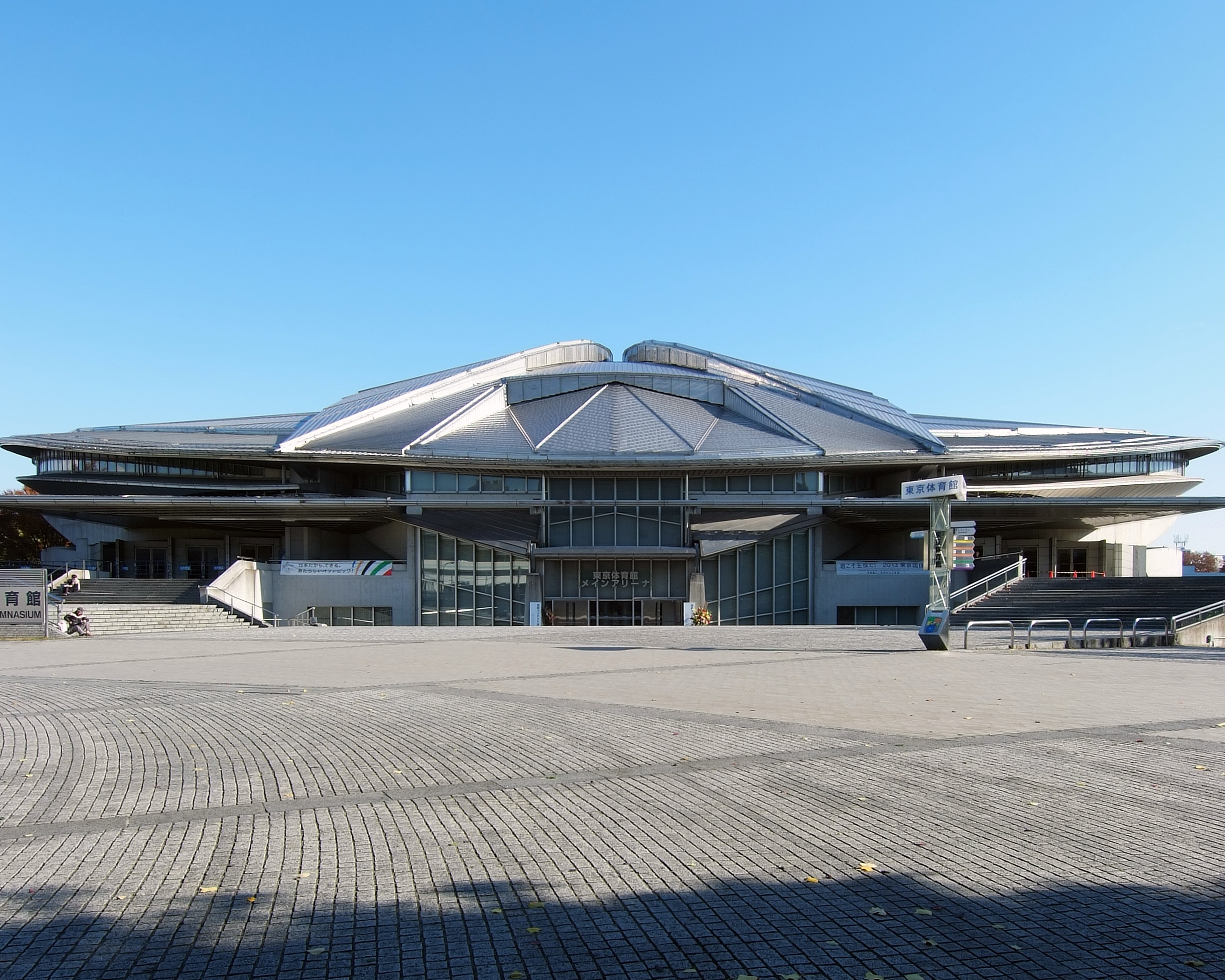
Tokyo Metropolitan Gymnasium in 2008. The venue hosted gymnastics events for the 1964 Summer Olympics.

Venue	Games	Sports	Capacity	Ref.
Taenung International Shooting Range	1988 Seoul	Modern pentathlon (shooting), Shooting	2,505	
Taivallahti	1952 Helsinki	Canoeing	Not listed.	
Tali Race Track	1952 Helsinki	Equestrian (eventing - steeplechase)	Not listed.	
Tampere	1952 Helsinki	Football	17,000	
Tennis Courts	1936 Berlin	Basketball, Fencing (épée)	832.	
Tennis de la Vall d'Hebron	1992 Barcelona	Tennis	8,000	
Tennis Palace	1952 Helsinki	Basketball	1,250	
Tennis Stadium	1936 Berlin	Basketball (final)	Not listed.	
The Dome and Exhibition Complex	2000 Sydney	Badminton, Basketball, Gymnastics (rhythmic), Handball, Modern pentathlon (fencing, shooting), Volleyball (indoor)	10,000	
The Forum	1984 Los Angeles	Basketball	17,505	
Tianjin Olympic Center Stadium	2008 Beijing	Football	60,000	
Titan Gymnasium	1984 Los Angeles	Handball	3,300	
Toda Rowing Course	1964 Tokyo	Rowing	8,300	
Tokorozawa Shooting Range	1964 Tokyo	Shooting (trap)	1,300	
Tokyo Aquatics Centre	2020 Tokyo	Swimming	15,000	
Tokyo International Forum	2020 Tokyo	Weightlifting	5,012	
Tokyo Metropolitan Gymnasium	1964 Tokyo	Gymnastics	6,500	
Tokyo Metropolitan Gymnasium	2020 Tokyo	Table tennis	10,000	
Tokyo Metropolitan Indoor Swimming Pool	1964 Tokyo	Water polo	3,000	
Tokyo Tatsumi International Swimming Center	2020 Tokyo	Water polo	3,635	
Tongillo Road Course	1988 Seoul	Cycling (individual road race, road team time trial)	800	
Torbay	1948 London	Sailing	Not listed.	
Trade Unions' Equestrian Complex	1980 Moscow	Equestrian (all but jumping individual), Modern pentathlon (riding, running)	12,000 (jumping); 3,000 (dressage); 2,000 (indoor arena); 400 (eventing endurance)	
Traneberg	1912 Stockholm	Football	Not listed.	
Triathlon Venue	2008 Beijing	Triathlon	10,000	
Tuileries Garden	1900 Paris	Fencing	Not listed.	
Turku	1952 Helsinki	Football	9,372	
Tweseldown Racecourse	1948 London	Equestrian (eventing)	Not listed.	

== U ==
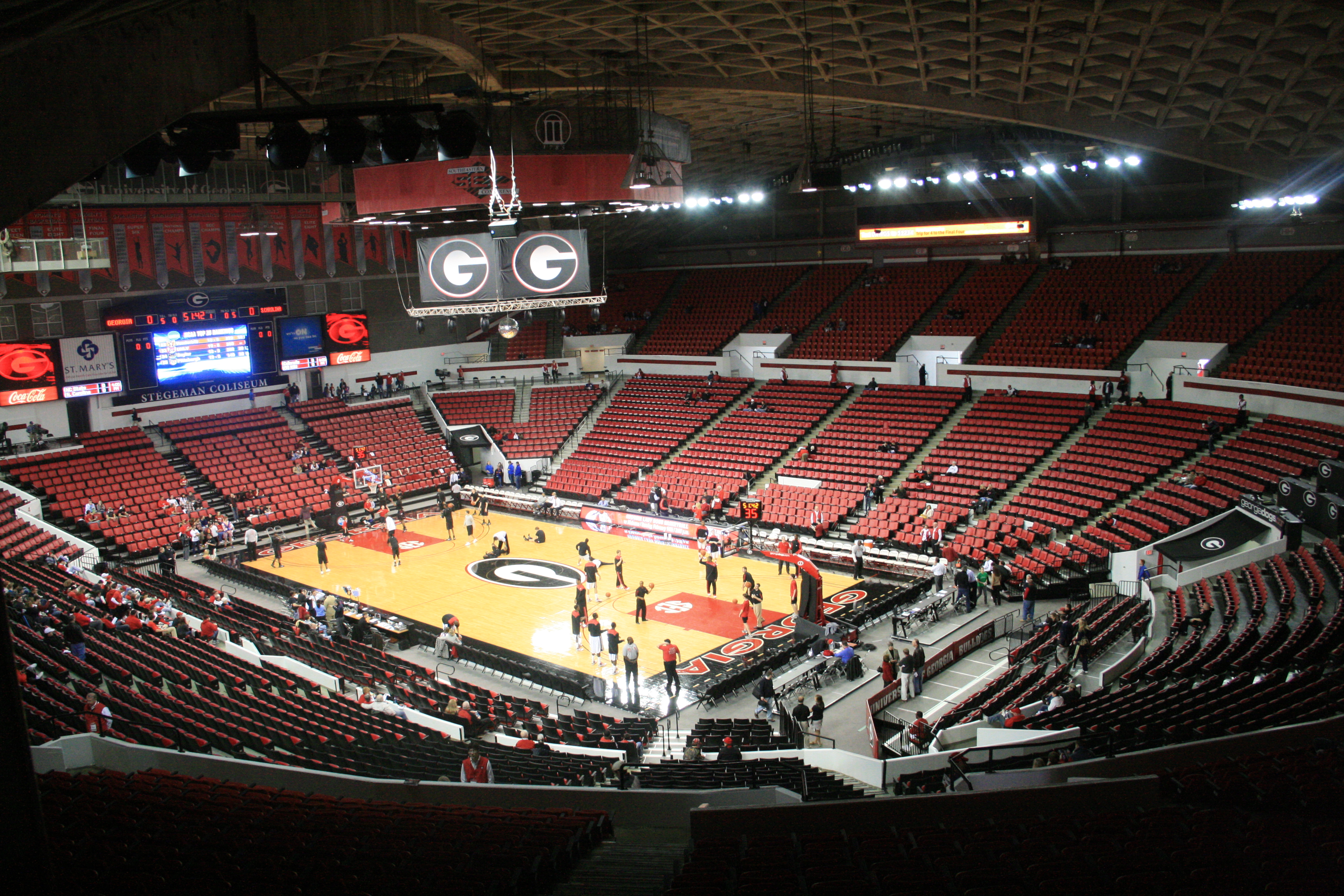
The University of Georgia Coliseum in 2010. For the 1996 Summer Olympics in Atlanta, the venue hosted indoor volleyball and rhythmic gymnastic events.

Venue	Games	Sports	Capacity	Ref.
Ulriksdal	1956 Stockholm	Equestrian (eventing)	Not listed.	
Umberto I Shooting Range	1960 Rome	Modern pentathlon (shooting), Shooting (pistol, rifle)	Not listed.	
University City Swimming Pool	1968 Mexico City	Water polo	4,993	
University of Georgia Coliseum	1996 Atlanta	Gymnastics (rhythmic), Volleyball (indoor)	10,000	
Urban Road Cycling Course	2008 Beijing	Cycling (road race)	Not listed.	
Urban Stadium	1972 Munich	Football	45,548	
Uxendon Shooting School Club	1908 London	Shooting (shotgun)	Not listed.	

== V ==
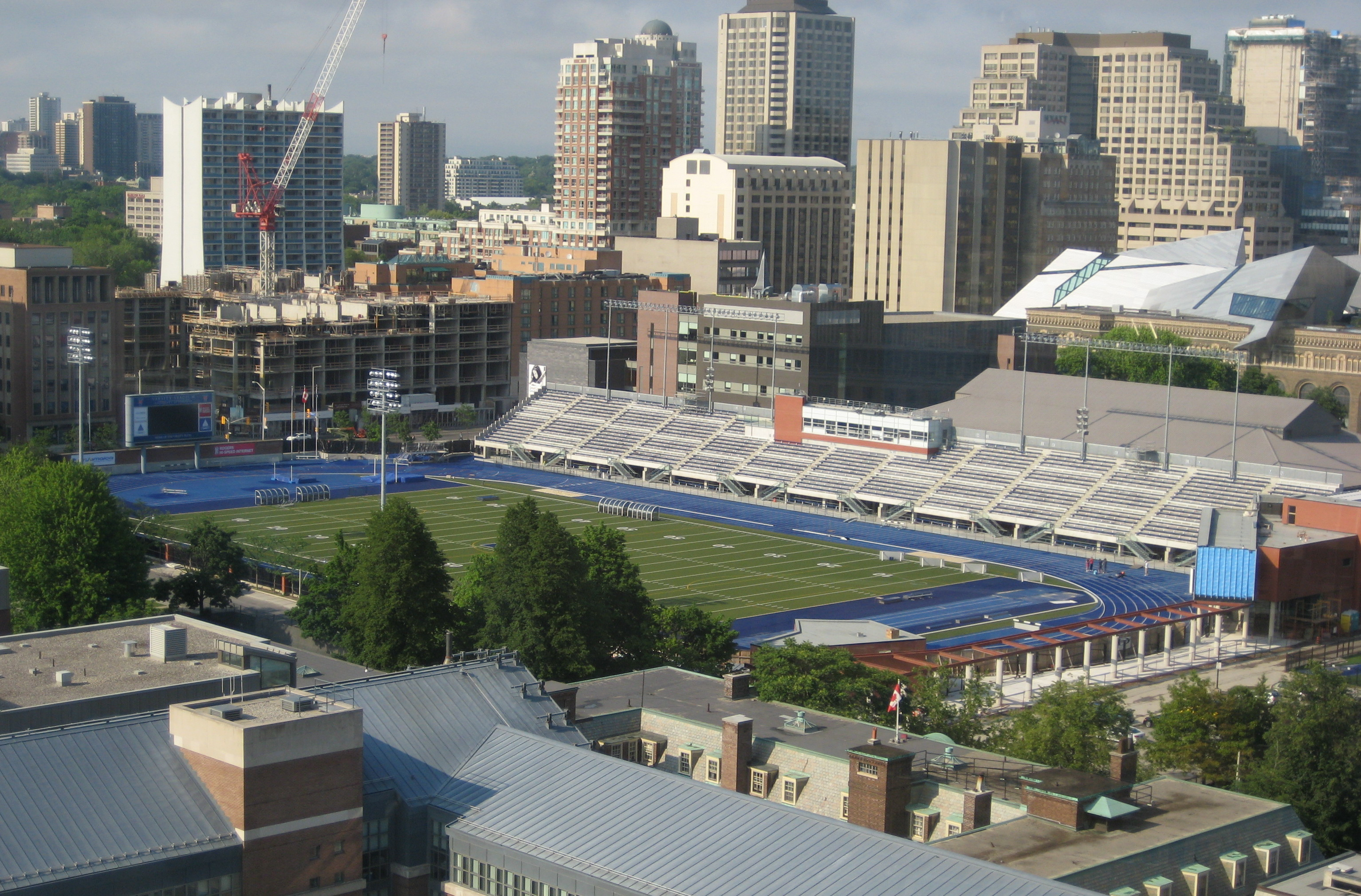
Toronto's Varsity Stadium in 2009. The venue hosted football preliminaries for the 1976 Summer Olympics in Montreal.

Venue	Games	Sports	Capacity	Ref.
Varsity Stadium	1976 Montreal	Football	21,739	
Velodrome	1952 Helsinki	Cycling (track), Field hockey	6,000	
Velodrome	1956 Melbourne	Cycling (track)	7,900	
Velodrome	1992 Barcelona	Cycling (track)	3,800	
Vélodrome d'Anvers Zuremborg	1920 Antwerp	Cycling (track)	Not listed.	
Vélodrome de Vincennes	1900 Paris	Cricket, Cycling, Football, Gymnastics, and Rugby union	Not listed.	
Vélodrome d'hiver	1924 Paris	Boxing, Cycling (track), Fencing, Weightlifting, Wrestling	10,884	
Via Appia Antica	1960 Rome	Athletics (marathon)	Not listed.	
Via Cassia	1960 Rome	Cycling (individual road race)	Not listed.	
Via Flaminia	1960 Rome	Cycling (individual road race)	Not listed.	
Via Cristoforo Colombo	1960 Rome	Athletics (marathon), Cycling (road team time trial)	Not listed.	
Via di Grottarossa	1960 Rome	Cycling (individual road race)	Not listed.	
Vicente Suárez Shooting Range	1968 Mexico City	Modern pentathlon (shooting), Shooting	Not listed.	
Vineyard Avenue	1932 Los Angeles	Cycling (road)	Not listed.	
Virgilio Uribe Rowing and Canoeing Course	1968 Mexico City	Canoeing, Rowing	17,600	
Volleyballhalle	1972 Munich	Volleyball	3,680	
Vouliagmeni Olympic Centre	2004 Athens	Cycling (individual time trial), Triathlon	Not listed.	
