= Triathlon at the Summer Olympics =

- IOC Code: TRI
- Governing body: World Triathlon
- Events: 3 (men: 1; women: 1; mixed: 1)

Summer Olympics
- 1896; 1900; 1904; 1908; 1912; 1920; 1924; 1928; 1932; 1936; 1948; 1952; 1956; 1960; 1964; 1968; 1972; 1976; 1980; 1984; 1988; 1992; 1996; 2000; 2004; 2008; 2012; 2016; 2020; 2024; 2028; 2032
- Medalists

Triathlon had its Summer Olympics debut at the 2000 Games, in Sydney, when men's and women's individual events were first held, and has been contested since then. In 2021, at the delayed 2020 Summer Olympics a mixed team relay event was held for the first time. The sport, and its Olympic events, are governed by the International Triathlon Union, known since 2019 as World Triathlon.

== Summary ==
Games	Year	Events	Best Nation
XXVII	2000	2	Switzerland (1)
XXVIII	2004	2	New Zealand (1)
XXIX	2008	2	Australia (1)
XXX	2012	2	Great Britain (1)
XXXI	2016	2	Great Britain (2)
XXXII	2020	3	Great Britain (3)
XXXIII	2024	3	Great Britain (4)
XXXIV	2028	3	

== History ==
The 2000 Summer Olympics saw the first appearance of the triathlon. 48 women and 52 men competed in separate triathlons. The distances used were the "international" or "standard" ones, with a 1.5 km (0.93 mi) swim, 40 km (25 mi) cycle, and a 10 km (6.2 mi) run. The 2004 triathlon was identical to the first in distance, but the 100-athlete quota was evened between 50 women and 50 men. The quota was further increased to 55 women and 55 men for the 2008 Beijing Olympics and remained the same for London 2012 and Rio 2016.

== Results summary ==
The most successful and the most decorated triathlete in Olympic history is Alex Yee from Great Britain, with two gold medals, one silver and one bronze across two Games (2020 and 2024). He is the only triathlete with four Olympic medals as of 2024, and the only triathlete to win multiple medals in multiple Games (2 each in 2020 and 2024). Only one athlete, Great Britain's Alistair Brownlee, has ever won the individual Olympic triathlon twice (in 2012 and 2016), making him the most successful individual Olympic triathlete as of 2024, while his brother Jonathan Brownlee uniquely won all three different medals in three consecutive Games, bronze in 2012 and silver in 2016 in the individual event behind brother Alistair, and finally a gold in the inaugural team relay in 2020, thus making him at the time the most decorated Olympic triathlete, and the first three-time medalist, later joined by British team-mates Yee (who then surpassed him with four medals) and Georgia Taylor-Brown, the most successful and most decorated female Olympic triathlete with three medals, one of each colour. Yee, Taylor Brown and Brownlee are the only triathletes to have a medal of each colour as of 2024.

Several other athletes have also won two medals, especially since the mixed relay introduced a second opportunity to medal and a greater number of medal winners per Games: these include individual silver and bronze for New Zealanders Bevan Docherty and Hayden Wilde, and two Olympic champions, Canada's Simon Whitfield and Switzerland's Nicola Spirig, who both won a gold, followed by a silver medal. Katie Zaferes, Alex Yee and Georgia Taylor-Brown became the first triathletes to win two medals in the same Games in 2021 with the introduction of the mixed relay, the latter two athletes becoming the most successful triathlete in a single Games with a gold (relay) and a silver (individual) medal. Cassandre Beaugrand won individual gold in 2024 in Paris, after winning relay bronze in Tokyo in 2021, becoming only the second triathlete to win a gold medal at a home Games after Alistair Brownlee in London in 2012. Jonathon Brownlee, Leo Bergere of France in 2024 and Michelle Jones of Australia in Sydney in 2004 have also won medals at home Games.

While six men have won individual medals in two separate Games, with three of them winning gold medals, and the senior Brownlee winning two gold medals, only Nicola Spirig, among women, has won individual medals in two separate Games.

Great Britain is the most successful and decorated nation as of 2024, with eleven medals, all won from 2012 onwards - four gold, three silver and four bronze medals. The British have won at least one medal in every Olympic triathlon race since the women's individual race in 2012, a run that has included four individual men's races, three individual women's races and two mixed relays. New Zealand (2004) and Great Britain (2016) are the only nations to have completed a one-two finish in an individual event.

No nation has yet won both women's and men's individual events at the same Games, or indeed a gold in both races across any Games. Both Germany and Great Britain have won the men's individual and mixed relay events at least once, but neither at the same Games.

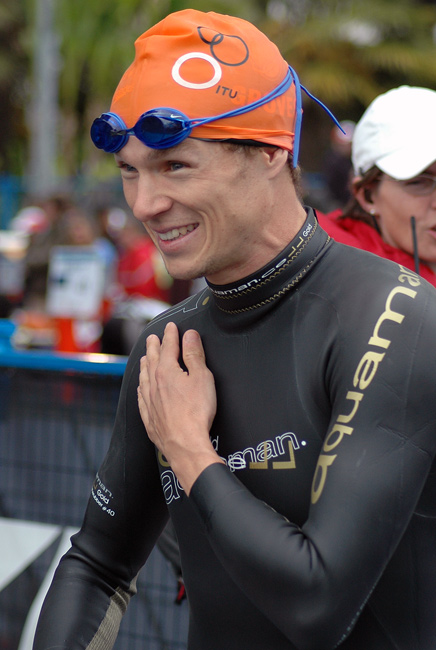
Canadian Simon Whitfield was the first gold medalist in the men's Olympic triathlon, in 2000.

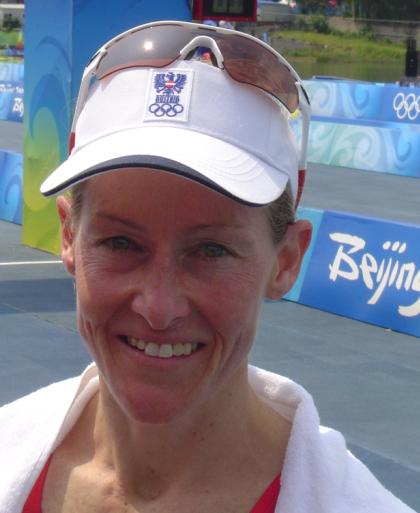
Kate Allen of Austria came from behind to win the 2004 women's Olympic triathlon event.

=== Men ===
Games	Gold	Silver	Bronze
2000 Sydney	Simon Whitfield; Canada	Stephan Vuckovic; Germany	Jan Řehula; Czech Republic
2004 Athens	Hamish Carter; New Zealand	Bevan Docherty; New Zealand	Sven Riederer; Switzerland
2008 Beijing	Jan Frodeno; Germany	Simon Whitfield; Canada	Bevan Docherty; New Zealand
2012 London	Alistair Brownlee; Great Britain	Javier Gómez Noya; Spain	Jonathan Brownlee; Great Britain
2016 Rio de Janeiro	Alistair Brownlee; Great Britain	Jonathan Brownlee; Great Britain	Henri Schoeman; South Africa
2020 Tokyo	Kristian Blummenfelt; Norway	Alex Yee; Great Britain	Hayden Wilde; New Zealand
2024 Paris	Alex Yee; Great Britain	Hayden Wilde; New Zealand	Léo Bergère; France
2028 Los Angeles			

=== Women ===
Games	Gold	Silver	Bronze
2000 Sydney	Brigitte McMahon; Switzerland	Michellie Jones; Australia	Magali Messmer; Switzerland
2004 Athens	Kate Allen; Austria	Loretta Harrop; Australia	Susan Williams; United States
2008 Beijing	Emma Snowsill; Australia	Vanessa Fernandes; Portugal	Emma Moffatt; Australia
2012 London	Nicola Spirig; Switzerland	Lisa Nordén; Sweden	Erin Densham; Australia
2016 Rio de Janeiro	Gwen Jorgensen; United States	Nicola Spirig Hug; Switzerland	Vicky Holland; Great Britain
2020 Tokyo	Flora Duffy; Bermuda	Georgia Taylor-Brown; Great Britain	Katie Zaferes; United States
2024 Paris	Cassandre Beaugrand; France	Julie Derron; Switzerland	Beth Potter; Great Britain
2028 Los Angeles			

=== Mixed relay ===
Games	Gold	Silver	Bronze
2020 Tokyo	Great Britain; Jessica Learmonth; Jonathan Brownlee; Georgia Taylor-Brown; Alex Yee	United States; Katie Zaferes; Kevin McDowell; Taylor Knibb; Morgan Pearson	France; Léonie Périault; Dorian Coninx; Cassandre Beaugrand; Vincent Luis
2024 Paris	Germany; Tim Hellwig; Lisa Tertsch; Lasse Lührs; Laura Lindemann	United States; Seth Rider; Taylor Spivey; Morgan Pearson; Taylor Knibb	Great Britain; Alex Yee; Georgia Taylor-Brown; Sam Dickinson; Beth Potter
2028 Los Angeles			

== Medal table ==
16 nations have split the forty-eight medals awarded in the triathlon events, accurate as of the conclusion of the 2024 Olympic Games.

Rank	Nation	Gold	Silver	Bronze	Total
1	Great Britain	4	3	4	11
2	Switzerland	2	2	2	6
3	Germany	2	1	0	3
4	Australia	1	2	2	5
4	New Zealand	1	2	2	5
4	United States	1	2	2	5
7	Canada	1	1	0	2
8	France	1	0	2	3
9	Austria	1	0	0	1
9	Bermuda	1	0	0	1
9	Norway	1	0	0	1
12	Portugal	0	1	0	1
12	Spain	0	1	0	1
12	Sweden	0	1	0	1
15	Czech Republic	0	0	1	1
15	South Africa	0	0	1	1
Totals (16 entries)		16	16	16	48

=== Multiple medalists ===
As of 2024, the following triathletes have won two or more medals in Olympic triathlon.

Rank	Athlete	Nation	Years	Gold	Silver	Bronze	Total	Notes
1	Alex Yee	Great Britain	2020-2024	2	1	1	4	
2	Alistair Brownlee	Great Britain	2008-2016	2	0	0	2	
3	Jonathan Brownlee	Great Britain	2012-2020	1	1	1	3	
3	Georgia Taylor-Brown	Great Britain	2020-2024	1	1	1	3	
5	Simon Whitfield	Canada	2000-2004	1	1	0	2	
5	Nicola Spirig	Switzerland	2012-2016	1	1	0	2	
7	Cassandre Beaugrand	France	2020-2024	1	0	1	2	
8	Morgan Pearson	United States	2020-2024	0	2	0	2	
8	Taylor Knibb	United States	2020-2024	0	2	0	2	
10	Hayden Wilde	New Zealand	2020-2024	0	1	1	2	
10	Bevan Docherty	New Zealand	2004-2008	0	1	1	2	
10	Katie Zaferes	United States	2016-2020	0	1	1	2	
13	Beth Potter	Great Britain	2024	0	0	2	2	

== Qualification ==
Qualification spots in the triathlon are allotted to National Olympic Committees (NOCs) rather than to individual athletes.

There are five ways for NOCs to earn spots in the triathlon. NOCs can earn a maximum of three spots, though only eight nations may earn that many. Nations beyond that may earn only two spots.

The first five spots go to the winners of the five regional qualifying tournaments. Three more spots go to the top three triathletes of the most recent Triathlon World Championships, though any athlete that won a regional tournament is skipped in that determination. The next 39 places go to the NOCs of those athletes highest in the ITU ranking (again, skipping those athletes that have already qualified in the first two methods). A forty-eighth place is awarded to the host country if it has not already received a spot, or to the next highest ranked athlete if the host country has. Two places are awarded by the Tripartite Commission. In the end, further five places are distributed to the NOCs without any quota through the ITU Points List, with one place for each continent.

== Competition format ==
The Olympic triathlon is composed of two medal events, one for men and the other for women. Both use the same distances of 1.5 km, 40 km, and 10 km. Mass starts are used and drafting is allowed during the cycling phase.

Because of the variability of courses and uncontrollable conditions, official time based records are not kept for the triathlon. This rule applies to Olympic games as well.

=== Changes for Tokyo 2020 ===
In the Olympic games, held in Tokyo, there was an inclusion of a mixed relay race. Teams of two men and two women competed on a course consisting of a 300m swim, 8 km cycle, and 2 km run before tagging a teammate.

== Nations ==
The following nations have taken part in the triathlon competition.

Nation	96	00	04	08	12	20	24	28	32	36	48	52	56	60	64	68	72	76	80	84	88	92	96	00	04	08	12	16	20	24	Years
Argentina																								1	2		1	2	1	1	5
Australia																								6	6	5	6	6	6	4	6
Austria																								1	3	4	2	3	4	4	6
Azerbaijan																												1	1	1	2
Barbados																												1		1	1
Belgium																								2	2	2	2	4	4	4	6
Bermuda																									1	1	2	1	1	3	5
Brazil																								6	6	3	3	2	3	4	6
Canada																								4	5	6	5	5	4	3	6
Chile																								1		1	2	1	2	2	5
China																								2	2	3	2	2	1	1	6
Colombia																								1	1		1			1	3
Costa Rica																								1			1	1			3
Czech Republic																								4	5	3	4	1	2	1	6
Denmark																								2	1	1	2	1		2	5
Ecuador																											1	1	1	1	3
Estonia																									1	1		1	1		4
France																								6	4	5	6	5	5	6	6
Germany																								4	5	6	6	5	4	6	6
Great Britain																								6	6	5	6	6	5	5	6
Greece																								1	1	1					3
Guam																														1	1
Hong Kong																									1	2			1	1	3
Hungary																								4	2	2	1	4	4	3	6
Ireland																										1	2	2	2		4
Iceland																														1	1
Israel																												1	2	1	2
Italy																								3	3	4	3	4	5	5	6
Jamaica																								1							1
Japan																								6	5	5	5	4	4	3	6
Jordan																												1			1
Kazakhstan																								2	3	1				1	3
Luxembourg																								1	1	2			1	1	4
Mauritius																											1	1		1	2
Mexico																									2	2	2	5	4	4	5
Monaco																											1				1
Morocco																													1	1	1
Netherlands																								6	2	2	2	2	4	4	6
Netherlands Antilles																								1							1
New Zealand																								4	4	2	6	4	4	4	6
Norway																												1	4	4	2
Poland																										3	3	1		1	3
Portugal																									1	3	2	3	3	4	5
Russia																								1	3	5	5	6	4		6
Romania																													1	1	1
Slovakia																										1	1	1			3
Slovenia																											1	1			2
South Africa																								2	2	2	3	4	4	3	6
South Korea																											1				1
Spain																								4	6	4	6	6	5	5	6
Sweden																								1		1	1	1		1	4
Switzerland																								6	5	6	4	4	4	4	6
Syria																										1			1		2
Togo																														1	1
Ukraine																								2	2	3	2	1	1		6
United States																								6	6	6	5	6	5	6	6
Venezuela																								1	1						2
Zimbabwe																								1		1	1				3
Nations																								34	34	37	39	41	38	42	
Competitors																								100	100	110	110	110	110	110	
Year	96	00	04	08	12	20	24	28	32	36	48	52	56	60	64	68	72	76	80	84	88	92	96	00	04	08	12	16	20	24	

== See also ==
- List of Olympic venues in triathlon
- Triathlon at the Pan American Games
- Athletics at the 1904 Summer Olympics – Men's triathlon
- Gymnastics at the 1904 Summer Olympics – Men's triathlon
