= Eva Dollinger =

Austrian triathlete

Eva Maria Dollinger (née Bramböck; born 10 April 1978 in Wörgl) is an Austrian triathlete.

She competed at the second Olympic triathlon at the 2004 Summer Olympics and took twenty-eighth place with a total time of 2:10:19.60.

In August 2005 she married Helmut Dollinger.

She also competed in the 2008 Olympic triathlon but did not finish the race.
