= Xing Lin =

Chinese triathlete

Xing Lin (Chinese: 邢琳; pinyin: Xíng Lín; born May 25, 1979, in Liaoning) is a female Chinese triathlete. Xing competed at the second Olympic triathlon at the 2004 Summer Olympics but did not finish the race. She also competed at the 2008 Summer Olympics.
