= Simon Whitfield =

Canadian triathlete (born 1975)

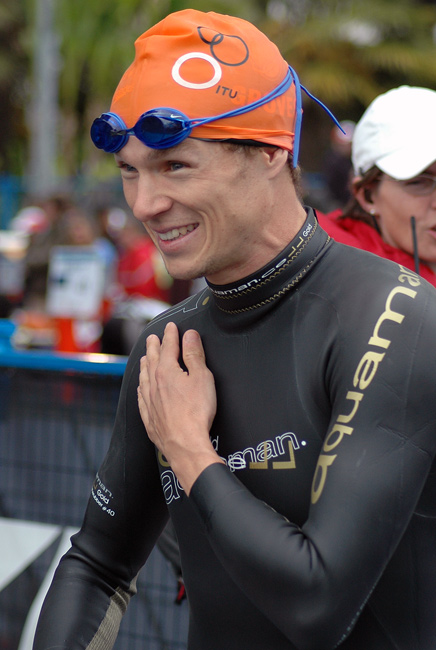

Personal information
- Full name: Simon St. Quentin Whitfield
- Born: 16 May 1975 (age 51) Kingston, Ontario, Canada
- Height: 1.77 m (5 ft 10 in)
- Weight: 70 kg (154 lb)

Sport
- Country: Canada
Medal record
Triathlon
Representing Canada
Olympic Games
Gold medal – first place	2000 Sydney	Men's competition
Silver medal – second place	2008 Beijing	Men's competition
Commonwealth Games
Gold medal – first place	2002 Manchester	Men's competition
Pan American Games
Bronze medal – third place	1999 Winnipeg	Men's competition

Simon St. Quentin Whitfield (born 16 May 1975) is a Canadian retired Olympic triathlon champion. Whitfield won ten consecutive Canadian Triathlon Championships titles and carried the Canadian national flag during the 2000 Summer Olympics closing ceremony in Sydney, where he had won his gold medal, and the opening ceremony at the 2012 Summer Olympics in London, making him one of few Canadian athletes to be honoured twice as Olympic flag bearer.

== Biography ==
Born in Kingston, Ontario, Whitfield played soccer as a boy before taking up triathlon at age 11and developing his skills in the Canadian Kids of Steel program. By age 15, he was pursuing triathlon on a serious competitive basis.

Whitfield won a gold medal in the triathlon at the 2000 Summer Olympics in Sydney, Australia. He got up off the ground after he and 14 other riders crashed in the bike race portion of the event and worked his way back near the leaders. In the foot race, he cut down the field one at a time then put on a finishing kick to take the victory. His final time was 1:48:24.02, which until 2012 stood as the fastest Olympic triathlon.

In the 2002 Commonwealth Games in Manchester, England he claimed gold again. He ended up in 11th place at the 2004 Summer Olympics with a time of 1:53:15.81.

Whitfield was named to the 2008 Summer Olympics team and won a silver medal while competing at his third consecutive games. With a time of 1:48:58, he finished 5 seconds behind the German gold medalist. Whitfield's accomplishment was made even more impressive considering he was a distant fourth behind the lead three runners heading into the final kilometre of the run before he burst forth into the lead with 200 metres remaining. Whitfield, exhausted by his effort to get back into the lead, was then passed by the eventual winner Jan Frodeno of Germany at the end of the race.

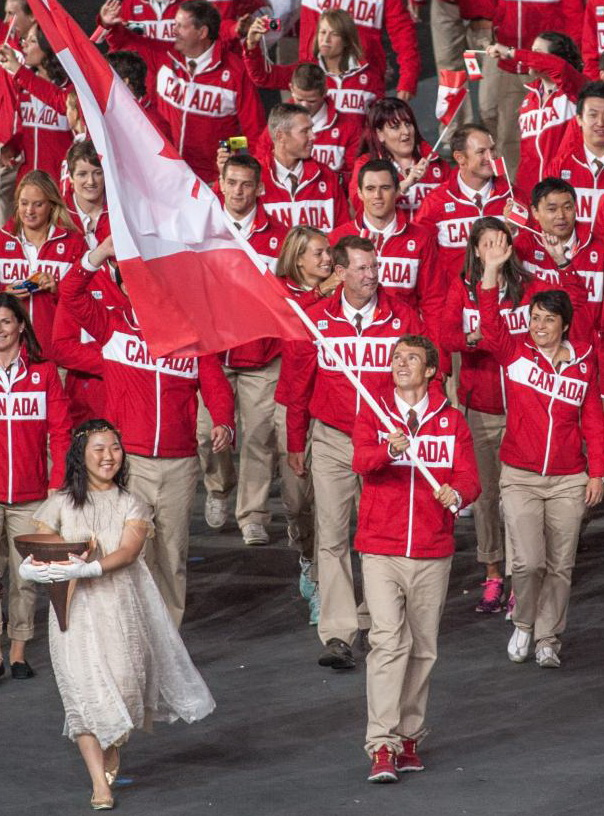
Whitfield as flag bearer at the 2012 Olympic Opening Ceremonies

Whitfield competed at the 2012 London Olympics in Triathlon. After finishing 15th in the swim Whitfield was riding out of transition in his aero-bars when he was caught off balance going over a speed bump, falling off of his bike and breaking his collar bone, forcing him to drop out of the race. Although disappointed, Whitfield remained composed and tactful, apologizing to a fellow athlete who was involved in the crash. Throughout the Olympics Whitfield continued to defend fellow triathlete and Olympic competitor Paula Findlay from the media when she came last in the women's triathlon in the London games.

Whitfield retired in 2013. At present, Whitfield lives in Victoria, British Columbia and maintains his second residence at Salt Spring Island.

== Awards and honours ==
In 2017, Whitfeld was awarded the Order of Sport, marking induction into Canada's Sports Hall of Fame.

Olympic Games
Preceded by initial event	Olympic Gold; Men's Triathlon; 2000	Succeeded by Hamish Carter
Preceded by Bevan Docherty	Olympic Silver; Men's Triathlon; 2008	Succeeded by Javier Gómez
Preceded by Clara Hughes	Flagbearer for Canada at the Olympics; London 2012	Succeeded by Hayley Wickenheiser
