= Susan Williams (triathlete) =

American triathlete

Personal information
- Born: June 17, 1969 (age 57) Long Beach, California, U.S.
Medal record
Women's triathlon
Representing United States
Olympic Games
Bronze medal – third place	2004 Athens	Individual

Susan Rene Bartholomew-Williams (born June 17, 1969 in Long Beach, California) is a triathlete from the United States.

She competed at the second Olympic triathlon at the 2004 Summer Olympics. She was the first U.S. triathlete to win an Olympic medal by taking the bronze in 2004 in Athens. She placed third with a total time of 2:05:08.92. Her split times were 19:02 for the swim, 1:08:58 for the cycling, and 0:37:08 for the run.

Williams obtained a Master of Science in Aerospace Engineering Sciences and was working toward becoming an astronaut when her success at triathlon convinced her to give it a try.

== See also ==
- Triathlon at the Summer Olympics
- List of Olympic medalists in triathlon
