= Kate Allen (triathlete) =

Australian-Austrian triathlete

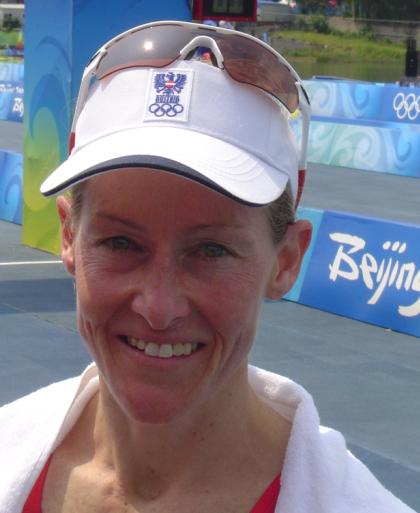
- Allen at the 2008 Summer Olympics

Personal information
- Full name: Katherine Jessie Jean Allen
- Born: 25 April 1970 (age 56) Geelong, Australia
Medal record
Women's triathlon
Representing Austria
Olympic Games
Gold medal – first place	2004 Athens	Individual

Katherine Jessie Jean "Kate" Allen (born 25 April 1970, in Geelong, Australia) is an Australian-Austrian triathlete. She won the gold medal in the women's triathlon at the 2004 Summer Olympics in Athens.

== Early life ==
Kate Allen grew up on a 1,000-hectare (2,500-acre) sheep-farming property with her three brothers at Teesdale, Victoria in southeastern Australia.

From an early age her parents encouraged her to run, and she used to frequently jog to primary school some 3 kilometres from home. At the age of four Allen began participating in Little Athletics at Landy Field in Geelong. She competed in junior athletics until the age of 14, winning a number of championships over 1500 m and 'cross-country' distance. Allen also enjoyed gymnastics in her early years, a sport that would prove important to her coordination skills during her triathlon career.

Allen graduated from Ballarat University as a nurse at age 20. She then travelled overseas. During one of her trips she met Marcel Diechtler in Kitzbühel, whom she married in 1999, who was a triathlon competitor for Austria. Diechtler encouraged Allen to take up triathlon, beginning in 1996.

== Triathlon career ==
After some years of successful racing around Europe with her husband and coach Marcel Diechtler, Allen received Austrian citizenship in 2002 and started racing in the World Cup. She took silver in only her third World Cup in Hamburg, Germany and won silver at the European Championships in Valencia, Spain.

Just eight years after beginning the sport, Allen won the 2004 Olympic triathlon in Athens. At the end of the swim leg Allen was in 44th place in the field of 51. After the bicycle leg she was in 28th. During the run she progressively overtook twenty seven competitors to power past then-leader Australian Loretta Harrop just 150 metres from the finish line, winning the race in emphatic style.

Alongside her Olympic distance triathlon career, Allen showed several strong performances in racing at the Ironman distance. In 2002, she recorded the fastest Ironman debut time ever, completing the course in 8:58:24. She topped her performance in 2003, finishing in 8:54:01 hours, a personal record that still stands.

After the Olympic Games in Athens it was Allen's plan to only race at Ironman distances for 2005–2006, with the aim of winning the Ironman World Championships in Hawaii. After finishing 7th in 2002, Allen placed 5th in both 2005 and 2006.

During the ITU New Plymouth BG Triathlon World Cup in New Zealand in April 2008, Allen had a bike crash at 60 km/h (37 mph) and suffered serious injuries.

At the 2008 Summer Olympics, she ranked 14th.

Achievements:

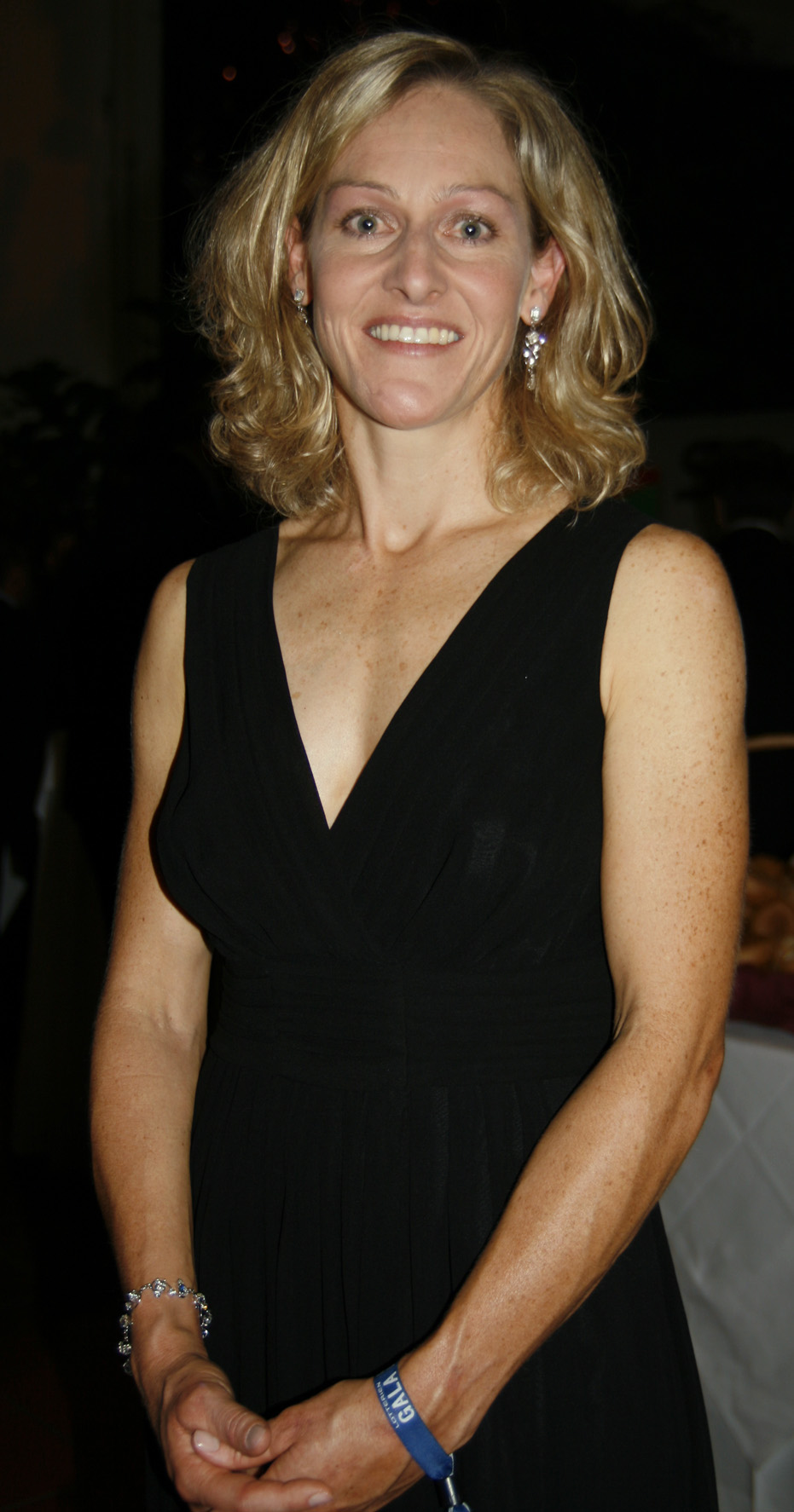
Kate Allen, 2008

2002

- 2nd place, Ironman Austria, Klagenfurt/Austria (08:58:24 hrs. - fastest Ironman debut in history)
- 7th place, Ironman Hawaii, Kona/United States (09:38:40 hrs.)

2003

- 1st place, Ironman Austria, Klagenfurt/Austria (08:54:01 hrs.)
- 1st place, ITU Triathlon International race, Geneva/Switzerland
- 2nd place, ITU Triathlon World Cup, Hamburg/Germany
- 4th place, ITU Triathlon World Cup, Makuhari/Japan
- 6th place, ITU Triathlon World Cup, Geelong/Australia
- Austrian Champion 2003 Triathlon Olympic Distance
- Austrian Champion 2003 Triathlon Ironman Distance

2004

- Olympic Champion, Athens/Greece
- Vice-European Champion, Valencia/Spain
- Austrian Sports Personality of the Year

2005

- 1st place, Ironman Austria, Klagenfurt/Austria (9:07:03 hrs.)
- 5th place, Ironman Hawaii, Kona/USA (9:22:08 hrs.)

2006

- 1st place, Vienna City half-marathon (1:14:24 hrs.)
- 5th place, Ironman Hawaii, Kona/USA (9:30:22 hrs.)

2007

- Vice-European Champion, Copenhagen/Denmark
- Vice-European Champion Team, Copenhagen/Danmark
- 3rd place, ITU Triathlon World Cup, Salford/United Kingdom

2008

- 8th place, World Championships Vancouver/Canada
- 14th place, Beijing Olympics

== Awards ==
In 2004, Kate Allen received the "Decoration of Honour for Services to the Republic of Austria" (Goldenes Ehrenzeichen für Verdienste um die Republik Österreich).

She was voted 2004 Austrian Sportspersonality of the year and also received the Eurosport "SportStar Award 2004".

Awards
Preceded by (Austria) Michaela Dorfmeister	Austrian Sportswoman of the year 2004	Succeeded by (Austria) Renate Götschl
