= Nicola Spirig =

Swiss triathlete (born 1982)

Nicola Spirig Hug
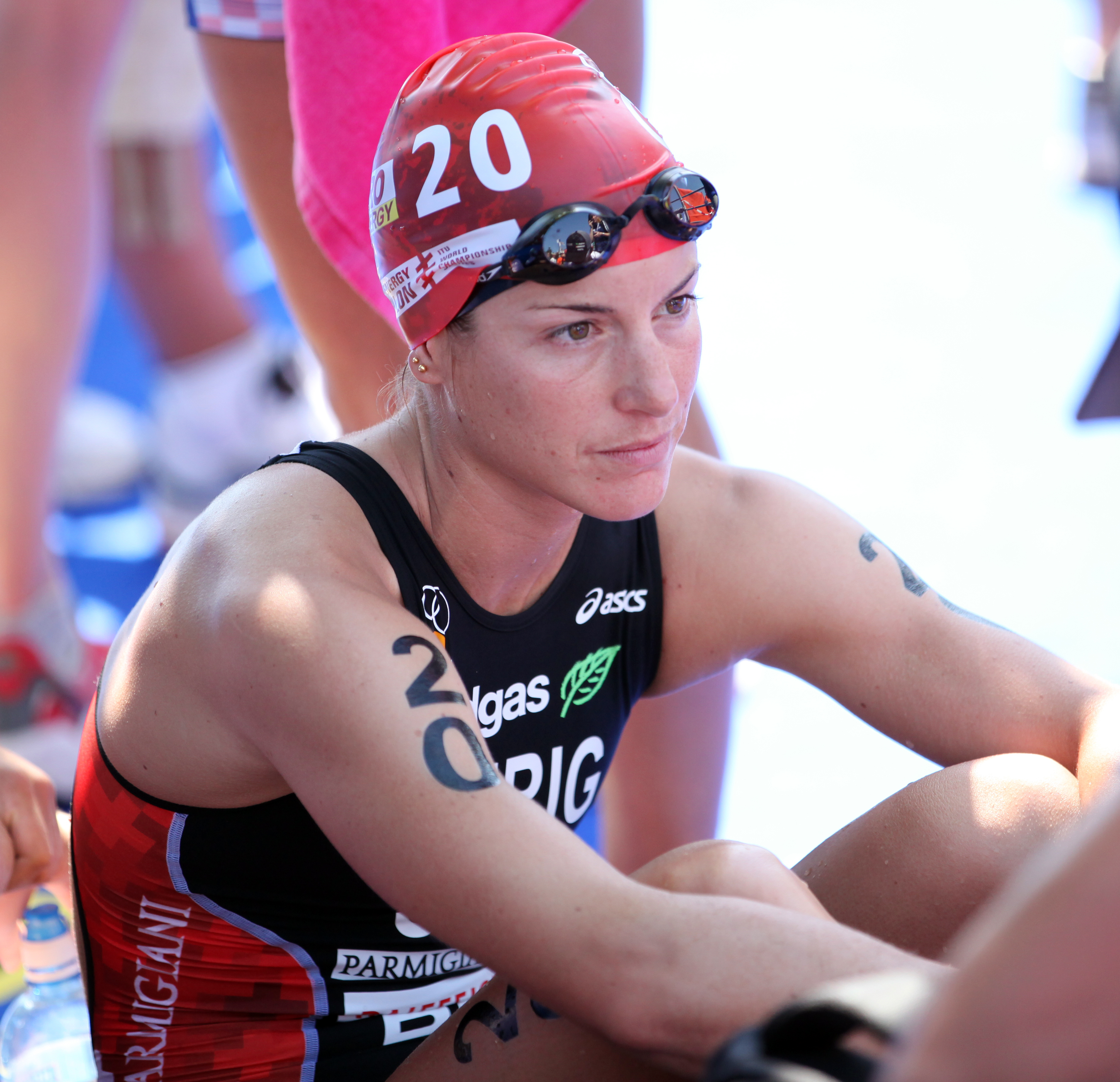
- Nicola Spirig at the Sprint World Championships in Lausanne, 2011

Personal information
- Nickname: Nic
- Born: 7 February 1982 (age 44) Winkel, Switzerland
- Education: University of Zurich
- Spouse: Reto Hug

Sport
- Sport: Triathlon, long-distance running
- Coached by: Brett Sutton (2006- )
Medal record
Representing Switzerland
Women's triathlon
Olympic Games
Gold medal – first place	2012 London	Individual
Silver medal – second place	2016 Rio de Janeiro	Individual
ITU Team Triathlon World Championships
Silver medal – second place	2011 Lausanne	Team
European Games
Gold medal – first place	2015 Baku	Individual
European Championships
Gold medal – first place	2009 Holten	Individual
Gold medal – first place	2010 Atholne	Individual
Gold medal – first place	2012 Eilat	Individual
Gold medal – first place	2014 Kitzbuehel	Individual
Gold medal – first place	2015 Genf	Individual
Gold medal – first place	2018 Glasgow	Individual
Bronze medal – third place	2007 Kopenhagen	Individual
- Updated on 9 August 2018

Nicola Spirig Hug (born 7 February 1982) is a Swiss lawyer and former professional triathlete. She is the 2012 Olympic and six times European champion in women's triathlon.

== Career ==
Nicola Spirig is a five times Olympian. She was Olympic champion in 2012 and runner up in 2016. She was World Championship runner up in 2010, Junior World Champion in 2001, Junior European Champion in 1999, and Elite European Champion in 2009, 2010, 2012, 2014, 2015 and 2018. She was the second oldest competitor in the field when she won the 2018 European Championships in Glasgow.

Spirig was born in Winkel. On 4 August 2012, Spirig won Gold in the Olympic Women's Triathlon, winning a close race in a photo finish with Sweden's Lisa Nordén.

In the 13 years from 1998 to 2010, Spirig took part in 72 ITU competitions and achieved 39 top ten positions. In 2010, she won the European Championships and the World Championship Series triathlon in Madrid, and the silver medal at the World Championship Series triathlon in London. In the overall World Championship Series ranking she place second.

Spirig has also competed as a long-distance runner, finishing second at the Swiss Cross-Country Championships in 2014 and competing at the 2014 Neujahrsmarathon Zürich. She subsequently competed in the marathon at the 2014 European Athletics Championships in Zürich, where she finished 24th in a time of 2:37.12. More recently she finished second in the 10,000 metres at the Swiss National Athletics Championships in 2021. In 2015, she and heptathlete Linda Züblin competed at the St. Moritz track in a round of the Bobsleigh World Cup, racing at the invitation of Swiss pilot Beat Hefti alongside him and brakeman Alex Baumann in the four man event, with the quartet placing 27th.

In 2021, she competed in the women's event at the 2020 Summer Olympics in Tokyo, Japan. She also competed in the mixed relay event.

== Personal life ==
Nicola Spirig lives in Bachenbülach and holds a degree in law (lic.iur.). Both her elder sister and her elder brother were competing in different sports for fun before they started their academic careers. Their parents are teachers of physical education. Spirig is married to former Swiss triathlete Reto Hug. They have a son, born 2013 and a daughter, born 2017. When 2012 Olympic champion Nicola Spirig had her first child, she was not sure whether she would ever return to triathlon. But just 12 weeks after her third child was born in April 2019, the 37-year-old was back competing in the World Triathlon Series Grand Final held in Lausanne, Switzerland between 30 August 2019 to 1 September 2019.

== ITU competitions ==
The following lists are based upon the official ITU rankings and the athlete's Profile Page. Unless indicated otherwise, the following events are triathlons and belong to the Elite category.

=== Olympics ===
Date	Competition	Place	Rank
2004-08-25	Summer Olympics	Athens, Greece	19
2008-08-18	Summer Olympics	Beijing, China	6
2012-08-04	Summer Olympics	London, United Kingdom	1st place, gold medalist(s)
2016-08-20	Summer Olympics	Rio de Janeiro, Brazil	2nd place, silver medalist(s)
2021-07-26	Summer Olympics	Tokyo, Japan	6

=== World Championships ===
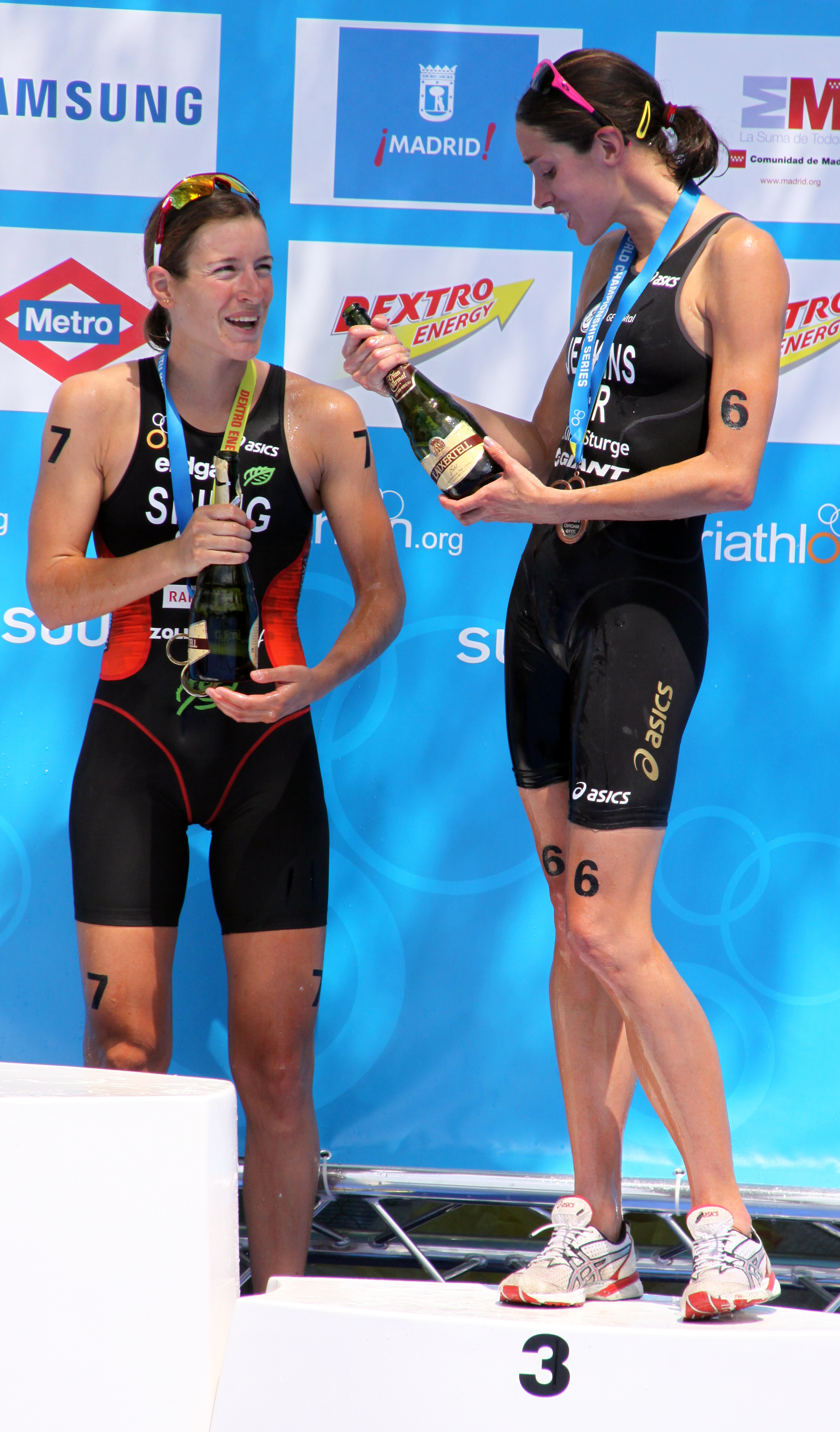
Nicola Spirig and Helen Jenkins at the World Championship Series triathlon in Madrid, 2010.

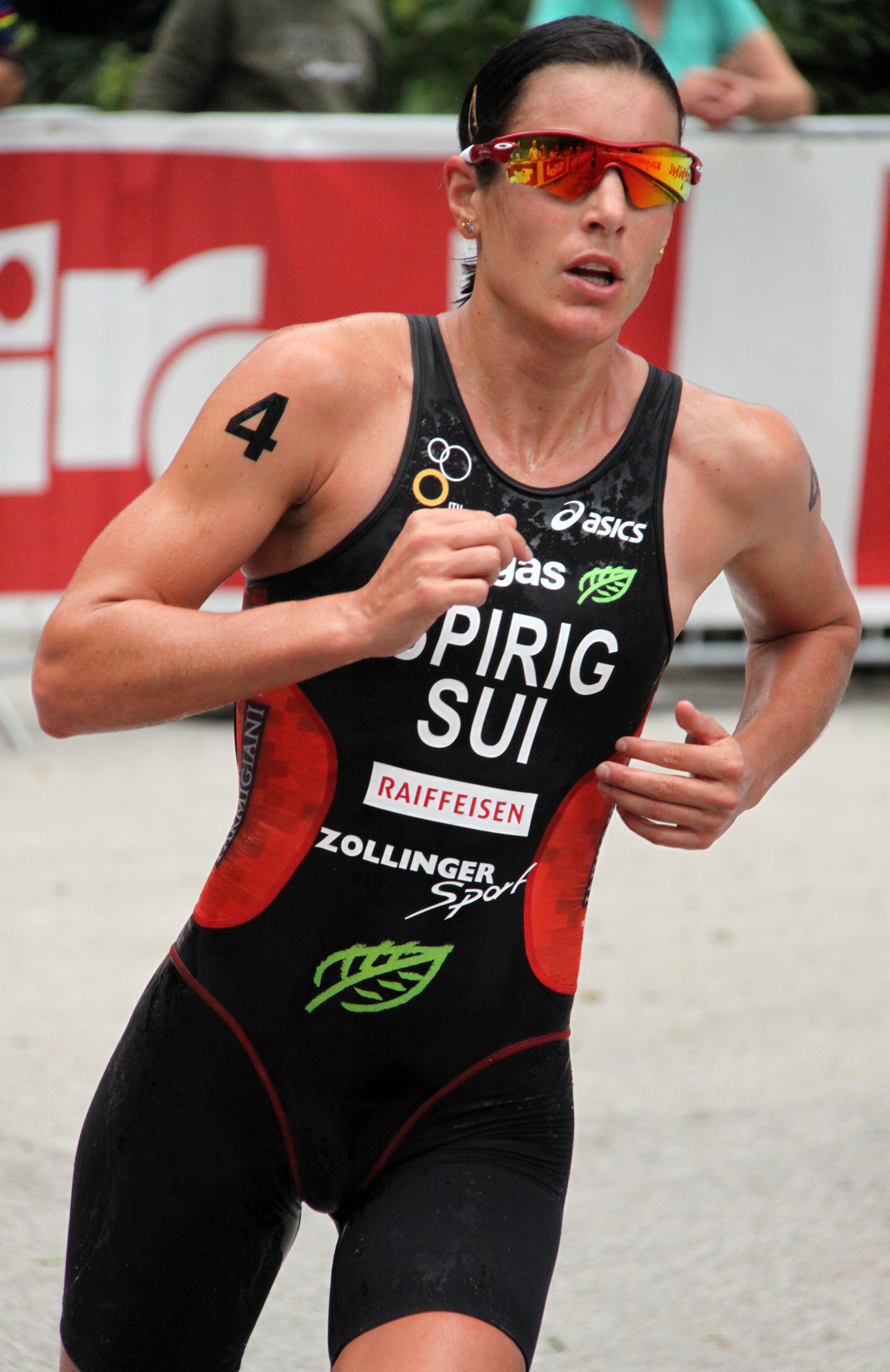
Nicola Spirig at the World Championship Series triathlon in Kitzbühel, 2010

Date	Competition	Place	Rank
2012-06-23	World Triathlon	Kitzbühel, Austria	1st place, gold medalist(s)
2012-05-26	World Triathlon	Madrid, Spain	1st place, gold medalist(s)
2012-04-14	Dextro Energy World Championships Series	Sydney, Australia	5
2011-08-21	Team World Championships	Lausanne, Switzerland	2nd place, silver medalist(s)
2011-08-20	Dextro Energy World Championship Series: Sprint World Championship	Lausanne, Switzerland	16
2011-08-06	Dextro Energy World Championship Series	London, United Kingdom	8
2011-07-16	Dextro Energy World Championship Series	Hamburg, Germany	12
2010-09-08	Dextro Energy World Championship Series, Grand Final	Budapest, Hungary	3rd place, bronze medalist(s)
2010-08-21	World Championships (Sprint)	Lausanne, Switzerland	6
2010-08-14	Dextro Energy World Championship Series	Kitzbühel, Austria	18
2010-07-24	Dextro Energy World Championship Series	London, United Kingdom	2nd place, silver medalist(s)
2010-06-05	Dextro Energy World Championship Series	Madrid, Spain	1st place, gold medalist(s)
2010-05-08	Dextro Energy World Championship Series	Seoul, South Korea	4
2009-08-22	Dextro Energy World Championship Series	Yokohama, Japan	10
2009-08-15	Dextro Energy World Championship Series	London, United Kingdom	1st place, gold medalist(s)
2009-07-11	Dextro Energy World Championship Series	Kitzbühel, Austria	2nd place, silver medalist(s)
2007-08-30	BG World Championships	Hamburg, Germany	19
2005-09-10	World Championships (U23)	Gamagori, Japan	3rd place, bronze medalist(s)
2004-05-09	World Championships	Madeira	DNF
2003-12-06	World Championships	Queenstown, New Zealand	33
2002-11-09	World Championships (U23)	Cancún, Mexico	3rd place, bronze medalist(s)

=== World Cups ===
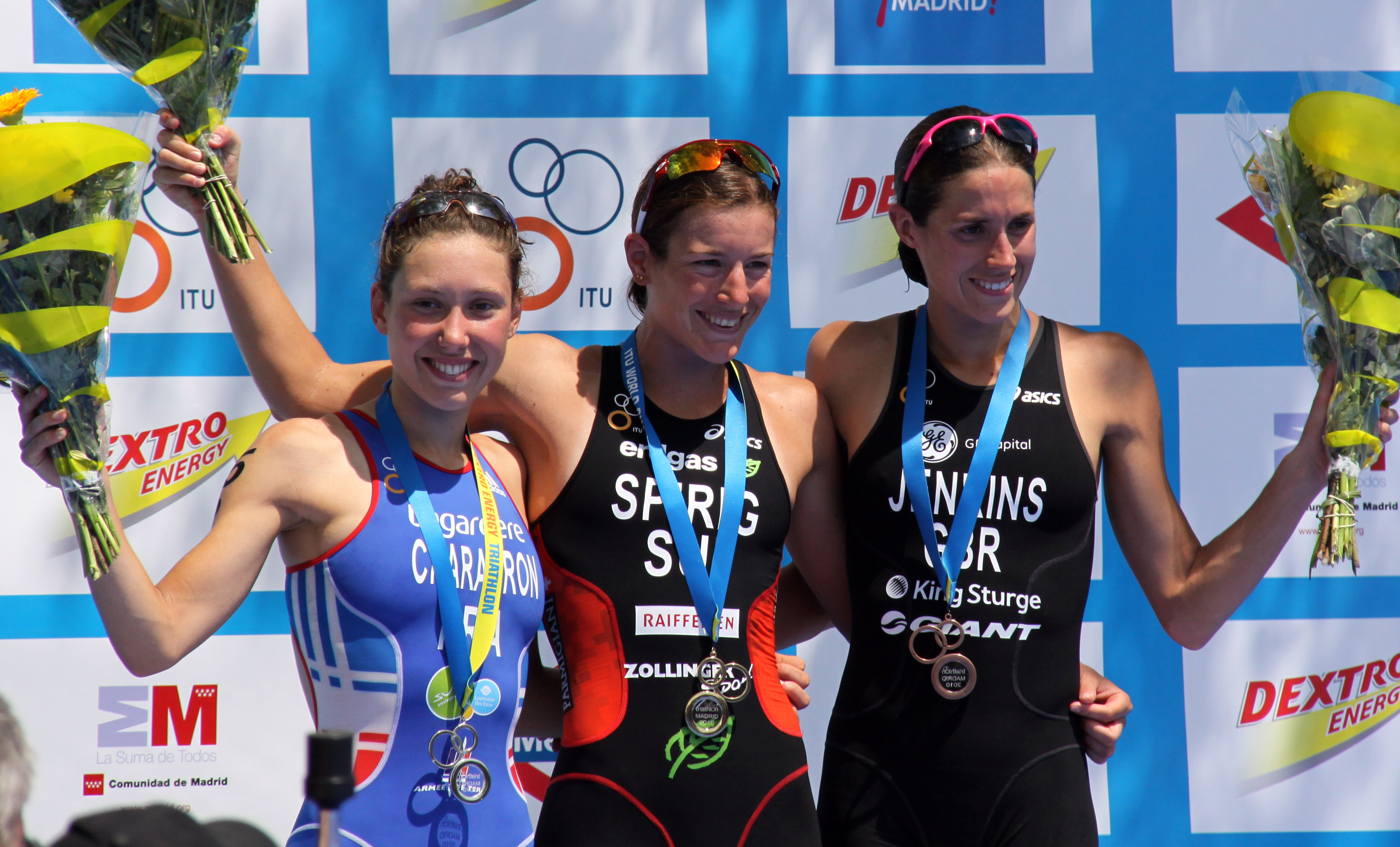
Gold medalist Spirig with Emmie Charayron and Helen Jenkins at the World Championship Series triathlon in Madrid, 2010.

Date	Competition	Place	Rank
2012-03-25	World Cup	Mooloolaba, Australia	2nd place, silver medalist(s)
2010-10-10	World Cup	Huatulco, Mexico	2nd place, silver medalist(s)
2008-09-27	BG World Cup	Lorient, France	8
2008-07-20	BG World Cup	Kitzbühel, Austria	1st place, gold medalist(s)
2008-04-26	BG World Cup	Tongyeong, South Korea	8
2008-04-13	BG World Cup	Ishigaki, Japan	6
2007-12-01	BG World Cup	Eilat, Israel	1st place, gold medalist(s)
2007-10-07	BG World Cup	Rhodes, Greece	6
2007-09-15	BG World Cup	Beijing, China	7
2007-07-29	BG World Cup	Salford, United Kingdom	10
2007-07-22	BG World Cup	Kitzbühel, Austria	6
2007-05-13	BG World Cup	Richards Bay, South Africa	5
2007-05-06	BG World Cup	Lisbon, Portugal	8
2007-04-15	BG World Cup	Ishigaki, Japan	6
2007-03-25	BG World Cup	Mooloolaba, Australia	17
2006-11-12	BG World Cup	New Plymouth, New Zealand	12
2006-11-05	BG World Cup	Cancún, Mexico	17
2006-07-23	BG World Cup	Corner Brook, Canada	DNS
2006-06-11	BG World Cup	Richards Bay, South Africa	8
2006-06-04	BG World Cup	Madrid, Spain	17
2005-09-17	OSIM World Cup	Beijing, China	32
2005-08-06	World Cup	Hamburg, Germany	DNF
2005-07-31	World Cup	Salford, United Kingdom	12
2005-06-05	World Cup	Madrid, Spain	11
2004-07-25	World Cup	Salford, United Kingdom	13
2004-04-25	World Cup	Mazatlán, Mexico	11
2004-04-11	World Cup	Ishigaki, Japan	14
2003-10-25	World Cup	Athens, Greece	24
2003-10-19	World Cup	Madeira, Portugal	17
2003-09-21	World Cup	Madrid, Spain	DNF
2003-09-06	World Cup	Hamburg, Germany	15
2003-07-20	World Cup	Corner Brook, Canada	11
2003-07-13	World Cup	Edmonton, Canada	19
2003-06-07	World Cup	Tongyeong, South Korea	26
2002-10-13	World Cup	Madeira, Portugal	20
2002-09-21	World Cup	Nice, France	21
2002-08-31	World Cup	Lausanne, Switzerland	15
2002-07-21	World Cup	Corner Brook, Canada	9
2001-08-25	World Cup	Lausanne, Switzerland	9

=== European Championships ===
Date	Competition	Place	Rank
2018-08-09	European Championships	Glasgow, United Kingdom	1st place, gold medalist(s)
2014-06-20	European Championships	Kitzbühel, Austria	1st place, gold medalist(s)
2012-04-20	European Championships	Eilat, Israel	1st place, gold medalist(s)
2010-07-03	European Championships	Athlone, Ireland	1st place, gold medalist(s)
2009-07-02	European Championships	Holten, Netherlands	1st place, gold medalist(s)
2008-05-10	European Championships	Lisbon, Portugal	4
2007-06-29	European Championships	Copenhagen, Denmark	3rd place, bronze medalist(s)
2006-06-23	European Championships	Autun, France	13
2005-08-20	European Championships	Lausanne, Switzerland	12
2005-07-17	European Championships (U23)	Sofia, Bulgaria	2nd place, silver medalist(s)
2004-04-18	European Championships	Valencia, Spain	14
2003-06-21	European Championships	Karlovy Vary, Czech Republic	12
2002-07-06	European Championships	Győr, Hungary	14

=== European Games ===
Date	Competition	Place	Rank
2015-06-13	1st European Games	Baku, Azerbaijan	1st place, gold medalist(s)

=== European Cups ===
Date	Competition	Place	Rank
2007-08-19	European Cup	Geneva, Switzerland	2nd place, silver medalist(s)
2002-06-08	European Cup	Belgrade, Serbia	3rd place, bronze medalist(s)

=== Junior results ===
Date	Competition	Place	Rank
2001-07-22	World Championships	Edmonton, Canada	1st place, gold medalist(s)
2001-06-23	European Championships	Karlovy Vary, Czech Republic	2nd place, silver medalist(s)
2000-07-08	European Championships	Stein, Netherlands	5
2000-04-30	World Championships	Perth, Australia	3rd place, bronze medalist(s)
1999-07-03	European Championships	Funchal, Portugal	1st place, gold medalist(s)
1998-08-30	World Championships	Lausanne, Switzerland	5
1998-07-04	European Championships	Velden am Wörther See, Austria	18

== Awards ==
- 2000 Best Swiss Junior Sportswoman award
- 2001 Swiss Newcomer of the Year
- 2012 Swiss Sports Personality of the Year
- 2015 European Triathlon Union Female Athlete of the Year

Awards and achievements
Preceded by Sarah Meier	Swiss Sportswoman of the Year; 2012	Succeeded by Giulia Steingruber
