= Vouliagmeni Olympic Centre =

Sports venue in Athens, Greece

Coordinates: 37.8190°N 23.7744°E

The Vouliagmeni Olympic Centre was the site of the men's and women's triathlon at the 2004 Summer Olympics at Athens, Greece. It also hosted the individual time trial cycling events. Located in Vouliagmeni, south Athens, the temporary facility seated up to 3,600, though only 2,200 seats were publicly available for the event.
