= Jan Frodeno =

German triathlete

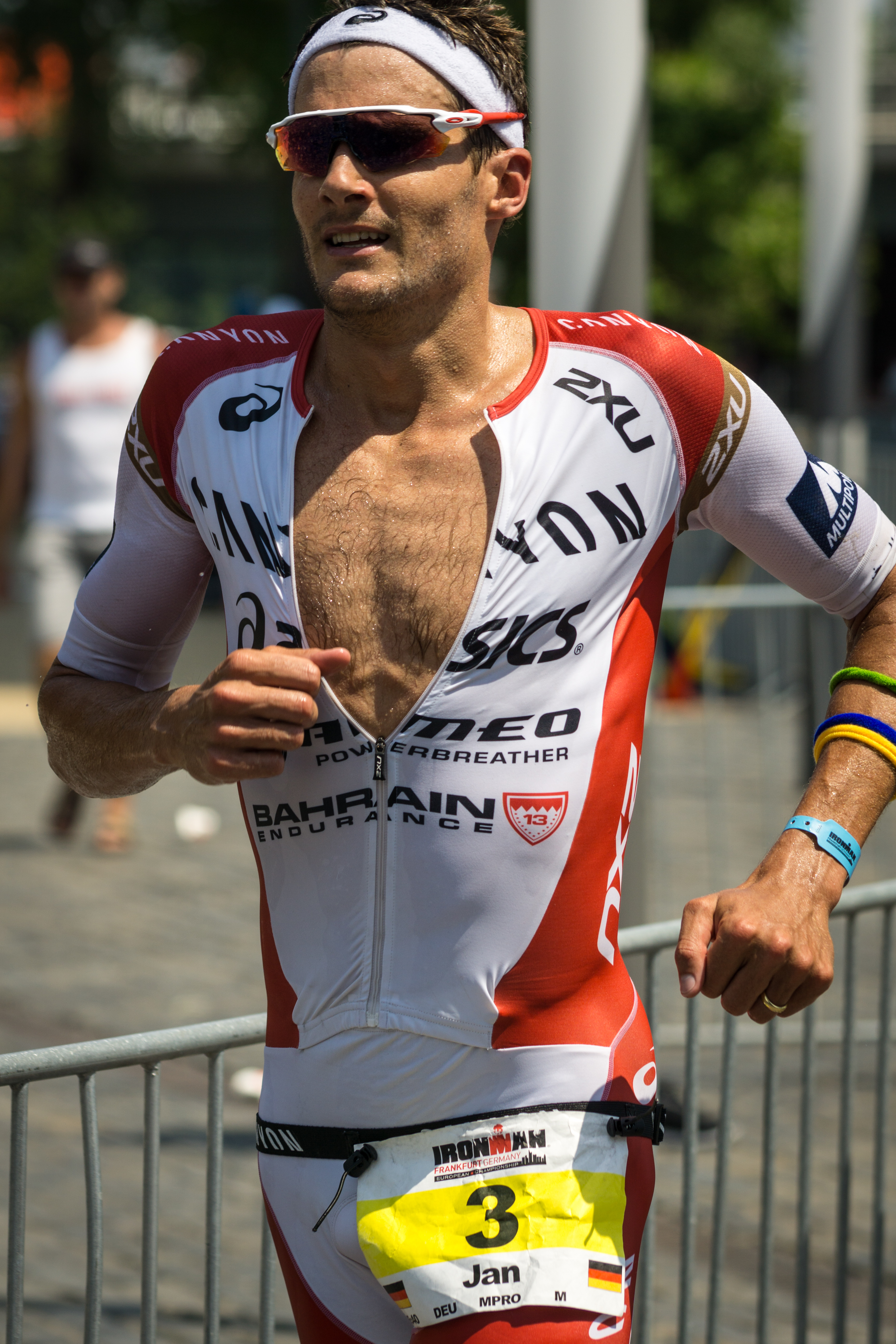
- Jan Frodeno at the 2015 Ironman Germany in Frankfurt am Main.

Personal information
- Nickname: Frodo
- Born: 18 August 1981 (age 45) Cologne, West Germany
- Height: 1.94 m (6 ft 4 in)
- Weight: 76 kg (168 lb)
- Other interests: Beach Volleyball, Surfing, Cooking, Coffee

Sport
- Country: Germany
- Club: Tri-Sport Saar-Hochwald e. V.
- Team: Bahrain Elite Endurance Team
- Coached by: Dan Lorang
Medal record
Men's triathlon
Representing Germany
Olympic Games
Gold medal – first place	2008 Beijing	Men's race
Ironman World Championship
Gold medal – first place	2019	Individual
Gold medal – first place	2016	Individual
Gold medal – first place	2015	Individual
Bronze medal – third place	2014	Individual
Ironman 70.3 World Championship
Gold medal – first place	2018 Nelson Mandela Bay	Individual
Gold medal – first place	2015 Zell am See	Individual
Silver medal – second place	2014 Mont-Tremblant	Individual
ITU Mixed Relay World Championships
Gold medal – first place	2013 Hamburg	Mixed team relay

Jan Frodeno (German pronunciation: [jan fʁoˈdeːno]; born 18 August 1981) is a German former triathlete who is the gold medal winner in men's triathlon at the 2008 Summer Olympics in Beijing, 3-time winner of the Ironman World Championship in 2015, 2016, and 2019, and 2-time winner of the Ironman 70.3 World Championship in 2015 and 2018. He had set the world record for the long distance in Roth, Germany in 2016 with 7:35:39 hours. In 2021, he broke his own world record during the Tributtle in Allgäu, Germany against Lionel Sanders, with a time of 07:27:53, setting a new world best for the long-distance triathlon.

== Athletic career ==
Born in Cologne, Frodeno started out as a swimmer in South Africa at the age of 15, and he entered triathlon in 2000. He then went to Germany to compete in the Triathlon-Bundesliga, and qualified for the national team in 2002. As part of the national team he trained at the Olympic Training Centre in Saarbrücken. Before his Olympic victory, his best result was placing sixth in the 2007 World Championships, and winning the German Championship the same year. He had previously also placed second and third in various races of the World Cup from 2005 to 2008.

Frodeno's gold medal win at the 2008 Summer Olympics was a surprise. He beat the 2000 Olympic champion Simon Whitfield in a sprint finish, while the hot pre-race favorite and 2008 World Champion Javier Gómez finished in fourth place. The victory came the day after his twenty-seventh birthday. Frodeno continued to perform strongly in 2009 and 2010, finishing 4th overall in the World Championship Triathlon Series both years. He was on course to become World Champion in 2010, needing only a 4th place in the Series Grand Final in Budapest, but due to an injury struggled to a 41st-place finish, losing the Overall title to Javier Gómez.

Frodeno returned to the Olympics in 2012 to compete in the men's triathlon event where he would finish 6th. The next year, in 2013, he retired from the shorter standard and sprint triathlon after winning a gold medal as part of the German team in the mixed relay triathlon world championships in Hamburg. He subsequently switched to longer distance endurance triathlons, finishing second at the 2013 Ironman 70.3 European Championships in Wiesbaden and scoring his first Ironman 70.3 win at the 2014 Asia-Pacific Championship in Auckland. In 2008 he said the long-distance triathlons usually are for people who failed to thrive on the shorter distances. He finished third on his full-length Ironman debut at the Ironman European Championship and also finished third at the 2014 Ironman World Championship on his World Championship debut.

In 2015 Frodeno suffered a cycling injury that took him out of the inaugural Challenge Dubai. Instead he made his season debut at Ironman 70.3 Oceanside, winning the event while edging out Andy Potts and Lionel Sanders. Following Oceanside, Frodeno took 2nd at Cannes Triathlon and 1st at Ironman 70.3 Barcelona. He went on to win the Ironman European Championship on home soil in Frankfurt, winning with a lead of over ten minutes and breaking the course record by over five minutes. He won the 2015 Ironman 70.3 World Championship defeating Sebastian Kienle and the defending champion Javier Gómez.

On October 10, 2015, he made history, becoming the first triathlete, male or female, to win both the Olympic Triathlon Gold and the Ironman World Championship title. He won over a field that included defending champion Kienle, 2013 champion Frederik Van Lierde, Andy Potts, and Andreas Raelert. He began with a strong swim where he exited and transitioned onto the bike along with Potts and Dylan McNeice at the front, pulling away from the other leaders on the bike, and completing with one of the fastest marathon runs of the day.

On July 17, 2016, in Roth Germany, he improved the world record for the long distance by more than 5 minutes to 7:35:39 hours. The previous record was held by Andreas Raelert. His split times were 45:22 minutes swim, 4:09:22 hours bike and 2:40:35 hours for the marathon. Joe Skipper of Great Britain finished second place with a time of 7:56:23 hours.

He won his second Ironman World Championship in October 2016, pulling away from 2014 champion and countryman Sebastian Kienle early on the run. Like in his 2015 victory he did not produce the races fastest split in any portion of the race but was very solid throughout. With Patrick Lange taking 3rd place, it was the first sweep by a country since 1997, when Germany also managed the feat with Thomas Hellriegel, Jürgen Zäck, and Lothar Leder.

He won his second Ironman 70.3 World Championship in September 2018, defeating his fellow Olympic champion Alistair Brownlee and defending champion Javier Gomez. However shortly after this victory he suffered a sacral fracture in his lower back as he was travelling home. This injury ruled him out of competition for the remainder of the year.

His third Ironman World Championship win in 2019 came 13 months after the back injury that ended his hopes of starting at the 2018 World Championship. He broke the course record- previously held by Patrick Lange- by 1 minute and 26 seconds, finishing in a time of 7:51:13, becoming the third triathlete to complete the World Championship in under 8 hours. His fellow countryman Sebastian Kienle finished in third, while Americans Tim O’Donnell and Ben Hoffman finished in second and fourth places, respectively.

On July 18, 2021, he set a time of 7:27:53 hours on a long distance course. His only opponent was Lionel Sanders who finished in a time of 7:43:32 hours. The duel was named Tri Battle Royale with a finish in Burgberg.

After a 20 month stretch of injury, Frodeno returned to Triathlon in 2023 to participate in various events. After initially facing difficulty to win a race he ran to an impressive win in a strong field at the PTO US Open in Milwaukee. His first and only win within PTO racing (apart from Collins Cup). Jan Frodeno finished his career at the Ironman Championships 2023 in Nice where he got 24th after a tough race. Frodeno is widely considered the G.O.A.T. of Triathlon.

== Personal ==
Frodeno is married to Emma Snowsill, the gold medalist in women's triathlon at the 2008 Summer Olympics. Frodeno is a pescatarian, having followed a vegan diet in the past.

Awards and achievements
Preceded by Robert Harting	German Sportsman of the Year; 2015	Succeeded by Fabian Hambüchen
Awards and achievements
