= Triathlon at the 2016 Summer Olympics =

Triathlon at the Games of the XXXI Olympiad
- Venue: Fort Copacabana
- Dates: 18–20 August 2016
- No. of events: 2
- Competitors: 110 from 41 nations

The triathlon competitions at the 2016 Summer Olympics in Rio de Janeiro took place from 18 to 20 August 2016 at Fort Copacabana. Fifty-five athletes competed in each of the men's and women's events.

== Format ==
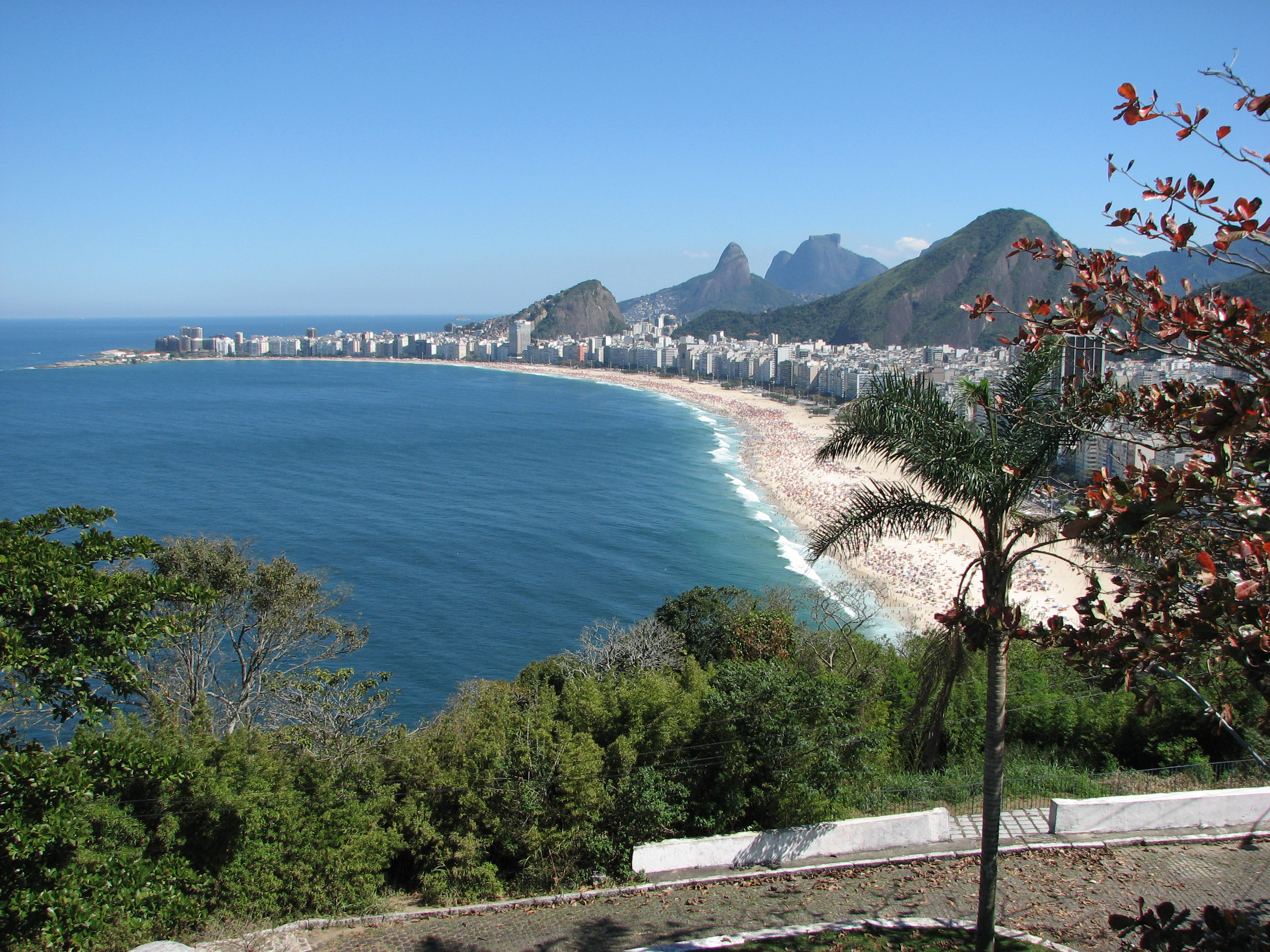
View on Copacabana

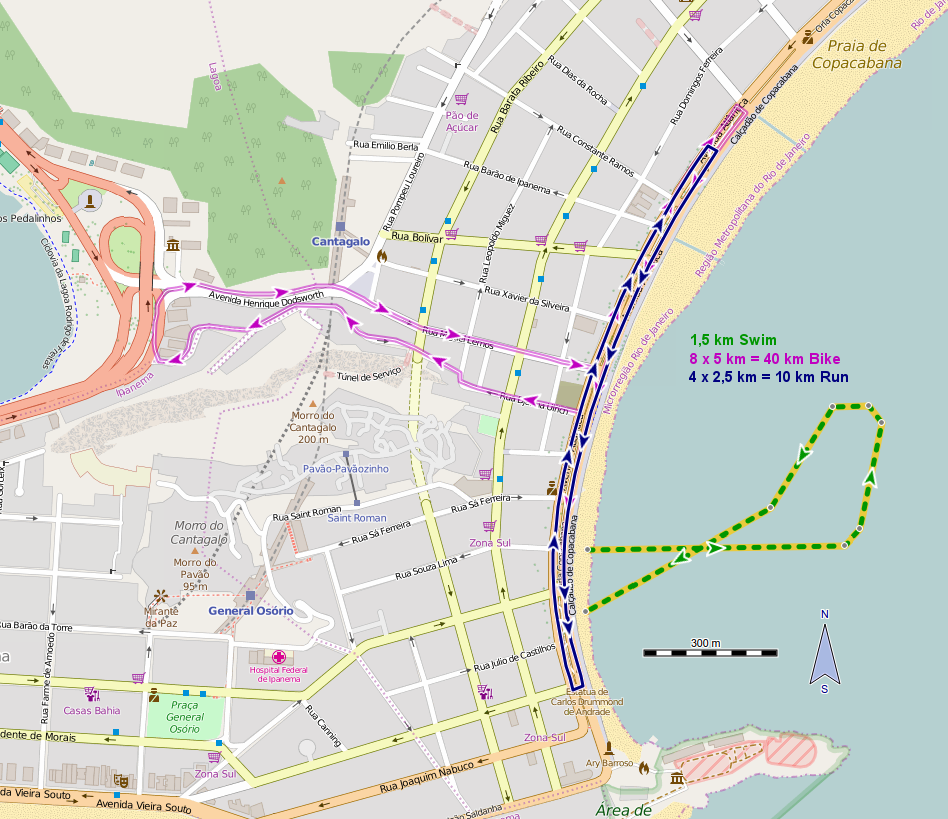
Course Map

The Olympic triathlon contained three components; a 1.5 km (0.93 mi) swim, 40 km (25 mi) cycle, and a 10 km (6.2 mi) run. The competitions took the form of a single event between all competitors with no heats.

== Qualification ==
The qualification period was from 20 May 2014 to 15 May 2016. A total of 110 athletes (55 for each gender) vied for the coveted spots with a maximum of three sent to compete for the first eight National Olympic Committees (NOCs), while the other NOCs might have a maximum of two per event. To qualify for the Games, all athletes must earn a quota place through the Continental Qualification Events, achieve a top three finish through the World Qualification Event and be among the top 140 in the Olympic Qualification List, World Triathlon Series Ranking, and Points List.

Thirty-nine athletes for each gender qualified through the ranking, next to the 5 continental champions and the top 3 in the International Qualifying Event, held in Rio de Janeiro on 1–2 August 2015. Host nation Brazil had reserved one quota per gender, while two more were allocated according to the Tripartite Commission Invitation. In the end, further five places were distributed to the NOCs without any quota through the ITU Points List.

== Schedule ==
All times are Time in Brazil (UTC-3).

Event	Date	Start time
Men's triathlon	18 August	11:00
Women's triathlon	20 August	11:00

== Participating ==
=== Participating nations ===
- Argentina (2)
- Australia (6)
- Austria (3)
- Azerbaijan (1)
- Barbados (1)
- Belgium (4)
- Bermuda (1)
- Brazil (2)
- Canada (5)
- Chile (1)
- China (2)
- Costa Rica (1)
- Czech Republic (1)
- Denmark (1)
- Ecuador (1)
- Estonia (1)
- France (5)
- Germany (5)
- Great Britain (6)
- Hungary (4)
- Ireland (2)
- Israel (1)
- Italy (4)
- Japan (4)
- Jordan (1)
- Mauritius (1)
- Mexico (5)
- Netherlands (2)
- Norway (1)
- New Zealand (4)
- Poland (1)
- Portugal (3)
- Russia (6)
- Slovakia (1)
- Slovenia (1)
- South Africa (4)
- Spain (6)
- Sweden (1)
- Switzerland (4)
- Ukraine (1)
- United States (6)

== Medal summary ==
=== Medal table ===
Rank	Nation	Gold	Silver	Bronze	Total
1	Great Britain	1	1	1	3
2	United States	1	0	0	1
3	Switzerland	0	1	0	1
4	South Africa	0	0	1	1
Totals (4 entries)		2	2	2	6

=== Events ===
Event	Gold		Silver		Bronze	
Men's individual	Alistair Brownlee; Great Britain	1:45:01	Jonathan Brownlee; Great Britain	1:45:07	Henri Schoeman; South Africa	1:45:43
Women's individual	Gwen Jorgensen; United States	1:56:16	Nicola Spirig Hug; Switzerland	1:56:56	Vicky Holland; Great Britain	1:57:01

== See also ==
- Paratriathlon at the 2016 Summer Paralympics
