= Brigitte McMahon =

Swiss triathlete (born 1967)

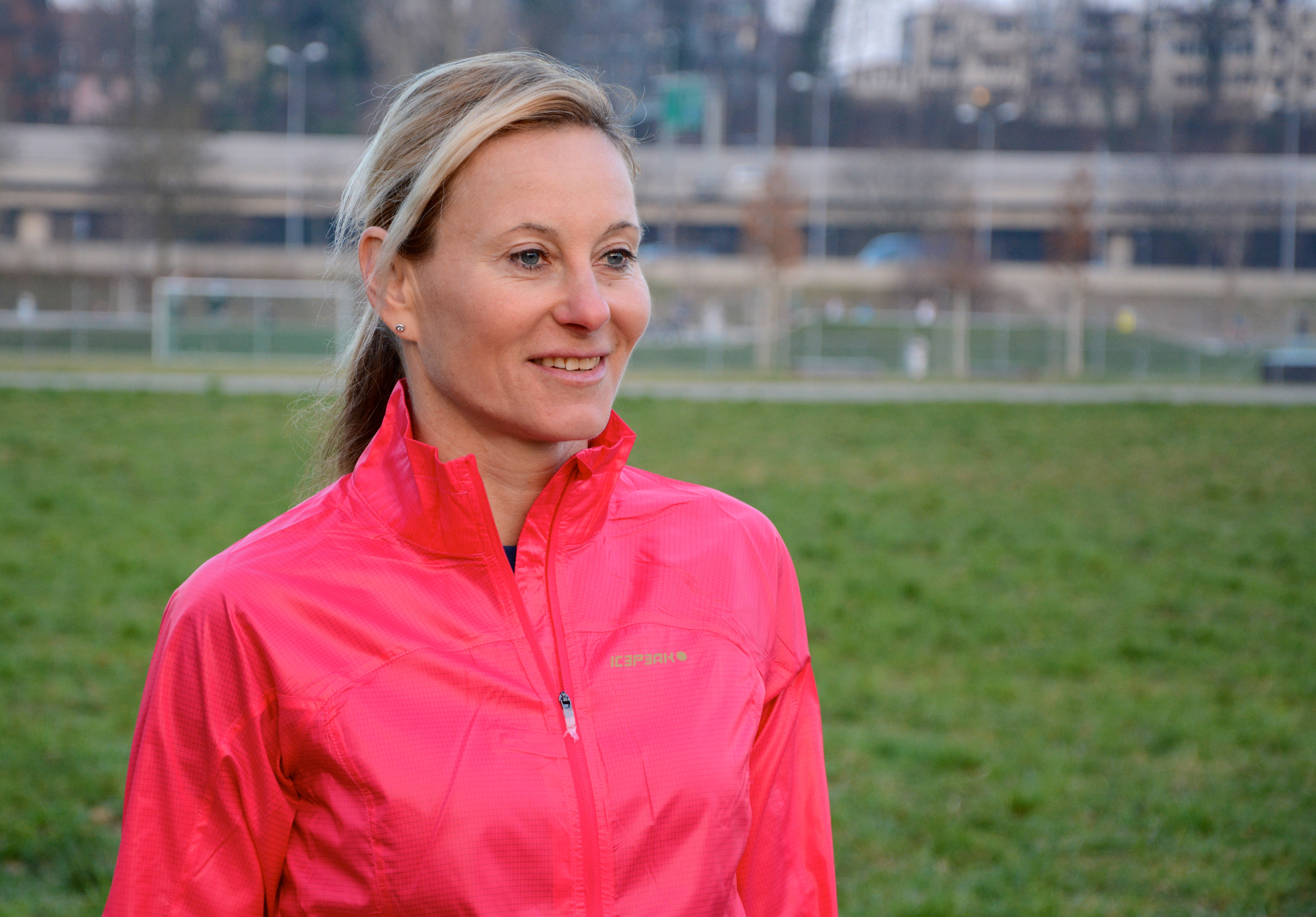

Medal record

Women's triathlon

Representing Switzerland

Olympic Games
Gold medal – first place	2000 Sydney	Individual

Brigitte McMahon-Huber (born 25 March 1967 in Baar) is an athlete from Switzerland, who competed in triathlon.

McMahon-Huber competed at the first Olympic triathlon at the 2000 Summer Olympics. She won the gold medal with a total time of 2:00:40.52, which until 2008 was the fastest time for a woman in an Olympic triathlon. Her split times were 19:44.58 for the swim, 1:05:42.30 for the cycling and 0:35:13.64 for the run.

She competed at the second Olympic triathlon at the 2004 Summer Olympics, finishing tenth with a total time of 2:07:07.73.

McMahon-Huber tested positive for erythropoietin (EPO) during an out-of-competition control in June 2005. She maintains that she did not take any doping until well after the 2004 Athens Olympics where she came 10th and that she did it for therapeutic reasons only. After the positive test she was immediately removed from the Swiss national team and was facing a two-year ban from triathlon. As a consequence she retired from the sport.

She is a teacher at Kollegi Schwyz.

== See also ==
- List of sportspeople sanctioned for doping offences

Awards
Preceded by (Switzerland) Anita Weyermann	Swiss Sportswoman of the Year; 2000	Succeeded by (Switzerland) Sonja Nef
