= Vanessa Fernandes =

Portuguese triathlete (born 1985)

GOIH, OM Vanessa Fernandes
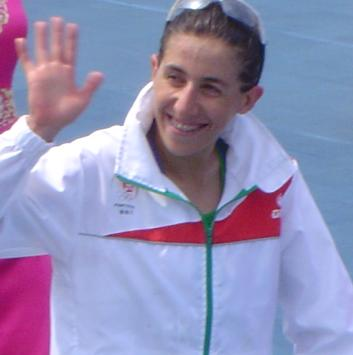
- Fernandes at the 2008 Summer Olympics

Personal information
- Full name: Vanessa de Sousa Fernandes
- Nationality: Portuguese
- Born: 14 September 1985 (age 41) Perosinho, Vila Nova de Gaia, Portugal
- Height: 169 cm (5 ft 7 in)
- Weight: 55 kg (121 lb)

Sport
- Country: Portugal
- Sport: Triathlon
- Club: Benfica
Medal record
Women's triathlon
Representing Portugal
Olympic Games
Silver medal – second place	2008 Beijing	Women's race
ITU World Championships
Gold medal – first place	2007 Hamburg	Elite women's race
Silver medal – second place	2006 Lausanne	Elite women's race
Bronze medal – third place	2003 Queenstown	Junior women's race
ITU Triathlon World Cup
Gold medal – first place	2006	Overall World Cup
Gold medal – first place	2007	Overall World Cup
European Championships
Gold medal – first place	2003 Carlsbad	Junior women's race
Gold medal – first place	2004 Tiszaújváros	U-23 women's race
Gold medal – first place	2004 Valencia	Elite women's race
Gold medal – first place	2005 Sofia	U-23 women's race
Gold medal – first place	2005 Lausanne	Elite women's race
Gold medal – first place	2006 Rijeka	U-23 women's race
Gold medal – first place	2006 Autun	Elite women's race
Gold medal – first place	2007 Copenhagen	Elite women's race
Gold medal – first place	2008 Lisbon	Elite women's race
Gold medal – first place	2008 Pulpi	U-23 women's race
Bronze medal – third place	2002 Győr	Junior women's race
Women's duathlon
ITU Duathlon World Championships
Gold medal – first place	2007 Győr	Elite women's race
Gold medal – first place	2008 Rimini	Elite women's race
ETU Duathlon European Championships
Gold medal – first place	2006 Rimini	Elite women's race
Bronze medal – third place	2002 Zeitz	Junior women's race

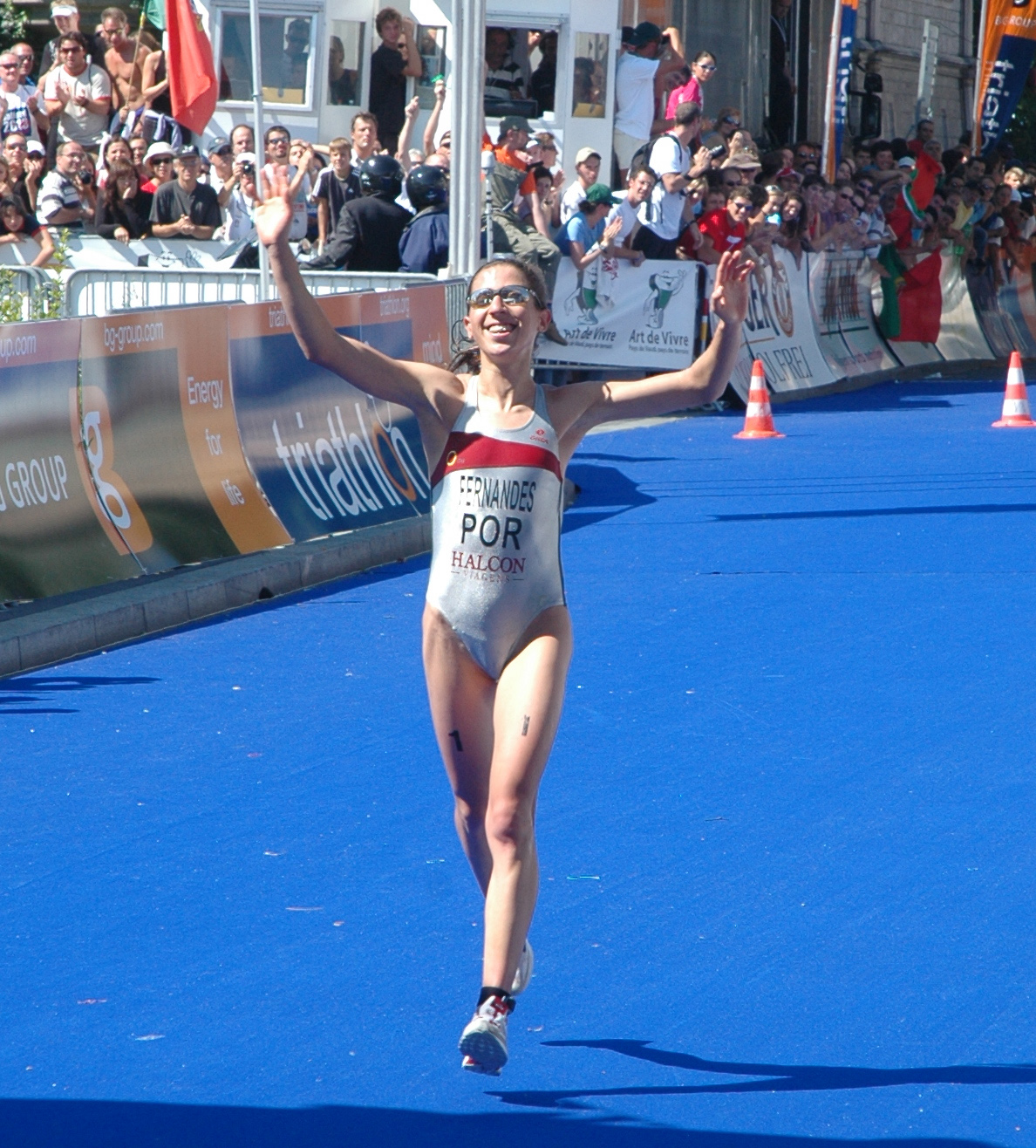
Fernandes finishing second in Lausanne 2006

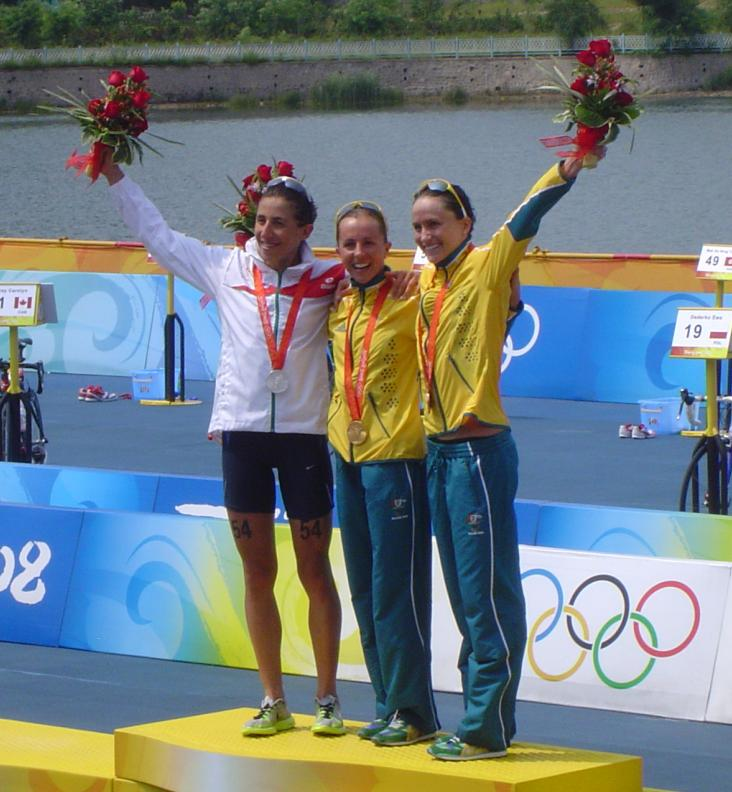
Fernandes (left), silver medalist at the 2008 Summer Olympics

Vanessa de Sousa Fernandes GOIH ComM OM (Portuguese pronunciation: [vɐˈnɛsɐ fɨɾˈnɐ̃dɨʃ]; born 14 September 1985) is a Portuguese athlete who is a former triathlon European and world champion, and an Olympic medalist. In duathlon, she was also European and world champion.

Fernandes won the European Triathlon Championships five consecutive years (5 elite and 3 under-23 titles), beginning in 2004, and on 1 September 2007, she became world champion for the first time, in Hamburg, Germany, managing to grab the only title (apart from the Olympic sceptre) missing from her career. She competes for S.L. Benfica since 2005.

== Career ==
Born in Perosinho, Vila Nova de Gaia, Fernandes was introduced to triathlon in 1999, when she was fourteen, by her father, Venceslau Fernandes, a former professional cyclist and winner of the 1984 Volta a Portugal. She competed for her local triathlon club Clube de Perosinho and then for Belenenses where she became world champion of under-23. Later in 2005, Fernandes joined S.L. Benfica and represents the club to this day. Occasionally, she enters cross country events. She competed at the Olympic Games for the first time in 2004. On the second Olympic triathlon competition, at age eighteen, she finished in eighth place with a total time of 2:06:15.39.

In June 2006, Fernandes won the International Triathlon Union World Cup, ranking number one in the world. In September, she equaled Australian Emma Carney's record number of consecutive wins in the World Cup, with a twelfth victory at the Beijing leg. Later that year, she was awarded with the "Best Female Athlete of the Year" prize from CNID (Clube Nacional de Imprensa Desportiva; English: Sports Press National Club) at its annual sports gala. In 2008, she won her 5th-in-a-row Elite European Championships title, at "home", in Lisbon, Portugal.

In August 2008, she finished second in the Beijing Olympic Games, winning her first olympic medal.

After years without competing, Fernandes is training with the 2016 Summer Olympics in mind.

== Achievements ==
2001

- 18th – European Championships (Carlsbad, Czech Republic) – junior
- 2nd – European Duathlon Championships (Mafra, Portugal) – junior (team)

2002

- World Cup:
  - 34th (Tiszaújváros, Hungary)
  - 29th (Nice, France)
  - 12th (Funchal, Portugal)
- 4th – World Championships (Cancún, Mexico) – junior
- 3rd – European Championships (Győr, Hungary) – junior
- 3rd – European Duathlon Championships (Zeitz, Germany) – junior

2003

- World Cup:
  - 10th (Ishigaki, Japan)
  - 9th (St. Anthonys, United States)
  - 1st (Madrid, Spain)
  - 9th (Funchal, Portugal)
  - 1st (Cancún, Mexico)
  - 3rd (Rio de Janeiro, Brazil)
- 1st – Estoril International Triathlon (Estoril, Portugal)
- 2nd – Praia da Vitória International Triathlon (Praia da Vitória, Portugal)
- 5th – World Summer Games (Santos, Brazil)
- European Championships (Carlsbad, Czech Republic):
  - 1st – junior
  - 2nd – junior (team)
- 3rd – World Championships (Queenstown, New Zealand) – junior
- 1st – World Duathlon Championships (Affoltern, Switzerland) – junior

2004

- 1st – Portugal National Championships
- World Cup:
  - 1st (Madrid, Spain)
  - 1st (Rio de Janeiro, Brazil)
- 5th – World Championships (Funchal, Portugal)
- 8th – Olympic Games (Athens, Greece)
- 1st – European Under-23 Championships (Tiszaújváros, Hungary)
- 1st – European Championships (Valencia, Spain)

2005

- 1st – European Under-23 Championships (Sofia, Bulgaria)
- 1st – European Championships (Lausanne, Switzerland)
- 4th – World Championships (Gamagori, Japan)
- World Cup:
  - 1st (Madrid, Spain)
  - 1st (Mazatlán, Mexico)
  - 1st (Beijing, China)
  - 1st (New Plymouth, New Zealand)

2006

- World Cup:
  - 1st (Aqaba, Jordan)
  - 1st (Mazatlán, Mexico)
  - 1st (Madrid, Spain)
  - 1st (Corner Brook, Canada)
  - 1st (Hamburg, Germany)
  - 1st (Beijing, China)
- 3rd – Portugal Cross-Country Championships (Guimarães)
- 1st – Portugal Triathlon Cup (Quarteira)
- 1st – European Cup (Estoril, Portugal)
- 1st – European Championships (Autun, France)
- 1st – European Under-23 Championships (Rijeka, Croatia)
- 5th – Life Time Fitness Triathlon (Minneapolis, United States)
- 2nd – World Championships (Lausanne, Switzerland)
- 1st – European Duathlon Championships (Rimini, Italy)
- 6th – Corrida do Tejo (Lisbon, Portugal)

2007

- World Cup:
  - 3rd (Mooloolaba, Australia)
  - 1st (Ishigaki, Japan)
  - 1st (Lisbon, Portugal)
  - 1st (Madrid, Spain)
  - 1st (Salford, United Kingdom)
  - 1st (Beijing, China)
  - 1st (Rhodes, Greece)
- 1st – World Duathlon Championships (Győr, Hungary)
- 1st – European Championships (Copenhagen, Denmark)
- 1st - World Championships (Hamburg, Germany)
- 1st – Life Time Fitness Triathlon (Minneapolis, United States)

2008

- Olympic Games (Beijing, China):
  - 2nd
- World Cup:
  - 2nd (Mooloolaba, Australia)
  - 1st (Madrid, Spain)
- 1st – European Championships (Lisbon, Portugal)
- 10th – World Championships (Vancouver, British Columbia, Canada)

== Orders ==
- Grand Officer of the Order of Prince Henry
- Commander of the Order of Merit
- Officer of the Order of Merit

Awards
Preceded by Diana Gomes	Portuguese Sportswoman of the Year; 2006 – 2008	Succeeded by Michelle Larcher de Brito
