= Loretta Harrop =

Australian triathlete

Medal record

Women's triathlon

Representing Australia

Olympic Games
Silver medal – second place	2004 Athens	Individual

ITU World Championships
Gold medal – first place	1999 Montreal	Elite women's race
Silver medal – second place	2004 Madeira	Elite women's race

ITU Triathlon World Cup
Gold medal – first place	1999	Overall World Cup

Loretta "Loz" Harrop (born 17 July 1975, in Brisbane, Queensland) is an Australian triathlete.

As a teenager she attended Cavendish Road State High School along with her siblings and as of 2007 has a house named after her. Harrop house which will go by the colour red.

In 1999, Harrop won the elite-women race at the World Triathlon Championships in Montreal.That same year she also won the overall World Cup series title.

Harrop competed at the first Olympic triathlon at the 2000 Summer Olympics. She placed fifth with a total time of 2:01:42.82. Her split times were 19:37.98 for the swim, 1:05:40.70 for the cycling, and 0:36:24.14 for the run.

Four years later, Harrop competed in the 2004 Summer Olympics in Athens. She was even more successful this time, winning a silver medal with the time of 2:04:50.17. The splits for that run were 18:37.00 for the swim, 1:09:05.00 for the cycling, and 37:08.00 for the run.

Harrop retired from professional competition in 2007. She remains active in the triathlon community, coaching a high-school triathlon programme and participating in the annual Luke Harrop Memorial Triathlon. On 22 May 2012, she was inducted into the Australian Triathlon Hall of Fame for her contributions to the sport.

Harrop is married to Brad Jones who was a talented Australian rules player in the AFLQ (Queensland) competition. Her son Hayden and daughter Emerson are both professional tennis players.
