= Triathlon at the 2004 Summer Olympics =

Triathlon at the Games of the XXVIII Olympiad
- Venue: Vouliagmeni Olympic Centre
- Dates: 25–26 August 2004
- Competitors: 100 from 34 nations

At the 2004 Summer Olympics, the triathlon events were held at the Vouliagmeni Olympic Centre. Fifty triathletes contested the female event on 25 August, and the same number contested the male event on 26 August, making up a total of 100 competitors.

Each competitor starts the event with a 1500-metre open water swim course, followed by a 40 kilometre road bicycle race and finish with a 10 kilometre road run. Both leg transitions (swimming—cycling and cycling—running) are performed in a special transition area, under judge's scrutiny and the duration of the transitions is included in the final time.

A pre-Olympic test event was staged over the Olympic course in October 2003, and saw Denmark's Rasmus Henning and Australia's Michellie Jones winning the men's and women's events.

== Medalists ==
Event	Gold	Silver	Bronze
Men's individual	Hamish Carter; New Zealand	Bevan Docherty; New Zealand	Sven Riederer; Switzerland
Women's individual	Kate Allen; Austria	Loretta Harrop; Australia	Susan Williams; United States

== Schedule ==
All times are Greece Standard Time (UTC+2)

Event	Date	Start time
Women's Triathlon	25 August	10:00
Men's Triathlon	26 August	10:00

== Medal table ==
Rank	Nation	Gold	Silver	Bronze	Total
1	New Zealand	1	1	0	2
2	Austria	1	0	0	1
3	Australia	0	1	0	1
4	Switzerland	0	0	1	1
4	United States	0	0	1	1
Totals (5 entries)		2	2	2	6
