= Triathlon at the 2008 Summer Olympics =

Coordinates: 40°15′N 116°16′E

Triathlon at the Games of the XXIX Olympiad
- Venue: Triathlon Venue at the Ming Tomb Reservoir
- Dates: 18 and 19 August 2008
- Competitors: 110 from 37 nations

The Triathlon competitions at the 2008 Summer Olympics, in Beijing, were held on Monday, August 18 (women) and Tuesday, August 19 (men), on the Triathlon Venue at the Ming Tomb Reservoir in Shisanling.

Each competitor started the event with a 1,500 metres (0.93 mi) swim course, followed by a 40 kilometres (25 mi) road bicycle race and finished with a 10 kilometres (6.2 mi) road run. Both leg transitions (swimming—cycling and cycling—running) were performed on a special transition area, under judge's scrutiny. The cycling was carried out as 6 laps of 6.66 km each and the running as 4 laps of 2.5 km each.

== Medal summary ==
Event	Gold	Silver	Bronze
Men's individual	Jan Frodeno; Germany	Simon Whitfield; Canada	Bevan Docherty; New Zealand
Women's individual	Emma Snowsill; Australia	Vanessa Fernandes; Portugal	Emma Moffatt; Australia

== Schedule ==
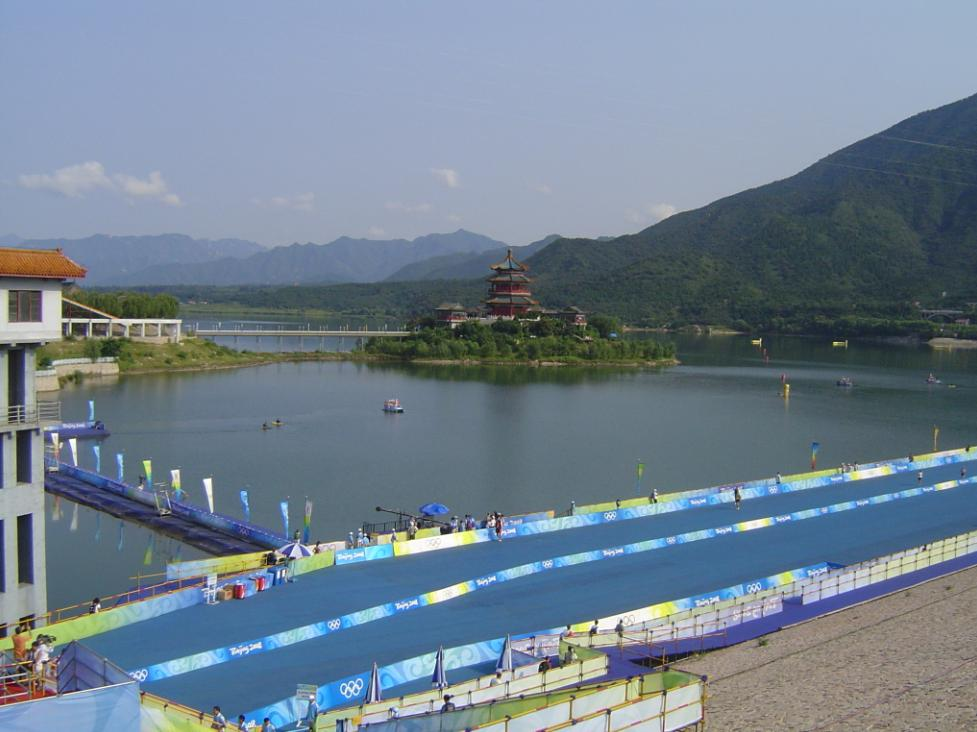
The Triathlon Venue at the Ming Tomb Reservoir.

All times are China Standard Time (UTC+8)

Event	Date	Start time
Women's Triathlon	August 18	10:00
Men's Triathlon	August 19	10:00

== Participating nations ==
A total of 110 triathletes (55 men and 55 women) from 37 nations (men from 31 nations - women from 30 nations) competed at the Beijing Games:

- Australia (5) (men:2 women:3)
- Austria (4) (men:1 women:3)
- Belgium (2) (men:2 women:0)
- Bermuda (1) (men:0 women:1)
- Brazil (3) (men:2 women:1)
- Canada (6) (men:3 women:3)
- Chile (1) (men:0 women:1)
- China (3) (men:1 women:2)
- Czech Republic (3) (men:1 women:2)
- Denmark (1) (men:1 women:0)
- Estonia (1) (men:1 women:0)
- France (5) (men:3 women:2)
- Germany (6) (men:3 women:3)
- Great Britain (5) (men:3 women:2)
- Greece (1) (men:0 women:1)
- Hong Kong (2) (men:1 women:1)
- Hungary (2) (men:1 women:1)
- Ireland (1) (men:0 women:1)
- Italy (4) (men:2 women:2)

- Japan (5) (men:2 women:3)
- Kazakhstan (1) (men:1 women:0)
- Luxembourg (2) (men:1 women:1)
- Mexico (2) (men:1 women:1)
- Netherlands (2) (men:1 women:1)
- New Zealand (6) (men:3 women:3)
- Poland (3) (men:1 women:2)
- Portugal (3) (men:2 women:1)
- Russia (5) (men:3 women:2)
- Slovakia (1) (men:1 women:0)
- South Africa (2) (men:0 women:2)
- Spain (4) (men:2 women:2)
- Sweden (1) (men:0 women:1)
- Switzerland (6) (men:3 women:3)
- Syria (1) (men:1 women:0)
- Ukraine (3) (men:2 women:1)
- United States (6) (men:3 women:3)
- Zimbabwe (1) (men:1 women:0)

== Medal table ==
Rank	Nation	Gold	Silver	Bronze	Total
1	Australia	1	0	1	2
2	Germany	1	0	0	1
3	Canada	0	1	0	1
3	Portugal	0	1	0	1
5	New Zealand	0	0	1	1
Totals (5 entries)		2	2	2	6

== Qualification ==
Eight National Olympic Committees could have a maximum of three eligible athletes per event, all other NOCs could have a maximum of two eligible athletes per event.

== Notes and references ==
Notes

- ^{a} China achieved qualification for the women's event through the ITU Olympic Qualification Ranking, therefore the host nation's Olympic place was given to another best placed athlete in the ITU Olympic Qualification Rankings;
- ^{b} Oceanian NOCs did not qualify any eligible male and female competitors through the Continental Olympic Ranking; the same situation was verified with African NOCs for the women's event. Thus, each of these qualification places were given to the next best placed athletes in the ITU Olympic Qualification Rankings;
- ^{c} Flora Duffy would qualify through her place in the ITU Olympic Qualification Ranking. Since she received an invitation from the tripartite commission, her slot was given to the next best placed athlete in the ITU Olympic Qualification Rankings.
