= 1993 ITU Triathlon World Cup =

Series details
- Races: 9

Men's World Cup
- 1st: Brad Beven (AUS)
- 2nd: Miles Stewart (AUS)
- 3rd: Bill Braun (USA)
- Most wins: Mike Pigg (2)

Women's World Cup
- 1st: Joanne Ritchie (CAN)
- 2nd: Carol Montgomery (CAN)
- 3rd: Michellie Jones (AUS)
- Most wins: Carol Montgomery (3)

World Triathlon Cup (formerly ITU Triathlon World Cup)
← 1992	1994 →

The 1993 ITU Triathlon World Cup was a series of triathlon races organised by the International Triathlon Union (ITU) for elite-level triathletes. There were nine races held in seven countries, all of them held over a distance of 1500 m swim, 40 km cycle, 10 km run (an Olympic-distance triathlon).

== Results ==
=== Amakusa, Japan ===
- 23 May 1993

Place	Men		Women	
Place	Name	Time	Name	Time
Gold medal	Miles Stewart (AUS)	01:48:50	Michellie Jones (AUS)	02:00:08
Silver medal	Brad Beven (AUS)	01:49:25	Rina Bradshaw (AUS)	02:01:37
Bronze medal	Rainer Müller-Hörner (GER)	01:49:54	Carol Montgomery (CAN)	02:01:48

=== Orange County, United States ===
- 6 June 1993

Place	Men		Women	
Place	Name	Time	Name	Time
Gold medal	Mike Pigg (USA)	01:46:09	Michellie Jones (AUS)	01:57:09
Silver medal	Andrew Carlson (USA)	01:47:36	Karen Smyers (USA)	01:58:22
Bronze medal	Brad Beven (AUS)	01:47:59	Joanne Ritchie (CAN)	01:59:23

=== Los Cabos, Mexico ===
- 21 June 1993

Place	Men		Women	
Place	Name	Time	Name	Time
Gold medal	Greg Welch (AUS)	01:55:20	Carol Montgomery (CAN)	02:11:51
Silver medal	Bill Braun (USA)	01:56:26	Terry Martin (USA)	02:14:27
Bronze medal	Garrett McCarthy (IRL)	01:56:59	Melissa Mantak (USA)	02:15:19

=== Embrun, France ===
- 14 August 1993

Place	Men		Women	
Place	Name	Time	Name	Time
Gold medal	Stephen Foster (AUS)	02:17:12	Jenny Rose (NZL)	02:38:32
Silver medal	Ben Bright (NZL)	02:18:18	Hannele Steyn (RSA)	02:47:20
Bronze medal	Yves Cordier (FRA)	02:19:53	Sophie Delemer (FRA)	02:47:25

=== Whistler, Canada ===
- 5 September 1993

Place	Men		Women	
Place	Name	Time	Name	Time
Gold medal	Bill Braun (USA)	01:47:36	Carol Montgomery (CAN)	01:56:00
Silver medal	Garrett McCarthy (IRL)	01:48:27	Joanne Ritchie (CAN)	01:59:22
Bronze medal	Andrew MacMartin (CAN)	01:49:26	María Luisa Martínez (MEX)	02:03:50

=== Ilhéus, Brazil ===
- 20 September 1993

Place	Men		Women	
Place	Name	Time	Name	Time
Gold medal	Oscar Galíndez (ARG)	01:50:51	María Luisa Martínez (MEX)	02:09:20
Silver medal	Alexandre Manzan (BRA)	01:52:20	Suzanna Schanardorf (BRA)	02:22:40
Bronze medal	Leandro Macedo (BRA)	01:54:32	Claudia Mattedi (BRA)	02:26:55

=== Maui, United States ===
- 25 September 1993

Place	Men		Women	
Place	Name	Time	Name	Time
Gold medal	Hamish Carter (NZL)	01:55:37	Carol Montgomery (CAN)	02:09:17
Silver medal	Bill Braun (USA)	01:59:01	Joanne Ritchie (CAN)	02:15:27
Bronze medal	Jim Riccitello (USA)	02:00:20	Hannele Steyn (RSA)	02:16:46

=== San Sebastián, Spain ===
- 3 October 1993

Place	Men		Women	
Place	Name	Time	Name	Time
Gold medal	Brad Beven (AUS)	01:49:40	Rina Bradshaw (AUS)	02:04:43
Silver medal	Wes Hobson (USA)	01:50:40	Béatrice Mouthon (FRA)	02:09:11
Bronze medal	Garrett McCarthy (IRL)	01:51:33	Catherine Davies (ESP)	02:10:45

=== St. Thomas, U.S. Virgin Islands ===
- 24 October 1993

Place	Men		Women	
Place	Name	Time	Name	Time
Gold medal	Mike Pigg (USA)	02:14:32	Karen Smyers (USA)	02:33:13
Silver medal	Jim Riccitello (USA)	02:16:33	Carol Montgomery (CAN)	02:34:26
Bronze medal	Oscar Galíndez (ARG)	02:17:55	Janet Hatfield (USA)	02:39:40

== Final ranking ==
Place	Men		Women	
Place	Name	Points	Name	Points
Gold medal	Brad Beven (AUS)	—	Joanne Ritchie (CAN)	—
Silver medal	Miles Stewart (AUS)	—	Carol Montgomery (CAN)	—
Bronze medal	Bill Braun (USA)	—	Michellie Jones (AUS)	—
4.	Wes Hobson (USA)	—	Karen Smyers (USA)	—
5.	Leandro Macedo (BRA)	—	Rina Bradshaw (AUS)	—
6.	Hamish Carter (NZL); Garrett McCarthy (IRL)	—	María Luisa Martínez (MEX)	—
7.	—	—	Hannele Steyn (RSA)	—
8.	Oscar Galíndez (ARG)	—	Jenny Rose (NZL)	—
9.	Andrew MacMartin (CAN)	—	Melissa Mantak (USA)	—
10.	Ben Bright (NZL)	—	Terry Martin (USA)	—

== See also ==
- 1993 ITU Triathlon World Championships
