= 1992 ITU Triathlon World Championships =

The 1992 ITU Triathlon World Championships were held in Huntsville, Canada on September 11 and September 12, 1992.

== Results ==
=== Professional Men's ===
Rank	Name	Swim	Bike	Run	Time
Gold medal	Simon Lessing (GBR)	17:31	59:39	31:53	01:49:03
Silver medal	Rainer Müller-Hörner (GER)	18:53	58:19	32:15	01:49:29
Bronze medal	Rob Barel (NED)	18:02	59:04	32:36	01:49:43
4	Stephen Foster (AUS)	18:54	58:08	32:59	01:50:02
5	Brad Kearns (USA)	18:57	58:02	33:12	01:50:13
6	Thomas Hellriegel (GER)	19:05	57:54	33:18	01:50:18
7	Mark Bates (CAN)	18:22	58:37	33:20	01:50:19
8	Wes Hobson (USA)	17:49	59:01	33:35	01:50:28
9	Tomáš Kočař (TCH)	17:22	59:46	33:20	01:50:29
10	Andrew MacMartin (CAN)	18:00	59:04	33:30	01:50:36
11	Gareth McCarthy (IRL)	17:23	59:00	34:20	01:50:44
12	Bernardo Zetina (MEX)	19:15	59:02	32:29	01:50:47
13	Jeff Devlin (USA)	19:03	59:22	32:24	01:50:50
14	Frank Clarke (CAN)	19:04	58:13	33:45	01:51:01
15	Didier Volckaert (BEL)	18:36	58:27	34:06	01:51:09
16	Glenn Cook (GBR)	17:45	–	–	01:51:14
17	Leandro Macedo (BRA)	20:42	57:54	32:37	01:51:17
18	Olivier Bernhard (SUI)	19:16	59:04	33:04	01:51:23
19	Oscar Galíndez (ARG)	20:00	58:43	32:42	01:51:25
20	John Hellemans (NZL)	18:26	59:24	33:39	01:51:28
21	Philippe Methlon (FRA)	18:25	58:37	34:31	01:51:34
22	Mark Dragan (AUS)	18:51	59:04	33:57	01:51:51
23	Rick Wells (NZL)	17:06	01:00:01	34:52	01:51:59
24	Mike Pigg (USA)	17:59	59:14	34:46	01:52:00
25	Jim Riccitello (USA)	–	–	–	01:52:08
26	Shane Johnson (AUS)	18:57	59:19	33:58	01:52:15
27	Tony O'Hagan (NZL)	19:09	59:05	34:04	01:52:19
28	Helge Lorenz (AUT)	18:32	58:21	35:37	01:52:32
29	Ulrich Ghisler (DEN)	19:01	59:20	34:16	01:52:39
30	Michal Adamec (TCH)	18:48	59:28	34:33	01:52:49

=== Professional Women's ===
Rank	Name	Swim	Bike	Run	Time
Gold medal	Michellie Jones (AUS)	20:01	01:05:27	36:39	02:07:07
Silver medal	Joanne Ritchie (CAN)	19:46	01:06:12	37:22	02:03:21
Bronze medal	Melissa Mantak (USA)	21:09	01:07:05	36:12	02:04:26
4	Donna Peters (USA)	22:33	01:02:57	39:07	02:04:38
5	Joy Hansen (USA)	20:02	01:08:26	36:44	02:05:15
6	Karen Smyers (USA)	22:39	01:05:34	37:38	02:05:54
7	Fiona Dorothy Cribb (CAN)	20:09	01:07:33	38:25	02:06:08
8	Sue Schlatter (CAN)	21:23	01:06:48	38:04	02:06:16
9	Isabelle Mouthon-Michellys (FRA)	20:22	01:07:29	38:38	02:06:27
10	Jenny Rose (NZL)	19:57	01:07:37	38:58	02:06:33
11	Anette Petersen (DEN)	20:47	01:07:26	39:05	02:07:19
12	Suzanne Nielsen (DEN)	20:25	01:08:43	38:18	02:07:27
13	Jeannine De Ruysscher (BEL)	20:30	01:08:01	38:54	02:07:29
14	Mary Cook (USA)	20:45	01:07:46	38:54	02:07:30
15	Lone Larsen (DEN)	20:18	01:07:21	40:19	02:08:01
16	Sophie Delemer (FRA)	21:00	01:06:46	40:54	02:08:42
17	Annemie Suys (BEL)	20:29	01:08:01	40:29	02:09:00
18	Carolyn Hubbard (CAN)	21:57	01:09:12	38:22	02:09:30
19	Alison Hamilton (IRL)	21:49	01:09:28	38:25	02:09:43
20	Maureen Cummings (AUS)	20:29	01:11:18	38:10	02:09:58
21	Simone Mortier (GER)	23:07	01:03:21	41:35	02:10:33
22	Colleen Cannon (USA)	20:51	01:09:33	40:16	02:10:43
23	Terri Smith-Ross (CAN)	20:45	01:11:37	38:41	02:11:05
24	Marie-Josee Cossette (CAN)	19:52	01:13:24	38:26	02:11:44
25	Jill Westenra (NZL)	22:07	01:10:25	39:17	02:11:51
26	Bianka Van Woesik (AUS)	20:57	01:10:11	40:49	02:12:01
27	Ute Schäfer (GER)	21:48	01:08:59	41:16	02:12:03
28	Catherine Davies (ESP)	20:55	01:11:02	40:16	02:12:14
29	Heather Fuhr (CAN)	22:00	01:13:14	37:10	02:12:27
30	Hannele Steyn (RSA)	21:46	01:10:39	40:03	02:12:29
31	Martha Sorensen (USA)	21:59	01:10:08	40:24	02:12:31

== See also ==
- 1992 ITU Triathlon World Cup
