= 1992 ITU Triathlon World Cup =

Series details
- Races: 10

Men's World Cup
- 1st: Brad Beven (AUS); Andrew MacMartin (CAN)
- 2nd: —
- 3rd: Garrett McCarthy (IRL)
- Most wins: Andrew MacMartin (3)

Women's World Cup
- 1st: Melissa Mantak (USA)
- 2nd: Joanne Ritchie (CAN)
- 3rd: Janet Hatfield (USA)
- Most wins: Melissa Mantak (4)

World Triathlon Cup (formerly ITU Triathlon World Cup)
← 1991	1993 →

The 1992 ITU Triathlon World Cup was a series of triathlon races organised by the International Triathlon Union (ITU) for elite-level triathletes. There were ten races held in ten countries, each held over a distance of 1500 m swim, 40 km cycle, 10 km run (an Olympic-distance triathlon).

For the first only time, the series had joint winners in the men's category with Brad Beven and Andrew MacMartin sharing the honours. Melissa Mantak took the women's title alone.

== Results ==
=== San Andrés, Colombia ===
- 10 May 1992 (US$ 20,000)

Place	Men		Women	
Place	Name	Time	Name	Time
Gold medal	Brad Beven (AUS)	01:51:49	Melissa Mantak (USA)	02:06:55
Silver medal	Mark Bates (CAN)	01:53:29	Terri Smith-Ross (CAN)	02:08:04
Bronze medal	Leandro Macedo (BRA)	01:53:51	Janet Hatfield (USA)	02:09:11

=== Säter, Sweden ===
- 28 June 1992 (US$ 20,000)

Place	Men		Women	
Place	Name	Time	Name	Time
Gold medal	Andrew MacMartin (CAN)	01:54:33	Melissa Mantak (USA)	02:10:05
Silver medal	Garrett McCarthy (IRL)	01:56:17	Bianca Van Woesik (AUS)	02:11:47
Bronze medal	Brad Beven (AUS)	01:58:36	Joanne Ritchie (CAN)	02:12:20

=== Portaferry, Ireland ===
- 4 July 1992 (US$ 20,000)

Place	Men		Women	
Place	Name	Time	Name	Time
Gold medal	Brad Beven (AUS)	01:48:18	Melissa Mantak (USA)	02:04:18
Silver medal	Andrew MacMartin (CAN)	01:48:32	Terri Smith-Ross (CAN)	02:05:24
Bronze medal	Garrett McCarthy (IRL)	01:50:51	Joanne Ritchie (CAN)	02:05:31

=== Moscow, Russia ===
- 12 July 1992 (US$ 20,000)

Place	Men		Women	
Place	Name	Time	Name	Time
Gold medal	Garrett McCarthy (IRL)	01:57:21	Isabelle Mouthon (FRA)	02:12:12
Silver medal	Brad Beven (AUS)	01:58:18	Bianca Van Woesik (AUS)	02:15:28
Bronze medal	Nick Croft (AUS)	01:58:28	Carolyn Hubbard (CAN)	02:16:40

=== Embrun, France ===
- 15 August 1992 (US$ 20,000)

Place	Men		Women	
Place	Name	Time	Name	Time
Gold medal	Simon Lessing (GBR)	02:16:56	Suzanne Nielsen (DEN)	02:42:00
Silver medal	Stephen Foster (AUS)	02:21:15	Carolyn Hubbard (CAN)	02:42:32
Bronze medal	Scott Molina (USA)	02:22:16	Allison Hamilton (IRL)	02:43:32

=== Beijing, China ===
- 29 August 1992 (US$ 20,000)

Place	Men		Women	
Place	Name	Time	Name	Time
Gold medal	Jason Harper (AUS)	01:50:41	Jenny Alcorn (AUS)	02:05:45
Silver medal	Stéphan Bignet (FRA)	01:51:26	Allison Hamilton (IRL)	02:08:29
Bronze medal	Brad Kearns (USA)	01:52:46	Béatrice Mouthon (FRA)	02:09:02

=== Las Vegas, United States ===
- 26 September 1992 (US$ 20,000)

Place	Men		Women	
Place	Name	Time	Name	Time
Gold medal	Andrew Carlson (USA)	02:00:57	Joy Hansen (USA)	02:19:54
Silver medal	Brad Beven (AUS)	02:02:11	Terri Martin (USA)	02:19:59
Bronze medal	Wes Hobson (USA)	02:02:42	Karen Smyers (USA)	02:20:40

=== Monte Carlo, Monaco ===
- 25 October 1992 (US$ 32,000)

Place	Men		Women	
Place	Name	Time	Name	Time
Gold medal	Simon Lessing (GBR)	01:59:48	Melissa Mantak (USA)	02:16:49
Silver medal	Brad Beven (AUS)	02:01:49	Suzanne Nielsen (DEN)	02:19:07
Bronze medal	Wes Hobson (USA)	02:02:07	Joanne Ritchie (CAN)	02:21:00

=== Salvador, Brazil ===
- 31 October 1992 (US$ 20,000)

Place	Men		Women	
Place	Name	Time	Name	Time
Gold medal	Andrew MacMartin (CAN)	01:57:50	Sophie Delemer (FRA)	02:14:42
Silver medal	Mark Bates (CAN)	01:58:12	Janet Hatfield (USA)	02:15:21
Bronze medal	Harold Robinson (USA)	01:58:54	Carolyn Hubbard (CAN)	02:17:41

=== Ixtapa, Mexico ===
- 8 November 1992 (US$ 20,000)

Place	Men		Women	
Place	Name	Time	Name	Time
Gold medal	Andrew MacMartin (CAN)	01:55:21	Karen Smyers (USA)	02:12:51
Silver medal	Oscar Galíndez (ARG)	01:56:07	Melissa Mantak (USA)	02:12:53
Bronze medal	Harold Robinson (USA)	01:56:32	Janet Hatfield (USA)	02:13:58

== Final ranking ==
Place	Men		Women	
Place	Name	Points	Name	Points
Gold medal	Brad Beven (AUS); Andrew MacMartin (CAN)	—	Melissa Mantak (USA)	—
Silver medal	—	—	Joanne Ritchie (CAN)	—
Bronze medal	Garrett McCarthy (IRL)	—	Janet Hatfield (USA)	—
4.	Harold Robinson (USA)	—	Carolyn Hubbard (CAN)	—
5.	Mark Bates (CAN)	—	Béatrice Mouthon (FRA)	—
6.	Wes Hobson (USA)	—	Allison Hamilton (IRL)	—
7.	Simon Lessing (GBR)	—	Sophie Delemer (FRA)	—
8.	Leandro Macedo (BRA)	—	María Luisa Martínez (MEX)	—
9.	Bernardo Zetina (MEX)	—	Suzanne Nielsen (DEN)	—
10.	Oscar Galíndez (ARG)	—	Lucero Vivanco (PER)	—

== See also ==
- 1992 ITU Triathlon World Championships
