= 1993 ITU Triathlon World Championships =

The 1993 ITU Triathlon World Championships were held in Manchester, United Kingdom on 21 and 22 August 1993.

== Results ==
=== Professional Men ===
Rank	Name	Swim	Bike	Run	Time
Gold medal	Spencer Smith (GBR)	18:04	44:43	48:33	01:51:20
Silver medal	Simon Lessing (GBR)	18:05	50:49	44:08	01:53:02
Bronze medal	Hamish Carter (NZL)	18:13	44:54	50:22	01:53:29
4	Brad Beven (AUS)	18:13	46:11	49:31	01:53:55
5	Ben Bright (NZL)	18:12	53:21	42:47	01:54:20
6	Rainer Müller-Hörner (GER)	18:08	01:03:26	33:15	01:54:49
7	Ralf Eggert (GER)	18:13	01:02:17	34:24	01:54:54
8	Miles Stewart (AUS)	18:13	01:03:21	33:38	01:55:13
9	Philippe Fattori (FRA)	18:59	01:04:45	31:34	01:55:18
10	Remy Rampteau (FRA)	19:04	01:04:37	31:43	01:55:25
11	Mark Bates (CAN)	18:45	01:05:03	31:42	01:55:30
12	Jeff Devlin (USA)	19:57	01:02:51	32:40	01:55:31
13	Tomáš Kočař (CZE)	18:14	01:04:26	32:59	01:55:39
14	Andrew MacMartin (CAN)	18:59	01:04:45	32:02	01:55:46
15	Christoph Mauch (SUI)	19:53	01:02:46	33:09	01:55:48
16	Nick Radkewich (USA)	18:45	01:03:51	33:23	01:55:59
17	Bill Braun (USA)	?	?	?	01:55:59
18	Mathew Belfield (GBR)	18:22	01:03:21	34:23	01:56:07
19	Wes Hobson (USA)	18:14	01:04:18	33:37	01:56:07
20	Luc Van Lierde (BEL)	18:23	01:05:23	32:24	01:56:11
21	Richard Hobson (GBR)	18:44	01:00:58	36:38	01:56:21
22	Leandro Macedo (BRA)	18:13	01:07:05	31:09	01:56:27
23	Greg Welch (AUS)	18:12	01:05:52	32:24	01:56:28
24	Brad Kearns (USA)	19:05	01:04:36	32:49	01:56:30
25	Sylvain Dafflon (FRA)	18:07	01:05:38	32:47	01:56:33
26	Didier Volckaert (BEL)	18:48	01:03:41	34:07	01:56:36
27	Dennis Looze (NED)	18:07	01:05:35	33:02	01:56:46
28	Greg Fraiss (NZL)	19:54	01:02:46	34:12	01:56:53
29	Holger Lorenz (GER)	19:26	01:03:27	34:02	01:56:56
30	Peter Sandvang (DEN)	19:04	01:02:24	35:35	01:57:03

=== Professional Women ===
Rank	Name	Swim	Bike	Run	Time
Gold medal	Michellie Jones (AUS)	19:53	59:12	48:36	02:07:41
Silver medal	Karen Smyers (USA)	19:56	01:03:54	43:53	02:07:43
Bronze medal	Joanne Ritchie (CAN)	19:45	01:02:54	46:07	02:08:46
4	Sonja Krolik (GER)	20:53	01:11:28	36:59	02:09:21
5	Suzanne Nielsen (DEN)	20:12	01:10:25	38:47	02:09:26
6	Anette Petersen (DEN)	19:55	01:06:00	43:39	02:09:34
7	Sabine Westhoff (GER)	19:56	01:07:46	42:40	02:10:22
8	Jenny Rose (NZL)	20:18	01:11:45	00:38:25	02:10:28
9	Ute Schaefer (GER)	22:37	01:05:40	42:39	02:10:56
10	Bianca Van Woesik (AUS)	21:03	01:12:17	37:44	02:11:03
11	Sue Turner (AUS)	22:21	01:18:42	30:04	02:11:09
12	Jeannine De Ruysscher (BEL)	21:02	01:11:10	39:06	02:11:18
13	Isabelle Mouthon-Michellys (FRA)	19:54	01:12:57	38:30	02:11:20
14	Jackie Gallagher (AUS)	22:12	01:13:04	36:13	02:11:29
15	Brigitte Scheithauer (GER)	19:57	01:09:38	42:03	02:11:38
16	Lydie Reuze (FRA)	19:50	01:12:22	39:43	02:11:55
17	Joy Hansen (USA)	21:11	01:14:55	35:51	02:11:57
18	Terri Smith-Ross (CAN)	20:22	01:13:03	38:45	02:12:10
19	Simone Mortier (GER)	21:04	01:12:13	38:58	02:12:14
20	Hannele Steyn (RSA)	22:12	01:12:25	37:48	02:12:25
21	Jill Westenra (NZL)	21:42	01:11:47		02:12:38
22	Irma Heeren (NED)	23:29	01:12:43	36:37	02:12:49
23	Alison Hamilton (IRL)	22:15	01:12:29	38:14	02:12:58
24	Heather Fuhr (CAN)	22:05	01:15:11	35:45	02:13:01
25	Francisca Rüssli (SUI)	21:23	01:10:59	40:46	02:13:09
26	Terry Martin (USA)	21:49	01:13:03	38:23	02:13:14
27	Jacqueline Sommer (SUI)	20:53	01:13:17	39:08	02:13:19
28	Beatrice Mouthon (FRA)	20:30	01:13:20	39:30	02:13:20
29	Fiddy Van Pittius (RSA)	21:30	01:12:18	39:33	02:13:21
30	Janet Hatfield (USA)	20:45	01:15:37	37:37	02:13:59

== See also ==
- 1993 ITU Triathlon World Cup
