= 1991 in Canada =

- Decades: 1970s; 1980s; 1990s; 2000s; 2010s
- See also: History of Canada; Timeline of Canadian history; List of years in Canada

Events from the year 1991 in Canada.

== Incumbents ==
=== Crown ===
- Monarch – Elizabeth II

=== Federal government ===
- Governor General – Ray Hnatyshyn
- Prime Minister – Brian Mulroney
- Chief Justice – Antonio Lamer (Quebec)
- Parliament – 34th

=== Provincial governments ===
==== Lieutenant governors ====
- Lieutenant Governor of Alberta – Helen Hunley (until March 11) then Gordon Towers
- Lieutenant Governor of British Columbia – David Lam
- Lieutenant Governor of Manitoba – George Johnson
- Lieutenant Governor of New Brunswick – Gilbert Finn
- Lieutenant Governor of Newfoundland – James McGrath (until November 5) then Frederick Russell
- Lieutenant Governor of Nova Scotia – Lloyd Crouse
- Lieutenant Governor of Ontario – Lincoln Alexander (until December 11) then Hal Jackman
- Lieutenant Governor of Prince Edward Island – Marion Reid
- Lieutenant Governor of Quebec – Martial Asselin
- Lieutenant Governor of Saskatchewan – Sylvia Fedoruk

==== Premiers ====
- Premier of Alberta – Don Getty
- Premier of British Columbia – Bill Vander Zalm (until April 2) then Rita Johnston (April 2 to November 5) then Mike Harcourt
- Premier of Manitoba – Gary Filmon
- Premier of New Brunswick – Frank McKenna
- Premier of Newfoundland – Clyde Wells
- Premier of Nova Scotia – Roger Bacon (until February 26) then Donald Cameron
- Premier of Ontario – Bob Rae
- Premier of Prince Edward Island – Joe Ghiz
- Premier of Quebec – Robert Bourassa
- Premier of Saskatchewan – Grant Devine (until November 1) then Roy Romanow

=== Territorial governments ===
==== Commissioners ====
- Commissioner of Yukon – John Kenneth McKinnon
- Commissioner of Northwest Territories – Daniel L. Norris

==== Premiers ====
- Premier of the Northwest Territories – Dennis Patterson (until November 14) then Nellie Cournoyea
- Premier of Yukon – Tony Penikett

== Events ==
=== January to June ===
- January 1 – The Goods and Services Tax comes into effect.
- January 15 – Canadian Forces begin their participation in the Persian Gulf War.
- January 29 – The Allaire Committee releases its report on Canada's constitution: it recommends the transfer of many powers from the federal government to the provinces.
- January 30 – Gulf War: A Canadian CF-18 Hornet attacks and causes irreparable damage to an Iraqi warship.
- February 26 – Donald Cameron becomes premier of Nova Scotia, replacing Roger Bacon.
- February 27 – Gulf War: Iraq agrees to a cease-fire ending the conflict.
- April 2 – Rita Johnston becomes premier of British Columbia, replacing Bill Vander Zalm. She is the first woman premier in Canada.
- April 22 – Joe Clark is appointed Minister responsible for Constitutional Affairs.
- May – George Erasmus, leader of the Assembly of First Nations, resigns and is succeeded by Ovide Mercredi.
- May 14 – MP John Nunziata alleges the Royal Canadian Mounted Police (RCMP) know who bombed the Air-India flight 182 but did not have evidence needed for prosecution.
- June 11 – The Quebec sovereigntist party Bloc Québécois is founded by Lucien Bouchard.
- June 15 – Paul Bernardo kidnaps, rapes, and murders Leslie Mahaffy.
- June 19 – The Dobbie-Castonguay Commission is created to look into changes to the constitution.

=== July to December ===
- July 3 – The process leading to the privatization of Petro-Canada is started.
- July 27 – Greg Welch (AUS) and Sue Schlatter (CAN) win the 1991 ITU Triathlon World Cup race (1.5 km swim, 40 km bike, 10 km run) in Vancouver.
- August 4 – Brad Beven (AUS) and Karen Smyers (USA) win the 1991 ITU Triathlon World Cup race (1.5 km swim, 40 km bike, 10 km run) in Toronto.
- September 24 – Dobbie-Castonguay Commission recommends an elected Senate and recognizing Quebec as a distinct society.
- October 21 – The Saskatchewan election: Roy Romanow's NDP win a majority, defeating Grant Devine's PCs.
- November 1 – Roy Romanow becomes premier of Saskatchewan, replacing Grant Devine.
- November 5 – Michael Harcourt becomes premier of British Columbia, replacing Rita Johnston.
- November 14 – Nellie Cournoyea becomes government leader of the Northwest Territories, replacing Dennis Patterson, the first woman to do so, first female premier of a Canadian territory and the second female premier in Canadian history after Rita Johnston of British Columbia.
- November 24 – At the 79th Grey Cup the Toronto Argonauts defeat the Calgary Stampeders at Winnipeg Stadium in Winnipeg.
- December 7 – A Bunch of Munsch premieres on CTV, based on the children's books by Robert Munsch.

=== Full date unknown ===
- Jean-Bertrand Aristide, the President of Haiti, visits Canada and is warmly welcomed by the large Haitian community in Montreal, where he had studied at the Université de Montréal.
- Julius Alexander Isaac is named Chief Justice of the Federal Court of Canada. He becomes the first Black Chief Justice in Canada.
- David Schindler of the University of Alberta wins the first international Stockholm Water Prize for environmental research.
- Ferguson Jenkins becomes the first Canadian elected to the Baseball Hall of Fame.
- Canadian peacekeepers begin a five-year deployment to El Salvador.
- Canadian observers are sent to Western Sahara.
- News media: eye weekly created in Toronto.

== Arts and literature ==
=== New works ===
- Rohinton Mistry: Such a Long Journey
- Douglas Coupland: Generation X: Tales for an Accelerated Culture
- Margaret Atwood: Wilderness Tips
- Dave Duncan: Faery Lands Forlorn
- Hume Cronyn: A Terrible Liar
- Spider Robinson: Starseed

=== Awards ===
- See 1991 Governor General's Awards for a complete list of winners and finalists for those awards.
- Books in Canada First Novel Award: Nino Ricci, Lives of the Saints
- Gerald Lampert Award: Diana Brebner, Radiant Life Forms
- Geoffrey Bilson Award: Marianne Brandis, The Sign of the Scales
- Marian Engel Award: Joan Clark
- Pat Lowther Award: Karen Connelly, The Small Words in My Body
- Stephen Leacock Award: Howard White, Waiting in the Rain
- Trillium Book Award: Margaret Atwood, Wilderness Tips
- Vicky Metcalf Award: Brian Doyle

=== Film ===
- Atom Egoyan's The Adjuster is released
- James Cameron's Terminator 2: Judgment Day is released. It is the year's highest-grossing film

=== Music ===
- Trevor Pinnock becomes director of the National Arts Centre Orchestra

== Sport ==
- May 19 – Spokane Chiefs win their first Memorial Cup by defeating the Drummondville Voltigeurs 5 to 1. The final game was played at Colisée de Québec in Quebec City, Quebec
- May 25 – Montreal, Quebec's Mario Lemieux of the Pittsburgh Penguins is awarded the Conn Smythe Trophy
- November 24 – Toronto Argonauts win their twelfth Grey Cup by defeating the Calgary Stampeders in the 79th Grey Cup played at Winnipeg Stadium in Winnipeg. Toronto's Dave Sapunjis was awarded the game's Most Valuable Canadian in a losing effort
- November 30 – Wilfrid Laurier Golden Hawks win their first Vanier Cup by defeating the Mount Allison Mounties 25 to 18 in the 27th Vanier Cup

== Births ==
- January 13 – Kyle Clifford, ice hockey player
- January 16 – Matt Duchene, ice hockey player
- January 18 – Britt McKillip, actress and musician
- January 21 – Brittany Tiplady, actress
- January 25 – Jared Cowen, ice hockey player
- January 28 – Calum Worthy, actor
- February 12 – Ryan Kavanagh, ice hockey player
- March 10 – Landon Liboiron, actor
- March 13 – Tristan Thompson, basketball player
- March 14
  - Rhiannon Fish, actress
  - Greta Onieogou, actress
- April 7 – Michelle Monkhouse, fashion model (died 2011)
- April 19 – Kelly Olynyk, basketball player
- April 22 – Aqsa Parvez, murder victim (died 2007)
- May 8 – Ethan Gage, soccer player
- May 10 – Jordan Francis, singer, dancer, actor, and choreographer
- May 11 – Johnathon Robert Madden, murder victim (died 2003)
- May 17 - Abigail Raye, field hockey player
- May 29 – Jesse Camacho, actor
- May 31 – Pierre-Luc Dusseault, politician
- June 19 – Hilary Bell, swimmer
- June 29 – Tajja Isen, actress
- July 13 – Mackenzie Boyd-Clowes, ski jumper
- July 20 – Andrew Shaw, ice hockey player
- July 24 – Emily Bett Rickards, actress
- August 6 – Kacey Rohl, actress
- August 18 – Richard Harmon, actor
- August 20 – Cory Joseph, basketball player
- August 22 – Brayden Schenn, ice hockey player
- August 23 – Jennifer Abel, diver
- September 2 – Emma Lunder, biathlete
- September 8 – Nicole Dollanganger, singer and songwriter
- September 16 – Alexandra Paul, ice dancer (died 2023)
- October 30 – Aliza Vellani, television actress
- October 31 – Patricia Obee, rower
- November 10 – Genevieve Buechner, actress
- November 13 – Devon Bostick, actor
- November 14
  - Miriam Brouwer, cyclist
  - Taylor Hall, ice hockey player
- November 25 – Disguised Toast, Taiwanese-Canadian video game streamer, YouTuber, and Internet personality
- November 28 – Ian Beharry, pair skater
- December 12 – Daniel Magder, actor
- December 17 – Léo Bureau-Blouin, politician

== Deaths ==
=== January to June ===
- January 1 – Larry Condon, politician (born 1936)
- January 23 – Northrop Frye, literary critic and literary theorist (born 1912)
- February 7 – Jean-Paul Mousseau, artist (born 1927)
- February 11 – Pete Parker, radio announcer (born 1895)
- February 20 – Eugene Forsey, politician and constitutional expert (born 1904)
- April 26 – Richard Hatfield, politician and 26th Premier of New Brunswick (born 1931)
- May 9 – Loran Ellis Baker, politician (born 1905)
- June 11 – David Croll, politician (born 1900)
- June 16 – Leslie Mahaffy, murder victim (born 1976)

=== July to December ===
- July 8 – Gordon Stewart Anderson, writer (born 1958)
- July 10 – Grace MacInnis, politician and feminist (born 1905)
- August 6 – Roland Michener, lawyer, politician diplomat and Governor-General of Canada (born 1900)
- August 22 – Colleen Dewhurst, actress (born 1924)
- August 31 – Cliff Lumsdon, world champion marathon swimmer (born 1931)
- September 12 – Albert Bruce Matthews, commander of the 2nd Canadian Infantry Division during the Second World War (born 1909)
- September 25 – Stanley Waters, Senator (born 1920)
- October 2 – Hazen Argue, politician (born 1921)
- October 26 – Sherry Hawco, artistic gymnast (born 1964)
- November 13 – Paul-Émile Léger, Cardinal of the Roman Catholic Church (born 1904)
- December 17 – Armand Frappier, physician and microbiologist (born 1904)

== See also ==
- 1991 in Canadian television
- List of Canadian films of 1991
