= 1991 ITU Triathlon World Cup =

Series details
- Races: 11

Men's World Cup
- 1st: Leandro Macedo (BRA)
- 2nd: Greg Welch (AUS)
- 3rd: Andrew McNaughton (CAN)
- Most wins: Greg Welch and Mike Pigg (2)

Women's World Cup
- 1st: Karen Smyers (USA)
- 2nd: Terri Smith-Ross (CAN)
- 3rd: Catherine Davies (ESP)
- Most wins: Karen Smyers (4)

World Triathlon Cup (formerly ITU Triathlon World Cup)
← inaugural	1992 →

The 1991 ITU Triathlon World Cup was a series of triathlon races organised by the International Triathlon Union (ITU) for elite-level triathletes. There were eleven races held in eight countries, most of them held over a distance of 1500 m swim, 40 km cycle, 10 km run (an Olympic-distance triathlon).

== Results ==
=== Saint Croix, U.S. Virgin Islands ===
- 1991-05-05 (2 km swim, 50 km bike, 12 km run; US$60,000)

Place	Men		Women	
Place	Name	Time	Name	Time
Gold medal	Mike Pigg (USA)	02:31:05	Carol Montgomery (CAN)	02:53:16
Silver medal	Greg Welch (AUS)	02:31:05	Karen Smyers (USA)	02:53:29
Bronze medal	Mark Allen (USA)	02:34:21	Paula Newby-Fraser (ZIM)	02:55:54

=== San Andrés, Colombia ===
- 1991-05-19 (1.5 km swim, 40 km bike, 10 km run; US$20,000)

Place	Men		Women	
Place	Name	Time	Name	Time
Gold medal	Dan Murray (CAN)	—	Karen Smyers (USA)	—

=== Portaferry, Ireland ===
- 1991-07-13 (1.1 km swim, 43 km bike, 10 km run; US$20,000)

Place	Men		Women	
Place	Name	Time	Name	Time
Gold medal	Andrew McNaughton (CAN)	—	Karen Smyers (USA)	—

=== Vancouver, British Columbia ===
- 1991-07-27 (1.5 km swim, 40 km bike, 10 km run; US$20,000)

Place	Men		Women	
Place	Name	Time	Name	Time
Gold medal	Greg Welch (AUS)	—	Sue Schlatter (CAN)	—

=== Toronto, Ontario ===
- 1991-08-04 (1.5 km swim, 40 km bike, 10 km run; US$20,000)

Place	Men		Women	
Place	Name	Time	Name	Time
Gold medal	Brad Beven (AUS)	—	Karen Smyers (USA)	—

=== Embrun, France ===
- 1991-08-15 (1.5 km swim, 40 km bike, 10 km run; US$30,000)

Place	Men		Women	
Place	Name	Time	Name	Time
Gold medal	Mark Allen (USA)	—	Melissa Mantak (USA)	—

=== Beijing, PR China ===
- 1991-09-01 (1.5 km swim, 40 km bike, 10 km run; US$20,000)

Place	Men		Women	
Place	Name	Time	Name	Time
Gold medal	Nick Croft (AUS)	01:44:10	Terri Smith-Ross (CAN)	02:02:08
Silver medal	Garrett McCar (USA)	01:44:11	Kendall Morrison (CAN)	02:03:02
Bronze medal	Frank Clarke (CAN)	01:50:40	Catherine Davies (ESP)	02:03:43

=== Texas Hill, United States ===
- 1991-09-07 (2.7 km swim, 88 km bike, 18 km run; US$20,000)

Place	Men		Women	
Place	Name	Time	Name	Time
Gold medal	Greg Welch (AUS)	—	Carol Montgomery (CAN)	—

=== Paris, France ===
- 1991-09-15 (1.5 km swim, 40 km bike, 10 km run; US$20,000)

Place	Men		Women	
Place	Name	Time	Name	Time
Gold medal	Rémi Rampteau (FRA)	—	Isabelle Mouthon (FRA)	—

=== Las Vegas, United States ===
- 1991-09-21 (1.5 km swim, 40 km bike, 10 km run; US$30,000)

Place	Men		Women	
Place	Name	Time	Name	Time
Gold medal	Mike Pigg (USA)	02:02:20	Erin Baker (NZL)	02:21:53
Silver medal	Greg Welch (AUS)	—	Karen Smyers (USA)	—
Bronze medal	Brad Kearns (USA)	—	Joy Hansen (USA)	—

=== Ixtapa, Mexico ===
- 1991-11-16 (1.5 km swim, 40 km bike, 10 km run; US$20,000)

Place	Men		Women	
Place	Name	Time	Name	Time
Gold medal	Brad Kearns (USA)	—	Karen Smyers (USA)	—

== Final ranking ==
Place	Men		Women	
Place	Name	Points	Name	Points
Gold medal	Leandro Macedo (BRA)	—	Karen Smyers (USA)	—
Silver medal	Greg Welch (AUS)	—	Terry Smith-Ross (CAN)	—
Bronze medal	Andrew McNaughton (CAN)	—	Catherine Davies (ESP)	—
4.	Ricardo González (MEX)	—	Sue Schlatter (CAN)	—
5.	Simon Cassidy (CAN)	—	Carol Montgomery (CAN)	—
6.	Garrett McCarthy (IRL)	—	María Luisa Martínez (MEX)	—
7.	Eben Jones (USA)	—	Melissa Mantak (USA)	—
8.	Frank Clarke (CAN)	—	Joanne Ritchie (CAN)	—
9.	Bernardo Zetina (MEX)	—	Kendall Morrison (CAN)	—
10.	Mike Pigg (USA)	—	Béatrice Mouthon (FRA)	—

== See also ==
- 1991 ITU Triathlon World Championships
