= 1991 ITU Triathlon World Championships =

Coordinates: 28.016667°S 153.4°E

The 1991 ITU Triathlon World Championships were held in Gold Coast, Australia on 12 and 13 October 1991.

== Results ==
=== Professional Men's ===
Rank	Name	Swim	Bike	Run	Time
Gold medal	Miles Stewart (AUS)	19:19	55:25	33:34	01:48:20
Silver medal	Rick Wells (NZL)	18:48	55:59	33:34	01:48:22
Bronze medal	Mike Pigg (USA)	19:33	55:10	33:36	01:48:22
4	Harold Robinson (USA)	19:19	55:29	33:58	01:48:49
5	Leandro Macedo (BRA)	19:36	57:11	32:42	01:49:33
6	Simon Lessing (GBR)	19:34	58:03	32:08	01:49:48
7	Mark Dragan (AUS)	19:47	58:02	31:59	01:49:48
8	Stephen Foster (AUS)	19:46	56:55	33:15	01:50:00
9	Patrick Girard (FRA)	21:40	56:28	32:27	01:50:39
10	Jim Riccitello (USA)	20:27	55:48	34:24	01:50:40

=== Professional Women's ===
Rank	Name	Swim	Bike	Run	Time
Gold medal	Joanne Ritchie (CAN)	21:58	01:02:08	37:55	02:02:04
Silver medal	Terri Smith-Ross (CAN)	22:27	01:02:58	36:45	02:02:10
Bronze medal	Michellie Jones (AUS)	22:05	01:03:27	37:16	02:02:49
4	Isabelle Mouthon-Michellys (FRA)	22:05	01:03:19	38:09	02:03:35
5	Catherine Davies (ESP)	22:41	01:03:56	37:02	02:03:41
6	Carol Montgomery (CAN)	22:07	01:02:28	39:24	02:04:00
7	Sue Schlatter (CAN)	23:52	01:02:31	37:57	02:04:21
8	Joy Hansen (USA)	22:04	01:04:15	38:02	02:04:23
9	Karen Smyers (USA)	22:06	01:03:19	39:02	02:04:30
10	Jan Ripple (USA)	22:03	01:03:28	39:32	02:05:05
11	Simone Mortier (GER)	22:30	01:04:16	38:38	02:05:22
12	Ute Schäfer (GER)	24:02	01:02:15	40:56	02:07:13

== See also ==
- 1991 ITU Triathlon World Cup
