= Triathlon at the 1995 Pan American Games =

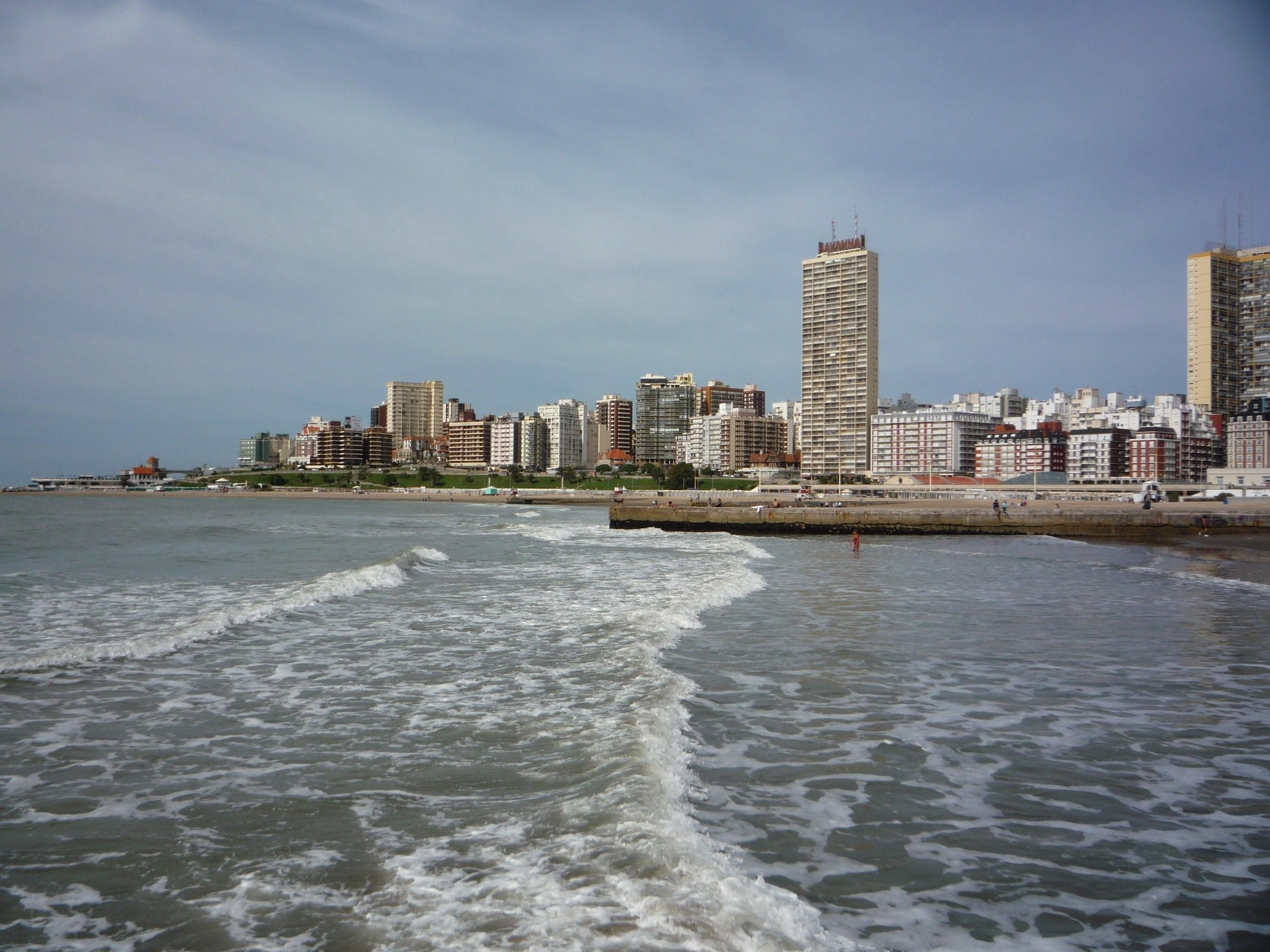
- Mar del Plata, host of the 1995 Pan American Games, on April 7, 2010.
- Venue: Mar del Plata
- Dates: March 26, 1995
- Competitors: 57

The triathlon competitions at the 1995 Pan American Games in Mar del Plata, Argentina, were scheduled on March 26. Triathlon is a sport that combines three different modalities, in which competitors compete for the best overall time. In total, 57 triathletes participated in the two events in the sport.

In the women's event, the American Karen Smyers won the gold medal. The podium was completed by Canadians Kristie Otto and Fiona Cribb, silver and bronze medalists, respectively. In the men's event, Brazil won the competition with Leandro Macedo. He was followed by Canadian Mark Bates and Argentine Oscar Galíndez.

== Events ==
Triathlon was included in the Pan American calendar in 1993. Two years later, the events were scheduled for March 26 in Mar del Plata. The Brazilian Susana Schnarndorf led the swimming race, followed by the American Gail Laurence. This remained in the first places, but ended up off the podium. In cycling, Canadian Kristie Otto had the best performance, followed by Karen Smyers and Gail. Smyers, however, overtook Otto in the last race, winning the gold. Fiona Cribb also won a position in the last race, completing the podium with the bronze medal. In the transition from swimming for men, the American Nataniel Llerandi took the lead with 17 minutes and 25 seconds, but lost positions during the race. Argentine Oscar Galíndez finished cycling in first position, he remained on the podium after finishing in third position, but was overtaken by Brazilian Leandro Macedo and Canadian Mark Bates.

Results of the individual men's event
Pos.	Triathlete	Time
1	Leandro Macedo (BRA)	1:51:14
2	Mark Bates (CAN)	1:51:36
3	Oscar Galíndez (ARG)	1:52:10
4	Ricardo Davila (MEX)	1:52:24
5	Andrew Carlson (USA)	1:53:33
6	Carlos Probert (MEX)	1:53:54
7	Matias Peña (CHI)	1:54:01
8	Ariel Garrigo (MEX)	1:54:14
9	Raul Lemir (ARG)	1:54:24
10	Bernardo Setina (MEX)	1:57:20
11	Will Cargas (COL)	1:57:27
12	Nataniel Llerandi (USA)	1:58:04
13	Ruben Arias (CHI)	1:58:44
14	Carlos Lomba (PER)	1:58:54
15	Juri Estrada (COL)	1:58:59
16	Ricardo Cardeño (COL)	2:00:37
17	Antônio Mansur (BRA)	2:01:01
18	Cristian Bustos (CHI)	2:01:13
19	Carlos Friely Paredes (GUA)	2:05:20
20	Pablo Antonio Rubio (HON)	2:06:59
21	Max Sevilla (CRC)	2:07:40
22	Claudio Cortes Cañas (CHI)	2:10:39
23	Jorge Rodríguez Sanchez (CRC)	2:10:57
24	Tim Byrne (CAY)	2:12:24
25	Wayne Edwards (BAR)	2:13:57
26	Rodolfo Carrillo (GUA)	2:14:54
27	Fredy Guillen Rodríguez (HON)	2:20:35
	Emerson Gomes (BRA)	DNF
	Stefan Jakobsen (CAN)	DNF
	Tim DeBoom (USA)	DNF
	Bernardo Gutierrez (HON)	DNF
	Stefan Jakobsen (CAN)	DNF
	Andrew MacMartin (CAN)	DNS

Results of the individual women's event
Pos.	Triathlete	Time
1	Karen Smyers (USA)	2:04:51
2	Kristie Otto (CAN)	2:07:16
3	Fiona Cribb (CAN)	2:08:14
4	Gail Laurence (USA)	2:08:51
5	Maria Luisa Martínez (MEX)	2:09:41
6	Lisa Bentley (CAN)	2:11:39
7	Maria del Carmen Ochoa (MEX)	2:11:58
8	Silvana Calcagno (ARG)	2:12:11
9	Maria Virginia Coronel (ARG)	2:12:49
10	Kelley Kwiatrowski (USA)	2:12:52
11	Márcia Ferreira (BRA)	2:14:22
12	Ana Carina Tonsig (ARG)	2:14:47
13	Maria Morales (COL)	2:14:50
14	Aglaê Menezes (BRA)	2:17:34
15	Susana Schnarndorf (BRA)	2:17:34
16	Laura Mata (CRC)	2:19:48
17	Maria Miño (CHI)	2:20:20
18	Veronica Granados (MEX)	2:22:45
19	Ana Maria Lecumberri (CHI)	2:26:10
20	Fabiola Acaron (PUR)	2:32:43
21	Joyce McKenzic (ISV)	2:34:58
22	Olga Camey (GUA)	2:39:42
	Libia Gonzalez (COL)	DNF
	Karla Solis (CRC)	DNF

== Medalists ==
American triathlete Karen Smyers won the gold medal in the women's event, while Canadian Kristie Otto and Fiona Cribb won silver and bronze medals, respectively. The male event ended with the victory of Brazilian Leandro Macedo; the podium was completed by triathletes Mark Bates (silver medalist) and Oscar Galíndez (bronze medalist).

Event	Gold	Silver	Bronze
Women	Karen Smyers; United States	Kristie Otto; Canada	Fiona Cribb; Canada
Male	Leandro Macedo; Brazil	Mark Bates; Canada	Oscar Galíndez; Argentina
Women Team	United States; United States	Canada; Canada	Mexico; Mexico
Male team	Mexico; Mexico	Argentina; Argentina	United States; United States

== Medal board ==
In this edition, the United States is the leadership of the medal table, winning the most gold medals, respectively. However, Canada was the country with the most medals won; the country kept the two silvers distributed and also obtained a bronze. Finally, Argentina finished with the men's bronze medal.

Rank	Nation	Gold	Silver	Bronze	Total
1	United States	2	0	1	3
2	Mexico	1	0	1	2
3	Brazil	1	0	0	1
4	Canada	0	3	1	4
5	Argentina	0	1	1	2
Totals (5 entries)		4	4	4	12
