= Antwan January =

American basketball player

Hillcrest Prep Academy
- Position: Power forward / center

Personal information
- Born: July 29, 1999 (age 27) Los Angeles, California
- Listed height: 6 ft 9 in (2.06 m)

Career information
- High school: Taft High School (Woodland Hills, California); Beverly Hills High School; (Beverly Hills, California): Hillcrest Prep Academy (Phoenix, Arizona)

Antwan January (born July 29, 1999) is an American basketball player for Hillcrest Prep Academy in Phoenix, Arizona. January is from Los Angeles, California, and is a four-star recruit in the 2019 class.

In May 2019, January committed to play college basketball at the University of New Mexico.

College recruiting
Name	Hometown	School	Height	Weight	Commit date
Antwan January; PF	Los Angeles, California	Hillcrest Prep Academy	6 ft 11 in (2.11 m)	240 lb (110 kg)	Nov 13, 2018
Antwan January; PF	Recruit ratings: Scout: Rivals: 247Sports: ESPN: (82)				
Overall recruit ranking: Rivals: 120 247Sports: 89
Note: In many cases, Scout, Rivals, 247Sports, On3, and ESPN may conflict in their listings of height and weight.; In these cases, the average was taken. ESPN grades are on a 100-point scale.; Sources: "2019 Team Ranking". Rivals.
