= 1990 ITU Triathlon World Championships =

The 1990 ITU Triathlon World Championships were held in Orlando, United States on September 15, 1990.

== Results ==
=== Professional Men's ===
Rank	Name	Swim	Bike	Run	Time
Gold medal	Greg Welch (AUS)	20:21	56:19	32:39	01:51:36
Silver medal	Brad Beven (AUS)	18:56	57:36	33:54	01:52:40
Bronze medal	Stephen Foster (AUS)	20:18	56:17	33:43	01:52:46
4	Luc Van Lierde (BEL)	20:26	56:17	33:57	01:53:01
5	Rob Barel (NED)	20:25	56:19	34:15	01:53:11
6	Rob Mackle (USA)	18:53	55:34	36:55	01:53:37
7	Simon Lessing (GBR)	19:28	56:55	34:36	01:53:49
8	Danilo Palmucci (ITA)	20:57	55:48	34:43	01:53:52
9	Nick Taylor (CAN)	20:57	55:57	34:52	01:53:56
10	Rick Wells (NZL)	18:52	57:54	35:20	01:54:20
11	Carlos Santamaria (ESP)	21:04	56:55	33:42	01:54:34
12	Philippe Methlon (FRA)	21:04	55:09	36:08	01:54:43
13	Patrick Girard (FRA)	22:28	55:51	34:08	01:54:57
14	Vincent Jay (FRA)	20:16	56:19	36:07	01:55:12
15	Eduardo Burguete (ESP)	20:07	58:13	34:20	01:55:16
16	Andreas Claus (GDR)	20:29	55:59	36:13	01:55:35
17	Pim van den Bos (NED)	22:44	55:44	34:54	01:55:35
18	Jos Everts (NED)	21:06	57:20	34:56	01:55:48
19	Karel Blondeel (BEL)	20:59	56:30	37:23	01:56:31
20	Erwin de Bruijn (NED)	20:06	56:31	37:30	01:56:45
21	Marizio De Benedetti (ITA)	20:33	56:00	38:00	01:57:13

=== Professional Women's ===
Rank	Name	Swim	Bike	Run	Time
Gold medal	Karen Smyers (USA)	22:03	01:02:27	36:37	02:03:32
Silver medal	Carol Montgomery (CAN)	22:01	01:02:32	36:36	02:03:46
Bronze medal	Joy Hansen (AUS)	21:55	01:02:46	36:42	02:03:49
4	Erin Baker (NZL)	21:58	01:01:33	38:37	02:04:30
5	Colleen Cannon (USA)	21:59	01:02:34	39:04	02:05:59
6	Laurie Samuelson (USA)	21:50	01:02:46	39:17	02:06:26
7	Katie Webb (USA)	22:05	01:02:36	40:33 0	2:07:48
8	Terri Smith-Ross (CAN)	23:04	01:03:27	39:09	02:08:15
9	Liz Hepple (AUS)	22:48	01:03:45	39:40	02:08:45
10	Kendall Morrison (CAN)	24:49	01:02:28	39:37	02:09:13
11	Thea Sijbesma (NED)	22:15	01:04:12	40:16	02:09:19
12	Simone Mortier (FRG)	23:07	01:03:21	41:35	02:10:33
13	Sylvie Muguet (FRA)	22:02	01:04:33	41:58	02:11:11
14	Mandy Dean (GBR)	21:36	01:04:48	42:13	02:11:29
15	Sonja Krolik (FRG)	24:01	01:05:04	40:03	02:11:31
16	Ute Schäfer (FRG)	24:43	01:04:02	41:33	02:12:45
17	Isabelle Mouthon-Michellys (FRA)	22:46	01:03:41	43:47	02:12:53
18	Jeannine De Ruysscher (BEL)	22:37	01:03:40	43:27	02:09:17
