= Upland Outlaws =

1993 novel by Dave Duncan

- First edition
- Author: Dave Duncan
- Cover artist: Jim Burns (Jacket painting)
- Language: English
- Series: A Handful of Men
- Genre: Fantasy novel
- Publisher: Del Rey (1st edition)
- Publication date: 1 May 1993
- Publication place: United States
- Media type: Print (Hardback & Paperback)
- ISBN: 0-345-37897-0
- OCLC: 27174177
- Dewey Decimal: 813/.54 20
- LC Class: PR9199.3.D847 U6 1993
- Preceded by: The Cutting Edge
- Followed by: The Stricken Field

Upland Outlaws is a fantasy novel by Dave Duncan, following The Cutting Edge.

== Plot ==
The sorcerer Zinixo has taken control of Hub, but life goes on as normal. As Zinixo and his Covin track down Rap and friends, Rap must get the word out to the other sorcerers about the plans to join together and destroy Zinixo. Having escaped across the Cenmere Sea, the group takes to ship and sets sail.

== Characters ==
- Ylo Yllipo - Signifier for Shandie and the XXth legion. Last of his line
- Thaïle - Pixie in Thume
- Shandie - Emshandar V. Imperor, although in exile. (This exile is unknown to the general populace, as Zinixo used Shandie's cousin and illusion magic to make it look like Shandie is still running the Impire.)
- Sir Acopulo – Shandie's chief political advisor & tactician
- Lord Umpily – Shandie's chief of protocol & spymaster
- Hardgraa – Shandie's chief of bodyguard, currently guarding Eshiala
- Kadie – Princess of Krasnegar. Twin of Gath
- Inosolan – Queen of Krasnegar
- Gath – Prince of Krasnegar. Twin of Kadie. Has the gift of Prescience
- Rap – King of Krasnegar, ex-stableboy, ex-demigod, and sorcerer
- Zinixo – Dwarven sorcerer secretly running the Impire
- Eshiala – Princess and wife of Shandie
- Eigaze - Impish countess, relative of Inosolan
- Raspnex – Warlock and Warden of the north
- Jarga - Jotunn sorceress, votary of Raspnex
- Thinnal - Impish thief
- Sagorn - Jotunn scholar
- Andor - Impish libertine
- Death Bird - Goblin King

== Allusions/references to other works ==
The history of Rap, Insolan, and a younger Shandie are recounted in the series A Man of His Word by Dave Duncan.

== Allusions/references to actual history ==
There are allusions to the Roman Empire, in the military structure and names of the Empire.

== Release details ==
- 1993, USA, Del Rey, ISBN 0-345-37897-0, Pub date 1 May 1993, hardcover (First edition)
- 1993, USA, Del Rey, ISBN 0-345-38477-6, Pub date 1 October 1993, Paperback
- 1995, UK ?, Constable and Robinson, ISBN 1-85487-352-0, Pub date 20 June 1995, Paperback
