= 1992 in sports =

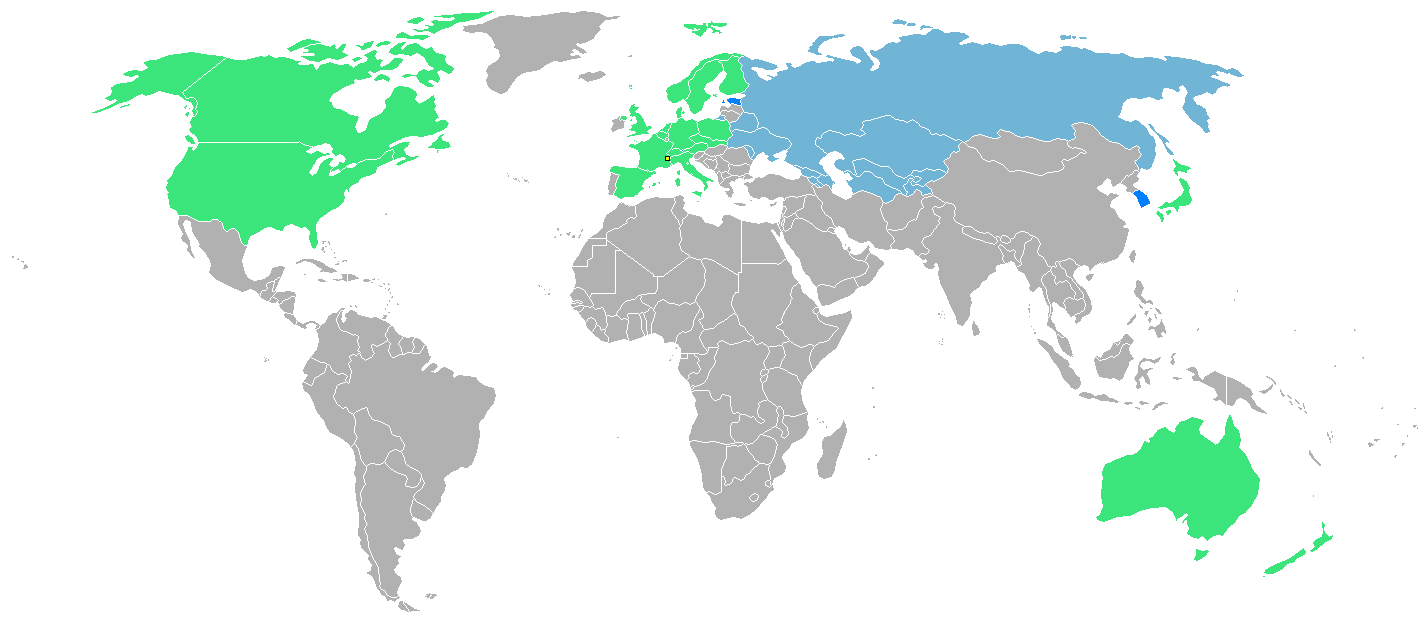
1992 Paralympic games countries

1992 in sports describes the year's events in world sport.

== Alpine skiing ==
- Alpine Skiing World Cup
- Men's overall season champion: Paul Accola, Switzerland
- Women's overall season champion: Petra Kronberger, Austria

== American football ==
- Super Bowl XXVI – the Washington Redskins (NFC) won 37–24 over the Buffalo Bills (AFC)
  - Location: Metrodome
  - Attendance: 63,130
  - MVP: Mark Rypien, QB (Washington)
- Orange Bowl (1991 season):
  - The Miami Hurricanes won 22-0 over the Nebraska Cornhuskers to win the AP Poll national championship
- Steve Emtman is the No. 1 pick in the 1992 NFL draft by the Indianapolis Colts
- June 25 – death of Jerome Brown (27), Philadelphia Eagles player, in a car crash
- Steve Young (American football), quarterback of the San Francisco 49ers, wins the 1992 NFL MVP
- November 29 – Dennis Byrd of the New York Jets is paralyzed from a neck injury during a game against the Kansas City Chiefs. He made a recovery that bordered on the miraculous; although he would never play again, he would walk unassisted several months later.
- Gino Torretta of the Miami Hurricanes wins the Heisman Trophy, Davey O'Brien Award and Walter Camp Award

== Association football ==
- June 26 – In Euro 1992, Denmark surprisingly won 2–0 over Germany at Nya Ullevi, Gothenburg, Sweden.
- November 25 - UEFA Champions League debuts with four opening day matches.
- December 5

Charlton Athletic FC return to The Valley after a seven year exodus playing at Selhurst Park and Upton Park, and a long struggle to return:

Charlton supporters formed a political party called 'The Valley Party' to contest the local May 1990 Greenwich elections on one single policy: to return to The Valley.

It was a lively debate about something which mattered deeply to the community, and using a professional poster campaign that startled the mainstream political parties, The Valley Part obtained 14,838 votes as the team slipped back into the Second Division. A modest proposal for The Valley was put together – and promptly delayed for six months by a strike in Greenwich’s planning department.

In April 1991, a scheme was at last approved. The final matches were counted down at Selhurst, only to have to report, mid-summer, that the new venue would not be The Valley but Upton Park.

The club had run out of time to get the ground ready for the start of the 1991/92 season. Weeks later it became clear it had also run out of money. The contractors had pulled off site because they had not been paid.

The financially stricken Norris quit the board. New directors Martin Simons and Richard Murray took up the slack, along with Roger Alwen, who had become chairman in 1989.

Yet another season rolled by until the club and fans came up with the Valley Investment Plan to contribute towards the necessary finance. It was launched in June 1992.

The scheme, which offered fans ten years of free or discounted tickets in return for an upfront payment, pulled in £1m, towards an eventual £4.5m bill. Another £1m was contributed as a grant by the Football Trust. Directors bravely stumped up the rest.

So finally, in December 1992, seven years, two months and two weeks after the “last” match at The Valley, the Addicks returned home, amid many tears and cheers, beating Portsmouth 1-0.

== Athletics ==
- 1992 Summer Olympics held in Barcelona, Spain July 25 – August 9.
- 1992 Winter Olympics held in Albertville, France February 8 – February 23
- March 1 – Madina Biktagirova set a course record at the Los Angeles Marathon in a time of 2:26:23.

== Australian rules football ==
- Australian Football League
  - May 3 – Geelong beat Fitzroy's 1979 record score when they kick 37.17 (239) to Brisbane's 11.9 (75)
  - August 23 – West Coast kick only 0.2 (2) to three-quarter time against Footscray on a waterlogged Western Oval for the lowest three-quarter-time score since 1953.
  - September 26 – West Coast win the 96th AFL premiership, beating Geelong 16.17 (113) to 12.13 (85)
  - Geelong kick a record total of 3,558 points during the season, beating their own record from 1989.
  - Brownlow Medal awarded to Scott Wynd (Footscray)

== Baseball ==
- World Series – Toronto Blue Jays won 4 games to 2 over the Atlanta Braves. The Series MVP is Pat Borders, Toronto.
- The Toronto Blue Jays became the first Canadian team to play in a World Series and the first non-American team to win the World Series.

AWARDS and HONORS

- Most Valuable Player
  - Dennis Eckersley, Oakland Athletics (AL)
  - Barry Bonds, Pittsburgh Pirates (NL)
- Cy Young Award
  - Dennis Eckersley, Oakland Athletics (AL)
  - Greg Maddux, Chicago Cubs (NL)
- Rookie of the Year
  - Pat Listach, Milwaukee Brewers (AL)
  - Eric Karros, Los Angeles Dodgers (NL)
- Rolaids Relief Man of the Year Award
  - Dennis Eckersley, Oakland Athletics (AL)
  - Lee Smith, St. Louis Cardinals (NL)
- Manager of the Year
  - Tony La Russa, Oakland Athletics (AL)
  - Jim Leyland, Pittsburgh Pirates (NL)

*College World Series Pepperdine Waves defeat Cal State Fullerton Titans 3–2

- Phil Nevin of Cal State Fullerton Titans is named the tournaments Most Outstanding Player and awarded the Golden Spikes Award for college player of the year

== Basketball ==
- European Cup – Partizan beats Joventut 71:70
- NCAA Men's Basketball Championship – Duke Blue Devils wins 71–51 over Michigan Wolverines
- Christian Laettner is named Naismith College Player of the Year
- NBA Finals – Chicago Bulls win 4 games to 2 over the Portland Trail Blazers
- Most Valuable Player: Michael Jordan, Chicago Bulls
- Rookie of the Year: Larry Johnson, Charlotte Hornets
- Defensive Player of the Year: David Robinson, San Antonio Spurs
- Sixth Man of the Year: Detlef Schrempf, Indiana Pacers
- Most Improved Player: Pervis Ellison, Washington Bullets
- Coach of the Year: Don Nelson, Golden State Warriors
- All-NBA First Team:
  - F – Karl Malone, Utah Jazz
  - F – Chris Mullin, Golden State Warriors
  - C – David Robinson, San Antonio Spurs
  - G – Michael Jordan, Chicago Bulls
  - G – Clyde Drexler, Portland Trail Blazers
- All-NBA Second Team:
  - F – Scottie Pippen, Chicago Bulls
  - F – Charles Barkley, Philadelphia 76ers
  - C – Patrick Ewing, New York Knicks
  - G – Tim Hardaway, Golden State Warriors
  - G – John Stockton, Utah Jazz
- All-NBA Third Team:
  - F – Dennis Rodman, Detroit Pistons
  - F – Kevin Willis, Atlanta Hawks
  - C – Brad Daugherty, Cleveland Cavaliers
  - G – Mark Price, Cleveland Cavaliers
  - G – Kevin Johnson, Phoenix Suns
- All-NBA Rookie Team:
  - Steve Smith, Miami Heat
  - Larry Johnson, Charlotte Hornets
  - Billy Owens, Golden State Warriors
  - Stacey Augmon, Atlanta Hawks
  - Dikembe Mutombo, Denver Nuggets
- NBA All-Defensive First Team:
  - Dennis Rodman, Detroit Pistons
  - Scottie Pippen, Chicago Bulls
  - David Robinson, San Antonio Spurs
  - Michael Jordan, Chicago Bulls
  - Joe Dumars, Detroit Pistons
- NBA All-Defensive Second Team:
  - Larry Nance, Cleveland Cavaliers
  - Buck Williams, Portland Trail Blazers
  - Patrick Ewing, New York Knicks
  - John Stockton, Utah Jazz
  - Micheal Williams, Indiana Pacers
- National Basketball League (Australia) Finals: South East Melbourne Magic defeated the Melbourne Tigers 2–1 in the best-of-three final series.

== Boxing ==
- November 13 – Riddick Bowe won a 12 round decision over Evander Holyfield to win the undisputed heavyweight championship.
- Oscar De La Hoya won the only Gold Medal in the Barcelona Olympic Games for the United States. He turned pro shortly after.

== Canadian football ==
- Grey Cup – Calgary Stampeders won 24–10 over the Winnipeg Blue Bombers
- Vanier Cup – Queen's Golden Gaels win 31–0 over the St. Mary's Huskies

== Cricket ==
- Cricket World Cup – Pakistan beat England by 22 runs

== Cycling ==
- Giro d'Italia won by Miguel Indurain of Spain
- Tour de France – Miguel Indurain of Spain
- UCI Road World Championships – Men's road race – Gianni Bugno of Italy

== Dogsled racing ==
- Iditarod Trail Sled Dog Race Champion –
  - Martin Buser wins with lead dogs: Tyrone & D2

== Darts ==
Phil Taylor (darts player) won his second world title

The Professional Darts Corporation was formed but did not have its first world championship until 1993

== Field hockey ==
- Men's Champions Trophy: Germany
- Olympic Games men's competition: Germany

== Figure skating ==
- World Figure Skating Championships –
  - Men's champion: Viktor Petrenko, CIS
  - Ladies' champion: Kristi Yamaguchi, United States
  - Pair skating champions: Natalia Mishkutenok & Artur Dmitriev, CIS
  - Ice dancing champions: Marina Klimova & Sergei Ponomarenko, CIS

== Gaelic Athletic Association ==
- Camogie
  - All-Ireland Camogie Champion: Cork
  - National Camogie League: Cork
- Gaelic football
  - All-Ireland Senior Football Championship – Donegal 0–18 died Dublin 0–14
  - National Football League – Derry 1–10 died Tyrone 1–8
- Ladies' Gaelic football
  - All-Ireland Senior Football Champion: Waterford
  - National Football League: Waterford
- Hurling
  - All-Ireland Senior Hurling Championship – Kilkenny 3–10 died Cork 1–12
  - National Hurling League – Limerick 2–6 beat Tipperary 0–10

== Golf ==
Men's professional

- Masters Tournament – Fred Couples
- U.S. Open – Tom Kite
- British Open – Nick Faldo
- PGA Championship – Nick Price
- PGA Tour money leader – Fred Couples – $1,344,188
- Senior PGA Tour money leader – Lee Trevino – $1,027,002

Men's amateur

- British Amateur – Stephen Dundas
- U.S. Amateur – Justin Leonard
- European Amateur – Massimo Scarpa

Women's professional

- Nabisco Dinah Shore – Dottie Mochrie
- LPGA Championship – Betsy King
- U.S. Women's Open – Patty Sheehan
- Classique du Maurier – Sherri Steinhauer
- LPGA Tour money leader – Dottie Mochrie – $693,335
- The European team beat the United States team 11 1/2 points to 6 1/2, to win the Solheim Cup for the first time.

== Harness racing ==
- Pacer Artsplace voted "Harness Horse of the Year"
- North America Cup – Safely Kept
- United States Pacing Triple Crown races –
  1. Cane Pace – Western Hanover
  2. Little Brown Jug – Fake Left
  3. Messenger Stakes – Western Hanover
- United States Trotting Triple Crown races –
  1. Hambletonian – Alf Palema
  2. Yonkers Trot – Magic Lobell
  3. Kentucky Futurity – Armbro Keepsake
- Australian Inter Dominion Harness Racing Championship –
  - Pacers: Westburn Grant
  - Trotters: William Dee

== Horse racing ==
Steeplechases

- Cheltenham Gold Cup – Cool Ground
- Grand National – Party Politics

Flat races

- Australia – Melbourne Cup won by Subzero
- Canada – Queen's Plate won by Alydeed
- France – Prix de l'Arc de Triomphe won by Subotica
- Ireland – Irish Derby Stakes won by St Jovite
- Japan – Japan Cup won by Tokai Teio
- English Triple Crown Races:
  1. 2,000 Guineas Stakes – Rodrigo de Triano
  2. The Derby – Dr Devious
  3. St. Leger Stakes – User Friendly
- United States Triple Crown Races:
  1. Kentucky Derby – Lil E. Tee
  2. Preakness Stakes – Pine Bluff
  3. Belmont Stakes – A.P. Indy
- Breeders' Cup World Thoroughbred Championships:
  1. Breeders' Cup Classic – A.P. Indy
  2. Breeders' Cup Ladies' Classic – Paseana
  3. Breeders' Cup Juvenile – Gilded Time
  4. Breeders' Cup Juvenile Fillies – Eliza
  5. Breeders' Cup Mile – Lure
  6. Breeders' Cup Sprint – Thirty Slews
  7. Breeders' Cup Turf – Fraise

== Ice hockey ==
- April 1 – The NHL had their first work stoppage as NHL players went on strike. The strike lasted only 10 days and the rest of the regular season games were played.
- Art Ross Trophy as the NHL's leading scorer during the regular season: Mario Lemieux, Pittsburgh Penguins
- Hart Memorial Trophy for the NHL's Most Valuable Player: Mark Messier, New York Rangers
- Stanley Cup – Pittsburgh Penguins won 4 games to 0 over the Chicago Blackhawks
- Conn Smythe Trophy – Mario Lemieux, Pittsburgh Penguins
- World Hockey Championship
  - Men's champion: Sweden defeated Finland
  - Junior Men's champion: Unified former USSR defeated Sweden
  - Women's champion: Canada defeated the United States
- September 23 – Manon Rhéaume became the first woman to play in the National Hockey League during a pre-season game, and also the first woman ever to play in one of the Big Four Pro Sports.

== Lacrosse ==
- The Buffalo Bandits defeat the Philadelphia Wings 11–10 in overtime to win the Major Indoor Lacrosse League championship

== Radiosport ==
- Sixth Amateur Radio Direction Finding World Championship held in Siófok, Hungary.

== Rugby league ==
- Challenge Cup tournament culminates in Wigan's 28–12 win over Castleford in the final at Wembley Stadium before 77,286
- Rugby Football League Championship is won by Wigan
- 3 June – Sydney, Australia: 1992 State of Origin is won by New South Wales in the third and deciding match of the series against Queensland at the Sydney Football Stadium before 41,878
- June/July – The 1992 Great Britain Lions tour of Australia and New Zealand takes place
- 27 September – Sydney, Australia: 1992 NSWRL season Grand Final is won 28–8 by Brisbane Broncos against St George Dragons at Sydney Football Stadium before 41,560
- 24 October – London, England: 1989–92 World Cup tournament culminates in Australia's 10–6 win over Great Britain in the final at Wembley Stadium before 73,631
- 30 October – Wigan, England: 1992 World Club Challenge match is won by the Brisbane Broncos who defeat Wigan 22–8 at Central Park before 17,764

== Rugby union ==
- 98th Five Nations Championship series is won by England who complete the Grand Slam

== Snooker ==
- World Snooker Championship – Stephen Hendry beats Jimmy White 18–14
- World rankings – Stephen Hendry remains world number one for 1992/93

== Swimming ==
- XXV Olympic Games, held in Barcelona, Spain (July 26 – July 31)
- Second European Sprint Championships, held in Espoo, Finland (December 21 – 22)
  - Germany wins the most medals (14), Germany and Sweden the most gold medals (4)

== Tennis ==
- Grand Slam in tennis men's results:
  - Australian Open – Jim Courier
  - French Open – Jim Courier
  - Wimbledon – Andre Agassi
  - U.S. Open – Stefan Edberg
- Grand Slam in tennis women's results:
  - Australian Open – Monica Seles
  - French Open – Monica Seles
  - Wimbledon – Steffi Graf
  - U.S. Open – Monica Seles
- 1992 Summer Olympics
  - Men's Singles Competition: Marc Rosset
  - Women's Singles Competition: Jennifer Capriati
  - Men's Doubles Competition: Boris Becker & Michael Stich
  - Women's Doubles Competition: Gigi Fernández & Mary Joe Fernández
- Davis Cup
  - United States won 3–1 over Switzerland in world tennis.

== Triathlon ==
- ITU World Championships held in Huntsville, Canada
- ITU World Cup (ten races) started in Colombia and ended in Mexico
- ETU European Championships held in Lommel, Belgium

== Volleyball ==
- Men's World League: Italy
- Olympic Games men's competition: Brazil
- Olympic Games women's competition: Cuba

== Yacht racing ==
- San Diego Yacht Club retains the America's Cup as America³ defeats Italian challenger Il Moro de Venezia, from the Compagnia della Vella yacht club, 4 races to 1

== Water polo ==
- Olympic Games men's competition: Italy

== Multi-sport events ==
- 1992 Summer Olympics takes place in Barcelona, Spain
  - The Unified Team (formerly Soviet Union) wins the most medals (112) and the most gold medals (45).
- 1992 Winter Olympics takes place in Albertville, France
  - Germany wins the most medals (27) and the most gold medals (10).
- Seventh Pan Arab Games held in Damascus, Syria

== Awards ==
- Associated Press Male Athlete of the Year – Michael Jordan, NBA basketball
- Associated Press Female Athlete of the Year – Monica Seles, Tennis
- Sports Illustrated Sportsman of the Year – Arthur Ashe
- Sporting News Sportsman of the Year – Mike Krzyzewski Duke Blue Devils head coach
- James E. Sullivan Award Bonnie Blair, speed skating
