= The Cutting Edge (novel) =

1992 novel by Dave Duncan

- First edition
- Author: Dave Duncan
- Cover artist: Jim Burns (Jacket painting)
- Language: English
- Series: A Handful of Men
- Genre: Fantasy
- Publisher: Del Rey Books
- Publication date: 1 September 1992
- Publication place: United States
- Media type: Print (hardback & paperback)
- Pages: 388 pp (hardcover edition) (1st edition)
- ISBN: 0-345-37896-2
- OCLC: 25915310
- Dewey Decimal: 813/.54 20
- LC Class: PR9199.3.D847 C88 1992
- Preceded by: Emperor and Clown of the Man of His Word series
- Followed by: Upland Outlaws

The Cutting Edge is a fantasy novel by Dave Duncan.

== Plot introduction ==
"The world of Pandemia seethes with tension as imperial troops wage war along its borderlands and omens predict disaster. When the Protocol which restricts the use of magic begins to break down, only a few handpicked people have a chance to preserve the balance of their crumbling society."

== Plot summary ==
The year 3000 is approaching, and life continues as normal for most people. A few, however, are aware that the Protocol (the rules that determine how magic may be used) of the past thousand years is breaking down.

Shandie is battling the Caliph in Zark, and gains himself a new Signifier when Ylo saves the banner from falling. While they follow Imperial decrees and take the war to the elves, King Rap in Krasnegar receives a warning from the gods that he must lose one of his children. After his son sees a vision of a legionary, he realizes that this has to do with the upcoming millennium, he sets out for Hub, the capital of the Impire, to speak with his friend the Imperor.

Thaïle, a Gifted pixie in mysterious Thume, stands Death Watch over a neighbor, and receives her first Word of power. This earns her interest from the College, and Jain arrives at her parents' house to talk to Thaïle. He informs her she will be going to the College next year, and there is nothing she can do about it.

After suffering defeat from summoned dragons at Nefer Moor, the Legion retreats back to Qoble. Shandie and his inner circle decide to head to Hub to speak with the Imperor. Instead of traveling conventionally, they race to Hub to beat the message of their coming. On the way, a cloaked Pixie visits them and tells them of a preflecting pool at Wold Hall (putting your left foot in the pool shows you what you should seek, your right foot shows you what you should avoid). They detour to visit it, and each person's vision guides their actions afterwards.

Thaïle, despondent over not being allowed to meet a man and have her own Place, meets Leéb. They fall in love and find a Place far from home. Thaïle hopes that the College won't find her or care about her, but the College catches up with her just as her child is born. They spirit Thaïle away to the College and the Keeper.

Shandie and company arrive in Hub, and find the Imperor a deranged, drooling husk of his former self. Shandie immediately seizes administrative control, and plans on how to meet with the young man he saw in the pool (who turns out to be Rap son). Ylo's vision was a lovely women naked amid daffodils, and the woman turns out to be Princess Eshiala. When the Imperor finally falls into a coma and dies, preparations are made for the upcoming coronation of Shandie.

During practice, the Warlock Raspnex appears and tells the procession to crown Shandie immediately. Ylo takes charge and completes the ceremony just as the four warlocks' thrones are destroyed by magic. The group meets for a council of war, and go to Dr. Sagorn's house (the vision seen by Sir Acopulo). Rap has just arrived and meets the group at the doctor's house. As they try to puzzle out what is going on, Raspnex shows up and tells them that the evil sorcerer Zinixo is taking over all of the sorcerers in the world, and plans to take over all of Pandemia. After a short discussion, the house is attacked, and Raspnex uses magic to whisk the group away to safety.

== Characters ==
- Emshandar IV - Imperor
- Ylo Yllipo - Signifier for Shandie and the XXth legion. Last of his line
- Thaïle - Pixie in Thume
- Shandie - Emshandar V. Heir apparent and Prince of the Impire
- Sir Acopulo – Shandie's chief political advisor & tactician
- Lord Umpily – Shandie's chief of protocol & spymaster
- Hardgraa – Shandie's chief of bodyguard
- Kadie (Kadolan)– Princess of Krasnegar. Twin of Gath
- Inosolan – Queen of Krasnegar. Rap's wife. ex-sorceress
- Gath (Gathmore) – Prince of Krasnegar. Twin of Kadie. Has the gift of Prescience (a single word, garnered from a death watch).
- Rap – King of Krasnegar, ex-stableboy, ex-demigod, and sorcerer
- Zinixo – Dwarven sorcerer imprisoned by Rap
- Efflio – Captain of the Sea Beauty and Imperial trader
- Eshiala – Princess and wife of Shandie
- Jain – Recorder for the Thume College
- Gaib - Thaïle's father
- Leeb – Husband to Thaïle
- Death Bird - Goblin King
- Olybino – Warlock and Warden of the east
- Raspnex – Warlock and Warden of the north
- Lith'rian – Warlock and Warden of the south
- Grunth – Witch and Warden of the west

== Allusions or references to other works ==
The history of Rap, Insolan, and a younger Shandie are recounted in the series A Man of His Word by Dave Duncan.

== Allusions or references to actual history, geography and current science ==
There are allusions to the Roman Empire, in the military structure and names of the Impire.

The land of Zark, which features prominently in the first series and again briefly in this story, is based largely upon cultural and geographic elements from the Middle East.

== Release details ==
- 1992, United States, Del Rey, ISBN 0-345-37896-2, Pub date 1 September 1992, Hardcover
- 1993, United States, Del Rey, ISBN 0-345-38167-X, Pub date 1 April 1993, Paperback
- 1994, United Kingdom, Constable & Robinson, ISBN 1-85487-348-2, Pub date 1 November 1994, Paperback
