= West of January =

1989 novel by Dave Duncan

- Author: Dave Duncan
- Language: English
- Genre: Fantasy novel
- Publication date: 1989 (1st edition)
- Media type: Print (Trade paperback & Paperback)
- ISBN: 0-345-35836-8 (1st edition)
- OCLC: 20184025
- LC Class: CPB Box no. 2609 vol. 21

West of January is a fantasy novel by Dave Duncan. The book won the 1990 Prix Aurora Award (Canadian Science Fiction and Fantasy) for Best Long-Form Work in English.

== Plot ==
The novel is set on a world called Vernier, on which the cycle of day and night lasts two hundred years. It describes the journey of discovery of Knobil, a herdsman born on the grasslands of Vernier.
