= Tim DeBoom =

American triathlete

Personal information
- Born: November 4, 1970 (age 55) Cedar Rapids, Iowa, United States

Sport
- Sport: Triathlon
Medal record
Men's Triathlon
Representing the United States
Ironman World Championship
Gold medal – first place	2001	Men's race
Gold medal – first place	2002	Men's race
Silver medal – second place	2000	Men's race
Bronze medal – third place	1999	Men's race
Pan American Games
Bronze medal – third place	1995 Mar del Plata	Men's team

Tim DeBoom (born November 4, 1970), is a retired professional triathlete from Boulder, Colorado, from 1995 to 2012. During that tenure, DeBoom participated in hundreds of triathlons around the world, winning both short course and long course triathlons. After a 10th place finish in the Hawaii Ironman in 1995, DeBoom focused on long distance racing, eventually winning the Ironman Triathlon World Championship in Hawaii twice (2001 & 2002).

Toward the end of his triathlon career, DeBoom won the infamous Norseman triathlon, becoming the first non-European man to achieve the feat. He completed the three part race in 11 hours, 18 minutes and 52 seconds.

Tim was inducted into the Hawaii Ironman Hall of Fame in 2019.

DeBoom graduated from the University of Iowa with Bachelor of Science degrees in exercise physiology and anatomy.

Personal Life: Tim is married to Nicole (Molzahn) DeBoom (Dec 28, 1996) and has one daughter, Wilder DeBoom.

== Accomplishments ==
=== Ironman Hawaii ===
- 1999: 3rd
- 2000: 2nd
- 2001: 1st
- 2002: 1st
- 2007: 4th

=== Other notable accomplishments ===
- 1993 Amateur National Champion
- 1994 Amateur National Champion
- 1994 Triathlon magazine Amateur Athlete of the Year
- 1995 Pan Am Games: 3rd
- 1999 Ironman New Zealand: 1st
- 2001 Ironman California: 1st
- 2002 Eagleman 1/2: 1st
- 2003 California 1/2: 1st
- 2003 Wildflower: 1st
- 2005 Man A Mano: 1st
- 2005 Soma 1/2: 1st
- 2006 Ironman Arizona: 3rd
- 2007 Ironman Arizona: 2nd
- 2008 Longhorn 1/2: 5th
- 2011 Norseman extreme triathlon: 1st
