= Dave Duncan (writer) =

Scottish Canadian speculative fiction author (1933–2018)

- Born: David John Duncan; 30 June 1933; Newport-on-Tay, Fife, Scotland
- Died: 29 October 2018 (aged 85); Victoria, British Columbia
- Occupation: Author
- Spouse(s): Janet Duncan (m. 1959)
- Parent(s): Norman and Winifred Duncan

David John Duncan (30 June 1933 – 29 October 2018) was a Canadian fantasy and science fiction author.

== Biography ==
Duncan was born in Newport-on-Tay, Scotland and was educated at the High School of Dundee before studying geology at the University of St Andrews. After graduating in 1955, he moved to Calgary, Alberta, becoming a Canadian citizen in 1960. He pursued a career as a geologist in the petroleum industry for nearly three decades before he started writing science fiction and fantasy novels. He made his first sale (A Rose-Red City) two years later in 1986 at the age of 53, just two weeks after his 31-year career as a geologist came to an end due to a slump in the oil business, at which point he switched to full-time writing.

Duncan lived in Victoria, British Columbia. His wife was Janet, whom he married in 1959, and they had one son, two daughters, and four grandchildren. He had one brother, Michael, who was an agriculturist.

Duncan died on 29 October 2018 at the age of 85.

== Writing career ==
Duncan was a prolific writer and penned over fifty books. His sixth book, West of January, won the 1990 Aurora award, an award he would win again in 2007 for Children of Chaos. He was a member of SF Canada and in 2015 he was inducted into the Canadian Science Fiction and Fantasy Hall of Fame.

Although Duncan usually wrote under his own name, some of his early books were published under the pseudonyms Ken Hood and Sarah B. Franklin.

== Bibliography ==
=== The Seventh Sword ===
A dying petrochemical plant manager named Wallie Smith is transferred from Earth into the body of a master swordsman in a pre-technological world by a goddess for her own purposes.

1. The Reluctant Swordsman (1988), ISBN 0-345-35291-2
2. The Coming of Wisdom (1988), ISBN 0-345-35292-0
3. The Destiny of the Sword (1988), ISBN 0-345-35293-9
4. The Death of Nnanji (2012), ISBN 1-61756-778-7

=== Pandemia ===
==== A Man of His Word ====
1. Magic Casement (1990), ISBN 0-345-36628-X
2. Faery Lands Forlorn (1991), ISBN 0-345-36629-8
3. Perilous Seas (1991), ISBN 0-345-36630-1
4. Emperor and Clown (1992), ISBN 0-345-36631-X

As mentioned in the forewords, these titles are based on an excerpt from the 1819 poem "Ode to a Nightingale" by John Keats.

The voice I hear this passing night was heard
In ancient days by emperor and clown:
Perhaps the self-same song that found a path
Through the sad heart of Ruth, when sick for home,
She stood in tears amid the alien corn;
The same that oft-times hath
Charm'd magic casements, opening on the foam
Of perilous seas, in faery lands forlorn.

==== A Handful of Men ====
1. The Cutting Edge (1992), ISBN 0-345-37896-2
2. Upland Outlaws (1993), ISBN 0-345-37897-0
3. The Stricken Field (1993), ISBN 0-345-37898-9
4. The Living God (1994), ISBN 0-345-37899-7

As mentioned in the forewords, these titles are based on an excerpt from the 1902 poem "To-Morrow" by John Masefield.

Oh yesterday the cutting edge drank thirstily and deep,
The upland outlaws ringed us in and herded us as sheep,
They drove us from the stricken field and bayed us into keep;
But tomorrow,
By the living God, we'll try the game again!

=== Omar ===
1. The Reaver Road (1992), ISBN 0-345-37481-9
2. The Hunters' Haunt (1995), ISBN 0-345-38459-8

=== The Great Game ===
1. Past Imperative (1995), ISBN 0-380-78129-8
2. Present Tense (1996), ISBN 0-380-78130-1
3. Future Indefinite (1997), ISBN 0-380-78131-X

=== The Years of Longdirk ===
Published using the pseudonym Ken Hood:

1. Demon Sword (1995), ISBN 0-06-105410-0
2. Demon Rider (1997), ISBN 0-06-105758-4
3. Demon Knight (1998), ISBN 0-06-105759-2

=== The King's Blades ===
==== Tales of the King's Blades ====
1. The Gilded Chain (1998), ISBN 0-380-97460-6
2. Lord of the Fire Lands (1999), ISBN 0-380-97461-4
3. Sky of Swords (2000), ISBN 0-380-97462-2

==== Chronicles of the King's Blades ====
1. Paragon Lost (2002), ISBN 0-380-81835-3
2. Impossible Odds (2003), ISBN 0-380-81834-5
3. The Jaguar Knights (2004), ISBN 0-06-055511-4
4. One Velvet Glove (2017), ISBN 978-1988274324
5. The Ethical Swordsman (2019), ISBN 978-1988274638

==== The King's Daggers ====
A series of young adult books set in the "King's Blades" world:

1. Sir Stalwart (1999), ISBN 0-380-80098-5
2. The Crooked House (2000), ISBN 0-380-80099-3
3. Silvercloak (2001), ISBN 0-380-80100-0

Omnibus edition of all three is titled The Monster War, ISBN 1497627087

=== Dodec ===
1. Children of Chaos (2006), ISBN 0-7653-1483-5
2. Mother of Lies (2007), ISBN 0-7653-1484-3

=== Nostradamus ===
1. The Alchemist's Apprentice (2007), ISBN 0-441-01575-1
2. The Alchemist's Code (2008), ISBN 0-441-01562-X
3. The Alchemist's Pursuit (2009), ISBN 978-0-441-01678-5

=== Brothers Magnus ===
1. Speak to the Devil (2010), ISBN 978-0-7653-2347-7
2. When the Saints (2011), ISBN 978-0-7653-2348-4

=== The Starfolk ===
1. King of Swords (2013), ISBN 147780739X
2. Queen of Stars (2014), ISBN 1477849173

=== Ivor of Glenbroch ===
A series of young adult short stories:

1. The Runner and the Wizard (2013), ISBN 1927400392
2. The Runner and the Saint (2014), ISBN 1927400538
3. The Runner and the Kelpie (2014), ISBN 1927400651

Omnibus edition of all three is titled The Adventures of Ivor, ISBN 1927400899

=== The Enchanter General ===
1. Ironfoot (2017)
2. Trial by Treason (2018)
3. Merlin Redux (2019)

=== Standalone novels ===
- A Rose-Red City (1987), ISBN 0-345-34098-1
- Shadow (1987), ISBN 0-345-34274-7
- West of January (1989), ISBN 0-345-35836-8
- Strings (1990), ISBN 0-345-36191-1
- Hero! (1991), ISBN 0-345-37179-8
- The Cursed (1995), ISBN 0-345-38951-4
- Daughter of Troy (1998; as Sarah B. Franklin), ISBN 0-380-79353-9
- Ill Met in the Arena (August 2008), ISBN 0-7653-1687-0
- Pock's World (October 2010), ISBN 1894063473
- Against the Light (January 2012), ISBN 1612182038
- Wildcatter (August 2012), ISBN 1894063902
- The Eye of Strife (April 2015), ISBN 1927400791
- Irona 700 (August 2015), ISBN 1504002180
- Eocene Station (August 2016), ISBN 978-1-9882-7405-8
- Portal of a Thousand Worlds (February 2017), ISBN 978-1-5040-3875-1
- Pillar of Darkness (January 2019), ISBN 978-1-9882-7457-7
- The Traitor's Son (May 2024), ISBN 978-1989398913
- Corridor to Nightmare (August 2024), ISBN 978-1989398937
