= William Howard Taft Charter High School =

Taft Charter High School

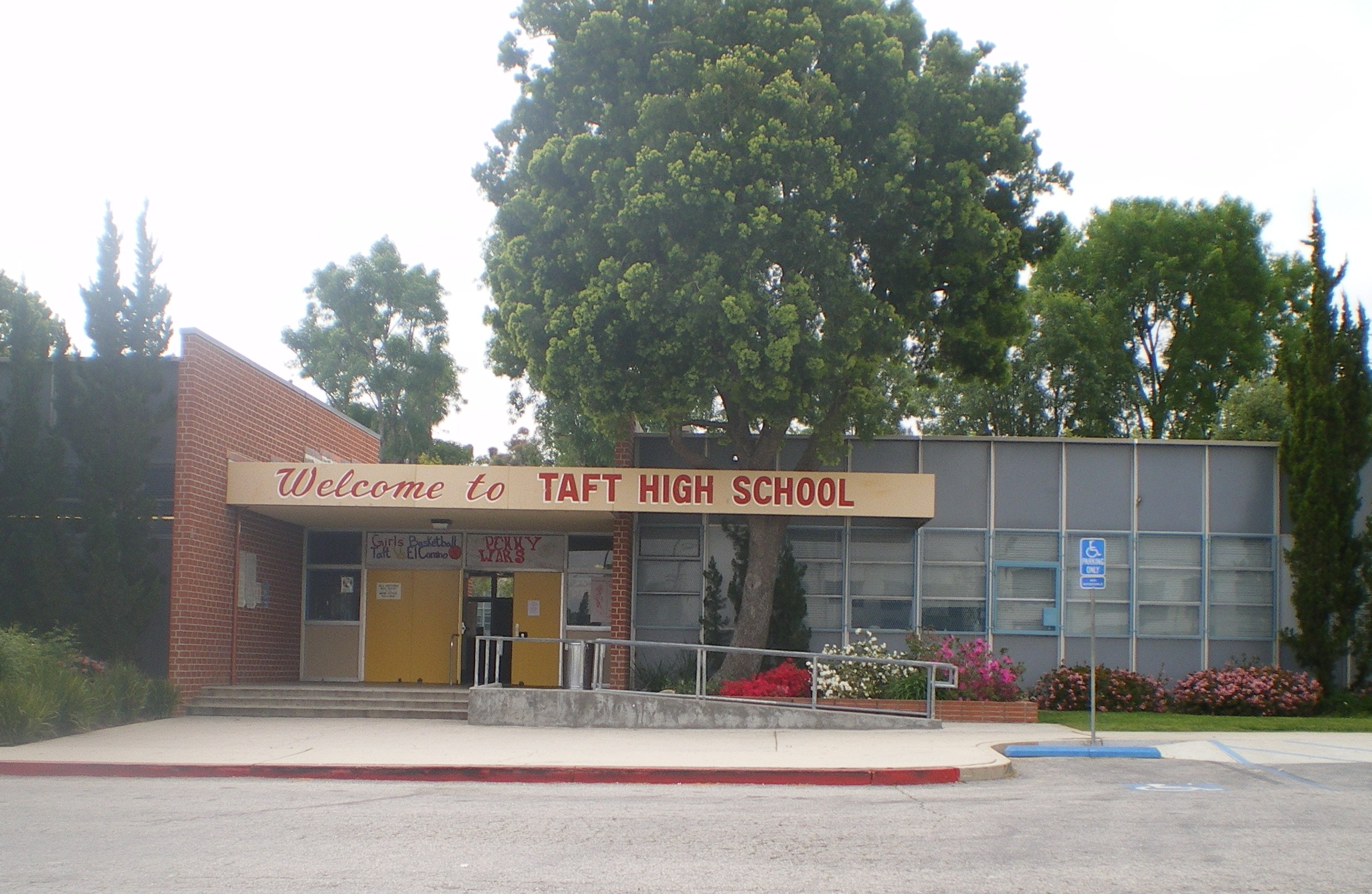

Location
- 5461 Winnetka Avenue; Woodland Hills, Los Angeles, California 91364; United States; 34.1689°N 118.5730°W

Information
- Type: Public
- Established: 1960
- Principal: Yun Yu
- Staff: 98.75 (FTE)
- Enrollment: 2,236 (2023–2024)
- Student to teacher ratio: 22.64
- Colors: Red, gold, and black
- Athletics conference: CIF Los Angeles City Section
- Nickname: Toreadors
- Newspaper: Taft Tribune
- Website: tafths.lausd.org

William Howard Taft Charter High School is a public school located on the corner of Ventura Boulevard and Winnetka Avenue in the Woodland Hills district of the San Fernando Valley in Los Angeles, California, within the Los Angeles Unified School District. The school gained affiliated charter status beginning with the 2013–2014 school year.

== History ==
Named after former U.S. president William Howard Taft, the school first opened in 1960. It was in the Los Angeles City High School District until 1961, when it merged into the Los Angeles Unified School District.

In the 2013–2014 school year, Taft High School became a charter school.

== Notable alumni ==
=== Sports ===
- Jeshua Anderson – track and field sprinter
- Rick Auerbach – MLB shortstop 1971–1981
- Mike Bercovici – college and pro football quarterback
- Mike Borzello – 5-time World Series champion. Chicago Cubs, Los Angeles Dodgers, New York Yankees
- Craig Buck – Olympic volleyball player
- Kihei Clark – NCAA champion basketball player at Virginia
- DeAndre Daniels – professional basketball player, college player at UConn
- Bryce Dejean-Jones – basketball shooting guard
- Larry Dierker – MLB pitcher, manager, broadcaster
- Spencer Dinwiddie – NBA guard for the Los Angeles Lakers
- Larry Drew II – basketball point guard
- Jordan Farmar – basketball point guard, 2-time NBA champion
- Jeff Fisher – former NFL player and Tennessee Titans coach 1995–2010, as well as the St. Louis/Los Angeles Rams 2012–2016
- Roy Foster – former NFL Pro Bowl offensive guard
- Guy Hansen – professional baseball pitcher and coach
- Steve Hartman – sportscaster
- Airabin Justin – NFL and CFL defensive back
- Gabe Kapler – former MLB outfielder and former San Francisco Giants manager, 2021 National League Manager of the Year, and general manager of the Miami Marlins of Major League Baseball
- Brad Kearns – professional triathlete, Guinness world record speedgolfer, The New York Times bestselling author
- Kevin Kennedy – MLB manager and radio-TV baseball commentator
- Pete LaCock – MLB first baseman and coach
- Kelly Paris – MLB third baseman
- DaShon Polk – NFL linebacker
- Paul Pratt – NFL defensive back for Detroit Lions
- Malcolm Smith – Super Bowl XLVIII champion and MVP
- Steve Smith – NFL wide receiver, Super Bowl XLII champion
- Jeff Stork – volleyball Hall of Famer, member of 1988 Summer Olympics gold-medal U.S. men's team
- Michael Thomas – NFL Pro Bowl wide receiver, New Orleans Saints
- Justin Tryon – NFL cornerback
- Duffy Waldorf – professional golfer, member of UCLA Sports Hall of Fame
- Taco Wallace – former NFL wide receiver
- Quincy Watts – athlete, winner of two gold medals at 1992 Summer Olympics
- Darrion Weems – NFL offensive tackle
- Antwaun Woods – nose tackle for the Dallas Cowboys, college Defensive Lineman of the Year in 2016
- Larry Yount – MLB pitcher
- Robin Yount – Baseball Hall of Fame player, 19 seasons with Milwaukee Brewers of MLB

=== Entertainment ===
- Steve Bartek – musician, Strawberry Alarm Clock, Oingo Boingo
- Matteo Barzini – Italian filmmaker
- Justine Bateman – actress, TV series Family Ties
- Phil Buckman – musician, actor, and voiceover artist, bass player for Filter
- Eazy-E – rapper, West Coast hip hop
- Adam Eget – podcaster, presenter and former talent coordinator at The Comedy Store
- Everlast – rapper/singer House of Pain
- William Finnegan – Pulitzer Prize-winning writer surfing essayist
- Char Fontane – actress and singer
- Barry Green – orchestral and solo double bass player and teacher
- Ice Cube – rapper, actor, director, producer, Friday, Are We There Yet?, Straight Outta Compton
- O'Shea Jackson Jr. – actor, rapper and songwriter
- Dave Koz – smooth jazz saxophonist, radio personality
- Lisa Kudrow – actress, TV series Friends
- Dale Launer – comedy screenwriter
- Ken Levine – Emmy-winning comedy writer, screenwriter, radio announce and play-by-play commentator
- Epic Mazur – vocalist, rapper, and record producer
- Maureen McCormick – actress, TV series The Brady Bunch
- Danny Boy O’Connor – rapper, House of Pain
- Susan Olsen – actress, TV series The Brady Bunch
- Dana Plato – actress, TV series Diff'rent Strokes
- Jordan Roberts – Academy Award-winning screenwriter
- Jan Smithers – actress, TV series WKRP in Cincinnati
- Mark Tulin – musician, founding member of The Electric Prunes
- Wilmer Valderrama – actor, TV series That '70s Show
- Holly Beth Vincent – musician, member of Holly and the Italians
- Jane Wiedlin – musician, singer and original member of band The Go-Go's
- Brad Wilk – drummer for Rage Against the Machine, Audioslave
- Robin Wright – actress, The Princess Bride, Forrest Gump, House of Cards, Wonder Woman

=== Politics ===
- Sandra Black – member of Barack Obama's Council of Economic Advisers
- Scott Bloch – Office of Special Counsel

=== Other ===
- Orlando "Baby Lane" Anderson – suspected gunman in the 1996 murder of Tupac Shakur
- Elliot Rodger – mass murderer responsible for murdering six people during the 2014 Isla Vista killings
- Kathryn Dwyer Sullivan – NASA Space Shuttle astronaut

== In popular culture ==
A handful of films and TV shows have been filmed at Taft. The 1976 film The Boy in the Plastic Bubble was filmed at the high school, as well as the films Mask (1985), The Brady Bunch Movie (1995), Crazy, Stupid, Love (2011), The Amazing Spider-Man (2012), The Prom (2020), and the television series Never Have I Ever (2020).
