= Joanne Ritchie =

Canadian triathlete

Personal information
- Born: Kelowna, British Columbia, Canada

Sport
- Sport: Triathlon
Medal record
Women's Triathlon
Representing Canada
ITU World Championships
| Gold medal – first place | 1991 Gold Coast | Elite |
| Silver medal – second place | 1992 Huntsville | Elite |
| Bronze medal – third place | 1993 Manchester | Elite |
ITU World Cup
| Gold medal – first place | 1993 | Overall |
| Silver medal – second place | 1992 | Overall |

Joanne "Jo-Anne" Ritchie (born in Kelowna, British Columbia) is a retired triathlete from Canada.

In 2026, Ritchie was inducted into the World Triathlon Hall of Fame. In 1991, she was the previous triathlon world champion.
