= Murder of Johnathon Robert Madden =

2003 child murder in Canada

Johnathon Robert Madden (11 May 1991 – 25 November 2003) was a 12-year-old Canadian boy whose gruesome murder at the hands of his 16-year-old brother Kevin Madden and his brother's friend Timothy Ferriman provoked widespread revulsion and outrage in Johnathon's home city of Toronto and across Canada.

The ensuing trials of Madden and Ferriman created a media sensation in Toronto and in the Canadian English media generally, which intensified after the first trial ended in a mistrial when a key witness was discovered to have committed perjury.

Madden and Ferriman were convicted, respectively, of first-degree murder and manslaughter in early 2006, but until September 29, 2006, when Justice David McCombs elected to sentence the youths as adults, the names of the principals in the case were precluded from publication by provisions of Canada's Youth Criminal Justice Act.

== Death ==
On the afternoon of November 25, 2003, Kevin Madden (then 16) was at home, accompanied by Timothy Ferriman and another friend, who remains publicly unidentified. The three began to extensively vandalize the family home, smashing beer bottles and a television with baseball bats, while drinking wine. Less than an hour before attacking Johnathon, who was also at home, all three spoke on the telephone to Ferriman's girlfriend indicating that a mass murder would occur; she tape-recorded this conversation.

Shortly thereafter, Kevin Madden attacked Johnathon with a butcher knife, cutting his face and neck 71 times, and severing his voice box and his carotid artery. Though present, Ferriman did not stab Johnathon himself but encouraged Kevin and handed him the knife, and afterwards helped to move Johnathon's body.

Following Johnathon's death, the boys hid his body in a basement crawl space. Together, the three awaited Kevin's and Johnathon's stepfather, Ralston Champagnie, who was coming home from work. When Champagnie arrived, he was attacked with a baseball bat and knife, but managed to escape from the house.

Johnathon's body was retrieved later that evening. All three boys were arrested within 24 hours of the incident.

== Court cases ==
=== First court case ===
The first court case relied on Ferriman's girlfriend as the Crown's key witness. It ended in a mistrial after she apparently perjured herself.

She made several posts on the site vampirefreaks.com indicating an interest in vampirism, which contradicted earlier court testimony.

=== Second court case ===
During the second case, Kevin Madden stated that "people who did not know Johnathon should not be concerned about what happened to him"

The verdict for the second court case was delivered on 27 February 2006. The jury determined that Kevin Madden was guilty of first-degree murder for his role in Johnathon's death, and guilty of attempted murder for his attack on his stepfather, Champagnie. Ferriman was found guilty of manslaughter for assisting in Johnathon's death. The third boy, who remains unidentified, was acquitted.

In the sentencing hearing on 29 September 2006, Justice David McCombs determined that Madden and Ferriman should be sentenced as adults, which permitted their identities, and those of the rest of Madden's family, to be published for the first time.

Both Madden's and Ferriman's lawyers indicated they were displeased that their clients were not sentenced as youths. Speaking of Madden, who had expressed no remorse or emotion in response to his actions throughout the trials, his lawyer said "Kevin desperately needs treatment, and unfortunately he's not going to get it. We could have had 10 years of in-depth treatment in the youth system and he's not going to get it." Ferriman's lawyer indicated he would appeal the decision, while Madden's lawyer said he was considering it.

In the sentencing hearing, Ferriman addressed the court and apologized for what he had done. His remorse enabled him to serve his sentence in a youth facility.

== Aftermath ==
Following the release of information after the publication ban was lifted, Joanne Champagnie, mother of Johnathon and Kevin Madden, launched a website dedicated to Johnathon's memory.
