= Ben Bright =

New Zealand triathlete (born 1974)

Benjamin Clifford Bright, also known as Ben Bright, was born on 12 July 1974 in Waiuku, New Zealand. He is the head coach for GB Triathlon, an olympic coach and a former athlete.

== Athletic career ==
Bright won Le Race, a 100 kilometres (62 mi) road bicycle race in Canterbury, New Zealand, in early 2000. He competed at the first Olympic triathlon at the 2000 Summer Olympics in Sydney, Australia. He ended up finishing in thirty-eighth place with a total time of 1:52:17.26.

== Coaching ==
Later on, Bright became a coach of Mantas, a local swim club in Hong Kong. After training several outstanding swimmers, including an Olympian and Hong Kong age group record breakers, he accepted an opportunity to coach a triathlon at Loughborough University in England.

Bright is now the head coach for the British Triathlon High Performance centre in Loughborough. He was personal coach to Tim Don and Hollie Avil at the 2008 Olympics.
