= Colleen Cannon =

American triathlete

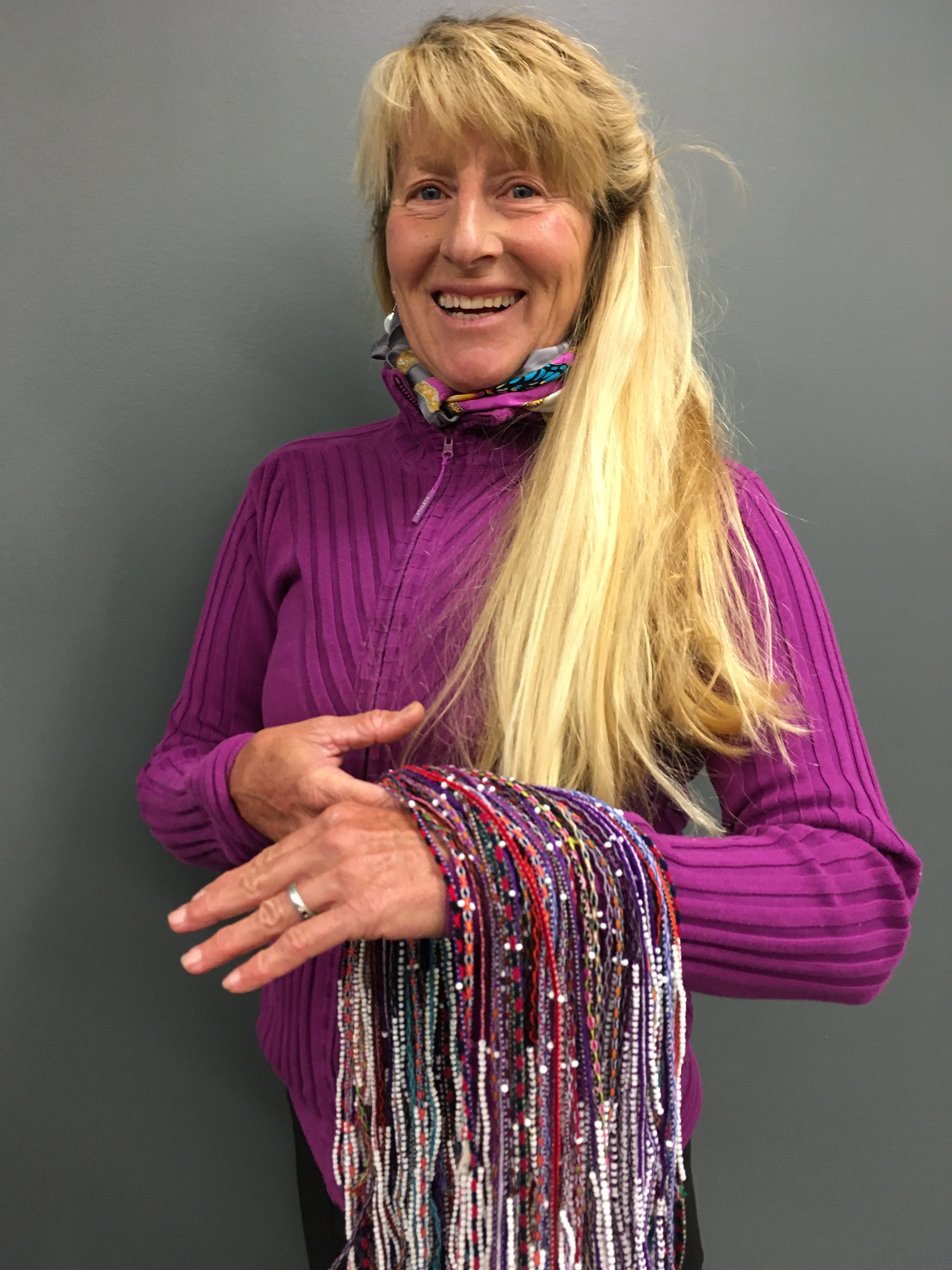
Colleen Cannon

Colleen Cannon (born 1960) is a female pioneer of the sport of triathlon, competing from 1981-1992 and winning multiple races including the World Triathlon Championship in 1984. After she retired from competition, she formed a women’s adventure retreat company called Women's Quest, which focuses on exercise and outdoor activities to empower women.

== Early life ==
Colleen Cannon was born in 1960 and grew up in Terre Haute, Indiana and later Alabama. She was the seventh of eight children in an active family.

Cannon was first exposed to running and biking through her love of horses and her lack of transportation. She learned to sprint and bike long distances when she would go to and from the stables. Cannon was always a swimmer. Starting at the age of five her mother would take her swimming at the local country club. She started competitively swimming with the Amateur Athletic Union in Indiana and continued in college.

== Education and career ==
Cannon graduated from Auburn University with a degree in health, physical education and recreation with a minor in math. While in college she was given scholarships for both swimming and track. While swimming for Auburn, she trained with Rowdy Gaines, Bill Forrester, and David McCagg who were later Olympic athletes.

Cannon "unintentionally" competed in her first triathlon in 1981 in Oxford, Maryland, thinking it was a "walkathon" fundraiser. Despite entering the race on a one-speed cruiser bike with baskets loaded with groceries and taking several picnic stops along the route, she finished second in the women's competition. She went on to win the World Championship in Nice, France in 1984 and two national championships in 1988 and 1990.

Athletic achievements

- 1983: Winner, United States triathlon series at New York
- 1984: World Triathlon Champion
- 1985: Winner, Eagleman Triathlon
- 1986: Winner, Orange County Performing Arts Center Triathlon
- 1987: Winner, Orange County Performing Arts Center Triathlon
- 1987: Winner, Coke Red Jersey
- 1987: 2nd place, Stroh's Chicago Triathlon
- 1988: Winner, Orange County Performing Arts Center Triathlon
- 1988: U.S. Triathlon Champion
- 1989: Winner, Coca Cola Grand Prix of Triathlon
- 1990: U.S. Triathlon Champion

Cannon was a member of the U.S. National Triathlon Team between 1990 and 1992, as well as a top-ranked triathlete of the Association of Professional Triathletes in 1984, 1986, and 1987.

Cannon was inducted into the Jackson County (Alabama) Sports Hall of Fame in 2015 and the Boulder (Colorado) Sports Hall of Fame in 2017.

Cannon has been a spokeswoman for Tri for the Cure.

== Later career ==
In 1992 Cannon had an encounter with a native Hopi Indian tribe where she was told "women will save the planet." At that point, she realized that she was meant to do more than be a triathlete. She soon went on to start her own women's retreat organization called Women's Quest--"a quest to find the most beautiful and empowered self that you can be. A spirit filled journey." Women’s Quest organizes retreats around the world for women “to renew the spirit and strengthen the body” as well as to “create vibrant health and personal empowerment.”

== Personal life ==
Cannon is married to Howard Kaushansky. She first came to Boulder, Colorado in 1983 to work with Diane Israel. She relocated to the area in 1986 where she has lived ever since and has helped create the burgeoning triathlon community there.
