= Oscar Galíndez =

Argentinean triathlete

Personal information
- Born: June 5, 1971 (age 55) Río Tercero, Córdoba, Argentina

Sport
- Sport: Triathlon
Medal record
Men's Triathlon
Representing Argentina
Pan American Games
Bronze medal – third place	1995 Mar del Plata	Individual
Bronze medal – third place	2003 Santo Domingo	Individual
Duathlon World Championship
Gold medal – first place	1995 Cancun	Elite Individual
Ironman World Championship 70.3
Silver medal – second place	2007 Clearwater	Elite Individual

Oscar Saul Galíndez (born June 5, 1971) is an Argentinian triathlete. He competed in the first Olympic triathlon at the 2000 Summer Olympics, obtaining the twenty-eighth place with a total time of 1:50:59.48.

Galíndez began in triathlon at the age of 16. He soon was able to win the Hexa-championship "Trofeu Brasil de Triatlo" and Duathlon World Championship. In 1995, Galíndez moved to Brazil, as Brazilian training and racing conditions were better than those in Argentina.

Following his participation in the 2000 Olympics, Galíndez began preparation for longer-distance races, such as the Ironman.

Oscar is the creator and founder of the sportswear brand OG Design.

In the Pan American Games, he won the bronze medal in triathlon in both 1995 and 2003. In addition, he won the gold medal in the 1995 Duathlon World Championship and the silver medal in the 2007 Ironman World Championship.

Galíndez was awarded Best Athlete for the Argentinian province of Córdoba in 1994, and was declared one of the top 100 Argentinian athletes of all time by the Konex Foundation in 2010.
