= Greg Welch =

Australian triathlete

Medal record

Men's triathlon

Representing Australia

ITU World Championships
Gold medal – first place	1990 Orlando	Elite

ITU Long Distance World Championships
Gold medal – first place	1996 Muncie	Elite

ITU World Cup
Silver medal – second place	1991	Overall

Ironman World Championship
Gold medal – first place	1994	Elite
Silver medal – second place	1991	Elite
Bronze medal – third place	1989	Elite
Bronze medal – third place	1996	Elite

Men's duathlon

ITU World Championships
Gold medal – first place	1993 Arlington	Elite

Gregory John Welch OAM (born in 1964 in Campsie, Sydney), known as Greg Welch, is an Australian triathlete. He is known for having won "The Grand Slam", which includes the ITU Triathlon World Championships (1990), The Ironman World Championship (1994), the ITU Duathlon World Championships (1993) and the World Triathlon Long Distance Championships (1996). Greg was an ambassador to the UNHCR (United Nations High Commissioner for Refugees) in 2000.

Due to his being diagnosed with ventricular tachycardia, he has undergone nine open-heart surgeries from 2001 until 2003 and has retired from sports. He maintains contact with triathlon through his work as an advisor, coach and commentator with the World Triathlon Corporation.

He is married to fellow Ironman triathlete Sian Welch.
