= Melissa Mantak =

Melissa Mantak (born 1962) is a triathlete and triathlon coach from the United States. In 2010, she was named USA Triathlon's National Coach of the Year.

== Biography ==
Mantak completed a master's degree in sport sciences at the University of Denver. She completed her first triathlon in 1984, while at university. She competed professionally as a triathlete then in 2006 started her own coaching business. In 2007, she was appointed head coach to the United States triathlon team for International Triathlon Union World Cup races.
