= Béatrice Mouthon =

French triathlete

Béatrice Mouthon (born 14 June 1966 in Annecy) is an athlete from France, who competes in triathlon.

Mouthon competed at the first Olympic triathlon at the 2000 Summer Olympics. She took thirty-fifth place with a total time of 2:11:08.08. Her split times were 21:15.48 for the swim, 1:09:03.90 for the cycling, and 0:40:48.70 for the run.

Her twin sister, Isabelle Mouthon-Michellys, also competed in the 2000 Olympic triathlon.
