= Brad Kearns =

American triathlete (born 1965)

Personal information
- Born: February 4, 1965 (age 61) Los Angeles, California, U.S.

Sport
- Country: United States
- Sport: Triathlon (1986-1995) Track&field (2005-present); Speed golf (2014-2021)

Brad Kearns (born February 4, 1965) is an American author, podcast host, masters track&field high jumper and sprinter, and former professional triathlete. Kearns performed on the international triathlon circuit from 1986 to 1995 and won 31 events worldwide. He reached a top-3 world ranking in masters track and field in the high jump for age 55–59 in 2020, 2022, and 2024, with a silver medal in the 2024 USA National Masters Championships (1.55m). He reached a top-10 USA ranking in the 400 meters in 2024 (1:02). He is a five-time top-20 finisher in the World Speedgolf Championships. In 2018, Kearns broke the Guinness World Record for the fastest single hole of golf ever played (minimum length, 500 yards).

== Athletic career ==
Kearns on his way to winning the Eilat international triathlon, 1991

Kearns' start in endurance sports was at Taft High School in Woodland Hills, California, where he ran cross country and track from 1980 to 1982. He was a finalist at the National Junior Olympics Track & Field Championships 1500 meters at age 16, winning his semi-final heat in 4:06, and achieving a national ranking of 12th in his age division. He placed 5th in the Los Angeles City Cross Country Championships in 1981, setting a school record of 15:24 on the Pierce College course that held for nearly 20 years, and still ranks in the top 60 all-time LA City section performances as of 2015. In track and field, he set a Los Angeles City Cee Division (i.e. - Frosh/Soph) record, winning the 1600 meter title in 1981 in 4.26.05. As a senior in 1982, Kearns placed 4th in the Los Angeles City section 1600 meters in 4:23, coming from 50 meters behind the pack on the final lap to take the final qualifying spot for the California state high school championships. He placed 9th in the state final 1600 meter race in a time of 4:20.

Kearns graduated from UC Santa Barbara with a B.A., cum laude, in business/economics in 1985. In 1982, as a freshman on the varsity cross country team, he placed 37th in the Pacific Coast Athletic Association cross country championships at Woodward Park in Fresno. His running career at UCSB was riddled with injuries and illness, leading him to embark on triathlon efforts. In his first year of cycling on the UCSB club team, Kearns was California Collegiate Cycling Association state champion in the Novice B division in the 10-mile time trial with a time of 24:27.

After an 11-week stint at the KPMG accounting firm in downtown Los Angeles, Kearns decided to pursue a career on the professional triathlon circuit. Over nine years on the professional circuit, career highlights include wins at the 1991 National Bud Light USTS Series/Coke Grand Prix Championship, the 1991 USA Triathlon National Sprint Championship, the 1991 International Triathlon Union Pan-American Championship, a streak of seven consecutive wins in 1991-1992 and a year-end #3 world-ranking in 1991.

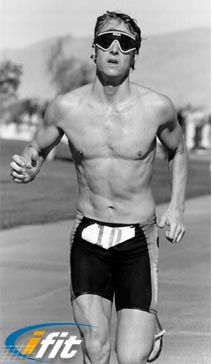
Kearns en route to November, 1986 Desert Princess victory; some multisport experts call it the greatest upset of all time

In November, 1986, as an unranked rookie professional, Kearns upset world's #1 duathlete Kenny Souza and world #1 ranked triathlete Scott Molina at the inaugural Desert Princess World Championship Series Run-Bike-Run event (10k-62k-10k), with a time of 2:44. Six weeks later, Kearns beat his nearest competitor by five minutes, in a time of 2:38:47. At the final race in the series in February, 1987, Kearns placed 4th to claim the first Duathlon World Championship Series title. At this event he became the first athlete in history to use aerodynamic handlebars in a multisport event, debuting a handcrafted Scott DH handlebar from inventor Boone Lennon. In moving from 27th place to 4th place during the 62k bike segment, many competitors were availed a glimpse at the aerodynamic advantage provided by the DH bars, and they soon became popular on the circuit.

Over the seasons of 1990 and 1991, Kearns had 15 first-place finishes at major races and 33 top-5 finishes. In world championship competition, he placed 5th at the long course championships in Nice, France (1988), 6th at the Olympic distance world championship in Kelowna, B.C. (1988) and 5th at the ITU Olympic distance world championships in Muskoka, Ontario (1992). Over the ensuing 28 years, Kearns has been the last USA athlete to place top-5 at ITU Olympic distance worlds. In 1991, Kearns won the ITU World Cup/Pan American Championship event at Olympic distance (1.5k-40k-10k) in Ixtapa, Mexico by a record margin of five minutes. In 1993, Kearns won the richest sprint distance triathlon in the history of triathlon, the DCA Atlanta event (1k-20k-5k), earning $11,750 in the 51-minute race.

== Later athletic career ==
Kearns is a competitor in masters track&field, specializing in the high jump and the 400 meters.
High Jump: In 2020, 2022, and 2024, he reached a #1 ranking in the US and top-3 world ranking in the men's age 55-59 category. In July 2024, Kearns placed second in the high jump at the USA Master's National Track&Field Championships in Sacramento (there were 3 competitors), with a clearance of 5 ft 1 in (1.55 m)
400 Meters: In 2024, Kearns reached won the Southern California Masters Championship at 400 meters in the Men's age 55-59 division with a time of 1:02.81. He placed 5th at the USA Masters Indoor Championships and 6th at the Outdoor Championships in the men's 55-59 400 meters

Kearns is a four-time top-20 finisher in the World Professional Speedgolf Championships. In Speedgolf tournaments, competitors run through the round at high speed, carrying only a handful of clubs. Both minutes and strokes are added together to achieve a Speedgolf total score. Kearns was a professional competitor in the late 1990s, placing 8th in the 1996 World "Extreme Golf" Championships in San Diego. In 2014, he returned to professional competition for the first time in 18 years. He placed 20th in the 2014 World Speedgolf Championships at Bandon Dunes, Oregon, shooting 83 in 51 minutes for a Speedgolf score of 134.12. In 2015, Kearns repeated his 20th-place finish in the professional division of the World Speedgolf Championships on Oct 19–20 at the Glen Club in Chicago, IL. His 36-hole score was 289. In 2016, Kearns placed 19th in the professional division of the World Speedgolf Championships on Oct 17–18 at the Glen Club in Chicago, IL.

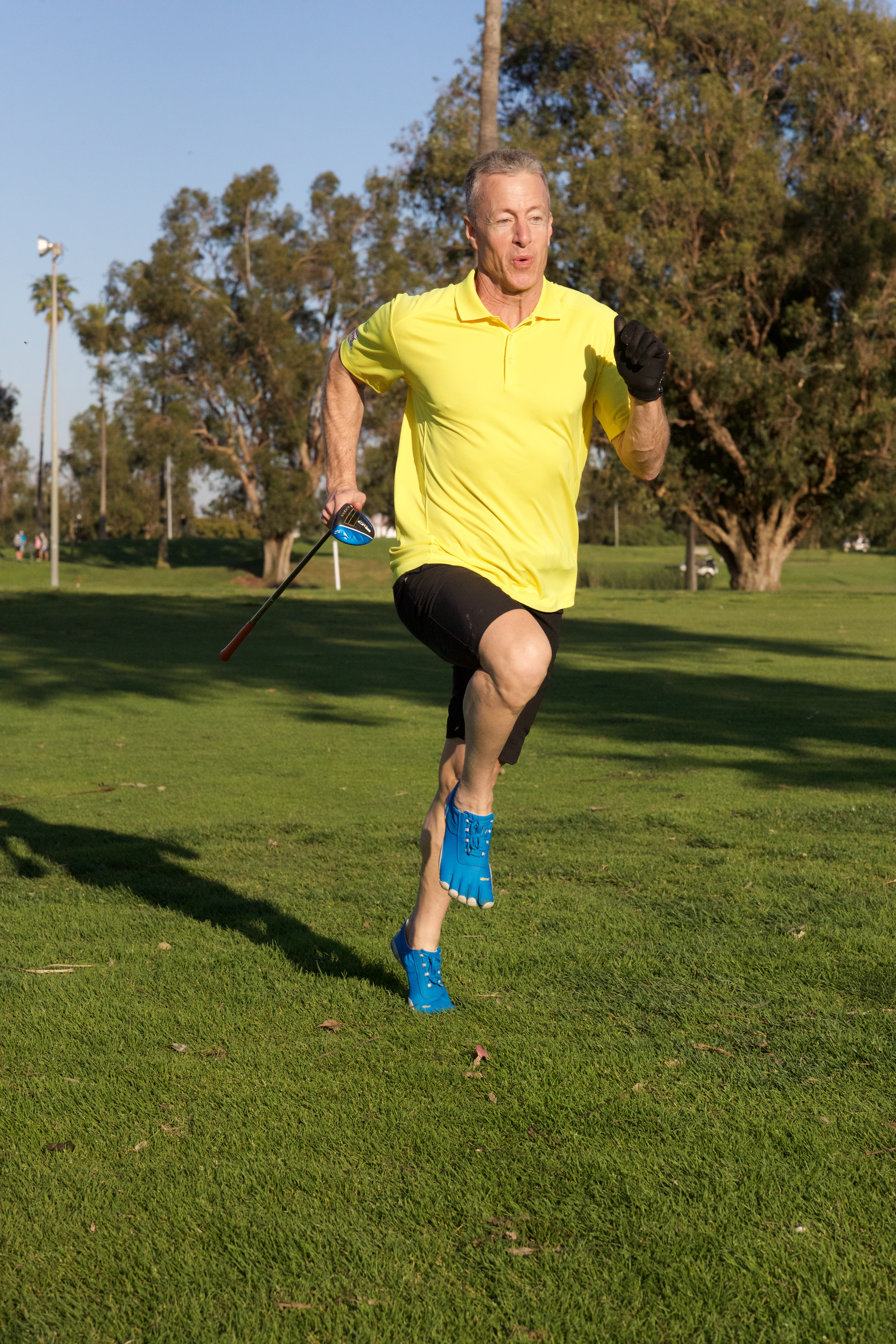
Kearns practicing for the Speedgolf single-hole Guinness World Record, where he carries only a 3-wood for all shots

In 2018, Kearns twice broke the Guinness World Record for the fastest single hole of golf ever played by an individual (minimum hole length of 500 yards.) On May 8, 2018, at the Bing Maloney Golf Course in Sacramento, CA, Kearns played the 503-yard ninth hole in one minute, 40.24 seconds, taking ten seconds off of the previous record held by Steve Jeffs of England. On June 1, 2018, at the Woodley Lakes Golf Course in Van Nuys, CA, Kearns played the 503-yard fourth hole in one minute, 38.75 seconds. Using only a single club, a 3-wood, Kearns scored a birdie four on the par-5-hole, sprinting full speed between shots.

== Publishing and coaching ==
Kearns has self-published several books and written three published by McGraw-Hill: Breakthrough Triathlon Training (2005) ISBN 0071462791, How Lance Does It (2006) ISBN 0071477403, and How Tiger Does It ISBN 0071545646. Kearns created and produced the Auburn Triathlon in Auburn, for 11 years. He was the founder and executive director of a kids fitness program called Running School, for elementary schools in Northern California and Nevada.

Since 2008, Kearns has worked with Mark Sisson to create the Primal Blueprint books and evolutionary-based diet, exercise and lifestyle movement. In 2012, Kearns did a 22-city tour across America deliver the Primal Blueprint Transformation Seminar. From 2010 to 2014, Kearns was the director of 9 PrimalCon healthy lifestyle retreats in cities across North America. He and Sisson co-authored the book Primal Endurance in 2016, The Keto Reset Diet in 2017, Keto For Life in 2020, and Two Meals A Day in 2021. The Keto Reset Diet became a New York Times bestseller in October 2017, reached #4 in its non-fiction category, and briefly ranked as the #1 bestselling book overall on amazon.com.

Kearns hosts the B.rad Podcast, covering health, fitness, peak performance, happiness, and longevity.
