= Leandro Macedo =

Brazilian triathlete (born 1968)

Personal information
- Born: March 18, 1968 (age 58)
Medal record
Men's Triathlon
Representing Brazil
Pan American Games
| Gold medal – first place | 1995 Mar del Plata | Individual |
South American Games
| Gold medal – first place | 2002 Rio de Janeiro | Individual |
ITU World Championships
| Bronze medal – third place | 1996 Cleveland | Individual |
ITU World Cup
| Gold medal – first place | 1991 | Overall |

Leandro Corrieri de Macedo (born March 18, 1968, in Porto Alegre, Rio Grande do Sul) is an athlete from Brazil, who competes in triathlon. He won the inaugural event at the 1995 Pan American Games in Mar del Plata.

Macedo competed at the first Olympic triathlon at the 2000 Summer Olympics. He took fourteenth place with a total time of 1:49:50.69.

Four years later, at the 2004 Summer Olympics, Macedo competed again. He placed thirty-first with a time of 1:57:39.36.
