= Karen Smyers =

American triathlete (born 1961)

Personal information
- Born: September 1, 1961 (age 64) Corry, Pennsylvania, United States

Sport
- Sport: Triathlon
Medal record
Women's Triathlon
Representing the United States
Ironman World Championships
Gold medal – first place	1995	Individual
Silver medal – second place	1994	Individual
Silver medal – second place	1999	Individual
Pan American Games
Gold medal – first place	1995 Mar del Plata	Individual
ITU World Championships
Gold medal – first place	1990 Orlando	Individual
Gold medal – first place	1995 Cancún	Individual
Silver medal – second place	1993 Manchester	Individual
ITU World Cup
Gold medal – first place	1991	Overall
US Pro Nationals
Gold medal – first place	1990	Individual
Gold medal – first place	1991	Individual
Gold medal – first place	1992	Individual
Gold medal – first place	1993	Individual
Gold medal – first place	1994	Individual
Gold medal – first place	1995	Individual

Karen Smyers (born September 1, 1961) is a triathlete from the United States. She was the 1990 and 1995 ITU Triathlon World Champion, and was also the 1995 Ironman World Champion. She was inducted into the Triathlon Hall of Fame in January 2009.

== Early life ==
Born on September 1, 1961 in Corry, Pennsylvania, Smyers "had a prestigious high school and college athletic career before becoming a professional triathlete," according to The Times Leader. She "was the captain of her high school swim team and made All-State in the sport." She was also the captain of her high school gymnastics team.

== Career ==
Smyers was employed as a computer programmer and consultant during the 1980s. In 1987 and 1988, she resided in Somerville, Massachusetts and finished seventh and third, respectively, in the Greater Wilkes-Barre Triathlon in Wilkes-Barre, Pennsylvania. In 1988, she also secured her fourth consecutive victory in the Bay State Triathlon in New England.

Smyers won the 1990 and 1995 ITU World Triathlon Series and the Ironman World Championship in 1995. In January 2009, she was inducted into the Triathlon Hall of Fame.

Smyers resided in Lincoln, Massachusetts in 1995.

== Illness ==
Smyers was diagnosed with thyroid cancer in 1999.
