= 2015 Ironman 70.3 World Championship =

International triathlon competition

Ironman 70.3 World Championship
- Location: Zell am See-Kaprun, Austria
- Date: August 30, 2015

Champions
- Men: (Germany) Jan Frodeno
- Women: (Switzerland) Daniela Ryf

The 2015 Ironman 70.3 World Championship was a triathlon competition that was held in Zell am See-Kaprun, Austria on August 30, 2015. It was won by Jan Frodeno of Germany and Daniela Ryf of Switzerland. The championship was organized by the World Triathlon Corporation (WTC) and was the culmination of the Ironman 70.3 series of events that occurred from August 3, 2014 through July 12, 2015. Athletes, both professional and amateur, earned a spot in the championship race by qualifying in races throughout the 70.3 series. A prize purse of $250,000 will be distributed to the top 10 male and female professional athletes. The race marked the second year of the championship event being held in a non-recurring location and the first time being held in Europe.

== Championship results ==
=== Men ===
Pos.	Time (h:mm:ss)	Name	Country	Split times (h:mm:ss)				
Pos.	Time (h:mm:ss)	Name	Country	Swim	T1	Bike	T2	Run
Gold medal	3:51:19	Jan Frodeno	Germany	22:14	2:03	2:09:04	1:26	1:16:32
Silver medal	3:52:48	Sebastian Kienle	Germany	24:04	2:03	2:09:54	1:25	1:15:22
Bronze medal	3:55:05	Javier Gómez	Spain	22:12	2:04	2:13:38	1:36	1:15:35
4	3:56:28	Bart Aernouts	Belgium	25:38	2:06	2:12:07	1:42	1:14:55
5	3:56:34	Michael Raelert	Germany	22:15	2:10	2:13:19	1:33	1:17:17
6	3:56:52	Andreas Böcherer	Germany	22:12	2:16	2:09:00	1:40	1:21:44
7	3:57:47	Jan Van Berkel	Switzerland	22:27	2:03	2:13:15	1:28	1:18:34
8	3:58:44	Tyler Butterfield	Bermuda	24:05	1:58	2:13:48	1:34	1:17:19
9	3:58:58	Andreas Dreitz	Germany	23:04	2:06	2:07:35	1:36	1:24:37
10	4:00:11	Albert Molins	Spain	24:30	2:22	2:14:32	1:49	1:16:58

=== Women ===
Pos.	Time (h:mm:ss)	Name	Country	Split times (h:mm:ss)				
Pos.	Time (h:mm:ss)	Name	Country	Swim	T1	Bike	T2	Run
Gold medal	4:11:34	Daniela Ryf	Switzerland	23:46	2:03	2:21:10	1:26	1:22:51
Silver medal	4:23:07	Heather Wurtele	Canada	26:33	2:03	2:27:39	1:25	1:24:56
Bronze medal	4:24:10	Anja Beranek	Germany	24:32	2:04	2:24:18	1:36	1:31:17
4	4:25:33	Magali Tisseyre	Canada	24:55	2:06	2:27:56	1:42	1:28:45
5	4:27:39	Alicia Kaye	United States	24:03	2:10	2:28:58	1:33	1:30:35
6	4:29:53	Julia Gajer	Germany	24:46	2:16	2:33:06	1:40	1:27:33
7	4:30:31	Susie Cheetham	United Kingdom	26:34	2:03	2:34:52	1:28	1:25:01
8	4:30:47	Ricarda Lisk	Germany	24:03	1:58	2:35:38	1:34	1:27:14
9	4:31:00	Lauren Barnett	United States	26:36	2:06	2:32:18	1:36	1:27:52
10	4:31:47	Emma Bilham	Switzerland	24:52	2:22	2:32:38	1:49	1:30:24

With Ryf's win she became the first female to win back-to-back Ironman 70.3 championship titles. Former champions Jodie Swallow and Meredith Kessler both exited the race early. Swallow pulled out after the swim after suffering a bike crash the previous day. Kessler experienced mechanical issues on the bike.

== Qualification ==
The 2015 Ironman 70.3 Series featured 71 events that enabled qualification to the 2015 World Championship event. Professional triathletes qualified for the championship race by competing in races during the qualifying period, earning points towards their pro rankings. For the 2015 championship race that period was August 3, 2014 to July 12, 2015. An athlete’s five highest scoring races are counted toward their pro rankings. The top 50 males and top 35 females in the pro rankings qualified for the championship race. The previous five 70.3 champions receive an automatic qualifying spot provided they validate their entry by competitively finishing one qualifying race. Winners of the five regional 70.3 championships will also automatically qualify for the championship race. These winners did not count towards the final 50 and 35 qualifiers Professional athletes were also eligible for prize purses at each qualifying event, which ranged in total size from $75,000 to $100,000.

Amateur triathletes could qualify for the championship race by earning a qualifying slot at one of the qualifying events. At qualifying events, slots were allocated to each age group category, male and female, with the number of slots given out based on that category's proportional representation of the overall field. Each age group category was tentatively allocated one qualifying spot in each qualifying event. In previous years some 70.3 events also served as qualifiers for the full Ironman World Championships in Hawaii. However, the 2014 qualifying year served as the final year for almost all qualifying races in this capacity. As such this year's qualifying season only the handcycle competitions and Ironman 70.3 Kraichgau will offer qualification into the 2015 Ironman World Championship. This was to accommodate for the increased number of qualifying slots created from the newly added full Ironman events.

=== Non-point races ===
Prior to the 2014 Ironman Boulder race, World Triathlon Corporation's CEO, Andrew Messick, announced a redistribution of prize money to help facilitate paying ten professionals deep at each race as well as awarding larger prize purses at select races across Ironman and Ironman 70.3. As part of this initiative, WTC eliminated points and prize purses for professional triathletes initially at 9 Ironman events and 11 Ironman 70.3 events in 2015, mostly occurring within North America. There are nine Ironman 70.3 races with no professional points or prize purse offered for the 2015 Ironman 70.3 Championship qualifying period.

=== Qualifying Ironman 70.3 events ===
Date	Event	Location
Aug 3, 2014	Ironman 70.3 Philippines	Cebu, Philippines
Aug 10, 2014	Ironman 70.3 Steelhead	(United States) Benton Harbor, Michigan
Aug 10, 2014	Ironman 70.3 European Pro Championship	Wiesbaden, Germany
Aug 17, 2014	Ironman 70.3 Lake Stevens	(United States) Lake Stevens, Washington
Aug 17, 2014	Ironman 70.3 Timberman	(United States) Gilford, New Hampshire
Aug 23, 2014	Ironman 70.3 Budapest	Budapest, Hungary
Aug 30, 2014	Ironman 70.3 Foz do Iguaçu	Foz do Iguaçu, Brazil
Aug 31, 2014	Ironman 70.3 Zell am See	|Zell am See-Kaprun, Austria
Sep 7, 2014	Ironman 70.3 World Championship	(Canada) Mont-Tremblant, Quebec
Sep 7, 2014	Ironman 70.3 Muskoka	(Canada) Huntsville, Ontario
Sep 14, 2014	Ironman 70.3 Sunshine Coast	(Australia) Sunshine Coast, Queensland
Sep 14, 2014	Ironman 70.3 Rügen	Rügen, Germany
Sep 14, 2014	Ironman 70.3 Kronberg^{X}	Elsinore, Denmark
Sep 20, 2014	Ironman 70.3 Lanzarote	Lanzarote, Spain
Sep 21, 2014	Ironman 70.3 Princeton	(United States) Princeton, New Jersey
Sep 21, 2014	Ironman 70.3 Cozumel	Cozumel, Mexico
Sep 21, 2014	Ironman 70.3 Lake Tahoe*	(United States) Lake Tahoe, California
Sep 28, 2014	Ironman 70.3 Augusta	(United States) Augusta, Georgia
Oct 4, 2014	Ironman 70.3 Gurye Korea	(South Korea) Gurye, Korea
Oct 5, 2014	Ironman 70.3 Silverman	(United States) Henderson, Nevada
Oct 19, 2014	Ironman 70.3 Port MacQuarie	(Australia) Port Macquarie, New South Wales
Oct 26, 2014	Ironman 70.3 Miami	(United States) Miami, Florida
Oct 26, 2014	Ironman 70.3 Austin	(United States) Austin, Texas
Nov 2, 2014	Ironman 70.3 Taiwan	Hengchun, Taiwan
Nov 9, 2014	Ironman 70.3 Australian Pro Championship	Mandurah, Western Australia
Nov 16, 2014	Ironman 70.3 Ballarat	(Australia) Ballarat, Victoria
Nov 30, 2014	Ironman 70.3 Western Sydney	(Australia) Sydney, New South Wales
Jan 11, 2015	Ironman 70.3 Pucón	Pucón, Chile
Jan 18, 2015	Ironman 70.3 Asia Pacific Pro Championship	Auckland, New Zealand
Jan 25, 2015	Ironman 70.3 South Africa	Buffalo City, South Africa
Feb 8, 2015	Ironman 70.3 Geelong	(Australia) Geelong, Victoria
Mar 8, 2015	Ironman 70.3 Subic Bay	Subic Bay, Philippines
Mar 15, 2015	Ironman 70.3 Puerto Rico	San Juan, Puerto Rico
Mar 16, 2015	Ironman 70.3 Monterrey	Monterrey, Mexico
Mar 28, 2015	Ironman 70.3 California	(United States) Oceanside, California
Apr 5, 2015	Ironman 70.3 Latin American Pro Championship	Brasília, Brazil
Apr 5, 2015	Ironman 70.3 Putrajaya	Putrajaya, Malaysia
Apr 12, 2015	Ironman 70.3 Florida^{X}	(United States) Haines City, Florida
Apr 19, 2015	Ironman 70.3 New Orleans	(United States) New Orleans, Louisiana
Apr 26, 2015	Ironman 70.3 Texas	(United States) Galveston, Texas
May 2, 2015	Ironman 70.3 North American Pro Championship	(United States) St. George, Utah
May 2, 2015	Ironman 70.3 Busselton	Busselton, Western Australia
May 3, 2015	Ironman 70.3 St Croix	(United States Virgin Islands) Saint Croix, U.S. Virgin Islands
May 3, 2015	Ironman 70.3 Pays d'Aix	Aix-en-Provence, France
May 9, 2015	Ironman 70.3 Mallorca	Alcudia, Mallorca, Spain
May 10, 2015	Ironman 70.3 Vietnam	Da Nang, Vietnam
May 17, 2015	Ironman 70.3 Austria	St. Pölten/Vienna, Austria
May 17, 2015	Ironman 70.3 Barcelona	Barcelona, Spain
May 17, 2015	Ironman 70.3 Chattanooga	(United States) Chattanooga, Tennessee
May 30, 2015	Ironman 70.3 Hawaii^{X}	(United States) Kohala, Hawaii
May 31, 2015	Ironman 70.3 Raleigh	(United States) Raleigh, North Carolina
Jun 7, 2015	Ironman 70.3 Japan	Tokoname, Aichi, Japan
Jun 7, 2015	Ironman 70.3 Switzerland	Rapperswil-Jona, Switzerland
Jun 7, 2015	Ironman 70.3 Kraichgau^{†}	Kraichgau, Germany
Jun 13, 2015	Ironman 70.3 Boulder	(United States) Boulder, Colorado
Jun 13, 2015	Ironman 70.3 Boise^{X}	(United States) Boise, Idaho
Jun 14, 2015	Ironman 70.3 Italy	Pescara, Italy
Jun 14, 2015	Ironman 70.3 Eagleman	(United States) Cambridge, Maryland
Jun 14, 2015	Ironman 70.3 Cairns	(Australia) Cairns, Queensland
Jun 14, 2015	Ironman 70.3 Staffordshire	Staffordshire, England
Jun 14, 2015	Ironman 70.3 Victoria^{X}	(Canada) Victoria, British Columbia
Jun 20, 2015	Ironman 70.3 Luxembourg^{‡}	Luxembourg
Jun 21, 2015	Ironman 70.3 Kronberg^{X}	Elsinore, Denmark
Jun 21, 2015	Ironman 70.3 Syracuse^{X}	(United States) Syracuse, New York
Jun 21, 2015	Ironman 70.3 Mont Tremblant	(Canada) Mont-Tremblant, Quebec
Jun 28, 2015	Ironman 70.3 UK^{X}	(United States) Wimbleball, Exmoor, UK
Jun 28, 2015	Ironman 70.3 Buffalo Springs Lake^{‡}	(United States) Lubbock, Texas
Jul 5, 2015	Ironman 70.3 Incheon Korea	(South Korea) Incheon, Korea
Jul 5, 2015	Ironman 70.3 Norway	Haugesund, Norway
Jul 5, 2015	Ironman 70.3 Muskoka	(Canada) Huntsville, Ontario
Jul 11, 2015	Ironman 70.3 Muncie^{X}	(United States) Muncie, Indiana
Jul 12, 2015	Ironman 70.3 Vineman	(United States) Sonoma County, California

*Ironman 70.3 Lake Tahoe was canceled due to smoke from the King Fire.
^{†}Also serves as a 2014 Ironman World Championship qualifier.
^{‡}Also serves as the handcycle championships and as 2015 Ironman World Championship handcycle qualifier
^{X}No professional points awarded.

=== Qualifying pro men ===
Qualifying slots into the championship race were awarded to the top 50 men in points. Slots that were not accepted by an athlete were rolled down to the next highest eligible qualifier in points.

Awarded slots are according to Ironman.com as of August 31, 2015 and final race results.

Championship participants
Points rank	Name	Country	Races	Points total
1	Tim Don	(United Kingdom)	5	6820
2	Tim Reed	(Australia)	5	5790
4	Jan Frodeno	(Germany)	3	4200
5	Javier Gómez^{†}	(Spain)	2	3750
6	Michael Raelert^{†}	(Germany)	5	3503
7	Bart Aernouts	(Belgium)	3	3475
8	Leon Griffin	(Australia)	5	3395
11	Sam Appleton	(Australia)	5	3075
12	Terenzo Bozzone	(New Zealand)	5	3070
18	Joe Gambles	(Australia)	2	2410
19	Nils Frommhold	(Germany)	2	2370
22	Ruedi Wild	(Switzerland)	3	2205
24	Jesse Thomas	(United States)	4	2125
26	Kevin Collington	(United States)	5	2040
27	Chris Leiferman	(United States)	5	1955
31	Manuel Küng	(Switzerland)	5	1885
32	Cody Beals	(Canada)	5	1740
33	Maurice Clavel	(Germany)	2	1725
35	Markus Thomschke	(Germany)	4	1680
38	Andi Böcherer	(Germany)	3	1640
39	Andreas Dreitz	(Germany)	3	1625
40	Benjamin Collins	(United States)	3	1590
41	Tyler Butterfield	(Bermuda)	3	1540
48	Patrick Lange	(Germany)	4	1305
49	Fabio Carvalho	(Brazil)	3	1295
54	Alberto Casadei^{*}	(Italy)	4	1208
56	Justin Metzler^{*}	(United States)	5	1195
57	Taylor Reid^{*}	(Canada)	5	1180
58	Jan Van Berkel^{*}	(Switzerland)	4	1180
59	Paul Reitmayr^{*}	(Austria)	4	1175
62	Sebastian Neef^{*}	(Germany)	4	1130
65	Matt Trautman^{*}	(South Africa)	2	1070
66	Stuart Marais^{*}	(South Africa)	3	1042
69	Sebastian Kienle^{†}	(Germany)	2	1015
70	James Seear^{*}	(Australia)	5	1010
71	Ritchie Nicholls^{*}	(United Kingdom)	2	990
84	Albert Molins^{*}	(Spain)	3	790
95	Alexander Schilling^{*}	(Germany)	4	660
100	Matthias Knossalla^{*}	(Germany)	3	635
103	Evert Scheltinga^{*}	(Netherlands)	5	594
111	Andrew Starykowicz^{*}	(United States)	1	540
119	Arturo Garza^{*}	(Mexico)	3	486
120	Frédéric Limousin^{*}	(France)	4	485
121	Jonathan Ciavattella^{*}	(Italy)	2	480
123	Antony Costes^{*}	(France)	3	475
^{†}Previous champion qualifier.^{*}Additional roll down slot awarded.

Qualified but not participating
Points rank	Name	Country	Races	Points total
3	Lionel Sanders	(Canada)	5	4725
9	Craig Alexander^{†}	(Australia)	5	3335
10	Brent McMahon	(Canada)	5	3315
13	Richie Cunningham	(Australia)	5	2965
14	Matt Chrabot	(United States)	5	2760
15	Igor Amorelli	(Brazil)	5	2585
16	Andy Potts	(United States)	5	2475
17	Ben Hoffman	(United States)	5	2445
20	Mark Bowstead	(New Zealand)	5	2360
21	Christian Kemp	(Australia)	5	2280
23	Josh Amberger	(Australia)	5	2125
25	Will Clarke	(United Kingdom)	3	2100
28	Luke Bell	(Australia)	5	1945
29	Mario de Elias	(Argentina)	5	1945
30	Cameron Brown	(New Zealand)	3	1905
34	Timothy O'Donnell	(United States)	2	1710
36	Callum Millward	(New Zealand)	4	1680
37	Drew Scott	(United States)	5	1645
42	Brad Kahlefeldt	(Australia)	3	1510
43	Viktor Zyemtsev	(Ukraine)	3	1440
44	Santiago Ascenço	(Brazil)	2	1425
45	Alex Reithmeier	(Australia)	5	1380
47	Andreas Raelert	(Germany)	2	1325
46	David McNamee	(United Kingdom)	3	1360
50	Peter Robertson	(Australia)	1	1275
51	Courtney Atkinson	(Australia)	2	1250
52	Ronnie Schildknecht	(Switzerland)	4	1240
53	Paul Ambrose	(Australia)	5	1215

=== Qualifying pro women ===
Qualifying slots were awarded to the top 35 women in points. Slots that were not accepted by an athlete were rolled down to the next highest eligible qualifier in points.

Awarded slots are according to Ironman.com as of August 31, 2015 and final race results.

Championship participants
Points rank	Name	Country	Races	Points total
1	Meredith Kessler	(United States)	5	6460
2	Daniela Ryf	(Switzerland)	4	5750
3	Heather Wurtele	(Canada)	4	5320
4	Jodie Swallow^{†}	(United Kingdom)	4	4880
6	Magali Tisseyre	(Canada)	5	3805
7	Radka Vodickova	(Czech Republic)	4	3700
9	Alicia Kaye	(United States)	5	3075
10	Anja Beranek	(Germany)	5	2925
12	Susie Cheetham	(United Kingdom)	4	2760
13	Camilla Pedersen	(Denmark)	4	2740
23	Svenja Bazlen	(Germany)	3	2085
24	Lauren Barnett	(United States)	5	2030
26	Kristin Möeller	(Germany)	5	1965
29	Parys Edwards	(United Kingdom)	4	1900
31	Alexandra Tondeur	(Belgium)	5	1855
32	Kirsty Jahn	(Canada)	5	1795
34	Katy Duffield	(Australia)	5	1780
35	Julia Gajer	(Germany)	3	1780
44	Emma-Kate Lidbury^{*}	(United Kingdom)	5	1505
46	Holly Lawrence^{*}	(United Kingdom)	3	1460
47	Sue Huse^{*}	(United States)	5	1420
48	Natascha Schmitt^{*}	(Germany)	5	1355
51	Ricarda Lisk^{*}	(Germany)	4	1280
54	Nikki Butterfield^{*}	(Bermuda)	2	1265
55	Eva Wutti^{*}	(Austria)	2	1250
59	Emma Bilham^{*}	(Switzerland)	3	1175
63	Erika Csomor^{*}	(Hungary)	5	1155
66	Lauren Brandon^{*}	(United States)	5	1055
69	Mareen Hufe^{*}	(Germany)	2	1040
74	Anna Halasz^{*}	(Hungary)	5	945
80	Tine Deckers^{*}	(Belgium)	2	870
^{†}Previous champion qualifier.^{*}Additional roll down slot awarded.

Qualified but not participating
Points rank	Name	Country	Races	Points total
5	Annabel Luxford	(Australia)	4	3810
8	Caroline Steffen	(Switzerland)	5	3525
11	Gina Crawford	(New Zealand)	4	2890
14	Liz Blatchford	(Australia)	4	2575
15	Heather Jackson	(United States)	4	2505
16	Helle Frederiksen	(Denmark)	3	2500
17	Mary Beth Ellis	(United States)	2	2470
18	Leanda Cave^{†}	(United Kingdom)	3	2460
19	Lauren Goss	(United States)	5	2430
20	Valentina Carvallo	(Chile)	5	2430
21	Laura Philipp	(Germany)	4	2150
22	Jackie Hering	(United States)	5	2105
25	Lisa Hütthaler	(Austria)	2	1995
27	Sarah Piampiano	(United States)	5	1960
28	Angela Naeth	(Canada)	4	1925
30	Sofie Goos	(Belgium)	3	1875
33	Lucy Gossage	(United Kingdom)	3	1790
36	Rachel Joyce	(United Kingdom)	3	1730
37	Melanie McQuaid	(Canada)	5	1680
