= 2014 Ironman 70.3 World Championship =

International triathlon competition

Ironman 70.3 World Championship
- Location: Mont-Tremblant, Quebec, Canada
- Date: September 7, 2014

Champions
- Men: (Spain) Javier Gomez
- Women: (Switzerland) Daniela Ryf

The 2014 Ironman 70.3 World Championship was a triathlon competition that was held in Mont-Tremblant, Quebec, Canada on September 7, 2014 and won by Javier Gomez of Spain and Daniela Ryf of Switzerland. The championship was organized by the World Triathlon Corporation (WTC) and was the culmination of the Ironman 70.3 series of events that occurred from August 16, 2013 through July 27, 2014. Athletes, both professional and amateur, earned a spot in the championship race by qualifying in races throughout the 70.3 series. A prize purse of $250,000 was distributed to the top 10 male and female professional athletes, a $50,000 increase from the previous year.

This was the first year of the championship event being held in a non-recurring location. Previously, the last eight annual races had been held in only two locations, the Las Vegas area for the prior three races, and Clearwater, Florida before that. In 2014, the championship race began changing locations each year.

== Championship results ==
=== Men ===
Pos.	Time (h:mm:ss)	Name	Country	Split times (h:mm:ss)				
Pos.	Time (h:mm:ss)	Name	Country	Swim	T1	Bike	T2	Run
Gold medal	3:41:30	Javier Gomez	Spain	22:09	2:44	2:06:18	0:54	1:09:27
Silver medal	3:42:11	Jan Frodeno	Germany	22:10	2:45	2:05:49	0:53	1:10:37
Bronze medal	3:44:38	Tim Don	Great Britain	22:41	2:53	2:05:18	1:03	1:12:45
4	3:46:03	Lionel Sanders	Canada	26:42	2:51	2:04:14	0:56	1:11:22
5	3:46:25	Nils Frommhold	Germany	22:39	2:57	2:05:11	0:54	1:14:45
6	3:46:34	Joe Gambles	Australia	22:58	2:52	2:04:55	0:56	1:14:56
7	3:47:07	Tim Reed	Australia	23:02	2:57	2:04:53	1:04	1:15:13
8	3:48:05	Bart Aernouts	Belgium	24:38	3:03	2:06:08	1:00	1:13:18
9	3:48:20	Terenzo Bozzone	New Zealand	23:02	2:46	2:05:01	0:47	1:16:47
10	3:48:44	Will Clarke	Great Britain	23:02	2:47	2:07:13	0:56	1:14:48

=== Women ===
Pos.	Time (h:mm:ss)	Name	Country	Split times (h:mm:ss)				
Pos.	Time (h:mm:ss)	Name	Country	Swim	T1	Bike	T2	Run
Gold medal	4:09:19	Daniela Ryf	Switzerland	24:04	3:10	2:16:46	0:50	1:24:31
Silver medal	4:11:43	Jodie Swallow	Great Britain	23:59	3:10	2:19:28	0:58	1:24:11
Bronze medal	4:14:55	Heather Wurtele	Canada	26:24	3:22	2:21:54	0:57	1:22:20
4	4:16:03	Meredith Kessler	United States	24:36	3:34	2:22:32	1:10	1:24:13
5	4:17:03	Mary Beth Ellis	United States	24:01	3:09	2:20:04	1:05	1:28:46
6	4:17:47	Radka Vodičková	Czech Republic	24:32	3:05	2:25:43	0:56	1:23:34
7	4:18:16	Lisa Hütthaler	Austria	26:26	3:08	2:25:25	0:55	1:22:24
8	4:18:48	Svenja Bazlen	Germany	24:34	3:16	2:25:35	0:54	1:24:31
9	4:19:52	Rachel McBride	Canada	26:33	3:24	2:22:30	0:47	1:26:40
10	4:20:38	Magali Tisseyre	Canada	24:37	3:08	2:25:32	0:52	1:26:31

== Qualification ==
The 2014 Ironman 70.3 Series featured 59 events that enabled qualification to the 2014 World Championship event. Professional triathletes qualified for the championship race by competing in races during the qualifying period, earning points towards their pro rankings. An athlete's five highest scoring races were counted toward their pro rankings. The top 50 males and top 35 females in the pro rankings qualified for the championship race. The previous five 70.3 champions, as well as last year's Ironman World Champions and Hy-Vee Triathlon winners received an automatic qualifying spot. Professional athletes were also eligible for prize purses at each qualifying event, which ranged in total size from $15,000 to $250,000.

Amateur triathletes could qualify for the championship race by earning a qualifying slot at one of the qualifying events. At qualifying events, slots were allocated to each age group category, male and female, with the number of slots given out based on that category's proportional representation of the overall field. Each age group category was tentatively allocated one qualifying spot in each qualifying event. Some 70.3 events also served as qualifiers for the full Ironman World Championships in Hawaii. However, the 2014 qualifying year would be the final year for the current five, non-hand cycle, qualifying races in this capacity. This was to accommodate for the increased number of qualifying slots created from the newly added full Ironman events.

=== Qualifying Ironman 70.3 events ===
Date	Event	Location
Aug 18, 2013	Ironman 70.3 Timberman	(United States) Gilford, New Hampshire
Aug 18, 2013	Ironman 70.3 Yeppoon	Yeppoon, Australia
Aug 24, 2013	Ironman 70.3 Brazil	Brasília, Brazil
Sep 1, 2013	Ironman 70.3 Zell am See-Kaprun	Kaprun, Austria
Sep 1, 2013	Ironman 70.3 Ireland	(Republic of Ireland) Galway, Ireland
Sep 8, 2013	Ironman 70.3 Luxembourg^{‡}	Luxembourg, Luxembourg
Sep 8, 2013	Ironman 70.3 Muskoka	Huntsville, Ontario, Canada
Sep 8, 2013	Ironman 70.3 World Championship	(United States) Las Vegas, Nevada
Sep 15, 2013	Ironman 70.3 Sunshine Coast	Sunshine Coast, Australia
Sep 22, 2013	Ironman 70.3 Pays d'Aix	Aix-en-Provence, France
Sep 22, 2013	Ironman 70.3 Cozumel	Cozumel, Mexico
Sep 29, 2013	Ironman 70.3 Augusta	(United States) Augusta, Georgia
Oct 5, 2013	Ironman 70.3 Lanzarote	Lanzarote, Spain
Oct 27, 2013	Ironman 70.3 Miami	(United States) Miami, Florida
Oct 27, 2013	Ironman 70.3 Austin	(United States) Austin, Texas
Nov 2, 2013	Ironman 70.3 Taiwan	Hengchun, Taiwan
Nov 10, 2013	Ironman 70.3 Australian Pro Championship^{†}	Mandurah, Australia
Nov 17, 2013	Ironman 70.3 Shepparton	Shepparton, Australia
Dec 15, 2013	Ironman 70.3 Canberra	Canberra, Australia
Jan 12, 2014	Ironman 70.3 Pucón	Pucón, Chile
Jan 19, 2014	Ironman 70.3 Asia-Pacific Championship^{†}	Auckland, New Zealand
Jan 26, 2014	Ironman 70.3 South Africa	Buffalo City, South Africa
Feb 9, 2014	Ironman 70.3 Geelong	Geelong, Australia
Feb 16, 2014	Ironman 70.3 Latin American Championship	Panama City, Panama
Mar 16, 2014	Ironman 70.3 Monterrey	Monterrey, Mexico
Mar 29, 2014	Ironman 70.3 California	(United States) Oceanside, California
Apr 6, 2014	Ironman 70.3 Brazil	Brasília, Brazil
Apr 6, 2014	Ironman 70.3 Texas	(United States) Galveston, Texas
Apr 13, 2014	Ironman 70.3 Putrajaya	Putrajaya, Malaysia
Apr 13, 2014	Ironman 70.3 Puerto Rico	San Juan, Puerto Rico
Apr 13, 2014	Ironman 70.3 Florida	(United States) Haines City, Florida
Apr 13, 2014	Ironman 70.3 New Orleans	(United States) New Orleans, Louisiana
May 3, 2014	Ironman 70.3 Busselton	Busselton, Australia
May 3, 2014	Ironman 70.3 U.S. Pro Championship	(United States) St. George, Utah
May 4, 2014	Ironman 70.3 St Croix^{†}	(United States Virgin Islands) Saint Croix, U.S. Virgin Islands
May 10, 2014	Ironman 70.3 Mallorca	Alcudia, Spain
May 18, 2014	Ironman 70.3 Pays d'Aix	Aix-en-Provence, France
May 25, 2014	Ironman 70.3 Austria	St. Pölten/Vienna, Austria
May 31, 2014	Ironman 70.3 Hawaii^{†}	(United States) Kohala, Hawaii
Jun 1, 2014	Ironman 70.3 Switzerland	Rapperswil-Jona, Switzerland
Jun 1, 2014	Ironman 70.3 Raleigh	(United States) Raleigh, North Carolina
Jun 1, 2014	Ironman 70.3 Japan	Tokoname Japan
Jun 7, 2014	Ironman 70.3 Boise	(United States) Boise, Idaho
Jun 8, 2014	Ironman 70.3 Cairns	Cairns, Australia
Jun 8, 2014	Ironman 70.3 Italy	Pescara, Italy
Jun 8, 2014	Ironman 70.3 Eagleman^{†}	(United States) Cambridge, Maryland
Jun 8, 2014	Ironman 70.3 Kansas	(United States) Lawrence, Kansas
Jun 15, 2014	Ironman 70.3 Boulder	(United States) Boulder, Colorado
Jun 15, 2014	Ironman 70.3 U.K.	Wimbleball Lake, United Kingdom
Jun 21, 2014	Ironman 70.3 Luxembourg	Luxembourg, Luxembourg
Jun 22, 2014	Ironman 70.3 Aarhus	Aarhus, Denmark
Jun 22, 2014	Ironman 70.3 Mont Tremblant	Mont-Tremblant, Canada
Jun 22, 2014	Ironman 70.3 Syracuse	(United States) Syracuse, New York
Jun 29, 2014	Ironman 70.3 Buffalo Springs Lake^{‡}	(United States) Lubbock, Texas
Jul 6, 2014	Ironman 70.3 Norway	Haugesund, Norway
Jul 12, 2014	Ironman 70.3 Muncie	(United States) Muncie, Indiana
Jul 13, 2014	Ironman 70.3 Vineman	(United States) Sonoma County, California
Jul 20, 2014	Ironman 70.3 Racine	(United States) Racine, Wisconsin
Jul 27, 2014	Ironman 70.3 Calgary	Calgary, Canada

^{†}Also serves as a 2014 Ironman World Championship qualifier.
^{‡}Also serves as the handcycle championships and as 2014 Ironman World Championship handcycle qualifier

The Ironman 70.3 Berlin race, scheduled to take place on July 13, 2014, was canceled on April 30, 2014. Ironman cited that the race licensee, SCC Events, was unable to get the city of Berlin to approve a bike course route.

=== Qualifying pro men ===
Qualifying slots into the championship race were awarded to the top 50 men in points. Slots that were not accepted by an athlete were rolled down to the next highest eligible qualifier in points.

Championship participants
Points rank	Name	Country	Races	Points total
1	Terenzo Bozzone	(New Zealand)	5	6675
3	Tim Reed	(Australia)	5	4785
4	Sebastian Kienle^{†}	(Germany)	4	4545
5	Joe Gambles	(Australia)	4	4535
6	Tim Don	(United Kingdom)	5	3865
7	Jan Frodeno	(Germany)	3	3750
9	Richie Cunningham	(Australia)	5	3635
10	Will Clarke	(United Kingdom)	5	3585
11	Leon Griffin	(Australia)	5	3530
12	Andrew Starykowicz	(United States)	5	3245
13	Brad Kahlefeldt	(Australia)	5	3215
14	Kevin Collington	(United States)	5	3065
15	Matt Chrabot	(United States)	5	3035
16	Samuel Appleton	(Australia)	5	2995
17	Tim Van Berkel	(Australia)	5	2810
18	Brent Mcmahon	(Canada)	5	2745
19	Lionel Sanders	(Canada)	5	2550
20	Callum Millward	(New Zealand)	5	2235
21	Ruedi Wild	(Switzerland)	4	2170
22	Jeremy Jurkiewicz	(France)	3	2070
23	Ben Hoffman	(United States)	5	2040
24	Trevor Wurtele	(Canada)	5	1985
26	Igor Amorelli	(Brazil)	4	1940
27	Andreas Dreitz	(Germany)	5	1940
28	Filip Ospalý	(Czech Republic)	3	1890
30	Josh Amberger	(Australia)	5	1820
31	Bevan Docherty	(New Zealand)	3	1675
32	Nils Frommhold	(Germany)	4	1660
35	James Cunnama	(South Africa)	3	1510
36	Javier Gómez^{†}	(Spain)	1	1500
37	Craig Alexander^{†}	(Australia)	3	1460
38	Clayton Fettell	(Australia)	3	1325
40	Albert Moreno	(Spain)	5	1290
41	Stuart Marais	(South Africa)	4	1275
42	Ben Collins	(United States)	5	1265
43	James Seear	(Australia)	5	1265
45	Alex Reithmeier	(Australia)	5	1245
47	Boris Stein	(Germany)	3	1195
48	Bart Aernouts	(Belgium)	3	1190
49	Domenico Passuello	(Italy)	4	1180
51	John Polson	(Australia)	5	1150
52	Iván Raña	(Spain)	3	1130
53	Jesse Thomas	(United States)	4	1109
56	Jordan Rapp^{*}	(United States)	5	1075
61	Peter Robertson^{*}	(Australia)	3	995
65	Patrick Lange^{*}	(Germany)	4	910
69	Ronnie Schildknecht^{*}	(Switzerland)	2	880
77	Johannes Moldan^{*}	(Germany)	5	750
79	Andreas Raelert^{*}	(Germany)	2	720
87	Victor Debil-Caux^{*}	(France)	5	635
^{†}Previous champion qualifier.^{*}Additional roll down slot awarded.

Qualified but declined participation
Points rank	Name	Country	Races	Points total
2	Andy Potts	(United States)	5	4860
8	Timothy O'Donnell	(United States)	5	3745
25	Casey Munro	(Australia)	5	1970
29	Bertrand Billard	(France)	3	1825
33	Victor Morales	(Spain)	4	1565
34	Paul Matthews	(Australia)	5	1530
39	Tyler Butterfield	(Bermuda)	1	1290
44	Marino Vanhoenacker	(Belgium)	3	1250
46	Axel Zeebroek	(Belgium)	3	1220
50	Todd Skipworth	(Australia)	3	1160
173	Frederik Van Lierde^{†}	(Belgium)	1	240
^{†}Previous champion qualifier

=== Qualifying pro women ===
Qualifying slots were awarded to the top 35 women in points. Slots that were not accepted by an athlete were rolled down to the next highest eligible qualifier in points.

Championship participants
Points rank	Name	Country	Races	Points total
1	Melissa Hauschildt^{†}	(Australia)	5	6640
2	Annabel Luxford	(Australia)	4	5730
3	Catriona Morrison	(United Kingdom)	4	5600
4	Heather Wurtele	(Canada)	5	4500
5	Heather Jackson	(United States)	3	4260
6	Svenja Bazlen	(Germany)	3	3595
7	Lisa Hütthaler	(Austria)	4	3345
8	Meredith Kessler	(United States)	4	3290
9	Jodie Swallow^{†}	(United Kingdom)	4	3210
10	Daniela Ryf	(Switzerland)	3	2810
11	Helle Frederiksen	(Denmark)	4	2780
12	Radka Vodickova	(Czech Republic)	4	2770
15	Angela Naeth	(Canada)	4	2610
17	Melanie McQuaid	(Canada)	5	2440
18	Margaret Shapiro	(United States)	5	2440
20	Rachel McBride	(Canada)	5	2380
21	Susie Hignett	(United Kingdom)	5	2370
22	Ruth Brennan Morrey	(United States)	5	2140
27	Valentina Carvallo	(Chile)	5	1930
28	Laura Bennett	(United States)	5	1930
29	Emma-Kate Lidbury	(United Kingdom)	5	1910
32	Camilla Pedersen	(Denmark)	3	1750
33	Mary Beth Ellis	(United States)	3	1740
35	Lauren Barnett	(United States)	4	1680
44	Amber Ferreira^{*}	(United States)	5	1405
47	Magali Tisseyre^{*}	(Canada)	4	1350
51	Laura Siddall^{*}	(United Kingdom)	4	1215
53	Hallie Blunck^{*}	(United States)	4	1140
57	Lisa Mensink^{*}	(Canada)	3	985
62	Rebeccah Wassner^{*}	(Australia)	3	880
63	Astrid Ganzow^{*}	(Germany)	3	870
84	Andrea Forrest^{*}	(Australia)	2	640
^{†}Previous champion qualifier.^{*}Additional roll down slot awarded.

Qualified but declined participation
Points rank	Name	Country	Races	Points total
13	Amanda Stevens	(United States)	5	2650
14	Gina Crawford	(New Zealand)	5	2645
16	Rebekah Keat	(Australia)	5	2560
19	Lisa Marangon	(Australia)	5	2415
23	Leanda Cave^{†}	(United Kingdom)	4	2075
24	Sophie Goos	(Belgium)	4	2040
25	Rebecca Hoschke	(Australia)	4	2030
26	Caitlin Snow	(United States)	4	2025
30	Amy Marsh	(United States)	4	1815
31	Sarah Piampiano	(United States)	5	1760
34	Mirinda Carfrae^{†}	(Australia)	3	1685
36	Julie Dibens^{†}	(United Kingdom)	3	1620
37	Candice Hammond	(New Zealand)	3	1615
38	Kate Bevilaqua	(Australia)	5	1560
39	Mandy Mclane	(United States)	5	1550
^{†}Previous champion qualifier
