= 2013 Ironman 70.3 World Championship =

International triathlon competition

Ironman 70.3 World Championship
- Location: Henderson, Nevada
- Date: September 8, 2013

Champions
- Men: (Germany) Sebastian Kienle
- Women: (Australia) Melissa Hauschildt

The 2013 Ironman 70.3 World Championship was a triathlon competition that was held at Lake Las Vegas in Henderson, Nevada on September 8, 2013. The event was won by German Sebastian Kienle and Australian Melissa Hauschildt. The championship was organized by the World Triathlon Corporation (WTC) and was the culmination of the Ironman 70.3 series of events that occurred from August 19, 2012 through August 11, 2013. Athletes, both professional and amateur, earned a spot in the championship race by qualifying in races throughout the 70.3 series.

This was the final year of the championship event being held in the Las Vegas area. In 2014, the championship race will begin changing locations each year. This is in contrast to having an annual recurring championship in one location as in the past with Las Vegas and Clearwater, Florida. The annual Las Vegas race will remain in place for 2014 but will be renamed the Ironman 70.3 Silverman.

== Championship results ==
=== Men ===
Pos.	Time (h:mm:ss)	Name	Country	Split times (h:mm:ss)				
Pos.	Time (h:mm:ss)	Name	Country	Swim	T1	Bike	T2	Run
Gold medal	3:54:02	Sebastian Kienle	Germany	25:38	2:27	2:10:10	0:57	1:14:50
Silver medal	3:56:06	Terenzo Bozzone	New Zealand	24:36	2:20	2:14:31	1:01	1:13:38
Bronze medal	3:56:55	Joe Gambles	United States	24:48	2:29	2:14:06	1:03	1:14:29
4	3:57:36	Andy Potts	United States	23:25	2:26	2:15:11	1:08	1:15:26
5	3:57:42	Tim Reed	Australia	24:47	2:25	2:14:15	1:08	1:15:07
6	3:57:48	Kevin Collington	United States	23:50	2:30	2:15:27	1:03	1:14:58
7	3:58:17	Leon Griffin	Australia	24:58	2:25	2:14:12	1:05	1:15:35
8	3:59:36	Timothy O'Donnell	United States	23:33	2:22	2:16:11	0:57	1:16:32
9	3:59:42	Tyler Butterfield	Bermuda	24:43	2:23	2:14:19	1:18	1:16:59
10	3:59:56	Will Clarke	United Kingdom	24:38	2:24	2:14:35	1:20	1:16:59

=== Women ===
Pos.	Time (h:mm:ss)	Name	Country	Split times (h:mm:ss)				
Pos.	Time (h:mm:ss)	Name	Country	Swim	T1	Bike	T2	Run
Gold medal	4:20:07	Melissa Hauschildt	Australia	29:19	2:49	2:25:08	1:14	1:21:37
Silver medal	4:25:19	Heather Jackson	United States	30:08	2:32	2:28:48	0:56	1:22:55
Bronze medal	4:25:59	Annabel Luxford	Australia	25:59	2:52	2:28:38	1:06	1:27:24
4	4:27:50	Catriona Morrison	Great Britain	30:07	3:06	2:31:32	1:16	1:21:49
5	4:27:52	Svenja Bazlen	Germany	27:16	2:42	2:28:32	1:15	1:28:07
6	4:28:46	Daniela Ryf	Switzerland	28:31	2:49	2:28:48	1:08	1:27:30
7	4:29:58	Lisa Hütthaler	Austria	28:30	2:56	2:30:51	1:08	1:26:33
8	4:31:44	Lisa Nordén	Sweden	27:15	3:01	2:31:10	1:12	1:29:06
9	4:32:30	Kelly Williamson	United States	26:14	2:35	2:40:16	1:12	1:22:13
10	4:33:11	Heather Wurtele	Canada	28:36	2:57	2:34:51	1:14	1:25:33

== Qualification ==
The 2013 Ironman 70.3 Series featured 61 events that enabled qualification to the 2013 World Championship event. Professional triathletes qualified for the championship race by competing in races during the qualifying period, earning points towards their pro rankings. An athlete’s five highest scoring races were counted toward their pro rankings. The top 50 males and top 35 females in the pro rankings qualified for the championship race. Professional athletes were also eligible for prize purses at each qualifying event, which ranged in total size from $15,000 to $200,000.

Amateur triathletes could qualify for the championship race by earning a qualifying slot at one of the qualifying events. At qualifying events, slots were allocated to each age group category, male and female, with the number of slots given out based on that category's proportional representation of the overall field. Each age group category would be tentatively allocated one qualifying spot in each qualifying event. Some 70.3 events also served as qualifiers for the full Ironman World Championships in Hawaii.

=== Qualifying Ironman 70.3 events ===
Date	Event	Location
Aug 19, 2012	Ironman 70.3 Yeppoon	(Australia) Yeppoon, Queensland
Aug 19, 2012	Ironman 70.3 Timberman	(United States) Gilford, New Hampshire
Aug 19, 2012	Ironman 70.3 Steelhead	(United States) Benton Harbor, Michigan
Aug 25, 2012	Ironman 70.3 Brazil	Penha, Brazil
Aug 26, 2012	Ironman 70.3 Salzburg	Salzburg, Austria
Sep 2, 2012	Ironman 70.3 Ireland	(Republic of Ireland) Galway, Ireland
Sep 9, 2012	Ironman 70.3 World Championship	(United States) Las Vegas, Nevada
Sep 9, 2012	Ironman 70.3 Muskoka	Huntsville, Ontario, Canada
Sep 23, 2012	Ironman 70.3 Cozumel	Cozumel, Mexico
Sep 23, 2012	Ironman 70.3 Branson	(United States) Branson, Missouri
Sep 23, 2012	Ironman 70.3 Pays d'Aix	Aix-en-Provence, France
Sep 30, 2012	Ironman 70.3 Pocono Mountains	(United States) Stroudsburg, Pennsylvania
Sep 30, 2012	Ironman 70.3 Augusta	(United States) Augusta, Georgia
Oct 21, 2012	Ironman 70.3 Mandurah	Mandurah, Australia
Oct 28, 2012	Ironman 70.3 Port MacQuarie	(Australia) Port Macquarie, New South Wales
Oct 28, 2012	Ironman 70.3 Austin	(United States) Austin, Texas
Oct 28, 2012	Ironman 70.3 Miami	(United States) Miami, Florida
Nov 4, 2012	Ironman 70.3 Taiwan	Hengchun, Taiwan
Nov 10, 2012	Ironman 70.3 Lanzarote	Lanzarote, Spain
Nov 11, 2012	Ironman 70.3 Shepparton	(Australia) Shepparton, Victoria
Dec 2, 2012	Ironman 70.3 Phuket	Phuket, Thailand
Dec 16, 2012	Ironman 70.3 Canberra	(Australia) Canberra, ACT
Jan 13, 2013	Ironman 70.3 Pucón	Pucón, Chile
Jan 20, 2013	Ironman 70.3 Asia Pacific Championship – Auckland^{†}	Auckland, New Zealand
Jan 20, 2013	Ironman 70.3 South Africa	Buffalo City, South Africa
Feb 3, 2013	Ironman 70.3 Latin American Championship – Panama	Panama City, Panama
Feb 10, 2013	Geelong Long Course Tri	(Australia) Geelong, Victoria
Mar 17, 2013	Ironman 70.3 San Juan	San Juan, Puerto Rico
Mar 30, 2013	Ironman 70.3 California	(United States) Oceanside, California
Apr 7, 2013	Ironman 70.3 Texas	(United States) Austin, Texas
Apr 21, 2013	Ironman 70.3 New Orleans	(United States) New Orleans, Louisiana
May 4, 2013	Ironman 70.3 U.S. Pro Championship – St. George	(United States) St. George, Utah
May 5, 2013	Ironman 70.3 St Croix^{†}	(United States Virgin Islands) Saint Croix, U.S. Virgin Islands
May 11, 2013	Ironman 70.3 Busselton	Busselton, Western Australia
May 11, 2013	Ironman 70.3 Mallorca	Alcudia, Mallorca, Spain
May 19, 2013	Ironman 70.3 Florida	(United States) Haines City, Florida
May 26, 2013	Ironman 70.3 Austria	St. Pölten/Vienna, Austria
Jun 1, 2013	Ironman 70.3 Hawaii^{†}	(United States) Kohala, Hawaii
Jun 2, 2013	Ironman 70.3 Japan^{†}	Tokoname, Aichi, Japan
Jun 2, 2013	Ironman 70.3 Switzerland	Rapperswil-Jona, Switzerland
Jun 2, 2013	Ironman 70.3 Raleigh	(United States) Raleigh, North Carolina
Jun 8, 2013	Ironman 70.3 Boise	(United States) Boise, Idaho
Jun 9, 2013	Ironman 70.3 Italy	Pescara, Italy
Jun 9, 2013	Ironman 70.3 Cairns	(Australia) Cairns, Queensland
Jun 9, 2013	Ironman 70.3 Kansas	(United States) Lawrence, Kansas
Jun 9, 2013	Ironman 70.3 Eagleman^{†}	(United States) Cambridge, Maryland
Jun 16, 2013	Ironman 70.3 Berlin^{‡}	Berlin, Germany
Jun 16, 2013	Ironman 70.3 U.K.	(United Kingdom) Wimbleball, Exmoor, UK
Jun 23, 2013	Ironman 70.3 Syracuse	(United States) Syracuse, New York
Jun 23, 2013	Ironman 70.3 Mont Tremblant	(Canada) Mont-Tremblant, Quebec
Jun 30, 2013	Ironman 70.3 Buffalo Springs Lake^{‡}	(United States) Lubbock, Texas
Jul 7, 2013	Ironman 70.3 Norway	Haugesund, Norway
Jul 13, 2013	Ironman 70.3 Muncie	(United States) Muncie, Indiana
Jul 14, 2013	Ironman 70.3 Vineman	(United States) Sonoma County, California
Jul 21, 2013	Ironman 70.3 Racine	(United States) Racine, Wisconsin
Jul 21, 2013	Ironman 70.3 Lake Stevens	(United States) Lake Stevens, Washington
Jul 28, 2013	Ironman 70.3 Calgary	Calgary, Alberta, Canada
Aug 4, 2013	Ironman 70.3 Philippines	Cebu, Philippines
Aug 4, 2013	Ironman 70.3 Steelhead	(United States) Benton Harbor, Michigan
Aug 4, 2013	Ironman 70.3 Boulder	(United States) Boulder, Colorado
Aug 11, 2013	Ironman 70.3 European Championship – Wiesbaden^{†}	Wiesbaden, Germany

^{†}Also serves as a 2013 Ironman World Championship qualifier.
^{‡}Also serves as a 2013 Ironman World Championship handcycle qualifier

The Ironman 70.3 Switzerland race was canceled due to weather. The race was initially changed to a duathlon due to cold temperatures preventing the swim portion from taking place. However, rain in the region caused both a landslide and a falling tree to obstruct the bike course forcing race organizers to cancel the race entirely.

=== 2013 Ironman 70.3 Series results ===
==== Men ====
Event	Gold	Time	Silver	Time	Bronze	Time	Reference
Yeppoon	Rasmus Henning (AUS)	3:49:42	Samuel Betten (AUS)	3:50:15	Matty White (AUS)	3:55:18	
Timberman	Joe Gambles (AUS)	3:48:30	Leon Griffin (AUS)	3:50:53	Kevin Collington (USA)	4:01:10	
Steelhead	Daniel Bretscher (USA)	3:57:17	Maria De Elias (ARG)	4:00:42	Zach Ruble (USA)	4:04:01	
Brazil	Terenzo Bozzone (NZL)	3:52:53	Fabio Carvalho (BRA)	3:53:59	Igor Amorelli (BRA)	3:54:01	
Salzburg	Alessandro Degasperi (ITA)	3:46:06	Daniel Fontana (ITA)	3:48:01	Alberto Casadei (ITA)	3:49:22	
Ireland	Jan Van Berkel (SUI)	3:54:35	Terenzo Bozzone (NZL)	3:54:36	Mike Aigroz (SUI)	3:59:51	
Las Vegas	Sebastian Kienle (GER)	3:54:45	Craig Alexander (AUS)	3:55:36	Bevan Docherty (NZL)	3:56:25	
Muskoka	Tom Lowe (GBR)	4:08:54	Andrew Russell (CAN)	4:11:00	Cameron Good (AUS)	4:11:33	
Cozumel	Andi Böcherer (GER)	3:53:45	Daniel Fontana (ITA)	3:56:20	Paul Ambrose (GBR)	3:57:20	
Branson	Andy Potts (USA)	4:04:23	Ben Hoffman (USA)	4:08:23	Mario De Elias (ARG)	4:12:38	
Pays d'Aix	Cyril Viennot (FRA)	4:01:00	Stéphane Poulat (FRA)	4:02:03	Hervé Banti (FRA)	4:03:41	
Pocono Mountains	Jesse Thomas (USA)	3:49:41	Jordan Jones (USA)	3:54:02	Maik Twelsiek (GER)	3:55:01	
Augusta	Maxim Kriat (UKR)	3:49:14	Nick Waninger (USA)	3:50:38	Patrick Evo (USA)	3:52:29	
Mandurah	Tim Berkel (AUS)	3:39:59	Tim Reed (AUS)	3:41:45	Ruedi Wild (SUI)	3:43:30	
Port MacQuarie	Clayton Fettell (AUS)	3:50:15	Tim Berkel (AUS)	3:54:45	James Bowstead (NZL)	3:57:08	
Austin	Andy Potts (USA)	3:51:29	T. J. Tollakson (USA)	3:52:07	Chris McCormack (AUS)	3:55:24	
Miami	Terenzo Bozzone (NZL)	3:42:17	Jan Van Berkel (SUI)	3:43:52	Horst Reichel (GER)	3:44:14	
Taiwan	Terenzo Bozzone (NZL)	3:54:18	Danylo Sapunov (UKR)	4:02:15	Michael Goehner (DEU)	4:09:56	
Lanzarote	Iván Raña (ESP)	4:07:35	Ronnie Schildknecht (SUI)	4:11:27	Boris Stein (GER)	4:12:59	
Shepparton	Terenzo Bozzone (NZL)	3:46:59	Joseph Lampe (AUS)	3:51:58	Leon Griffin (AUS)	3:53:39	
Phuket	Chris McCormack (AUS)	4:04:40	Ruedi Wild (SUI)	4:07:17	Tim Meyer (GER)	4:07:32	
Canberra	Tim Reed (AUS)	3:40:13	Joseph Lampe (AUS)	3:42:57	Michael Prince (AUS)	3:46:15	
Pucón	Reinaldo Colucci (BRA)	4:04:12	Daniel Fontana (ITA)	4:04:15	Felipe Van de Wyngard (CHI)	4:08:43	
Auckland	Christian Kemp (AUS)	3:56:03	Bevan Docherty (NZL)	3:56:37	Clark Ellice (NZL)	3:58:24	
South Africa	Bart Aernouts (BEL)	4:03:53	Ronnie Schildknecht (SUI)	4:06:23	Tim Don (GBR)	4:10:40	
Panama	Oscar Galíndez (ARG)	3:58:31	Bevan Docherty (NZL)	4:00:05	Richie Cunningham (AUS)	4:03:09	
Geelong	Christian Kemp (AUS)	3:47:21	Luke Bell (AUS)	3:47:53	James Hodge (AUS)	3:49:48	
San Juan	Andrew Starykowicz (USA)	3:50:12	Bertrand Billard (FRA)	3:51:02	Timothy O'Donnell (USA)	3:51:19	
California	Andy Potts (USA)	3:49:45	Jesse Thomas (USA)	3:49:55	Andi Böcherer (GER)	3:51:56	
Texas	Richie Cunningham (AUS)	3:48:25	Tim Berkel (AUS)	3:51:36	Chris McDonald (AUS)	3:53:16	
New Orleans	Andreas Raelert (GER)	3:46:54	Trevor Wurtele (CAN)	3:46:59	Santiago Ascenço (BRA)	3:50:38	
St. George	Brent McMahon (CAN)	3:51:10	Kevin Collington (USA)	3:53:37	Andy Potts (USA)	3:54:21	
St. Croix	Richie Cunningham (AUS)	4:10:29	Will Clarke (GBR)	4:13:27	Clark Ellice (NZL)	4:13:32	
Busselton	Brad Kahlefeldt (AUS)	3:45:39	Tim Reed (AUS)	3:45:29	James Hodge (AUS)	3:49:25	
Mallorca	Eneko Llanos (ESP)	3:52:36	Bart Aernouts (BEL)	3:52:54	Andreas Raelert (GER)	3:54:53	
Florida	Terenzo Bozzone (NZL)	3:45:51	Kevin Collington (USA)	3:47:12	Dirk Bockel (LUX)	3:48:16	
Austria^{*}	Bart Aernouts (BEL)	3:22:35	Andi Böcherer (GER)	3:24:45	Eneko Llanos (ESP)	3:26:44	
Hawaii	Craig Alexander (AUS)	4:05:43	Paul Matthews (AUS)	4:12:13	Damon Barnett (USA)	4:14:14	
Japan	James Hodge (AUS)	3:50:58	Ryosuke Yamamoto (JPN)	3:52:17	Yuichi Hosoda (JPN)	3:56:13	
Raleigh	Greg Bennett (AUS)	3:51:24	Paul Eicher (USA)	4:04:41	Kyle Pawlaczyk (USA)	4:05:41	
Boise	Bevan Docherty (NZL)	3:52:55	Brent McMahon (CAN)	3:54:36	Josh Amberger (AUS)	3:57:09	
Italy	Horst Reichel (GER)	4:02:04	Alessandro Degasperi (ITA)	4:03:12	Manuel Küng (CHE)	4:03:32	
Cairns	Courtney Atkinson (AUS)	3:56:34	Brad Kahlefeldt (AUS)	3:57:26	Tim Reed (AUS)	3:59:54	
Kansas	Craig Alexander (AUS)	3:51:26	Daniel Bretscher (USA)	3:52:54	James Hadley (GBR)	3:59:07	
Eagleman	Andy Potts (USA)	3:47:46	James Cunnama (RSA)	3:49:00	Viktor Zyemtsev (UKR)	3:53:24	
U.K.	Ritchie Nicholls (GBR)	4:15:04	Tim Don (GBR)	4:20:07	Fraser Cartmell (GBR)	4:20:30	
Syracuse	Joe Gambles (AUS)	4:02:58	Sam Douglas (USA)	4:09:28	John Polson (AUS)	4:16:48	
Mont-Tremblant	Terenzo Bozzone (NZL)	3:53:12	Brent McMahon (CAN)	3:53:57	Romain Guillaume (FRA)	3:55:58	
Buffalo Springs	Greg Bennett (AUS)	3:48:58	Tim Reed (AUS)	3:51:24	Terenzo Bozzone (NZL)	3:55:20	
Norway	Filip Ospalý (CZE)	3:46:10	Ritchie Nicholls (GBR)	3:50:38	Brad Kahlefeldt (AUS)	3:53:42	
Muncie	Andrew Starykowicz (USA)	3:46:25	Tyler Butterfield (BER)	3:49:22	Callum Millward (NZL)	3:50:07	
Vineman	Bevan Docherty (NZL)	3:45:10	Tim Reed (AUS)	3:47:14	Terenzo Bozzone (NZL)	3:47:21	
Racine	Martin Jensen (DNK)	3:47:05	Andrew Starykowicz (USA)	3:48:34	Ivan Vasiliev (RUS)	3:51:22	
Lake Stevens	Craig Alexander (AUS)	3:55:23	Luke Bell (AUS)	3:55:59	Eliot Holtham (CAN)	3:59:40	
Calgary	Tim Don (GBR)	3:42:22	Trevor Wurtele (CAN)	3:42:57	Tyler Butterfield (BER)	3:43:39	
Philippines	Courtney Atkinson (AUS)	3:58:07	Pete Jacobs (AUS)	3:59:09	David Dellow (AUS)	4:02:22	
Steelhead	David Kahn (USA)	3:55:57	Daniel Bretscher (USA)	3:57:28	Daniel Stubleski (USA)	3:58:39	
Boulder	Joe Gambles (AUS)	3:44:41	Greg Bennett (AUS)	3:46:23	Callum Millward (NZL)	3:47:53	
Wiesbaden	Ritchie Nicholls (GBR)	3:56:55	Jan Frodeno (GER)	3:57:35	Alessandro Degasperi (ITA)	4:00:14	

^{*}Swim canceled due to low air and water temperatures

==== Women ====
Event	Gold	Time	Silver	Time	Bronze	Time	Reference
Yeppoon	Lisa Marangon (AUS)	4:17:27	Sarah Crowley (AUS)	4:24:21	Kristy Hallett (AUS)	4:30:41	
Timberman	Heather Wurtele (CAN)	4:20:48	Caitlin Snow (USA)	4:21:01	Linsey Corbin (USA)	4:23:50	
Steelhead	Jessica Jacobs (USA)	4:24:43	Lesley Smith (USA)	4:28:38	Mandy McLane (USA)	4:29:03	
Brazil	Valentina Prieto (CHI)	4:37:20	Suzana Festner (BRA)	4:39:50	Carla Moreno (BRA)	4:43:49	
Salzburg	Gina Crawford (NZL)	4:13:24	Sonja Tajsich (GER)	4:14:07	Ewa Bugdol (POL)	4:20:15	
Ireland	Tine Deckers (BEL)	4:24:35	Eimear Mullan (IRL)	4:42:03	Jennifer Duffy (IRL)	4:53:24	
Las Vegas	Leanda Cave (GBR)	4:28:05	Kelly Williamson (USA)	4:29:24	Heather Jackson (USA)	4:32:32	
Muskoka	Rachel Joyce (GBR)	4:34:47	Tenille Hoogland (CAN)	4:44:10	Michelle Vesterby (DNK)	4:48:10	
Cozumel	Liz Blatchford (GBR)	4:14:31	Melissa Hauschildt (AUS)	4:18:36	Yvonne van Vlerken (NED)	4:22:10	
Branson	Jenny Fletcher (USA)	4:57:03	Nina Kraft (GER)	4:57:33	Caroline Gregory (USA)	5:06:38	
Pays d'Aix	Mary Beth Ellis (USA)	4:25:17	Jeanne Collonge (FRA)	4:25:17	Sophie De Groote (BEL)	4:29:26	
Pocono Mountains	Tenille Hoogland (CAN)	4:23:52	Amber Ferreira (USA)	4:30:35	Beth Shutt (USA)	4:30:57	
Augusta	Melissa Hauschildt (AUS)	4:06:56	Emma-Kate Lidbury (GBR)	4:13:07	Tamara Kozulina (UKR)	4:20:15	
Mandurah	Melissa Hauschildt (AUS)	4:03:55	Liz Blatchford (GBR)	4:04:45	Radka Vodickova (CZE)	4:08:59	
Port MacQuarie	Britta Martin (NZL)	4:32:26	Rebecca Hoschke (AUS)	4:37:07	Kat Baker (AUS)	4:39:41	
Austin	Rachel McBride (CAN)	4:20:53	Yvonne van Vlerken (NED)	4:24:03	Tenille Hoogland (CAN)	4:25:07	
Miami	Leanda Cave (GBR)	4:07:27	Lisa Hütthaler (AUT)	4:08:48	Margaret Shapiro (USA)	4:09:47	
Taiwan	Keiko Tanaka (JPN)	4:29:10	Belinda Granger (AUS)	4:39:06	Jenny Li (TWN)	4:09:47	
Lanzarote	Danne Boterenbrood (NED)	4:40:05	Sophie De Groote (BEL)	4:41:55	Sonja Tajsich (GER)	4:44:03	
Shepparton	Rebekah Keat (AUS)	4:16:17	Lisa Marangon (AUS)	4:22:47	Katherine Baker (AUS)	4:27:37	
Phuket	Melissa Hauschildt (AUS)	4:23:30	Radka Vodickova (CZE)	4:31:26	Belinda Granger (AUS)	4:41:53	
Canberra	Annabel Luxford (AUS)	4:04:25	Anna Cleaver (NZL)	4:10:35	Sarah Crowley (AUS)	4:14:59	
Pucón	Valentina Carvallo (CHI)	4:39:43	Sarah Piampiano (USA)	4:53:36	Federica Frontini (URU)	5:26:02	
Auckland	Annabel Luxford (AUS)	4:19:19	Caroline Steffen (SUI)	4:25:16	Meredith Kessler (USA)	4:29:25	
South Africa	Jodie Swallow (GBR)	4:34:29	Susie Hignett (GBR)	4:43:38	Lucie Zelenkova Reed (CZE)	4:44:19	
Panama	Heather Wurtele (CAN)	4:21:22	Camilla Pedersen (DEN)	4:25:11	Kelly Williamson (USA)	4:29:09	
Geelong	Melissa Hauschildt (AUS)	4:11:20	Emma Moffatt (AUS)	4:12:36	Anna Cleaver (AUS)	4:24:03	
San Juan	Helle Frederiksen (DEN)	4:11:35	Svenja Bazlen (GER)	4:13:24	Camilla Pedersen (DEN)	4:19:00	
California	Heather Jackson (USA)	4:13:48	Heather Wurtele (CAN)	4:16:11	Lesley Paterson (GBR)	4:17:46	
Texas	Emma-Kate Lidbury (GBR)	4:13:54	Kelly Williamson (USA)	4:16:06	Caitlin Snow (USA)	4:17:40	
New Orleans	Haley Chura (USA)	4:18:20	Amy Marsh (USA)	4:20:39	Kristin Andrews (USA)	4:22:59	
St. George	Meredith Kessler (USA)	4:17:11	Svenja Bazlen (GER)	4:18:46	Heather Wurtele (CAN)	4:20:26	
St. Croix	Catriona Morrison (GBR)	4:38:56	Joanna Lawn (NZL)	4:44:00	Maria Csesnik (POL)	4:45:48	
Busselton	Liz Blatchford (GBR)	4:19:07	Kate Bevilaqua (AUS)	4:22:22	Anna Ross (NZL)	4:24:09	
Mallorca	Lisa Hütthaler (AUT)	4:24:25	Yvonne van Vlerken (NED)	4:27:17	Lucy Gossage (GBR)	4:30:03	
Florida	Mary Beth Ellis (USA)	4:14:03	Mandy McLane (USA)	4:19:10	Joanna Lawn (NZL)	4:20:51	
Austria^{*}	Lisa Hütthaler (AUT)	3:49:55	Eva Nystrom (SWE)	3:51:30	Yvonne van Vlerken (NED)	3:51:35	
Hawaii	Belinda Granger (AUS)	4:44:46	Laura Siddall (GBR)	4:45:56	Julia Grant (NZL)	4:46:46	
Japan	Ai Ueda (JPN)	4:18:26	Chihiro Ikeno (JPN)	4:28:17	Jenny Li (TWN)	4:29:27	
Raleigh	Laura Bennett (USA)	4:17:18	Emma-Kate Lidbury (GBR)	4:21:14	Melanie McQuaid (CAN)	4:26:56	
Boise	Liz Lyles (USA)	4:10:19	Heather Jackson (USA)	4:17:42	Uli Brömme (GER)	4:42:07	
Italy	Erika Csomor (HUN)	4:33:13	Tamsin Lewis (GBR)	4:33:39	Michi Herlbauer (AUT)	4:40:25	
Cairns	Kym Jaenke (AUS)	4:38:28	Samantha Warriner (NZL)	4:39:19	Kiyomi Niwata (JPN)	4:40:25	
Kansas	Emma-Kate Lidbury (GBR)	4:15:39	Danielle Kehoe (USA)	4:21:47	Mandy McLane (USA)	4:23:46	
Eagleman	Angela Naeth (CAN)	4:14:06	Laura Bennett (USA)	4:17:21	Amber Ferreira (USA)	4:22:26	
U.K.	Eimear Mullan (IRL)	4:56:59	Holly Lawrence (GBR)	4:58:01	Kristin Möller (GER)	5:02:33	
Syracuse	Lisa Norden (SWE)	4:24:37	Heather Leiggi (USA)	4:47:26	Molly Roohi (USA)	4:47:41	
Mont-Tremblant	Linsey Corbin (USA)	4:26:05	Magali Tisseyre (CAN)	4:26:47	Melanie McQuaid (CAN)	4:36:13	
Buffalo Springs	Angela Naeth (CAN)	4:16:08	Laura Bennett (USA)	4:21:38	Amy Marsh (USA)	4:22:03	
Norway	Lisa Hütthaler (AUT)	4:12:11	Catriona Morrison (GBR)	4:15:13	Mette Moe (NOR)	4:21:01	
Muncie	Magali Tisseyre (CAN)	4:12:59	Kate Bevilaqua (AUS)	4:22:52	Nina Kraft (GER)	4:25:44	
Vineman	Meredith Kessler (USA)	4:13:18	Heather Jackson (USA)	4:15:09	Amy Marsh (USA)	4:19:45	
Racine	Angela Naeth (CAN)	4:15:00	Mirinda Carfrae (USA)	4:15:51	Catriona Morrison (GBR)	4:16:04	
Lake Stevens	Meredith Kessler (USA)	4:18:05	Melanie McQuaid (CAN)	4:23:22	Lauren Barnett (USA)	4:29:01	
Calgary	Heather Wurtele (CAN)	4:11:42	Rachel McBride (CAN)	4:13:49	Mandy McLane (USA)	4:14:11	
Philippines	Caroline Steffen (SUI)	4:16:12	Bree Wee (USA)	4:27:49	Belinda Granger (AUS)	4:33:50	
Steelhead	Caitlin Snow (USA)	4:13:53	Radka Vodičková (CZE)	4:16:44	Melanie McQuaid (CAN)	4:26:08	
Boulder	Melissa Hauschildt (AUS)	4:04:36	Leanda Cave (GBR)	4:17:26	Amanda Stevens (USA)	4:17:59	
Wiesbaden	Daniela Ryf (SUI)	4:31:34	Annabel Luxford (AUS)	4:32:43	Catriona Morrison (GBR)	4:36:27	

^{*}Swim canceled due to low air and water temperatures
