= Heather Wurtele =

Canadian triathlete (born 1979)

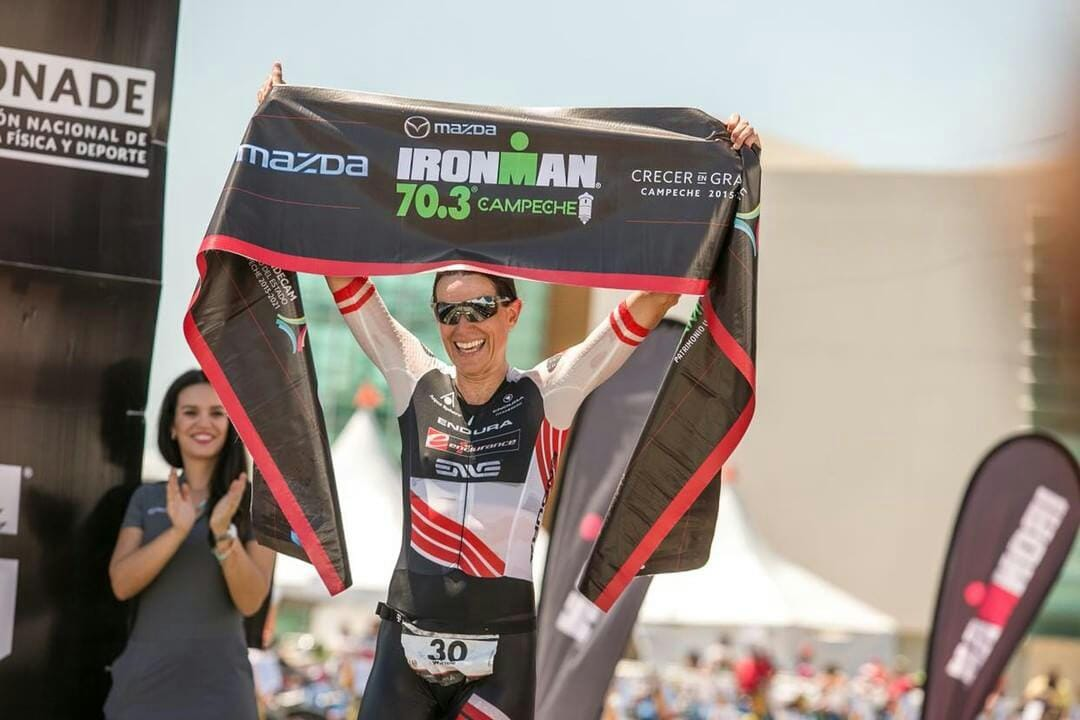

Personal information
- Born: 12 July 1979 (age 46) Calgary, Alberta
- Height: 6 ft 2 in (1.88 m)
- Weight: 150 lb (68 kg)
- Spouse: Trevor Wurtele

Sport
- Country: Canada
- Sport: Triathlon
- Turned pro: 2007
- Coached by: Paulo Sousa
- Retired: 2019
Medal record
Representing Canada
Women's triathlon
Ironman 70.3 World Championship
| Bronze medal – third place | 2016 Mooloolaba | Elite |
| Silver medal – second place | 2015 Zell am See | Elite |
| Bronze medal – third place | 2014 Mont-Tremblant | Elite |
ITU Long Distance World Championships
| Bronze medal – third place | 2017 Penticton | Elite |

Heather Wurtele (née Danforth, born 12 July 1979) is a retired Canadian professional triathlete who raced long-distance, non-drafting triathlon events. She achieved over 60 career professional triathlon podium finishes and 30 plus career wins, including 25 half iron distance wins and 7 Ironman wins. Her career highlights include placing third at the 2016 Ironman 70.3 World Championship, second at the 2015 Ironman 70.3 World Championship and third at the 2014 Ironman 70.3 World Championship. She also placed 3rd at the ITU Long Course World Championships in 2017 and won the North American 70.3 Championships in 2015 and 2016.

== Career ==
Wurtele grew up in Vernon, British Columbia and attended Clarence Fulton High School. While focused on academics growing up she also enjoyed downhill skiing and played volleyball and basketball. Despite her size being an advantage in the latter two sports, and excelling as a middle blocker in volleyball, she admitted that she was not very good at basketball and had no ball handling skills. She then attended the University of British Columbia where she was on the varsity rowing team for four years and would earn a degree forest genetics. She continued on in academia at the University of Victoria earning a master's degree in plant physiology.

Wurtele participated in adventure racing for two years, but grew tired of the equipment intensive sport and didn't enjoy orienteering. Wurtele moved on to participate in a few triathlons in 2004, having some modest success in her age group. She moved to Norway in 2005 so that she could pursue a doctoral degree in plant genetics and forestry. After a year as a full-time student she put getting her Ph.D. on hold and returned to North America where she began intense training as age-group athlete. That year she won the Canadian Long Course Championships, beating former Ironman World Champion Lori Bowden, and then one week later was the first overall female age-group athlete at Ironman Coeur d’Alene. This qualified her for the Ironman World Championships.

In 2007 Wurtele received her pro card after seeing the prize money she was forfeiting as an amateur the previous year. The next year she and husband Trevor, who also received his pro triathlon card, decided to fully commit to the sport of triathlon. As a result, they both quit their jobs, Wurtele's as a lab technician at Natural Resources Canada and Trevor's as a currency broker, they sold most of their possessions, and purchased an RV that they used to travel from race to race and to different training locations. That year she won her first big race as a professional at Ironman Coeur d'Alene. Subsequently, she notched two more Ironman wins at Coeur d'Alene, two Ironman St. George wins, and a win at Ironman Lake Placid. At Ironman 70.3 and half-iron distance races she accumulated over two dozen wins.

In October 2019, Wurtele and her husband, Trevor, both jointly announced their retirement from professional racing.

== Awards and recognition ==
- Canadian Multi-Sport Female-Athlete-of-the-Year (2013, 2014, 2015, 2016, 2017)
- Canadian Long Course Triathlete of the year (2010, 2011)

== Personal ==
While earning her masters Wurtele reconnected with friend and high school classmate, Trevor Wurtele. They were engaged prior to moving together to Norway and were married after returning to Canada.

== Results ==
Wurtele's results include:

Results list

| Year | Event | Place |
|---|---|---|
| 2019 | Ironman Canada | 1 |
| 2019 | Ironman 70.3 Coeur d'Alene | 3 |
| 2019 | Ironman 70.3 Campeche | 1 |
| 2019 | Ironman 70.3 Victoria | 2 |
| 2019 | Ironman 70.3 St. George | 3 |
| 2018 | The Championship - Challenge | 6 |
| 2018 | Ironman 70.3 World Championship | 11 |
| 2018 | Ironman 70.3 Los Cabos | 3 |
| 2018 | Ironman 70.3 Xiamen | 2 |
| 2018 | Ironman 70.3 Santa Rosa | 2 |
| 2018 | Challenge Geraardsbergen | 1 |
| 2018 | Ironman 70.3 Campeche | 1 |
| 2018 | Ironman Wales | 4 |
| 2018 | Ironman 70.3 Texas | 3 |
| 2018 | Ironman 70.3 St. George | 6 |
| 2017 | Ironman 70.3 World Championship | 7 |
| 2017 | Challenge Heilbronn | 2 |
| 2017 | The Championship - Challenge | 3 |
| 2017 | ITU Long Distance Triathlon World Championships | 3 |
| 2017 | Challenge Peguera Mallorca | 1 |
| 2017 | Challenge Forte Village Sardinia | 1 |
| 2017 | Ironman 70.3 Campeche | 1 |
| 2017 | Ironman 70.3 Oceanside | 3 |
| 2016 | Ironman World Championship | 12 |
| 2016 | Ironman 70.3 Mount Tremblant | 1 |
| 2016 | Ironman 70.3 World Championship | 3 |
| 2016 | Challenge Iceland | 1 |
| 2016 | Ironman 70.3 Victoria | 1 |
| 2016 | Ironman 70.3 Monterrey | 1 |
| 2016 | Ironman 70.3 St. George | 1 |
| 2016 | Ironman 70.3 Oceanside | 1 |
| 2015 | Ironman World Championship | DNF |
| 2015 | Ironman 70.3 World Championship | 2 |
| 2015 | Ironman 70.3 St. George | 1 |
| 2015 | Ironman 70.3 Racine | 1 |
| 2015 | Challenge Dubai | 2 |
| 2015 | Ironman 70.3 Oceanside | 2 |
| 2015 | Ironman Texas | 7 |
| 2014 | Ironman Coeur d'Alene | 1 |
| 2014 | Ironman 70.3 Monterrey | 1 |
| 2014 | Ironman 70.3 Oceanside | 1 |
| 2014 | Ironman 70.3 Eagleman | 1 |
| 2014 | Ironman 70.3 World Championship | 3 |
| 2014 | Ironman 70.3 St. George | 3 |
| 2014 | UWC Triathlon | 3 |
| 2014 | Ironman World Championship | 15 |
| 2014 | Ironman 70.3 Panama | DNF |
| 2013 | Ironman Coeur d'Alene | 1 |
| 2013 | Rev3 Quassy | 1 |
| 2013 | Ironman 70.3 Panama | 1 |
| 2013 | Ironman 70.3 Calgary | 1 |
| 2013 | Ironman 70.3 St George | 3 |
| 2013 | Abu Dhabi International Triathlon | 4 |
| 2013 | Ironman 70.3 Oceanside | 2 |
| 2013 | Ironman 70.3 World Championship | 10 |
| 2013 | Ironman World Championship | DNF |
| 2012 | Ironman 70.3 Timberman | 1 |
| 2012 | Ironman 70.3 World Championship | 6 |
| 2012 | Ironman World Championship | 14 |
| 2012 | Rev3 Quassy | 2 |
| 2012 | Ironman 70.3 New Orleans | 2 |
| 2012 | Ironman European Championship | 8 |
| 2012 | Ironman 70.3 Texas | 8 |
| 2012 | Ironman Coeur d'Alene | DNF |
| 2012 | UWC Triathlon Bahamas | 3 |
| 2011 | Ironman World Championship | 8 |
| 2011 | Ironman Lake Placid | 1 |
| 2011 | Ironman St. George | 1 |
| 2011 | Ironman 70.3 World Championship | 7 |
| 2011 | Ironman 70.3 Oceanside | 4 |
| 2011 | Ironman 70.3 Boise | 2 |
| 2010 | Ironman St. George | 1 |
| 2010 | Osoyoos Desert Half Iron | 1 |
| 2010 | Ironman Canada | 2 |
| 2010 | Ironman 70.3 Calgary | 2 |
| 2010 | Vancouver International Half Iron | 2 |
| 2010 | Ironman 70.3 Austin | 5 |
| 2010 | Ironman Arizona | 5 |
| 2010 | Ironman 70.3 Oceanside | DNF |
| 2009 | Ironman World Championship | DNF |
| 2009 | Ironman 70.3 Lake Stevens | 2 |
| 2009 | Osyoos Desert Half Iron | 1 |
| 2009 | Ironman Coeur d’Alene | 3 |
| 2009 | Wildflower Triathlon | 5 |
| 2009 | Ironman 70.3 Oceanside | 11 |
| 2008 | Ironman Coeur d'Alene | 1 |
| 2008 | Ironman Canada | 3 |
| 2008 | Ironman Boise 70.3 | 3 |
| 2008 | Wildflower Triathlon | 5 |
| 2007 | New Balance Half Iron | 1 |
| 2007 | Ironman 70.3 Lake Stevens | 4 |
| 2007 | Wildflower Triathlon | 10 |
| 2006 | Ironman World Championship | 6 (25–29) |
| 2006 | Vineman Half Ironman | 2 (25–29) |
| 2006 | Ironman Coeur d'Alene | 1 overall female amateur |
| 2006 | Canadian Long Course Championships - Half Iron | 1 |
| 2004 | New Balance Half Iron | 2 (20–24) |
| 2004 | Bakers Breakfast Olympic Distance | 2 (20–24) |
