= Melissa Hauschildt =

Australian professional triathlete and former middle-distance runner

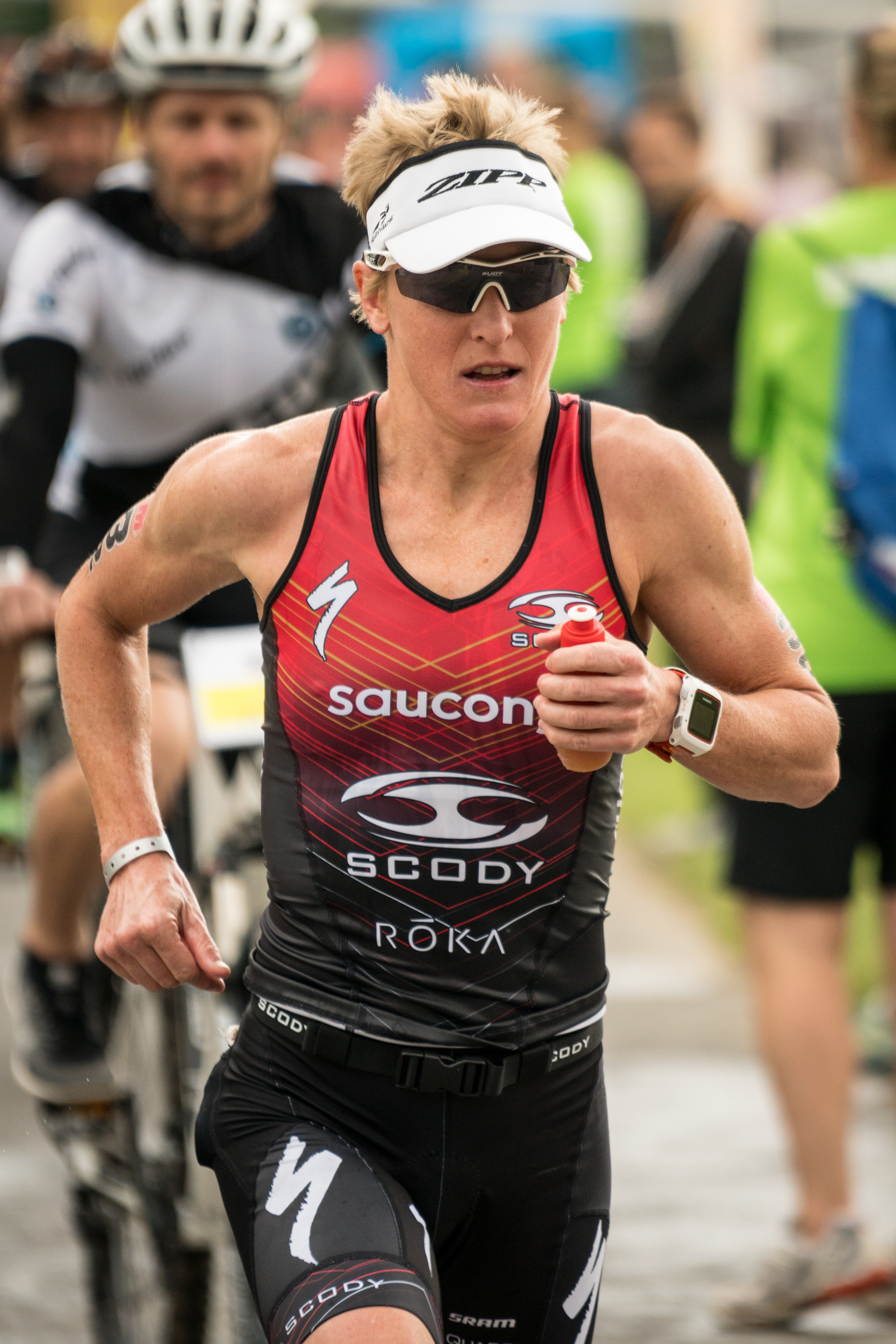
- Hauschildt racing at Ironman Germany in 2016

Personal information
- Born: 13 April 1983 (age 43)
- Spouse: Jared Hauschildt
- Website: www.melissahauschildt.com

Sport
- Country: Australia
- Sport: Athletics, Triathlon
Medal record
Representing Australia
Women's athletics
Commonwealth Games
Silver medal – second place	2006 Melbourne	3000 m steeplechase
World Cross Country Championships
Bronze medal – third place	2008 Edinburgh	Team
Bronze medal – third place	2006 Fukuoka	Team
Women's triathlon
Ironman 70.3 World Championships
Gold medal – first place	2013	Elite
Gold medal – first place	2011	Elite
Silver medal – second place	2016	Elite
ITU Long Distance World Championships
Gold medal – first place	2013	Elite

Melissa Hauschildt (née Rollison, born 13 April 1983 in Adelaide) is an Australian professional triathlete and former middle-distance runner. She is a 3-time World Champion, winning Gold at the 2011 and 2013 Ironman 70.3 World Championship as well as the 2013 ITU Long Distance Triathlon World Championships. She also won Silver at the 2016 Ironman 70.3 World Championships. In April 2018, Hauschildt set a new Ironman brand record of 8:31:05, at the Ironman North American Championships, breaking the previous record of 8:33:56 set by Chrissie Wellington in 2011.

During Hauschildt's athletic career she has won 12 Australian Championship titles ranging in distance from 3000m on the track to the full Ironman distance in triathlon, she has set multiple National and World records in running and triathlon. In 2001 she won Gold at the Goodwill Games Steeplechase and in 2006 she won Silver at the Commonwealth Games. She has also won two team bronze medals at the World Cross Country Championships in 2006 and 2008.

== Athletic career ==
=== Running career ===
Hauschildt began her athletic career at the age of 11 years old, running on the grass tracks of her hometown at the Gold Coast, Australia and began to excel in the 800m, reaching state level. She was soon approached by coach Brian Chapman and in the following year won the Australian Cross Country Championships (Under 12).

Hauschildt won her steeplechase debut over 2000m at the Queensland All Schools Championships in October, 1998. In December she won the inaugural Australian All Schools Championships under-18 2000m steeplechase title and, as the season closed, posted the Australian under-20 and under-18 2000m steeplechase records (both records still stand today). In March 1999, aged just 15, Hauschildt won her first Australian senior title over 3000m steeplechase in a time of 10.15.77. She ran her 3000m steeplechase debut just months earlier in Brisbane, clocking 10.26.95, and 12 months later at the next Australian Championships, held at Stadium Australia, she again claimed the Open title and became the first person to set a World (Junior) Record in the Olympic stadium.

Outside of steeplechase, Hauschildt placed eighth in the 1500m at the World Junior Championships in Santiago, Chile in October and then, in March 2001, placed 14th in the World Junior Cross Country Championships in Oostende, Belgium.

The biggest steeplechase competition to date was set for the 2001 Goodwill Games where the field included world No. 2 Irene Likma of Kenya and previous world record-holder Cristina Iloc-Casandra. Hauschildt won the race by nine seconds, clocking the second best time in history and regaining her World Junior Record (9.30.70). In December 2001, Hauschildt won the Zatopek Junior 3000m in a personal best time of 9:03.64 and, in the days that followed, ran the fastest 800m (2:06.10) and 1500m (4:15.67) in the 25-year history of the Australian All Schools Championships. In March 2002 she went on to claim her 3rd Australian steeplechase crown in a new meet record.

Hauschildt ran strongly during the 2003–04 domestic season, slashing her 5000m best to 15:55.19 and placing third in the Australian Olympic Trials. Injury resurfaced taking Hauschildt out of the 2004 Olympic Games and she did not run again until January 2006, when re-uniting with coach Nic Bideau. She returned running at her best and setting new personal bests in the 3000m and 3000m steeplechase. Two world-class steeplechases included another Australian title, in a time of 9.35.46 to break her own Championship record and a silver medal at her first Commonwealth Games – in an Australian record of 9.24.29. A week later, Hauschildt was part of the Australian women's short course team that captured the country's first ever team bronze medal at the IAAF World Cross Country Championships in Fukuoka, Japan – finishing a superb 11th in the individual race.

In November 2006, Hauschildt required surgery on a ruptured hamstring tendon sustained during training in the UK earlier in the year. Following a lengthy rehabilitation she was then diagnosed with stress fractures in her lower back in May. A burst cyst in her knee also surfaced.

In 2008, Hauschildt made a return to racing and a return to the Australian Championships, finishing second (9:50.59) behind Olympic hopeful Donna Macfarlane. This race gave her qualification for the 2008 Olympic Games. In early March she travelled to Stromlo Forest Park in Canberra to compete in the Australian selection trials for the IAAF World Cross Country titles. Hauschildt finished second on the 8 km circuit in a time of 27:40.65 and secured her spot on the Australian team. She ran strongly to finish 26th at the IAAF World Cross Country Championships in Edinburgh, Scotland, helping the team secure a bronze medal. Injury would again prevent her racing the 2008 Olympic Games.

In April, 2010, Hauschildt once again performed well at the Australian Championships to claim her 5th Open 3000m steeplechase crown. During mid 2010, Hauschildt's bid for the Dheli Commonwealth Games was derailed due to injury. It was at this point, while cross-training on the bike that she made the decision to change focus from running to triathlon. In the months that followed, she enjoyed a good start to her triathlon career with numerous wins and a handful of course records within the space of a few months.

=== Triathlon career ===
At the end of 2010 Hauschildt made a career transformation from professional runner to professional triathlete. She raced and won her first three triathlons, claiming top spot on the podium in the Olympic distance Kinsgscliffe triathlon in September, Sprint distance triathlon at Raby Bay in October, and the Gold Coast Half Ironman in a new course record. She then raced her way into the top five at the prestigious Noosa Triathlon in October and two weeks later took another win in Sydney. The most significant result to date came when she finished the year with a 2nd place in the Asia Pacific 70.3 Championships in Phuket in December. Only beaten by Swiss star Caroline Steffen.

In 2011, she made a full-time, dedicated switch to triathlon and went on to be undefeated in her first full year in the sport. In the process she broke numerous course records and won a handful of major races around the world including the 2011 Ironman 70.3 World Championship the 70.3 Asia-Pacific Championships and the shorter Olympic distance Noosa Triathlon. For her achievements, Hauschildt was awarded Female Triathlete of the year at Triathlon Australia's annual awards banquet. 2012 brought continued success with a further nine podium finishes, five wins, three more course records and the Australian 70.3 Championship title. The 2012 season finished with a 4th place at the 2012 Ironman 70.3 World Championship and successive wins at Ironman Augusta 70.3, Ironman Mandurah 70.3, and Ironman Phuket 70.3.

Hauschildt continued her winning streak into 2013 with victories over the longer course triathlons at the Australian Long Course Championships, Abu Dhabi International Tri, Koh Samui Tri and the ITU Long Distance Triathlon World Championships in Belfort, France. She then went on to dominate the US season with four more Ironman 70.3 wins including her 2nd Ironman 70.3 World Championship in Las Vegas with another new course record. This win brought her a second world title within the one calendar year. Only the fourth person in history to achieve this behind Simon Lessing, Craig Alexander and Leanda Cave. She also became the first female to win the World 70.3 title twice. Hauschildt returned to Australia to cap off her year claiming her fourth Australian Triathlon Championship title at Mandurah 70.3 in a new course record, and taking out the Phuket Double with wins in the Laguna Phuket Triathlon and the Challenge Phuket Half. Melissa's achievements for 2013 earned her the title of Female Triathlete of the Year by Triathlete Magazine. Ironman.com awarded her with Performance of the Year.

Hauschildt began 2014 as another highly successful year with a series of wins around the world. Highlights included a second consecutive win at the Abu Dhabi International Tri, followed by another Australian Title – this time at Ironman Australia on her first attempt at the full Ironman distance. Melissa also had a string of half-iron distance wins at Challenge Philippines, Ironman Racine 70.3 and Ironman Timberman 70.3. In 2014 Hauschildt was honored to be ranked by Triathlete Magazine at #13 on their list of the "25 greatest triathletes of all time". The year had shaped up perfectly in the lead-up to her Ironman 70.3 World Championship defense and her Ironman World Championship debut. Unfortunately the remainder of the 2014 season was derailed by a severe injury to the chest from the hands of a freak massaging slip-up just days before the 70.3 World Championships. The misdirected force to the chest wall from the massage dislocated Melissa's rib from its attachment at the sternum, causing the surrounding connective tissue and intercostal muscle fibres to tear away. The result left an unstable, subluxing rib that continued to painfully click in and out of place with the movement of each heart beat. After 8 weeks recovering, Hauschildt made an appearance in few end-of-year races to salvage an otherwise disappointing 2nd half of 2014.

In 2015, she began with a win in torrential weather conditions at Challenge Melbourne. In March 2015, Hauschildt produced a win at the Asia Pacific Ironman Championships at Ironman Melbourne. The next year proved to be yet another incredibly consistent year of racing for her as she went almost undefeated for the entire calendar year. She collected wins at Ironman Frankfurt (European Ironman Championships), Ironman 70.3 Wiesbaden (European 70.3 Championships), Ironman 70.3 Geelong (Australian 70.3 Championships) (in a new course record), Ironman Western Australia (in a new course record of 8hrs 54mins) and the Huskisson Triathlon. She also claimed the silver medal at the Ironman 70.3 World Championships in Mooloolaba, Australia before finishing the year with another win at the Ironman Western Australia.

In March 2017, Hauschildt underwent surgery to correct a kinked left common iliac artery. After the surgery was deemed unsuccessful, she returned to the operating table in June to have it repaired with a vein patch angioplasty to the common and external iliac arteries. This operation resulted in a series of emergency complications and significant blood loss. Hauschildt returned to competition later in the year. She eventually regained fitness to win the Asia-Pacific 70.3 Championships in Western Sydney and backed it up with a win at Ironman Western Australia in December for the second year in a row.

2018 continued with wins at the Port of Tauranga Half Ironman in New Zealand and Ironman 70.3 Texas. In April, Hauschildt won the Ironman North American Championships setting a new Ironman brand record of 8:31:05, breaking the previous record of 8:33:56 set by Chrissie Wellington in 2011. She became the first and only triathlete in history to win gold at three different regional Ironman Championships in a career (Asia-Pacific Championships in Melbourne, European Championships in Frankfurt, and North American Championships in Texas). The win also continued her streak of five consecutive years of Ironman wins and nine consecutive years of at least one Regional, National or World Championship win each and every year. She continued on to win the Ironman 70.3 European Championship in Elsinore, Denmark and also raced the Ironman 70.3 Asia-Pacific Championships in the Philippines where she came third. During this race she was reduced to a walk as she battled with the claudication symptoms of artery endofibrosis on her right side. She subsequently had vein patch angioplasty surgery to her right external iliac artery in November 2018.

== Notable results ==
Hauschildt's notable career triathlon finishes, include:

Results list
- 2018 Ironman 70.3 Cebu – Asia Pacific Championships – 3rd
- 2018 Ironman 70.3 Denmark – European Championships – 1st
- 2018 Ironman Texas – North American Championships – 1st
- 2018 Ironman 70.3 Texas – 1st
- 2018 Tauranga Half Ironman. New Zealand – 1st
- 2017 Ironman Western Australia – 1st
- 2017 Ironman 70.3 West Sydney – Asia Pacific Championships – 1st
- 2017 Ironman World Championships – 14th
- 2017 Ironman 70.3 World Championships – 10th
- 2017 ITU Long Distance World Championships – 9th
- 2016 Ironman Western Australia – 1st
- 2016 Ironman World Championship – DNF
- 2016 Ironman 70.3 World Championship – 2nd
- 2016 Ironman 70.3 European Championship – 1st
- 2016 Ironman European Championship – 1st
- 2016 Husky Long Course Tri – 1st
- 2016 Ironman 70.3 Geelong – Australian Championships – 1st
- 2015 Ironman Melbourne – Asia Pacific Championships – 1st
- 2015 Challenge Melbourne – 1st
- 2014 Challenge Bahrain – 6th
- 2014 Challenge Phuket – 1st
- 2014 Noosa Triathlon – 7th
- 2014 Ironman 70.3 World Championship- DNF
- 2014 Hy Vee 5150 Championship – 5th
- 2014 Ironman 70.3 Timberman – 1st
- 2014 Ironman 70.3 Racine – 1st
- 2014 Ironman 70.3 Vineman – 2nd
- 2014 Ironman Australia – 1st
- 2014 Abu Dhabi International Triathlon – 1st
- 2014 Challenge Philippines – 1st
- 2013 Challenge Laguna Phuket – 1st
- 2013 Laguna Phuket Triathlon – 1st
- 2013 Ironman 70.3 Mandurah – 1st
- 2013 Noosa Triathlon – 3rd
- 2013 Ironman 70.3 Augusta – 1st
- 2013 Ironman 70.3 Cozumel – 2nd
- 2013 Ironman 70.3 World Championship – 1st
- 2013 Hy Vee 5150 Championship – 2nd
- 2013 Ironman 70.3 Timberman – 1st
- 2013 Ironman 70.3 Boulder, Colorado, USA – 1st
- 2013 ITU Long Distance World Championships, France – 1st
- 2013 Koh Samui International Triathlon – 1st
- 2013 Abu Dhabi International Triathlon – 1st
- 2013 Australian Long Course Championships – 1st
- 2012 Ironman 70.3 Phuket, Thailand – 1st
- 2012 Noosa Triathlon – 7th
- 2012 Ironman 70.3 Mandurah – 1st
- 2012 Ironman 70.3 Augusta – 1st
- 2012 Ironman 70.3 Cozumel – 2nd
- 2012 Ironman 70.3 World Championships – 4th
- 2012 Hy-Vee Triathlon – 5th
- 2012 Ironman 70.3 Boulder – 2nd
- 2012 Ironman 70.3 Vineman – 2nd
- 2012 Boulder Peak Triathlon 5150 – 2nd
- 2012 Byron Bay Triathlon – 1st
- 2012 Abu Dhabi International Triathlon – 4th
- 2012 Australian Long Course Championships – 1st
- 2011 Ironman 70.3 Asia Pacific Championships – 1st
- 2011 Nepean Triathlon – 1st
- 2011 Noosa Triathlon – 1st
- 2011 Ironman 70.3 World Championships – 1st
- 2011 Ironman 70.3 Steelhead – 1st
- 2011 Ironman 70.3 Vineman – 1st
- 2011 Ironman 70.3 Muncie – 1st
- 2010 Gatorade QLD triathlon series – 1st
- 2010 Ironman 70.3 Asia Pacific Championship – 2nd
- 2010 Napean Elite Sprint Triathlon – 1st
- 2010 Napean Triathlon – 2nd
- 2010 Noosa Triathlon – 5th
- 2010 Gatorade QLD triathlon series – 1st
- 2010 Gold Coast Half Ironman – 1st
- 2010 Kingscliffe Triathlon – 1st
