= Heather Jackson =

American triathlete and track cyclist

Personal information
- Born: April 24, 1984 (age 42) Exeter, New Hampshire
- Height: 5 ft 4 in (1.63 m)
- Weight: 125 lb (57 kg)

Sport
- Country: United States
- Sport: Triathlon
- Team: Wattie Ink. Elite Team
- Turned pro: 2009
- Coached by: Joe Gambles
Medal record
Representing United States
Women's track cycling
Elite Track Cycling National Championships
| Bronze medal – third place | 2009 Individual Pursuit | Elite |
| Bronze medal – third place | 2009 Omnium | Elite |
Women's triathlon
Ironman Triathlon World Championships
| Bronze medal – third place | 2016 | Individual |
Ironman 70.3
| Silver medal – second place | 2013 | Elite |
| Bronze medal – third place | 2012 | Elite |

Heather Jackson (born April 24, 1984) is an American triathlete and track cyclist. She is the runner-up of the 2013 Ironman 70.3 World Championship and the third-place finisher at the 2012 Ironman 70.3 World Championship. In 2009, she took third place in individual pursuit and omnium at the USA Cycling Elite Track National Championships.

== Athletic career ==
Growing up in Exeter, New Hampshire, from the age of 6, Jackson focused on playing ice hockey and soccer, attending Phillips Exeter Academy. Despite wanting to play both sports at the collegiate level, she would focus on hockey and play on the women's team at Princeton University, serving as a two-time captain. She excelled enough to try out for the under-22 national ice hockey team and was invited to train with the candidates for the team, but ultimately did not make the final team roster. She graduated from college in 2006 with a degree in political science and East Asian studies and moved to Chiang Mai, Thailand, in 2007 to teach English at a private school. There she met some people training for Ironman Malaysia and competed with them in the Ironman competition.

After a year overseas, Jackson returned to the U.S. and competed in Ironman Lake Placid in July 2007 as an amateur age grouper in which she placed 10th qualifying her for that year's Ironman World Championship. In 2008, she obtained a position teaching 9th grade world history at the Harker School in San Jose, California. Here she began training with Team Alcis, a group of elite age group triathletes. She again qualified for the Ironman World Championship as an amateur, and won her 18-24 age group category. However, she became more involved in track cycling, where she would make the USA Olympic team and train with them in Los Angeles. At the national competition in October 2009, Jackson placed third in individual pursuit and third in the omnium. Because of the difficulty getting sponsors in women's track cycling and the removal of individual pursuit from the Olympic program, Jackson made the complete transition over to the triathlon.

Jackson initially focused on Ironman 70.3 distance races as a professional triathlete, where her top finish in 2009 was a second place at the Ironman 70.3 Austin race. The next year she placed 5th at the 2010 Ironman 70.3 World Championship and then improved her placing the following year with a 4th place at the 2011 Ironman 70.3 World Championship. Jackson continued her career in triathlon with improved race results which included a first place at the competitive Wildflower Triathlon, where she set a new long course record. She then secured a podium spot with a third place at 2012 Ironman 70.3 World Championship. The following year she continued to improve her successive year-over-year performance, placing 2nd at the 2013 Ironman 70.3 World Championship.

In 2014 Jackson won her third straight Wildflower Triathlon. She was unable to continue her year-over-year improvement at the 2014 Ironman 70.3 World Championship and instead placed 13th at the event. In November of that year she raced in her first full-distance triathlon at Ironman Arizona where she took third place.

In 2015, Jackson missed a four-peat at the Wildflower triathlon by three seconds. She then raced Ironman Texas, where she finished a disappointing 11th place. However, she rebounded to win her first full iron distance race at Ironman Coeur d'Alene, overcoming an 8-minute deficit out of the swim to beat opponents Amanda Stevens and Kim Schwabenbauer. Coeur d'Alene was unusually hot for the 2015 race, which started an hour early due to the heat. In her Ironman World Championship debut Jackson placed fifth despite beginning the run in 14th position. On July 24, 2016, she won Ironman Lake Placid in a female course record time of 9:09:42.

== Notable results ==
Jackson's notable career triathlon finishes include:

Results list
- 2022 Ironman Lake Placid - 2nd
- 2021 Ironman Florida - 1st
- 2019 Ironman 70.3 Coeur d'Alene - 1st
- 2019 Ironman 70.3 Chattanooga - 1st
- 2019 Ironman 70.3 St. George - 8th
- 2019 Ironman 70.3 Oceanside - 5th
- 2018 Ironman Arizona - 1st
- 2018 Ironman World Championship - 14th
- 2018 Ironman Lake Placid - 1st
- 2018 Wildflower Triathlon - 1st
- 2017 Ironman World Championship - 4th
- 2017 Ironman Boulder - 2nd
- 2017 Ironman 70.3 Steelhead - 1st
- 2017 Ironman 70.3 Calgary - 1st
- 2017 Ironman 70.3 Peru - 1st
- 2017 Ironman 70.3 Chattanooga - 1st
- 2017 Ironman 70.3 Oceanside - 4th
- 2016 Ironman World Championship - 3rd
- 2016 Ironman Lake Placid - 1st
- 2016 Ironman 70.3 Coeur d'Alene - 1st
- 2016 Escape from Alcatraz - 7th
- 2016 Ironman 70.3 Chattanooga - 1st
- 2016 Ironman 70.3 Oceanside - 3rd
- 2015 Ironman World Championship - 5th
- 2015 Ironman Coeur d'Alene - 1st
- 2015 Wildflower Triathlon - 2nd
- 2015 Ironman 70.3 Oceanside - 1st
- 2014 Ironman Arizona - 3rd
- 2014 Ironman 70.3 World Championship - 13th
- 2014 Wildflower Triathlon - 1st
- 2014 Ironman 70.3 Princeton - 1st
- 2014 Ironman 70.3 Oceanside - 2nd
- 2013 Ironman 70.3 World Championship - 2nd
- 2013 Escape from Alcatraz Triathlon - 1st
- 2013 Wildflower Triathlon - 1st
- 2013 Ironman 70.3 Oceanside - 1st
- 2012 XTERRA Triathlon World Championship - 4th
- 2012 Ironman 70.3 World Championship - 3rd
- 2012 Wildflower Triathlon - 1st
- 2012 Ironman 70.3 Oceanside - 2nd
- 2012 Ironman 70.3 Calgary - 2nd
- 2011 Ironman 70.3 World Championship - 4th
- 2011 Ironman 70.3 Oceanside - 2nd
- 2010 Ironman 70.3 World Championship - 5th
- 2010 Ironman 70.3 Steelhead - 2nd
- 2009 Ironman 70.3 Austin - 2nd
- 2008 Ironman World Championships - 1st 18-24 amateur age group
