= Anna Cleaver =

New Zealand triathlete

Anna Cleaver (born 1981 or 1982) is a professional triathlete from New Zealand.

== Life and career ==
Born and raised in Auckland, Cleaver was a top level swimmer, coached by Jan Cameron, in her teenage years. While studying at university she competed in Under-23 international triathlons.

After graduating, Cleaver began her working career in corporate finance. She moved to Sydney to work in merchant banking and later joined Telstra's finance department, specialising in mergers and acquisitions. While on holiday in Hawaii she watched an Ironman event and decided to return to competitive triathlons.

In 2012, she was hit by a car and trailer in an accident while training in Boulder, Colorado but recovered and continued to compete. Since 2013 she has competed in Ironman Triathlons around the world; in her first Ironman, in Melbourne, she placed seventh, and in 2014 she placed fifth in the Canada Ironman Championships. In 2013, she moved to Chattanooga, Tennessee, to train and compete.
