= Lisa Mensink =

Dutch triathlete

Lisa Mensink (born in Winnipeg, Manitoba) is a Dutch triathlete.

Mensink has a dual nationality and performed the first years of her career for the Canadian national team in national and international competitions. As of 2007 she competes for the Netherlands. In her mission to qualify for the 2008 Summer Olympics in Beijing she achieved a 9th position in a Triathlon World Cup meeting in South Korea to win her Olympic nomination. She needed another top-10 classification before the deadline to change the nomination into a ticket to China. She came close in New Zealand (11th) and Japan (12th), but came just too short. Her last chance was at the meeting in Hamburg, Germany on July 8, 2008. She managed to finish in 9th position and took the ticket to the Olympics.
