= Danne Boterenbrood =

Dutch professional triathlete

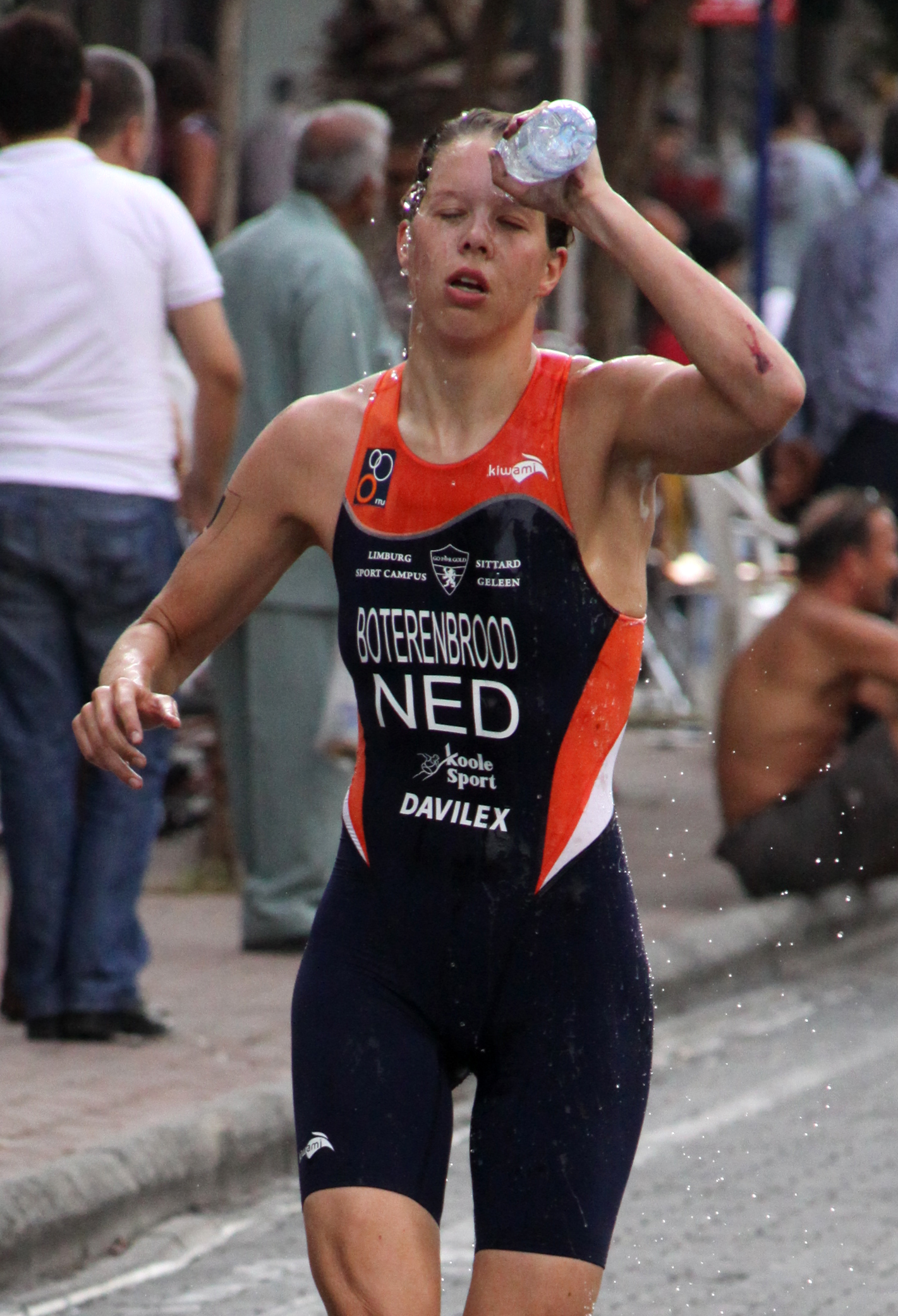
Danne Boterenbrood at the Premium European Cup in Alanya, 2009.

Danne Boterenbrood (born 19 July 1985 in Zwolle, Netherlands), is a Dutch professional triathlete.

Boterenbrood studied medicine at the University of Groningen and lives with her friend in Sittard where the National Training Centre has been established. She teaches at the Faculty of Medicine of the University of Maastricht and represents the Dutch clubs GSTV Tritanium and AV Unitas.

In 2009 Boterenbrood represented the club Lemgo in the German Bundesliga circuit.

In 2009 Boterenbrood also took part in the prestigious French Club Championship Series Lyonnaise des Eaux and, together with international elite stars like Emma Moffatt and Olga Dmitrieva she represented the French club Charleville Tri Ardennes. In 2010, the club still lists her name among its elite triathletes, but Boterenbrood did not take part in any of the Lyonnaise triathlons. In La Baule at the Grand Final of the Lyonnaise circuit of the year 2009 Boterenbrood placed 30th and was the third best triathlete of her club.

In 2011, after a year in which Boterenbrood was almost completely absent from triathlon events, she is on leave from Maastricht University to fully dedicate herself to triathlon again and qualify for the 2012 London Olympics.

== ITU Competitions ==
From 2004 to 2010 Boterenbrood took part in 17 ITU triathlons and achieved three top ten positions. The following list is based upon the official ITU rankings and the Athlete's Profile Page. Unless indicated otherwise, the following events are triathlons (Olympic Distance) and belong to the Elite category.

Date	Competition	Place	Rank
2004-07-03	European Championships (Junior)	Lausanne	34
2005-07-16	Premium European Cup (Elite)	Holten	0
2006-07-08	European Championships (U23)	Rijeka	25
2006-07-15	Premium European Cup (Elite)	Holten	15
2006-07-30	European Cup (Elite)	Copenhagen	8
2006-08-20	European Cup (Elite)	Geneva	DNF
2006-09-02	World Championships (U23)	Lausanne	31
2008-05-18	European Cup (Elite)	Brno	21
2008-06-28	Premium European Cup (Elite)	Holten	DNS
2008-09-06	European Championships (U23)	Pulpì	28
2008-09-13	European Cup (Elite)	Vienna	17
2009-07-02	European Championships (Elite)	Holten	23
2009-08-02	European Cup (Elite)	Egirdir	11
2009-08-09	European Cup (Elite)	Tiszaújváros	21
2009-08-23	European Cup	Karlovy Vary (Carlsbad)	8
2009-10-25	Premium European Cup	Alanya	26
2010-11-13	Premium European Cup	Eilat	3
2011-01-09	Pan American Cup	Viña del Mar	1

DNF = did not finish
