= 2016 Ironman World Championship =

Ironman World Championship
- Location: Kailua-Kona, Hawaii
- Date: October 8, 2016

Champions
- Men: (Germany) Jan Frodeno
- Women: (Switzerland) Daniela Ryf

The 2016 Ironman World Championship was a long distance triathlon competition that was held on October 8, 2016 in Kailua-Kona, Hawaii. It was won by Jan Frodeno of Germany and Daniela Ryf of Switzerland, both repeat champions from 2015. The race was the 40th edition of the Ironman World Championship, which has been held annually in Hawaii since 1978. The championship was organized by the World Triathlon Corporation (WTC) and awarded a total purse prize of $650,000.

== Championship results ==
=== Men ===
Rank	Time (h:mm:ss)	Name	Country	Split times (h:mm:ss / m:ss)				
Rank	Time (h:mm:ss)	Name	Country	Swim	T1	Bike	T2	Run
1st place, gold medalist(s)	8:06:30	Jan Frodeno	Germany	48:02	1:52	4:29:00	2:02	2:45:34
2nd place, silver medalist(s)	8:10:02	Sebastian Kienle	Germany	52:27	2:12	4:23:55	2:25	2:49:03
3rd place, bronze medalist(s)	8:11:14	Patrick Lange	Germany	48:57	1:51	4:37:49	2:10	2:39:45
4	8:13:00	Ben Hoffman	United States	48:55	2:00	4:28:06	2:43	2:51:45
5	8:13:25	Andreas Böcherer	Germany	48:10	2:27	4:28:07	2:36	2:52:05
6	8:16:20	Tim O'Donnell	United States	48:12	1:53	4:29:10	2:04	2:55:01
7	8:16:56	Boris Stein	Germany	54:10	1:55	4:23:04	2:28	2:55:19
8	8:20:30	Bart Aernouts	Belgium	53:58	2:09	4:32:37	3:02	2:48:44
9	8:21:51	Iván Raña	Spain	48:52	2:13	4:38:13	2:16	2:50:17
10	8:21:59	Frederik Van Lierde	Belgium	48:49	2:07	4:35:33	2:09	2:53:21

=== Women ===
Rank	Time (h:mm:ss)	Name	Country	Split times (h:mm:ss / m:ss)				
Rank	Time (h:mm:ss)	Name	Country	Swim	T1	Bike	T2	Run
1st place, gold medalist(s)	8:46:46	Daniela Ryf	Switzerland	52:50	2:16	4:52:26	2:23	2:56:51
2nd place, silver medalist(s)	9:10:30	Mirinda Carfrae	Australia	56:44	2:07	5:10:54	2:25	2:58:20
3rd place, bronze medalist(s)	9:11:32	Heather Jackson	United States	58:56	2:06	5:00:31	2:11	3:07:48
4	9:14:26	Anja Beranek	Germany	52:51	2:01	5:00:42	2:17	3:16:35
5	9:15:40	Kaisa Lehtonen	Finland	58:55	1:52	5:08:54	2:43	3:03:16
6	9:19:05	Michelle Vesterby	Denmark	52:53	2:09	5:09:05	2:31	3:12:27
7	9:22:31	Sarah Piampiano	United States	1:02:42	2:24	5:07:29	2:52	3:07:04
8	9:22:59	Åsa Lundström	Sweden	1:02:04	2:18	5:09:46	2:09	3:06:42
9	9:25:57	Lucy Gossage	United Kingdom	1:01:57	2:41	5:06:01	3:03	3:12:15
10	9:28:17	Carrie Lester	Australia	56:40	2:26	5:10:50	2:26	3:15:55

== Qualification ==
The division of athletes was divided into professional, age group, physically challenged, hand cycle, and military divisions.

=== Professional ===
For entry into the 2016 World Championship race professional triathletes qualified for the championship through a point system. Points were earned by competing in WTC sanctioned Ironman and Ironman 70.3 events throughout the qualifying year. For the 2016 championship race that period was August 30, 2015 to August 21, 2016. The top 50 male and top 35 female pros in points at the end of the qualifying year qualified to race in Kona. An athlete's five highest scoring races were counted in the point totals. At least one Ironman race must have been completed and only three Ironman 70.3 races counted towards an athlete's overall point total. Prior champions of a WTC Championship received an automatic entry for the Championship race for a period of five years after their last championship performance provided that they competed in at least one full-distance Ironman race during the qualifying year. Additionally, winners of the five regional Ironman championships received automatic qualification into the 2016 Ironman Championship. All automatic entries awarded did not count toward the number of available qualifying spots. The available prize money to professional triathletes for qualifying races ranged from $25,000 to $150,000, depending on the event.

In July 2015, WTC announced a pilot program for separate professional men and women only events for races in 2016. On four different dates separate races will be held with only females in the professional field and only males in the professional field, for a total of eight different events. This impacted two dates during the 2016 championship qualifying year, July 24, where the professional women raced at Ironman Lake Placid and the professional men raced Ironman Canada and August 20/21 where the women competed at Ironman Sweden and the men at Ironman Copenhagen. The program is based partly on feedback from female professionals who have stated that slower professional men (who start prior to the women) and age group men (who start after) interfere with the women's racing and tactics.

=== Amateur ===
Amateur athletes could qualify through a single performance at an Ironman event. Slots were allocated to each amateur age group category, male and female, with the number of slots given out based on that category's proportional representation of the overall field. Each age group category was tentatively allocated one qualifying spot in each qualifying event.

Other means of entry into the championship race could also be obtained through Ironman's Legacy program, or through the Ironman’s charitable eBay auction. Handcycle competitors, who are paraplegic, quadriplegic or double above-the-knee amputees and use a hand cranked cycle on the bike segment and racing chair for the run segment could also qualify at Ironman 70.3 Cairns (one male/one female), Ironman 70.3 Luxembourg (two male/one female), and Ironman 70.3 Buffalo Springs Lake (one male/one female)

WTC offered an Executive Challenge program, named Ironman XC, that provided the chance to qualify for the championship race via other select Ironman events. Entry into the program was done through an application process.

In December 2014, WTC announced a newly created military division for active duty personnel. The division was open to any active personnel, regardless of country or gender. Slots were allocated in a similar fashion to the normal age group qualification process with age group categories set at 18-29, 30-39 and 40+ for each gender. Three races were announced, with two impacting the 2016 qualifying period: Ironman 70.3 Superfrog (14 slots) and Ironman Cairns (10 Slots).

=== Qualifying Ironman races ===
Date	Event	Location
Aug 30, 2015	Ironman Vichy	Vichy, France
Aug 30, 2015	Ironman Muskoka^{x}	Muskoka, Canada
Sep 13, 2015	Ironman Wales	Tenby, Pembrokeshire, Wales
Sep 13, 2015	Ironman Wisconsin^{x}	(United States) Madison, Wisconsin
Sep 20, 2015	Ironman Lake Tahoe^{x}	(United States) Lake Tahoe, California
Sep 26, 2015	Ironman Mallorca	Alcúdia, Mallorca, Spain
Sep 27, 2015	Ironman Chattanooga	(United States) Chattanooga, Tennessee
Oct 3, 2015	Ironman Maryland^{x}	(United States) Cambridge, Maryland
Oct 4, 2015	Ironman Barcelona	Barcelona, Spain
Oct 10, 2015	Ironman World Championship	(United States) Kailua-Kona, Hawaii
Oct 11, 2015	Ironman Louisville^{x}	(United States) Louisville, Kentucky
Oct 25, 2015	Ironman Los Cabos^{x}	Los Cabos, Mexico
Nov 7, 2015	Ironman Florida^{x}	(United States) Panama City Beach, Florida
Nov 8, 2015	Ironman Fortaleza^{x}	Fortaleza, Brazil
Nov 14, 2015	Ironman Malaysia	Langkawi, Malaysia
Nov 15, 2015	Ironman Arizona	(United States) Tempe, Arizona
Nov 29, 2015	Ironman Cozumel	Cozumel, Quintana Roo, Mexico
Dec 6, 2015	Ironman Western Australia	Busselton, Western Australia
Mar 5, 2016	Ironman New Zealand	Taupō, New Zealand
Apr 10, 2016	Ironman African Championship	Port Elizabeth, South Africa
May 1, 2016	Ironman Australia	(Australia) Port Macquarie, New South Wales
May 14, 2016	Ironman North American Championship	(United States) The Woodlands Township, Texas
May 21, 2016	Ironman Lanzarote	Puerto del Carmen, Lanzarote, Spain
May 29, 2016	Ironman South American Championship	Florianópolis, Brazil
Jun 5, 2016	Ironman France	Nice, France
Jun 12, 2016	Ironman Asia- Pacific Championship^{*}	(Australia) Cairns, Queensland
Jun 26, 2016	Ironman Austria	Klagenfurt, Austria
Jul 3, 2016	Ironman European Championship	Frankfurt, Germany
Jul 17, 2016	Ironman UK	Bolton, Greater Manchester, United Kingdom
Jul 24, 2016	Ironman Switzerland	Zürich, Switzerland
Jul 24, 2016	Ironman Lake Placid^{w}	(United States) Lake Placid, New York
Jul 24, 2016	Ironman Canada^{m}	(Canada) Whistler, British Columbia
Jul 30, 2016	Ironman Vineman	(United States) Windsor, California
Jul 31, 2016	Ironman Maastricht-Limburg	Maastricht, Limburg, Netherlands
Aug 7, 2016	Ironman Boulder^{x}	(United States) Boulder, Colorado
Aug 20, 2016	Ironman Sweden^{w}	Kalmar, Sweden
Aug 21, 2016	Ironman Copenhagen^{m}	Copenhagen, Denmark
Aug 21, 2016	Ironman Mont Tremblant	Mont-Tremblant, Quebec, Canada
Aug 21, 2016	Ironman Coeur d'Alene^{x}	(United States) Coeur d'Alene, Idaho

*Asia-Pacific Championship was moved from Melbourne to Cairns after local Melbourne officials canceled the race due to an F1 event on the same day.
^{x} Amateur only competition.
^{m} Professional men's field
^{w} Professional women's field
