= Joe Gambles =

Australian triathlete

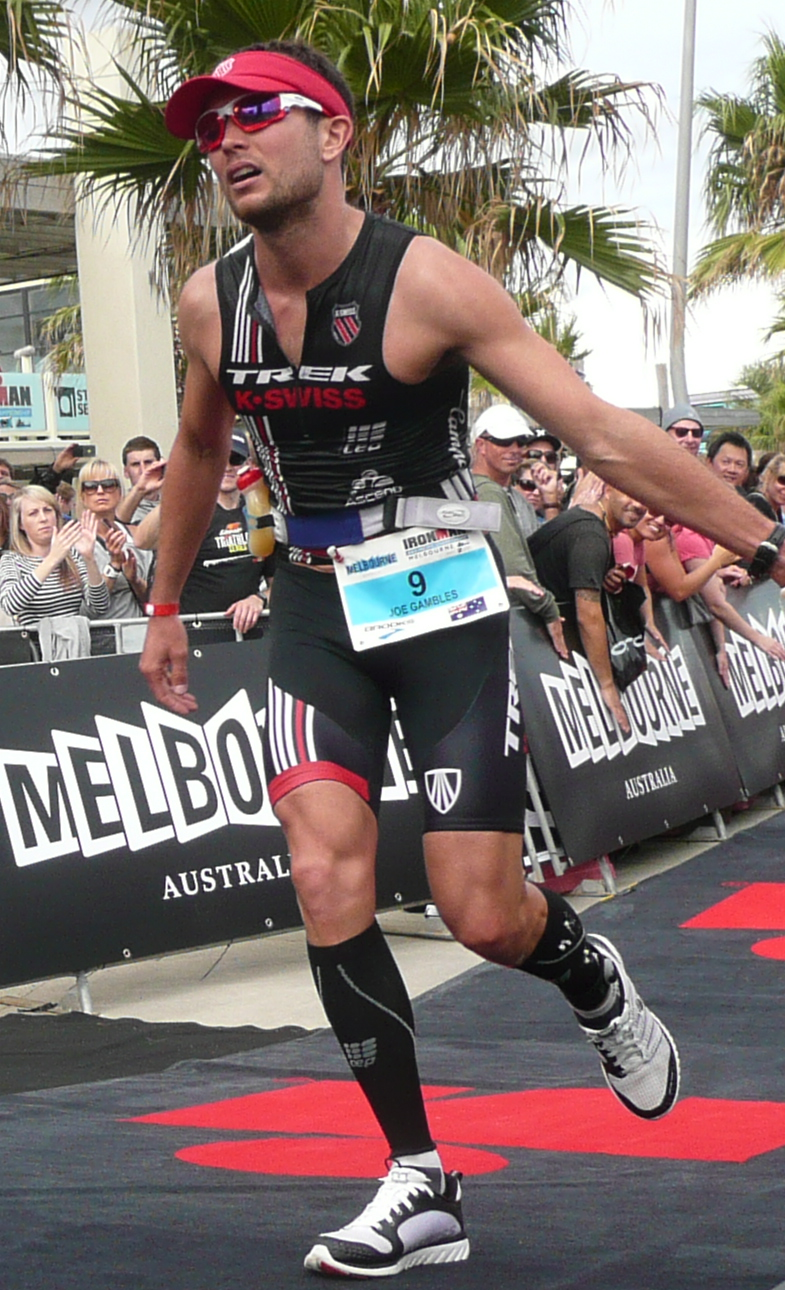
- Joe Gambles finishing at Ironman Melbourne 2012

Personal information
- Born: 16 January 1982 (age 44) Burton upon Trent, England
- Height: 1.75 m (5 ft 9 in)
- Weight: 67 kg (148 lb)

Sport
- Country: Australia
- Turned pro: 2000
Medal record
Representing Australia
Triathlon
Ironman 70.3
Bronze medal – third place	2013	Individual
ITU Long Distance World Championships
Silver medal – second place	2011	Individual
Bronze medal – third place	2017	Individual

Joseph Coyne Gambles (born 16 January 1982) is an Australian professional triathlete from Launceston, Tasmania. He races in long distance, non-drafting triathlon events. In 2011 he placed second at the ITU Long Distance Triathlon World Championships and in 2013 he finished third at the Ironman 70.3 World Championship.

== Career ==
Gambles was born in Burton upon Trent, Staffordshire, England, and moved to Australia at age three with his family. Athletically, he began running in local clubs at five or six years old. He competed in his first triathlon at 13 and won before taking triathlon seriously at age 15 once he joined the Australian junior development program. He raced as a professional for the first time at 16 as a "wildcard" before competing as an elite age group athlete for two seasons, winning each race he entered. This success culminated in the 2000 World Championships when Joe took second in the 16- to 19-year-old category. These results made Gambles the Australian Junior Triathlete of the year. From 2001 to 2004, Gambles focused on obtaining his Bachelor of Commerce at university while still competing in events in Australia, including the Triathlon Australia Accenture Series. After graduating, he became a full-time athlete.

Gambles would transition from draft legal to non-drafting races, a style of racing that better suited him, particularly half-iron and iron-distances. Among his other successes he has won Ironman 70.3 Boulder for five time (2011 - 2014, 2016), a win in his Ironman debut at Wisconsin in 2010, a 2008 victory at the European Long Distance Triathlon Championships as a competitor for Great Britain, and a course record holder for 10 different half-iron distance courses.

== Notable results ==
Gambles' notable race results include:

Results list

Year	Event	Place
2019	Ironman Lake Placid	2nd
2019	Ironman 70.3 Eagleman	1st
2019	Ironman 70.3 Steelhead	2nd
2018	Ironman Boulder	2nd
2018	Ironman 70.3 Indian Wells	2nd
2018	Ironman 70.3 Waco	3rd
2018	Ironman 70.3 Los Cabos	3rd
2018	Ironman 70.3 Santa Rosa	5th
2018	Ironman 70.3 Chattanooga	5th
2018	Ironman 70.3 St. George	7th
2017	Ironman Cairns	2nd
2017	Ironman 70.3 Santa Rosa	2nd
2017	ITU Long Distance World Championships	3rd
2017	Ironman 70.3 Racine	3rd
2017	Ironman 70.3 Steelhead	3rd
2017	Ironman 70.3 Western Sydney	5th
2017	Ironman 70.3 St. George	7th
2017	Ironman 70.3 Oceanside	8th
2016	Ironman Arizona	7th
2016	Ironman 70.3 World Championship	15th
2016	Ironman 70.3 Boulder	1st
2016	Ironman 70.3 St. George	3rd
2016	Ironman 70.3 Oceanside	14th
2015	Ironman 70.3 World Championship	16th
2015	ITU Long Distance World Championships	7th
2015	Challenge Dubai	10th
2014	Challenge Roth	4th
2014	Ironman 70.3 Boulder	1st
2014	Ironman St. George	4th
2014	Ironman Lake Tahoe	3rd
2013	Ironman 70.3 World Championship	3rd
2013	Ironman 70.3 Boulder	1st
2013	Ironman 70.3 Syracuse	1st
2013	Rev3 Quassy	1st
2012	Ironman 70.3 Timberman	1st
2012	Ironman 70.3 Boulder	1st
2012	Ironman 70.3 Vineman	2nd
2012	Ironman 70.3 Syracuse	1st
2011	Ironman 70.3 Boulder	1st
2011	Ironman 70.3 Port Macquarie	1st
2011	ITU Long Distance World Championships	3rd
2011	Ironman 70.3 World Championship	5th
2010	Ironman Wisconsin	1st
2010	Ironman 70.3 World Championship	4th
2010	Ironman 70.3 Lake Stevens	1st
2010	Wildflower Triathlon	2nd
2009	Ironman 70.3 Vineman	1st
2009	Ironman 70.3 Lake Stevens	1st
2009	Ironman 70.3 World Championship	5th
2008	European Long Distance Triathlon Championships	1st
