= Jesse Thomas (triathlete) =

American professional triathlete

Personal information
- Born: February 28, 1980 (age 45); Bend, Oregon, United States
- Height: 73 in (185 cm)
- Weight: 174 lb (79 kg)
- Spouse: Lauren Fleshman

Sport
- Sport: Triathlon

Jesse Thomas (born 28 February 1980 in Bend, Oregon) is an American professional triathlete, who has won several Ironman and Ironman 70.3 competitions.

He is married to former professional runner Lauren Fleshman.

== Major results ==
Year	Competition	Country	Place	Time
2017	Ironman 70.3 Augusta	United States	1st place, gold medalist(s)	3h 42' 14"
2017	Ironman 70.3 Pérou	Peru	2nd place, silver medalist(s)	3h 45' 21"
2016	Ironman Lanzarote	Spain	1st place, gold medalist(s)	8h 42' 33"
2016	Wildflower Triathlon	United States	1st place, gold medalist(s)	4h 5' 32"
2015	Ironman Pays de Galles	United Kingdom	1st place, gold medalist(s)	8h 57' 33"
2015	Wildflower Triathlon	United States	1st place, gold medalist(s)	4h 10' 2"
2014	Wildflower Triathlon	United States	1st place, gold medalist(s)	
2014	Ironman 70.3 Mont-Tremblant	Canada	1st place, gold medalist(s)	
2013	Wildflower Triathlon	United States	1st place, gold medalist(s)	4h 2' 19"
2013	Ironman 70.3 Californie	United States	2nd place, silver medalist(s)	3h 49' 55"
2012	Wildflower Triathlon	United States	1st place, gold medalist(s)	3h 58' 59"
2012	Rev3 Maine	United States	1st place, gold medalist(s)	1h 48' 33"
2012	Rev3 Floride	United States	1st place, gold medalist(s)	3h 26' 17"
2012	Ironman 70.3 Poconos	United States	1st place, gold medalist(s)	3h 49' 41"
2011	Wildflower Triathlon	United States	1st place, gold medalist(s)	4h 4' 45"
2011	Ironman 70.3 Philippines	Philippines	2nd place, silver medalist(s)	4h 12' 30"
