= Andrew Starykowicz =

American triathlete

Personal information
- Nationality: American
- Born: April 14, 1982 (age 44) Long Grove, Illinois
- Education: Purdue University
- Height: 6 ft 2 in (1.88 m)
- Weight: 185 lb (84 kg)

Sport
- Country: United States
- Sport: Triathlon
- Turned pro: 2006

Andrew Starykowicz (born April 14, 1982) is an American professional long-distance triathlete from Chicago, Illinois. He holds the Ironman bike split record at 3:54:59 and the Ironman 70.3 World Championship bike split record from the 2009 race.

Starykowicz attended Purdue University where he earned a B.S. in Mechanical Engineering and played on the water polo team. He was also named an All-American in swimming and triathlon while in college. Starykowicz has won races at Ironman Florida, Ironman 70.3 Puerto Rico, Ironman 70.3 Steelhead, Rev3 South Carolina, and Rev3 Cedar Point. He won the inaugural Ironman 70.3 Waco.
