= Angela Naeth =

Canadian-American triathlete and gravel cyclist

Angela Elaine Naeth is a Canadian-American triathlete and gravel cyclist. She is known for her athletic achievements and efforts to create a supportive community for women in endurance sports.

== Achievements ==
In endurance racing:

- Multiple Ironman Champion
- 2018 Ironman North American Champion
- 8th place finish at the 2018 Ironman World Championships in Kailua-Kona, Hawai'i, with a time of 8:57:34
- 3 full Ironman wins, all under 9 hours
- 36 Ironman 70.3 podium finishes, including 19 titles
- 5+ Ironman podium finishes

In gravel and mountain biking:

- 2x Top 15 finish at Leadville 100 Mountain Bike Race (best time: 8:26)
- 2x Top 8 finish at Unbound Gravel
- 16th (2022) and 17th (2023) place finishes in the Lifetime Race Series Pro division

== Coaching and community involvement ==
Naeth is the founder of Angela Naeth Coaching, where she offers training programs for triathletes and cyclists.

In 2016, she founded IRACELIKEAGIRL, a global community supporting women in triathlon and running. The community is inclusive of all ages and abilities, offering monthly challenges, team events, and daily support. She later expanded this initiative to include GirlsGetGritty, focusing on women's participation in gravel cycling. GirlsGetGritty aims to address gender disparity in events like Unbound Gravel.

== Personal life ==
Naeth holds dual citizenship in Canada and the United States.
