= Melanie McQuaid =

Canadian triathlete

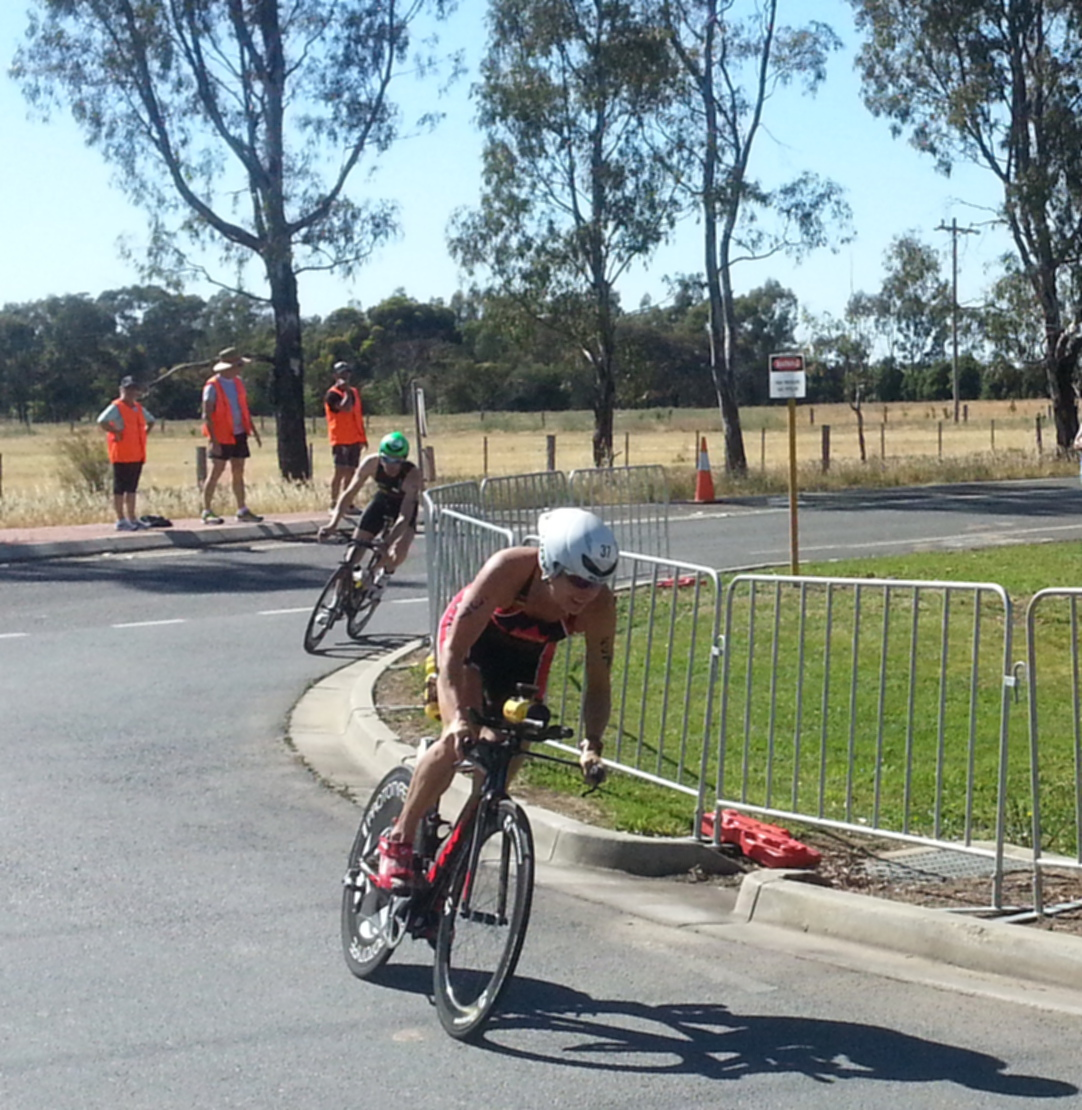
- McQuaid at Ironman 70.3 Shepparton, November 2013

Personal information
- Nickname: Racer Girl
- Born: May 17, 1973 (age 53) Victoria, British Columbia
- Height: 1.72 m (5 ft 8 in)
- Weight: 62 kg (137 lb)

Sport
- Country: Canada
- Sport: Triathlon
- Coached by: Kelly Guest/Self-coached
Medal record
Representing Canada
Women's triathlon
XTERRA Triathlon World Championship
Gold medal – first place	2006	Overall
Gold medal – first place	2005	Overall
Gold medal – first place	2003	Overall
Silver medal – second place	2007	Overall
Silver medal – second place	2004	Overall
Silver medal – second place	2000	Overall
Bronze medal – third place	2009	Overall
ITU Cross Triathlon World Championship
Gold medal – first place	2017	Overall
Gold medal – first place	2011	Overall
Silver medal – second place	2012	Overall

Melanie McQuaid (born May 17, 1973) is a Canadian triathlete. Competing in primarily XTERRA Triathlon, or cross triathlon, she has won three XTERRA World Championships as well as the ITU Cross Triathlon World Championship in 2011 and 2017. McQuaid also races in half-iron and Ironman 70.3 triathlon events, with half a dozen wins at this distance.

== Career ==
McQuaid was born and raised in Victoria, British Columbia. She competed in swimming while in high school and ran while attending the University of Victoria, earning her degree in biochemistry and chemistry. She next pursued a professional career in road cycling and mountain biking after being offered many opportunities in cycling as a beginning woman cyclist. She raced her first World Cup race in 1998, but after not making the Canadian mountain bike team for the 2000 Olympics, and growing tired of the repetitiveness of the single sport, McQuaid began competing in XTERRA triathlon. She found that these events suited her perfectly because of her athletic background and strengths.

The success McQuaid has found in XTERRA and cross triathlon has translated into more than 40 wins since 2001. She has been named Triathlete Magazine's Offroad Triathlete of the Year for 2005 and 2009. She was Triathlon Canada's Female Offroad Triathlete of the Year four times. In 2006 and 2008 she won the Offroad Triathlete of the Year award at the Competitor Magazine Endurance Sport Awards.
