= Radka Vodičková =

Czech triathlete

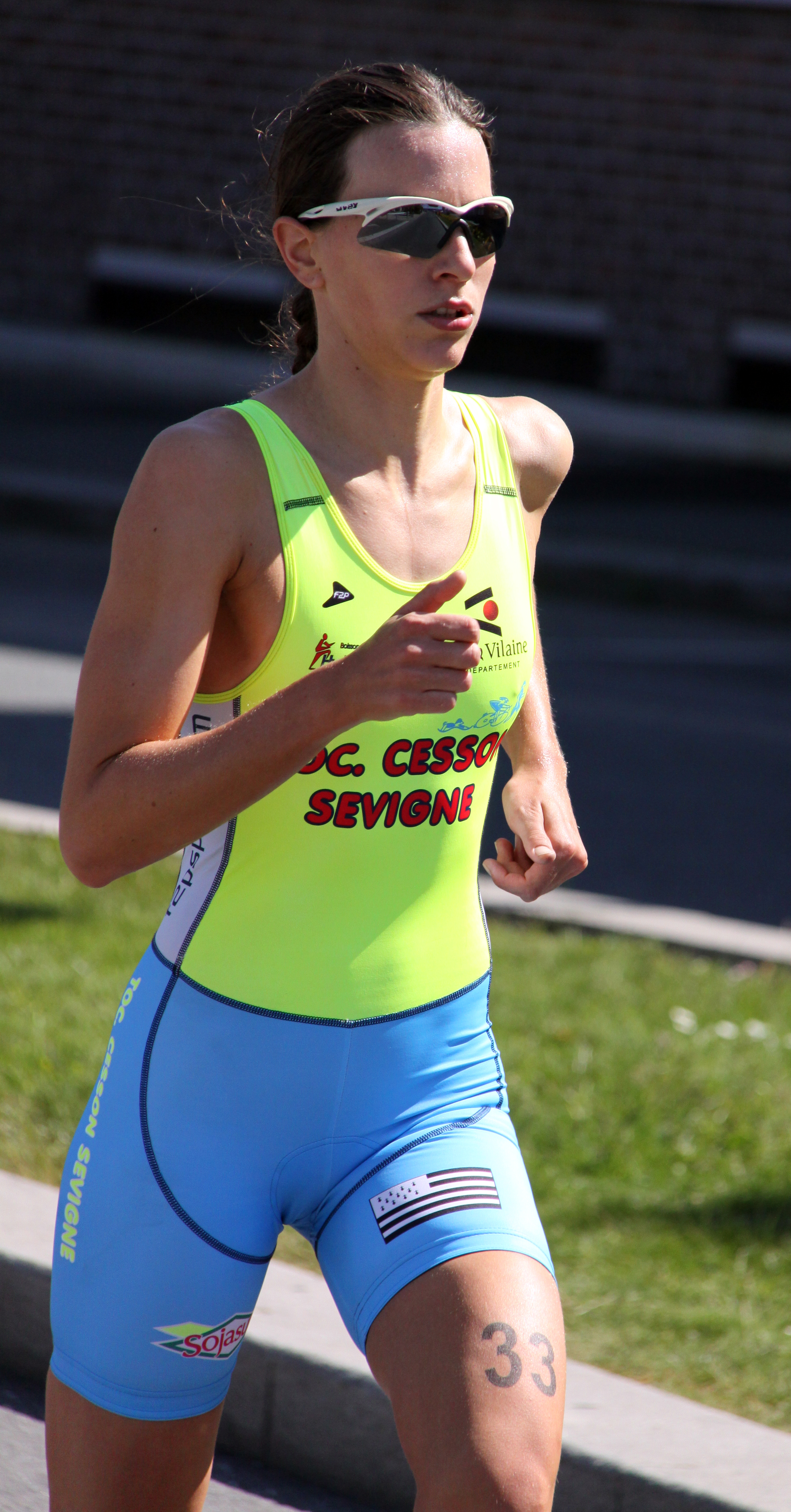
Radka Vodičková at the Triathlon in Dunkirk, 2010.

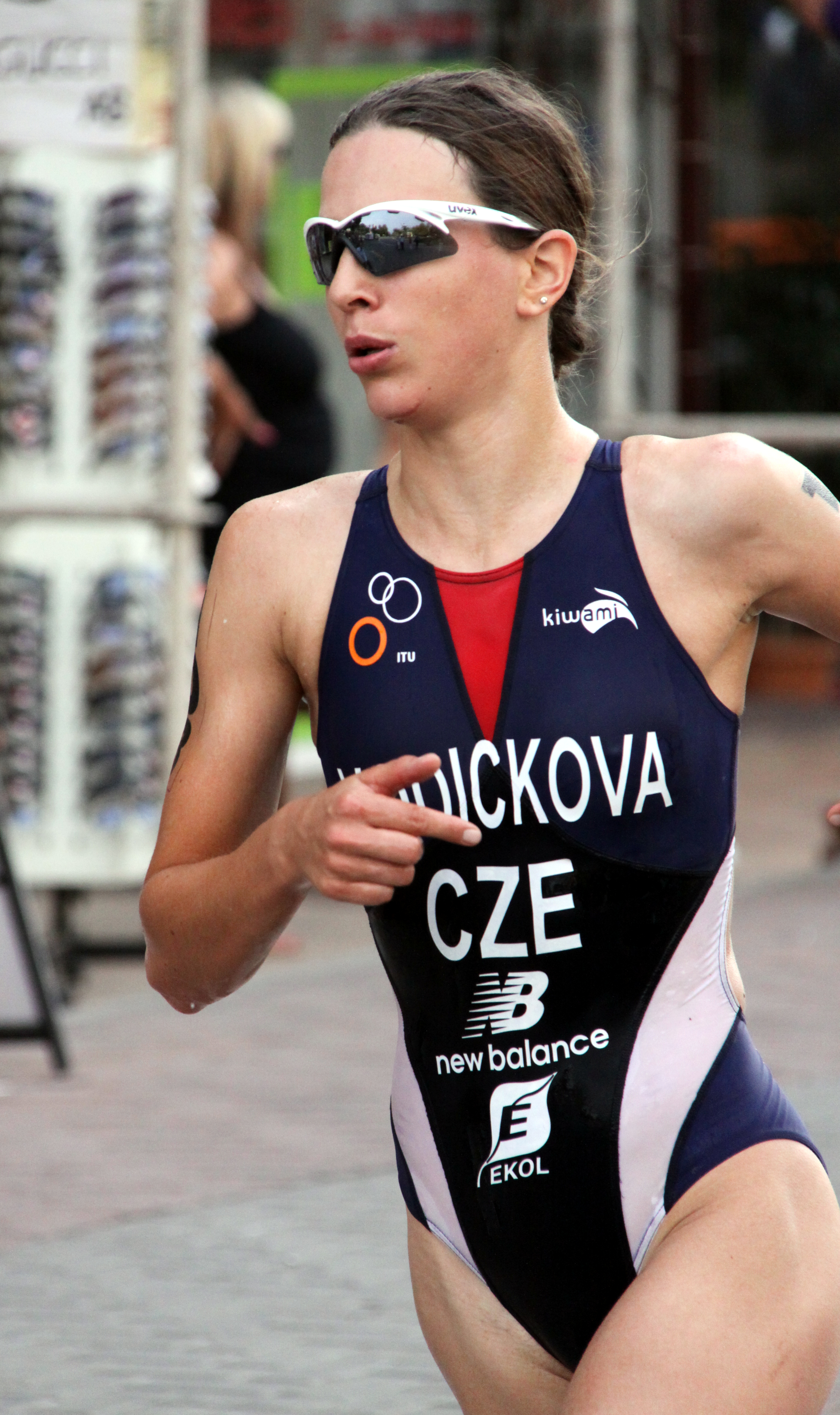
Radka Vodičková at the Alanya triathlon 2009.

Radka Vodičková (Czech pronunciation: [ˈratka ˈvoɟɪtʃkovaː]; born 7 November 1984 in Jablonec nad Nisou) is a Czech professional triathlete, number 1 according to the ETU ranking 2010, and member of the Czech National Team.

Radka Vodičková lives in Jablonec nad Nisou in the North of the Czech Republic and in Hellikon, Switzerland.

== Sports career ==
In the Czech Republic Radka Vodičková represents the elite club of Brno Ekol Team, where she also studies sports at Masaryk University. Since 2008 Radka Vodičková, like Daniela Ryf, is a member of the Wildcats Swiss Triathlon Team and in 2008 she won e.g. the Uster Triathlon and the Züri Triathlon, both part of the Swiss VW Circuit. Vodičková was also the overall winner of the VW Circuit of the year 2008.

In 2008, Vodičková also took also part in the German Bundesliga representing the Krefelder Kanu Klub, for which she won e.g. the silver medal at Schliersee, and in Spain she represented the Catalan club CN Reus Ploms, for which she won the Duatlón Villa Madrid in 2009.

Radka Vodičková also attends prestigious non ITU events outside Europe, e.g. in December 2009 she won the gold medal at the famous Laguna Phuket Triathlon, and she also placed first at the Powerman Malaysia.

== French Club Championship Series ==
In 2010, Radka Vodičková again took part in the prestigious French Club Championship Series Lyonnaise des Eaux, representing TRI Olympique Club Cessonais (= TOCC). At the opening triathlon in Dunkirk (23 May 2010), the only triathlon of the French circuit she attended in 2010, Radka Vodičková placed 30th and still proved to be the second best of her French club. TOCC is one of the D1 clubs which almost entirely relies upon its foreign elite stars. At the Triathlon de Paris it did not even have three triathlètes classants l'équipe and at only one of the five triathlons of the circuit it had at least one French female triathlete among the three triathlètes classants l'èquipe.

== ITU Competitions ==
In the eight years from 2003 to 2010, Radka Vodičková took part in 65 ITU competitions and achieved 38 top ten positions, among which 26 gold, silver and bronze medals.

Unless indicated otherwise the following competitions are triathlons (Olympic Distance) and belong to the Elite Category. The list is based upon the official ITU rankings and the Athlete's Profile Page.

Date	Competition	Place	Rank
2003-05-31	European Cup	Brno	13
2003-06-21	European Championships (Junior)	Karlovy Vary (Carlsbad)	5
2003-08-16	European Cup	Prague	10
2005-06-26	Asian Cup	Seorak	3
2005-07-17	European Championships (U23)	Sofia	11
2005-07-31	World Cup	Salford	28
2005-08-06	World Cup	Hamburg	27
2005-08-14	World Cup	Tiszaújváros	DNF
2005-10-26	Premium European Cup	Alanya	11
2006-03-04	Winter Triathlon European Championships (U23)	Schilpario	1
2006-05-27	Asian Cup	Yicheng	6
2006-06-03	Asian Cup	Tongyeong	3
2006-06-23	European Championships	Autun	25
2006-07-08	European Championships (U23)	Rijeka	14
2006-07-15	Premium European Cup	Holten	DNF
2006-07-23	Asian Cup	Jinzhou	3
2006-07-30	BG World Cup	Salford	42
2006-09-17	Premium European Cup	Kedzierzyn Kozle	9
2006-10-07	Duathlon European Championships ITU Series	Rimini	20
2006-10-07	Duathlon European Championships (U23)	Rimini	3
2007-02-09	Winter Triathlon European Championships (U23)	Triesenberg	DNS
2007-03-24	Duathlon Asian Championships	Mekong River	3
2007-03-25	Triathlon Asian Cup	Mekong River	5
2007-06-16	Duathlon European Championships	Edinburgh	2
2007-06-29	European Championships	Copenhagen	14
2007-07-07	Premium European Cup	Holten	2
2007-07-21	European Championships (U23)	Kuopio	5
2007-07-29	BG World Cup	Salford	23
2007-08-11	BG World Cup	Tiszaújváros	19
2007-08-30	BG World Championships	Hamburg	36
2007-09-09	Premium European Cup	Kedzierzyn Kozle	DNS
2007-10-07	BG World Cup	Rhodes	42
2008-05-10	European Championships	Lisbon	6
2008-05-18	European Cup	Brno	1
2008-05-24	Duathlon European Championships	Serres	1
2008-06-21	European Cup	Schliersee	2
2008-06-28	Premium European Cup	Holten	1
2008-07-20	BG World Cup	Kitzbühel	DNF
2008-08-03	European Cup	Egirdir	1
2008-09-07	Premium European Cup	Kedzierzyn Kozle	3
2008-09-27	Duathlon World Championships	Rimini	6
2009-04-05	European Cup	Quarteira	1
2009-05-17	Premium European Cup	Pontevedra	1
2009-08-15	Dextro Energy World Championship Series	London	DNF
2009-08-23	European Cup	Karlovy Vary (Carlsbad)	1
2009-08-30	Premium European Cup	Kedzierzyn Kozle	6
2009-09-26	European Cup	Mar Menor	2
2009-10-25	Premium European Cup	Alanya	4
2009-11-15	Asian Duathlon Championships	Subic Bay	1
2010-06-05	Dextro Energy World Championship Series	Madrid	28
2010-06-12	Premium European Cup	Pontevedra	2
2010-06-27	Premium European Cup	Brasschaat	4
2010-07-03	European Championships	Athlone	16
2010-07-10	World Cup	Holten	3
2010-07-17	Dextro Energy World Championship Series	Hamburg	DNF
2010-07-24	Dextro Energy World Championship Series	London	35
2010-08-08	World Cup	Tiszaújváros	18
2010-08-14	Dextro Energy World Championship Series	Kitzbuhel	27
2010-08-22	European Cup	Karlovy Vary (Carlsbad)	2
2010-08-29	Premium European Cup	Almere	2
2010-09-08	Dextro Energy World Championship Series, Grand Final	Budapest	38
2010-09-18	Asian Cup	I-Ian	1
2010-09-25	Long Distance World Series Event	Weihai	2
2010-10-16	World Cup	Tongyeong	8
2010-10-23	Asian Cup	Hong Kong	2

BG = the sponsor British Gas · DNF = did not finish · DNS = did not start
