= 2012 Ironman 70.3 World Championship =

Triathlon in Nevada, United States

The 2012 Ironman 70.3 World Championship was a triathlon competition held at Lake Las Vegas in Henderson, Nevada on September 9, 2012. The championship was sponsored by the United States Marine Corps and organized by the World Triathlon Corporation (WTC) and was the culmination of the Ironman 70.3 series of events that occurred from August 14, 2011 through August 13, 2012. Athletes, both professional and amateur, earned a spot in the championship race by qualifying in races throughout the 70.3 series.

== Medallists ==
=== Men ===
| Pos. | Time (h:mm:ss) | Name | Country | Split times (h:mm:ss) | | | | |
| Pos. | Time (h:mm:ss) | Name | Country | Swim | T1 | Bike | T2 | Run |
|---|---|---|---|---|---|---|---|---|
| Gold medal | 3:54:35* | Sebastian Kienle | Germany | 26:32 | 2:27 | 2:07:55 | 0:57 | 1:16:46 |
| Silver medal | 3:55:36 | Craig Alexander | Australia | 23:54 | 2:31 | 2:13:24 | 0:51 | 1:14:59 |
| Bronze medal | 3:56:25 | Bevan Docherty | New Zealand | 23:51 | 2:29 | 2:13:41 | 0:51 | 1:15:35 |
| 4 | 3:56:35 | Tim O'Donnell | United States | 23:28 | 2:27 | 2:14:03 | 0:48 | 1:15:52 |
| 5 | 3:56:54 | Andy Potts | United States | 23:20 | 2:32 | 2:13:55 | 0:53 | 1:16:16 |
| 6 | 4:01:17 | Bart Aernouts | Belgium | 26:30 | 2:39 | 2:13:03 | 0:56 | 1:18:11 |
| 7 | 4:02:30 | Josh Amberger | Australia | 23:16 | 2:41 | 2:13:48 | 0:55 | 1:21:52 |
| 8 | 4:03:11 | Michael Raelert | Germany | 23:30 | 2:24 | 2:19:31 | 0:43 | 1:17:06 |
| 9 | 4:03:27 | Faris Al-Sultan | Germany | 24:09 | 2:44 | 2:13:06 | 1:14 | 1:22:17 |
| 10 | 4:03:59 | Richie Cunningham | United States | 25:11 | 2:25 | 2:15:16 | 0:59 | 1:20:09 |
*Course record; Source:

=== Women ===
| Pos. | Time (h:mm:ss) | Name | Country | Split times (h:mm:ss) | | | | |
| Pos. | Time (h:mm:ss) | Name | Country | Swim | T1 | Bike | T2 | Run |
|---|---|---|---|---|---|---|---|---|
| Gold medal | 4:28:05 | Leanda Cave | Great Britain | 26:07 | 2:49 | 2:28:18 | 1:00 | 1:29:53 |
| Silver medal | 4:29:24 | Kelly Williamson | United States | 26:05 | 2:47 | 2:36:27 | 0:48 | 1:23:19 |
| Bronze medal | 4:32:32 | Heather Jackson | United States | 28:54 | 2:47 | 2:27:45 | 0:54 | 1:32:13 |
| 4 | 4:35:13 | Melissa Hauschildt | Australia | 28:44 | 2:59 | 2:29:32 | 0:55 | 1:33:05 |
| 5 | 4:36:08 | Joanna Lawn | New Zealand | 28:39 | 3:06 | 2:33:44 | 1:18 | 1:29:23 |
| 6 | 4:36:56 | Heather Wurtele | Canada | 28:17 | 3:05 | 2:34:50 | 0:58 | 1:29:48 |
| 7 | 4:37:03 | Magali Tisseyre | Canada | 28:34 | 3:02 | 2:34:45 | 1:15 | 1:29:28 |
| 8 | 4:37:15 | Julia Gajer | Germany | 28:35 | 2:49 | 2:34:30 | 1:07 | 1:30:16 |
| 9 | 4:37:40 | Margaret Shapiro | United States | 28:00 | 2:42 | 2:33:05 | 0:51 | 1:33:05 |
| 10 | 4:39:59 | Jeanne Collonge | France | 28:57 | 3:04 | 2:35:09 | 1:10 | 1:31:41 |

== Qualification ==
The 2012 Ironman 70.3 Series featured 57 events that enabled qualification to the 2012 World Championship event, many of which were making their first appearance in the series due to WTC's expansion of the 70.3 brand. Two of those events, Japan and Syracuse, appeared twice during the qualifying year due to changes in these event's positioning within the qualifying year.

Professional triathletes qualified for the championship race by competing in races during the qualifying period, earning points towards their pro rankings. An athlete’s five highest scoring races were counted toward their pro rankings. The top 50 males and top 30 females in the pro rankings qualified for the championship race. Professional athletes were also eligible for prize purses at each qualifying event, which ranged in total size from $15,000 to $75,000.

Amateur triathletes could qualify for the championship race by earning a qualifying slot at one of the qualifying events or through the Physically Challenged Lottery. At qualifying events, slots were allocated to each age group category, male and female, with the number of slots given out based on that category's proportional representation of the overall field. Each age group category would be tentatively allocated one qualifying spot in each qualifying event. Some 70.3 events also serve as qualifiers for the full Ironman World Championships in Hawaii.

=== Qualifying Ironman 70.3s ===
| Date | Event | Location |
|---|---|---|
| Aug 14, 2011 | Ironman 70.3 Yeppoon | (Australia) Yeppoon, Queensland |
| Aug 21, 2011 | Ironman 70.3 Timberman | (United States) Gilford, New Hampshire |
| Aug 27, 2011 | Ironman 70.3 Brazil | Penha, Brazil |
| Sep 4, 2011 | Ironman 70.3 Ireland | (Republic of Ireland) Galway, Ireland |
| Sep 11, 2011 | Ironman 70.3 Muskoka | Huntsville, Ontario, Canada |
| Sep 11, 2011 | Ironman 70.3 World Championship | (United States) Las Vegas, Nevada |
| Sep 18, 2011 | Ironman 70.3 Japan | Tokoname, Aichi, Japan |
| Sep 18, 2011 | Ironman 70.3 Cancún | Cancún, Mexico |
| Sep 18, 2011 | Ironman 70.3 Branson | (United States) Branson, Missouri |
| Sep 18, 2011 | Ironman 70.3 Syracuse | (United States) Syracuse, New York |
| Sep 25, 2011 | Ironman 70.3 Pays d’Aix | Aix-en-Provence, France |
| Sep 25, 2011 | Ironman 70.3 Augusta | (United States) Augusta, Georgia |
| Oct 2, 2011 | Ironman 70.3 Pocono Mountains | (United States) Stroudsburg, Pennsylvania |
| Oct 23, 2011 | Ironman 70.3 Austin | (United States) Austin, Texas |
| Oct 30, 2011 | Ironman 70.3 Miami | (United States) Miami, Florida |
| Nov 5, 2011 | Ironman 70.3 Taiwan | Hengchun, Taiwan |
| Nov 6, 2011 | Ironman 70.3 Port Macquarie | (Australia) Port Macquarie, New South Wales |
| Nov 13, 2011 | Ironman 70.3 Shepparton | (Australia) Shepparton, Victoria |
| Dec 4, 2011 | Ironman 70.3 Asia Pacific Championship^{†} | Phuket, Thailand |
| Dec 11, 2011 | Ironman 70.3 Canberra | (Australia) Canberra, ACT |
| Jan 15, 2012 | Ironman 70.3 Pucón | Pucón, Chile |
| Jan 22, 2012 | Ironman 70.3 South Africa | Buffalo City, South Africa |
| Feb 12, 2012 | Ironman 70.3 Latin American Pro Championship | Panama City, Panama |
| Feb 19, 2012 | Ironman 70.3 Sri Lanka | Colombo, Sri Lanka |
| Mar 18, 2012 | Ironman 70.3 Singapore | Singapore |
| Mar 18, 2012 | Ironman 70.3 San Juan | San Juan, Puerto Rico |
| Mar 31, 2012 | Ironman 70.3 California | (United States) Oceanside, California |
| Apr 1, 2012 | Ironman 70.3 US Pro Championship | (United States) Galveston Island, Texas |
| Apr 22, 2012 | Ironman 70.3 New Orleans | (United States) New Orleans, Louisiana |
| May 5, 2012 | Ironman 70.3 Busselton | Busselton, Western Australia |
| May 6, 2012 | Ironman 70.3 St Croix^{†} | (United States Virgin Islands) Saint Croix, U.S. Virgin Islands |
| May 12, 2012 | Ironman 70.3 Mallorca | Alcudia, Mallorca, Spain |
| May 20, 2012 | Ironman 70.3 Florida | (United States) Haines City, Florida |
| May 20, 2012 | Ironman 70.3 Austria | St. Pölten/Vienna, Austria |
| Jun 2, 2012 | Ironman 70.3 Hawaii^{†} | (United States) Kohala, Hawaii |
| Jun 3, 2012 | Ironman 70.3 Switzerland | Rapperswil-Jona, Lake Zurich, Switzerland |
| Jun 3, 2012 | Ironman 70.3 Mooseman | (United States) Newfound Lake, New Hampshire |
| Jun 9, 2012 | Ironman 70.3 Boise | (United States) Boise, Idaho |
| Jun 10, 2012 | Ironman 70.3 Italy | Pescara, Italy |
| Jun 10, 2012 | Ironman 70.3 Kansas | (United States) Lawrence, Kansas |
| Jun 10, 2012 | Ironman 70.3 Eagleman^{†} | (United States) Cambridge, Maryland |
| Jun 17, 2012 | Ironman 70.3 U.K. | (United Kingdom) Wimbleball, Exmoor, UK |
| Jun 24, 2012 | Ironman 70.3 Japan^{†} | Tokoname, Aichi, Japan |
| Jun 24, 2012 | Ironman 70.3 Syracuse | (United States) Syracuse, New York |
| Jun 24, 2012 | Ironman 70.3 Mont Tremblant | (Canada) Mont-Tremblant, Quebec |
| Jun 24, 2012 | Ironman 70.3 Buffalo Springs Lake^{†∗} | (United States) Lubbock, Texas |
| Jul 7, 2012 | Ironman 70.3 Muncie | (United States) Muncie, Indiana |
| Jul 8, 2012 | Ironman 70.3 Haugesund | Haugesund, Norway |
| Jul 8, 2012 | Ironman 70.3 Rhode Island | (United States) Providence, Rhode Island |
| Jul 15, 2012 | Ironman 70.3 Racine | (United States) Racine, Wisconsin |
| Jul 15, 2012 | Ironman 70.3 Vineman | (United States) Sonoma County, California |
| Jul 15, 2012 | Ironman 70.3 Lake Stevens | (United States) Lake Stevens, Washington |
| Jul 22, 2012 | Ironman 70.3 Antwerp^{‡} | Antwerp, Belgium |
| Jul 29, 2012 | Ironman 70.3 Calgary | Calgary, Canada |
| Aug 5, 2012 | Ironman 70.3 Philippines | Cebu, Philippines |
| Aug 5, 2012 | Ironman 70.3 Boulder | (United States) Boulder, Colorado |
| Aug 12, 2012 | Ironman 70.3 European Championship-Wiesbaden | Wiesbaden, Germany |

^{†}Also served as a 2012 Ironman World Championship qualifier.
^{‡}Also served as a 2012 Ironman World Championship qualifier, 3 handcycle entries only.
^{∗}Ironman 70.3 U.S. Handcycle Championship

=== 2012 Ironman 70.3 Series results ===
==== Men ====
| Event | Gold | Time | Silver | Time | Bronze | Time | Reference |
|---|---|---|---|---|---|---|---|
| Yeppoon | Ollie Whistle (AUS) | 3:56:44 | Matty White (AUS) | 3:56:50 | Richard Thompson (AUS) | 3:58:32 | |
| Timberman | Rasmus Henning (DEN) | 3:53:41 | Mike Caiazzo (USA) | 4:01:30 | Stephan Vuckovic (GER) | 4:06:36 | |
| Brazil | Adriano Sacchetto (BRA) | 3:49:52 | Santiago Ascenço (BRA) | 3:51:59 | Reinaldo Colucci (BRA) | 3:52:18 | |
| Ireland* | Mike Aigrozg (SUI) | 3:50:12 | Pavel Simko (SVK) | 3:55:59 | Owen Cummins (IRE) | 4:01:26 | |
| Muskoka | Michael Lovato (USA) | 4:15:40 | Sean Bechtel (CAN) | 4:17:53 | Justin Park (USA) | 4:20:07 | |
| Las Vegas | Craig Alexander (AUS) | 3:54:48 | Chris Lieto (USA) | 3:58:03 | Jeff Symonds (CAN) | 3:58:42 | |
| Japan | Hideo Fukui (JPN) | 4:10:04 | Fredrik Croneborg (SWE) | 4:11:00 | Daiki Masuda (JPN) | 4:14:37 | |
| Cancún | Andi Böcherer (GER) | 3:55:19 | Daniel Fontana (ITA) | 4:02:05 | Timothy Reed (AUS) | 4:04:23 | |
| Branson | Ben Hoffman (USA) | 4:09:02 | Matt Lieto (USA) | 4:13:51 | Karl Bordine (USA) | 4:23:25 | |
| Syracuse | Bart Aernouts (BEL) | 3:57:30 | Paul Ambrose (AUS) | 4:02:12 | Josh Rix (AUS) | 4:03:40 | |
| Pays d’Aix | Stéphane Poulat (FRA) | 3:49:53 | Sylvain Sudrie (FRA) | 3:50:57 | Julien Loy (FRA) | 3:51:04 | |
| Augusta | Viktor Zyemtsev (UKR) | 3:47:15 | Maxim Kriat (UKR) | 3:49:34 | Tim Berkel (AUS) | 3:51:54 | |
| Pocono** | Bart Aernouts (BEL) | 3:27:04 | Zach Ruble (USA) | 3:34:33 | Fabian Conrad (GER) | 3:35:35 | |
| Austin | Michael Raelert (GER) | 3:47:48 | Ronnie Schildknecht (SUI) | 3:49:48 | Paul Amey (GBR) | 3:52:46 | |
| Miami | Sebastian Kienle (GER) | 3:47:01 | Michael Raelert (GER) | 3:48:01 | Matt Reed (USA) | 3:49:37 | |
| Taiwan | Chris McCormack (AUS) | 3:54:47 | Hideo Fukui (JPN) | 3:58:44 | Frederik Croneborg (SWE) | 3:59:34 | |
| Port Macquarie | Clayton Fettell (AUS) | 3:53:29 | Tim Reed (AUS) | 3:55:29 | Chris Kemp (AUS) | 3:56:29 | |
| Shepparton | Leon Griffin (AUS) | 3:51:27 | Ollie Whistle (AUS) | 4:01:33 | Monty Frankish (AUS) | 4:03:13 | |
| Phuket | Michael Raelert (GER) | 3:51:36 | Richie Cunningham (AUS) | 3:57:16 | Paul Matthews (AUS) | 3:58:24 | |
| Canberra | Tim Reed (AUS) | 4:00:46 | Matt Bailey (AUS) | 4:04:39 | Joshua Maeder (AUS) | 4:06:05 | |
| Pucón | Guilherme Manocchio (BRA) | 4:01:59 | Santiago Ascenço (BRA) | 4:06:32 | Michael Lovato (USA) | 4:07:15 | |
| South Africa | Marino Vanhoenacker (BEL) | 4:06:25 | Ronnie Schildknecht (SUI) | 4:12:56 | Domenico Passuello (ITA) | 4:18:37 | |
| Panama | Bevan Docherty (NZL) | 3:50:13 | Lance Armstrong (USA) | 3:50:55 | Richie Cunningham (AUS) | 3:52:59 | |
| Sri Lanka | Faris Al-Sultan (GER) | 3:51:39 | Bryan Rhodes (NZL) | 3:59:14 | Alessandro Degasperi (ITA) | 4:00:54 | |
| Singapore | Josh Amberger (AUS) | 3:54:45 | Denis Vasiliev (RUS) | 3:59:25 | Dylan McNeice (NZL) | 4:00:51 | |
| San Juan | Timothy O'Donnell (USA) | 3:51:32 | Leon Griffin (AUS) | 3:53:08 | Axel Zeebroek (BEL) | 3:54:56 | |
| California | Andy Potts (USA) | 3:54:03 | Richie Cunningham (AUS) | 3:55:11 | Jesse Thomas (USA) | 3:55:22 | |
| Texas | Timothy O'Donnell (USA) | 3:47:40 | Sebastian Kienle (GER) | 3:48:03 | Ronnie Schildknecht (SUI) | 3:48:09 | |
| New Orleans*** | Trevor Wurtele (CAN) | 3:23:51 | Richie Cunningham (AUS) | 3:24:04 | Tom Lowe (GBR) | 3:24:05 | |
| Busselton | James Hodge (AUS) | 3:55:08 | Matty White (AUS) | 3:56:33 | Callum Millward (AUS) | 3:58:07 | |
| St. Croix | Andy Potts (USA) | 4:03:31 | Stephane Poulat (FRA) | 4:05:25 | Lance Armstrong (USA) | 4:07:08 | |
| Mallorca | Michael Raelert (GER) | 3:57:08 | Michael Göhner (GER) | 4:10:11 | Ben Allen (AUS) | 4:12:51 | |
| Florida | Lance Armstrong (USA) | 3:45:38 | Maxim Kriat (UKR) | 3:56:56 | Francesc Godoy (ESP) | 3:59:45 | |
| Austria | Filip Ospalý (CZE) | 3:54:45 | Andreas Raelert (GER) | 3:55:24 | Cyril Viennot (FRA) | 3:56:18 | |
| Hawaii | Lance Armstrong (USA) | 3:50:55 | Greg Bennett (AUS) | 3:53:41 | Chris Lieto (USA) | 4:05:55 | |
| Switzerland | Michael Raelert (GER) | 3:44:13 | Bart Aernouts (BEL) | 3:51:04 | Bruno Clerbout (BEL) | 3:51:37 | |
| Mooseman | Clayton Fettell (AUS) | 4:00:10 | Maxim Kriat (UKR) | 4:13:27 | Karl Bordine (USA) | 4:17:00 | |
| Boise^{†} | Matt Reed (USA) | 2:13:23 | Callum Millward (NZL) | 2:13:23 | Timothy O'Donnell (USA) | 2:14:17 | |
| Italy | Daniel Fontana (ITA) | 4:13:25 | Alessandro Degasperi (ITA) | 4:15:31 | Paul Amey (GBR) | 4:18:28 | |
| Kansas | Clayton Fettell (AUS) | 3:56:59 | Paul Ambrose (AUS) | 3:59:33 | Ben Hoffman (USA) | 4:00:43 | |
| Eagleman | Craig Alexander (AUS) | 3:44:57 | Greg Bennett (AUS) | 3:47:14 | T. J. Tollakson (USA) | 3:48:52 | |
| U.K. | Philip Graves (GBR) | 4:19:45 | Markus Thomschke (GER) | 4:21:04 | Spencer Harris (GBR) | 4:22:14 | |
| Japan | Chris McCormack (AUS) | 4:03:40 | Tim Berkel (AUS) | 4:03:42 | Fredrik Croneborg (SWE) | 4:12:19 | |
| Syracuse | Joe Gambles (AUS) | 3:53:51 | Paul Ambrose (AUS) | 3:54:48 | Callum Millward (NZL) | 3:57:42 | |
| Mont-Tremblant | Romain Guillaume (FRA) | 3:58:08 | Ryan Grant (CAN) | 4:10:50 | Grant Burwash (CAN) | 4:12:33 | |
| Buffalo Springs | Drew Scott (USA) | 4:01:13 | Michael Lovato (USA) | 4:01:15 | Joe Umphenour (USA) | 4:01:42 | |
| Muncie^{††} | Greg Bennett (AUS) | 2:00:24 | Joshua Amberger (AUS) | 2:01:37 | Ben Hoffman (USA) | 2:03:24 | |
| Haugesund | Filip Ospalý (CZE) | 3:47:22 | Rasmus Henning (DEN) | 3:54:31 | Gudmund Snilstveit (NOR) | 3:57:33 | |
| Rhode Island | Paul Ambrose (AUS) | 3:54:29 | Maxim Kriat (UKR) | 4:05:03 | Mike Caiazzo (USA) | 4:07:14 | |
| Racine | Marko Albert (EST) | 3:59:23 | Paul Ambrose (AUS) | 4:02:04 | Tim Reed (USA) | 4:04:27 | |
| Vineman | Greg Bennett (AUS) | 3:45:49 | Joe Gambles (AUS) | 3:46:14 | Paul Matthews (AUS) | 3:47:55 | |
| Lake Stevens | Chris Legh (AUS) | 4:01:29 | Tim O'Donnell (USA) | 4:01:49 | Trevor Wurtele (CAN) | 4:02:29 | |
| Antwerp | Bart Aernouts (BEL) | 3:44:51 | Bert Jammaer (BEL) | 3:48:39 | Stanislav Krylov (RUS) | 3:51:44 | |
| Calgary | Rasmus Henning (DEN) | 3:51:02 | Chris Legh (AUS) | 3:51:42 | Jeff Symonds (CAN) | 3:52:36 | |
| Philippines | Pete Jacobs (AUS) | 4:07:38 | Cameron Brown (NZL) | 4:09:01 | Assad Attamimi (AUS) | 4:17:47 | |
| Boulder | Joe Gambles (AUS) | 3:44:04 | Jordan Jones (USA) | 3:47:41 | Ben Hoffman (USA) | 3:48:22 | |
| Wiesbaden | Michael Raelert (GER) | 4:03:58 | Bart Aernouts (BEL) | 4:06:28 | Boris Stein (GER) | 4:07:51 | |

*Swim course shortened due to weather and safety concerns.
**Swim leg canceled due to high water.
***Swim leg canceled due to high wind. Course was a 2 mi run, 52 mi bike, and 13.1 mi run.
^{†}Bike shortened to 15 miles due to cold weather conditions.
^{††}Shortened to Olympic distance due to hot weather conditions.

==== Women ====
| Event | Gold | Time | Silver | Time | Bronze | Time | Reference |
|---|---|---|---|---|---|---|---|
| Yeppoon | Michelle Wu (AUS) | 4:22:43 | Lisa Marangon (AUS) | 4:28:11 | Kristy Hallett (AUS) | 4:32:38 | |
| Timberman | Chrissie Wellington (GBR) | 4:16:33 | Caitlin Snow (USA) | 4:26:36 | Annie Gervais (CAN) | 4:34:24 | |
| Brazil | Susana Festner (BRA) | 4:18:36 | Claire Horner (RSA) | 4:19:00 | María Soledad Omar (ARG) | 4:20:08 | |
| Ireland* | Lucy Gossage (GBR) | 4:21:09 | Rachel Joyce (GBR) | 4:23:37 | Charisa Wernick (USA) | 4:37:41 | |
| Muskoka | Amanda Lovato (USA) | 4:46:43 | Jennifer Tetrick (USA) | 4:51:38 | Missy Kuck (USA) | 4:56:32 | |
| Las Vegas | Melissa Rollison (AUS) | 4:20:55 | Karin Thürig (CHE) | 4:26:52 | Linsey Corbin (USA) | 4:29:25 | |
| Japan | Belinda Granger (AUS) | 4:45:59 | Emi Shiono (JPN) | 4:48:12 | Saori Ohmatsu (JPN) | 4:50:22 | |
| Cancún | Christie Sym (AUS) | 4:40:31 | Heather Gollnick (USA) | 4:45:41 | Melody Ramírez (MEX) | 4:51:22 | |
| Branson | Jessica Meyers (USA) | 4:45:14 | Nina Kraft (GER) | 4:51:59 | Mackenzie Madison (USA) | 4:53:27 | |
| Syracuse | Nikki Butterfield (AUS) | 4:18:57 | Caroline Steffen (SUI) | 4:21:54 | Samantha Warriner (NZL) | 4:33:31 | |
| Pays d’Aix | Jeanne Collonge (FRA) | 4:17:42 | Johanna Daumas (FRA) | 4:24:20 | Erika Csomor (HUN) | 4:26:35 | |
| Augusta | Emma-Kate Lidbury (GBR) | 4:19:31 | Amanda Lovato (USA) | 4:25:54 | Heather Jackson (USA) | 4:28:30 | |
| Pocono** | Magali Tisseyre (CAN) | 3:57:11 | Jessie Donovan (USA) | 4:02:46 | Jennifer Tetrick (USA) | 4:04:11 | |
| Austin | Jessica Meyers (USA) | 4:29:15 | Mandy McLane (USA) | 4:34:39 | Caroline Gregory (USA) | 4:38:28 | |
| Miami | Leanda Cave (GBR) | 4:13:35 | Magali Tisseyre (CAN) | 4:21:12 | Emma-Kate Lidbury (GBR) | 4:23:11 | |
| Taiwan | Michelle Wu (AUS) | 4:31:55 | Maki Nishiuchi (JPN) | 4:56:17 | Venessa Colless (GBR) | 4:57:41 | |
| Port Macquarie | Carrie Lester (AUS) | 4:28:25 | Samantha Warriner (NZL) | 4:29:50 | Joanna Lawn (NZL) | 4:32:27 | |
| Shepparton | Samantha Warriner (NZL) | 4:25:25 | Lisa Marangon (AUS) | 4:27:56 | Nicole Ward (AUS) | 4:35:22 | |
| Phuket | Melissa Rollison (AUS) | 4:17:01 | Natascha Badmann (SUI) | 4:30:42 | Radka Vodičková (CZE) | 4:34:50 | |
| Canberra | Lisa Marangon (AUS) | 4:24:41 | Michelle Wu (AUS) | 4:30:24 | Nicole Ward (AUS) | 4:39:55 | |
| Pucón | Carla Stampfli (SUI) | 4:38:03 | Valentina Carvallo (CHI) | 4:40:23 | Heather Gollnick (USA) | 4:46:46 | |
| South Africa | Jodie Swallow (GBR) | 4:39:01 | Lucie Zelenková (CZE) | 4:43:56 | Tine Deckers (BEL) | 4:46:13 | |
| Panama | Angela Naeth (CAN) | 4:15:31 | Kelly Williamson (USA) | 4:19:11 | Margaret Shapiro (USA) | 4:19:34 | |
| Sri Lanka | Lucie Zelenková (CZE) | 4:30:17 | Katja Rabe (GER) | 4:34:13 | Christie Sym (AUS) | 4:36:38 | |
| Singapore | Mary Beth Ellis (USA) | 4:19:35 | Michelle Wu (AUS) | 4:25:31 | Kate Bevilaqua (AUS) | 4:32:19 | |
| San Juan | Kelly Williamson (USA) | 4:14:06 | Linsey Corbin (USA) | 4:18:38 | Radka Vodičková (CZE) | 4:23:23 | |
| California | Melanie McQuaid (CAN) | 4:19:13 | Heather Jackson (USA) | 4:21:57 | Meredith Kessler (USA) | 4:23:40 | |
| Texas | Kelly Williamson (USA) | 4:13:27 | Yvonne van Vlerken (NED) | 4:18:47 | Amy Marsh (USA) | 4:20:16 | |
| New Orleans*** | Sarah Piampiano (USA) | 3:43:58 | Heather Wurtele (CAN) | 3:45:53 | Mirinda Carfrae (AUS) | 3:47:28 | |
| Busselton | Felicity Sheedy-Ryan (AUS) | 4:21:27 | Kate Bevilaqua (AUS) | 4:22:29 | Lisa Marangon (AUS) | 4:24:46 | |
| St. Croix | Angela Naeth (CAN) | 4:28:12 | Mary Beth Ellis (USA) | 4:33:34 | Sara Gross (CAN) | 4:46:33 | |
| Mallorca | Emma-Kate Lidbury (GBR) | 4:39:05 | Tine Deckers (BEL) | 4:43:18 | Natascha Schmitt (GER) | 4:47:11 | |
| Florida | Jessica Jacobs (USA) | 4:24:34 | Jennifer Tetrick (USA) | 4:26:09 | Amanda Stevens (USA) | 4:28:19 | |
| Austria | Julia Gajer (GER) | 4:23:14 | Erika Csomor (HUN) | 4:24:08 | Natascha Badmann (SUI) | 4:24:24 | |
| Hawaii | Linsey Corbin (USA) | 4:26:09 | Julia Grant (NZL) | 4:30:17 | Beth Walsh (USA) | 4:31:47 | |
| Switzerland | Nicola Spirig (SUI) | 4:08:52 | Caroline Steffen (SUI) | 4:12:17 | Gina Crawford (NZL) | 4:19:53 | |
| Mooseman | Magali Tisseyre (CAN) | 4:32:40 | Mary Beth Ellis (USA) | 4:35:11 | Lesley Paterson (GBR) | 4:39:10 | |
| Boise^{†} | Jodie Swallow (GBR) | 2:29:28 | Malaika Homo (USA) | 2:31:51 | Nikki Butterfield (AUS) | 2:33:33 | |
| Italy | Kristin Möller (GER) | 4:47:58 | Edith Niederfriniger (ITA) | 4:50:06 | Jacqui Slack (GBR) | 4:51:04 | |
| Kansas | Rachel Joyce (GBR) | 4:13:46 | Amanda Stevens (USA) | 4:36:26 | Kirsten Sass (USA) | 4:37:32 | |
| Eagleman | Meredith Kessler (USA) | 4:12:40 | Margaret Shapiro (USA) | 4:22:38 | Kristin Andrews (USA) | 4:26:56 | |
| U.K. | Eimear Mullan (IRL) | 4:53:33 | Emma-Kate Lidbury (GBR) | 4:56:23 | Simone Brändli (SUI) | 4:57:16 | |
| Japan | Keiko Tanaka (JPN) | 4:37:33 | Saori Ohmatsu (JPN) | 4:40:24 | Katja Rabe (THA) | 4:47:43 | |
| Syracuse | Angela Naeth (CAN) | 4:16:27 | Jodie Swallow (GBR) | 4:19:0+ | Nikki Butterfield (GBR) | 4:24:52 | |
| Mont-Tremblant | Magali Tisseyre (CAN) | 4:23:30 | Annie Gervais (CAN) | 4:38:41 | Gillian Clayton (CAN) | 4:39:52 | |
| Buffalo Springs | Amanda Stevens (USA) | 4:26:09 | Jessica Jacobs (USA) | 4:28:47 | Allison Linnell (USA) | 4:36:04 | |
| Muncie^{††} | Kelly Williamson (USA) | 2:10:53 | Jodie Swallow (GBR) | 2:14:55 | Mirinda Carfrae (AUS) | 2:15:33 | |
| Haugesund | Mary Beth Ellis (USA) | 4:16:09 | Michelle Vesterby (DEN) | 4:24:24 | Jeanne Collonge (FRA) | 4:25:18 | |
| Rhode Island | Caitlin Snow (USA) | 4:32:50 | Annie Gervais (CAN) | 4:40:43 | Miranda Tomenson (CAN) | 4:40:58 | |
| Racine | Jessica Jacobs (USA) | 4:26:04 | Dede Griesbauer (USA) | 4:32:06 | Christie Sym (AUS) | 4:33:10 | |
| Vineman | Meredith Kessler (USA) | 4:10:15 | Melissa Hauschildt (AUS) | 4:11:05 | Amy Marsh (USA) | 4:13:21 | |
| Lake Stevens | Mirinda Carfrae (AUS) | 4:26:38 | Sheila Croft (USA) | 4:33:13 | Tenille Hoogland (CAN) | 4:38:28 | |
| Antwerp | Nicola Spirig (SUI) | 4:10:47 | Susie Hignett (GBR) | 4:23:37 | Heleen Bij de Vaate (FRA) | 4:25:49 | |
| Calgary | Magali Tisseyre (CAN) | 4:17:24 | Heather Jackson (USA) | 4:18:12 | Melanie McQuaid (CAN) | 4:23:09 | |
| Philippines | Caroline Steffen (SUI) | 4:20:48 | Bree Wee (USA) | 4:27:24 | Belinda Granger (AUS) | 4:32:09 | |
| Boulder | Liz Blatchford (GBR) | 4:07:48 | Melissa Hauschildt (AUS) | 4:09:44 | Leanda Cave (GBR) | 4:10:55 | |
| Wiesbaden | Anja Beranek (GER) | 4:36:09 | Virginia Berasategui (ESP) | 4:40:30 | Julia Gajer (GER) | 4:40:39 | |

*Swim course shortened due to weather and safety concerns.
**Swim leg canceled due to high water.
***Swim leg canceled due to high wind. Course was a 2 mi run, 52 mi bike, and 13.1 mi run.
^{†}Bike shortened to 15 miles due to cold weather conditions.
^{††}Shortened to Olympic distance due to hot weather conditions.

== Lance Armstrong ==
In 2012, Lance Armstrong was pursuing qualification into the 2012 Ironman World Championship. He made his return to long distance triathlon in the inaugural Ironman 70.3 Panama race, on February 12, 2012. He finished with a time of 3:50:55, second overall to Bevan Docherty. He also entered half-Ironman distance races in Texas (7th) and St. Croix (3rd) before breaking through with victories at Ironman 70.3 Florida and Ironman 70.3 Hawaii. He was scheduled to next participate in Ironman France on June 24. However, on June 13, 2012, the United States Anti-Doping Agency (USADA) accused Armstrong of doping and trafficking of drugs, based on blood samples from 2009 and 2010. Armstrong was initially suspended and eventually banned from participating in sports sanctioned by WADA. He chose not to appeal the ban. Because of the suspension and subsequent ban, Armstrong was prohibited from racing Ironman branded events to due World Triathlon Corporation anti-doping policies.
