= 2012 Ironman World Championship =

Triathlon competition

The 2012 Ironman World Championship was a long distance triathlon competition held on October 13, 2012 in Kailua-Kona, Hawaii. The championship won by Pete Jacobs of Australia and Leanda Cave of England. It was the 36th such Ironman Triathlon World Championship, which has been held annually in Hawaii since 1978, with an additional race in 1982. The championship is organized by the World Triathlon Corporation (WTC).

== Championship results ==
=== Men ===
Pos.	Time (h:mm:ss)	Name	Country	Split times (h:mm:ss / m:ss)				
Pos.	Time (h:mm:ss)	Name	Country	Swim	T1	Bike	T2	Run
Gold medal	8:18:37	Pete Jacobs	Australia	0:51:28	1:49	4:35:15	2:02	2:48:06
Silver medal	8:23:40	Andreas Raelert	Germany	0:55:17	1:53	4:36:34	2:33	2:47:24
Bronze medal	8:24:09	Frederik Van Lierde	Belgium	0:51:36	2:01	4:35:25	2:19	2:52:50
4	8:27:08	Sebastian Kienle	Germany	0:55:21	1:56	4:33:23	2:05	2:54:25
5	8:28:33	Faris Al-Sultan	Germany	0:51:39	1:45	4:35:53	2:27	2:56:50
6	8:30:57	Timo Bracht	Germany	0:53:45	2:05	4:37:17	2:15	2:55:37
7	8:31:45	Andy Potts	United States	0:50:32	1:41	4:43:52	2:22	2:53:18
8	8:33:28	Timothy O'Donnell	United States	0:51:37	1:34	4:44:16	2:04	2:53:59
9	8:35:02	David Dellow	Australia	0:51:33	1:44	4:40:28	2:16	2:59:03
10	8:36:21	Dirk Bockel	Luxembourg	0:52:30	1:48	4:34:17	2:01	3:05:48

=== Women ===
Pos.	Time (h:mm:ss)	Name	Country	Split times (h:mm:ss / m:ss)				
Pos.	Time (h:mm:ss)	Name	Country	Swim	T1	Bike	T2	Run
Gold medal	9:15:54	Leanda Cave	United Kingdom	0:56:03	2:09	5:12:06	2:25	3:03:13
Silver medal	9:16:58	Caroline Steffen	Switzerland	0:57:37	1:48	5:06:49	2:37	3:08:09
Bronze medal	9:21:41	Mirinda Carfrae	Australia	1:00:06	1:56	5:12:18	2:19	3:05:04
4	9:22:45	Sonja Tajsich	Germany	1:10:36	2:03	5:07:55	2:43	2:59:27
5	9:22:57	Mary Beth Ellis	United States	0:56:06	1:59	5:08:06	6:18	3:10:30
6	9:26:25	Natascha Badmann	Switzerland	1:06:21	2:24	5:06:07	2:15	3:09:19
7	9:28:54	Gina Crawford	New Zealand	0:55:59	2:45	5:21:31	2:25	3:06:16
8	9:32:18	Linsey Corbin	United States	1:02:53	2:06	5:16:55	2:31	3:07:55
9	9:36:18	Caitlin Snow	United States	0:57:43	2:14	5:30:48	2:28	3:03:07
10	9:38:15	Amy Marsh	United States	0:56:08	1:53	5:16:37	3:12	3:20:27

== Qualification ==
For entry into the 2012 World Championship race, amateur athletes were required to qualify through a performance at an Ironman or selected Ironman 70.3 race. Entry into the championship race could also be obtained through a random allocation lottery or through the Ironman’s charitable eBay auction. The division of athletes was divided into professional, age group, physically challenged, and hand cycle divisions.

For professional triathletes, the 2012 championship season marked the second year of a point system that determined which professional triathletes would qualify for the championship race. To qualify, points were earned by competing in WTC sanctioned Ironman and Ironman 70.3 events throughout the qualifying year. For the 2012 championship race that period was September 1, 2011 to August 31, 2012. The top 50 male and top 30 female pros in points at the end of the qualifying year qualified to race in Kona. An athlete's five highest scoring races were counted in the point totals. At least one Ironman race must have been completed and only three Ironman 70.3 races could count towards an athlete's overall point total. Prior champions receive an automatic entry for the Championship race for a period of five years after their last championship performance provided that they competed in at least one full-distance Ironman race during the qualifying year. Their entry does not count toward the number of available qualifying spots.

The Ironman 2012 series consisted of 28 Ironman races plus the 2011 Ironman World Championship which was itself a qualifier for the 2012 Championship.

=== Qualifying Ironmans ===
Date	Event	Location
Sep 11, 2011	Ironman Wales	Tenby, Pembrokeshire, Wales
Sep 11, 2011	Ironman Wisconsin	(United States) Madison, Wisconsin
Oct 8, 2011	Ironman World Championship	(United States) Kailua-Kona, Hawaii
Nov 5, 2011	Ironman Florida	(United States) Panama City Beach, Florida
Nov 20, 2011	Ironman Arizona	(United States) Tempe, Arizona
Nov 27, 2011	Ironman Cozumel	Cozumel, Quintana Roo, Mexico
Dec 4, 2011	Ironman Western Australia	Busselton, Western Australia
Mar 3, 2012	Ironman New Zealand	Taupō, New Zealand
Mar 25, 2012	Ironman Asia Pacific Championship	Melbourne, Australia
Apr 22, 2012	Ironman South Africa	Port Elizabeth, South Africa
May 5, 2012	Ironman St.George	(United States) St. George, Utah
May 6, 2012	Ironman Australia	Port Macquarie, New South Wales, Australia
May 19, 2012	Ironman Lanzarote	Puerto del Carmen, Lanzarote, Spain
May 19, 2012	Ironman Texas	(United States) The Woodlands Township, Texas
May 27, 2012	Ironman Brazil	Florianópolis Island, Brazil
Jun 3, 2012	Ironman Cairns	Cairns, Australia
Jun 17, 2012	Ironman Regensburg	Regensburg, Bavaria, Germany
Jun 24, 2012	Ironman France	Nice, France
Jun 24, 2012	Ironman Coeur d'Alene	(United States) Coeur d'Alene, Idaho
Jul 1, 2012	Ironman Austria	Klagenfurt, Austria
Jul 8, 2012	Ironman European Championship	Frankfurt, Germany
Jul 15, 2012	Ironman Switzerland	Zürich, Switzerland
July 22, 2012	Ironman UK	Bolton, Greater Manchester, United Kingdom
Jul 22, 2012	Ironman Lake Placid	(United States) Lake Placid, New York
Aug 11, 2012	Ironman US Championship	(United States) New York City, New York
Aug 18, 2012	Ironman Sweden	Kalmar, Sweden
Aug 19, 2012	Ironman Mont-Tremblant	Mont-Tremblant, Quebec, Canada
Aug 26, 2012	Ironman Louisville	(United States) Louisville, Kentucky
Aug 26, 2012	Ironman Canada	Penticton, British Columbia, Canada

=== 2012 Ironman Series results ===
==== Men ====
Event	Gold	Time	Silver	Time	Bronze	Time	Reference
Wales	Jérémy Jurkiewicz (FRA)	9:04:20	Aaron Farlow (AUS)	9:04:25	Bruno Clerbout (BEL)	9:07:59	
Wisconsin	Ezequiel Morales (ARG)	8:45:18	Stefan Schmid (GER)	8:57:51	Mac Brown (USA)	9:08:14	
World Champs 2011	Craig Alexander (AUS)	8:03:56	Pete Jacobs (AUS)	8:09:11	Andreas Raelert (GER)	8:11:07	
Florida	Ronnie Schildknecht (SUI)	7:59:42	Maxim Kriat (UKR)	8:10:43	Justin Daerr (USA)	8:18:02	
Arizona	Eneko Llanos (ESP)	7:59:38	Paul Amey (GBR)	8:01:29	Viktor Zyemtsev (UKR)	8:14:36	
Cozumel	Michael Lovato (USA)	8:23:52	Patrick Evoe (USA)	8:30:36	Alejandro Santamaria (ESP)	8:32:50	
Western Australia	Timo Bracht (GER)	8:12:39	Clayton Fettell (AUS)	8:19:02	Jason Shortis (AUS)	8:27:31	
New Zealand*	Marino Vanhoenacker (BEL)	3:55:03	Timothy Reed (AUS)	3:55:51	Cameron Brown (NZL)	3:56:38	
Asia Pacific	Craig Alexander (AUS)	7:57:44	Cameron Brown (NZL)	8:00:12	Frederik Van Lierde (BEL)	8:01:26	
South Africa	Clemente Alonso-McKernan (ESP)	8:34:45	Cyril Viennot (FRA)	8:41:48	Mike Aigroz (SUI)	8:46:04	
St. George	Ben Hoffman (USA)	9:07:04	Maik Twelsiek (GER)	9:25:58	Axel Zeebroek (BEL)	9:35:33	
Australia	Paul Ambrose (AUS)	8:17:38	Tim Berkel (AUS)	8:21:11	Jason Shortis (AUS)	8:40:02	
Lanzarote	Victor Del Corral (ESP)	8:44:39	Stephen Bayliss (GBR)	8:53:37	Sérgio Marques (POR)	9:02:58	
Texas	Jordan Rapp (USA)	8:10:44	Justin Daerr (USA)	8:22:15	Mathias Hecht (SUI)	8:22:58	
Brazil	Ezequiel Morales (ARG)	8:22:40	Santiago Ascenço (BRA)	8:25:31	Igor Amorelli (BRA)	8:27:56	
Cairns	David Dellow (AUS)	8:15:04	Cameron Brown (NZL)	8:22:21	Jimmy Johnsen (DEN)	8:29:36	
Regensburg	Dirk Bockel (LUX)	8:11:59	Michael Raelert (GER)	8:18:53	Mike Schifferle (SUI)	8:36:53	
France	Frederik Van Lierde (BEL)	8:21:51	Paul Amey (GBR)	8:42:48	Francois Chabaud (FRA)	8:45:23	
Coeur d'Alene	Viktor Zyemtsev (UKR)	8:32:29	Timothy O'Donnell (USA)	8:41:36	Matthew Russell (USA)	8:52:00	
Austria	Faris Al-Sultan (GER)	8:11:41	Daniel Fontana (ITA)	8:20:28	Pedro Gomes (POR)	8:26:30	
European	Marino Vanhoenacker (BEL)	8:03:31	Sebastian Kienle (GER)	8:09:55	Clemente Alonso-McKernan (ESP)	8:14:04	
Switzerland	Ronnie Schildknecht (SUI)	8:17:13	Jan Van Berkel (SUI)	8:32:27	Mathias Hecht (SUI)	8:42:08	
UK	Daniel Halksworth (GBR)	8:55:11	Fraser Cartmell (GBR)	9:07:00	Paul Hawkins (GBR)	9:10:50	
Lake Placid	Andy Potts (USA)	8:25:07	Peter Jacobs (AUS)	8:56:49	Romain Guillaume (FRA)	9:08:57	
United States	Jordan Rapp (USA)	8:11:18	Maxim Kriat (UKR)	8:24:32	Jozsef Major (HUN)	8:27:00	
Sweden	Jan Raphael (GER)	8:04:01	Dorian Wagner (GER)	8:08:06	Horst Reichel (GER)	8:10:12	
Mont-Tremblant	Romain Guillaume (FRA)	8:40:48	Alejandro Santamaria (ARG)	8:46:58	Matthew Russell (USA)	8:48:12	
Louisville	Patrick Evoe (USA)	8:42:44	Chris McDonald (AUS)	8:52:59	Thomas Gerlach (USA)	9:02:42	
Canada	Matthew Russell (USA)	8:48:30	Olly Piggin (CAN)	8:54:17	Christian Brader (GER)	8:58:59	

* Event shortened to 70.3 distance.

==== Women ====
Event	Gold	Time	Silver	Time	Bronze	Time	Reference
Wales	Kristin Moeller (GER)	10:01:19	Anja Ippach (GER)	10:15:58	Stefanie Adam (BEL)	10:40:58	
Wisconsin	Jessica Jacobs (USA)	9:41:03	Meredith Kessler (USA)	9:50:45	Whitney Garcia (USA)	10:03:53	
World Champs 2011	Chrissie Wellington (GBR)	8:55:08	Mirinda Carfrae (AUS)	8:57:57	Leanda Cave (GBR)	9:03:29	
Florida	Jessica Jacobs (USA)	8:55:10	Mackenzie Madison (USA)	9:10:21	Sofie Goos (BEL)	9:22:21	
Arizona	Leanda Cave (GBR)	8:49:00	Linsey Corbin (USA)	8:54:33	Meredith Kessler (USA)	9:00:14	
Cozumel	Simone Benz (SUI)	9:14:08	Sonja Tajsich (GER)	9:23:15	Sophie De Groote (BEL)	9:26:07	
Western Australia	Michelle Bremer (NZL)	9:25:38	Michelle Mitchell (AUS)	9:28:07	Carrie Lester (AUS)	9:32:44	
New Zealand*	Meredith Kessler (USA)	4:22:46	Kate Bevilaqua (AUS)	4:30:37	Joanna Lawn (NZL)	4:30:40	
Asia Pacific	Caroline Steffen (SUI)	8:34:51	Rachel Joyce (GBR)	8:46:09	Mirinda Carfrae (AUS)	9:04:00	
South Africa	Natascha Badmann (SUI)	9:47:10	Simone Brändli (SUI)	9:52:26	Diane Riesler (GER)	10:01:14	
St. George	Meredith Kessler (USA)	10:12:59	Jessie Donovan (USA)	10:37:30	Danielle Kehoe (USA)	10:45:33	
Australia	Michelle Mitchell (AUS)	9:34:57	Nicole Ward (AUS)	9:44:40	Hillary Biscay (USA)	9:58:19	
Lanzarote	Michelle Vesterby (DEN)	9:58:06	Bella Bayliss (GBR)	10:06:12	Heleen bij de Vaate (NED)	10:17:33	
Texas	Mary Beth Ellis (USA)	8:54:58	Kim Loeffler (USA)	9:01:32	Amy Marsh (USA)	9:04:00	
Brazil	Sofie Goos (BEL)	9:17:42	Caitlin Snow (USA)	9:20:50	Vanessa Gianinni (BRA)	9:23:49	
Cairns	Carrie Lester (AUS)	9:21:00	Belinda Harper (NZL)	9:22:42	Candice Hammond (NZL)	9:24:45	
Regensburg	Heidi Sessner (GER)	9:43:52	Nicole Bretting (GER)	9:50:18	Maria Lemeseva (RUS)	9:52:32	
France	Tine Deckers (BEL)	9:16:05	Gina Crawford (NZL)	9:26:25	Kristin Möller (GER)	9:37:07	
Coeur d'Alene	Meredith Kessler (USA)	9:21:44	Haley Cooper-Scott (USA)	10:01:25	Whitney Garcia (USA)	10:01:46	
Austria	Linsey Corbin (USA)	9:09:58	Erika Csomor (HUN)	9:12:09	Michaela Rudolph (AUT)	9:44:37	
European	Caroline Steffen (SUI)	8:52:33	Anja Beranek (GER)	9:05:41	Corinne Abraham (GBR)	9:21:03	
Switzerland	Erika Csomor (HUN)	9:20:16	Bella Bayliss (GBR)	9:25:54	Simone Brändli (SUI)	9:30:58	
UK	Eimear Mullan (IRE)	10:08:44	Amanda Stevens (USA)	10:16:57	Annett Kamenz (GER)	10:21:58	
Lake Placid	Jessie Donavan (USA)	9:47:39	Jennie Hansen (USA)	9:56:40	Jacqui Gordon (USA)	10:08:28	
New York	Mary Beth Ellis (USA)	9:02:48	Rebekah Keat (AUS)	9:13:24	Amy Marsh (USA)	9:15:57	
Sweden	Åsa Lundström (SWE)	9:13:27	Dana Wagner (GER)	9:22:32	Emi Sakai (JPN)	9:34:36	
Mont-Tremblant	Jessie Donavan (USA)	9:30:46	Uli Brömme (GER)	9:42:45	Rachel Kiers (CAN)	9:49:49	
Louisville	Bree Wee (USA)	9:36:27	Jackie Arendt (USA)	9:38:14	Terra Castro (USA)	9:53:27	
Canada	Kendra Lee (USA)	9:44:58	Gillian Clayton (CAN)	9:46:07	Karen Thibodeau (CAN)	9:50:52	

* Event shortened to 70.3 distance.
