= 2011 Ironman World Championship =

Held in Kailua-Kona, Hawaii

The 2011 Ironman World Championship was held on October 8, 2011, in Kailua-Kona, Hawaii and won by Craig Alexander of Australia and Chrissie Wellington of England. It was the 35th such Ironman Triathlon World Championships, which has been held annually in Hawaii since 1978, with an additional race in 1982. The championship is organised by the World Triathlon Corporation (WTC).

== Championship results ==
=== Men ===
Pos.	Time (h:mm:ss)	Name	Country	Split times (h:mm:ss / m:ss)				
Pos.	Time (h:mm:ss)	Name	Country	Swim	T1	Bike	T2	Run
Gold medal	8:03:56	Craig Alexander	Australia	0:51:56	1:56	4:24:05	1:58	2:44:03
Silver medal	8:09:11	Pete Jacobs	Australia	0:51:38	1:57	4:31:01	2:07	2:42:29
Bronze medal	8:11:07	Andreas Raelert	Germany	0:51:58	2:04	4:26:52	2:27	2:47:48
4	8:12:58	Dirk Bockel	Luxembourg	0:51:44	2:00	4:24:17	1:54	2:53:03
5	8:20:12	Timo Bracht	Germany	0:53:37	1:42	4:35:07	2:21	2:47:25
6	8:21:07	Mike Aigroz	Switzerland	0:52:31	1:42	4:30:42	2:05	2:54:07
7	8:22:15	Raynard Tissink	South Africa	0:52:08	1:51	4:28:38	3:02	2:56:36
8	8:23:19	Andreas Böcherer	Germany	0:51:49	1:53	4:25:45	2:09	3:01:43
9	8:25:42	Luke McKenzie	Australia	0:51:47	1:45	4:24:15	2:01	3:05:54
10	8:27:18	Faris Al-Sultan	Germany	0:51:55	1:54	4:29:30	2:19	3:01:40

Alexander's overall time broke the previous course record by 12 seconds, which was set by Luc Van Lierde in 1996.

=== Women ===
Pos.	Time (h:mm:ss)	Name	Country	Split times (h:mm:ss / m:ss)				
Pos.	Time (h:mm:ss)	Name	Country	Swim	T1	Bike	T2	Run
Gold medal	8:55:08	Chrissie Wellington	Great Britain	1:01:03	2:05	4:56:53	2:26	2:52:41
Silver medal	8:57:57	Mirinda Carfrae	Australia	0:57:17	1:54	5:04:16	2:21	2:52:09
Bronze medal	9:03:29	Leanda Cave	Great Britain	0:53:54	2:03	4:58:41	2:15	3:06:36
4	9:06:57	Rachel Joyce	Great Britain	0:53:56	2:00	4:58:56	2:11	3:09:54
5	9:07:32	Caroline Steffen	Switzerland	0:57:15	1:54	4:50:26	2:40	3:15:17
6	9:15:00	Karin Thürig	Switzerland	1:12:19	2:13	4:44:19	2:38	3:13:31
7	9:15:17	Sonja Tajsich	Germany	1:06:57	1:57	4:58:55	2:42	3:04:46
8	9:17:56	Heather Wurtele	Canada	0:58:43	2:13	4:59:10	2:21	3:15:29
9	9:18:11	Caitlin Snow	United States	0:58:47	2:13	5:20:57	2:24	2:53:50
10	9:19:52	Virginia Berasategui	Spain	0:58:44	2:25	5:03:30	2:23	3:12:50

Both Carfrae and Wellington broke the championship course record for the marathon, set last year by Carfrae.

== Qualification ==
To enter for the 2011 World Championship race, age-group athletes are required to qualify through a performance at an Ironman or selected Ironman 70.3 race. Entry into the race can also be obtained through a random allocation lottery or through the Ironman's charitable eBay auction.

For professional triathletes, the 2011 Championship season marks the first year of a point system that determines which professional triathletes will qualify for the championship race. To qualify, points are earned by competing in WTC sanctioned Ironman and selected Ironman 70.3 events throughout the qualifying year. For the 2011 race that period was September 12, 2010 to August 31, 2011. The top 50 male and top 30 female pros in points at the end of each qualifying year qualify to race in Kona. Prior champions receive an automatic entry for the Championship race for a period of five years after their last championship performance provided that they compete in at least one full-distance Ironman race during the qualifying year.

The Ironman 2011 Series consisted of 22 Ironman races plus the Ironman World Championship 2010 which was itself a qualifier for the 2011 Ironman World Championship. The series started with Ironman Wisconsin 2010 held on September 12, 2010.

=== Qualifying Ironmans ===
Date	Event	Location
Sep 12, 2010	Ironman Wisconsin	(United States) Madison, Wisconsin
Oct 9, 2010	Ironman World Championship	(United States) Kailua-Kona, Hawaii
Nov 6, 2010	Ironman Florida	(United States) Panama City Beach, Florida
Nov 21, 2010	Ironman Arizona	(United States) Tempe, Arizona
Nov 28, 2010	Ironman Cozumel	Cozumel, Quintana Roo, Mexico
Dec 5, 2010	Ironman Western Australia	Busselton, Western Australia
Mar 5, 2011	Ironman New Zealand	Taupō, New Zealand
Apr 10, 2011	Ironman South Africa	Port Elizabeth, South Africa
May 1, 2011	Ironman Australia	Port Macquarie, New South Wales, Australia
May 7, 2011	Ironman St.George	(United States) St. George, Utah
May 21, 2011	Ironman Lanzarote	Puerto del Carmen, Lanzarote, Spain
May 21, 2011	Ironman Texas	(United States) The Woodlands Township, Texas
May 29, 2011	Ironman Brazil	Florianópolis Island, Brazil
Jun 26, 2011	Ironman France	Nice, France
Jun 26, 2011	Ironman Coeur d'Alene	(United States) Coeur d'Alene, Idaho
Jul 4, 2011	Ironman Austria	Klagenfurt, Austria
Jul 10, 2011	Ironman Switzerland	Zürich, Switzerland
Jul 24, 2011	Ironman Germany	Frankfurt, Germany
Jul 25, 2011	Ironman Lake Placid	(United States) Lake Placid, New York
July 31, 2011	Ironman UK	Bolton, Greater Manchester, United Kingdom
Aug 7, 2011	Ironman Regensburg	Regensburg, Bavaria, Germany
Aug 28, 2011	Ironman Louisville	(United States) Louisville, Kentucky
Aug 28, 2011	Ironman Canada	Penticton, British Columbia, Canada

==== China cancellation ====
On May 12, 2011, the WTC announced that the 2011 Ironman China and Ironman 70.3 China races, scheduled for May 29 in Jixian, Tianjin Province, China, were canceled. The Tianjin Sports Bureau (TSB) was unable to obtain the required sanctions from the China Triathlon Sports Association (CTSA) to conduct the event. Murphy Reinschreiber, managing director of the Asia Pacific region for WTC stated that "TSB simply failed to provide all of the documentation necessary for CTSA to process the sanction." WTC is offering a full refund of entry fees to all athletes who were scheduled to compete at Ironman China and Ironman 70.3 China. Additionally, all athletes were offered a complimentary race entry into any of the 2011 Ironman and Ironman 70.3 races. WTC is allocating the age group qualifying slots from Ironman China and Ironman 70.3 China to other races in the region to ensure that athletes from the Asia-Pacific region are represented at the 2011 World Championship events.

=== 2011 Ironman Series results ===
==== Men ====
Event	Gold	Time	Silver	Time	Bronze	Time	Reference
Wisconsin	Joe Gambles (AUS)	8:38:32	Romain Guillaume (FRA)	8:49:42	Eric Bean (USA)	8:51:36	
World Champs 2010	Chris McCormack (AUS)	8:10:37	Andreas Raelert (GER)	8:12:17	Marino Vanhoenacker (BEL)	8:13:14	
Florida	James Cunnama (RSA)	8:15:59	Pedro Gomes (POR)	8:19:26	Dirk Bockel (LUX)	8:21:23	
Arizona	Timo Bracht (GER)	8:07:16	Rasmus Henning (DEN)	8:10:58	Tom Lowe (GBR)	8:11:44	
Cozumel	Andy Potts (USA)	8:16:14	Michael Lovato (USA)	8:22:17	Eduardo Sturla (ARG)	8:24:14	
Western Australia	Courtney Ogden (AUS)	8:14:01	Matty White (AUS)	8:18:06	Pete Jacobs (AUS)	8:21:16	
New Zealand	Cameron Brown (NZL)	8:31:07	Terenzo Bozzone (NZL)	8:41:51	Mathias Hecht (SUI)	8:45:36	
South Africa	Raynard Tissink (RSA)	8:05:36	Andreas Boecherer (GER)	8:08:36	James Cunnama (RSA)	8:13:18	
Australia	Pete Jacobs (AUS)	8:29:28	Patrick Vernay (GER)	8:35:50	Jason Shortis (AUS)	8:46:07	
St. George	Mathias Hecht (SUI)	8:32:03	Maik Twelsiek (GER)	8:33:46	T. J. Tollakson (USA)	8:40:20	
Lanzarote	Timo Bracht (GER)	8:30:34	Konstantin Bachor (GER)	8:44:30	Esben Hovgaard (DEN)	8:54:37	
Texas	Eneko Llanos (ESP)	8:08:20	Timothy O'Donnell (USA)	8:09:50	Luke Bell (AUS)	8:12:22	
Brazil	Eduardo Sturla (ARG)	8:15:03	Guilherme Manocchio (BRA)	8:17:20	Ezequiel Morales (ARG)	8:21:40	
France	Frederik Van Lierde (BEL)	8:28:30	Francois Chabaud (FRA)	8:37:18	Marcel Zamora Perez (ESP)	8:40:55	
Coeur d'Alene	Craig Alexander (AUS)	8:19:48	Maik Twelsiek (GER)	8:24:59	Tom Evans (CAN)	8:49:54	
Austria	Marino Vanhoenacker (BEL)	7:45:59	Michael Weiss (AUT)	7:57:39	Marko Albert (EST)	8:08:17	
Switzerland	Ronnie Schildknecht (SUI)	8:19:51	Clemente Alonso (ESP)	8:27:56	Mathias Hecht (SUI)	8:30:26	
Germany	Faris Al-Sultan (GER)	8:13:50	Jan Raphael (GER)	8:19:31	Michael Göhner (GER)	8:20:26	
Lake Placid	T. J. Tollakson (USA)	8:25:15	Ben Hoffman (USA)	8:33:29	Jason Shortis (AUS)	8:47:18	
UK	Aaron Farlow (AUS)	8:24:33	Romain Guillaume (FRA)	8:41:25	Nick Saunders (GBR)	8:51:31	
Regensburg	Markus Fachbach (GER)	8:29:16	Stefan Riesen (SUI)	8:36:54	Frank Vytrisa (GER)	8:37:11	
Louisville	Chris McDonald (AUS)	8:27:36	Patrick Evoe (USA)	8:30:35	Justin Daerr (USA)	8:34:35	
Canada	Jordan Rapp (USA)	8:28:09	Torsten Abel (GER)	8:41:09	Bert Jammaer (BEL)	8:42:34	

==== Women ====
Event	Gold	Time	Silver	Time	Bronze	Time	Reference
Wisconsin	Gina Crawford (NZL)	9:27:26	Kristin Moeller (GER)	9:39:43	Mirjam Weerd (NED)	9:52:25	
World Champs 2010	Mirinda Carfrae (AUS)	8:58:36	Caroline Steffen (SUI)	9:06:00	Julie Dibens (GBR)	9:10:04	
Florida	Jessica Jacobs (USA)	9:07:49	Erika Csomor (HUN)	9:14:40	Kim Loeffler (USA)	9:21:26	
Arizona	Chrissie Wellington (GBR)	8:36:13	Linsey Corbin (USA)	9:05:33	Leanda Cave (GBR)	9:13:50	
Cozumel	Yvonne van Vlerken (NED)	9:07:25	Tyler Stewart (USA)	9:23:44	Amanda Stevens (USA)	9:26:35	
Western Australia	Kate Bevilaqua (AUS)	9:19:44	Rebekah Keat (AUS)	9:22:37	Amelia Pearson (AUS)	9:36:52	
New Zealand	Samantha Warriner (NZL)	9:28:24	Mirinda Carfrae (AUS)	9:31:33	Joanna Lawn (NZL)	9:31:53	
South Africa	Chrissie Wellington (GBR)	8:33:56	Rachel Joyce (GBR)	9:08:23	Diana Riesler (GER)	9:20:37	
Australia	Caroline Steffen (SUI)	9:29:54	Amelia Pearson (AUS)	9:38:23	Kirsten Molloy (AUS)	9:43:55	
St. George	Heather Wurtele (CAN)	9:30:33	Jackie Arendt (USA)	10:06:36	Uli Bromme (GER)	10:10:48	
Lanzarote	Rachel Joyce (GBR)	9:28:12	Natascha Badmann (SUI)	9:43:40	Karina Ottosen (DEN)	10:10:15	
Texas	Catriona Morrison (GBR)	8:57:51	Kelly Williamson (USA)	9:07:54	Sofie Goos (BEL)	9:12:53	
Brazil	Amy Marsh (USA)	9:09:39	Lucie Zelenková (CZE)	9:16:14	Ariane Monticeli (BRA)	9:19:15	
France	Silvia Felt (GER)	9:34:31	Martina Dogana (ITA)	9:45:56	Kim Loeffler (USA)	9:53:08	
Coeur d'Alene	Julie Dibens (GBR)	9:16:40	Caitlin Snow (USA)	9:29:18	Haley Cooper-Scott (USA)	9:56:21	
Austria	Mary Beth Ellis (USA)	8:43:34	Erika Csomor (HUN)	8:51:10	Diana Riesler (GER)	8:53:34	
Switzerland	Karin Thürig (SUI)	9:03:26	Amy Marsh (USA)	9:11:36	Erika Csomor (HUN)	9:36:59	
Germany	Caroline Steffen (SUI)	9:12:13	Lucie Zelenková (CZE)	9:13:46	Sonja Tajsich (GER)	9:14:14	
Lake Placid	Heather Wurtele (CAN)	9:19:03	Tine Deckers (BEL)	9:34:41	Tyler Stewart (USA)	9:38:09	
UK	Kristin Möller (GER)	9:19:04	Diana Riesler (GER)	9:25:41	Yvette Grice (GBR)	9:37:32	
Regensburg	Mary Beth Ellis (USA)	9:18:55	Annett Kamenz (CAN)	9:28:33	Nicole Leder (GER)	9:30:27	
Louisville	Nina Kraft (GER)	9:38:14	Jackie Arendt (USA)	9:40:28	Stephanie Jones (USA)	9:52:40	
Canada	Mary Beth Ellis (USA)	9:03:13	Kim Loeffler (USA)	9:34:54	Meredith Kessler (USA)	9:37:22	
