= 2015 Ironman World Championship =

2015 triathlon competition

Ironman World Championship
- Location: Kailua-Kona, Hawaii
- Date: October 10, 2015

Champions
- Men: (Germany) Jan Frodeno
- Women: (Switzerland) Daniela Ryf

The 2015 Ironman World Championship was a long distance triathlon competition held on October 10, 2015 in Kailua-Kona, Hawaii and won by Jan Frodeno of Germany and Daniela Ryf of Switzerland. The race was the 39th edition of the Ironman World Championship, which has been held annually in Hawaii since 1978. The championship was organized by the World Triathlon Corporation (WTC) and awarded a total purse prize of $650,000.

== Championship results ==
=== Men ===
Rank	Time (h:mm:ss)	Name	Country	Split times (h:mm:ss / m:ss)				
Rank	Time (h:mm:ss)	Name	Country	Swim	T1	Bike	T2	Run
1st place, gold medalist(s)	8:14:40	Jan Frodeno	Germany	50:50	1:51	4:27:27	2:11	2:52:21
2nd place, silver medalist(s)	8:17:43	Andreas Raelert	Germany	52:24	1:56	4:30:52	2:29	2:50:02
3rd place, bronze medalist(s)	8:18:50	Timothy O'Donnell	United States	52:24	2:01	4:26:13	2:26	2:55:46
4	8:21:25	Andy Potts	United States	50:56	2:11	4:32:41	2:26	2:53:45
5	8:23:09	Tyler Butterfield	Bermuda	52:33	2:01	4:29:35	2:41	2:56:19
6	8:25:05	Cyril Viennot	France	52:35	2:19	4:34:27	2:39	2:53:05
7	8:28:10	Eneko Llanos	Spain	52:36	2:15	4:26:56	2:13	3:04:10
8	8:29:43	Sebastian Kienle	Germany	52:36	2:34	4:25:53	2:32	3:06:08
9	8:30:13	Brent McMahon	Canada	52:26	1:51	4:27:51	2:03	3:06:02
10	8:31:43	Boris Stein	Germany	57:27	2:11	4:30:48	2:29	2:58:48

=== Women ===
Rank	Time (h:mm:ss)	Name	Country	Split times (h:mm:ss / m:ss)				
Rank	Time (h:mm:ss)	Name	Country	Swim	T1	Bike	T2	Run
1st place, gold medalist(s)	8:57:57	Daniela Ryf	Switzerland	56:14	2:10	4:50:46	2:10	3:06:37
2nd place, silver medalist(s)	9:10:59	Rachel Joyce	United Kingdom	56:11	2:15	5:01:29	2:22	3:08:42
3rd place, bronze medalist(s)	9:14:52	Liz Blatchford	United Kingdom	56:13	2:07	5:07:25	2:42	3:06:25
4	9:18:50	Michelle Vesterby	Denmark	56:11	1:58	5:00:41	2:46	3:17:14
5	9:21:45	Heather Jackson	United States	1:04:36	2:13	5:04:43	2:20	3:07:53
6	9:23:50	Susie Cheetham	United Kingdom	57:39	2:08	5:14:33	2:35	3:06:55
7	9:24:32	Sarah Piampiano	United States	1:10:01	2:47	5:02:28	2:43	3:06:33
8	9:25:41	Camilla Pedersen	Denmark	56:14	2:16	4:59:17	2:31	3:25:23
9	9:27:54	Caroline Steffen	Switzerland	56:16	2:05	5:10:53	3:13	3:15:27
10	9:28:36	Lucy Gossage	United Kingdom	1:05:08	2:10	5:02:40	2:47	3:15:51

== Qualification ==
The division of athletes was divided into professional, age group, physically challenged, and hand cycle divisions.

For entry into the 2015 World Championship race professional triathletes qualified for the championship through a point system. Points were earned by competing in WTC sanctioned Ironman and Ironman 70.3 events throughout the qualifying year. For the 2015 championship race that period was August 30, 2014 to August 23, 2015. The top 50 male and top 35 female pros in points at the end of the qualifying year qualify to race in Kona. An athlete's five highest scoring races were counted in the point totals. At least one Ironman race must have been completed and only three Ironman 70.3 races count towards an athlete's overall point total. Prior champions of a WTC Championship received an automatic entry for the Championship race for a period of five years after their last championship performance provided that they competed in at least one full-distance Ironman race during the qualifying year. Additionally, winners of the five regional Ironman championships received automatic qualification into the 2015 Ironman Championship. All automatic entries awarded did not count toward the number of available qualifying spots. The available prize money to professional triathletes for qualifying races ranges from $25,000 to $150,000, depending on the event.

Amateur athletes could qualify through a single performance at an Ironman event or at the Ironman 70.3 Kraichgau event. Slots were allocated to each amateur age group category, male and female, with the number of slots given out based on that category's proportional representation of the overall field. Each age group category was tentatively allocated one qualifying spot in each qualifying event. This qualifying year marked a large de-emphasis on using selected Ironman 70.3 series races as an avenue for amateur athletes to qualify for the Ironman World Championships. The change was made to accommodate for the increased number of qualifying slots created from the newly added full Ironman events.

Other means of entry into the championship race could also be obtained through a random allocation lottery, through Ironman's Legacy program, or through the Ironman's charitable eBay auction. Handcycle competitors could qualify at Ironman Cairns (one male/one female), Ironman 70.3 Luxembourg (one male/one female) and Ironman 70.3 Buffalo Springs Lake (two male/one female)

=== Illegal lottery ===
According to a sworn complaint filed with the U.S. District Court in Tampa, Florida, Ironman illegally charged athletes for a chance to win the opportunity to compete in the Ironman World Championship. According to Florida law, the state where the World Triathlon Corporation resides, it is illegal to set up and charge for a lottery. Because WTC charged a $50 fee to enter the lottery, instead of giving away the opportunity to win a slot at the championships, they were in violation of this law. Following the complaint WTC cooperated with the United States Attorneys office and the FBI's investigation of the matter and agreed to forfeit $2,761,910, the amount collected from the lottery since October 24, 2012.

Winners of the 2015 lottery were notified on March 17, 2015, prior to the announcement of the complaint. WTC stated that these winners would be unaffected by this decision and that their slots for the upcoming championship race would be honored.

=== Non-point races ===
Prior to the 2014 Ironman Boulder race, World Triathlon Corporation's CEO, Andrew Messick, announced a redistribution of prize money to help facilitate paying ten professionals deep at each race as well as awarding larger prize purses at select races across Ironman and Ironman 70.3. As part of this initiative, WTC eliminated points and prize purses for professional triathletes at 9 Ironman events and 11 Ironman 70.3 events in 2015, all occurring within North America. Those Ironman races with no points or prize purse offered include: Ironman Boulder, Louisville, Wisconsin, Maryland, Lake Tahoe, Florida, Muskoka, Los Cabos and Lake Placid. The majority of these listed events occur after the qualifying period has ended, August, and near the date of the annual Championship event in October. This would also mark the first time since 1985 that an Ironman race will not offer a prize purse. For the 2015 Ironman Championship qualifying period this affects Ironman Lake Placid and Ironman Boulder.

=== Qualifying Ironman races ===
Date	Event	Location
Sep 7, 2014	Ironman Wisconsin	(United States) Madison, Wisconsin
Sep 14, 2014	Ironman Wales	Tenby, Pembrokeshire, Wales
Sep 21, 2014	Ironman Lake Tahoe*	(United States) Lake Tahoe, California
Sep 27, 2014	Ironman Malaysia	Langkawi, Malaysia
Sep 27, 2014	Ironman Mallorca	Alcúdia, Mallorca, Spain
Sep 28, 2014	Ironman Chattanooga	(United States) Chattanooga, Tennessee
Oct 5, 2014	Ironman Barcelona	Barcelona, Spain
Oct 11, 2014	Ironman World Championship	(United States) Kailua-Kona, Hawaii
Nov 1, 2014	Ironman Florida	(United States) Panama City Beach, Florida
Nov 9, 2014	Ironman Fortaleza	Fortaleza, Brazil
Nov 16, 2014	Ironman Arizona	(United States) Tempe, Arizona
Nov 30, 2014	Ironman Cozumel	Cozumel, Quintana Roo, Mexico
Dec 7, 2014	Ironman Western Australia	Busselton, Western Australia
Mar 7, 2015	Ironman New Zealand	Taupō, New Zealand
Mar 22, 2015	Ironman Asia-Pacific Championship	Melbourne, Australia
Mar 29, 2015	Ironman African Championship	Port Elizabeth, South Africa
Apr 12, 2015	Ironman Taiwan	Kenting, Taiwan
May 3, 2015	Ironman Australia	Port Macquarie, New South Wales, Australia
May 16, 2015	Ironman North American Championship	(United States) The Woodlands Township, Texas
May 23, 2015	Ironman Lanzarote	Puerto del Carmen, Lanzarote, Spain
May 31, 2015	Ironman Latin American Championships	Florianópolis, Brazil
Jun 14, 2015	Ironman Cairns	Cairns, Australia
Jun 28, 2015	Ironman France	Nice, France
Jun 28, 2015	Ironman Austria	Klagenfurt, Austria
Jun 28, 2015	Ironman Coeur d'Alene	(United States) Coeur d'Alene, Idaho
Jul 5, 2015	Ironman European Championship	Frankfurt, Germany
Jul 19, 2015	Ironman UK	Bolton, Greater Manchester, United Kingdom
Jul 19, 2015	Ironman Switzerland	Zürich, Switzerland
Jul 26, 2015	Ironman Lake Placid^{X}	(United States) Lake Placid, New York
Jul 26, 2015	Ironman Canada	Whistler, British Columbia, Canada
Aug 2, 2015	Ironman Maastricht-Limburg	Maastricht, Limburg, Netherlands
Aug 2, 2015	Ironman Boulder^{X}	(United States) Boulder, Colorado
Aug 15, 2015	Ironman Sweden	Kalmar, Sweden
Aug 16, 2015	Ironman Mont-Tremblant	Mont-Tremblant, Quebec, Canada
August 23, 2015	Ironman Copenhagen	Copenhagen, Denmark
Aug 23, 2015	Ironman Japan	Hokkaido, Japan

*Ironman Lake Tahoe was canceled due to smoke from the King Fire.
^{X}Amateur only competition.

=== Qualifying pro men ===
Championship participants
Points rank	Name	Country	Points total
1	Jan Frodeno^{†}	(Germany)	14680
2	Sebastian Kienle^{†}	(Germany)	12415
3	Frederik Van Lierde^{†}	(Belgium)	10455
4	Ben Hoffman	(United States)	9970
5	Andy Potts	(United States)	9725
6	Nils Frommhold	(Germany)	9685
7	Tim Van Berkel	(Australia)	8655
8	Bart Aernouts	(Belgium)	8310
9	Lionel Sanders	(Canada)	8140
10	Ronnie Schildknecht	(Switzerland)	7550
11	Cyril Viennot	(France)	7535
12	Tim Don	(United Kingdom)	7430
13	Brent McMahon	(Canada)	7310
14	Matt Trautman	(South Africa)	7195
15	Matt Hanson^{†}	(United States)	6990
16	Marino Vanhoenacker^{†}	(Belgium)	6735
17	Bas Diederen	(Netherlands)	6525
18	Tim O'Donnell	(United States)	6470
19	Patrik Nilsson^{*}	(Sweden)	6240
20	Romain Guillaume	(France)	6200
21	Cameron Brown	(New Zealand)	6145
22	Iván Raña	(Spain)	5840
23	Guilherme Manocchio	(Brazil)	5540
24	Joe Skipper	(United Kingdom)	5295
25	Michael Weiss	(Austria)	5025
26	Eneko Llanos	(Spain)	4980
27	Tyler Butterfield	(Bermuda)	4965
28	Clemente Alonso McKernan	(Spain)	4880
29	Callum Millward	(New Zealand)	4825
30	Brad Kahlefeldt	(Australia)	4715
31	David McNamee	(United Kingdom)	4695
32	Jeff Symonds^{†}	(Canada)	4675
33	Andi Boecherer	(Germany)	4530
34	Andreas Raelert	(Germany)	4505
35	Luke McKenzie	(Australia)	4490
36	Boris Stein	(Germany)	4465
37	Dylan McNeice	(New Zealand)	4445
38	Fredrik Croneborg	(Sweden)	4380
39	Igor Amorelli	(Brazil)	4340
40	Denis Chevrot	(France)	4290
41	Jordan Rapp	(United States)	4180
42	Christian Kramer	(Germany)	4165
43	Paul Ambrose	(Australia)	4155
44	Pedro Gomes	(Portugal)	4090
45	Terenzo Bozzone^{*}	(New Zealand)	4030
46	Viktor Zyemtsev	(United States)	3980
47	Kyle Buckingham	(South Africa)	3925
48	Jan Van Berkel	(Switzerland)	3895
49	Maik Twelsiek	(Germany)	3875
50	Victor Del Corral^{*}	(Spain)	3860
51	Fraser Cartmell	(United Kingdom)	3785
52	Daniel Bretscher	(United States)	3745
53	Miquel Tinto	(Spain)	3700
54	Luke Bell	(Australia)	3665
55	Matt Chrabot	(United States)	3630
56	Jeremy Jurkiewicz	(France)	3475
58	Justin Daerr^{‡}	(United States)	3440
127	Pete Jacobs^{†*}	(Australia)	930
^{†} Automatic Qualifier, ^{‡} Roll Down Qualifier, ^{*}Declined slot/Injured; Source:

=== Qualifying pro women ===
Championship participants
Points rank	Name	Country	Points total
1	Daniela Ryf^{†}	(Switzerland)	15450
2	Jodie Swallow^{†}	(United Kingdom)	14370
3	Caroline Steffen	(Switzerland)	13055
4	Rachel Joyce	(United Kingdom)	11320
5	Mirinda Carfrae^{†}	(Australia)	10275
6	Julia Gajer	(Germany)	9905
7	Mary Beth Ellis	(United States)	9515
8	Gina Crawford	(New Zealand)	9050
9	Meredith Kessler	(United States)	8960
10	Yvonne van Vlerken^{*}	(Netherlands)	8440
11	Elizabeth Lyles	(United States)	8195
12	Liz Blatchford	(Australia)	8090
13	Angela Naeth^{†}	(Canada)	7930
14	Ariane Monticeli^{†}	(Brazil)	7810
15	Heather Wurtele	(Canada)	7390
16	Lucy Gossage	(United Kingdom)	7190
17	Camilla Pedersen	(Denmark)	7055
18	Eva Wutti	(Austria)	6920
19	Diana Riesler	(Germany)	6770
20	Susie Cheetham	(United Kingdom)	6400
21	Michelle Vesterby	(Denmark)	6350
22	Amanda Stevens	(United States)	6290
23	Beth Gerdes	(United States)	6090
24	Heather Jackson	(United States)	5385
25	Sonja Tajsich^{*}	(Germany)	5360
26	Britta Martin	(New Zealand)	5340
27	Ruth Brennan-Morrey	(United States)	5325
28	Leanda Cave^{†}	(United Kingdom)	5290
29	Mareen Hufe	(Germany)	5255
30	Lisa Hütthaler	(Austria)	5195
31	Haley Chura	(United States)	5150
32	Annabel Luxford	(Australia)	5080
33	Kelly Williamson	(United States)	5055
34	Dede Griesbauer	(United States)	5040
35	Astrid Stienen	(Germany)	4840
36	Dimity-Lee Duke	(Australia)	4780
37	Corinne Abraham^{*}	(United Kingdom)	4725
38	Tine Deckers	(Belgium)	4660
39	Åsa Lundström	(Sweden)	4625
40	Shiao-yu Li	(Taiwan)	4600
41	Sarah Piampiano	(United States)	4410
42	Caitlin Snow	(United States)	4375
43	Sofie Goos^{‡}	(Belgium)	4220
45	Laurel Wassner^{‡}	(United States)	4060
46	Melissa Hauschildt^{†*}	(Australia)	4000
^{†} Automatic Qualifier, ^{‡} Roll Down Qualifier, ^{*}Declined slot/Injured; Source:
