= 2014 Ironman World Championship =

2014 triathlon competition

Ironman World Championship
- Location: Kailua-Kona, Hawaii
- Date: October 11, 2014

Champions
- Men: (Germany) Sebastian Kienle
- Women: (Australia) Mirinda Carfrae

The 2014 Ironman World Championship was a long distance triathlon competition that was held on October 11, 2014 in Kailua-Kona, Hawaii. The event was won by Sebastian Kienle of Germany and Australia's Mirinda Carfrae. It was the 38th edition of the Ironman World Championship, which has been held annually in Hawaii since 1978, with an additional race in 1982. The championship was organized by the World Triathlon Corporation (WTC) and awarded a total purse prize of $650,000.

== Championship results ==
=== Men ===
Pos.	Time (h:mm:ss)	Name	Country	Split times (h:mm:ss / m:ss)				
Pos.	Time (h:mm:ss)	Name	Country	Swim	T1	Bike	T2	Run
Gold medal	8:14:18	Sebastian Kienle	Germany	54:38	2:01	4:20:46	2:17	2:54:36
Silver medal	8:19:23	Ben Hoffman	United States	51:20	1:55	4:32:20	2:23	2:51:25
Bronze medal	8:20:32	Jan Frodeno	Germany	50:56	1:51	4:37:19	2:40	2:47:46
4	8:21:38	Andy Potts	United States	50:56	1:50	4:36:56	3:38	2:48:18
5	8:22:19	Cyril Viennot	France	54:32	1:57	4:31:18	2:37	2:51:55
6	8:22:29	Nils Frommhold	Germany	51:14	1:55	4:34:11	2:24	2:52:45
7	8:23:26	Tim Van Berkel	Australia	51:21	2:04	4:36:45	2:23	2:50:53
8	8:24:11	Frederik Van Lierde	Belgium	51:03	2:13	4:32:17	2:17	2:56:21
9	8:28:28	Bart Aernouts	Belgium	55:43	2:14	4:37:47	2:32	2:50:12
10	8:30:15	Romain Guillaume	France	51:08	1:55	4:34:23	2:51	2:59:58

=== Women ===
Pos.	Time (h:mm:ss)	Name	Country	Split times (h:mm:ss / m:ss)				
Pos.	Time (h:mm:ss)	Name	Country	Swim	T1	Bike	T2	Run
Gold medal	9:00:55	Mirinda Carfrae	Australia	1:00:14	2:02	5:05:48	2:25	2:50:26
Silver medal	9:02:57	Daniela Ryf	Switzerland	56:55	2:02	4:54:33	2:27	3:07:00
Bronze medal	9:04:23	Rachel Joyce	Great Britain	56:47	1:55	4:56:49	2:25	3:08:45
4	9:10:19	Jodie Swallow	Great Britain	54:28	2:03	5:02:46	2:17	3:08:45
5	9:12:43	Caroline Steffen	Switzerland	56:53	2:08	5:02:03	2:56	3:08:43
6	9:16:58	Julia Gajer	Germany	1:00:17	2:35	5:06:13	3:14	3:04:39
7	9:18:11	Liz Lyles	United States	1:00:19	2:03	5:10:15	2:10	3:03:24
8	9:19:21	Gina Crawford	New Zealand	55:04	2:18	5:17:30	2:40	3:01:49
9	9:20:46	Mary Beth Ellis	United States	54:56	1:58	5:00:04	2:24	3:21:24
10	9:23:34	Liz Blatchford	United Kingdom	54:59	2:01	5:13:30	2:48	3:10:16

== Qualification ==
For entry into the 2014 World Championship race, amateur athletes were required to qualify through a performance at an Ironman or selected Ironman 70.3 series race. Entry into the championship race could also be obtained through a random allocation lottery, through Ironman's Legacy program, or through the Ironman’s charitable eBay auction. The division of athletes is divided into professional, age group, physically challenged, and hand cycle divisions.

For professional triathletes, a point system determines which professional triathletes qualify for the championship race. To qualify, points are earned by competing in WTC sanctioned Ironman and Ironman 70.3 events throughout the qualifying year. For the 2014 championship race that period was August 31, 2013 to August 24, 2014. The top 50 male and top 35 female pros in points at the end of the qualifying year qualified to race in Kona. An athlete's five highest scoring races were counted in the point totals. At least one Ironman race must have been completed and only three Ironman 70.3 races counted towards an athlete's overall point total. Prior champions of a WTC Championship receive an automatic entry for the Championship race for a period of five years after their last championship performance provided that they competed in at least one full-distance Ironman race during the qualifying year. Their entry does not count toward the number of available qualifying spots. Available prize money to professional triathletes for qualifying race ranged from $25,000 to $125,000.

The 2014 Ironman series consisted of 29 Ironman races plus the 2013 Ironman World Championship which was itself a qualifier for the 2014 Championship.

=== Qualifying Ironman races ===
Date	Event	Location
Sep 8, 2013	Ironman Wales	Tenby, Pembrokeshire, Wales
Sep 8, 2013	Ironman Wisconsin	(United States) Madison, Wisconsin
Oct 12, 2013	Ironman World Championship	(United States) Kailua-Kona, Hawaii
Nov 2, 2013	Ironman Florida	(United States) Panama City Beach, Florida
Nov 17, 2013	Ironman Arizona	(United States) Tempe, Arizona
Dec 1, 2013	Ironman Cozumel	Cozumel, Quintana Roo, Mexico
Dec 8, 2013	Ironman Western Australia	Busselton, Western Australia
Mar 1, 2014	Ironman New Zealand	Taupō, New Zealand
Mar 23, 2014	Ironman Asia Pacific Championship	Melbourne, Australia
Mar 30, 2014	Ironman Los Cabos	Los Cabos, Mexico
Apr 6, 2014	Ironman South Africa	Port Elizabeth, South Africa
May 4, 2014	Ironman Australia	Port Macquarie, New South Wales, Australia
May 17, 2014	Ironman Lanzarote	Puerto del Carmen, Lanzarote, Spain
May 17, 2014	Ironman Texas	(United States) The Woodlands Township, Texas
May 25, 2014	Ironman Brazil	Florianópolis Island, Brazil
Jun 8, 2014	Ironman Cairns	Cairns, Australia
Jun 29, 2014	Ironman Austria	Klagenfurt, Austria
Jun 29, 2014	Ironman France	Nice, France
Jun 29, 2014	Ironman Coeur d'Alene	(United States) Coeur d'Alene, Idaho
Jul 6, 2014	Ironman European Championship	Frankfurt, Germany
July 20, 2014	Ironman UK	Bolton, Greater Manchester, United Kingdom
Jul 27, 2014	Ironman Switzerland	Zürich, Switzerland
Jul 27, 2014	Ironman Lake Placid	(United States) Lake Placid, New York
Jul 27, 2014	Ironman Canada	Whistler, British Columbia, Canada
Aug 3, 2014	Ironman Boulder	(United States) Boulder, Colorado
Aug 16, 2014	Ironman Sweden	Kalmar, Sweden
Aug 17, 2014	Ironman Mont-Tremblant	Mont-Tremblant, Quebec, Canada
Aug 24, 2014	Ironman Japan	Hokkaido, Japan
Aug 24, 2014	Ironman Copenhagen	Copenhagen, Denmark
Aug 24, 2014	Ironman Louisville	(United States) Louisville, Kentucky

=== Qualifying pro men ===
Championship participants
Points rank	Name	Country	Points total
1	Sebastian Kienle^{†}	(Germany)	14770
2	Frederik Van Lierde^{†}	(Belgium)	11640
3	Bart Aernouts	(Belgium)	8440
4	Tyler Butterfield	(Bermuda)	8420
5	Timothy O'Donnell	(United States)	8077
6	Iván Raña	(Spain)	7855
7	Luke McKenzie	(Australia)	7580
8	James Cunnama	(South Africa)	7405
9	Jan Frodeno	(Germany)	6640
10	Terenzo Bozzone	(New Zealand)	6565
11	Victor Morales	(Spain)	6500
12	Andy Potts	(United States)	5610
13	Michael Weiss	(Austria)	5495
14	Igor Amorelli	(Brazil)	5495
15	Matthew Russell	(United States)	5475
16	Timo Bracht^{††}	(Germany)	5410
17	Joe Gambles	(Australia)	5380
18	Tim Van Berkel	(Australia)	5370
19	Daniel Halksworth	(United Kingdom)	5230
20	Chris McDonald	(United States)	5015
21	David Plese	(Slovenia)	4925
22	Marino Vanhoenacker	(Belgium)	4920
23	Eneko Llanos	(Spain)	4905
24	Maik Twelsiek	(Germany)	4755
25	Elliot Holtham	(Canada)	4725
26	Faris Al-Sultan	(Germany)	4660
27	T. J. Tollakson	(United States)	4640
28	Cameron Brown^{††}	(New Zealand)	4545
29	Paul Matthews	(Australia)	4510
30	Andrew Starykowicz	(United States)	4450
31	Harry Wiltshire	(United Kingdom)	4385
32	Marek Jaskolka	(Poland)	4345
33	Richie Cunningham	(Australia)	4335
34	Christian Kramer	(Germany)	4325
35	Jeremy Jurkiewicz	(France)	4280
36	David Dellow^{††}	(Australia)	4250
37	Victor Zyemtsev^{††}	(Ukraine)	4280
38	Cyril Viennot	(France)	4240
39	Peter Robertson^{††}	(Australia)	4215
40	Filip Ospalý	(Czech Republic)	4130
41	Ben Hoffman	(United States)	4095
42	Christian Brader	(Germany)	4075
43	Domenico Passuello^{††}	(Italy)	4075
44	Nils Frommhold	(Germany)	4060
45	Justin Daerr	(United States)	4050
46	Kyle Buckingham	(South Africa)	4024
47	Dirk Bockel^{††}	(Luxembourg)	4000
48	Romain Guillaume	(France)	3980
49	Marko Albert	(Estonia)	3935
50	Ronnie Schildknecht	(Switzerland)	3915
51	Craig Alexander^{†}	(Australia)	3890
52	Bevan Docherty	(New Zealand)	3675
53	Daniel Fontana	(Italy)	3645
54	Tim Reed	(Australia)	3625
55	Andreas Raelert^{‡}	(Germany)	3610
56	Axel Zeebroek^{‡}	(Belgium)	3515
57	Boris Stein^{‡}	(Germany)	3500
58	Paul Ambrose^{‡}	(United Kingdom)	3440
118	Pete Jacobs^{†}	(Australia)	1020
^{†} Automatic Qualifier, ^{‡} Roll Down Qualifier, ^{††}Declined slot/Injured; Source:

=== Qualifying pro women ===
Championship participants
Points rank	Name	Country	Points total
1	Rachel Joyce	(United Kingdom)	10240
2	Meredith Kessler	(United States)	10100
3	Liz Blatchford	(Australia)	9985
4	Caroline Steffen	(Switzerland)	9750
5	Mirinda Carfrae^{†}	(Australia)	9688
6	Gina Crawford	(New Zealand)	9325
7	Yvonne van Vlerken	(Netherlands)	8595
8	Linsey Corbin	(United States)	8140
9	Caitlin Snow	(United States)	8005
10	Elizabeth Lyles	(United States)	7860
11	Daniela Ryf	(Switzerland)	7810
12	Amber Ferreira	(United States)	7365
13	Melissa Hauschildt^{†} ^{††}	(Australia)	7250
14	Leanda Cave^{†}	(United Kingdom)	6770
15	Sara Gross	(Canada)	6620
16	Catriona Morrison	(United Kingdom)	6240
17	Mary Beth Ellis	(United States)	6210
18	Melanie Burke	(New Zealand)	6190
19	Åsa Lundström	(Sweden)	6090
20	Beth Shutt	(United States)	6090
21	Michelle Vesterby	(Denmark)	6025
22	Kristin Möller	(Germany)	5750
23	Lucy Gossage	(United Kingdom)	5600
24	Amanda Stevens	(United States)	5430
25	Jodie Swallow	(United Kingdom)	5390
26	Sophie Goos	(Belgium)	5365
27	Natascha Badmann	(Switzerland)	5355
28	Julia Gajer	(Germany)	5310
29	Lisa Roberts	(United States)	5285
30	Corinne Abraham	(United Kingdom)	5280
31	Simone Brändli	(Switzerland)	5240
32	Jackie Arendt	(United States)	5170
33	Maureen Hufe^{††}	(Germany)	5165
34	Kimberly Schwabenbauer	(United States)	5050
35	Bree Wee	(United States)	5040
36	Jessie Donavan^{††}	(United States)	5000
37	Heather Wurtele	(Canada)	5000
38	Kelly Williamson	(United States)	4975
39	Katja Konschak^{‡}	(Germany)	4915
^{†} Automatic Qualifier, ^{‡} Roll Down Qualifier, ^{††}Declined slot/Injured; Source:

== Disabled ==
Racing driver and paracyclist Alex Zanardi completed the 2014 Ironman World Championship in a time of 9:47:14, ranking 272nd overall and 19th out of 247 in the 45- to 49-year-old age group category. He used a handbike for the cycling section and an Olympic wheelchair for the running section.
