= August 26 Revolt =

Revolt in Portugal on 26 August 1931

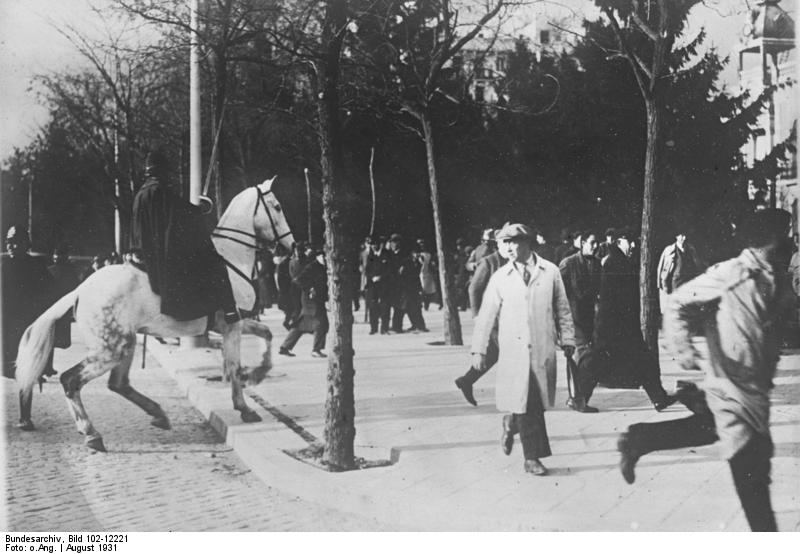
The Portuguese Republican National Guard, mounted in Lisbon, attacking demonstrators with swords, August 1931

The Revolt of 26 August 1931 was an attempted military coup, one of the last movements associated with the Reviralho, which took place in Lisbon, Portugal, and involved mainly the military forces of the 7th Caçadores Regiment and a group of airmen stationed at Alverca Air Base. The revolt was planned to coincide with the Madeira uprising, but disagreements among the leaders of the democratic opposition led to a delay in its launch, one of the main causes of its failure.

The revolt lasted about nine hours and caused around 40 deaths. It was quelled by the energetic action of the Military Governor of Lisbon, Brigadier Daniel de Sousa, who was soon promoted to general. The action of the National Republican Guard forces commanded by General Farinha Beirão was also significant. David Neto, Mário Pessoa Costa and Júlio Botelho Moniz also played a prominent role in defending the regime.

The revolt was led by military personnel and civilians linked to the Grupo dos Budas and the Paris League, with Lieutenant Colonel Utra Machado, Major Sarmento de Beires, Colonel António Augusto Dias Antunes, Colonel Hélder Armando dos Santos Ribeiro and Agatão Lança as its main figures. The main leaders of the revolt were deported to Timor on the ship Pedro Gomes.

A total of 42 people were killed during the revolt.
