= Pedro Gómez =

Pedro Gómez or Gomez may refer to:

- Pedro Daniel Gómez (born 1990), Mexican racewalker
- Pedro Nel Gómez (1899–1984), Colombian engineer, architect, painter, and sculptor
- Pedro Gómez de Córdoba (died 1598), Roman Catholic prelate
- Pedro Gómez de Don Benito (1492–1567), Spanish conquistador
- Pedro Gómez de la Serna (1806–1871), Spanish jurist and politician
- Pedro Gómez Gómez (born 1970), Mexican politician
- Pedro Gomez (journalist) (1962–2021), Cuban-American sports reporter
- Pedro Gómez Labrador (1755–1852), Spanish diplomat and nobleman
- Pedro Gómez Malaver (died 1551), Roman Catholic prelate
- Pedro Gómez Valderrama (1923–1992), Colombian lawyer, writer and diplomat

== See also ==
- Pedro Gomes (disambiguation)
- Peter Gomez (disambiguation)
