= Pedro Gomes (disambiguation) =

Pedro Gomes is a Brazilian municipality.

Pedro Gomes may also refer to:

- Pedro Gomes (triathlete) (born 1983), Portuguese triathlete
- Pedro Gomes (footballer, born 1941), Portuguese footballer and manager
- Pedro Gomes (footballer, born 2003), Portuguese footballer

== See also ==
- Pedro Gomez (disambiguation)
- Peter Gomes (disambiguation)
