= Peter Gomez =

Peter Gomez or Gomes may refer to:

- Peter Paul Gomez, Pakistani politician
- Peter J. Gomes (1942–2011), American theologian
- Peter Gomez Homen, Italian journalist

== See also ==
- Pedro Gomez (disambiguation)
- Pedro Gomes (disambiguation)
