= Sebastian Kienle =

German long-distance triathlete

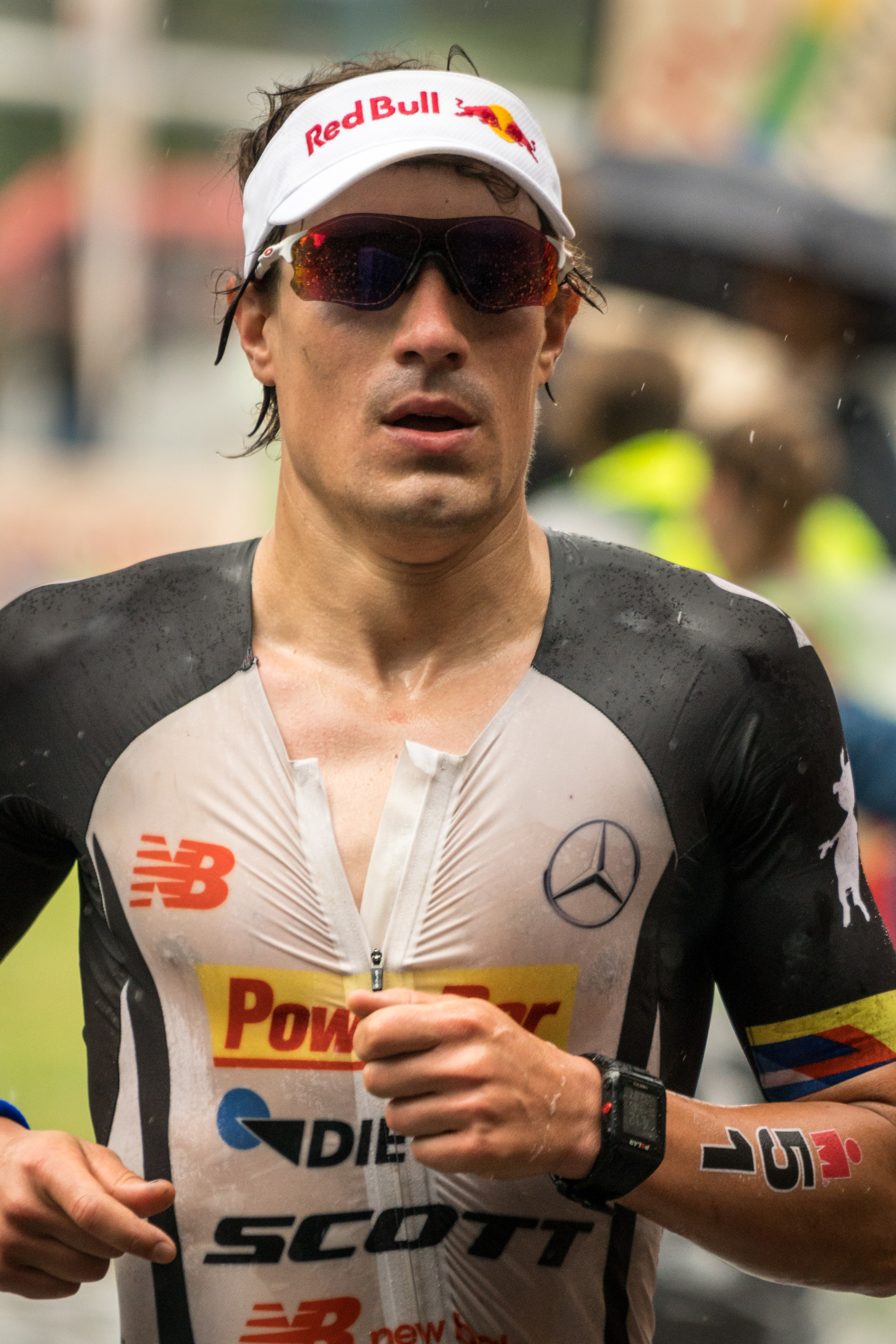
- Kienle racing at Ironman Germany in 2016

Personal information
- Born: 6 July 1984 (age 41)
- Height: 1.80 m (5 ft 11 in)
- Weight: 73 kg (161 lb)

Sport
- Country: Germany
- Sport: Triathlon
- Team: Tri-Team Heuchelberg
- Coached by: Philipp Seipp
Medal record
Representing Germany
Men's triathlon
Ironman World Championship
Bronze medal – third place	2019	Individual
Silver medal – second place	2016	Individual
Gold medal – first place	2014	Individual
Bronze medal – third place	2013	Individual
Ironman 70.3 World Championship
Silver medal – second place	2016	Individual
Silver medal – second place	2015	Individual
Gold medal – first place	2013	Individual
Gold medal – first place	2012	Individual

Sebastian Kienle (born 6 July 1984) is a German long-distance triathlete. He is the winner of the 2014 Ironman World Championship, as well as the 2012 and 2013 Ironman 70.3 World Championship.

== Athletic career ==
Kienle was exposed to the sport of triathlon for the first time at the age of 8 and then knew that he wanted to grow up to be a professional triathlete. He began competing in triathlons at the age of 12. Kienle competed in his first XTERRA Triathlon in 2005 in Germany, in which he won and had "an absolutely great race." That race prompted him to return the next year where he defended his title.

In 2009, he won Ironman 70.3 Germany in Wiesbaden, holding off 70.3 World Champion Michael Raelert. In 2010, he placed second behind Rasmus Henning at the 2010 Challenge Roth triathlon.

In 2012, Kienle was able to use his strong bike talent to propel himself to a victory in 2012 at the Ironman 70.3 World Championships. He placed 4th a month later at the 2012 Ironman World Championships, posting the second fastest bike split of the day - despite incurring a flat tire. The following year, in 2013, he posted somewhat lackluster results during the season; however, Kienle defended his Ironman 70.3 title by winning the 2013 World Championship race. He turned out the second fastest bike split of the day to help him win by two minutes over Terenzo Bozzone.

== Notable results ==
Some of Kienle's notable achievements include:

Results
Date	Event	Place
2019	2019 Ironman World Championship	3
2019	Ironman European Championship	2
2017	2017 Ironman World Championship	4
2016	2016 Ironman World Championship	2
2016	Ironman European Championship	7
2016	Ironman 70.3 Chattanooga	1
2015	2015 Ironman World Championship	8
2015	2015 Ironman 70.3 World Championship	2
2015	Ironman 70.3 Kraichgau	1
2014	2014 Ironman World Championship	1
2014	Ironman European Championship	1
2014	Ironman 70.3 Kraichgau	1
2014	Ironman 70.3 California	3
2013	2013 Ironman World Championship	3
2013	2013 Ironman 70.3 World Championship	1
2013	Ironman European Championship	9
2012	2012 XTERRA World Championship	14
2012	2012 Ironman World Championship	4
2012	2012 Ironman 70.3 World Championship	1
2012	Ironman European Championship	2
2012	XTERRA Germany	2
2012	Challenge Kraichgau Long Distance Triathlon European Championships	2
2012	Ironman 70.3 Texas	2
2011	Ironman Arizona	6
2011	Ironman 70.3 Miami	1
2011	Challenge Roth	2
2010	Ironman 70.3 Germany	2
2010	Challenge Roth	2
2009	Ironman 70.3 Germany	1
2009	Challenge Kraichgau	1
2008	2008 Ironman 70.3 World Championship	11
2008	Ironman 70.3 Switzerland	3
