= Greg Bennett (triathlete) =

Australian athlete (b.1972)

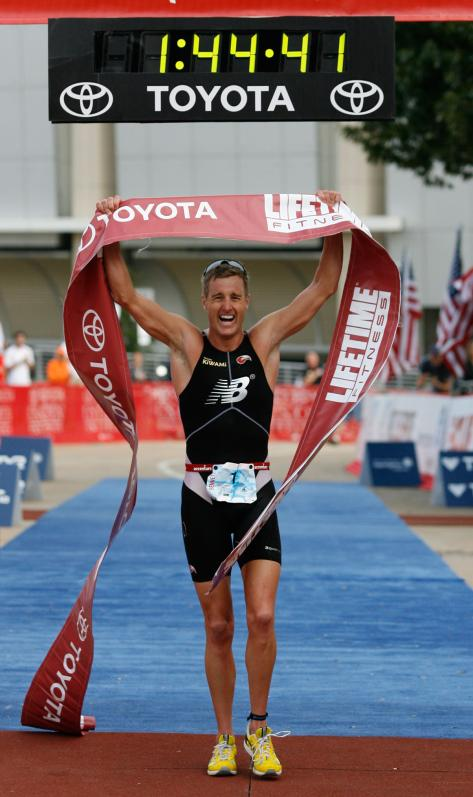
- 2007 Dallas Win in the Lifetime Triathlon US Open Series Final

Personal information
- Nickname: GB
- Born: 2 January 1972 (age 54) Sydney, New South Wales
- Height: 5 ft 11 in (1.80 m)
- Weight: 69 kg (152 lb)

Sport
- Country: Australia
- Team: Bennett Endurance
- Turned pro: 1990
Medal record
Representing Australia
Men's triathlon
ITU Triathlon World Cup
Gold medal – first place	2003	Elite
Gold medal – first place	2002	Elite

Greg Bennett (born 2 January 1972, in Sydney, New South Wales) is a motivational speaker, corporate trainer, and entrepreneur. He is a retired professional Olympic athlete from Australia. He competed in triathlon since the age of 14 as a student at Newington College (1984–1989). Greg became a dual Australian and USA citizen in 2012.

Bennett has won two International Triathlon Union World Series titles, one Triathlon World Championship, and six World Cup titles. He was ranked the world's number-one triathlete in 2002 and 2003. Bennett qualified for the Australian Olympic team at Athens, 2004 and Beijing, 2008 Summer Olympics. At the 2004 Summer Olympics. He placed fourth with a total time of 1:51:41.58. Greg won three Australian National titles in 1998, 1999, and 2000 (long course) and two Oceania titles in 1998 and 1999.

Bennett started eighty-two ITU World Cups, won six, and was on the podium twenty-three times. Bennett represented Australia at thirteen World Championship Triathlons, three World Duathlon Championships with a silver medal in 2002, two Goodwill games, and qualified for two Australian Olympic teams.

Bennett won the world's richest ever Triathlon prize purse in 2007 by winning all 5 of the Life Time Fitness Grand Slam city series, which included the LTF Minneapolis Triathlon, Nautica New York Triathlon, Accenture Chicago Triathlon, Kaiser Permanente Los Angeles and the Toyota USA Open Dallas Triathlon.

Bennett won the Life Time Series for three consecutive years: 2006, 2007, and 2008. Greg won eleven of fifteen starts; he was second in one and third in the remaining three. Bennett placed second in the 2009 Life Time Fitness series even after being hit by a motorist in August 2009 after a training ride in his hometown of Boulder, CO.

Bennett won the 2011 World Championship (no drafting) in Des Moines, Iowa, just shy of his 40th Birthday.

Bennett was voted Triathlete of the Year in 2003 and 2007 by Triathlete magazine and voted top 15 greatest triathlete of all time by Inside Triathlon Magazine 2012.

Bennett raced professionally for 27 years. He competed in over 500 professional Triathlons and won 100+ international races.

Greg Bennett is married to US Olympic Triathlete Laura Bennett. Laura Bennett raced the 2008 Beijing Olympics and 2012 London Olympics and, like Greg, finished in 4th place in Beijing. Often received the title throughout their careers as the ‘world fittest couple,’ the Bennetts were contenders of that title during their 16 years as married Professional Triathletes.

== Results ==
World Triathlon Series Champion 2002 and 2003
Ironman 5150 Triathlon World Champion, 2011
Three-time Australian National Champion 1998, 1999, 2000 (long course)
Three-time USA Grand Slam Series Champion 2006, 2007, 2008
Triathlete Of The Year 2003 and 2007
Awarded the International Triathlon Union Presidents Cup in 2002

Undefeated Gram Slam Series Champion in 2007

- Minneapolis
- New York
- Chicago
- Los Angeles
- Dallas

Over 100 International wins, including:

Major USA Titles

- Four-time Los Angeles Triathlon 2000, 2006, 2007, 2008
- Four-time New York Triathlon 2006, 2007, 2008, 2009
- Two Time Chicago 2007, 2014
- Two times Dallas 2007, 2008

Six-time World Cup Champion

- Monaco 1997
- Sydney, Australia 1999
- Cancun, Mexico 2001
- Hamburg, Germany 2002
- Gamagori, Japan 2002
- Ishigaki, Japan 2003

Six Ironman 70.3 from 12 starts

- Augusta USA 2009
- Hawaii USA 2012
- Vineman USA 2012
- Muncie, Indiana 2012
- Raleigh, North Carolina 2013
- Buffalo Springs, Texas USA 2013

Represented Australia at Triathlon World Championships 1994 - 2010

- Wellington, NZ 1994
- Cancun, Mexico 1995
- Cleveland, US 1996
- Perth, Australia 1997
- Lausanne Switzerland 1998
- Montreal, Canada 1999
- Perth, AU 2000
- Cancun Mexico 2002
- Queenstown NZ 2003
- Madera, Portugal 2004
- Gamagori, Japan 2005
- Lausanne Switzerland 2006
- Vancouver, Canada 2008
- Budapest, Hungary 2010

Represented Australia at Duathlon World Championships – 1999 - 2005

- North Carolina USA, 1999
- Georgia USA, 2002
- Newcastle Australia, 2005

Represented Australia at the Olympic Games

- Athens, Greece 2004
- Reserve
- Sydney Australia 2000
- Beijing China 2008

Represented Australia at the Goodwill Games

- New York USA 1997
- Brisbane Australia 2001
