= Carrie Lester =

Australian triathlete

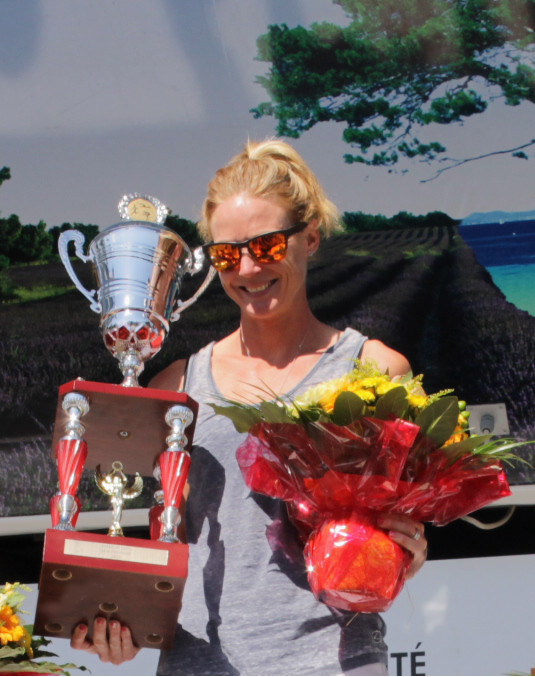
Carrie Lester after winning Embrunman in 2016.

Carrie Lester (born 1981) is an Australian triathlete. She competes in the Ironman Triathlon and finished tenth in the 2016 Ironman World Championship. Lester won the Port Macquarie Ironman 70.3 in 2011 as well as the Ironman events at Cairns in 2012, and at Chattanooga in 2015. She also won the Embrunman event in 2016.

Lester has a degree in Business Management and Marketing from the Queensland University of Technology.
