= Lisa Marangon =

Australian triathlete

Lisa Marangon (born 12 June 1980) is a Sydney, Australia based professional triathlete.

== Career ==
Marangon won her first major professional race, the Busselton, Western Australia half ironman on 5 May 2007. The race consisted of a 1.9 kilometre swim, a 90.1 kilometre bike and a 21.1 kilometre run.

A single mum, Marangon won the 18- to 24-year-old age group at the 2003 Ironman Australia in Forster and qualified for the Hawaii World Championships. In training for those world championships, she won the New South Wales Duathlon Championships in the 20-24 age group. She finished second in her age group in Kona.

In 2004, she won the 18-24 age group at the Australian Ironman for a second year. At the World Championships, she finished third. She turned professional in 2004. At the 2009 ITU World Long Course Championships held in Perth, she finished seventh, maintaining her number one world ranking in long-distance triathlons.

On 25 July 2010 Marangon took 3rd place in the Lake Placid Ironman.

On 30 July 2016 Marangon released a statement that she will receive a four year ban by the Australian Sports Anti-Doping Authority for testing positive for the banned substance Ostarine. The test result originated from a sample taken in January 2016 at the Challenge Melbourne event, where Marangon finished 5th.

== Achievements ==
- 3rd Lake Placid 2010
- 1st Half Ironman Busselton 2007
- 2nd Olympic Cronulla 2007
- 3rd Long-course championships Huskisson 2007
- 9th Ironman Western Australia Busselton 2006
- 2nd 70.3 Port Macquarie 2006
- 3rd Ironman Korea 2005
- Turned professional 2004
- 3rd 18-24 Age-Group Ironman Triathlon Hawaii 2004
- 1st 18-24 Age-Group Forster 2004
- 2nd 18-24 Age-Group Ironman Triathlon Hawaii 2003
- 1st 20-24 Duathlon Championships New South Wales 2003
- 1st 18-24 Age-Group Forster 2003
