= Pedro Gómez de Don Benito =

Personal details
- Born: 1492 Don Benito, Badajoz, Extremadura, Spain
- Died: 1567? Chile, Viceroyalty of Peru
- Occupation: Government
- Profession: Military

Pedro Gómez de Don Benito (1492–1567) was a Spanish nobleman, conquistador of Guatemala, Mexico, Peru and Chile. Regidor and Alcalde of Santiago.

== Biography ==
Pedro Gómez de Don Benito arrived in Chile, in the expedition of Diego de Almagro. Gómez occupied the most important hierarchical positions as Maestre de Campo, General, Alferez real (1560), Encomendero and founder of La Serena and Santiago.

== Family ==
Born in Badajoz, was the son of Juan Gómez and Marina Sánchez. His wife was Isabel Pardo Parraguéz daughter of Bartolomé Pardo Parraguez (conquistador, born in Galicia) and María de Torres Zapata. Gómez and wife had numerous sons Juan Gómez, Pedro Gómez, Francisca Gómez Pajuelo, Elena Gómez Pardo, María Gómez Pardo, Leonor Gómez Pardo and Benita Gómez Pardo. Pedro Gómez had a natural son with a native, named Juan Gómez de Benito (captain, born in Peru).
