= Pavel Šimko =

Slovak triathlete

Personal information
- Born: 13 February 1982 (age 44) Poprad, Slovakia
- Height: 1.85 m (6 ft 1 in)
- Weight: 75 kg (165 lb)

Sport
- Country: Slovakia

Pavel Šimko (born February 13, 1982, in Poprad) is a triathlete from Slovakia. Šimko was the nation's first triathlete to compete at the 2008 Summer Olympics in Beijing. During the swimming leg, Šimko was kicked by one of the competitors on top of his head causing him to lose his consciousness in the water, and was rescued by boat crew. Suffered from an endured pain, Šimko sought medical attention, and did not thereby finish the swimming leg and even the entire course.
