= Meredith Kessler =

American triathlete and ironman (born 1978)

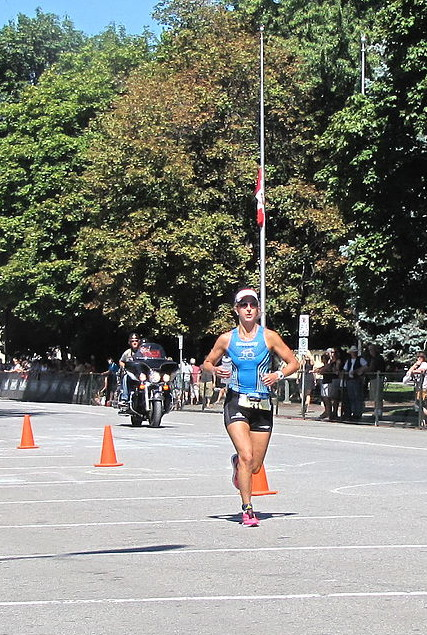
- Kessler at Ironman Canada in 2011

Personal information
- Born: June 28, 1978 (age 48)
- Height: 5 ft 8 in (1.73 m)
- Weight: 128 lb (58 kg)

Sport
- Country: United States
- Turned pro: 2010
Medal record
Women's Triathlon
Representing United States
Triathlon
ITU Long Distance World Championships
Bronze medal – third place	2011	Individual

Meredith Brooke Kessler (born June 28, 1978) is an American professional triathlete from Columbus, Ohio, who races in long distance, non-drafting triathlon events. She took third place at the 2011 ITU Long Distance Triathlon World Championships and has won numerous Ironman and half-Ironman distance races as both an amateur and a professional. She was named USA Triathlon's 2014 Non-Drafting Athlete of the Year.

== Early life ==
Kessler was born Meredith Keeran to parents Keith and Debbie and raised in Columbus, OH.

== Career ==
Growing up, she was a four-sport athlete playing field hockey, swimming, track, lacrosse and attending Columbus Academy. In 1996, after high school, she attended Syracuse University on a Division I athletic scholarship where she participated in field hockey and track. She graduated in 2000 with a degree in nutrition and hospitality management taking a job as a manager at the Ritz-Carlton Hotel Company in Half Moon Bay, California. It was also at this time she purchased a triathlon bike with her graduation money and jumped into Ironman racing. She later took a job in investment banking with RBC Capital Markets working 60 hours per week while still training 15 to 18 hours per week.

As an amateur, Kessler averaged four Ironman races a year on a loosely put together training schedule. In order to seek more structure with her training she sought out Matt Dixon as her coach in 2007. In 2009, she made the switch to become a professional triathlete, quitting her job at RBC. In her first race as a pro, she placed 7th at Ironman Arizona. She would have three Ironman podium finishes in her first year as a pro, including a win at Ironman Canada 2010. The following year in 2011, Kessler dealt with hyponatremia and hypernatremia nutritional issues at her first two big races of the race season at Ironman St. George and Ironman Coeur d’Alene. However, she rebounded to take first place at Rev3 Portland, then took a third place podium spot at the ITU Long Distance World Championships in Henderson, NV, before rounding out the year with her fastest Ironman time ever, almost breaking the nine-hour barrier at Ironman Arizona.

As a professional, Kessler has since recorded over a dozen first-place finishes in long distance triathlon, including five consecutive wins at Ironman New Zealand, three consecutive Ironman Arizona wins, and three consecutive at Ironman 70.3 St. George.

Following her 9th Ironman race win at Ironman Arizona in November 2015, Kessler and coach Matt Dixon mutually parted ways while Dixon expressing admiration and respect for her.

== Notable results ==
Kessler's race results include:

Results list

Year	Event	Place
2019	Challenge Wanaka	2nd
2019	Ironman New Zealand	3rd
2019	Ironman 70.3 Texas	5th
2019	St. Anthony’s Triathlon	4th
2019	Ironman 70.3 Mont-Tremblant	3rd
2019	Ironman 70.3 Steelhead	2nd
2019	Ironman 70.3 Santa Rosa	8th
2019	Ironman 70.3 Boulder	3rd
2018	Ironman Texas	6th
2018	Ironman 70.3 St. George	5th
2018	Ironman 70.3 Chattanooga	2nd
2018	Ironman 70.3 Raleigh	1st
2018	Ironman 70.3 Mont-Tremblant	1st
2018	Ironman Mont-Tremblant	3rd
2018	Ironman World Championship	DNF
2018	Ironman Arizona	6th
2018	Challenge Daytona	3rd
2017	Ironman New Zealand	3rd
2016	Ironman 70.3 Taupo	1st
2016	Ironman Arizona	1st
2016	Ironman 70.3 World Championship	35th
2016	Ironman 70.3 Mont-Tremblant	4th
2016	Ironman 70.3 St. George	3rd
2016	Ironman 70.3 Raleigh	2nd
2016	Ironman New Zealand	1st
2015	Ironman Arizona	1st
2015	Ironman 70.3 St. George	2nd
2015	Ironman 70.3 Raleigh	1st
2015	Challenge Williamsburg	1st
2015	Ironman 70.3 Mont-Tremblant	1st
2015	Ironman 70.3 Vineman	1st
2015	Ironman 70.3 World Championship	DNF
2015	Ironman World Championship	26th
2015	Ironman New Zealand	1st
2014	Ironman Arizona	1st
2014	Ironman World Championship	DNF
2014	Ironman 70.3 World Championship	4th
2014	Challenge New Albany	1st
2014	Ironman 70.3 Vineman	1st
2014	Ironman 70.3 Mont-Tremblant	1st
2014	Ironman 70.3 St. George	1st
2014	Ironman 70.3 Oceanside	3rd
2014	Ironman New Zealand	1st
2013	Ironman 70.3 Auckland	3rd
2013	Ironman New Zealand	1st
2013	Ironman Melbourne	12th
2013	Ironman 70.3 St. George	1st
2013	Columbia 5150	2nd
2013	Rev 3 Quassy	4th
2013	Ironman 70.3 Vineman	1st
2013	Ironman 70.3 Lake Stevens	1st
2013	Hy-Vee Triathlon	7th
2013	Ironman World Championship	7th
2013	Rev 3 Florida Half	1st
2013	Ironman Arizona	2nd
2012	Ironman New Zealand	1st
2012	Ironman 70.3 Oceanside	3rd
2012	Ironman St. George	1st
2012	Ironman 70.3 Eagleman	1st
2012	Ironman Coeur d’Alene	1st
2012	Rev 3 Portland	2nd
2012	Ironman 70.3 Vineman	1st
2012	Ironman 70.3 World Championship	23rd
2012	Ironman Florida	4th
2012	Ironman Arizona	2nd
2011	Ironman Arizona	3rd
2011	ITU Long Distance Triathlon World Championships	3rd
2011	Rev 3 Anderson	3rd
2011	Ironman Wisconsin	2nd
2011	Ironman Canada	3rd
2011	Ironman 70.3 Vineman	4th
2011	Rev 3 Portland	1st
2011	Ironman 70.3 Texas	8th
2010	Ironman Arizona	4th
2010	Ironman World Championship	26th
2010	Ironman Canada	1st
2010	Ironman 70.3 Vineman	7th
2010	Ironman Coeur d’Alene	2nd
2010	The Giant Race 2010	3rd
2010	Ironman St. George	2nd
2010	Ironman 70.3 New Orleans	4th
2009	Ironman Arizona	7th

DNF = did not finish

== Personal life ==
Kessler married husband Aaron in 2008. They were high school sweethearts and he was taught by her mother in first grade.

In March 2013, Kessler was driving her automobile and hit a pedestrian. She, "briefly stopped and checked on the victim... Then returned to her vehicle and drove off." In August 2013, she was charged with felony hit-and-run. The charges were later reduced to misdemeanor hit-and-run with Kessler entering an open plea agreement, admitting to hitting the plaintiff and leaving the scene of the accident. The sentence included three years of probation and restitution. Kessler and the pedestrian also settled in the civil court in March 2015; according to the pedestrian's attorney, the final settlement was $300,000.
