= Bruno Clerbout =

Belgian triathlete

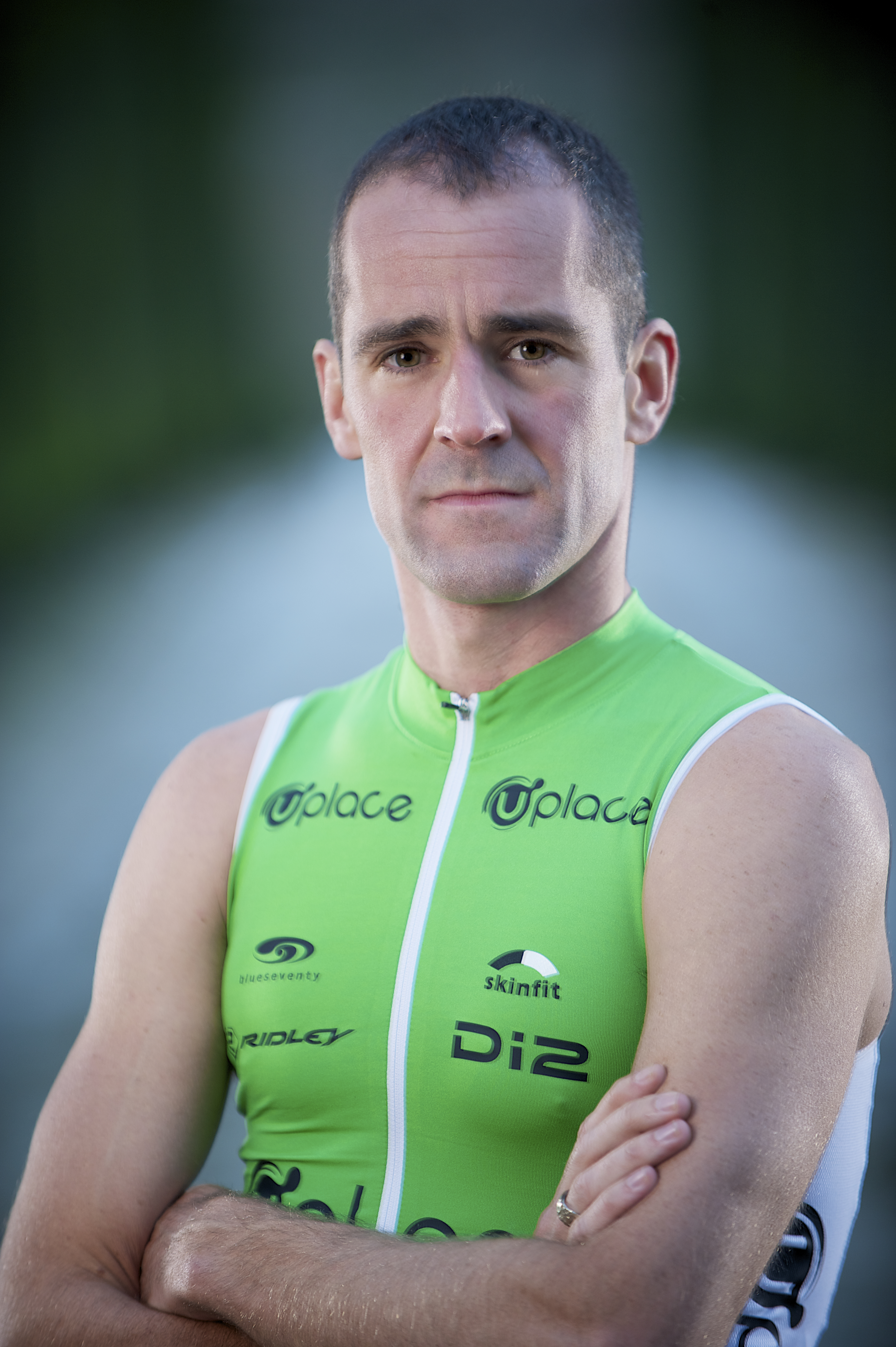

Personal information
- Nickname: Bruce
- Born: 6 October 1976 (age 49) Kapelle o/d Bos, Belgium

Sport
- Country: Belgium
- Team: Uplace Pro Triathlon Team
- Turned pro: March 2008
- Coached by: Bart Decru

Bruno Clerbout (born 6 October 1976) is a Belgian professional triathlete who competed for the Uplace Pro Triathlon Team. Clerbout, born in Kapelle o/d Bos (Belgium), became a professional triathlete in 2008. His most remarkable results include a victory in the 2017 Ironman Vichy and a fourth place in the France Ironman and the Embrunman. In 2009, Clerbout won the Kapelle-op-den-Bos quarter triathlon. That same year, he crossed the Hawaii Ironman finish line, his first time competing in the race, as the second Belgian in 24th position.

Bart Decru serves as Bruno's coach. Bruno is a member of the Iron Team Mechelen.

== Results ==
Year	Race	Result	Time
2003	Ironman Germany	52nd overall	9:28.56
2004	Ironman Austria	18th overall	8:51.28
2005	Ironman 70.3 Monaco	2nd age-grouper	
2005	1/4 Viersel	2nd	
2006	Ironman 70.3 Monaco	2nd age-grouper	
2006	Ironman 70.3 Eupen	1st	
2007	1/4 Geel	3rd	
2007	1/4 Antoing	3rd	
2007	1/2 SP Leuven	3rd	
2007	Ironman France	4th	8:46.30
2008	1/4 Metz	1st	
2008	1/4 triatlon Kapelle-op-den-Bos	2nd	
2008	Ironman France	17th	9:22.52
2009	1/4 triatlon Kapelle-op-den-Bos	1st	
2009	Ironman 70.3 Monaco	9th	4:25.48
2009	Ironman France	6th	8:58.02
2009	Ironman Hawaï	24th	8:55.11
2010	Ironman France	4th	8:53:15
2017	Ironman Vichy	1st	8:42:29
