= Kelly Williamson =

American triathlete (born 1977)

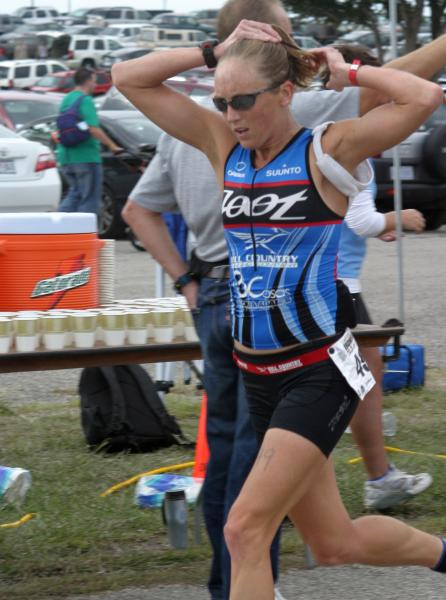
- Racing at Ironman Austin 70.3 in 2009

Personal information
- Born: December 5, 1977 (age 48) Zionsville, Indiana

Sport
- Country: United States
- Sport: Triathlon
Medal record
Representing United States
Women's triathlon
Ironman 70.3
Silver medal – second place	2012	Individual

Kelly Williamson (née Handel, born December 5, 1977) is an American triathlete who races in non-drafting, long-course events. In 2012, she took 2nd place at the Ironman 70.3 World Championship.

== Athletic career ==
Williamson was raised in Zionsville, Indiana, before moving to Illinois to attend college at the University of Illinois at Urbana–Champaign. She attended on a swimming scholarship and served as the swim team captain for two years while studying kinesiology. As a swimmer she focused on the 1650 and 500 free, the 200 fly, and the 400 IM.

In 2002, following college, Williamson was invited to the United States Olympic Training Center (OTC) in Colorado Springs by USA Triathlon after being identified as potential elite young talent at Olympic distance triathlon racing. She had experienced some early success in triathlon after college swimming, where she used triathlon as a new way to stay active and satisfy her enjoyment of athletic training. At the OTC she trained for two years while competing on the International Triathlon Union (ITU) racing circuit. During this time she won the 2002 Pan American ITU Regional Championships and was named the 2002 Elite Rookie Triathlete of the Year.

In 2005, Williamson began coaching after suffering an injury in a bike crash that kept her out of competition for most of 2005. This down time allowed her to evaluate her triathlon career and to pursue non-drafting triathlon racing after she found that she wasn't enjoying the ITU racing style despite her initial success in 2002. Williamson moved to Austin, Texas, with her husband and began racing Ironman and half-Ironman distances, and saw her results steadily improve each year. In 2012, Williamson by her own admission was having the best season of her professional career and had a 2nd-place finish at the 2012 Ironman 70.3 World Championship where she had the fastest run time of the day. However, she finished a "disappointing" 15th place a month later at the 2012 Ironman World Championship, her third appearance at the championship event. In May 2014, Williamson won her first Ironman distance race at Ironman Texas, posting the only sub-3 hour marathon by a female in the race.

== Notable results ==
Williamson's notable achievements include:

- 2017 Ironman Boulder - 4th
- 2016 ITU Long Distance Triathlon World Championships - 6th
- 2016 Ironman Texas - 4th
- 2015 Ironman 70.3 Racine - 4th
- 2015 Ironman 70.3 Buffalo Springs - 3rd
- 2015 Ironman Texas - 4th
- 2015 Ironman 70.3 Texas - 4th
- 2014 Ironman Cozumel - 3rd
- 2014 Ironman Coeur d’Alene - 2nd
- 2014 Ironman Texas - 1st
- 2013 Ironman 70.3 World Championship - 9th
- 2013 Hy-Vee Triathlon - 6th
- 2013 3M Half Marathon Mich - 1st
- 2013 Lifetime Fitness Cap Tex Tri - 2nd
- 2013 Ironman 70.3 Texas - 2nd
- 2013 Ironman 70.3 Panama - 3rd
- 2012 Ironman 70.3 World Championship - 2nd
- 2012 Hy-Vee Triathlon - 6th
- 2012 Ironman 70.3 Texas - 1st
- 2012 Ironman 70.3 San Juan - 1st
- 2012 Ironman 70.3 Panama - 2nd
- 2011 Ironman 70.3 San Juan - 1st
- 2011 Ironman 70.3 Buffalo Springs - 1st
- 2010 Ironman 70.3 Branson - 1st
- 2010 Ironman 70.3 Steelhead - 1st
- 2011 Ironman Texas - 2nd
- 2010 Ironman Coeur d’Alene - 3rd
- 2009 Ironman 70.3 Augusta - 2nd
- 2009 Ironman 70.3 Buffalo Springs - 2nd
- 2002 ITU Pan American Region Championships - 1st
