= Daniel Fontana =

Argentine-Italian triathlete

Personal information
- Full name: Daniel Monzoro Fontana
- Born: 31 December 1975 (age 50) General Roca, Río Negro, Argentina
- Height: 1.81 m (5 ft 11 in)
- Weight: 70 kg (154 lb)

Sport
- Country: Argentina; Italy
- Team: Dimensione Dello Sport (DDS)
- Coached by: Simone Diamantini
Medal record
Men's triathlon
Representing Italy
Ironman 70.3 World Championship
Gold medal – first place	2011 Pucón	Elite
Gold medal – first place	2011 Pescara	Elite
Gold medal – first place	2012 Pescara	Elite
Silver medal – second place	2009 Clearwater	Elite
Silver medal – second place	2010 Pucón	Elite
Silver medal – second place	2012 Cozumel	Elite

Daniel Monzoro Fontana (born December 31, 1975, in General Roca, Río Negro) is an Argentine-born Italian professional triathlete. Fontana started out as a swimmer in Argentina, until he began his triathlon career in 1994, while racing for his homeland. He first competed at two Pan-American Games (1999 and 2003), and at the 2004 Summer Olympics in Athens, as part of the Argentina team, where he placed twenty-eighth in the men's triathlon, with a time of 1:57:14. In 2006, Fontana relocated to Italy, and became a naturalized citizen to take his athletic abilities to a higher level.

At the peak of his career, Fontana has won seven titles in triathlon, four for Argentina and the other three for Italy. He had also achieved three top fifteen placements at the World Olympic Distance, including his eighth-place finish in 2005, which considered highest by an Italian male. Fontana also qualified for the 2008 Summer Olympics in Beijing, and competed for the Italian team in men's triathlon. He finished only in thirty-third place, with a time of 1:52:39.

Following his second Olympic participation, Fontana opted to run for the long-distance triathlon, and competed at the 2009 Ironman 70.3 World Championship in Clearwater, Florida, United States, where he finished second behind Germany's Michael Raelert with a time of 1:12:00. He was also able to beat New Zealand-born U.S. triathlete Matt Reed, who finished behind him at the Olympics, during the race. Fontana also obtained his third-place finish at the Ironman series in South Africa with the time of 8:18:51, and two championship titles at the 2011 Ironman 70.3 World Series in Pucón, Chile and in Pescara, Italy.

In 2012, Fontana performed well with a second-place finishes at the TriStar Cannes tournament, and at the 2012 Ironman 70.3 World Series, although he had suffered some physical injuries during the race.

On March 30, 2014, Daniel was first on the podium at the Ironman Los Cabos with 8:26:15, being the first Italian winning a race in the Ironman Championship.

Fontana is currently a member of an Italian professional triathlon team, Dimensione Dello Sport (DDS), coached by Simone Diamantini. He resides in Settimo Milanese, Italy.
