= Clayton Fettell =

Australian triathlete (born 1986)

Personal information
- Full name: Clayton James Fettell
- Nickname: Clayto
- Born: 29 May 1986 (age 40) Wollongong, New South Wales, Australia
- Height: 1.86 m (6 ft 1 in)
- Weight: 77 kg (170 lb)
- Spouse: Kendall Fettell (2015 – present)
- Website: www.claytonfettell.com.au

Sport
- Country: Australia
- Sport: Triathlon
- Turned pro: 2004
- Coached by: Cameron Brown

Clayton James Fettell (born 29 May 1986 in Wollongong, New South Wales) is an Australian professional triathlete who races primarily in long distance triathlon events.

== Career ==
Clayton Fettell was born in Wollongong, New South Wales, son to Greg and Kelly Fettell. Clayton is from a family of six with three other siblings (Kurtis, Paige and Mason). Clayton and his family moved to Alstonville NSW when Clayton was seven after his parents successfully got the lease on The Alstonville swimming pool. Clayton spent his upbringing competing in all different sports, water polo, swimming, triathlon, soccer, surf life saving, running and cycling with national success in water polo. When Clayton was eighteen he suffered multiple retinal detachments preventing him from further playing contact sport, ruling out a career in water polo. Clayton won his first Australian u/23 triathlon title in 2008 and has since gone on to win 70.3 races around the world. With two podiums in the Ironman distance, Clayton is now striving for an Ironman podium and Kona success.

== Personal life ==
Fettell currently lives in East Ballina, New South Wales and is married to Kendall Fettell.
