= Timothy Reed =

Australian triathlete

Personal information
- Nationality: Australian
- Born: 1985 (age 40–41)

Sport
- Sport: Triathlon
Medal record
Men's triathlon
Representing Australia
Ironman 70.3 World Championship
Gold medal – first place	2016 Mooloolaba	Individual

Timothy Reed (born 1985) is an Australian triathlete. He won a gold medal at the 2016 Ironman 70.3 World Championship, after defeating Sebastian Kienle with two seconds in a close finish. Swam with Anna Wilcox at SFS pool.
