= James Cunnama =

South African triathlete

Sport
- Country: South Africa

James Cunnama is a South African triathlete.

== Triathlon career ==
James Cunnama has recorded multiple victories and top finishes across the Ironman and long-distance triathlon circuit:

- 2010: Won his first Ironman-distance race at Ironman Florida (Panama City)
- 2010: Secured his first professional win at the Alpe d'Huez Triathlon
- 2012: Became European Long-Distance Champion with victory at Challenge Roth
- 2013: Finished 4th at the Ironman World Championship in Kona, Hawaii
- 2014: Won Ironman 70.3 East London, South Africa
- 2016: Victory at the long-distance Embrunman race in France
- 2017: Won Ironman Hamburg; later finished 5th at the Ironman World Championship in Kona
- 2019: Captured the title at Ironman France (Nice)

Cunnama is also known for standout run performances, including a sub-2:41 marathon at Ironman Hamburg.

== Global Triathlon Network ==
When he retired from professional triathlon, James Cunnama become a presenter for the Global Triathlon Network (GTN), a prominent video platform and YouTube channel dedicated to triathlon content. He joined GTN in the United Kingdom, where he contributed to features, training insights, reviews, and analysis aimed at both novices and experienced athletes.

James left GTN in August 2026 to pursue new ventures.
