= Rasmus Henning =

Danish triathlete

Personal information
- Born: 13 November 1975 (age 50) Copenhagen, Denmark
- Height: 6 ft 2 in (1.88 m)
- Weight: 163 lb (74 kg)

Sport
- Turned pro: 1998
Medal record
Men's Triathlon
Representing Denmark
ITU Long Distance World Championships
Silver medal – second place	2001 Fredericia	Elite

Rasmus Henning (born 13 November 1975, in Copenhagen) is an athlete from Denmark, who competes in triathlon. He competed at the second Olympic triathlon at the 2004 Summer Olympics in which he placed seventh with a total time of 1:52:37.32. He competed in the 2008 Summer Olympics as well, placing eighth in the triathlon competition with a time of 1:49:57.47. In International Triathlon Union competition, he recorded a second-place finish at the 2001 ITU Long Distance Triathlon World Championships.

Henning retired from triathlon as a professional in 2012 following the 2012 Ironman World Championship. In his reasons for retiring, Henning cited the desire to retire on his own terms, particularly as injuries began to mount and as he tried to strike a balance between sport and family. He continues to participate in endurance sports and runs a company called Tri Nordic.
