= Kate Bevilaqua =

Australian triathlete

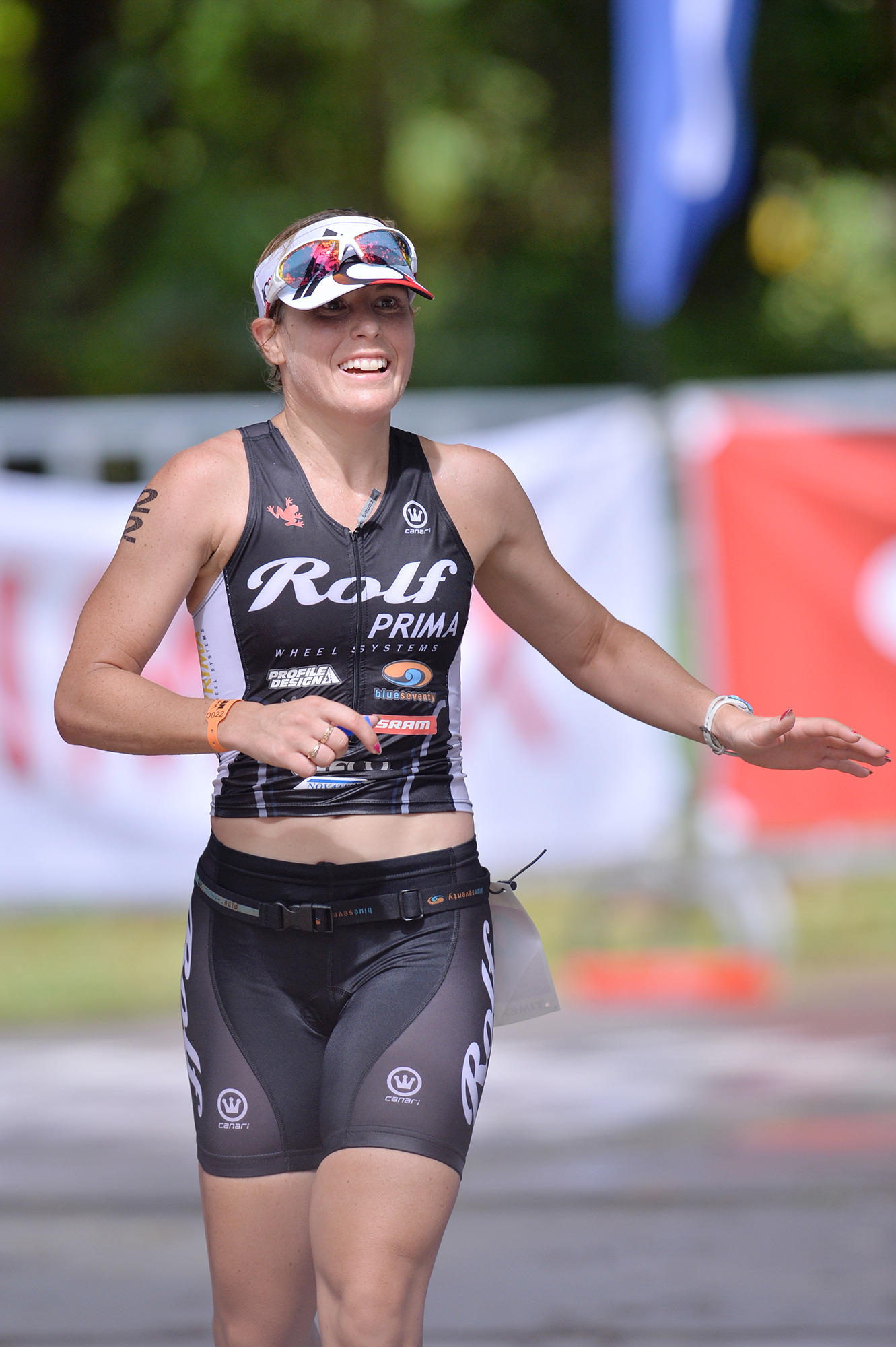

Kate Bevilaqua (born 4 August 1977) is an Australian triathlete and the winner of the women's 2010 Ironman Western Australia Triathlon.
