= Pedro Gomes (triathlete) =

Portuguese triathlete

Pedro Ribeiro Silva Gomes (born 6 December 1983, Lisbon, Portugal), is a Portuguese professional triathlete. He finished second at Ironman Florida in 2010 on his first official Ironman World Circuit professional race, setting a national record at the time with a time of 8:19:26.

Early in his career, Pedro was included in the London 2012 Olympic hopefuls program after his top 10 result at Eilat ITU Premium European Cup and 11th place at Baeza ITU European Cup & Iberoamerican Championship. Pedro went on to live for three years at the National Training Center in Lisbon, Portugal with focus on obtaining qualification for London 2012 Olympic Games. After an unsuccessful qualification process, Pedro switched to long distance triathlon.

In long distance international competition, he placed 5th at the European ITU Long Course Championship in Vitoria-Gasteiz and 12th at the ITU World Championship in Immenstadt in 2010. When switching focus to the 140.6 distance, he also placed 6th in a time of 8:25:53 at Challenge Barcelona that same year.

In 2013, Pedro became the first Portuguese - male or female - to ever win an official Ironman event as a professional athlete with his win at Ironman Kalmar 2013 in a time of 8:19:30. Over the course of his career he has finished on the podium of a professional Ironman event another 6 times with podiums at Ironman Canada, Austria, Florida, Wisconsin, Arizona and more recently at Ironman Coeur d'Alene 2021.

== Results ==
Some result highlights include:

- Ironman Kalmar 2013 – 8:19:30 – 1st
- Challenge Vitoria-Gasteiz 2013 – 8:38:20 – 1st
- Ironman Florida 2010 – 8:19:26 – 2nd
- Ironman Canada 2016 – 8:27:31 – 2nd
- Ironman Coeur d'Alene 2021 – 8:17:50 – 3rd
- Ironman Austria 2012 – 8:26:31 – 3rd
- Ironman Wisconsin 2014 – 8:36:56 – 3rd
- Rev3 Cedar Point 2011 – 8:46:14 – 4th
- Ironman North American Championship 2015 – 08:26:42 – 5th
- Ironman Arizona 2013 – 08:11:40 – 5th
- Ironman Florida 2013 – 08:08:34 – 5th
- Challenge Barcelona 2010 – 8:25:52 – 6th
- Ironman Florida 2020 - 8:13:XX - 7th
- Ironman New York 2012 – 8:38:XX – 8th
- Ironman Frankfurt 2013 – 8:22:28 – 12th
