= Mary Beth Ellis =

American triathlete (born 1977)

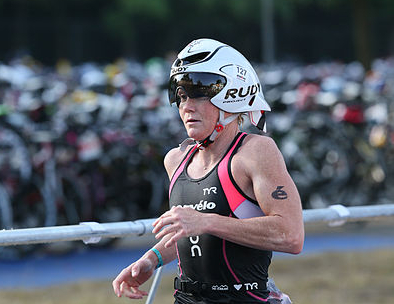
- Ellis in transition at 2014 Ironman Germany

Personal information
- Nickname: MB
- Born: July 12, 1977 (age 48) Washington, D.C.
- Height: 5 ft 4 in (1.63 m)
- Weight: 117 lb (53 kg)

Sport
- Country: United States
- Sport: Triathlon
- Turned pro: 2006
- Retired: 2016
Medal record
Representing United States
Women's triathlon
ITU Long Distance World Championships
Gold medal – first place	2015	Individual
Ironman 70.3
Silver medal – second place	2009	Individual
Silver medal – second place	2008	Individual

Mary Beth Ellis (born July 12, 1977) is a retired American long-distance triathlete. She holds the record for the fastest iron-distance race by an American woman, set at Ironman Austria in 2011 with a time of 8:43:34. She is the 2015 ITU Long Distance Triathlon champion and has taken second place at both the 2008 and 2009 Ironman 70.3 World Championship. She has been named USA Triathlon's Non-Olympic/ITU Female Athlete of the Year for both 2011 and 2012.

== Athletic career ==
Ellis was born in Washington, D.C., and raised in Rehoboth Beach and Lewes, Delaware by Stephen and Kathleen Ellis. She attended Lawrenceville School where she competed in swimming, golf, lacrosse, field hockey, and track and field. Ellis went on to college at Northwestern University to major in industrial engineering and then obtain a master's degree in marketing. While at Northwestern she competed on the school's cross country team and was a four-year letter-winner and NCAA qualifier for the NU swimming team.

Following college, Ellis moved to Colorado where she participated in half-marathon and marathon races while working full-time. In 2005, she was diagnosed with osteoarthritis due to her high volume of run training. She moved on to compete in triathlon to reduce some of the stress put on her body. She experienced enough success within her first year of short course racing that she was able to turn pro and quit her full-time job. Under coach Siri Lindley, Ellis experienced some success in her first year of ITU racing in 2006. Following the set back of injuries experienced in 2007, Ellis focused on qualifying for the 2008 Summer Olympics in triathlon, but she fell short and failed to qualify. It became apparent that Ellis was more suited for longer distance triathlon events versus shorter, Olympic style racing.

Ellis started competing in Ironman 70.3 events that same year after Olympic qualifying had finished, and experienced immediate success winning her first 70.3 race at the Lake Stevens event. She would finish 2nd that year at the Ironman 70.3 World Championships, and then follow that up with a repeat 2nd-place finish at the 2009 Championship event. The following year, in 2010, Ellis by her own admission was racing poorly due in part to over training. During the off season she hired Brett Sutton as her coach and joined teamTBB. That next year in Ironman Triathlon racing, Ellis won Ironman Austria with the third fastest Ironman time by a woman ever. In 2012, Ellis experienced more success winning Ironman Texas, the U.S. Championships at Ironman New York, and Ironman Cozumel.

In 2013, Ellis continued to have more success by winning Ironman 70.3 Florida, defending her title at the Alpe d'Huez Triathlon, and claiming first place at both the Ironman France and Ironman Mont Tremblant races; which continued her steak of remaining unbeaten at Ironman races outside of the Ironman World Championships. On September 9, 2013, while training for the upcoming Ironman World Championship in October, Ellis broke her collarbone in a bike accident in Cozumel, Mexico. After the injury, she initially felt that she wouldn't be ready to compete in the 2013 Ironman, but that changed after undergoing surgery. Ellis' condensed a four to six-month recovery plan into one month with the goal of competing in the October 12th race in Kona, Hawaii. She used the crash experience to raise money for the Steadman Philippon Research Institute, the nation's largest and oldest non-profit for sports injury research. In Kona, Ellis came into T2 in 15th place after the bike, but was unable to finish and compete in the remainder of the race.

Following the crash Ellis changed her perspective towards racing and as a result changed coaches, opting to again work with Lindley. For her 2014 season Ellis decided to take on a "triple-crown" of non-drafting championship races; the 5150 Championships, the Ironman 70.3 World Championship, and the Ironman World Championship However, these races, as well as others for the next 18 months did not produce the finishes she was hoping for. Despite her praise of Lindley as a coach Ellis recognized that her time left as elite athlete was limited. Therefore, she re-enlisted Sutton as her coach in May 2015 hoping to reproduce the same successful race results she did under his previous guidance. In an indication that her training and racing under Sutton was progressing in the right direction Ellis won the ITU Long Distance Triathlon Championships in late June, leading the race from start to finish.

In October 2016, prior to competing at the 2016 Ironman World Championship, Ellis announced this race would be her last as she would retire from the sport of triathlon as a competitor. She expressed a strong desire to give back to the sport and entering into coaching alongside Sutton. In her final race Ellis placed 14th.

== Notable results ==
Ellis' notable achievements include:

Results list

Year	Position	Event
2016	14th	Ironman World Championship
2016	1st	Ironman Maastricht-Limburg
2015	1st	Ironman Mont-Tremblant
2015	2nd	Ironman Switzerland
2015	1st	ITU Long Distance World Championships
2015	2nd	Challenge Denmark
2015	3rd	Challenge Batemans Bay
2015	7th	Ironman 70.3 St. George
2014	12th	Challenge Bahrain
2014	9th	Ironman World Championship
2014	5th	Ironman 70.3 Championship
2014	9th	Hy-Vee Triathlon
2014	8th	Ironman Germany
2014	4th	Ironman 70.3 St. George
2014	2nd	Ironman Asia-Pacific Championship Melbourne
2014	7th	Ironman 70.3 Latin American Championship Panama
2013	1st	Alpe d'Huez Triathlon
2013	1st	Ironman North American Championship Mont Tremblant
2013	1st	Ironman France
2013	1st	Ironman 70.3 Florida
2012	1st	Ironman Cozumel
2012	5th	Ironman World Championship
2012	1st	Ironman 70.3 France
2012	1st	Ironman New York
2012	1st	Alpe d'Huez Triathlon
2012	1st	Ironman 70.3 Norway
2012	1st	Ironman Texas
2012	1st	Ironman 70.3 Singapore
2011	1st	Ironman Canada
2011	1st	Ironman Regensburg
2011	1st	Ironman Austria - 1st
2011	1st	Ironman 70.3 Singapore
2009	1st	Pan Am Championships
2009	1st	Escape From Alcatraz
2009	2nd	Ironman 70.3 World Championship
2008	2nd	Ironman 70.3 World Championship
2008	1st	Ironman 70.3 Lake Stevens

== Personal ==
Ellis resides in Boulder, Colorado with her spouse Eric Olson.
