= 2011 Ironman 70.3 World Championship =

The 2011 Ironman 70.3 World Championship was a triathlon competition that was held at Lake Las Vegas in Henderson, Nevada on September 11, 2011. It was sponsored by the United States Marine Corps and organized by the World Triathlon Corporation. The championship race was the culmination of the Ironman 70.3 series of events that occurred from October 1, 2010 to August 15, 2011. Athletes, both professional and amateur, earned a spot in the championship race by qualifying in races throughout the 70.3 series. The 2011 Championship marked the first year that the race was not held in Clearwater, Florida, which had hosted the race since its inception in 2006.

== Medallists ==
=== Men ===
Pos.	Time (h:mm:ss)	Name	Country	Split times (h:mm:ss)				
Pos.	Time (h:mm:ss)	Name	Country	Swim	T1	Bike	T2	Run
Gold medal	3:54:48	Craig Alexander	Australia	24:45	2:34	2:14:47	0:53	1:11:51
Silver medal	3:58:03	Chris Lieto	United States	24:51	2:31	2:10:36	1:11	1:18:56
Bronze medal	3:58:42	Jeff Symonds	Canada	24:47	2:27	2:16:55	1:01	1:13:33
4	3:59:11	Michael Weiss	Austria	27:57	2:51	2:12:58	1:17	1:14:10
5	4:00:00	Joe Gambles	Australia	24:45	2:30	2:15:09	0:48	1:16:50
6	4:00:26	Paul Matthews	Australia	24:27	2:12	2:15:45	0:52	1:17:13
7	4:00:53	Raynard Tissink	South Africa	24:57	2:28	2:17:32	1:08	1:14:51
8	4:02:01	Tim Berkel	Australia	26:33	2:37	2:14:44	1:05	1:17:04
9	4:04:03	Luke Bell	United States	24:53	2:24	2:15:15	1:14	1:20:19
10	4:05:09	Alessandro Degasperi	Italy	25:23	2:19	2:16:29	1:00	1:19:59

=== Women ===
Pos.	Time (h:mm:ss)	Name	Country	Split times (h:mm:ss)				
Pos.	Time (h:mm:ss)	Name	Country	Swim	T1	Bike	T2	Run
Gold medal	4:20:55	Melissa Rollison	Australia	28:27	2:29	2:27:58	0:49	1:21:14
Silver medal	4:26:52	Karin Thürig	Switzerland	33:01	3:11	2:24:05	1:22	1:25:15
Bronze medal	4:29:25	Linsey Corbin	United States	29:19	2:38	2:31:08	0:58	1:25:24
4	4:30:21	Heather Jackson	United States	29:31	2:27	2:33:06	0:50	1:24:27
5	4:33:08	Joanna Lawn	New Zealand	27:59	2:50	2:33:52	1:07	1:27:22
6	4:33:57	Leanda Cave	United States	25:40	2:30	2:36:29	0:58	1:28:22
7	4:35:36	Heather Wurtele	Canada	27:28	2:45	2:33:47	1:11	1:30:26
8	4:36:14	Emma-Kate Lidbury	Great Britain	26:29	2:37	2:38:57	1:12	1:27:01
9	4:36:52	Christie Sym	Australia	29:17	2:33	2:32:19	0:56	1:31:48
10	4:37:03	Michelle Wu	Australia	28:04	2:50	2:38:15	1:01	1:26:56

== Qualification ==
The 2011 Ironman 70.3 Series featured 38 events that enabled qualification to the 2011 World Championship event. Professional triathletes qualified for the championship race by competing in races during the qualifying year, earning points towards their pro rankings. An athlete’s five highest scoring races are counted toward their pro rankings. The top 50 males and top 30 females in the pro rankings qualified for the championship race.

Amateur triathletes could also qualify for the championship race by earning a qualifying slot at one of the qualifying events or through the Physically Challenged Lottery. Slots were allocated to each age group category, male and female, with the number of slots given out based on that category's proportional representation of the overall field. Each age group category was assured one qualifying spot at each qualifying event. Some 70.3 events also serve as qualifiers for the full Ironman World Championships in Hawaii.

While the 70.3 Series continued its gradual expansion in 2011, with the number of qualifying races the overall number of qualifiers remained the same from the previous year. This was due to the Championship event being moved up from its previous November slot on the calendar to September causing many of the new and previously established events to instead act as qualifiers for the 2012 Championship race. Those new events added as part of the 2011 series include races in Busselton, Western Australia; Port Macquarie, New South Wales; Pescara, Italy; Mallorca, Spain; San Juan, Puerto Rico; Miami; Jeju, South Korea; and Muncie, Indiana as well as the Asia-Pacific Championship in Phuket.

=== Qualifying Ironman 70.3s ===
Date	Event	Location
Oct 17, 2010	Ironman 70.3 Austin	Austin, Texas, United States
Oct 30, 2010	Ironman Miami 70.3	Miami, Florida, United States
Nov 13, 2010	Foster Grant Ironman 70.3 World Championship	Clearwater, Florida, United States
Dec 5, 2010	Asia-Pacific Championship 70.3	Phuket, Thailand
Jan 16, 2011	Ironman 70.3 Pucón	Pucón, Chile
Jan 23, 2011	Spec-Savers Ironman 70.3 South Africa	Buffalo City, South Africa
Mar 19, 2011	Ironman 70.3 San Juan	San Juan, Puerto Rico
Mar 20, 2011	Aviva Ironman 70.3 Singapore	Singapore
Apr 2, 2011	Ironman 70.3 California^{†}	Oceanside, California, United States
Apr 10, 2011	Memorial Hermann Ironman 70.3 Texas	Galveston Island, Texas, United States
Apr 17, 2011	Ochsner Ironman 70.3 New Orleans	New Orleans, Louisiana, United States
May 1, 2011	Ironman 70.3 Port Macquarie	(Australia) Port Macquarie, New South Wales
May 1, 2011	St. Croix Ironman 70.3^{†}	St. Croix, US Virgin Islands, United States
May 7, 2011	Ironman 70.3 Busselton	Busselton, Western Australia
May 14, 2011	Thomas Cook Ironman 70.3 Mallorca	Alcudia, Mallorca, Spain
May 15, 2011	Rohto Ironman 70.3 Florida	Orlando, Florida, United States
May 22, 2011	Ironman 70.3 Austria	St. Pölten/Vienna, Austria
Jun 4, 2011	Rohto Ironman 70.3 Hawaii^{†}	Kohala, Hawaii, United States
Jun 5, 2011	PowerBar Ironman 70.3 Switzerland	Rapperswil-Jona, Lake Zurich, Switzerland
Jun 5, 2011	Ironman 70.3 Mooseman	Newfound Lake, New Hampshire, United States
Jun 11, 2011	Ironman 70.3 Boise	Boise, Idaho, United States
Jun 12, 2011	Ironman 70.3 Italy	Pescara, Italy
Jun 12, 2011	Eagleman Ironman 70.3^{†}	Cambridge, Maryland, United States
Jun 12, 2011	Ironman 70.3 Kansas	Lawrence, Kansas, United States
Jun 19, 2011	Ironman 70.3 U.K.	(United Kingdom) Wimbleball, Exmoor, UK
Jun 26, 2011	Ironman 70.3 Buffalo Springs Lake^{†∗}	Lubbock, Texas, United States
Jul 3, 2011	Ironman 70.3 Korea	Jeju, South Korea
Jul 9, 2011	Ironman 70.3 Muncie	Muncie, Indiana, United States
Jul 10, 2011	Amica Ironman 70.3 Rhode Island	Providence, Rhode Island, United States
Jul 17, 2011	Ironman 70.3 Racine	Racine, Wisconsin, United States
Jul 17, 2011	Vineman Ironman 70.3	Sonoma County, California, United States
Jul 24, 2011	Antwerp Ironman 70.3^{‡}	Antwerp, Belgium
Jul 31, 2011	Viterra Ironman 70.3 Calgary	Calgary, Alberta, Canada
Aug 7, 2011	Rohto Ironman 70.3 Boulder	Boulder, Colorado, United States
Aug 14, 2011	Cobra Ironman 70.3 Philippines	Camarines Sur, Philippines
Aug 14, 2011	Ironman 70.3 European Championship	Wiesbaden/Rheingau-Taunus-Kreis, Germany
Aug 14, 2011	Whirlpool Ironman 70.3 Steelhead	Benton Harbor, Michigan, United States
Aug 14, 2011	Ironman 70.3 Lake Stevens	Lake Stevens, WA, United States

^{†}Also serves as a 2011 Ironman World Championship qualifier.
^{‡}Also serves as a 2011 Ironman World Championship qualifier, handcycle entry only.
^{∗}Ironman 70.3 U.S. Handcycle Championship

==== China cancellation ====
On May 12, 2011, the WTC announced that the 2011 Ironman China and Ironman 70.3 China races, scheduled for May 29 in Jixian, Tianjin Province, China, were canceled. The Tianjin Sports Bureau (TSB) was unable to obtain the required sanctions from the China Triathlon Sports Association (CTSA) to conduct the event. Murphy Reinschreiber, managing director of the Asia Pacific region for WTC stated that "TSB simply failed to provide all of the documentation necessary for CTSA to process the sanction." WTC is offering a full refund of entry fees to all athletes who were scheduled to compete at Ironman China and Ironman 70.3 China. Additionally, all athletes were offered a complimentary race entry into any of the 2011 Ironman and Ironman 70.3 races. WTC is allocating the age group qualifying slots from Ironman China and Ironman 70.3 China to other races in the region to ensure that athletes from the Asia-Pacific region are represented at the 2011 World Championship events.

=== 2011 Ironman 70.3 Series results ===
==== Men ====
Event	Gold	Time	Silver	Time	Bronze	Time	Reference
Austin	James Cunnama (RSA)	3:53:57	Marko Albert (EST)	3:55:06	Richie Cunningham (AUS)	3:57:04	
Miami	Sylvain Sudrie (FRA)	4:00:41	Paul Amey (GBR)	4:02:47	Oscar Galíndez (ARG)	4:05:38	
Clearwater	Michael Raelert (GER)	3:41:19	Filip Ospalý (CZE)	3:42:56	Timothy O'Donnell (USA)	3:44:18	
Phuket	Timothy O'Donnell (USA)	3:59:42	Massimo Cigana (ITA)	4:01:52	Hideo Fukui (JPN)	4:04:00	
Pucón	Daniel Fontana (ITA)	3:52:59	Reinaldo Colucci (BRA)	3:56:24	Oscar Galíndez (ARG)	3:57:17	
South Africa	Frederik Van Lierde (BEL)	4:06:30	James Cunnama (RSA)	4:08:41	Alessandro Degasperi (ITA)	4:15:16	
San Juan	Timothy O'Donnell (USA)	3:49:29	Paul Amey (GBR)	3:52:37	Luke McKenzie (AUS)	3:56:57	
Singapore	Kris Gemmell (NZL)	3:50:56	James Cunnama (RSA)	3:50:55	Pete Jacobs (AUS)	3:54:25	
California	Andy Potts (USA)	3:55:49	Rasmus Henning (DEN)	3:56:07	Michael Weiss (AUT)	3:56:29	
Texas	Chris Lieto (USA)	3:45:37	Rasmus Henning (DEN)	3:46:47	Timothy O'Donnell (USA)	3:48:16	
New Orleans^{∗}	Sebastian Kienle (GER)	3:18:08	Paul Amey (GBR)	3:23:08	Paul Matthews (AUS)	3:25:24	
Port Macquarie	Joe Gambles (AUS)	3:58:15	Tim Berkel (AUS)	4:01:40	Cameron Brown (NZL)	4:03:22	
St. Croix	Maksym Kriat (UKR)	4:11:43	Luke Bell (AUS)	4:11:59	Richie Cunningham (AUS)	4:15:50	
Busselton	Tim Berkel (AUS)	3:51:27	Matty White (AUS)	3:52:50	Tim Reed (AUS)	3:53:59	
Mallorca	Andreas Raelert (GER)	3:53:07	Bertrand Billard (FRA)	3:56:56	Sylvain Sudrie (FRA)	3:59:00	
Florida	Andy Potts (USA)	3:53:14	Maxim Kriat (UKR)	3:57:10	David Kahn (USA)	3:58:13	
Austria	Filip Ospalý (CZE)	3:55:27	Michael Weiss (AUT)	3:56:01	Paul Amey (GBR)	3:57:01	
Hawaii	Luke Bell (AUS)	3:58:14	Chris Lieto (USA)	4:01:32	Matt Lieto (USA)	4:05:25	
Switzerland	Andreas Böcherer (GER)	3:46:56	Ronnie Schildknecht (SUI)	3:51:23	Mathias Hecht (SUI)	3:54:36	
Mooseman	Maxim Kriat (UKR)	4:02:04	Paul Ambrose (AUS)	4:02:11	Tom Lowe (GBR)	4:09:23	
Boise	Ben Hoffman (USA)	3:52:41	Nicholas Thompson (USA)	3:54:48	Jeff Symonds (CAN)	3:55:28	
Italy	Daniel Fontana (ITA)	4:01:26	Alessandro Degasperi (ITA)	4:10:54	Hideo Fukui (JPN)	4:10:55	
Eagleman	T. J. Tollakson (USA)	3:54:49	Richie Cunningham (AUS)	3:57:43	Stanislav Krylov (RUS)	3:58:13	
Kansas	Paul Matthews (AUS)	3:49:44	David Kahn (USA)	3:55:46	Luke Bell (AUS)	3:56:13	
U.K.	Mikel Elgezabal (ESP)	4:25:15	Stephen Bayliss (GBR)	4:26:30	Martin Jensen (DEN)	4:27:18	
Buffalo Springs	Raynard Tissink (RSA)	4:03:27	Michael Lovato (USA)	4:04:22	Josiah Middaugh (USA)	4:05:51	
Korea	Cameron Brown (NZL)	4:03:58	Guy Crawford (NZL)	4:15:03	Kieran Doe (NZL)	4:15:56	
Muncie	Ben Hoffman (USA)	3:48:14	Mike Caiazzo (USA)	3:53:12	Rich Allen (GBR)	3:54:18	
Rhode Island	David Kahn (USA)	4:00:52	Paul Ambrose (AUS)	4:01:27	Viktor Zyemtsev (UKR)	4:21:24	
Racine	Paul Ambrose (AUS)	3:51:50	Tim Berkel (AUS)	3:57:32	Patrick Evoe (USA)	4:03:14	
Vineman	Andy Potts (USA)	3:45:58	Paul Matthews (AUS)	3:46:27	Joe Gambles (AUS)	3:47:04	
Antwerp	Bart Aernoets (BEL)	3:45:37	Axel Zeebroek (BEL)	3:48:25	Markus Fachbach (GER)	3:54:31	
Calgary	Timothy O'Donnell (USA)	3:56:24	Jordan Rapp (USA)	4:02:37	Brian Fleischmann (USA)	4:03:27	
Boulder	Joe Gambles (AUS)	3:45:35	Raynard Tissink (RSA)	3:51:41	Paul Ambrose (AUS)	3:53:01	
Philippines	Pete Jacobs (AUS)	3:51:43	Jesse Thomas (USA)	4:12:30	Cameron Brown (NZL)	4:12:54	
Wiesbaden	Andreas Böcherer (GER)	4:08:36	Filip Ospalý (CZE)	4:10:19	Martin Krňávek (CZE)	4:15:02	
Steelhead^{∗}	Tom Lowe (GBR)	3:19:32	Matt Reed (USA)	3:19:51	Michael Lovato (USA)	3:20:16	
Lake Stevens	Luke Bell (AUS)	3:56:50	Paul Ambrose (AUS)	3:57:23	Jeff Symonds (CAN)	3:58:29	

^{∗}Swim portion canceled

==== Women ====
Event	Gold	Time	Silver	Time	Bronze	Time	Reference
Austin	Nicola Spirig (SWI)	4:09:34	Angela Naeth (CAN)	4:17:58	Samantha Warriner (NZL)	4:22:01	
Miami	Leanda Cave (GBR)	4:21:21	Angela Naeth (CAN)	4:30:03	Christie Sym (AUS)	4:36:46	
Clearwater	Jodie Swallow (GBR)	4:06:28	Leanda Cave (GBR)	4:12:34	Magali Tisseyre (CAN)	4:13:04	
Phuket	Caroline Steffen (SUI)	4:20:13	Melissa Rollison (AUS)	4:24:53	Belinda Granger (AUS)	4:30:49	
Pucón	Linsey Corbin (USA)	4:15:42	Kim Loeffler (USA)	4:21:17	Heather Gollnick (USA)	4:33:38	
South Africa	Jodie Swallow (GBR)	4:39:19	Tine Deckers (BEL)	4:42:25	Mari Rabie (RSA)	4:45:45	
San Juan	Kelly Williamson (USA)	4:15:38	Kate Major (AUS)	4:19:05	Caitlin Snow (USA)	4:20:33	
Singapore	Mary Beth Ellis (USA)	4:21:06	Amy Marsh (USA)	4:22:32	Michelle Wu (AUS)	4:25:31	
California	Mirinda Carfrae (AUS)	4:26:18	Heather Jackson (USA)	4:26:28	Magali Tisseyre (CAN)	4:27:22	
Texas	Catriona Morrison (GBR)	4:06:43	Angela Naeth (CAN)	4:09:40	Karin Thürig (SUI)	4:10:30	
New Orleans^{∗}	Julie Dibens (GBR)	3:40:15	Samantha Warriner (NZL)	3:41:31	Yvonne van Vlerken (NED)	3:44:30	
Port Macquarie	Joanna Lawn (NZL)	4:29:36	Madeleine Oldfield (AUS)	4:37:24	Michelle Wu (AUS)	4:41:10	
St. Croix	Catriona Morrison (GBR)	4:29:28	Angela Naeth (CAN)	4:32:07	Mirinda Carfrae (AUS)	4:36:01	
Busselton	Joanna Lawn (NZL)	4:13:23	Felicity Sheedy Ryan (AUS)	4:15:21	Rebekah Keat (AUS)	4:15:55	
Mallorca	Emma-Kate Lidbury (GBR)	4:33:18	Erika Csomor (HUN)	4:33:50	Silvia Felt (GER)	4:34:04	
Florida	Caitlin Snow (USA)	4:22:31	Nina Kraft (GER)	4:28:37	Heather Leiggi (USA)	4:32:14	
Austria	Karin Thürig (SUI)	4:20:34	Erika Csomor (HUN)	4:24:19	Yvonne van Vlerken (NED)	4:26:56	
Hawaii	Bree Wee (USA)	4:42:32	Sheila Croft (USA)	4:43:09	Susanne Davis (USA)	4:44:00	
Switzerland	Caroline Steffen (SUI)	4:15:10	Karin Thürig (SUI)	4:18:31	Sonja Tajsich (GER)	4:24:58	
Mooseman	Lesley Paterson (GBR)	4:30:58	Caitlin Snow (USA)	4:31:46	Melanie McQuaid (CAN)	4:49:29	
Boise	Magali Tisseyre (CAN)	4:18:28	Heather Wurtele (CAN)	4:20:21	Rachel McBride (CAN)	4:22:14	
Italy	Martina Dogana (ITA)	4:44:59	Edith Niederfriniger (ITA)	4:47:51	Francesca Tibaldi (ITA)	4:54:24	
Eagleman	Mirinda Carfrae (AUS)	4:15:31	Tyler Stewart (USA)	4:21:28	Samantha Warriner (NZL)	4:23:02	
Kansas	Chrissie Wellington (GBR)	4:11:08	Leanda Cave (GBR)	4:15:13	Whitney Garcia (USA)	4:27:17	
U.K.	Emma-Kate Lidbury (GBR)	5:01:01	Eimear Mullan (IRL)	5:01:49	Lucy Gossage (GBR)	5:03:43	
Buffalo Springs	Kelly Williamson (USA)	4:26:09	Jessica Meyers (USA)	4:34:23	Margaret Shapiro (USA)	4:35:21	
Korea	Joanna Lawn (NZL)	4:38:54	Yasuko Miyazaki (JPN)	5:08:06	Sarah Wheeler (GBR)	5:24:03	
Muncie	Melissa Rollison (AUS)	4:08:48	Kelly Williamson (USA)	4:12:19	Leanda Cave (GBR)	4:12:35	
Rhode Island	Magali Tisseyre (CAN)	4:27:08	Annie Gervais (CAN)	4:38:38	Heather Leiggi (USA)	4:40:39	
Racine	Christie Sym (AUS)	4:28:54	Kristin Andrews (USA)	4:33:26	Michelle Wu (AUS)	4:33:48	
Vineman	Melissa Rollison (AUS)	4:09:00	Leanda Cave (GBR)	4:15:14	Mirinda Carfrae (AUS)	4:17:49	
Antwerp	Sofie Goos (BEL)	4:21:24	Sofie De Groote (BEL)	4:22:40	Natascha Badmann (SUI)	4:26:44	
Calgary	Tenille Hoogland (CAN)	4:34:21	Sara Gross (CAN)	4:34:27	Mackenzie Madison (USA)	4:36:52	
Boulder	Angela Naeth (CAN)	4:10:31	Kelly Williamson (USA)	4:12:42	Amanda Lovato (USA)	4:23:54	
Philippines	Belinda Granger (AUS)	4:26:23	Amanda Stevens (USA)	4:28:34	Bree Wee (USA)	4:35:16	
Wiesbaden	Karin Thürig (SUI)	4:45:47	Eva Wutti (AUT)	4:50:54	Natascha Badmann (SUI)	4:51:39	
Steelhead^{∗}	Melissa Rollison (AUS)	3:36:02	Heather Jackson (USA)	3:39:38	Jessica Jacobs (USA)	3:44:22	
Lake Stevens	Tyler Stewart (USA)	4:27:31	Melanie McQuaid (CAN)	4:37:58	Haley Cooper-Scott (USA)	4:42:42	

^{∗}Swim portion canceled
