= 2018 ITU Long Distance Triathlon World Championships =

International sports competition

World Long Distance Triathlon Championships
- Location: Fyn, Denmark
- Date: July 14, 2018

Champions
- Men: Pablo Dapena Gonzalez (ESP)
- Women: Helle Frederiksen (DEN)

The 2018 ITU Long Distance Triathlon World Championships was a triathlon competition held in Fyn in Denmark on July 14, 2018 and organized by the International Triathlon Union, now World Triathlon. The Elite races for men and consisted of a 3 km (1.9 mi) swim, 120 km (75 mi) bike and 30 km (19 mi) run, longer than the standard 1.5 km swim, 40 km bike and 10 km run associated with the World Triathlon Championship Series and the Olympic Games, but shorter than the classic Ironman Triathlon event.

== Medal Summary ==
Event	Gold		Silver		Bronze	
Men	Pablo Dapena Gonzalez; Spain	5:19:30	Ruedi Wild; Switzerland	5:22:13	Marko Albert; Estonia	5:22:27
Women	Helle Frederiksen; Denmark	5:49:04	Barbara Riveros; Chile	5:51:22	Annabel Luxford; Australia	5:55:47

== Results ==
The following are the results of the elite races:

=== Men ===
Rank	Athlete	Swim	T1	Bike	T2	Run	Overall time
1st place, gold medalist(s)	Pablo Dapena Gonzalez (ESP)	36:56	1:45	2:51:19	1:51	1:47:39	5:19:30
2nd place, silver medalist(s)	Ruedi Wild (SUI)	37:27	1:45	2:50:12	1:56	1:50:53	5:22:13
3rd place, bronze medalist(s)	Marko Albert (EST)	36:54	1:32	2:51:34	1:54	1:50:33	5:22:27
4	Kévin Maurel (FRA)	39:01	1:42	2:49:19	1:49	1:53:33	5:25:24
5	Giulio Molinari (ITA)	38:58	1:57	2:49:06	1:51	1:54:18	5:26:10
6	Mathias Lyngsø Petersen (DEN)	37:21	1:55	2:50:41	2:27	1:56:55	5:29:19
7	Kristian Høgenhaug (DEN)	40:48	2:02	2:52:10	1:54	1:52:44	5:29:38
8	Viktor Zemtsev (UKR)	40:17	1:44	2:56:50	1:56	1:51:05	5:31:52
9	Cyril Viennot (FRA)	38:58	1:59	2:54:06	1:44	1:55:21	5:32:08
10	Anders Christensen (DEN)	40:48	1:53	2:52:18	2:03	1:55:09	5:32:11
11	Morten Brammer Olesen (DEN)	40:47	1:52	2:56:19	2:40	1:54:10	5:35:48
12	Nikolay Yaroshenko (RUS)	37:13	1:48	2:59:53	2:28	1:56:51	5:38:13
13	Anton Blokhin (UKR)	40:18	1:40	2:56:52	1:54	1:57:45	5:38:29
14	Aliaksandr Vasilevich (BLR)	39:49	1:57	2:57:08	1:49	2:00:17	5:41:00
15	Oliver Korfitsen (DEN)	39:54	2:18	2:56:46	2:36	2:01:16	5:42:50
16	Philippe Lamberty (LUX)	40:14	1:55	2:56:49	1:59	2:02:06	5:43:03
17	Kristian Hindkjær (DEN)	40:17	1:57	2:56:34	2:24	2:06:56	5:48:08
18	Tuomas Lampainen (FIN)	42:53	2:14	3:01:25	2:53	2:01:44	5:51:09
19	Kim Harju (FIN)	40:15	2:00	2:56:54	2:10	2:13:20	5:54:39
20	Frank Sorbara (CAN)	40:49	2:47	3:05:02	2:34	2:04:54	5:56:06
21	Kaito Tohara (JPN)	43:40	2:02	3:09:04	2:30	1:59:45	5:57:01
22	Alexandru Diaconu (ROU)	43:14	1:54	3:12:08	2:25	2:05:54	6:05:35
23	Ilkka Utriainen (FIN)	43:49	2:16	3:10:53	2:46	2:06:58	6:06:42
24	Thomas Roos (USA)	37:09	2:51	3:13:03	1:50	2:13:26	6:08:19
25	Jonas Örarbäck (SWE)	48:17	2:04	3:12:07	2:14	2:17:04	6:21:46
26	John Hirsch (USA)	43:45	2:09	3:33:09	2:16	2:28:24	6:49:43
-	Denis Sketako (SLO)	45:26	2:13	-	-	-	DNF
-	Ryosuke Yamamoto (JPN)	40:10	1:57	-	-	-	DNF
-	Emilio Aguayo (ESP)	37:24	2:20	-	-	-	DNF
Key : DNF - did not finish ; DNS - did not start

=== Women ===
Rank	Athlete	Swim	T1	Bike	T2	Run	Overall time
1st place, gold medalist(s)	Helle Frederiksen (DEN)	39:35	1:53	3:09:23	1:46	1:56:27	5:49:04
2nd place, silver medalist(s)	Barbara Riveros (CHI)	39:43	1:48	3:09:25	2:51	1:57:35	5:51:22
3rd place, bronze medalist(s)	Annabel Luxford (AUS)	39:38	1:47	3:09:22	1:50	2:03:10	5:55:47
4	Camilla Pedersen (DEN)	39:40	1:45	3:09:28	1:51	2:06:37	5:59:21
5	Maja Stage Nielsen (DEN)	44:47	1:47	3:11:05	1:54	2:08:56	6:08:29
6	Alexandra Tondeur (BEL)	45:39	1:57	3:18:09	2:04	2:01:37	6:09:26
7	Gurutze Frades Larralde (ESP)	48:51	2:26	3:14:33	2:01	2:04:27	6:12:18
8	Michelle Vesterby (DEN)	44:02	2:00	3:11:41	2:24	2:14:31	6:14:38
9	Pernille Thalund (DEN)	42:35	2:22	3:13:19	2:15	2:14:17	6:14:48
10	Anna Noguera (ESP)	45:25	1:59	3:18:28	2:05	2:07:50	6:15:47
11	Hanna Maksimava (BLR)	44:40	1:57	3:26:32	2:14	2:04:07	6:19:30
12	Heini Hartikainen (FIN)	48:48	2:10	3:21:00	2:16	2:10:55	6:25:09
13	Dimity-Lee Duke (AUS)	48:51	2:28	3:19:33	2:07	2:14:25	6:27:24
14	Jenny Nilsson (SWE)	48:55	1:56	3:29:38	2:22	2:05:33	6:28:24
15	Akiko Inaba (JPN)	45:26	2:03	3:28:46	2:20	2:24:36	6:43:11
16	Nagiho Ishida (JPN)	45:23	2:02	4:01:25	3:21	2:24:42	7:16:53
-	Ana Filipa Santos (POR)	47:04	3:59	-	-	-	DNF
Key : DNF - did not finish ; DNS - did not start

== Para triathlon and Age group championships ==
In addition to the elite races a number of age group and para triathlon championships were held: the winners of each class are listed below.

Classification	Athlete	Nation	Overall time
PTWC Men	Mark Conway (H1)	Great Britain	7:26:28
PTS3 Women	Maria Huche	Denmark	11:10:17
PTVI Men	Iain Dawson (B3)	Great Britain	7:02:09
18-19 Female AG	Emma Green	New Zealand	8:37:17
18-19 Male AG	Lucas Deer	Australia	6:21:52
20-24 Female AG	Line Bonde	Denmark	6:30:33
20-24 Male AG	Giovanni Bianco	Italy	6:02:56
25-29 Female AG	Anna Buur Trads	Denmark	6:47:47
25-29 Male AG	Mikkel Mortensen	Denmark	5:43:50
30-34 Female AG	Flora Colledge	Great Britain	6:24:48
30-34 Male AG	John Kelly	United States	5:59:43
35-39 Female AG	Lisa Schröder-Ott	Germany	6:36:21
35-39 Male AG	Jan-Morten Ra	Norway	6:01:17
40-44 Female AG	Marie Brandt Schultz	Denmark	6:43:29
40-44 Male AG	Jan Henningsen	Denmark	5:49:41
45-49 Female AG	Bernarda Thompson	United States	6:21:18
45-49 Male AG	Dave Slavinski	United States	6:07:27
50-54 Female AG	Gill Fullen	Great Britain	6:43:49
50-54 Male AG	Michael Krüger	Denmark	6:02:25
55-59 Female AG	Leslie Knibb	United States	7:09:39
55-59 Male AG	Steffen Lüders	Denmark	6:28:50
60-64 Female AG	Jane Wiley	Great Britain	7:27:18
60-64 Male AG	Michel Morret	France	6:39:00
65-69 Female AG	Suzanne Mink	United States	10:04:01
65-69 Male AG	Jim Stewart	Canada	7:07:11
70-74 Male AG	Heinz Wolf	Switzerland	8:31:48
75-79 Female AG	Sibyl Jacobson	United States	10:41:59
