= 2008 Ironman 70.3 World Championship =

The 2008 Ironman 70.3 World Championship was a triathlon competition held in Clearwater, Florida on November 8, 2008. The race was sponsored by Foster Grant and organized by the World Triathlon Corporation. The championship race is the culmination of the Ironman 70.3 series of events that took place from October 2007 to September 2008. Athletes, both professional and amateur, earn a spot in the championship race by qualifying in races throughout the 70.3 series. The 2008 championship race was represented by athletes from 52 different countries and 46 different U.S. States.

== Medallists ==
=== Men ===
Pos.	Time (h:mm:ss)	Name	Country	Split times (h:mm:ss)				
Pos.	Time (h:mm:ss)	Name	Country	Swim	T1	Bike	T2	Run
Gold medal	3:40:10	Terenzo Bozzone	New Zealand	22:17	1:59	2:01:29	1:29	1:12:57
Silver medal	3:40:42	Andreas Raelert	Germany	22:22	2:21	2:03:27	1:32	1:10:54
Bronze medal	3:41:47	Richie Cunningham	Great Britain	22:29	1:53	2:02:08	1:28	1:13:50
4	3:42:28	Oscar Galindez	Argentina	23:47	2:03	1:59:55	1:56	1:14:47
5	3:43:22	Reinaldo Colucci	Brazil	23:03	2:09	2:00:34	1:49	1:15:47
6	3:44:30	Andy Potts	United States	21:44	1:47	2:02:58	1:45	1:16:16
7	3:45:11	Luke McKenzie	Australia	22:22	2:03	2:02:01	1:29	1:17:16
8	3:45:43	Brent McMahon	Canada	22:20	2:00	2:03:56	5:51	1:11:36
9	3:46:22	Joe Gambles	United Kingdom	23:46	1:22	2:01:25	1:44	1:18:05
10	3:46:34	Fraser Cartmell	United Kingdom	22:09	2:01	2:02:24	1:39	1:18:21

=== Women ===
Pos.	Time (h:mm:ss)	Name	Country	Split times (h:mm:ss)				
Pos.	Time (h:mm:ss)	Name	Country	Swim	T1	Bike	T2	Run
Gold medal	4:02:49	Joanna Zeiger	United States	23:06	2:17	2:13:44	1:45	1:21:59
Silver medal	4:04:07	Mary Beth Ellis	United States	23:32	2:14	2:13:19	1:46	1:23:19
Bronze medal	4:07:32	Becky Lavelle	United States	23:03	2:09	2:13:50	1:47	1:26:46
4	4:09:10	Julie Dibens	United Kingdom	23:17	2:18	2:13:22	1:42	1:28:31
5	4:15:32	Nina Kraft	Germany	23:35	2:19	2:24:28	1:49	1:23:21
6	4:16:00	Erika Csomor	Hungary	27:41	2:35	2:20:08	1:48	1:23:48
7	4:16:28	Catriona Morrison	United Kingdom	28:04	2:03	2:18:41	2:41	1:24:59
8	4:16:49	Angela Naeth	Canada	28:32	2:14	2:17:34	1:57	1:26:32
9	4:18:50	Leanda Cave	United Kingdom	23:24	2:26	2:22:32	2:17	1:28:11
10	4:20:28	Amanda Stevens	United States	23:29	2:19	2:24:23	1:40	1:28:37

== Qualification ==
The 2008 Ironman 70.3 Series featured 29 events that enabled qualification to the 2008 World Championship event to its top age group finishers, with all races also awarding professional slots. Some 70.3 events also acted as qualifiers for the full Ironman World Championships in Hawaii. The 70.3 Series expanded the number of qualifying races from 23 in 2007 to 29 events in 2008. Those events added included races at Geelong, Australia, Penha, Brazil (replacing the race in Brasília), Huntsville, Ontario, Pucón, Chile, Haikou, China, Buffalo City, South Africa, Boise, Idaho, Lawrence, Kansas, and Providence, Rhode Island. Events in Port Macquarie and Ensenada, Baja California were discontinued from the series.

=== Qualifying Ironman 70.3s ===
Date	Event	Location
Nov 10, 2007	Ironman 70.3 World Championship	Clearwater, Florida, United States
Jan 13, 2008	Ironman 70.3 South Africa	Buffalo City, South Africa
Jan 20, 2008	Ironman 70.3 Pucón	Pucón, Chile
Feb 9, 2008	Ironman 70.3 Geelong	Geelong, Australia
Mar 29, 2008	Ironman 70.3 California	Oceanside, California, United States
Apr 20, 2008	Ironman 70.3 China	Haikou, China
May 4, 2008	Ironman 70.3 St. Croix	(United States Virgin Islands) St. Croix, US Virgin Islands
May 18, 2008	Ironman 70.3 Florida	Orlando, Florida, United States
May 24, 2008	Ironman 70.3 Austria	Sankt Pölten/Vienna, Austria
May 31, 2008	Ironman 70.3 Hawaii	Kohala, Hawaii, United States
Jun 1, 2008	Ironman 70.3 Switzerland	Rapperswil-Jona, Switzerland
Jun 1, 2008	Ironman 70.3 Boise	Boise, Idaho, United States
Jun 8, 2008	Ironman 70.3 Eagleman	Cambridge, Maryland, United States
Jun 15, 2008	Ironman 70.3 U.K.	Wimbleball, United Kingdom
Jun 15, 2008	Ironman 70.3 Kansas	Lawrence, Kansas, United States
Jun 29, 2008	Ironman 70.3 Buffalo Springs	Lubbock, Texas, United States
Jul 6, 2008	Ironman 70.3 Lake Stevens	Lake Stevens, Washington, United States
Jul 13, 2008	Ironman 70.3 Rhode Island	Providence, Rhode Island, United States
Jul 20, 2008	Ironman 70.3 Newfoundland	Corner Brook, Newfoundland, Canada
Jul 20, 2008	Ironman 70.3 Vineman	Sonoma County, California, United States
Aug 2, 2008	Ironman 70.3 Steelhead	Benton Harbor, Michigan, United States
Aug 3, 2008	Ironman 70.3 Antwerp	Antwerp, Belgium
Aug 10, 2008	Ironman 70.3 Germany	Wiesbaden, Germany
Aug 17, 2008	Ironman 70.3 Timberman	Gilford, New Hampshire, United States
Sep 7, 2008	Ironman 70.3 Monaco	Monaco
Sep 7, 2008	Ironman 70.3 Singapore	Singapore
Sep 14, 2008	Ironman 70.3 Brazil	Penha, Brazil
Sep 14, 2008	Ironman 70.3 Muskoka	Huntsville, Ontario, Canada
Sep 21, 2008	Ironman 70.3 Cancún	Cancún, Mexico

=== 2008 Ironman 70.3 Series results ===
==== Men ====
Event	Gold	Time	Silver	Time	Bronze	Time	Reference
Clearwater	Andy Potts (USA)	3:42:33	Oscar Galíndez (ARG)	3:42:37	Andrew Johns (GBR)	3:43:11	
South Africa	Raynard Tissink (RSA)	4:03:02	Frederik Van Lierde (BEL)	4:04:25	Fraser Cartmell (GBR)	4:10:40	
Pucón	Reinaldo Colucci (BRA)	4:00:25	Oscar Galíndez (ARG)	4:03:25	Santiago Ascenco (BRA)	4:07:43	
Geelong	Leon Griffin (AUS)	3:56:49	Mitchell Anderson (AUS)	3:58:13	David Dellow (AUS)	4:01:01	
California	Andy Potts (USA)	3:58:22	Craig Alexander (AUS)	3:58:25	Paul Ambrose (GBR)	4:03:32	
China	Steven Waite (AUS)	4:29:06	Fredrik Croneborg (SWE)	4:30:18	Colin Hill (GBR)	4:30:38	
St. Croix	Craig Alexander (AUS)	4:05:34	Marino Vanhoenacker (BEL)	4:08:41	Richie Cunningham (AUS)	4:10:02	
Florida	Paul Amey (GBR)	3:52:51	Santiago Ascenco (BRA)	3:56:33	Spencer Smith (GBR)	3:59:04	
Austria	Massimo Cigana (ITA)	3:56:12	Björn Andersson (SWE)	3:56:52	Michael Göhner (GER)	3:57:11	
Hawaii	Chris McCormack (AUS)	4:04:22	Luke McKenzie (AUS)	4:12:05	Tim Marr (USA)	4:15:17	
Switzerland	Ronnie Schildknecht (SUI)	3:51:45	Konstantin Bachor (GER)	3:52:33	Sebastian Kienle (GER)	3:55:40	
Boise	Terenzo Bozzone (NZL)	3:53:28	Chris Lieto (USA)	3:55:44	Joe Gambles (USA)	3:55:54	
Eagleman	Paul Amey (GBR)	3:53:32	Terenzo Bozzone (NZL)	3:56:23	Richie Cunningham (AUS)	3:58:22	
UK	Fraser Cartmell (GBR)	4:17:39	Stephen Bayliss (GBR)	4:17:52	Luke Bell (AUS)	4:24:38	
Kansas	Terenzo Bozzone (NZL)	3:56:06	Craig Alexander (AUS)	3:58:25	Leon Griffin (AUS)	4:00:37	
Buffalo Springs	Leon Griffin (AUS)	3:58:35	Tim O'Donnell (USA)	4:00:09	Paul Matthews (AUS)	4:02:08	
Lake Stevens	Luke Bell (USA)	4:00:16	Joe Gambles (USA)	4:00:17	Chris Legh (AUS)	4:01:44	
Rhode Island	Oscar Galíndez (ARG)	3:54:03	Richie Cunningham (AUS)	3:56:46	Paul Ambrose (GBR)	3:57:48	
Newfoundland	Craig Alexander (AUS)	3:59:45	Richie Cunningham (AUS)	4:01:33	Chris Legh (AUS)	4:04:09	
Vineman	Terenzo Bozzone (NZL)	3:49:40	Craig Alexander (AUS)	3:51:25	Steve Larsen (USA)	3:53:22	
Steelhead	Chris Legh (AUS)	3:32:13	Justin Henkel (USA)	3:37:05	Tony White (USA)	3:41:34	
Antwerp	Marino Vanhoenacker (BEL)	3:45:33	Luc Van Lierde (BEL)	3:46:33	Teemu Toivanen (FIN)	3:51:38	
Germany	Faris Al-Sultan (GER)	4:10:26	Alessandro Degasperi (ITA)	4:11:17	Uwe Widmann (GER)	4:14:01	
Timberman	Andy Potts (USA)	3:52:32	Fraser Cartmell (GBR)	4:02:24	Simon Lessing (GBR)	4:03:10	
Monaco	Andreas Raelert (GER)	4:10:10	Michael Weiss (AUT)	4:14:12	Sebastian Kienle (GER)	4:14:48	
Singapore	Simon Thompson (AUS)	3:55:40	Terenzo Bozzone (NZL)	3:55:55	Pete Jacobs (AUS)	3:57:47	
Brazil	Oscar Galíndez (ARG)	3:54:24	Igor Amorelli (BRA)	3:55:07	Juraci Jùnior (BRA)	3:59:53	
Muskoka	Craig Alexander (AUS)	4:10:31	Richie Cunningham (AUS)	4:14:58	Daniel Bretscher (USA)	4:16:43	
Cancún	Chris Legh (AUS)	4:01:47	Oscar Galíndez (ARG)	4:03:10	Igor Amorelli (BRA)	4:03:26	

==== Women ====
Event	Gold	Time	Silver	Time	Bronze	Time	Reference
Clearwater	Mirinda Carfrae (AUS)	4:07:25	Samantha McGlone (CAN)	4:11:29	Leanda Cave (GBR)	4:12:29	
South Africa	Desiree Ficker (USA)	4:46:46	Heidi Jesberger (GER)	4:58:50	Lucie Zelenkova (CZE)	5:01:59	
Pucón	Heather Gollnick (USA)	4:37:02	Linsey Corbin (USA)	4:38:57	Tereza Macel (CZE)	4:42:27	
Geelong	Mirinda Carfrae (AUS)	4:24:27	Rebekah Keat (AUS)	4:27:14	Kate Major (AUS)	4:29:21	
California	Erika Csomor (HUN)	4:23:14	Mirinda Carfrae (AUS)	4:25:51	Leanda Cave (GBR)	4:26:40	
China	Renee Tanya Lane (AUS)	5:02:24	Hiromi Toda (JPN)	5:15:50	Claire Murray (GBR)	5:24:07	
St. Croix	Mirinda Carfrae (AUS)	4:26:56	Nina Kraft (GER)	4:36:33	Bree Wee (USA)	4:36:45	
Florida	Leanda Cave (GBR)	4:22:52	Nina Kraft (GER)	4:24:15	Dede Griesbauer (USA)	4:30:38	
Austria	Yvonne van Vlerken (NED)	4:22:43	Erika Csomor (HUN)	4:25:52	Sandra Wallenhorst (GER)	4:26:25	
Hawaii	Samantha McGlone (CAN)	4:30:38	Tyler Stewart (USA)	4:34:21	Kate Bevilaqua (AUS)	4:35:03	
Switzerland	Julie Dibens (GBR)	4:12:57	Nicola Spirig (SWE)	4:14:55	Erika Csomor (HUN)	4:26:57	
Boise	Kate Major (AUS)	4:24:44	Desiree Ficker (USA)	4:31:20	Heather Wuertele (CAN)	4:31:47	
Eagleman	Joanna Zeiger (USA)	4:22:31	Dede Griesbauer (USA)	4:30:23	Kelly Handel (USA)	4:31:57	
UK	Bella Comerford (GBR)	4:49:44	Julie Dibens (GBR)	4:54:59	Sara Sig Moeller (DEN)	5:07:03	
Kansas	Samantha McGlone (CAN)	4:19:03	Joanna Lawn (NZL)	4:19:32	Linsey Corbin (USA)	4:36:11	
Buffalo Springs	Mirinda Carfrae (AUS)	4:23:28	Joanna Zeiger (USA)	4:27:29	Joanna Lawn (NZL)	4:28:23	
Lake Stevens	Mary Beth Ellis (USA)	4:33:43	Linsey Corbin (USA)	4:38:23	Fiona Docherty (NZL)	4:40:59	
Rhode Island	Lisa Bentley (CAN)	4:27:50	Annie Gervais (CAN)	4:33:46	Andrea Fisher (USA)	4:37:59	
Newfoundland	Mirinda Carfrae (AUS)	4:27:23	Cynthia Wilson (CAN)	4:33:34	Magali Tisseyre (CAN)	4:37:56	
Vineman	Joanna Zeiger (USA)	4:19:58	Tyler Stewart (USA)	4:20:20	Samantha McGlone (CAN)	4:24:08	
Steelhead	Gina Kehr (USA)	4:04:09	Kimberly Von During (USA)	4:12:40	Renee Damstra (USA)	4:16:00	
Antwerp	Belinda Granger (AUS)	4:12:56	Felicity Hart (GBR)	4:15:19	Tine Deckers (BEL)	4:16:54	
Germany	Virginia Berasategui (ESP)	4:43:38	Andrea Brede (GER)	4:49:26	Meike Krebs (GER)	4:55:48	
Timberman	Chrissie Wellington (GBR)	4:11:46	Amanda Stevens (USA)	4:30:03	Cynthia Wilson (CAN)	4:31:26	
Monaco	Nicola Spirig (SUI)	4:37:12	Catriona Morrison (GBR)	4:41:12	Virginia Berasategui (ESP)	4:44:45	
Singapore	Rebekah Keat (AUS)	4:25:43	Gina Ferguson (NZL)	4:29:46	Alison Fitch (AUS)	4:31:45	
Brazil	Mariana Ohata (BRA)	4:25:35	Vanessa Gianinni (BRA)	4:25:41	Ana Borba (BRA)	4:29:21	
Muskoka	Joanna Zeiger (USA)	4:37:04	Rebeccah Wassner (USA)	4:42:49	Angela Naeth (CAN)	4:43:27	
Cancún	Kim Loeffler (USA)	4:33:33	Caroline Smith (USA)	4:44:57	Dunia Gómez (MEX)	4:46:52	
