= Huys =

Huys is a surname. Notable people with this surname include:

- Auguste-Léopold Huys (1871–1938), French missionary
- Mario Huys (born 1959), Belgian triathlete
- Modest Huys (1874–1932), Flemish painter
- Pieter Huys (c.1519–c.1584), Flemish Renaissance painter.
- Servaas Huys (1940–2016), Dutch politician
- Twan Huys (born 1964), Dutch journalist, television presenter and author
