= Ryōsuke =

- Pronunciation: Ryōsuke
- Gender: Male
- Language: Japanese

Ryōsuke, Ryosuke, Ryousuke or Ryohsuke (written: 亮輔, 亮弼, 亮介, 涼介, 良介 or りょうすけ in hiragana) is a Japanese masculine given name. Notable people with the name include:

== Notable people with the given name Ryosuke ==
- Ryosuke Baba (馬場 亮輔; born 1984), Japanese artistic gymnast
- Ryosuke Doi (土井 陵輔; born 2002), Japanese artistic gymnast
- Ryōsuke Sota (曽田陵介; born 1997), Japanese actor and model
- Ryōsuke Hashiguchi (born 1962), Japanese film director
- Ryosuke Hashimoto (born 1993), Japanese idol singer (A.B.C-Z)
- Ryōsuke Ishizu (1907–1986), Japanese photographer
- Ryosuke Iwasa (born 1989), Japanese boxer
- Ryōsuke Kagawa (1896–1987), Japanese actor
- Ryosuke Kanzaki (神崎 亮佑; born 1982), Japanese footballer
- Ryosuke Kikuchi (菊池 涼介; born 1990), Japanese professional baseball player
- Kuroda Kiyotaka a.k.a. Kuroda Ryōsuke (1907–1986), Japanese politician
- Ryosuke Kojima (小島 亨介; born 1997), Japanese footballer
- Ryosuke Nakamura (中村 亮介; born 1985), Japanese shogi player
- Ryosuke Okuno (奥野 僚右; born 1968), Japanese footballer and manager
- Ryosuke Sakazume (坂爪 亮介; born 1990), Japanese speed skater
- Ryosuke Sasaki (佐々木 亮輔; born 1993), Japanese handball player
- Ryosuke Shimizu (born 1980), Japanese karateka
- Ryōsuke Takahashi (born 1943), Japanese anime director
- Ryōsuke Tei (born 1965), Japanese animator
- Ryousuke Tsuchiya (土屋 良輔; born 1994), Japanese speed skater
- Ryosuke Yamada (山田涼介, born 1993), Japanese idol, singer, and actor

=== Other ===
- Ryosuke Yamamoto (disambiguation), multiple people
