= Jüri Käen =

Estonian swimmer and coach

Personal information
- Born: August 4, 1970 (age 55) Tallinn, then part of Estonian SSR, Soviet Union

Sport
- Sport: Swimming
Medal record
Representing Estonia
Baltic States Swimming Championships
Gold medal – first place	1990	400m freestyle

Jüri Käen (born 4 August 1970) is an Estonian swimmer and coach.

He was born in Tallinn. In 1989 he graduated from Estonian Sports Gymnasium, and in 1993 Tallinn Pedagogical Institute's Faculty of Physical Education.

He started his swimming exercising in 1977, coached by Ann Schiff. In 1990 he was Baltic champion in 400 m freestyle swimming. He is multiple-times Estonian champion in long-distance swimming. 1988–1992 he was a member of Estonian national swimming team.

After 1992 he has been a triathlon coach. Students include: Kirill Litovtšenko, Marko Albert, Ain-Alar Juhanson, Raimo Raudsepp, Aleksandr Latin, Kirill Kotšegarov, Eero Raudsepp, Imre Tiidemann, Indrek Tobreluts.

1998–2011 he was the head coach of Estonian Triathlon Association.
