= Ben Hoffman (triathlete) =

American triathlete

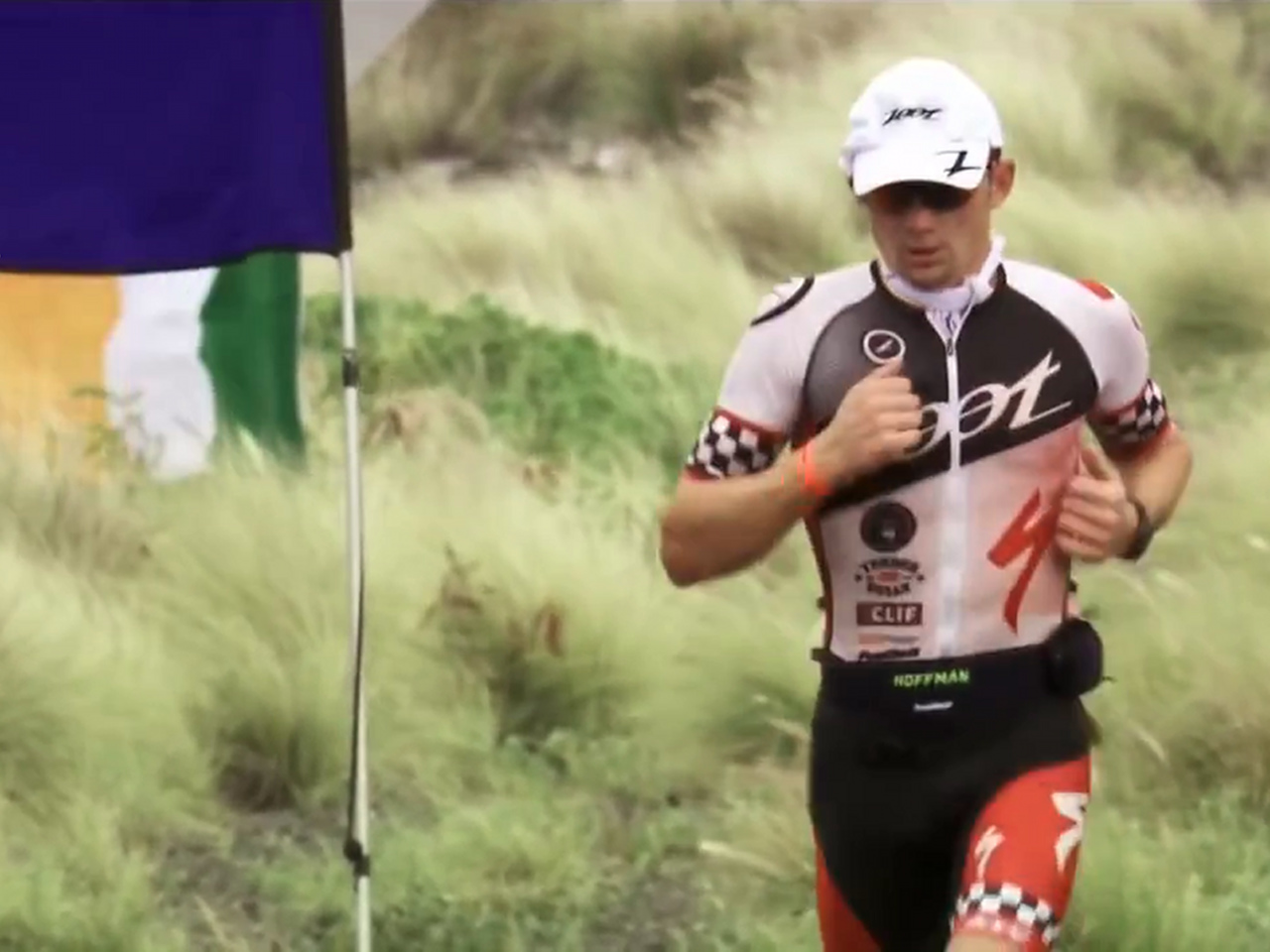
- Ben Hoffman at 2014 Ironman Hawaii

Personal information
- Nickname: Hoff
- Nationality: American
- Born: August 22, 1983 (age 42) Grand Junction, Colorado
- Height: 5 ft 11 in (1.80 m)
- Weight: 160 lb (73 kg)

Sport
- Sport: Triathlon
- Turned pro: 2007
- Coached by: Elliot Bassett (2008-2015) and Ryan Bolton (2017-present)
Medal record
Men's Triathlon
Representing United States
Ironman Triathlon World Championship
Silver medal – second place	2014	Elite

Ben Hoffman (born August 22, 1983) is an American professional triathlete from Grand Junction, Colorado who races in long distance, non-drafting triathlon events. In 2014 he placed second at the Ironman World Championship.

== Career ==
Hoffman grew up in Grand Junction, Colorado where he participated in basketball, track, golf, and soccer in high school. He also took part in week long bicycle tours and a partial cross-country ride with his parents. After high school he attended the University of Montana where he earned a degree in Spanish language with a minor in English. Hoffman discovered triathlon during a summer trip to Alaska during which he found a book about training and racing. As a result, during his first year at Montana, 2003—2004, he joined the university club triathlon team (that included Linsey Corbin) as well as Team Stampede in Missoula where he enjoyed the people associated with the team, the training the sport required, and the competitiveness. Despite having no swimming background he was able to move past that obstacle and compete in his first race, the 2004 Grizzly Triathlon, where he took second place. In 2005 he took time to travel to Argentina. While away he had missed the sport and upon returning he decided that he would get serious about competing in triathlon. In his final year at Montana, Hoffman won the individual 2006 collegiate national championship and his club team won the overall Collegiate Triathlon National Championship.

Following graduation, Hoffman raced in triathlons in the Pacific Northwest and Canada while supporting himself just enough through race winnings that summer. He capped his summer racing off by traveling to Europe and competing in the 2006 World University Championships in Lausanne where he placed 39th. He committed to racing as a professional after that summer and moved to Durango, Colorado to train. There he worked part-time at the local health department doing Spanish translations and living paycheck to paycheck while training. His first race as a pro athlete came at the Wildflower Triathlon in 2007 where he took 3rd place. After a few years of part-time work at the health department he stopped working to become a full-time pro triathlete. In 2011 he moved his training base to Boulder, Colorado.

Hoffman has focused primarily on racing half-iron and ironman distance racing (e.g. Ironman 70.3 and Ironman Triathlon). He has won six Ironman events (Ironman Lake Placid, St. George, Wisconsin, Coeur d'Alene, and twice at Ironman South Africa) as well as numerous half iron-distance races. At the 2014 Ironman World Championship he had a break-through performance where he took 2nd place, five minutes back of winner Sebastian Kienle. His previous four finishes at the championship were 102nd, 53rd, DNF, and 15th.

=== Notable results ===
Hoffman's notable race results include:

Results list

Date	Event	Position	Total time
2017	Ironman African Championship	Gold medal	7:58:40
2016	2016 Xterra World Championships	7th	3:01:40
2016	2016 Ironman World Championship	4th	8:13:00
2016	Ironman African Championship	Gold medal	8:12:37
2016	Ironman 70.3 Buenos Aires	Silver medal	3:45:39
2015	2015 Ironman World Championship	28th	9:05:22
2015	Ironman Calgary 70.3	Gold medal	3:50:43
2014	2014 Ironman World Championship	Silver medal	8:19:23
2014	Ironman 70.3 Lake Stevens	Silver medal	3:55:18
2014	Ironman Coeur d'Alene	Bronze medal	8:29:12
2014	Ironman 70.3 New Orleans	Silver medal	3:51:46
2014	Ironman 70.3 Monterrey	Bronze medal	3:52:22
2013	Ironman Coeur d'Alene	Gold medal	8:17:31
2012	Ironman Wisconsin	Gold medal	8:32:51
2012	Ironman St. George	Gold medal	9:07:04
2011	Ironman Lake Placid	Silver medal	8:33:29
2011	Ironman 70.3 Branson	Gold medal	4:09:02
2011	Ironman 70.3 Muncie	Gold medal	3:48:14
2011	Ironman 70.3 Boise	Gold medal	3:52:41
2010	Ironman 70.3 Branson	Gold medal	4:02:53
2010	Ironman Lake Placid	Gold medal	8:39:34
2010	Ironman St. George	Silver medal	8:52:54
2010	Xterra Four Corners	Gold medal	2:15:06
2009	Ironman 70.3 Calgary	Silver medal	4:02:51
