= Joanna Zeiger =

American triathlete

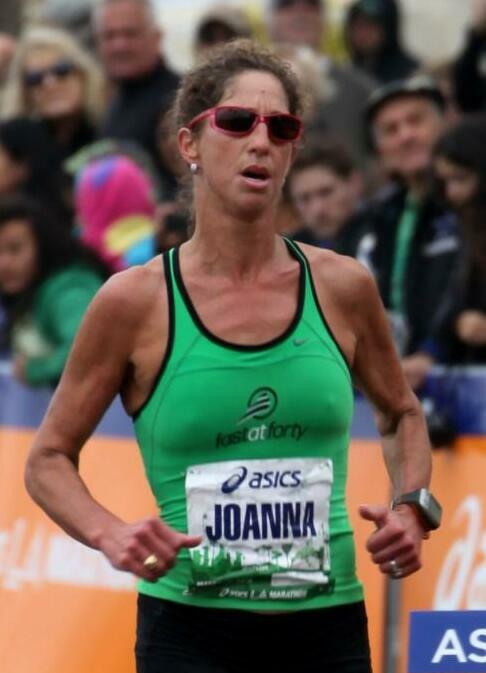
- Zeiger in 2013

Personal information
- Born: May 4, 1970 (age 56) Baltimore, Maryland, U.S.
- Height: 1.63 m (5 ft 4 in)
- Weight: 52 kg (115 lb)

Sport
- Country: United States
- Turned pro: 1998
Medal record
Representing United States
Women's triathlon
Ironman World Championship 70.3
Gold medal – first place	2008	Individual
ITU Triathlon World Championships
Bronze medal – third place	2001 Edmonton	Elite

Joanna Sue Zeiger (born May 4, 1970) is an American triathlete who was the 2008 Ironman 70.3 world champion. Zeiger represented the United States at the 2000 Summer Olympics in triathlon. She's the author of The Champions Mindset - An Athlete's Guide to Mental Toughness.

== Early and personal life ==
Zeiger was born in Baltimore, Maryland, grew up in San Diego, California, lives in Boulder, Colorado, and is Jewish. She attended Patrick Henry High School in San Diego, graduating in 1988.

== Career ==
Zeiger first began competing in swimming.

She and her sister, Laurie, represented the United States at the 1989 Maccabiah Games, the Jewish Olympics, in swimming. She won a gold medal, a silver medal, and two bronze medals.

She attended Brown University, where she held the school records in the 500-yard (460 m) freestyle, 1,000-yard (910 m) freestyle, and 1,650-yard (1,510 m) freestyle which she set in 1991. Zeiger received her PhD from Johns Hopkins University's Bloomberg School of Public Health in 2001. Competitive running and cycling were added to her repertoire in 1992 and 1993.

Zeiger competed at the first Olympic triathlon at the 2000 Summer Olympics. She placed fourth with a total time of 2:01:25.74. Her split times were 19:45.58 for the swim, 1:05:38.30 for the cycling, and 0:36:01.86 for the run. In the same year, she finished fifth at the Ironman World Championship with a time of 9:48:34. She's the winner of Ironman Brasil 2005 and Ironman Coeur d'Alene 2006.

In 2008, Zeiger won the Ironman 70.3 World Championship in Clearwater, Florida with a time of 4:02.49.

== Honors ==
Zeiger was named the 1997 Amateur Triathlete of the Year. In 1998, she was named 1998 USA Triathlon's Rookie of the year and in 2000 the USOC Triathlete of the year. Zeiger was honored by the Jewish Sports Hall of fame in March 2001.

== See also ==
- List of Jewish triathletes
