= Ain-Alar Juhanson =

Estonian triathlete

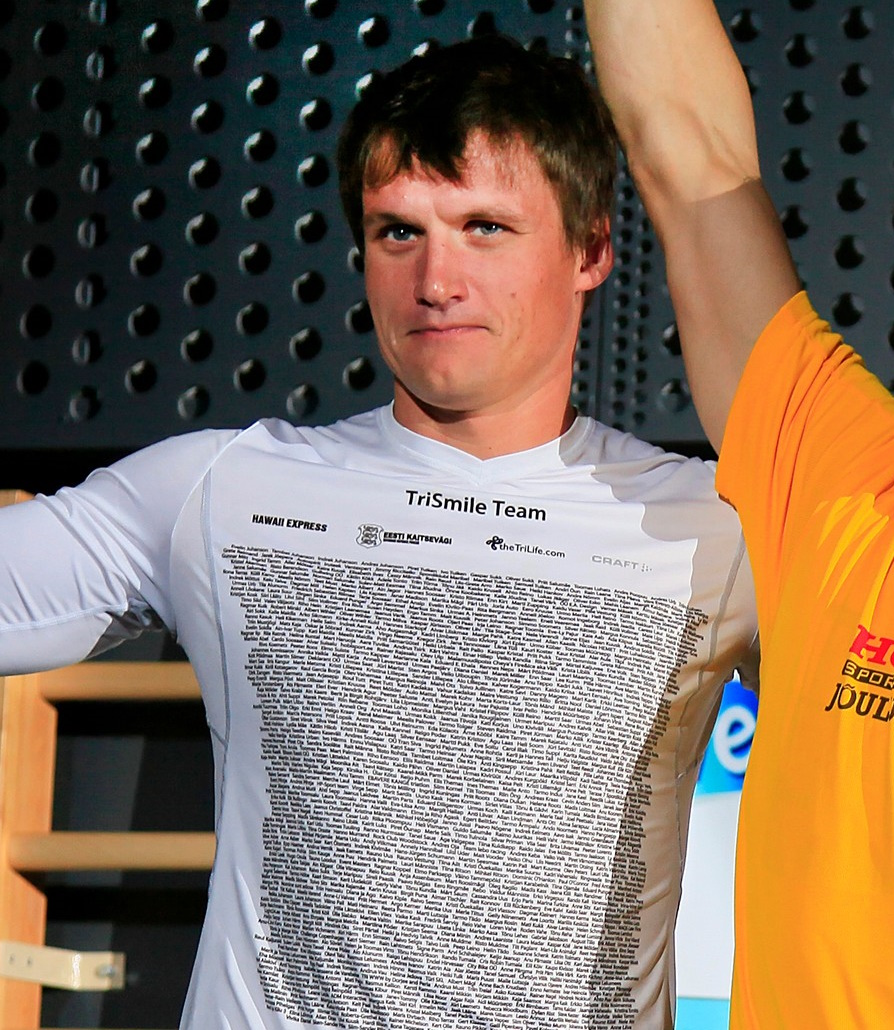
Ain-Alar Juhanson in 2009

Ain-Alar Juhanson (born 2 October 1976) is an Estonian triathlete.

He was born in Paide. In 1994 he graduated from Estonian Sports Gymnasium's Otepää branch.

He began his triathlon career in 1991. Since 1996 his coach was Jüri Käen. He is five-times Estonian champion. Since 2002 he focused on longer distances (longer than olympic triathlon). 2005 and 2006 he won the competition Ironman Lanzarote in Spain. He participated on 2008 Ironman World Championship.

Since 2018 he is one of the organizers of the competition Ironman Tallinn.

Awards:

- 2018: (Estonian: Eesti Kultuurkapitali kehakultuuri ja spordi sihtkapitali aastapreemia)
