= Y Gallery =

Ў Gallery
- Галерэя Ў
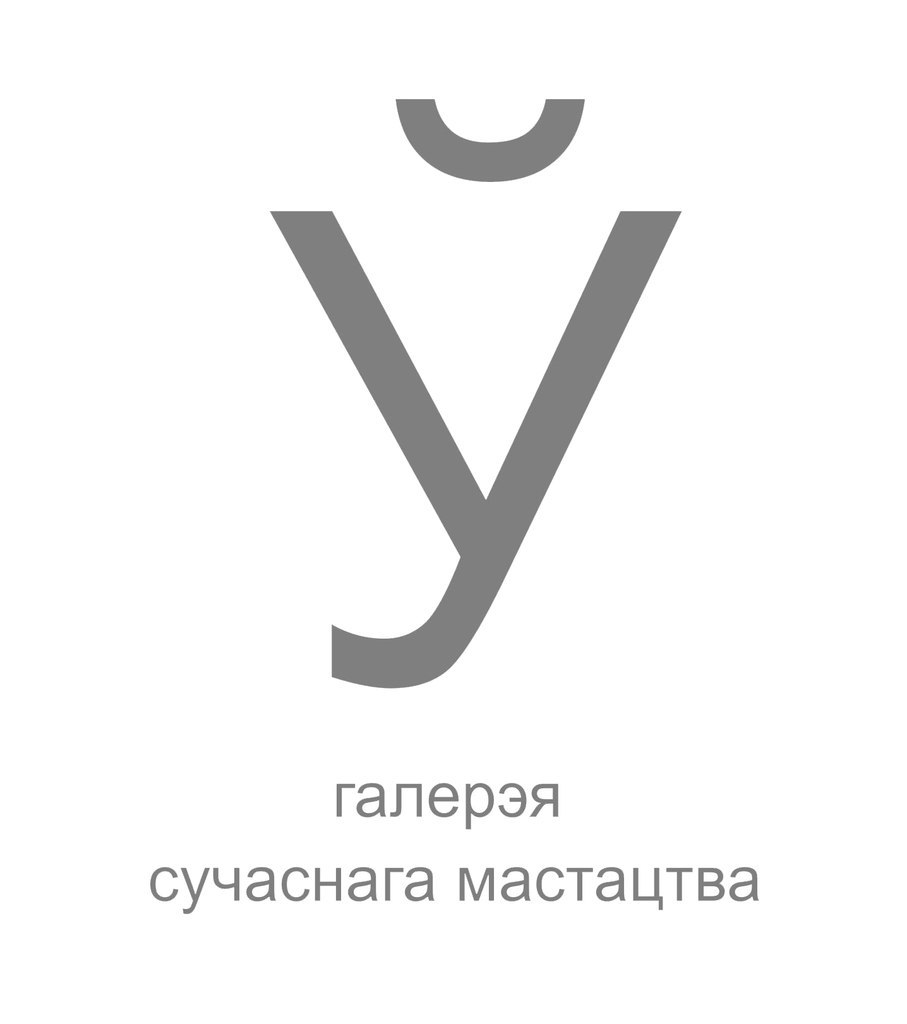
- Logotype of the Ў gallery
- Established: October 2009
- Dissolved: 29 October 2020
- Location: vulica Kastryčnickaja 19A, Minsk, Belarus
- Coordinates: 53°55′N 27°35′E
- Type: Art museum
- Director: Valentina Kiseleva
- Chairperson: Іlona Dzyarkach
- Curator: Valentina Kiseleva
- Architect: Alexei Lunev
- Website: en.ygallery.by

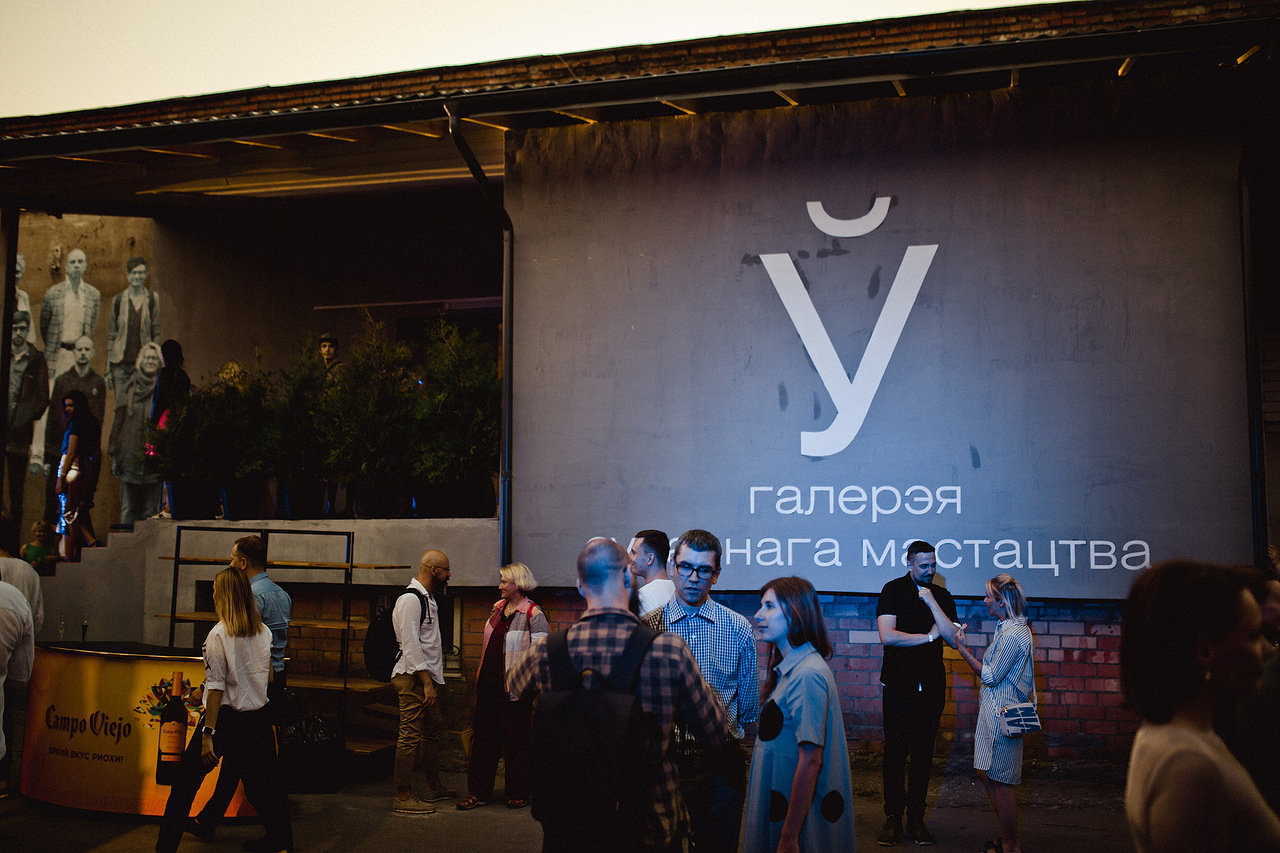
Main entrance to the gallery

The Ў Gallery (Y Gallery) (Belarusian: Галерэя Ў, romanized: Galereja Ŭ, lit. 'Ŭ Gallery') was an art gallery of contemporary art located in Minsk, the capital of Belarus. The Gallery Ў consisted of the exhibition space, wine bar Ў, design-shop and Literary House Logvinov.

== History ==
The gallery was opened in October 2009.

In 2010 the gallery launched the project START. The project's aim is to promote young Belarusian artists by organizing their solo exhibitions and public discussions.

Since the opening, the gallery has hosted more than 120 exhibitions and expositions in the gallery's building. Most of them are group and solo exhibitions of Belarusian artists. Also, the Ў Gallery has held 14 exhibitions abroad in such places as Vilnius (Lithuania), Poznan (Poland), Lublin (Poland), Moscow (Russia), and Stockholm (Sweden).

In 2020, the co-owner and creator of the gallery, Aliaksandr Vasilievič, became a political prisoner. He and his partners sold their stakes in the gallery (and the bar associated with it), but not the Ў gallery and Ў bar brands. The new owners decided to develop the space under the name Вершы (Vieršy, literally 'poems').

2012 year

== Origin of the name ==
The gallery's name derives from the Belarusian character «Ў», which distinguishes the Belarusian alphabet from other alphabets in the East Slavic group.

== Sales of works ==
In the gallery, there was an opportunity to buy various types of pictures and sculptures by modern Belarusian artists.

== Awards ==
The Y Gallery won the "Best Foreign Gallery" award on the annual art fair ArtVilnius in 2011 and 2016.
