= Tim Berkel =

Australian triathlete (born 1984)

Tim Van Berkel
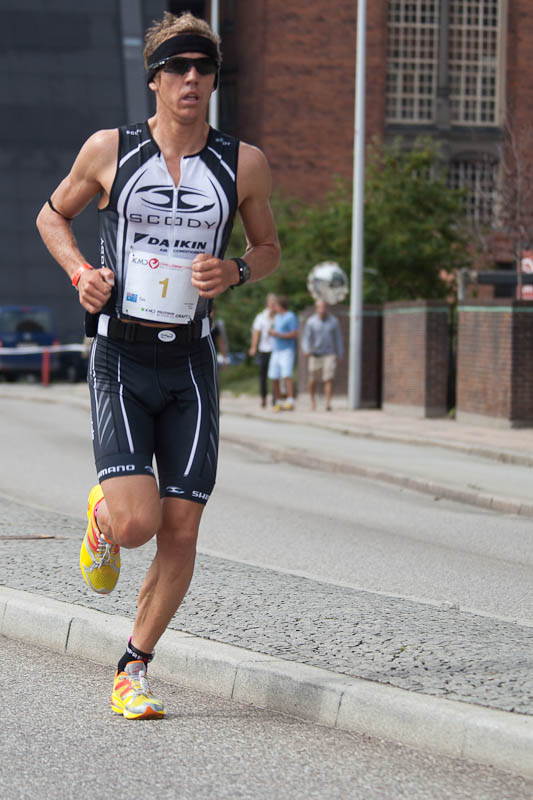
- Berkel at Challenge Copenhagen 2011

Personal information
- Full name: Timothy Peter Van Berkel
- Nicknames: Berkel, Berks, Spanky, Mitty
- Born: 29 June 1984 (age 42) Albury, New South Wales, Australia
- Height: 1.80 m (5 ft 11 in)
- Weight: 66 kg (146 lb)
- Website: www.timberkel.com

Sport
- Country: Australia
- Sport: Triathlon
- Turned pro: 2005

Timothy Peter Van Berkel (born 29 June 1984 in Albury, New South Wales) is an Australian professional triathlete who races primarily in long distance triathlon events.

== Career ==
Van Berkel grew up in Wodonga, Victoria and played Australian Rules Football (AFL). He began training for and competing in triathlons at the age of 18 as a way of staying fit during the AFL off-season. In 2004 and 2005 he competed predominately in Age-Group races Australia.

In 2005 he raced at the World Age Group Championships in Hawaii in the 20- to 24-year category, finishing 9th. That was his last race as an amateur. At the age of 21, Van Berkel was granted a professional license. His first race as a professional was Port Macquarie Half Ironman in October 2005. At this time Van Berkel decided to move to Ballina, New South Wales to be closer to his coach, Grant Giles of Team Aeromax, who was based in Port Macquarie, New South Wales.

In 2007, Van Berkel made his debut at Ironman distance, competing in the Ironman Australia Championships and finishing 7th. In 2008, at 24 years old, Berkel won Ironman Western Australia in 2008, making him the second youngest Ironman Champion, behind Germany's Thomas Hellriegel by 20 days. He won his second Ironman distance event at Challenge Copenhagen in 2010, surpassing Hellreigal's accomplishment of having two Ironman distance wins by three months. In 2011 Van Berkel successfully defended his Challenge Copenhagen title in a closely fought race with Denmark's Jimmy Johnsen. Since turning professional, Van Berkel has competed in Ironman and Ironman 70.3 events in Australia, Asia, Europe and America.

In 2014, Van Berkel debuted at the Ironman World Championship in Kona, Hawaii. He finished 7th in a time of 8:23:26.

In 2015, Van Berkel came 2nd in the Asia-Pacific Ironman Championship in Melbourne, Australia. He was narrowly beaten by Canadian-born triathlete, Jeff Symonds. In August, Van Berkel engaged Dr Daniel Plews as his new coach.

In August 2015, Van Berkel finished 2nd to fellow Australian triathlete, Tim Reed, by 2 seconds, in the Ironman 70.3 Asia-Pacific Championship held in Cebu, Philippines. Then, in September of the same year, Van Berkel won Ironman 70.3 Sunshine Coast.

== Personal life ==
Van Berkel lives in East Ballina, New South Wales.

== Professional record ==
Results list

Date/Year	Place	Competition	Venue	Time	Notes
2017/12/03	Third	Ironman Western Australia	Australia, Busselton, Western Australia	7:27:08	No swim leg for athletes due to sharks.
2017/11/26	Second	Ironman 70.3 Thailand	Thailand, Phuket, Thailand	3:52:49	
2017/10/14	Fifteenth	Ironman World Championship	United States, Kona, Hawaii	8:28:05	
2017/09/10	Second	Ironman 70.3 Sunshine Coast	Australia, Mooloolaba, Queensland	3:54:08	
2017/06/12	Fourth	Ironman Asia-Pacific Championship	Australia, Cairns, Queensland	8:09:22	
2017/05/07	First	Ironman 70.3 Vietnam	Vietnam, Danang	3:56:19	
2017/03/19	Fifth	Ironman 70.3 Taiwan	Taiwan, Taitung, Taiwan	3:55:01	
2017/03/12	Sixth	Ironman 70.3 Subic Bay	Philippines, Subic Bay	3:54:52	
2017/02/19	Seventh	Ironman 70.3 Geelong	Australia, Geelong, Victoria	3:56:28	
2016/12/11	Fourth	Ironman 70.3 Ballarat	Australia, Ballarat, Victoria	3:55:50	
2016/11/27	Third	Ironman 70.3 Thailand	Thailand, Phuket, Thailand	4:05:32	
2016/10/08	Nineteenth	Ironman World Championship	United States, Kona, Hawaii	8:35:27	
2016/06/12	First	Ironman Asia-Pacific Championship	Australia, Cairns, Queensland	8:15:03	
2016/05/08	Second	Ironman 70.3 Vietnam	Vietnam, Danang	3:55:08	
2016/04/10	Second	Ironman African Championship	South Africa, Nelson Bay	8:14:51	
2016/03/06	Fourth	Ironman 70.3 Subic Bay	Philippines, Subic Bay	3:53:19	
2015/08/02	First	Ironman 70.3 Sunshine Coast	Australia, Mooloolaba, Queensland	3:46:05	
2015/08/02	Second	Ironman 70.3 Philippines Asia-Pacific Championship	Philippines, Cebu	3:46:05	
2015/06/14	Fourth	Ironman 70.3 Cairns	Australia, Queensland	3:57:55	
2015/03/22	Second	Ironman Melbourne Asia-Pacific Championship	Australia, Melbourne	8:07:56	
2015/01/18	Sixth	Challenge Melbourne	Australia, Melbourne	3:54:06	
2015/01/18	Sixteenth	Ironman New Zealand 70.3 Asia-Pacific Championship	New Zealand, Auckland	4:15:18	
2014/12/06	Tenth	Challenge Bahrain	Bahrain, Manama	3:47:01	
2014/10/12	Seventh	Ironman World Championship	United States, Kona, Hawaii	8:23:26	
2014/08/10	Fifth	Ironman 70.3 European Championship	Germany, Wiesbaden, Germany	4:10:07	
2014/07/06	Second	Ironman Cairns	Australia, Cairns, Queensland	8:23:23	
2014/03/05	First	Ironman 70.3 Busselton	Australia, Busselton, Western Australia	3:43:07	New course record
2014/01/03	Fourth	Ironman New Zealand	New Zealand, Taupō, New Zealand	8:29:53	
2014/01/02	First	Challenge Melbourne	Australia, Melbourne	3:52:37	
2014/01/19	Twelfth	Ironman Auckland 70.3 Asia Pacific Championship	New Zealand, Taupō, New Zealand	3:52:21	
2013/11/10	Second	Ironman 70.3 Australian Championship	Australia, Busselton, Western Australia	3:44:31	
2013/10/20	Fourth	Ironman 70.3 Port Macquarie	Australia, Port Macquarie, New South Wales	4:01:45	
2013/08/31	Second	Metaman	Indonesia, Bintan Island	8:42:12	
2013/08/18	Second	Ironman 70.3 Yeppoon	Australia, Yeppoon, Queensland	3:59:48	
2013/09/06	Second	Ironman Cairns	Australia, Cairns, Queensland	8:22:16	
2013/02/06	Sixth	Coral Coast Triathlon 5150	Australia, Cairns, Queensland	1:50:09	
2013/04/21	Eighth	Ironman 70.3 New Orleans	United States, New Orleans	3:53:48	
2013/07/04	Second	Ironman 70.3 Texas	United States, Galveston, Texas	3:51:35	
2013/10/02	Sixth	Urban – Long Course Geelong Triathlon Festival	Australia, Geelong, Victoria	3:54:27	
2012/10/28	Second	Port Macquarie 70.3	Australia, Port Macquarie, New South Wales	3:54:45	
2012/10/21	First	Ironman 70.3 Mandurah	Australia, Mandurah, Western Australia	3:39:59	
2012/07/10	Second	ULTIMATE – FORSTER	Australia, Forster, New South Wales	4:43:43	
2012/04/26	Second	Ironman 70.3 Japan	Japan, Tokoname, Aichi	4:03:42	
2012/06/05	Second	Ironman Australia	Australia, Port Macquarie, New South Wales	8:21:11	
2012/12/02	Third	Geelong Long Course	Australia, Geelong, Victoria	3:39:59	
2012/01/09	Second	O2 Creation Triport Festival	Australia, Goondiwindi, Queensland	4:11:02	
2012/07/01	Third	Port of Tauranga Half Ironman	New Zealand, Tauranga	4:01:28	
2011/09/10	Fourth	REVOLUTION3 Triathlon	United States, Anderson, South Carolina	3:57:53	
2011/09/25	Third	ESI Augusta Ironman 70.3	United States, Augusta, Georgia	3:51:54	
2011/11/09	Eighth	Ironman World Championship 70.3	United States, Henderson, Nevada	4:02:01	
2011/08/14	First	Challenge Copenhagen	Denmark, Copenhagen, Denmark	8:11:15	Successfully defended his title
2011/07/13	Second	Ironman 70.3 Racine	United States, Racine, Wisconsin	3:57:32	
2011/05/06	Third	Challenge Cairns	Australia, Cairns, Queensland	8:29:20	
2011/07/05	First	Ironman 70.3 Busselton	Australia, Busselton, Western Australia	3:51:27	
2011/01/05	Second	Ironman 70.3 Port Macquarie	Australia, Port Macquarie, New South Wales	4:01:40	
2011/03/04	First	NISSAN/BRW Corporate Triathlon – Team DAIKIN	Australia, Sydney	0:27:15	
2011/10/04	Second	Triathlon Queensland Olympic Distance Championships	Australia, Brisbane, Queensland		
2010/08/15	First	Challenge Copenhagen	Denmark, Copenhagen, Denmark	8:07:39	
2010/11/07	Second	Ironman 70.3 Rhode Island	Australia, Providence, Rhode Island	4:02:05	
2010/11/04	Second	SiS Half Ironman Port Macquarie	Australia, Port Macquarie, New South Wales	4:04:20	
2010/12/06	Third	Ironman 70.3 Boise	United States, Boise, Idaho	4:08:08	
2010/06/06	Fourth	Ironman 70.3 Mooseman	United States, Newfound Lake, New Hampshire	4:06:23	
2010/01/05	Third	Busselton Half Ironman	Australia, Busselton, Western Australia	3:51:59	
2010/03/28	Seventh	Ironman Australia	Australia, Port Macquarie, New South Wales	8:40:46	
2010/02/21	Sixth	Australia Long Course Championship	Australia, New South Wales	3:43:06	
2010/06/02	Third	Ironman 70.3 Geelong	Australia, Geelong, Victoria	3:56:10	
2010/09/01	Third	Port of Tauranga Half Ironman	New Zealand, Tauranga, New Zealand	3:58:40	
2009/11/15	Second	Shepparton Half Ironman	Australia, Shepparton, Victoria	3:52:29	
2009/01/11	First	Port Macquarie Half Ironman	Australia, Port Macquarie, New South Wales	4:00:38	
2009/04/10	Second	Gold Coast Half Ironman	Australia, Gold Coast, Queensland	3:56:23	
2009	First	Port Douglas Long Course	Australia, Port Douglas, Queensland		
2009	Second	10th Anniversary Capricorn Resort Half Ironman	Australia, Yeppoon, Queensland	4:04:24	
2009/05/16	Tenth	Ironman 70.3 Florida	United States, Orlando, Florida	4:03:41	
2009/05/04	Third	Ironman Australia	Australia, Port Macquarie, New South Wales	8:31:43	
2008/07/12	First	Ironman Western Australia	Australia, Busselton, Western Australia	8:07:06	
2008	First	Avanti Reef & Rainforest Triathlon	Australia, Port Douglas, Queensland		
2008/02/24	Second	Australia Long Course Champs	Australia, Huskisson, New South Wales	3:44:01	
2008	First	Port Douglas Long Course	Australia, Port Douglas, Queensland		
2008/05/10	Second	Gold Coast Half Ironman	Australia, Gold Coast, Queensland	4:00:06	
2008/09/11	Second	Port Macquarie Half Ironman	Australia, Port Macquarie, New South Wales	4:02:31	
2008/10/19	Second	New South Wales Long Course Championships	Australia, Forster, New South Wales	2:52:57	
2008/06/04	Fourth	Ironman Australia	Australia, Port Macquarie, New South Wales	8:44:20	
2008/07/13	Fifth	Ironman 70.3 Rhode Island	United States, Providence, Rhode Island	4:01:08	
2008/08/05	Sixth	Ironman 70.3 Eagleman	United States, Cambridge, Maryland	4:06:38	
2008/07/20	Seventh	Ironman 70.3 Vineman	United States, Sonoma County, California	3:59:42	
2008/07/09	Eighth	Ironman 70.3 Singapore	Singapore	4:09:06	
2008/09/02	Ninth	Ironman 70.3 Geelong	Australia, Geelong, Victoria	4:08:21	
2007/11/18	First	Shepparton Triathlons	Australia, Shepparton, Victoria	3:58:36	
2007/04/11	Fourth	Port Macquarie Half Ironman	Australia, Port Macquarie, New South Wales	4:08:25	
2007/11/30	Second	Cannibal Gold Coast Half Ironman	Australia, Gold Coast, Queensland	4:08:25	
2007	Fourth	Airlie Beach Triathlon	Australia, Queensland		
2007/03/06	Tenth	Ironman 70.3 Switzerland	Switzerland	4:01:40	
2007	Twenty-ninth	Italian Olympic Distance Championship	Italy		
2007/06/23	Fifth	Ironman Switzerland	Switzerland	8:49:09	
2007/01/04	Seventh	Ironman Australia	Australia, Port Macquarie, New South Wales	8:57:12	
2007/02/25	Fifth	Huskisson Australia Long Course Champions Pro	Australia, Huskisson, New South Wales	3:42:35	
2006/03/12	Seventh	Laguna Phuket Pro	Thailand, Phuket		
2006/01/10	Third	Cannibal Gold Coast Half Ironman, Pro	Australia, Gold Coast, Queensland	4:03:25	
2006	Fourth	Rydges Capricorn Australian Half Ironman Series, Pro	Australia, Queensland		
2006/06/05	Seventh	Busselton Half Ironman, Pro	Australia, Busselton, Western Australia	4:04:51	
2006	Third	Airlie Beach Triathlon	Australia, Queensland		
2006	Second	Camden Haven Triathlon	Australia, New South Wales		
2006	First	Victorian Olympic Distance Championships U23 Elite	Australia, Geelong, Victoria		
2006	Tenth	Australian Long Course Championships, Pro	Australia, Huskisson, New South Wales		
2006	First	Dean St Duathlon Open	Australia, Albury		
2005	First	Yackandanda Triathlon, Open Male	Australia, Yackandandah, Victoria		
2005	Third	Busselton Half Ironman, Pro	Australia, Busselton, Western Australia		
2005/11/12	Fourth	Canberra Half Ironman	Australia, Canberra, ACT	4:27:05	
2005/10/23	Ninth	Port Maquarie Half Ironman	Australia, Port Macquarie, New South Wales	4:17:21	
2005	Second	Victorian Olympic Distance Championships, U23 Elite	Australia, Elwood, Victoria		
2005	Ninth	World Age Group Championships, 20–24 yr	United States, Hawaii		
2004	Third	Victorian Sprint Distance Championships, Junior Elite	Australia, Brighton, Victoria		
2004	Third	Australian Olympic Distance Championships,16–19 AG	Australia, Mooloolaba, Queensland		
2004	Second	Australian Duathlon Championships, 20–24 AG	Australia, Benalla, Victoria		
2004/02/29	First	Yackandandah Triathlon, Open Male	Australia, Yackandandah, Victoria		
2004	First	Nail Can Hill Ironman (2003 & 2004) Open	Australia, Albury		
