= Ruedi Wild =

Swiss triathlete

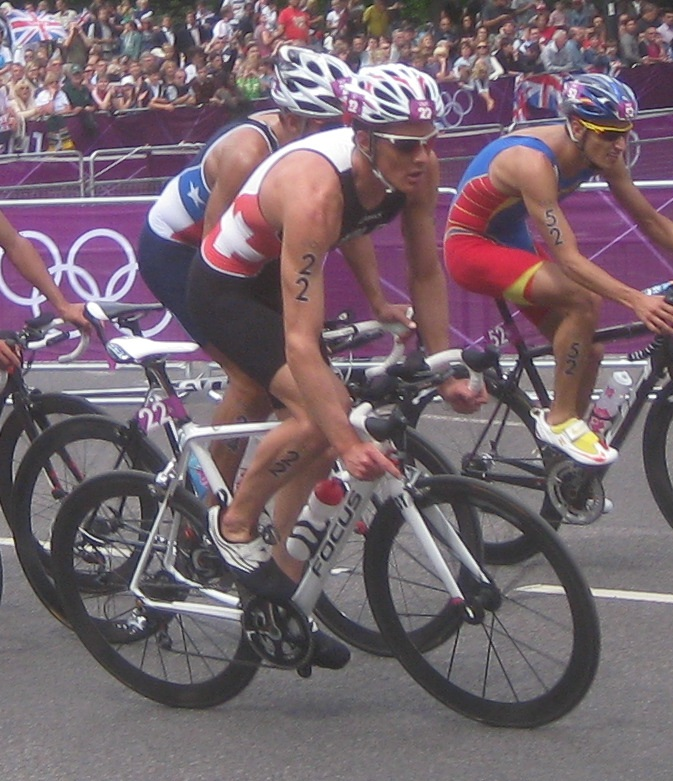
- Ruedi Wild at the 2012 Summer Olympics.

Personal information
- Born: 3 April 1982 (age 44)

Sport
- Country: Switzerland
- Sport: Triathlon
Medal record
Men's Triathlon
Representing Switzerland
ITU Long Distance Triathlon World Championships
Silver medal – second place	2018	Individual

Ruedi Wild (born 3 April 1982) is a Swiss triathlete.

At the 2012 Summer Olympics men's triathlon on Tuesday 7 August, he placed 39th.
