= Jeff Symonds =

Canadian triathlete

Personal information
- Full name: Jeffrey Bruce Symonds
- Nickname: Diamond
- Born: October 1, 1985 (age 40)
- Height: 1.83 m (6 ft 0 in)

Sport
- Country: Canada
Medal record
Men's triathlon
Representing Canada
Ironman 70.3 World Championship
Bronze medal – third place	2011 Las Vegas	Elite

Jeffrey Bruce Symonds (born October 1, 1985) is a Canadian professional triathlete. His third-place in the 2011 Ironman 70.3 World Championship made him the first Canadian male and the second man in his twenties (after Terenzo Bozzone) to record a podium finish at the Ironman 70.3 World Championships. Symonds won the 2015 Ironman Asia-Pacific Championship in Melbourne, and the 2013 and 2014 Challenge Penticton triathlons, with second-place finishes at Ironman Canada in 2014 and 2018.

Symonds trains in his hometown of Penticton, British Columbia and Vancouver, British Columbia

Symonds is now a teacher at Princess Margaret Secondary School

== Early life ==
Symonds was born and raised in Penticton, British Columbia. As he was growing up, he enjoyed playing school sports like basketball and hockey. This was around the time when he got immersed in triathlon due to the popular Ironman Canada race being held in his hometown. In 2005, Symonds participated in his first triathlon race. From that point on, he realized that he wanted to compete professionally.

== Career ==
Even though Symonds did not start participating in triathlons until he was 20, he was a runner for the University of British Columbia in college, where he obtained a bachelor's degree in commerce, with a concentration in marketing.

=== Notable results ===
- 2018 Ironman Canada (Whistler) - 2nd
- 2015 Ironman Asia-Pacific Championship Melbourne - 1st - 2:44 marathon
- 2014 Challenge Penticton – 1st - 3 weeks after Ironman Canada (Whistler) - 2:50 marathon
- 2014 Challenge Bahrain - 7th
- 2014 Ironman Canada (Whistler) – 2nd - 2:40:34 marathon
- 2013 Challenge Penticton – 1st - bike crash going 60+km/h - 2:47 marathon
- 2013 Ironman Los Cabos – 4th - debut Ironman distance race - 2:54 marathon
- 2012 Ironman 70.3 Austin – 4th
- 2012 Ironman 70.3 World Championship – 15th
- 2012 Ironman 70.3 Calgary – 3rd
- 2011 Ironman 70.3 World Championship – 3rd
- 2011 Ironman 70.3 Boise – 3rd
- 2011 Ironman 70.3 Lake Stevens – 3rd
- 2010 Ironman 70.3 World Championship – 10th
- 2010 Ironman 70.3 Lake Stevens – 2nd
- 2009 Ironman 70.3 World Championship – 33rd
- 2011 - 2014 Great White North Triathlon - 1st - new course record set in 2013 at 3:46:01
