= Aliaksandr Vasilievič =

Belarusian businessman and political prisoner

Aliaksandr (Saša) Vasilievič (Belarusian: Аляксандар (Саша) Васілевіч, also known as Aliaksandr Vasilevich; born 14 September 1974) is a Belarusian businessman, gallerist, publisher, opposition activist, and a former political prisoner.

== Career and imprisonment ==
Vasilievič is a co-founder of the online media outlets kyky.org and The Village Belarus, owner of the Vondel/Hepta agency and a former owner of the Ў Gallery of Contemporary Art.

On 28 July 2020 Vasilievič was detained by police in the KGB building in Minsk, after he tried to file a petition requesting the release on bail of the arrested presidential nominee Viktar Babaryka. The court of the Frunzienski district of Minsk sentenced Vasilievič to 14 days of administrative detention for his alleged participation in an unauthorized protest and chanting outside the KGB building ‘Freedom to Babaryka!’

On 28 August 2020 Vasilievič was detained by officers of the Department for Financial Investigations of the Committee of State Control. Prior to that, his apartment, office and the companies he managed had been searched. Like a number of other socio-political media outlets, the Village Belarus website was blocked by the Ministry of Information.

On 4 September 2020 Vasilievič was formally charged. Due to a non-disclosure agreement signed by his lawyer, it was unknown what charge the businessman was facing. Nevertheless, several media announced that Vasilievič was charged with tax evasion.

On 7 September 2020 Vasilievič was declared political prisoner by human rights organisations which explained that:

“The arrest of Aliaksandr Vasilevich […] is a continuation of the wave of repression that was triggered by the calling of the presidential election by the parliament in early May. […] The repression intensified in the post-election period, leading to a sharp increase in the number of people detained and arrested for political reasons. […] Given these circumstances, we conclude that the real grounds for the criminal prosecution […] are political motives aimed at terminating or decreasing their public activities.”

On 10 October 2020 Vasilievič was present in the KGB pre-trial detention centre at a meeting of Lukashenka with his main political opponents.

After a year and five months in custody, on 4 February 2022, the court declared Vasilievič guilty and sentenced him to three years in a corrective labor colony. He was released in the courtroom due to the expiry of the period of prosecution. Five months after his release, the businessman left Belarus.

== Family ==
Vasilievič is married to Nadzeya Zeliankova who is also a suspect in Vasilievič's criminal case. They have two children. The younger, Uršulia, was born during her father's detention. The family was forced into exile.
