= Helle Frederiksen =

Danish professional triathlete

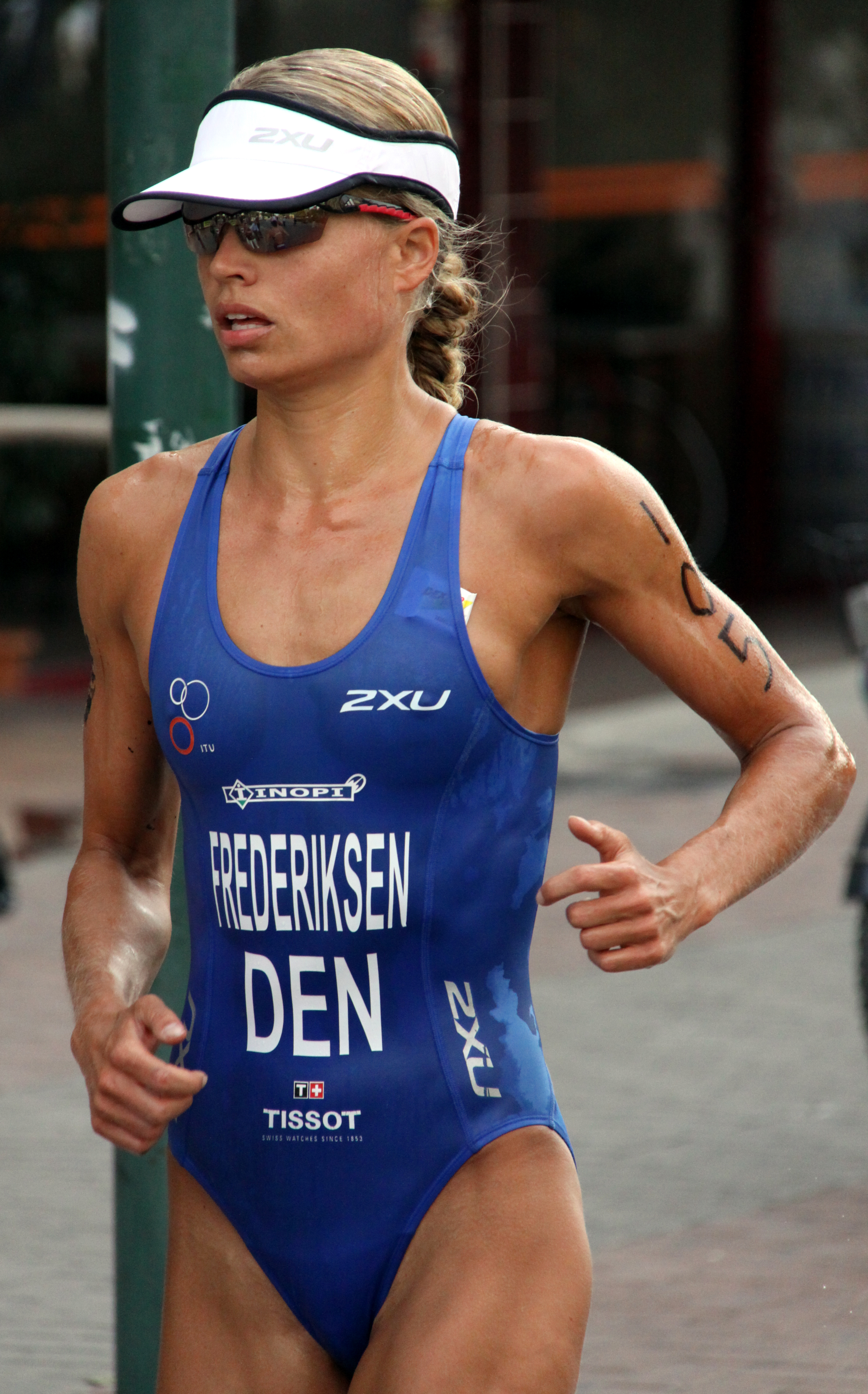
- Helle Frederiksen on her way to the silver medal at the Premium European Cup in Alanya, 2009.

Personal information
- Full name: Helle Houmann Frederiksen
- Nationality: Danish
- Born: March 5, 1981 (age 45) Odense, Funen
- Height: 1.71 m (5 ft 7 in)
- Weight: 53 kg (117 lb)
- Website: www.hellefrederiksen.com

Sport
- Team: Uplace-BMC Pro Triathlon Team
- Coached by: Joel Filliol

Achievements and titles
- Olympic finals: 27th Place, London 2012 Olympics
- Personal best(s): 3:55:50 Current World Best (1.9km, 90km, 21.1km)
Medal record
Representing Denmark
Women's triathlon
ITU Long Distance World Championships
Gold medal – first place	2018	Individual
Silver medal – second place	2017	Individual

Helle Frederiksen (born 5 March 1981 in Odense, Funen) is a Danish professional triathlete. She represented Denmark in triathlon at the 2012 Summer Olympics, placing 27th, and raced on International Triathlon Union race circuit. She is the winner of the 2018 ITU Long Distance Triathlon World Championships as well as the 2014 Hy-Vee Triathlon and 2014 Challenge Bahrain.

== Career ==
Frederiksen was a swimmer from the age of 12 to 18 and a member of the national Danish swimming squad. She had won several Danish championships when, in 1999, she decided to retire from elite sports.

Frederiksen studied at Syddansk Universitet an earned a bachelor's degree in sports (Idræt og Sundhed, 2005) and after having moved to Farum she studied for a master's degree in Physical Education and Nutrition (Cand. Scient. i Human Ernæring, 2008) at the University of Copenhagen.

Having worked as a spinning trainer for five years, she missed her former life as an elite sportswoman and in 2004 she took part in, and won, a women's triathlon (Piger med Power) in Odense, and in 2005, at the Danish Championships, she placed second in the Sprint and third in the Olympic Distance. In 2006, an intensive training period on the Gold Coast in Australia was worth the effort, and Frederiksen won the Danish Championships at the Olympic Distance. For 4 consecutive years, from 2006 to 2009, she was the Danish Triathlon Champion. In 2010, however, due to a flat tyre in the bike stage, she could not finish the National Championships in Nykøbing Falster.

In 2010, Frederiksen suffered a mixture of misfortunes. Since her bicycle crash at the World Championship Series event in Madrid, she suffered from a hip and back injury and later a spinal disc prolapse dating back to 2007 started to cause pains again. On the other hand, Helle Frederiksen was awarded an Olympic Scholarship for Athletes London 2012 and competed at the 2012 Olympic Games, finishing in 27th place.

=== ITU competitions ===
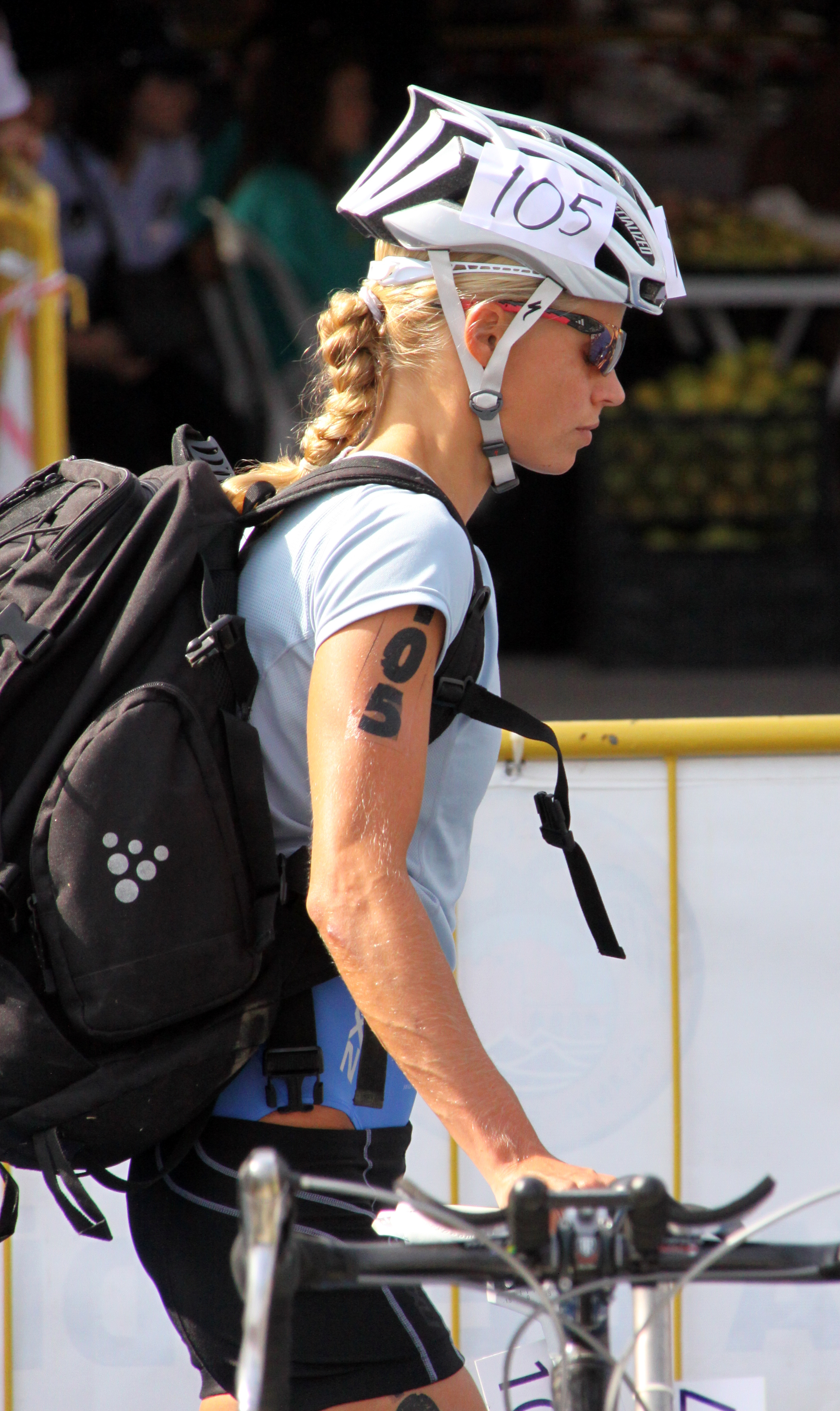
Helle Frederiksen checking in at the Premium European Cup in Alanya, 2009.

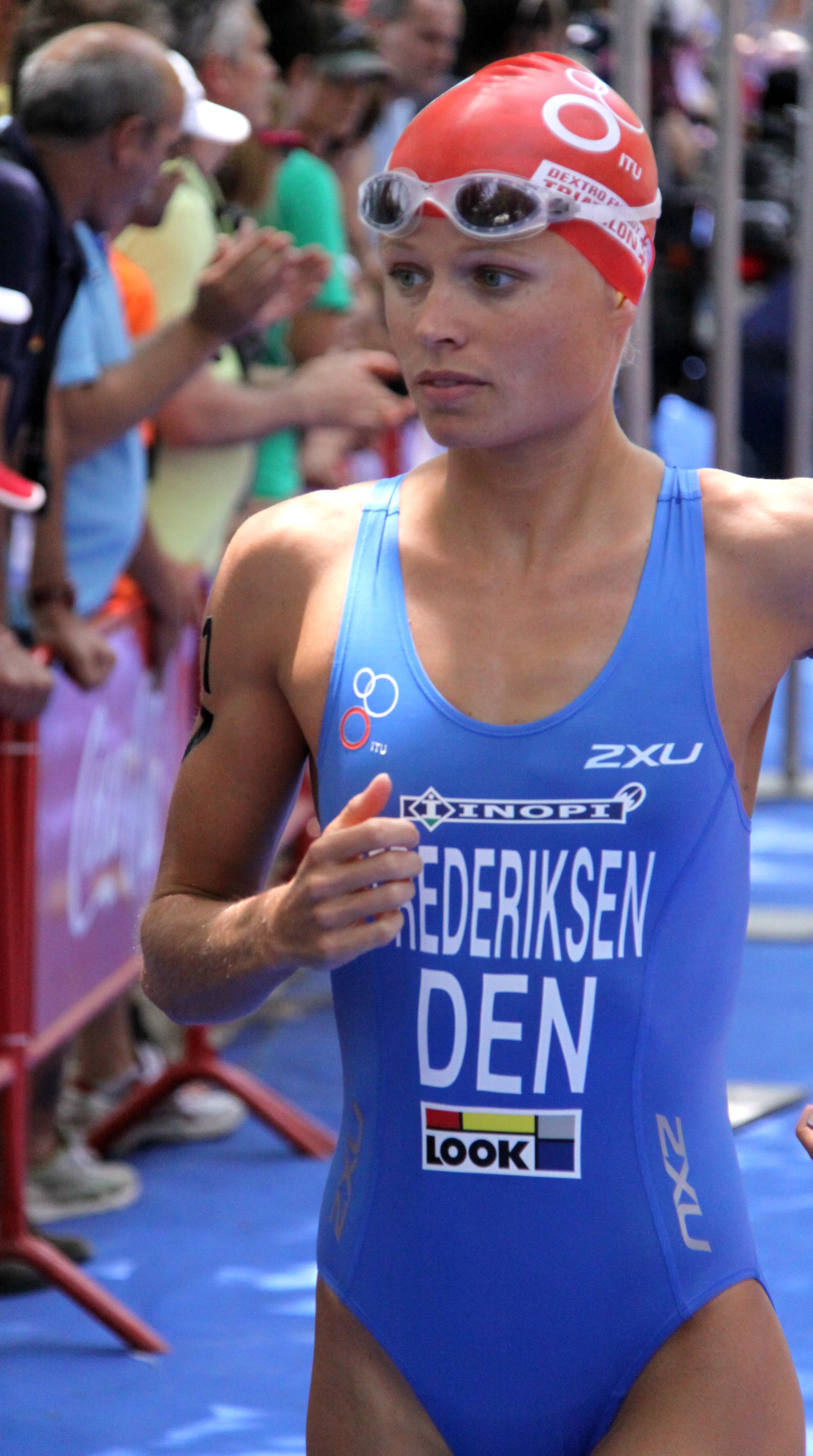
Helle Frederiksen at the World Championships Series triathlon in Madrid, 2010.

In the five years from 2006 to 2010, Helle Frederiksen took part in 36 ITU competitions and achieved 18 top ten positions, among which 10 medals.

Results list

Date	Competition	Place	Rank
2006-07-15	Premium European Cup	Holten	10
2006-08-20	European Cup	Geneva	9
2006-09-10	World Cup	Hamburg	57
2006-09-17	Premium European Cup	Kedzierzyn Kozle	DNF
2007-05-06	World Cup	Lisbon	DNF
2007-05-20	Premium European Cup	Sanremo	8
2007-06-30	European Championships	Copenhagen	DNF
2007-07-07	Premium European Cup	Holten	12
2007-07-22	World Cup	Kitzbühel	38
2007-08-05	European Cup	Egirdir	3
2007-08-11	World Cup	Tiszaújváros	31
2007-09-01	World Championships	Hamburg	52
2007-09-09	Premium European Cup	Kedzierzyn Kozle	13
2008-07-13	World Cup	Tiszaújváros	5
2008-07-27	Premium European Cup	Poznan	1
2008-08-10	European Cup	Carlsbad (Karlovy Vary)	1
2008-08-30	European Cup	Split	1
2008-09-13	European Cup	Vienna	4
2009-04-05	European Cup	Quarteira	3
2009-05-02	World Championship Series	Tongyeong	21
2009-06-14	European and American Cup · Ibero-American Championships	Ferrol	1
2009-07-05	European Championships	Holten	9
2009-07-12	World Championship Series	Kitzbühel	DNF
2009-08-09	World Cup	Tiszaújváros	9
2009-08-15	World Championship Series	London	DNF
2009-09-26	European Cup	Mar Menor	1
2009-10-25	Premium European Cup	Alanya	2
2009-11-08	World Cup	Huatulco	2
2009-11-21	Premium European Cup	Eilat	2
2010-05-08	World Championship Series	Seoul	17
2010-06-05	World Championship Series	Madrid	DNF
2010-07-03	European Championships	Athlone	22
2010-07-10	World Cup	Holten	15
2010-08-08	World Cup	Tiszaújváros	7
2010-08-14	World Championship Series	Kitzbuhel	DNF
2010-09-08	World Championship Series	Budapest	DNF

DNS = did not start · DNF = did not finish

== Personal life ==
Helle Frederiksen and the Welsh triathlete Ben Powell, former member of the Swansea High Performance Squad and son of the former Welsh Ironman record holder Martin Powell, are a couple. Ben Powell works at the triathlon high performance centre Club LaSanta in Lanzarote where Helle Frederiksen spends her training period.
