= Anders Christensen =

Danish handball player (born 1985)

Personal information
- Full name: Anders Christensen
- Nationality: Danish (Denmark)
- Born: 21 October 1985 (age 40) Værløse, Denmark
- Height: 1.91 m (6 ft 3 in)

Sport
- Sport: Handball
- Position: Right winger
- Current club: Retired
- Number: 10

Youth career
- Years: Team
- –: Frederiksberg IF
- –: FCK Håndbold

Senior clubs
- Years: Team
- –2011: FCK Håndbold
- 2011–2013: Nordsjælland Håndbold
National team
Years	Team	Apps	(Gls)
2007–2009	Denmark	9	(21)

Anders Christensen (born 21 October 1985) is a Danish former handball player, who played for Danish Handball League sides FCK Håndbold, Frederiksberg IF and Nordsjælland Håndbold. With FC København he won the Danish Championship in 2008.

He has made 9 appearances for the Danish national handball team.

He retired in 2013 to pursue a civil career.
