= Marko Albert =

Estonian triathlete (born 1979)

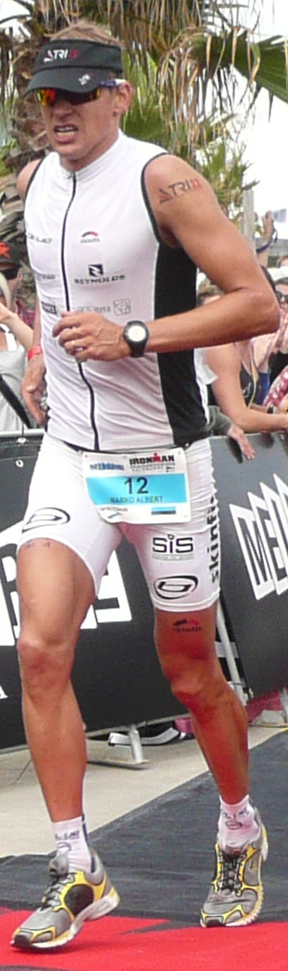
- Marko Albert at the Melbourne Ironman on March 25, 2012, finishing 9th

Personal information
- Born: 25 June 1979 (age 47) Tallinn, then part of Estonian SSR, Soviet Union
- Height: 1.89 m (6 ft 2 in)
- Weight: 78 kg (172 lb)

Sport
- Country: Estonia
- Club: Triatloniklubi 21.CC
- Coached by: Jüri Käen
Medal record
Men's Triathlon
Representing Estonia
ITU Long Distance Triathlon World Championships
Bronze medal – third place	2018	Individual

Marko Albert (born 25 June 1979) is a former Estonian triathlete. Albert started his sporting career as swimmer and switched to triathlon in 1997. He is coached by Jüri Käen.

Albert is 1.89 m (6 ft 2 in) tall and weighs 78 kg (172 lb).

== Achievements ==
Albert has twice finished second in International Triathlon Union World Cup: Rio de Janeiro in 2004 and New Plymouth in 2006. He has also been total six times in TOP 10 in ITU World Cup. He competed in two Olympic Games triathlons 2004 Athens 21st place and 2008 Beijing 41st place. Latest best result is 2014 Ironman New Zealand where he got first place in front of Cameron Brown and Terenzo Bozzone. He has also won Ironman 70.3 Racine and Ironman 70.3 Victoria. His best Ironman time is 8:04:08. Marko is one of the best swimmers in long course triathlon.

Albert is also an experienced triathlon coach holding 5th category coach qualification.

== Notable results ==
Some of Albert's notable achievements include:

Date	Event	Place
2018	Ironman Tallinn	3
2018	ITU Long Course World Championships Odense	3
2017	Ironman European Championships Frankfurt	7
2017	Ironman 70.3 Victoria	1
2017	Ironman New Zealand	4
2016	Ironman World Championship	14
2016	Ironman European Championship Frankfurt	4
2016	Ironman African Championship South Africa	3
2014	Ironman New Zealand	1
2014	Ironman Austria	5
2014	Ironman 70.3 South Africa	10
2014	Ironman 70.3 Italy	7
2013	Ironman New Zealand	2
2013	Ironman 70.3 Geelong	7
2013	Ironman 70.3 South Africa	4
2012	Ironman 70.3 Racine	1
2012	Ironman New Zealand	6
2012	Ironman Melbourne	9
2011	Ironman World Championships	13
2011	Ironman Austria	3
2011	Ironman 70.3 US Open Championships, Galveston	6
2010	Ironman 70.3 Austin	2
2009	Ironman 70.3 St Pölten	4
