= Cynthia Wilson =

Barbadian educator, performer and writer (born 1934)

Cynthia Wilson (born 16 June 1934) is a Barbadian educator, performer and writer.

== Life and career ==
Wilson was born in Saint Philip on 16 June 1934, and educated at the University College of the West Indies. She taught English at high schools in Jamaica and Morocco. Wilson returned to Barbados in 1969 and worked for the Ministry of Foreign Affairs and the Caribbean Tourism Research Centre. In 1973, she helped establish the National Independence Festival of Creative Arts. Wilson was a founding member of Stage One Theatre Productions, also serving as its president. She has been manager of the Barbados Dance Theatre Company and chair of the Association of Caribbean Theatre Artists. She has produced numerous dance, musical and theater productions and has performed as an actor and as a dancer. Cynthia Wilson's first book, a collection of short stories entitled Same Sea ... Another Wave, was published in 2001.

== Selected works ==
- Same Sea ... Another Wave, short stories
- Whispering of the Trees, novel
