= Terenzo Bozzone =

New Zealand triathlete (born 1985)

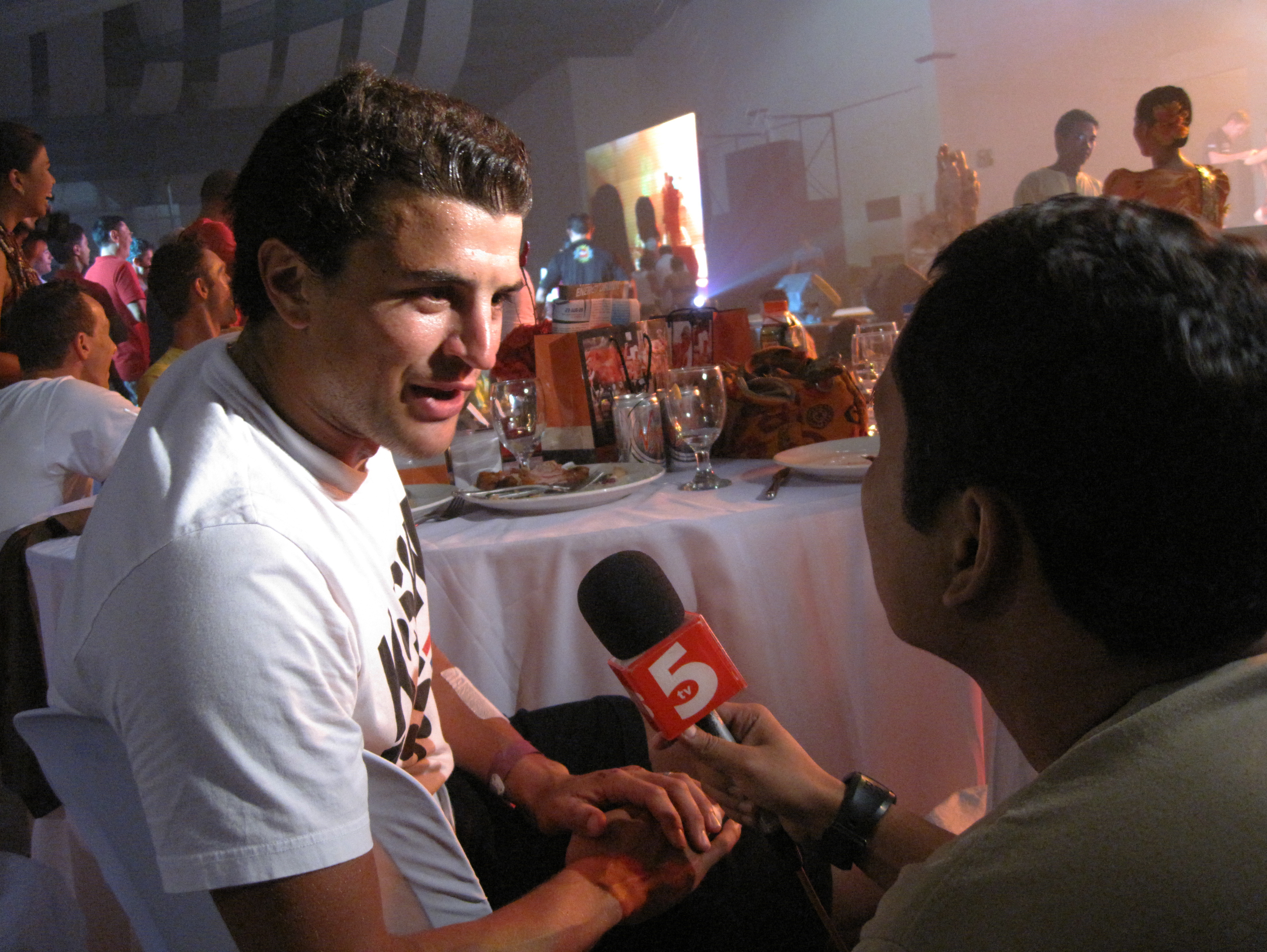
- Bozzone being interviewed in the Philippines in 2009

Personal information
- Born: 1 March 1985 (age 41) South Africa

Sport
- Country: New Zealand
- Sport: Triathlon
Medal record
Men's triathlon
Representing New Zealand
Men's triathlon
Ironman 70.3
Gold medal – first place	2008	Elite
Silver medal – second place	2013	Elite
Men's athletics
Oceania Championships
Silver medal – second place	2002 Christchurch	5000 m

Terenzo Bozzone (born 1 March 1985) is a professional triathlete from New Zealand who races primarily in long distance, non-drafting events. He is the winner of the 2008 Ironman 70.3 World Championship.

== Athletic career ==
Bozzone was born in South Africa and moved to New Zealand with his family as a young boy. He was a talented athlete at school winning many national titles in a variety of disciplines including cross country running, cycling, swimming and multisport. After finishing school he focused on multisport and won the 2001 & 2002 Junior Men's Elite Duathlon World Championship and the 2002 & 2003 Junior Men's Elite Triathlon World Championship.

Bozzone holds the current course record for the Wildflower Triathlon set in 2006. Bozzone completed the half-Ironman distance in 3 hours, 53 minutes and 43 seconds, beating the previous record by 6 minutes.

In 2008, Bozzone capped off a successful year by winning the Ironman 70.3 World Championships in Clearwater, Florida setting a then course record of 3:40:10. Bozzone then spent the next couple of years battling an Achilles tendon injury. In 2013, he capped off a good season of racing with a second-place finish at 2013 Ironman 70.3 World Championships.

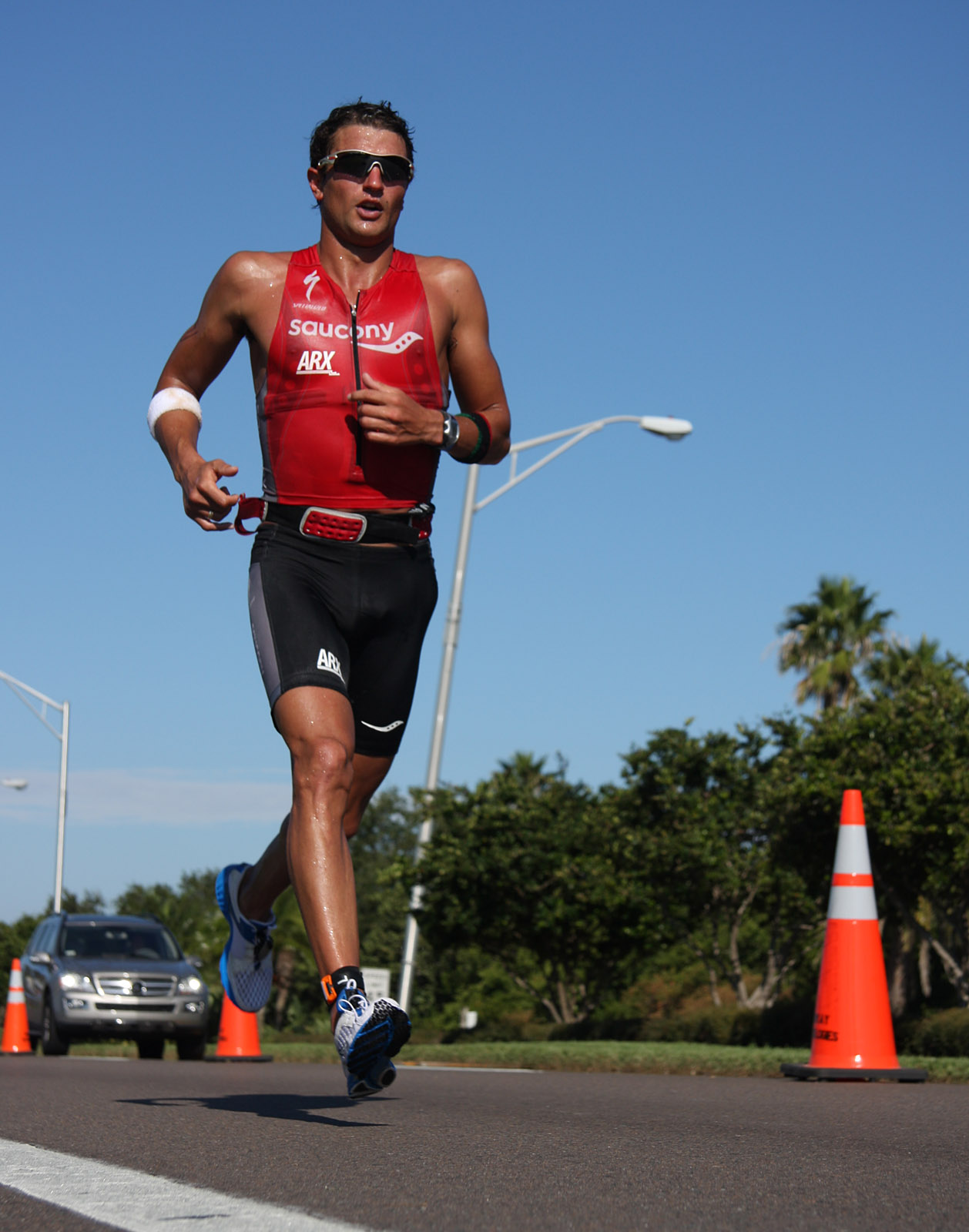
Terenzo Bozzone, at the 2008 Ironman 70.3 World Championships

== Injury ==
On 3 July 2018, Bozzone was seriously injured when he was hit by a truck while cycling near Kumeū. He was rushed to Auckland City Hospital in a serious condition. Bozzone suffered face and head injuries and was concussed as a result of the crash.

== Achievements in other sports ==
He also represented his country successfully in athletics, winning the silver medal in the 5000 metres race at the 2002 Oceania Championships in Christchurch in a time of 15:05.80 minutes.
