= Mario Huys =

Belgian triathlete

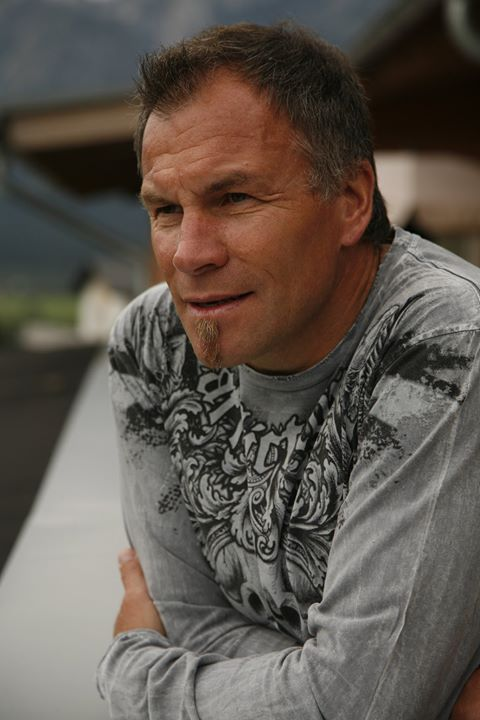

Personal information
- Born: 9 February 1959 (age 67) Bruges, Belgium
Medal record
Representing Belgium
Men's triathlon

Mario Huys (born 9 February 1959) is a former professional triathlete from Belgium who is currently living in Austria. He is the head coach and managing director of Mario Huys Coaching. Huys holds a master's degree in sports science. He is a former coach of the Oakley Transition Ironman Team and founding member of Triangel Institut, Ironman Nice and Ironman 70.3 Monaco.

== Athletic career highlights ==
- Former world record holder for double Ironman 19:54 (two Ironman races consecutively, both under 10 hours)
- Coached two pro triathletes to each break the world record (Luc Van Lierde and Yvonne van Vlerken)
- Completed 18 Ironman branded races as well as 24 Ironman distance triathlons for a total of 42 Ironman finishes
- Won 11 Long distance races
- Vice European Champion Ironman Distance Köln 1985
- Ironman personal best time 8:19
- Best finish at the Ironman World Championships - 11th place
- Ironman Hawaii best time 8:48
- Marathon personal best 2:28
- Member of Belgian Olympic rowing team
- Professional triathlete for 14 years
- Semi-professional cyclist for two years by ADR Greg LeMond’s team
- Skiing instructor, mountain guide, rafting guide, canyoning guide and paraglider

== Coaching highlights ==
- Philippe Methion France (European and French Triathlon Champ)
- Luc Van Lierde Belgium (Hawaii Ironman Champ)
- Kate Allen Australia (Olympic gold and 2 Ironman wins)
- Daniel Hechenblaickner Austria (International Triathlon and Duathlon Champ)
- Yvonne van Vlerken Netherlands (World Duathlon and Ironman Champ)
- Manuel Wyss Switzerland (National Champ)
- Irina Kirchler Austria (National Champ, Olympic team Austria)
- Scott Ragsdale United States (7 IM in Emirates in 7 days)
- José Jeuland France (National Champ)

== Pro athletes currently coached by Huys ==
- Michael Weiss Austria (Olympian, Ironman Champ and Xterra Champ)
- Josef Fuchs Austria (World Champion FIS Masters, 2 x bronze FIS Masters and silver medallist)
- Lisa Reiss Austria (professional alpine skier)
- Dorian Wagner Germany (National Champ)
