= Ryosuke Yamamoto =

Ryosuke Yamamoto may refer to:

- Ryosuke Yamamoto (actor) (山本 涼介, born 1995), Japanese actor and model
- Ryosuke Yamamoto (triathlete) (山本 良介, born 1979), Japanese triathlete
