= Linsey Corbin =

American triathlete

Personal information
- Born: February 16, 1981 (age 45) Greenbrae, California
- Height: 5 ft 8 in (1.73 m)
- Weight: 120 lb (54 kg)

Sport
- Country: United States
- Coached by: Jesse Kropelnicki
Medal record
Representing United States
Women's triathlon
Ironman 70.3
Bronze medal – third place	2011	Individual

Linsey Corbin (born February 16, 1981) is an American triathlete who races primarily in non-drafting, long-distance events. Her career includes a third place at the 2011 Ironman 70.3 World Championship and eight Ironman race wins.

== Career ==
Corbin was born Linsey Pickell to parents Tom and Betty in Greenbrae, California, and grew up in Bend, Oregon, where she attended Mountain View High School. Corbin participated downhill ski racing, cross country and track & field. She attended UC Davis where she ran track but eventually took a break from the sport while attending college. She transferred to the University of Montana to study nutrition and exercise physiology in 2000. In Montana, Corbin began competing in triathlon and in 2003 she entered Missoula's Grizzly Triathlon and won. Three years later she set a course record for her age group at the 2006 Wildflower Triathlon. She soon after turned pro.

In 2014, after living in Missoula and working with coach Matt Dixon of Purple Patch Fitness, Corbin made changes to her approach to training and season preparation. She moved back to her home town of Bend, Oregon for the opportunity to train around more elite athletes. She also switched coaches, to Jesse Kropelnicki of QT2 Systems. In 2015, Corbin planned to race at the Ironman African Championships in March, but she was unable to start after falling ill. Blood tests later revealed that she had contracted viral and bacterial infections. After some recovery time she took 10th place at the Ironman 70.3 North American Championship in St. George in May. She attempted to race the Ironman North American Championship later that month; however, a pulled hip flexor kept her from racing. Later tests would reveal that she had a small stress fracture in her femur. The injury and the recovery time needed to heal effectively ended her 2015 season causing her to miss the Ironman World Championship for the first time since 2005.

Corbin announced that the 2022 Ironman World Championship would be her final race as a professional.

== Results ==
Corbin's notable achievements include:

- 2008: Ironman World Championships - 5th
- 2009: Ironman Arizona - 2nd
- 2010: Ironman Arizona - 2nd
- 2010: Ironman Coeur d’Alene - 1st
- 2011: Ironman 70.3 World Championships - 3rd
- 2011: Ironman 70.3 Pucón - 1st
- 2011: Ironman Arizona - 2nd
- 2012: Wildflower Triathlon - 2nd
- 2012: Ironman 70.3 Hawai'i - 1st
- 2012: Ironman 70.3 Puerto Rico - 2nd
- 2012: Ironman Arizona - 1st
- 2012: Ironman Austria - 1st
- 2013: Ironman 70.3 Mont Tremblant - 1st
- 2014: Ironman 70.3 Raleigh - 2nd
- 2014: Ironman Austria - 1st
- 2014: Ironman Los Cabos - 1st
- 2015: Ironman 70.3 St. George - 10th
- 2016: Ironman 70.3 Pan American Championships - 5th
- 2017: Ironman Canada - 1st
- 2018: Ironman Wisconsin - 1st
- 2019: Ironman 70.3 Traverse City - 2nd
- 2019: Ironman Wisconsin - 1st
- 2021: Ironman Coeur D’Alene - 3rd
- 2022: Ironman Des Moines North America Championship - 5th
