= Michael Weiss (triathlete) =

Austrian triathlete and cyclist

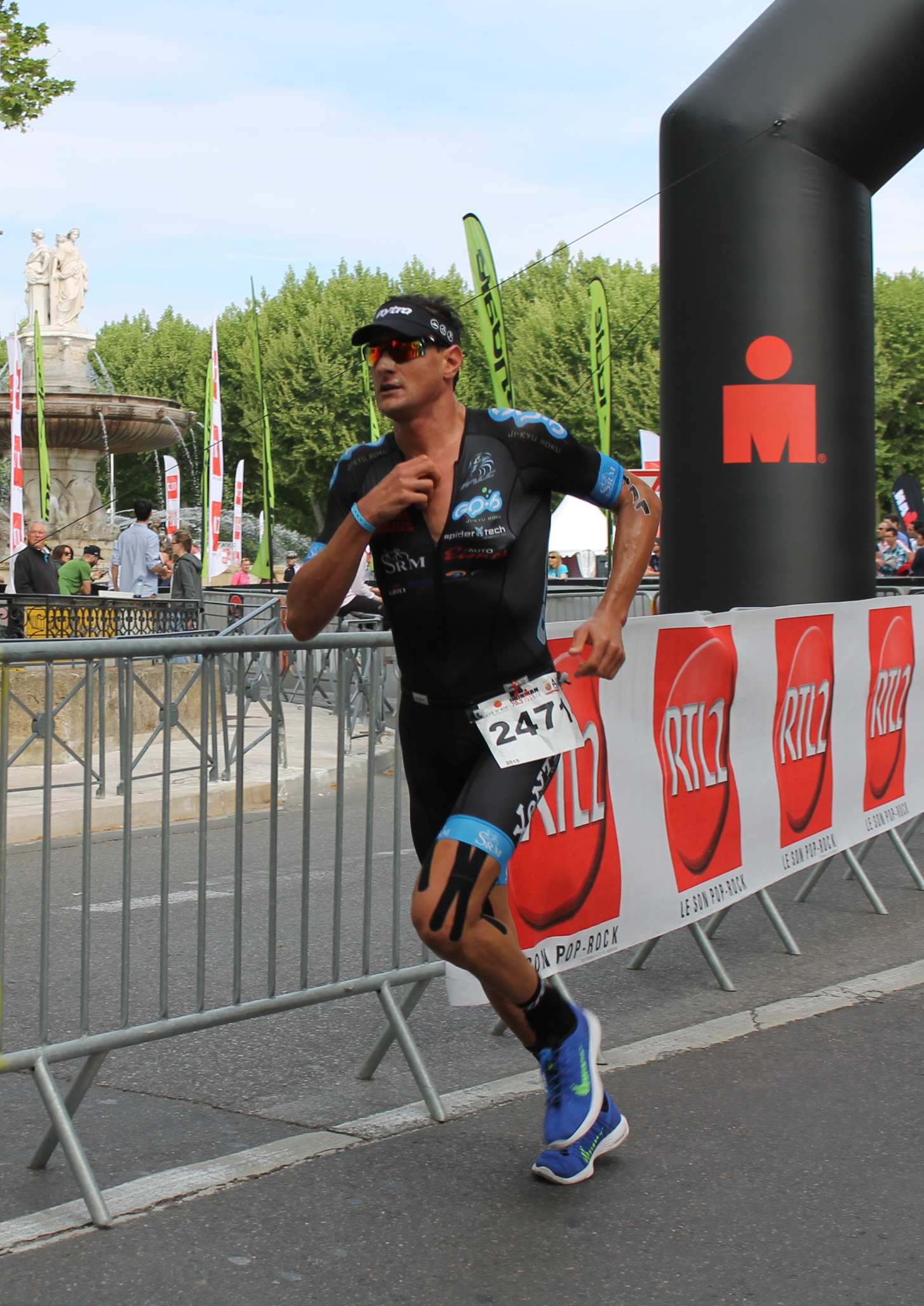

Personal information
- Nickname: Michi
- Born: 17 January 1981 (age 45) Gumpoldskirchen, Austria
- Height: 187 cm (6 ft 2 in)
- Weight: 79 kg (174 lb)

Sport
- Country: Austria
- Club: Ciclopia Triteam
- Coached by: Mario Huys
Medal record
Men's triathlon
Representing Austria
XTERRA Triathlon World Championship
Gold medal – first place	2011 XTERRA Triathlon	Elite
Silver medal – second place	2008 XTERRA Triathlon	Elite
Bronze medal – third place	2010 XTERRA Triathlon	Elite
Bronze medal – third place	2009 XTERRA Triathlon	Elite

Michael Weiss (born 17 January 1981) is an Austrian triathlete and cyclist. He represented Austria in the 2004 Summer Olympics in men's mountain bike, cross-country and is the 2011 XTERRA Triathlon world champion.

== Career ==
=== Mountain biking ===
Weiss was a member of the Austrian national mountain bike team from 1999–2008. In 2003, he won the under–23 European Mountain Bike Championships. The next year, in 2004, he became the Austrian mountain bike champion and competed in the 2004 Summer Olympic's mountain bike race where he placed 32nd with a time 2:30:14. After failing to qualify for 2008 Olympics in Beijing, Weiss eventually turned to triathlon.

=== Triathlon ===
Weiss took his skill in mountain biking and applied them to the XTERRA Triathlon series. He has had success at the championships in Maui placing second in 2008, third in 2009 and 2010 before winning the championship in 2011. In May 2010, Weiss became the first Austrian to win an Ironman competition by winning the 2010 Ironman St.George race. In 2013, in his first race after serving his two-year doping ban, Weiss won Ironman Cozumel.

== Doping ban ==
In November 2011, Weiss was given a two–year ban for a blood doping infringement in 2005 while competing in mountain biking. An independent commission of Austria's anti-doping agency (Nationale Anti-Doping Agentur Austria, NADA), said that it had found Weiss to be guilty of having his blood taken for enrichment at a blood lab in Vienna in 2005. NADA initially cleared Weiss in September 2010, but that decision was reversed a year later and subsequently issued the ban from competition. Weiss declared his innocence but chose not to appeal the ban, citing the time and expense that would be required to do so.
