= 2009 Ironman 70.3 World Championship =

The 2009 Ironman 70.3 World Championship was a triathlon competition held in Clearwater, Florida on November 14, 2009. The race was sponsored by Foster Grant and organized by the World Triathlon Corporation. The championship race is the culmination of the Ironman 70.3 series of races that take place during the 12 months prior leading up to the event. Athletes, both professional and amateur, earn a spot in the championship race by qualifying in races throughout the 70.3 series.

== Medallists ==
=== Men ===
Pos.	Time (h:mm:ss)	Name	Country	Split times (h:mm:ss)				
Pos.	Time (h:mm:ss)	Name	Country	Swim	T1	Bike	T2	Run
Gold medal	3:34:04	Michael Raelert	Germany	21:58	1:55	1:59:35	1:32	1:09:06
Silver medal	3:36:34	Daniel Fontana	Italy	21:55	1:53	1:59:30	1:27	1:12:00
Bronze medal	3:37:50	Matthew Reed	United States	21:59	2:08	1:59:09	1:25	1:13:11
4	3:38:02	Sylvain Sudrie	France	21:57	1:53	1:59:41	1:45	1:12:46
5	3:38:19	Joe Gambles	Australia	22:19	2:05	1:58:57	1:35	1:13:23
6	3:40:16	Kevin Collington	United States	22:10	2:04	2:00:32	1:58	1:13:32
7	3:40:16	Luke Bell	Australia	22:01	1:58	1:59:23	1:40	1:15:14
8	3:40:19	Alberto Casadei	Italy	22:05	2:15	1:59:12	1:44	1:15:03
9	3:40:31	Leon Griffin	Australia	22:22	1:54	1:59:08	4:42	1:12:25
10	3:41:37	Brian Fleischmann	United States	21:38	1:53	2:01:05	1:42	1:15:19

=== Women ===
Pos.	Time (h:mm:ss)	Name	Country	Split times (h:mm:ss)				
Pos.	Time (h:mm:ss)	Name	Country	Swim	T1	Bike	T2	Run
Gold medal	3:59:33	Julie Dibens	Great Britain	23:48	2:11	2:07:15	1:44	1:24:37
Silver medal	4:03:49	Mary Beth Ellis	United States	24:05	2:10	2:10:58	1:56	1:24:42
Bronze medal	4:05:27	Magali Tisseyre	Canada	25:34	2:21	2:15:17	1:45	1:20:32
4	4:05:33	Caroline Steffen	Switzerland	25:18	3:13	2:08:29	1:45	1:26:48
5	4:07:39	Laura Bennett	United States	24:03	2:13	2:17:06	1:35	1:22:42
6	4:08:17	Michellie Jones	Australia	25:35	2:06	2:15:22	1:58	1:23:16
7	4:09:34	Sarah Groff	United States	23:41	2:10	2:16:07	1:40	1:25:56
8	4:13:16	Amanda Stevens	United States	23:45	2:14	2:13:30	1:44	1:32:03
9	4:15:04	Karin Thürig	Switzerland	30:51	0:45	2:10:38	4:42	1:28:08
10	4:17:57	Vanessa Gianinni	Brazil	25:40	2:41	2:24:26	1:42	1:23:28

== Qualification ==
The 2009 Ironman 70.3 Series features 34 events that enable qualification to the 2009 World Championship event. Some 70.3 events also act as qualifiers for the full Ironman World Championships in Hawaii.

=== Qualifying Ironman 70.3s ===
Date	Event	Location
Oct 5, 2008	Ironman 70.3 Austin	Austin, TX, United States
Nov 8, 2008	Ironman 70.3 World Championship	Clearwater, FL, United States
Jan 18, 2009	Ironman 70.3 South Africa	Buffalo City, South Africa
Jan 18, 2009	Ironman 70.3 Pucón	Pucón, Chile
Feb 8, 2009	Ironman 70.3 Geelong	Geelong, Australia
Mar 22, 2009	Ironman 70.3 Singapore	Singapore
Apr 4, 2009	Ironman 70.3 California	Oceanside, CA, United States
Apr 5, 2009	Ironman 70.3 New Orleans	New Orleans, LA, United States
Apr 19, 2009	Ironman 70.3 China	Haikou, Hainan, China
May 3, 2009	Ironman 70.3 St. Croix	(United States Virgin Islands) St. Croix, US Virgin Islands
May 17, 2009	Ironman 70.3 Florida	Orlando, FL, United States
May 24, 2009	Ironman 70.3 Austria	St. Pölten/Vienna, Austria
May 30, 2009	Ironman 70.3 Hawaii	Kohala, HI, United States
Jun 7, 2009	Ironman 70.3 Switzerland	Rapperswil-Jona, Lake Zurich, Switzerland
Jun 13, 2009	Ironman 70.3 Boise	Boise, ID, United States
Jun 14, 2009	Ironman 70.3 Kansas	Lawrence, KS, United States
Jun 14, 2009	Ironman 70.3 U.K.	(United Kingdom) Wimbleball, Exmoor, UK
Jun 14, 2009	Ironman 70.3 Eagleman	Cambridge, MD, United States
Jun 28, 2009	Ironman 70.3 Buffalo Springs Lake	Lubbock, TX, United States
Jul 12, 2009	Ironman 70.3 Rhode Island	Providence, RI, United States
Jul 19, 2009	Ironman 70.3 Vineman	Sonoma County, CA, United States
Aug 1, 2009	Ironman 70.3 Steelhead	Benton Harbor, MI, United States
Aug 2, 2009	Ironman 70.3 Antwerp	Antwerp, Belgium
Aug 2, 2009	Ironman 70.3 Calgary	Calgary, AB, Canada
Aug 16, 2009	Ironman 70.3 Germany	Wiesbaden/Rheingau-Taunus-Kreis, Germany
Aug 16, 2009	Ironman 70.3 Lake Stevens	Lake Stevens, WA, United States
Aug 23, 2009	Ironman 70.3 Timberman	Gilford, NH, United States
Aug 23, 2009	Ironman 70.3 Philippines	Camarines Sur, Philippines
Aug 29, 2009	Ironman 70.3 Brazil	Penha, Brazil
Sep 6, 2009	Ironman 70.3 Monaco	Monaco
Sep 13, 2009	Ironman 70.3 Muskoka	Huntsville, Ontario, Canada
Sep 20, 2009	Ironman 70.3 Cancún	(Mexico) Cancún, Quintana Roo, MEX
Sep 27, 2009	Ironman 70.3 Augusta	Augusta, Georgia, United States
Oct 4, 2009	Ironman 70.3 Putrajaya	Putrajaya, Malaysia

=== 2009 Ironman 70.3 Series results ===
==== Men ====
Event	Gold	Time	Silver	Time	Bronze	Time	Reference
Longhorn	Richie Cunningham (AUS)	3:49:44	Joe Gambles (AUS)	3:50:40	Alberto Casadei (ITA)	3:51:49	
Clearwater	Terenzo Bozzone (NZL)	3:40:10	Andreas Raelert (GER)	3:40:42	Richie Cunningham (AUS)	3:41:47	
South Africa	Raynard Tissink (RSA)	4:02:04	Fraser Cartmell (GBR)	4:04:07	Konstantin Bachor (GER)	4:04:50	
Pucón	Oscar Galíndez (ARG)	3:57:26	Reinaldo Colucci (BRA)	3:59:21	Daniel Fontana (ITA)	4:01:53	
Geelong	Craig Alexander (AUS)	3:50:51	David Dellow (AUS)	3:53:02	Luke Bell (AUS)	3:53:52	
Singapore	Craig Alexander (AUS)	3:47:23	Chris McCormack (AUS)	3:50:41	Simon Thompson (AUS)	3:54:27	
California	Matthew Reed (USA)	3:51:50	Andy Potts (USA)	3:53:36	Ronnie Schildknecht (SUI)	3:54:14	
New Orleans	Brent McMahon (CAN)	3:52:08	Chris McCormack (AUS)	3:54:33	Tim O'Donnell (USA)	3:55:08	
China	Chris McCormack (AUS)	4:04:44	Luke McKenzie (AUS)	4:23:34	Mark Jansen (SIN)	4:38:11	
St. Croix	Tim O'Donnell (USA)	4:02:36	Igor Amorelli (BRA)	4:03:38	Richie Cunningham (AUS)	4:05:45	
Florida	Dirk Bockel (LUX)	3:54:25	Luke Bell (AUS)	3:54:28	Santiago Ascenco (BRA)	3:56:10	
Austria	Chris McCormack (AUS)	3:54:15	Marino Vanhoenacker (BEL)	3:54:18	Massimo Cigana (ITA)	3:56:22	
Hawaii	Craig Alexander (AUS)	4:02:52	Chris Lieto (USA)	4:05:34	Luke McKenzie (AUS)	4:11:58	
Switzerland	Ronnie Schildknecht (SUI)	3:54:30	Mike Aigroz (SUI)	3:56:10	Alessandro Degasperi (ITA)	3:57:47	
Boise	Craig Alexander (AUS)	3:51:46	Chris Lieto (USA)	3:51:48	Joe Gambles (AUS)	3:56:24	
Kansas	Luke Bell (AUS)	3:49:35	Tim O'Donnell (USA)	3:50:44	Paul Matthews (AUS)	3:53:20	
UK	Philip Graves (GBR)	4:15:58	Stephen Bayliss (GBR)	4:19:41	Fraser Cartmell (GBR)	4:20:37	
Eagleman	Terenzo Bozzone (NZL)	3:51:11	Richie Cunningham (USA)	3:51:27	Michael Lovato (USA)	3:56:51	
Buffalo Springs	Paul Matthews (AUS)	4:01:26	Leon Griffin (AUS)	4:03:02	Simon Thompson (AUS)	4:05:54	
Rhode Island	Michael Lovato (USA)	3:54:39	Richie Cunningham (USA)	3:54:50	Cameron Brown (NZL)	3:54:53	
Vineman	Joe Gambles (AUS)	3:49:18	Simon Thompson (AUS)	3:53:38	Leon Griffin (AUS)	3:57:01	
Steelhead	Andy Potts (USA)	3:54:38	Andrew Starykowicz (USA)	3:56:44	Kieran Doe (NZL)	3:59:31	
Antwerp	Marino Vanhoenacker (BEL)	3:41:46	Paul Matthews (AUS)	3:45:22	Bert Jammer (BEL)	3:46:35	
Calgary	Tim O'Donnell (USA)	3:55:28	Ben Hoffman (USA)	4:02:51	Jamie Whyte (NZL)	4:03:58	
Germany	Sebastian Kienle (GER)	4:04:34	Michael Raelert (GER)	4:05:25	Mathias Hecht (SUI)	4:05:52	
Lake Stevens	Joe Gambles (AUS)	3:56:36	Jeff Symonds (CAN)	4:03:46	Justin Park (USA)	4:07:26	
Timberman	Andy Potts (USA)	3:51:19	Alberto Casadei (ITA)	3:58:52	Massimo Cigana (ITA)	3:59:32	
Philippines	Terenzo Bozzone (NZL)	3:51:25	Chris McCormack (AUS)	3:52:18	Cameron Brown (NZL)	3:52:31	
Brazil	Santiago Ascenço (BRA)	3:47:09	Igor Amorelli (BRA)	3:52:21	Fabio Carvalho (BRA)	3:54:00	
Monaco	Axel Zeebroek (BEL)	4:15:16	Michael Weiss (AUT)	4:19:37	Tyler Butterfield (BER)	4:20:10	
Muskoka	Craig Alexander (AUS)	3:58:04	Richie Cunningham (USA)	4:02:02	Paul Matthews (AUS)	4:03:52	
Cancún	Oscar Galindez (ARG)	4:10:22	Paul Ambrose (GBR)	4:15:22	Igor Amorelli (BRA)	4:18:43	
Augusta	Greg Bennett (AUS)	3:47:07	Chris Legh (AUS)	3:49:27	Brian Fleischmann (USA)	3:50:44	
Putrajaya	Jan Řehula (CZE)	4:01:19	Domenico Passuello (ITA)	4:01:53	Cameron Watt (AUS)	4:03:52	

==== Women ====
Event	Gold	Time	Silver	Time	Bronze	Time	Reference
Longhorn	Lisa Bentley (CAN)	4:20:15	Pip Taylor (AUS)	4:23:49	Annie Gervais (CAN)	4:28:12	
Clearwater	Joanna Zeiger (USA)	4:02:49	Mary Beth Ellis (USA)	4:04:07	Becky Lavelle (USA)	4:07:32	
South Africa	Lucie Zelenková (CZE)	4:46:40	Heleen bij de Vaate (NED)	4:57:00	Claire Kinsley (RSA)	4:59:26	
Pucón	Heather Gollnick (USA)	4:28:58	Linsey Corbin (USA)	4:29:24	Amanda Stevens (USA)	4:40:50	
Geelong	Samantha Warriner (NZL)	4:14:33	Yvonne van Vlerken (NED)	4:15:25	Rebekah Keat (AUS)	4:17:35	
Singapore	Jodie Swallow (GBR)	4:19:10	Andrea Hewitt (NZL)	4:30:24	Tereza Macel (CAN)	4:30:41	
California	Mirinda Carfrae (AUS)	4:25:02	Sarah Groff (USA)	4:25:23	Leanda Cave (GBR)	4:25:43	
New Orleans	Natascha Badmann (SUI)	4:17:50	Catriona Morrison (GBR)	4:18:43	Joanna Zeiger (USA)	4:22:25	
China	Amanda Balding (AUS)	5:28:55	Gemma Keogh Peters (SIN)	5:53:40	Jutta Wessling (GER)	5:59:52	
St. Croix	Catriona Morrison (GBR)	4:32:38	Mirinda Carfrae (AUS)	4:35:21	Caitlyn Snow (USA)	4:40:44	
Florida	Leanda Cave (GBR)	4:15:29	Joanna Lawn (NZL)	4:23:42	Magali Tisseyre (CAN)	4:24:07	
Austria	Sandra Wallenhorst (GER)	4:28:46	Lucie Zelenkova (CZE)	4:30:03	Caroline Steffen (SUI)	4:31:50	
Hawaii	Belinda Granger (AUS)	4:26:08	Samantha McGlone (USA)	4:38:02	Rhae Shaw (USA)	4:46:08	
Switzerland	Sarah Schütz (SUI)	4:28:26	Erika Csomor (HUN)	4:29:03	Simone Benz (SUI)	4:33:36	
Boise	Magali Tisseyre (CAN)	4:12:29	Linsey Corbin (USA)	4:20:58	Samantha McGlone (USA)	4:25:10	
Kansas	Chrissie Wellington (GBR)	4:14:52	Pip Taylor (AUS)	4:19:42	Joanna Lawn (NZL)	4:20:44	
UK	Catriona Morrison (GBR)	4:40:14	Julie Dibens (GBR)	4:43:02	Bella Bayliss (GBR)	4:44:02	
Eagleman	Mirinda Carfrae (AUS)	4:13:28	Natascha Badmann (SUI)	4:17:01	Desiree Ficker (USA)	4:24:50	
Buffalo Springs	Amy Marsh (USA)	4:33:36	Kelly Williamson (USA)	4:35:04	Joanna Lawn (NZL)	4:36:37	
Vineman	Pip Taylor (AUS)	4:20:04	Tyler Stewart (USA)	4:21:34	Dede Griesbauer (USA)	4:23:29	
Steelhead	Samantha Warriner (NZL)	4:17:57	Leanda Cave (GBR)	4:25:12	Nina Craft (GBR)	4:26:22	
Antwerp	Sofie Goos (BEL)	4:08:07	Belinda Granger (AUS)	4:08:25	Delphine Pelletie (FRA)	4:09:47	
Calgary	Mirinda Carfrae (AUS)	4:11:05	Magali Tisseyre (CAN)	4:21:05	Catriona Morrison (GBR)	4:21:30	
Germany	Yvonne van Vlerken (NED)	4:42:46	Tiina Boman (FIN)	4:44:47	Eva Janssen (NED)	4:47:40	
Lake Stevens	Becky Lavelle (USA)	4:28:16	Heather Wurtele (CAN)	4:29:24	Michellie Jones (AUS)	4:31:07	
Timberman	Chrissie Wellington (GBR)	4:15:11	Catriona Morrison (GBR)	4:17:07	Magali Tisseyre (CAN)	4:23:54	
Philippines	Lisa Bentley (CAN)	4:24:29	Gina Kehr (USA)	4:26:11	Charlotte Paul (AUS)	4:31:26	
Brazil	Vanessa Gianinni (BRA)	4:29:35	Heather Gollnick (USA)	4:30:58	Pamela Tastets (CHL)	4:36:58	
Monaco	Christel Robin (FRA)	4:47:20	Marion Lorblanchet (FRA)	4:51:59	Jeanne Collonge (FRA)	4:52:27	
Muskoka	Mirinda Carfrae (AUS)	4:24:48	Rebeccah Wassner (USA)	4:29:34	Kelly Couch (USA)	4:36:29	
Cancún	Michellie Jones (AUS)	4:41:48	Daniela Sämmler (GER)	4:53:33	Katherine Baker (AUS)	4:55:54	
Augusta	Laura Bennett (USA)	4:18:36	Kelly Williamson (USA)	4:18:42	Desiree Ficker (USA)	4:20:47	
Putrajaya	Rachael Paxton (AUS)	4:30:47	Katya Meyer (USA)	4:36:17	Erin O'Hara (NZL)	4:37:33	
