= 2010 Ironman 70.3 World Championship =

The 2010 Ironman 70.3 World Championship was a triathlon competition held in Clearwater, Florida on November 13, 2010. It was sponsored by Foster Grant and organized by the World Triathlon Corporation. The championship race was the culmination of the Ironman 70.3 series of events that occurred from October 2009 to September 2010. Athletes, both professional and amateur, earned a spot in the championship race by qualifying in races throughout the 70.3 series. The 2010 Championship was won by Michael Raelert of Germany and Jodie Swallow of Great Britain.

This year marked the end of the Championship race being in Clearwater, Florida; which the city has hosted for five years. The Championship race moves to Henderson, Nevada, a suburb of Las Vegas, Nevada in 2011.

== Medallists ==
=== Men ===
Pos.	Time (h:mm:ss)	Name	Country	Split times (h:mm:ss)				
Pos.	Time (h:mm:ss)	Name	Country	Swim	T1	Bike	T2	Run
Gold medal	3:41:19	Michael Raelert	Germany	24:16	1:40	2:03:58	1:28	1:09:57
Silver medal	3:42:56	Filip Ospalý	Czech Republic	23:19	1:49	2:04:56	1:28	1:11:24
Bronze medal	3:44:18	Timothy O'Donnell	United States	23:20	1:46	2:04:52	1:37	1:12:43
4	3:44:48	Joe Gambles	Australia	24:18	1:53	2:02:24	1:34	1:14:39
5	3:45:33	Richie Cunningham	Australia	23:54	1:50	2:04:17	1:34	1:13:58
6	3:45:46	Igor Amorelli	Brazil	24:14	1:54	2:03:58	1:42	1:13:58
7	3:47:15	Daniel Fontana	Italy	23:19	1:46	2:08:12	1:34	1:12:24
8	3:47:32	Kevin Collington	United States	24:16	2:05	2:07:03	1:36	1:12:32
9	3:48:13	Matt Reed	United States	23:25	2:09	2:04:24	1:38	1:16:37
10	3:48:33	Chris Legh	Australia	25:37	1:57	2:05:45	1:41	1:13:33

=== Women ===
Pos.	Time (h:mm:ss)	Name	Country	Split times (h:mm:ss)				
Pos.	Time (h:mm:ss)	Name	Country	Swim	T1	Bike	T2	Run
Gold medal	4:06:28	Jodie Swallow	Great Britain	24:20	1:51	2:16:37	1:41	1:21:59
Silver medal	4:12:34	Leanda Cave	Great Britain	25:56	2:10	2:18:57	2:16	1:23:15
Bronze medal	4:13:04	Magali Tisseyre	Canada	27:22	2:01	2:19:25	1:48	1:22:28
4	4:13:32	Amanda Stevens	United States	25:13	2:07	2:19:43	1:42	1:24:47
5	4:17:08	Heather Jackson	United States	31:51	2:26	2:16:03	1:46	1:25:02
6	4:18:01	Lesley Paterson	United Kingdom	30:23	2:19	2:18:19	1:53	1:25:07
7	4:18:40	Angela Naeth	Canada	30:30	2:13	2:17:41	1:54	1:26:22
8	4:20:55	Julie Dibens	United Kingdom	25:16	2:21	2:16:19	1:56	1:35:03
9	4:21:18	Nina Kraft	Germany	26:33	2:20	2:26:20	2:08	1:23:57
10	4:22:55	Emma-Kate Lidbury	United Kingdom	27:21	2:11	2:20:10	2:09	1:31:04

== Qualification ==
The 2010 Ironman 70.3 Series featured 39 events that enabled qualification to the 2010 World Championship event. Some 70.3 events also served as qualifiers for the full Ironman World Championships in Hawaii. The 70.3 Series expanded the number of qualifying races from 34 in 2009 to 39 events in 2010. Those events added included races at Galveston Island (Texas), New Foundland Lake (Mooseman), Racine, Boulder, Japan, Branson, and Syracuse. The 5-year old Monaco Ironman 70.3 is no longer part of the series, which was re-labeled the TriStar111 Monaco. Early in 2010, the Ironman 70.3 Putrajaya race was tentatively scheduled for July 2010, but was removed from the series pending a reformat of the race.

=== Qualifying Ironman 70.3s ===
Date	Event	Location
Oct 25, 2009	Ironman 70.3 Austin	Austin, Texas, United States
Nov 14, 2009	Ironman 70.3 World Championship	Clearwater, Florida, United States
Jan 17, 2010	Ironman 70.3 South Africa	Buffalo City, South Africa
Jan 24, 2010	Ironman 70.3 Pucón	Pucón, Chile
Feb 6, 2010	Ironman 70.3 Geelong	Geelong, Australia
Mar 14, 2010	Ironman 70.3 China	Haikou, Hainan, China
Mar 21, 2010	Ironman 70.3 Singapore	Singapore
Mar 27, 2010	Ironman 70.3 California	Oceanside, California, United States
Apr 18, 2010	Ironman 70.3 New Orleans	New Orleans, Louisiana, United States
Apr 25, 2010	Ironman 70.3 Texas	Galveston Island, Texas, United States
May 2, 2010	Ironman 70.3 St. Croix	(United States Virgin Islands) St. Croix, US Virgin Islands
May 16, 2010	Rohto Ironman 70.3 Florida	Orlando, Florida, United States
May 30, 2010	Ironman 70.3 Austria	St. Pölten/Vienna, Austria
Jun 5, 2010	Ironman 70.3 Hawaii	Kohala, Hawaii, United States
Jun 6, 2010	Ironman 70.3 Switzerland	Rapperswil-Jona, Lake Zurich, Switzerland
Jun 6, 2010	Ironman 70.3 Mooseman	Newfound Lake, New Hampshire, United States
Jun 6, 2010	Ironman 70.3 Kansas	Lawrence, Kansas, United States
Jun 12, 2010	Ironman 70.3 Boise	Boise, Idaho, United States
Jun 13, 2010	Ironman 70.3 Eagleman	Cambridge, Maryland, United States
Jun 20, 2010	Ironman 70.3 U.K.	(United Kingdom) Wimbleball, Exmoor, UK
Jun 27, 2010	Ironman 70.3 Buffalo Springs Lake	Lubbock, Texas, United States
Jul 11, 2010	Ironman 70.3 Rhode Island	Providence, Rhode Island, United States
Jul 18, 2010	Ironman 70.3 Racine	Racine, Wisconsin, United States
Jul 18, 2010	Ironman 70.3 Vineman	Sonoma County, California, United States
Jul 25, 2010	Ironman 70.3 Antwerp	Antwerp, Belgium
Jul 31, 2010	Ironman 70.3 Steelhead	Benton Harbor, Michigan, United States
Aug 1, 2010	Ironman 70.3 Calgary	Calgary, Alberta, Canada
Aug 8, 2010	Ironman 70.3 Boulder	Boulder, Colorado, United States
Aug 15, 2010	Ironman 70.3 Germany	Wiesbaden/Rheingau-Taunus-Kreis, Germany
Aug 15, 2010	Ironman 70.3 Lake Stevens	Lake Stevens, WA, United States
Aug 22, 2010	Ironman 70.3 Philippines	Camarines Sur, Philippines
Aug 22, 2010	Ironman 70.3 Timberman	Gilford, New Hampshire, United States
Aug 28, 2010	Ironman 70.3 Brazil	Penha, Brazil
Sep 12, 2010	Ironman 70.3 Muskoka	Huntsville, Ontario, Canada
Sep 19, 2010	Ironman 70.3 Japan	Tokoname, Aichi, Japan
Sep 19, 2010	Ironman 70.3 Syracuse	Syracuse, NY, United States
Sep 19, 2010	Ironman 70.3 Branson	Branson, MO, United States
Sep 19, 2010	Ironman 70.3 Cancún	Cancún, Mexico
Sep 26, 2010	Ironman 70.3 Augusta	Augusta, Georgia, United States

=== 2010 Ironman 70.3 Series results ===
==== Men ====
Event	Gold	Time	Silver	Time	Bronze	Time	Reference
Longhorn	Richie Cunningham (AUS)	3:48:55	Brian Fleischmann (USA)	3:50:43	Alessandro Degasperi (ITA)	3:51:15	
Clearwater	Michael Raelert (GER)	3:34:04	Daniel Fontana (ITA)	3:36:44	Matthew Reed (USA)	3:37:50	
South Africa	Fraser Cartmell (GBR)	4:07:54	James Cunnama (RSA)	4:09:34	Brad Storm (RSA)	4:15:36	
Pucón	Reinaldo Colucci (BRA)	3:52:38	Daniel Fontana (ARG)	3:54:00	Oscar Galindez (ARG)	3:58:25	
Geelong	Craig Alexander (AUS)	3:53:15	Leon Griffin (AUS)	3:54:35	Tim Berkel (AUS)	3:56:10	
China	Fredrik Croneborg (SWE)	4:15:40	Chris McDonald (AUS)	4:21:39	Raimo Raudsepp (EST)	4:25:24	
Singapore	Craig Alexander (AUS)	3:53:31	James Cunnama (RSA)	3:54:23	Aaron Farlow (AUS)	3:55:45	
California	Michael Raelert (GER)	3:58:27	Matthew Reed (USA)	4:01:17	Rasmus Henning (DEN)	4:02:07	
New Orleans	Andy Potts (USA)	3:43:44	Terenzo Bozzone (NZL)	3:47:73	Paul Amey (GBR)	3:49:52	
Texas	Terenzo Bozzone (NZL)	3:49:06	Timothy O'Donnell (USA)	3:49:35	Chris Lieto (USA)	3:50:35	
St. Croix	Terenzo Bozzone (NZL)	4:06:02	Timothy O'Donnell (USA)	4:06:39	Tyler Butterfield (BER)	4:10:38	
Florida	Timothy O'Donnell (USA)	3:51:18	Viktor Zyemtsev (UKR)	3:52:39	Dirk Bockel (LUX)	3:52:55	
Austria	Filip Ospalý (CZE)	3:46:01	Chris McCormack (AUS)	3:47:00	Andreas Raelert (GER)	3:47:28	
Hawaii	Tim DeBoom (USA)	4:04:02	Luke Bell (AUS)	4:05:29	Matt Lieto (USA)	4:08:14	
Switzerland	Michael Raelert (GER)	3:47:47	Ronnie Schildknecht (SUI)	3:54:29	Olivier Marceau (SUI)	3:55:15	
Mooseman	Maksym Kriat (UKR)	4:01:12	Graham O'Grady (NZL)	4:02:44	Matty White (AUS)	4:06:16	
Kansas	Chris Lieto (USA)	3:44:07	Andy Potts (USA)	3:44:31	Andrew Yoder (USA)	3:49:46	
Boise	Craig Alexander (AUS)	4:02:11	Ben Hoffman (USA)	4:02:21	Tim Berkel (AUS)	4:08:08	
Eagleman	Terenzo Bozzone (NZL)	3:58:17	James Cotter (USA)	3:59:51	Andrew Yoder (USA)	4:00:38	
UK	Fraser Cartmell (SCO)	4:17:03	Philip Graves (GBR)	4:20:27	Jonas Djurback (SWE)	4:24:32	
Buffalo Springs	Chris Lieto (USA)	3:55:27	Terenzo Bozzone (NZL)	3:57:06	Ben Hoffman (USA)	3:58:22	
Rhode Island	Terenzo Bozzone (NZL)	4:01:15	Tim Berkel (AUS)	4:02:05	Paul Ambrose (GBR)	4:03:01	
Racine	Craig Alexander (AUS)	3:48:56	Matt White (USA)	3:56:07	T. J. Tollakson (USA)	4:00:36	
Vineman	Chris Lieto (USA)	3:54:05	Kieran Doe (NZL)	4:00:23	James Cotter (USA)	4:02:39	
Antwerp	Bart Aernouts (BEL)	3:43:38	Marino Vanhoenacker (BEL)	3:45:07	Dirk Bockel (LUX)	3:45:54	
Steelhead	James Cotter (USA)	3:53:13	Josh Rix (USA)	3:54:40	Matt White (USA)	3:55:22	
Calgary	Kieran Doe (NZL)	3:58:45	Brian Fleischmann (USA)	4:02:14	Paul Matthews (AUS)	4:03:41	
Boulder	Andy Potts (USA)	3:46:50	Tyler Butterfield (BER)	3:49:18	Stephen Hackett (AUS)	3:51:27	
Germany	Michael Raelert (GER)	4:03:48	Sebastian Kienle (GER)	4:05:55	Björn Andersson (SWE)	4:09:09	
Lake Stevens	Joe Gambles (AUS)	3:57:47	Paul Ambrose (GBR)	3:59:07	Luke Bell (AUS)	3:59:53	
Philippines	Pete Jacobs (AUS)	3:58:41	Terenzo Bozzone (NZL)	4:05:54	Fredrik Croneborg (SWE)	4:14:36	
Timberman	Andy Potts (USA)	3:50:51	Raynard Tissink (RSA)	3:53:32	Timothy O'Donnell (USA)	3:55:36	
Brazil	Ezequiel Morales (ARG)	3:52:17	Igor Amorelli (BRA)	3:54:28	Reinaldo Colucci (BRA)	3:56:01	
Muskoka	Craig Alexander (AUS)	3:58:33	Paul Matthews (AUS)	4:00:01	Raynard Tissink (RSA)	4:05:13	
Japan	Cameron Brown (NZL)	4:12:00	Fredrik Croneborg (SWE)	4:18:36	Hiroyuki Nishiuchi (JPN)	4:20:26	
Syracuse	Paul Matthews (AUS)	3:49:49	Maxim Kriat (UKR)	3:58:01	Sean Bechtel (CAN)	4:00:09	
Branson	Ben Hoffman (USA)	4:02:53	Tom Lowe (GBR)	4:05:38	Brian Fleischmann (USA)	4:08:25	
Cancún	Luke Bell (AUS)	3:59:46	Luke McKenzie (NZL)	4:02:30	Oscar Galindez (ARG)	4:05:20	
Augusta	Maksym Kriat (UKR)	3:46:54	Richie Cunningham (USA)	3:47:12	Victor Zyemtsev (UKR)	3:47:36	

==== Women ====
Event	Gold	Time	Silver	Time	Bronze	Time	Reference
Longhorn	Joanna Zeiger (USA)	4:14:53	Heather Jackson (USA)	4:17:14	Nicole Hofer (GER)	4:20:44	
Clearwater	Julie Dibens (GBR)	3:59:33	Mary Beth Ellis (USA)	4:03:49	Magali Tisseyre (CAN)	4:05:27	
South Africa	Mari Rabe (RSA)	4:35:54	Sandra Wallenhorst (GER)	4:37:01	Lucie Zelenkova (CZE)	4:43:01	
Pucón	Amanda Lovato (USA)	4:36:12	Heather Gollnick (USA)	4:38:42	Tereza Macel (CAN)	4:46:31	
Geelong	Caroline Steffen (SUI)	4:14:32	Carrie Leste (AUS)	4:19:32	Lisa Marangon (AUS)	4:19:49	
China	Belinda Granger (AUS)	4:42:58	Amanda Balding (AUS)	5:27:35	Nicole Roddie (AUS)	5:29:40	
Singapore	Caroline Steffen (SUI)	4:18:44	Jodie Swallow (GBR)	4:26:32	Margaret Shapiro (USA)	4:31:37	
California	Mirinda Carfrae (AUS)	4:20:29	Lesley Paterson (GBR)	4:24:31	Samantha McGlone (CAN)	4:26:43	
New Orleans	Sam Warriner (NZL)	4:16:44	Linsey Corbin (USA)	4:17:55	Amy Marsh (USA)	4:20:23	
Texas	Samantha McGlone (CAN)	4:17:22	Amanda Stevens (USA)	4:18:26	Kelly Williamson (USA)	4:19:02	
St. Croix	Catriona Morrison (GBR)	4:31:06	Sam Warriner (NZL)	4:42:28	Erin O'Hara (NZL)	4:54:27	
Florida	Leanda Cave (GBR)	4:14:22	Amanda Stevens (USA)	4:18:55	Magali Tisseyre (CAN)	4:23:10	
Austria	Yvonne van Vlerken (NED)	4:18:56	Erika Csomor (HUN)	4:18:56	Karin Thürig (SWI)	4:21:34	
Hawaii	Belinda Granger (AUS)	4:34:38	Bree Wee (USA)	4:40:13	Emily Cocks (USA)	4:45:05	
Switzerland	Caroline Steffen (SWI)	4:19:29	Nicole Hofer (SWI)	4:25:25	Karin Thürig (SWI)	4:29:09	
Mooseman	Magali Tisseyre (CAN)	4:30:46	Kate Major (AUS)	4:31:37	Samantha McGlone (CAN)	4:34:55	
Kansas	Chrissie Wellington (GBR)	4:07:49	Pip Taylor (AUS)	4:24:29	Linsey Corbin (USA)	4:25:58	
Boise	Julie Dibens (GBR)	4:25:14	Linsey Corbin (USA)	4:29:22	Heather Jackson (USA)	4:34:58	
Eagleman	Sam Warriner (NZL)	4:20:01	Samantha McGlone (CAN)	4:25:22	Michellie Jones (AUS)	4:28:25	
UK	Bella Bayliss (SCO)	4:53:52	Tamsin Lewis (AUS)	4:55:42	Emma Kate-Lidbury (GBR)	4:56:26	
Buffalo Springs	Magali Tisseyre (CAN)	4:23:21	Angela Naeth (CAN)	4:24:57	Jessica Jacobs (USA)	4:35:49	
Rhode Island	Kate Major (AUS)	4:30:36	Caitlin Snow (USA)	4:30:58	Sam Warriner (NZL)	4:33:32	
Racine	Sam Warriner (NZL)	4:17:42	Kate Major (AUS)	4:17:55	Desiree Ficker (USA)	4:22:51	
Vineman	Mirinda Carfrae (AUS)	4:15:51	Leanda Cave (GBR)	4:22:03	Tyler Stewart (USA)	4:25:11	
Antwerp	Sofie Goos (BEL)	4:13:39	Rachel Joyce (GBR)	4:16:24	Emma-Kate Lidbury (GBR)	4:19:55	
Steelhead	Kelly Williamson (USA)	4:15:41	Heather Jackson (USA)	4:18:51	Karen Smyers (USA)	4:29:25	
Calgary	Mirinda Carfrae (AUS)	4:21:32	Heather Wurtele (CAN)	4:24:45	Linsey Corbin (USA)	4:30:09	
Boulder	Julie Dibens (GBR)	4:19:46	Angela Naeth (CAN)	4:22:27	Jessica Meyers (USA)	4:25:09	
Germany	Yvonne van Vlerken (NED)	4:41:52	Desiree Ficker (USA)	4:42:15	Kristin Möller (GER)	4:43:10	
Lake Stevens	Melanie McQuaid (CAN)	4:27:16	Tyler Stewart (USA)	4:27:16	Samantha Warriner (NZL)	4:29:09	
Philippines	Magali Tisseyre (CAN)	4:27:01	Michellie Jones (AUS)	4:29:23	Rachael Paxton (AUS)	4:42:38	
Timberman	Chrissie Wellington (GBR)	4:10:11	Angela Naeth (CAN)	4:24:59	Heather Jackson (USA)	4:26:08	
Brazil	Vanessa Gianinni (BRA)	4:22:21	Maria Soledad Omar (ARG)	4:30:25	Ariane Monticeli (BRA)	4:38:33	
Muskoka	Mirinda Carfrae (AUS)	4:28:36	Joanna Lawn (AUS)	4:40:52	Claudia Johnston (CAN)	4:51:16	
Japan	Michelle Wu (AUS)	4:51:27	Rachael Paxton (AUS)	4:53:27	Emi Shiono (JPN)	4:54:25	
Syracuse	Samantha McGlone (CAN)	4:28:55	Rachel Challis (USA)	4:30:37	Kristin White (USA)	4:31:11	
Branson	Kelly Williamson (USA)	4:25:47	Angela Naeth (CAN)	4:33:47	Pip Taylor (AUS)	4:41:57	
Cancun	Amanda Stevens (USA)	4:25:34	Michellie Jones (AUS)	4:27:01	Kate Major (AUS)	4:28:27	
Augusta	Jessica Meyers (USA)	4:15:31	Magali Tisseyre (CAN)	4:16:33	Desiree Ficker (USA)	4:36:39	
