= Austin Marathon =

Annual race in the United States held since 1992

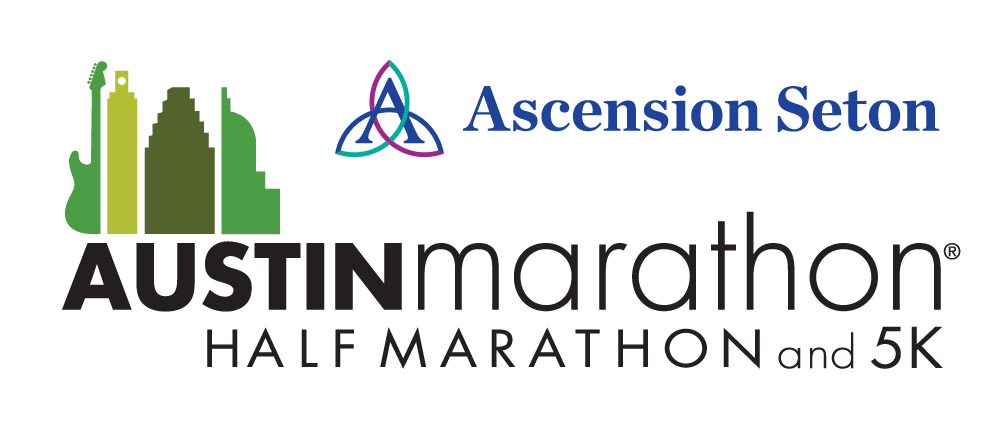
- Austin Marathon, Half Marathon, and 5K
- Date: February 15, 2026
- Location: Austin, Texas
- Event type: Road
- Distance: Marathon, half marathon, 5K
- Established: 1992 (34 years ago)
- Website: www.youraustinmarathon.com
- Participants: 19,490 finishers (2025)

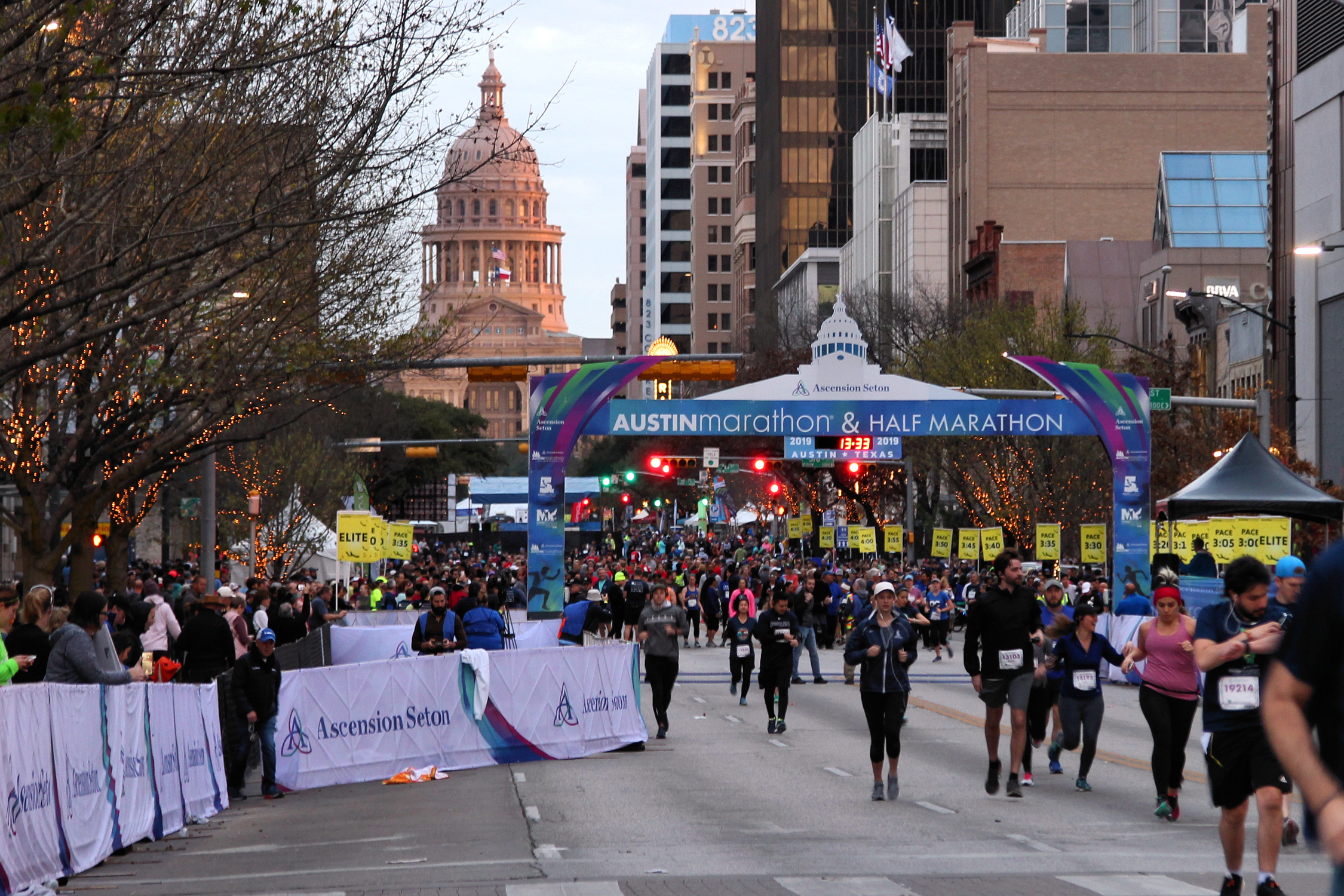
Start line on Congress Ave., 2019

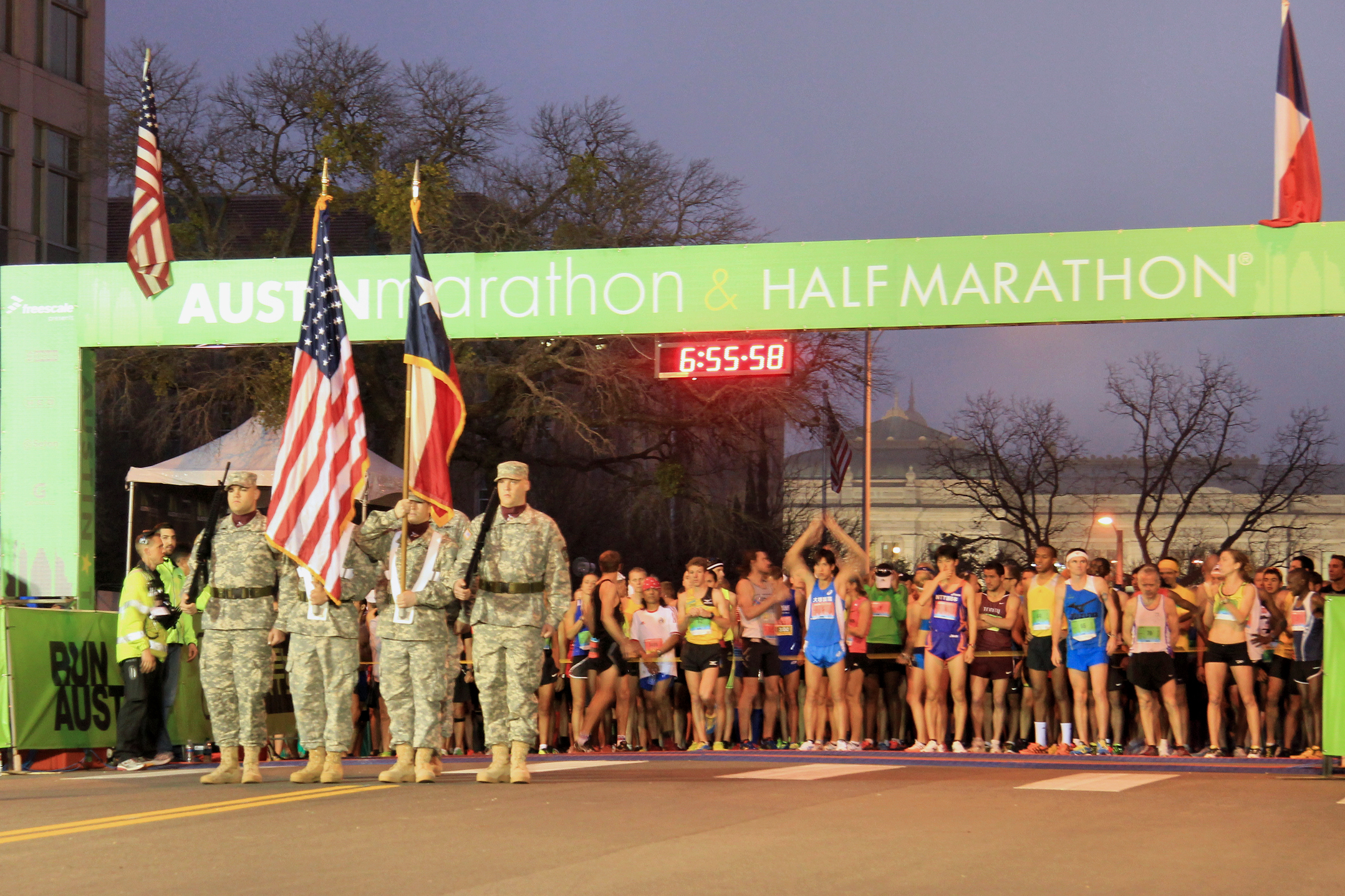
Prerace ceremonial honors, 2014

The Austin Marathon, officially known as the Ascension Seton Austin Marathon, Half Marathon, and 5K, is an annual marathon held in Austin, Texas, since 1992. The race weekend also features a half marathon and a 5K run all on the same morning, along with a two-day Health and Fitness Expo taking place on Friday and Saturday. The 35th edition of the event is scheduled for February 15, 2026.

The race begins at 7:00 a.m. It is live-streamed by FloSports, and participants typically come from all 50 U.S. states and more than 35 countries.

== History ==
It was founded in 1992 by Motorola, who served as title sponsor for fifteen years.

The 2021 edition of the marathon was cancelled, while the other races of the weekend were postponed to April 25, 2021, due to the coronavirus pandemic, with all registrants given the option of transferring their entry to the new date, or to 2022, 2023, or 2024. To properly mark the event's 30th anniversary with a running of the full marathon, anniversary celebrations would be extended to 2022.

== Course ==
External image
- Course map of full marathon in 2020

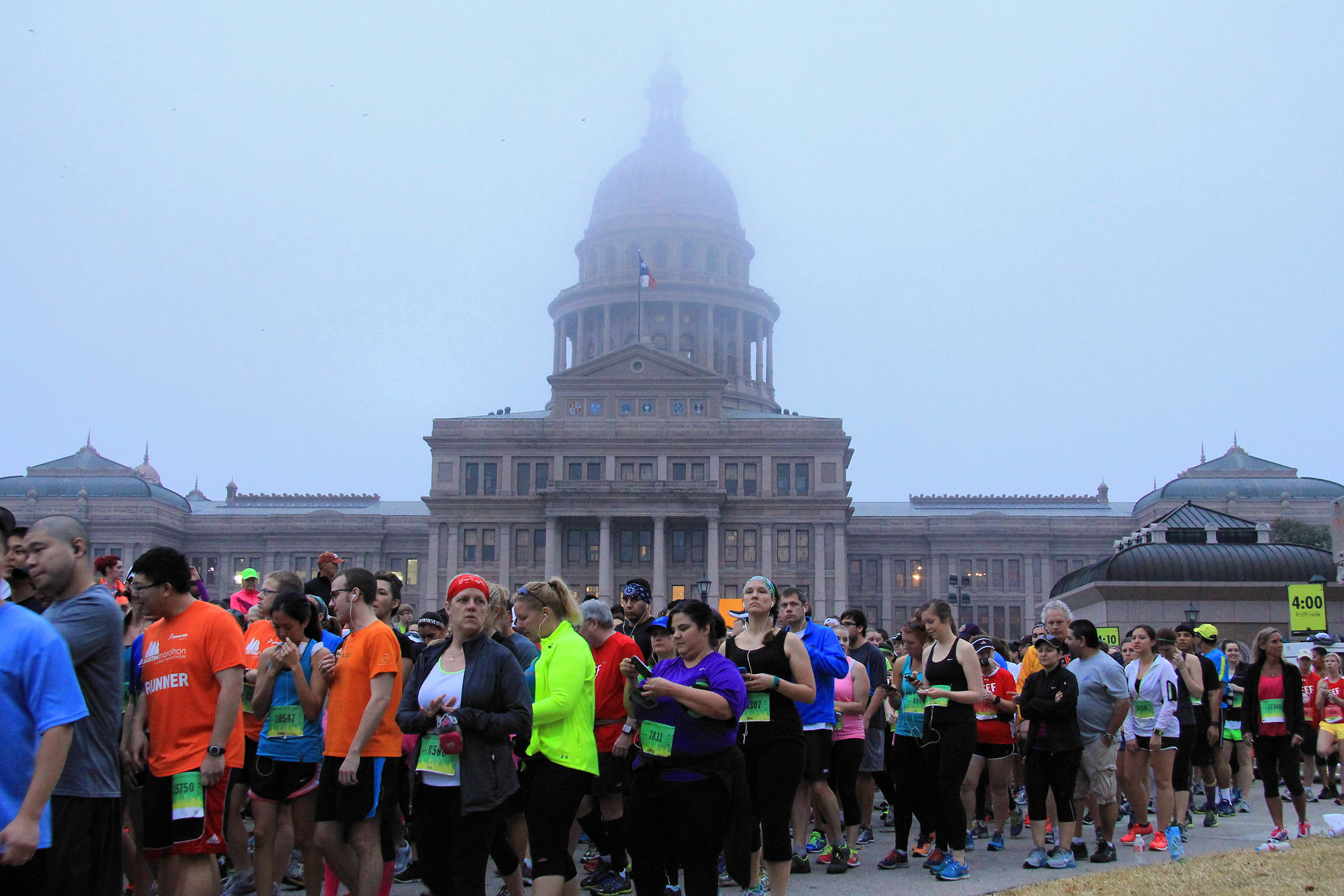
Starting area near the Capitol, 2014

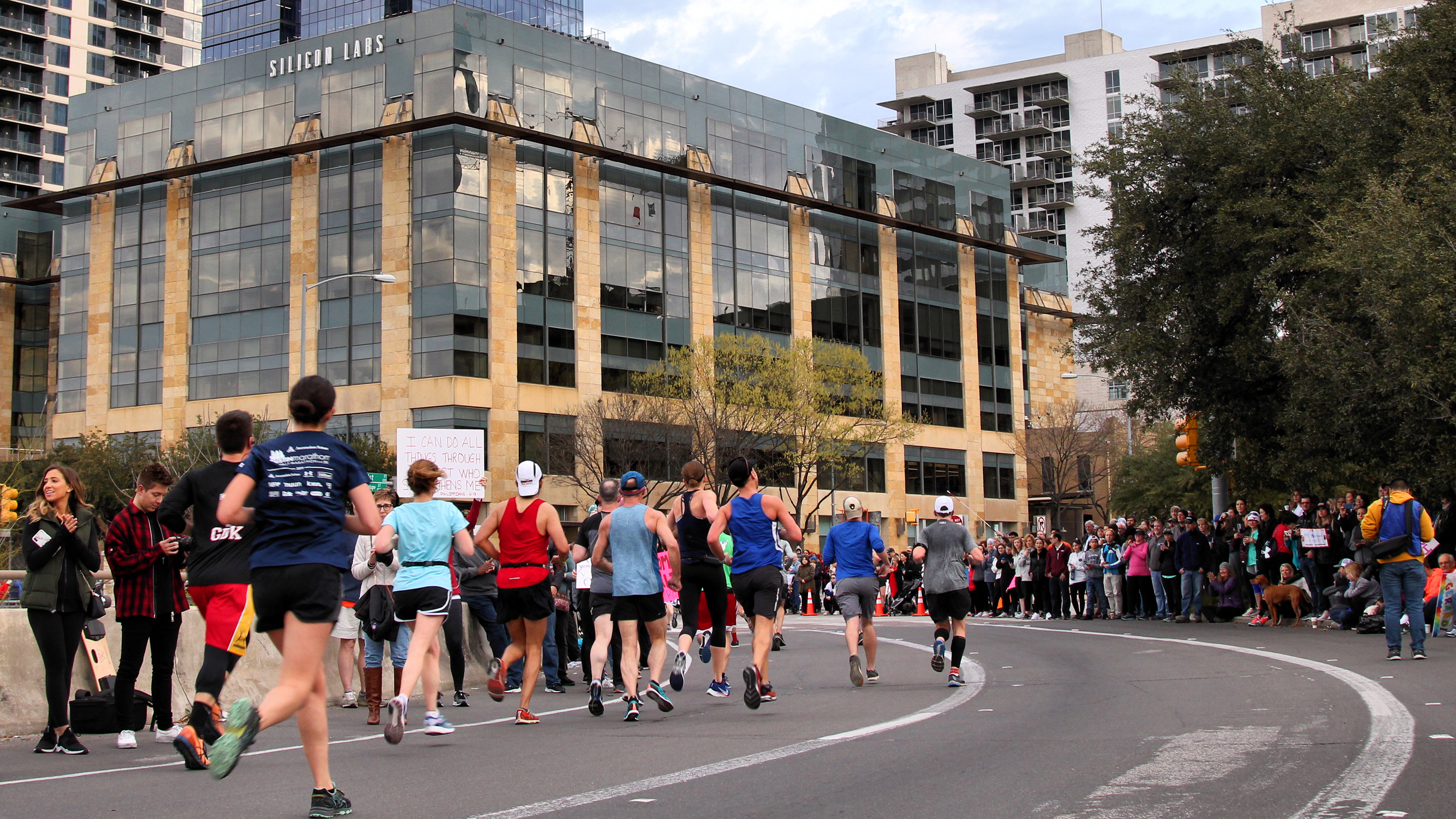
Runners entering downtown, 2019

The Austin Marathon and Austin Half Marathon both start at 2nd St. and Congress Avenue. The course goes by Austin landmarks and areas, like downtown, the Colorado River, SoCo, historic Hyde Park, East Austin, and the University of Texas at Austin campus and tower. Bands perform live music along the race route in a tribute to Austin's label as The Live Music Capital of the World. The race ends near where it begins at 9th and Congress Ave. in front of the picturesque Texas State Capitol. The course is USATF-certified.

The course that debuted in 2018 was designed to provide a better participant and spectator experience and allow enhanced traffic flow along the course, while still finishing with the picturesque Texas State Capitol as every runner's backdrop. The first half of the Austin Marathon was not changed. After Mile 12, half marathoners head south to the finish line, while marathoners continue east before turning north and running on Guadalupe St. through the heart of the University of Texas campus.

Aid stations are placed along the course: 22 for the marathon and 9 for the half marathon, each providing water, electrolyte drinks, restrooms, and medical support. Energy gel stations are also available at designated points.

Time limits are enforced for both distances. Marathon runners must maintain a 16-minute-per-mile pace (7 hours), while half marathon participants must maintain an 18-minute-per-mile pace (4 hours).

The Austin Marathon weekend also includes a 5K race, which begins at the same downtown start line as the marathon and half marathon. The 5K course follows an out-and-back route along Congress Avenue, giving participants a view of the Texas State Capitol before returning to the finish. Proceeds from the 5K benefit the Paramount Theatre, a historic performing arts venue in downtown Austin. Through this partnership, the event helps support the theater’s operations and community programming.

== Community Events ==
In addition to the races, the Austin Marathon organizes several community-focused programs leading up to and during race weekend with their sister event the Spurs Austin International Half. These include Run Austin Launch Week in the fall and Kickoff Week, a series of group runs, giveaways, and promotional activities that engage local runners and partner brands ahead of registration deadlines.

Race weekend itself also features community events beyond the races, including the two-day Health and Fitness Expo, post-race celebrations, and activations from local and national sponsors. These events are positioned as opportunities for athletes, spectators, and the Austin community to come together and celebrate what organizers describe as “the running social event of the year.”

== Community Initiatives & Charity Program ==
Austin Gives Miles

The marathon's official charity program, raised $702,500 in 2020. The 25 Central Texas nonprofit organizations accepted into the program worked to exceed the program's fundraising goal while increasing awareness of their organization and recruiting race day volunteers. Since 2014, Austin Gives Miles has raised $6.1 million for Central Texas nonprofit organizations.

In 2019, Moody Foundation became presenting sponsor for Austin Gives Miles. Since 2015, Austin Gives Miles has been a Moody Foundation grant recipient.

As part of the program participants are offered opportunities to earn their race entry by fundraising as part of official fundraisers for all official charities and meeting fundraising minimums.

Dell Children's

Dell Children's Medical Center of Central Texas serves as the official charity partner of the Austin Marathon. Participants can fundraise for the hospital through the marathon’s charity program, supporting pediatric healthcare in Central Texas.

Run Forward Initiative

Launched in 2023, the Run Forward Initiative aims to increase accessibility to the marathon by providing race entries to individuals facing financial, social, or health-related barriers. For every runner who registers during the Run Austin Launch Week, up to 500 entries are donated to the program. These donated entries are distributed through the Austin Marathon Gives program and a public application form for those with expressed need.

=== Annual Appreciation Program ===
Each year, the marathon honors a specific group of community workers through its Appreciation Program. In 2026, the program focuses on non-profit employees, offering a 50% discount on race registration to full-time staff members of registered non-profit organizations. To qualify, individuals must provide verification of employment, such as a recent pay stub, employee ID badge, or a signed employment verification letter.

Economic Impacts

According to estimates, the Ascension Seton Austin Marathon’s economic impact has grown steadily over the past decade, from $22.4 million in 2014 to an estimated $64 million in 2025. From 2016 through 2019, economic impact findings were calculated by experts at St. Edward's University’s Bill Munday School of Business in partnership with the community calculating an increase from $25.7 million in 2016 to $48.5 million in 2019. In 2025, the event generated an estimated 17,500 hotel room nights, reflecting its significant contribution to Austin’s hospitality and tourism sectors.

== Sponsorship ==
Marathon founder Motorola served as the marathon's title sponsor for fifteen years.

The marathon was sponsored by AT&T in 2007 and 2008, but ran with no title sponsor in 2009. From 2010 to 2013, the race was called the LIVESTRONG Austin Marathon. Freescale returned as presenting sponsor in 2014 and 2015. After Freescale was merged with NXP Semiconductors in December 2015, NXP becoming the presenting sponsor for 2016 and 2017. Under Armour was the presenting sponsor of the 2018 Austin Marathon, but had no title sponsor. In 2019, an agreement was reached naming Ascension Seton the title sponsor. Under Armour also returned as presenting sponsor for the 2019 - 2022 Austin Marathon. KXAN-TV became title sponsor of the KXAN SimpleHealth 5K benefitting Paramount Theatre in 2019 - 2023.

The 2026 Ascension Seton Austin Marathon, Half Marathon, and 5K are supported by a variety of sponsors and partners. Ascension Seton serves as the title sponsor, providing medical support during the event. The Moody Foundation is the presenting sponsor of Austin Marathon Gives, the race’s charitable initiative. Additional sponsors include Bare Performance Nutrition, PNC Bank, Fleet Feet, GOOD GOOD, Austin Sports Commission, Fogo de Chao, Spibelt and FinisherPix.

== Winners ==
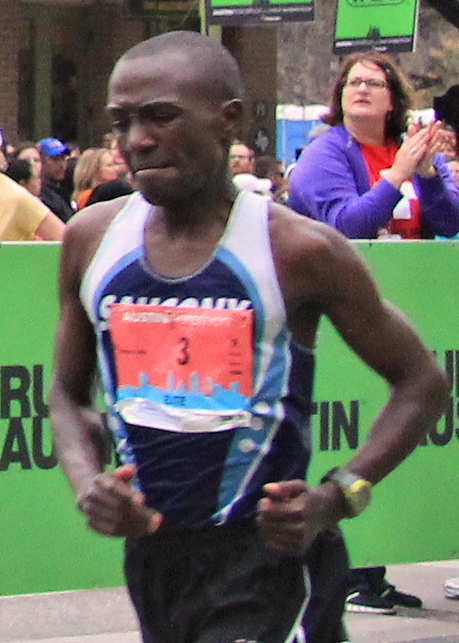
Joseph Mutinda, seconds before victory in 2014, and months before disqualification for drug test failures

Key: Course record (in bold)

Ed.	Date	Male Winner	Time	Female Winner	Time	Rf.
1	1992.03.15	Alberto Puente (MEX)	2:24:00	Kay Jones (USA)	3:13:13	
2	1993.03.07	Brad Hawthorne (USA)	2:17:53	Lori Norwood (USA)	2:47:08	
3	1994.03.06	Doug Kurtis (USA)	2:21:35	Irina Bondarchuk (RUS)	2:42:22	
4	1995.03.05	José Iniguez (MEX)	2:16:27	Andrea Bowman (USA)	2:40:19	
5	1996.02.18	Dmitriy Kapitanov (RUS)	2:15:59	Svetlana Zakharova (RUS)	2:36:45	
6	1997.02.16	Andrei Tarasov (RUS)	2:16:52	Alla Doudayeva (BLR)	2:39:55	
7	1998.02.15	Abderrahim Benredouane (MAR)	2:16:45	Tamara Karlyakova (RUS)	2:37:55	
8	1999.02.14	Peter Fleming (SCO)	2:17:14	Lydia Grigoryeva (RUS)	2:35:38	
9	2000.02.20	Janko Benša (FRY)	2:14:18	Tatyana Titova (RUS)	2:34:03	
10	2001.02.18	Mukhamet Nazipov (RUS)	**2:11:14**	Elena Paramonova (RUS)	2:32:56	
11	2002.02.17	Andrzej Krzyścin (POL)	2:12:10	Marian Sutton (ENG)	2:31:43	
12	2003.02.16	Andrzej Krzyścin (POL)	2:12:40	Sylvia Skvortsova (RUS)	2:37:22	
13	2004.02.15	Andrzej Krzyścin (POL)	2:14:18	Tatyana Borisova (KGZ)	**2:30:40**	
14	2005.02.13	Mikhail Khobotov (RUS)	2:12:38	Tatyana Borisova (KGZ)	2:31:01	
15	2006.02.19	Mindaugas Pukstas (LTU)	2:13:43	Tatyana Pozdnyakova (UKR)	2:34:23	
16	2007.02.18	Jynocel Basweti (KEN)	2:14:02	Moges Zebenaye (ETH)	2:39:46	
17	2008.02.17	Jacob Frey (USA)	2:20:38	Lucy Hassell (ENG)	2:36:26	
18	2009.02.15	Jeremy Borling (USA)	2:30:05	Elle Pishny (USA)	2:52:32	
19	2010.02.14	Keith Pierce (USA)	2:20:35	Elle Pishny (USA)	2:53:16	
20	2011.02.20	Keith Pierce (USA)	2:29:25	Desiree Ficker (USA)	2:50:35	
21	2012.02.19	Edward Kiptum (KEN)	2:22:50	Shannon Bixler (USA)	3:02:28	
22	2013.02.17	Omar Martinez (USA)	2:35:09	Mariko Neveu (USA)	2:55:04	
23	2014.02.16	Kipkoech Ruto (KEN) (Note: Joseph Mutinda of Kenya crossed the finish line first in 2:14:16, but was later disqualified for doping.)	2:14:45	Marnie Staehly (USA)	2:57:27	
24	2015.02.15	Betram Keter (KEN)	2:16:21	Cynthia Jerop (KEN)	2:54:22	
25	2016.02.14	Hayato Sonodo (JPN)	2:23:30	Chandi Moore (USA)	3:02:39	
26	2017.02.19	Joe Thorne (USA)	2:32:05	Allison Macsas (USA)	2:48:16	
27	2018.02.18	Joey Whelan (USA)	2:21:37	Allison Macsas (USA)	2:43:11	
28	2019.02.17	Joey Whelan (USA)	2:17:03	Heather Lieberg (USA)	2:42:27	
29	2020.02.16	William Bertrand (USA)	2:28:11	Sarah Jackson (USA)	2:55:16	
	2021	Event was abbreviated due to coronavirus restrictions. A limited half marathon and 5K were held.				
30	2022.02.20	Sammy Rotich (KEN)	2:14:24	Kelsey Bruce (USA)	2:35:17	
31	2023.02.19	George Onyancha (KEN)	2:16:32	Damaris Areba (ETH)	2:36:48	
32	2024.02.18	George Onyancha (KEN)	2:19:07	Damaris Areba (ETH)	2:38:52	
33	2025.02.16	Bradley Makuvire (ZWE)	2:18:56	Janet Rono (KEN)	2:41:04	
34	2026.02.15	Joey Whelan (USA)	2:13:18	Kellyn Taylor (USA)	2:33:28	
