= Saint Vincent and the Grenadines–Taiwan relations =

- Saint Vincent and the Grenadines: Taiwan

Diplomatic mission
- Embassy of St. Vincent, Taipei: Embassy of Taiwan, Kingstown

Envoy
- Ambassador Andrea Bowman: Ambassador Fiona Fan

Saint Vincent and the Grenadines–Taiwan relations refers to bilateral relations between Saint Vincent and the Grenadines and the Republic of China.

== History ==
On 15 August 1981, the Prime Minister of Saint Vincent Milton Cato visited Taiwan and signed a communiqué with the Premier of Taiwan Sun Yun-suan, officially establishing diplomatic relations between the two countries.

In August 2016, Leader of the New Democratic Party Arnhim Eustace held a press conference, where he announced the party's intention to switch relations to the People's Republic of China if it became the ruling party. Then in October, during an event celebrating Taiwanese National Day, Taiwanese president Tsai Ing-wen met with Vincentian Prime Minister Ralph Gonsalves where they walked side by side to dissuade rumors of a diplomatic split. In November 2016, Eustace resigned from his post as party leader, and new leader Godwin Friday announced that he will not make changes to the country's diplomatic relations with Taiwan.

== Diplomatic relations ==
On 24 March 1983, the Taiwanese government established an embassy at the Vincentian capital of Kingstown. On 8 August 2019, the Vincentian government established its embassy in Taipei, which is also its first in Asia.

== Bilateral Agreements ==
The following list includes agreements that have been signed between Saint Vincent and the Grenadines and Taiwan:

Date	Agreement	Notes
31 August 1982	Agreement on Agricultural Technical Cooperation 《農業技術合作協定》	(Note: Extended: 19 December 1984, 4 March 1987, 17 October 1988, 18 December 1996, 28 September 2000; Re-signed: 28 April 2005, 20 September 2006, 23 April 2009, 2 October 2012, 7 August 2015)
19 August 1992	Treaty of Extradition 《引渡條約》	
15 March 1995	Treaty of Amity 《友好條約》	
13 August 1999	Agreement on ICDF Volunteers 《關於國際合作發展基金會志工協定》	(Note: Amended: 24 December 2004)
1 June 2005	《聖文森及格瑞那丁外交及公務護照入境中華民國(台灣)免簽證協定》	
20 September 2006	Memorandum of Understanding in the Area of Health 《衛生領域瞭解備忘錄》	
19 November 2009	Memorandum of Understanding on Human Resources Development 《育才計畫瞭解備忘錄》	
17 December 2009	Agreement for the Reciprocal Promotion and Protection of Investments 《投資相互促進暨保護協定》	
8 November 2010	Agreement on Cooperation in Information and Communication Technology (ICT) 《資訊通信技術合作協定》	(Note: Re-signed: 7 June 2016)
16 November 2012	Agreement Concerning the Exchange of Financial Intelligence Related to Money Laundering and Terrorist Financing 《關於洗錢及資助恐怖分子相關金融情資交換協定》	
20 December 2016	Agreement Concerning Cooperation in Immigration Affairs and Human Trafficking Prevention 《有關移民事務與防制人口販運合作協定》	(Note: Signed abroad: 21 April 2017)
22 February 2017	Agreement on Police Cooperation 《警政合作協定》	(Note: Signed abroad: 21 April 2017)
1 February 2018	Agreement on the Capacity Building Project for the Prevention and Control of Diabetes in Saint Vincent and the Grenadines 《糖尿病防治能力建構計畫協定》	
12 December 2018	Agreement on Technical Cooperation 《技術合作協定》	
16 July 2019	Agreement on Public Finance Cooperation 《財政合作協定》	
16 July 2019	Agreement on Combating Transnational Crimes 《打擊跨國犯罪協定》	
8 August 2022	Treaty on Mutual Legal Assistance in Criminal Matters 《刑事司法互助條約》	
8 August 2022	Treaty on the Transfer of Sentenced Persons 《移交受刑人條約》	

== Trade relations ==
Trade Volume between Saint Vincent and Taiwan (in USD)
Year	Trade volume	Annual change	Ranking	Taiwan → SVG	Annual change	Ranking	SVG → Taiwan	Annual change	Ranking
2022	1,019,041	▼24.97%	192	999,575	▼26.37%	177	19,466	▲2766.86%	198
2023	355,747	▼65.09%	201	258,707	▼74.12%	196	97,040	▲398.51%	180
2024	1,142,876	▲221.261%	189	1,095,573	▲323.480%	174	47,303	▼51.254%	234

=== Main products ===
Taiwan's main exports to Saint Vincent include ventilators, synthetic fiber fabrics, fertilizer, air compressor, chairs, and spraying equipment. Saint Vincent's main exports to Taiwan include spectrum analyzers and waste paper.

== See also ==
- List of ambassadors of the Republic of China to Saint Vincent and the Grenadines

== 外部連結 ==
- "中華民國外交部聖文森及格瑞那丁簡介". Archived from the original on 2021-01-21.
  - "Account on Facebook". Archived from the original on 2020-09-20.
  - "Account on X".
- 中華民國駐聖文森及格瑞那丁大使館
  - "Account on Facebook". Archived from the original on 2019-02-21.
  - "Account on X".
- "聖文森及格瑞那丁外交部". Archived from the original on 2023-08-03.
  - "Account on Facebook". Archived from the original on 2019-02-21.
  - "Account on X".
- "聖文森及格瑞那丁駐中華民國大使館".
  - "Account on Facebook". Archived from the original on 2022-03-31.
