= Magali Tisseyre =

Canadian triathlete

Personal information
- Born: October 27, 1981 (age 44) Montreal, Quebec
- Height: 5 ft 4 in (1.63 m)

Sport
- Country: Canada
- Coached by: Paulo Sousa
Medal record
Representing Canada
Women's triathlon
Ironman 70.3
Bronze medal – third place	2009	Individual
Bronze medal – third place	2010	Individual

Magali Tisseyre (born October 27, 1981) is a Canadian triathlete from Montreal who races primarily in long distance, non-drafting triathlon events. She took third place at both the 2009 and 2010 Ironman 70.3 World Championships.

== Career ==
Tisseyre studied kinesiology at Laval University and went on to obtain her master's degree in biomechanics at McGill University. While attending school she got involved with a local triathlon club where she discovered a love for the sport. As an amateur she won the Canadian University Championship at the age of 23 and then won the 20-24 female age group at the 2005 ITU World Duathlon Championships.

In 2006 and 2007, Tisseyre competed on the ITU triathlon and duathlon racing circuit. She also competed in cycling events where she competed in the Le Tour du Grand Montréal and finished second in the 2008 Mount Washington Auto Road Bicycle Hillclimb.

In 2008 and 2009, Tisseyre began focusing on long distance triathlon and competing in various Ironman 70.3 distance races. At the end of 2009 she took third place at the Ironman 70.3 World Championship in Clearwater, Florida. Her efforts that year led to her being called Triathlete magazine's Ironman 70.3 Triathlete of the Year. In 2010, she matched the previous year's finish with another third place.

== Notable results ==
Tisseyre's notable race results include:

- 2005 20-24 Age Group World Duathlon - 1st
- 2009 Ironman 70.3 World Championship - 3rd
- 2009 Ironman 70.3 Boise - 1st
- 2010 Ironman 70.3 World Championship - 3rd
- 2010 Ironman 70.3 Philippines - 1st
- 2010 Ironman 70.3 Buffalo Springs - 1st
- 2010 Ironman 70.3 Mooseman - 1st
- 2011 Rev3 Anderson - 1st
- 2011 Ironman 70.3 Pocono Mountains - 1st
- 2011 Ironman 70.3 Boise - 1st
- 2011 Ironman 70.3 Providence - 1st
- 2012 Ironman 70.3 Calgary - 1st
- 2012 Ironman 70.3 Mont-Tremblant - 1st
- 2012 Ironman 70.3 Mooseman - 1st
- 2013 Ironman 70.3 Muncie - 1st
- 2014 Ironman 70.3 Miami - 1st
- 2014 Ironman 70.3 Silverman - 1st
- 2015 Ironman 70.3 Los Cabos - 1st
- 2015 Ironman 70.3 World Championship - 4th
- 2015 Ironman 70.3 Monterrey - 1st
- 2016 Ironman 70.3 Palmas, South American Championship - 1st
- 2017 Ironman Argentina - 3rd
- 2017 Ironman Mont-Tremblant - 5th
- 2017 Ironman 70.3 Mont-Tremblant - 3rd
