= Michael Raelert =

German triathlete

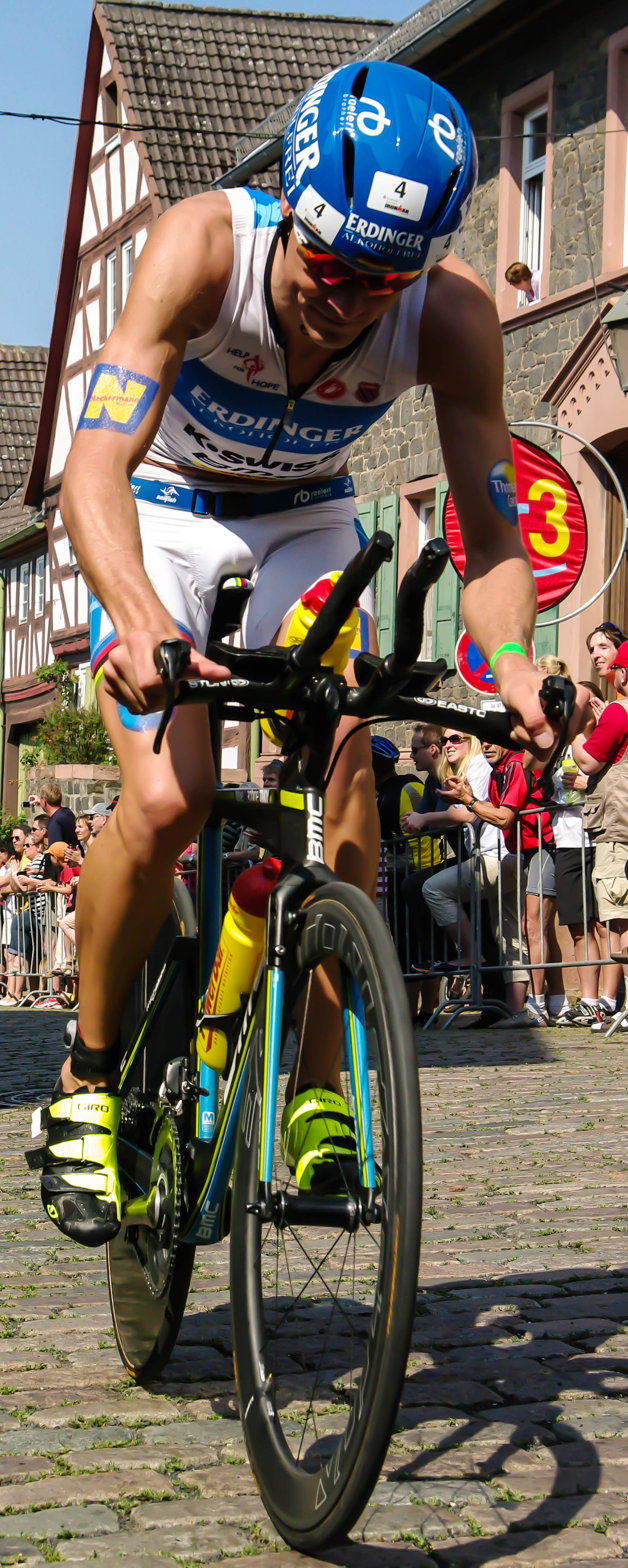
- Raelert in 2013

Personal information
- Born: 29 August 1980 (age 45)
- Height: 188 cm (6 ft 2 in)
- Weight: 74 kg (163 lb)

Sport
- Country: Germany
Medal record
Men's triathlon
Representing Germany
Ironman 70.3 World Championship
Gold medal – first place	2010 Clearwater	Elite
Gold medal – first place	2009 Clearwater	Elite

Michael Raelert (born 29 August 1980) is a German triathlete who is the 2009 and 2010 Ironman 70.3 World Champion. In 2010, Raelert won Ironman 70.3 races at Switzerland, California, and Germany, as well as the 28th Avia Wildflower Triathlon.

Raelert's older brother, Andreas Raelert, is also an active triathlete.
