= Lori Norwood =

Personal information
- Born: July 30, 1964 (age 61) Panama

Sport
- Country: United States
Medal record
Modern Pentathlon
Representing United States
World Modern Pentathlon Championships
| Gold medal – first place | 1989 Wiener Neustadt | Women's |
| Silver medal – second place | 1990 Linköping | Women's |
Goodwill Games
| Gold medal – first place | 1990 Seattle | Women's modern pentathlon |
| Bronze medal – third place | 1986 Moscow | Women's modern pentathlon |

Lori Norwood (born July 30, 1964) is a retired modern pentathlete turned sculptor. Norwood was the first U.S. woman to win a modern pentathlon world title when she won gold at the 1989 World Modern Pentathlon Championships. She won her medal upon returning to competition from a 2 1/2-year absence from the sport. During her career, she was named Amateur of the Year in 1990 by Women's Sports Foundation. After her retirement, Norwood became a sculptor and was inducted into the San Antonio Sports Hall of Fame in 2015.

== Early life and education ==
On July 30, 1964, Norwood was born in Panama and raised as a military brat. As a child, she lived in various parts of the world including Brazil and Thailand. She began her modern pentathlon career during her teens after a friend recommended the sport based on Norwood's previous experience with shooting and horseback riding. For her post-secondary education, Norwood attended the University of Texas in the early 1980s and competed in cross-country running. She later went back to the Texan university to complete a Bachelor of Fine Arts during the late 1980s.

== Career ==
Norwood was banned from competition after testing positive for Gamma-Butyrolactone at the 1986 World Modern Pentathlon Championships. During her two and a half year ban, Norwood resumed her post-secondary studies and returned to competition in 1989. Upon her return, she won back to back medals at the World Modern Pentathlon Championships with a gold in 1989 and a silver in 1990. With her gold medal in 1989, Norwood became the first woman of the United States to win a world title in modern penthatlon.

Outside of the World Championships, Norwood won a bronze at the 1986 Goodwill Games and a silver at the 1989 United States National Pentathlon Championships. She won additional gold medals at the 1990 Goodwill Games and U.S. National Pentathlon Championships. Her total of 5,604 points was a world record at the 1990 National Championships.

After her retirement from modern pentathlon in 1991, Norwood became a sculptor. She completed projects for cities in the Southern United States before going to Lawrence, Kansas in 2007. Among her works is a sculpture she made for the 2012 Summer Olympics titled The All-Around Athlete. Apart from sculpting, Norwood became a marathon runner in the early 1990s and won multiple races including the 1992 Austin Marathon.

== Awards and honors ==
Norwood was named Amateur of the Year in 1990 by the Women's Sports Foundation. In 2015, she was inducted into the San Antonio Sports Hall of Fame.

== Personal life ==
Norwood is married and has two children.
