= Heather Lieberg =

American long-distance runner

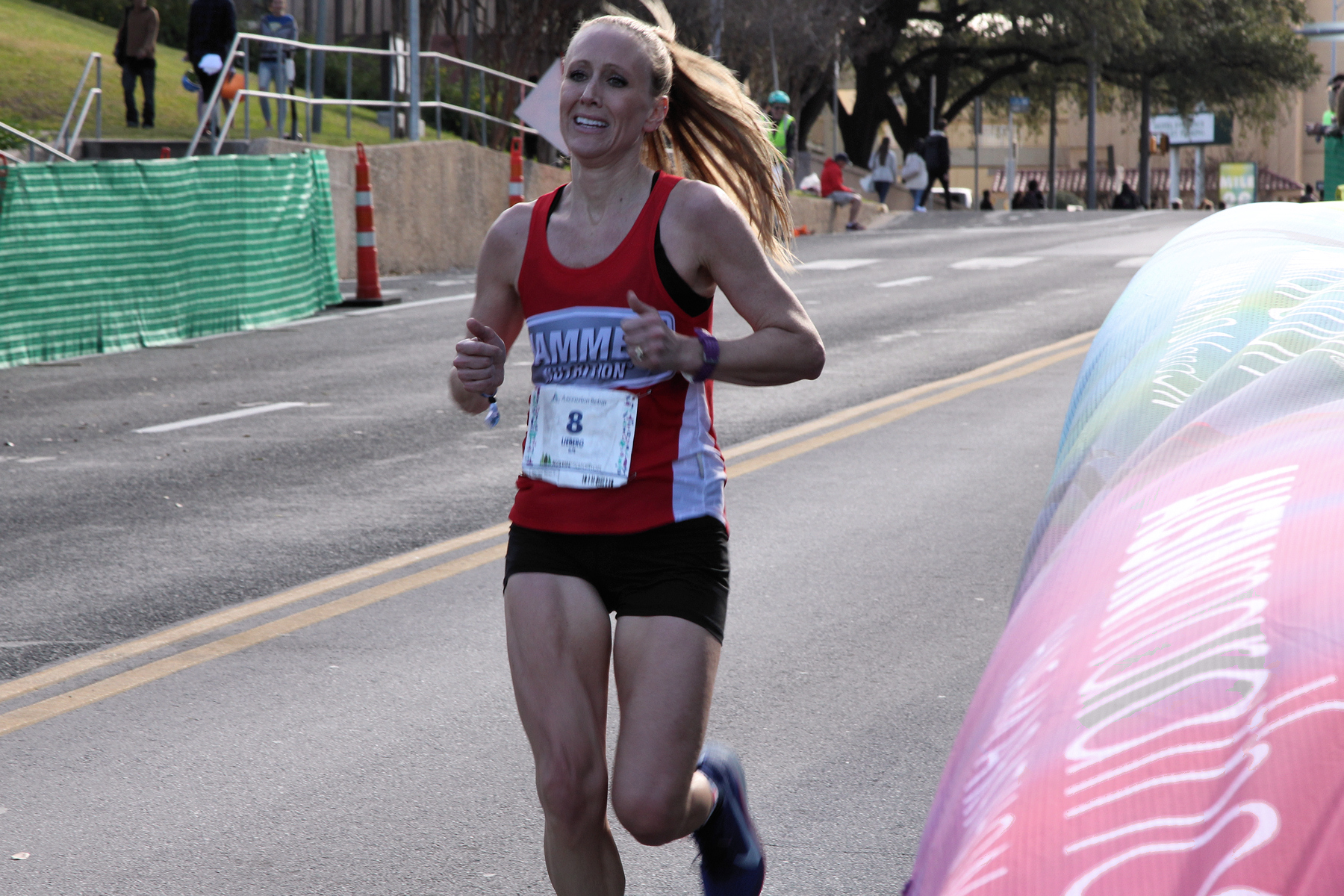
- Lieberg during the Austin Marathon in 2019

Personal information
- Born: June 18, 1979 (age 47)

Sport
- Country: United States
- Sport: Track and field
- Event: long-distance running
- Updated on September 2, 2015

Heather Lieberg (born June 18, 1979) is a female American long-distance runner. She competed in the marathon event at the 2015 World Championships in Athletics in Beijing, China, but was forced to drop out of the race early because of a foot injury.

She won Texas's Austin Marathon in 2019 in a time of 2:42:27.

== See also ==
- United States at the 2015 World Championships in Athletics
