= Abderrahim Ben Redouane =

Moroccan long-distance runner

Personal information
- Nationality: Moroccan
- Born: 2 March 1966 (age 59)

Sport
- Sport: Long-distance running
- Event: Marathon

Abderrahim Ben Redouane (born 2 March 1966) is a Moroccan long-distance runner. He competed in the men's marathon at the 1996 Summer Olympics. In 1998 he won the Austin Marathon in Texas with a time of 2:16:45.
