= Sportswoman of the Year Award =

American sports award

- Location: New York City
- Country: United States
- Presented by: Women's Sports Foundation
- First award: 1980
- Final award: 2023
- Website: Official website

The Sportswoman of the Year Award is given by the Women's Sports Foundation every year. This foundation recognizes both an individual and a team Sportswoman on their performance over a 12-month period. This award is given based on their new records and their world championships won.

The following table reflects past winners of the Sportswoman of the Year Award in individual and team sports.

== Individual Sport Winner ==
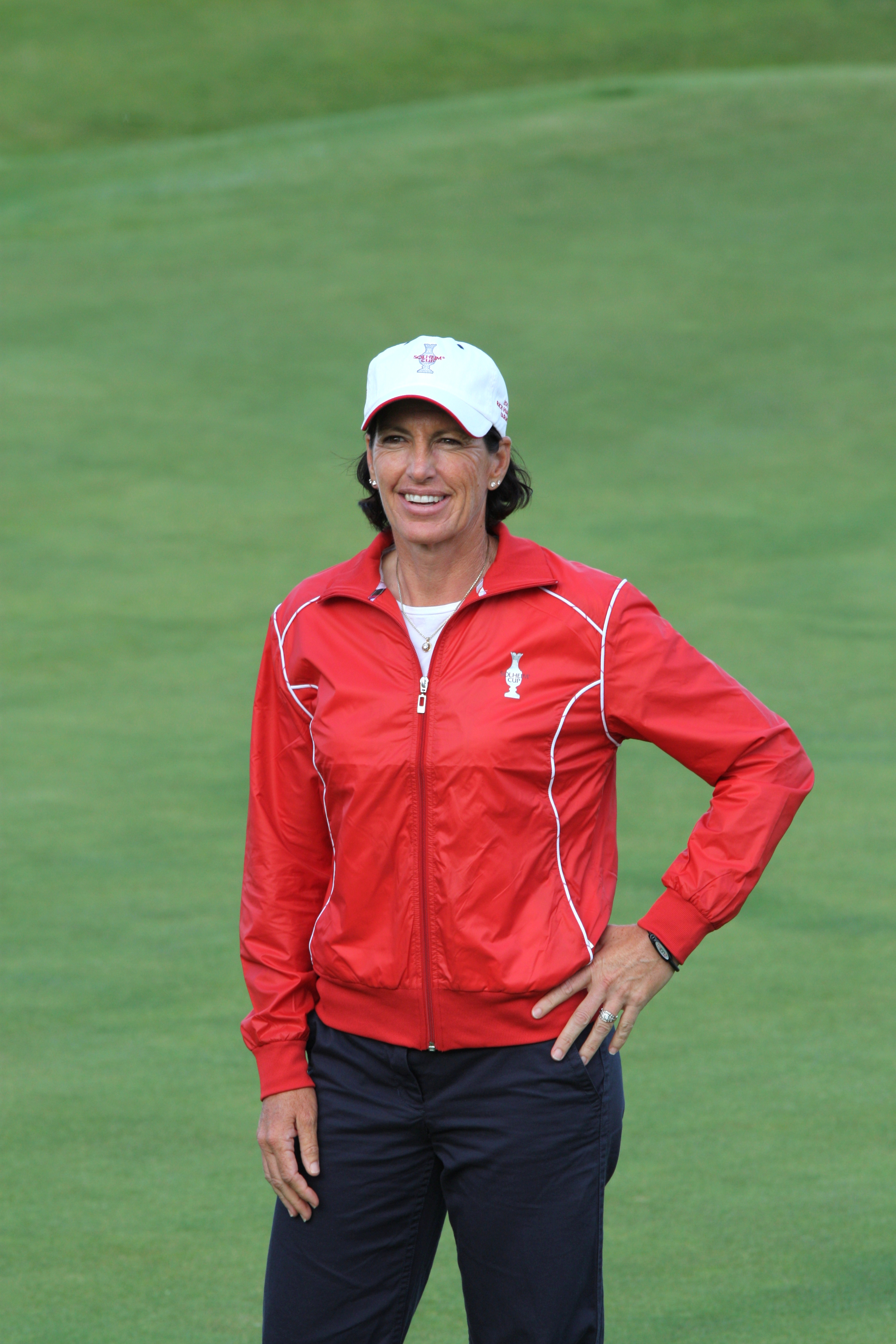
Juli Inkster

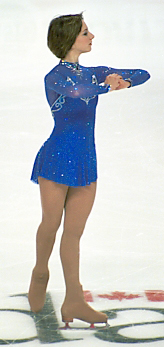
Sarah Hughes

Individual Sport Winner
Year	Winner	Nationality	Sport
1993	Julie Krone	United States	Jockey
1994	Bonnie Blair	United States	Speed skating
1995	Bonnie Blair	United States	Speed skating
1996	Amy Van Dyken	United States	Swimming
1997	Gail Devers	United States	Track and field
1998	Michelle Kwan	United States	Figure skating
1999	Juli Inkster	United States	Golf
2000	Jenny Thompson	United States	Swimming
2001	Stacy Dragila	United States	Pole vault
2002	Sarah Hughes	United States	Figure skating
2003	Natalie Coughlin	United States	Swimming
2004	Annika Sörenstam	Sweden	Golf
2005	Erin Popovich	United States	Paralympic swimming
2006	Melanie Troxel	United States	Top Fuel racing
2007	Lorena Ochoa	Mexico	Golf
2008	Nastia Liukin	United States	Artistic gymnastics
2009	Courtney Kupets	United States	Gymnastics
2010	Kim Yuna	South Korea	Figure skating
2011	Yani Tseng	Taiwan	Golf
2012	Gabrielle Douglas	United States	Artistic gymnastics
2013	Missy Franklin	United States	Swimming
2014	Simone Biles	United States	Artistic gymnastics
2015	Serena Williams	United States	Tennis
2016	Claressa Shields	United States	Boxing
2017	Katie Ledecky	United States	Swimming
2018	Oksana Masters	Ukraine	Paralympic cross-country skiing
2019	Claressa Shields	United States	Boxing
2020	Not awarded		
2021	Allyson Felix	United States	Track and field
2022	Sunisa Lee	United States	Artistic gymnastics
2023	Claressa Shields	United States	Boxing

== Team Sport Winner ==
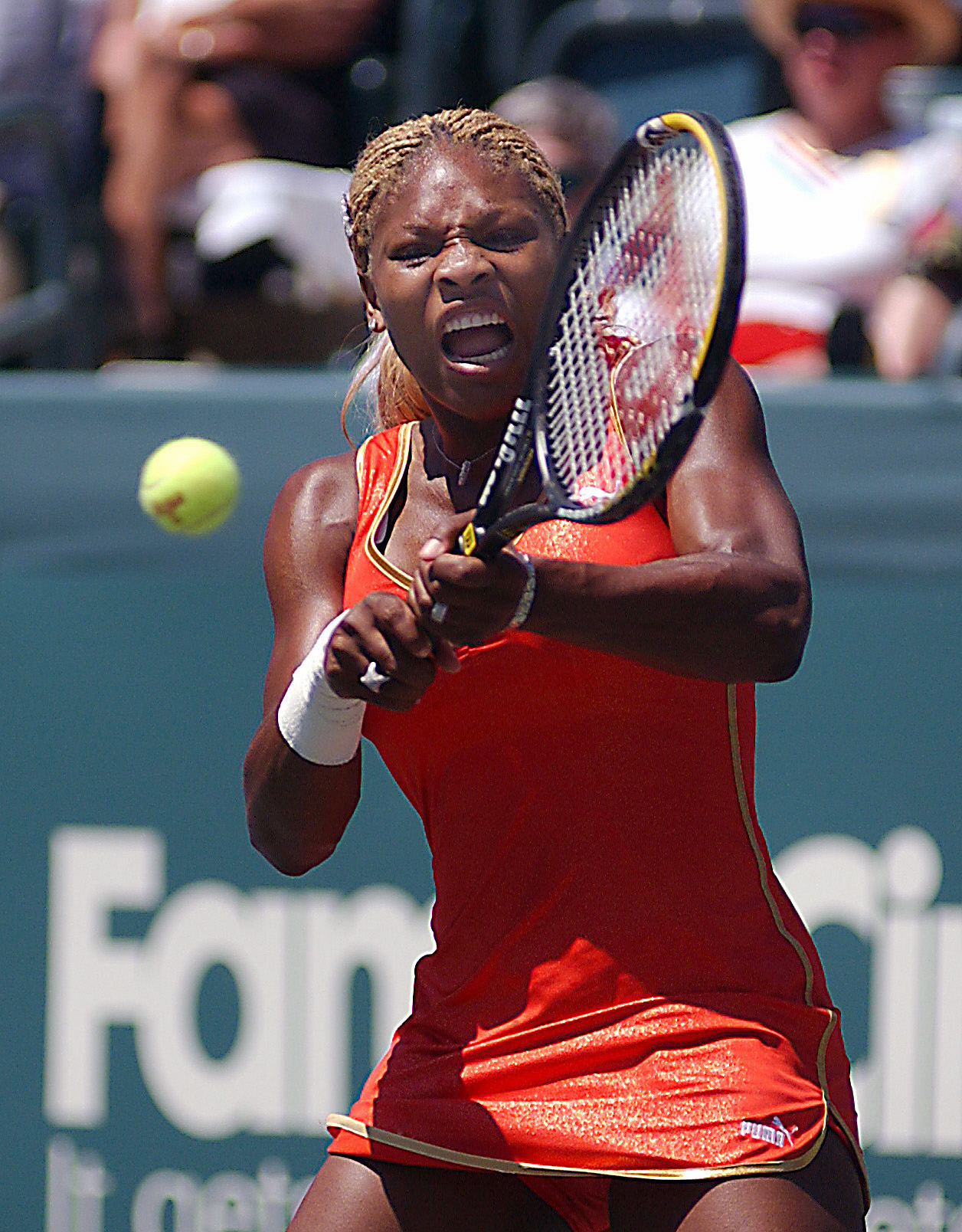
Serena Williams

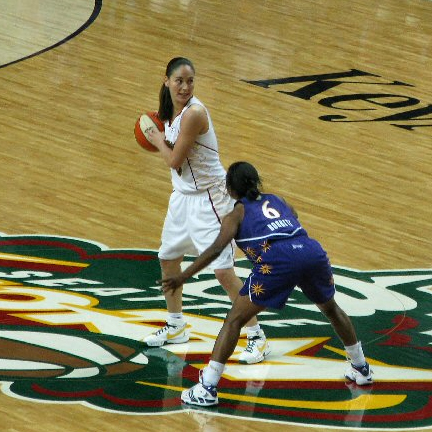
Sue Bird, on offense

Team Sport Winner
Year	Winner	Sport
1993	(United States) Sheryl Swoopes	Basketball
1994	(United States) Lisa Fernandez	Softball
1995	(United States) Rebecca Lobo	Basketball
1996	(United States) Teresa Edwards	Basketball
1997	(United States) Mia Hamm	Soccer
1998	(United States) Cynthia Cooper	Basketball
1999	(United States) Mia Hamm	Soccer
2000	(United States) Serena Williams & Venus Williams	Tennis
2001	(United States) Lisa Leslie	Basketball
2002	(United States) Sue Bird	Basketball
2003	(United States) Lisa Leslie	Basketball
2004	(United States) Misty May-Treanor & Kerri Walsh	Volleyball
2005	(United States) Cat Osterman	Softball
2006	(United States) Misty May-Treanor & Kerri Walsh	Volleyball
2007	(United States) Monica Abbott	Softball
2008	(United States) Jessica Mendoza	Softball
2009	(United States) Jessie Vetter	Hockey
2010	(United States) Katie O'Donnell	Field hockey
2011	(United States) Abby Wambach	Soccer
2012	(United States) Alex Morgan	Soccer
2013	(United States) Candace Parker	Basketball
2014	(United States) Meryl Davis	Ice dancing
2015	(United States) Carli Lloyd	Soccer
2016	(United States) Ashleigh Johnson	Water polo
2017	(United States) Maya Moore	Basketball
2018	(United States) Maddie Rooney	Hockey
2019	(United States) Megan Rapinoe	Soccer
2020	Not awarded	
2021	(United States) Jordan Larson	Volleyball
2022	(United States) Maggie Steffens	Water polo
2023	(United States) Natalie Schneider	Wheelchair basketball

== Amateur Winner ==
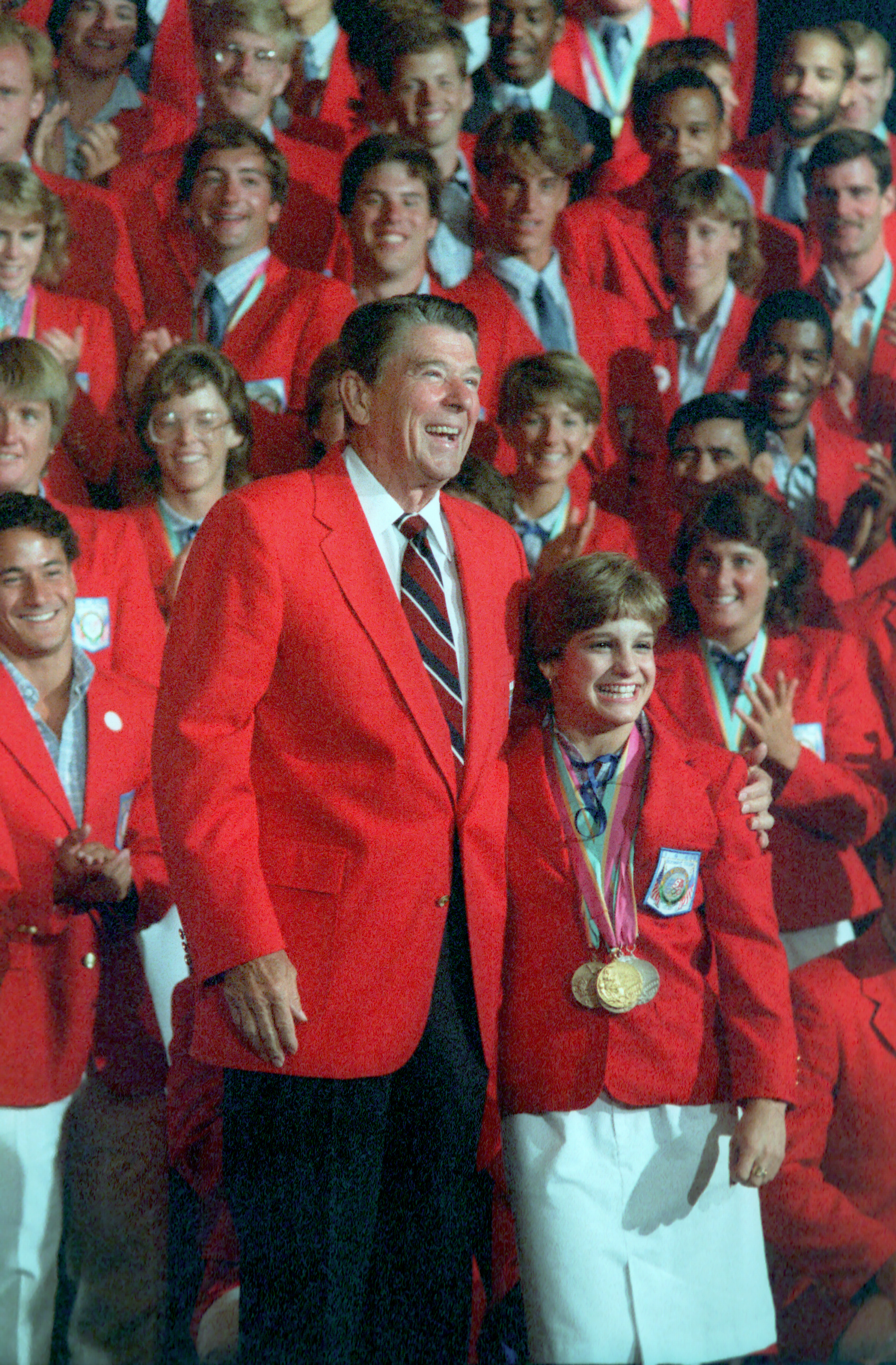
Mary Lou Retton, with President Reagan

Amateur Winner (1980–1992)
Year	Winner
1980	Mary Decker
1981	Tracy Caulkins
1982	Mary Decker
1983	Mary Decker
1984	Mary Lou Retton
1984	Joan Benoit
1985	Michele Mitchell
1986	Debi Thomas
1987	Jackie Joyner-Kersee
1988	Jackie Joyner-Kersee
1989	Janet Evans
1990	Lori Norwood
1991	Jean Driscoll
1992	Jackie Joyner-Kersee

== Professional Winner ==
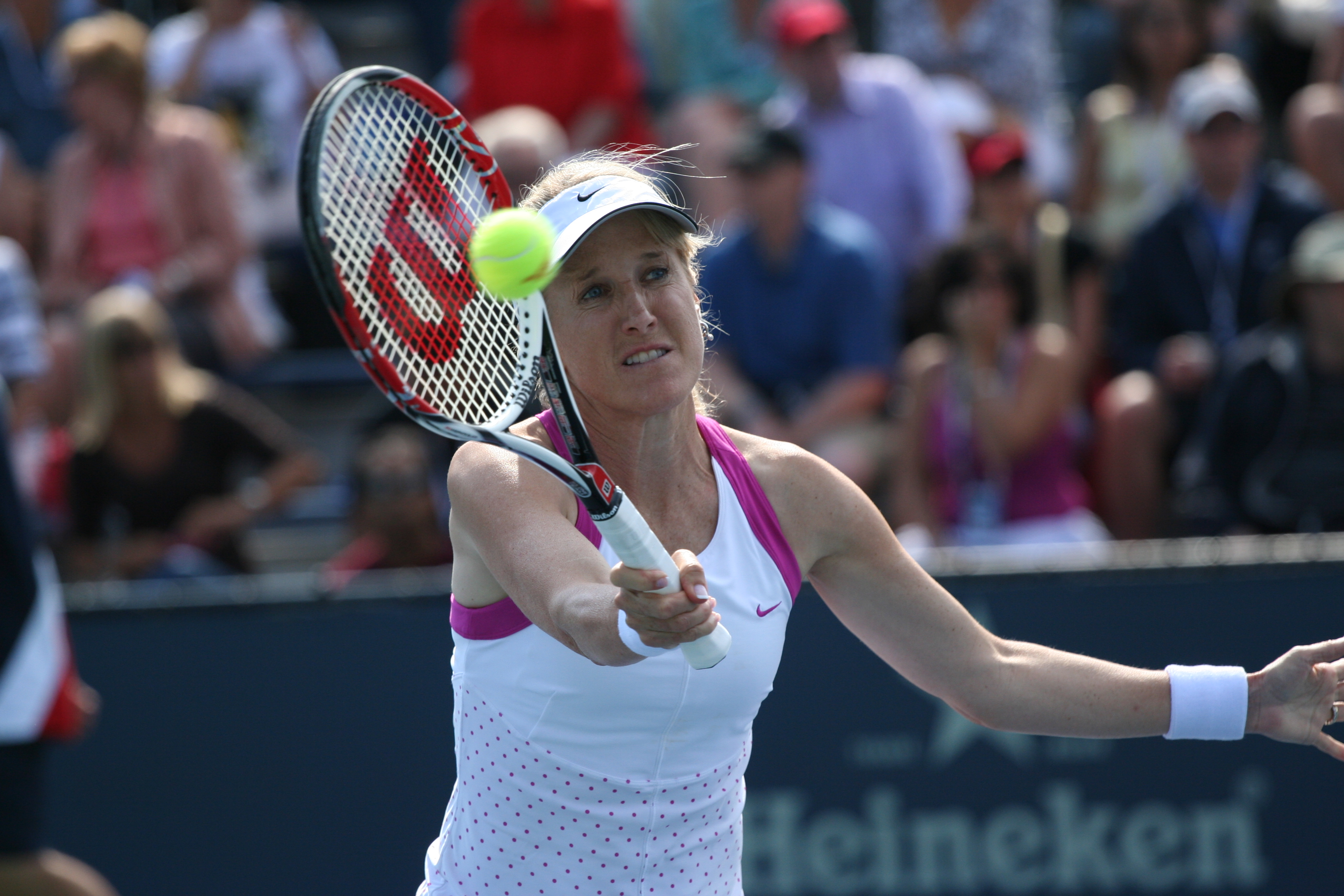
Tracy Austin

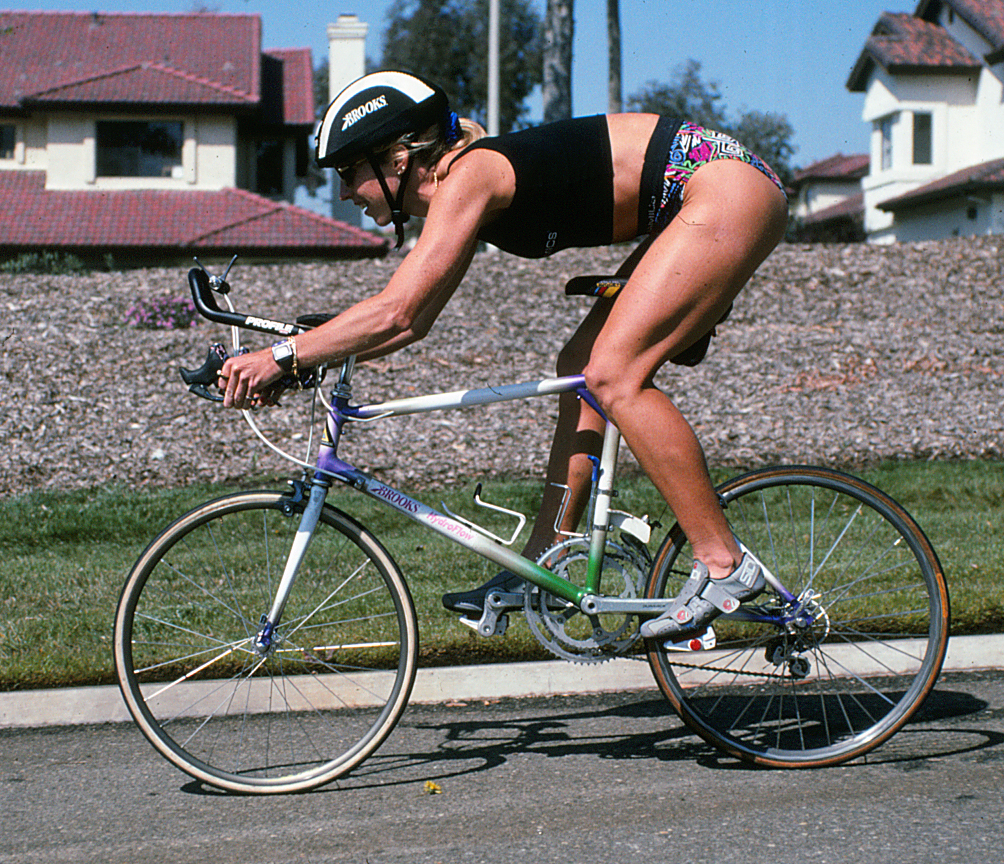
Paula Newby-Fraser

Professional Winner (1980–1992)
Year	Winner
1980	Tracy Austin
1981	Chris Evert
1982	Martina Navratilova
1983	Martina Navratilova
1984	Martina Navratilova
1985	Libby Riddles
1986	Lynette Woodard
1987	Susan Butcher
1988	Susan Butcher
1989	Steffi Graf
1990	Paula Newby-Fraser
1991	Meg Mallon
1992	Pat Bradley

== See also ==
- List of sports awards honoring women
