= List of ambassadors of the Republic of China to Saint Vincent and the Grenadines =

Coordinates: 25.035220°N 121.560678°E

Republic of China (Taiwan) Ambassador to Saint Vincent and the Grenadines
- 中華民國駐聖文森及格瑞那丁大使
- Incumbent; Baushuan Ger since October 2014
- Inaugural holder: Sun Peng-hua
- Formation: 1982; 44 years ago

The Republic of China (Taiwan) ambassador to Saint Vincent and the Grenadines is the official representative of the Republic of China to Saint Vincent and the Grenadines.

== List of representatives ==
Start date	Ambassador	Chinese language zh:中華民國駐聖文森大使列表	Observations	Premier of the People's Republic of China	Prime Minister of Saint Vincent and the Grenadines	End date
1979			The Governments in Taipai and Kingstown established diplomatic relations.	Sun Yun-suan	Milton Cato	
1982	Sun Peng-hua	董宗山	residence in Santo Domingo, Dominican Republic	Sun Yun-suan	Milton Cato	
1989	Liu Po-lun	zh:刘伯伦	with residence in St. George's, Grenada	Lee Huan	James Fitz-Allen Mitchell	
1992	Lin Tsung-hsien	林尊贤	with residence in St. George's, Grenada	Hau Pei-tsun	James Fitz-Allen Mitchell	
1994	Hsu Chi-ming	徐启明	with residence in St. George's, Grenada	Lien Chan	James Fitz-Allen Mitchell	
1997	en:David Lin	zh:林永乐	with residence in St. George's, Grenada	Vincent Siew	James Fitz-Allen Mitchell	
2001	Allan Jiang Li-shang	姜礼尚	with residence in St. George's, Grenada	Tang Fei	Arnhim Eustace	
April 2003	Elizabeth Y.F. Chu	朱玉鳳		Yu Shyi-kun	Ralph Gonsalves	
February 2006	Jack Yu-Tai Cheng	程豫台		Su Tseng-chang	Ralph Gonsalves	
May 2008	Leo Lee	李澄然		Liu Chao-shiuan	Ralph Gonsalves	
September 2010	Weber V.B. Shih	施文斌		Wu Den-yih	Ralph Gonsalves	
October 2014	Calvin C.H. Ho	葛葆萱	In 2011 he was deputy secretary-general of the Ministry of Foreign Affairs’ Department of East Asian and Pacific Affairs	Mao Chi-kuo	Ralph Gonsalves	
