= Desiree Ficker =

American triathlete and distance runner

Desirée Ficker
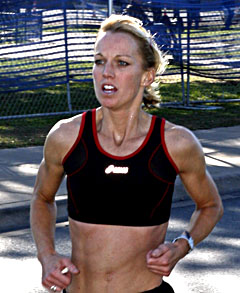

Personal information
- Born: December 9, 1976 (age 49) Potomac, Maryland, U.S.
- Height: 5 ft 7 in (1.70 m)

Sport
- Country: United States
- Turned pro: 2001
Medal record
Women's triathlon
Representing United States
Ironman World Championship
Silver medal – second place	2006	Individual

Desirée Ficker (born December 9, 1976) is an American long-distance runner and former professional triathlete.

== Personal life ==
Ficker was born in Potomac, Maryland to Annette and Robin Ficker; her father is a perennial political candidate and well-known sports heckler. She has two younger brothers, Robby and Flynn. She currently resides in Austin, Texas with her puppy, Pandora. Outside of training, she likes snowboarding, shopping for vintage clothing, camping, sewing, photography, and reading. Ficker married Matt Berry in November 2012.

== Athletic history ==
Ficker began running with her father at a very young age. Her parents were big track and field fans. She traveled with her parents to places like France and Italy to go to track and field races. She started competing in the cross country/track and field Junior Olympics when she was nine. She continued running throughout high school and college at the University of Alabama where she graduated in 1998 but became interested in triathlon from watching Ironman Kailua-Kona in Hawaii. She bought her first triathlon bike in March 1999 and qualified for Kailua-Kona that summer.

== Career ==
=== Kailua-Kona career ===
In 1999 Ficker completed Kona with a time of 11:15, and 2nd in her age group. In 2000, she took home a time of 10:45, and 2nd in her age group again. In 2006, she came in 2nd place overall at Kona, with a time of 9:24, behind Michellie Jones. In 2007, Ficker was diagnosed with strep throat before the race, but was feeling optimistic and started the race. Her swim time was 1:01:02. Her bike time was 5:14:30. Her marathon was 4:19:42. Overall, her time was 10:40:43. Her place was 643.

On 11 October 2008, Ficker finished 39th in the Women's Pro division at the Ford Ironman World Championship in a time of 11:07:48 (1:00:37 swim, 6:02:00 bike, 3:55:03 run).

=== 2007 ===
On January 28, 2007 in the 3M Austin Half Marathon, Ficker finished in a personal best 1:14:07 (5:39/mile pace) to place third behind Kathy Butler (1:11:12) and Caroline Cheptanui (1:13:55).

On February 18, 2007 in the 2007 AT&T Austin Marathon, only her second marathon raced, Ficker ran a 2:40:28 then personal best time to finish second, 42 seconds behind Moges Zebenaye of Ethiopia. This qualified her for the 2008 US Olympic Marathon Trials.

=== 2008 ===
On 18 January 2008, Ficker won the 2008 Spec-Savers South Africa 70.3 Ironman in Buffalo City in 4:46:46 (24:09 1.2 mile swim, 2:42:34 56 mile bike, 1:36:03 21.0975-kilometre (13.1094 mi) run). She finished 12 minutes ahead of the next finisher, Heidi Jesberger of Germany.

==== 2008 Olympic Trials ====
On 20 April 2008, Ficker competed in the Women's Marathon 2008 U.S. Olympic Team trials in Boston, racing for club ASICS. She finished but did not make the Olympic team, placing 79th out of 161 entrants in 2:48:11 (6:25/mile pace).

=== 2009 ===
On March 29, 2009, Ficker won the Austin Statesman Capitol 10K race for the second year in a row with a time of 34:56 (5:38 minutes/mile pace). On November 1, 2009, Ficker finished tenth in the ING New York City Marathon in a personal best time of 2:39:30 (6:05 minutes/mile pace), earning $500. She was the second fastest American woman in the race.

=== 2010 ===
On February 14, 2010, Ficker won the 8th Austin Half Marathon in 1:17:41 (5:56 minutes/mile pace), improving on her second-place finish in 2009. On April 11, 2010, Ficker won the Austin Statesman Capitol 10K race for the third year in a row with a time of 35:36 (5:44 minutes/mile pace). On November 7, 2010 she finished 45th in the ING New York City Marathon, in a time of 2:52:30 (6:36 minutes/mile pace).

=== 2011 ===
On February 20, 2011, Ficker won the 20th Austin Marathon in 2:50:35 (6:31/mile), beating the second-place finisher Jessica Mike by 11 minutes, 18 seconds. On March 27, 2011 Ficker failed to win her fourth consecutive Austin Statesman Capitol 10K race, finishing fifth with a time of 36:11 (5:50/mile).

On December 9, 2011, Ficker announced she is giving up triathlon to focus on her running career.

=== 2012 ===
Ficker did not have a qualifying time of under 2:46 in the past two years to be able to compete in the 2012 US Olympic Marathon trials in Houston on January 14, 2012.

=== 2014 ===
On May 31, 2014, Ficker won the Zooma Annapolis, Maryland Half Marathon with a time of 1:26:52.

== Personal bests ==
- Half marathon - 1:14:07 (2007 3M Half Marathon, Austin, Texas)
- Marathon - 2:39:30 (2009 New York City Marathon)
