= Julie Dibens =

British triathlete

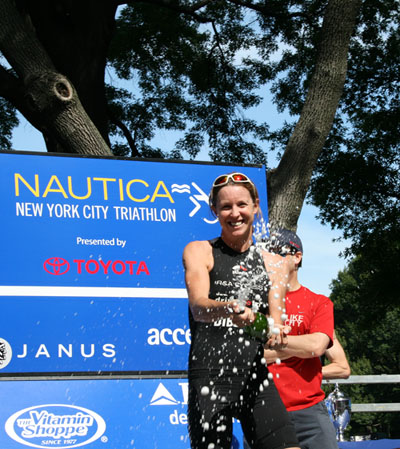
Julie at New York Tri 2007

Julie Claire Dibens (born 4 March 1975 in Salisbury, England) is a former professional triathlete. She represented Great Britain in the 2004 Summer Olympics and has won the 2009 Ironman 70.3 World Championship as well as the XTERRA Triathlon World Champion in 2007, 2008 and 2009. Dibens retired as a professional triathlete and is now a full time triathlon coach. She lives in Boulder, Colorado, USA.

== Background ==
Dibens started her sporting career in swimming, competing for Great Britain as a junior in 1991. She then received a swimming scholarship from Louisiana State University (LSU) where she obtained All American honors.

Whilst at LSU, she obtained two degrees:

- B.S. of kinesiology
- M.S. exercise physiology

After her college eligibility finished, in 1997, she began training for triathlon.

== Notable triathlon achievements ==
- Ironman Coeur D'Alene Champion - 2011
- Rev3 Quassy Champion - 2011
- XTERRA Triathlon World Championship 2nd - 2010
- Ironman World Championship 3rd - 2010
- 70.3 World Champion - 2009
- XTERRA Triathlon World Champion - 2007, 2008, 2009
- Abu Dhabi International Triathlon Champion - 2010, 2011
- Wildflower Triathlon Champion - 2010
- UK Xterra Champion - 2007, 2008, 2009
- World Champion (amateur female) - 1998
- World Championships 8th - 2004
- Olympics 30th - 2004 Summer Olympics
- Great Britain Amateur of the Year - 1998
- USTS Series Champion - 1999
- European Championship Bronze Medalist - 2000
- British National Champion - 2007
- St. Croix 70.3 Champion - 2007
- UK 70.3 Champion - 2007
- Swiss 70.3 Champion - 2008
- London Triathlon Champion - 2008
- 2008 Ironman 70.3 World Championships 4th
- Boulder 5430 Long Course Champion - 2009
- Olympic Qualifier 2000 Summer Olympics

Dibens qualified for both the 2000 and 2004 Olympics but was forced to withdraw from the 2000 Games because of a knee injury.
