= Simon Thompson (triathlete) =

Australian triathlete

Simon Thompson (born 10 December 1977, in Melbourne) is an athlete from Australia. He competes in triathlon.

Thompson trains with the Tridents Triathlon Club in Canberra and is coached by Ben Gathercole.

Thompson competed at the second Olympic triathlon at the 2004 Summer Olympics. He placed tenth with a total time of 1:52:47.18.

Thompson, who was named as the reserve for the Australian Melbourne Commonwealth Games 2006 team, competed in the place of Greg Bennett. Bennett withdrew due to injury. Thompson placed 11th in this race. He controlled much of the race to assist his Australian teammates, Brad Kahlefeldt (1st) and Peter Robertson (3rd).

Other notable achievements include Triathlon World Cup victory at Mooloolaba 2005 and winning the Australian long course title 2005.

Simon is sponsored by Avanti Bikes. He was an Australian Institute of Sport scholarship holder.
