= 3M Half Marathon =

Annual half marathon in Austin, Texas, US

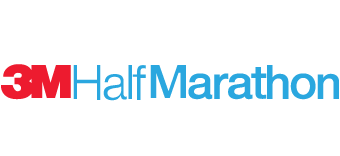
- The old 3M Half Marathon logo
- Location: Austin, Texas
- Event type: Road
- Distance: Half Marathon
- Established: 1995
- Website: https://downhilltodowntown.com/

The Spurs Austin International Half Marathon, formerly known as the 3M Half Marathon, is an annual half marathon held in Austin, Texas, United States.

The marathon boasts one of the fastest 21.098 km (13.110 mi) courses in the country. Runners enjoy a point-to-point course with mostly downhill running. Starting in north Austin and finishing near the Texas State Capitol, the course has a net elevation drop of more than 300 feet. As a result, the event has adapted the tagline "Downhill to Downtown." Because the net elevation drop exceeds a ration of 1:1,000, times recorded in the race are ineligible for world record consideration and for entry standards in World Athletics events. High Five Events based out of Austin, produces the Austin International Half and the Austin Marathon.

== Recognition ==
- Named "Best Schwag" by Runner's World in 2008 for legendary goodie bag.
- Named "Best Road Race" in 2013, 2016, 2017 by AFM Annual "Best Of" Awards.
- Named by Runner's World as one of The Year's Best Half Marathons
- Named Austin Race of the Year (15K & longer) by Austin runners in 2007 and 2002
- Selected by Competition Texas magazine as the top half marathon in 2006

Year	Men's winner	Time (h:m:s)	Women's winner	Time (h:m:s)
2025	Jordan West (USA)	01:05:44	Katie Watson (USA)	01:15:44
2024	Jordan West (USA)	01:05:44	Katie Watson (USA)	01:15:44
2023	Joseph Gray (USA)	01:04:23	Allie Kieffer (USA)	01:16:24
2022	Will Nation (2) (USA)	01:04:36	Sarah Jackson (USA)	01:15:47
2021	No Race held due to COVID-19			
2020	David Fuentes (USA)	01:06:31	Jess Harper (3) (USA)	01:13:41
2019	Michael Morris (USA)	01:07:19	Jess Harper (2) (USA)	01:14:23
2018	Joey Whelan (USA)	01:09:06	Jess Harper (USA)	01:15:45
2017	Mark Pinales (USA)	01:06:51	Lauren Smith Stroud (USA)	01:17:07
2016	Jared Carson (USA)	01:08:23	Kristen Zaitz (USA)	01:13:51
2015	Will Nation (USA)	01:07:01	Allison Macsas (USA)	01:13:02
2014	Erik Stanley (USA)	01:06:38	Kelly Williamson (3) (USA)	01:16:34
2013	Matt Davis (USA)	01:02:49	Kelly Williamson (2) (USA)	01:16:18
2012	Scott Rantall (USA)	01:07:13	Kelly Williamson (USA)	01:14:41
2011	Christian Hesch (USA)	01:07:40	Kelly Dworak (USA)	01:33:22
2010	Jordan Jones (USA)	01:09:08	Michelle Corkum (USA)	01:22:11
2009	Martin Fagan (IRE)	01:01:05	Belaynesh Gebre (ETH)	01:11:17
2008	Ridouane Harroufi (MAR)	01:03:12	Jacqueline Nyetipei (KEN)	01:09:35
2007	Alene Reta (ETH)	01:01:46	Kathy Butler (SCT)	01:11:12
2006	Nicodemus Malakwen (KEN)	01:01:45	Soon Duk Kang (KOR)	01:10:02
2005	Brian Sell (USA)	01:02:59	Angélica Sánchez (MEX)	01:13:26
2004	John Gwako (KEN)	01:02:14	Sylvia Mosqueda (USA)	01:09:53
2003	Andrew Letherby (USA)	01:03:31	Zivile Balciunaite (LIT)	01:13:18
