= Fraser Cartmell =

Scottish triathlete (born 1982)

Fraser Cartmell (born 16 June 1982 in Inverness, Scotland) is a professional triathlete, multiple Scottish champion, three time Ironman 70.3 UK winner, and Ironman UK 2010 winner.

== Results ==
YEAR	RACE	POSITION	SWIM	BIKE	RUN	RESULT
2011	Ironman 70.3 Racine	4th	24:32	2:11:45	1:26:16	4:04:58
2010	Ironman World Championship	30th	51:26	4:39:46	3:12:00	8:47:45
2010	Ironman UK	1st	43:34	5:02:47	2:49:55	8:40:17
2010	Ironman 70.3 UK, Wimbleball Lake, UK	1st	22:55	2:33:38	1:17:06	4:17:03
2010	TriGrandPrix UK	1st	26:07	2:17:36	1:12:21	03:57:54
2010	Ironman 70.3 St. Croix, US Virgin Islands	5th	24:58	2:22:55	1:25:14	4:13:07
2010	Abu Dhabi Triathlon, Abu Dhabi, United Arab Emirates	4th	?	?	?	6:36:12
2010	Ironman 70.3 South Africa, Buffalo City, RSA	1st	23:15	2:23:48	1:17:41	4:07:54
2009	Ironman 70.3 World Championship, Clearwater	20th	21:48	1:59:28	1:19:31	3:44:21
2009	Ironman 70.3 Austin, Texas	11th	22:59	2:10:04	1:20:10	3:57:07
2009	Ironman 70.3 Antwerp, Belgium	7th	21:11	2:07:32	1:18:21	3:48:55
2009	Sabic Triathlon, Maastricht, Netherlands	1st	?	?	?	?
2009	Ironman 70.3 UK, Wimbleball Lake, UK	3rd	23:34	2:33:43	1:20:09	4:20:37
2009	Ironman 70.3 Florida, FL, USA	DNF	25:42	2:11:09	---	---
2009	Wildflower Long Course Triathlon, CA, USA	13th	22:52	2:21:15	1:29:29	4:16:04
2009	Ironman 70.3 California, Oceanside, CA, USA	DNF	22:27	2:14:58	---	---
2009	Miami International Triathlon, Miami, FL, USA	8th	17:23	56:43	36:03	1:52:16
2009	Ironman 70.3 South Africa, Buffalo City, RSA	2nd	22:36	2:21:48	1:16:28	4:04:07
2008	Ironman 70.3 World Championship, Clearwater	10th	22:09	2:02:24	1:18:21	3:46:34
2008	Ironman UK, Sherbourne, UK	DNF	45:52	5:09:07	---	---
2008	Ironman 70.3 Timberman, New Hampshire, USA	2nd	24:03	2:16:29	1:19:52	4:02:24
2008	Ironman 70.3 UK, Wimbleball Lake, UK	1st	22:36	2:36:46	1:14:48	4:17:39
2008	Wildflower Long Course Triathlon, CA, USA	5th	22:06	2:21:00	1:18:52	4:04:51
2008	Ironman 70.3 California, Oceanside, CA, USA	8th	23:14	2:19:03	1:21:51	4:07:33
2008	Ironman 70.3 South Africa, Buffalo City, RSA	3rd	18:33	2:27:46	1:21:00	4:10:40
2007	Ironman 70.3 World Championship, Clearwater, FL, USA	7th	23:09	2:04:29	1:17:16	3:49:03
2007	Ironman 70.3 UK, Wimbleball Lake, UK	1st	22:28	2:36:35	1:22:14	4:24:32
2007	ITU Long Distance Triathlon World Championships, Lorient, France	12th	36:55	1:50:03	1:10:13	3:40:03
