= Domenico Passuello =

Italian bicycle racer (born 1978)

Personal information
- Born: 24 March 1978 (age 48) Livorno, italy
- Cycling career
- Sport: Cycling

Professional teams
- 2001: Amore & Vita–Beretta
- 2002: Colombia–Selle Italia
- 2003: Quick-Step–Davitamon
- 2004–2005: Amore & Vita–Beretta

Sport
- Country: Italy
- Sport: Triathlon, road cycling

Domenico Passuello (born 24 March 1978) is an Italian professional triathlete and former road cyclist.

His father Giuseppe was also a professional cyclist.

== Triathlon results ==
| Year | Competition | Location | Place | Time |
|---|---|---|---|---|
| 2017 | Ironman 70.3 Bintan | Indonesia | 2 | 3h 57' 19" |
| 2017 | Ironman 70.3 Qujing | China | 1 | 3h 54' 3" |
| 2016 | Ironman 70.3 Lanzarote | Spain | 3 | 4h 15' 43" |
| 2015 | Ironman 70.3 Putrajaya | Malaysia | 1 | 3h 58' 17" |
| 2015 | Ironman 70.3 Italy | Italy | 3 | 4h 9' 55" |
| 2015 | Challenge Philippines | Philippines | 1} | 4h 4' 22" |
| 2015 | Ironman Taiwan | Taiwan | 1 | 8h 25' 55" |
| 2014 | Ironman Los Cabos | Mexico | 3 | 8h 34' 18" |
| 2014 | Challenge Sardinia | Italy | 1 | 3h 56' 24" |
| 2014 | Challenge Rimini | Italy | 1 | 4h 3' 1" |
| 2013 | Ironman 70.3 Lanzarote | Spain | 3 | 4h 12' 45" |
| 2012 | Ironman 70.3 South Africa | South Africa | 3 | 4h 18' 37" |
| 2011 | National Long-Distance Championship | Italy | 1 | |
| 2009 | Ironman 70.3 Putrajaya | Malaysia | 2 | |

== Cycling career ==
=== Major results ===
2002
4th Tour du Lac Leman
6th Giro d'Oro
9th Overall Brixia Tour
2003
9th Route Adélie
2004
6th Giro d'Oro
7th Trofeo dell'Etna
9th Tour du Lac Leman
2005
3rd Trofeo Franco Balestra
