= Andrea Bowman =

Saint Vincent and the Grenadines politician, diplomat

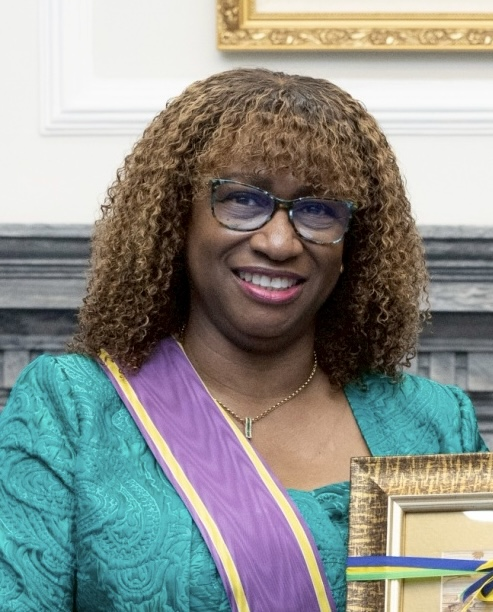

1st Ambassador of Saint Vincent and the Grenadines to Taiwan
- Incumbent
- Assumed office 1 August 2019
- Prime Minister: Ralph Gonsalves; Godwin Friday
- Preceded by: Position established

Personal details
- Profession: Educator; Diplomat

Andrea Bowman is an educator and diplomat from Saint Vincent and the Grenadines, who was appointed the first ambassador to Taiwan in 2019.

== Career ==
Bowman spent more than 40 years as an educator, working at institutions such as: St. Vincent's Grammar School, St. Vincent's Normal College, St. Vincent's Girls' High School and Trinity Medical Sciences University, before retiring in 2017.

Bowman was appointed the first Ambassador of Saint Vincent and the Grenadines to Taiwan from 1 August 2019. On 7 August 2019, she and Prime Minister Ralph Gonsalves visited the Presidential Office of the Republic of China in Taipei, where they held a summit meeting between the two countries. The following day, on the 8th, the first Embassy of Saint Vincent and the Grenadines of the Republic of China was established.

Bowman has been outspoken on how Saint Vincent and the Grenadines supports the recognition of Taiwan by the UN Security Council. She also been exploring potential trade agreements, including the export of SVG's seafood to the country.
