= Erin O'Hara =

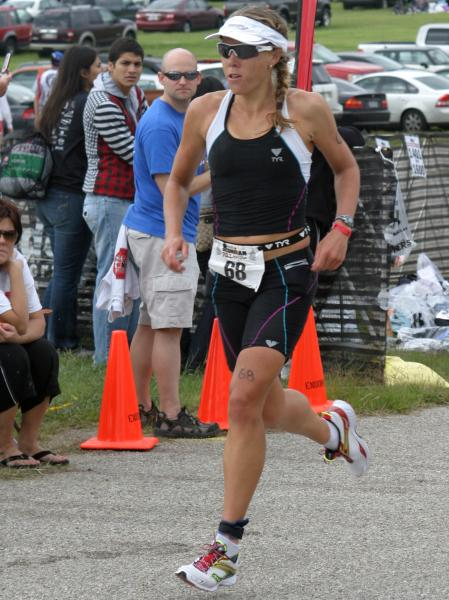
- O'Hara in 2009
- Born: 23 September 1983 (age 42); New Zealand
- Known for: Yoga Teacher

Erin O'Hara (born 23 September 1983) is a former professional triathlete and kundalini yoga teacher from New Zealand.

O'Hara had some successes in 2009 and 2010, placing third in the Women's Division at the Putrajaya, Malaysia Triathlon during the 2009 Ironman 70.3 Series. She also placed third in the Women's Division at the St. Croix Triathlon during the 2010 Ironman 70.3 Series.

Some of her classes are appearing in some places.
