= Sofie Goos =

Belgian triathlete

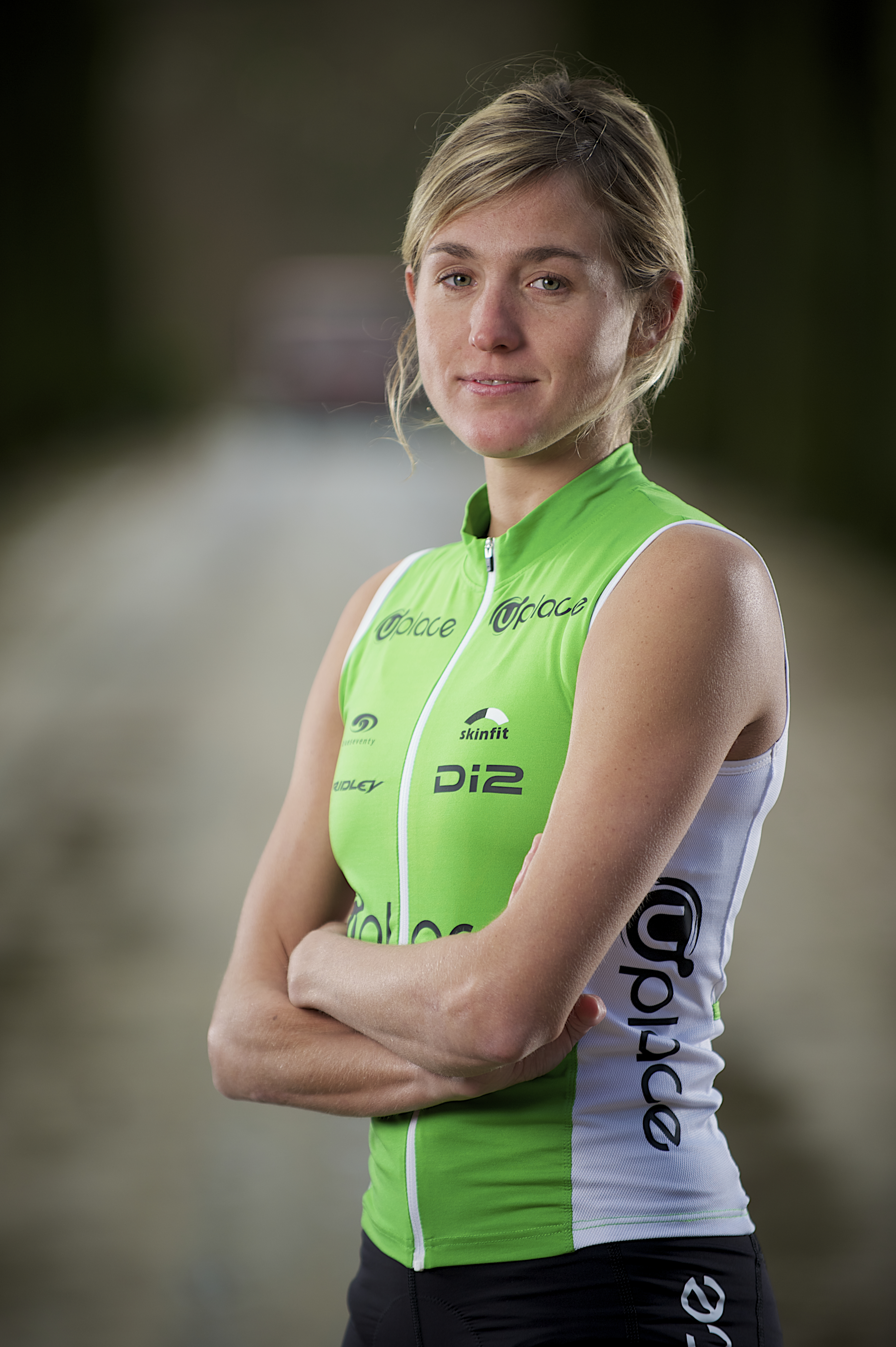

Personal information
- Nickname: "La Goos"
- Born: 6 May 1980 (age 46) Turnhout, Belgium

Sport
- Country: Belgium
- Team: Uplace Triathlon Team
- Turned pro: February 2009
- Coached by: Bart Decru

Sofie Goos (born 6 May 1980 in Turnhout, Belgium) is a Belgian triathlete who is a member of the Uplace Pro Triathlon Team. Goos made her big break into the sport in 2008 with wins in Ibiza, Knokke, Mechelen and Kapelle o/d Bos. In 2009, Goos won numerous races, including the Barcelona Challenge and the Florida Ironman. In Belgium, she was victorious in the 70.3 Antwerp Ironman, and in Brasschaat, Geel, Bruges, Kapelle o/d Bos and Ypres. In 2010, she won long-distance races in Lisbon and Antwerp and the Olympic Distance triathlons of Geel, Bruges Brasschaat and Knokke. In 2008 and 2009, she was nominated for Female Belgian Athlete of the Year. Goos joined the Uplace Pro Triathlon Team in 2010, allowing her to become a full-time professional triathlete. She is also a member of the Antwerp ATRIAC club.

== Stabbing incident ==
Goos was stabbed without any reason on 15 May 2016 by an unknown man during training in Antwerp, forcing her to be treated in intensive care.

== Results ==
- 2007: 6th Ironman Switzerland
- 2008: Gold 1/4 triatlon Kapelle-op-den-Bos
- 2008: Gold 3/4 Triathlon Ibiza
- 2008: 7th Ironman Lanzarote - 10:30.41
- 2009: Gold Ironman Florida - 9:08.38
- 2009: Gold 1/1 Triathlon Barcelona
- 2009: Gold 1/2 Triathlon Antwerp
- 2009: Gold 1/4 triathlon Kapelle-op-den-Bos
- 2009: Gold 1/4 Triathlon Bruges
- 2009: Gold 1/2 Triathlon Brasschaat
- 2010: Gold 1/2 Triathlon Lisbon
- 2010: 14th triathlon Abu dhabi
- 2010: Silver 1/2 Triathlon Barcelona
- 2010: Gold 1/4 Triathlon Geel
- 2010: 7th 1/2 Triathlon Hawaii
- 2010: Gold 1/4 Triathlon Bruges
- 2010: Gold 1/4 Triathlon Brasschaat
- 2010: Gold 1/2 Triathlon Antwerp
- 2010: Gold 1/4 Triathlon Knokke
- 2010: 4th Ironman Cozumel
