= Philip Graves (triathlete) =

British triathlete (born 1989)

Philip Graves (born 7 April 1989 in York) is a British triathlete. In 2009, he became the youngest triathlete to win an Ironman competition, at age 20, when he won the Ironman UK race.

== Results ==
YEAR	RACE	POSITION	SWIM	BIKE	RUN	RESULT
2009	Ironman World Championship	41st	50:06	4:44:25	3:37:35	9:16:02
2009	Ironman UK	1st	51:08	4:57:22	2:52:18	8:45:51
2009	Ironman 70.3 UK	1st	23:36	2:29:24	01:19:36	4:15:58
