= Falmouth Road Race =

Annual running race in Massachusetts, US

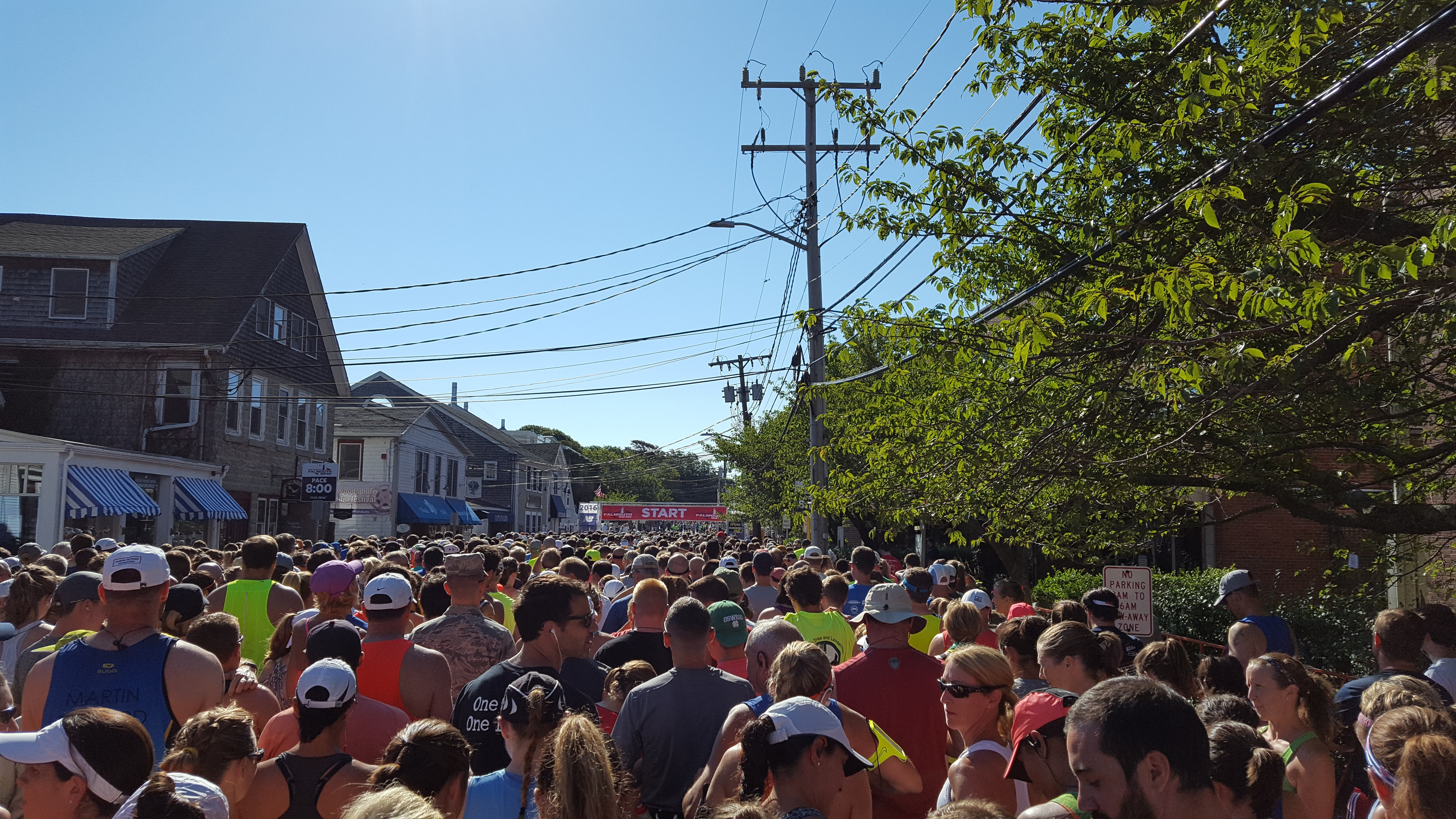
- The 2016 starting line.
- Date: August
- Location: Woods Hole to Falmouth, Massachusetts, USA
- Distance: 7 miles (11 km)
- Primary sponsor: ASICS
- Established: August 15, 1973
- Organizer: Falmouth Road Race, Inc.
- Website: Official website
- Participants: 12,800

The Falmouth Road Race is an annual 7.0-mile (11.3 km) road race run from Woods Hole to Falmouth Heights in the town of Falmouth, Massachusetts on Cape Cod. The race is one of the premier non-marathon races in the country, with a field typically including many of the best American and international runners, including both past and future Olympic athletes.

The race is organized by Falmouth Road Race, Inc., a nonprofit that uses profits to benefit local charities. The race director is Dave McGillivray. In 2021, ASICS became the race title sponsor.

== History ==
The race was the idea of Tommy Leonard, an avid runner and popular bartender in Boston and Falmouth. During the 1972 Summer Olympics, Leonard closed his bar in order to watch Frank Shorter win the first Olympic marathon for the United States since 1908. After Shorter won the marathon Leonard was quoted as saying "Wouldn't it be fantastic if we could get Frank Shorter to run in a race on Cape Cod?" One year later, in the summer of 1973, with the help of the town's recreation director Rich Sherman, and a local high school track coach John Carroll, the first Falmouth Road Race was run by approximately 100 people. The next year there were 445 runners, and the year after that Frank Shorter joined 850 other runners in the race, bringing Leonard's wish true. Today the ASICS Falmouth Road Race is considered one of the premier non-marathon races in the country, if not the world, attracting over 10,000 runners each year. The field of runners typically includes many of the best American and international runners, including both past and future Olympic athletes.

== Entry ==
More people apply for places than can be accommodated in the race, so a random selection process is held to select the field of runners. The application period is a short window of time during the first half of May. Applications must be submitted online on the race website. A number of places are especially reserved for Falmouth residents. Five runners, celebrated through the years as "The Falmouth Five" Mike Bennett, Tom Brannelly, Don Delinks, Ron Pokraka and Brian Salzberg, have officially completed 46 consecutive Falmouth Road Races.

== Course ==
The beginning of the course is extremely hilly, with a starting line by the Captain Kidd Restaurant & Bar in Woods Hole, and a finish by the Falmouth Heights beach. From the start corral, one races up a gradually steepening incline and into a narrow wooded road, emerging onto a long curved coastal stretch that runs by Nobska Light, continuing along a wooded road with gentle rolling hills, emerging onto Surf Drive along a hot beach on Martha's Vineyard Sound, past beach cottages on stilts, before turning inland toward the center of Falmouth town, along Falmouth Harbor, and finally looping back to the shore route for one last 1/4-mile (400 m) hill that crests just before the finish.

Before 2006, promotional materials usually described the Falmouth Road Race as a 7.1-mile (11.4 km) event. In 2006, it was measured and certified to be 7 miles (11 km).

== Winners ==
Key: Course record

Edition	Year	Men's winner	Time (m:s)	Women's winner	Time (m:s)
54th	2026	Habtom Samuel (ERI)	30:53	Pamela Kosgei (KEN)	35:25
53rd	2025	Amon Kemboi (KEN)	31:12	Melknat Sharew (ETH)	36:03
52nd	2024	John Korir (KEN)	31:15	Fantaye Belayneh (ETH)	36:10
51st	2023	Wesley Kiptoo (KEN)	31:08	Hellen Obiri (KEN)	35:13
50th	2022	Ben Flanagan (CAN)	32:25	Keira D'Amato (USA)	36:14
49th	2021	Ben Flanagan (CAN)	32:16	Edna Kiplagat (KEN)	36:52
47th	2019	Leonard Korir (USA)	32:11	Sharon Lokedi (KEN)	36:29
46th	2018	Ben Flanagan (CAN)	32:21	Caroline Chepkoech (KEN)	35:48
45th	2017	Stephen Sambu (KEN)	32:14	Caroline Chepkoech (KEN)	35:53
44th	2016	Stephen Sambu (KEN)	32:10	Caroline Chepkoech (KEN)	36:25
43rd	2015	Stephen Sambu (KEN)	32:17	Diane Nukuri (BDI)	36:47
42nd	2014	Stephen Sambu (KEN)	31:46	Betsy Saina (KEN)	35:56
41st	2013	Micah Kogo (KEN)	32:10	Joyce Chepkirui (KEN)	36:43
40th	2012	Stanley Biwott (KEN)	31:59	Margaret Muriuki (KEN)	36:54
39th	2011	Lucas Rotich (KEN)	31:37	Magdalena Lewy-Boulet (USA)	36:58
38th	2010	Gebregziabher Gebremariam (ETH)	32:20	Wude Ayalew (ETH)	35:46
37th	2009	Tilahun Regassa (ETH)	31:41	Mamitu Daska (ETH)	36:23
36th	2008	Tadese Tola (ETH)	32:01	Edith Masai (KEN)	37:02
35th	2007	Micah Kogo (KEN)	31:53	Catherine Ndereba (KEN)	36:31
34th	2006	Gilbert Okari (KEN)	31:53	Alevtina Ivanova (RUS)	35:43
33rd	2005	Gilbert Okari (KEN)	31:59	Lornah Kiplagat (NED)	36:13
32nd	2004	Gilbert Okari (KEN)	31:08	Alevtina Ivanova (RUS)	36:13
31st	2003	John Kipsang (KEN)	31:59	Jennifer Rhines (USA)	37:08
30th	2002	James Koskei (KEN)	32:10	Lornah Kiplagat (KEN)	35:13
29th	2001	John Kipsang (KEN)	32:26	Lornah Kiplagat (KEN)	36:26
28th	2000	Mark Yatich (KEN)	31:43	Lornah Kiplagat (KEN)	35:02
27th	1999	John Kipsang (KEN)	32:06	Catherine Ndereba (KEN)	36:32
26th	1998	Khalid Khannouchi (MAR)	31:48	Catherine Ndereba (KEN)	36:10
25th	1997	Khalid Khannouchi (MAR)	31:58	Colleen De Reuck (USA)	36:19
24th	1996	Joseph Kimani (KEN)	31:36	Catherine Ndereba (KEN)	35:37
23rd	1995	Joseph Kamau (KEN)	32:10	Delilah Asiago (KEN)	36:23
22nd	1994	Benson Masya (KEN)	31:59	Laura Mykytok (USA)	37:01
21st	1993	Simon Karori (KEN)	32:30	Colleen De Reuck (USA)	36:42
20th	1992	Benson Masya (KEN)	31:52	Lynn Jennings (USA)	36:13
19th	1991	Steve Kogo (KEN)	32:14	Sabrina Dornhoefer (USA)	37:32
18th	1990	Salvatore Bettiol (ITA)	32:55	Aurora Cunha (POR)	36:39
17th	1989	Salvatore Bettiol (ITA)	32:14	Aurora Cunha (POR)	36:21
16th	1988	Mark Curp (USA)	32:22	Anne Hannam (NZL)	36:36
15th	1987	Rolando Vera (ECU)	32:19	Aurora Cunha (POR)	36:59
14th	1986	Arturo Barrios (MEX)	32:17	Lorraine Moller (NZL)	36:54
13th	1985	David Murphy (USA)	32:02.3	Joan Benoit (USA)	36:17.7
12th	1984	David Murphy (USA)	32:17	Joan Nesbit (USA)	37:00
11th	1983	Joseph Nzau (KEN)	32:20	Joan Benoit (USA)	36:21
10th	1982	Alberto Salazar (USA)	31:53.3	Joan Benoit (USA)	36:33.7
9th	1981	Alberto Salazar (USA)	31:55.6	Joan Benoit (USA)	38:15.5
8th	1980	Rod Dixon (NZL)	32:20.4	Grete Waitz (NOR)	37:12.3
7th	1979	Craig Virgin (USA)	32:19.7	Ellison Goodall (USA)	38:16
6th	1978	Bill Rodgers (USA)	32:21	Joan Benoit (USA)	39:07
5th	1977	Bill Rodgers (USA)	32:23	Kim Merritt (USA)	38:40
4th	1976	Frank Shorter (USA)	33:14	Joan Benoit (USA)	43:08
3rd	1975	Frank Shorter (USA)	33:24	Jennifer Tuthill (USA)	44:23
2nd	1974	Bill Rodgers (USA)	34:16	Debbie Richie (USA)	44:31
1st	1973	Dave Duba (USA)	39:16	Jennifer Tuthill (USA)	47:23

=== Wheelchair division ===
The race also has a wheelchair division with course records held by Daniel Romanchuck, USA, at 21:58 and Tatyana McFadden, USA, at 26:15, both set in 2019.
