= Bay to Breakers =

Annual footrace in San Francisco, California

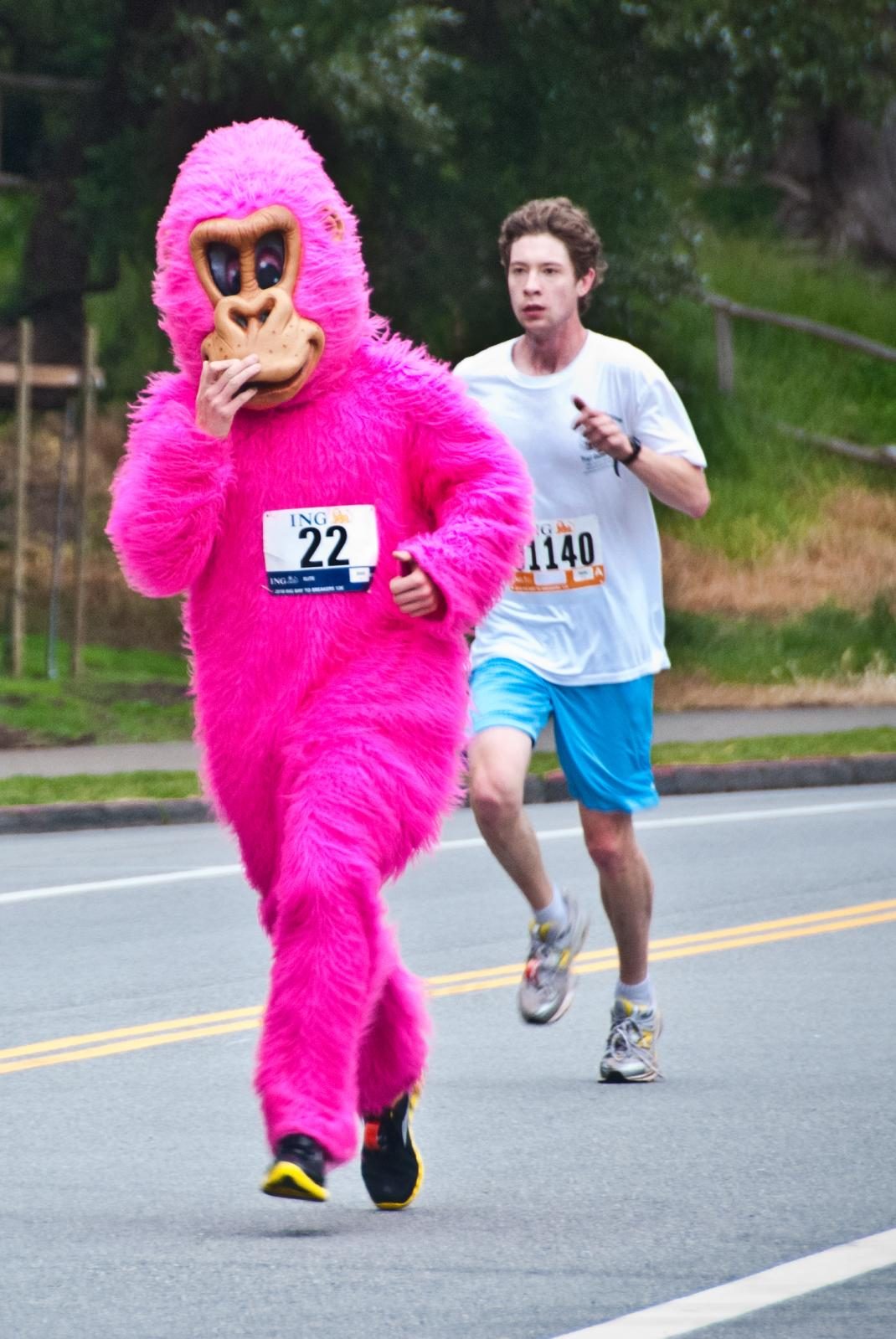
- Participants in the 2010 race
- Date: Third Sunday in May
- Location: San Francisco, California, US
- Event type: Road
- Distance: 12 km
- Established: 1912
- Course records: Men: 33:31 (2009); Sammy Kitwara; Women: 38:07 (2010); Lineth Chepkurui
- Website: http://baytobreakers.com/

Bay to Breakers is an annual footrace in San Francisco, California, typically on the third Sunday of May. The phrase "Bay to Breakers" reflects the fact that the race starts at the northeast end of the downtown area a few blocks from The Embarcadero (adjacent to San Francisco Bay) and runs west through the city to finish at the Great Highway (adjacent to the Pacific coast, where breakers crash onto Ocean Beach). The complete course is 7.46 miles (12 km) long.

Bay to Breakers is well known for many participants wearing costumes. The 1986 edition set a Guinness World Record for being the world's largest footrace with 110,000 participants, until that was surpassed by the 2010 City2Surf event in Sydney. Attendance in 2015 was reported at roughly 50,000. Attendance in 2025 was around 25,000.

== History ==
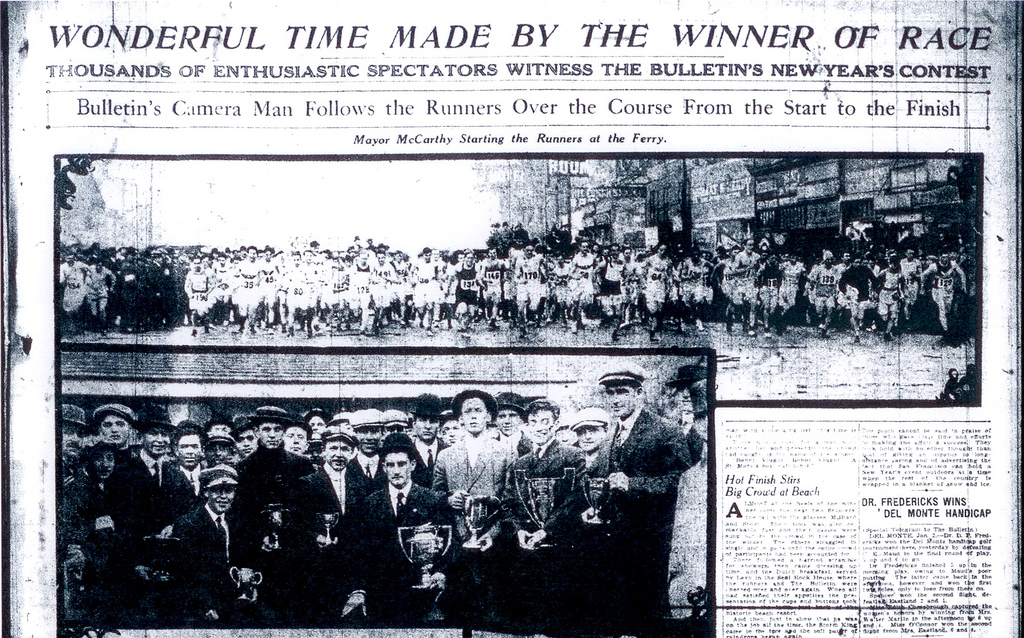
Newspaper account of the first race in 1912

Inspired by similar races back East, the event began on New Year's Day in 1912 as a way to promote the "land of sunshine, fruit, and flowers" while the rest of the country lay 'blanketed with snow.". It has been run for more consecutive years over a given course and length than has any other footrace in the world (other footraces are older and have been run for more consecutive years, but their courses and lengths have changed over time). During World War II participation sometimes slipped below 50 registrants, but the tradition carried on. In 1975, the race was on television for the first time in the documentary "See how They Run". The film aired on several local bay area television networks and later went on to win the Silver Award at the International Film & TV Festival of New York Film Festival in 1975. With 110,000 participants, the Bay to Breakers race held on May 18, 1986, was recognized by the Guinness Book of World Records as the world's largest footrace. That record number was partly the product of the running boom of the 1980s; currently the average participation is between 70,000 and 80,000. Many participants do not register; of the estimated 60,000 participants in 2008, 33,000 were registered. The San Francisco Examiner, a former sponsor of the race, published a list of the first 10,000 finishers the day after the race each year.

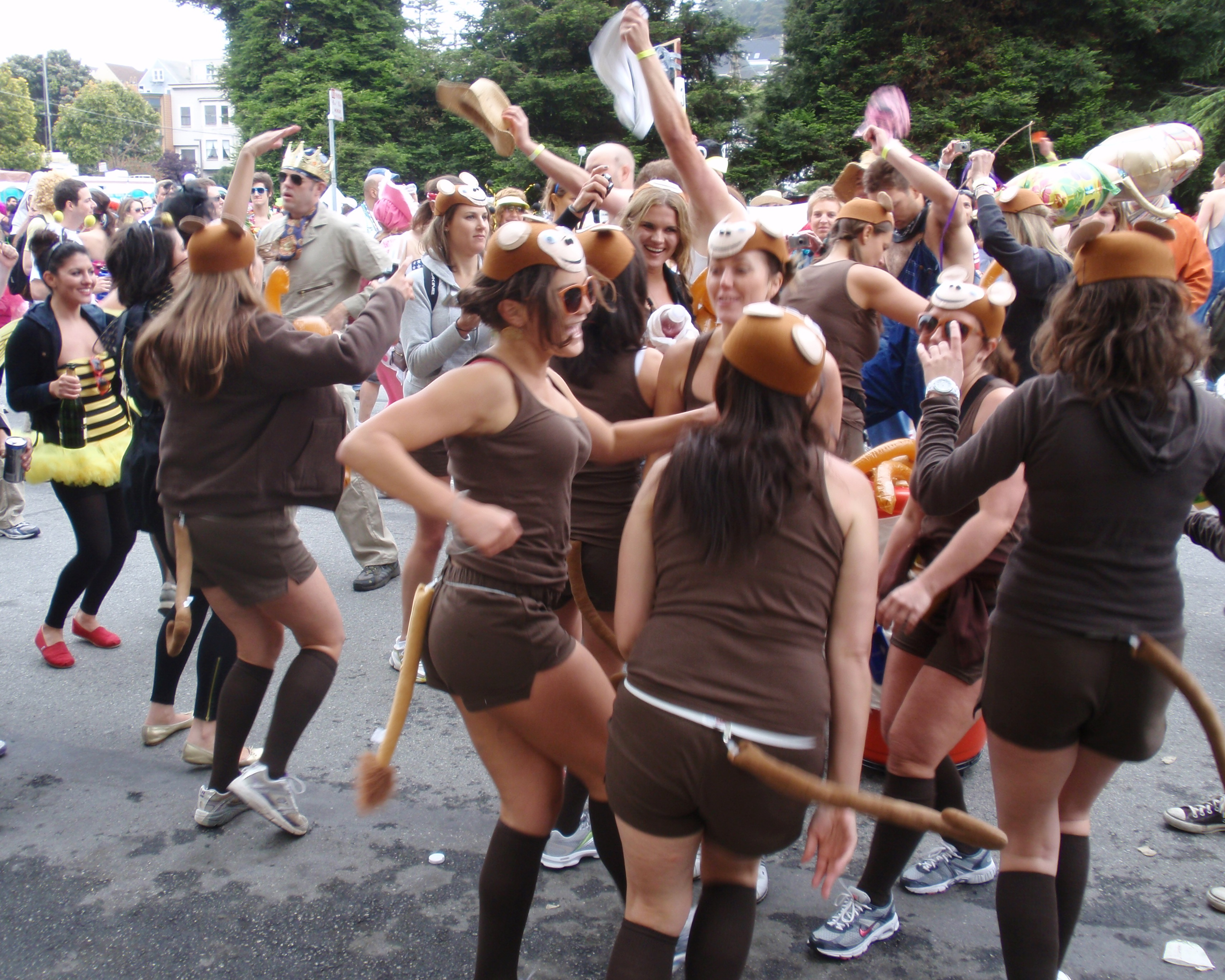
Participants enjoy a musical performance at Bay to Breakers in 2010.

The route is typically dotted with various local bands performing. At the end of the race is a Finish Line Festival, a gathering where participants and spectators can enjoy musical performances by various musical acts.

In February 2009, city officials and race sponsors announced changes to the race regulations. The regulations included an official ban on floats, alcohol, drunkenness and nudity. The changes were made to assuage the concerns of San Francisco residents along the parade route, who say the race has gotten out of hand in recent years. The news sparked outrage amongst many Bay Area residents who said the changes would destroy much that has made the race a national treasure for most of the last century.

2020 and 2021 saw a virtual race run for the first time as a live human race wasn't held. Officials cite the COVID-19 pandemic as grounds for moving the race to online. Entrants for the 2020 race were also given the option to defer their entry to 2021 or get refunded. The race returned as an in-person event on May 15, 2022.

As a race from city to beach, the race emulated the Dipsea Race, an annual race begun in 1905, which goes from downtown Mill Valley to Stinson Beach.

== Organization operators ==
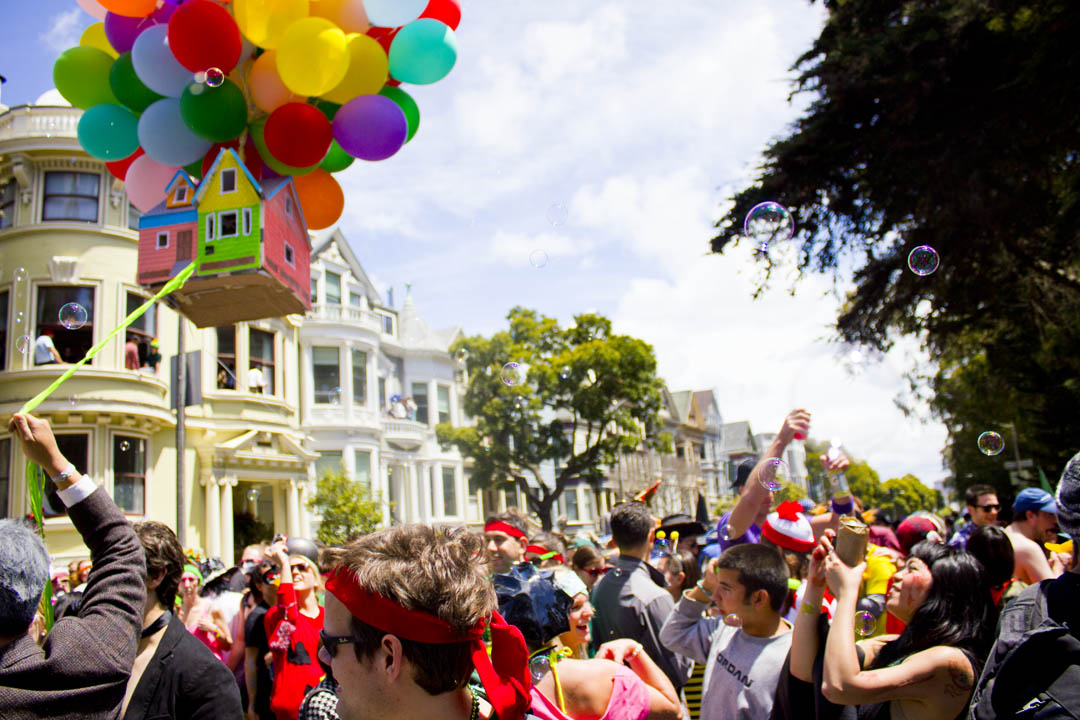
House parties are present along the course.

On February 19, 2004, the Fang family sold the San Francisco Examiner who owned and operated Bay to Breakers, to Philip Anschutz.

Since October 2013, Wasserman Media Group has owned and operated Bay to Breakers, who acquired it from Anschutz Entertainment Group, for an undisclosed sum.

== Sponsors ==
In 2010, ING completed 5 years of sponsorship. In 2011, online retailer Zazzle signed a deal to sponsor Bay to Breakers for 2 years. After Zazzle dropped out as a title sponsor in 2013, the race was picked up by Craigslist. In 2014, ZOZI, the B2B2C platform for the $125B global tours and activities market, signed a deal to sponsor Bay to Breakers.

On February 12, 2014, Bay to Breakers announced a partnership with athletic apparel company Under Armour to provide race participants with hi-tech runner's shirts. All registered participants receive perks like the Under Armour T, as well as an MVP membership to Map My Fitness, Finisher Medals, Race Bib with Timing Tag, on course entertainment and access to the Finish Line Festival. On February 18, 2015 Zappos.com became the multi-year title sponsor of the event. As such, the event was renamed "Zappos.com Bay to Breakers".

On March 30, 2017 Alaska Airlines became the title sponsor of the race in an effort to connect with the Bay Area community and events. Zappos.com resumed title sponsorship of the race in 2022.

== Course ==
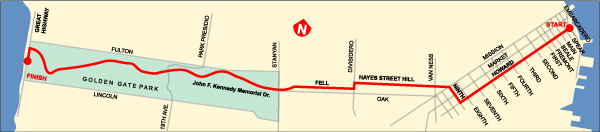
The Bay to Breakers course

The Bay to Breakers is held on a USA Track & Field certified point-to-point course. USATF notes that the course is "wind dependent", therefore, a USA Track & Field record can only be set when it can be shown that there is no significant tailwind.

The initial course started at the Ferry Building along Market Street to Golden Gate Avenue before turning onto Divisadero Street. In 1968, the start was moved from Market Street to Howard Street and the ascension to Divisadero moved to Hayes Street. In 1983, the course was shortened from 7.51 miles to an official 12 km (7.46 miles). The current course turns west along Hayes Street and up Hayes Street Hill near Alamo Square. This is the only major incline in the race. After the hill, the race runs along the panhandle and then west through Golden Gate Park, past the Conservatory of Flowers, all the way to the Great Highway and Ocean Beach. The Great Highway will also host a Finish Line Festival, a postrace recovery and reunion area.

== Participants ==
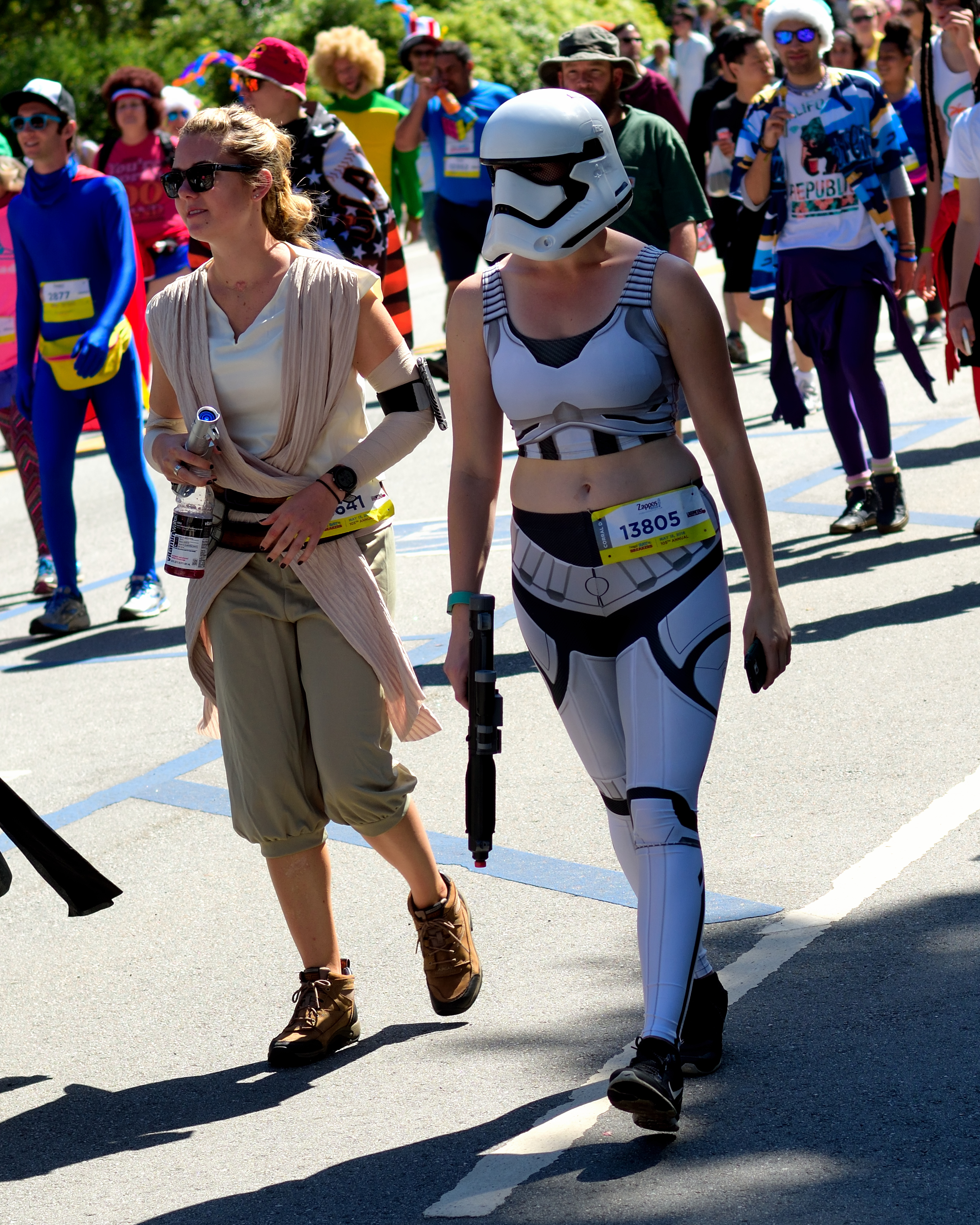
Costumes are commonly worn by race participants and party-goers.

Bay to Breakers is one of the most popular footraces in the United States. Large numbers of participants walk the route behind the runners, and many dress in costumes, while others wear nothing but shoes, thus lending a party atmosphere to the event. Participants have developed a number of unique, festive practices for the race. One festive tradition is the tortilla toss, during which crowds of runners waiting to cross the start line throw tortillas at one another to pass time (similar to balloon-batting at rock concerts).

Other oddities are always on the scene, including traditional characters such as Superman, Batman, Wonder Woman, and Spider-Man, as well as other unique characters spawned for the race. At least 40 pairs of Blues Brothers participated in the 1985 edition. Every year, some runners dressed as salmon run "upstream" from the breakers to the Bay.

=== Centipedes ===
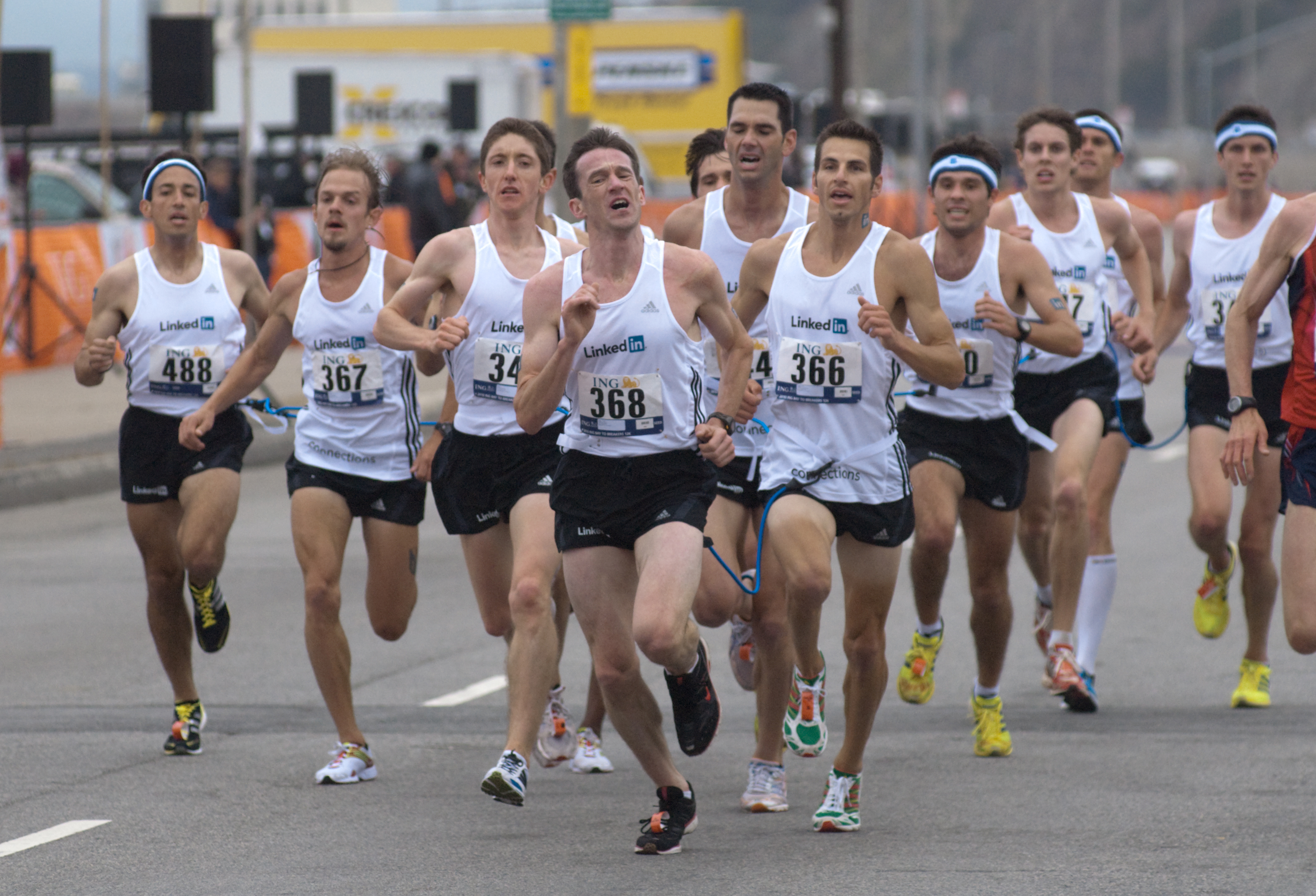
The LinkedIn team, which won the 2010 Centipede competitions

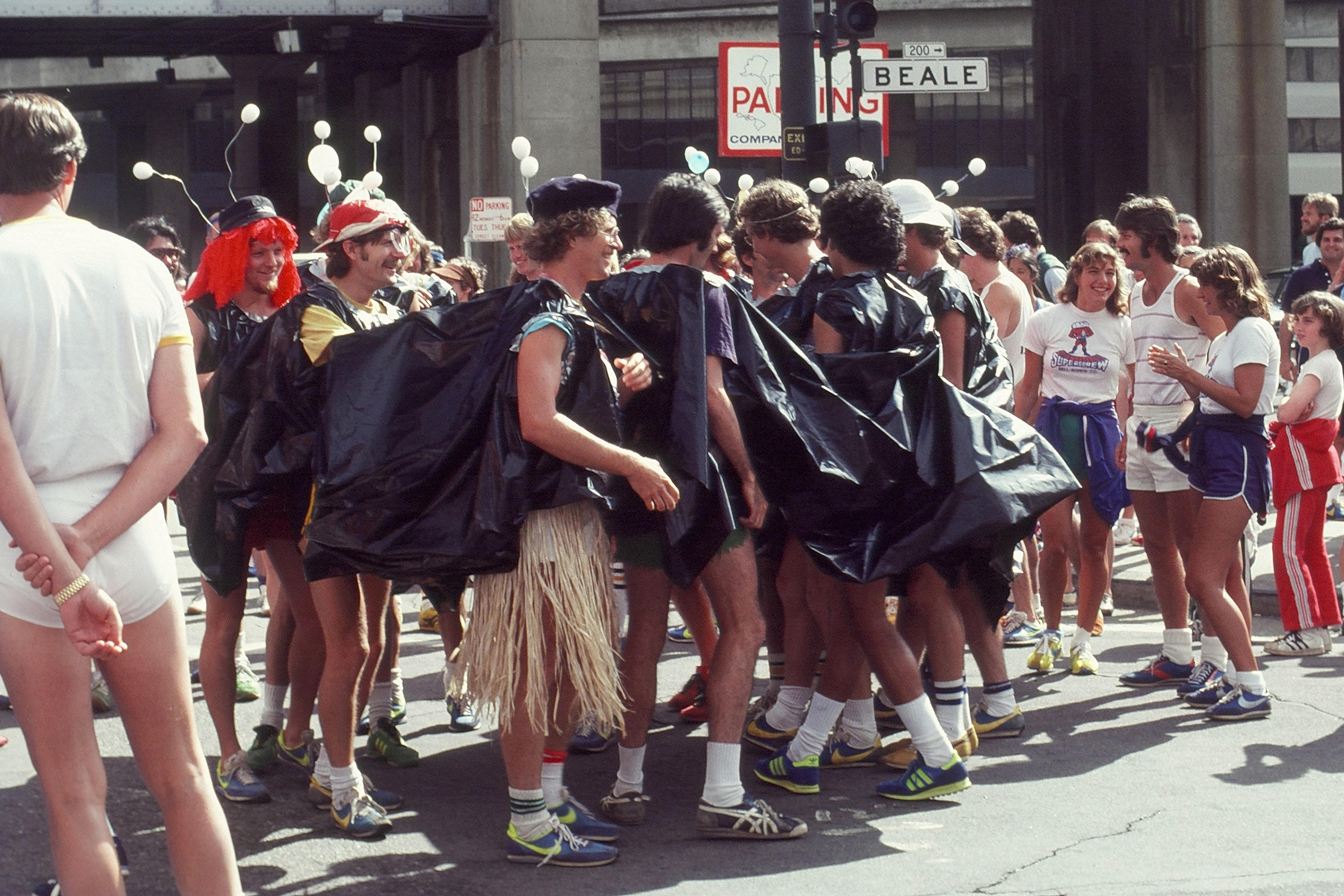
The first centipede in the world was started by the UC Davis Aggies in 1978. Originally connected with heavy plastic, Reebok later sponsored the team and the connective material was changed to a lighter fabric.

Bay to Breakers features a special team division called "centipedes". Teams of 13 or more runners will travel the full 12k course together linked by a bungee cord, or any other safe mechanism. An additional runner, a floater, usually the team captain, is allowed to run along untethered to pace the team or substitute for a drop out runner. Despite the novelty, the centipede race is very competitive. Bay to Breakers is the official site of the World Centipede Running Championships. Official scoring is determined by time and the completion of the entire course by the originally starting members with an exemption for the floater substitute. The Bay to Breakers provides special chip bibs for these teams.

While the founding of the "centipede" is commonly attributed to Dwayne "Peanut" Harms, who was an original member of the first-ever "Pede" and a member of the UC Davis men's track team, ("Aggies"), in 1978, Douglas L. Peck, also a UC Davis runner, founded a special division of the race in which 13 runners are connected as a unit. Peck also ran as "Head Pede," i.e., he was the leader of the centipede. The "original 'pede" has been running a team since the 70's with substituted runners.

=== Course records ===
Race organizers and media have reported that the course records set by Sammy Kitwara in 2009 and Lineth Chepkurui in 2010 are also world records at the 12 km distance; however, the International Association of Athletics Federations, the international governing body for the sport of athletics/track and field, does not recognize world records or world bests in either an indoor or outdoor 12 km. The Association of Road Racing Statisticians, a non-regulatory group that collects road running data, does recognize world records in the outdoor 12 km provided that the race course meets certain criteria. In order to rule-out the possibility of wind assistance in point-to-point courses, the ARRS stipulates that the course must have "not more than 30% of the race distance separation between that start and finish", or 3.6 km for a 12 km race. Given that the Bay to Breakers is run on a point-to-point course in which the start and finish of the event are approximately 10.5 linear kilometers apart, the ARRS recognizes two other marks as 12 km world records: Kenyan Simon Kigen's 33:46 in Portland, Oregon on May 19, 1985, and Chepkurui's 38:10 at the 2010 Lilac Bloomsday Run. (Note: Race records from the Association of Road Racing Statisticians indicate that Joseph Kimani of Kenya also ran a 33:31 at the Arts Fest River Run in Evansville, Indiana in 1997; however, it was also held on a point-to-point course that USATF has noted as "wind dependent" and not "record eligible".)

=== Individual winners ===
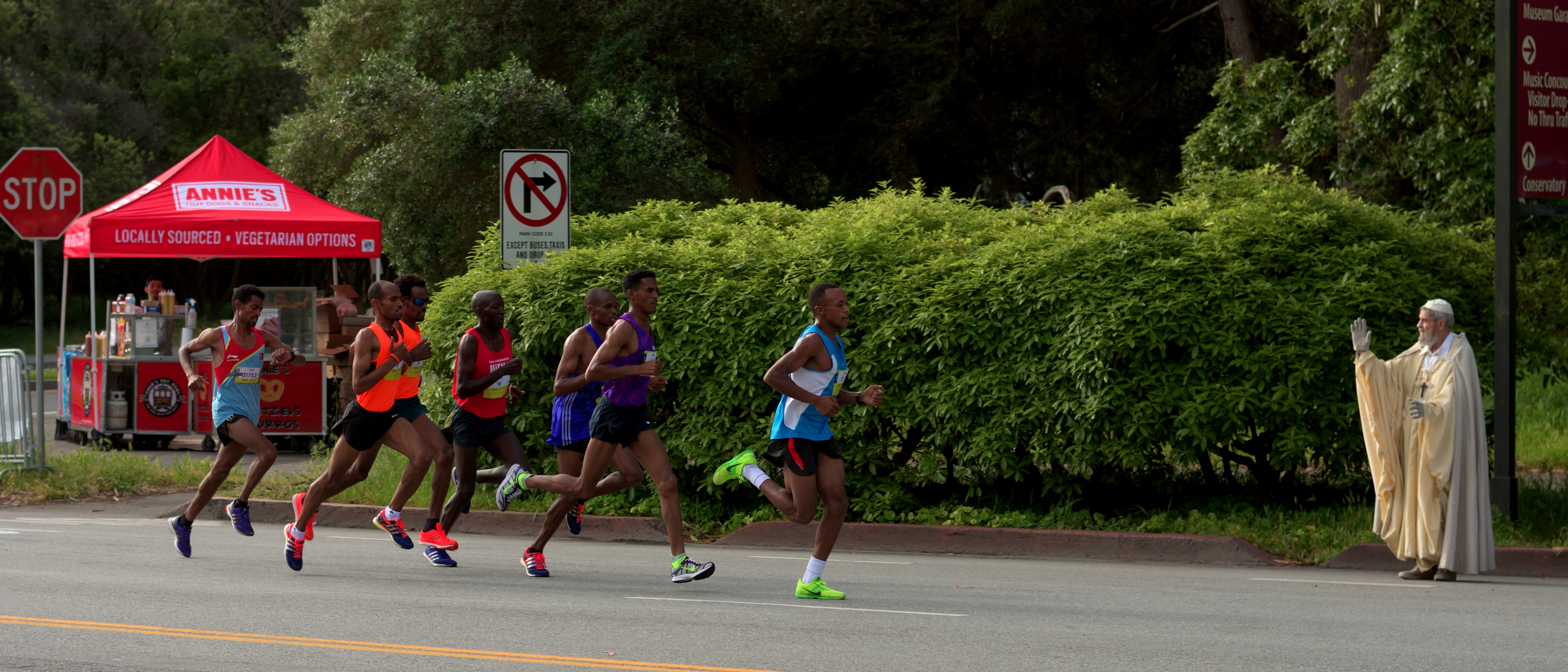
Bay to Breakers frontrunners in 2016

= Course record

Date	Men's Winner	Country	Time	Women's Winner	Country	Time
January 1, 1912	Bobby Vlught	United States	44:10			
January 1, 1913	Bobby Vlught	United States	40:59			
January 1, 1914	Oliver Millard	United States	40:46.6			
January 1, 1915	Oliver Millard	United States	41:39			
January 1, 1916	George Wyckoff	United States	42:33			
January 1, 1917	Oliver Millard	United States	41:29.6			
January 1, 1918	Edgar Stout	United States	42:41			
January 1, 1919	Harry Ludwig	United States	42:45.4			
January 1, 1920	William Churchill	United States	40:56.6			
January 1, 1921	Charles Hunter	United States	40:27.6			
January 1, 1922	William Churchill	United States	42:56			
January 1, 1923	William Churchill	United States	41:56			
January 1, 1924	William Churchill	United States	41:52			
January 1, 1925	Vincenzo Goso	United States	42:59.6			
January 1, 1926	Frank Eames	United States	42:13			
January 1, 1927	Frank Eames	United States	42:55.8			
January 29, 1928	Pietro Giordanengo	United States	43:05			
January 27, 1929	Pietro Giodanengo	United States	43:05			
February 2, 1930	Manuel John	United States	43:10			
February 1, 1931	Jack Keegan	United States	44:28			
February 7, 1932	Ray Cocking	United States	43:19			
February 5, 1933	Jack Keegan	United States	43:31			
January 28, 1934	John Nehi	United States	42:12			
March 3, 1935	Leo Karlhofer	United States	43:50.6			
March 1, 1936	Joe McCluskey	United States	40:37.2			
March 14, 1937	Norm Bright	United States	39:52			
March 6, 1938	Ed Preston	United States	41:15			
March 12, 1939	Ed Preston	United States	41:14			
March 10, 1940	Ed Preston	United States	42:12			
March 2, 1941	Frank Lawrence	United States	42:39			
March 15, 1942	James Haran	United States	43:53			
October 10, 1943	Joseph Wehrly	United States	45:01			
April 30, 1944	Fred Kline	United States	43:15			
May 6, 1945	Fred Kline	United States	43:25.1			
April 7, 1946	Fred Kline	United States	44:28			
March 23, 1947	Merle Knox	United States	43:52			
April 18, 1948	Fred Kline	United States	44:27			
May 1, 1949	Merle Knox	United States	42:58			
May 7, 1950	Elwyn Stribling	United States	42:57			
May 6, 1951	John Holden	United States	46:09			
May 4, 1952	Jim Shettler	United States	45:34			
May 3, 1953	Jesse Van Zant	United States	42:05			
May 9, 1954	Jesse Van Zant	United States	42:15			
April 24, 1955	Jesse Van Zant	United States	43:32			
April 29, 1956	Walt Berger	United States	44:56			
May 12, 1957	Jesse Van Zant	United States	44:02			
May 11, 1958	Wilford King	United States	41:17			
May 24, 1959	Wilford King	United States	41:30			
May 22, 1960	Don Kelley	United States	41:59.8			
May 21, 1961	Jack Marden	United States	41:30			
May 20, 1962	Jim Shettler	United States	41:25.3			
May 19, 1963	Herman Gene Gurule	United States	40:15.7			
May 17, 1964	Jeff Fishback	United States	38:32			
May 23, 1965	William Morgan	United States	38:02			
May 22, 1966	Eric Brenner	United States	41:10.6	Frances K. Conley	United States	1:00:07
May 21, 1967	Tom Laris	United States	38:42			
May 26, 1968	Kenny Moore	United States	38:15			
May 25, 1969	Kenny Moore	United States	38:40	Mary Etta Boitano	United States	1:01:12
May 24, 1970	Kenny Moore	United States	39:29	Joyce Swannack-Gibbs	United States	58:08
May 23, 1971	Kenny Moore	United States	36:57	Frances Conley (Note: According to race organizers, Frances Conley was the first official female runner in 1971.)	United States	50:45
May 21, 1972	Kenny Moore	United States	36:39	Cheryl Flanagan	United States	44:47
May 20, 1973	Kenny Moore	United States	37:15	Cheryl Flanagan	United States	45:20
May 19, 1974	Gary Tuttle	United States	37:07	Mary Etta Boitano	United States	43:22
May 18, 1975	Ric Rojas	United States	37:18	Mary Etta Boitano	United States	46:04
May 16, 1976	Chris Wardlaw	Australia	37:28	Mary Etta Boitano	United States	49:20
May 15, 1977	Paul Geis	United States	37:28	Judy Leydig	United States	47:28
May 14, 1978	Gerard Barrett	Australia	35:17.4	Joyce Swannack-Gibbs	United States	47:02
May 20, 1979	Bob Hodge	United States	36:50	Laurie Binder	United States	43:07
May 18, 1980	Craig Virgin	United States	35:11	Laurie Binder	United States	42:20
May 17, 1981	Craig Virgin	United States	35:07	Janice Oehm	United States	41:47
May 16, 1982	Rod Dixon	New Zealand	35:08	Laurie Binder	United States	42:28
May 15, 1983	Rod Dixon	New Zealand	35:01.3	Laurie Binder	United States	41:24.7
May 20, 1984	Ibrahim Hussein	Kenya	35:11	Nancy Ditz	United States	42:32
May 19, 1985	Ibrahim Hussein	Kenya	34:53	Joan Samuelson	United States	39:55
May 18, 1986	Ed Eyestone	United States	34:33	Grete Waitz	Norway	38:45
May 17, 1987	Arturo Barrios	Mexico	34:45	Rosa Mota	Portugal	39:16
May 15, 1988	Arturo Barrios	Mexico	34:58	Lisa Ondieki	Australia	39:17
May 21, 1989	Arturo Barrios	Mexico	34:40	Ingrid Kristiansen	Norway	39:14
May 20, 1990	Arturo Barrios	Mexico	34:42	Jill Boltz	England	39:19.5
May 19, 1991	Thomas Osano	Kenya	33:55	Susan Sirma	Kenya	38:27
May 17, 1992	Thomas Osano	Kenya	33:57	Lisa Ondieki	Australia	38:36
May 16, 1993	Ismael Kirui	Kenya	33:42	Lynn Jennings	United States	39:14
May 15, 1994	Ismael Kirui	Kenya	34:03	Tegla Loroupe	Kenya	39:10
May 21, 1995	Ismael Kirui	Kenya	33:58	Delilah Asiago	Kenya	38:23
May 19, 1996	Thomas Osano	Kenya	34:35	Elana Meyer	South Africa	38:56
May 18, 1997	Joseph Kimani	Kenya	33:51	Jane Omoro	Kenya	39:56
May 17, 1998	Simon Rono	Kenya	33:58	Jane Omoro	Kenya	38:57
May 16, 1999	Lazarus Nyakeraka	Kenya	34:11	Catherine Ndereba	Kenya	38:37
May 21, 2000	Reuben Cheruiyot	Kenya	34:54	Colleen De Reuck	South Africa	38:42
May 20, 2001	James Koskei	Kenya	34:19	Jane Ngotho	Kenya	40:35
May 19, 2002	James Koskei	Kenya	34:03	Luminiţa Talpoş	Romania	39:15
May 18, 2003	James Koskei	Kenya	35:11	Lyudmila Biktasheva	Russia	39:22
May 16, 2004	Benjamin Maiyo	Kenya	34:50	Albina Ivanova	Russia	39:56
May 15, 2005	Gilbert Okari	Kenya	34:20	Asmae Leghzaoui	Morocco	38:22
May 21, 2006	Gilbert Okari	Kenya	34:20	Tatyana Hladyr	Ukraine	39:09
May 20, 2007	John Korir	Kenya	34:44	Edna Kiplagat	Kenya	38:55
May 18, 2008	John Korir	Kenya	34:24	Lineth Chepkurui	Kenya	39:22
May 17, 2009	Sammy Kitwara	Kenya	33:31	Teyba Erkesso	Ethiopia	38:29
May 16, 2010	Sammy Kitwara	Kenya	34:15	Lineth Chepkurui	Kenya	38:07
May 15, 2011	Ridouane Harroufi	Morocco	34:26	Lineth Chepkurui	Kenya	39:12
May 20, 2012	Sammy Kitwara	Kenya	34:41	Mamitu Daska	Ethiopia	39:03
May 19, 2013	Tolossa Gedefa	Ethiopia	35:01	Diane Nukuri-Johnson	Burundi	40:12
May 18, 2014	Geoffrey Kenisi	Kenya	35:06	Diane Nukuri-Johnson	Burundi	40:15
May 17, 2015	Isaac Mukundi Mwangi	Kenya	35:25	Jane Kibii	Kenya	40:04
May 15, 2016	Isaac Mukundi Mwangi	Kenya	35:23	Caroline Chepkoech	Kenya	40:36
May 21, 2017	Philemon Cheboi	Kenya	34:48	Buze Diriba	Ethiopia	39:48
May 20, 2018	Philemon Cheboi	Kenya	35:41	Jane Kibii	Kenya	40:27
May 19, 2019	Gabriel Geay	Tanzania	35:01	Caroline Rotich	Kenya	39:28
2020	2020 Bay to Breakers cancelled due to COVID-19					
2021	2021 Bay to Breakers cancelled due to COVID-19					
May 15, 2022	Reid Buchanan	United States	36:09	Julia Vasquez	United States	42:03
May 21, 2023	Colin Bennie	United States	35:48	Sarah Anderson	United States	43:02
May 19, 2024	Colin Bennie	United States	37:02	Julia Vasquez Giguere	United States	43:49
May 18, 2025	Oscar Medina	United States	37:08	Julia Vasquez Giguere	United States	42:27

=== Centipede winners ===
= Course record

Date	Men's Centipede Winner	Country	Time	Women's Centipede Winner	Country	Time
May 20, 1990	Reebok Aggies	USA	37:39	Reebok Aggies	USA	47:36
May 18, 2008	ASICS Aggies Men	USA	38:05	ASICS Aggies Women	USA	47:47
May 17, 2009	ASICS Aggies Men	USA	40:27	ASICS Aggies Women	USA	50:51
May 16, 2010	LinkedIn Centipede	USA	37:58	ASICS Aggies Women	USA	48:44
May 15, 2011	LinkedIn Centipede	USA	37:00	ASICS Aggies Women	USA	49:06
May 20, 2012	Team LinkedIn	USA	36:44	Impala Racing Team	USA	46:37
May 19, 2013	ASICS Aggies Centipede Men	USA	40:03	ASICS Aggies Centipede Women	USA	48:17
May 18, 2014	ASICS Aggies Centipede Men	USA	40:19	ASICS Aggies Centipede Women	USA	47:59
May 21, 2017	HOKA Aggies Running Club Men's Centipede	USA	39:49	Impala Racing Team	USA	49:48
May 20, 2018	HOKA Aggies Running Club Men's Centipede	USA	40:17	HOKA Aggies Running Club Women's Centipede	USA	48:54
May 19, 2019	HOKA Aggie Men Running Club	USA	39:58	HOKA Aggie Women Running Club	USA	45:48
2020	2020 Bay to Breakers cancelled due to COVID-19					
2021	2021 Bay to Breakers cancelled due to COVID-19					
May 15, 2022	PENINSULA DISTANCE CLUB	USA	39:11	IMPALA ONE	USA	51:09
May 21, 2023	HOKA Aggies Running Club	USA	38:55	PENINSULA DISTANCE CLUB	USA	46:42
May 19, 2024	HOKA Aggies Running Club	USA	40:00	PENINSULA DISTANCE CLUB	USA	46:31
May 18, 2025	HOKA Aggies Running Club	USA	40:42	Strapped & Stunning	USA	48:36

== Controversy ==
In 2025, Bay to Breakers ran out of medals. The organizers noted on their Facebook page that if someone crossed the finish line after 11:40 a.m. their medal would be mailed to them. David Perry, a spokesman for Bay to Breakers, told SFGATE that the medal shortage was due to unofficial participants.

== See also ==
- List of annual foot races in California
