= Bellin Run =

Annual 10K race held in Green Bay, Wisconsin

Coordinates: 44.502326°N 88.0114°W

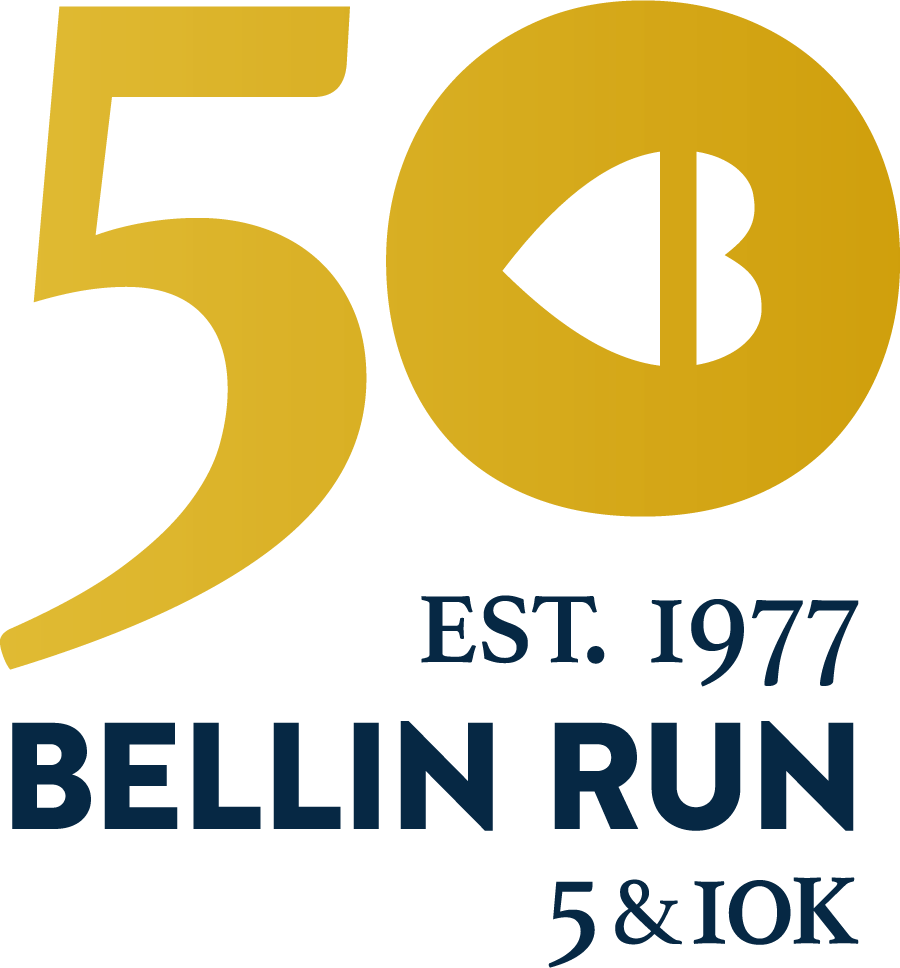
- Bellin Run 50th logo

Race Details
- Location: Green Bay, WI; First Run: June 12, 1977; Distance: 10 kilometers (6.2 mi); 5 kilometers (3.1 mi); Peak registration: 20,000 (2013); Total participants: 345,000+ (as of 2026); Official Website: www.bellinrun.com Organizer: Emplify Health by Bellin

The Bellin Run is an annual road race held in Green Bay, Wisconsin, on the second Saturday of June with the focus on putting "feet on the street in the name of health and wellness." The event includes 10-kilometer (6.2 mile) and 5-kilometer (3.1 mile) run/walk distances. It is organized by Emplify Health by Bellin (formerly Bellin Health), which sponsors the event near its main hospital campus. Since its founding in 1977, the event has grown into a beloved and iconic road race for the Midwest.

Each year, the Bellin Run releases a custom logo to commemorate that race.

== History ==
The first Bellin Run was held on June 12, 1977, under the name Bellin Heartwarming Run. It was organized as a one-time 10K event to mark the opening of the cardiac wing at Bellin Hospital and to promote cardiovascular fitness among area residents. The inaugural race drew 881 participants.

Following the first race, participants expressed interest in a subsequent edition, and the event became an annual tradition. Participation grew steadily over the following five decades, peaking at 20,000 runners and walkers in 2013. As of 2026, the event has recorded more than 345,000 cumulative finishers since its inception.

With increased participation and interest in a shorter distance option, organizers added the 5K option in 2023.

The Bellin Run introduced computerized chip timing in [year]. The event also implemented corral starts and preferred starting positions for faster runners.

== Bellin Run Legends ==
As of 2026, 20 individuals have completed every edition of the Bellin Run since the inaugural race in 1977. These participants are recognized by race organizers with the designation Bellin Run Legends.

== Course ==
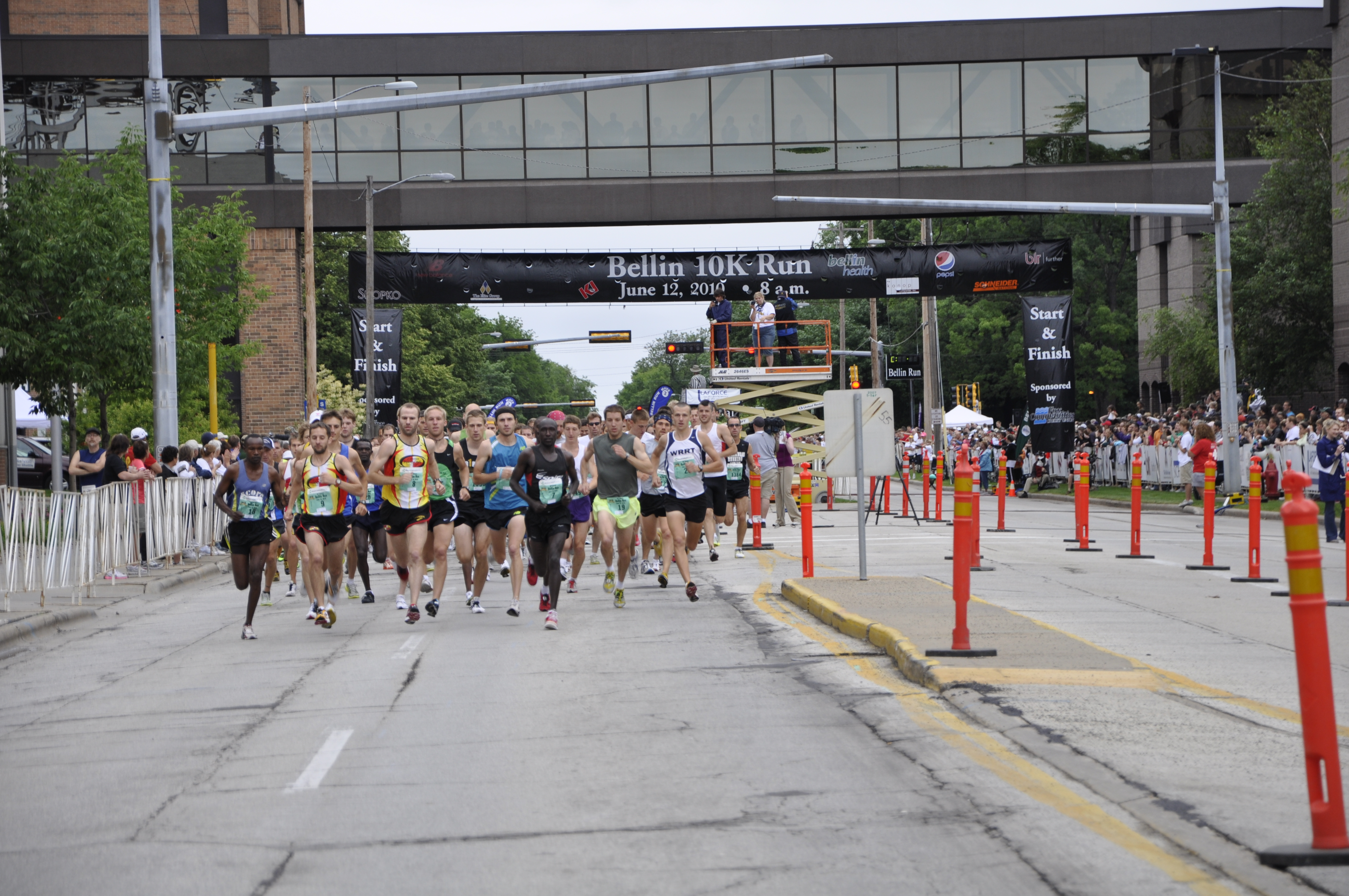

The Bellin Run 10K and 5K courses are United States Track and Field certified.

Both courses begin and finish near Emplify Health by Bellin Green Bay Hospital on the east side of Green bay, passing through the neighboring village of Allouez. The course is largely flat, with some gradual uphill stretches and a significant downhill on the 10K course. Water stations and medical personnel are scattered throughout both courses to keep participants hydrated and safe.

The course also includes live entertainment from DJs and local bands, as well as cheering squads made up of numerous community members and businesses.

Race-day road closures are coordinated among the city of Green Bay, the village of Allouez and the Brown County Sheriff's Department.

== Bellin Run Health & Fitness Expo ==
In 1991, a noncompetitive children's run was added. In 1995 that run was dedicated to the memory of Dick Lytie, an avid Green Bay-area runner and Bellin Run supporter who died in the summer of 1994. Due to its popularity and size, the run now takes place on the Friday evening before the Bellin Run. It features a half mile course for kids age 10 and under. In 2011, registration for the Children's Run was more than 3,000 participants making it a large part of the Bellin Run experience. Schneider National Trucking company is the major sponsor behind the Children's Run.

=== Health and Fitness Expo ===
On the Friday evening before the Bellin Run, Astor Park plays host to a health and fitness expo coordinated by Bellin Health. The expo features, an all-you-can-eat spaghetti dinner, booths with health-themed vendors, and a number of activities for children. The Friday activities include a large playground for children, inflatable toys, live entertainment, and a meet-and-greet autograph session with the elite athletes.

== Race registration information ==
Registration for the Bellin Run historically had been via conventional mail or drop-off. In 2006, Bellin Run organizers offered for the first time an online registration option. A price discount is currently offered to those who register online. In addition, organizers encourage online registration because it is more convenient for registration officials and it aligns with the race's go green initiatives. Online registration for the 2017 Bellin Run will close June 8. The price points are as follows:

Online Registration Period	10k Race	Children's Run	Kids for Running
Dec 20, 2016 – May 1, 2017	$25	$12	$15
May 2, 2017 - June 1, 2017	$30	$12	$15
June 2, 2017 - June 9, 2017	$35	$12	$15

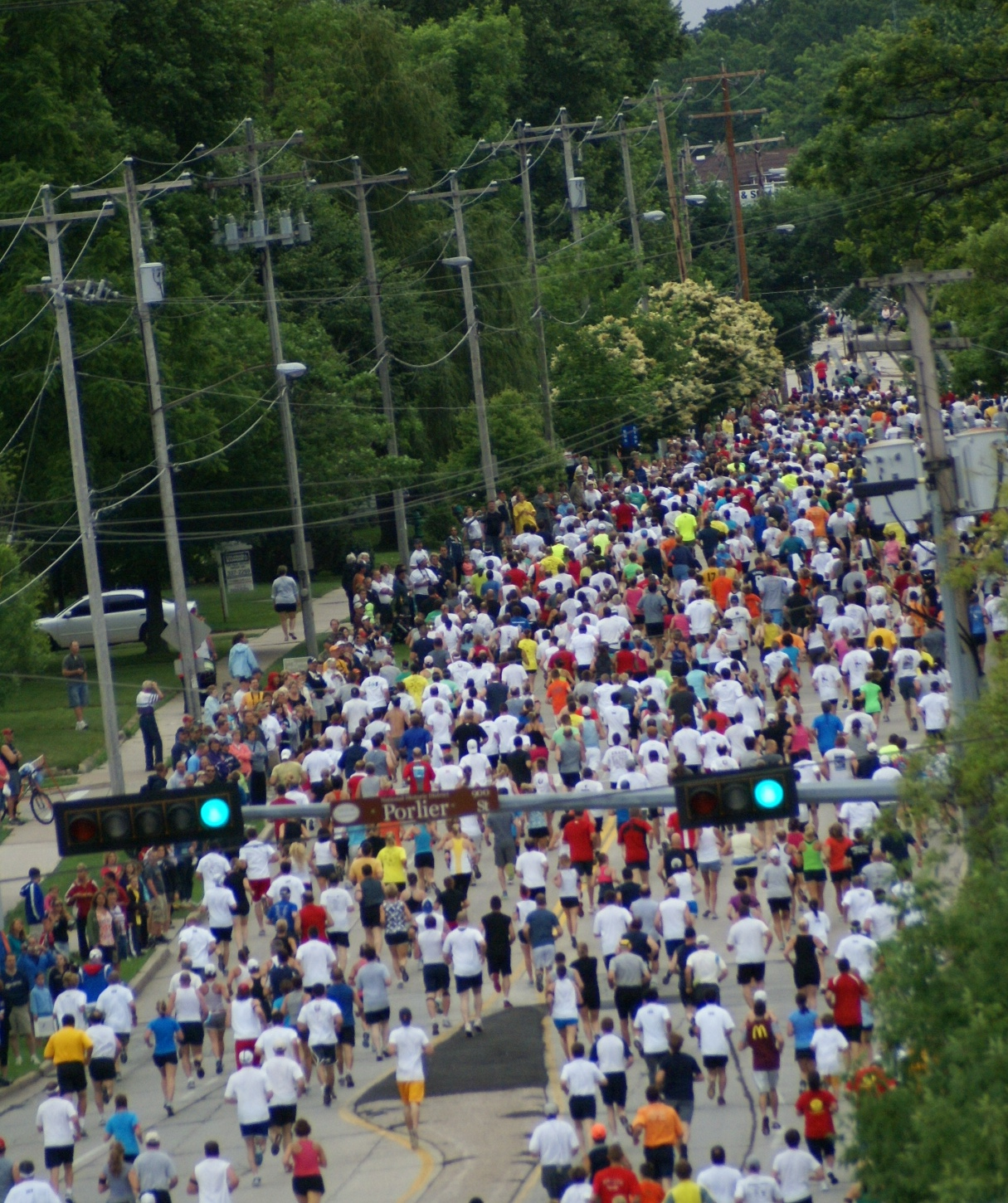

=== Free training program ===
Bellin Health provides free training sessions during a 12-week program called "Run a Better Bellin." The program gives runners and walkers a community setting to train for the 10K race. The program is open to walkers and runners of all experience levels.

== Charity ==
=== Nursing scholarship ===
Each year, a portion of the proceeds from the Bellin Run are used to support the Bellin College scholarship fund. The fund aids qualified nursing students. Since 1991 Bellin has contributed a portion of the Bellin Run proceeds to the scholarship fund, and as of 2011 more than $160,000 had been raised.

=== Volunteers ===
The Bellin Run relies heavily on the participation of volunteers. Nearly 1,000 volunteers assist with the run each year. Volunteers fill a number of needs on and around the race course and its related events. Volunteers participate in activities ranging from water distribution and traffic regulation to assistance with the Friday night events and race registration. All volunteers receive a commemorative Bellin Run T-shirt.

== Special participation ==
=== Corporate challenge ===
The Bellin Run Corporate Challenge is a competition held among regional businesses in conjunction with the annual Bellin Run. Participating companies compete based on combined finishing times and total employee participation rates. Organizers establish the program as an initiative to promote physical fitness and health within the local business community and to increase camaraderie through friendly competition.

Some of the benefits of being a Corporate Challenge participant include: A team photograph, discounted rates for the spaghetti dinner, and a company tent for employees the morning of the race. Companies also compete in a T-shirt challenge to see which business designs the most creative T-shirt. Winners receive a small prize. Nearly 250 companies participated in 2011.

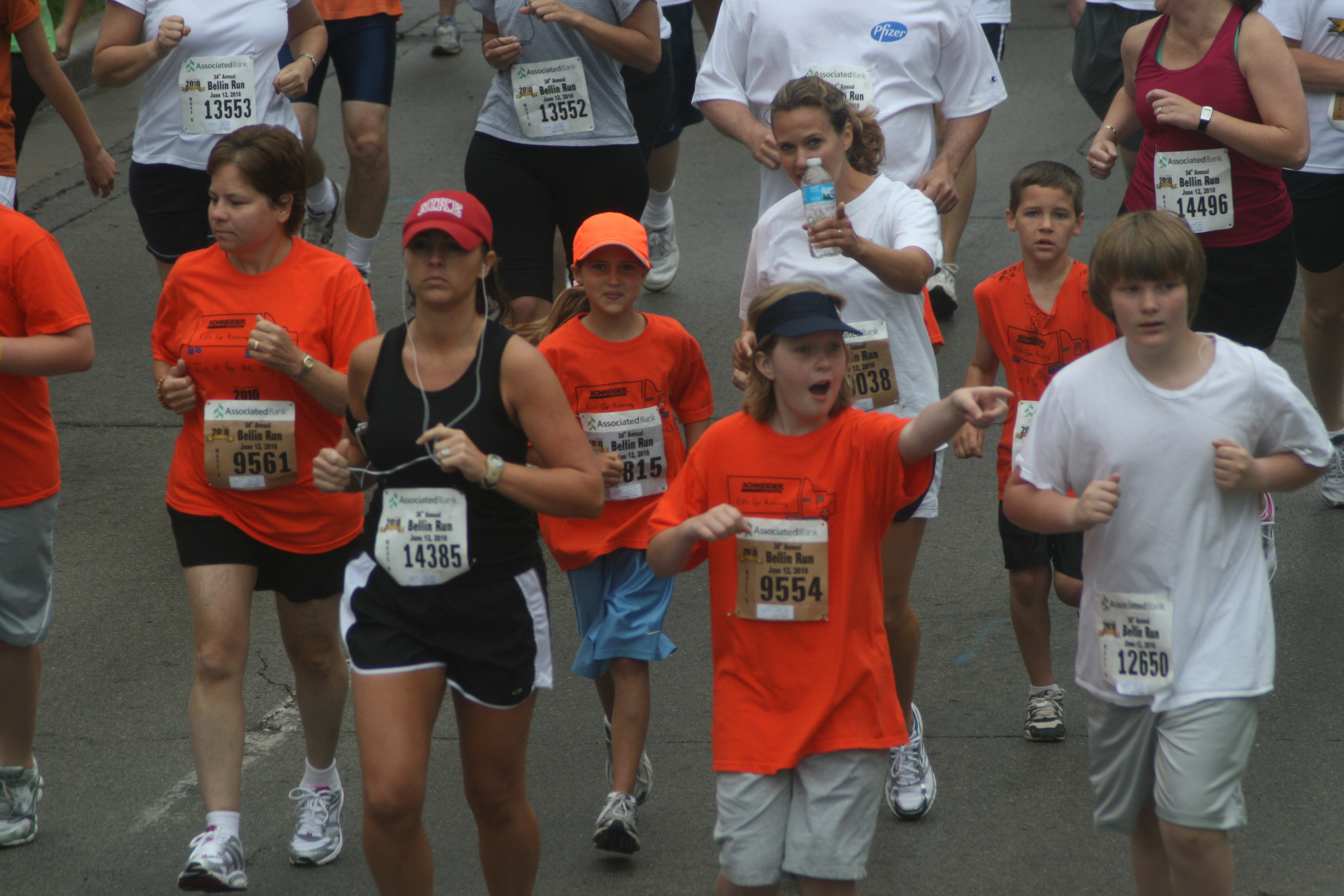

=== Kids for Running ===
Kids for Running is a training program designed to get kids in third through eighth grades active and health-conscious in their formative years. Several thousand kids from schools across Wisconsin and Michigan's Upper Peninsula participate in the program each year culminating in their participation in the 10K race. The program is fully integrated in participating schools' physical education programs.

The Kids for Running program encourages Bellin's theme of encouraging communitywide health and fitness. Research suggests that learning healthy habits at a younger age will likely lead to healthier lifestyle choices in the future.

The program, much like the Bellin Run Corporate Challenge, offers a T-shirt contest. An award is given to the student whose design for their school is deemed the best.

=== High School Challenge ===
Under this program, students and staff from area high schools compete with other schools to determine who can earn the highest participation rate in the Bellin Run (based on the percentage of the total number of students, staff and faculty). The winning school receives an award for display.

Another vehicle through which high schoolers are encouraged to participate in the Bellin Run is through the Running Buddies program. This program offers the opportunity for high schoolers to mentor younger students enrolled in the Bellin Run Kids for Running program. These young mentors earn community service hours for their participation, and a discounted Bellin Run registration fee.

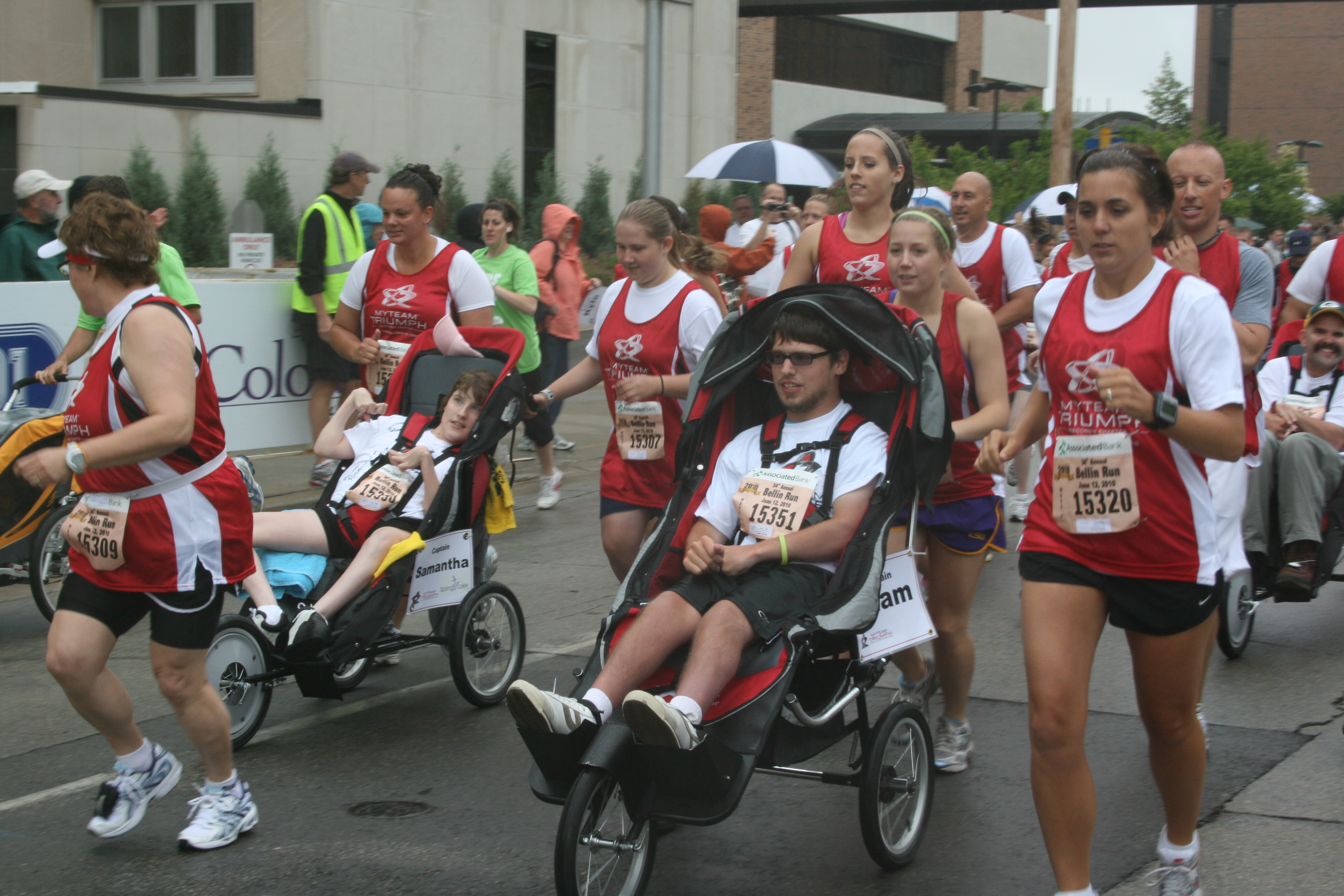

=== Back to the Road Crew ===
Individuals who have faced recovery and rehabilitation from surgery or a major illness are invited to participate in a shortened version of the Bellin Run. This shortened course is offered through Bellin Health's "Back to the Road" program. The program helps get orthopedic, cardiac rehab and general rehab patients active again after medical treatment. It is an invitation-only event. Participants walk or run a 1-mile route of the Bellin Run, however, some complete the entire 10K route.

=== My Team Triumph ===
My Team Triumph is a ride-along program for kids and adults who have disabilities that severely limit them from participating in road races and other similar events. The disabled participants, also known as "captains," are pushed or pulled along the course in modified carriages by their "angels" or volunteers who help to chauffeur the carriages to the finish.

== Recent changes ==
=== Corral system starts ===
The Bellin Run 10K currently offers seven corrals to begin the race. There are five corrals of runners followed by a stroller division in the sixth wave. Walkers occupy the seventh wave. Stroller participants in 2009 started at the same time as walkers. The corral system was added for the 2011 race as the result of feedback from participants in 2010 Bellin Run. The change was an effort to address future growth, according to Bellin Run organizers. The corral system start was first employed by the Bellin Run in 2011 after seven consecutive years of record-breaking attendance. Corral system starts feature a continuous line of participants seeded by their anticipated pace. The line moves forward until all runners and walkers cross the start line.

=== Astor Park ===
Astor Park is home to pre-race activities and locations such as the Friday Night Children's Run, the spaghetti dinner, the registration tent, elite athlete autograph session, and entertainment. On race day is the landing zone for all post-race events including the awards ceremony, refreshments, post-race results, musical entertainment and more.

The transition to Astor Park was made starting in 2008 once it was determined that it offered much more space for the continually growing race event than the previously used Baird Park.

=== Chip timing ===
Electronic timing chips have been used in the Bellin Run since 2000. The timing chips record when each runner passes the start line and when they cross the finish. The timing chips are typically fastened to a runner's shoe and depending on the type of timing chip, can be recycled after use. The Bellin Run has mostly employed the use of recyclable timing chips. Chip timing has led to more accurate electronic results.

=== Parking and shuttles ===
Parking for the Bellin Run is available in identified lots and on city streets near Bellin Memorial Hospital. However, to help ease the congestion, there is a free shuttle service offered from off-site lots. Participants and spectators may park and be shuttled in from one of two locations: the East Town Mall former Shopko retail store (in east Green Bay), or the Bay Park Square Mall former Shopko location (near the west side of Green Bay). Shuttles pick up participants at both locations every 15 minutes from 6:30 to 7:30 a.m. and drop them off at Astor Park. Return shuttles run from 9 a.m. to noon.

== Interesting fact sheet ==
=== Elite athletes ===
World-class runners have always been a part of the Bellin Run. This started with Frank Shorter in 1977 and has included others such as Bill Rodgers, Rosa Mota, Joan Samuelson, Simeon Kigen, Lisa Weidenbach, Bruce Bickford, Ed Eyestone, John Campbell, Dan Held, Suzy Favor-Hamilton, Bob Kempainen, Elva Dryer, Elana Meyer, Joeseph Kimani, Uta Pippig, Tegla Loroupe, Khalid Khannouchi, Jean Driscoll, and John Kipsang Korir.

The field of world-class runners has included former and current Olympians, national marathon champions, international elites, a number of 10K record holders and many other accomplished participants.

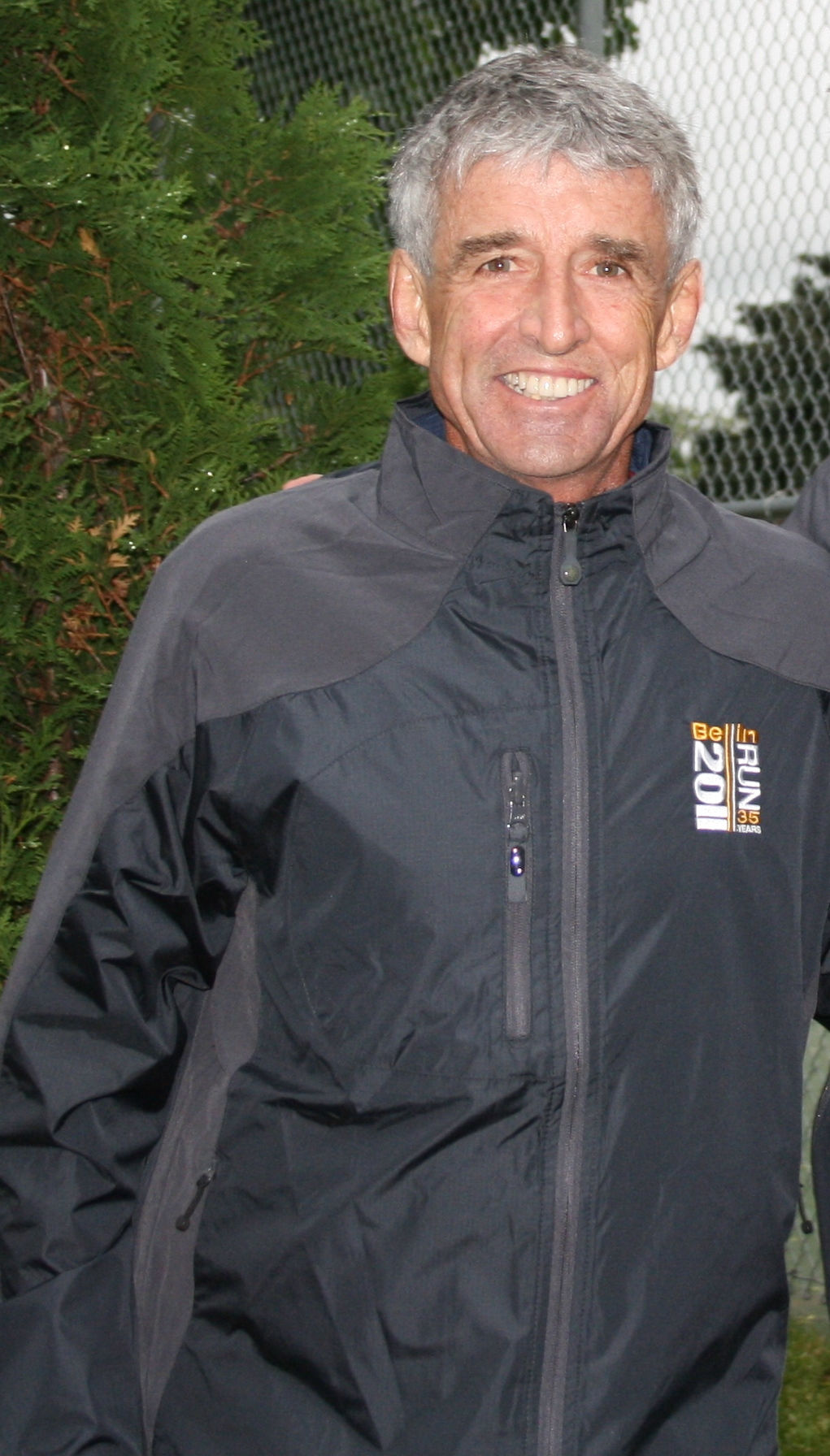
Frank Shorter

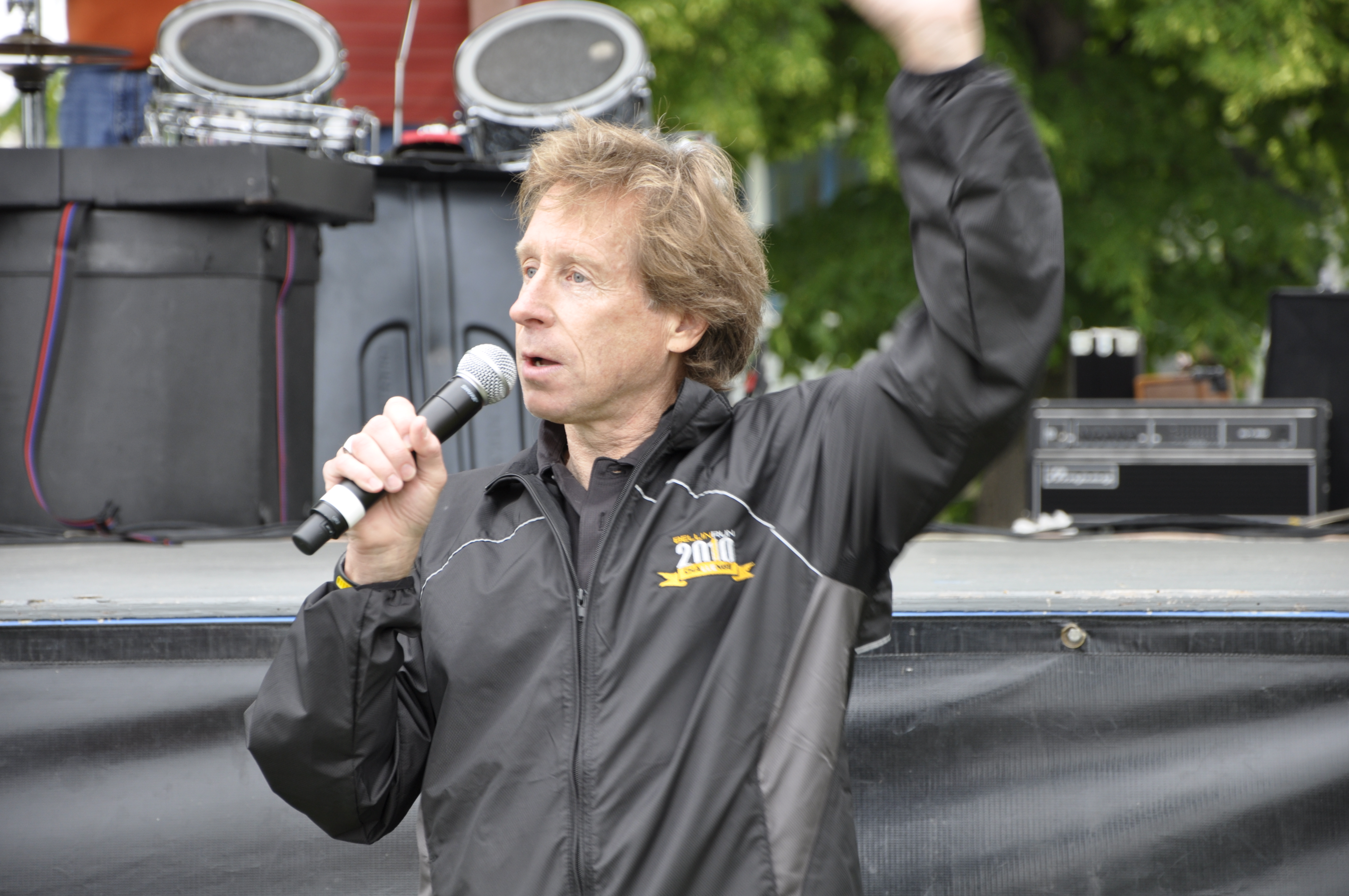
Bill Rodgers

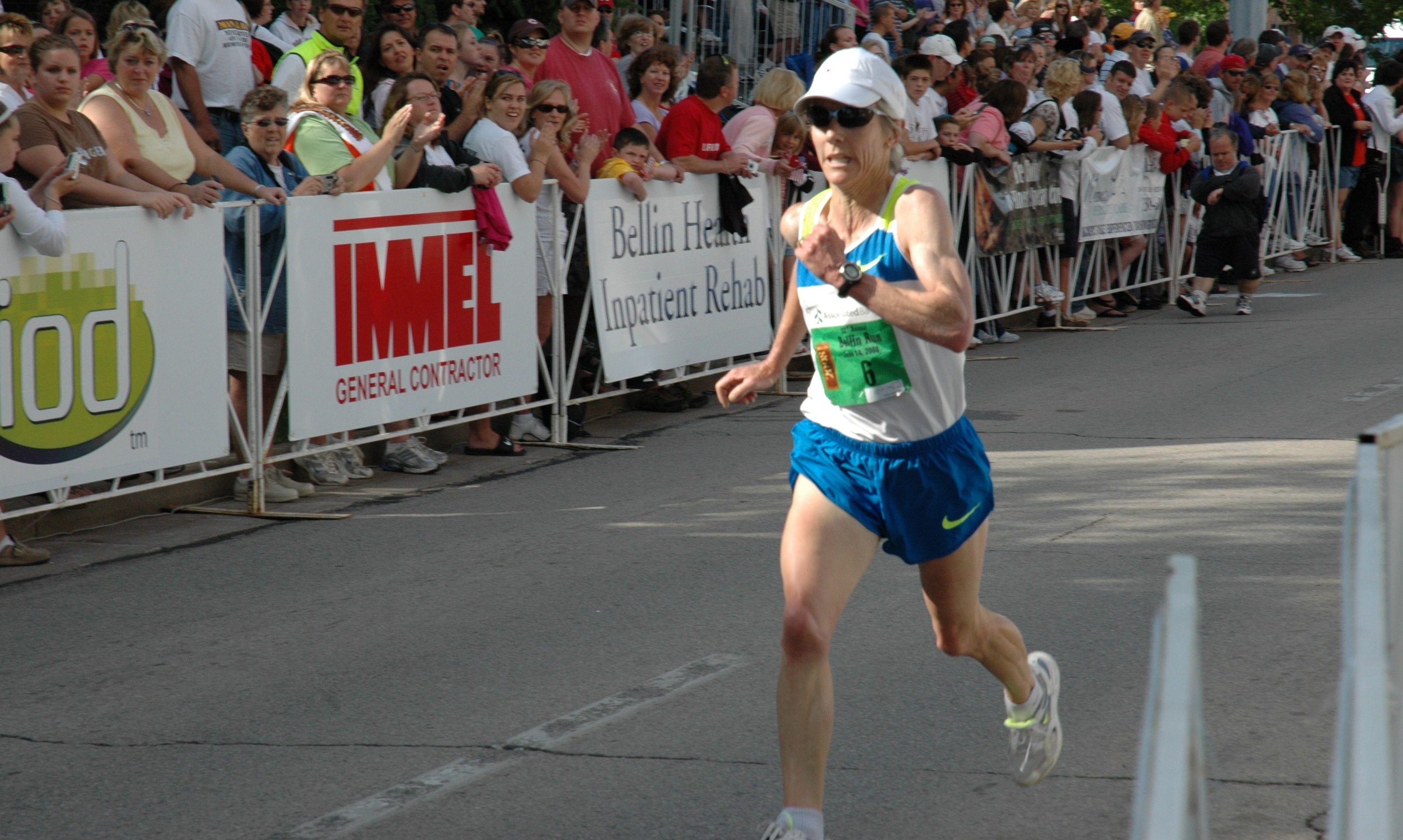
Joan Samuelson

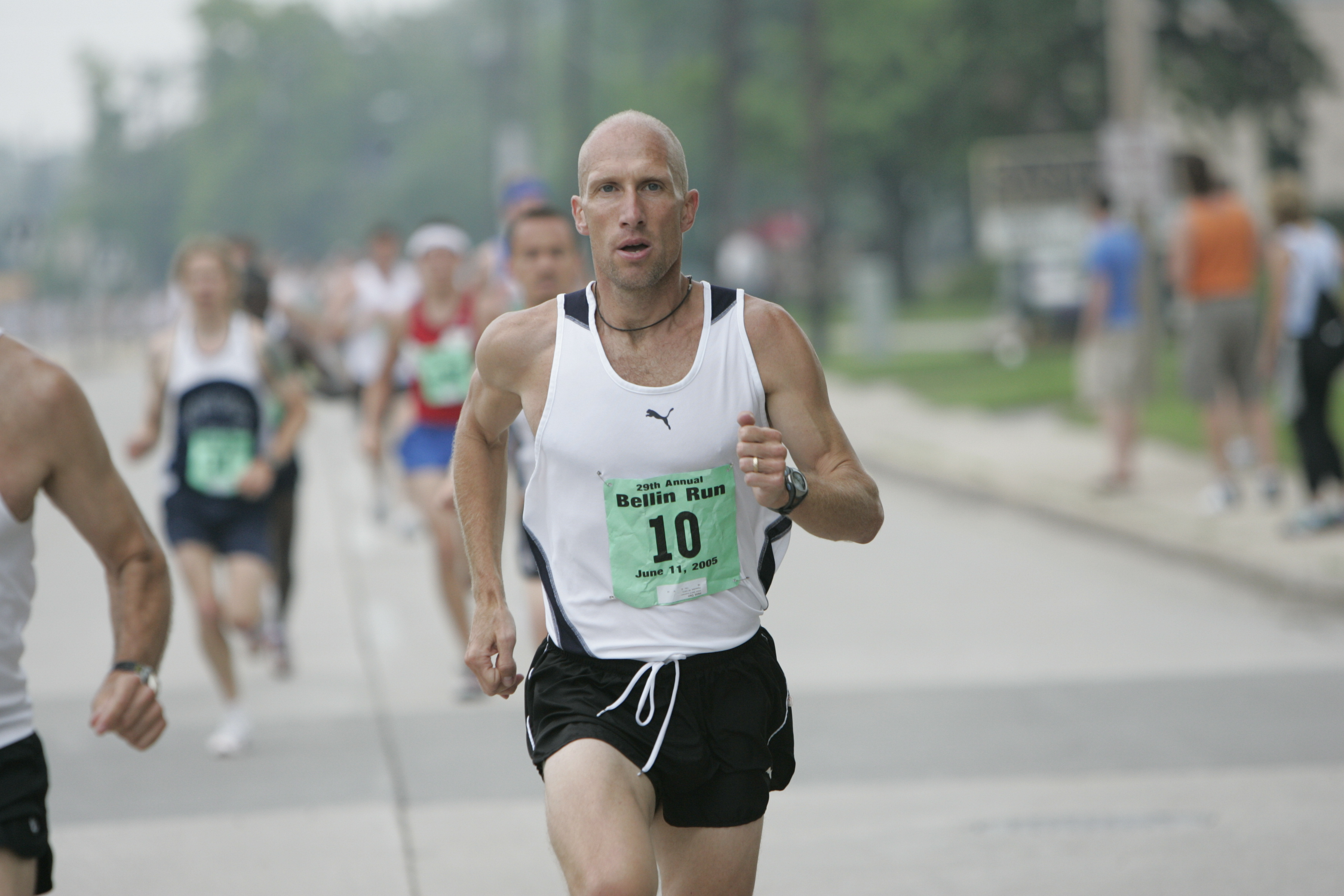
Dan Held

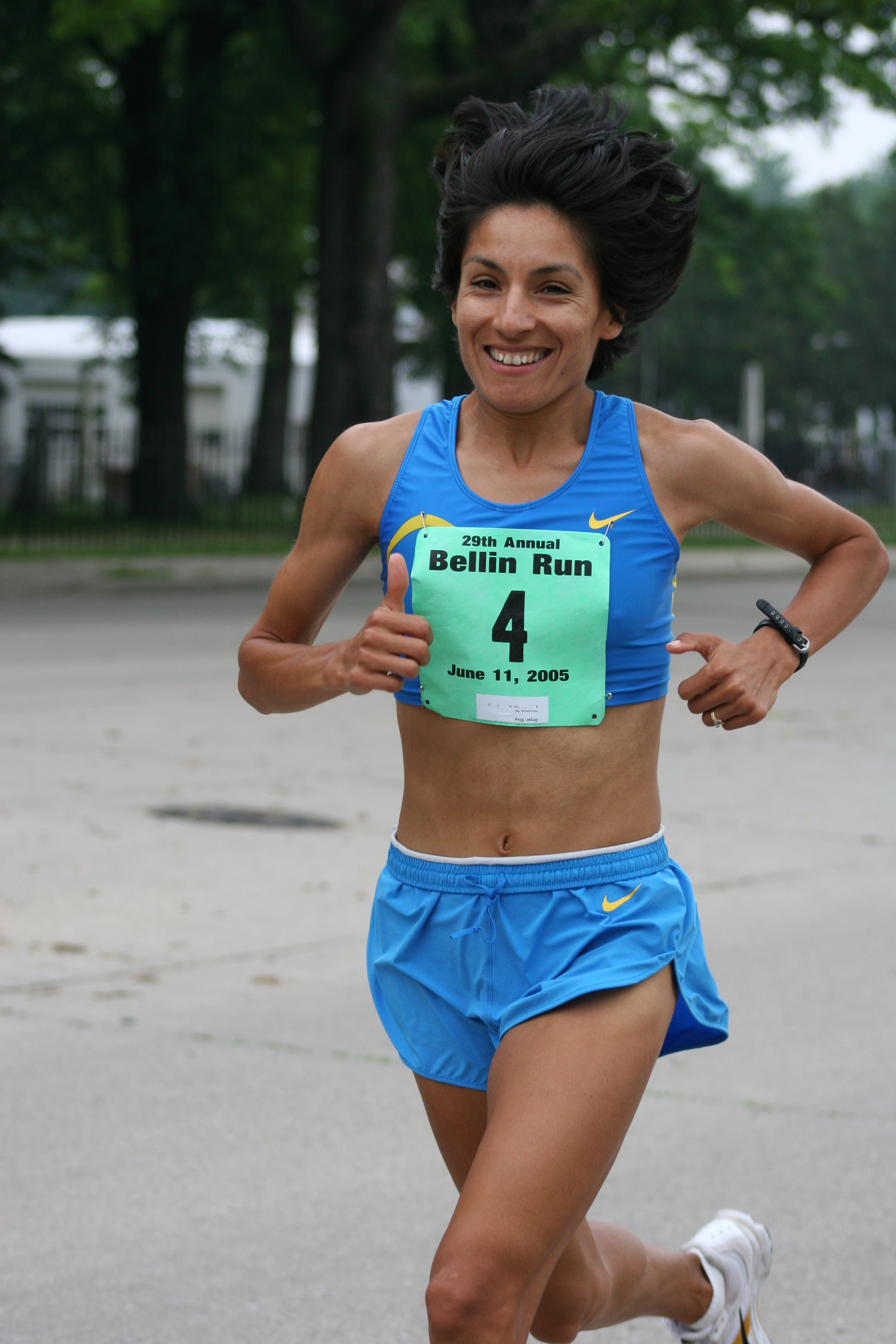
Elva Dryer

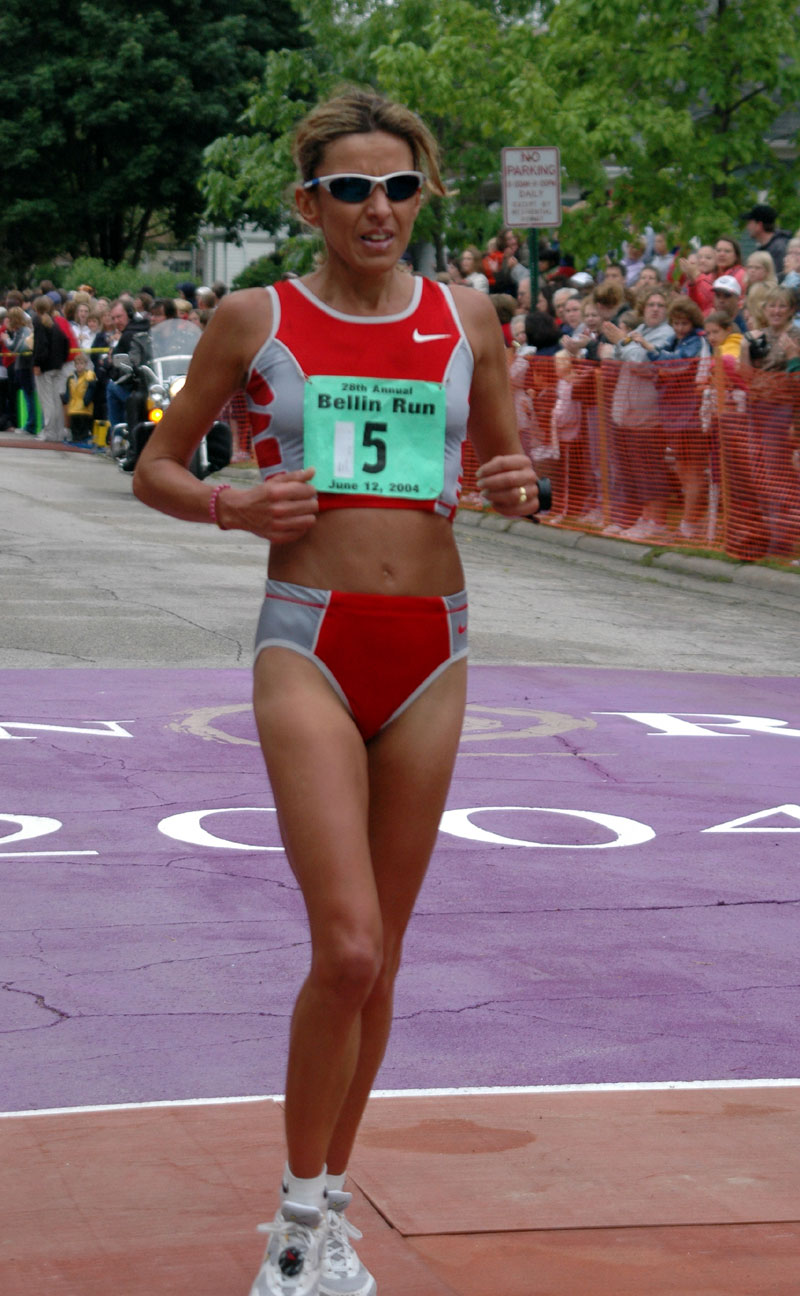
Elana Meyer

Uta Pippig

John Kipsang Korir

=== Notable runners ===
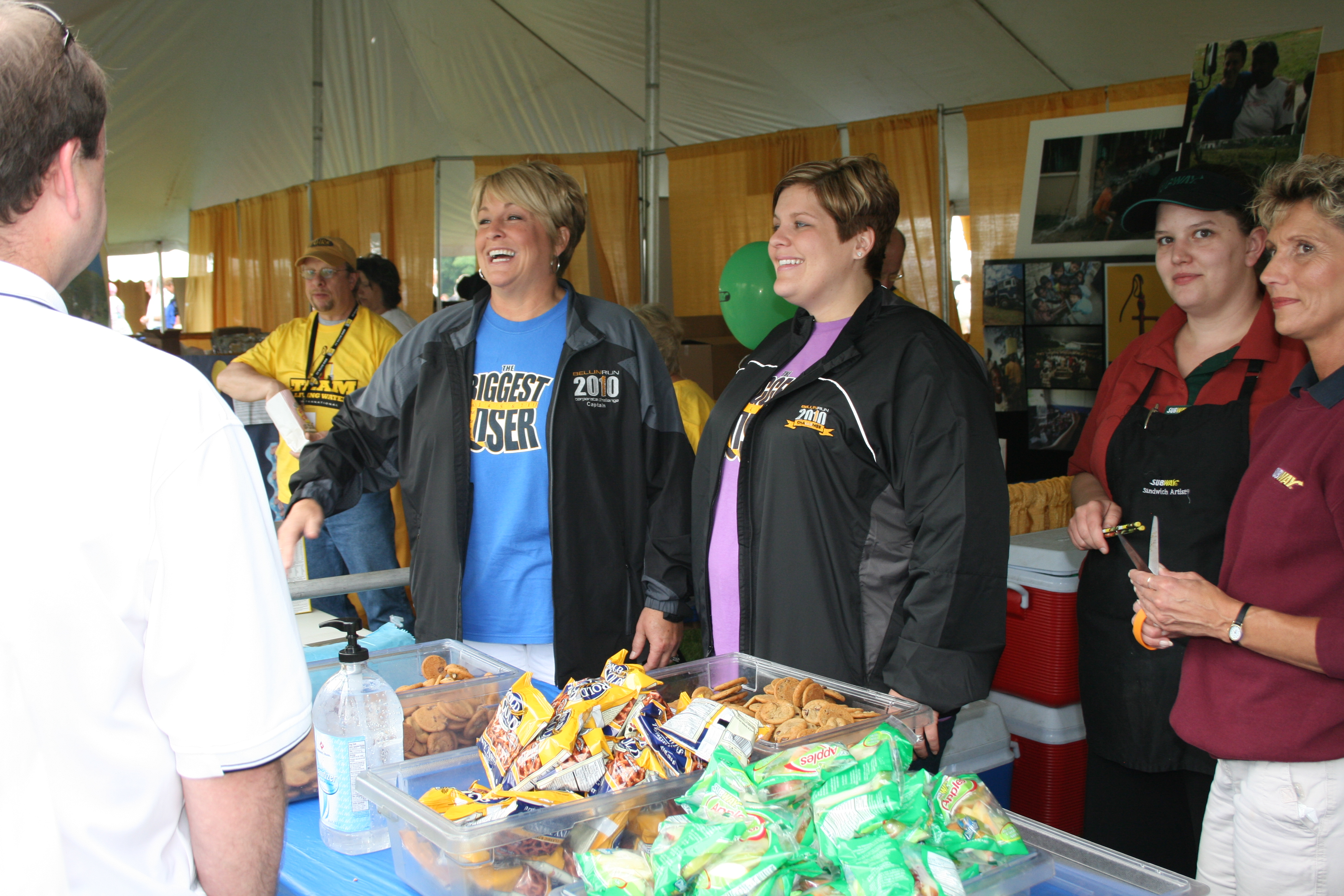
Kristin Steede and Cathy Skell from The Biggest Loser

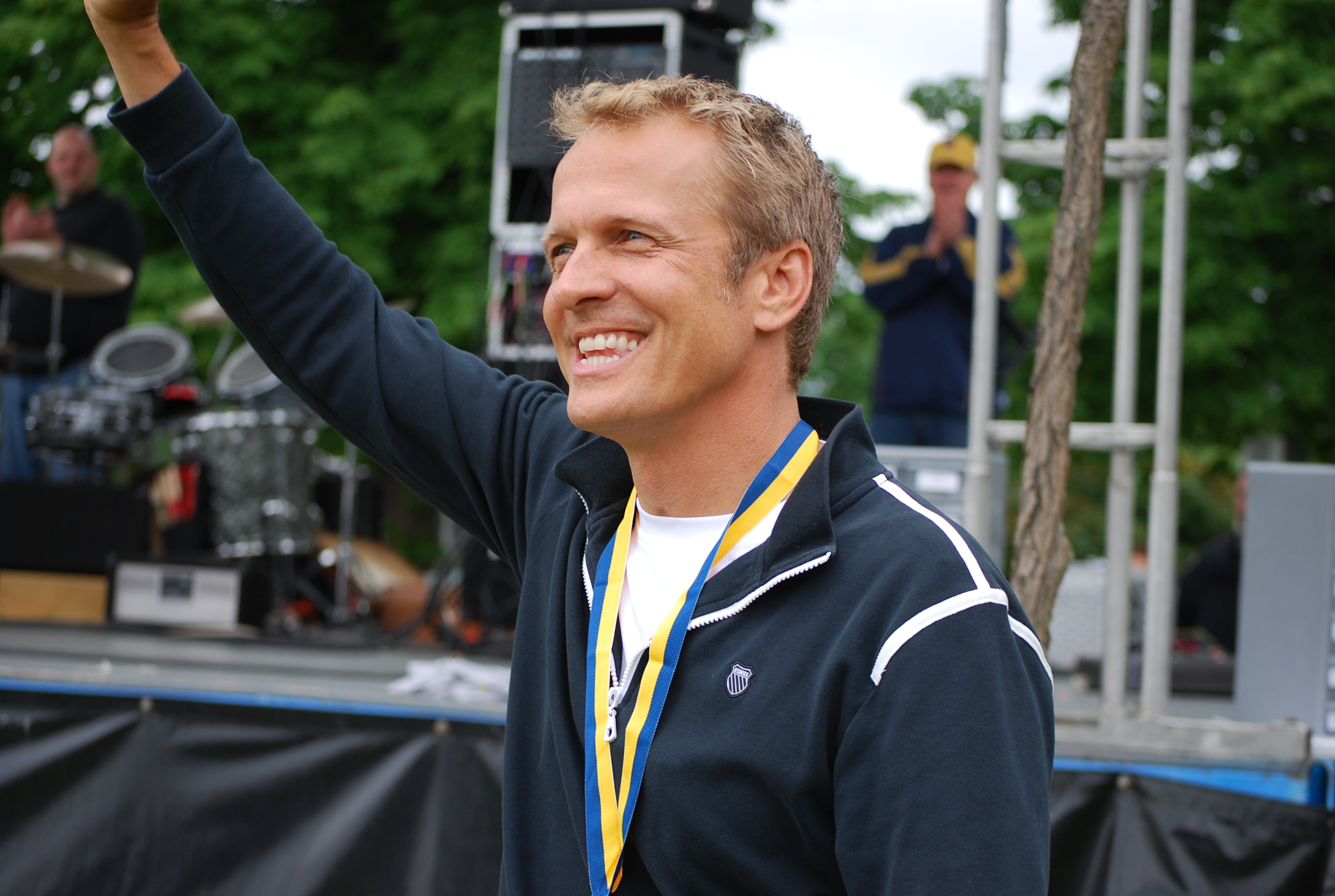
Patrick Fabian, Actor and Bellin Spokesperson

Sarah Reinertsen from The Amazing Race

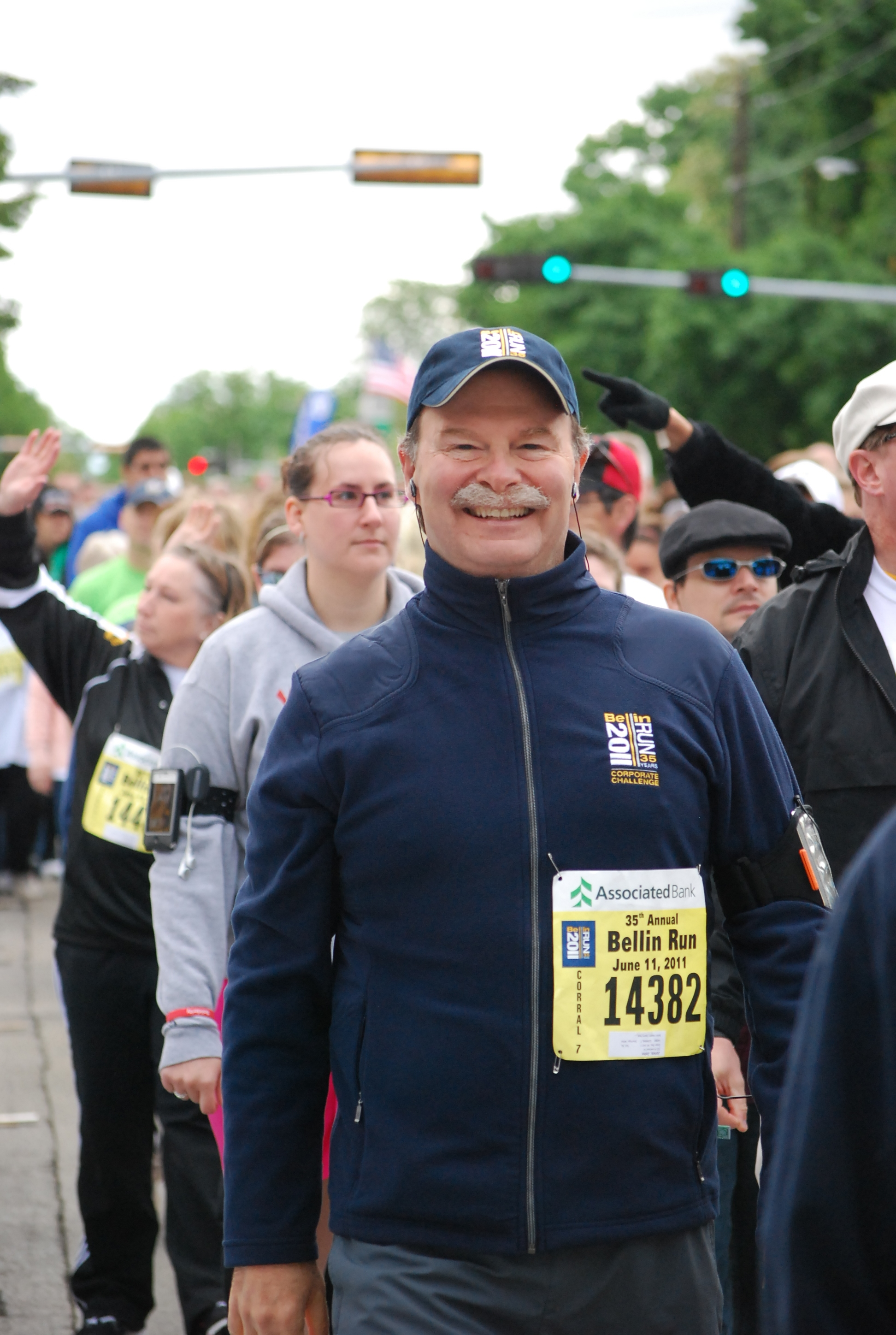
John Jones (American football executive) Former President and Chief Operating Officer of the Green Bay Packers

=== Past winners ===
- All results from official Bellin Run website.

Year	Male runner	Female runner	Male wheelchair	Female wheelchair
1977	Frank Shorter (USA)	Kim Merritt (USA)	X	X
1978	Bill Rodgers (USA)	Kim Merritt (USA)	X	X
1979	Garry Bjorklund (USA)	Kim Merritt (USA)	X	X
1980	Daniel Buntman (USA)	Patti Lyons-Catalano (USA)	X	X
1981	Kyle Heffner (USA)	Marybeth Spencer (USA)	Don Vendello (USA)	Sharon Limpert (USA)
1982	Anthony Sandoval (USA)	Anne Audain (NZL)	Don Vandello (USA)	Mikel Vandello (USA)
1983	Daniel Buntman (USA)	Anne Audain (NZL)	X	X
1984	Simeon Kigen (KEN)	Kim Merritt (USA)	Keith Niemuth (USA)	X
1985	Mark Anderson (USA)	Rosa Mota (POR)	Carl Schott (USA)	X
1986	Mark Anderson (USA)	Joan Samuelson (USA)	Jeff Pagels (USA)	X
1987	Keith Hanson (USA)	Lisa Weidenbach (USA)	Carl Schott (USA)	X
1988	Bruce Bickford (USA)	Joan Samuelson (USA)	Mike Richardson (USA)	X
1989	Max Harn (USA)	Lisa Weidenbach (USA)	Jeff Pagels (USA)	X
1990	Keith Hanson (USA)	Lisa Weidenbach (USA)	Jesse Pontzloff (USA)	X
1991	Ed Eyestone (USA)	Joan Samuelson (USA)	Jeff Pagels (USA)	X
1992	Ed Eyestone (USA)	Joan Samuelson (USA)	Jeff Pagels (USA)	X
1993	Ed Eyestone (USA)	Cassie McWilliam (USA)	John Lealiou (USA)	X
1994	Ed Eyestone (USA)	Cathy O'Brien (USA)	Jason Miller (USA)	Lisa Gutierrez (USA)
1995	Ed Eyestone (USA)	Uta Pippig (GER)	Jeff Pagels (USA)	Lisa Gutierrez (USA)
1996	Dan Held (USA)	Jennifer Crain (USA)	Jeremy Lade (USA)	Lisa Gutierrez (USA)
1997	Joseph Kimani (KEN)	Elana Meyer (RSA)	X	Lisa Gutierrez (USA)
1998	Joseph Kimani (KEN)	Sally Barsosio (KEN)	X	Jean Driscoll (USA)
1999	Joseph Kimani (KEN)	Tegla Loroupe (KEN)	Clayton Peters (USA)	Jean Driscoll (USA)
2000	Joseph Kimani (KEN)	Elana Meyer (RSA)	Joseph Counard (USA)	Jean Driscoll (USA)
2001	James Koskei (KEN)	Elana Meyer (RSA)	Arron Powless (USA)	X
2002	James Koskei (KEN)	Elana Meyer (RSA)	X	X
2003	Albert Chepkurui (KEN)	Kathy Butler (GBR)	Robert Jenkel (USA)	Tabatha Joski (USA)
2004	James Koskei (KEN)	Elva Dryer (USA)	David Samsa (USA)	Melanie Beckman (USA)
2005	John Kipsang Korir (KEN)	Elva Dryer (USA)	David Samsa (USA)	Melanie Beckman (USA)
2006	John Kipsang Korir (KEN)	Kathy Butler (GBR)	Jeff Pagels (USA)	X
2007	John Kipsang Korir (KEN)	Edna Kiplagat (KEN)	David Samsa (USA)	X
2008	John Kipsang Korir (KEN)	Millicent Gathoni (KEN)	Keith lenss (USA)	X
2009	John Yuda (TAN)	Magdalena Lewy Boulet (USA)	David Samsa (USA)	X
2010	John Kipsang Korir (KEN)	Julliah Kerubo Tinega (KEN)	Matthew Barber (USA)	X
2011	Allan Kiprono (KEN)	Julliah Kerubo Tinega (KEN)	Matthew Barber (USA)	X
2012	Allan Kiprono (KEN)	Risper Gesabwa (KEN)	Dean Juntunen (USA)	X
2013	Lani Kiplagat Rutto (KEN)	Risper Gesabwa (KEN)	?	?
2014	Allan Kiprono (KEN)	Risper Gesabwa (KEN)	Dean Juntunen (USA)	?
2015	Allan Kiprono (KEN)	Risper Gesabwa (KEN)	Dean Juntunen (USA)	
2016	Meb Keflezighi (USA)	Risper Gesabwa (KEN)	Dean Juntunen (USA)	
2017	Allan Kiprono (KEN)	Kaitlin Goodman (USA)	Matthew Barber (USA)	?
2018	Brendan Gregg (USA)	Risper Gesabwa (KEN)	?	?
2019	Jared Ward (USA)	Risper Gesabwa (MEX)	?	?

=== Winners by country ===
Country	Men's Race	Women's Race	Total
United States	22	21	43
Kenya	20	13	33
South Africa	0	4	4
Mexico	0	2	2
United Kingdom	0	2	2
New Zealand	0	2	2
Portugal	0	1	1
Germany	0	1	1
Tanzania	1	0	1

=== Corporate Challenge Winners ===
Year	Male Team	Female Team
2006	Georgia-Pacific	YMCA
2007	KI	Bellin Health
2008	KI	Bellin Health
2009	Wisconsin Public Service	Bellin Health
2010	Georgia-Pacific	Bellin Health
2011	KI	Bellin Health
Year	Co-Ed Team	
2012	KI	

=== Bellin Run Record Holders By Age Group ===
Key: Course record

Female				Male			
Age	Name	Time	Year	Age	Name	Time	Year
0-9	Morgan Jindra	46:01	2007	0-9	Cameron Plate	44:07	2011
10-12	Anna Miller	39:28	2008	10-12	Tannor Wagner	38:13	2011
13-14	Bailey Wolf	40:32	2011	13-14	Greg Haanstad	35:39	1984
15-18	Allie Woodward	34:18	2011	15-18	Jim Orthmann	30:55	1982
19-24	Julliah Kerubo Tinega	32:27	2010	19-24	Joseph Kimani	27:46	1997
25-29	Tegla Loroupe	31:48	1999	25-29	Joseph Kimani	28:07	2001
30-34	Elana Meyer	32:05	1999	30:34	James Koskei	28:01	2001
35-39	Uta Pippig	32:50	2001	35-39	James Koskei	29:12	2004
40-44	Joan Samuelson	35:40	2001	40-44	John Campbell	30:01	1991
45-49	Sue Pierson	38:02	2010	45-49	Don Conway	31:21	1986
50-54	Joan Samuelson	36:13	2009	50-54	Fred L. Reeves	33:59	1995
55-59	Joan Samuelson	38:26	2012	55-59	Al Treichel	35:59	1984
60-64	Kitty Thomas-Ciciora	48:08	2011	60-64	Clive Davies	38:15	1983
65-69	Irene Stock	49:16	2011	65-69	Ruben Vigil	42:14	1993
70-74	Lois Gilmore	55:01	2006	70-74	Jerry Lardnois	48:41	2006
75+	Lois Gilmore	58:32	2009	75+	Jerry Lardnois	53:59	2011
Whlchr	Jean Driscoll	25:51	1999	Whlchr	Clayton Peters	24:24	1999
Jr. Whlchr	Christina Ripp	25:53	1999	Jr Whlchr	Joseph Counard	34:56	2000
