= Cherry Blossom Ten Mile Run =

Annual race in the U.S. since 1973

- The official race logo
- Date: April
- Location: Washington, D.C., U.S.
- Event type: Road
- Distance: 10 miles (16 km)
- Primary sponsor: Credit unions in the United States
- Beneficiary: Children's Miracle Network Hospitals
- Established: 1973 (53 years ago)
- Website: http://www.cherryblossom.org/
- Participants: 5888 finishers (2021); 17432 finishers (2019)

The Cherry Blossom Ten Mile Run is an annual 10-mile (16 km) road race in Washington, D.C. Founded in 1973 originally as a precursor training run for elite runners planning to compete in the Boston Marathon, the race has evolved over the years into a local race for runners of all abilities. Nevertheless, it still attracts international running stars such as Catherine Ndereba, Bill Rodgers, John Korir, and Olga Romanova.

The race is scheduled for the first Sunday of each April, meant to coincide with the bloom of the cherry blossoms given as a gift in 1912 from the mayor of Tokyo. The race is part of the National Cherry Blossom Festival of late March and early April in the city.

The race course covers many historic and memorable sights in Washington, D.C. Among the landmarks along the route are the Jefferson Memorial, the Franklin Delano Roosevelt Memorial, the Washington Monument, Arlington National Cemetery, the Lincoln Memorial, the Watergate complex, Rock Creek Park, and the Tidal Basin.

The 2020 in-person edition of the race was cancelled due to the coronavirus pandemic, with all registrants given the option of obtaining a guaranteed non-complimentary entry for 2021 or a full refund. A virtual race was also organized, free and open to all registrants of the cancelled race.

== Winners ==
Key:

Course record (in bold)
Virtual race

Ed.	Year	Men's winner	Time	Women's winner	Time	Rf.
1st	1973	Sam Bair (USA)	51:22	Kathrine Switzer (USA)	1:11:19	
2nd	1974	Jack Mahurin (USA)	50:50	Carol Fridley (USA)	1:02:48	
3rd	1975	Carl Hatfield (USA)	51:47	Julie Shea (USA)	59:55	
4th	1976	Carl Hatfield (USA)	49:09	Julie Shea (USA)	57:04	
5th	1977	Dan Rincon (USA)	49:44	Julie Shea (USA)	56:08	
6th	1978	Bill Rodgers (USA)	48:58	Jennifer White (USA)	56:35	
7th	1979	Bill Rodgers (USA)	48:01	Aileen O'Connor (USA)	56:03	
8th	1980	Bill Rodgers (USA)	47:09	Anne Hird (USA)	55:34	
9th	1981	Bill Rodgers (USA)	47:17	Laurie Binder (USA)	56:44	
10th	1982	Terry Baker (USA)	49:29	Eleanor Simonsick (USA)	58:16	
11th	1983	Greg Meyer (USA)	46:13	Eleanor Simonsick (USA)	53:46	
12th	1984	Simon Kigen (KEN)	47:26	Rosa Mota (POR)	54:16	
13th	1985	Simon Kigen (KEN)	46:24	Lisa Rainsberger (USA)	53:30	
14th	1986	Thom Hunt (USA)	46:15	Rosa Mota (POR)	53:09	
15th	1987	Jon Sinclair (USA)	46:48	Lisa Ondieki (AUS)	52:23	
16th	1988	Jean-Pierre Ndayisenga (BDI)	47:33	Anne Audain (NZL)	53:26	
17th	1989	Brian Sheriff (ZIM)	46:43	Lisa Rainsberger (USA)	52:34	
18th	1990	Chris Fox (USA)	47:06	Lisa Rainsberger (USA)	52:38	
19th	1991	Carl Thackery (GBR)	46:26	Jill Boltz (GBR)	51:57	
20th	1992	Richard Chelimo (KEN)	47:06	Albina Gallyamova (RUS)	53:44	
21st	1993	William Sigei (KEN)	46:29	Judi St. Hilaire (USA)	52:27	
22nd	1994	William Sigei (KEN)	46:01	Hellen Chepngeno (KEN)	54:05	
23rd	1995	Ismael Kirui (KEN)	45:38	Rose Cheruiyot Kosgei (KEN)	51:40	
24th	1996	Lazarus Nyakeraka (KEN)	46:37	Joan Nesbit (USA)	53:25	
25th	1997	Peter Githuka Mwangi (KEN)	46:29	Valentina Yegorova (RUS)	54:28	
26th	1998	Simon Rono (KEN)	45:51	Colleen De Reuck (RSA)	51:16	
27th	1999	Worku Bikila (ETH)	46:59	Jane Omoro (KEN)	53:37	
28th	2000	Reuben Cheruiyot (KEN)	46:07	Teresa Wanjiku (KEN)	55:53	
29th	2001	John Korir Kipsang (KEN)	46:12	Elana Meyer (RSA)	52:16	
30th	2002	Reuben Cheruiyot (KEN)	47:13	Luminița Talpoș (ROM)	52:50	
31st	2003	John Korir Kipsang (KEN)	46:56	Olga Romanova (RUS)	53:43	
32nd	2004	Nelson Kiplagat Birgen (KEN)	48:12	Isabella Ochichi (KEN)	52:07	
33rd	2005	John Korir Kipsang (KEN)	46:55	Nuța Olaru (ROM)	52:01	
34th	2006	Gilbert Okari (KEN)	47:25	Lidiya Grigoryeva (RUS)	52:11	
35th	2007	Tadese Tola (ETH)	46:00.7	Teyba Erkesso (ETH)	51:43.4	
36th	2008	Ridouane Harroufi (MAR)	46:14	Lineth Chepkurui (KEN)	54:21	
37th	2009	Ridouane Harroufi (MAR)	45:56	Lineth Chepkurui (KEN)	53:32	
38th	2010	Stephen Tum (KEN)	45:43	Lineth Chepkurui (KEN)	51:51	
39th	2011	Lelisa Desisa (ETH)	45:36	Julliah Kerubo Tinega (KEN)	54:02	
40th	2012	Allan Kiprono (KEN)	45:15	Julliah Kerubo Tinega (KEN)	54:02	
41st	2013	Daniel Salel Lemashon (KEN)	46:06	Caroline Rotich Cheptanui (KEN)	52:46	
42nd	2014	Stephen Sambu (KEN)	45:29	Mamitu Daska (ETH)	52:05	
43rd	2015	Stephen Sambu (KEN)	43:20 (Note: Pre-race traffic accident altered course to 9.39 miles)	Mary Wacera (KEN)	48:35	
44th	2016	Sam Chelanga (USA)	48:26	Veronica Nyaruai (KEN)	53:12	
45th	2017	Stanley Kebenei (USA)	46:36	Hiwot Gebrekidan (ETH)	53:12	
46th	2018	Jemal Yimer (ETH)	46:17	Buze Diriba (ETH)	53:45	
47th	2019	Jemal Yimer (ETH)	45:36 (Note: A "misplacement of a semi-circle of cones at a turnaround point in the fourth mile" caused this race to be 240 ft (73 m) short.)	Rosemary Wanjiru (KEN)	50:42	
—	2020	Zach Herriott (USA)	50:49	Georganne Watson (USA)	1:02:20	
48th	2021	Edwin Kimutai (KEN)	45:45	Nell Rojas (USA)	52:13	
49th	2022	Nicholas Kosimbei (KEN)	45:15	Susanna Sullivan (USA)	52:32	
50th	2023	Tsegay Kidanu (ETH)	46:08	Sarah Chelangat (UGA)	52:04	
51st	2024	Wesley Kiptoo (KEN)	45:54	Sarah Chelangat (UGA)	51:14	
52nd	2025	Charles Hicks (USA) (Note: Recorded as USA, but has previously represented GBR. Born and raised in London, he maintains USA citizenship through parents. Eligible to represent USA because Cherry Blossom Ten Mile "did not function as a Team USATF selection race.")	**45:14**	Taylor Roe (USA) (Note: Unclear if qualifies as World Record. "Set the world best for an all-women’s race (49:53; previous best 50:32), smashed the previous USATF record of 51:23, crushed the event record of 51:14, and also set a new national 10-K (30:56) and 15-K (46:24) records en route")	**49:53** NR	
53rd	2026					
