= John Korir =

John Korir is the name of:

- John Cheruiyot Korir (born 1981), Kenyan runner, mostly cross-country and track races
- John Korir Kipsang (born 1975), Kenyan runner, mostly competes at road races in the US
- John Korir (runner, born 1996), Kenyan runner, winner of the Chicago Marathon (2024) and Boston Marathon (2025, 2026)
