= Anne Hird =

Retired female middle and long-distance runner

Anne Hird (née Sullivan, born April 8, 1959) is a retired American middle-distance and long-distance runner who was the U.S. national champion for the distances of 30 kilometers and 10 miles. She has won multiple national and international races.

== Professional career ==
As a high schooler, Anne Sullivan won races and set records in the Rhode Island high schools. She would later be inducted into the state's interscholastic hall of fame (in 2006). She began college at Harvard University, where she was the fastest on her team and an All-American, but transferred to Brown University where she ran for the Brown Bears in track and cross country. She set records in the 3,000 and 5,000 meter races for the Ivy League Conference during the 1979 Outdoor Championships. She went to the woman's national final that year for the 10,000 meter race, finishing sixth.

While she was a 20-year-old student at Brown, she took on the Cherry Blossom Ten Mile Run, which was the US National Championship for 1980. She led the crowd of 685 women to a fast finish in 55:34, busting Joan Benoit's previous course record by eight seconds. At the 25K New England Athletic's Congress race that year, she finished second to Nancy Conz, who set an American record in the race. She graduated in 1982, a year before women would be allowed to compete in the NCAA National Championships. In 1986, she would be added to the Brown University Athletics Hall of Fame.

From 1980–1983, she was a top finisher at the Eugene Marathon, the Montreal Marathon and the Tokyo Marathon, where she was just behind Jane Wipf.

In 1983, she won several races including the Brooklyn Half Marathon.

In 1984, she cruised to victory in the National Championship 30K at Albany, New York, finishing in 1:45:15.

It was a big year for her, though at the 1984 Olympic Trials Marathon in Olympia, Washington, she dropped out due to a stomach virus as Joan Benoit went on to win. She had been at the Boston Marathon in April, where she sought a training run, stopped a few times to fix her shoes, but finished as the first American woman, behind the winner from New Zealand, Lorraine Moller. She was the only American in the top 10 women that year.

Then she went to Duluth, Minnesota, for Grandma's Marathon, where she led Sissel Grottenberg and other top runners to win in 2:37:30. She went on to Toronto in September, where she raced on into a gusting wind against an international field to break the tape first and take home more than $4,000. She also won the Newport, Rhode Island, Ocean State Marathon that year in November. Her accolades prompted Sports Illustrated to feature her as a top American distance woman.

== Personal life ==
Hird lives in Providence, Rhode Island, with her husband Jonathan. She proceeded to earn a Masters degree from Simmons College and a PhD at University of Rhode Island. She teaches Instructional Technology at Bridgewater State University and published "Learning from Cyber-Savvy Students" in 2000.
