= Elva Dryer =

American long-distance runner

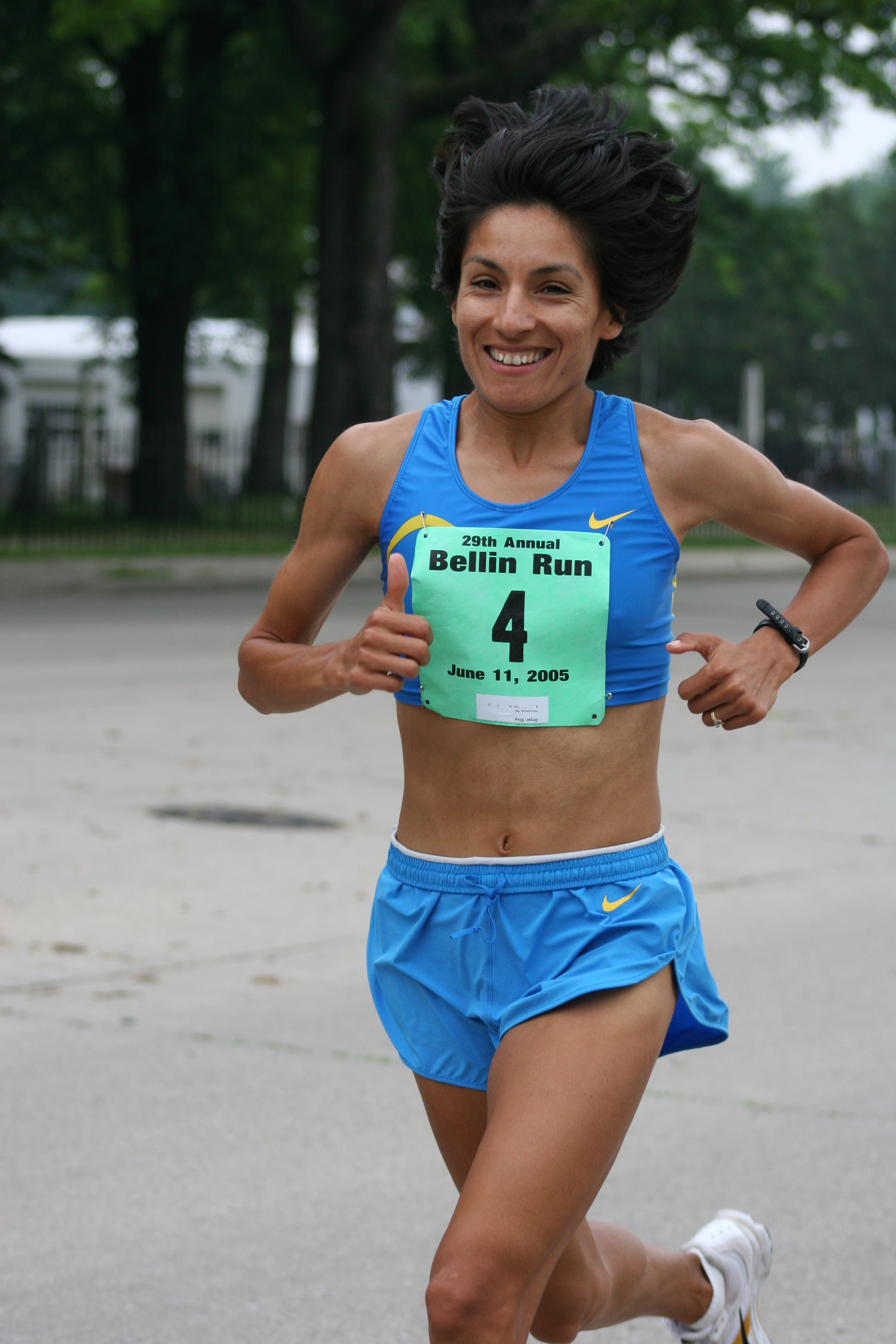
- Dryer at the Bellin Run, 2005

Personal information
- Born: September 26, 1971 (age 54) Durango, Colorado, U.S.
- Height: 5 ft 5 in (1.65 m)
- Weight: 110 lb (50 kg)

Sport
- Country: United States
- Sport: Athletics

Elva Dryer (née Martinez; born September 26, 1971) is an American long-distance runner who competed mostly in the 5000 and 10,000 meters, before turning to road running. She represented the United States at the 2000 and 2004 Summer Olympics.

Dryer went to college at Western Colorado University where she won seven NCAA DII individual national championships and one NAIA national team championship in cross country. She and fellow alumnae Nicole Aish have trained together in Colorado.

== Competition record ==
Year	Competition	Venue	Position	Event	Notes
Representing the United States
1999	World Championships	Seville, Spain	34th (h)	5000 m	16:15.70 min
2000	Olympic Games	Sydney, Australia	19th (h)	5000 m	15:23.99 min
2001	World Championships	Edmonton, Canada	20th (h)	5000 m	15:26.04 min
2003	World Championships	Paris, France	17th	10,000 m	31:59.81 min
2004	Olympic Games	Athens, Greece	19th	10,000 m	32:18.16 min
2009	World Half Marathon Championships	Birmingham, United Kingdom	47th	Half marathon	1:16:42 h

== Personal bests ==
Outdoor

- 1500 meters – 4:10.28 (Saint-Denis 2001)
- One mile – 4:33.57 (Uniondale 1998)
- 3000 meters – 8:46.09 (Eugene 2001)
- 5000 meters – 15:03.56 (Oslo 2001)
- 10,000 meters – 31:21.92 (Palo Alto 2005)
- 10 kilometers – 32:28 (Mobile 2002)
- 15 kilometers – 48:46 (Jacksonville 2002)
- 20 kilometers – 1:07:18 (New Haven 2007)
- Half marathon – 1:11:42 (Houston 2007)
- Marathon – 2:31:48 (Chicago 2006)

Indoor

- One mile – 4:36.62 (Indianapolis 1998)
- 3000 meters – 8:57.60 (Atlanta 2001)
