= John Korir Kipsang =

Kenyan athlete (born 1975)

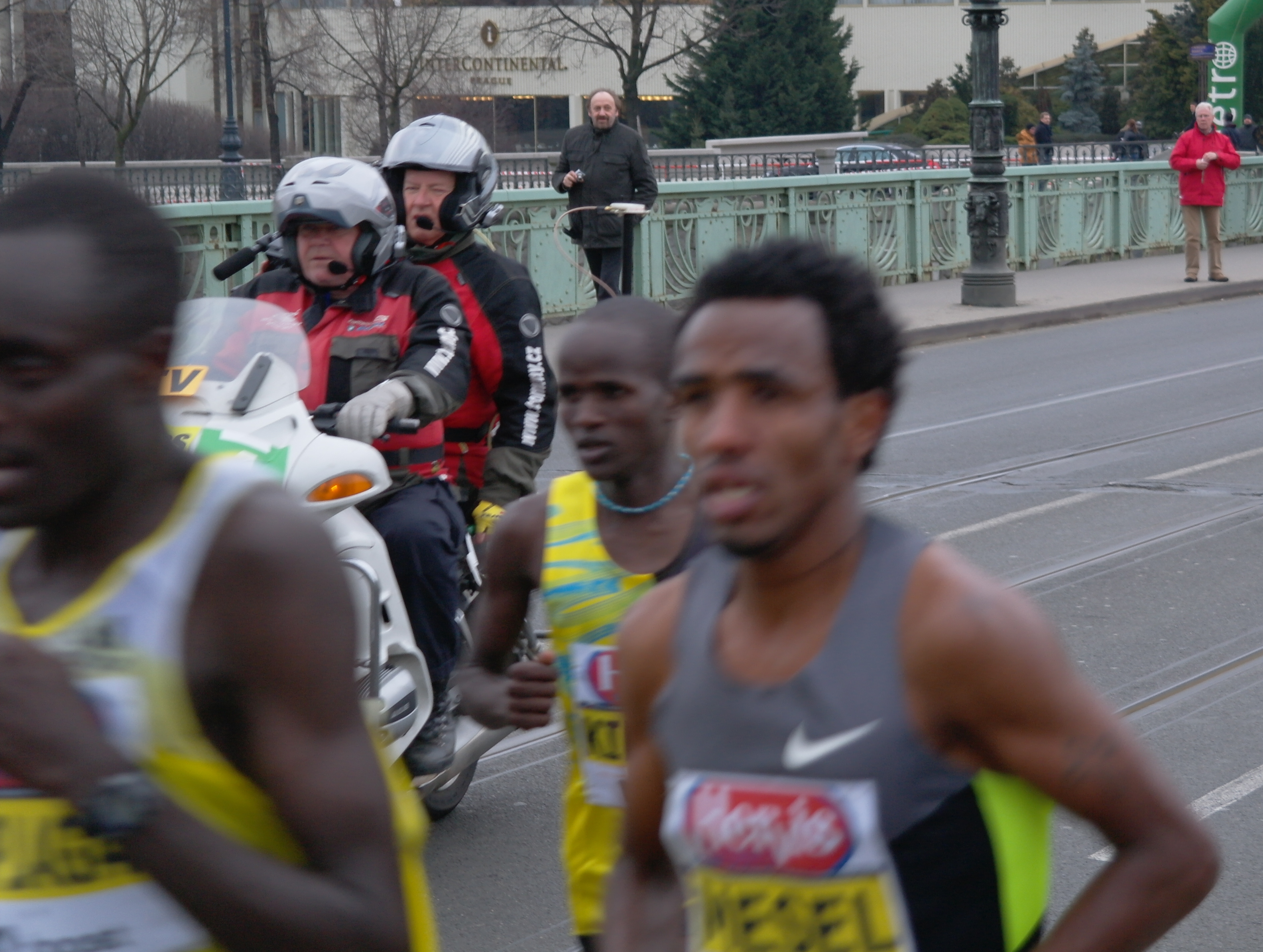
Prague Half Marathon 2013 - leading group crossing Čechův

John Korir Kipsang (born December 15, 1975) is a Kenyan athlete who specializes in road running.

Korir won against the similarly named John Cheruiyot Korir at the 2002 Lisbon Half Marathon and 2005 Cherry Blossom Ten Mile Run, while John Cheruiyot Korir won at a cross country event in Kenya in 2003.

He trains with Kimbia Athletics and is coached by Dieter Hogen.

== Achievements ==
Korir has won several road races, including:

- Boilermaker Road Race (1999, 2001, 2003, 2004)
- Peachtree Road Race (2001)
- Cherry Blossom Ten Mile Run (2003, 2005)
- World's Best 10K (2004, 2005)
- Bix 7 (1998, 1999, 2001, 2003, 2004)
- Bellin Run (2005, 2006, 2007, 2008, 2010)
- Lilac Bloomsday Run (2003, 2005, 2007)
- Bay to Breakers (2007, 2008)
- Steamboat Classic (2006, 2007)

=== Personal bests ===
Track

- 5000 metres - 13:34.41 (1999)
- 10,000 metres - 28:13.52 (2007)

Road

- 10 kilometres - 27:47 min (2004)
- 15 kilometres - 42:57 (2001)
- 10 miles - 46:12 min (2001)
- Half marathon - 60:47 min (2004)
