= Gilbert Okari =

Kenyan long-distance runner (born 1978)

Personal information
- Born: July 2, 1978 (age 47) Kenya

Sport
- Country: Kenya
- Event(s): 10 km, 5 km, Half Marathon

Achievements and titles
- Personal best(s): 5000 m: 13:55.0 5k road: 13:28; 10000 m: 27:40.9; 10k road: 27:28; Half Marathon: 1:01.26 Marathon : 2:23:02

Gilbert Okari is a retired Kenyan professional long-distance runner. He competed at the professional level in distances 5k through Marathon. Okari has won 26 major races and earned over US$280,000 in prize money.

== Professional career ==
Throughout his career, Okari competed at dozens of major track and road racing events. He has won races including the Ajc Peachtree Road Race, Beach to Beacon 10k, World's Best 10k, Lilac Bloomsday Run and Bay to Breakers. Okari has also represented Kenya in international competition.

=== Competition record ===
Kenyan National Competition
Date	Event	Distance	Venue	Time	Place
07 Feb 2003	Inter-Provincial Kenya Police Cross Country Champs	4 km	Nairobi	12:32	5th
29 May 2004	Kenya Police Championships	5 km	Nairobi	14:17.7	4th
30 May 2002	Kenya Police Inter-Provincial Championships	10 km	Nairobi	28:44.2	2nd
31 May 2002	Kenya Police Inter-Provincial Championships	5 km	Nairobi	14:06.1	3rd
02 Jul 2003	Kenya Police Inter-Provincial Championships	10 km	Nairobi	28:52.2	1st
21 May 2005	Kenya Police National Athletics Championships	10 km	Kasarani	29:22.0	2nd
12 Jul 2003	Kenyan Championships	10 km	Nairobi	28:31.8	4th
22 Jun 2002	Kenyan Championships	10 km	Nairobi	28:06.62	7th
16 Jun 2005	Kenyan Championships	10 km	Nairobi	28:11.0	3rd
17 Jun 2006	Kenyan Police Championships	10 km	Nairobi	28:43.8	2nd
29 Jan 2006	Kenyan Police Cross Country Championships	12 km	Nairobi	39:00	6th
25 Jul 2003	Kenyan World Championships Trials	10 km	Nairobi	28:15.8	3rd

International Competition Representing Kenya
Date	Event	Distance	Venue	Time	Place
12 Oct 2003	All-Africa Games	10 km	Abuja NGR	28:04.88	7th
01 Oct 2005	IAAF World Championships	Half Marathon	Edmonton AB, CAN	1:04:17	25th
