= Joseph Kimani =

Kenyan long-distance runner

Joseph Kimani (September 1, 1972 – November 1, 2012) was a Kenyan long-distance runner who competed over 10,000 metres on the track and in road running competitions.

In his native country, he was commonly referred to as "KK" for Kimani Karanja. In other parts of the world, he was king of the road. He was the Superstar of most road races in the 1990s. He won 11 of the 13 road races in one season and finished second in 2 of them.

== Track career ==
Kimani finished 6th in the 10000 metres at the 1995 World Championships in Athletics.

== Road running career ==
In 1996 at the Boilermaker Road Race Kimani set the record for fastest time in the race's 18 years of being held at 42:40.

In 1996 at the Peachtree Road Race Kimani set the world record 10k run at 27:04.

Kimani finished 21st at the 1998 IAAF World Half Marathon Championships and 4th at the 2000 IAAF World Half Marathon Championships.

In 1996, Kimani won the 10 kilometre Vancouver Sun Run with a record breaking time of 27:31.

== Death ==
Kimani died of pneumonia on November 1, 2012.
