= James Koskei =

Kenyan runner

Personal information
- Born: 23 November 1968 (age 57) Eldoret, Kenya
- Occupation: Runner

James Koskei (born 23 November 1968 in Eldoret) is a Kenyan runner.

At the 1999 World Cross Country Championships he finished fifth in the short race, earning a place on the Kenyan team that won the team competition.

Nowadays he runs marathons. His personal record, 2:14:02, was run at the 2007 Dubai Marathon where he placed 9th. At the 2007 Boston Marathon, he finished 4th.

He is a former football player. He started running in 1995 when he joined the Kenyan Army. He is married to Joyce and has three children Ivy, Vincent and Euticas

He trains with Kimbia Athletics and is coached by Dieter Hogen.

He is not to be confused with James Kiplagat Kosgei (born 1984), another Kenyan runner.
