= Municipal Pier =

Municipal Pier may refer to:

- Navy Pier, Chicago
- Municipal Pier (San Francisco)
