= Shipwright's Cottage =

Historic building in San Francisco

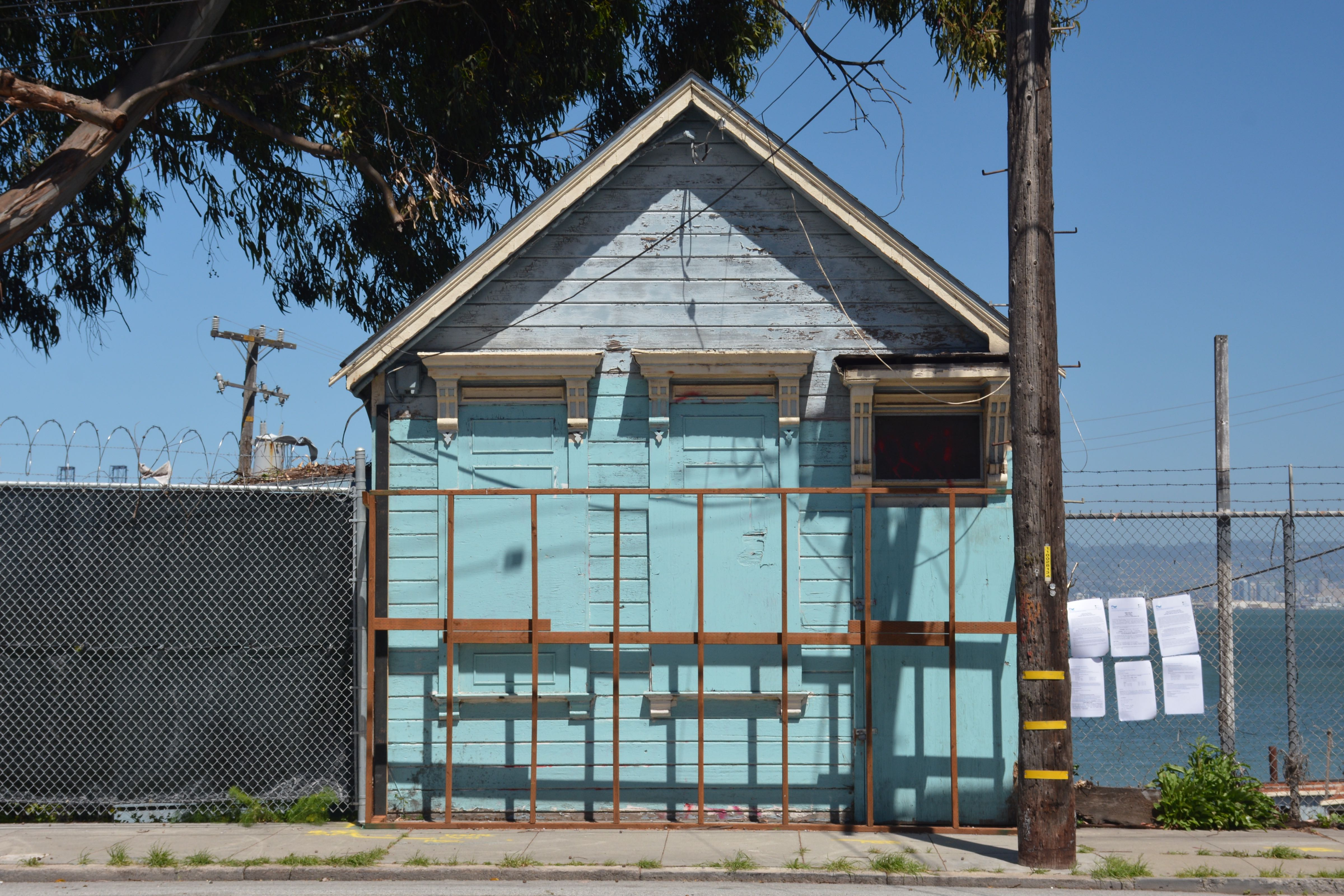
- Shipwright's Cottage (2019)

- Location within San Francisco County Location within California Location within the United States
- 37.732285°N 122.375763°W
- Location: 900 Innes Avenue, San Francisco, California, U.S.

History
- Built: c. 1875

Site notes
- Architect: Jan Dirks
- Architectural styles: Italianate, Carpenter Gothic

San Francisco Designated Landmark
- Designated: May 9, 2008
- Reference no.: 250

Shipwright's Cottage is a historic house built c. 1875 and located at 900 Innes Avenue in India Basin, San Francisco, California. The building is part of a new city park called India Basin Waterfront Park, completed in 2025. It is thought that the property has one of the only natural Bay shoreline remaining in San Francisco.

Shipwright's Cottage has been listed as a San Francisco Designated Landmark since May 9, 2008. It is now called the Shipwright's Cottage Community Room.

== History ==
The house was originally occupied by shipwrights (or ship builders) that built scow schooners, from approximately 1875 until 1926. It was constructed by carpenter and shipwright Jan Janse Dirks, (later Americanized to John Johnson Dirks) who was born in the Netherlands. Dirks lived in the cottage with his family until 1892 when he retired from shipbuilding. Among the scow schooners he and his sons built at the adjacent boatyard were the Master Mariner (1876), the Wavelet (1878) and the Paul and Willie (1884). The cottage structure was made with fir wood, and in Italianate and Carpenter Gothic architecture styles. It originally had a windmill on the 2.4-acre property, with a private waterfront view.

From 1926 until 1961, the building served as the Anderson & Cristofani boatyard office. In the 1990s, the boatyard was shut down by the United States Environmental Protection Agency for illegal dredging; and the house eventually was sold to neglectful owners and fell into disrepair.

Famous boats built and repaired in India Basin boatyards include the scow schooner Alma (1891), now located at the San Francisco Maritime National Historical Park, World War II-era Victory Launch boats, and possibly Jack London's boat the Snark.

== Modern-day ==
In 2008, the land at 900 Innes Street was donated by Joe Cassidy, a local developer, to the Tenderloin Housing Clinic for the purpose of building neighborhood housing. In September 2010, the abandoned house had a roof fire, which added city agencies to pressure the Tenderloin Housing Clinic to renovate the building.

In 2014, the city of San Francisco purchased the house and the land. The Shipwright's Cottage was featured in the Joe Talbot film, The Last Black Man in San Francisco (2019).

In 2019, a US$25 million dollar grant from the John Pritzker Family Fund was awarded to help create an 8-acre park, encompassing the property. Construction for the city park took place from 2020 until 2025, and surrounds the former boatyard, and include the newly-restored Shipwright's Cottage building, which will serve as the park's visitor center.

== See also ==
- List of San Francisco Designated Landmarks
