= Kim Chambers (swimmer) =

New Zealand open water swimmer

Kimberley Chambers
Personal information
- Nationality: New Zealand
- Born: New Zealand

Sport
- Sport: Swimming

Kimberley Chambers is a marathon open water swimmer from New Zealand. She is the sixth person in the world to complete the Ocean's Seven swimming challenge. In 2015, she became the first woman to swim from the Farallon Islands to the Golden Gate Bridge – a distance of about 48 km (30 miles).

== Life ==
Chambers was born in New Zealand and grew up on a sheep farm near Te Kūiti in the King Country in the North Island. She moved to San Francisco when she was 17 years old to study for a master's degree in science at the University of California, Berkeley.

In 2007, Chambers suffered a fall while walking down stairs and almost had her leg amputated; she was diagnosed with acute compartment syndrome and warned it was likely she would never be able to walk unaided. She spent two years in physical therapy and took up swimming to develop her strength, followed by ocean swimming as a challenge. She joined two open water swimming clubs in San Francisco: Dolphin Club and South End Rowing Club. She began swimming all over the world, including in New Zealand, where she swam the Cook Strait between the North and South Islands. Within a year she had completed three of the Ocean's Seven challenge swims and went on to complete all seven.

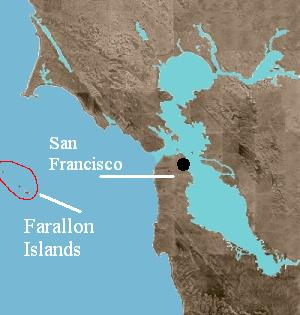
She swam from the Farallon Islands to the Golden Gate Bridge at San Francisco

In August 2015, Chambers became the first woman to swim from the Farallon Islands to the Golden Gate Bridge – a distance of about 48 km (30 miles). The same year Chambers was nominated for a Halberg Award in her native New Zealand. In 2017 a documentary film, Kim Swims, was released by independent filmmaker Kate Webber; the film follows Chambers' 2015 Farallon Islands swim.

Chambers supports the efforts of the local pollution watchdog San Francisco Baykeeper, and serves on the organisation's Leadership Circle in order to raise awareness about their mission for Bay protection. Many of her swims are also fundraisers for charities, such as the Semper Fi Fund and the Colibri Centre for Human Rights.

Chambers is a member of the Explorers Club and she was the first New Zealand woman to be inducted into the International Marathon Swimming Hall of Fame.

=== Recognition ===
In 2015 she was nominated for the Halberg Awards’ High Performance Sport New Zealand Sportswoman of the Year. At the WOWSA Awards she has won 2013 and 2014 World Open Water Swimming Woman of the Year and was nominated for 2015 World Open Water Swimming Performance of the Year.

== Swims ==
Date	Location	Type	Coordinates	Description
Nov, 2016	Dead Sea			
Sept, 2016	Sacramento to Tiburon	Solo Swim		A 150 km (93-mile) swim aborted after 87 km (54 miles) due to strong winds
8 Aug 2015	The Farallon Islands	Solo Swim	37.6989° N, 123.0034° W	First woman and fifth person to swim the 48 km (30 mile) route solo; completed in 17 hours and 12 minutes.
27 Sep 2014	North Channel	Solo Swim	55° 3′ 27″ N, 5° 37′ 19″ W	First New Zealander, third woman and sixth person to complete this route.
3 Jul 2014	Tsugaru Strait	Solo Swim	41.6324° N, 140.6910° E	
13 Sep 2013	English Channel	Solo Swim	50.1347° N, 0.3571° W	Completed in 12 hours and 12 minutes
18 Jul 2013	The Catalina Channel	Solo Swim	33° 23′ 0″ N, 118° 25′ 0″ W	A 30.5 km (20.2 mile) waterway off Long Beach California
1 May 2013	The Strait of Gibraltar	Solo Swim	35.9982° N, 5.6879° W	375th person to complete this route
10 Nov 2012	Molokai Channel	Solo Swim	21° 8′ 0″ N, 157° 2′ 0″ W'	42 km swim between the islands of O'ahu and Moloka'i in Hawaii
1 Sep 2012	San Francisco to Santa Barbara	Relay Swim	21° 8′ 0″ N, 157° 2′ 0″ W	6-person relay swim 33
August 2012	Lake Tahoe	Solo Swim		35 km swim
March 2012	Cook Strait	Solo Swim		South Island to Wellington
2011	English Channel	Relay Swim		
2010	Alcatraz to San Francisco	Solo Swim		
