= Dolphin Club (San Francisco) =

Swimming and boating athletic club

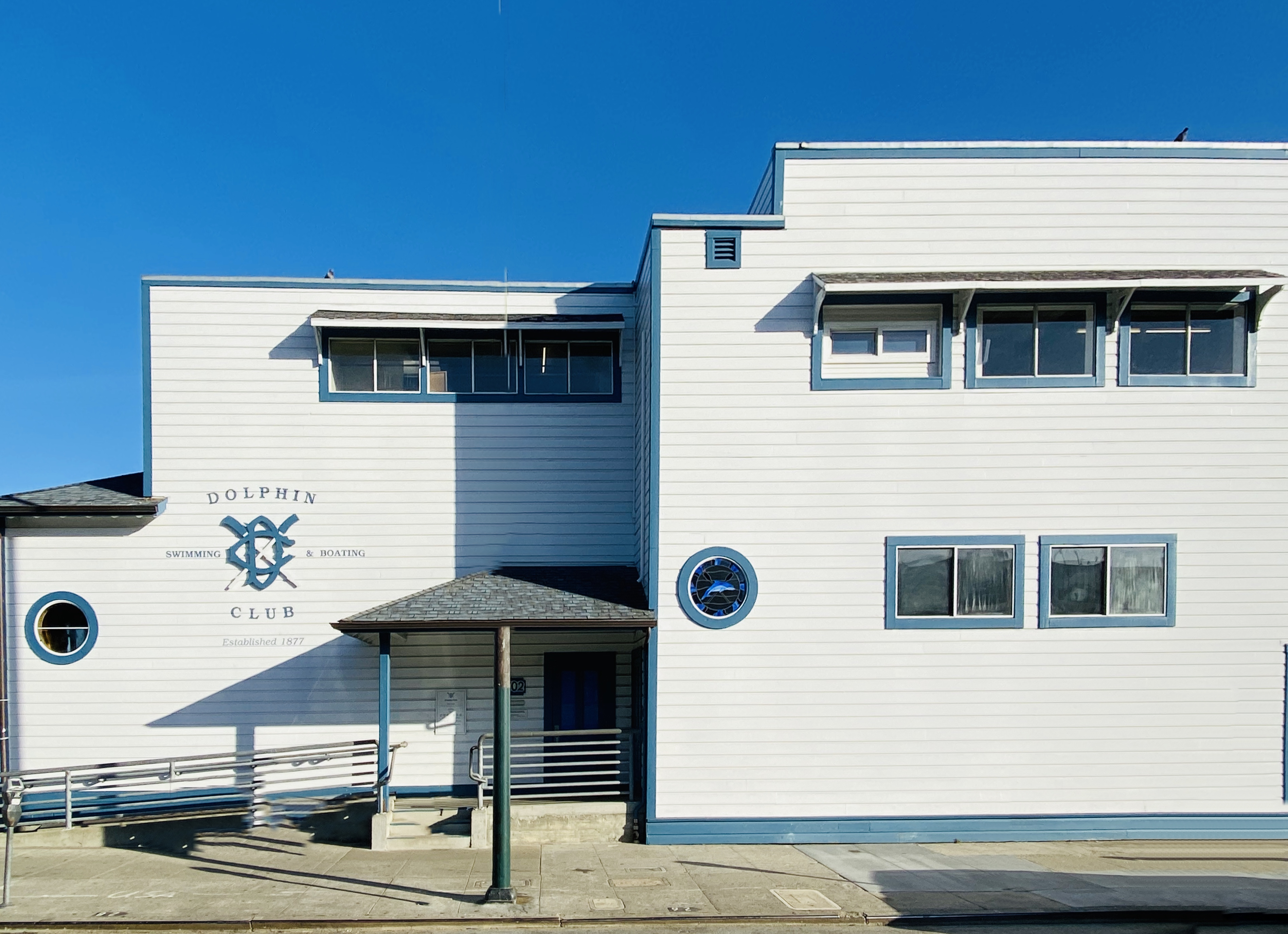

- Location: 502 Jefferson Street, San Francisco, Calif., U.S.
- Coordinates: 37°48′28″N 122°25′17″W
- Home water: Aquatic Park Cove
- Founded: 1877; 149 years ago
- Former names: Dolphin Swimming and Boating Club
- Key people: John Hornor (President)
- Membership: 1,500
- Colours: Blue and White
- Website: dolphinclub.org
- Acronym: DC

The Dolphin Club, also known as the Dolphin Swimming and Boating Club, is an athletic club in San Francisco, California. It caters to open water swimming, rowing, kayaking, stand up paddleboarding, and 4-wall handball.

The clubhouse and boat house buildings are owned by the San Francisco Recreation & Parks Department and leased to the club. The club had 1,000 members in 2010, and claims 1,500 members today.

== History ==
The Dolphin Swimming and Rowing Club was founded in July 1877 by a small group of German immigrants, including John Wieland, Valentine Kehrlein Sr. and their respective sons, together with Edward J Borremans, Louis Schroeder, Edward Peterson, Adolph C. Lutgens and Ernest H. Lutgens, who wanted to form a private sporting and social club, along similar lines to the Turnverein, a club which they had been members of in Bavaria. Membership of the club was originally limited to 25 members. Emil Arthur Kehrlein, the eldest son of Valentine Sr., served as the club's inaugural president. The club petitioned the San Francisco Board of Supervisors to erect a small clubhouse/equipment shack and pier at the junction of Beach and Leavenworth Streets, an area known as Bilge Water Cove. They were granted permission in April 1878. A surplus building was acquired from the Union Iron Works and the new building took a month to erect.

In 1881, the club expelled seven members including Emil and his brother Valetine Jr. The brothers would later establish the nearby Triton Rowing Club, and, in 1899, founded the Hotel Nymphia brothel. By 1886, the club had increased to over fifty members and was formally incorporated in 1888. In 1887, the club added the 40 feet (12 m) river barge, John Wieland, to its fleet.

In 1895, facing increasing development of the waterfront the club resolved to relocate to a more protected site at the foot of Van Ness Avenue. Adolph C. Lutgens, an architect, was responsible for designing the club's boathouse in 1896 The club constructed a new clubhouse in February 1897, at a cost of $1,800, at the edge of Black Point Cove.

The clubhouse/boathouse has since been moved twice, once in 1927 and again in 1937 to what is its current location on the corner of Hyde and Jefferson Streets. The relocation of the building was necessitated by the extension of Van Ness Avenue, the construction of municipal pier, and the development of Aquatic Park Cove including the municipal public bathing bathhouse (which was originally intended to be the home of the Dolphin and South End clubs) and grandstand in 1936. Since 1949, the club has maintained a print magazine called the Dolphin Log.

In 1956, Les Hedry, a rowing member who had done races with the club on the San Joaquin River near Stockton, organized a row from the club to Sacramento, approximately 105 miles, initially to visit the State Fair. The club would soon make the Sacramento Row an annual event.

In 1976, six women brought up a lawsuit that resulted in the Dolphin Club and the South End Rowing Club allowing women to become members. Their lawyer noted that "the basis of the suit was not gender bias, but federal law that governed any institution operating on public parkland". Women officially joined in 1977, and as of 2019, make up about a third of the membership.

== Boat fleet ==
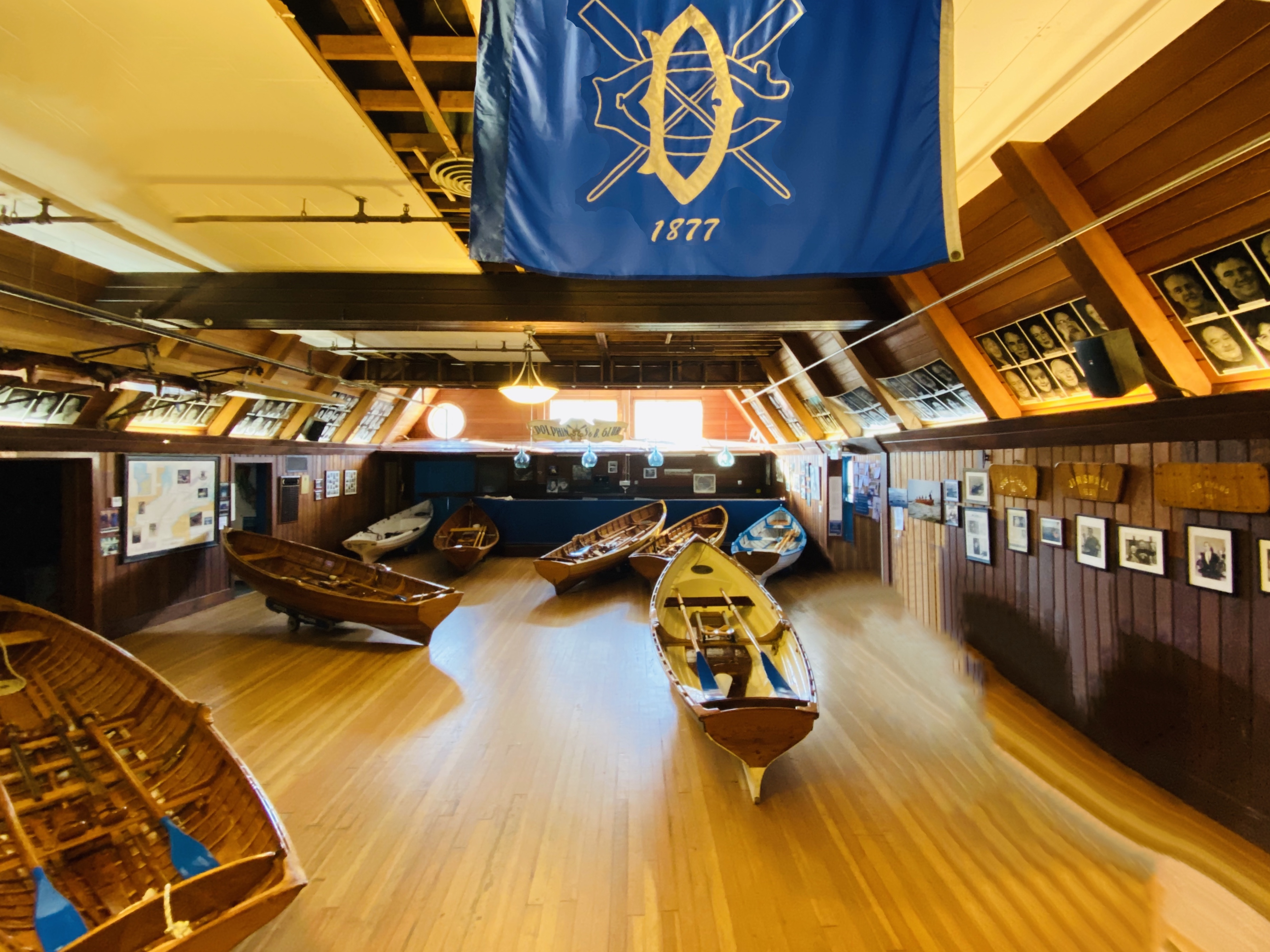
Boathouse room showing single position row boats

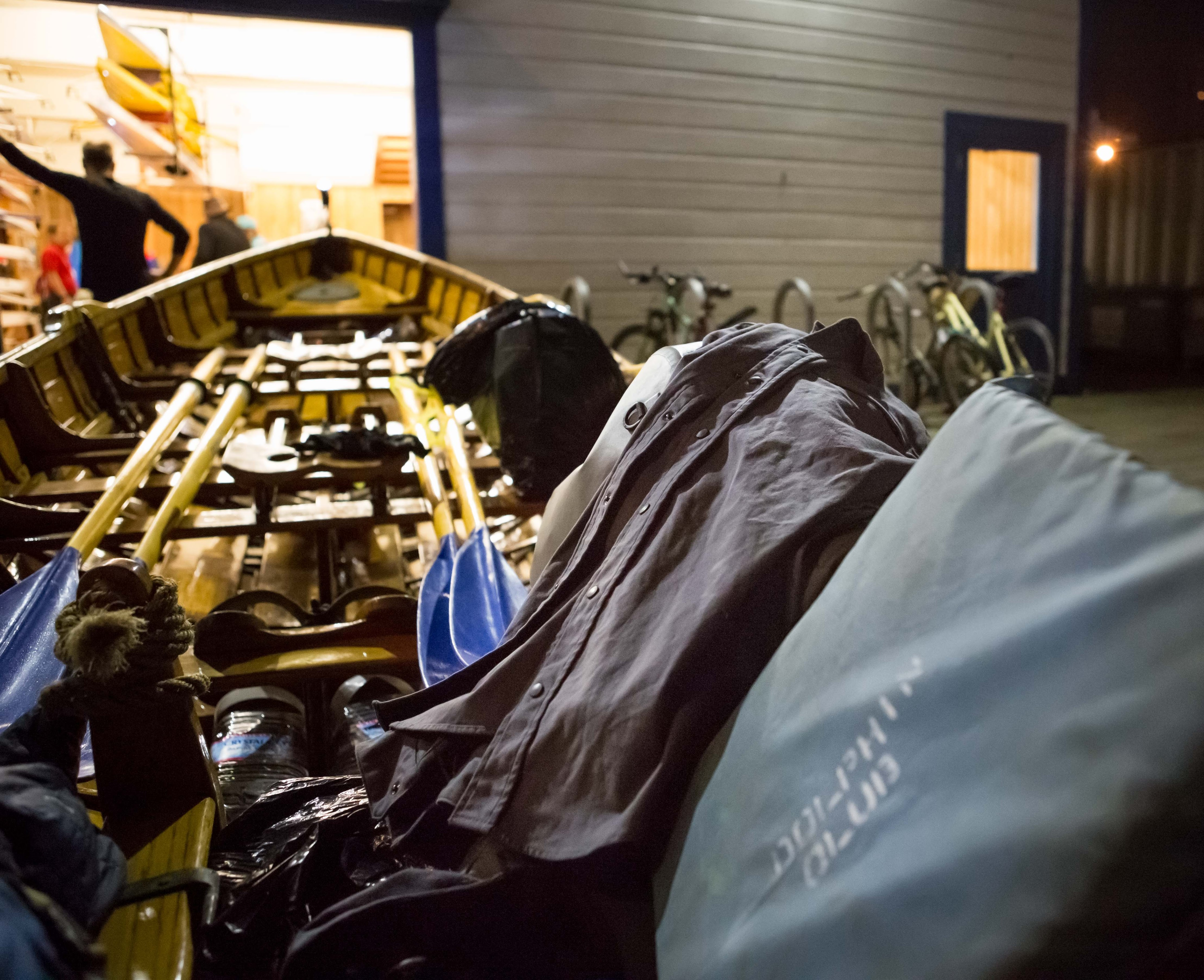
Dolphin Club rowboat in early morning light with oars and flotation seats

The Dolphin Club has more than 34 wooden, fiberglass and carbon rowboats, almost all with sliding seats. The club also has kayaks, standup paddleboards, and motorized zodiacs. Among the wooden boats, the most often rowed is the Kohlenberg, Mo-B, and Lifthrasir, respectively. The Kohlenberg was rowed 136 times in 2023, or about once every 3 days.

The whitehalls and other wooden rowboats are built from oak, mahogany, cedar (seats, breasthook, burden boards), apple (breasthook, knees), and black locust (breasthook, ribs). Three kinds of cedar are used, Port Orford cedar from Oregon, Alaskan yellow and Spanish cedar. Two kinds of mahogany are used, Honduras and African mahogany. Since 1990, the club has harvested black locust wood from a grove in Isleton, California. Black locust are known for its resistance to rot, durability and straight grain, making it desirable for use as fence posts and wooden boats.

Wooden rowboats by year, class, weight, and length
| Name | Build Year | Type | Weight lbs. | Length |
|---|---|---|---|---|
| Wieland | 1887 | Six-Oared Sweep Barge | 588 pounds (267 kg) | 40 feet 0 inches (12.19 m) |
| Viking | 1916 | Double Cable Car Gig | 270 pounds (120 kg) | 22 feet 0 inches (6.71 m) |
| Farrell | 1917 | Double Dolphin Club | 350 pounds (160 kg) | 18 feet 0 inches (5.49 m) |
| Cronin | 1938 | Double Dolphin Club | 376 pounds (171 kg) | 18 feet 0 inches (5.49 m) |
| Hughes | 1938 | Double Dolphin Club | 380 pounds (170 kg) | 18 feet 0 inches (5.49 m) |
| Baggiani | 1948 | Single Dolphin Club | 207 pounds (94 kg) | 14 feet 0 inches (4.27 m) |
| Foster | 1948 | Single Dolphin Club | 198 pounds (90 kg) | 14 feet 0 inches (4.27 m) |
| Landucci | 1948 | Single Dolphin Club | 209 pounds (95 kg) | 14 feet 0 inches (4.27 m) |
| Spectre | 1973 | Single Whitehall | 261 pounds (118 kg) | 13 feet 0 inches (3.96 m) |
| Good Luck | 1976 | Single Stillwater River Boat | 187 pounds (85 kg) | 15 feet 5 inches (4.70 m) |
| Mo-B | 1980 | Wherry | | 18 feet 0 inches (5.49 m) |
| Lifthrasir | 1985 | Double Cable Car Gig | 270 pounds (120 kg) | 22 feet 0 inches (6.71 m) |
| Austin | 1987 | Single Modified Whitehall | 205 pounds (93 kg) | 14 feet 0 inches (4.27 m) |
| Cecco | 1988 | Single Dolphin Club | 219 pounds (99 kg) | 14 feet 0 inches (4.27 m) |
| Joe Bruno | 1989 | Single Dolphin Club | 212 pounds (96 kg) | 14 feet 0 inches (4.27 m) |
| Ring | 2000 | Single Flat-Bottomed Dory | 193 pounds (88 kg) | 15 feet 2 inches (4.62 m) |
| Haake | 2006 | Single Dolphin Club | 218 pounds (99 kg) | 14 feet 0 inches (4.27 m) |
| Kupuna | 2006 | Single Dolphin Club | 167 pounds (76 kg) | 14 feet 0 inches (4.27 m) |
| Kohlenberg | 2006 | Single Cable Car Gig | 189 pounds (86 kg) | 18 feet 1 inch (5.51 m) |
| Commodore | 2016 | Single Dolphin Club | 170 pounds (77 kg) | 14 feet 0 inches (4.27 m) |
| Semper Fi | 2016 | Single Dolphin Club | 165 pounds (75 kg) | 14 feet 0 inches (4.27 m) |

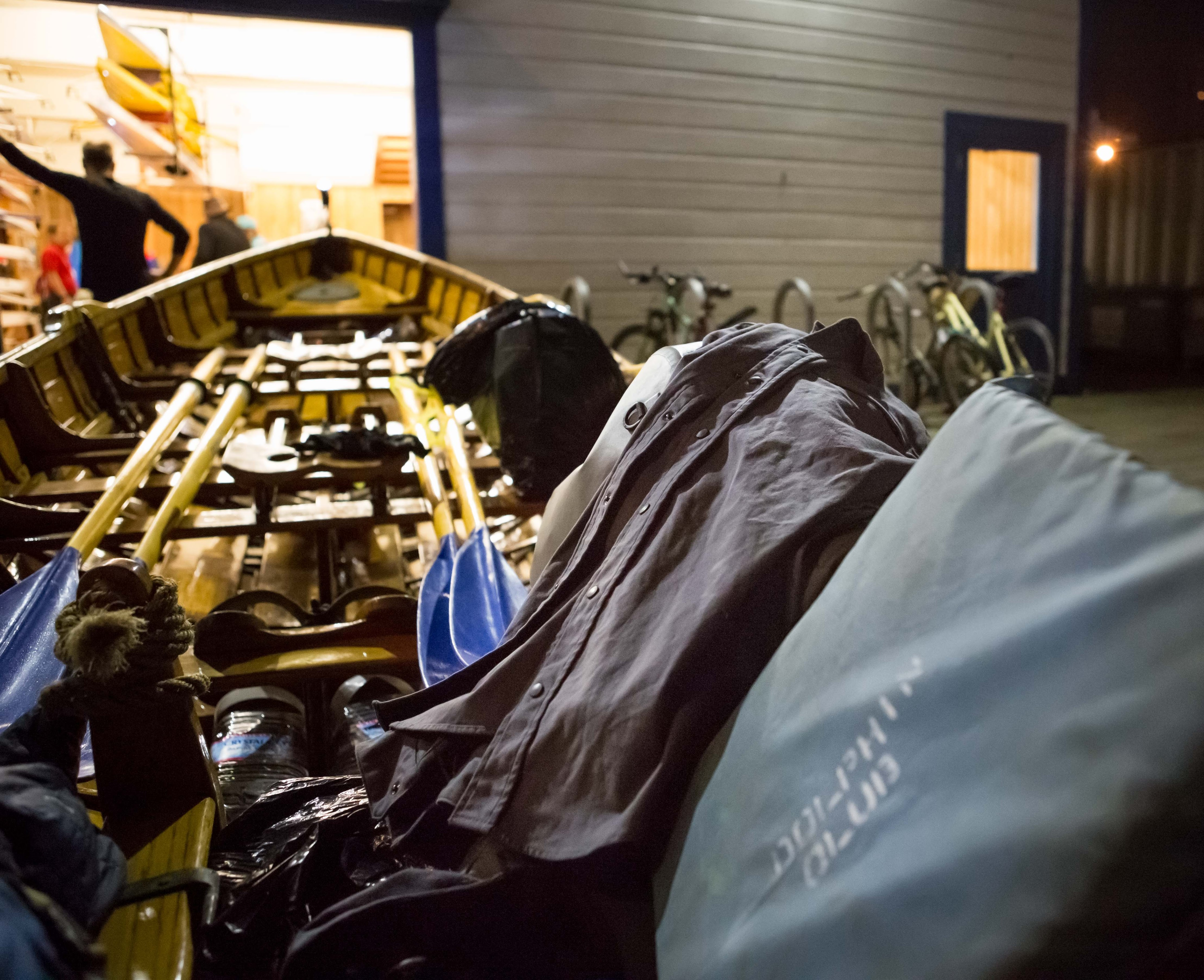
Dolphin Club rowboat with oars and flotation seats

Fiber and carbon rowboats by builder, model, class and material
| Name | Builder | Model | Class | Material |
|---|---|---|---|---|
| El Nino | LiteBoat | LiteRace 1x | Coastal 1x | Carbon Fiber |
| La Nina | LiteBoat | LiteRace 1x | Coastal 1x | Carbon Fiber |
| Tempest | LiteBoat | LiteSport 2x | Coastal 2x | Carbon Fiber |
| Blue Moon | Swift Racing | CO2x | Coastal 2x | Carbon Fiber |
| James Storm | Swift Racing | CO4x+ | Coastal 4x/+ | Carbon Fiber |
| Coot | Maas Boat Company | Maas 24 | Open Water Shell | Fiberglass |
| Flicka | Maas Boat Company | Maas 24 | Open Water Shell | Fiberglass |
| Gull | Maas Boat Company | Maas 24 | Open Water Shell | Fiberglass |
| Surf Scooter | Maas Boat Company | Maas 24 | Open Water Shell | Fiberglass |
| Pelican | Maas Boat Company | Maas Carbon 24 | Open Water Shell | Carbon Fiber |
| Murre | Maas Boat Company | Maas Flyweight | Open Water Shell | Fiberglass |
| Tern | Maas Boat Company | Maas Aero | Open Water Shell | Fiberglass |
| Banana | Maas Boat Company | Maas Aero | Open Water Shell | Fiberglass |
| Osprey | Maas Boat Company | Maas Double | Open Water Shell | Carbon Fiber |
| Troneum | Maas Boat Company | Maas Dragonfly | Open Water Shell | Fiberglass |

== Activities and events ==
Members include local residents and athletes training for swimming the English Channel. According to a video from KQED, many swimmers do not wear wet suits.

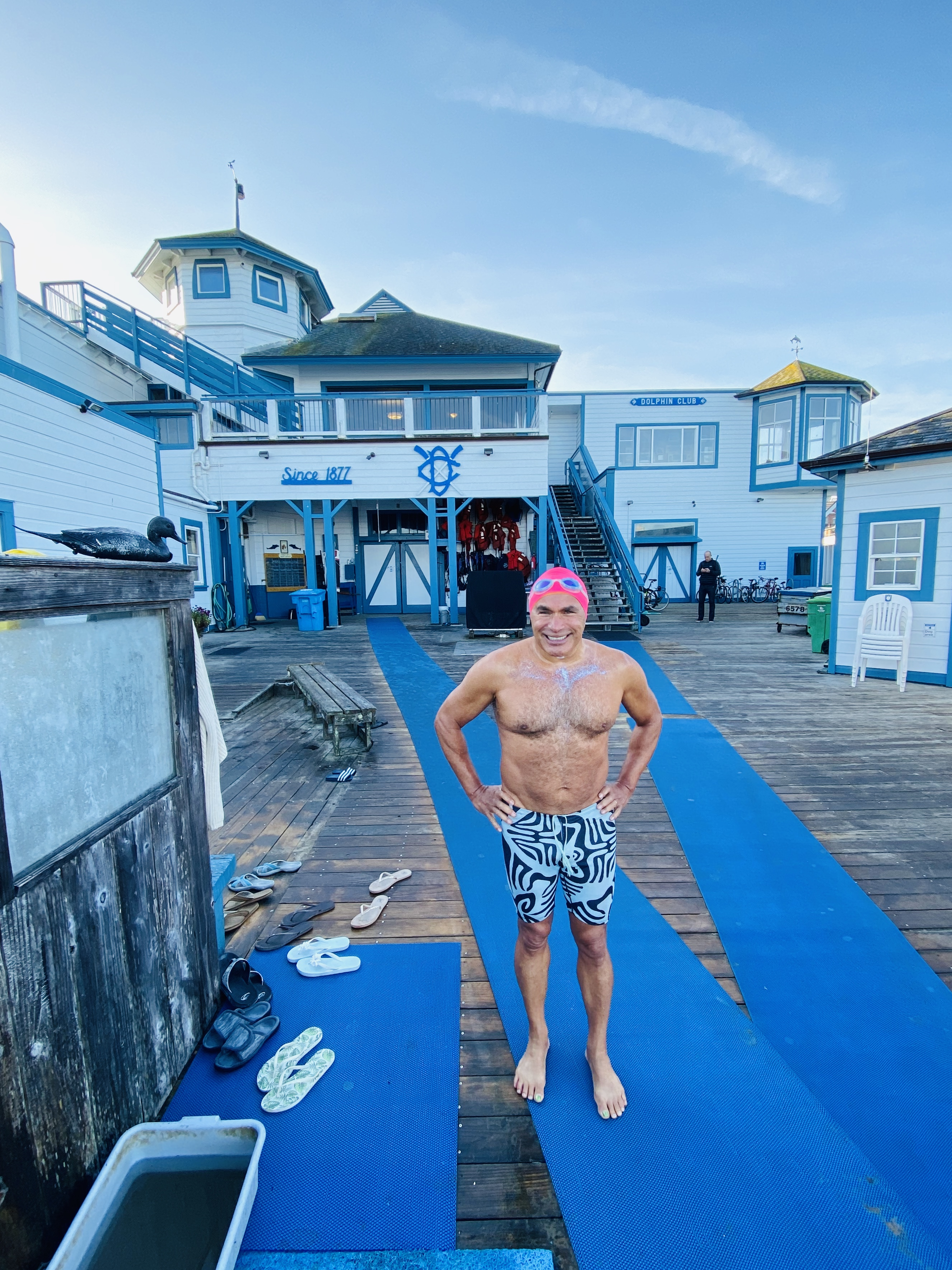
Back deck with club member preparing for swim

The Dolphin Club hosts a polar bear swim challenge where members attempt to swim 40 miles (64 km) in the San Francisco Bay inside Aquatic Park during the winter season.

Since 1956, the Dolphin Club has hosted an annual 100 miles (160 km) row from the club to Sacramento. In 1984, Jon Bielinski started hosting a weekly boat night, where members and guests would socialize and do maintenance and repair on the club's wooden boats.

About twice a month, the Dolphin Club hosts a weekend swim in the San Francisco Bay. Most of the swims leave the Aquatic Park Cove. Swimmers are piloted by club boats for protection. Out-of-cove swims include swimming the length of the Golden Gate Bridge from south to north (approximately 1.2 miles (1.9 km)), swimming from the Bay Bridge to the Dolphin Club (approximately 3 miles (4.8 km)), and the Escape from Alcatraz swims (approximately 1.5 miles (2.4 km)), the last of which has been part of the Escape from Alcatraz triathlons.

== Notable members / alumni ==
- Kim Chambers, open water swimmer
- Walt Stack, founder of the Dolphin South End Runners

== See also ==
- South End Rowing Club, neighboring rowing club in Aquatic Park
- Dolphin South End Runners
