= San Francisco Maritime National Historical Park =

Place in California listed on National Register of Historic Places

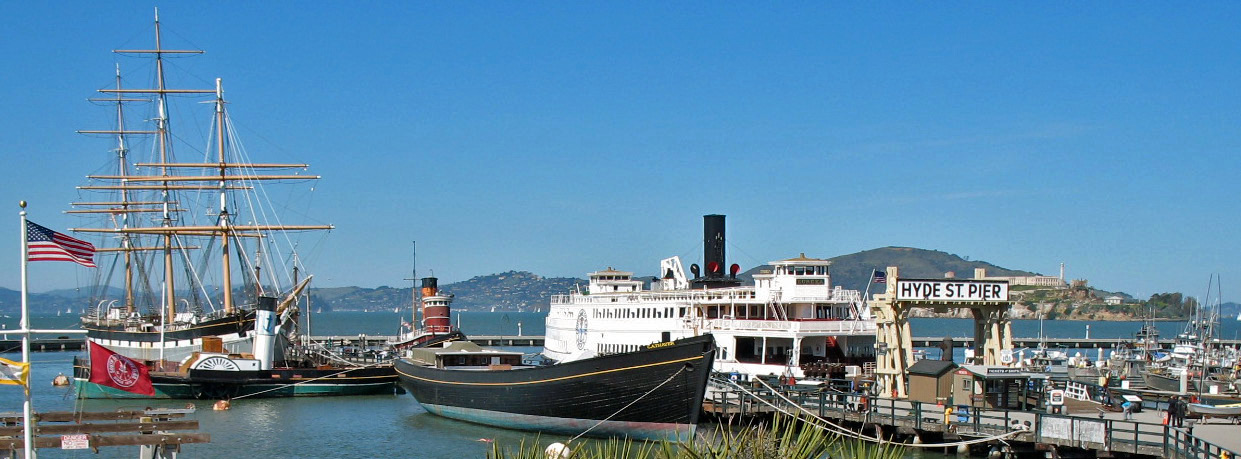
- Historic ships docked at Hyde Street Pier, San Francisco Maritime National Historic Park

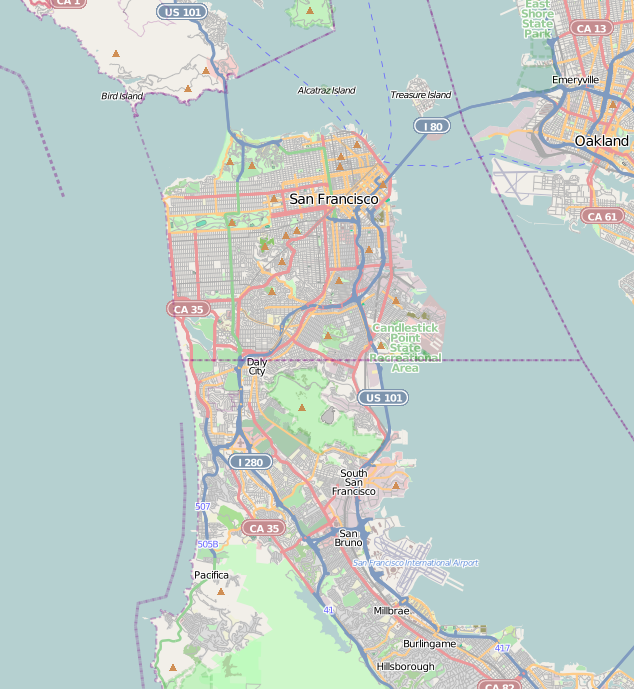
- Location within San Francisco Location within California Location within the United States
- Location: San Francisco, California, United States
- Coordinates: 37°48′23″N 122°25′25″W
- Area: 50 acres (20 ha)
- Established: June 27, 1988
- Visitors: 2,944,483 (in 2025)
- Governing body: National Park Service
- Website: www.nps.gov/safr/index.htm

U.S. National Historic Landmark
- Official name: Aquatic Park Historic District
- Designated: January 26, 1984
- Reference no.: 84001183

U.S. National Register of Historic Places
- Official name: San Francisco Maritime National Historic Site
- Designated: June 27, 1988
- Reference no.: 01000281

The San Francisco Maritime National Historical Park is located in San Francisco, California, United States. The park includes a fleet of historic vessels, a visitor center, a maritime museum, and a library/research facility. Formerly referred to as the San Francisco Maritime Museum, the collections were acquired by the National Park Service in 1978. The San Francisco Maritime National Historical Park was authorized in 1988; the maritime museum is among the park's many cultural resources. The park also incorporates the Aquatic Park Historic District, bounded by Van Ness Avenue, Polk Street, and Hyde Street.

== History ==
Philanthropist Alma de Bretteville Spreckels' last major project was the construction of the San Francisco Maritime Museum. When it opened in 1951, her collection of model ships that had been on display at the 1939–40 Golden Gate International Exposition was the main exhibit. She had had a feud with museum founding director, Karl Kortum, and as a result, did not receive much recognition for her role in the museum's establishment.

== Historic vessel fleet ==
The historic fleet of the San Francisco Maritime National Historical Park is moored at the park's Hyde Street Pier. The fleet consists of the following major vessels:

- Balclutha, an 1886 built square rigged sailing ship.
- C.A. Thayer, an 1895 built schooner.
- Eureka, an 1890 built steam ferryboat.
- Alma, an 1891 built scow schooner.
- Hercules, a 1907 built steam tug.
- Eppleton Hall, a 1914 built paddlewheel tug.
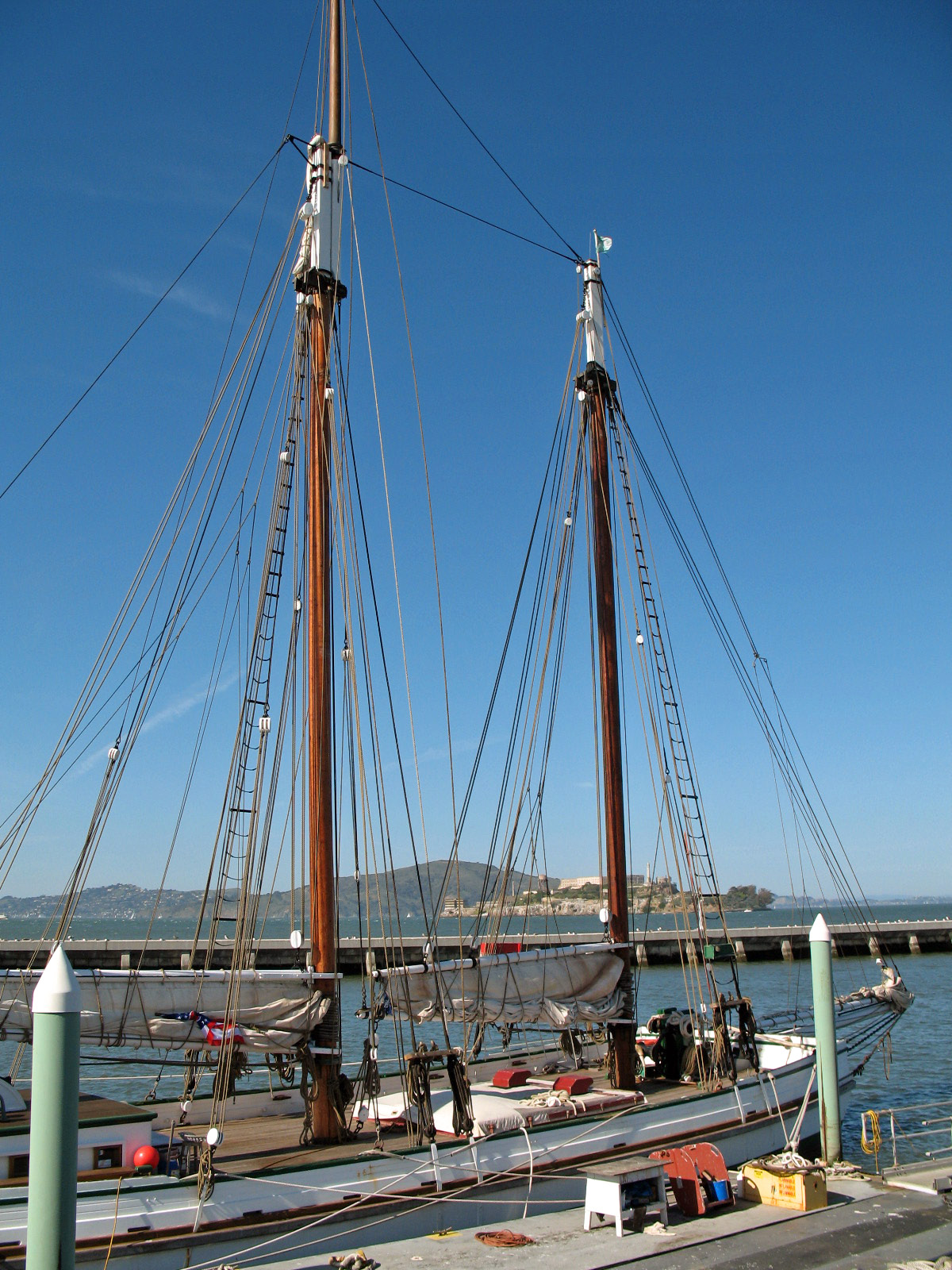
Scow schooner Alma

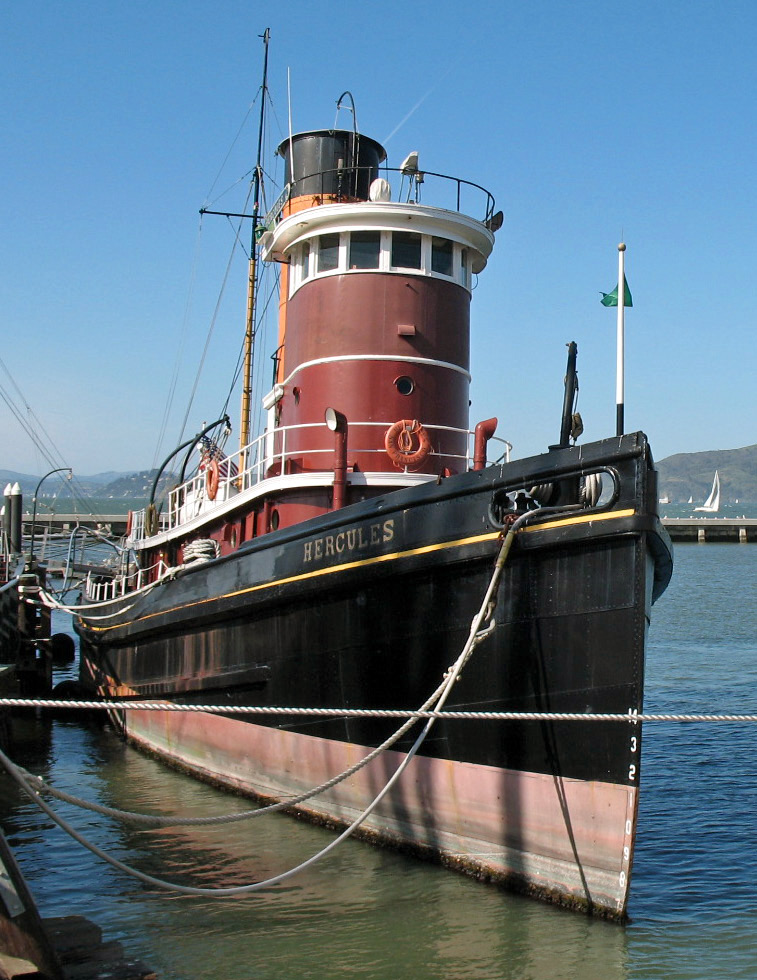
Steam tug Hercules

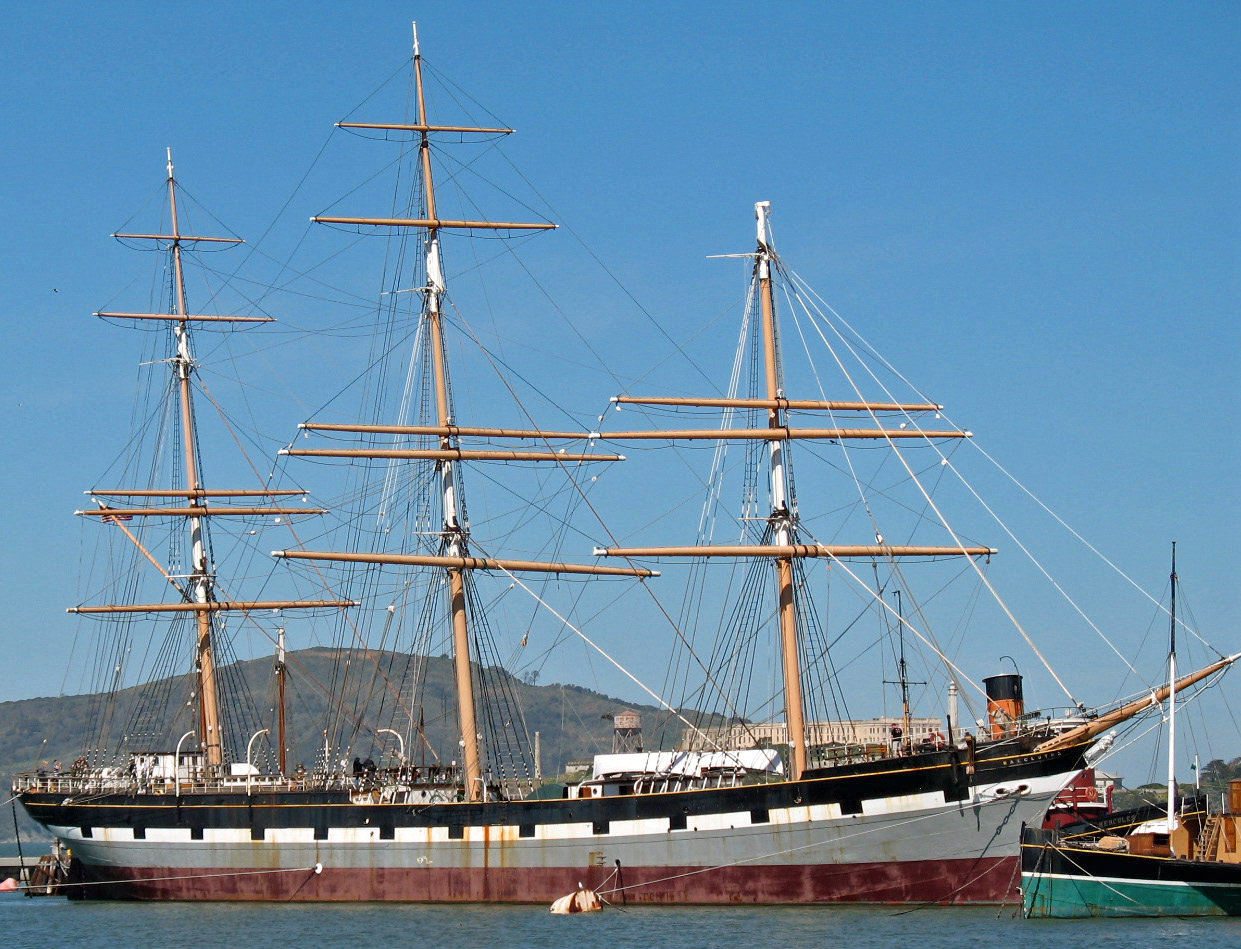
Square rig sailing ship Balclutha

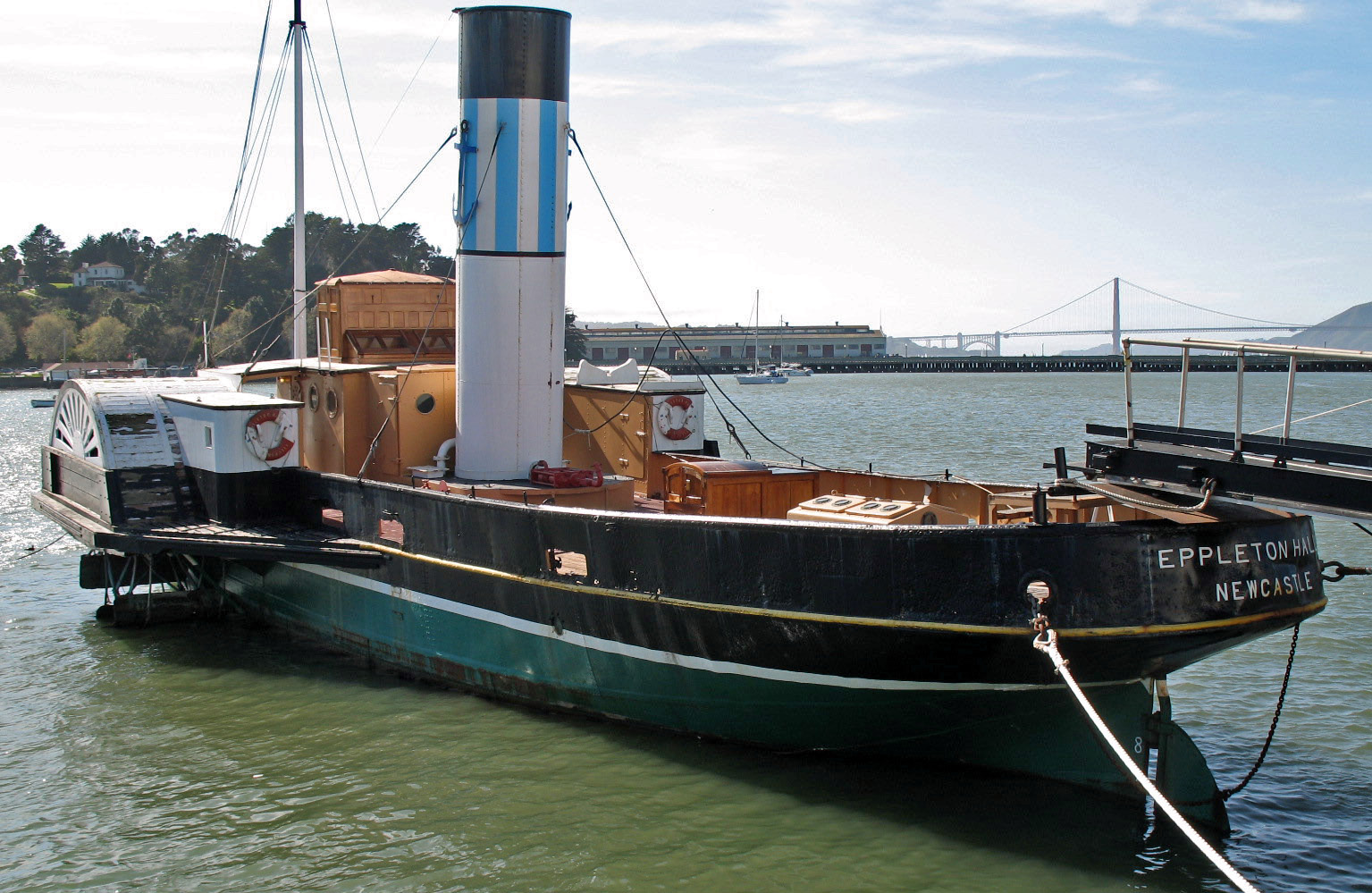
Paddlewheel tug Eppleton Hall

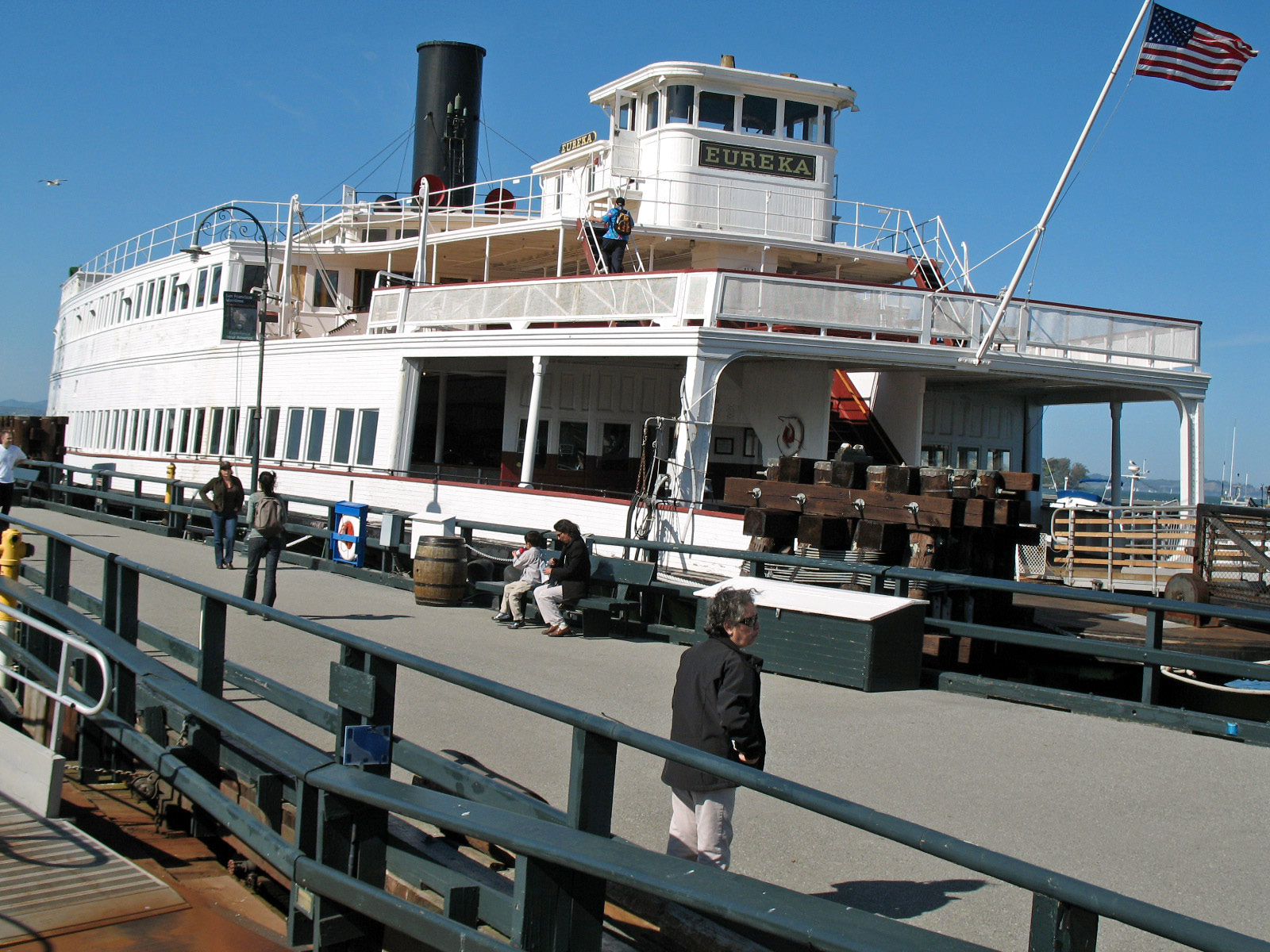
Steam ferryboat Eureka

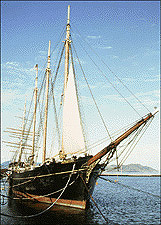
Lumber schooner C.A. Thayer

The fleet also includes over one hundred small craft.

== Visitor center ==
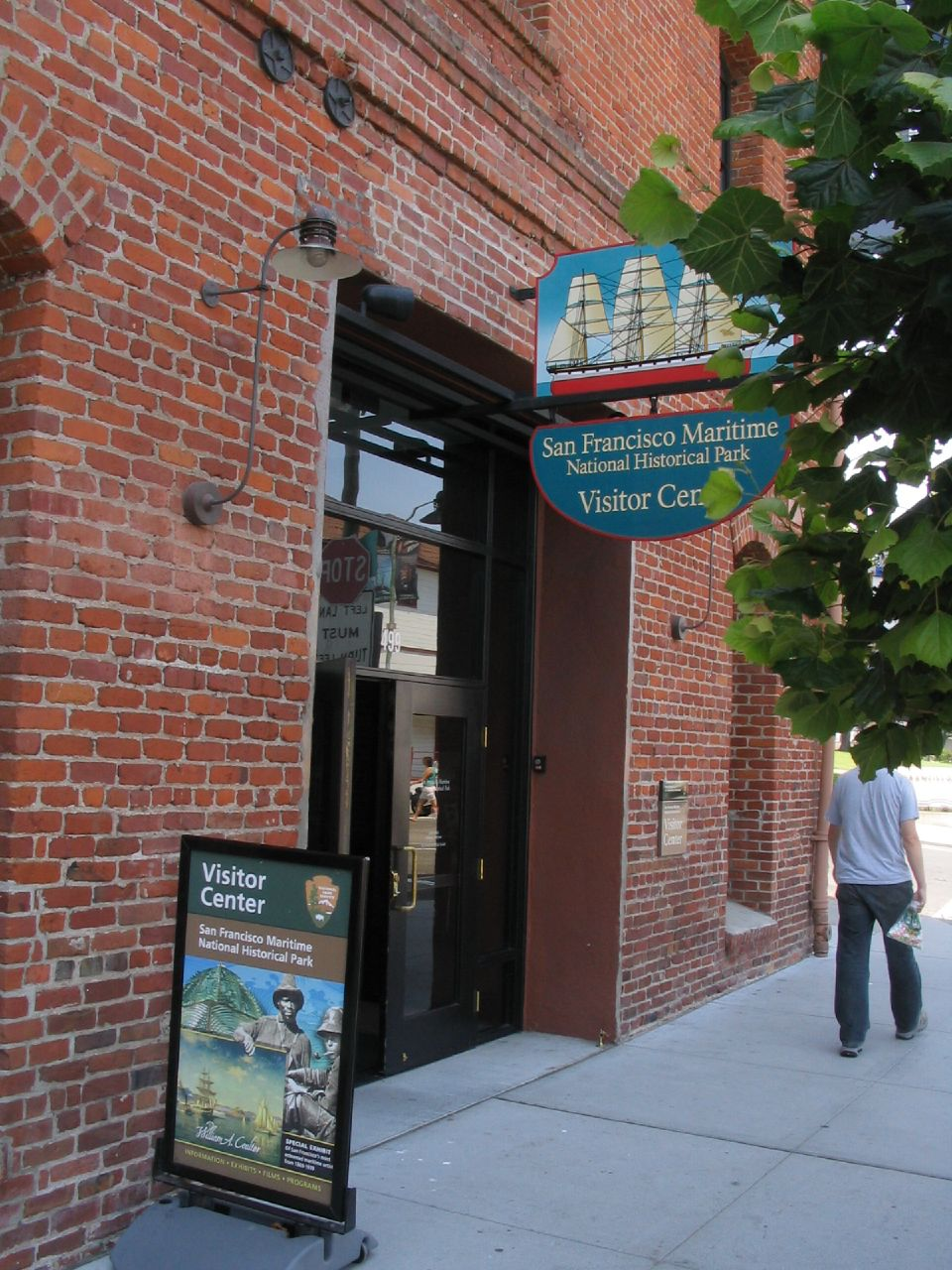
Visitor Center entrance

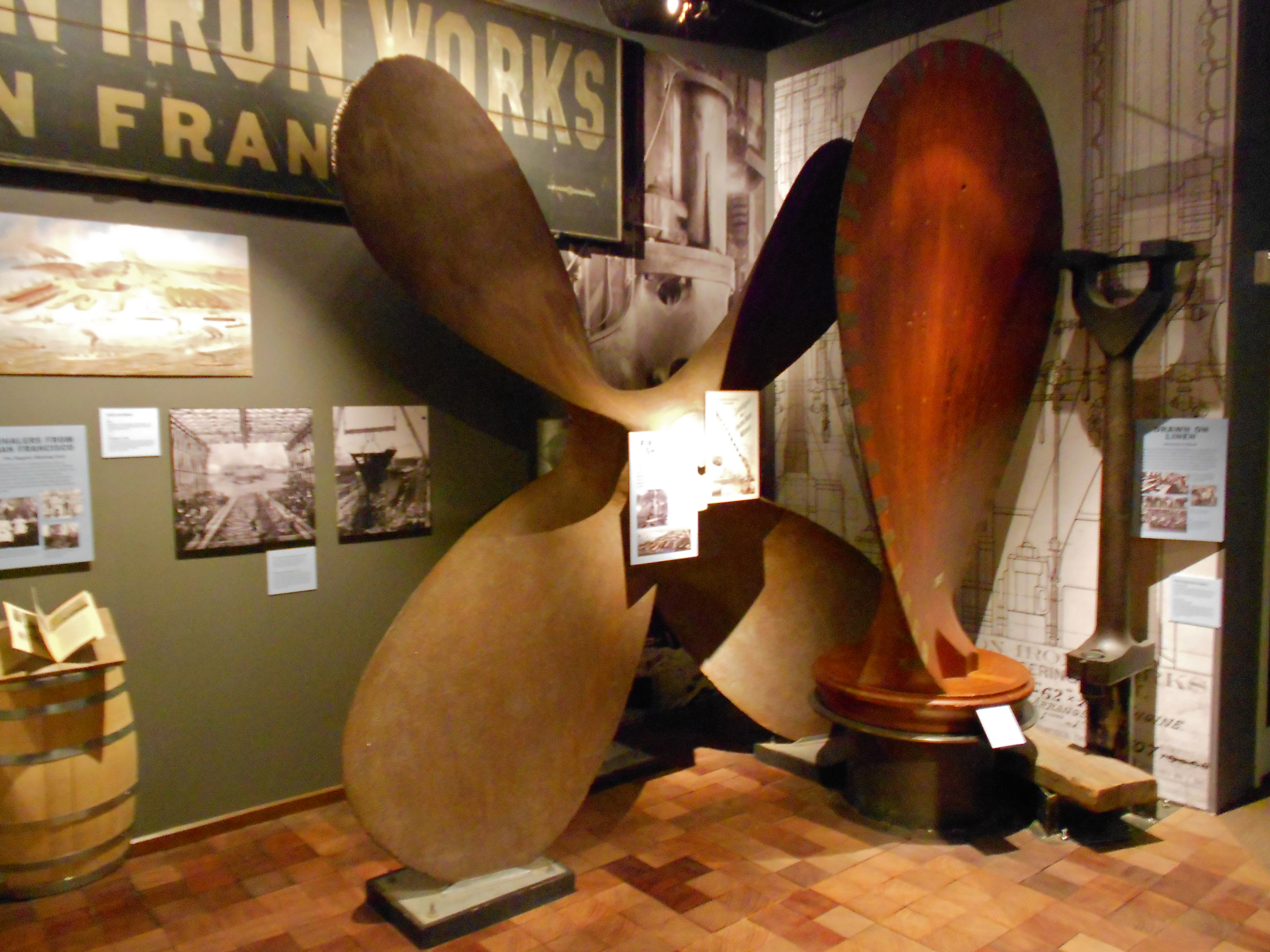
Exhibit in Visitor center

The visitor center is housed in the park's 1909 waterfront warehouse, located at the corner of Hyde and Jefferson streets (499 Jefferson). The City of San Francisco declared the four-story brick structure a historic landmark in 1974, and the building was listed on the National Register of Historic Places in 1975. Inside, exhibits (including a first order Fresnel lighthouse lens and a shipwrecked boat) tell the story of San Francisco's colorful and diverse maritime heritage. The visitor center also contains a theater and an information desk. SFGate described the visitors center as containing ‘museum-quality exhibits’ that show the importance of maritime history for the West Coast.

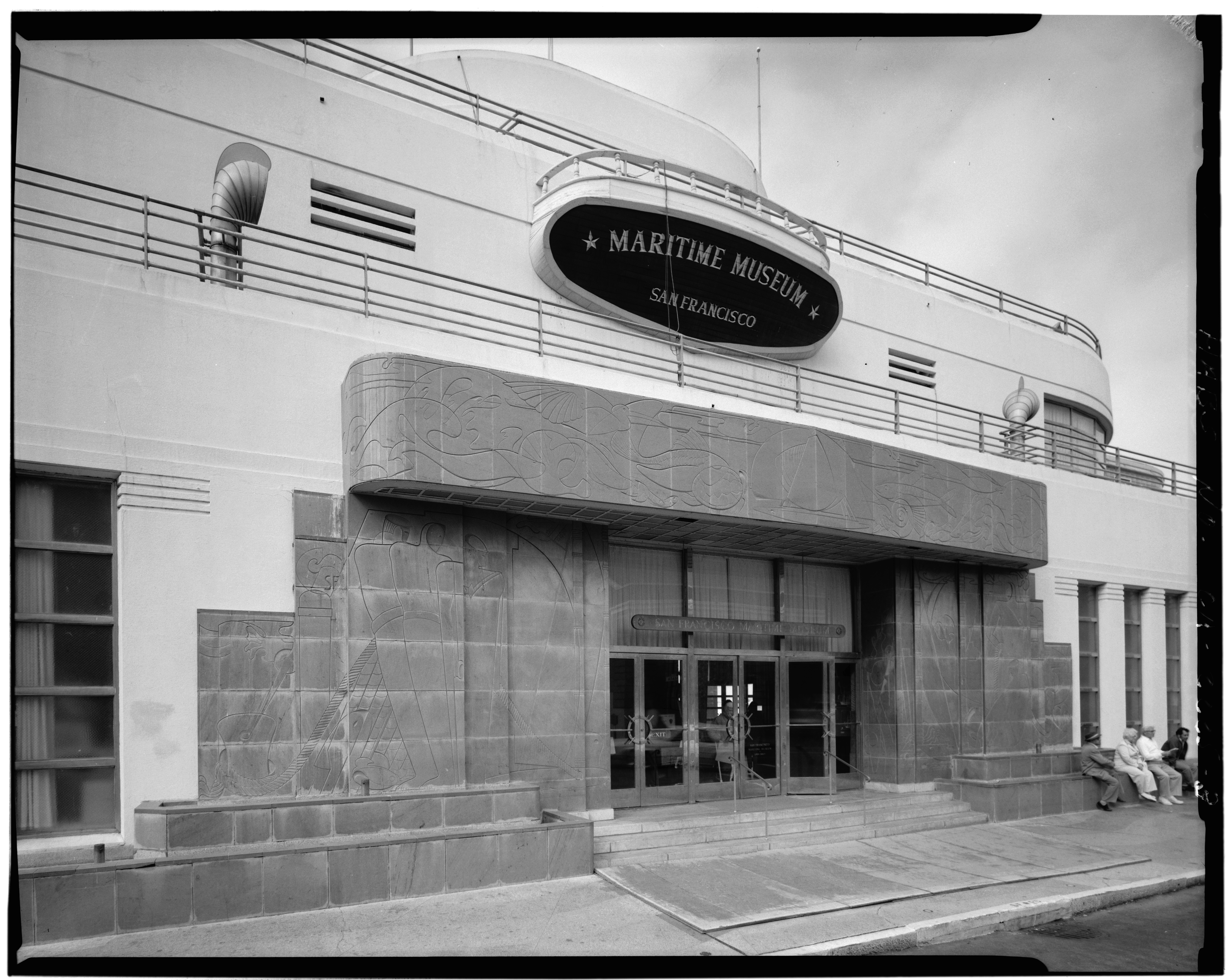
Maritime Museum front entrance

== Maritime Museum ==
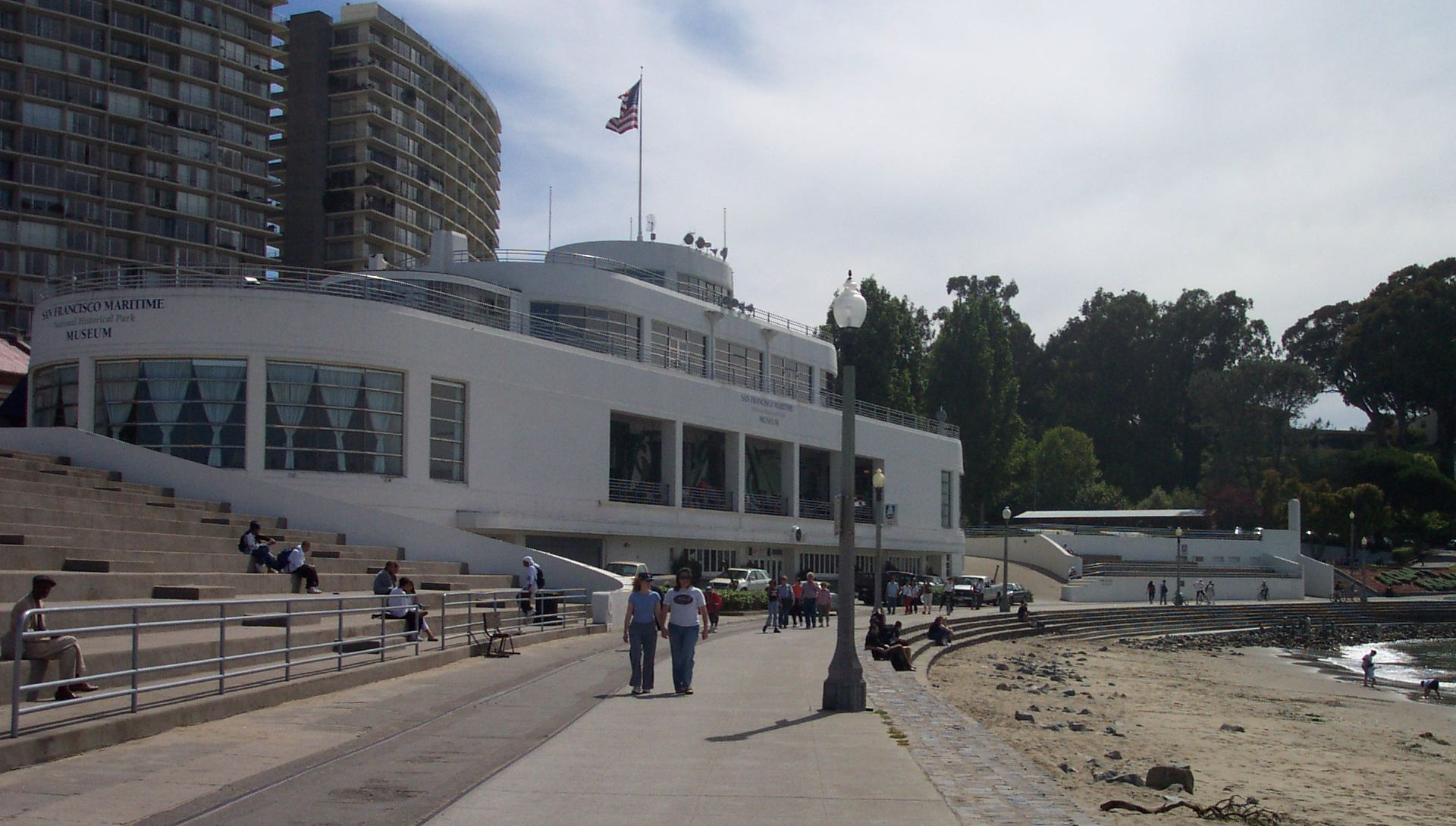
Maritime Museum from Aquatic Park

The maritime museum is housed in a Streamline Moderne (late Art Deco) building in the shape of an ocean liner that is the centerpiece of the Aquatic Park Historic District, a National Historic Landmark at the foot of Polk Street and a minute's walk from the visitor center and Hyde Street Pier. The building was originally completed in 1939 by the WPA as a public bathhouse, and its interior is decorated with fantastic and colorful mosaics and murals, created primarily by artist and color theoretician Hilaire Hiler. Some of the artwork was rediscovered during restoration projects in the 2010s. In 2024, The New York Times listed the museum on its recommendations for what to do in San Francisco in 36 hours. The Aquatic Park Bathhouse building that has housed the museum since 1951 was the focus of a 2025 documentary.

== Maritime Research Center ==
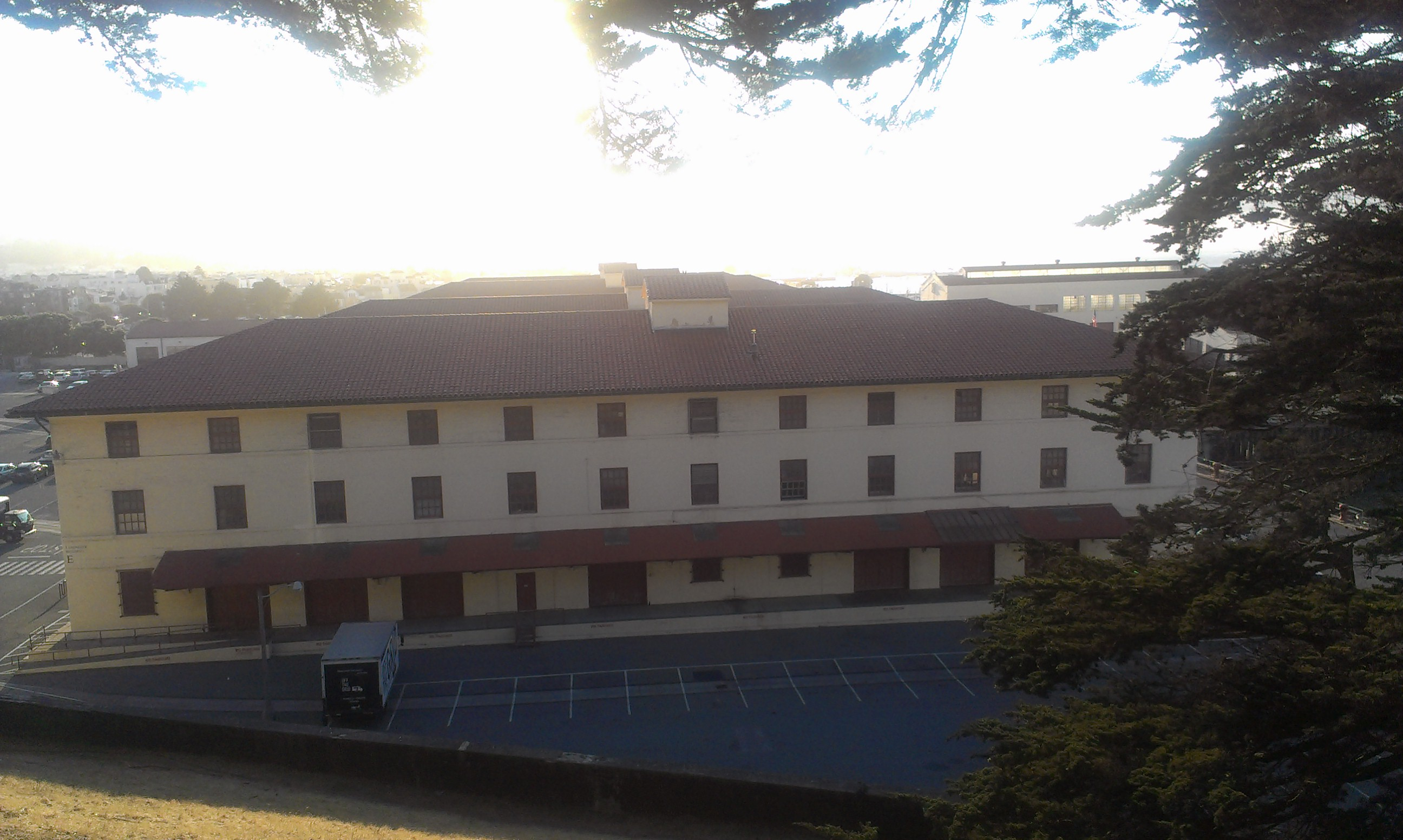
Home of Maritime Research Center (Building E) in Fort Mason Center

According to SFGate, the Maritime Research Center has the largest and best collection of materials on ships and the sea on the Pacific Coast. It is considered a top-4 maritime research center nationally and it also claims to be the largest museum and research collection in the National Park Service.

The Center says it started collecting in 1939 and has previously been known as the J. Porter Shaw Library and informally as the San Francisco Maritime Museum Library. The J. Porter Shaw Library started in 1951 without a name in a closet tucked under a staircase. In 1959, after J. Porter Shaw’s collections were acquired, it became the J. Porter Shaw Library. Many of the acquisitions were made by a friends group, including on topics ranging from World War II to commercial cruises. Its materials date back to 1536, including more than:

- 35,000 published titles comprising over 74,000 items
- 500,000 photographs
- 7,000 archival and manuscript collections
- 150,000 naval architecture and marine engineering drawings
- 3,000 maps and charts dating from 1650
- 150,000 feet of motion picture film and video
- 6,000 historical archaeology artifacts
- 2,500 pieces of folk and fine art
- 40,000 history objects
- 100 small craft
- 50,000 pieces of ephemera (e.g. menus, brochures)
- 600 oral histories and audio recordings (including hundreds of albums of sea chanteys)

The Center houses significant resources on topics such as the history of the Port of San Francisco (including its laborers), the whaling trade in the Bay Area, the types of ships that traversed the Bay and information on the locations of sunken ships. The Center does not have passenger lists.

In 1983, the Center moved to a historic warehouse in Fort Mason Center. The Center became available by appointment-only starting in 2006 due to budget constraints. The Center also has storage facilities in San Francisco and San Leandro.

== Location and access ==
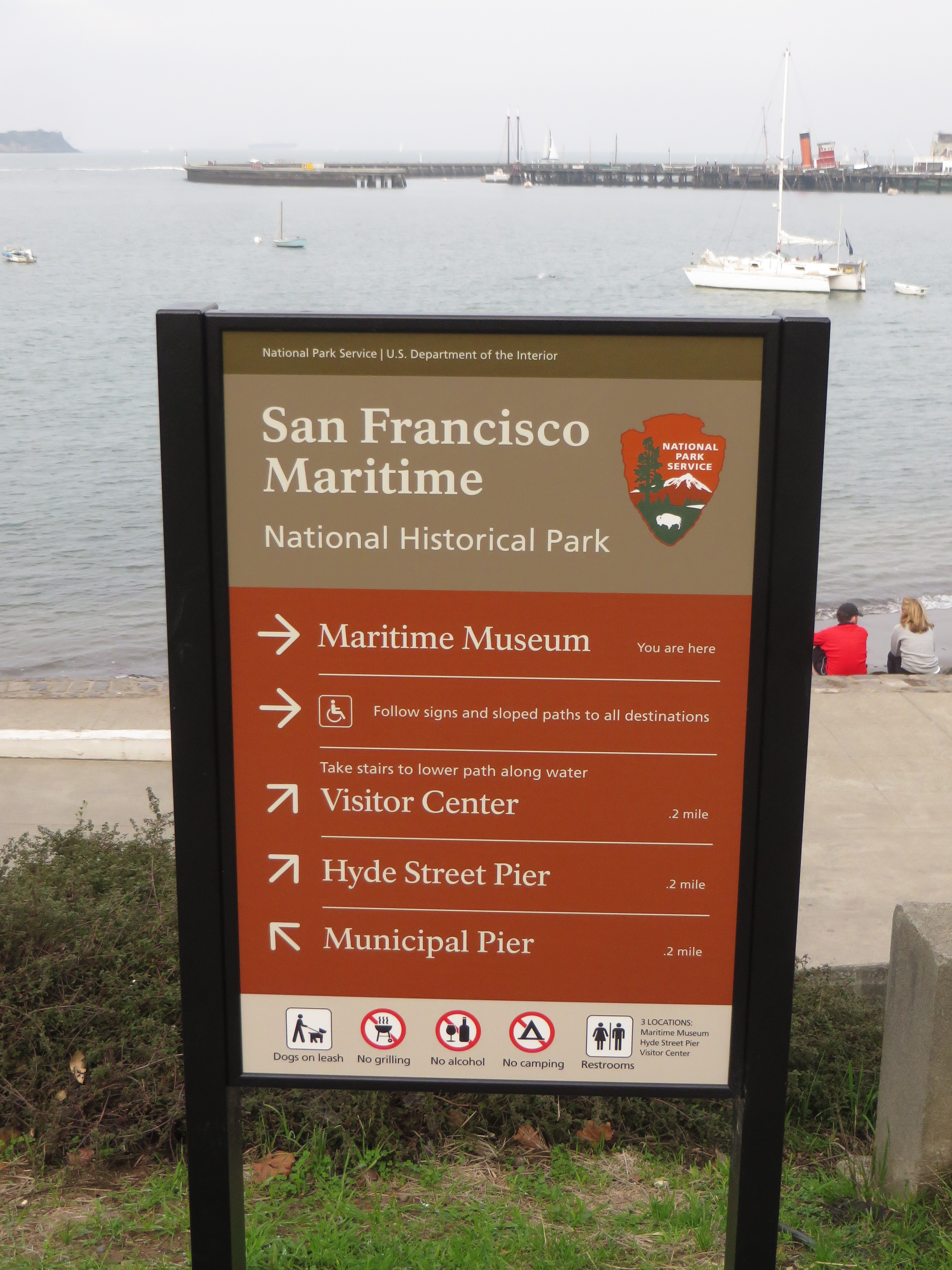
Sign

The visitor center, Hyde Street Pier, and Maritime Museum are all situated adjacent to the foot of Hyde Street and at the western end of the Fisherman's Wharf district. The park headquarters and Maritime Research Center are located in Fort Mason, some 10 minutes walk to the west of the other sites. The Beach and Hyde Street terminal of the San Francisco cable car system adjoins the main site, while the Jones Street terminal of the F Market historic streetcar line is some 5 minutes walk to the east.

=== Open-water swimming ===
Aquatic Park is a popular place for open water swimming, both for recreation and training. The South End Rowing Club and Dolphin Club are located in Aquatic Park.

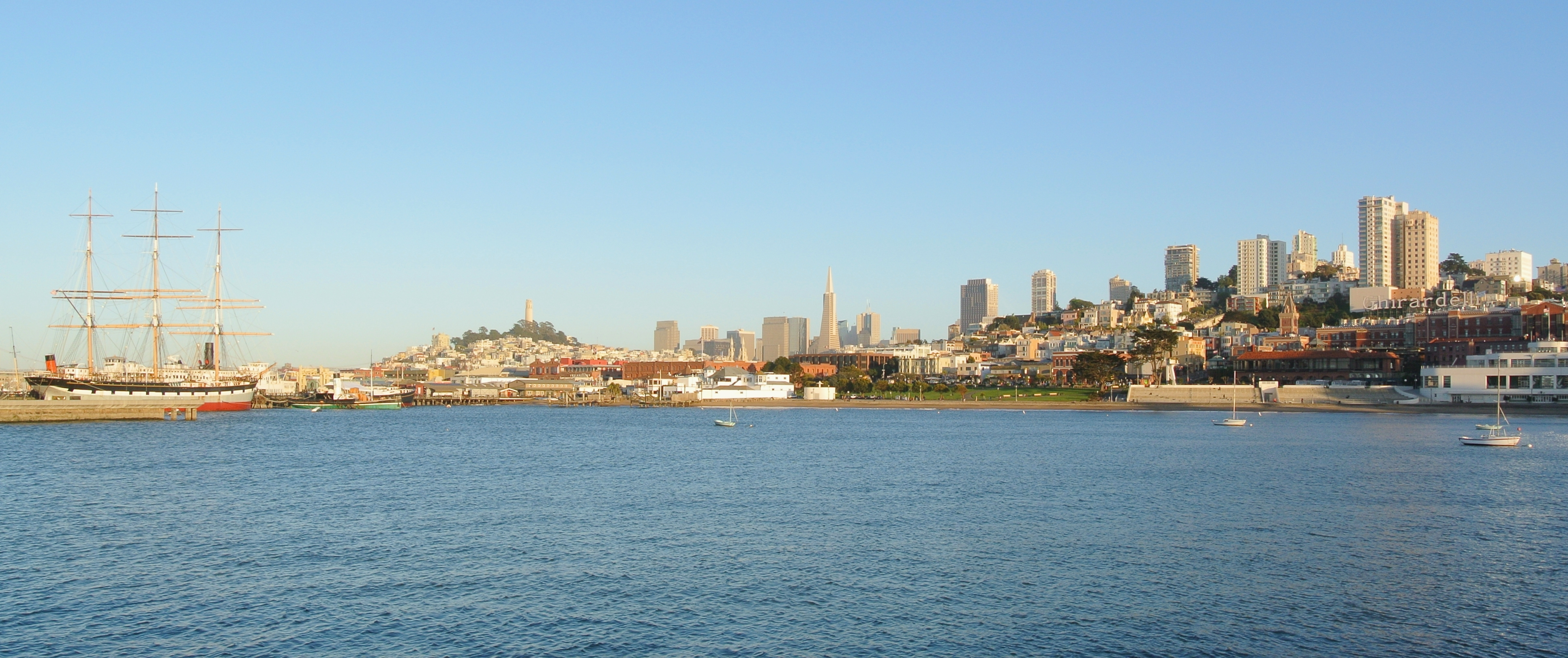
From left to right: San Francisco Maritime National Historical Park, Telegraph Hill and Coit Tower, Fisherman's Wharf, Downtown San Francisco, Russian Hill and Aquatic Park Historic District

== See also ==
- 49-Mile Scenic Drive
- San Francisco Maritime National Park Association, the primary nonprofit partner to the Park

== Bibliography ==
- Bill Pickelhaupt, "San Francisco's Aquatic Park," Charleston, SC, 2005, ISBN 0-7385-3084-0
