= Alma (1891) =

1891-built scow schooner

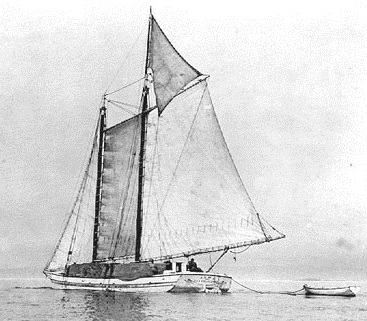
- Alma under sail, c. 1900

History

United States
- Builder: Fred Siemer
- Launched: 1891
- Status: Museum ship

General characteristics
- Tonnage: 41 gross register tons (GRT); 39 net register tons (NRT)
- Length: 80 ft (24 m) LOA; 59 ft (18 m) Reg. Length
- Beam: 22.6 ft (6.9 m)
- Depth of hold: 4 ft (1.2 m)
- Sail plan: Schooner
- Alma (Scow Schooner)
- U.S. National Register of Historic Places
- U.S. National Historic Landmark
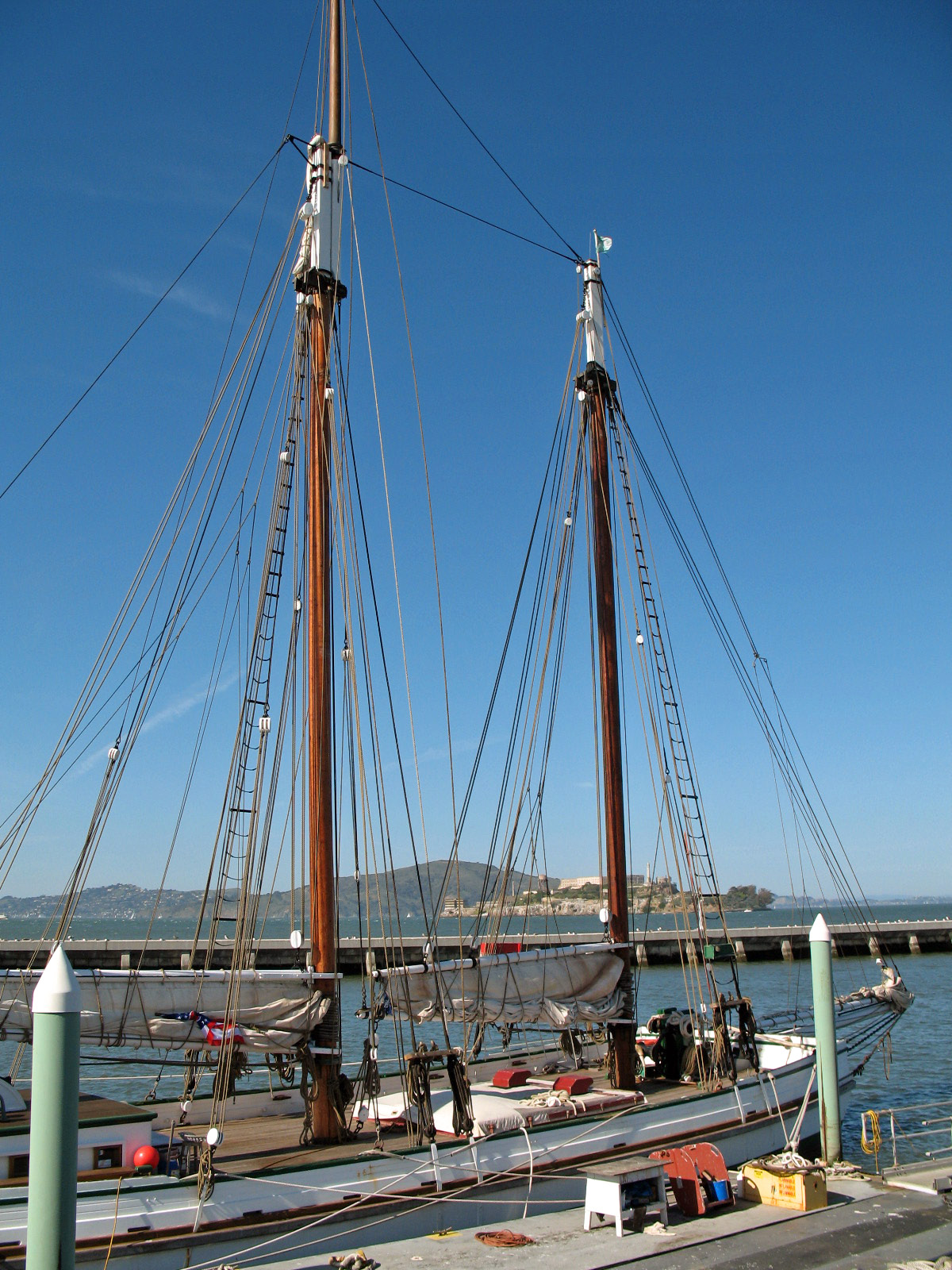
- Starboard view of scow schooner Alma Hyde Street Pier, San Francisco Maritime National Historic Park

- Location within California Location within the United States
- Location: 2905 Hyde St. (Hyde St. Pier), San Francisco, California
- Coordinates: 37°48′37.5″N 122°25′22″W
- Built: 1891
- Architect: Fred Siemer
- NRHP reference No.: 75000179

Significant dates
- Added to NRHP: 10 October 1975
- Designated NHL: 7 June 1988

Alma is an 1891-built scow schooner, which is now preserved as a National Historic Landmark at the San Francisco Maritime National Historical Park in San Francisco, California.

== History ==
Alma is a flat-bottomed scow schooner built in 1891 by Fred Siemer at his boatyard near Shipwright's Cottage at Hunters Point in San Francisco. Like the many other local scow schooners of that time, she was designed to haul goods on and around San Francisco Bay, but now hauls people. Able to navigate the shallow creeks and sloughs of the Sacramento and San Joaquin River Delta, the scows' strong, sturdy hulls could rest safely and securely on the bottom and provided a flat, stable platform for loading and unloading. While principally designed as sailing vessels, scow schooners could also be hauled from the bank or poled in the shallows of the delta.

Until 1918, Alma hauled a variety of cargo under sail, including hay and lumber. Thereafter she was demasted and used as a salt-carrying barge. In 1926 a gasoline engine was installed, and Alma became an dredging oyster schooner, remaining in this trade until 1957.

While built and operated on San Francisco Bay, Alma is in many ways indistinguishable from scows that were launched and sailed on Chesapeake Bay, the Gulf Coast, the Great Lakes, inland rivers, and other coastal waters of the United States. No scow schooners except Alma are known to survive afloat in the United States.

In 1959, Alma was purchased by the State of California and restoration commenced in 1964. She was added to the National Register of Historic Places on 10 October 1975. In 1988, she was designated a National Historic Landmark. She is now one of the exhibits of the San Francisco Maritime National Historical Park and is to be found moored at the park's Hyde Street Pier.

== See also ==
- List of schooners
