= Walt Stack =

American hod carrier and runner

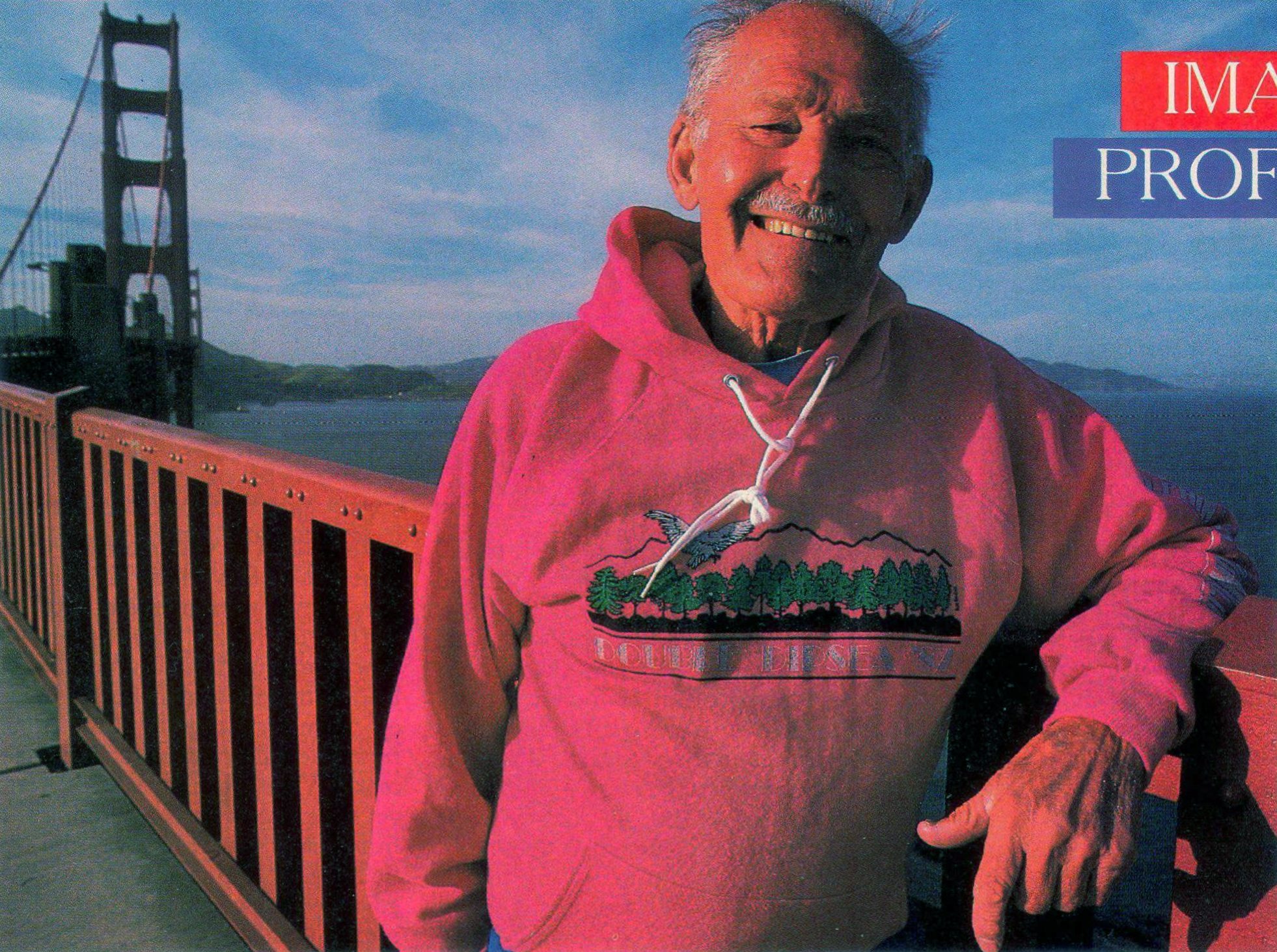
- Stack in 1989
- Born: September 28, 1908
- Died: January 19, 1995 (aged 86)
- Occupations: Hod carrier, amateur runner

Walt Stack (September 28, 1908 – January 19, 1995) was a hod carrier by trade and an icon of the San Francisco, California running community. Stack ran approximately 62,000 miles (100,000 km) in his lifetime. Even in his 70s and 80s, Stack ran many more marathons and 50-mile (80 km) ultramarathons than all but a few of his running peers. Stack was featured in Nike's first "Just Do It" advertisement that debuted on July 1, 1988, when he was still running at 80 years of age.

== Early life ==
Walter stack was born in 1908 and grew up in poverty. As a teenager, he lied about his age to join the US Army. After being discharged in 1926, Stack began sailing from Baltimore, Maryland, and became radicalized. He was a member of the Industrial Workers of the World from 1927-1931.

== Communist Party ==
Stack joined the Communist Party and Marine Workers Industrial Union in the early 1930's. To avoid serving a prison sentence for his actions during a strike, Stack fled from Baltimore to Seattle and arrived at the end of the 1934 West Coast Waterfront Strike. He moved to San Francisco after a beef related to redbaiting and continued going to sea, working as a marine firefighter. When the Communist Party began to abandon dual unionism, he joined the Marine Firemen's Union. Stack was an open communist and a top recruiter for the Communist Party in California. In the 1950's during the Korean War, he was screened by the Coast Guard and was unable to continue sailing. He later found work in construction.

== Dolphin South End Running Club ==
In the 1960s, Stack was a member of San Francisco's Dolphin Club. Circa 1965/1966, Stack invited members of the South End Rowing Club to meet with him and another Dolphin Club member regarding the formation of a running club that would include women and children for the first time. This club would become known as the Dolphin South End Running Club (DSE), San Francisco's oldest running club and among the oldest in the United States.

In his role as club sage, Stack exhorted his flock to "Start slow... and taper off." The message conveyed his sense of enthusiasm for middle and back of the pack fun runners, and the slogan has been emblazoned on all the club's jerseys ever since.

At the DSE races, which have taken place nearly every weekend in and around San Francisco since the 1970s, Walt was usually the master of ceremonies and presenter of ribbons to the top finishers. Stack organized the first Double Dipsea race in 1970, and it is today officially named the "Walt Stack Double Dipsea".

== I'm going to do this 'til I get planted ==
For 27 years, from 1966 until 1993, Stack persisted in covering a set training route. His highly visible training routine made him a San Francisco institution. "I'm going to do this 'til I get planted," Stack decreed. Starting on his bike, he would ride six hilly miles from his Potrero Hill home to Fisherman's Wharf. Once there, he'd strip off his shirt, displaying tattoos of peacocks, wild horses, and bathing beauties across his chest, and then proceed to run a 17-mile (27 km) route over the Golden Gate Bridge to Sausalito and back, after which he would take a one-mile (1.6 km) swim in the currents of the San Francisco Bay near Alcatraz Island.

He trained on the course and competed in the venerable (first run in 1905) and arduous Dipsea race. When the Dipsea was over, Stack would turn around and run the course in reverse, known as the Double Dipsea. It is probably noteworthy that Stack could claim that he was the only actual 'prisoner' of Alcatraz Island to have made a successful swim from Alcatraz to the shores of Fisherman's Wharf — Stack was a prisoner on Alcatraz for a six-month period sentenced to hard labor while a youth for having gone Absent Without Leave (AWOL) in the Philippines. He had in fact swum the distance many times in his later years, as a participant in sanctioned Alcatraz swims which have become quite popular. He often swam year round in those cold Bay waters.

Sports Illustrated once sent a writer to do a story on Stack. The reporter followed him around for a week, getting to know his habits and training routine. The writer, so impressed at how Walt almost invariably ran eight and a half minute miles - regardless of the distance - came to the conclusion that "Walt Stack's pace is so steady, if he fell out of an airplane he probably would fall at the speed of 8.5 minutes per mile."

Stack is the cause célèbre of many fascinating anecdotes during the course of his life and running career. He was long a card-carrying, dues paying member of the Communist Party. In 1981 he participated in the Ironman Triathlon in Hawaii, and he holds the event record for most time taken to finish, in dead last place. Surviving the ocean swim rather effortlessly, Stack commenced the 112-mile (180 km) long bike ride on his single speed granny-basket bike, and finished the 42.195-kilometre (26.219 mi) marathon run early the next morning, but not before stopping in for a full waffle breakfast prior to finishing. Stack finished in the record-breaking time of 26 hours 20 Mins 25 secs. Officials implemented a cut-off time in subsequent years(1983 17 hours).

In the summer of 1977, Richard Thalheimer (of The Sharper Image fame), chose Stack to be the poster boy for the Realtime Watch, which Thalheimer promoted as the first affordable, waterproof, and shock-resistant chronograph that could be reliably used by joggers. Thalheimer took out an ad in Runner's World featuring his friend Walt Stack, and sold thousands of the watches at $69 apiece, earning $1.5 million using Stack's image.

Stack also was an unofficial finisher of the hundred mile long Western States Endurance Run, completing the run in 38 hours and 47 minutes, but not making the cut-off time.
