= South End Rowing Club =

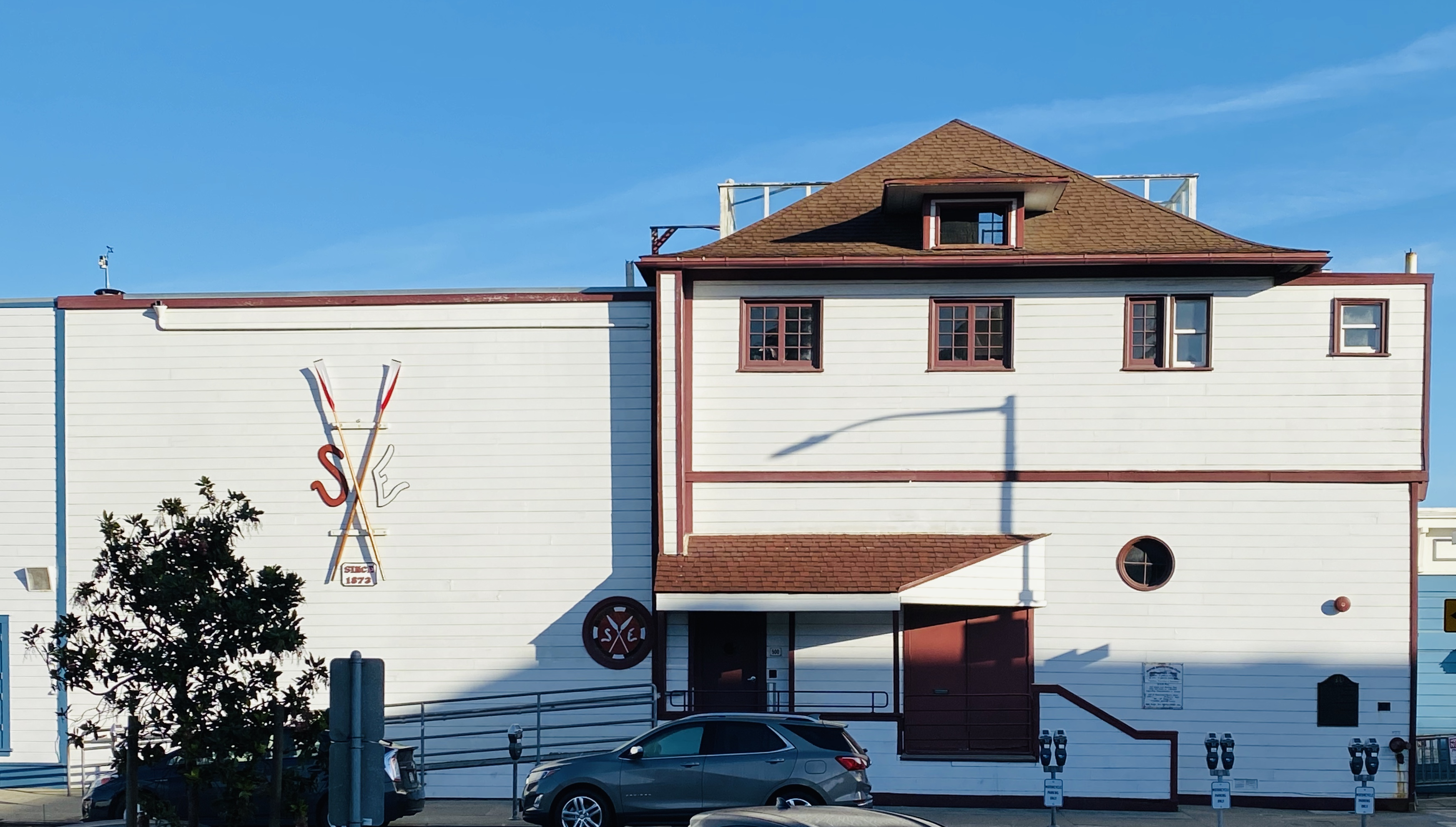

- Location: 500 Jefferson Street, San Francisco, California, US
- Coordinates: 37°48′28″N 122°25′16″W
- Home water: Aquatic Park Cove
- Founded: May 5, 1873; 152 years ago
- Key people: Josh Sale (President)
- Membership: 1,300
- Colors: Red and White
- Website: serc.com
- Acronym: SERC

South End Rowing Club is an athletic club and social club in San Francisco, California.

The South End Rowing Club, founded in 1873, is one of the oldest athletics clubs in the western United States. The boathouse, with a fleet of 30 boats, is located in San Francisco, California, near Fisherman's Wharf, adjacent to the San Francisco Maritime National Historical Park. The club supports participation in rowing, swimming, handball, and running.

== History ==
The original boathouse was located in the South End neighborhood (subsequently torn down), near present-day Oracle Park and Mission Bay. The boathouse was moved by barge to Aquatic Park in the early 1900s, and to its present location in 1938. Portions of the original boathouse remain a part of the club.

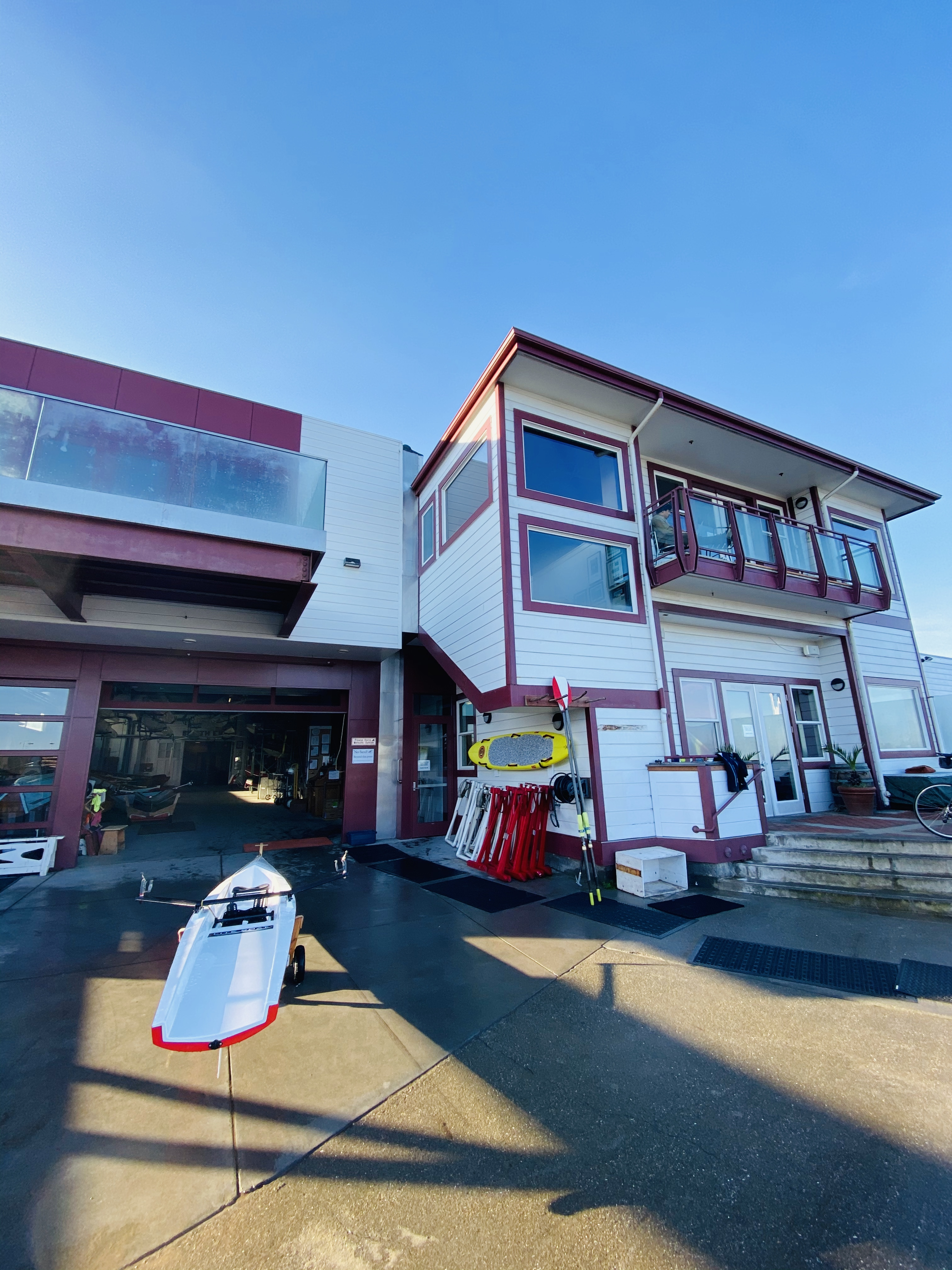
Back deck with rowboat preparing for row

The South End Rowing Club maintains a fierce but friendly rivalry with its next-door neighbor, the Dolphin Club. The clubs hold an annual triathlon in rowing, swimming, and running. As of 2010, the South End Rowing Club has won the competition 29 of the past 31 years. The ladies' crew from the South End races its wooden barge against the ladies' crew from the Dolphin Club.

Every year since 1978 the South End Rowing Club has hosted the Bridge to Bridge Regatta in September. This race is open to the public, and typically includes singles and doubles, and plastic and wooden boats alike. The race courses vary from year to year, but there is typically a 10.5-nautical-mile (19.4 km) "long course" which starts at Aquatic Park and circumnavigates the south tower of the Golden Gate Bridge and the westernmost tower San Francisco–Oakland Bay Bridge, as well as a "short course" from Aquatic Park around the Bay Bridge tower and back.

The South End also hosts a yearly competitive swim from Alcatraz Island in San Francisco bay to the Aquatic Park, which is open to the public. The event is limited to 600 swimmers and reaches its capacity for registration months in advance.

== See also ==
- Dolphin South End Runners
  - Walt Stack, founder Dolphin South End Runners
- Dolphin Club (San Francisco), neighboring rowing club
- Irish Hill (San Francisco)
