= Dolphin South End Runners =

Running club in San Francisco, USA

The Dolphin South End Runners (DSE) is the oldest and largest running club in San Francisco, founded in 1966, by the legendary and infamous Walt Stack who was also its first president. DSE holds organized races nearly every weekend in and around San Francisco. These races are low key and open to runners and walkers of all ages and abilities.

The DSE has been named BEST Running Club in the 2009 Mind & Body contest on the BayList on SFGate.com.
