= Aquatic Park Historic District =

Historic district in California, United States

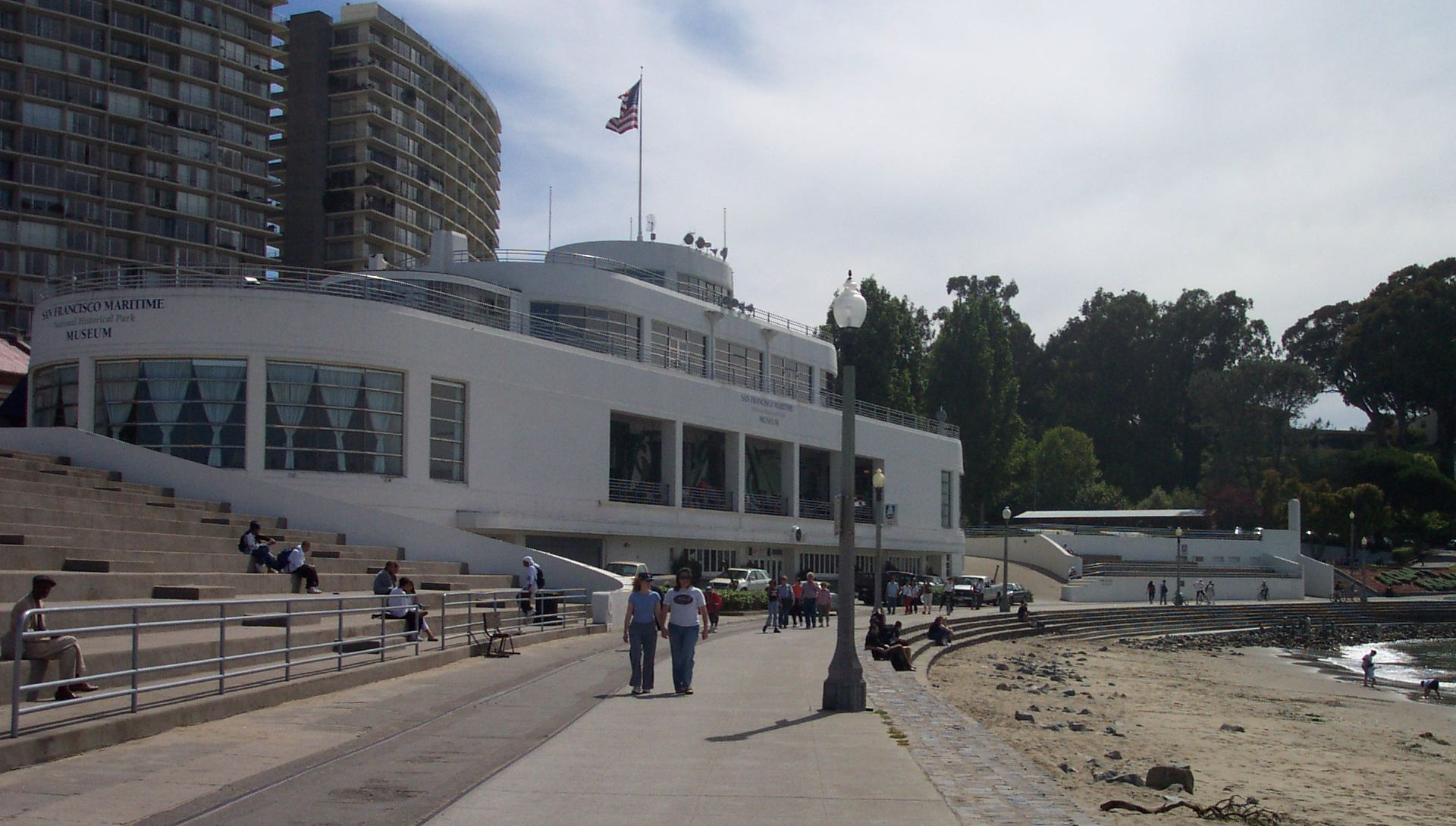
- San Francisco Maritime Museum

- Location within San Francisco County
- 37.8063°N 122.424°W
- Location: San Francisco, California

Site notes
- Architect: Works Progress Administration
- Architectural style: Streamline Moderne
- Governing body: National Park Service

U.S. National Register of Historic Places
- Designated: January 26, 1984
- Reference no.: 84001183

U.S. National Historic Landmark District
- Designated: May 28, 1987

California Historical Landmark
- Official name: Entrance of the San Carlos into San Francisco Bay
- Designated: 1936
- Reference no.: 236

Aquatic Park Historic District is a National Historic Landmark and building complex on the San Francisco Bay waterfront within San Francisco Maritime National Historical Park.

The district includes a beach, bathhouse, municipal pier, restrooms, concessions stand, stadia, and two speaker towers.

== Background ==
The District's San Francisco Maritime Museum building was built as a bathhouse in 1936 by the WPA; in streamline moderne style, its interior is decorated with fantastic, colorful murals. The Steamship Room illustrates the evolution of maritime technology from wind to steam, and there are displays of lithographic stones, scrimshaw, and whaling guns and photo-murals of San Francisco's early waterfront. A visitors gallery hosts such exhibitions as Sparks (2005), which showcased shipboard radio, radiotelephone, and radio-teletype equipment from over the years.

In front of the Maritime Museum is a man-made lagoon on the site of the former Black Point Cove. Black Point Cove was named for Black Point, which is a headland just above the cove, in Fort Mason. To the west is the horseshoe-shaped Municipal Pier. The lagoon is fronted by a sandy beach and a stepped concrete seawall. To the south is a grassy area known as Victorian Park, which contains the Hyde Street cable car turnaround. Hyde Street Pier, though part of the San Francisco Maritime National Historical Park, is not part of Aquatic Park Historic District.

The Historic District was declared a National Historic Landmark in 1987, and added to the National Register of Historic Places on January 26, 1984.

The park is at the foot of Polk Street and a minute's walk from the visitor center and Hyde Street Pier. Its beach is one of the cleanest in the state.

In the park near the corner of Beach and Larkin streets is California Historical Landmark marker No. 236, honoring the Spanish packet ship San Carlos, which on August 5, 1775, was the first known European ship to enter San Francisco Bay.

== Gallery ==
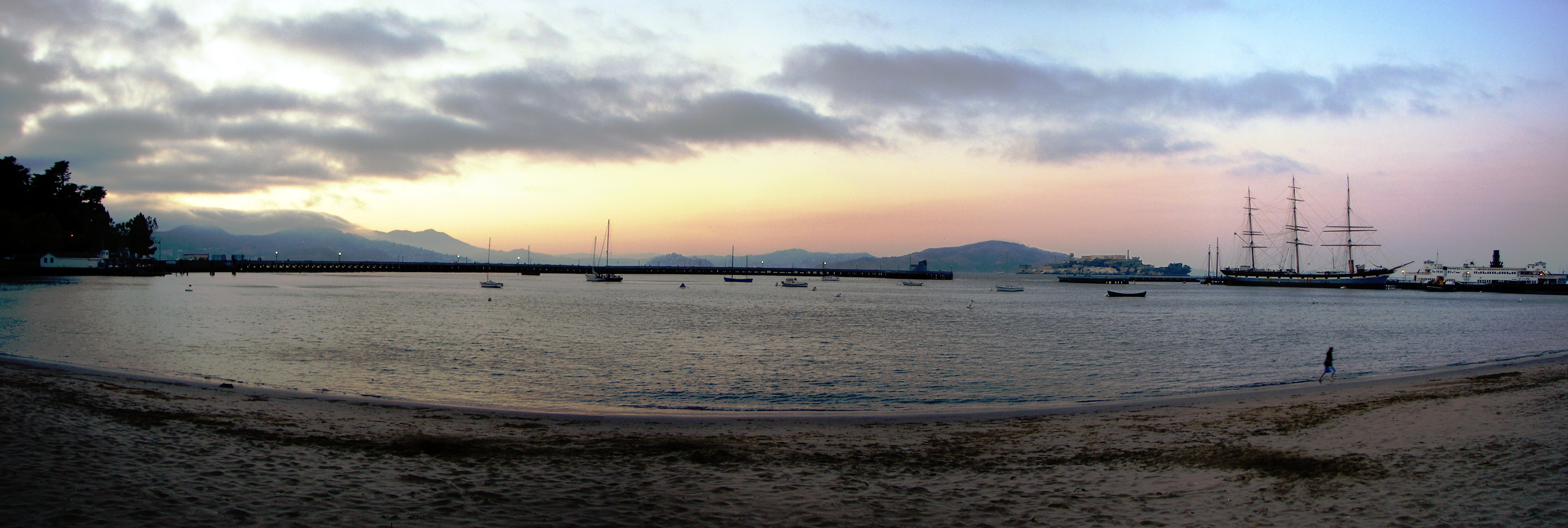
View of the lagoon at sunset

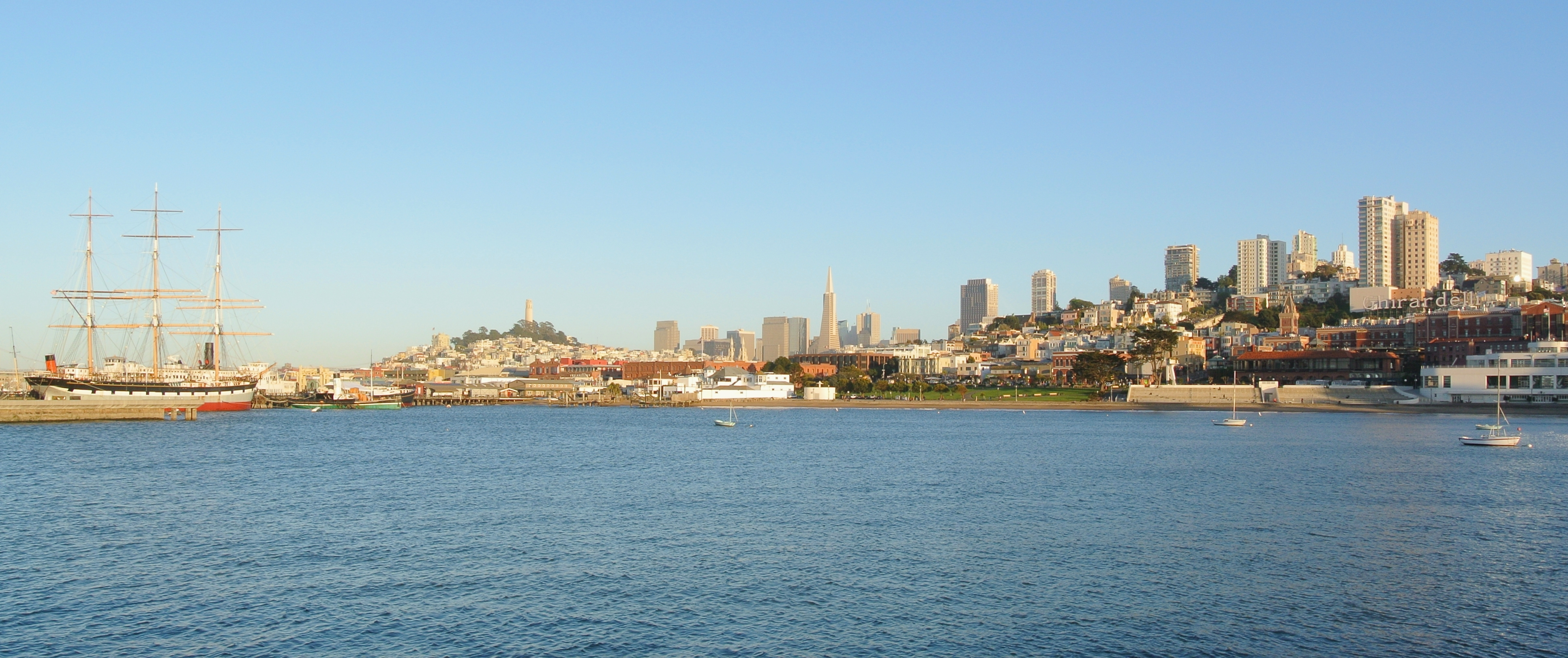
From left to right: San Francisco Maritime National Historical Park, Telegraph Hill and Coit Tower, Fisherman's Wharf, Downtown San Francisco, Russian Hill and Aquatic Park Historic District

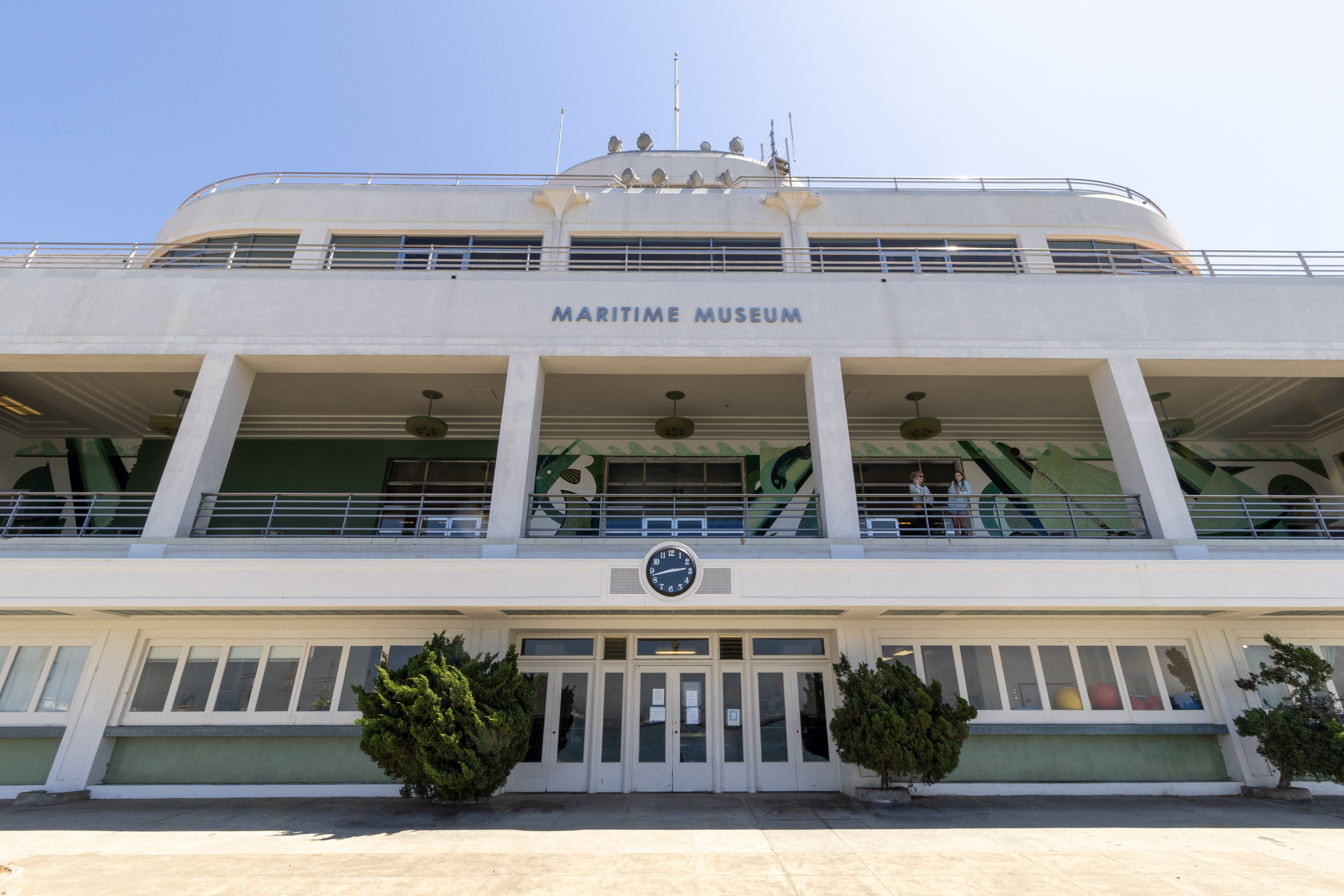
Front of the Maritime Museum

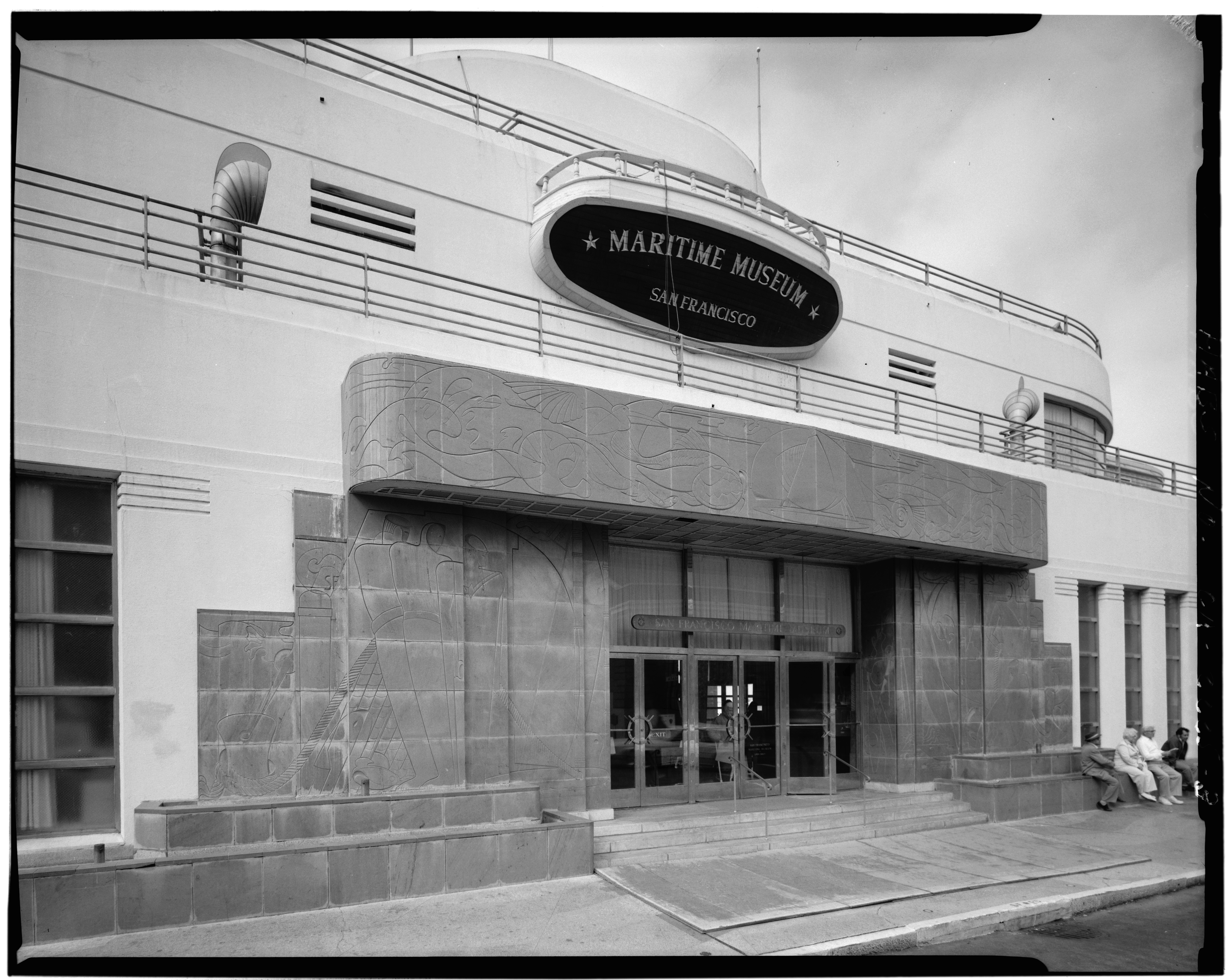
Aquatic Park Bathhouse

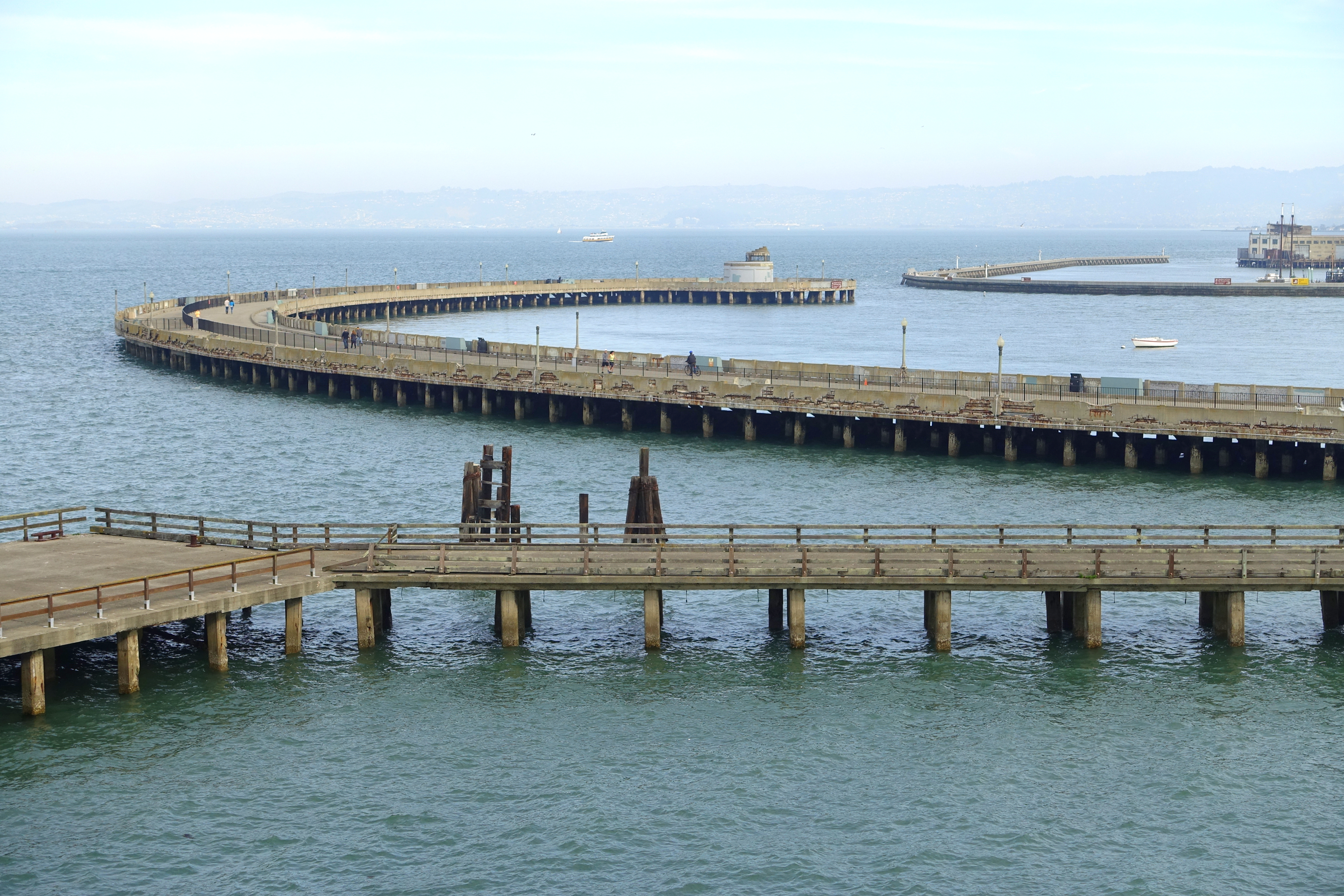
Municipal Pier

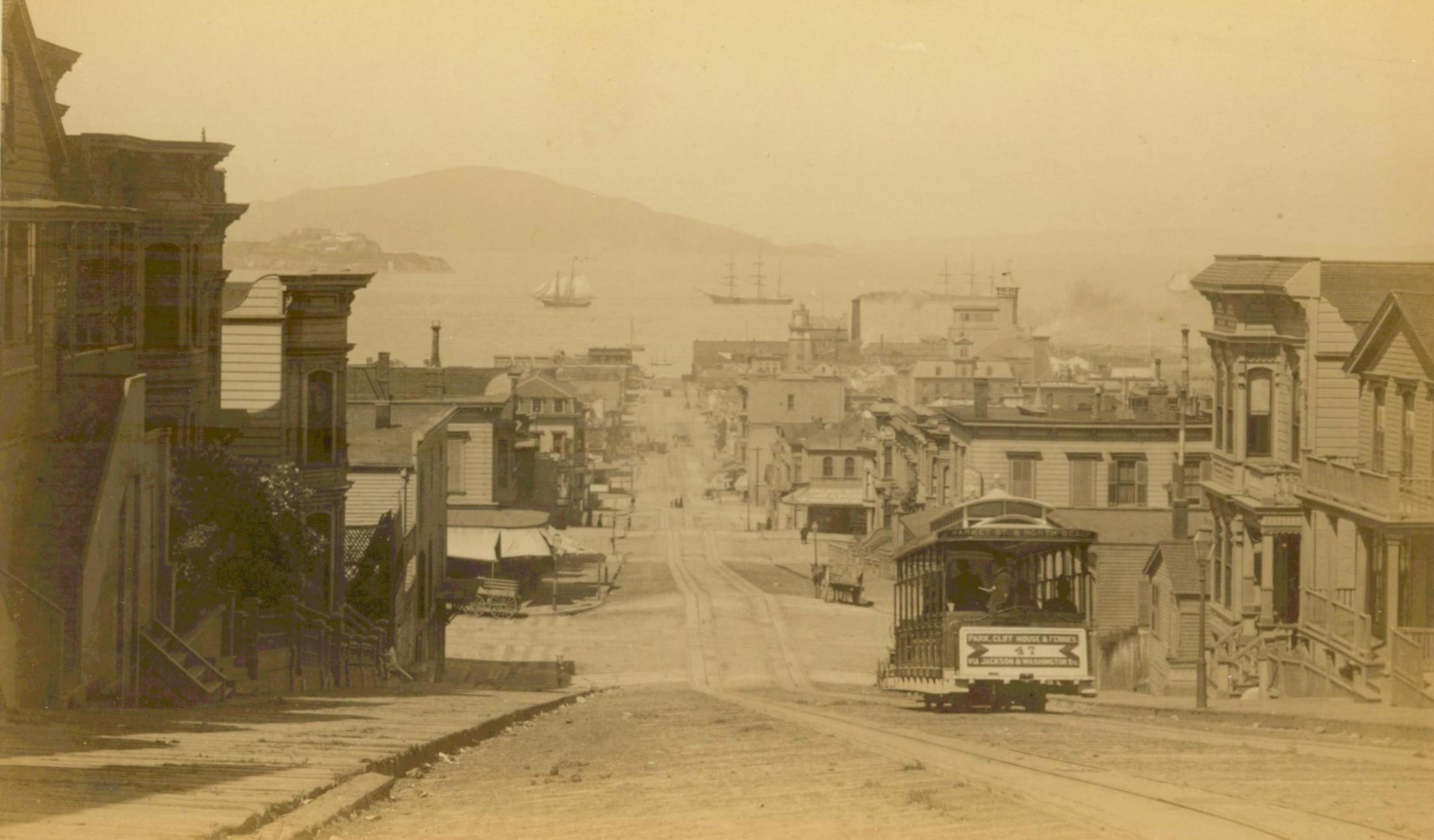
Black Point circa 1888

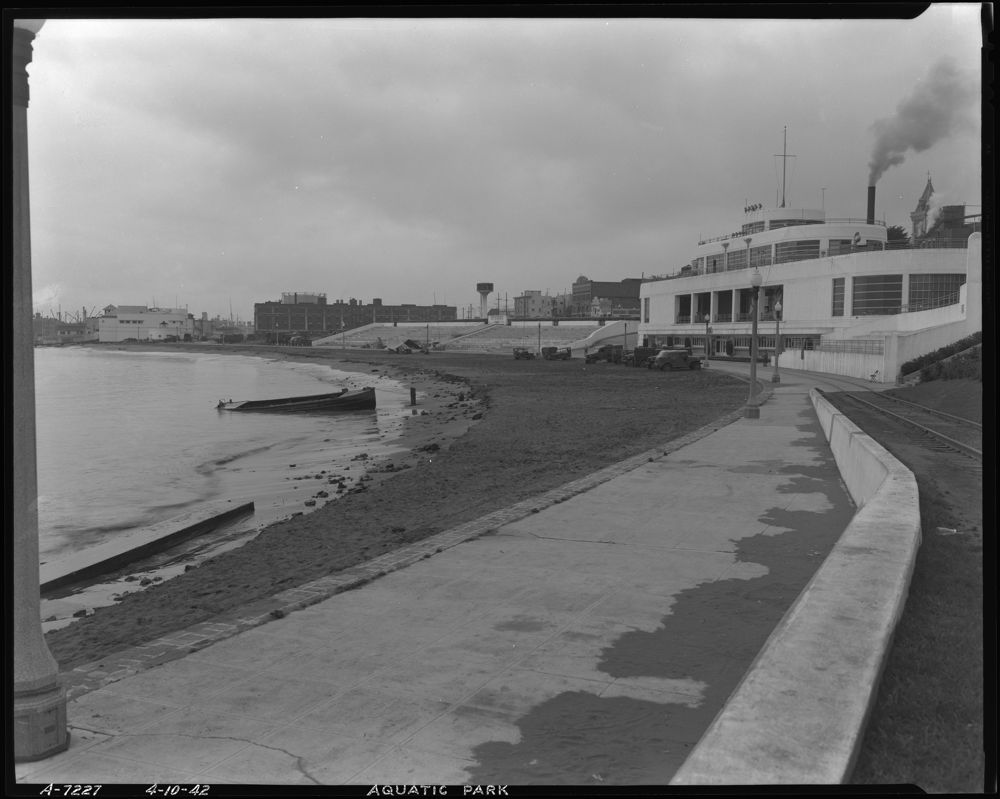
Aquatic Park in 1942

== See also ==
- South End Rowing Club
- List of beaches in California
- List of California state parks
