= 1969–70 Football League =

71st season of the Football League

The Football League
- Season: 1969–70
- Champions: Everton
- Relegated: Bradford Park Avenue

The 1969–70 season was the 71st completed season of The Football League.

Everton won their seventh league title, finishing nine points clear of Leeds United with Chelsea in third and newly promoted Derby County in fourth. Sheffield Wednesday and Sunderland were both relegated.

In the Second Division Huddersfield Town claimed the divisional title and were promoted along with runners-up Blackpool. Aston Villa endured the worst season in their history and were relegated to the Third Division for the first time, along with bottom club Preston North End, for whom it was also a first relegation to the third tier.

In the Third Division Orient won the title and were promoted along with Luton Town, who had finished third the previous season. As usual four teams were relegated, with Bournemouth & Boscombe Athletic, Southport, Barrow and Stockport County all making the drop.

In the Fourth Division Chesterfield won the title and were promoted along with Wrexham, Swansea City and Port Vale. Bradford Park Avenue lost their application for re-election and were replaced by Cambridge United.

== Final league tables and results ==
Beginning with the season 1894–95, clubs finishing level on points were separated according to goal average (goals scored divided by goals conceded), or more properly put, goal ratio. In case one or more teams had the same goal difference, this system favoured those teams who had scored fewer goals. The goal average system was eventually scrapped beginning with the 1976–77 season.

Since the Fourth Division was established in the 1958–59 season, the bottom four teams of that division have been required to apply for re-election.

== First Division ==
First Division
- Season: 1969–70
- Champions: Everton; 7th English title
- Relegated: Sunderland; Sheffield Wednesday
- European Cup: Everton
- Cup Winners' Cup: Chelsea; Manchester City
- Inter-Cities Fairs Cup: Leeds United; Liverpool; Coventry City; Newcastle United; Arsenal
- Watney Cup: Derby County; Manchester United
- Matches: 462
- Goals: 1,212 (2.62 per match)
- Top goalscorer: Jeff Astle (25 goals)

Pos	Team	Pld	W	D	L	GF	GA	GAv	Pts	Qualification or relegation
1	Everton (C)	42	29	8	5	72	34	2.118	66	Qualification for the European Cup first round
2	Leeds United	42	21	15	6	84	49	1.714	57	Qualification for the Inter-Cities Fairs Cup first round
3	Chelsea	42	21	13	8	70	50	1.400	55	Qualification for the Cup Winners' Cup first round (Note: Chelsea qualified for the Cup Winners' Cup first round as the 1969–70 FA Cup winners.)
4	Derby County	42	22	9	11	64	37	1.730	53	Qualification for the Watney Cup (Note: Derby County and Manchester United qualified for the Watney Cup as the two teams with the most goals that hadn't already qualified for a European competition.)
5	Liverpool	42	20	11	11	65	42	1.548	51	Qualification for the Inter-Cities Fairs Cup first round
6	Coventry City	42	19	11	12	58	48	1.208	49	Qualification for the Inter-Cities Fairs Cup first round
7	Newcastle United	42	17	13	12	57	35	1.629	47	Qualification for the Inter-Cities Fairs Cup first round
8	Manchester United	42	14	17	11	66	61	1.082	45	Qualification for the Watney Cup
9	Stoke City	42	15	15	12	56	52	1.077	45	
10	Manchester City	42	16	11	15	55	48	1.146	43	Qualification for the Cup Winners' Cup first round (Note: Manchester City qualified for the Cup Winners' Cup first round as the 1969–70 European Cup Winners' Cup winners.)
11	Tottenham Hotspur	42	17	9	16	54	55	0.982	43	
12	Arsenal	42	12	18	12	51	49	1.041	42	Qualification for the Inter-Cities Fairs Cup first round
13	Wolverhampton Wanderers	42	12	16	14	55	57	0.965	40	
14	Burnley	42	12	15	15	56	61	0.918	39	
15	Nottingham Forest	42	10	18	14	50	71	0.704	38	
16	West Bromwich Albion	42	14	9	19	58	66	0.879	37	
17	West Ham United	42	12	12	18	51	60	0.850	36	
18	Ipswich Town	42	10	11	21	40	63	0.635	31	
19	Southampton	42	6	17	19	46	67	0.687	29	
20	Crystal Palace	42	6	15	21	34	68	0.500	27	
21	Sunderland (R)	42	6	14	22	30	68	0.441	26	Relegation to the Second Division
22	Sheffield Wednesday (R)	42	8	9	25	40	71	0.563	25	Relegation to the Second Division

Source: World Football
Rules for classification: 1) Points; 2) Goal average; 3) Goals scored
(C) Champions; (R) Relegated

=== Results ===
Home \ Away	ARS	BUR	CHE	COV	CRY	DER	EVE	IPS	LEE	LIV	MCI	MUN	NEW	NOT	SHW	SOU	STK	SUN	TOT	WBA	WHU	WOL
Arsenal		3–2	0–3	0–1	2–0	4–0	0–1	0–0	1–1	2–1	1–1	2–2	0–0	2–1	0–0	2–2	0–0	3–1	2–3	1–1	2–1	2–2
Burnley	0–1		3–1	0–0	4–2	1–1	1–2	0–1	1–1	1–5	1–1	1–1	0–1	5–0	4–2	1–1	1–1	3–0	0–2	2–1	3–2	1–3
Chelsea	3–0	2–0		1–0	1–1	2–2	1–1	1–0	2–5	2–1	3–1	2–1	0–0	1–1	3–1	3–1	1–0	3–1	1–0	2–0	0–0	2–2
Coventry City	2–0	1–1	0–3		2–2	1–1	0–1	3–1	1–2	2–3	3–0	1–2	1–0	3–2	1–1	4–0	0–3	1–1	3–2	3–1	2–2	1–0
Crystal Palace	1–5	1–2	1–5	0–3		0–1	0–0	1–1	1–1	1–3	1–0	2–2	0–3	1–1	0–2	2–0	3–1	2–0	0–2	1–3	0–0	2–1
Derby County	3–2	0–0	2–2	1–3	3–1		2–1	3–1	4–1	4–0	0–1	2–0	2–0	0–2	1–0	3–0	0–0	3–0	5–0	2–0	3–0	2–0
Everton	2–2	2–1	5–2	0–0	2–1	1–0		3–0	3–2	0–3	1–0	3–0	0–0	1–0	2–1	4–2	6–2	3–1	3–2	2–0	2–0	1–0
Ipswich Town	2–1	0–1	1–4	0–1	2–0	0–1	0–3		3–2	2–2	1–1	0–1	2–0	0–0	1–0	2–0	1–1	2–0	2–0	0–1	1–0	1–1
Leeds United	0–0	2–1	2–0	3–1	2–0	2–0	2–1	4–0		1–1	1–3	2–2	1–1	6–1	2–0	1–3	2–1	2–0	3–1	5–1	4–1	3–1
Liverpool	0–1	3–3	4–1	2–1	3–0	0–2	0–2	2–0	0–0		3–2	1–4	0–0	1–1	3–0	4–1	3–1	2–0	0–0	1–1	2–0	0–0
Manchester City	1–1	1–1	0–0	3–1	0–1	0–1	1–1	1–0	1–2	0–2		4–0	2–1	1–1	4–1	1–0	0–1	0–1	1–1	2–1	1–5	1–0
Manchester United	2–1	3–3	0–2	1–1	1–1	1–0	0–2	2–1	2–2	1–0	1–2		0–0	1–1	2–2	1–4	1–1	3–1	3–1	7–0	5–2	0–0
Newcastle United	3–1	0–1	0–1	4–0	0–0	0–1	1–2	4–0	2–1	1–0	1–0	5–1		3–1	3–1	2–1	3–1	3–0	1–2	1–0	4–1	1–1
Nottingham Forest	1–1	1–1	1–1	1–4	0–0	1–3	1–1	1–0	1–4	1–0	2–2	1–2	2–2		2–1	2–1	0–0	2–1	2–2	1–0	1–0	4–2
Sheffield Wednesday	1–1	2–0	1–3	0–1	0–0	1–0	0–1	2–2	1–2	1–1	1–2	1–3	1–0	2–1		1–1	0–2	2–0	0–1	2–0	2–3	2–3
Southampton	0–2	1–1	2–2	0–0	1–1	1–1	2–1	4–2	1–1	0–1	0–0	0–3	1–1	1–2	4–0		0–0	1–1	2–2	0–2	1–1	2–3
Stoke City	0–0	2–1	1–2	2–0	1–0	1–0	0–1	3–3	1–1	0–2	2–0	2–2	0–1	1–1	2–1	2–1		4–2	1–1	3–2	2–1	1–1
Sunderland	1–1	0–1	0–0	0–0	0–0	1–1	0–0	2–1	0–0	0–1	0–4	1–1	1–1	2–1	1–2	2–2	0–3		2–1	2–2	0–1	2–1
Tottenham Hotspur	1–0	4–0	1–1	1–2	2–0	2–1	0–1	3–2	1–1	0–2	0–3	2–1	2–1	4–1	1–0	0–1	1–0	0–1		2–0	0–2	0–1
West Bromwich Albion	0–1	0–1	3–1	0–1	3–2	0–2	2–0	2–2	1–1	2–2	3–0	2–1	2–2	4–0	3–0	1–0	1–3	3–1	1–1		3–1	3–3
West Ham United	1–1	3–1	2–0	1–2	2–1	3–0	0–1	0–0	2–2	1–0	0–4	0–0	1–0	1–1	3–0	0–0	3–3	1–1	0–1	1–3		3–0
Wolverhampton Wanderers	2–0	1–1	3–0	0–1	1–1	1–1	2–3	2–0	1–2	0–1	1–3	0–0	1–1	3–3	2–2	2–1	3–1	1–0	2–2	1–0	1–0	

Updated to match(es) played on unknown. Source: Ian Laschke: Rothmans Book of Football League Records 1888–89 to 1978–79. Macdonald and Jane’s, London & Sydney, 1980.
Legend: Blue = home team win; Yellow = draw; Red = away team win.

=== Maps ===
Locations of the Football League First Division London teams 1969–1970
Locations of the Football League First Division 1969–1970 teams

=== Top scorers ===
Goalscorers are listed order of total goals, then according to the number of league goals, then of FA cup goals, then of League Cup goals. A dash means the team of the player in question did not participate in European competitions.

- The goals listed below in the European fields stem from the following competitions:
  - Leeds United participated in the 1969–70 European Cup.
  - Manchester City participated in the 1969–70 European Cup Winners' Cup.
  - Arsenal, Liverpool, Newcastle United and Southampton participated in 1969–70 Inter-Cities Fairs Cup

Rank	Scorer	Club	League goals	FA Cup goals	League Cup goals	Euro competitions	Total
1	(England) Peter Osgood	Chelsea	23	8	0	—	31
2	(England) Jeff Astle	West Bromwich Albion	25	0	5	—	30
3	(England) Allan Clarke	Leeds United	16	7	0	2	25
4	(England) Joe Royle	Everton	23	0	0	—	23
5	(Northern Ireland) George Best	Manchester United	15	6	2	—	23
6	(England) Francis Lee	Manchester City	14	0	3	6	23
7	(England) Ian Hutchinson	Chelsea	16	5	1	—	22
8	(England) Frank Clarke	Ipswich Town / Queens Park Rangers	2+14	2	4	—	22
9	(England) Brian Kidd	Manchester United	14	6	2	—	22
10	(England) Pop Robson	Newcastle United	21	0	0	0	21
11	(Scotland) Hugh Curran	Wolverhampton Wanderers	19	0	2	—	21
12	(Scotland) Bobby Graham	Liverpool	15	3	1	3	21
13	(England) John Radford	Arsenal	13	2	0	5	20
14	(England) Colin Bell	Manchester City	10	0	5	5	20
15	(England) Mick Channon	Southampton	15	3	1	0	19
16	(England) Steve Kindon	Burnley	17	0	1	—	18
17	(England) Geoff Hurst	West Ham United	16	0	2	—	18
18	(England) Mick Jones	Leeds United	15	3	0	8	18
19	(Republic of Ireland) Johnny Giles	Leeds United	12	2	0	4	18
20	(England) John Ritchie	Stoke City	14	2	0	—	16
21	(Scotland) John O’Hare	Derby County	13	2	1	—	16
22	(England) Harry Burrows	Stoke City	15	0	0	—	15
23	(Scotland) Neil Martin	Coventry City	14	1	0	—	15
24	(Scotland) Peter Lorimer	Leeds United	13	2	0	0	15
25	(England) Steve Downes	Sheffield Wednesday / Rotherham United	1+11	3	0	—	15
=	(England) Jimmy Greaves	West Ham United	12	3	0	—	15
27	(England) Colin Suggett	West Bromwich Albion	12	0	3	—	15
28	(England) Ian Bowyer	Manchester City	12	0	2	1	15
29	(England) Kevin Hector	Derby County	11	2	2	—	15
30	(England) John O’Rourke	Coventry City / Ipswich Town	11+2	0	0	—	13
31	(England) Tony Brown	West Bromwich Albion	10	1	2	—	13
32	(England) Keith Dyson	Newcastle United	12	0	0	2	12
33	(England) Ian Storey-Moore	Nottingham Forest	11	0	1	—	12
34	(England) Alan Ball	Everton	10	1	1	—	12
35	(Wales) Alan Durban	Derby County	8	4	0	—	12
36	(Scotland) Alan Gilzean	Tottenham Hotspur	11	0	0	—	11
=	(England) Martin Chivers	Tottenham Hotspur	11	0	0	—	11
38	(Scotland) Gerry Queen	Crystal Palace	9	1	1	—	11
39	(England) Jack Whitham	Sheffield Wednesday	8	3	0	—	11
40	(England) Martin Dobson	Burnley	6	3	2	—	11
41	(Wales) Ron Davies	Southampton	10	0	0	0	10
42	(England) Alan Hinton	Derby County	6	0	4	—	10

== Second Division ==
Second Division
- Season: 1969–70
- Champions: Huddersfield Town
- Promoted: Huddersfield Town; Blackpool
- Relegated: Aston Villa; Preston North End
- Cup Winners' Cup: Cardiff City
- Watney Cup: Sheffield United; Hull City
- Matches: 462
- Goals: 1,207 (2.61 per match)
- Top goalscorer: John Hickton (24 goals)

Pos	Team	Pld	W	D	L	GF	GA	GAv	Pts	Qualification or relegation
1	Huddersfield Town (C, P)	42	24	12	6	68	37	1.838	60	Promotion to the First Division
2	Blackpool (P)	42	20	13	9	56	45	1.244	53	Promotion to the First Division
3	Leicester City	42	19	13	10	64	50	1.280	51	
4	Middlesbrough	42	20	10	12	55	45	1.222	50	
5	Swindon Town	42	17	16	9	57	47	1.213	50	
6	Sheffield United	42	22	5	15	73	38	1.921	49	Qualification for the Watney Cup (Note: Sheffield United and Hull City qualified for the Watney Cup as the two teams with the most goals that hadn't already qualified for promotion or a European competition.)
7	Cardiff City	42	18	13	11	61	41	1.488	49	Qualification for the Cup Winners' Cup first round (Note: Cardiff City qualified for the European Cup Winners' Cup as the 1969-70 Welsh Cup winners.)
8	Blackburn Rovers	42	20	7	15	54	50	1.080	47	
9	Queens Park Rangers	42	17	11	14	66	57	1.158	45	
10	Millwall	42	15	14	13	56	56	1.000	44	
11	Norwich City	42	16	11	15	49	46	1.065	43	
12	Carlisle United	42	14	13	15	58	56	1.036	41	
13	Hull City	42	15	11	16	72	70	1.029	41	Qualification for the Watney Cup
14	Bristol City	42	13	13	16	54	50	1.080	39	
15	Oxford United	42	12	15	15	35	42	0.833	39	
16	Bolton Wanderers	42	12	12	18	54	61	0.885	36	
17	Portsmouth	42	13	9	20	66	80	0.825	35	
18	Birmingham City	42	11	11	20	51	78	0.654	33	
19	Watford	42	9	13	20	44	57	0.772	31	
20	Charlton Athletic	42	7	17	18	35	76	0.461	31	
21	Aston Villa (R)	42	8	13	21	36	62	0.581	29	Relegation to the Third Division
22	Preston North End (R)	42	8	12	22	43	63	0.683	28	Relegation to the Third Division

Rules for classification: 1) Points; 2) Goal average; 3) Goals scored
(C) Champions; (P) Promoted; (R) Relegated

=== Results ===
Home \ Away	AST	BIR	BLB	BLP	BOL	BRI	CAR	CRL	CHA	HUD	HUL	LEI	MID	MIL	NWC	OXF	POR	PNE	QPR	SHU	SWI	WAT
Aston Villa		0–0	1–1	0–0	3–0	0–2	1–1	1–0	1–0	4–1	3–2	0–1	2–0	2–2	0–1	0–0	3–5	0–0	1–1	1–0	0–2	0–2
Birmingham	0–2		3–0	2–3	2–0	2–2	1–1	1–1	3–0	2–2	2–4	0–1	0–0	2–0	3–1	1–3	1–1	1–0	3–0	2–1	2–0	0–0
Blackburn Rovers	2–0	1–1		2–1	3–1	3–3	1–0	1–0	3–0	0–2	2–1	3–1	4–0	4–0	3–1	2–0	0–3	4–2	0–1	1–2	2–0	1–0
Blackpool	2–1	2–0	0–0		1–1	1–0	3–2	1–1	2–0	2–0	0–1	1–1	1–1	1–1	0–0	1–0	2–1	0–0	1–1	1–0	3–2	0–3
Bolton Wanderers	2–1	2–0	1–0	0–2		3–1	0–1	0–0	1–1	1–1	2–1	2–3	2–1	4–1	0–0	1–1	0–1	2–0	6–4	0–0	0–1	2–3
Bristol City	1–0	2–0	4–0	2–1	2–2		0–2	0–0	6–0	1–2	3–1	0–0	0–0	1–1	4–0	2–0	3–0	0–0	2–0	0–1	3–3	1–0
Cardiff City	4–0	3–1	0–0	2–2	2–1	1–0		1–1	1–0	0–1	6–0	1–1	1–0	0–0	0–1	0–0	2–0	2–1	4–2	3–0	2–2	3–1
Carlisle United	1–1	4–3	0–1	1–2	2–1	2–1	2–3		1–1	0–2	2–1	2–2	1–0	4–0	2–1	1–1	3–3	1–0	3–2	0–1	2–2	5–0
Charlton Athletic	1–0	0–1	0–0	0–2	1–1	2–1	0–0	2–1		1–2	1–4	0–5	0–2	2–2	3–0	1–0	2–2	2–1	1–1	3–2	1–1	0–0
Huddersfield Town	2–0	2–0	0–1	2–0	1–0	3–0	1–0	1–0	4–0		2–2	1–1	0–0	0–0	1–1	1–0	4–0	3–2	2–0	2–1	1–1	3–1
Hull City	3–1	0–0	3–0	1–0	4–2	2–0	1–1	2–4	1–1	2–3		4–1	3–2	2–1	1–0	3–1	3–3	3–1	1–2	2–3	1–1	1–1
Leicester City	1–0	3–1	2–1	0–0	2–2	2–0	1–2	1–2	2–2	1–1	2–2		2–1	1–1	3–0	2–1	2–1	3–0	2–1	2–1	0–2	3–1
Middlesbrough	1–0	4–2	4–1	0–2	4–0	2–0	2–1	0–2	2–0	1–1	1–0	2–1		3–1	0–0	2–0	2–1	1–1	1–0	1–0	0–0	3–1
Millwall	2–0	6–2	3–1	1–3	2–0	1–1	1–2	4–2	1–1	1–0	2–1	0–1	1–1		1–0	0–0	3–1	2–1	2–0	1–0	3–1	1–0
Norwich City	3–1	6–0	0–1	3–1	1–0	4–1	1–1	1–0	1–1	1–2	2–1	3–0	2–0	2–1		2–0	0–0	1–2	1–0	1–1	1–0	1–1
Oxford United	2–2	2–0	1–0	2–0	3–1	2–0	1–1	1–0	1–1	1–2	0–0	0–1	1–1	0–0	1–0		0–2	3–1	0–0	0–0	0–0	2–1
Portsmouth	0–0	1–1	2–0	2–3	1–1	0–0	3–0	4–0	5–1	1–3	1–4	2–3	2–3	0–1	1–4	2–1		4–0	1–3	1–5	3–1	3–1
Preston North End	1–1	4–1	0–0	0–3	1–3	0–1	1–2	3–1	4–1	1–3	3–3	2–1	0–1	1–1	1–1	0–1	1–2		0–0	2–1	3–1	3–0
Queens Park Rangers	4–2	2–1	2–3	6–1	0–4	2–2	2–1	0–0	1–1	4–2	3–0	1–1	4–0	3–2	4–0	1–2	2–0	0–0		2–1	2–0	2–1
Sheffield United	5–0	6–0	4–0	2–3	0–1	2–1	1–0	1–0	2–0	0–0	3–0	1–0	3–0	3–1	1–0	5–1	5–0	2–0	2–0		1–2	1–1
Swindon Town	1–1	4–1	1–0	1–1	3–2	1–1	2–1	2–2	5–0	2–1	1–0	1–1	0–3	2–1	2–0	0–0	3–1	1–0	0–0	2–1		1–0
Watford	3–0	2–3	0–2	0–1	0–0	2–0	2–1	1–2	1–1	1–1	1–1	2–1	2–3	1–1	1–1	2–0	4–0	0–0	0–1	1–2	0–0	

Updated to match(es) played on unknown. Source: Ian Laschke: Rothmans Book of Football League Records 1888–89 to 1978–79. Macdonald and Jane’s, London & Sydney, 1980.
Legend: Blue = home team win; Yellow = draw; Red = away team win.

=== Maps ===
Locations of the Football League Second Division London teams 1969–1970
Locations of the Football League Second Division 1969–1970 teams

=== Top scorers ===
Goalscorers are listed order of total goals, then according to the number of league goals, then of FA cup goals, then of League Cup goals. A dash means the team of the player in question did not participate in European competitions.

Rank	Scorer	Club	League goals	FA Cup goals	League Cup goals	Cup Winners' Cup goals	Total
1	(England) John Hickton	Middlesbrough	23	4	0	—	27
2	(England) John Byrom	Bolton Wanderers	20	0	5	—	25
3	(England) Barry Bridges	Queens Park Rangers	21	1	1	—	23
4	(England) Rodney Marsh	Queens Park Rangers	12	4	7	—	23
5	(England) Alan Woodward	Sheffield United	18	0	3	—	21
6	(England) Arthur Horsfield	Swindon Town	16	4	0	—	20
7	(England) Brian Clark	Cardiff City	18	0	0	2	20
8	(Wales) John Toshack	Cardiff City	17	1	0	2	20
9	(England) Frank Worthington	Huddersfield Town	18	1	0	—	19
=	(England) Derek Possee	Millwall	18	1	0	—	19
11	(England) Chris Chilton	Hull City	18	0	1	—	19
12	(England) Peter Noble	Swindon Town	15	1	3	—	19
13	(England) Ken Wagstaff	Hull City	18	0	0	—	18
=	(England) Ray Hiron	Portsmouth	18	0	0	—	18
15	(England) Fred Pickering	Blackpool	17	1	0	—	18
16	(England) Rodney Fern	Leicester City	16	0	1	—	17
17	(England) Ken Houghton	Hull City	16	0	0	—	16
18	(Wales) Gil Reece	Sheffield United	14	0	1	—	15
19	(England) Bob Hatton	Carlisle United	13	1	1	—	15
20	(England) Don Martin	Blackburn Rovers	13	0	2	—	15
21	(England) Chris Balderstone	Carlisle United	12	1	1	—	14
22	(England) Barry Endean	Watford	10	3	1	—	14
23	(England) Peter King	Cardiff City	10	1	0	3	14
24	(England) Phil Summerill	Birmingham City	13	0	0	—	13
=	(Scotland) Jim Storrie	Portsmouth / Rotherham United	13	0	0	—	13
26	(England) Ken Skeen	Oxford United	9	1	3	—	13
27	(England) Bert Murray	Birmingham City	12	0	0	—	12
=	(England) Albert McCann	Portsmouth	12	0	0	—	12
=	(England) Tony Currie	Sheffield United	12	0	0	—	12
30	(England) Joe Laidlaw	Middlesbrough	11	1	0	—	12
31	(England) Roger Hunt	Bolton Wanderers / Liverpool	6+5	0	0	1 (Note: Roger Hunt’s goal in European tournaments was scored for Liverpool in the 1969–70 Inter-Cities Fairs Cup.)	12
32	(England) John Tudor	Sheffield United	10	2	0	—	12
33	(Scotland) Andy Lochhead	Leicester City	6	2	4	—	12
34	(Scotland) Ken Foggo	Norwich City	11	0	0	—	11
35	(England) Gerry Sharpe	Bristol City	10	0	1	—	11
36	(England) John Galley	Bristol City	10	0	0	—	10
=	(England) Peter Silverster	Norwich City	10	0	0	—	10
=	(England) Nicky Jennings	Portsmouth	10	0	0	—	10
39	(England) Don Rogers	Swindon Town	9	1	0	—	10
40	(England) Keith Weller	Millwall	9	0	1	—	10
41	(Scotland) Hughie McIlmoyle	Middlesbrough / Carlisle United	6+2	0	2	—	10

== Third Division ==
Football League Third Division
- Season: 1969–70
- Champions: Orient (1st title)
- Promoted: Luton Town
- Relegated: Barrow, Bournemouth & Boscombe Athletic, Southport, Stockport County
- Matches: 552
- Goals: 1,460 (2.64 per match)
- Top goalscorer: George Jones (Bury), 26

Pos	Team	Pld	W	D	L	GF	GA	GAv	Pts	Promotion or relegation
1	Orient (C, P)	46	25	12	9	67	36	1.861	62	Promotion to the Second Division
2	Luton Town (P)	46	23	14	9	77	43	1.791	60	Promotion to the Second Division
3	Bristol Rovers	46	20	16	10	80	59	1.356	56	
4	Fulham	46	20	15	11	81	55	1.473	55	Qualified for the Watney Cup (Note: The two teams who scored the most goals in each division, and did not qualify for Europe and were not promoted, qualified for the Watney Cup.)
5	Brighton & Hove Albion	46	23	9	14	57	43	1.326	55	
6	Mansfield Town	46	21	11	14	70	49	1.429	53	
7	Barnsley	46	19	15	12	68	59	1.153	53	
8	Reading	46	21	11	14	87	77	1.130	53	Qualified for the Watney Cup
9	Rochdale	46	18	10	18	69	60	1.150	46	
10	Bradford City	46	17	12	17	57	50	1.140	46	
11	Doncaster Rovers	46	17	12	17	52	54	0.963	46	
12	Walsall	46	17	12	17	54	67	0.806	46	
13	Torquay United	46	14	17	15	62	59	1.051	45	
14	Rotherham United	46	15	14	17	62	54	1.148	44	
15	Shrewsbury Town	46	13	18	15	62	63	0.984	44	
16	Tranmere Rovers	46	14	16	16	56	72	0.778	44	
17	Plymouth Argyle	46	16	11	19	56	64	0.875	43	
18	Halifax Town	46	14	15	17	47	63	0.746	43	
19	Bury	46	15	11	20	75	80	0.938	41	
20	Gillingham	46	13	13	20	52	64	0.813	39	
21	Bournemouth & Boscombe Athletic (R)	46	12	15	19	48	71	0.676	39	Relegation to the Fourth Division
22	Southport (R)	46	14	10	22	48	66	0.727	38	Relegation to the Fourth Division
23	Barrow (R)	46	8	14	24	46	81	0.568	30	Relegation to the Fourth Division
24	Stockport County (R)	46	6	11	29	27	71	0.380	23	Relegation to the Fourth Division

(C) Champions; (P) Promoted; (R) Relegated

=== Results ===
Home \ Away	BAR	BRW	B&BA	BRA	B&HA	BRR	BRY	DON	FUL	GIL	HAL	LUT	MAN	ORI	PLY	REA	ROC	ROT	SHR	SOU	STP	TOR	TRA	WAL
Barnsley		2–1	1–0	3–2	1–2	2–0	3–3	2–1	3–3	5–1	2–0	2–1	1–1	1–2	0–1	4–3	1–0	1–0	1–1	1–1	1–0	3–0	1–1	2–0
Barrow	1–1		1–1	0–1	1–1	1–1	3–1	1–1	3–1	1–1	0–1	2–1	0–1	1–1	1–1	2–2	2–0	1–2	2–0	1–0	4–1	0–4	0–3	0–1
Bournemouth & Boscombe Athletic	3–1	0–0		0–0	0–0	2–2	2–0	3–1	2–2	2–1	0–0	0–1	1–0	0–2	1–3	1–2	0–3	1–0	3–3	1–0	1–0	1–2	2–2	2–2
Bradford City	1–1	3–3	8–1		1–0	2–4	0–1	3–0	0–0	1–0	2–1	1–1	0–1	0–1	1–0	4–0	0–3	0–1	2–2	1–0	1–0	2–1	1–1	3–0
Brighton & Hove Albion	2–0	2–0	1–1	2–1		0–3	2–0	1–0	2–1	3–1	4–0	1–2	1–2	0–0	2–0	2–1	2–0	2–1	1–0	1–0	1–0	2–2	2–0	1–1
Bristol Rovers	3–3	2–1	5–2	1–1	0–2		2–1	1–1	3–2	1–2	2–0	3–0	4–1	1–0	3–1	1–1	3–3	3–0	1–3	2–0	1–0	3–1	3–0	3–1
Bury	1–2	4–0	1–0	0–2	1–2	2–2		1–1	1–0	1–3	1–1	1–3	1–0	0–1	3–1	2–1	2–1	2–1	2–2	4–3	4–1	1–0	8–0	4–2
Doncaster Rovers	1–0	3–2	2–1	1–1	2–0	3–1	1–1		0–1	1–0	0–1	2–0	2–0	0–1	1–1	2–3	3–1	1–2	2–1	1–0	0–1	1–0	2–1	0–0
Fulham	0–0	2–1	1–1	0–0	4–1	3–1	2–4	1–1		2–1	2–1	0–1	1–1	1–1	4–3	2–1	2–0	3–2	3–1	3–2	1–1	1–1	1–1	4–0
Gillingham	1–3	0–1	0–0	1–1	0–1	1–0	1–0	2–1	2–0		2–0	0–2	3–3	0–1	4–0	1–3	2–2	1–1	2–1	2–4	0–2	2–4	0–0	1–3
Halifax Town	0–2	3–0	4–1	0–0	1–0	1–1	2–0	1–1	0–8	1–1		0–0	1–2	1–1	2–0	1–1	3–1	4–2	1–0	1–0	1–0	1–1	2–2	0–1
Luton Town	1–1	3–0	0–0	5–0	1–1	4–0	0–0	4–0	1–0	1–2	1–1		2–2	3–2	0–2	5–0	2–0	2–1	2–2	1–0	2–0	1–1	2–0	3–0
Mansfield Town	2–0	4–2	2–0	2–1	1–0	1–1	3–1	1–2	2–3	1–0	3–3	0–0		4–1	1–2	2–1	1–2	2–0	2–0	5–0	4–1	2–0	1–2	0–0
Orient	4–2	2–0	3–0	2–1	1–1	0–0	3–0	2–0	3–1	1–2	1–0	1–0	1–0		4–1	0–1	2–2	1–1	1–0	3–2	3–0	1–1	2–0	2–0
Plymouth Argyle	0–0	1–0	0–1	0–1	0–1	2–2	2–2	0–0	2–0	2–2	1–0	1–3	1–0	1–0		1–1	2–3	0–3	4–2	1–1	2–0	6–0	2–1	1–0
Reading	6–2	6–3	2–0	1–0	1–0	1–5	3–2	1–0	0–4	1–0	4–1	0–1	1–0	3–2	2–1		1–0	1–1	3–1	8–0	3–1	1–1	1–1	2–3
Rochdale	1–1	1–0	0–1	1–2	2–1	0–0	3–3	2–0	0–1	0–0	5–0	1–2	2–1	0–3	2–1	3–2		4–2	3–0	1–1	2–0	1–1	4–0	1–2
Rotherham United	2–0	5–0	3–0	2–3	2–0	0–0	4–3	0–1	0–0	0–1	1–1	1–1	2–2	0–0	1–0	1–1	3–1		1–2	2–0	0–0	2–1	0–1	4–1
Shrewsbury Town	1–1	1–1	2–0	1–0	2–2	0–0	3–3	0–0	1–1	2–2	3–1	5–1	0–0	1–1	3–0	0–0	1–0	1–0		1–2	3–1	1–0	2–0	1–1
Southport	0–1	1–0	3–0	1–0	2–0	0–0	4–0	2–2	0–2	1–1	1–0	0–3	0–1	1–0	0–0	6–2	0–3	2–1	0–2		1–1	4–2	2–0	0–1
Stockport County	1–0	2–2	0–2	0–2	0–1	0–1	1–0	3–1	1–4	1–0	0–1	1–1	1–3	0–2	0–1	2–2	0–1	1–1	1–1	0–0		0–1	0–1	2–2
Torquay United	1–1	1–1	2–2	2–1	2–1	1–2	3–0	2–1	1–1	3–2	0–1	2–2	0–2	0–1	1–2	1–1	3–0	0–0	3–0	0–0	3–0		5–1	0–0
Tranmere Rovers	0–1	5–0	1–5	1–0	2–0	5–2	3–2	1–3	1–0	0–0	1–1	3–2	1–1	1–1	3–1	1–5	0–0	2–2	3–1	0–1	3–0	1–1		0–0
Walsall	3–2	1–0	2–1	2–0	0–3	2–1	1–1	1–3	1–3	0–1	2–1	1–3	1–0	2–0	2–2	4–1	1–4	0–2	3–2	4–0	0–0	0–1	0–0	

Updated to match(es) played on unknown. Source: Ian Laschke: Rothmans Book of Football League Records 1888–89 to 1978–79. Macdonald and Jane’s, London & Sydney, 1980.
Legend: Blue = home team win; Yellow = draw; Red = away team win.

=== Maps ===
Locations of the Football League Third Division London teams 1969–1970
Locations of the Football League Third Division teams 1969–1970

=== Top scorers ===
Goalscorers are listed order of total goals, then according to the number of league goals, then of FA cup goals, then of League Cup goals. A dash means the team of the player in question did not participate in European competitions.

Rank	Scorer	Club	League goals	FA Cup goals	League Cup goals	Total
1	(England) Malcolm Macdonald	Luton Town	24	1	2	27
2	(England) George Jones	Bury	26	0	0	26
3	(England) Les Chappell	Reading	25	0	0	25
4	(England) Steve Earle	Fulham	22	0	1	23
5	(Scotland) George Kerr	Bury	20	2	1	23
6	(Republic of Ireland) Jimmy Convay	Fulham	22	0	0	22
7	(Scotland) Ted MacDougall	Bournemouth & Boscombe Athletic	21	0	1	22
8	(England) George Andrews	Shrewsbury Town / Southport	13+6	0	2	21
9	(England) Reg Jenkins	Rochdale	20	0	0	20
10	(Scotland) George Yardley	Tranmere Rovers	17	2	1	20
=	(England) Terry Bell	Reading / Hartlepool	2+15	2	1	20
12	(England) Mickey Bullock	Orient	19	0	0	19
13	(England) Dudley Roberts	Mansfield Town	18	0	0	18
=	(England) Mike Bickle	Plymouth Argyle	18	0	0	18
15	(England) Bobby Ham	Bradford City	16	0	2	18
16	(England) Robin Stubbs	Bristol Rovers	15	2	0	17
17	(England) Allan Gilliver	Brighton & Hove Albion	13	2	2	17
18	(Northern Ireland) Terry Harkin	Shrewsbury Town	16	0	0	16
=	(England) Tony Field	Southport	16	0	0	16
=	(England) Alan Welsh	Torquay United	16	0	0	16
21	(England) John Rudge	Torquay United	14	1	1	16
22	(England) John Evans	Barnsley	15	0	0	15
=	(England) Tony Buck	Rochdale	15	0	0	15
24	(England) Malcolm Partridge	Mansfield Town	13	2	0	15
25	(England) Brian Yeo	Gillingham	9	5	1	15
26	(England) Bobby Williams	Reading	14	0	0	14
27	(England) Ray Graydon	Bristol Rovers	13	1	0	14
28	(England) Dennis Butler	Rochdale	12	2	0	14
29	(England) Mike Green	Gillingham	11	3	0	14
30	Derek Smith	Tranmere Rovers	11	2	1	14
31	(England) Ken Beamish	Tranmere Rovers	10	3	1	14
32	(England) Peter Middleton	Bradford City	11	2	0	13
=	(Wales) Dai Jones	Mansfield Town	11	2	0	13
34	(England) Colin Taylor	Walsall	9	4	0	13
35	Dean	Bournemouth & Boscombe Athletic	12	0	0	12
=	(England) Carl Gilbert	Bristol Rovers	12	0	0	12
=	(England) Barrie Fairbrother	Orient	12	0	0	12
=	(England) John Regan	Doncaster Rovers	12	0	0	12
39	(Scotland) Matt Tees	Luton Town	11	1	0	12
40	(England) John Collins	Luton Town	10	2	0	12
=	(Scotland) Richard Moir	Shrewsbury Town	10	2	0	12
42	(Scotland) Alex Dawson	Brighton & Hove Albion	9	2	1	12
43	(England) Jim Mulvaney	Barrow	11	0	0	11
44	(Scotland) Kit Napier	Brighton & Hove Albion	10	1	0	11
45	(England) Eddie Loyden	Barnsley	9	2	0	11
46	(England) Harold Jarman	Bristol Rovers	10	0	0	10
47	(England) Ken Pound	Gillingham	9	1	0	10
=	(England) John Rowlands	Stockport County	9	1	0	10
=	(England) Bill Atkins	Halifax Town / Portsmouth	7+2	1	0	10
50	(England) Les O’Neill	Bradford City	8	2	0	10

== Fourth Division ==
Football League Fourth Division
- Season: 1969–70
- Champions: Chesterfield (1st title)
- Promoted: Port Vale, Swansea City, Wrexham
- Failed re-election: Bradford Park Avenue
- Matches: 552
- Goals: 1,464 (2.65 per match)
- Top goalscorer: Albert Kinsey, (Wrexham), 27

Pos	Team	Pld	W	D	L	GF	GA	GAv	Pts	Promotion or relegation
1	Chesterfield (C, P)	46	27	10	9	77	32	2.406	64	Promotion to the Third Division
2	Wrexham (P)	46	26	9	11	84	49	1.714	61	Promotion to the Third Division
3	Swansea City (P)	46	21	18	7	66	45	1.467	60	Promotion to the Third Division
4	Port Vale (P)	46	20	19	7	61	33	1.848	59	Promotion to the Third Division
5	Brentford	46	20	16	10	58	39	1.487	56	
6	Aldershot	46	20	13	13	78	65	1.200	53	Qualified for the Watney Cup (Note: The two teams who scored the most goals in each division, and did not qualify for Europe and were not promoted, qualified for the Watney Cup.)
7	Notts County	46	22	8	16	73	62	1.177	52	
8	Lincoln City	46	17	16	13	66	52	1.269	50	
9	Peterborough United	46	17	14	15	77	69	1.116	48	Qualified for the Watney Cup
10	Colchester United	46	17	14	15	64	63	1.016	48	
11	Chester	46	21	6	19	58	66	0.879	48	
12	Scunthorpe United	46	18	10	18	67	65	1.031	46	
13	York City	46	16	14	16	55	62	0.887	46	
14	Northampton Town	46	16	12	18	64	55	1.164	44	
15	Crewe Alexandra	46	16	12	18	51	51	1.000	44	
16	Grimsby Town	46	14	15	17	54	58	0.931	43	
17	Southend United	46	15	10	21	59	85	0.694	40	
18	Exeter City	46	14	11	21	57	59	0.966	39	
19	Oldham Athletic	46	13	13	20	60	65	0.923	39	
20	Workington	46	12	14	20	46	64	0.719	38	
21	Newport County	46	13	11	22	53	74	0.716	37	Re-elected
22	Darlington	46	13	10	23	53	73	0.726	36	Re-elected
23	Hartlepool	46	10	10	26	42	82	0.512	30	Re-elected
24	Bradford (Park Avenue) (R)	46	6	11	29	41	96	0.427	23	Failed re-election and demoted to the Northern Premier League

Source: rsssf.com
(C) Champions; (P) Promoted; (R) Relegated

=== Results ===
Home \ Away	ALD	BPA	BRE	CHE	CHF	COL	CRE	DAR	EXE	GRI	HAR	LIN	NPC	NOR	NTC	OLD	PET	PTV	SCU	STD	SWA	WRK	WRE	YOR
Aldershot		4–2	1–2	3–1	1–0	1–1	4–1	4–0	1–0	2–2	4–1	1–1	1–1	5–2	2–0	1–0	1–0	2–0	3–1	2–1	2–2	3–1	0–2	4–1
Bradford Park Avenue	2–0		0–1	1–2	1–1	0–1	0–0	0–1	2–1	1–1	3–0	0–3	1–1	1–2	1–3	0–0	2–3	1–2	0–5	1–0	0–2	2–0	2–3	2–0
Brentford	0–0	1–1		2–0	0–1	2–0	1–1	1–1	2–0	3–0	3–0	2–1	1–0	1–0	1–0	1–1	5–2	1–0	3–0	3–1	2–2	1–0	0–0	0–0
Chester	2–1	1–0	1–2		1–2	1–0	2–1	1–3	2–0	3–1	2–1	1–2	2–0	2–1	0–1	2–1	2–3	1–1	1–1	2–0	2–2	3–0	2–0	3–0
Chesterfield	4–2	4–0	1–0	0–1		2–0	1–0	2–0	2–1	1–2	3–0	4–0	4–0	2–1	5–0	3–1	3–1	0–1	2–1	3–0	0–0	4–0	2–0	3–1
Colchester United	3–1	2–1	1–1	0–1	4–1		1–0	2–1	2–1	3–2	1–1	2–0	1–1	0–3	2–1	3–1	2–1	0–0	0–2	0–2	1–1	3–0	2–0	3–0
Crewe Alexandra	1–0	0–0	1–2	3–0	2–1	0–1		2–0	1–1	3–0	3–0	3–1	1–1	2–0	1–1	1–1	2–0	0–0	0–2	5–3	0–1	1–0	2–3	3–0
Darlington	0–2	1–1	1–2	1–2	0–1	3–2	2–0		4–0	0–0	4–0	0–3	0–0	2–2	1–2	1–1	1–2	2–2	2–0	0–2	2–1	1–1	2–1	1–0
Exeter City	2–1	3–0	2–2	1–0	1–1	2–1	3–0	1–2		0–1	6–0	1–2	1–1	1–0	1–1	0–2	1–1	1–2	4–1	3–0	6–0	5–1	1–0	2–1
Grimsby Town	2–2	2–2	2–1	4–1	1–0	5–3	0–2	0–1	2–0		2–0	0–2	1–1	0–1	2–1	4–1	0–0	2–0	1–1	2–2	0–2	1–1	0–0	0–0
Hartlepool	1–3	5–2	0–0	1–2	0–0	0–0	1–1	1–3	2–0	0–1		0–3	0–1	1–1	4–0	1–1	4–2	0–2	1–2	2–1	3–0	1–0	1–3	2–2
Lincoln City	1–1	5–2	1–0	2–0	0–2	3–3	2–1	1–0	1–0	2–0	3–0		3–0	0–0	2–4	0–1	3–0	0–0	1–2	3–3	0–0	1–1	0–0	4–0
Newport County	3–4	5–1	1–0	3–1	0–2	4–1	0–0	2–1	2–0	1–0	1–1	3–1		0–2	1–0	2–1	0–1	1–1	3–0	4–0	1–2	0–1	1–2	1–2
Northampton Town	4–0	3–0	1–1	0–1	0–1	1–1	1–2	1–1	2–0	3–1	0–1	1–1	4–1		3–1	0–0	2–2	2–0	2–1	2–0	4–1	3–0	0–1	2–2
Notts County	3–0	5–2	1–0	3–0	1–1	1–1	0–1	4–1	4–0	2–1	1–0	2–0	4–1	2–0		0–0	2–2	1–2	3–1	2–0	0–1	0–3	3–2	0–2
Oldham Athletic	4–2	0–0	4–1	5–0	1–0	1–2	2–1	1–1	1–1	0–2	1–0	1–1	3–0	0–2	5–0		4–2	2–3	1–3	3–0	0–1	1–2	2–3	3–1
Peterborough United	4–1	2–1	0–0	0–0	1–2	1–1	3–0	3–2	1–1	1–0	4–0	2–1	4–0	1–0	1–0	8–1		0–0	2–2	3–4	1–1	1–1	5–2	3–1
Port Vale	0–0	4–1	0–0	3–0	1–1	1–1	2–0	4–0	2–0	1–0	3–0	0–0	3–1	4–1	1–1	1–0	0–0		1–2	3–0	0–0	3–1	1–0	1–1
Scunthorpe United	0–0	2–0	1–1	2–3	1–2	1–1	0–1	2–0	0–0	1–1	3–1	2–1	4–0	1–0	2–3	2–1	2–1	2–1		2–0	1–2	1–0	1–3	1–1
Southend United	2–2	1–1	2–2	4–2	0–0	2–1	2–0	2–0	1–1	1–3	0–2	2–2	3–2	2–2	2–5	1–0	2–0	1–1	3–0		2–1	3–1	1–0	1–0
Swansea City	1–1	5–0	1–0	2–1	0–0	1–0	3–0	3–1	0–0	2–0	3–0	2–2	1–1	3–2	1–1	4–0	4–1	0–0	2–1	2–0		0–0	1–2	2–1
Workington	1–2	1–0	1–2	1–1	1–1	1–1	1–0	1–0	1–2	0–0	1–3	1–1	3–0	2–0	0–2	1–0	1–1	3–2	2–2	5–0	0–0		2–0	1–1
Wrexham	1–1	4–0	1–0	2–0	2–1	4–2	2–2	6–2	3–0	3–2	1–0	0–0	3–0	3–0	2–0	1–1	2–1	1–1	2–1	4–0	1–1	4–1		4–0
York City	2–0	4–1	4–2	0–0	1–1	4–2	0–0	2–1	1–0	1–1	0–0	2–0	2–1	1–1	1–2	0–0	3–0	0–1	3–2	1–0	3–0	1–0	2–1	

Updated to match(es) played on unknown. Source: Ian Laschke: Rothmans Book of Football League Records 1888–89 to 1978–79. Macdonald and Jane’s, London & Sydney, 1980.
Legend: Blue = home team win; Yellow = draw; Red = away team win.

=== Maps ===
Locations of the Football League Fourth Division teams 1969–1970
Locations of the Football League Fourth Division London teams 1969–1970

=== Top scorers ===
Goalscorers are listed order of total goals, then according to the number of league goals, then of FA cup goals, then of League Cup goals. A dash means the team of the player in question did not participate in European competitions.

Rank	Scorer	Club	League goals	FA Cup goals	League Cup goals	Total
1	(England) Albert Kinsey	Wrexham	27	1	1	29
2	(England) Jim Hall	Peterborough United	24	3	1	28
3	(England) Jack Howarth	Aldershot	19	7	0	26
4	(England) Stuart Brace	Grimsby Town	25	0	0	25
5	(England) John Fairbrother	Northampton Town	23	2	0	25
6	(England) Nigel Cassidy	Scunthorpe United	21	4	0	25
7	(Scotland) Billy Best	Southend United	23	1	0	24
8	(Scotland) Don Masson	Notts County	23	0	0	23
9	(Wales) Dave Gwyther	Swansea City	16	5	1	22
10	(England) Dennis Brown	Aldershot	17	4	0	21
11	(England) Ernie Moss	Chesterfield	20	0	0	20
12	(England) Richie Barker	Notts County	19	1	0	20
13	(Wales) Peter Price	Peterborough United	16	3	1	20
14	(England) Kevin Randall	Chesterfield	18	0	0	18
15	(Wales) Arfon Griffiths	Wrexham	16	2	0	18
16	(England) Rod Fletcher	Lincoln City	16	1	0	17
17	(England) Ray Smith	Wrexham	15	2	0	17
18	(England) John James	Port Vale	14	3	0	17
19	(England) Ken Jones	Colchester United	15	0	0	15
20	(England) Terry Heath	Scunthorpe United	13	2	0	15
=	(Wales) Herbie Williams	Swansea City	13	2	0	15
22	(England) Bill Dearden	Chester	11	3	1	15
23	(England) Brian Gibbs	Colchester United	14	0	0	14
=	(England) Ray Mabbutt	Newport County	14	0	0	14
25	(England) Tommy Robson	Peterborough United	12	1	1	14
26	Bobby Ross	Brentford	13	0	0	13
=	(England) Mike Hickman	Grimsby Town	13	0	0	13
=	(England) Jim Fryatt	Oldham Athletic / Blackburn Rovers	2+11	0	0	13
29	(England) Frank Large	Northampton Town	10	2	1	13
30	(Wales) Derek Draper	Chester	12	0	0	12
=	(England) David Shaw	Oldham Athletic	12	0	0	12
32	(Wales) Geoffrey Thomas	Swansea City	11	0	1	12
33	(England) Alan Banks	Exeter City	10	1	1	12
34	(England) Phil Boyer	York City	9	3	0	12
35	(England) Ronnie Walton	Aldershot	11	0	0	11
=	(England) Alan Bradshaw	Crewe Alexandra	11	0	0	11
37	(England) John Archer	Chesterfield	10	1	0	11
38	(England) Fred Binney	Exeter City / Torquay United	1+9	0	1	11
=	Jim Beardall	Oldham Athletic	10	0	1	11
40	(England) Alan Tarbuck	Chester	8	3	0	11
41	(England) Roy Massey	Colchester United / Crewe Alexandra	5+2	0	4	11
42	(England) Jimmy Melia	Aldershot	10	0	0	10
=	(England) Lance Robson	Hartlepool / Darlington	2+8	0	0	10
=	(England) Kevin McMahon	York City	10	0	0	10
45	John Mitten	Exeter City	9	1	0	10
46	Roy Young	Hartlepool	8	2	0	10
47	(England) Gary Moore	Southend United	8	0	2	10

== Attendances ==
=== Division One ===
No.	Club	Average	±	Highest	Lowest
1	Manchester United	49,862	-2.6%	59,879	26,582
2	Everton FC	49,531	7.8%	58,523	42,510
3	Liverpool FC	43,567	-8.0%	54,496	29,548
4	Chelsea FC	40,342	7.3%	61,479	24,904
5	Newcastle United FC	37,553	10.4%	56,317	19,411
6	Tottenham Hotspur FC	36,060	-3.7%	50,474	27,693
7	Derby County FC	35,924	29.9%	41,826	29,451
8	Arsenal FC	35,758	-6.9%	59,489	21,165
9	Leeds United FC	34,613	-6.4%	46,770	22,932
10	Manchester City FC	33,930	0.5%	63,013	22,006
11	Coventry City FC	32,043	-3.6%	43,446	24,590
12	Wolverhampton Wanderers FC	31,164	1.5%	50,783	20,594
13	West Ham United FC	30,530	-1.9%	41,643	20,934
14	Crystal Palace FC	29,901	50.5%	49,498	16,821
15	West Bromwich Albion FC	27,877	11.1%	45,120	18,512
16	Sheffield Wednesday FC	26,401	-1.7%	44,332	16,644
17	Nottingham Forest FC	25,408	2.0%	42,074	10,589
18	Stoke City FC	24,165	27.3%	38,917	11,810
19	Southampton FC	22,901	1.8%	31,044	19,130
20	Sunderland AFC	21,790	-12.7%	51,950	12,739
21	Ipswich Town FC	20,715	-12.2%	29,755	16,146
22	Burnley FC	16,452	2.4%	28,141	11,166

=== Division Two ===
No.	Club	Average	±	Highest	Lowest
1	Aston Villa FC	27,345	10.9%	54,405	18,840
2	Leicester City FC	25,104	-11.7%	35,168	16,059
3	Birmingham City FC	25,004	-4.2%	41,696	13,530
4	Cardiff City FC	21,502	27.5%	30,048	8,423
5	Swindon Town FC	20,075	11.2%	28,754	10,716
6	Middlesbrough FC	19,856	-5.7%	29,703	13,859
7	Sheffield United FC	17,840	15.2%	25,724	10,535
8	Huddersfield Town AFC	17,526	72.4%	30,907	10,206
9	Queens Park Rangers FC	17,525	-18.8%	22,799	11,017
10	Watford FC	17,223	26.9%	27,968	10,091
11	Bristol City FC	16,274	5.2%	24,905	10,698
12	Blackpool FC	15,695	3.8%	24,432	9,766
13	Portsmouth FC	14,928	-22.1%	22,169	10,464
14	Preston North End FC	13,548	2.5%	35,400	8,012
15	Norwich City FC	13,215	-3.9%	20,040	6,523
16	Charlton Athletic FC	12,693	-29.4%	21,757	7,644
17	Blackburn Rovers FC	12,523	18.0%	17,393	7,339
18	Millwall FC	11,668	-24.2%	20,451	7,825
19	Hull City AFC	11,230	-21.0%	17,434	7,474
20	Oxford United FC	10,812	-7.1%	16,821	7,406
21	Bolton Wanderers FC	10,041	-4.7%	18,032	6,757
22	Carlisle United FC	9,388	1.9%	14,481	6,214

=== Division Three ===
No.	Club	Average	±	Highest	Lowest
1	Luton Town FC	14,808	-0.6%	18,065	11,368
2	Brighton & Hove Albion FC	14,711	35.7%	32,032	5,643
3	Bristol Rovers FC	11,870	66.8%	22,001	5,978
4	Leyton Orient FC	11,369	101.0%	19,861	4,593
5	Fulham FC	10,259	-27.9%	18,987	6,675
6	Barnsley FC	10,234	8.2%	17,395	5,842
7	Reading FC	9,855	50.4%	18,929	5,029
8	Plymouth Argyle FC	9,113	-14.0%	17,128	4,854
9	Bradford City AFC	8,852	22.7%	16,224	4,148
10	Doncaster Rovers FC	8,560	-16.2%	19,742	3,196
11	Rotherham United FC	8,294	-8.6%	13,909	5,300
12	Mansfield Town FC	7,143	1.3%	10,322	4,588
13	Torquay United FC	6,884	-16.9%	11,099	3,766
14	Rochdale AFC	6,109	13.1%	9,752	3,604
15	Walsall FC	5,428	-7.5%	7,557	3,366
16	AFC Bournemouth	5,410	-28.5%	9,578	2,353
17	Gillingham FC	5,401	0.3%	8,638	3,930
18	Halifax Town AFC	4,674	-17.6%	10,274	1,812
19	Bury FC	4,512	-41.9%	9,849	2,931
20	Tranmere Rovers	4,393	-27.3%	7,192	2,906
21	Shrewsbury Town FC	4,291	-22.2%	6,587	3,350
22	Barrow AFC	3,649	-22.0%	5,665	2,128
23	Stockport County FC	3,506	-51.1%	5,338	1,783
24	Southport FC	3,428	-18.2%	5,834	2,088

=== Division Four ===
No.	Club	Average	±	Highest	Lowest
1	Wrexham AFC	9,902	76.7%	19,946	6,578
2	Chesterfield FC	9,886	95.3%	16,395	3,997
3	Swansea City AFC	8,410	48.6%	14,075	5,009
4	Brentford FC	7,773	21.1%	12,261	4,383
5	Port Vale FC	6,894	58.1%	12,538	3,955
6	Southend United FC	6,351	-39.8%	11,826	3,043
7	Peterborough United FC	6,109	8.7%	8,557	3,844
8	Aldershot Town FC	6,101	3.7%	8,790	4,062
9	Lincoln City FC	6,070	-23.3%	9,296	3,407
10	Notts County FC	5,779	21.0%	15,346	2,456
11	Northampton Town FC	5,594	-17.6%	12,972	2,979
12	Exeter City FC	4,920	-8.4%	6,707	3,538
13	Colchester United FC	4,643	-26.0%	7,133	2,571
14	Chester City FC	4,487	-23.6%	15,024	1,691
15	Scunthorpe United FC	4,424	21.4%	7,340	2,790
16	Grimsby Town FC	4,423	11.0%	7,801	2,393
17	Oldham Athletic FC	4,357	12.8%	6,083	2,391
18	York City FC	4,274	10.1%	7,212	2,237
19	Crewe Alexandra FC	3,345	-30.4%	7,155	2,297
20	Bradford Park Avenue AFC	3,137	-4.1%	5,997	1,864
21	Newport County AFC	2,755	12.2%	5,807	998
22	Darlington FC	2,744	-55.5%	4,604	1,717
23	Hartlepool United FC	2,563	-39.0%	3,627	1,473
24	Workington AFC	2,123	-10.4%	3,706	1,342

== See also ==
- 1969-70 in English football
