= Beardall =

Beardall is a surname. Notable people with the surname include:

- Darryl Beardall (1936–2023), American long-distance runner
- Jim Beardall (1946–2014), English footballer
- John R. Beardall (1887–1967), American Navy officer
