= List of annual foot races in California =

List of annual foot races held in California, sorted by region:

== Anaheim, California ==
- Disneyland 1/2 Marathon, 10k, 5k
- Tinker Bell 1/2 Marathon, 10k, 5k
- garbage Super Heroes 1/2 Marathon, 10k, 5k

== Arcadia, California ==
- Santa Anita Derby Day 5K

== Avery, California ==
- Hernia Hill 1/2 Marathon, 10K, 5K

== Big Sur, California ==
- Big Sur International Marathon

== Carlsbad, California ==
- Carlsbad 5000

== Cool, California ==
- Way Too Cool 50K, 10 Mile
- Cool Moon 100 Mile, 100K, 50 Mile, 25 Mile, Half Marathon, 11.5 Mile, 5K

== Davis, California ==
- Fleet Feet Davis Mile
- Fleet Feet Labor Day Races 10K, 5K
- Davis Stampede 1/2 Marathon, 10K, 5K
- Davis Turkey Trot 10K, 5K

== Death Valley, California ==
- Badwater Ultramarathon
- Death Valley Trail Marathon, 30K

== Elk Grove, California ==
- Nutrition Fuels Fitness 10K, 5K

== Fresno, California ==
- Two Cities Marathon & Half, Ultra, and Relay

== Granite Bay, California ==
- Rio Del Lago 100 Mile

== Hermosa Beach, California ==
- Hermosa Beach Ironman

== Huntington Beach, California ==
- Surf City Marathon (formerly Pacific Shoreline)

== Idyllwild, California ==
- Idyllwild 5K/10K Run and Fitness Walk

== Long Beach, California ==
- Jet Blue Long Beach Marathon.

== Los Angeles, California ==
- Los Angeles Marathon
- Angeles Crest 100 Mile Endurance Run
- Bell-Jeff Invitational
- Palos Verdes Marathon
- New Year's Race 1/2 Marathon, 5k
- Hollywood Half Marathon, 10k, 5k
- Alive and Running for Suicide Prevention, 5k

== Mammoth Lakes, California ==
- Quake & Shake 1/2 Marathon, 10K

== Manhattan Beach, California ==
- Old Hometown Fair 10K

== Oceanside, California ==
- O'side Turkey Trot 5 Mile and 5K

== Paso Robles, California ==
- Wine Vine Run Half Marathon 5K
- Redding Marathon, Relay and 5k

== Redondo Beach, California ==
- Redondo Beach Super Bowl Sunday 10K/5K

== Sacramento, California ==
- California International Marathon
- Paul Reese Memorial Clarksburg Country Run
- Runnin’ for Rhett 10K, 5K

== San Diego, California ==
- America's Finest City 1/2 Marathon, 5K
- Rock 'n' Roll Marathon
- San Diego Mud Run
- Costume Party Run - 1/2 Marathon, 5K
- Surfing Madonna "Save The Ocean" (Last run in 2014)
- Awesome '80s Run 5K

== San Francisco Bay Area ==
=== Alameda County ===
Berkeley:

- Berkeley Half Marathon, 10K, 5K

Castro Valley:

- Dick Collins Firetrails 100K, 50 Mile, Marathon
- Eden Medical Center Run to the Lake 10K, 5K
- Skyline 50K

Oakland:

- The Town's Half Marathon, 5K
- Oakland Running Festival: Marathon, Half Marathon, 5K

=== Contra Costa County ===
Danville:

- Devil Mountain Run, 5K, 10K

Mount Diablo State Park:

- Mount Diablo Summer Trail Run 50K, 25K, 8K

San Ramon:

- Primo's Run for Education Half-Marathon, 5K

Walnut Creek:

- Forma Gym Turkey Trot, 5K, 10K

Lafayette:

- Lafayette Reservoir Run, 5K, 10K

=== Marin County ===
- Marin County Half Marathon, 10K & 5K
- Golden Gate Headlands Marathon, 1/2 Marathon, 7 Mile

Angel Island:

- Angel Island New Year's 8K, 16K, 25K, 50K

Mill Valley:

- Dipsea Race

Muir Beach:

- Tamalpa Headlands 50K

Sausalito:

- Miwok 100K Trail Race

Stinson Beach:

- Muir Woods Marathon, 25K, 7 Mile (canceled for 2021)
- Stinson Beach Marathon, 25K, 7 Mile

=== San Francisco ===
- Allstate Hot Chocolate 15k/5k
- Across the Bay 12K
- Bay to Breakers 12K
- Bridge to Bridge
- Coastal 5k & Festival
- Embarcadero 10K
- Golden Gate Park 10K
- Kaiser Permanente San Francisco 1/2 Marathon, 5K
- King Oscar Presidio Trails Run 5K/10K
- Mermaid San Francisco 5K/10K
- Mission Rock 5K
- Nike Women's Marathon
- Polo Field 5K
- Run For Arctic Awareness 10K
- Run Wild (formerly Run to the Far Side)
- San Francisco Marathon
- Statuto Race 8K
- Walt Stack 10K
- Windmill 10K

=== San Luis Obispo County ===
San Luis Obispo:

- San Luis Obispo Marathon, Half Marathon, and 5K
- Run For Music 5k/10k

Paso Robles:

- Wine Vine Run Half Marathon 5K

=== San Mateo County ===
Pacifica, California:

- Coastal 5k Family Fun Run & Festival

Pescadero:

- Artichoke 1/2 Marathon, 10K

San Mateo:

- President's Day Castaway 10K, 5K
- Laurel Family Fun Run, 5K

South San Francisco:

- Thanksgiving Fun Run & Stride, 5K

=== Santa Clara County ===
Cupertino:

- Stevens Creek 50K (last run in 2013)
- Stevens Creek Reservoir Run Half Marathon, 11K, Lollipop

Morgan Hill:

- Mushroom Mardi Gras Festival and Run (10K and 5K)

Mountain View:

- Mermaid Mountain View Run 5K,10K, Half Marathon
- Human Race 10K, 5K (cancelled as of 2009)

Palo Alto:

- Moonlight Run
- Skyline Ridge 1/2 Marathon, 10K

San Jose:

- Quicksilver 100K, 50K
- Silicon Valley Turkey Trot

=== Sonoma County ===
Jenner:

- Salt Point 50K, 26K, 11K

== Santa Clarita, California ==
- Santa Clarita Marathon, Half Marathon, and 5k
- College of the Canyons Cross Country Summer Series
- Independence Day 5k
- Fight It! 5k

== Santa Cruz, California ==
- Firecracker 5K/10K
- Mothers Day Run/Walk for Shelter
- Nisene Marks Marathon, ½ Marathon
- Race Thru The Redwoods
- Run by the Sea
- Santa Cruz ½ Marathon, 10K
- Surfer's Path 5K/10K
- Surfer's Path ½ Marathon, Marathon
- Surfer's Path Hang 10/5
- Superbowl Run
- Turkey Trot
- Wharf to Wharf

== Sierra Nevada, California ==
- Western States Endurance Run
- Lake Tahoe Marathon, ½ Marathon, 10k, 5k
- Broken Arrow Skyrace 46K, 23K, 18K, 11K, Vertical Kilometer

== South Lake Tahoe, California ==
- Lake Tahoe Marathon, ½ Marathon, 10k, 5k

== Ventura, California ==
- Twilight's Last Gleaming Cross Country Challenge 4 Miles
