= Derek Smith =

Derek Smith may refer to:

- Derek Ryan Smith, known as Mod Sun (born 1987), singer, rapper, and songwriter
- Derek Smith (basketball) (1961–1996), American NBA basketball player
- Derek Smith (footballer, born 1946), footballer for Tranmere Rovers
- Derek Smith (ice hockey, born 1954), Canadian former NHL ice hockey player
- Derek Smith (ice hockey, born 1984), Canadian ice hockey player
- Derek Smith (linebacker) (born 1975), American NFL linebacker
- Derek Smith (tight end) (born 1980), American NFL tight end
- Derek Smith (soccer) (born 1980), American soccer defender
- Derek Smith (musician) (1931–2016), British jazz pianist
- Derek Vincent Smith, known as Pretty Lights (born 1981), electronic music artist
- Derek Smith (television producer) (1927–2015), for the BBC
- Derek V. Smith, CEO of ChoicePoint

== See also ==
- Derrick Smith (disambiguation)
