= Redwood Highway Marathon =

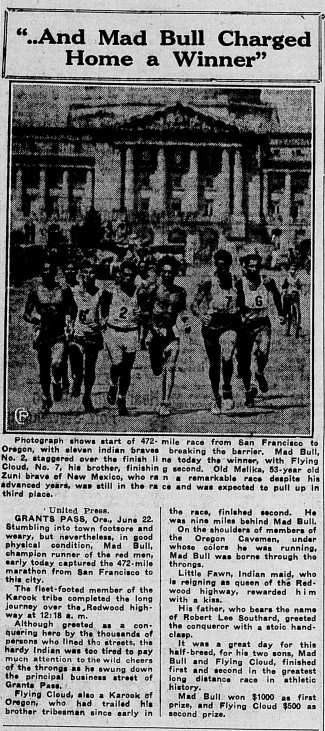
Start of 1927 Redwood Highway Marathon at San Francisco Civic Center

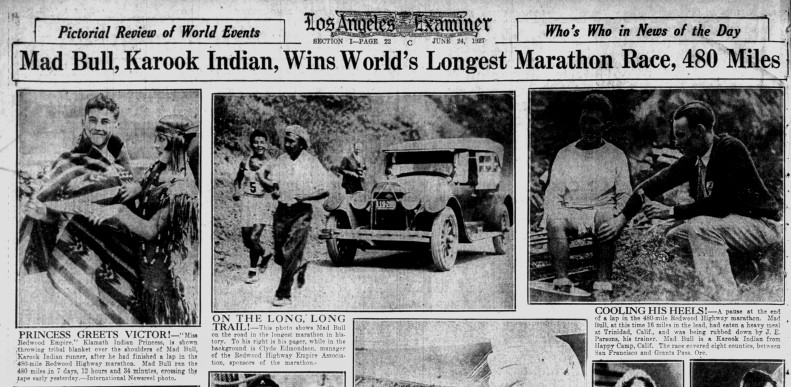
Mad Bull, Karook Indian, wins the 1927 Redwood Highway Marathon, World's Longest Race, 480 Miles.

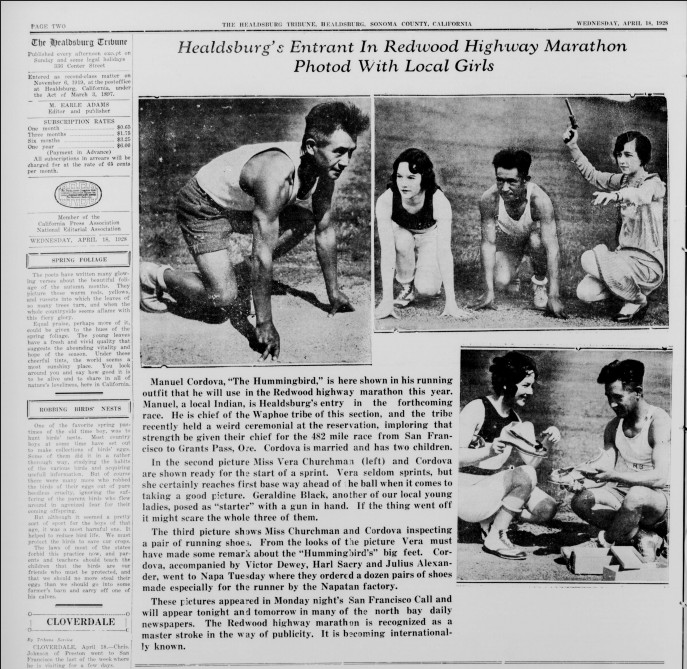
Healdsburg's Redwood Highway Marathon entrant, Manuel Cordova, "The Hummingbird," with local girls.

The Redwood Highway Marathon was a 480-mile (770 km) foot race created to promote the newly opened U.S. Highway 101 from Sausalito to Grants Pass, Oregon. It was the first official ultramarathon in U.S. history and inspired the 1928 Trans-American Bunion Derby held on Route 66.

== History ==
The race sparked local interest in running by establishing additional races such as the 1927 five-mile (8.0 km) Fitch Mountain Footrace (now a 10K), and a 1928 variation of the Napa Marathon, run 28 miles (45 km) from Napa, California city hall to Myrtleville.

The Redwood Highway Marathon was promoted as a competition for Indians, known for long-distance running endurance. "Mad Bull" won the race in 1927 after seven days, 12 hours and 34 minutes finishing at 12:18 a.m "Flying Cloud" took second place finishing at 8:40 a.m.

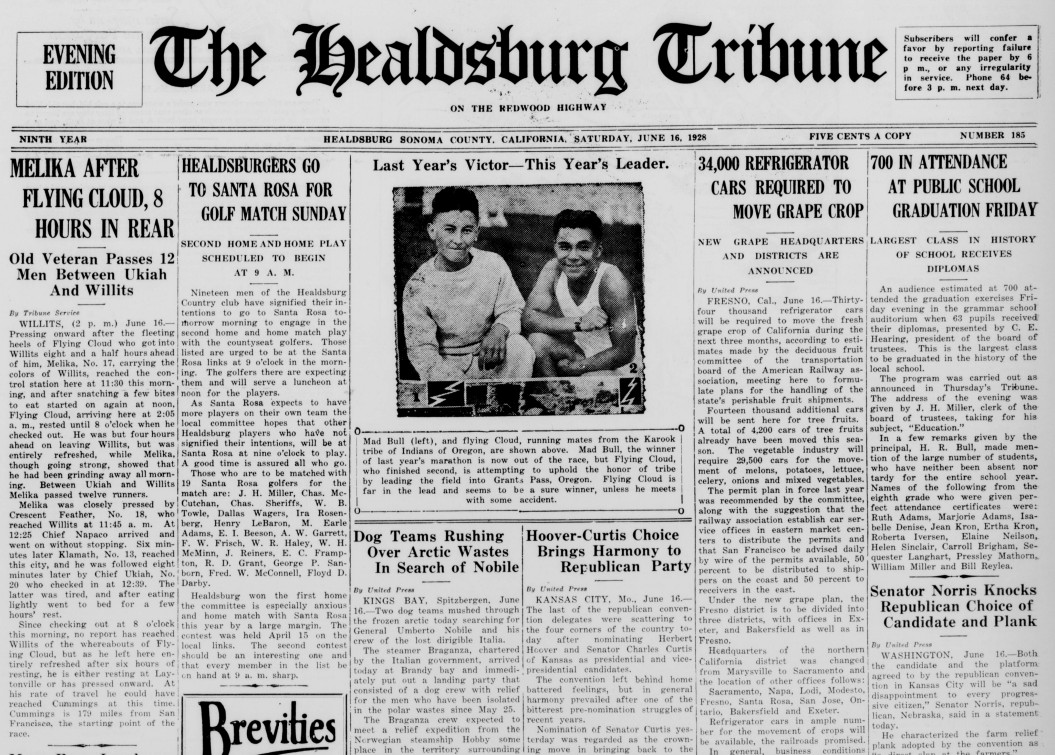
Mad Bull and Flying Cloud, 1928 Redwood Highway Marathon

In 1928, Manual Cordova, "Hummingbird" represented Healdsburg, Lake county was represented by "Klamath", Napa County by "Lutci", - "Melika"- Willits, "Jamon"- Marin county, "Bad Land Charlie" for Fortuna and "Flying Arrow" for Eureka, California.

In 1928, "Flying Cloud" won first place and $5000, with Melika, a 62-year-old Zuni runner from New Mexico taking second place close behind and awarded $2500. "Chief Ukiah" took third place and $1000. Flying Cloud's 1928 time for the 482 miles was 168 hours and 22 minutes, bettering the mark set in 1927 by Mad Bull by 13 hours. Mad Bull gave up the race at Crescent City. A third race was being planned for 1929, but with the stock market crash and onset of the Great Depression, it was cancelled and never run again.

== Route ==
The races started with a short run from the Civic Center, San Francisco to the ferry terminal and officially restarted at the Sausalito ferry landing once crossing the bay. With the Golden Gate Bridge still unfunded and unbuilt, the ferry was the only way across.

== Stereotyping of Native American participants ==
Race promoters felt some of the runner's birth names were too common and invented stereotypical fake “Indian names” to boost interest and spectators. Karuk runners Johnny Southard became "Mad Bull," and Henry Thomas became "Flying Cloud." Melika, a Zuni runner kept his real name. Manual Cordova, "Hummingbird," did not place in the Redwood Highway Marathon but won the inaugural 1927 Fitch Mountain Footrace. Hummingbird withdrew in Petaluma in the 1928 race due to an old knee injury.

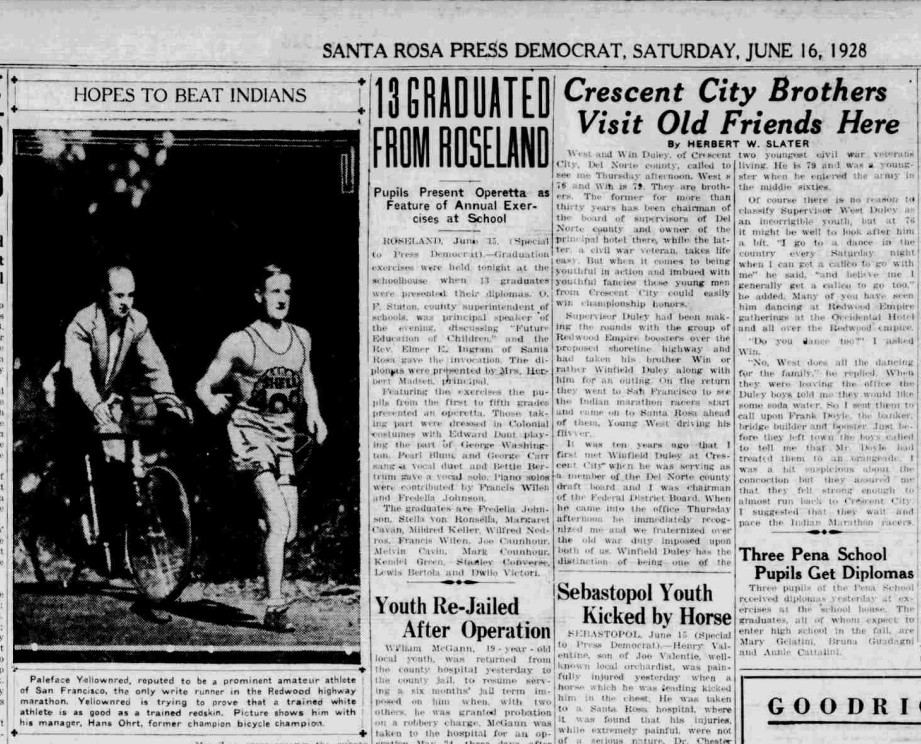
Paleface Yellownred hopes to beat Indians.

"Paleface Yellownred," reputed to be a prominent amateur athlete of San Francisco, was the only white runner in the 1928 Redwood Highway Marathon. Photographed wearing a Shell "400" yellow and red shirt and accompanied by his manager Hans Ohrt, a former champion bicycle racer, his birthname is unknown. Paleface Yellownred was accompanied by a service truck equipped with a shower bath, ice chest, bunks and lockers, to arrange rest and eating periods with the least loss of time.

Although the race exploited American Indian stereotypes, the prizes were significant for the runners. Mad Bull and Flying Cloud worked as hop pickers, with Mad Bull winning a hop picking championship in 1927.
