= 1969–70 in English football =

Football in England
- Season: 1969–70

Men's football
- First Division: Everton
- Second Division: Huddersfield Town
- Third Division: Orient
- Fourth Division: Chesterfield
- FA Cup: Chelsea
- League Cup: Manchester City
- Charity Shield: Leeds United

The 1969–70 season was the 90th season of competitive football in England.

== FA Cup ==
Chelsea won the cup by beating Leeds United 2–1 in a replay at Old Trafford after a 2–2 draw at Wembley Stadium. In the replay Leeds took the lead through Mick Jones before an equaliser from Peter Osgood forced the replay to extra-time. David Webb then scored the winner in the 104th minute to give Chelsea a first ever FA Cup triumph.

Manchester United beat Watford 2–0 at Highbury in the first ever third-place playoff, held the day before the final.

A number of non-league clubs made it to the Third Round i.e. Brentwood, Hillingdon Borough and South Shields as well as Sutton United who reached the Fourth Round before losing 6–0 to Leeds United.

George Best scored six goals for Manchester United in their 8–2 victory over Northampton Town in the Fifth Round. He received a match ball signed by all of the opposition players as a souvenir, and later donated it to the club's museum.

== League Cup ==
Manchester City won the League Cup by beating West Bromwich Albion 2–1 after extra time. Second Division Carlisle United enjoyed a run to the semifinals of the competition but lost to Albion. In the other semi Manchester City beat local rivals Manchester United.

== Star players ==
The FWA Footballer of the Year was awarded to Billy Bremner who was the outstanding player of the season despite the failure of Leeds to win any trophies. Jeff Astle of West Bromwich Albion finished the season as Division One top scorer by netting 25 goals. Albert Kinsey of Wrexham was overall league top-scorer, hitting 27 goals for the Fourth Division outfit.

== Star managers ==
- Legendary Everton manager Harry Catterick continued his run of success at the club with a league title.
- Dave Sexton led his Chelsea to an historic first ever win in the FA Cup.
- Joe Mercer continued his run of success with Manchester City by capturing the League Cup and the Cup Winners' Cup.
- Bertie Mee led his Arsenal side to a first ever European triumph and set the club up for their Double win the following season.

== National team ==
England took part in the 1970 FIFA World Cup, qualifying from their group after beating Romania and Czechoslovakia but losing to Brazil. The team then went out in the quarterfinals after losing 3–2 (after extra time) to West Germany. Preparations had been damaged after star defender Bobby Moore was arrested in Bogotá over later disproven allegations of theft.

== Honours ==
Competition	Winner	Runner-up
First Division	Everton (7*)	Leeds United
Second Division	Huddersfield Town	Blackpool
Third Division	Orient	Luton Town
Fourth Division	Chesterfield	Wrexham
FA Cup	Chelsea (1)	Leeds United
League Cup	Manchester City (1)	West Bromwich Albion
Charity Shield	Leeds United	Manchester City
Home Championship	England, Scotland & Wales	

Notes = Number in parentheses is the times that club has won that honour. * indicates new record for competition

== Football League ==
=== First Division ===
Everton, one of the English game's dominant forces during the 1960s, had a strong start to the 1970s as league champions by a nine-point margin ahead of runners-up Leeds United, who had gone into the final stages of the season in contention for three major trophies but had failed to win any of them. They were beaten in an FA Cup final replay by Chelsea, who lifted the trophy for the first time in a season where they finished third. Derby County's return to the First Division after many years away saw them finish an impressive fourth under the management of Brian Clough. Liverpool completed the top five, while Coventry City recorded their best finish yet by finishing sixth under the management of former Manchester United captain Noel Cantwell.

Manchester United finished eighth under their new manager Wilf McGuinness, who had succeeded the retiring Sir Matt Busby in the close season.

Manchester City managed only a mid table finish but lifted the League Cup and the European Cup Winners' Cup.

Sheffield Wednesday and Sunderland finished the season relegated.

Pos	Team	Pld	W	D	L	GF	GA	GAv	Pts	Qualification or relegation
1	Everton (C)	42	29	8	5	72	34	2.118	66	Qualification for the European Cup first round
2	Leeds United	42	21	15	6	84	49	1.714	57	Qualification for the Inter-Cities Fairs Cup first round
3	Chelsea	42	21	13	8	70	50	1.400	55	Qualification for the Cup Winners' Cup first round (Note: Chelsea qualified for the Cup Winners' Cup first round as the 1969–70 FA Cup winners.)
4	Derby County	42	22	9	11	64	37	1.730	53	Qualification for the Watney Cup (Note: Derby County and Manchester United qualified for the Watney Cup as the two teams with the most goals that hadn't already qualified for a European competition.)
5	Liverpool	42	20	11	11	65	42	1.548	51	Qualification for the Inter-Cities Fairs Cup first round
6	Coventry City	42	19	11	12	58	48	1.208	49	Qualification for the Inter-Cities Fairs Cup first round
7	Newcastle United	42	17	13	12	57	35	1.629	47	Qualification for the Inter-Cities Fairs Cup first round
8	Manchester United	42	14	17	11	66	61	1.082	45	Qualification for the Watney Cup
9	Stoke City	42	15	15	12	56	52	1.077	45	
10	Manchester City	42	16	11	15	55	48	1.146	43	Qualification for the Cup Winners' Cup first round (Note: Manchester City qualified for the Cup Winners' Cup first round as the 1969–70 European Cup Winners' Cup winners.)
11	Tottenham Hotspur	42	17	9	16	54	55	0.982	43	
12	Arsenal	42	12	18	12	51	49	1.041	42	Qualification for the Inter-Cities Fairs Cup first round
13	Wolverhampton Wanderers	42	12	16	14	55	57	0.965	40	
14	Burnley	42	12	15	15	56	61	0.918	39	
15	Nottingham Forest	42	10	18	14	50	71	0.704	38	
16	West Bromwich Albion	42	14	9	19	58	66	0.879	37	
17	West Ham United	42	12	12	18	51	60	0.850	36	
18	Ipswich Town	42	10	11	21	40	63	0.635	31	
19	Southampton	42	6	17	19	46	67	0.687	29	
20	Crystal Palace	42	6	15	21	34	68	0.500	27	
21	Sunderland (R)	42	6	14	22	30	68	0.441	26	Relegation to the Second Division
22	Sheffield Wednesday (R)	42	8	9	25	40	71	0.563	25	Relegation to the Second Division

Source: World Football
Rules for classification: 1) Points; 2) Goal average; 3) Goals scored
(C) Champions; (R) Relegated

=== Second Division ===
Huddersfield Town clinched the Second Division title by a comfortable margin to secure their return to the First Division, and were joined by Blackpool as runners-up. Leicester City just missed out on an immediate return to the First Division, while Middlesbrough's recent upturn in fortunes meant that they came just three points short of ending their lengthy absence from the top flight. Swindon Town, the previous season's surprise winners of the League Cup, recorded their best finish yet by finishing fifth in the Second Division.

Aston Villa and Preston North End, two clubs with illustrious histories and a host of major trophies between them, went down to the Third Division for the first time. Watford, a side with a much more modest history, won their battle against relegation but most impressively reached the semi-finals of the FA Cup.

Pos	Team	Pld	W	D	L	GF	GA	GAv	Pts	Qualification or relegation
1	Huddersfield Town (C, P)	42	24	12	6	68	37	1.838	60	Promotion to the First Division
2	Blackpool (P)	42	20	13	9	56	45	1.244	53	Promotion to the First Division
3	Leicester City	42	19	13	10	64	50	1.280	51	
4	Middlesbrough	42	20	10	12	55	45	1.222	50	
5	Swindon Town	42	17	16	9	57	47	1.213	50	
6	Sheffield United	42	22	5	15	73	38	1.921	49	Qualification for the Watney Cup (Note: Sheffield United and Hull City qualified for the Watney Cup as the two teams with the most goals that hadn't already qualified for promotion or a European competition.)
7	Cardiff City	42	18	13	11	61	41	1.488	49	Qualification for the Cup Winners' Cup first round (Note: Cardiff City qualified for the European Cup Winners' Cup as the 1969-70 Welsh Cup winners.)
8	Blackburn Rovers	42	20	7	15	54	50	1.080	47	
9	Queens Park Rangers	42	17	11	14	66	57	1.158	45	
10	Millwall	42	15	14	13	56	56	1.000	44	
11	Norwich City	42	16	11	15	49	46	1.065	43	
12	Carlisle United	42	14	13	15	58	56	1.036	41	
13	Hull City	42	15	11	16	72	70	1.029	41	Qualification for the Watney Cup
14	Bristol City	42	13	13	16	54	50	1.080	39	
15	Oxford United	42	12	15	15	35	42	0.833	39	
16	Bolton Wanderers	42	12	12	18	54	61	0.885	36	
17	Portsmouth	42	13	9	20	66	80	0.825	35	
18	Birmingham City	42	11	11	20	51	78	0.654	33	
19	Watford	42	9	13	20	44	57	0.772	31	
20	Charlton Athletic	42	7	17	18	35	76	0.461	31	
21	Aston Villa (R)	42	8	13	21	36	62	0.581	29	Relegation to the Third Division
22	Preston North End (R)	42	8	12	22	43	63	0.683	28	Relegation to the Third Division

Rules for classification: 1) Points; 2) Goal average; 3) Goals scored
(C) Champions; (P) Promoted; (R) Relegated

=== Third Division ===
Orient and Luton Town advanced from the Third Division as champions and runners-up respectively.

Stockport County, Barrow, Southport and Bournemouth & Boscombe Athletic went down to the Fourth Division.

Pos	Team	Pld	W	D	L	GF	GA	GAv	Pts	Promotion or relegation
1	Orient (C, P)	46	25	12	9	67	36	1.861	62	Promotion to the Second Division
2	Luton Town (P)	46	23	14	9	77	43	1.791	60	Promotion to the Second Division
3	Bristol Rovers	46	20	16	10	80	59	1.356	56	
4	Fulham	46	20	15	11	81	55	1.473	55	Qualified for the Watney Cup (Note: The two teams who scored the most goals in each division, and did not qualify for Europe and were not promoted, qualified for the Watney Cup.)
5	Brighton & Hove Albion	46	23	9	14	57	43	1.326	55	
6	Mansfield Town	46	21	11	14	70	49	1.429	53	
7	Barnsley	46	19	15	12	68	59	1.153	53	
8	Reading	46	21	11	14	87	77	1.130	53	Qualified for the Watney Cup
9	Rochdale	46	18	10	18	69	60	1.150	46	
10	Bradford City	46	17	12	17	57	50	1.140	46	
11	Doncaster Rovers	46	17	12	17	52	54	0.963	46	
12	Walsall	46	17	12	17	54	67	0.806	46	
13	Torquay United	46	14	17	15	62	59	1.051	45	
14	Rotherham United	46	15	14	17	62	54	1.148	44	
15	Shrewsbury Town	46	13	18	15	62	63	0.984	44	
16	Tranmere Rovers	46	14	16	16	56	72	0.778	44	
17	Plymouth Argyle	46	16	11	19	56	64	0.875	43	
18	Halifax Town	46	14	15	17	47	63	0.746	43	
19	Bury	46	15	11	20	75	80	0.938	41	
20	Gillingham	46	13	13	20	52	64	0.813	39	
21	Bournemouth & Boscombe Athletic (R)	46	12	15	19	48	71	0.676	39	Relegation to the Fourth Division
22	Southport (R)	46	14	10	22	48	66	0.727	38	Relegation to the Fourth Division
23	Barrow (R)	46	8	14	24	46	81	0.568	30	Relegation to the Fourth Division
24	Stockport County (R)	46	6	11	29	27	71	0.380	23	Relegation to the Fourth Division

(C) Champions; (P) Promoted; (R) Relegated

=== Fourth Division ===
Chesterfield climbed out of the Fourth Division as champions, proceeding along with Wrexham, Swansea City and Port Vale.

Bradford Park Avenue were voted out of the Football League and replaced by Cambridge United. In February, Swansea Town were renamed Swansea City after Swansea received city status.

Pos	Team	Pld	W	D	L	GF	GA	GAv	Pts	Promotion or relegation
1	Chesterfield (C, P)	46	27	10	9	77	32	2.406	64	Promotion to the Third Division
2	Wrexham (P)	46	26	9	11	84	49	1.714	61	Promotion to the Third Division
3	Swansea City (P)	46	21	18	7	66	45	1.467	60	Promotion to the Third Division
4	Port Vale (P)	46	20	19	7	61	33	1.848	59	Promotion to the Third Division
5	Brentford	46	20	16	10	58	39	1.487	56	
6	Aldershot	46	20	13	13	78	65	1.200	53	Qualified for the Watney Cup (Note: The two teams who scored the most goals in each division, and did not qualify for Europe and were not promoted, qualified for the Watney Cup.)
7	Notts County	46	22	8	16	73	62	1.177	52	
8	Lincoln City	46	17	16	13	66	52	1.269	50	
9	Peterborough United	46	17	14	15	77	69	1.116	48	Qualified for the Watney Cup
10	Colchester United	46	17	14	15	64	63	1.016	48	
11	Chester	46	21	6	19	58	66	0.879	48	
12	Scunthorpe United	46	18	10	18	67	65	1.031	46	
13	York City	46	16	14	16	55	62	0.887	46	
14	Northampton Town	46	16	12	18	64	55	1.164	44	
15	Crewe Alexandra	46	16	12	18	51	51	1.000	44	
16	Grimsby Town	46	14	15	17	54	58	0.931	43	
17	Southend United	46	15	10	21	59	85	0.694	40	
18	Exeter City	46	14	11	21	57	59	0.966	39	
19	Oldham Athletic	46	13	13	20	60	65	0.923	39	
20	Workington	46	12	14	20	46	64	0.719	38	
21	Newport County	46	13	11	22	53	74	0.716	37	Re-elected
22	Darlington	46	13	10	23	53	73	0.726	36	Re-elected
23	Hartlepool	46	10	10	26	42	82	0.512	30	Re-elected
24	Bradford (Park Avenue) (R)	46	6	11	29	41	96	0.427	23	Failed re-election and demoted to the Northern Premier League

Source: rsssf.com
(C) Champions; (P) Promoted; (R) Relegated

=== Top goalscorers ===
First Division

- Jeff Astle (West Bromwich Albion) – 25 goals

Second Division

- John Hickton (Middlesbrough) – 24 goals

Third Division

- George Jones (Bury) – 26 goals

Fourth Division

- Albert Kinsey (Wrexham) – 27 goals

== European football ==
Arsenal won the Inter Cities Fairs Cup final, beating R.S.C. Anderlecht 4–3 on aggregate. Manchester City won the UEFA Cup Winners' Cup final, defeating Górnik Zabrze of Poland 2–1 at the Prater Stadium in Vienna to complete a double triumph. Leeds United reached the semi-final of the European Cup, but lost 3–1 on aggregate to Scottish champions Celtic.
