= Boitano =

Boitano is a surname. Notable people with the surname include:

- Brian Boitano (born 1963), American figure skater
- Dan Boitano (born 1953), American baseball player
- Mark Boitano (born 1953), American politician and real estate agent
- Mary Etta Boitano (born 1963), American marathon runner
