= Clipper Smith =

"Clipper" Smith may refer to:

- Maurice J. "Clipper" Smith (1898–1984), coach at Gonzaga, Santa Clara, Villanova, San Francisco, and Lafayette and for the Boston Yanks of the NFL
- John "Clipper" Smith (1904–1973), coach at Duquesne and North Carolina State; member of the College Football Hall of Fame
- Leland "Clipper" Smith (d. 1979), American long-distance runner
