= Derrick Smith =

Derrick Smith may refer to:

- Derrick Smith (ice hockey) (born 1965), Canadian NHL centre
- Derrick Smith (soccer) (born 1991), US Virgin Islands international soccer player
- Derrick Smith (politician), American politician from Illinois
- Derrick C. Smith (born 1943), Jamaican politician

== See also ==
- Derek Smith (disambiguation)
