= Clipper Smith (runner) =

American long-distance runner (1913–1979)

Personal information
- Born: January 14, 1913 Oakdale, California, US
- Died: May 1, 1979 Van Nuys, California, US

Sport
- Sport: Long-distance running
- Events: Dipsea Race; Petaluma Spartan Marathon; Fitch Mountain Footrace; Bay to Breakers

Leland "Clipper" Smith (January 14, 1913 — May 1, 1979) was an American long-distance runner. After being adopted at age seven from a San Francisco orphanage by a Healdsburg couple, he won the Healdsburg Fitch Mountain Footrace in 1931 as a high school student. Clipper won the inaugural 1935 Petaluma Spartan Marathon, a qualifying race for the Berlin Olympics. Clipper won the Petaluma marathon five additional times. He ran some fifty thousand miles and collected 95 trophies and 50 medals by 1945. Clipper only failed to place in three of the 106 marathons that he had entered by 1945. He was reported to held the world record for the marathon, establishing a time of 2:47:22 at the 1938 Petaluma Spartan Marathon "smashing a 1932 Olympic mark." Smith broke the Petaluma marathon record in 1943 with a time of 2 hours 32 minutes. A conflicting report put the 1943 time at 2 hours, 47 minutes, 20 seconds, and 1938 time at 2 hours, 51 minutes, 21 seconds—course records, but not besting the 1932 Olympic marathon time of 2:31:36. Clipper won the 1938 San Francisco cross city race, now known as the Bay to Breakers.

Smith held the Amateur Athletic Union's Far Western marathon championship for eight years.

== Olympics ==
Smith competed in several Olympic tryouts, the 1936 Berlin Olympics, the 1940 Tokyo Olympics, and the 1944 London Olympics. He was "favored as the United States chief hope in the Olympic games of 1940", originally scheduled in Tokyo but cancelled due to the escalating Sino-Japanese War. The games were rescheduled to Finland and ultimately cancelled due to WWII. Smith also qualified for the 1944 London Olympics which were similarly cancelled. In 1945, Smith was training for the 1948 Olympics running six to eighteen miles everyday and bicycling to his job.

Chris Jennings, a Healdsburg department store worker, was Clipper's trainer for many years.

== Career ==
Smith served in the Coast Guard during WWII at Moffett Federal Airfield. After the war he worked as a laundry routeman in Van Nuys, California.
