= Dipsea Trail =

- The Dipsea Trail
- U.S. National Register of Historic Places
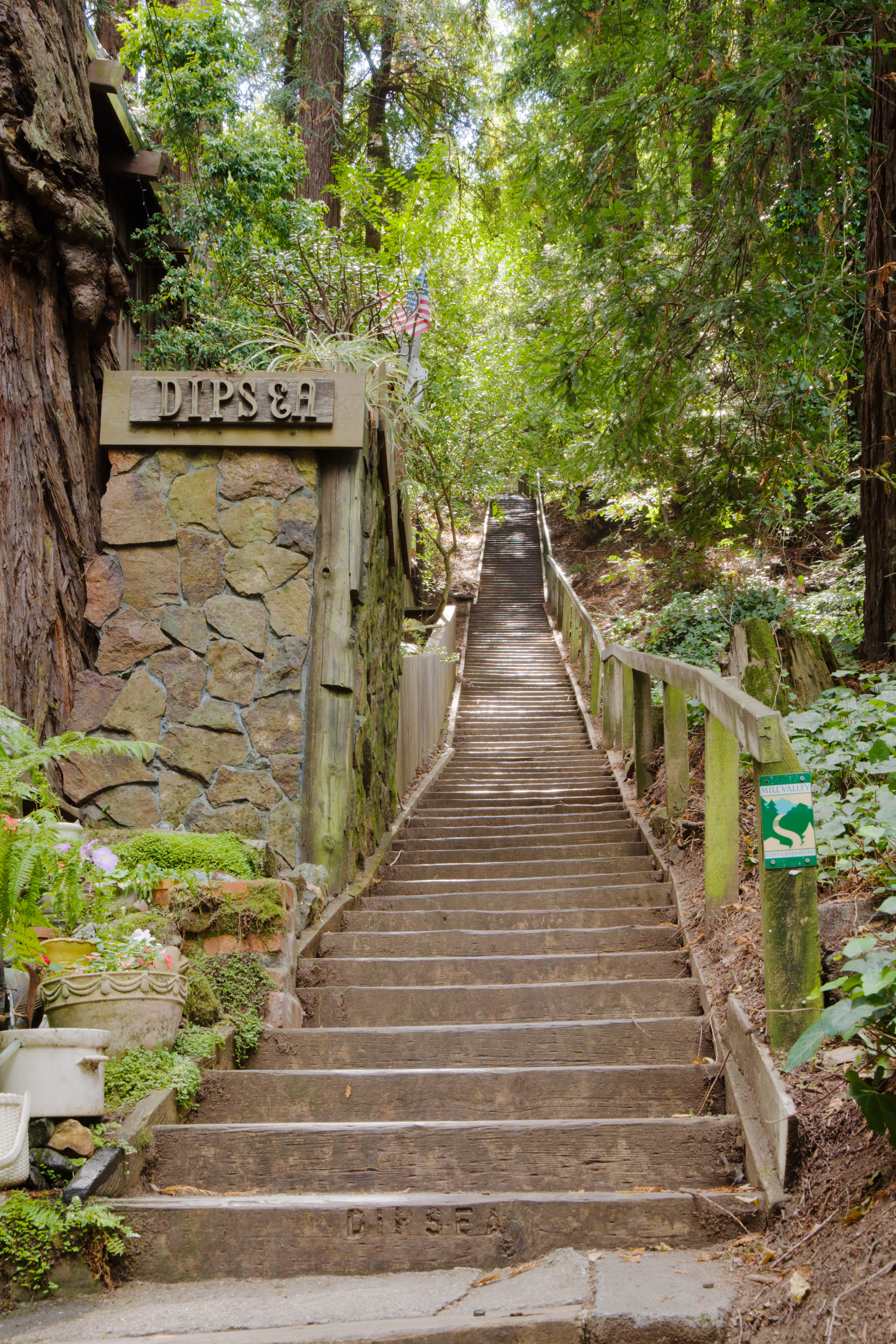
- Dipsea Trail stairs in Mill Valley

- Location within California
- Location: Throckmorton Avenue, Sequoia Valley Road, Panoramic Highway, State Route 1, Muir Woods National Monument, Golden Gate National Recreation Area, including in Mill Valley and Stinson Beach
- Coordinates: 37.904839°N 122.554491°W
- Area: 7 acres (2.8 ha)
- Built: 1904
- NRHP reference No.: 10000356
- Added to NRHP: June 4, 2010

The Dipsea Trail, in Marin County, California, is the route of the annual Dipsea Race. The trail itself is approximately 7.5 miles (12.1 km) long, running from Mill Valley up and over a ridge and down to the Pacific Ocean at Stinson Beach. Runners in the race are not restricted to follow just one pathway; especially towards the endpoint some runners diverge along less traveled paths which they may have practiced and deem advantageous. For the majority of the route, almost all competitors follow one main path which climbs and descends stairways and is otherwise well-defined.

The trail crosses land owned by multiple parties including the National Park Service, the State of California, Marin County, the City of Mill Valley, and the Flying Y Homeowners Association. The trail begins with a climb of approximately 688 stairs.

It was listed on the National Register of Historic Places in 2010. The National Register nomination was written by a D.S. Livingston, of the Dipsea Trail Foundation. It is listed as having 7 acres (2.8 ha) in area, which is an estimate calculated as 7.44 miles x average 8’ width = 314,265 sq.ft. = 7 acres.

The trail was deemed significant as representing "the founding footrace that laid the groundwork for a long Bay Area tradition that linked community with fitness and civic wellbeing". The first Dipsea is credited with having started a trend of "spirited" footracing, including San Francisco’s 7.46-mile Cross City Race in 1912 which evolved to become the much-better-known-now Bay to Breakers race. The Statuto Race, started in 1919, is another.

D.S. Livingston wrote in 2010:

These spirited footraces were created to bring residents together through events that inspired cooperation, community pride, and personal health. Intending to inspire San Francisco residents following the 1906 earthquake, city leaders created the Cross City Race, which was first run on January 1, 1912. Mimicking the Dipsea Race, the runners started at the San Francisco Bayside of the city and ran over hilly streets to end at the Pacific Ocean. The race grew in popularity and in 1964 the name was changed to the Bay to Breakers. Today it is one of the largest footraces in the world with over 65,000 participants (a record 110,000 people entered in 1986) and more than 100,000 spectators. While the Bay to Breakers differs from the Dipsea in that it is run entirely on city streets and now tends to be as much a spectacle of costumes and revelry as a competition for serious runners, the historical ties are strong and many runners have competed and continue to compete in both. An Italian athletic and social club, Unione Sportiva Italiana, sponsored the first Statuto Race in 1919. The annual footrace across city streets energized the North Beach community, largely composed of Italian immigrants looking for a better life in America. The club’s activism in community improvement included not only the footrace and other sports but also culture and community service. The Statuto footrace is now among the oldest footraces in the United States. Elsewhere in the San Francisco Bay Area, traditional races include the 9-mile Dick Houston Memorial Woodminster Cross Country Race (1965) and the Kenwood Foot Race (1971). The Woodminster race in the Oakland hills is, like the Dipsea race, a challenging run through mountainous terrain on dirt trails, although runners do not run on streets like the Dipsea. It is also an age and gender handicapped race. The Kenwood Foot Race has been held on the Fourth of July for almost four decades and offers two courses (10 km and 3 km) through countryside hills on rural roads. These races, founded during the fitness boom of the 1960s and 1970s, mimic the Dipsea Race in style and dedicate the events in the spirit of civic and cultural improvement. At the time of this nomination, there are dozens of rural and urban footraces held throughout the year in the area, many of which raise funds for causes or merely promote competition and personal health. The Dipsea Race was the founding footrace that laid the groundwork for a long Bay Area tradition that linked community with fitness and civic wellbeing."

The race organization provides a "turn by turn" presentation of the course on a webpage with about 70 photos in sequence.

The term "Dipsea Trail" is used sometimes to describe portions of the race trail or hikes one can take that partway go along it. For example, AllTrails lists a version of it as a 9.7 miles (15.6 km) out-and-back trail.
