= Fitch Mountain Footrace =

American running competition

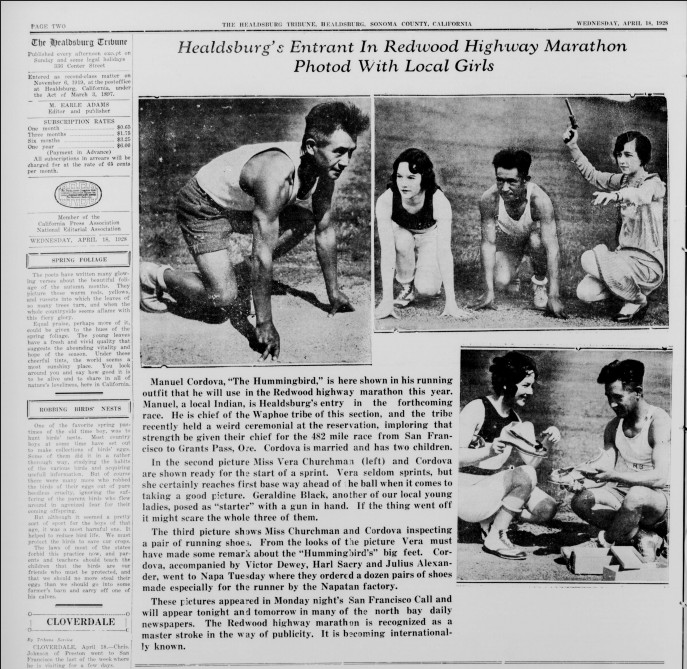
Healdsburg's Redwood Highway Marathon entrant Manuel Cordova, "The Hummingbird," a local Washoe Indian, won the inaugural race.

The Fitch Mountain Footrace is an American running competition, held since 1927. Originally 5.6-miles long, 5.5-miles long in 1975, and a half-marathon in 1976. It is currently a 10K race. Manuel Cordova, "The Hummingbird", a local Wappo Indian, won the inaugural race with a time of 35 minutes and 22 seconds. The race was originally organized to select Healdsburg, California's entrant in the 1927 Redwood Highway Marathon, a 480-mile multi-day race from Sausalito, California at the San Francisco ferry terminal to Grants Pass, Oregon.

Clipper Smith set a course record of 33 minutes and 47 seconds in 1938.

The race was often sanctioned by the Amateur Athletic Union. The race became a 10K with a four-mile short course in 1980.
