= Darryl Beardall =

American long-distance runner (1936–2023)

Personal information
- Born: October 26, 1936 Utah, US
- Died: November 6, 2023 (aged 87) Santa Rosa, California, US
- Education: Brigham Young University
- Occupation(s): Mail carrier, telegraphist
- Spouse: Lynne Tanner

Sport
- Sport: Long-distance running
- Events: Dipsea Race; Napa Valley Marathon; Deseret News Marathon; Petaluma Spartan Marathon

Darryl Beardall (October 26, 1936 — November 6, 2023) was an American long-distance runner. In his lifetime, he ran about 300,000 miles, the most in recorded history.

== Early and personal life ==
Beardall was born to Ila and Ray Beardall, the oldest of five children, in Utah on October 26, 1936, and moved the Santa Rosa, California at age 13. He competed in track and field in Santa Rosa High School, and was given a scholarship to Brigham Young University. He met his wife Lynne Tanner at the finish line of the Dipsea Race. They were married for more than forty years, having five children together.

== Career ==
Beardall worked as postal carrier, then as a telegraphist worked for thirty year for the Northwestern Pacific Railroad. He ran his first marathon in 1959, winning a trophy at the Petaluma Spartan Marathon. That year, the United States Army diagnosed him with cardiomegaly. He kept running anyway. He ran twelve miles a day, daily, for sixty-five years. He broke his hip in 2016. In July 2022, he walked ten kilometers of the Deseret News Marathon with a walker.

He competed fifty-five times in the Dipsea Race, thirty-two times in the Napa Valley Marathon and forty times in the Deseret News Marathon. In 2013, Amby Burfoot calculated that Beardall ran about 280,000 miles in his lifetime, the most he could find.

== Death ==
Beardall died of bladder cancer on November 6, 2023, in Santa Rosa, California, aged 87. He was inducted into the Dipsea Race Hall of Fame.
