= Napa Valley Marathon =

Marathon in California, US

- Date: March
- Location: Napa County, CA
- Event type: Road
- Distance: Marathon, Half Marathon, and 5k
- Established: 1979
- Website: https://napavalleymarathon.org/

The Napa Valley Marathon is an annual marathon, half marathon, and 5K in Napa County, California. The USATF-certified marathon course begins in Calistoga at the northwestern tip of Napa County, and then traverses the Silverado Trail, ending in downtown Napa. The race's course is primarily rolling hills or flat as it moves through rural California Wine Country. The Napa Valley Marathon has been run in March since 1979, accepts only about 3,000 runners, and is widely considered one of the most scenic marathons in the United States. The men's and women's winners of the race win their weight in wine.

== List of marathon winners ==
| Year | Men's Winner | Time | Women's Winner | Time |
|---|---|---|---|---|
| 2025 | Garrett Corcoran (USA) | 2:15:48 | Carolina Garcia (USA) | 2:43:23 |
| 2024 | Michael Vernau (USA) | 2:33:07 | Stephanie Finley (USA) | 2:49:35 |
| 2023 | Nicholas Spector (USA) | 2:18:28 | Ann Centner (USA) | 2:43:06 |
| 2022 | Mason Frank (USA) | 2:17:55 | Ann Centner (USA) | 2:38:29 |
| 2020 | Ryan Smith (USA) | 2:27:47 | Anne Theisen (USA) | 2:52:58 |
| 2019 | Sam Long (USA) | 2:32:32 | Liza Reichert (USA) | 2:44:05 |
| 2018 | Andrew Bauer (USA) | 2:24:04 | Casey Crosson (USA) | 2:50:49 |
| 2017 | Benjamin Heck (USA) | 2:29:11 | Erica Weitz (USA) | 2:48:47 |

== See also ==
- List of marathon races in North America
- Darryl Beardall
