= Petaluma Spartan Marathon =

1935 marathon in California

The Petaluma Spartan Marathon was an American marathon race, the first continuously held west of the Mississippi. Local Healdsburg runner, Leland "Clipper" Smith won the race five times including the inaugural 1935 race. The race was held for 25 years under the auspices of the Petaluma Spartans athletic club, being replaced in 1959 by shorter distance races and the modern Clo Cow Half Marathon. The race was the Pacific Coast Amateur Athletic Union tryouts for the USA Olympic marathon squad.

The Petaluma Marathon resumed in 1968 to continue to develop talent for the American Long Distance Olympic Running Team. The 26.2 mile race was held for five consecutive years.
