= Mary Etta Boitano =

American road runner

Mary Etta Boitano (born March 4, 1963) is a former child road running star who achieved some spectacular results in the 1970s, chasing world age group marathon records in the late 1960s and early 1970s with her brother, Mike. Together, the two tallied well over seven world age group records.

== Biography ==
Mary Etta, a contemporary of Mary Decker from the San Francisco Bay Area, is the youngest child from the running Boitano family. Her father, John, and mother, Mary Lucille, were also running road races. John was instrumental in starting the Dolphin South End Runners with Walt Stack as well as the Pamakids with Grant Newland in San Francisco. The Pamakids name standing for Pa, Ma Kids, which evolved from so many people seeing the family running around Lake Merced. Some of those people became recruits to the Running boom of the 1970's, running races that included the family.

Mary Etta earned an appearance in the Sports Illustrated Faces in the Crowd as the first female finisher in the 6.8 mile Dipsea Race at the age of 5. Five years later she became the first female to win the race overall, at the age of 10, beating her brother Mike who had won the previous two years. (Dipsea participants' times are adjusted with an age and gender-based handicapping system.) It is still the fastest time run by a woman. She also received the Sports Illustrated Award of Merit recognition in October 1970.

At the age of 5 she started running marathons, running 3:46:21 at the West Valley Marathon as an 8 year old, which set a world age record. Her 3:57:42 at the 1970 Petaluma Marathon at age 7 years 284 days makes her the youngest human being, boys or girls, to run the marathon under 4 hours. Her 4:27:32 on the same course a year earlier was believed at the time to be the youngest anyone had completed a marathon. It remains the youngest anyone has completed a marathon under 5 hours or 6 hours as well as the youngest for a girl. She won the Avenue of the Giants Marathon at the age of 10. Still at the age of 10, she ran a 3:01.15 marathon which ranked her #13 in the world and 4th in the nation for the year 1974 ahead of Kathrine Switzer and Gabriela Andersen-Schiess who were decades her senior. Such was the Marathon world record progression for women at that time, had she run that time only three years earlier, it would have been the world record. From ages 6 to 13 she logged in well over 40 marathons with the 3:01:15 being her personal best.

She was on the cover of Runners World April 1974.

At the age of 11 she began a string of three straight victories in the famous Bay to Breakers race. She is the youngest winner in the history of the race. She also set the fastest women's finishing time at 43:22 for the 7.86 mile course, a record which stood for 5 years. She went on to win the Women's Division again in 1975 and 1976. In 1983, the course was shortened to an official 12K (7.46 miles). She later ran cross country and track for San Francisco State University and graduated with a bachelor's degree in nursing.

Hal Higdon wrote a "Where are they now" article for Runners World in 2002, locating Mary Etta, now married and working as a computer technician in Sonoma, California where she continues to run for fun. She is inspiring her young children to run.

"Running provided me with opportunities I never would have had otherwise. My advice to other parents: Support your children. If they want to run, let them. The health benefits are overwhelming. My parents are now in their 80s, still walking and running. They introduced me to the sport, and I love them for that."

As Mary Blanchard, she is an assistant track coach at Justin-Siena High School in Napa, California.
