= Devil Mountain Run, 5K, 10K =

Running event in Danville, California

The Devil Mountain Run is a 5000 metre and 10,000 metre (5K and 10K) foot-race held annually in Danville, California since 1978.

== History ==
The Devil Mountain Run was begun as a fundraiser for the Rowan Branch of Children's Hospital Oakland by local volunteers Nancy Lewis and Jacquie Graham, with the first race held as a 10K on Sunday May 21, 1978. All of the following races were held on the first Sunday in May. The initial race drew 2,000 participants and, at its peak, the Devil Mountain Run had over 10,000 runners.

The original course (1978 to 1999) began and ended at the Town and Country Shopping Center after the competitors had run through Danville neighbourhoods. Beginning in 2000, the start of the race was moved to what was then the Andronico's grocery store on Railroad Avenue, with the 10K course modified so that it no longer spent as much time in the neighbourhoods. The first half of the 10K was mostly on San Ramon Valley Boulevard and the last half was on the Iron Horse Trail, a popular biking and jogging trail. Over the 30-plus years of the race, over $2 million was raised for Children's Hospital Oakland.

The race survived near-cancellation at least three times - twice in the 1990s and then also in 2006. The final Children's Hospital Oakland sponsored race was held on May 1, 2011, as the hospital elected to focus their fundraising efforts elsewhere in future. Forward Motion Sports sponsored a free 5K/10K for 2012 and was one of the sponsors for the relaunched 2013 Devil Mountain Run 5K/10K race held on May 5, 2013.

Between 2013 and 2021 Chris McCrary, a resident of Danville and a multi-sport athlete, took the reins of the event, raising funds towards Discovery Counselling Center in San Ramon. New races were created, such as the Buddi Love Mile ( for runners with furry friends) and the Mile Of Truth (to see who could run the fastest mile). Between 2022 and 2023, Darryll Whaley, a resident of Walnut Creek and owner of Team Blue Sky Events, partnered with Chris to enlarge the event in the post-pandemic era. In 2023 the Mile Of Truth became a Grand Prix Championship event, hosting runners from around the state. In 2024, the event was taken over by TBSE Inc., and on May 19, 2024, the Mile Of Truth became a US Masters 1 Mile Championship for Masters runners from all over the United States.

The event continues to raise money for Discovery Counselling Center located in San Ramon, and races now include a 5K/10K, Mile Of Truth, Kids Fun Run, and Buddi Love Mile.
