= The Tahoe Trifecta =

Set of half marathons

The Tahoe Trifecta is a set of three half marathons in three days. It consists of the Emerald Bay Half Marathon, Tahoe Nevada Half Marathon, and the Lake Tahoe Half Marathon.

There's also the Tahoe Triple which is the same races, but the marathon versions instead of the half marathons.

The Tahoe Nevada Marathon and Half Marathon is downhill race that begins at the Spooner Summit Snow Play area and goes to Incline Village. The Emerald Bay Half Marathon is an all downhill race from Emerald Bay to Lakeside Beach. Participants receive medals for each one of the races.

As many athletes bring families with them for the long weekend, family friendly events are held like the free Pumpkin Run.

Travel journalist Anna A. suggest runners planning on doing the races train for specifically for the fact that the races take place in high altitude. The Reno Gazette says the race is popular because endurance athletes are looking for further ways to push themselves.

In 2025, the Tahoe Trifecta takes place on October 17–19.
