= Derrick Smith (soccer) =

United States Virgin Islands soccer player (born 1991)

Personal information
- Date of birth: September 26, 1991 (age 35)
- Place of birth: Media, Pennsylvania, United States
- Height: 1.88 m (6 ft 2 in)
- Position: Defender

Team information
- Current team: Pittsburgh Panthers

College career
Years	Team	Apps	(Gls)
2011–2013	Pittsburgh Panthers		

International career^{‡}
2011–	United States Virgin Islands	12	(0)
- ‡ National team caps and goals as of 20 February 2019

Derrick Smith (born September 26, 1991) is a United States Virgin Islands international soccer player who plays college soccer for the Pittsburgh Panthers, as a defender.

== Career ==
Smith played college soccer for the Pittsburgh Panthers from 2011 to 2013.

He made his international debut for United States Virgin Islands in 2011, and has appeared in FIFA World Cup qualifying matches.
