= Dipsea Race =

Trail running event in California, United States

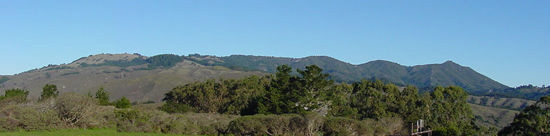
- Mill Valley → Muir Woods → Stinson Beach
- Date: Second Sunday in June
- Location: Marin County, California, US
- Event type: trail
- Distance: 7.5 mi (12 km)
- Established: November 19, 1905
- Course records: Time: Ron Elijah, 44:49, 1974; Consistency: Jack Kirk, 1930–2002; Wins: Sal Vasquez, 7; Streak: Sal Vasquez, 1982–1985
- Website: http://www.dipsea.org/

The Dipsea Race is a trail running event in California, United States. It is the oldest cross-country trail running event and one of the oldest foot races of any kind in the United States. The race is 7.5 miles (12 km) long, with approximately 2,200 feet (671 m) of elevation gain. The race starts in Mill Valley and finishes at Stinson Beach, in Marin County. The Dipsea Race has been held annually almost every year since November 19, 1905 and, since 1983, has been held on the second Sunday in June. The Dipsea celebrated its 115th running on Sunday, June 14, 2026.

== History ==
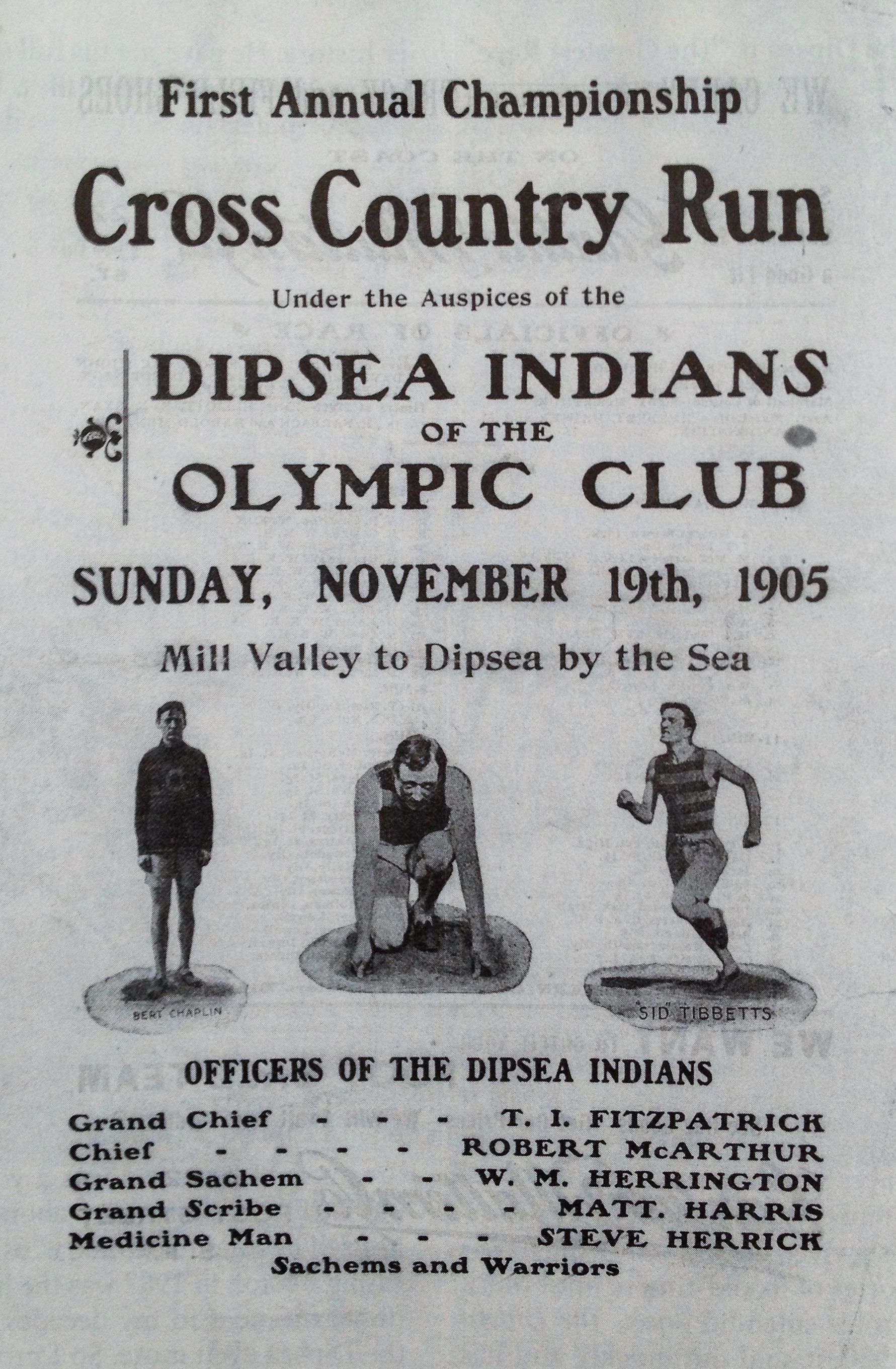
Dipsea Race, 1905 Program Cover

In 1904, the Dipsea Inn opened on a sandspit north of Willow Camp (later Stinson Beach), built in anticipation of tourists arriving on proposed rail extensions. After opening, it was visited by a group of Olympic Club members, including Charles Boas and Alfons Coney, who had a cabin near Muir Woods. Someone proposed racing from Mill Valley to the Inn. Coney and Boas took up the challenge, setting off on a day in 1904, with bets placed by Club members (Fastest from the train depot at Lyton Square in Mill Valley, to the newly opened Dipsea Inn). Boas won.

On November 19, 1905, the first Dipsea Race was held by members of the San Francisco Olympic Club. It took place on a 7.4-mile course, with 110 runners racing from the Mill Valley train depot to the then-new Dipsea Inn in the Bolinas Lagoon between Stinson Beach and Bolinas.

Since then, it has taken place almost annually, only being cancelled a few times in its history: 1932-1933 due to the race not being able to earn enough funds to be financially viable due to the Great Depression, 1942-1945 due to World War II, and 2020 due to the COVID-19 pandemic. In 1977, the race was almost cancelled as the previous year saw an overwhelming number of participants due to the running boom of the 1970s and the local government was worried about overcrowding and also did not want to close down nearby streets. The Marin County Board of Supervisors voted 3–2 to cancel the race until changes could be made. The race ended up being delayed and held in October instead. A "Women’s Dipsea Hike" (called a "hike" to avoid an AAU ban on women's long-distance races.) took place 1918–1922. In 1907, the final run on the sand was eliminated. In 1983, the race date was changed to the second Sunday in June.

The course of the trail was listed on the National Register of Historic Places in 2010, as Dipsea Trail.

Due to the COVID-19 pandemic, the Race committee announced that the 2020 Dipsea Race would be cancelled for the first time since 1945. The committee later announced that the 110th race would be postponed from June to November 2021.

== Course ==
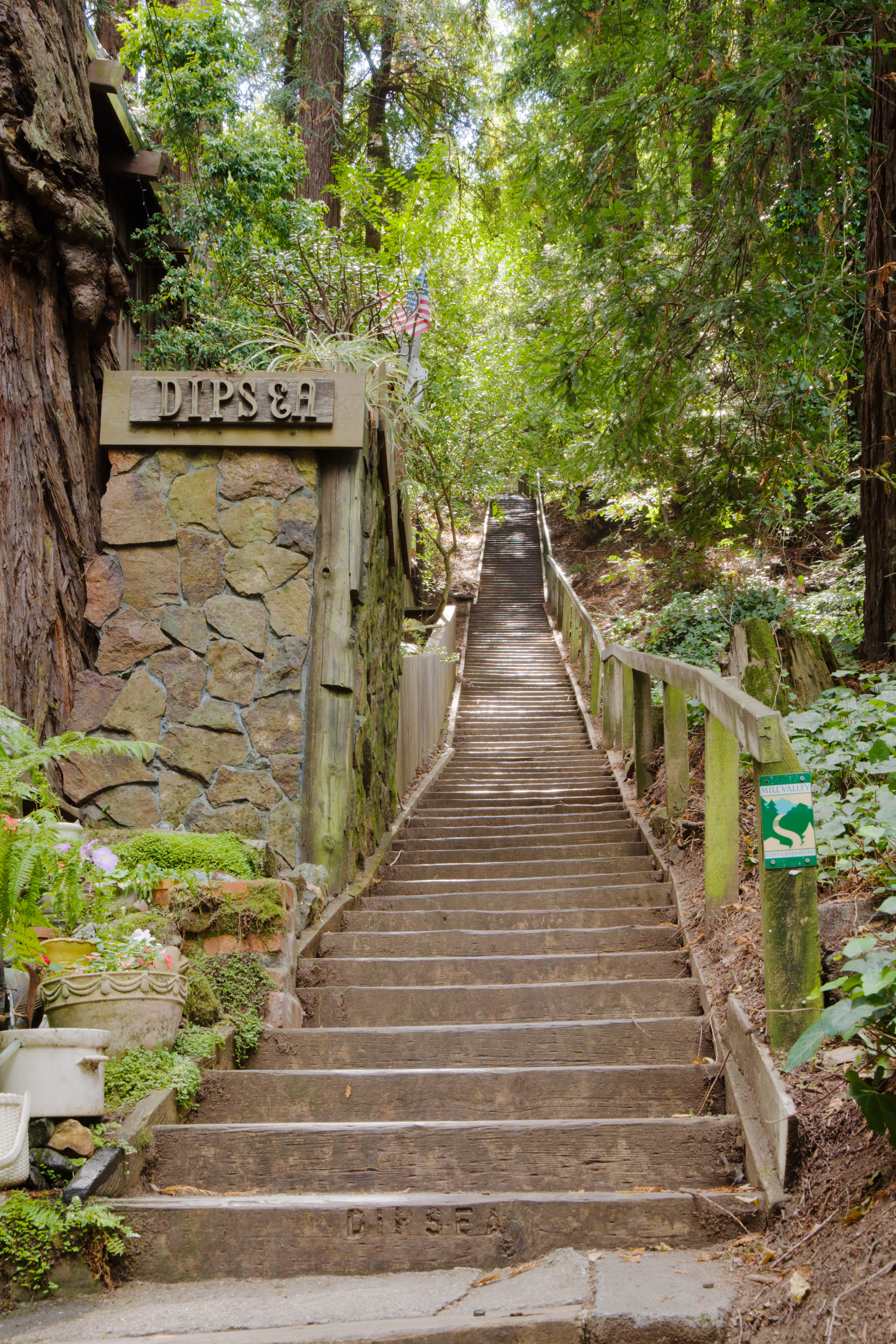
The Dipsea Trail stairs

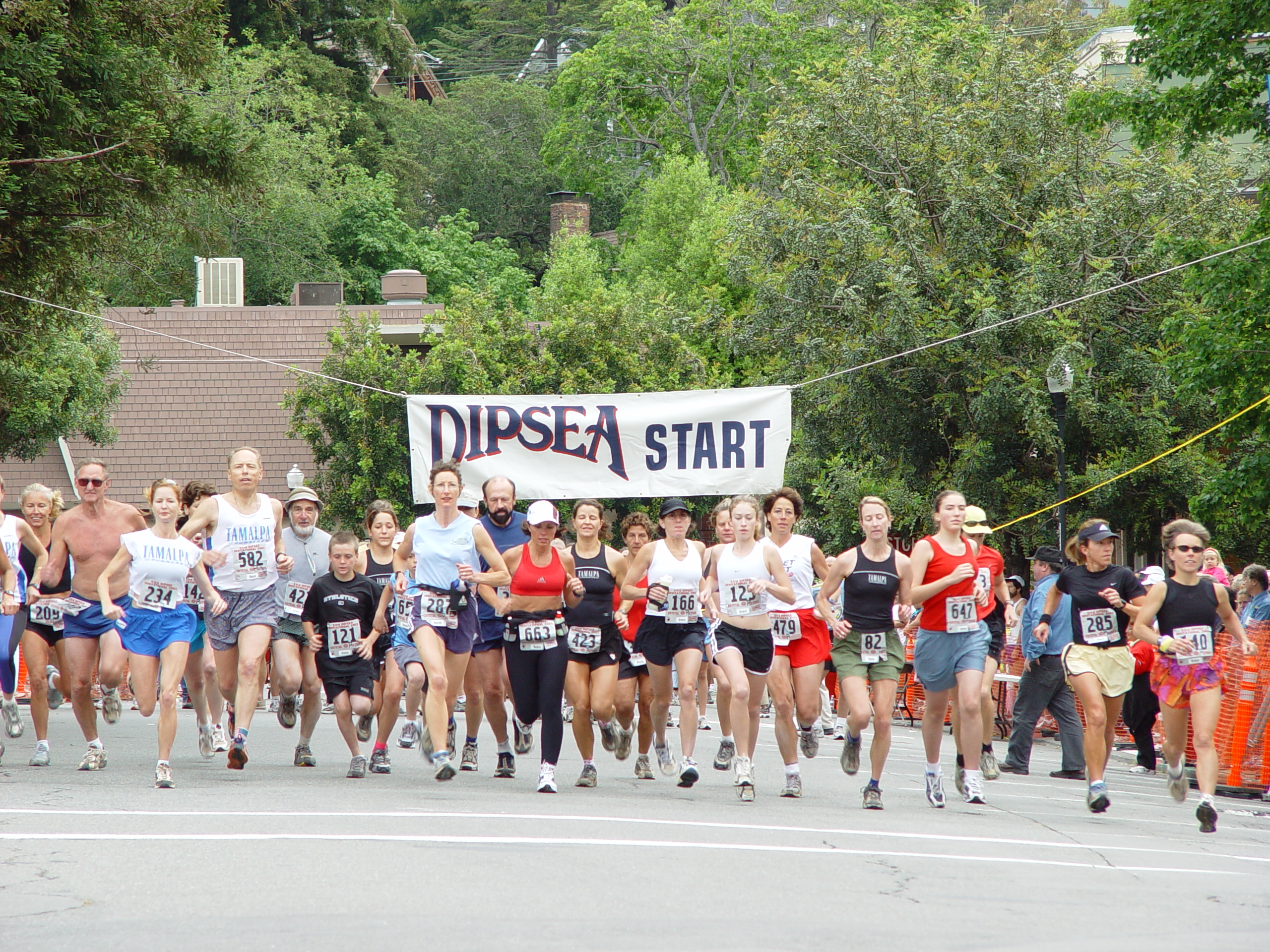
One group leaving the starting line in the 2003 Dipsea Race.

The Dipsea is well known for its scenic course and challenging trails. The race starts on Throckmorton Avenue in Mill Valley, near Miller Avenue, in front of the old train depot (now a bookstore). After traversing a few blocks in Mill Valley's downtown, runners climb 688 stairs (now 700 stairs, after the renovation of the middle section in Nov 2017) leading up the side of Mount Tamalpais, and then pass through Muir Woods National Monument, Mount Tamalpais State Park, and the Golden Gate National Recreation Area. The Dipsea Trail is the most direct route connecting the town of Mill Valley, located near the northwestern shores of Richardson Bay, with the village of Stinson Beach, situated along the Pacific coast. Stinson Beach is a popular tourist destination, located about a 30-minute drive north of San Francisco on Highway 1, via the Golden Gate Bridge. The ascent over the southern shoulder of Mount Tam reaches its apex around the top of Cardiac Hill, about 4.5 miles into the race.

Among the challenges facing participants are the Dipsea Trail's uneven footing, single-track footpaths, and almost invariably steep terrain, featuring about 2,200-foot (671 m) elevation gain and loss over the course. The uniqueness of the Dipsea Race course owes largely to the opportunity for competitors to choose from any of several alternate routes on diverging and converging trails, adding a competitive premium for strategy, experience, and familiarity with the course.

=== Course mileage ===
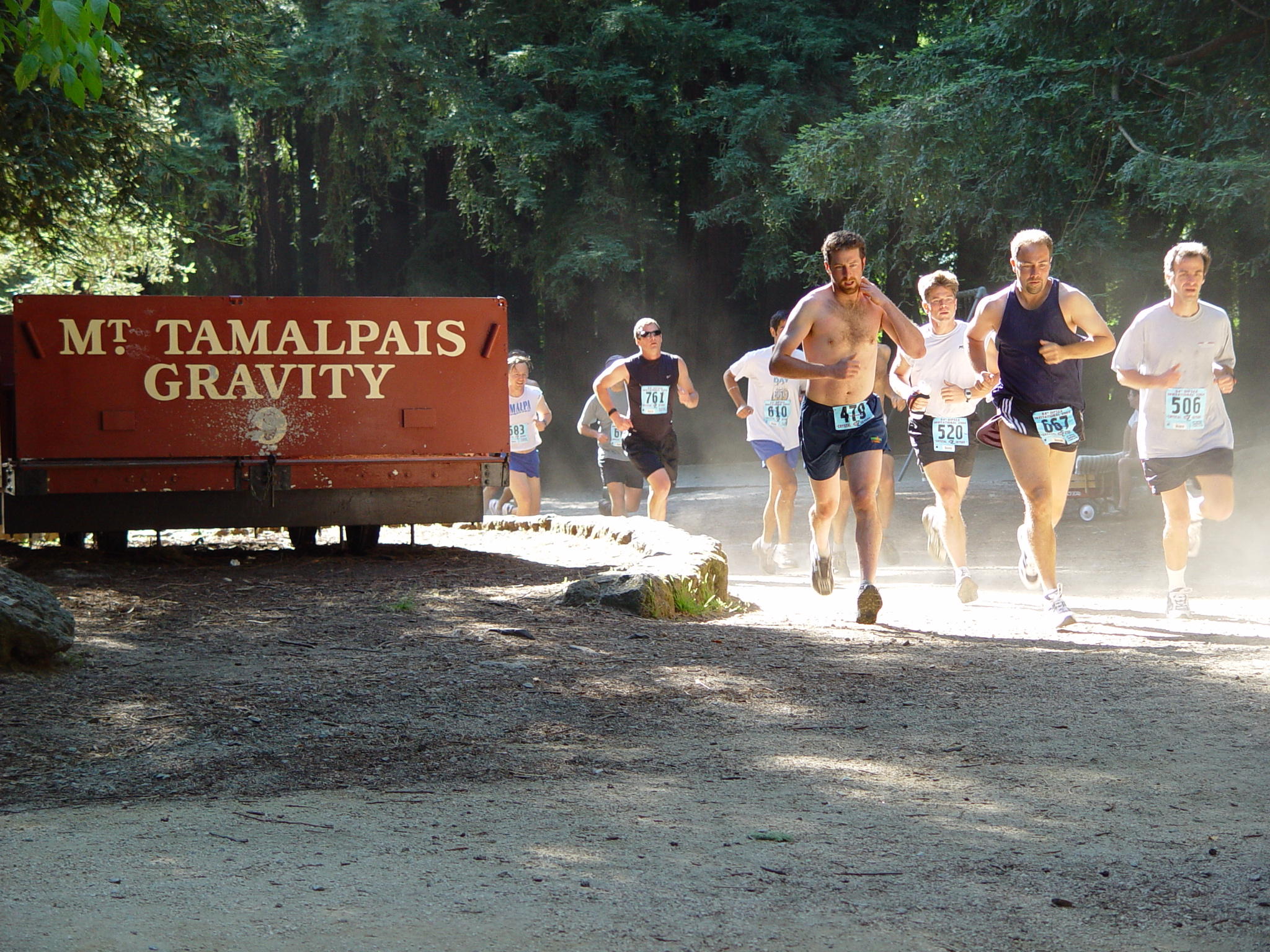
Runners pass a Gravity Car in Old Mill Park during the 2004 race.

Location	Segment distance	Distance total
Old Mill Park	0.2	0.2
Bay View Drive @ Panoramic Highway	0.9	1.1
Muir Woods Parking Lot	1.0	2.1
Cardiac Hill	2.3	4.4
Bridge at Steep Ravine	1.6	6
Stinson Beach	1.5	7.5

== Race details and champions ==
The Dipsea's handicapping system often produces younger or older winners, which adds to the unusual intrigue and suspense created by the race's permissible shortcuts, like 'Suicide' and 'The Swoop'. Most participants, with the exception of 'scratch' runners, are given a head start based on their age and gender. The oldest and youngest runners are given up to a 25-minute advantage over the fastest competitors, making it possible for virtually any age group to produce a race winner; previous winners include children as young as 8, and men and women as old as 72.

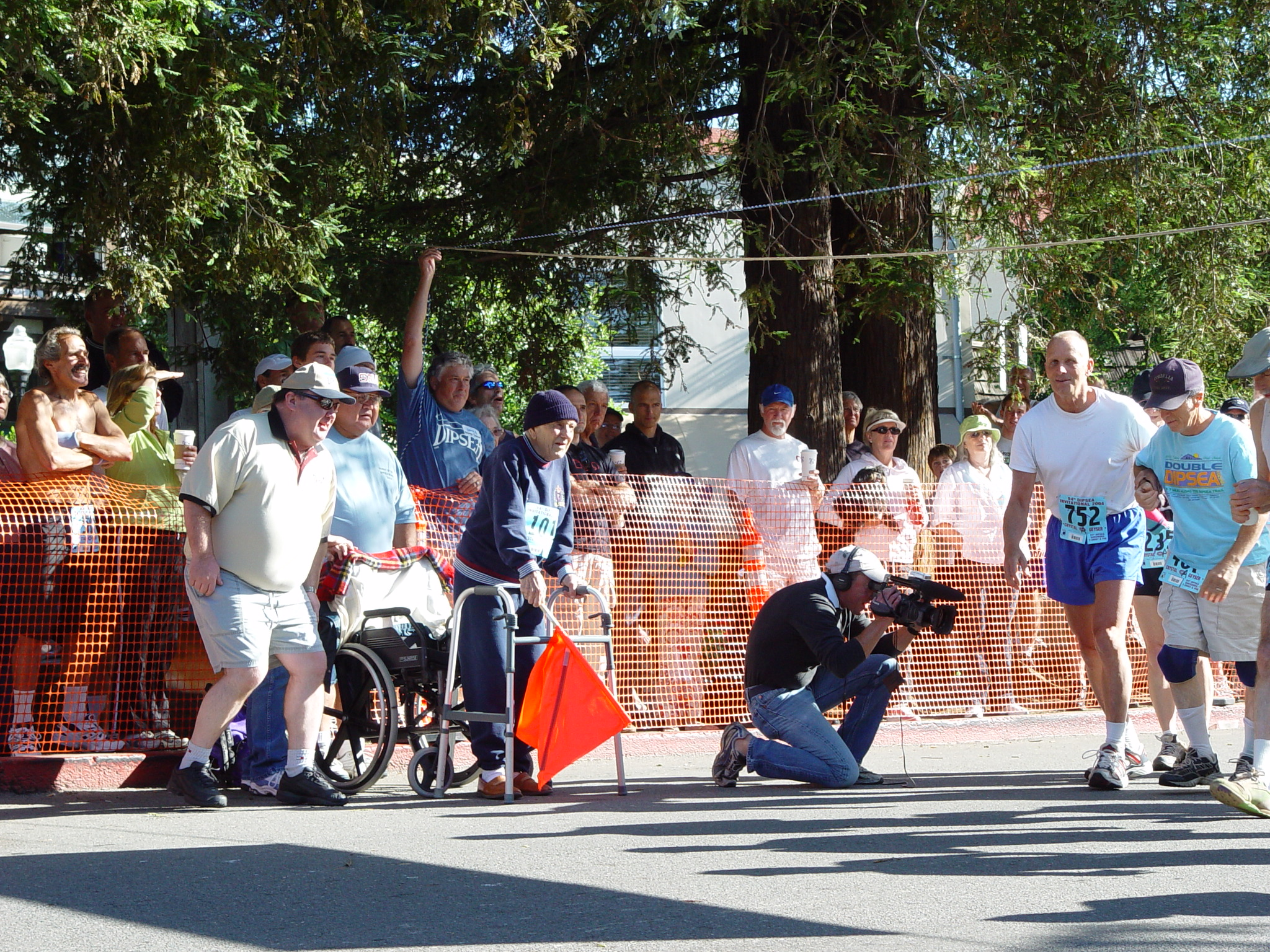
Jack Kirk, who ran in 67 consecutive races from 1930–2002, started the 2004 race.

Because of the nature of the course, the field of competitors is limited to 1,500. It is a popular race, and thousands of people apply for entry every year. This makes it difficult for people, particularly those who have never run it before, to get accepted into the race.

Previous champions include Chris Lundy (2026, 2024, 2018, 2017), Audrey MacLean (2025), Paddy O'Leary (2023), Eddie Owens (2022), Mark Tatum (2021), Brian Pilcher (2019, 2016, 2015, 2009), Diana Fitzpatrick (2013, 2014), Hans Schmid (2012), Jamie Rivers (2007, 2011), Reilly Johnson (age 8, 2010), Roy Rivers (2008), Melody-Anne Schultz (1999, 2003, 2006) Russ Kiernan (1998, 2002, 2005), Shirley Matson (2004, 2001, 2000, 1993) and Sal Vasquez (1982–1985, 1990, 1994, 1997).

Jack Kirk, known as the 'Dipsea Demon', holds the record of most consecutive competitions in the Dipsea, having finished 67 consecutive Dipseas from 1930 until 2002. (There was no official Dipsea Race in 1932 or 1933, due to economic reasons, nor in 1942–1945 due to World War II.) Kirk finished his last complete race in 2002. He started but did not finish in 2003, but did reach the highest elevation, at the top of "Cardiac Hill," at the age of 96. He is the oldest person to have competed in the race. Kirk died on January 29, 2007, at age 100. Kirk's story was documented in the 2004 film "The Dipsea Demon".

== Other races on the Dipsea Trail ==
Two other races use the same course route: the Double Dipsea, held in late June, and the Quad Dipsea, an ultramarathon, which takes place in late November. Despite the use of the Dipsea name, these two races are not officially affiliated with the Dipsea Race.

=== Double Dipsea ===
The Double Dipsea is a 13.7-mile (22 km) run usually held on the Saturday thirteen days after the Dipsea. Initially organized by the Dolphin South End Running Club, San Francisco icon Walt Stack put together the first Double Dipsea race in 1970. As of 2013, the Double Dipsea race is organized by Brazen Racing.

=== Quad Dipsea ===
The Quad Dipsea is a 28.4-mile (45.7 km) trail ultra, held annually in November on the Saturday following Thanksgiving. The Quad starts and finishes in Mill Valley, following the Dipsea Trail westward to Stinson Beach, out-and-back twice over the same course as the Dipsea Race and the Double Dipsea. The race has 9,276 feet (2,827 m) of both climb and descent. First held in 1983 with only 8 runners, the race is now limited to about 250 runners.

== In popular culture ==
The 1986 movie On the Edge, without using the name "Dipsea", revolves around a race that is unmistakably the Dipsea Race. It stars Bruce Dern as a runner obsessed with the race.

It is often described as the race where you are "either the hunter or the hunted" where mental toughness is required to overcome not only the 700 steps, the drop into Muir Woods, the Suicide shortcut, and Dynamite and Cardiac hills, but also the handicapped times.

== See also ==
- Mary Etta Boitano
- Darryl Beardall
- List of annual foot races in California
