= Carl Gilbert (footballer) =

English footballer

Personal information
- Full name: Carl Graham Gilbert
- Date of birth: 20 March 1948 (age 78)
- Place of birth: Folkestone, England
- Position: Forward

Senior career*
Years	Team	Apps	(Gls)
1965–1969	Gillingham	30	(11)
1969–1971	Bristol Rovers	44	(15)
1971–1974	Rotherham United	94	(37)
Total		168	(63)
- * Club domestic league appearances and goals

Carl Graham Gilbert (born 20 March 1948) was an English footballer who played as a forward.

Born in Folkestone, Gilbert played professionally for Gillingham, Bristol Rovers and Rotherham United between 1965 and 1974, making a total of 168 Football League appearances.
