= Derek Smith (footballer, born 1946) =

English footballer

Personal information
- Date of birth: 5 July 1946 (age 80)
- Place of birth: Liverpool, England
- Position: Centre back

Senior career*
Years	Team	Apps	(Gls)
1965–1967	Everton	4	(0)
1967–1970	Tranmere Rovers	82	(21)
Total		86	(21)
- * Club domestic league appearances and goals

Derek Smith is a footballer who played as a centre back in the Football League for Everton and both centre back and forward for Tranmere Rovers. Later moved to Sydney Australia to play with South Sydney Croatia
