= George Jones (footballer, born 1945) =

English footballer

Personal information
- Full name: George Alexander Jones
- Date of birth: 21 April 1945 (age 81)
- Place of birth: Radcliffe, England
- Position: Forward

Senior career*
Years	Team	Apps	(Gls)
1961–1964	Bury	63	(14)
1964–1966	Blackburn Rovers	39	(14)
1966–1973	Bury	256	(100)
1973–1975	Oldham Athletic	71	(19)
1975–1976	Halifax Town	19	(4)
1976–1978	Southport	55	(11)
	Lancaster City	?	(?)
	Radcliffe Borough	?	(?)
Total		503	(162)
- * Club domestic league appearances and goals

George Alexander Jones (born 21 April 1945 in Radcliffe, Lancashire, England), is an English footballer who played as a forward in the Football League.
