= Jim Beardall =

English footballer (1946–2014)

Personal information
- Full name: James Thomas Beardall
- Date of birth: 18 October 1946
- Place of birth: Heywood, Greater Manchester, England
- Date of death: 13 February 2014 (aged 67)
- Place of death: Bury, Greater Manchester, England
- Position: Forward

Youth career
- Whitefield

Senior career*
Years	Team	Apps	(Gls)
1962–1963	Bury		
- Prestwich United
1964–1967	Bury		
1967–1969	Blackburn Rovers	6	(1)
1969–1970	Oldham Athletic	22	(10)
1970–1973	Great Harwood		
1973	Radcliffe		
1973–1976	Great Harwood		
- * Club domestic league appearances and goals

James Thomas Beardall (18 October 1946 – 13 February 2014) was an English footballer who played as a forward.

== Club career ==
Born in Heywood, Greater Manchester, Beardall started his career with boyhood club Bury as an amateur, rejecting a trial at Manchester United in favour of the club he supported.

He continued as an amateur before playing for Blackburn Rovers and Oldham Athletic as a professional.

== Personal life ==
Beardall died in 2014, after suffering with dementia.
