= List of largest running events =

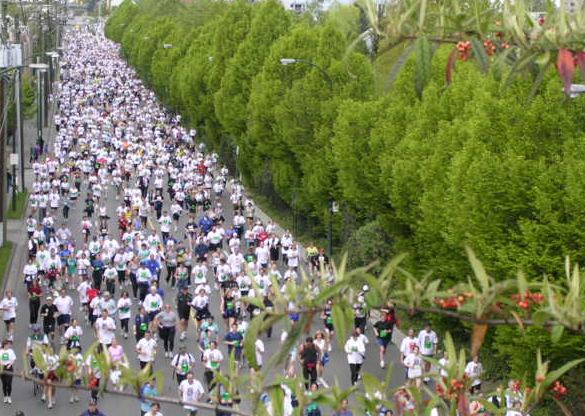
The Vancouver Sun Run is Canada's largest running event.

This list of the largest running events in the world is based on the number of participants. If available, the number of "registered" participants or finishers may be specified. Not all participants will actually complete a race. Running USA's Road Running Information Center estimates that, on average, 80%-85% of registrants will complete a race. If a yearly event has consistently high participation, the year in which that event had the largest number of participants has been listed.

With 110,000 participants, the Bay to Breakers race held on May 18, 1986, in San Francisco, California was recognized by the Guinness Book of World Records as the world's largest footrace. On October 10, 2010, 116,086 out of 160,000 registered runners in Manila were reported to have finished a run entitled "10.10.10 A Run for the Pasig River". An official for the ABS-CBN Foundation said that documentation of the event was being forwarded to Guinness World Records. The Guinness World Records certified Run for the Pasig River as having the most participants in a racing event on December 26, 2010.

On 6 August 2023, Kalaignar Centenary Marathon which was held at Chennai, India is officially recognized and approved by Guinness World Records having 65,762 people taking part and considered as the Largest Running Race Series held in the world.

Since 2014 the Wings for Life World Run is the largest run, though not confirmed by Guinness World Records.

parkrun, a series of weekly 5 km events held on Saturday mornings in 22 countries around the world, has for some time been the largest running event in the world. On a regular Saturday, around 300,000 people take part across nearly 2000 events. The highest ever attendance was on 11 January 2020 where 369,213 people took part across the 1635 events taking place that day.

== Largest running events ==
Position	Race name	Location	Country	Date	Distances	Participation (Note: bold indicates number of race registrants; not-bold indicates number of race finishers)	Notes
1	parkrun	Global	Global	11 Jan 2020	5 km	369,213	
2	Wings for Life World Run	Global	Global	4 May 2024	set own goal	**265,818**	
3	Dubai Run	Dubai	United Arab Emirates	24 November 2023	10 km, 5 km,	**226,000**	
4	Kabaka Birthday Run	Kampala	Uganda	12 April 2026	21 km, 10 km, 5 km	**130,000**	
5	A Run for the Pasig River	Manila	Philippines	10 October 2010	10 km, 5 km, 3 km	**116,086**	
6	Royal Run	Copenhagen/Frederiksberg, Randers, Ringkøbing, Middelfart, Helsingør	Denmark	25 May 2026	10 km, 5 km, 1 mile	**112,450**	
7	Bay to Breakers	San Francisco, California	United States	18 May 1986	12 km	**110,000**	
8	Cursa El Corte Ingles	Barcelona	Spain	5 June 1994	11 km	**109,457**	
9	Broloppet/Broløbet	Malmö / Copenhagen	Sweden / Denmark	12 June 2000	Half-Marathon	**92,266**, 79,837	
10	City2Surf	Sydney	Australia	9 August 2020	14 km	**86,696**, 68,930	
11	Dam tot Damloop	Amsterdam	Netherlands	20 September 2009	10 miles, 4 miles and kids runs	**74,020**	
12	Kalaignar Memorial International Marathon	Chennai	India	6 August 2023	Marathon, half-marathon, 10 km, 5 km	**73,206**	
13	Hong Kong Marathon	Hong Kong	Hong Kong	15 January 2015	Marathon, half-marathon, 10 km, 10 km wheelchair race, 3 km wheelchair race	**73,070**	
14	Round the Bays	Auckland	New Zealand	10 March 2013	8.4 km	**70,000**	
15	JPMorgan Corporate Challenge	Frankfurt	Germany	7 June 2018	5.6 km	**64,377**	
16	Lilac Bloomsday Run	Spokane, Washington	United States	5 May 1996	12 km	**61,298**	
17	United We Run	Beirut	Lebanon	10 April 2005	5 km,	**60,000**	
18	Vancouver Sun Run	Vancouver, British Columbia	Canada	15 April 2012	10 km	**89,000**, 44,167	
19	Holmenkollstafetten	Oslo	Norway	4 May 2024	18,8 km	**72,000**	
20	Göteborgsvarvet	Gothenburg	Sweden	21 May 2011	Half-Marathon	**59,417**	
21	Peachtree Road Race	Atlanta, Georgia	United States	4 July 2008	10 km	**58,000**, 54,954	
22	Course de l'Escalade	Geneva	Switzerland	7-8 December 2024	20.5 km, 7.3 km, 4.8 km, 9 km walk and kids runs	**57,183**	
23	London Marathon	London, England	United Kingdom	27 April 2025	Marathon	**56,640**	
24	Panipat Pinkathon	Panipat, Haryana	India	8 March 2019	21 km, 10 km, 5 km or 3 km run/walk	**55,498**	
25	Great North Run	Newcastle, England	United Kingdom	26 September 2004/ 19 September 2010	Half-Marathon	**54,500**	
26	Bolder Boulder	Boulder, Colorado	United States	26 May 2008	10 km	**54,040**	
27	New York City Marathon	New York City	United States	4 November 2018	Marathon	**53,121**, 52,812	
28	City to Surf	Perth	Australia	25 August 2013	Marathon, Half-Marathon, 12 km, 4 km and Regional Series (Karratha, Geraldton, Albany and Busselton)	**50,756**	
29	Carrera Día Olímpico 5k Olympic Day Run 5K	Medellín	Colombia	23 June 2013	5 km	**50,000**	
30	Paris Marathon	Paris	France	14 April 2019	Marathon	**49,155**	
31	Grete Waitz-løpet	Oslo	Norway	4 May 1996	5 km	**48,461**	
31	Ottawa Race Weekend	Ottawa, Ontario	Canada	23/24 May 2014	Marathon, 1/2 Marathon, 10K, 5K, 2K, Kids Run	**47,387**	
32	Bogotá Half Marathon	Bogotá, Cundinamarca	Colombia	1 August 2010	Half-Marathon, 10 km	**44,186**	(Note: Participants include 14,291 in the half marathon and 29,895 in the 10 km.)
33	Lidingöloppet	Lidingö, Stockholm	Sweden	24 September 2011	Cross country, 30 km	**43,230**	
34	Monument Avenue 10K	Richmond, Virginia	United States	2 April 2011	10 km	**43,214**	
35	Vienna City Marathon	Vienna	Austria	12 April 2015	Marathon	**42,657**	
36	SberPrime Kazan Marathon	Kazan, Tatarstan	Russia	2/3 May 2026	3 km, 10 km, 21.1 km, 42.2 km	**42,503**, 35,687	
37	San Silvestre Vallecana	Madrid	Spain	31 December 2018	10 km	**42,500**	
38	BUPA Great Manchester Run	Manchester, England	United Kingdom	18 May 2014	10 km	**41,300**	
39	Women's Mini Marathon (10k)	Dublin	Ireland	2 June 2014	10 km	**41,006**	
40	Mumbai Marathon	Mumbai, Maharashtra	India	20 January 2013	Marathon, Half-Marathon, Dream Run(6 km), Senior Citizens Race (4.3 km), Champions with Disability category (2.4 km)	**40,000**	
41	Deejay Ten	Milan	Italy	14 October 2018	10 km, 5 km	**40,000**	
42	Jerusalem Marathon	Jerusalem	Israel	15 March 2019	Marathon	**40,000**	
43	Broad Street Run	Philadelphia, Pennsylvania	United States	5 May 2013	10 miles	**38,144**	
44	Chicago Marathon	Chicago, Illinois	United States	7 October 2012	Marathon	**37,455**	
45	Boston Marathon	Boston, Massachusetts	United States	15 April 1996	Marathon	**35,868**	
46	Berlin Marathon	Berlin	Germany	16 September 2018	Marathon	**44,000**	
47	Baloise Antwerp 10 miles	Antwerp	Belgium	23 April 2023	10 miles	**37,500**	
48	20 km of Brussels	Brussels	Belgium	28 May 2023	20 km	**36,692**	
49	Sydney Running Festival	Sydney	Australia	18 September 2011	Marathon, Half-Marathon, 10 km, 3.5 km	**35,033**	
50	OneAmerica 500 Festival Mini-Marathon	Indianapolis, Indiana	United States	4 May 2008	Half-Marathon	**35,000**	
51	Great Ethiopia Run	Addis Ababa	Ethiopia	November 2010	10k	**35,000**	
52	Athens Classic Marathon	Athens, Attica	Greece	9 November 2014	Marathon, 10k, 5k	**35,000**	
53	Bank of America Shamrock Shuffle	Chicago, Illinois	United States	March 25, 2012	8k	**34,369**	
54	Bridge to Brisbane	Brisbane	Australia	11 September 2011	10 km, 5 km	**42,546**, 34,146	
55	HBF Run for a Reason	Perth, Western Australia, Australia	Australia	22 May 2016	4 km, 12 km and 21 km	**33,744**	
56	Cooper River Bridge Run	Charleston, South Carolina	United States	27 March 2010	10 km	**33,000**	
57	Grand Prix von Bern	Bern	Switzerland	10 May 2014	10 miles, 4.7 km, 1.6 km	**32,116**	
58	Run to Feed the Hungry	Sacramento, California	United States	28 November 2024	5 km, 10 km	**31,660**	
59	Philadelphia Marathon	Philadelphia, Pennsylvania	United States	17 November 2013	Marathon, Half-Marathon, 8K	**31,471**	
60	Zevenheuvelenloop	Nijmegen	Netherlands	16 November 2014	15 km, 7 km	**31,307**	
61	Amsterdam Marathon	Amsterdam	Netherlands	19 October 2014	Marathon, Half-Marathon, 8K	**31,197**	
62	Tokyo International Marathon	Tokyo	Japan	28 February 2010	Marathon	**30,170**	
63	Saint Silvester Road Race	São Paulo	Brazil	31 December 2018	15 km	**30,000**	
64	City-Bay	Adelaide	Australia	18 September 2011	12 km, 6 km	**29,715**	
65	JPMorgan Corporate Challenge	Chicago	United States	23 May 2019	5.6 km	**28,418**	
66	Pat's Run	Tempe, Arizona	United States	18 April 2020	4.2 Miles	**28,000**	
67	Honolulu Marathon	Honolulu, Hawaii	United States	8 December 2002	Marathon	**26,382**	
68	CPC Loop Den Haag	The Hague	Netherlands	8 March 2015	Half-Marathon, 10K, 5k	**25,425**	
69	Gold Coast Marathon	Gold Coast	Australia	2 July 2017	Marathon, Half-Marathon, 10k, 5.7k, 4k, 2k	**24,909**	
70	Great South Run	Portsmouth,	United Kingdom	30 October 2011	10 miles	**24,000**	
71	Marine Corps Marathon	Washington, D.C.	United States	28 October 2012	Marathon	**23,519**	
72	La Parisienne	Paris	France	9 September 2012	6.5 km	**23,510**	
73	Rotterdam Marathon	Rotterdam,	Netherlands	12 April 2015	Marathon, 1/4 Marathon	**23,403**	
74	Los Angeles Marathon	Los Angeles, California	United States	8 March 2020	Marathon	**28,300**	
75	Clean Thagadur Marathon-5K	Dharmapuri, Tamilnadu	India	6 January 2019	5K	**21,222**	
76	Seoul International Marathon	Seoul	South Korea	13 March 2005	Marathon	**21,067**	
77	Naha Marathon	Naha	Japan	6 December 2009	Marathon	**20,860**	
78	New York City Half Marathon	New York City, New York	United States	16 March 2014	Half Marathon	**20,828**	
79	Calgary Marathon	Calgary, Alberta	Canada	23/24 May 2026	Marathon, 1/2 Marathon, 10K, 5K, Kids Run	**20,650**	
80	Cardiff Half Marathon	Cardiff, Wales	United Kingdom	6 October 2019	Half Marathon	**20,309**	
81	Bix 7	Davenport, Iowa	United States	21 June 1999	7 miles	**20,117**	
