= Amane Gobena =

Ethiopian long-distance runner (born 1982)

Medal record

Women's athletics

Representing Ethiopia

IAAF World Cross Country Championships
Gold medal – first place	2002 Dublin	Team short race

Amane Gobena Gemeda^{[nb]} (born 11 September 1982) is an Ethiopian long-distance runner who competes primarily in road running events. She has a marathon best of 2:23:50 hours.

She began her international career in cross country running and was part of the Ethiopian team which won the gold medal in the short race at the 2002 IAAF World Cross Country Championships. After modest performances on the track, she found success by switching to road races in 2007.

The 2009 season saw marked improvement as she won the Cooper River Bridge Run and Monument Avenue 10K races. She then went on to take her first marathon win at the Toronto Waterfront Marathon, breaking the course record in only her third outing over the distance. She enjoyed success in East Asia at the start of 2010, winning both the Osaka Ladies Marathon and Seoul International Marathon. Amane also gained her first major wins over other distances that year by taking first place at the Göteborgsvarvet half marathon and winning her first national title in the 10,000 metres.

== Career ==
=== Early career ===
Her first top level performances came in cross country and she finished eighth in the short race at the 2002 IAAF World Cross Country Championships in Dublin, a placing which helped the women's Ethiopian team (including Werknesh Kidane, Abebech Negussie and Genet Gebregiorgis) to the gold medal in the team competition. She competed in track races in Europe in the 2003–2004 season and among her performances was a 5000 metres personal best of 15:19.50, set at the Grand Prix Regione Lombardia in 2004 where she finished fourth. That year she also represented her country at the World Cross Country Championships for a second time, although her eleventh-place finish left her out of the top four Ethiopians who took the team gold.

=== Road running ===
She made her debut in the 10K in 2005 and took second place in a race in Ratingen, finishing behind Teyba Erkesso. She also ran at the Golden Spike Ostrava meeting in June and placed fifth over 5000 m. After taking time out from athletics in 2006, she returned to focus on road races and enjoyed podium finishes in the United States. She was runner-up at the Peachtree 10K and Bolder Boulder races, as well as the Cooper River Bridge Run, where she was beaten by her compatriot Rehima Kedir but set a personal best of 32:12 for the 10K. She also won the six-mile Nacht von Borgholzhausen race in Germany in June that year.

In 2008, she took wins on the global road circuit at the Abu Dhabi 7K and the Wharf to Wharf 6-miler. Other performances included runner-up spots at the Freihofer's Run for Women 5K and Bolder Boulder. She stepped up to the half marathon that year and ran the distance twice in France: she won the Le Lion Half Marathon in Montbéliard (setting a best of 1:12:16) and also won another race in Vemux.

=== Marathon debut ===
Amane made her debut in the marathon in January 2009 at the Houston Marathon and she managed to finish in fifth place. At the Ras Al Khaimah Half Marathon the following month she set a personal best of 1:08:16 to take sixth place in the women's race. Her next outing came at the Los Angeles Marathon in March and she headed to the front of the pack, but was overtaken by Tatyana Petrova in the latter stages of the race. Still, her time of 2:26:53 for second place marked a successful transition to the longer distance. She competed extensively in the United States that summer, starting with wins at the Cooper River Bridge Run and Monument Avenue 10K. A fifth place at the Peachtree Road Race was followed up by a third-place finish at the Boilermaker Road Race. Amane ran her third marathon of the year at the Toronto Waterfront Marathon. She duelled against Mulu Seboka, another Ethiopian runner and the defending champion, in the earlier stages but then pulled away around the 40 km to earn her first win over the distance, breaking the course record with a run of 2:28:30 in the process. She brought a busy year to a close with two runs in September, taking eighth at the Delhi Half Marathon before securing the runner-up position behind Koreni Jelila at the Great Ethiopian Run 10K.

She soon returned to the starting line in 2010 and improved her best mark en route to winning the Osaka Ladies Marathon in January, becoming the first Ethiopian ever to do so in almost thirty years of competition. An appearance at the Zayed International Half Marathon came later in the month, but she was some way off winner Mary Keitany and finished in fifth. She continued her Asian tour at the Seoul International Marathon and took her second victory of the year, outpacing Zhou Chunxiu and setting a career best of 2:24:13 for the distance. Amane won her first national title at the Ethiopian Athletics Championships with a 10,000 metres track win over Genet Getaneh.

She gained her first high-profile win in the half marathon at the Göteborgsvarvet that May. She then returned to the United States for the summer circuit, running at the Freihofer's Run for Women (eighth) and the Bolder Boulder, where she completed an Ethiopian 1–2 behind Mamitu Daska. She was third at the Istanbul Eurasia Marathon as her national rival Ashu Kasim won in a course record time. She won the Xiamen Marathon in January 2011 in her first race of the year. She attempted to defend her title in Seoul, but was unsuccessful as she ended the race in tenth place.

Amane missed 18 months of competition and returned in November 2012 with a runner-up finish at the Istanbul Marathon. The following January she ran a personal best at the 2013 Dubai Marathon, taking third with her run of 2:23:50 hours. She placed seventh at the Paris Marathon and came third at the Bogotá Half Marathon.

She won the 2014 Istanbul Marathon in 2:28:47 in front of her countrywoman Salomie Getnet.

== Major competition record ==
Year	Competition	Venue	Position	Notes
2002	World Cross Country Championships	Dublin, Ireland	8th	Short race
2002	World Cross Country Championships	Dublin, Ireland	1st	Team race
2004	World Cross Country Championships	Brussels, Belgium	11th	Short race

=== Road wins ===
- Nacht von Borgholzhausen: 2006
- Wharf to Wharf: 2007
- Le Lion Half Marathon: 2007
- Cooper River Bridge Run: 2009
- Monument Avenue 10K: 2009
- Toronto Waterfront Marathon: 2009
- Osaka Ladies Marathon: 2010
- Seoul International Marathon: 2010
- Göteborgsvarvet: 2010
- Xiamen International Marathon: 2011
- Istanbul Marathon: 2014, 2015

== Notes ==
- ^{nb} Her name has been transliterated in a number of ways, including Amina Godana, Amane Godana, and Amane Gubena.
- Amane is her given name while Gobena is her patronymic name (see Habesha name).
