= Cross d'Allonnes =

French cross country running competition

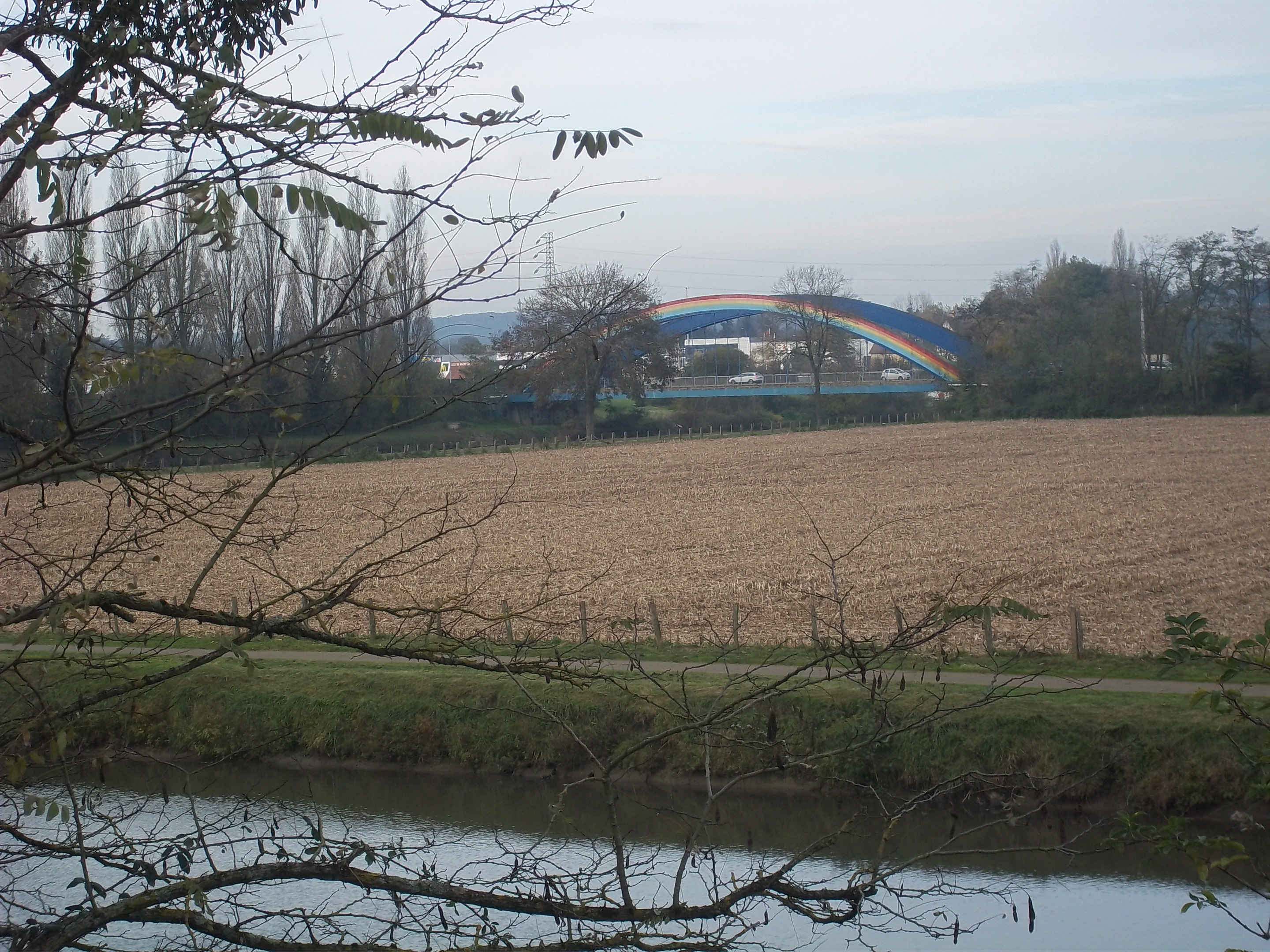
- The north entrance of Allonnes, Sarthe, where the race is held
- Date: November
- Location: Allonnes, Sarthe, France
- Event type: Cross country
- Distance: Varied from 4–10 kilometres (2.5–6.2 mi) as of 2024
- Established: 1965
- Website: Official website

The Cross international Le Maine Libre-Allonnes-Sarthe, also known as Cross d'Allonnes, is an annual professional cross country running competition in Allonnes, Sarthe, Pays de la Loire, France. First held in 1965, it most often takes place in mid- to late-November and is sponsored by French newspaper Le Maine libre. As of 2024 it is a World Athletics Cross Country Tour Gold status meeting, the highest level, joining Festival du Cross as the only such meetings in France.

The distance has varied from 4 kilometres (2.5 mi) to 10 kilometres (6.2 mi) since 2005 as of 2024.

Jimmy Gressier used the 2024 race as a way to make a comeback after injury.

== Professional race winners ==
Ed.	Date	Men's winner	Time (m:s)	Women's winner	Time (m:s)	Ref.
1st	1965	Hirel (FRA)	Unknown	Cisse (FRA)	Unknown	
Not held in 1966
2nd	1967	Michel Géraudie (FRA)	Unknown	Menciere (FRA)	Unknown	
3rd	1968	Jan (FRA)	Unknown	Tondelle (FRA)	Unknown	
4th	1969	Michel Géraudie (FRA)	Unknown	Frenehard (FRA)	Unknown	
5th	1970	Palais (FRA)	Unknown	Riviere (FRA)	Unknown	
6th	1971	Henri Lepape (FRA)	Unknown	Riviere (FRA)	Unknown	
7th	1972	Le Vaillant (FRA)	Unknown	Mignon (FRA)	Unknown	
8th	1973	Rault (FRA)	Unknown	Frenehard (FRA)	Unknown	
9th	1974	Coux (FRA)	Unknown	Nicolas (FRA)	Unknown	
10th	1975	Presland (GBR)	Unknown	Nicolas (FRA)	Unknown	
11th	Jan 1976	Soubitez (FRA)	Unknown	Bazeau (FRA)	Unknown	
12th	Dec 1976	Levisse (FRA)	Unknown	Lucie Drouault (FRA)	Unknown	
13th	1977	Monnerais (FRA)	Unknown	Lucie Drouault (FRA)	Unknown	
14th	1978	Abdenouz (ALG)	Unknown	Lucie Drouault (FRA)	Unknown	
15th	1979	Habchaoui (ALG)	Unknown	Pescheux (FRA)	Unknown	
16th	1980	Dominique Chauvelier (FRA)	Unknown	Hollick (GBR)	Unknown	
17th	1981	Dominique Chauvelier (FRA)	Unknown	Strady (FRA)	Unknown	
18th	1982	Dominique Chauvelier (FRA)	Unknown	Demily (FRA)	Unknown	
19th	1983	Watrice (FRA)	Unknown	Louveau (FRA)	Unknown	
20th	1984	Coux (FRA)	Unknown	Segaert (BEL)	Unknown	
21st	1985	Bereau (FRA)	Unknown	Vauzelle (FRA)	Unknown	
22nd	1986	Bernard (FRA)	Unknown	Bornet (FRA)	Unknown	
23rd	1987	Bereau (FRA)	Unknown	Klotchko (URS)	Unknown	
24th	1988	Dominique Chauvelier (FRA)	Unknown	Cornuault (FRA)	Unknown	
25th	1989	Issangar (MAR)	Unknown	Murcia (FRA)	Unknown	
26th	1990	Issangar (MAR)	Unknown	Lelut-Rebello (FRA)	Unknown	
27th	24 Nov 1991	Vincent Rousseau (BEL)	28:28 (9.4 km)	Natalya Sorokivskaya (KAZ)	13:26 (4 km)	
28th	22 Nov 1992	Vincent Rousseau (BEL)	28:45 (10 km)	Etiemble (FRA)	Unknown	
29th	1993	Regalo (POR)	Unknown	Ana Correira (POR)	Unknown	
30th	Nov 1994	João Junqueira (POR)	Unknown	Solominskaia (RUS)	Unknown	
31st	19 Nov 1995	Didier Sainthorand (FRA)	28:03 (9.38 km)	Taye (ETH)	Unknown	
32nd	24 Nov 1996	Joshua Chelanga (KEN)	27:45 (9.375 km)	Ana Correira (POR)	13:21 (4.025 km)	
33rd	23 Nov 1997	Christopher Ndome (KEN)	Unknown	Marina Bastos (POR)	Unknown	
34th	22 Nov 1998	William Kalya (KEN)	Unknown	Margareta Keszeg (ROM)	Unknown	
35th	21 Nov 1999	Ali Saïdi-Sief (ALG)	27:09 (9.3 km)	Irene Kwambai (KEN)	13:11 (4 km)	
36th	26 Nov 2000	Philemon Kemei (KEN)	Unknown	Elizabeth Chemweno (KEN)	Unknown	
37th	25 Nov 2001	Philemon Kemei (KEN)	Unknown	Yulia Gromova (RUS)	Unknown	
38th	24 Nov 2002	Philemon Kemei (KEN)	Unknown	Ionela Vasile (ROM)	Unknown	
39th	23 Nov 2003	Philemon Kemei (KEN)	Unknown	Meselech Melkamu (ETH)	Unknown	
40th	21 Nov 2004	Tibebu Yenew (ETH)	Unknown	Irene Kwambai (KEN)	Unknown	
41st	20 Nov 2005	Isaiah Kosgei (BRN)	26:50 (9.38 km)	Teresa Wanjiku (KEN)	12:50 (4 km)	
42nd	19 Nov 2006	Peter Muriuki (KEN)	26:55 (9.375 km)	Jéssica Augusto (POR)	12:52 (4 km)	
43rd	18 Nov 2007	Saïd Berioui (MAR)	27:39 (9.4 km)	Samira Mezeghrane (FRA)	16:34 (5 km)	
44th	23 Nov 2008	Jacob Chesire (KEN)	27:51 (9 km)	Marina Ivanova (RUS)	16:15 (5 km)	
45th	22 Nov 2009	Ibrahim Jeilan (ETH)	27:41 (9 km)	Martha Komu (KEN)	16:14 (5 km)	
46th	21 Nov 2010	Nicholas Korir (KEN)	27:24 (9 km)	Purity Rionoripo (KEN)	19:34 (5.5 km)	
47th	20 Nov 2011	Paul Melly (KEN)	26:56 (8.5 km)	Sophie Duarte (FRA)	19:43 (5.5 km)	
48th	18 Nov 2012	Paul Melly (KEN)	27:21 (9.06 km)	Hiwot Ayalew (ETH)	19:44 (6.06 km)	
49th	17 Nov 2013	Yomif Kejelcha (ETH)	26:55 (8.5 km)	Belaynesh Oljira (ETH)	19:21 (5.7 km)	
50th	23 Nov 2014	Yomif Kejelcha (ETH)	27:00 (9 km)	Senbere Teferi (ETH)	17:18 (5 km)	
51st	22 Nov 2015	Aweke Ayalew (BRN)	27:46 (9.39 km)	Dera Dida (ETH)	20:41 (6.4 km)	
52nd	20 Nov 2016	Selemon Barega (ETH)	27:13 (9.39 km)	Beyenu Degefa (ETH)	19:29 (6.05 km)	
53rd	19 Nov 2017	Selemon Barega (ETH)	26:26 (9.39 km)	Hawi Feysa (ETH)	17:24 (5.39 km)	
54th	18 Nov 2018	Josphat Kipchirchir (KEN)	27:00 (9.39 km)	Hawi Feysa (ETH)	17:39 (5.39 km)	
55th	17 Nov 2019	Oscar Chelimo (UGA)	25:32 (9.04 km)	Jakline Cherono (KEN)	19:05 (6.05 km)	
56th	2020	Cancelled due to COVID-19				
57th	21 Nov 2021	Jimmy Gressier (FRA)	26:54 (9 km)	Purity Komen (KEN)	18:22 (5.74 km)	
58th	20 Nov 2022	Melkeneh Azize (ETH)	27:15 (9 km)	Wede Kefale (ETH)	19:18 (5.74 km)	
59th	19 Nov 2023	Samuel Kibet (UGA)	20:40 (6.98 km)	Grace Nawowuna (KEN)	22:55 (6.98 km)	
60th	17 Nov 2024	Jimmy Gressier (FRA)	23:20 (8.42 km)	Grace Nawowuna (KEN)	22:55 (7.61 km)	
61st	23 Nov 2025	Milkesa Fikadu (ETH)	21:13 (6.71 km)	Tirhas Gebrehiwet (ETH)	24:05 (6.71 km)	
