= Sun Run =

Sun Run can refer to:

- Vancouver Sun Run, an annual 10 km run in Vancouver, Canada
- An Explorer Scouts event
- Sun Run (Ararat River tributary), a stream in Patrick County, Virginia

== See also ==
- Sunrun
