= Gobena (surname) =

Gobena is an Ethiopian surname. Notable people with the surname include:

- Abebech Gobena (1935–2021), Ethiopian humanitarian
- Amane Gobena (born 1982), Ethiopian long-distance runner
- Thomas Gobena (born 1971), Ethiopian bassist

== See also ==
- Gobena (disambiguation)
