= Tilahun Regassa =

Ethiopian long-distance runner

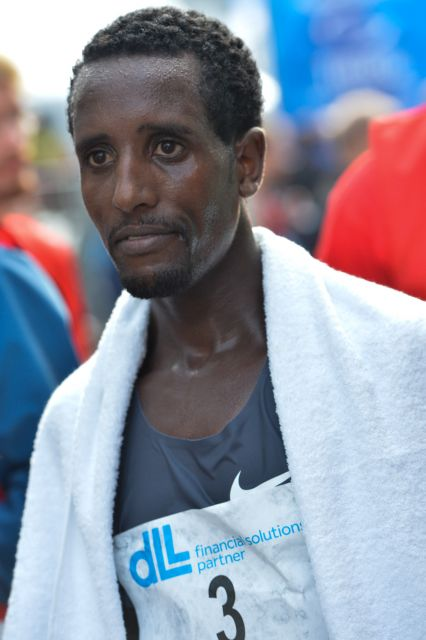
Tilahun Regassa

Tilahun Regassa Dabe (born 18 January 1990) is an Ethiopian long-distance runner who mainly competes in road running competitions. He has a half marathon best of 59:19 minutes and has won the Zayed International Half Marathon and Lille Half Marathon. He made his marathon debut at the 2012 Chicago Marathon and ran the third fastest ever debut of 2:05:27 hours.

He has won a number of major road races in the United States including the Boilermaker Road Race, Bolder Boulder, Crescent City Classic, Monument Avenue 10K, the Cooper River Bridge Run, and the Falmouth Road Race. He represented Ethiopia at the 2009 IAAF World Half Marathon Championships and won the team bronze medal.

== Career ==
Born in the city of Nazret, he endured a difficult childhood. His parent divorced when he was three and he was raised by his father until the age of fifteen, when his father died. Tilahun worked for a stone company and lived on the streets for three years afterwards, relying on food handouts. Tilahun's first road races came as a teenager in Addis Ababa. He ran at the Great Ethiopian Run in 2006 and came fourth with a time of 28:34.77 minutes. He returned a year later but managed only ninth. Having demonstrated promise as a runner, local coaches told Hussein Makke, an elite running manager, of his potential. Makke took him into his stable of runners and Tilahun began training full-time.

Tilahun began competing in Europe for the first time in 2008 and his calibre became obvious. He was runner-up at the 20 kilomètres de Maroilles (timing 59:18 minutes), then ran 5000 metres and 10,000 metres bests of 13:12.40 and 27:32.60 minutes on the track. He showed his aptitude was for longer races, however, as at the Lille Half Marathon he won on his debut over the distance with a time of 59:36 minutes. It was one of the fastest times for a teenage athlete and set a new all-comers record for France. He ran his second half marathon race two months later in Delhi and his time of 1:00:28 was good enough for fourth in the high quality race. He was runner-up to Tadesse Tola at the inaugural Bahir Dar Cross Country in December.

He ran frequently in 2009 and began in the United States. He won the Monument Avenue 10K, Cooper River Bridge Run, and Bolder Boulder races, as well as taking second at the Bay To Breakers. He was dominant at the Falmouth Road Race 7-miler in August, winning in a time of 31:41 minutes. In his first international selection he ran at the 2009 IAAF World Half Marathon Championships: although he was only eleventh overall, he led the Ethiopian men to the bronze medal in the team competition. He returned to the Delhi Half Marathon in November and again took fourth place. He took his first a career victory at the Great Ethiopian Run that month, edging Abera Kuma at the finish.

The first race of 2010 was an impressive one for Tilahun: he ran a new best and course record of 59:19 minutes to win the Zayed International Half Marathon. This brought him US$300,000 in prize money and his manager later reflected that these sudden earnings affected the athlete, saying that ""Tilahun is one of the most talented athletes in the world. Unfortunately, he is a wild man, in every meaning of the word. He is a great guy, a great talent, but he is wild." Heading to the United States he ran under 28 minutes for the 10K at the Cooper River Bridge Run (placing third with 27:52), won the Crescent City Classic, then ran a best of 45:50 minutes for third at the Cherry Blossom Ten Mile Run. He was top three at both the Bay to Breakers and Bolder Boulder, but missed the rest of the season through injury. After a long period out, he returned in good form as a pacemaker at the 2011 Chicago Marathon and reached the 30 km mark in 1:29:25 hours. Towards the end of 2011 he had run of 60:59 minutes in Delhi and ran a 10K best at the São Silvestre De Luanda taking third with 27:50 minutes.

He opened 2012 with a runner-up performance at the Houston Half Marathon, finishing behind Feyisa Lelisa. He set a 10,000 m best of 27:18.90 minutes on the track at the FBK Games and won the Crazy 8's Road Race and Boilermaker Road Race in July. This was the build up for his debut over the marathon distance that October. He entered the 2012 Chicago Marathon and produced a surprise performance on his first attempt, running the third fastest debut ever and taking third place with a time of 2:05:27 hours. His first victory over the distance came soon after, as he won the 2013 Rotterdam Marathon by over a minute in April 2013.

== Personal bests ==
- 5000 metres – 13:12.40 min (2008)
- 10,000 metres – 27:18.90 min (2012)
- 10 kilometres – 27:32+ min (2008)
- 15 kilometres – 42:41 min (2011)
- 20 kilometres – 57:42 min (2011)
- Half marathon – 59:19 min (2010)
- 25 kilometres – 1:14:14 hrs (2011)
- 30 kilometres – 1:29:03 hrs (2012)
- Marathon – 2:05:27 hrs (2012)
