= Amane =

- Gender: Unisex

Origin
- Origin: Japanese
- Meaning: It can have many different meanings depending on the kanji used.
- Region of origin: Japan

Amane is a Japanese given name which can also be used as a surname. It is also an Ethiopian given name.

== Written forms ==
- あまね (in hiragana)
- アマネ (in katakana)

Forms in kanji can include:

- 天音 "heavenly sound"
- 雨音 "The sound of the rain"
- 周 "everywhere"

== People ==
- Nishi Amane (西周, 1829–1897) Japanese philosopher
- Amane Shindō (進藤 あまね; born 2004), Japanese voice actress and singer
- Amane Gubena (born 1986) Ethiopian runner
- Amane Kanata (天音かなた), Japanese virtual YouTuber for Hololive Production
- Amane Okayama (岡山 天音; born 1994), Japanese actor

== Fictional characters ==
With the given name Amane

- Amane Amanohara (周), a character in tricksters
- Amane Fujimiya the main protagonist of light novel anime series The Angel Next Door Spoils Me Rotten
- Amane Bakura (天音), a character in Yu-Gi-Oh!
- Amane Kamori, a character in Her Majesty's Dog
- Amane Kasai, a character in Delicious Party Pretty Cure
- Amane Kaunaq (雨音), a character in Tenchi Muyo! GXP
- Amane Kurihara, a character in Kamen Rider Blade
- Amane Kuzuryu, a character in Shin Megami Tensei: Devil Survivor
- Amane Mochizuki, a character in If My Heart Had Wings
- Amane Nishiki, a character in BlazBlue
- Amane Ōtori (天音), a character in Strawberry Panic!
- Amane Suou, a character in Grisaia no Kajitsu, Grisaia no Meikyuu, Grisaia no Rakuen
- Amane Yugi, a character in the manga and anime "Jibaku Shounen Hanako-kun" or "Toilet-Bound Hanako-kun"
- Amane Kusaba, one of the main characters from the anime Beyblade Burst Gachi. In the English Dub (Beyblade Burst Rise), he is renamed Arman Kusaba.
- Amane Momose (遍), a character in MILGRAM
- Amane (アマネ, Amane) is a female servant of the Zoldyck Family Hunter X Hunter
- Amane Ubuyashiki, a character in Demon Slayer: Kimetsu no Yaiba

With the surname Amane

- Kaoru Amane (雨音), a character in Taiyou no Uta
- Misa Amane (弥), a character in Death Note
- Yuki Amane (阿万音 由季), a character in Steins;Gate
- Suzuha Amane (阿万音 鈴羽), a character in Steins;Gate
- Yūichirō Amane (天音 優一郎), a character in Seraph of the End. His adopted name is Hyakuya (百夜 - meaning "hundred nights"), after the orphanage he grew up in.
- Mochizuki Amane (望月 天音), the oldest student character in If My Heart Had Wings (video game)

== Other uses ==
- Amane, Bhiwandi, a village in India
