= Milkesa Fikadu =

Ethiopian steeplechaser

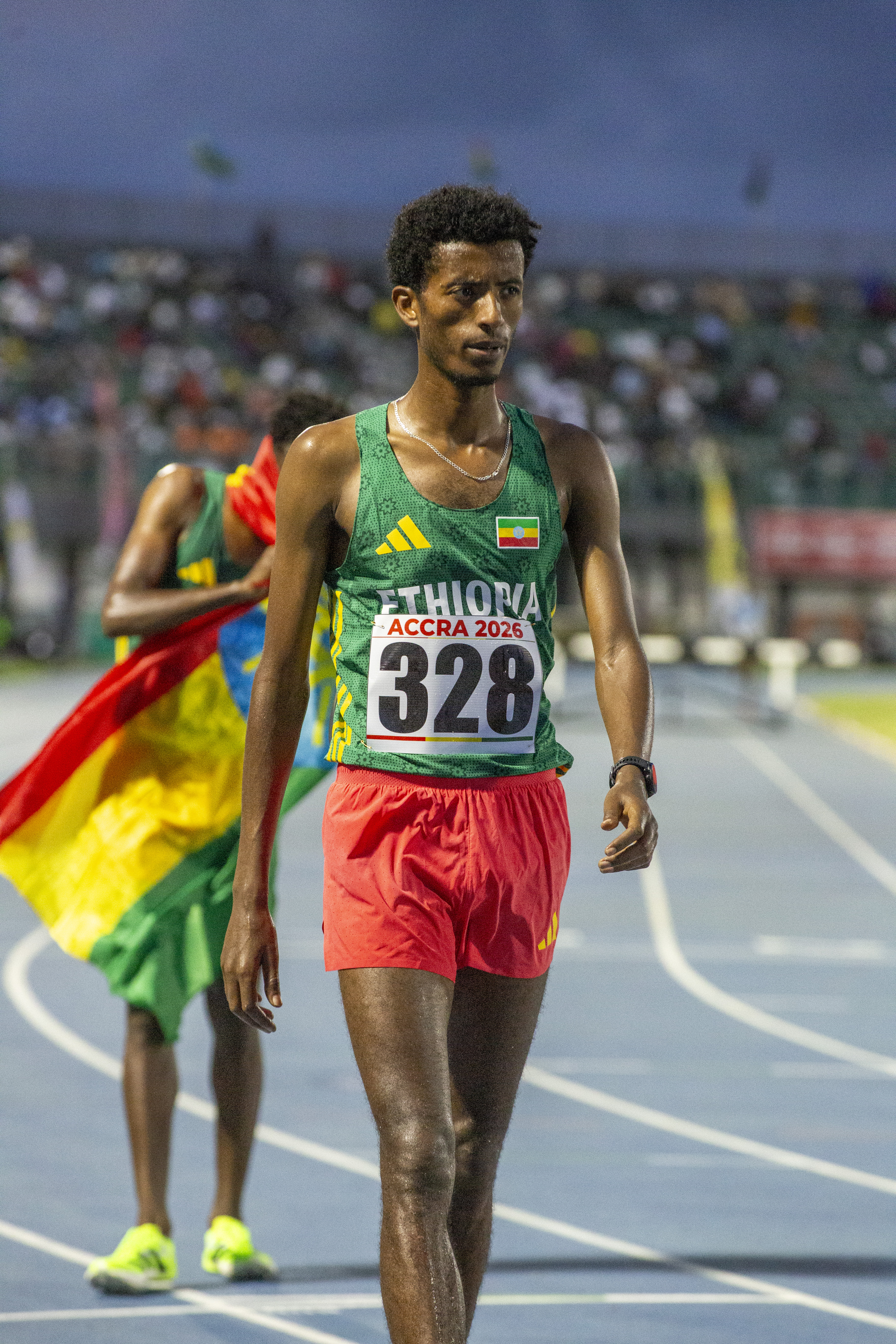

Personal information
- Born: 22 June 2005 (age 21)

Sport
- Sport: Athletics
- Event: Steeplechase

Achievements and titles
- Personal bests: 3000m: 7:42.66 (Lyon, 2024); 3000m s'chase: 8:11.97 (Decines, 2025)
Medal record
Men's athletics
Representing Ethiopia
World Cross Country Championships
Bronze medal – third place	2026 Tallahassee	Mixed relay

Milkesa Fikadu (born 22 June 2005) is an Ethiopian cross country runner and steeplechaser.

== Career ==
Fikadu won at the Meeting Indoor de Lyon over 3000 metres in February 2025, in a time of 7:42.66. He placed fifth overall in the final of the 3000 metres steeplechase at the 2024 African Games in Accra, Ghana. He placed thirteenth in the 3000m steeplechase at the 2024 Meeting de Paris.

Fikadu won the 3000 metres steeplechase at the Meeting National Est Lyonnais in Decines in July 2025, in a personal best time of 8:11.97. won the 2025 Cross d'Allonnes in France, ahead of home athlete Yann Schrub.

Fikadu competed for Ethiopia at the 2026 World Athletics Cross Country Championships in the mixed relay in Tallahassee, Florida, winning the bronze medal, alongside Wegene Adisu, Gela Hambese and Hirut Meshesha.
