= Gobena =

Gobena may refer to:

- Gobena (surname), an Ethiopian surname
- Gobana Dacche (1821–1889), an Ethiopian military commander
- Göbenä (Tatar: Гөбенә), a Russian river in Chuvashia and Tatarstan

== See also ==
- Goeben (disambiguation)
