= Goeben =

Goeben may refer to:

- August Karl von Goeben (1816-1880), Prussian general
- SMS Goeben, a German battlecruiser launched in 1911

== See also ==
- Gobin, a list of people with the surname or given name
- Gobena (disambiguation)
