= Vancouver Sun Run =

Annual 10-kilometre race in Vancouver, British Columbia, Canada

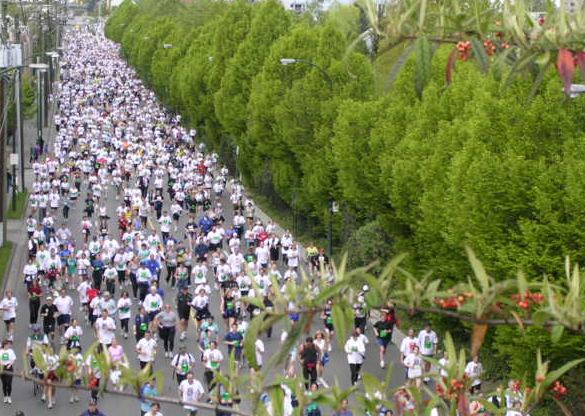
- Date: Third or fourth Sunday in April
- Location: Vancouver, British Columbia, Canada
- Event type: Road
- Distance: 10km
- Primary sponsor: HerbaLand Naturals
- Established: 1985
- Organizer: Run Vancouver Holdings ULC
- Course records: Men: Joseph Kimani (KEN) 27:31; Women: Isabella Ochichi (KEN) 30:58
- Website: Vancouver Sun Run

The Vancouver Sun Run, owned by Run Vancouver Holdings ULC and sponsored by The Vancouver Sun newspaper, is a 10-kilometre road running event held in Vancouver every year on the third (sometimes the fourth) Sunday in April since 1985. It is one of the largest road races in North America.

== Attendance ==
The first Vancouver Sun Run in 1985 started with approximately 3,700 participants, and has grown significantly since:

- With over 39,000 finishers in 2006, it ranked as the 9th largest race in the world and the 3rd largest 10-km race, behind only the Peachtree Road Race in Atlanta and the Bolder Boulder in Boulder.
- The 2006 event took place on April 23 and 50,746 participants registered for the 10-km Sun Run and the 2.5-km "mini Sun Run", which was run by 2,000 people, mostly children and their parents, with some school teams participating as well.
- On April 15, 2007, the Sun Run had a record number of participants, with 54,317 people registered to participate in the 10-km and 2.5-km races, making it the largest road race in Canada, the second largest in North America and the third largest in the World.
- On April 20, 2008, the record was again broken, with 59,179 runners registered for the run making it the largest 10-kilometre race in the world. The temperature was a chilly 3 °C (37.4 °F).
- On April 17, 2011, the record was again broken, with 60,000 runners registered for the run making it the largest 10-kilometre race in the world.
- On April 15, 2012, the cool weather didn't stop 48,904 from taking part.
- Due to the COVID-19 pandemic, the 2020 event was cancelled and the 2021 event operated as a virtual race.

== Race details ==
The primary mandate of the Sun Run is to "promote health, fitness and community spirit and to support amateur athletics". In conjunction with the run a large number of 13-week clinics (including Nordic walking, walking, learn to run and run faster) are conducted at community centres throughout the province. The run is not a charity event; however, the organizers claim over $1.1 million in race proceeds have been donated to charities since 1985. It includes a relatively small number of competitive elite runners, a wheelchair race, and numerous other categories of participants ranging from running enthusiasts to parents walking with their children in strollers. The various categories start the race at different times, with the wheelchair and elite runners first, and slower runners following in numerous waves. For several years, individual runners have had their times recorded by an electronic chip attached to their shoes, which triggers a timer at the starting line and again at the finish.

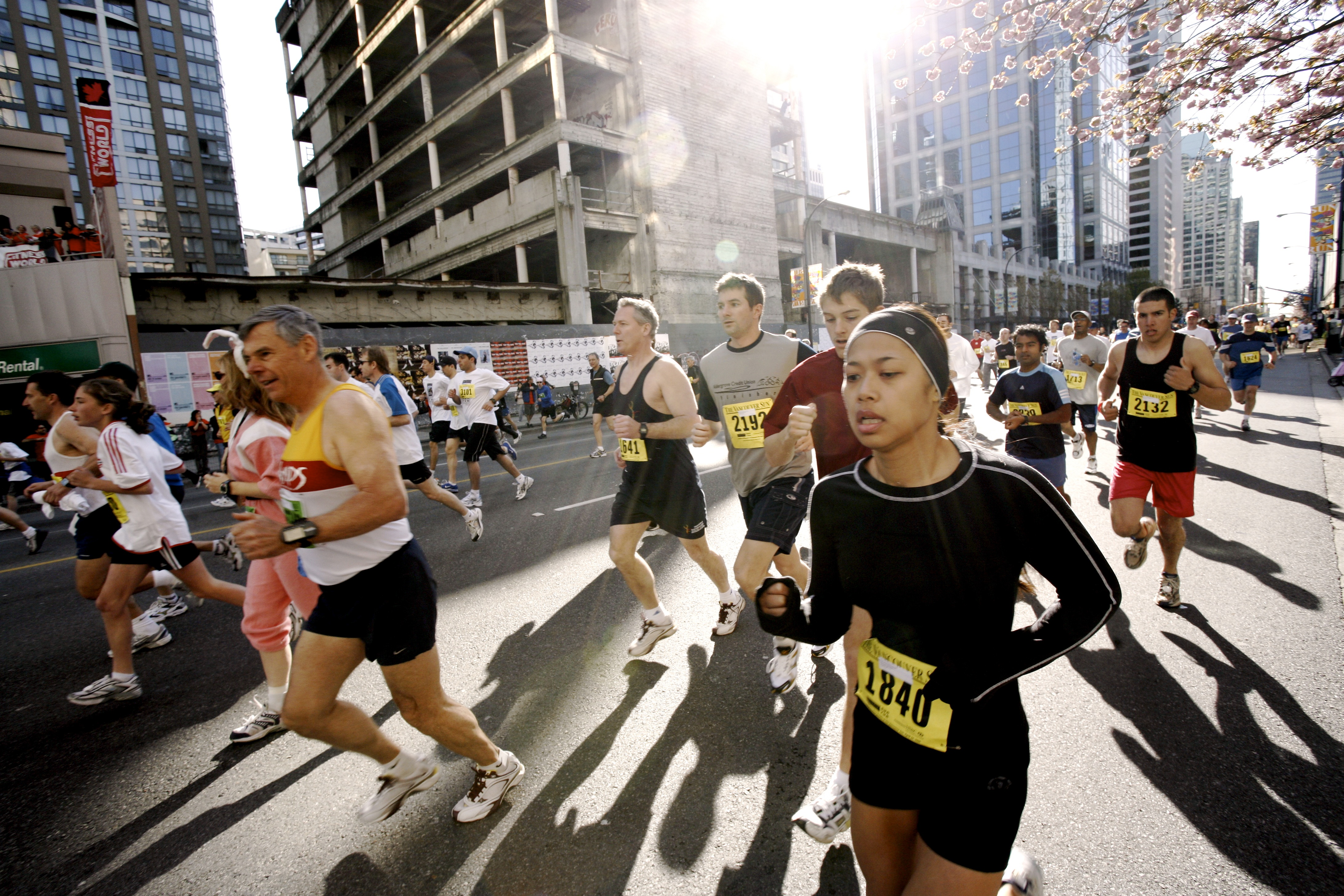
Vancouver Sun Run in 2006

The current route of the race begins on Georgia Street in downtown Vancouver, with the starting line just west of the intersection of Burrard Street, and ends outside BC Place Stadium after guiding runners through the downtown peninsula and parts of the Kitsilano and Fairview neighbourhoods south of False Creek. The run organizing committee hires numerous entertainers to perform along the route and in the stadium at the end of the race, including local humour/cover band The Neurotics, who have played at the starting line every year since 1995.

Hundreds of volunteers also assist with organizing, preparing for, and coordinating the race, including amateur radio operators involved in ARES (Amateur Radio Emergency Service) programs from the Lower Mainland.

In the aftermath of the bombings at the 2013 Boston Marathon, Vancouver Sun Run race organizers have petitioned runners to wear blue and yellow, the official Boston Marathon colours, in solidarity and remembrance of those killed and injured in Boston a week prior.

Race organizers have noted a surge in race registration in the few days after the Boston Marathon explosions as the Sun Run anticipates one of the highest turnouts in its 29-year history.

== Past winners ==
- All information taken from Association of Road Racing Statisticians.

Key = Course record

Year	Male winner	Country	Time (m:s)	Female winner	Country	Time (m:s)
1985	Rob Lonergan	Canada	28:47	Susan Lee	Canada	32:39
1986	Graeme Fell	Canada	29:30	Debbie Scott-Bowker	Canada	33:31
1987	Graeme Fell	Canada	29:11	Lynn Kanuka-Williams	Canada	32:15
1988	Paul Williams	Canada	29:12	Lynn Kanuka-Williams	Canada	33:04
1989	Rex Wilson	New Zealand	28:44	Lynn Kanuka-Williams	Canada	32:19
1990	David Campbell	Canada	28:54	Debbie Scott-Bowker	Canada	33:06
1991	Philip Ellis	Canada	29:03	Patricia Puntous	Canada	33:48
1992	Paul Williams	Canada	29:03	Nancy Tinari	Canada	32:44
1993	Silvio Guerra	Ecuador	28:42	Leah Pells	Canada	32:48
1994	Daniel Komen	Kenya	27:46	Daria Nauer	Switzerland	32:55
1995	Simon Chemoiywo	Kenya	28:27	Olga Appell	United States	32:57
1996	Joseph Kimani	Kenya	27:31	Angela Chalmers	Canada	31:05
1997	Tom Nyariki	Kenya	27:56	Sally Barsosio	Kenya	31:47
1998	Christian Weber	Canada	28:40	Krystina Pieczulis	Poland	32:55
1999	Simon Chemoiywo	Kenya	28:52	Tina Connelly	Canada	32:41
2000	James Koskei	Kenya	27:36	Sally Barsosio	Kenya	32:24
2001	James Koskei	Kenya	28:06	Sally Barsosio	Kenya	33:04
2002	James Koskei	Kenya	27:58	Sara Dillabough	Canada	33:17
2003	Paul Koech	Kenya	28:48	Aster Demissie	Ethiopia	33:20
2004	Thomas Kiplitan	Kenya	28:43	Émilie Mondor	Canada	31:10
2005	Michael Power	Australia	29:26	Nicole Stevenson	Canada	32:30
2006	Gilbert Okari	Kenya	28:27	Isabella Ochichi	Kenya	30:58
2007	Solomon Tsige	Ethiopia	29:22	Teyba Erkesso	Ethiopia	32:05
2008	Festus Langat	Kenya	29:26	Genet Gebregiorgis	Ethiopia	33:35
2009	Willy Kimosop	Kenya	29:04	Abebu Gelan	Ethiopia	34:04
2010	Kip Kangogo	Kenya	29:02	Malindi Elmore	Canada	33:06
2011	Eric Gillis	Canada	29:06	Lucy Njeri	Canada	33:41
2012	Kelly Wiebe	Canada	29:13	Natasha Fraser	Canada	34:12
2013	Paul Kimugul	Kenya	29:04	Natasha Fraser	Canada	32:42
2014	Paul Kimugul	Kenya	28:59	Rachel Cliff	Canada	33:14
2015	Luke Puskedra	United States	28:53	Risper Gesabwa	Kenya	32:28
2016	Eric Gillis	Canada	28:52	Lanni Marchant	Canada	32:15
2017	Joseph Gray	United States	29:38	Karolina Jarzynska-Nadolska	Poland	32:39
2018	Brendan Gregg	United States	29:14	Monicah Wanjuhi	Kenya	32:23
2019	Justin Kent	Canada	29:30	Natash Wodak	Canada	32:38
2020	cancelled due to COVID-19 pandemic					
2021	cancelled due to COVID-19 pandemic					
2022	Lucas Bruchet	Canada	28:29	Leslie Sexton	Canada	32:37
2023	John Gay	Canada	29:40	Leslie Sexton	Canada	32:22
2024	Thomas Fafard	Canada	28:45	Glynis Sim	Canada	32:17
2025	Sam Atkin	United Kingdom	28:09	Glynis Sim	Canada	32:54
2026	Justin Kent	Canada	28:40	Makenna Fitzgerald	Canada	32:24

== Charity ==
Since 1997, one dollar from each Sun Run registration has been contributed to Raise-a-Reader, a national literacy campaign. The campaign went national in 2001, and has since raised over $10 million.

Sun Run proceeds also benefit B.C. amateur athletics through the Achilles International Track And Field Society and The Vancouver Sun Jerome International Track Classic, an annual track and field event that gives local athletes the chance to compete against some of the world's best in their own province.

== Race dates ==
The race is held on the third or fourth Sunday of April each year.

- April 17, 2011 (27th)
- April 15, 2012 (28th)
- April 21, 2013 (29th)
- April 27, 2014 (30th)
- April 19, 2015 (31st)
- April 17, 2016 (32nd)
- April 23, 2017 (33rd)
- April 22, 2018 (34th)
- April 14, 2019 (35th)
- April (cancelled), 2020 (36th)
- April 17, 2021 (37th)
- April 24, 2022 (38th)
- April 16, 2023 (39th)
- April 21, 2024 (40th anniversary)
- April 27, 2025 (41st)
- April 19, 2026 (42nd)
