= Zayed International Half Marathon =

Road running event in Abu Dhabi, United Arab Emirates

- Date: Early January
- Location: Abu Dhabi, United Arab Emirates
- Event type: Road
- Distance: Half marathon
- Established: 2008
- Website: Zayed Half Marathon

The Zayed International Half Marathon is an annual road running competition which takes place in January in Abu Dhabi, United Arab Emirates. The inaugural edition of the half marathon race, named after Zayed bin Sultan Al Nahyan, was held in 2008. The race takes place on an AIMS-certified course, which means performances are eligible for record-breaking purposes.

== History ==
The first edition featured many top international runners as the organisers offered a large amount of prize money, including a first prize of US$300,000 and a total pot of US$2 million. Samuel Wanjiru (the world record holder in the event) won the men's race while Lornah Kiplagat (the two-time World Road Running champion) took the prize for the female competition. The 2009 race was scheduled to take place at the Yas Marina Circuit Formula One course, but this was never finalised and the competition was postponed for that year.

The race had its second edition in 2010 and again attracted many high calibre international athletes. A five kilometre race was also added to the programme and more than 35,000 people took part in the races. However, runners criticised the organisation of the race: some athletes were not informed of changes to the start time, and some roads were not closed to traffic and the public, resulting in runners having to weave their way through cars and school children between the Marina Mall and the Emirates Palace. The top three finishers in the men's half marathon race all recorded sub-one hour times in spite of warm conditions.

Mansour bin Zayed Al Nahyan, the race patron, announced that the competition would change to a full marathon race for the 2011 edition. This will make the race the second marathon event in the UAE, after the Dubai Marathon.

== Past winners ==
Key: Course record

Half marathon
Edition	Year	Men's winner	Time (h:m:s)	Women's winner	Time (h:m:s)
1st	2008	Samuel Wanjiru (KEN)	1:00:33	Lornah Kiplagat (NED)	1:08:52
—	2009	Not held	—	Not held	—
2nd	2010	Tilahun Regassa (ETH)	59:19	Mary Keitany (KEN)	1:07:14
—	2011	Not held	—	Not held	—
—	2012	Not held	—	Not held	—

== See also ==
- Ras Al Khaimah Half Marathon
