= JPMorgan Corporate Challenge =

Annual series of road footraces

The J.P. Morgan Corporate Challenge is an annual series of 3.5-mile (5.63 km) road footraces owned and operated by JPMorgan Chase, with an intended focus on promoting fitness, camaraderie and team work to employees of local businesses and organizations. Teams are organized by company or organization, and the JPMorgan Chase Foundation celebrates the participants by making a donation to local charities.

== History ==
The Corporate Challenge was founded in 1977 by Manufacturers Hanover with a single race in New York City, with 200 runners from 50 companies. It has since grown to include 13 races in seven countries on five continents, with total participation in 2017 of 248,937 entrants from 7,334 companies.

The events are all-inclusive of skill levels and age, with nearly equal numbers of racers, joggers and walkers. Throughout the 2017 Series, participation was approximately 53-percent male, 47-percent female. Seven of the 13 Corporate Challenge races in 2017 achieved a full capacity of entrants and most had a pre- and post-race hospitality component, where companies could gather to celebrate their participation.

The J.P. Morgan Corporate Challenge Series marked its 42nd consecutive year of operation in 2018. Through all 42 years, the Corporate Challenge has been owned and operated by J.P. Morgan and its predecessor firms. Manufacturer Hanover was the title owner of the Corporate Challenge from 1977 to 1991. The event was called the Chemical Bank Corporate Challenge from 1992 to 1995, the Chase Corporate Challenge 1996–2000, the JPMorgan Chase Corporate Challenge 2001–10, and by its current name, the J.P. Morgan Corporate Challenge, since 2011.

The unifying event of the Series is the J.P. Morgan Corporate Challenge Championship, which features the first-place men's, women's and mixed teams from each of the 13 Series cities. The Championship was first held in 1983, and the 34th Championship was conducted on 13 June 2017 in Frankfurt, Germany. Aaron Bienenfeld of Frankfurter Laufshop (Frankfurt) and Trisha Byler of DuPont (Rochester) earned the men's and women's individual titles. Airbnb, Google (San Francisco) and Morgan Stanley (New York) captured the mixed, men's and women's team titles, respectively.

== Results ==
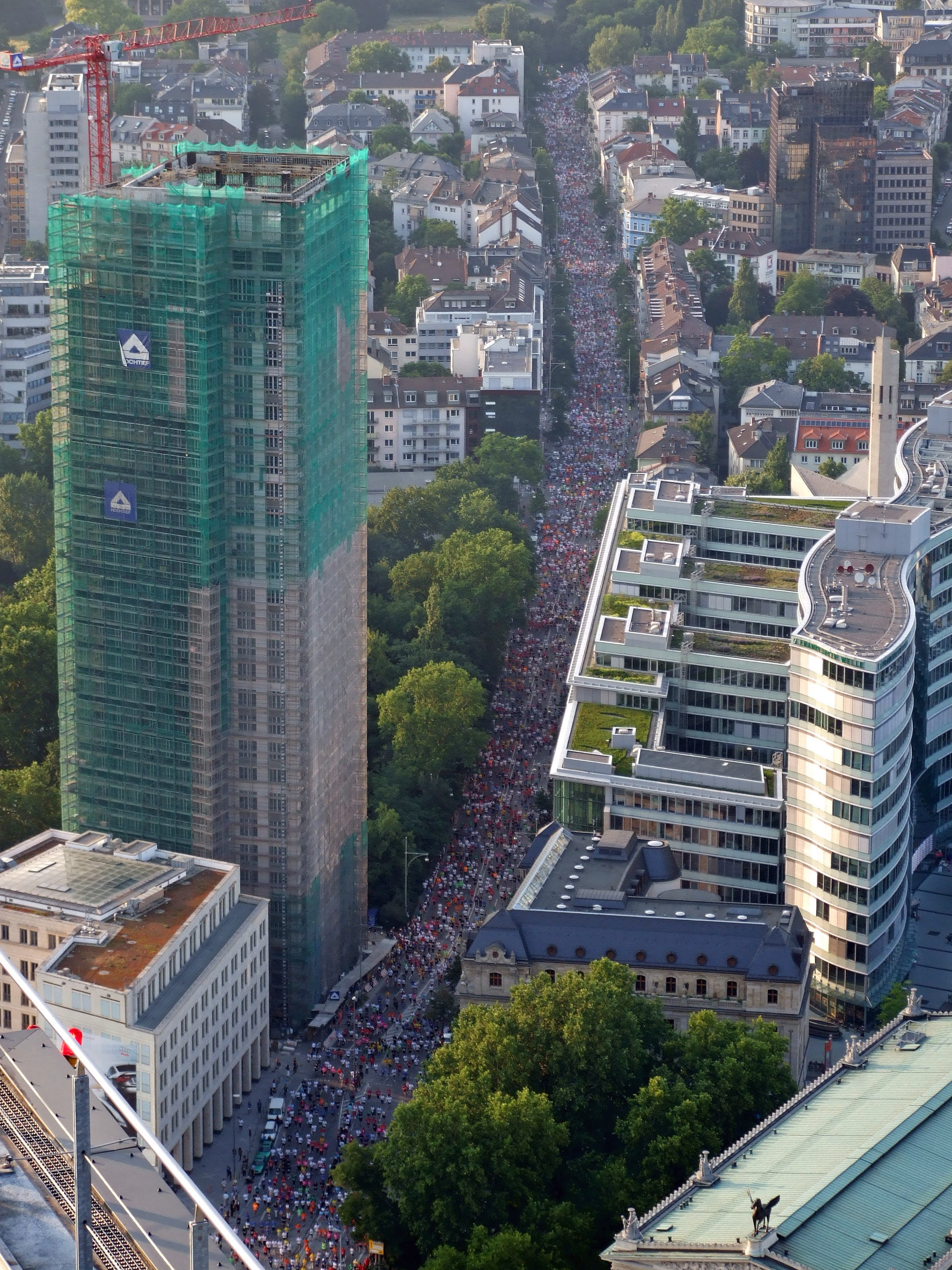
Overhead view from the Frankfurt J.P. Morgan Corporate Challenge

Corporate Challenge participation
City	2017			2016		
City	Date	Runners	Companies	Date	Runners	Companies
Johannesburg, South Africa	30 March	14,006	269	7 April	13,796	237
Singapore	27 April	14,239	318	28 April	14,202	351
Chicago, Illinois	25 May	27,114	617	26 May	27,037	683
Rochester, New York	11 July	7,496	329	24 May	10,236	402
Buffalo, New York	15 June	12,446	358	23 June	12,488	383
Frankfurt, Germany	13 June	63,445	2,419	15 June	68,119	2,633
New York City	31 May	15,000	354	1 June	15,000	350
New York City	1 June	15,000	338	2 June	15,000	357
Syracuse, New York	6 June	8,287	285	7 June	7,862	280
Boston, Massachusetts	8 June	9,006	364	9 June	9,475	324
London, England	5 July	14,898	361	6 July	13,776	372
London, England	20 July	14,346	419	21 July	14,099	357
San Francisco, California	7 September	10,858	354	8 September	10,542	367
Shanghai, China	7 November	5,995	190	20 October	4,900	140
Sydney, Australia	1 November	8,804	391	9 November	8,586	353
