= Monument Avenue 10K =

Road running event in Richmond, Virginia

Ukrop's Monument Avenue 10K
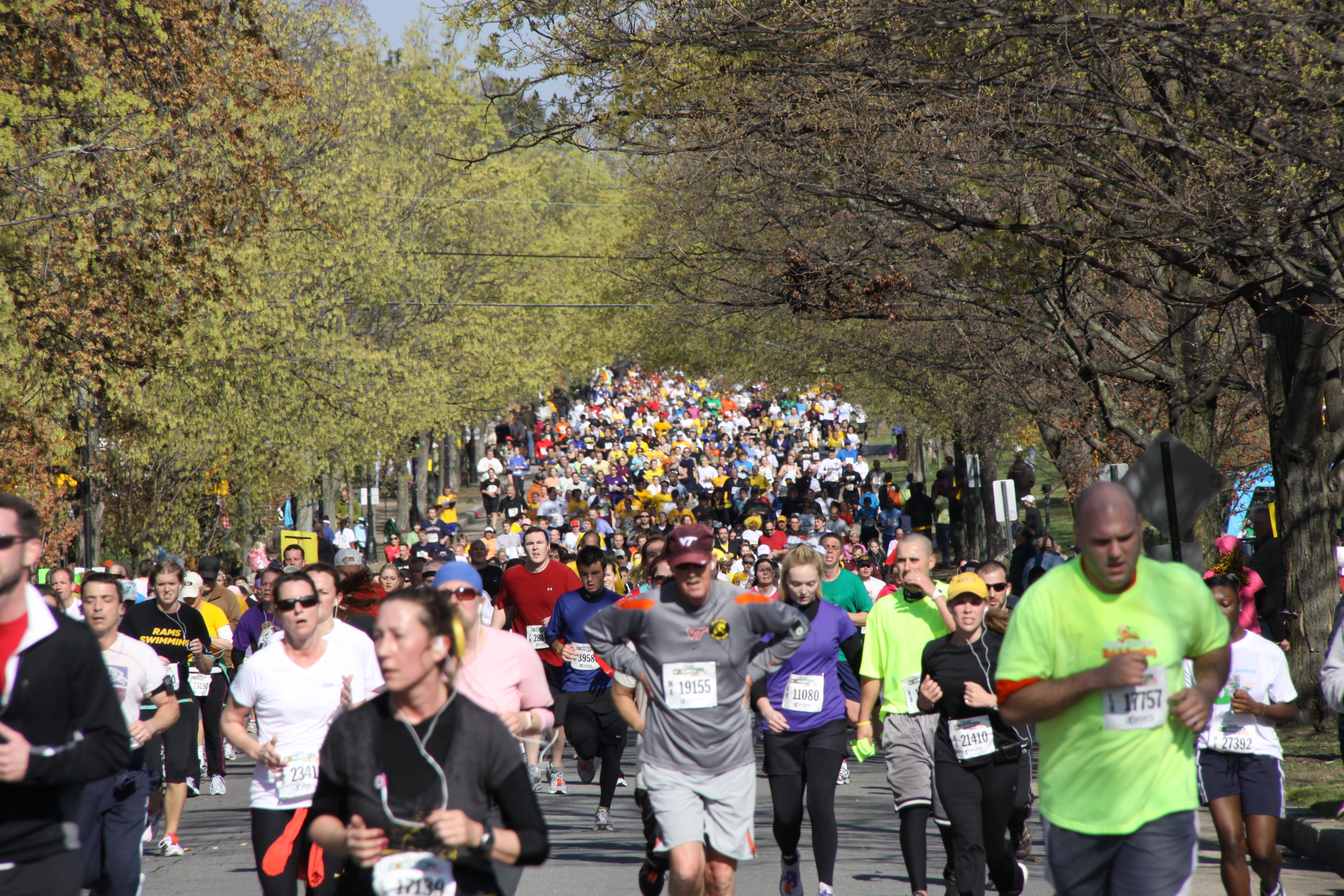
- Location: Richmond, Virginia, US
- Distance: 10 km (6.2 mi)
- Established: March 2000
- Participants: 25,000

The Ukrop's Monument Avenue 10K, also known as the Monument Avenue 10K, is an annual 10-kilometer road running event, sanctioned by USA Track and Field. The race is run on historic Monument Avenue in Richmond, Virginia. Begun in 2000, the race has grown to be the fourth-largest 10k in the country and the 22nd largest race of any distance in the world. It has been named by USA Today as one of the ten great road races in the United States. The event has 30 bands, dozens of spirit groups and many costumed runners.

In 2006, Barbara and Jenna Bush ran the race under aliases. In 2007 the race had over 25,000 registered runners making it the fourth-largest 10k in America.

== Winners and participants ==
= Course record

Year	Men's winner	Time	Women's winner	Time	Participants
2000	Jared Segera (USA)	29:27	Alisa Harvey (USA)	35:25	2,462
2001	Elly Rono (KEN)	29:59	Anna Pichrtová (TCH)	34:57	4,680
2002	Reuben Chesang (KEN)	29:32	Lyubov Denisova (RUS)	33:22	6,531
2003	Gilbert Koech (KEN)	28:34	Edna Kiplagat (KEN)	32:28	9,318
2004	Reuben Chebii (KEN)	28:07	Tatyana Petrova (RUS)	32:46	14,163
2005	Ernest Meli Kimeli (KEN)	28:43	Tatyana Petrova (RUS)	32:46	16,511
2006	Nicodemus Malakwen (KEN)	28:31	Magdalene Makunzi (KEN)	32:33	20,119
2007	Teferi Bacha (ETH)	28:29	Magdalene Makunzi (KEN)	32:24	25,023
2008	Abdi Abdirahman (USA)	28:32	Leah Kiprono (KEN)	34:19	31,158
2009	Tilahun Regassa (ETH)	28:21	Amane Gemeda (ETH)	32:37	32,745
2010	Alene Reta (ETH)	28:26	Megan Wright (CAN)	33:06	37,365
2011	Julius Kogo (KEN)	29:02	Megan Wright (CAN)	33:12	41,314
2012	Mengistu Nebsi (ETH)	28:33	Malika Mejdoub (MAR)	33:07	40,638
2013	Julius Kogo (KEN)	28:18	Ogla Kimaiyo (KEN)	32:25	38,685
2014	Paul Chelimo (KEN)	29:24	Kellyn Johnson (USA)	33:18	36,365
2015	Tyler McCandless	29:38	Kellyn Tyalor	33:21	26,485
2016	Silas Frantz	30:46	Nicol Raynor	34:01	23,165
2017	Ryan Hagen	30:37	Rachel Ward	35:55	21,695
2018	Matthew McDonald	30:10	Bethany Sachtleben	33:37	21,304
2019	Philo Germano	29:34	Bethany Sachtleben	32:39	

== Race promotion and charity ==
Race promotions are officially run by the non-profit group Sports Backers, which promotes an active lifestyle in the area. Sports Backers have programs that support youth running, bike infrastructure and fitness opportunities for the underserved. It is sponsored by Kroger.

The Massey Cancer Center in Richmond, Virginia is one of the charitable partners of the 10K. The Massey Fundraising Challenge supports the world-class cancer research being done there. The other charity is the Sports Backers' Kids Run RVA program to provide support for youth running throughout the Richmond area. More than 12,000 kids are part of the program annually and a particular emphasis is placed on providing opportunities for underserved youth to participate.
