= Cooper River Bridge Run =

Road running event in South Carolina, US

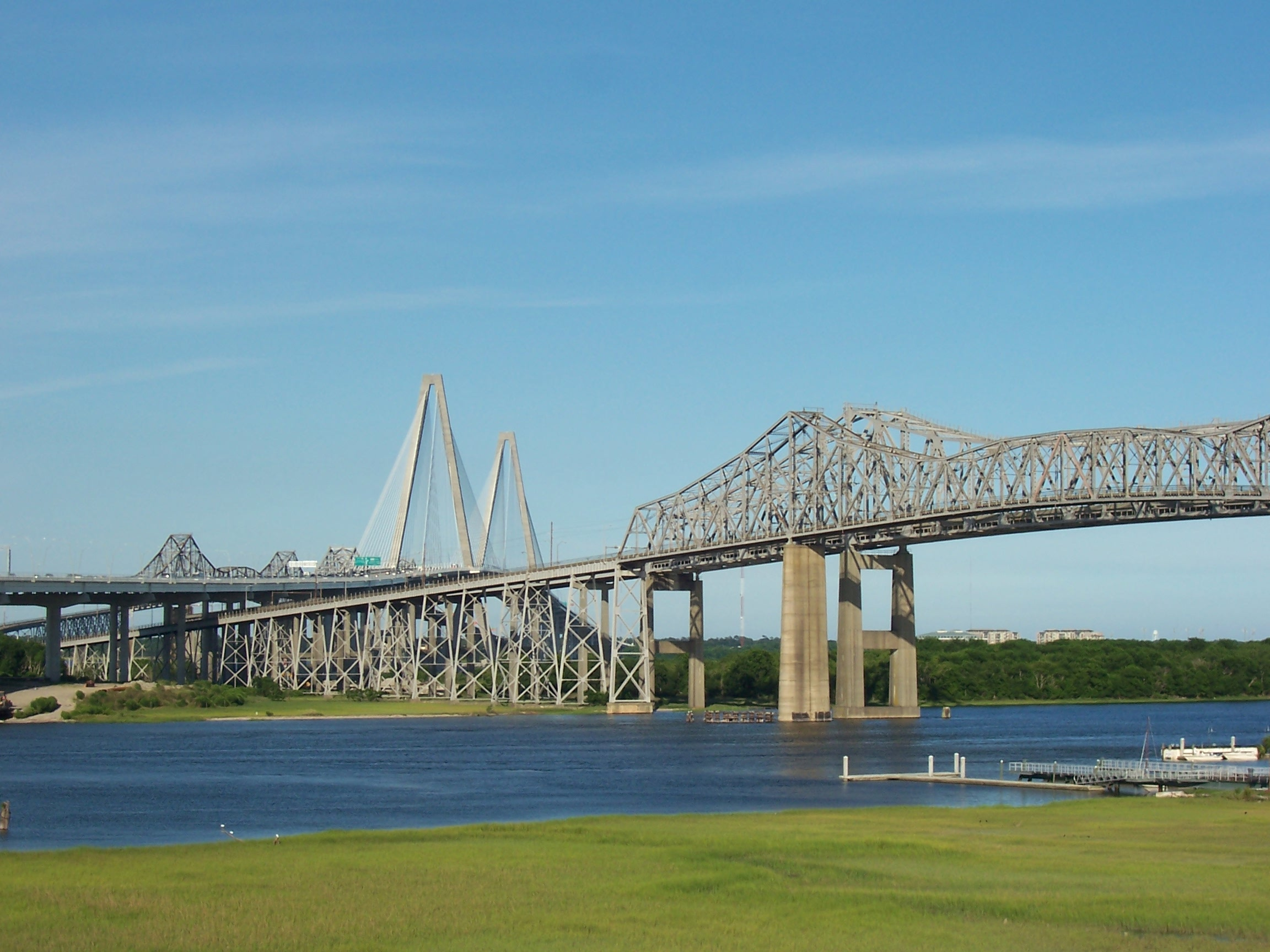
Cooper River Bridges

The Cooper River Bridge Run is a 10-kilometer (6.2 mi) one-way road running event across the Arthur Ravenel Jr. Bridge held in the cities of Mount Pleasant and Charleston in South Carolina, on the first Saturday in April (had been first Sunday of April in 1978, first Saturday in April from 1979 to its last running in 2019, unless that Saturday is Holy Week). The Bridge Run is the only competition in South Carolina sanctioned by USA Track and Field as an elite event. Based on number of race finishers, the event is the third largest 10K and the fifth largest road race in the United States.

The 42nd annual Bridge Run held in April 2019 was the last annual race. Two Bridge Runs were held within six months of each other, the 43rd on September 25, 2021, and the 44th on April 2, 2022. There was no race in 2020 as scheduling logistics precluded an attempt at a summer race even though road races had resumed in the state by June.

== History ==
In the mid-1970s, Medical University of South Carolina employee Dr. Marcus Newberry had visited his Ohio hometown and noticed Bonne Bell had built a running track around their offices to encourage employees' physical fitness. Dr. Newberry wanted a way to encourage fitness in the Charleston Metropolitan region, and believed the best way was to feature an event running through the bridges crossing the Cooper River. The event organisers featured officials from the Charleston Running Club, The Citadel, the Medical University of South Carolina, and the College of Charleston.

South Carolina state senator Dewey Wise introduced legislation to permit the event to be held over the reversible lane on the three-lane Silas Pearman Bridge.

On April 2, 1978, the initial race began from Patriots Point in Mount Pleasant to the White Point Gardens in Charleston's Battery region. Police shortened the initial event to 9,850 meters after the gun had sounded to start the initial Bridge Run. Officials expected 500 runners for the event (with 340 pre-registered), but on race day an additional 600 to 700 runners registered. 766 runners finished. Many dropped out of the race and some were hospitalized for effects from the heat, as there were no water stops on the course. In the tradition of historic Charleston's Civil War and Revolutionary War heritage, a cannon is fired to start the event. The first Kenyan runners to participate were a pair of Baptist College teammates in 1978. Runners from that country have dominated the run since 1993.

Following complaints from heat exhaustion and also from area churches (While Charleston County has some Blue Laws exceptions in Charleston County in deference to the Jewish community, churches on the course complained about the Bridge Run taking place while church services took place), the 1979 event was moved to the last Saturday in March, where it would be held until 1985. One water stop at the terminus of the bridge was added. (Four water stops were on the 2005 course.) The finish line moved to the campus of the College of Charleston. Over 1,350 were entered, with over 1,000 finishing. The 1979 event, the first at 10,000 meters, was the first South Carolina running event with over 1,000 participants. The 1980 finish ended in a tie.

Two consecutive Bridge Runs (1986 and 1987) were marred by illegal runners. In 1986, between 300 and 500 runners did not make the start, which had been delayed 30 minutes because of a vehicular collision on the Pearman Bridge (the only access to the start line) between two shuttle buses carrying runners to the start and an automobile 70 minutes before the scheduled start. They ran down the Pearman, through the cut between the two bridges, and started their run midway through the course, on the Grace.

In 1987, with unusually cold temperatures (start temperature was 39 degrees Fahrenheit (4c) with wind gusts from 20-35 MPH (32–55 km/h), runners kept their warmups instead of displaying their bibs. Officials estimated about 10% of the nearly 7,000 runners who crossed the finish lines were illegal, or "bandit", runners. The bandits were allowed to cross the finish line because officials could not distinguish who was legitimate and who was not.

In 1989, elite runners were warming up ahead of the start line on SC 703 when the cannon fired. Grete Waitz's record time was disallowed, but she was allowed to keep the win, when she was caught ahead of the start line at the cannon.

The 1995 event was the first time over 10,000 runners participated, and women made up over 3,000 of the runners, the first time in North or South Carolina where over 3,000 women finished in a running event.

Transponder timing was instituted in 1997. The 2005-2008 races featured a permanent transponder which the runner could keep was implemented. A D-Tag timing system was used from 2009–10, and from 2011, transponder tags were affixed to competitors' bibs.

The total Bridge Run and Walk participants in 2004 was 29,930. Females accounted for 45.1% of finishers.

In 2012, logistical problems (only one shuttle bus entry point) led to over 10,000 runners being stuck on the shuttle buses on the Ravenel's northbound lanes (which the course uses) where officials could not close the bridge until 7:45 AM, 15 minutes before the scheduled start. The race was delayed to an 8:19 start time for the wheelchair division and an 8:59 start for the elite runners as result.

The last run on the Pearman in 2005 had a 42,000 runner and walker cap (25,000 runners, 17,000 walkers) for 2005, but many did not appear because of inclement weather which marred the start. The current limit is 44,000. The 2012 race featured 36,652 finishers, women dominated with 59.45% (21,789 F vs 14,917 M) of runners.

== Course and event changes ==
The scheduled start time was 10 AM in 1978, 9 AM from 1979 until 1982, 8:30 AM in 1983 until 1986, and 8 AM until 2019. Two unusual start delays caused by the unfamiliar course moved the 1984 start to 9 AM.

The John P. Grace Memorial Bridge had been declared unsafe for heavy trucks over ten tons in 1979, and the South Carolina Department of Transportation eliminated the reversible lane on the Silas N. Pearman Bridge which had been used for the Bridge Run course, as trucks on US Highway 17 South were now required to use that lane, instead of using the Grace. State Senator Wise was able to push for legislation to use the Grace bridge for the Bridge Run, SC Statue 56-5-3880.

In 1983, the Grace Bridge run added a second uphill climb on the Crosstown Overpass connecting the Grace Bridge to US Highway 17 and Interstate 26, and the race finished in front of the United States Federal Building in Marion Square at Meeting Street. With the number of entrants exceeding 2,000, the start moved from Patriots Point in 1984 to SC Highway 703 (Coleman Boulevard) at Shem Creek. This course became the first Bridge Run course to be certified by The Athletics Congress.

Road construction near Market Street in Charleston forced a slight rerouting in 1986, when the Bridge Run was moved to its present date in April unless Easter fell on that weekend.

With entrants exceeding 8,500 and a new 7,000 meter walk added, totaling over 10,000 participants, and tighter restrictions on weight on the Grace Bridge, in 1995 officials returned the Bridge Run to the Pearman bridge, with all three lanes being used, as traffic to Charleston could now be diverted to the Don N. Holt Bridge near Daniel Island on Interstate 526, which had opened in 1992. A new start line on SC 703 near Live Oak Street was positioned with runners passing Coming, Line, King, Market, and Meeting at Marion Square. With congestion becoming a concern, a year later officials moved back the finish to the corner of Meeting and Calhoun in Marion Square, resulting in a corresponding move back of the start on SC 703.

In 2000, the Bridge Run course went through a complete overhaul with the start further back on SC 703 near the shopping center, giving runners a 3,000 meter run on SC 703 before joining the walkers at the foot of the first span of the Pearman, then crossing the Crosstown Overpass, King Street, Calhoun Street, and finishing at Alexander. The course eliminated the use of Meeting Street, which had been used as the primary street in the past. This course would be used until 2005, when the Pearman and Grace bridges closed.

In 2003, a youth event was held on the Friday at Hampton Park to expand the festivities.

Major alterations to the course were necessary for 2006 as USA Track and Field had to measure a new course to reflect the opening of the Arthur Ravenel, Jr. Bridge and construction on the Ansonborough Fields complex resulted in the moving of the finish line away from Alexander Street, where it had been set since 2000, and a new finish line at George Street and Meeting Street, across from the Toronto Dominion Arena in Charleston, was established. The finish festival was held at Marion Square, which is located a short walk as runners made the cooldown from the finish line.

The start line was slightly moved but remains near the shopping center, and proceeds on SC 703 for 3,000 meters before approaching the northbound exit ramp to SC 703 (run southbound, towards Charleston, the opposite direction of normal vehicular traffic), with the runners proceeding on the Arthur Ravenel, Jr. Bridge southbound on the four northbound lanes (the four southbound lanes on the bridge are not used; furthermore, the bike-pedestrian lane (which is aligned with the northbound lanes, but just off to East Bay Street and is not part of the course) is reserved for use by emergency staff) for 3,200 meters before exiting the bridge using the two-lane Meeting Street entrance ramp (runners are running the opposite direction of normal vehicular traffic), turning left on Meeting for 2,000 meters before, making a right at the Visitor Center at John Street, then a quick left at King Street, before turning left at Wentworth Street, before a final run up Meeting Street the other direction before the finish line.

Two potential forms of cheating near the finish were dealt with using fencing at Marion Square at King Street (the finish festival site), and a sponsor parking a tractor-trailer at the intersection of Meeting and John to force runners to make the turn back to King. Furthermore, the live bands which play at the finish festival will be heard twice, as runners pass through Marion Square the first time on King Street, and after crossing the finish line and cooling down.

Concerns over bottlenecking by walkers on course who entered the bridge walk at the 3,000 meter mark on Coleman Boulevard at Patriots Point (the original start line) and the WCBD studios eliminated the 7,000 meter walk, and required walkers to proceed through the entire 10,000 meter run starting in 2006. However, the rule was not as enforced as some had thought. Some walkers (and lower-seeded runners too) lined up on the sidewalks on SC 703 from Shem Creek to that studio, which is at the foot of the exit ramp from the bridge, instead of lining behind all runners at the start line, which was the instruction given to participants in the 2006 event in order to prevent incidents.

Another rule change in 2006 required runners to be seeded by time; elite and invited runners were ahead, then runners in the under 40 minute category, then 40-50, 50-60, past one hour, and walkers. The main goal was to prevent certain bottlenecking, although some bottlenecking did take place at the start line because of the transponder timing system.

The 2006 event also debuted the wheelchair category as a competitive event; twelve wheelchair and crankchair athletes competed in the event, which started at 7:30 AM.

For 2010 the turn from Meeting to King was changed from John Street to Wolfe Street, and to allow the bars to have bands perform.

Starting with the 2011 event, a wave start system is utilized to better handle crowding in the Mount Pleasant.

== Competitors ==
Initially, the race attracted national-level runners. Benji Durden, whose opportunity to make the Olympic team was denied by President Jimmy Carter in 1980, won the first run. Frank Shorter and Ruth Wysocki ran in the early 1980s and Olympians Mark Conover and Janis Klecker were participants in the early 1990s. The race has featured top level international competitors, including Olympic medalists Grete Waitz, Catherine Ndereba, and Elana Meyer.

Outside of elite runners, the run has also featured people prominent in other cultural spheres. Television personality Oprah Winfrey, running under a pseudonym, finished the 1994 race (3,839th with a time of 55:48 min). Actor Bill Murray fired the cannon for the 1997 Bridge Run and ran the event. In 2011, then-NASCAR Nationwide Series driver Aric Almirola, his wife Janice, and two members of the JR Motorsports #88 team from the 2011 season participated during an off-week in that series, and former state Governor Mark Sanford and two of his children also participated. Irish Olympic runner Sean Dollman, who retired after taking a job at the College of Charleston, came out of retirement at the Bridge Run and won the Dr. Marcus Newberry Award for best runner residing in the Charleston metropolitan region (Charleston, Berkeley, Dorchester counties) in 2002. In 2012, Zeddie Little became an internet meme known as the "ridiculously photogenic guy" after having a photo of him taken by Will King while running the race.

== Past winners ==
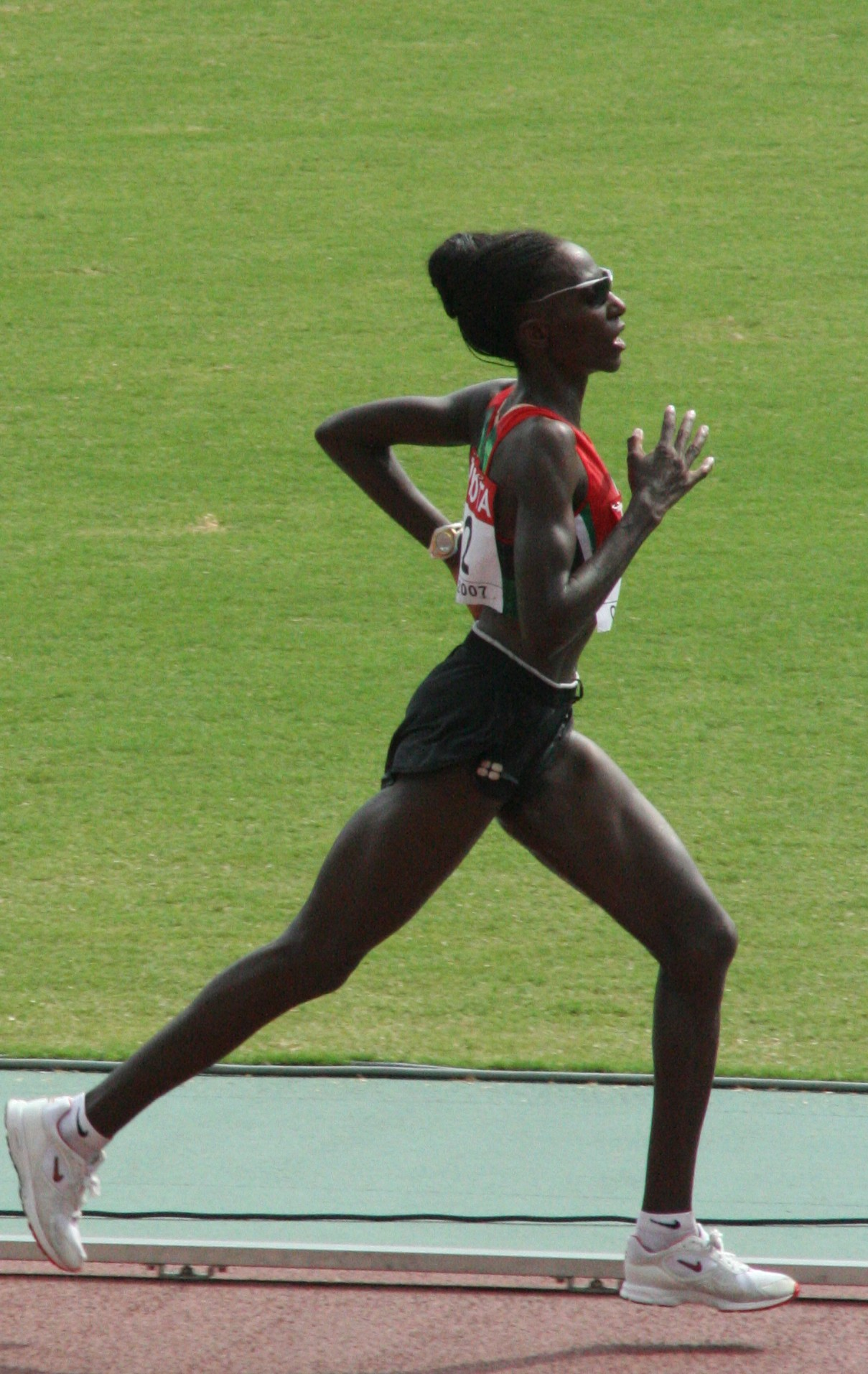
Kenya's Catherine Ndereba had three straight wins from 2000 to 2002.

Key: Course record Short course

Edition	Year	Men's winner	Time (m:s)	Women's winner	Time (m:s)
1st	1978	Benji Durden (USA)	30:22	Lisa Lorrain (USA)	39:39
2nd	1979	Avery Goode (USA)	32:55	Marty Long (USA)	40:10
3rd	1980	Kim Burke (USA); Steve Littleton (USA)	31:26	Michele Moore (USA)	41:29
4th	1981	Marc Embler (USA)	30:54	Kiki Sweigart (USA)	35:10
5th	1982	Mark Donahue (USA)	30:28	Sallie Driggers (USA)	37:21
6th	1983	David Branch (USA)	29:28	Mary Copeland (USA)	38:09
7th	1984	David Branch (USA)	29:25	Brenda Webb (USA)	34:09
8th	1985	Mike O'Reilly (IRL)	29:28	Christina Cahill (GBR)	34:08
9th	1986	Hans Koeleman (NED)	29:29	Lesley Lehane (USA)	33:37
10th	1987	Paul Cummings (USA)	30:19	Mary Ellen McGowan (USA)	34:31
11th	1988	Ashley Johnson (USA)	29:56	Carla Borovicka (USA)	34:38
12th	1989	Ashley Johnson (USA)	29:48	Grete Waitz (NOR)	33:29
13th	1990	Samson Obwocha (KEN)	29:20	Shelly Steely (USA)	32:57
14th	1991	Jeff Cannada (USA)	29:38	Kim Bird (CAN)	34:49
15th	1992	Dominic Kirui (KEN)	28:24	Jill Boltz (GBR)	32:34
16th	1993	Paul Bitok (KEN)	28:31	Sabrina Dornhoefer (USA)	33:53
17th	1994	Simon Karori (KEN)	28:35	Elaine Van Blunk (USA)	34:01
18th	1995	Joseph Kimani (KEN)	27:49	Laura LaMena (USA)	33:58
19th	1996	Joseph Kamau (KEN)	28:32	Liz McColgan (GBR)	31:41
20th	1997	Paul Koech (KEN)	27:57	Elana Meyer (RSA)	31:19
21st	1998	Thomas Nyariki (KEN)	29:58	Elana Meyer (RSA)	32:46
22nd	1999	Lazarus Nyakeraka (KEN)	28:40	Eunice Sagero (KEN)	33:18
23rd	2000	James Kimutai Kosgei (KEN)	27:40	Catherine Ndereba (KEN)	31:42
24th	2001	James Kimutai Kosgei (KEN)	28:45	Catherine Ndereba (KEN)	32:33
25th	2002	John Thuo Itati (KEN)	28:06	Catherine Ndereba (KEN)	31:53
26th	2003	Thomas Nyariki (KEN)	28:57	Edna Kiplagat (KEN)	33:41
27th	2004	Luke Kipkosgei (KEN)	28:13	Sally Barsosio (KEN)	32:28
28th	2005	Linus Maiyo (KEN)	29:30	Olga Romanova (RUS)	34:04
29th	2006	Abraham Chebii (KEN)	28:16	Sally Barsosio (KEN)	33:35
30th	2007	Richard Kiplagat (KEN)	28:35	Rehima Kedir (ETH)	32:05
31st	2008	Robert Kiprotich Letting (KEN)	28:46.8	Leah Malot (KEN)	33:22.6
32nd	2009	Tilahun Regassa (ETH)	28:24	Amane Gobena Gemeda (ETH)	32:25
33rd	2010	Simon Ndirangu (KEN)	27:49	Meskerem Assefa (ETH)	32:31
34th	2011	Lelisa Desisa (ETH)	28:59	Alene Shewarge Amare (ETH)	33:06
35th	2012	Solomon Deksisa (ETH)	29:37	Janet Cherobon-Bawcom (USA)	33:01
36th	2013	Simon Ndirangu (KEN)	28:06	Hiwott Ayalew (ETH)	32:18
37th	2014	Birhan Nebebew (ETH)	28:38	Azmera Gebru (ETH)	32:13
38th	2015	Dominic Ondoro (KEN)	29:22	Cynthia Limo (KEN)	32:18
39th	2016	Dominic Ondoro (KEN)	29:00	Monicah Wanjuhi Ngige (KEN)	32:56
40th	2017	Shadrack Kipchirchir (USA)	28:12	Monicah Wanjuhi Ngige (KEN)	32:40
41st	2018	Shadrack Kipchirchir (USA)	28:25	Gotytom Gebreslase (ETH)	32:19
42nd	2019	Silas Kipruto (KEN)	27:58	Monicah Wanjuhi Ngige (KEN)	31:37
43rd	2021	Edward Cheserek (KEN)	28:26	Nell Rojas (USA)	31:52
44th	2022	David Bett (KEN)	28:17	Biruktayit Degefa (ETH)	31:23
45th	2023	Athanas Kioko (KEN)	29:03	Cynthia Jerotich Limo (KEN)	32:29
46th	2024	Ali Adilmana (ETH)	27:53	Sarah Naibei (KEN)	31:41
47th	2025	Peter Njeru (KEN)	28:27	Sarah Naibei (KEN)	31:49
48th	2026	Edwin Kurgat (KEN)		Evelyn Kemboi (KEN)	

No race in 2020. 43rd Bridge Run run in September 2021 because of pandemic.
