= Mamitu Daska =

Ethiopian long-distance runner

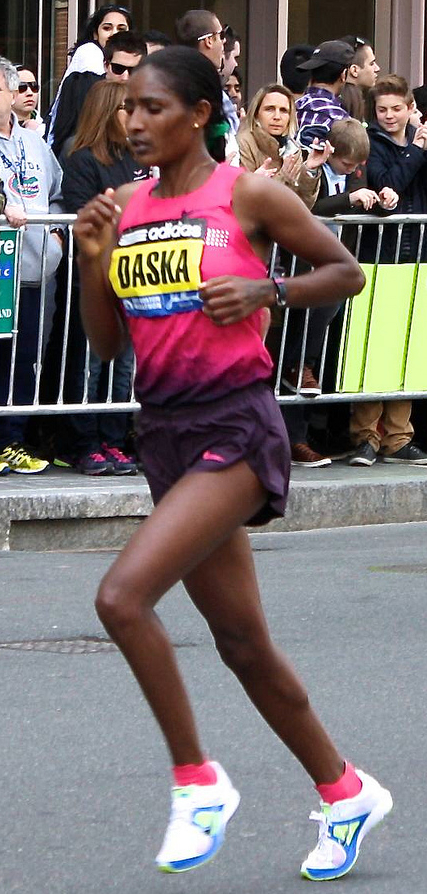
- Mamitu Daska at the 2013 Boston Marathon

Medal record

Representing Ethiopia

All-Africa Games
Gold medal – first place	2015 Brazzaville	Half marathon
Silver medal – second place	2011 Maputo	Half marathon

Mamitu Daska Molisa (born 16 October 1983), also known as Mamitu Deska, is an Ethiopian long-distance runner who specialises in road running events, including the marathon. She is a two-time team silver medallist at the IAAF World Cross Country Championships. She has won the Dubai Marathon and Houston Marathon and has a personal best of 2:21:59 hours for the distance.

== Career ==
Mamitu Daska was born in Liteshoa in Ethiopia's Oromia Region. She gained representation with Elite Sports Management International in 2006 and began competing in road races in Spain that year. She won her first races the following year, taking the Route du Vin Half Marathon title and the Sedan-Charleville 24.3 km race in France. Among her other outings that year, she was runner-up at the 20 kilomètres de Maroilles, third at the Parkersburg Half Marathon and fourth places at the 20 Kilomètres de Paris and Falmouth Road Race.

Running for Oromia Police, she was sixth at the Jan Meda Cross Country in February 2008 – a finish which gained her selection for the 2009 IAAF World Cross Country Championships. She finished twelfth at the world event held in Amman and she was part of the silver medal-winning Ethiopian women's team. She travelled to the United States in May and won the Bolder Boulder 10K and was second at the Freihofer's Run for Women. That August she won the 7-mile Falmouth race and set a personal best at the New York City Half Marathon, coming in second place behind Paula Radcliffe in a time of 1:11:04 hours. Mamitu made her debut over the marathon distance in September and performed well, recording a time of 2:26:38 hours to take third place at the high-profile Berlin Marathon. More improvements came at the Delhi Half Marathon, where she finished the race in 68:07 minutes for fourth place. She ended the year with a win at the Obudu Ranch International Mountain Race in Nigeria.

Mamitu began 2010 with a career best run of 2:24:19 hours to take a marathon victory on her second outing over the distance – her win at the Dubai Marathon earned her $250,000 in prize money. Her road success translated to cross country as she came second at the Ethiopian championship behind Meselech Melkamu. At the 2010 IAAF World Cross Country Championships in Poland in March she improved upon her performance from the previous year, coming eighth and again taking the team silver with Ethiopia. She turned to the American road circuit later that year and won the Bolder Boulder, was the runner-up at the Lilac Bloomsday Run, and had podium finishes at the Bay to Breakers and Freihofer's 5K. She was invited as one of the elite women's runners at the 2010 Chicago Marathon and was sixth in a time of 2:28:29 hours. As in 2010, she closed her year at the Obudu Race and was second on this occasion.

She posted a time of 2:26:33 hours to win the Houston Marathon in January 2011, completing an Ethiopian sweep of the top two with Ashu Kasim. She was runner-up at both the Bolder Boulder and the Bay to Breakers races, later going on to win for the first time at the Freihofer's Run for Women. Her biggest achievement that year came at the Frankfurt Marathon, where she bettered the course record by nearly 90 seconds with her time of 2:21:59 hours. She came ninth at the 2012 Dubai Marathon, although her finishing time of 2:24:24 was among her fastest performances. She defended her title at the Freihofers' Run for Women, finishing some distance ahead of runner-up Ashu Kasim. This marked the start of a dominant run on the American road circuit, where she won the Bolder Boulder, Lilac Bloomsday Run, Bay to Breakers, Peachtree Road Race and Boilermaker Road Race all in one season. She returned to defend her Frankfurt Marathon title, but was beaten into third, while her compatriot Meselech Melkamu took the win.

She returned to Houston in 2013 for the half marathon section of the race and won in a time of 69:53 minutes. She was only 12th at the 2013 Boston Marathon, but took victories at the New York Mini 10K and BAA 10K (setting a best of 31:44 minutes). Her best marathon race that year was at the Frankfurt Marathon, where she was fourth in 2:23:23 hours.

She was a podium finisher coming in third place at the TCS New York City Marathon on November 5, 2017 with a time of 2:28:08.

In May 2018, Daska won the Bolder Boulder for a record sixth time.
