= Allonnes, Sarthe =

Allonnes
- Commune
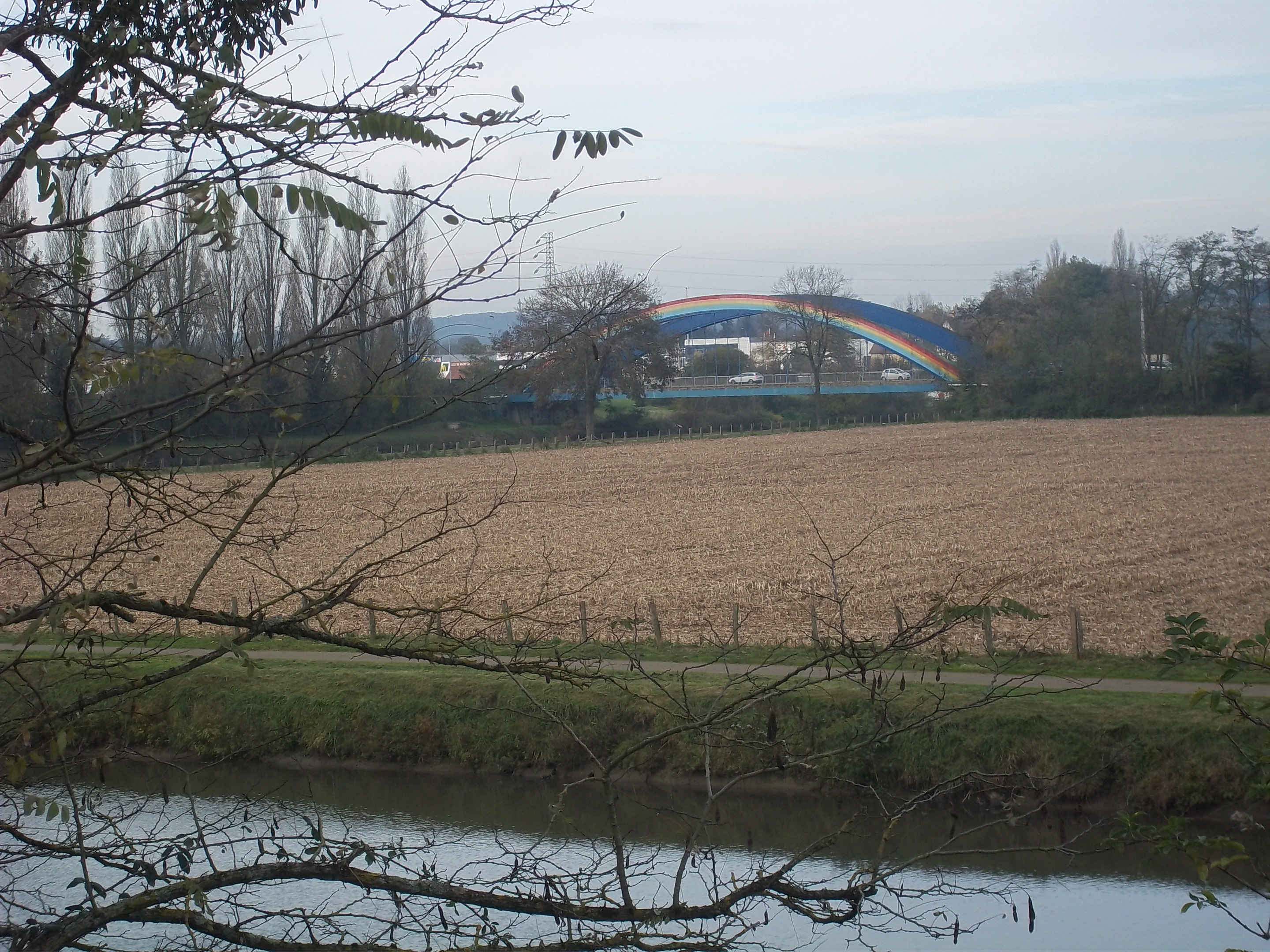
- The north entrance of the town, bridge over the River Sarthe

- Coat of arms
- Location of Allonnes
- Location within France Location within Pays de la Loire
- Coordinates: 47°58′07″N 0°09′38″E
- Country: France
- Region: Pays de la Loire
- Department: Sarthe
- Arrondissement: Le Mans
- Canton: Le Mans-7
- Intercommunality: Le Mans Métropole

Government
  - Mayor (2020–2026): Gilles Leproust
- Area^{1}: 18.07 km^{2} (6.98 sq mi)
- Highest elevation: 82 m (269 ft)
- Lowest elevation: 38 m (125 ft)
- Population (2023): 10,739
  - Density: 594.3/km^{2} (1,539/sq mi)
- Demonym(s): Allonnais, Allonnaise
- Time zone: UTC+01:00 (CET)
  - Summer (DST): UTC+02:00 (CEST)
- INSEE/Postal code: 72003 /72700
- ^{1} French Land Register data, which excludes lakes, ponds, glaciers > 1 km^{2} (0.386 sq mi or 247 acres) and river estuaries.

Allonnes (French pronunciation: [alɔn]) is a commune in the Sarthe department in the region of Pays de la Loire in north-western France.

== Geography ==
Allonnes is located in the southwestern city suburbs of Le Mans, on the banks of the Sarthe River. Covering 18.07 km^{2} (6.98 sq mi), its territory is the largest in its canton.

== Population ==
Historical population
Year	Pop.	±% p.a.
1968	11,570	—
1975	15,852	+4.60%
1982	15,623	−0.21%
1990	13,561	−1.75%
1999	12,332	−1.05%
2007	11,152	−1.25%
2012	11,097	−0.10%
2017	11,098	+0.00%
2023	10,739	−0.55%
2024	11,108	+3.44%
1		—
Source: INSEE

== See also ==
- Communes of the Sarthe department
