= Bolder Boulder =

Annual 10K race in Boulder, Colorado

- Location: Boulder, Colorado (United States)
- Distance: 10 kilometers (6.2 mi)
- Primary sponsor: FirstBank
- Established: 1979
- Course records: Men: 27:52 (Kenya) Josephat Machuka (1995); Women: 31:51 (Kenya) Grace Nawowuna (2025)
- Website: Official website
- Participants: ~54,000

The Bolder Boulder (styled as BOLDERBoulder and previously BolderBOULDER) is an annual 10-kilometer run in Boulder, Colorado. The 2007 race featured over 54,000 runners, walkers, and wheelchair racers, making it the second largest 10k race in the US and the fifth largest road race in the world. It has one of the largest non-marathon prize purses in road racing.

The race culminates at the University of Colorado's Folsom Field with a Memorial Day Tribute with one of the largest Memorial Day gatherings in the United States. Organizers have dedicated three starting waves to current and former members of the U.S. armed forces.

On March 16, 2020, organizers of the Bolder Boulder race initially decided to postpone the race, usually held on Memorial Day, until Labor Day due to COVID-19. On June 1, organizers then decided to cancel the 2020 race entirely.

From 2002-2005, the presenting sponsor of the race was Celestial Seasonings. From 2008-2012, the named sponsor was Dick's Sporting Goods. The 2025 presenting sponsor was Runners Roost.

Many awards are given based on finish times within defined age groups. Among them is the "Ageless Wonder" category, awarded to runners who finish the 10K in less time than their age (Ex. 47-year-old who finishes in 46 minutes).

== Past winners ==
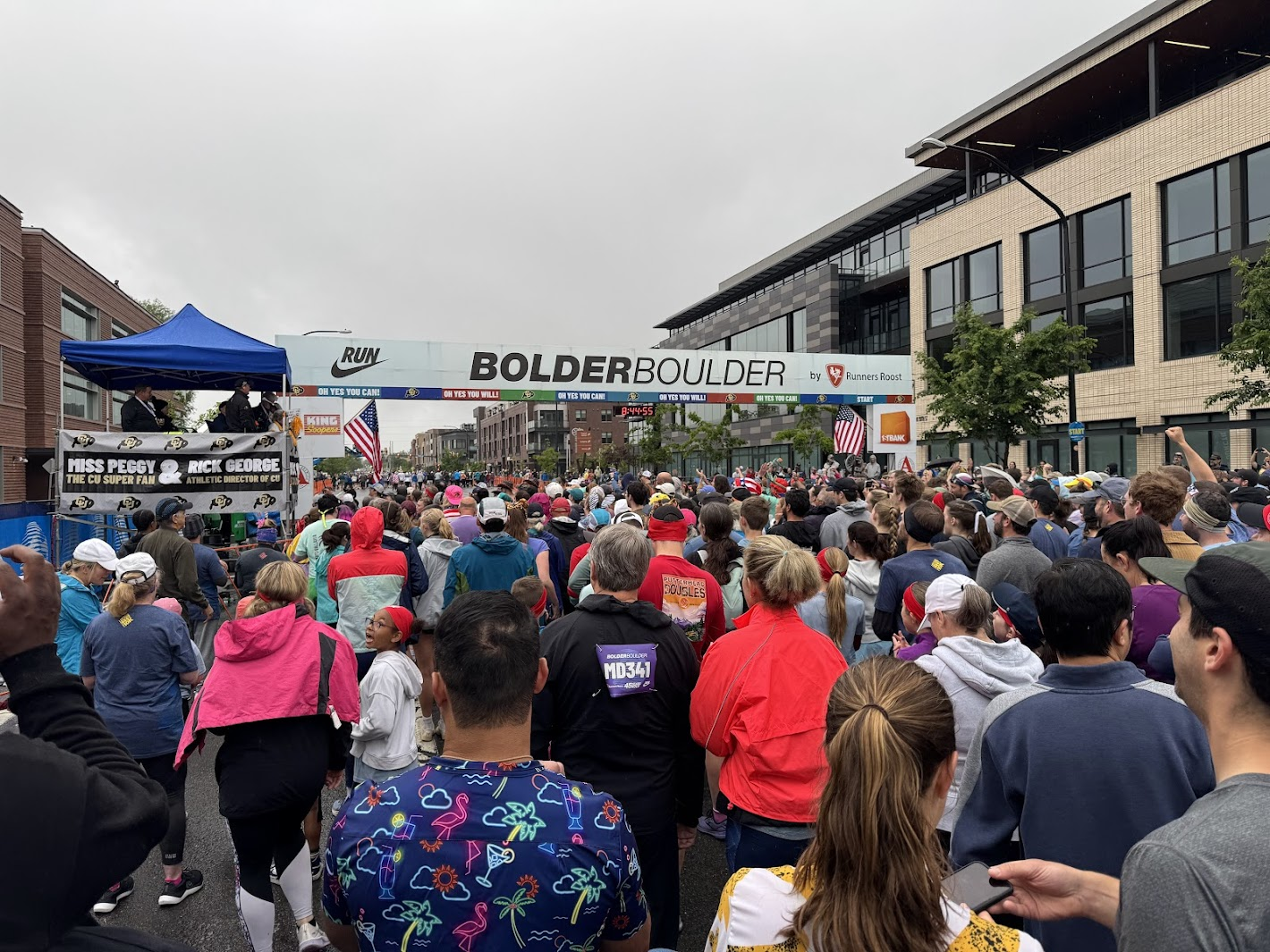
The starting line of the race in 2025

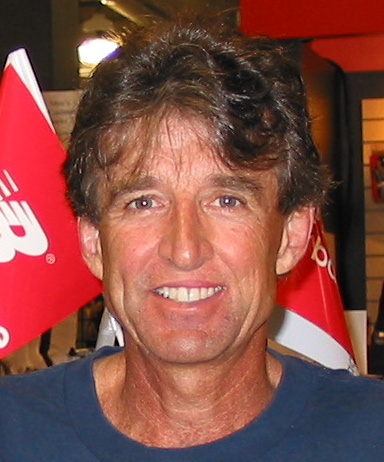
Frank Shorter won the men's race in 1981.

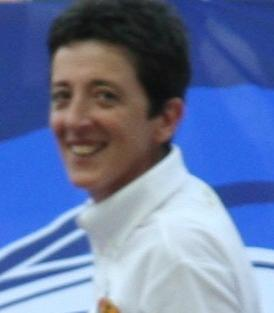
Portugal's Rosa Mota is a five-time winner of the race.

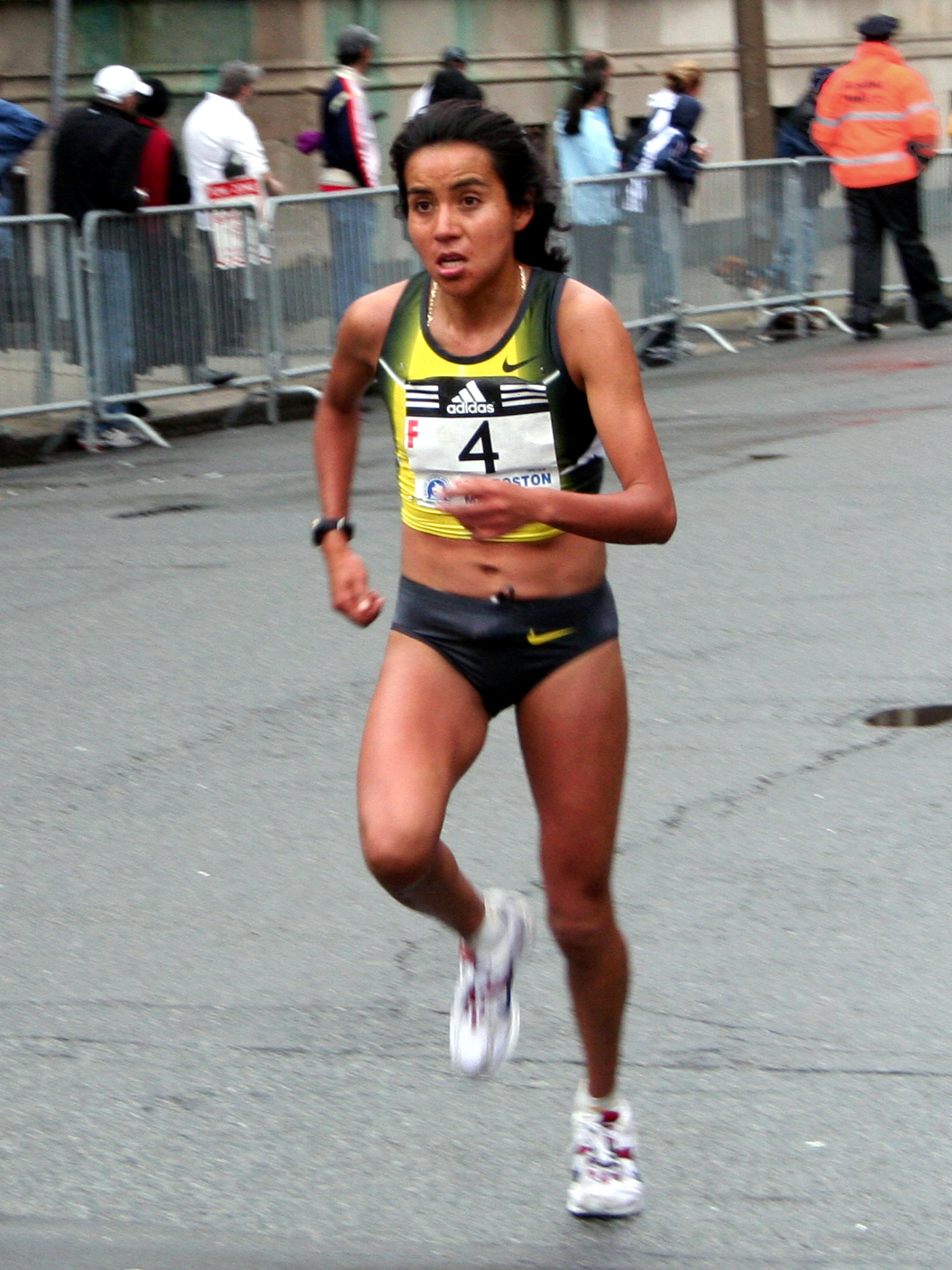
Madaí Pérez won the 2004 women's race.

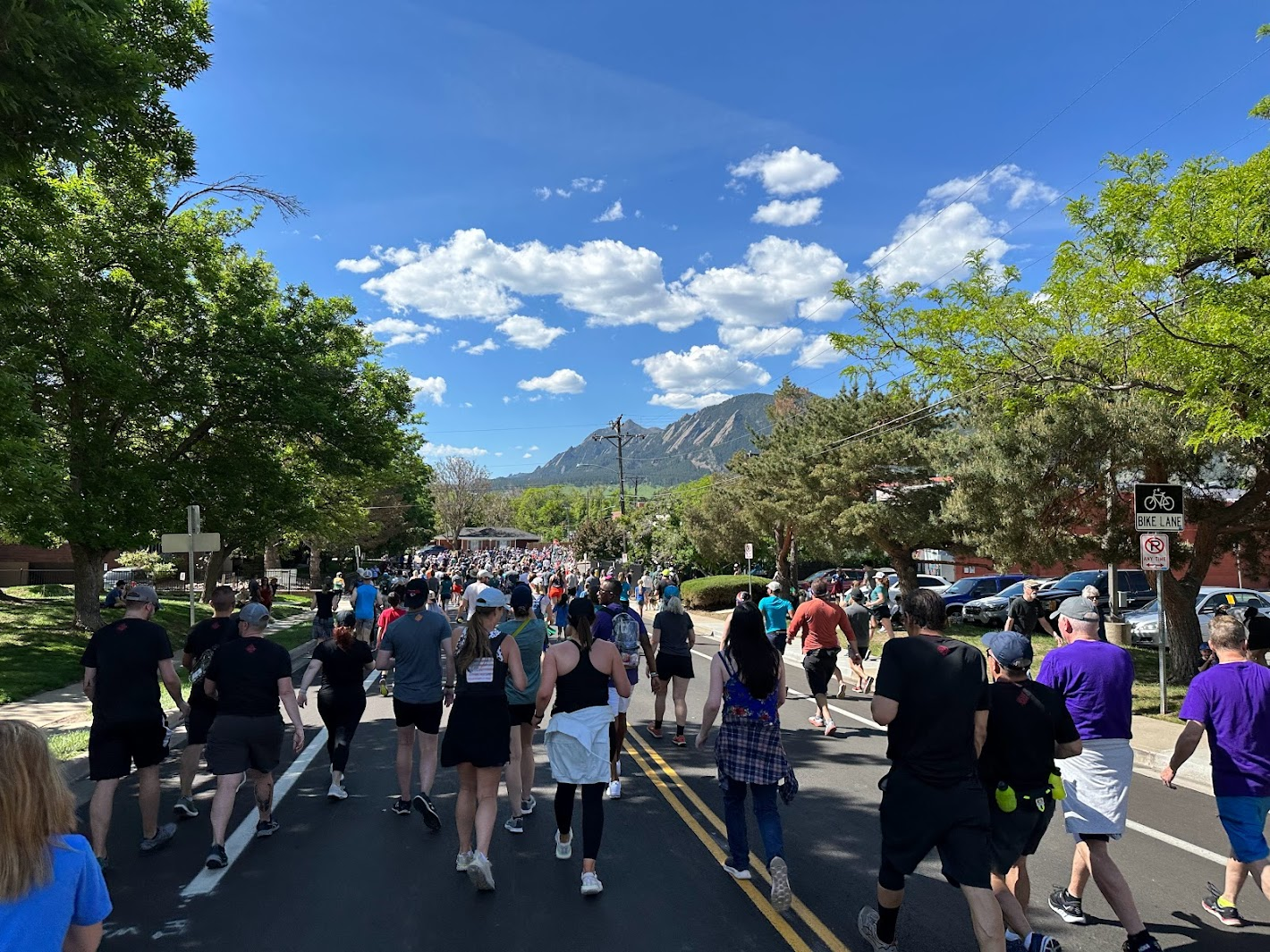
A section of the 2023 race with a view of the Flatirons

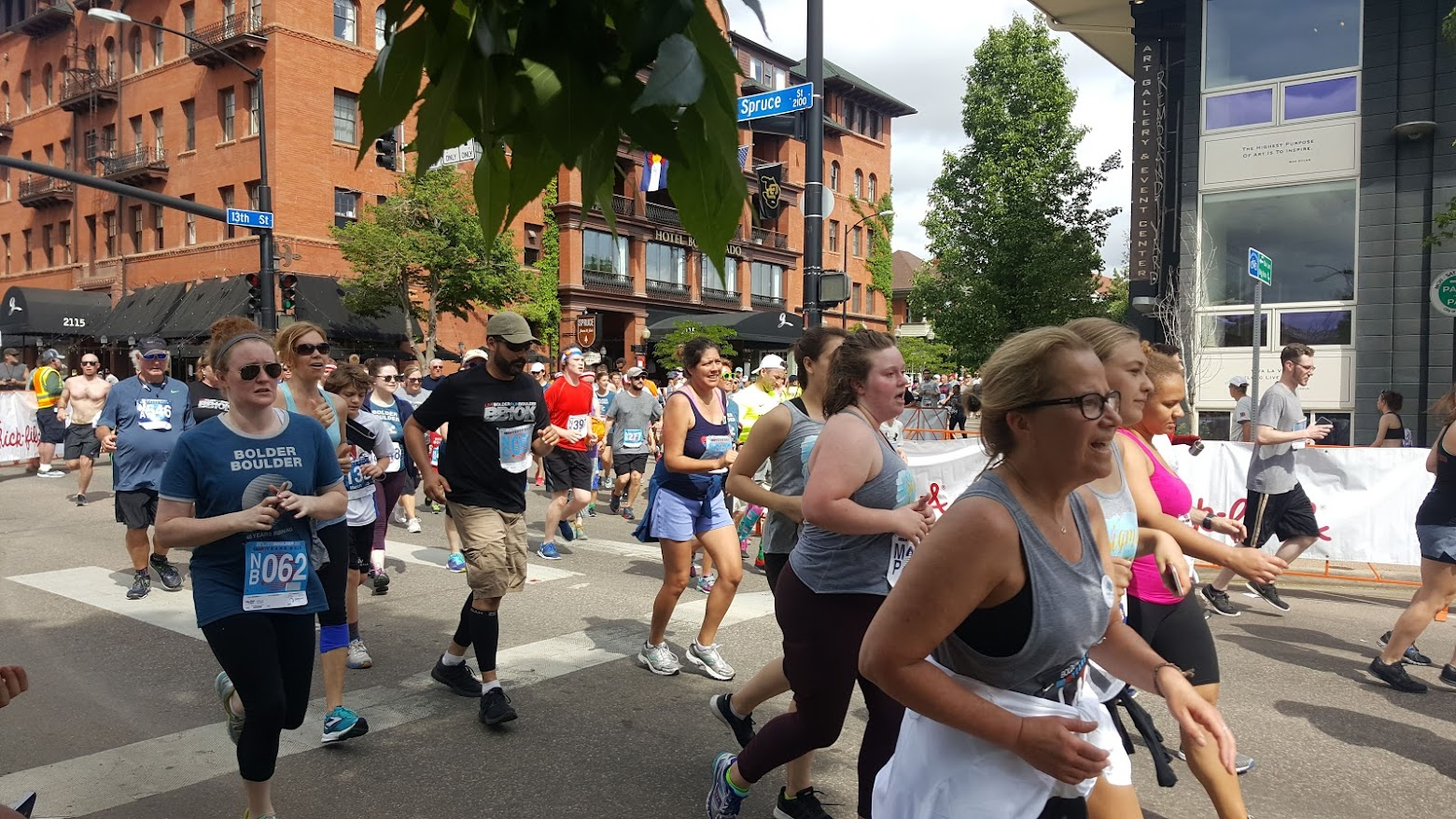
Race participants by Hotel Boulderado in 2018

Key: Course record

Edition	Year	Men's winner	Time (h:m:s)	Women's winner	Time (h:m:s)
1st	1979	Ric Rojas (USA)	29:43	Sandy Simmons (USA)	39:55
2nd	1980	Marc Hunter (USA)	30:42	Ruth Hamilton (USA)	38:12
3rd	1981	Frank Shorter (USA)	29:28	Ellen Hart Peña (USA)	34:54
4th	1982	Rodolfo Gómez (MEX)	28:51	Anne Audain (NZL)	32:38
5th	1983	Mark Scrutton (ENG)	28:51	Ellen Hart (USA)	34:46
6th	1984	Herb Lindsay (USA)	29:09	Rosa Mota (POR)	34:03
7th	1985	Paul Davies-Hale (ENG)	29:04	Rosa Mota (POR)	33:59
8th	1986	Arturo Barrios (MEX)	28:46	Rosa Mota (POR)	33:54
9th	1987	Arturo Barrios (MEX)	28:46	Nancy Tinari (CAN)	33:59
10th	1988	Rolando Vera (ECU)	29:06	Rosa Mota (POR)	34:41
11th	1989	Arturo Barrios (MEX)	28:59	Ingrid Kristiansen (NOR)	33:59
12th	1990	Martin Pitayo (MEX)	28:48	Rosa Mota (POR)	33:14
13th	1991	Thomas Osano (KEN)	29:01	Delillah Asiago (KEN)	33:32
14th	1992	Thomas Osano (KEN)	28:40	Jill Boltz (ENG)	33:57
15th	1993	Arturo Barrios (MEX)	29:04	Uta Pippig (GER)	33:39
16th	1994	Armando Quintanilla (MEX)	29:31	Nadia Prasad (FRA)	33:28
17th	1995	Josephat Machuka (KEN)	27:52	Delillah Asiago (KEN)	32:13
18th	1996	Simon Rono (KEN)	28:28	Elana Meyer (RSA)	33:22
19th	1997	Hezron Otwori (KEN)	28:55	Libbie Hickman (USA)	33:25
20th	1998	Simon Rono (KEN)	28:50	Jane Omoro (KEN)	33:26
21st	1999	Birhanu Adane (ETH)	29:00	Lidia Șimon (ROM)	32:30
22nd	2000	Joseph Kimani (KEN)	28:55	Derartu Tulu (ETH)	33:09
23rd	2001	James Koskei (KEN)	29:00	Deena Drossin (USA)	33:25
24th	2002	Tom Nyariki (KEN)	29:08	Deena Drossin (USA)	33:12
25th	2003	Dejene Berhanu (ETH)	28:54	Deena Drossin (USA)	33:17
26th	2004	Paul Koech (KEN)	29:19	Madaí Pérez (MEX)	34:24
27th	2005	Gudisa Shentema (ETH)	29:21	Elva Dryer (USA)	32:51
28th	2006	Birhanu Adane (ETH)	29:37	Sara Slattery (USA)	33:42
29th	2007	Ridouane Harroufi (MAR)	29:52	Edna Kiplagat (KEN)	33:42
30th	2008	Ridouane Harroufi (MAR)	28:32	Millicent Gathoni (KEN)	32:49
31st	2009	Tilahun Regassa (ETH)	28:17	Mamitu Daska (ETH)	32:48
32nd	2010	Lelisa Desisa (ETH)	29:17	Mamitu Daska (ETH)	32:28
33rd	2011	Belete Assefa (ETH)	29:22	Lineth Chepkurui (KEN)	32:29
34th	2012	Allan Kiprono (KEN)	29:53	Mamitu Daska (ETH)	33:05
35th	2013	Allan Kiprono (KEN)	29:28	Merima Mohammed (ETH)	33:58
36th	2014	Afewerki Berhane (ERI)	29:11	Mamitu Daska (ETH)	32:21
37th	2015	Belete Assefa (ETH)	29:04	Meskerem Assefa (ETH)	33:31
38th	2016	Isaac Kiprono (KEN)	29:12	Amane Gobena (ETH)	33:39
39th	2017	Gabriel Geay (TZA)	29:02	Mamitu Daska (ETH)	32:44
40th	2018	Getaneh Molla (ETH)	29:18	Mamitu Daska (ETH)	32:37
41st	2019	Bernard Ngeno (KEN)	28:29	Hiwot Yemmer (ETH)	32:49
42nd	2022	Leonard Korir (USA)	29:28	Aliphine Tuliamuk (USA)	32:58
43rd	2023	Conner Mantz (USA)	29:08	Emily Durgin (USA)	33:24
44th	2024	Conner Mantz (USA)	29:12	Grace Nawowuna (KEN)	32:45
45th	2025	Conner Mantz (USA)	28:21	Grace Nawowuna (KEN)	31:51
46th	2026	Patrick Kiprop (KEN)	28:35	Rebecca Mwangi (KEN)	32:33

== Finisher numbers ==
Number of finishers and registrants each year
Year	Finishers	Registrants
1979	n/a	2,700
1980	4,324	5,280
1981	7,261	9,000
1982	11,177	n/a
1983	14,093	16,550
1984	15,783	17,400
1985	16,826	n/a
1986	17,926	n/a
1987	19,068	n/a
1988	14,943	n/a
1989	19,763	n/a
1990	23,849	26,470
1991	28,386	31,103
1992	29,530	35,080
1993	31,712	n/a
1994	31,816	35,750
1995	25,009	n/a
1996	34,495	n/a
1997	34,504	n/a
1998	37,345	40,145
1999	39,099	n/a
2000	40,546	n/a
2001	40,743	n/a
2002	42,240	45,822
2003	44,613	48,242
2004	43,772	47,454
2005	42,158	n/a
2006	43,388	n/a
2007	43,829	50,816
2008	47,794	n/a
2009	47,783	n/a
2010	48,430	n/a
2011	49,201	54,544
2012	46,535	n/a
2013	43,434	n/a
2014	45,765	52,115
2015	45,107	n/a
2016	44,763	n/a
2017	44,997	n/a
2018	46,170	51,051
2019	42,587	n/a
2020	cancelled	cancelled
2021	remote	remote
2022	34,224	n/a
2023	35,007	40,044
2024	41,491	48,318
2025	45,055	52,185
2026	47,645	53,801

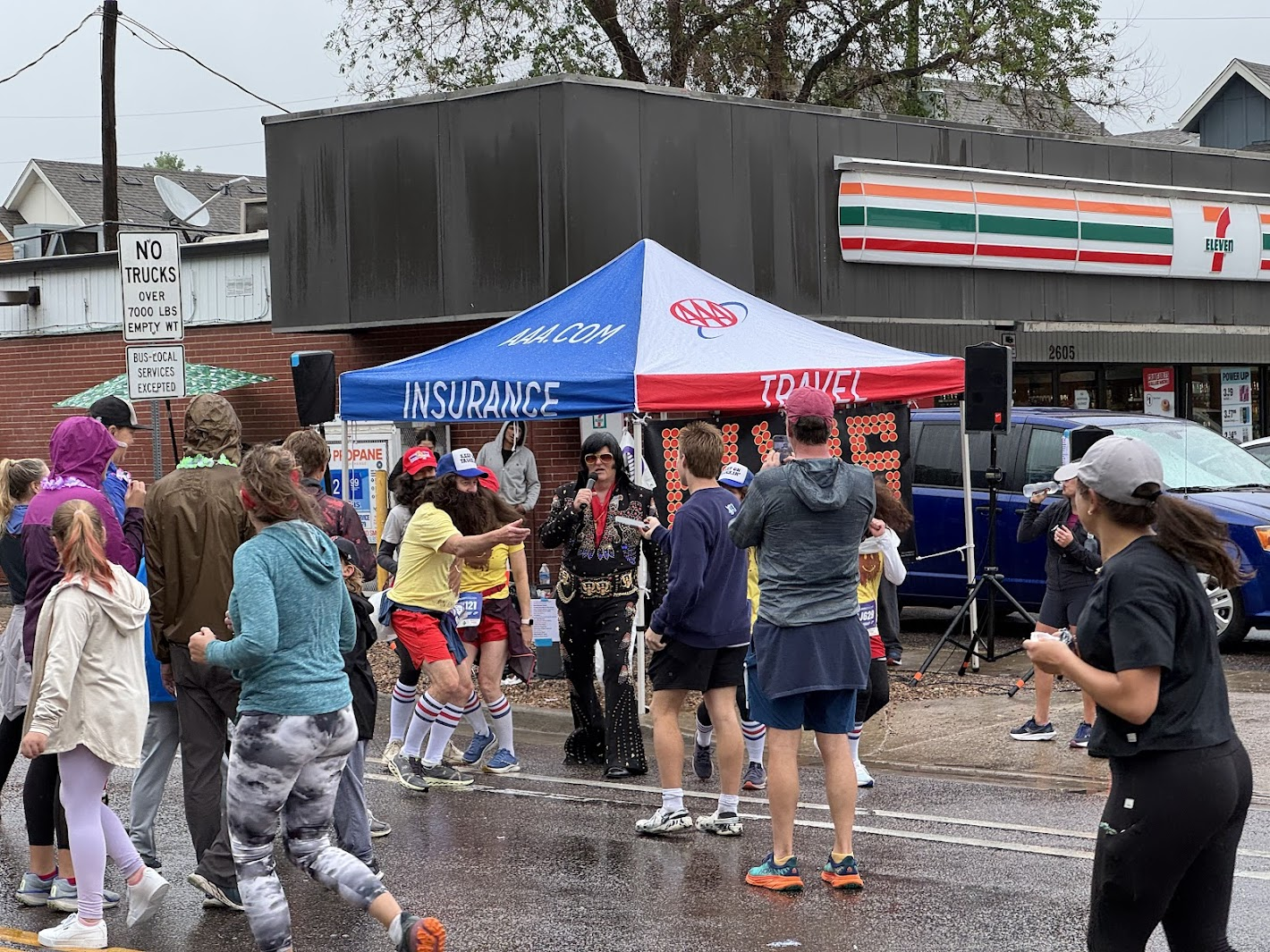
An Elvis Impersonator at the race in 2025

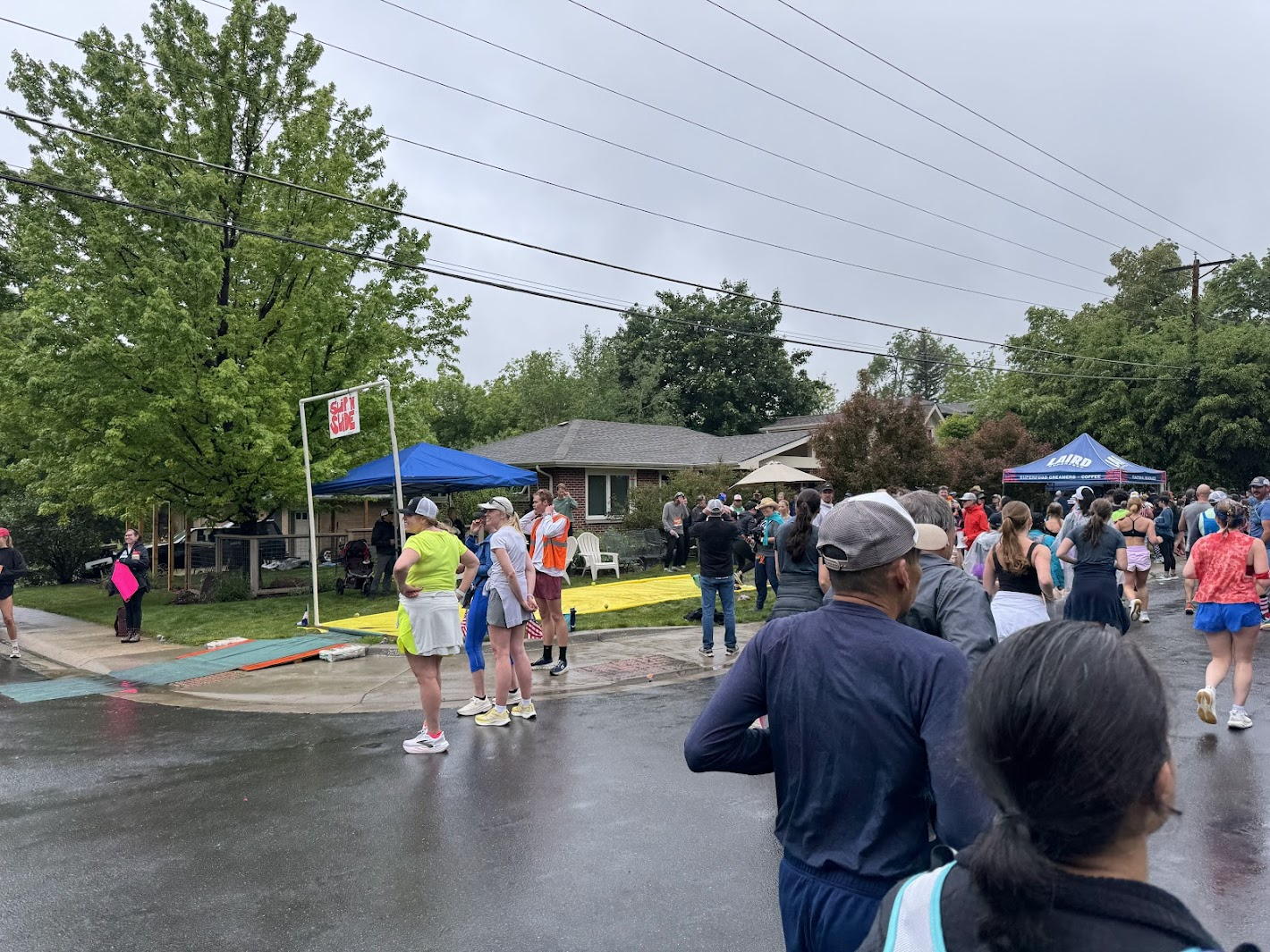
A Slip 'N Slide Station at the race in 2025

== Entertainment ==
The Bolder Boulder race course typically features entertainment along the route, supplied by local companies and individuals. Entertainment can include belly dancers, Elvis impersonators, local bands, disc jockeys, and the Bateria Alegria percussion ensemble from the Boulder Samba School. Aside from the performers, there is often a Slip 'N Slide, trampoline and bounce house for race participants to enjoy. In addition to the official water stations provided by race organizers, there are also typically unofficial stations along the route featuring beer, liquor, bacon, cotton candy, and other foods. It is common for lines to form at these stations due to their popularity among the casual race participants. On hot days, locals often provide lawn sprinklers, water guns, and garden hoses to cool down race participants.
