= Grace Nawowuna =

Kenyan track and field athlete

Grace Loibach Nawowuna
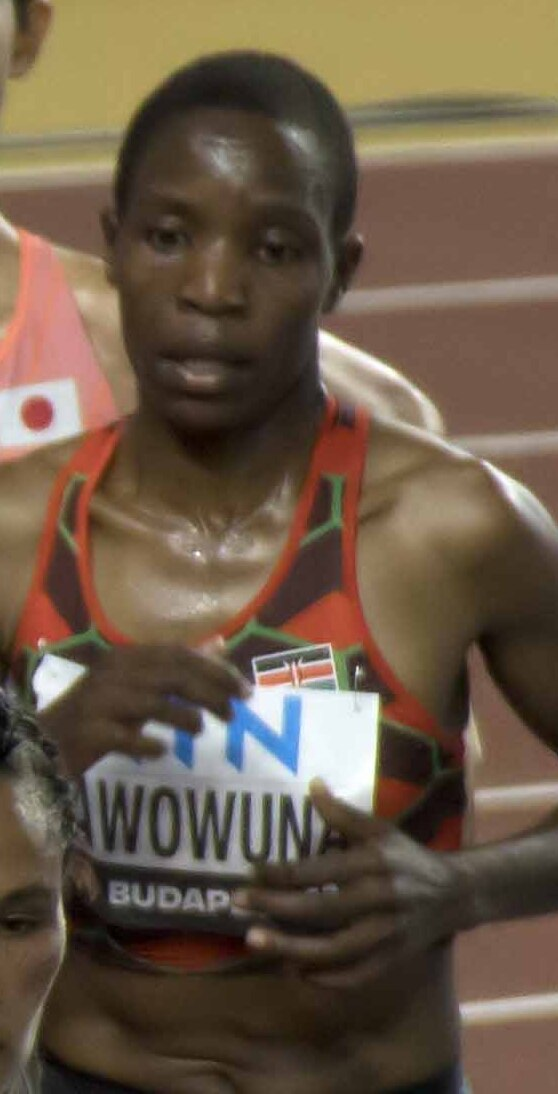
- Grace Nawowuna in 2023

Personal information
- Born: 10 November 2003 (age 23) Kenya

Sport
- Country: Kenya
- Sport: Track and field
- Event: Long-distance running

Achievements and titles
- Personal bests: 3000m: 9:19.56 (Nairobi 2021); 5000m: 14:42.63 (Paris 2023); 10,000 m: 29:47.42 (Hengelo 2023)
Medal record
Women's athletics
Representing Kenya
World Cross Country Championships
Gold medal – first place	2023 Bathurst	Senior team

Grace Loibach Nawowuna is a Kenyan track and field athlete who competes as a long-distance runner.

== Career ==
From Elgeyo Marakwet, Loibach won the women's senior 10 km race at the Kenyan Cross Country national trials on her senior race debut in December 2022.

She competed at the 2023 World Athletics Cross Country Championships in Bathurst in February 2023. She finished fourth in the women's race, clocking a 34:13 minute run. She won the gold medal as part of the successful Kenyan team ranking.

In June 2023 she ran the eighth fastest 10,000m time of all time in her debut at the distance, running 29:47.08 to finish runner-up to Sifan Hassan in Hengelo.

In April 2025, she was runner up to Gela Hambese at the Boston 5K in Massachusetts, finishing second in a spurt finish ahead of Taylor Roe.
