= Pasca Jerono =

Kenyan-American track and road runner

Personal information
- Born: Pasca Cheptanui Cheruiyot; July 27, 1986 (age 39)
- Education: Florida State

Sport
- Country: Kenya
- Sport: Athletics
- Event: Long-distance running

Pasca Jerono (née Cheptanui Cheruiyot; formerly Pasca Myers, born July 27, 1986) is a Kenyan-born American middle- and long-distance runner best known for winning the 2014 Grandma's Marathon in 2:33:45.

== Early career ==
Myers grew up in Marakwet District, Kenya. Like other freshmen in her high school, she was required to run during her first semester. Sally Kipyego was also at the school, and the two both competed through the regionals and into the province races (one step below nationals) in Kenya.

After college scouts spotted her, she traveled to attend college in the US. Finances kept her from attending an NCAA D-I school, so she began college at Rend Lake College in Ina, Illinois, in 2007. The small school, part of the NJCAA D-II Great Rivers Athletic Conference had been a starting point for other Kenyan distance runners such as Kipyego and Stephen Sambu.

Myers did well on the Lady Warriors track team. She placed second in the 10,000-meters and third in the 5,000- and 1,500-meter events in the 2007 NJCAA D-I Outdoor Track and Field championships. A few months later though, in fall 2008, she outpaced a packed group of strong runners to win the Rend Lake-hosted NJCAA Cross-Country Championships. Her time of 16:12.99 smashed the D-II record and set a new D-I record that (as of February 2022) still stands.

She continued dominating the junior college competition, placing in multiple races all the way to the NJCAA D-I Indoor Track and Field national championships where she took first in the 5,000- and 10,000-meters. She longed to run at a higher level, which eventually took her to Florida State University in Tallahassee, Florida.

As a Seminole, she led her team (along with Pilar McShine) to two second-place finishes at the 2009 and 2010 NCAA D-I Cross Country Championships.

== Professional career ==
In 2011, she beat Esther Erb and Serkalem Biset Abrha to win the storied Litchfield Hills Road Race. She ran her first half marathon at the News and Sentinel Half, beating out Ramilya Burangulova, but losing the lead pack (which included Moroccan Malika Mejdoub and Ethiopian Yihunlish Delelecha) and finishing ninth. Later in the year, she paced with Lyubov Denisova and Kim Pawelek Brantly but ran away to win the Marine Corps Half Marathon.

In 2013, she was a top finisher at the Fifth Third River Bank 25K and the Hy-Vee Road Races Half Marathon, where she edged Alevtina Ivanova and finished just behind IAAF World Championship competitor Hannah Wanjiru.

She ran to a fifth-place finish at Grandma's Marathon in 2013. She was a top finisher at the Crim 10-Mile behind Aliphine Tuliamuk. She was the fourth-place finisher at the California International Marathon. She was the runner-up at the Park-to-Park Half Marathon and the Des Moines Half Marathon.

In 2014, she won Grandma's Marathon, outrunning Brianne Nelson, Sarah Kiptoo, Yelena Nanaziashvili and 3,000 other women to finish with the victory, taking home more than $10,000.

Also in 2014, she was a top finisher behind Janet Cherobon-Bawcom in the Azalea Trail Run. She won the Kansas City Half Marathon in 1:16:15. A few months later, ran CIM but faded into 14th place.

In 2017, she finished top-10 at half marathons in Missouri, Iowa, Tennessee, Nebraska and South Dakota.

In 2018, she won the Lincoln Half Marathon in good weather conditions as Sammy Rotich, another Iowa resident, won for the fourth time.

In 2019, she repeated at the Lincoln Half, won the Dam to Dam 20K run in Des Moines, and she won the Kansas City Parkway Half Marathon.

In 2023, she was the runner-up at the Des Moines Marathon behind Leah Rotich.

== Personal life ==
Myers' older sister also got into running at an early age. Rose Cheruiyot would end up competing in the Olympics and setting the Kenyan record in the 5000-meters. Rose later became Pasca's coach.

She began dating Denny Myers, former coach of athletics at Iowa Central Community College in 2013, and the two married. But tragedy struck five years later. As Pasca prepared to compete in Grandma's Marathon, Denny died in their Duluth, Minnesota, hotel room.

Pasca continued to run and exercise, running 50 miles a week while coping with grief. She took more than a month away from competing. As a part of her routine, she engaged in her programs to become a nurse, motivated by the lack of care for preventable diseases that she saw in her early years.

Myers became a US citizen and a nurse. Several years after the tragedy, she remarried. She currently resides in Iowa with her son and runs with the Runablaze Iowa running club.
