= Sarah Kiptoo Cheriwoi =

Kenyan-born long-distance runner

Sarah Kiptoo Cheriwoi (born 1989) is a Kenyan-born long-distance runner who is the winner of the 2014 Casablanca International Marathon as well as the 2013 and 2016 Grandma's Marathon, the 2017 Philadelphia Marathon and several other American road races.

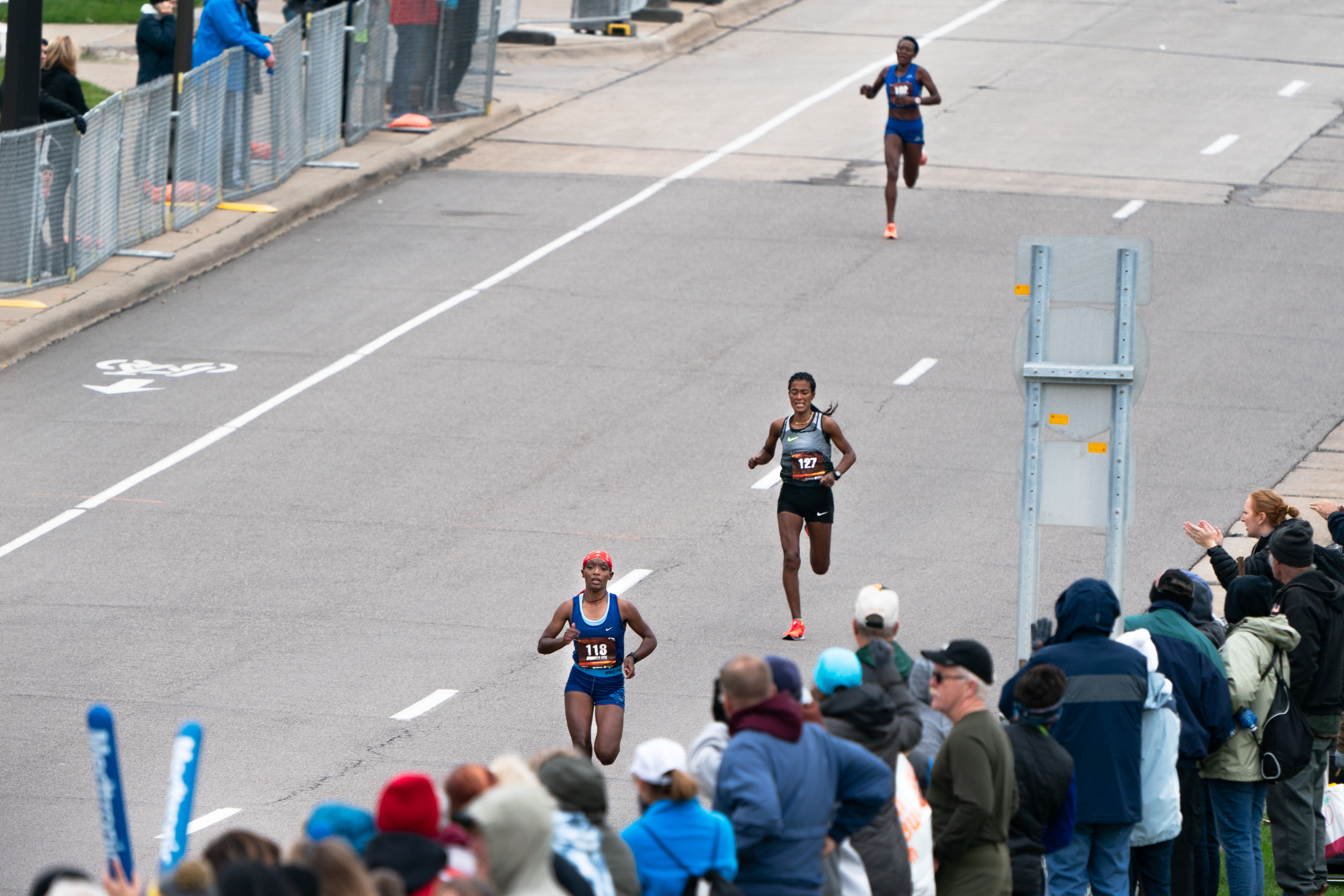
Top three finishers in the 2015 Minneapolis to St. Paul Twin Cities Marathon: Sinke Biyadgilgn, Serkalem Biset Abrha and Sarah Kiptoo

== Professional career ==
Before winning the Grandma's Marathon in June 2013 (and setting a new course record), Kiptoo ran and won several half marathons (as well as 5K and 10K road races) in the Netherlands, Finland, France, and England, while also finishing third at the Helsinki Marathon and top-10 in the Reims à Toutes Jambes, Madrid Half Marathon, Prague Half Marathon and Great Bristol Half Marathon. She took the 30,000-runner Indianapolis Half Marathon woman's win in 2013 as well, clocking a 1:12:26.

In May 2013, she was in Cleveland, Ohio, for the Cleveland Rite Aid Marathon. With a time of 2:33:42, Kiptoo won the race while lowering her personal record by more than 10 minutes. She won the race again in 2014.

Her first Grandma's Marathon in 2013 showed her aggressive running style and characteristic fast start. She had trained in Santa Fe, New Mexico, and arrived at the shores of Lake Superior ready to push the pace. She left Everlyne Lagat and clocked 1:11:31 at the half marathon mark, then kept the speed high to break Firiya Sultanova's course-record time from 2003. Kiptoo finished in 2:26:32 and won $20,000 along with a new Toyota Corolla.

She returned to the race in 2014, finishing third. In 2015, she was leading, but Jane Kibii passed her in the last mile. But when she arrived on a humid June day in 2016, things were different. She drank fluids copiously and kept looking over her shoulder to find Clara Santucci and Serkalem Biset Abrha. They wouldn't catch her—she broke the tape in first place with a 2:33:28 finish.

She also ran the California International Marathon in 2013 after the Houston Marathon canceled due to inclement weather. In the Sacramento race, she dueled with Paige Siemers, Jeannette Faber and Pasca Cheruiyot to finish second in 2:31:23, as Rebecca Wade finished first with a course record of 2:29:21. In 2016, she returned to the race in top form. She started in the lead pack and continued to pull ahead of some of the top runners in the nation by winning in 2:31:20, outpacing Stephanie Bruce and Lauren Jimison.

She raced the Big Sur Half Marathon and won back-to-back victories in 2013 and 2014, clocking her personal best half marathon time (1:11:21) in the first win.

In 2014, she was a top competitor at the USATF Half Marathon Championships.

In 2016, Kiptoo was making headlines in her hometown. She took first in the Santa Fe Thunder Half Marathon, winning in 1:15:52 (she had finished second in 2013 and 2014).

In 2017, Kiptoo arrived in Philadelphia with another New Mexican runner, Boniface Kongin. The two would lead men and women in the chilly, windy morning at the Philadelphia Marathon, with Kiptoo finishing in 2:38:13. She returned in 2018 to finish third as Serkalem Biset Abrha set a course record.

In October 2019, Kiptoo and hundreds of other runners had great conditions at the start of the Duke City Marathon in Albuquerque, New Mexico. Wearing her purple Grandma's Marathon T-shirt, she won the race and set her sights on returning to the Philadelphia Marathon.

Kiptoo was back in Kenya after the COVID-19 pandemic hit, but returned to Duluth for the 2021 Grandma's Marathon. She faded out though, and did not finish.

Kiptoo has finished 1st in over 25 races domestically and internationally, winning more than $150,000 in prize money.

== Personal life ==
Kiptoo has 10 siblings. She is the only elite runner in her family. She has two children (as of 2014). Kiptoo lives and trains in New Mexico with the AmeriKenyan Running Club. In the mid-2010s, she worked with agent Scott Robinson.

== Achievements ==
Year	Competition	Venue	Position	Event	Notes
2009	BIG 25 Berlin	Berlin, Germany	7th	25K	1:32:04
2010	Nottingham Half Marathon	Nottingham, England	1st	Half Marathon	1:16:54
2010	Val-de-Marne Half Marathon	Nogent-sur-Marne, France	1st	Half Marathon	1:13:56
2012	Lidingöloppet	Stockholm, Sweden	4th	10K Cross Country Run	36:05
2013	OneAmerica 500 Festival Mini-Marathon	Indianapolis, Indiana	1st	Half Marathon	1:12:26
2013	Cleveland Marathon	Cleveland, Ohio	1st	Marathon	2:33:42
2013	Grandma's Marathon	Duluth, Minnesota	1st	Marathon	2:26:32
2013	Big Sur Half Marathon	Big Sur, California	1st	Half Marathon	1:11:22
2013	California International Marathon	Sacramento, California	2nd	Marathon	2:31:23
2014	Cleveland Marathon	Cleveland, Ohio	1st	Marathon	2:34:58
2014	Grandma's Marathon	Duluth, Minnesota	3rd	Marathon	2:34:55
2014	Casablanca International Marathon	Casablanca, Morocco	1st	Marathon	2:35:22
2014	America's Finest City Half Marathon	San Diego, California	3rd	Half Marathon	1:15:38
2014	Big Sur Half Marathon	Big Sur, California	1st	Half Marathon	1:13:40
2015	OneAmerica 500 Festival Mini-Marathon	Indianapolis, Indiana	1st	Half Marathon	1:13:09
2015	Cobán International Half Marathon	Cobán, Guatemala	1st	Half Marathon	1:17:41
2015	Grandma's Marathon	Duluth, Minnesota	3rd	Marathon	2:32:51
2015	America's Finest City Half Marathon	San Diego, California	3rd	Half Marathon	1:15:38
2016	Grandma's Marathon	Duluth, Minnesota	1st	Marathon	2:33:29
2016	America's Finest City Half Marathon	San Diego, California	2nd	Half Marathon	1:15:52
2016	Twin Cities Marathon	St. Paul, Minnesota	2nd	Marathon	2:32:18
2016	California International Marathon	Sacramento, California	1st	Marathon	2:31:20
2017	Philadelphia Marathon	Philadelphia, Pennsylvania	1st	Marathon	2:38:14
