= Fred Torneden =

American long-distance runner

Personal information
- Nationality: (United States) American
- Born: July 2, 1957 (age 69) Dover, Kansas

Sport
- Sport: Running
- Event: Marathon
- College team: Butler Community College and Fort Hays State University
Medal record
Men's College athletics
NAIA Men's Indoor Track and Field Championship
Gold medal – first place	1979, Kansas City	3-mile
NAIA Men's Outdoor Track and Field Championship
Silver medal – second place	1979, Abilene	Marathon

Fred Torneden (born July 2, 1957) is an American mid- and long-distance runner who won several road racing victories in the 1980s and set the American record for the 20-mile distance in 1984. He competed for the United States at the first IAAF World Marathon Cup in 1985. He later became a coach and a pastor. He served as a children's pastor at Rock Hills Church in Manhattan, Kansas while continuing to run competitively at the masters level.

Until his retirement from full-time ministry in 2021, Torneden held credentials with the Assemblies of God and, with his wife Deb, still coach runners online.

== Collegiate career ==
Fred Torneden is a native of Dover, Kansas, and started his higher education at Butler Community College in El Dorado, where he ran as a walk-on for the track team. As a freshman, he won the Kansas Jayhawk Community College Conference championship in the 5,000 meter run.

He continued college at Fort Hays State University in Hays from 1977–1979, competing in the National Association of Intercollegiate Athletics. He became a four-time NAIA All-American while focusing on the middle and longer distances. As a senior, he won the NAIA 3-mile championship race, running 14:08.42.

The NAIA also held its first marathon race during the Outdoor Track and Field Championships in 1979. Torneden raced, placing second in 2:29:05 for his first marathon.

== Professional career ==
In December 1979, Torneden toed the line at the Dallas Marathon along with more than 2,500 other starters. While the temperature hovered near 40 degrees, Torneden led the pack, surging at mile 16 on a record-breaking pace. At the 25-mile mark, Kyle Heffner caught and passed him. They both broke the course record (Torneden's second-place time was 2:14:51).

The effort earned a bid to the US Olympic Trials Marathon. He trained by running up to 185 weekly miles while maintaining a full-time job. Politics were also having an effect on the athletes who were training. In March, the United States announced it would boycott the Moscow games. After winning a Wichita 15K in April, Torneden said that he agreed with the stance against the Soviet invasion of Afghanistan. Two weeks before the trials, he took a first-place finish in a Wichita 10K. He arrived in Buffalo, New York, for the trials without much of a taper. Torneden wasn't able to hold with the front pack and finished 95th, with a time of 2:25:17.

Later that year, he placed third in the Kansas City Marathon, finishing in 2:27:33.

He ran and won many Kansas road races in the 1980s. He won the Wichita River Run 10K from 1980-1982. He raced the Lake Atwood 10 Mile in 1981 in 50:23 (and again in 1983 in 49:58). In 1982, Torneden set the record for the fastest marathon ever run in Kansas, which still stands, at the Wichita Marathon. He won in a time of 2:18:08. Throughout the racing, Torneden was outspoken about his religious life, describing his Christian faith as his motivation, and even mentioning that he speaks in tongues while running.

In December 1982, he returned to Dallas for the marathon, which had grown to 3,500 starters. Torneden finished third in 2:15:20, coming in nine seconds behind Joe Sheeran. The winner, John Lodwick, set another course record with a 2:12:18.

Throughout 1983 and 1984, Torneden won several 8K, 10K, 10-mile and 15K races in Kansas and Oklahoma. For training, he was running 20 miles a day and even logged a 186-mile week.

In 1983, he ran the Lakefront Marathon in Milwaukee. He beat the pack to win $3,000, which went into a trust fund so he could remain an amateur. Although he qualified, he did not compete in the 1984 US Olympic Trials Marathon due to overtraining.

But in October 1984, Torneden raced the Twin Cities Marathon, which starts in Minneapolis and finishes in St. Paul, Minnesota. The race managers were facing some pressure from local church leadership, since the race took place on Sunday morning, blocking traffic for churches on the route. This year though, Torneden was the front runner, clipping through the miles while wearing Nike flats and a Nike jersey with this custom message: "Jesus is Lord." The message won over many who had first taken issue with the race being run on Sunday morning.

The race day was cool, with a temperature of 32 degrees F; frost was visible on the grass. Fans and reporters considered Henrik Jørgensen and Dick Beardsley to be the favorites. But Torneden went out with the leaders. At the 10-mile mark, the front pack was down to three runners: Jørgensen, Don Janicki and Torneden. At 19 miles, Jørgensen had faded and Torneden made his move, gaining a 100-meter lead over Janicki. Torneden went through 20 miles at a fast enough time to set an American 20-mile record. Torneden won the race in 2:11:35, setting a course record for the three-year old race and netting him a $20,000 purse prize. It was the fastest marathon time for an American runner in 1984—until December, when Ken Martin would run 11 seconds faster in the Sacramento Marathon. US Track and Field News ranked Torneden in the top 10 marathon runners for 1984 along with Pete Pfitzinger, Alberto Salazar, Bill Rodgers (runner), and others. After the race, Torneden was the 45th fastest American marathoner ever.

His success at Twin Cities earned him a slot on the first-ever IAAF World Marathon Cup team for the United States along with Pfitzinger. While training, he raced a personal best 10-mile time at the Statehood Days race in Lincoln, Nebraska.

In 2002, Fort Hays State University inducted Torneden to their Athletic Hall of Fame.

He has been named "Runner of the Year" five times by the Kansas Road Running Association (1982–1984, 2018 and 2023). Fred won the 2023 USATF Masters 1 mile Championships in his age group. His 5:19 time was one second off the M65 American Record. At the 2024 USATF Masters Indoor Track and Field Championships, both he and his wife Deb ran on world record age group 4x800m relays on the same day. As of 2023, 41 years after winning the Wichita Marathon, his winning time is still the fastest-ever marathon in Kansas.

== Coaching ==
Torneden returned to Butler Community College as a coach for the Grizzlies' cross country and track teams. Under his seven years of coaching, the Grizzlies won several Kansas Conference championships and continued on to win National Junior College Athletic Association DI national championships, including the NJCAA DI National Men's Cross Country Championship title on November 11, 1995 in Alfred, New York.

In 1998, Fred and his wife Deb, who coached with him, were named NJCAA DI cross country "Coaches of the Year."

Torneden also coached at the University of Texas and Coffeyville Community College. He currently does personal coaching for athletes in Kansas.

== Personal life ==
Fred Torneden taught as a fitness instructor at Butler for 27 years (1992-2019). He also served as bi-vocational pastor from 2000-2010. He has published two books about the Christian faith: "The Christian Expression" (2009) and "The Real Gospel" (2010). Fred is married to Deborah Torneden (née Pihl), also a competitive runner and a coach. She raced for the United States on four different world road race championships including the 1995 World Marathon Cup.

== Achievements ==
Year	Competition	Venue	Position	Event	Notes
1979	NAIA Indoor Track and Field National Championship	Kansas City, Missouri	1st	3-mile	14:08.42
1979	NAIA Outdoor Track and Field National Championship	Abilene, Texas	2nd	Marathon	2:29:05
1979	Dallas Marathon	Dallas, Texas	2nd	Marathon	2:15:20
1980	US Olympic Trials Marathon	Buffalo, New York	95th	Marathon	2:25:17
1980	Kansas City Marathon	Kansas City, Missouri	3rd	Marathon	2:27:33
1981	Nike OTC Marathon	Eugene, Oregon	9th	Marathon	2:14:52
1981	Tulsa Run	Tulsa, Oklahoma	19th	15K	49:21
1982	Wichita Marathon	Wichita, Kansas	1st	Marathon	2:18:08
1982	Dallas Marathon	Dallas, Texas	3rd	Marathon	2:15:20
1983	Boston Marathon	Boston, Massachusetts	44	Marathon	2:17:09
1983	Milwaukee Marathon	Milwaukee, Wisconsin	1st	Marathon	2:14:43
1983	Paradise Island Half Marathon	Nassau, Bahamas	1st	Half Marathon	1:09:14
1984	Houston Marathon	Houston, Texas	6th	Marathon	2:12:52
1984	Hospital Hill Half Marathon	Kansas City, Missouri	1st	Half Marathon	1:05:14
1984	Defeet Diabetes	Hutchinson, Kansas	1st	10K	29:47
1984	Twin Cities Marathon	Minneapolis, United States	1st	Marathon	2:11:35
1985	Statehood Days Run	Lincoln, Nebraska	3rd	10-mile	49:21.64
1985	World Marathon Cup	Hiroshima, Japan	DNF	Marathon	—

citations
