= San Diego Half Marathon =

The San Diego Half Marathon may refer to:

- Rock 'n' Roll San Diego Half Marathon
- America's Finest City Half Marathon
