= Green Bay Marathon =

- Green Bay Marathon Marathon logo
- Date: May
- Location: Green Bay, Wisconsin, United States
- Event type: Road
- Distance: Marathon
- Established: June 2000
- Last held: May 2024
- Course records: Men: 2:15:15 (2010) James Boit Women: 2:37:39 (2010) Janet Cherobon
- Website: Official Site

The Green Bay Marathon was an annual race event that took place on the third week of May in Green Bay, Wisconsin in the United States.

== History ==
The Green Bay Marathon was started in June 2000 by its first race director, Gloria West. The final race director was Toni Jaeckels. The races included a full marathon, a half marathon, a 5 km race, and a children's race. Its official name is the "Cellcom Green Bay Marathon", as its major sponsor is Cellcom.

The full marathon course record for men is 2:15:15 set by James Boit in 2010. The full marathon course record for women is 2:37:39, set in 2010 by Janet Cherobon who broke her own record from the year before.

The men's half marathon course record is 1:04:16 set by Josphat Chobei in 2017. The women's half marathon course record is 1:12:27 set by Kelly Johnson in 2013.

The men's marathon in 2008 was won by Ukraine's Andriy Toptun in a time of 2:22:51.

In 2011, the course was mis-measured resulting in a marathon that was 800 feet (240 m) too long.

The race that was held on Sunday, May 20, 2012, was halted, due to excessive heat. This was the first year in the history of the race that this was done. Due to unexpected and quickly escalating heat and humidity, the decision was made to call the race at approximately 9:35 a.m. after the 7:00 a.m. start. In the marathon, only ten runners were scored.

The 2020 race weekend was canceled due to the COVID-19 pandemic. The race organizers gave an option to those who had already registered: run a virtual race or defer their entry to the 2021 race weekend. But the 2021 event was also canceled.

The 25th running of the Green Bay Marathon, held on May 19, 2024, was the final running of the race.

== Course ==
The course was relatively flat and fast. One of the biggest features is the opportunity for runners and walkers to race the last tenth of a mile through historic Lambeau Field, home of an American football team known as the Green Bay Packers.

All of the weekend road race events started next to Lambeau Field on Lombardi Avenue. The Cellcom 5K, held on Saturday, travels north through the tree-lined streets of west Green Bay. On Sunday, the Cellcom Green Bay Half Marathon course follows nearly the same course as the 5K event, yet expands the distance to 13.1 miles and includes streets in Ashwaubenon. Also on Sunday and considered the main event, the Cellcom Green Bay Marathon course has its own unique route which travels from the stadium district, through Ashwaubenon and into De Pere. From De Pere, the participants run along 6 miles of the Fox River Trail, through Allouez, and into downtown Green Bay. At this time, the runners get a rare opportunity to run through City Stadium, which is the original game location of the historic Green Bay Packers NFL franchise. All three road courses, as well as the Wisconsin Public Service Kids' Power Run, make a victory lap inside Lambeau Field just before the finish line.
