= Laban Moiben =

Kenyan marathon runner

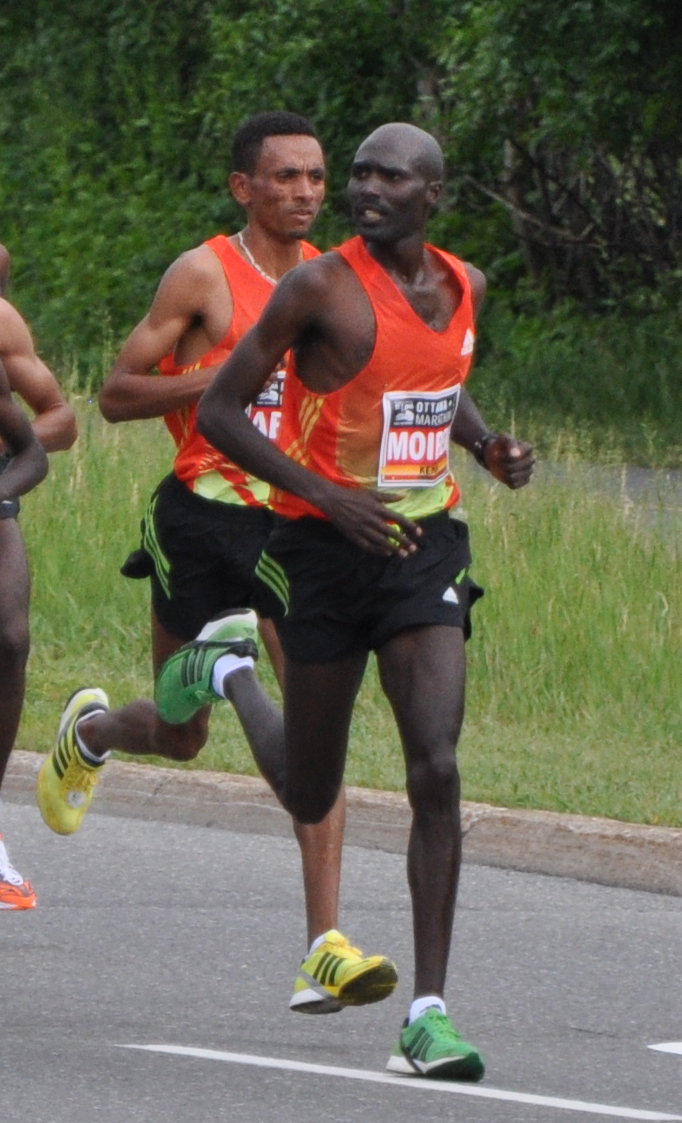
Laban Moiben during the 2012 Ottawa Marathon

Laban Kipkemoi Moiben (born 13 October 1983) is a Kenyan long-distance runner who competes professionally in marathon races. He has a personal best of 2:09:12.9 hours for the distance and has won marathon races in Montreal, Los Angeles, Sacramento, Ottawa and Mumbai.

== Career summary ==
Raised in Eldama Ravine in Kenya's Rift Valley Province, he began running while studying at Timboroa High School (an institution also attended by Kenyan international medallist Daniel Kipchirchir Komen). Moiben made his first forays in marathon running while based in North America. He made his marathon debut in 2006, coming fourth at Grandma's Marathon in Duluth, then setting a personal best time of 2:16:45 hours for fifth place at the Toronto Waterfront Marathon later that year. That same year he was third at the Shamrock Half Marathon, fourth at the Fifth Third River Bank Run In 2007 he had back-to-back wins over the distance, taking the titles at the Montreal Marathon and the California International Marathon in Sacramento (setting a best of 2:14:31 hours at the latter race). He also won the Georgia Half Marathon in March and placed second at the Country Music Marathon in Nashville, Tennessee in April.

He began 2008 with his third straight marathon win at the Los Angeles Marathon, improving his best time further to 2:13:50 hours. Although he was eighth at the Rock 'n' Roll San Diego Marathon in June, he ran a personal record time of 2:13:31 hours. He returned to defend his title at the Montreal Marathon, but was beaten into second place by Lamech Mosoti Mokono. In his last outing of the year at the Honolulu Marathon he failed to complete the distance for the first time, dropping out mid-race. He finished both of his two races in 2009, finishing fourth at the Ottawa Marathon and taking the runner-up spot at the San Antonio Marathon. He also set a 10K best of 29:30 minutes en route to victory at the Vulcan Run.

Moiben scored a significant personal best at the Ottawa Marathon the following year, dipping under two hours and ten minutes with his time of 2:09:43 hours, taking second place behind Arata Fujiwara. Another strong performance came at the 2010 Chicago Marathon, where he came seventh in the men's race with a time of 2:10:48 hours. He continued to perform well in 2011, taking third at the Los Angeles Marathon then beating Dereje Abera in a sprint finish to win the Ottawa Marathon in a season's best time of 2:10:18 hours.

His 2012 running season began in a similar fashion to how 2011 had ended: it came down to a sprint finish against an Ethiopian, Raji Assefa on this occasion, and Moiben came out on top. This time it was at the Mumbai Marathon, his first marathon run and victory outside of North America. In May he set a new course record and personal best of 2:09:12.9 at the Ottawa Marathon.

On February 11, 2018, Laban Moiben set a new personal record for the 10K run, winning the Buriram Marathon 10 km road race in Buriram, Thailand with a time of 28:59.5.
