= Philadelphia Marathon =

Annual marathon sporting event held in Philadelphia

Coordinates: 39.96477°N 75.17952°W

- Location: Philadelphia, Pennsylvania
- Distance: Marathon
- Primary sponsor: AACR
- Established: 1954
- Course records: Men: 2:13:28 (2021) (Kenya) Mike Chesire; Women: 2:28:34 (2021) (Canada) Leslie Sexton
- Website: Philadelphia Marathon
- Participants: 12,381 (2024); 11,438 (2023)

The Philadelphia Marathon (aka the Philadelphia Independence Marathon) is an annual marathon sporting event held in Philadelphia, Pennsylvania on the third Sunday of November. The Philadelphia Marathon ranks among the top ten in the nation's largest marathons with over 10,000 finishers. The marathon course is professionally certified at 42.195 kilometres (26.219 mi) by the Road Running Technical Council of USA Track & Field.

== History ==
The roots of the Philadelphia Marathon (aka the Philadelphia Independence Marathon and today known as the AACR Philadelphia Marathon) can be traced back to 1954, the race's unofficial inaugural year. The marathon then largely was a suburban event and went by many different names; the Greater Philadelphia Independence Marathon (1981–82) and the Fairmount Park Marathon (1988–89). The marathon today, was established under the name of the Philadelphia Marathon in 1994 under then Mayor Ed Rendell as an annual running event that took place entirely within the City of Philadelphia. The first race in 1994 had a little over 1,500 runners.

This yearly event takes place on the 3rd Sunday in November or “the Sunday before Thanksgiving”. The Marathon is a top U.S. running event and top Boston qualifier with 30,000 runners participating in one or more of 7 featured events. Those events include, the AACR Philadelphia Marathon, Dietz & Watson Philadelphia Half Marathon, Rothman Orthopaedic 8K and four challenges where runners compete in completing multiple race combinations over two days. The Philadelphia Marathon Weekend has over 60,000 spectators and 3,000 volunteers who provide valuable race day support. Working along with volunteers from local schools, colleges and universities and the community actively participate to organize cheer zones, manage replenishment stations, monitor the course and provide support to help runners have their best possible runner experience while in the “City of Brotherly Love and Sisterly Affection”.

As a major City event, the Marathon is produced by the City of Philadelphia, Managing Director's Office. In 1995, a group of dedicated runners and Dr. Peter Sharkey of the Rothman Institute, a top Philadelphia orthopedic practice, sponsored a smaller running event as part of the Sunday Marathon event. Now, 23 years and 3,000 runners later, the Rothman 8K is an integral part of Marathon Weekend. In 2006, a half marathon was added to the Sunday line up by Janis Pierce, the City Representative at that time, and a runner, and in 2016 the race moved to a two-day event with the half marathon and 8K on Saturday and full marathon on Sunday.

In 2011, two competitors died, which were the first deaths to occur in the Philadelphia Marathon in over a decade. The first was Jeffrey Lee, a 21-year-old Nursing and Wharton student attending the University of Pennsylvania. Having collapsed after crossing the finish line of an apparent heart attack, the cause of his death remains unknown. Although the cause of death was officially diagnosed as hypertrophic cardiomyopathy, after further examination of the autopsy, it was concluded that the diagnosis may not have been accurate since the size of his heart would have been normal for an athlete. Therefore, medical professionals believe his death may have been caused by an underlying heart condition, not a heart attack. The second death was of Chris Gleason, a 40-year-old experienced triathlete from Clifton Park, NY. Gleason collapsed a quarter-mile from the finish line from heart attack.

In 2020, the Marathon was cancelled after mayor Jim Kenney announced a moratorium on public gatherings of more than 50 people within the city of Philadelphia on July 14 due to the COVID-19 pandemic. Registrants were given the option of either transferring their entry to 2021, 2022, or 2023, or obtaining a refund.

In 2021, the marathon was held under a restrictions that only vaccinated runners may participate in all events and the Dunkin Kids Fun Run was cancelled. The race had over 21,000 runners between in-person events and virtually.

In 2023, a combined 34,000 runners participated in the race weekend, including the full marathon, half marathon, 8K, and children's race. This broke the record for the total number of participants. This was also the first time in a decade that the marathon had completely sold out.

In 2024, the marathon race had 12,381 finishers. This set a new record for the race, passing the previous peak of 11,641 set back in 2012.

In 2025, the marathon sold out for the third year in a row. The race reached capacity much earlier than it had in the previous two years, with an announcement made on July 4.

== Course ==
The course begins and ends at the Philadelphia Museum of Art on the Benjamin Franklin Parkway. The Philadelphia Marathon course is relatively flat and offers a view of many historical landmarks that include Independence Hall, the Betsy Ross House and the Liberty Bell. The course travels the streets of Old City on Penn's Landing, parallel to the Delaware River, along the Schuylkill River and out to Manayunk. The highest elevation in the course is approximately 148 feet.

== Runner information ==
The event also serves as a qualifying race for entry into the Boston Marathon for participants whose times meet age group bracketed standards. The race also features a state of the art timing system, using a small chip that attached to the back of each runner's bib that provides a 'chip time' for when the person has crossed the start and finish lines, as well as giving a traditional 'gun time'.

Health and Fitness Expo - Runners pick up their race packets that include a race bib, timing tag, T-shirt and bag at the free two-day health and fitness expo located in the Pennsylvania Convention Center.

Cheer Zones – Spectators can select from more than 20 cheer zones throughout the course to show support to the runners.

Transportation - Detours throughout parts of the city begin at 3AM and run until 1PM

== Awards ==
Several cash prizes are awarded for the full marathon.

- 1st - $10,000 one male & one female (Course Record Bonus: $1,500, one male & one female for each)
- 2nd - $5,000 one male & one female
- 3rd - $2,500 one male & one female
- 1st - Masters - $1,000 one male & one female
- 1st - Philadelphian - $1,000 one male & one female (must be a resident of Philadelphia County, determined by ZIP code)
- 1st - Wheelchair - $1,000

All marathon runners receive a Philadelphia Marathon T-shirt, a Finisher Medal and a finisher certificate (available online after the race).

== Other races ==
=== Dietz & Watson Philadelphia Half Marathon ===
The Half Marathon was added to Race Weekend in 2006 and winds through Philadelphia's most scenic and historic neighborhoods. From the history-steeped streets of Old City, through one of the liveliest stretches of Center City, across the Schuylkill, up through the bucolic trails of Fairmount Park, and back down to canvas the banks of the river. The course is also sanctioned by USA Track & Field. Dietz and Watson is the current sponsor for the half-marathon portion of the Philadelphia Marathon weekend. Each runner receives a t-shirt, a finisher medal and a finisher certificate (available online after the race).

=== Rothman 8K ===
The Rothman Orthopaedic sponsors an 8-km (about 5 miles) companion race to the Philadelphia Marathon. This race follows a shorter loop of the marathon, starting off on the expansive Benjamin Franklin Parkway before taking a turn on the scenic banks of the Schuylkill River and Martin Luther King Drive or Kelly Drive. Each runner receives a T-shirt, a finisher medal and a finisher certificate (available online after the race).

== Environmental impact ==
The AACR Philadelphia Marathon collaborated with the Mayor's Office of Civic Engagement to turn the race into an eco-friendly sporting event.

In 2007, the Marathon's eco-friendly events began with recycling paper, cardboard, plastics, food and medals. Each year the “going green” efforts continued. Pallets were recycled, the Marathon partnered with the More Foundation by recycling sneakers to support families in Ghana, partnered with the Streets Department and began composting cups and organics and introduced the “Waste Watchers Volunteers” to facilitate on-site sorting. In 2012–2013, the Philadelphia Marathon received a Gold Certification from the Council of responsible Sport (ReSport) and organization that certifies special events for environmental sustainability and community engagement. In 2014-15 the Marathon received Green Certification along with achieving Zero Waste (over 90% diversion waste from landfill).

Some of the sustainable initiatives include:

- Recycling heat sheets
- Collecting and donating outer layers of warm up clothes
- Recycling runners bags
- Composting cups
- Melting down and recycling excess runners medals

== Winners ==
Year	Men's time	Men's winner	Country	Women's time	Women's winner	Country	Non-binary time	Non-binary winner	Country
22 Nov, 2026	2:09:23	Victor Shitsama	Kenya	2:26:34	Dayna Pidhoreski	Canada	Will Newman	2:40:36	
23 Nov, 2025	2:13:58	Melikhaya Frans	South Africa	2:34:56	Anna Oeser	United States	Bryce Ott	3:20:15	
24 Nov, 2024	2:16:12	William Loevner	United States	2:32:42	Katie Florio	United States	Reed Williams	2:46:33	United States
19 Nov, 2023	2:14:26	Benard Kiptoo Koech	Kenya	2:30:53	Mercy Jerop Kwambai	Kenya	Kassian Eaton	2:35:38	United States
20 Nov, 2022	2:14:20	Dominic Ondoro	Kenya	2:31:35	Amber Zimmerman	United States			
21 Nov, 2021	2:13:28	Michael Chesire	Kenya	2:28:34	Leslie Sexton	Canada			
Not held 2020 due to COVID-19
24 Nov, 2019	2:16:31	Deriba Degefa	Ethiopia	2:32:49	Feyne Gemeda	Ethiopia			
18 Nov, 2018	2:14:47	Tadesse Dabi	Ethiopia	2:32:53	Serkalem Biset Abrha	Ethiopia			
19 Nov, 2017	2:16:25	Boniface Kongin	Kenya	2:38:14	Sarah Kiptoo	United States			
20 Nov, 2016	2:15:53	Jonathan Cheruiyot	Kenya	2:36:25	Taylor Ward	United States			
22 Nov, 2015	2:17:44	Teklu Deneke	Ethiopia	2:40:05	Gisela Olalde	Mexico			
23 Nov, 2014	2:17:28	Dan Vassallo	United States	2:40:00	Leonora Petrina	United States			
17 Nov, 2013	2:17:28	Abebe Mekuriya	Ethiopia	2:39:06	Irina Alexandrova	Russia			
18 Nov, 2012	2:17:49	Michael McKeeman	United States	2:35:37	Irina Mashkantseva	Russia			
20 Nov, 2011	2:19:16	Folisho Tuko	United States	2:35:46	Mariska Kramer	Netherlands			
22 Nov, 2010	2:21:28	Daniel Vassallo (MA)	United States	2:38:55	Mariska Kramer	Netherlands			
22 Nov, 2009	2:17:15	John Crews (NC)	United States	2:46:44	Jutta Merilainen	Finland			
23 Nov, 2008	2:19:57	Andriy Toptun	Ukraine	2:44:02	Vera Ovcharuk	Ukraine			
18 Nov, 2007	2:25:01	Timothy Psitet	Kenya	2:42:05	Kristin Price (NC)	United States			
19 Nov, 2006	2:17:09	Hosea Kimutai	Kenya	2:40:31	Maryina Bychkova	Russia			
20 Nov, 2005	2:21:02	Joseph Ndiritu-2	Kenya	2:43:07	Emily Kroshus	Canada			
21 Nov, 2004	2:19:43	Michael Korir-2	Kenya	2:41:57	Larisa Mikhailova	Russia			
23 Nov, 2003	2:16:47	Joseph Ndiritu	Kenya	2:45:05	Seana Carmean (MA)	United States			
24 Nov, 2002	2:18:43	Michael Korir	Kenya	2:39:47	Tatyana Maslova	Russia			
18 Nov, 2001	2:21:07	Gennadiy Temnikov	Russia	2:41:05	Elena Plastinina	Ukraine			
19 Nov, 2000	2:18:03	Brian Clas (NY)	United States	2:41:56	Elvira Kolpakova	Russia			
21 Nov, 1999	2:25:46	Tesfaye Bekele	Ethiopia	2:37:59	Anne Marie Lauck (NJ)	United States			
22 Nov, 1998	2:24:12	Ryan Grote (NJ)	United States	2:44:59	Jan Wanklyn-2	United States			
23 Nov, 1997	2:19:03	Gavin Gaynor (PA)	United States	2:41:35	Sarah Hunter	Canada			
24 Nov, 1996	2:19:55	Nikolic Srba	Yugoslavia	2:50:01	Bea Marie Altieri (MD)	United States			
19 Nov, 1995	2:20:15	Mark Andrews (NC)	United States	2:39:54	Jeanne Peterson (NY)	United States			
20 Nov, 1994	2:21:22	Charles Crabb (PA)	United States	2:52:08	Jan Wanklyn (PA)	United States			
Not held 1990-93
1989	2:22	Tim Wunch	United States						
1988	2:32:23	Fred Schneck (PA)	United States						
29 Nov, 1987	2:24:08	Tim Wunsch	United States	2:54:12	Lori Lawson	United States			
23 Nov, 1986	2:25:25	Ira Meyers (PA)	United States	2:47:15	Doreen Mastalli (NY)	United States			
24 Nov, 1985	2:18:27a	Derick Adamson-2	Jamaica	2:38:30a	Sandra Mewett	Bermuda			
25 Nov, 1984	2:16:39a	Derick Adamson	Jamaica	2:42:30a	Barbara Filtuze (PA)	United States			
27 Nov, 1983	2:15:26a	Sam Pelletier (ME)	United States	2:36:38a	Jane Welzel	United States			
28 Nov, 1982	2:14:59a	William Scholl (NJ)	United States	2:34:28a	Jan Yerkes-2	United States			
29 Nov, 1981	2:17:25a	Dave Patterson (PA)	United States	2:39:11a	Jan Yerkes (PA)	United States			
30 Nov, 1980	2:26:18	William Devoe	United States	3:04:36	Pam Borowsky	United States			
25 Nov, 1979	2:30:06	Richard Hayden	United States	3:05:21	Chris Schilling	United States			
26 Nov, 1978	2:22:38	Richard diSebastian-2	United States	2:56:05	Carol Geig	United States			
1977	2:25:59	Richard diSebastian	United States	none					
1976	2:24:59.6	Dave Patterson	United States						
29 Nov, 1975	2:26:12	Carlo Cherubino & Larry Frederick	United States	3:04:44	Nancy Kent	Cornell			
01 Dec, 1974	2:21:57	Bill Rodgers (MA)	United States	3:25:33	Mary Devlin	United States			
25 Nov, 1973	2:29:44.4	Bill Bragg	United States						
26 Nov, 1972	2:27:29.5	Rick Bayko	United States						
28 Nov, 1971	2:26:44.8	Moses Mayfield-2	United States						
29 Nov, 1970	2:24:29	Moses Mayfield	United States	none					
30 Nov, 1969	2:32:52.4	Leo Duart	United States	none					
1968	2:36:35.6	Jim McDonagh	United States						
03 Dec, 1967	2:24:23	Bill Clark (CA)	United States	none					
18 Dec, 1966	2:24:43.4	Amby Burfoot (CT)	United States	3:58:49	Sue Morse	United States			
26 Dec, 1965	2:34:07.6	Tom Osler (NJ)	United States	none					
24 Jan, 1965	2:37:23	John Kelly (NY)	United States	none					
19 Jan, 1964	2:20:05	Adolf Gruber-2	Austria	none					
27 Jan, 1963	2:39:49	Adolf Gruber	Austria	none					
28 Jan, 1962	2:33:13.6	Ted Corbitt -4	United States	none					
Not held 1960-1961
25 Jan, 1959	2:29:43	Ted Corbitt-3	United States	none					
05 Jan, 1958	2:26:44	Ted Corbitt-2	United States	none					
27 Jan, 1957	2:31:19	Jack Barry-2	United States	none					
29 Jan, 1956	2:36:09	Jack Barry (PA)	United States	none					
30 Jan, 1955	2:25:23	Johnny J Kelley	United States	none					
31 Jan, 1954	2:36:06	Ted Corbitt (NY)	United States	none					

Winners by Country

Number	Country	Last Time
64	United States	2024
10	Kenya	2026
7	Russia	2013
6	Ethiopia	2019
4	Canada	2026
3	Ukraine	2008
4	Canada	2026
2	Netherlands	2011
2	Jamaica	1985
2	Austria	1964
1	Mexico	2015
1	Finland	2009
1	Yugoslavia	1996
1	Bermuda	1985

Winners by Continent

Number	Continent	Last Time
72	North America	2026
16	Africa	2026
9	Europe	2011
7	Asia	2013

== Sponsors ==
In 2013, Gore-Tex was announced to be the title sponsor for the next three years.

In 2017, American Association for Cancer Research (AACR) was announced to be the title sponsor for the next three years for the full marathon.

In 2017, Dietz & Watson was announced to be the official sponsor for the half marathon.

In 2017, the Rothman Institute agreed to continue its sponsorship of the 8K event. The Rothman Institute has been part of the Philadelphia Marathon for over 19 years, dating back to when Drs. Richard Rothman and Peter Sharkey began sponsoring the 8K as part of their community outreach efforts.

In 2017, Dunkin' Donuts was announced to be the official sponsor for the Dunkin' Munchkins Run.

In 2018, Garmin joined the team of sponsors for the Marathon, and was named the official timer and running watch for that year's marathon.

== See also ==
- Broad Street Run
- Philadelphia Distance Run
- Sports in Philadelphia
