= Yoshiro Mifune =

Japanese long-distance runner

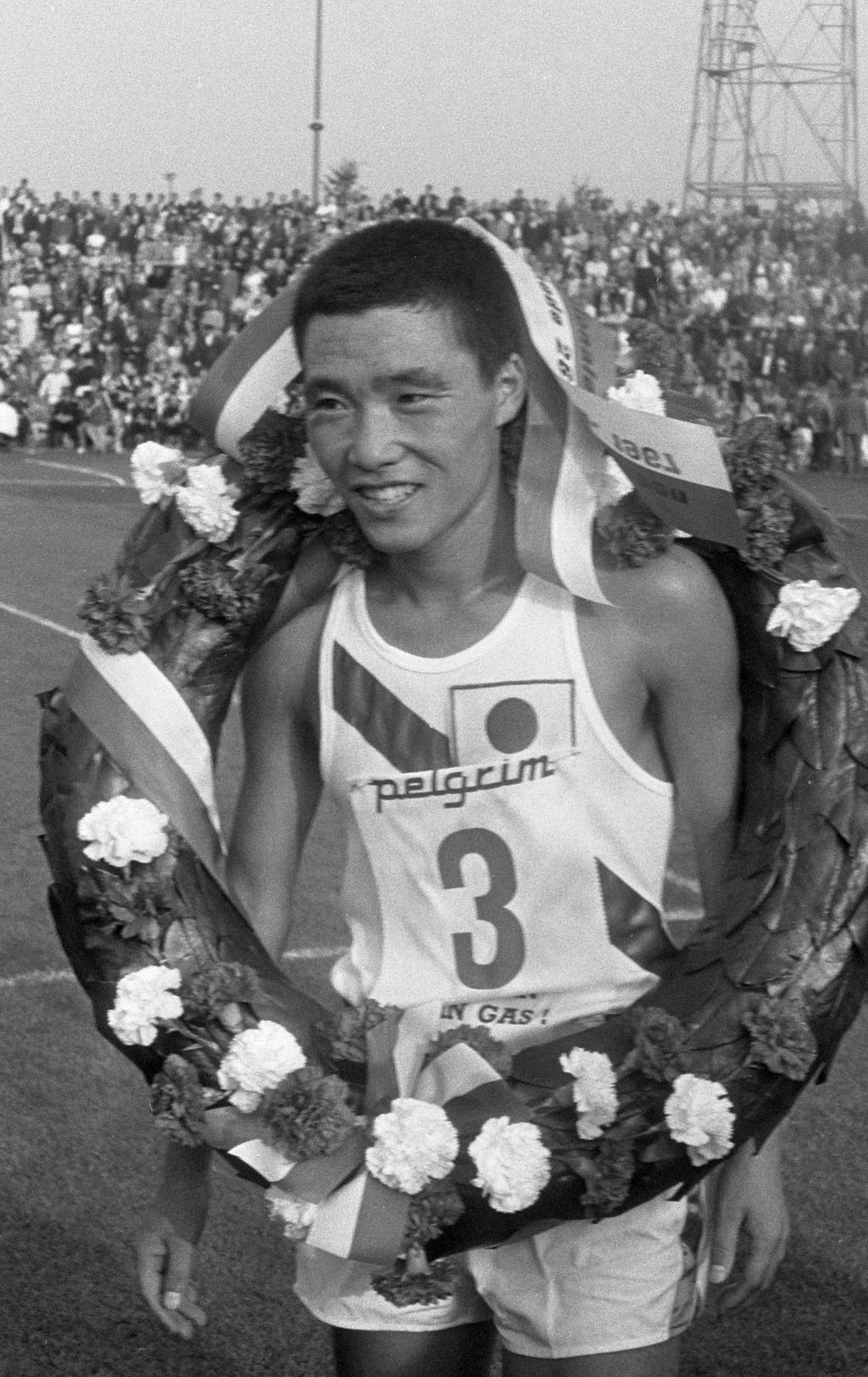
- Yoshiro Mifune at the Enschede Marathon in 1967

Sport
- Sport: Long-distance running
- Club: RICCAR
Medal record
Representing Japan
Asian Games
Silver medal – second place	1970 Bangkok	Marathon

Yoshiro Mifune (御船芳郎, Mifune Yoshirō) (born 19 November 1945) is a retired Japanese long-distance runner who won a silver medal in the marathon at the 1970 Asian Games. He also won the Lake Biwa Marathon (1966 and 1967), Enschede Marathon (1967), Sapporo Half Marathon (1970) and Beppu-Ōita Marathon (1972).
