= Sinke Biyadgilgn =

Ethiopian long-distance runner

Sinke Dessie Biyadgilgn (born 1995) is a professional runner who was born in Ethiopia, and now resides in Washington, D.C.

In 2018, she surprised many runners when she took the lead in the Twin Cities Marathon, holding the lead to win in 2:33:04, just six seconds in front of two others. Biyadgilgn won $7,500 as a result. This was her first time running the race where she beat Serkalem Biset Abrha of Ethiopia.

In 2016, she set a course record at a 5-mile race organized by the DC Road Runners with more than 4,000 runners. She won the race in 26:51.
