= Enschede Marathon =

Annual marathon race in Enschede, Netherlands

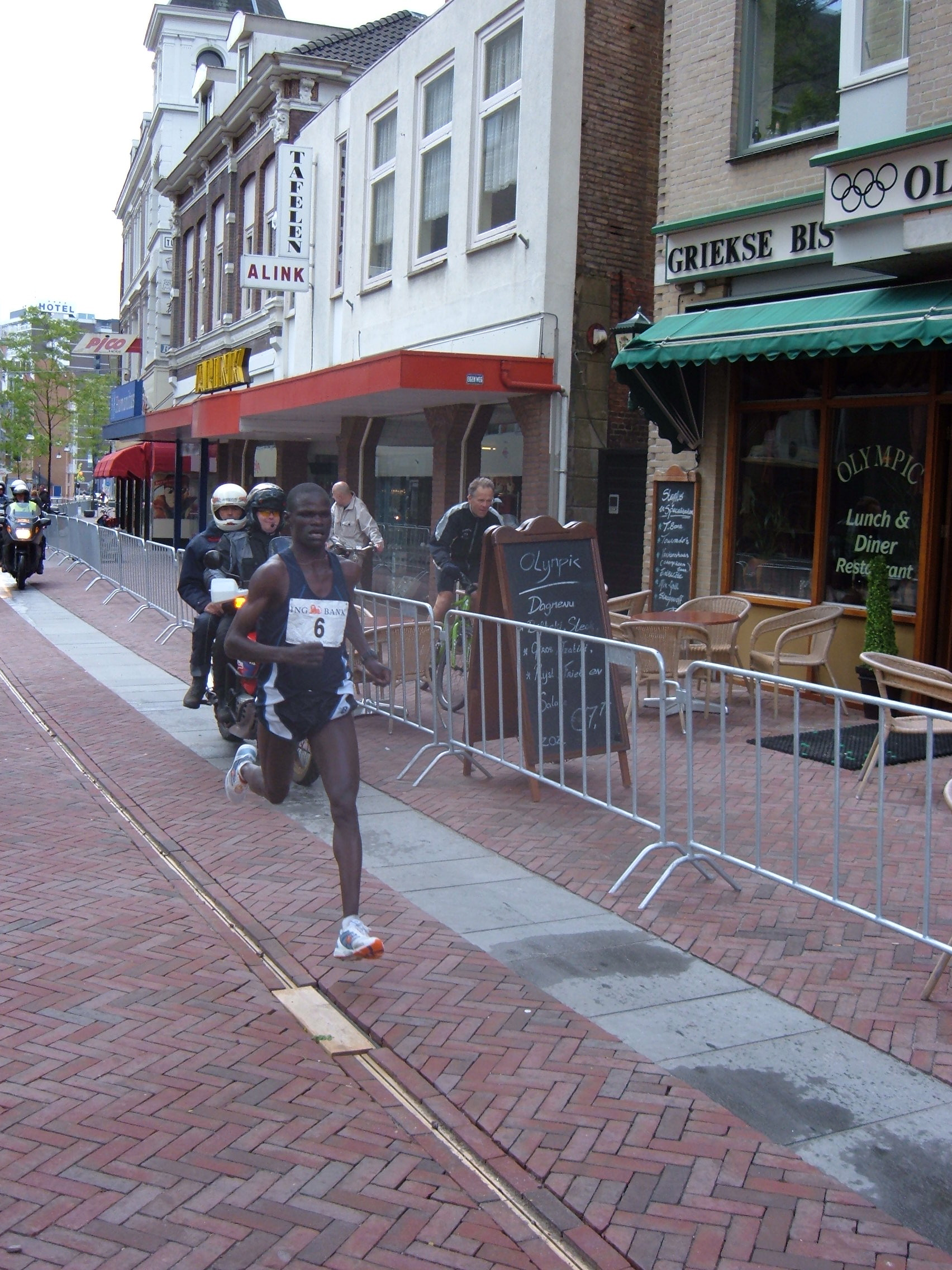
- John Kelai winning the marathon of 2005
- Date: Mid-April
- Location: Enschede, Netherlands
- Event type: Road
- Distance: Marathon, Half marathon, 10K run, 5K run
- Established: 1991
- Course records: Men's: 2:04:30 (2021) (Kenya) Eliud Kipchoge; Women's: 2:21:10 (2022) (Kenya) Maurine Chepkemoi
- Website: Enschede Marathon
- Participants: 274 finishers (2022); 45 finishers (2021); 133 finishers (2019)

The Enschede Marathon is an annual marathon race held in the city of Enschede, Netherlands. The race is the distance of a typical marathon (42 km, 195 metres). It has been held annually since 1991, after being bi-annual for the previous 44 years. Until 2009 the race crossed the German border through the city of Gronau. There has been a women's competition since 1981.

Kenyan Eliud Kipchoge is the current course record holder with his winning time of 2:04:30 hours from 2021. Kenyan Maurine Chepkemoi holds the women's best mark for the course with her time of 2:21:10 hours from 2022.

== Past winners ==
Key: Course record

=== Men ===
Date	Men's winner	Country	Time (h:m:s)
April 21, 2024	Taoufik Allam	Morocco	2:08:58
April 16, 2023	Alfred Barkach	Kenya	2:08:51
April 24, 2022	Julius Tuwei	Kenya	2:07:43
April 18, 2021	Eliud Kipchoge	Kenya	2:04:30
April 19, 2020	Postponed to 2021 due to COVID-19		
April 14, 2019	Geart Jorritsma	Netherlands	2:26:34
April 22, 2018	Mohamed Oumaarir	Morocco	2:28:23
April 23, 2017	Jonas Roels	Belgium	2:31:10
April 17, 2016	David Stevens	Belgium	2:31:34
April 19, 2015	Evans Cheruiyot	Kenya	2:09:40
April 27, 2014	Elijah Sang	Kenya	2:10:21
April 21, 2013	Isaac Kosgei	Kenya	2:09:17
April 22, 2012	Ishmael Busendich	Kenya	2:09:09
April 17, 2011	Stephen Kiprotich	Uganda	2:07:20
April 25, 2010	John Kelai	Kenya	2:12:17
April 26, 2009	Jacob Yator	Kenya	2:09:02
April 27, 2008	Silas Toek	Kenya	2:10:40
April 22, 2007	Thomson Cherogony	Kenya	2:11:35
April 23, 2006	Sammy Rotich	Kenya	2:12:05
May 15, 2005	John Kelai	Kenya	2:11:44
May 16, 2004	Girma Tolla	Ethiopia	2:10:33
May 25, 2003	Wilson Kibet	Kenya	2:11:38
May 26, 2002	Raymond Kipkoech	Kenya	2:12:33
May 27, 2001	Mustapha Riad	Morocco	2:12:20
2000	Cancelled	—	—
June 6, 1999	Anatoli Zerouk	Ukraine	2:16:31
June 7, 1998	Hussein Ahmed Salah	Djibouti	2:13:25
June 8, 1997	Dmitry Kapitonov	Russia	2:12:09
June 16, 1996	John Mandu	Kenya	2:15:14
June 18, 1995	Viktor Goural	Ukraine	2:15:29
June 5, 1994	Piotr Pobłocki	Poland	2:13:01
June 13, 1993	Jan Tau	South Africa	2:12:19
October 11, 1992	Willie Mtolo	South Africa	2:13:39
October 13, 1991	Sergey Prorokov	Soviet Union	2:15:04
August 26, 1989	Marti ten Kate	Netherlands	2:10:57
June 20, 1987	Marti ten Kate	Netherlands	2:13:52
October 12, 1985	Zoltan Köszegi	Hungary	2:15:39
September 10, 1983	Kevin Forster	United Kingdom	2:14:19
July 11, 1981	Cor Vriend	Netherlands	2:15:54
August 25, 1979	Kirk Pfeffer	United States	2:11:50
August 27, 1977	Brian Maxwell	Canada	2:15:14
August 30, 1975	Ron Hill	United Kingdom	2:15:59
September 1, 1973	Ron Hill	United Kingdom	2:18:06
September 4, 1971	Bernie Allen	United Kingdom	2:16:54
August 16, 1969	Kazuo Matsubara	Japan	2:19:29
August 26, 1967	Yoshiro Mifune	Japan	2:20:53
August 28, 1965	Aurèle Vandendriessche	Belgium	2:21:16
July 13, 1963	Václav Chudomel	(Czech Republic) Czechoslovakia	2:25:11
August 12, 1961	Peter Wilkinson	United Kingdom	2:24:12
August 15, 1959	Pavel Kantorek	(Czech Republic) Czechoslovakia	2:26:48
August 17, 1957	Piet Bleeker	Netherlands	2:32:39
August 27, 1955	Reinaldo Gorno	Argentina	2:26:33
September 12, 1953	Jim Peters	United Kingdom	2:19:22
September 1, 1951	Veikko Karvonen	Finland	2:29:02
August 20, 1949	Jack Holden	United Kingdom	2:20:52
August 20, 1947	Eero Riikonen	Finland	2:44:13

=== Women ===
Date	Women's winner	Country	Time (h:m:s)
April 21, 2024	Souad Kanbouchia	Morocco	2:27:16
April 16, 2023	Shyline Toroitich	Kenya	2:22:45
April 24, 2022	Maurine Chepkemoi	Kenya	2:21:10
April 18, 2021	Katharina Steinruck	Germany	2:25:59
April 19, 2020	Postponed to 2021 due to COVID-19		
April 14, 2019	Caroline Chepkwony	Kenya	2:27:00
April 22, 2018	Kellen Waithira	Kenya	2:34:06
April 23, 2017	Betty Lempus	Kenya	2:29:31
April 17, 2016	Sarah Jebet	Kenya	2:27:59
April 19, 2015	Mireille Baart	Netherlands	2:51:48
April 27, 2014	Reina Visser	Netherlands	2:42:06
April 21, 2013	Arenda Abbink	Netherlands	2:59:52
April 22, 2012	Konstantina Kefala	Greece	2:41:01
April 17, 2011	Ingrid Prigge	Netherlands	2:45:10
April 25, 2010	Ingrid Prigge	Netherlands	2:46:25
April 26, 2009	Ilona Pfeiffer	Germany	2:44:58
April 27, 2008	Polly Nkambi	Netherlands	3:12:41
April 22, 2007	Ingrid Prigge	Netherlands	2:42:31
April 23, 2006	Petra van Tongeren	Netherlands	3:19:13
May 15, 2005	Abidi Tigist	Ethiopia	2:33:01
May 16, 2004	Nadezhda Wijenberg	Netherlands	2:31:23
May 25, 2003	Gea Siekmans	Netherlands	3:05:02
May 26, 2002	Lidya Vasilevskaya	Russia	2:29:23
May 27, 2001	Franca Fiacconi	Italy	2:31:40
2000	Cancelled	—	—
June 6, 1999	Halina Karnatsevich	Belarus	2:37:35
June 7, 1998	Wioletta Kryza	Poland	2:38:51
June 8, 1997	Carla Beurskens	Netherlands	2:37:20
June 16, 1996	Mieke Pullen	Netherlands	2:41:13
June 18, 1995	Irina Yagodina	Ukraine	2:36:43
June 5, 1994	Franca Fiacconi	Italy	2:37:43
June 13, 1993	Veronika Troxler	Switzerland	2:44:33
October 11, 1992	Natalia Repescko	South Africa	2:42:50
October 13, 1991	Czesława Mentlewicz	Poland	2:41:48
August 26, 1989	Alena Peterková	(Czech Republic) Czechoslovakia	2:40:28
June 20, 1987	Helen Comsa	Switzerland	2:39:29
October 12, 1985	Eefje van Wissen	Netherlands	2:39:32
September 10, 1983	Priscilla Welch	United Kingdom	2:36:32
July 11, 1981	Jane Wipf	United States	2:38:21
