= Derick Adamson =

Jamaican marathon runner

Personal information
- Nickname: Ringo
- Born: 24 March 1958 (age 68) Saint Mary, Colony of Jamaica, British Empire

Sport
- Country: Jamaica
- Sport: Long-distance running
- Events: Marathon, 10,000 metres

Achievements and titles
- Olympic finals: 1984, 1988
- Commonwealth finals: 1990

Derick "Ringo" Adamson" (Note: Derrick Adamson in some sources.) (born 24 March 1958) is a Jamaican former marathon runner. He competed at the 1984 and 1988 Olympic Games, the 1990 Commonwealth Games, and also won the 1984 and 1985 Philadelphia Marathons.

== Sporting career ==
Adamson studied at Glassboro State College (now Rowan University), graduating in 1983 with a bachelor's degree in physical education. During his time there, he was a four-time all-conference runner, competing in the steeplechase and other long-distance running events. In 1980, during his sophomore year, he won the NCAA Division III steeplechase championship, and finished fourth in the Jamaican trials for the 1980 Olympics. Whilst a student, Adamson set the Jamaican steeplechase national record, and competed at the 1982 Central American and Caribbean Games.

Adamson qualified for the marathon at the 1984 Olympic Games, where he finished 52nd in a time of 2:25:02. (Note: Other sources suggest he finished 31st or 51st in the event.) Later in the year, he was scheduled to compete at the 1984 New York City Marathon, but withdrew before the start as the weather was too warm. In the same year, he won the 1984 Philadelphia Marathon in a time of 2:16.39, a Jamaican national record in the event. In 1985, Adamson won the event for a second consecutive year in a time of 2:18:27, 5 minutes and 13 seconds ahead of anyone else. After the race, Adamson said that he had hoped to have run a faster time, but was slowed down by the wind. Adamson competed in the marathon at the 1988 Olympic Games, finishing 84th, and also ran the 10,000 metres at the 1990 Commonwealth Games, where he finished ninth.

== Coaching career ==
Whilst a student, Adamson worked as a coach at Gloucester County College. From 1983 to 1988, he was the men's head cross-country coach at Gloucester County College, and was also the women's head cross-country coach from 1991 to 1994. He won the regional Coach of the Year award in 1985, and won the New Jersey Athletic Conference Women's Cross Country Coach of the Year in 2008, 2009, 2011, and 2012. In July 2014, Adamson became the first full-time Rowan coach for women's cross-country.
