= Wioletta Kryza =

Polish long-distance runner

Wioletta Kryza also known as Violetta Kryza (born 10 August 1968) is a Polish long-distance runner who is a national champion in the marathon.

== Biography ==
Between 20 September 1992 and 2 December 2007, Kryza won 26. Kryza's first marathon victory was at the 1992 Montreal International Marathon where she is a three-time champion of the event. Her last victory was at the 2007 California International Marathon. Kryza also won the Zwei Länder Marathon five consecutive times between 1996 and 2000.

She won the 2002 Pittsburgh Marathon, but was disqualified and suspended for two-years for failing a drug test. In 2012, she failed another test and was suspended for 8 years.

Kryza holds Poland's all-comers record in the women's marathon.

== Achievements ==
Year	Competition	Venue	Position	Event	Notes
Representing Poland
1992	Montreal International Marathon	Montréal, Canada	1st	Marathon	2:42:56
1998	Enschede Marathon	Enschede, Netherlands	1st	Marathon	2:38:51
2001	Pittsburgh Marathon	Pittsburgh, United States	1st	Marathon	2:34:16
2006	Montreal International Marathon	Montréal, Canada	1st	Marathon	2:43:05.1
2007	California International Marathon	Sacramento, United States	1st	Marathon	2:39:20
2007	Montreal International Marathon	Montréal, Canada	1st	Marathon	2:43:25.7
