= Kirk Pfeffer =

American long-distance runner

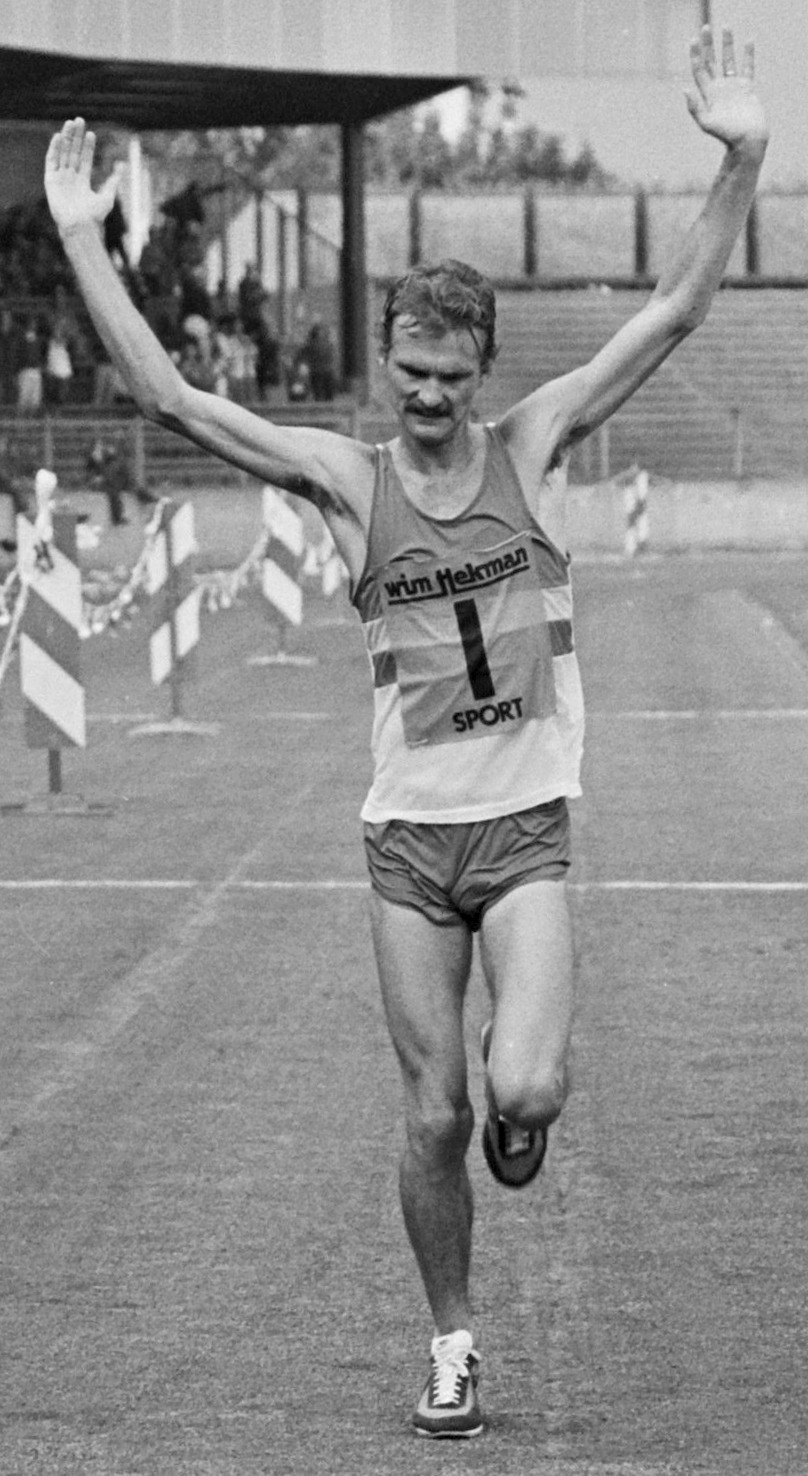
- Pfeffer winning the Enschede Marathon in 1979

Personal information
- Born: July 30, 1956 (age 69)

Sport
- Sport: Long-distance running

Kirk Pfeffer (born July 30, 1956, in California) is a retired American long-distance runner, who competed in marathons. He won the Enschede Marathon in 1979 in 2:11:50 and America's Finest City Half Marathon in 1981 in 1:02:55. On December 7, 1979, he set a new world record in the half marathon at 1:02:32 in Las Vegas. Next year he ran his best marathon time of 2:10:29 in Fukuoka, which placed him tenth in the World Marathon Rankings for 1980.

Five years before that, he set a world junior record of 2:17:44 in the old Mission Bay Marathon in San Diego.[4]

In the 1979 New York City Marathon, Pfeffer led the field until 23 1/2 miles when he was passed by Bill Rodgers in Central Park. Rodgers won in 2:11:42, and Pfeffer held on for second place, finishing about 500 yards behind with a time of 2:13:08. In the 1983 New York City Marathon he finished 13th in 2:12:20, his last world-class performance at a major marathon.
