= Paige Wood =

American distance runner (born 1996)

Personal information
- Born: 31 January 1996 (age 30) Pottsville, Pennsylvania, U.S.

Sport
- Country: United States
- Events: Marathon, half marathon
- College team: Syracuse University

Achievements and titles
- Personal bests: Marathon: 2:26:02; Half marathon: 1:09:20

Paige Wood (née Stoner) is an American distance runner. She was an NCAA All-American runner at Syracuse University before becoming the USA Champion in the marathon in 2022. Wood also qualified for the U.S. Olympic Trials in 2020 and 2024.

== Early life ==
Wood grew up in Pottsville, Pennsylvania and attended Pottsville Area High School, where she won multiple regional championships in cross country and track. Wood began her college career at Lipscomb University, where she placed second in the Atlantic Sun cross country championship as a freshman. She then transferred to Syracuse University, where she became a five-time NCAA All-American for the Orange. Wood also broke school records in the 5,000 meters (15:28) and 10,000 meters (32:07).

== Career ==
After graduating in 2019, Wood competed for Reebok Boston Track Club. She ran her first marathon in December 2020 in Arizona. Her time of 2:28:43 is the fastest ever for an American woman under 25 years old.

In 2021, she competed in the 10,000 meters in the U.S. Olympic Trials (track and field), placing 34th of 41 entrants. In the fall, she finished 17th at the Boston Marathon.

In 2022, Wood finished third in the Cherry Blossom Ten Mile Run and sixth at the USA 6K Championship. Over the summer of 2022, Wood relocated to Flagstaff, Arizona. She joined Northern Arizona Elite and began training with Emily Durgin and Josette Norris.

At the 2022 USA Marathon Championship hosted by the California International Marathon, Wood ran 2:26:02 to win the national title. She also broke the previous course record.

Due to the birth of her son in November 2023, Wood did not compete at the 2024 United States Olympic Trials (marathon) in Orlando. She returned to road racing at the 2024 Boilermaker Road Race where she placed 13th. Later in the year she placed seventh at the Twin Cities 10-Mile and 12th at the Cross Champs in Texas.

In 2025, Wood finished third at Grandma's Marathon in a time of 2:30:24. In the fall, she took 10th at the Twin Cities 10-Mile and second at the Philadelphia Half Marathon.

Wood finished 17th at the 2026 Boston Marathon. She was the ninth American finisher. On 1 November 2026, Wood ran 2:27:29 at the New York City Marathon to place ninth overall and fourth among Americans.
