= Melikhaya Frans =

South African long-distance runner

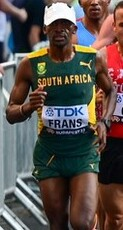
- Frans at the 2023 World Athletics Championships

Personal information
- Born: 2 January 1990 (age 36)

Sport
- Country: South Africa
- Sport: Long-distance running

Melikhaya Frans (born 2 January 1990) is a South African long-distance runner.

In 2018, he competed in the men's half marathon at the 2018 IAAF World Half Marathon Championships held in Valencia, Spain. He finished in 60th place. His top performance in the marathon distance came in 2022 when he ran 2:09:24 at the world championships held in Eugene, Oregon in the United States. In 2025, Frans won both the Philadelphia and Riga Marathons, the latter race held in the capital city of Latvia.

== International competitions ==
Year	Competition	Venue	Position	Event	Notes
2017	Cape Town Marathon	Cape Town Marathon, RSA	10th	Marathon	2:15:41
2020	London Marathon	London, United Kingdom	21st	Marathon	2:13:50
2021	Cape Town Marathon	Cape Town, RSA	6th	Marathon	2:11:28
2022	World Championships	Eugene, United States	18th	Marathon	2:09:24
2024	Cape Town Marathon	Cape Town, RSA	5th	Marathon	2:12:18
2025	Philadelphia Marathon	Philadelphia, USA	1st	Marathon	2:13:58
2025	Riga Marathon	Riga, Latvia	1st	Marathon	2:13:20
