= Eero Riikonen =

Finnish long-distance runner

Eero Riikonen (30 December 1910, Uusikirkko, date of death unknown) was a Finnish athlete who mainly competed in the 10,000m and the marathon. He won the bronze medal in the 10,000m at the Finnish Championships in Athletics in 1936 and 1938. He then won the inaugural Enschede Marathon in 1947.

== Personal Bests ==
Distance	Time (min)	Date	Location
10,000 m	31:26.6	August 8, 1938	Helsinki
Marathon	2:41:09.0	September 30, 1951	Turku
