= Marathon Beneva de Montréal =

Annual race in Canada held since 1979

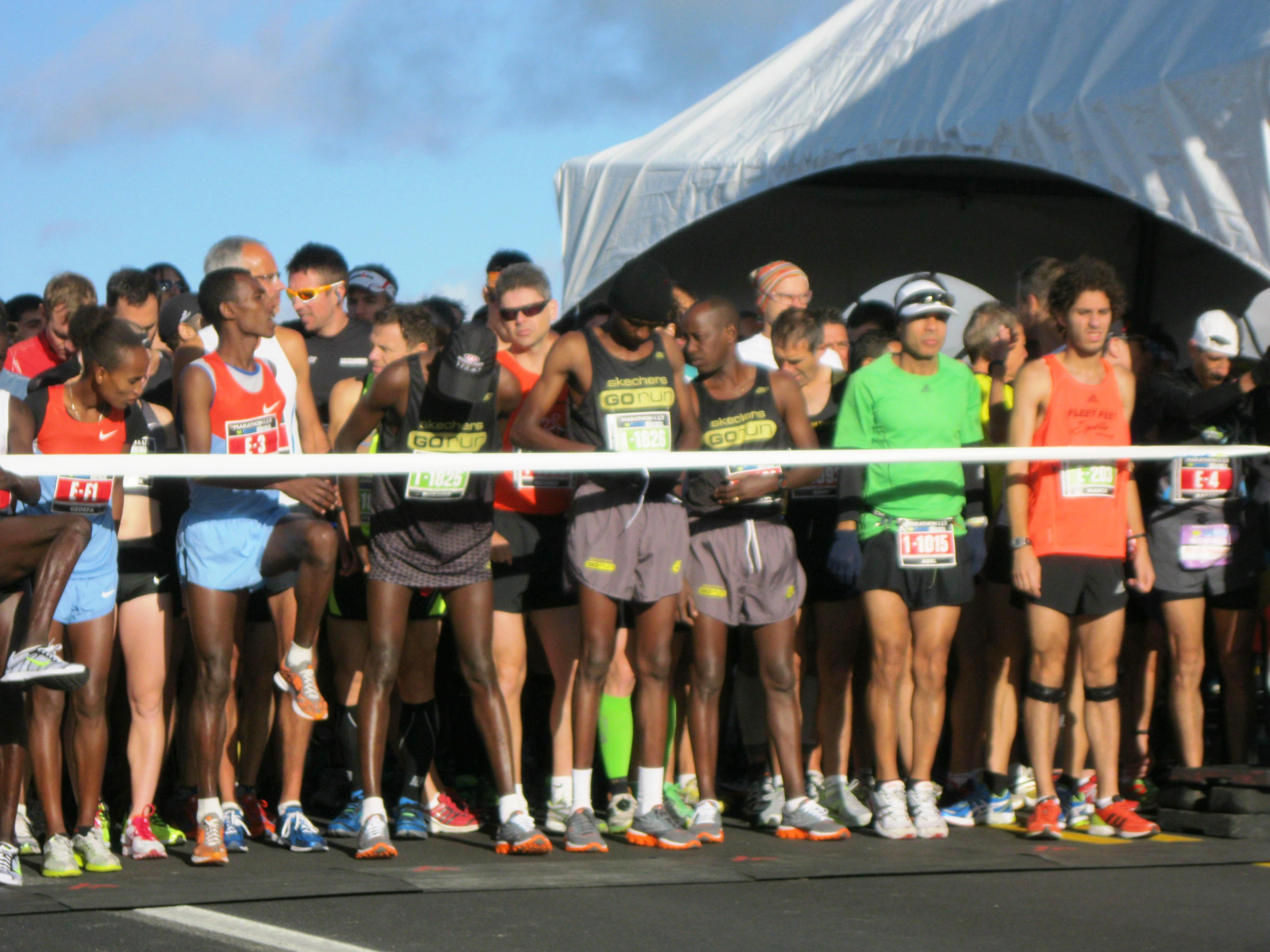
- Runners waiting to begin at the 2012 Marathon
- Date: September
- Location: Montreal, Quebec, Canada
- Event type: Road
- Distance: Marathon
- Established: 1979 (47 years ago)
- Website: Marathon Beneva de Montréal

The Marathon Beneva de Montréal (formerly Marathon Oasis de Montreal and Rock 'n' Roll Montreal Marathon) is an annual marathon foot-race held in Montreal, Quebec, Canada in September, first held in 1979. The Marathon de Montréal is the largest running event in Quebec.

== History ==
Approximately 9,000 runners took part in the first edition of August 25, 1979. After disappearing from 1997 to 2002, the Montreal Marathon in 2004 returned in a broader framework involving other activities such as walking, running, wheelchair or bicycle. In 2008, runners came from 25 countries and had more than 17,600 participants from all disciplines.

In 2010, the 20th edition of the marathon was held on Sunday September 5 with a record participation of 21,000 runners from 30 countries. The event has continued to grow and the 2013 edition (held on September 22) broke a new record with 32,000 runners.

From 2012 to 2020, the race was controlled by Chinese conglomerate Wanda Group through its Rock 'n' Roll Marathon Series of marathons and half-marathons held in North America and Europe.

The 2017 edition of the race was reduced due to heat and humidity, as the marathon distance only was cancelled. The half marathon and 10km races started an hour earlier.

On September 22, 2019, a runner (Patrick Neely) unfortunately died after collapsing near the end of the half-marathon finish line.

The 2020 edition of the race was cancelled due to the coronavirus pandemic. New owner Advance Publications announced they would also be unable to hold the event in 2021, leading to the city of Montreal transferring organisational duties of the marathon to a local group, the Grand Prix Cyclistes de Québec et de Montréal. This non-profit organization manages the Grand Prix Cycliste de Québec and Grand Prix Cycliste de Montréal bicycle road races.

== Course ==
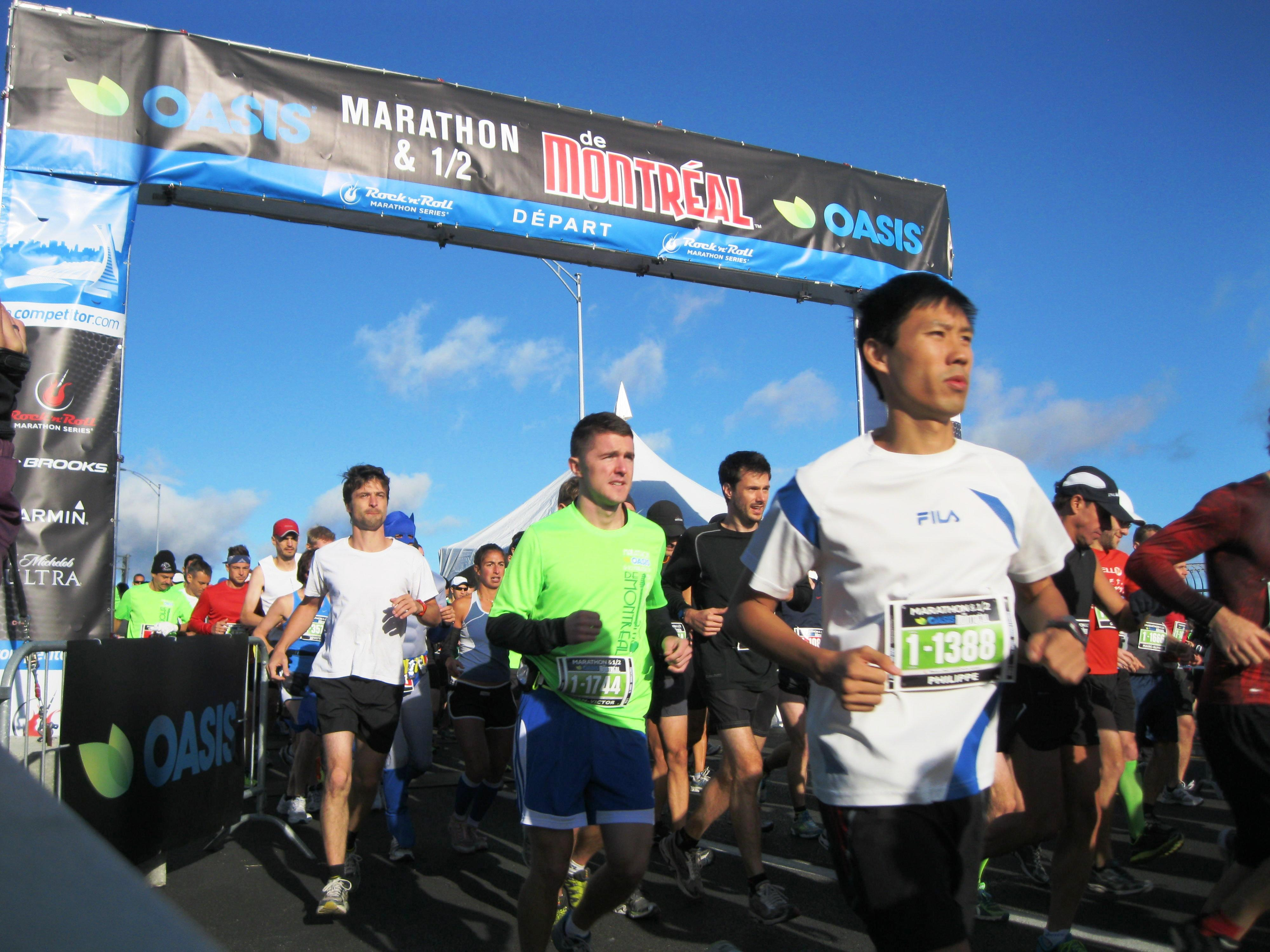
Departure from the Jacques-Cartier Bridge in 2012

According to tradition, the departure is from the Jacques-Cartier Bridge. The route of 42.195 km crosses different districts in Montreal through the Notre Dame Island and Saint Helen's Island on Circuit Gilles Villeneuve, the Old Montreal, the district Ville-Marie, Rosemont-La Petite-Patrie and Hochelaga-Maisonneuve. Formerly, races finished in the Olympic Stadium, home of the 1976 Summer Olympics until the 2011 edition of the marathon when the finish line was moved to Parc Maisonneuve due to the growing number of participants. In 2012 and 2013, the finish line was in La Fontaine Park.

== Other races ==
During the event, various distances are available:

- Marathon
- Half marathon
- 10 km race
- 5 km race
- Blakes Corporate Challenge (Relay)
- The School Challenge 5 km
- Le P'tit marathon (1 km) for kids 3 to 11 years old.

== Community impact ==
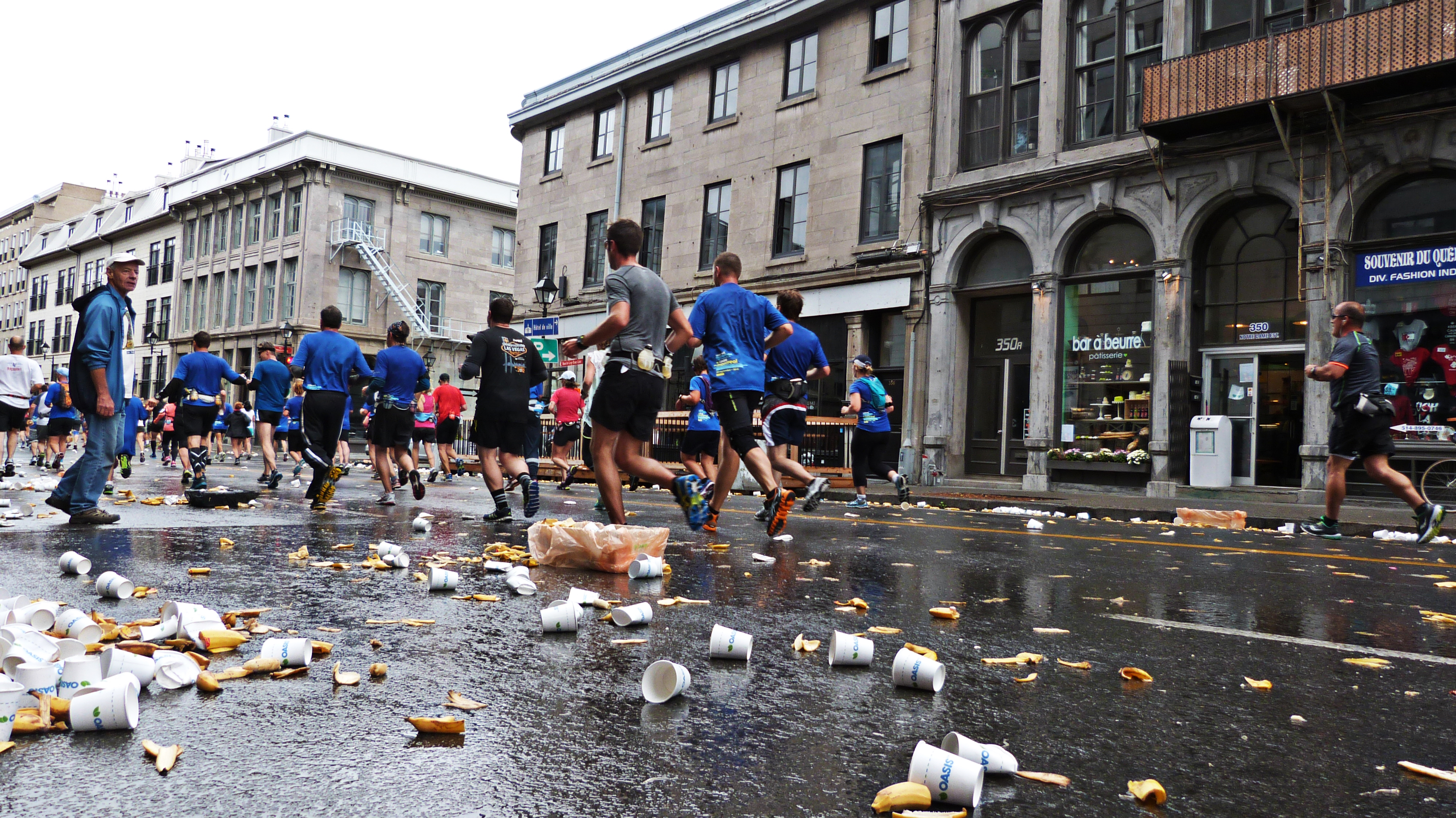
Discarded banana peels on the ground after the 2013 Marathon

Students on the run (Étudiants dans la course) is a program where the objective is to encourage selected students from high risk neighbourhoods of Montreal to lead healthy lives, perform better in school, and improve social integration by helping them participate in the Montreal Marathon. It is a project inspired by Students Run LA, a program that has achieved concrete results in the last 20 years. For the 2010 race, there were 19 students to begin with and 12 persevered. During 11 months, students trained to complete the full 42.2 km marathon and on September 12, 2010 they crossed the finish line. The program continues with a new group each year since its conception.

== Winners ==
Key: Course record

Ed.	Year	Men's winner	Time	Women's winner	Time	Rf.
	2003	Anthony Gitau (KEN)	2:30:31	Tina Kader (CAN)	2:58:55	
14	2004	Noureddine Betim (ALG)	2:22:33	Nicole Stevenson (CAN)	2:47:12	
15	2005	David Mandago Kipkorir (KEN)	2:17:26	Isabelle Ledroit (CAN)	2:56:20	
16	2006	Danny Kassap (COD)	2:20:20	Wioletta Kryza (POL)	2:43:06	
17	2007	Laban Moiben (KEN)	2:15:29	Wioletta Kryza (POL)	2:43:26	
18	2008	Lamech Mosoti Mokono (KEN)	2:17:07	Yeshi Esayias (ETH)	2:42:17	
19	2009	Francis Kipketer Chesumei (KEN)	2:16:11	Irene Cherop Loritareng (KEN)	2:39:32	
20	2010	Julius Kirwa Choge (KEN)	2:17:41	Serkalem Biset Abrha (ETH)	2:35:46	
21	2011	Luka Kipkemboi Chelimo (KEN)	2:13:45	Serkalem Biset Abrha (ETH)	2:33:21	
22	2012	Joseph Chirlee (USA)	2:18:42	Doreen Kitaka (KEN)	2:47:41	
23	2013	David Savard-Gagnon (CAN)	2:30:15	Nadia Bolduc (CAN)	2:51:33	
24	2014	Ben Bruce (USA)	2:22:38	Joanne Normand (CAN)	3:01:27	
25	2015	Nicholas Berrouard (CAN)	2:26:42	Geneviève Asselin-Demers (CAN)	2:58:59	
26	2016	Kari Steinn Karlsson (ISL)	2:24:18	Arianne Raby (CAN)	2:48:54	
27	2017 ^{HM}	Daniel Gekara (KEN)	1:07:56 ^{HM}	Dehinet Jara (ETH)	1:17:43 ^{HM}	
28	2018	Ezekiel Mutai (KEN)	2:11:05	Salome Nyirarukundo (RWA)	2:28:02	
29	2019	Boniface Kongin (KEN)	2:15:18	Grace Momanyi (KEN)	2:40:51	
30	2022	Gadisa Shumie (ETH)	2:09:25	Melanie Desautels (CAN)	2:53:02	
31	2023	Felex Cheruiyot Rop (KEN)	2:23:20	Monicah Cheruto (KEN)	2:53:47	
32	2024	Philemon Kiptanui (KEN)	2:15:09	Mélanie Desautels (CAN)	2:46:16	

NOTE: 2017 race scheduled as half marathon because of weather conditions. No races in 2020 or 2021 because of Quebec restrictions.

== See also ==
- List of marathon races in North America
