= Oleg Bolokhovets =

Russian long-distance runner

Bolokhovets in 2026

Oleg Valeryevich Bolokhovets (Russian: Олег Валерьевич Болоховец; born April 20, 1976) is a Russian politician and former long-distance runner. He has served as mayor of Kostroma since 16 April 2026. He won the 2004 California International Marathon and competed in the marathon at the 2005 World Championships.

== Achievements ==
Year	Competition	Venue	Position	Notes
Representing Russia
2004	California International Marathon	California State Capitol, United States	1st	Marathon
