= Andriy Toptun =

Ukrainian long-distance runner

Andriy Toptun Andrii Toptun
Personal information
- Born: 31 December 1980 (age 45)

Sport
- Sport: Athletics
- Event(s): Long-distance running, marathon

Achievements and titles
- Personal best(s): Marathon: 2:12:08 (2010); Half marathon: 1:03:27 (2010)

Andriy Toptun or Andrii Toptun (Ukrainian: Андрій Топтун; born 31 December 1980) is a Ukrainian marathon runner. He has won the Moscow Marathon, Philadelphia Marathon, Regensburg Marathon and Nürburgring-Lauf. He has also been runner-up at the Düsseldorf Marathon, California International Marathon, and the Moscow International Peace Marathon. He has represented Ukraine three times at the European Mountain Running Championships.

He won the 2008 Green Bay Marathon, finishing with the time of 2:22:51.

== International competitions ==
Year	Competition	Venue	Position	Event	Notes
2003	European Mountain Running Championships	Trento, Italy	37th	13.5 km	1:13:25
2004	European Mountain Running Championships	Korbielów, Poland	34th	10.3 km	49:13
2005	European Mountain Running Championships	Heiligenblut am Großglockner, Austria	57th	12.95 km	1:21:59
