= Jane Wipf =

American long-distance runner

Jane Wipf (born April 10, 1958) is a retired female long-distance runner from the United States. She won the inaugural 1981 edition of the Enschede Marathon, clocking a total time of 2:38:21.

== Achievements ==
Year	Competition	Venue	Position	Event	Notes
Representing the United States
1981	Boston Marathon	Boston, United States	11th	Marathon	2:38:28
1981	Enschede Marathon	Enschede, Netherlands	1st	Marathon	2:38:21
1981	Tokyo Marathon	Tokyo, Japan	2nd	Marathon	2:38:20
