= Tim Ritchie =

American long-distance runner (born 1987)

Personal information
- Full name: Timothy Ritchie
- Born: August 7, 1987 (age 38) Worcester, Massachusetts, U.S.
- Height: 6 ft 2 in (1.88 m)

Sport
- Country: United States
- Sport: Track, long-distance running
- Event: 5000 m Marathon
- College team: Boston College
- Club: Saucony; Freedom Track Club
- Turned pro: 2010

Achievements and titles
- Personal bests: 5000 m: 14:03.21 10,000 m: 28:54; Half Marathon:1:01:23 Marathon:2:11:56

Timothy Ritchie (born August 7, 1987) is an American athlete who competes in distance running events. Tim Ritchie placed 1st in 2:11:56 at the 2017 California International Marathon. Ritchie is also an NCAA Division I coach for UMass Amherst.

== Professional ==
=== 2017 ===
Tim Ritchie placed 1st in 2:11:56 at the California International Marathon.

=== Major Races ===
Year	Competition	Venue	Position	Event	Notes
2019	New York City Half Marathon	New York City	7th	Half Marathon	1:02:51
2018	2018 New York City Marathon	New York City	15th	Marathon	2:15:22
2018	USATF 20 km Road Championships hosted by New Haven Road Race	New Haven, Connecticut	16th	20 km	1:03:59
2018	2018 Boston Marathon	Boston Massachusetts	DNF	Marathon	DNF
2017	USATF Marathon Road Championships hosted by California International Marathon	Sacramento, California	1st	Marathon	2:11:56
2017	USATF 20 km Road Championships hosted by Faxon Law New Haven Road Race	New Haven, Connecticut	5th	20 km	1:00:58
2017	USATF 25km Road Championships hosted by Fifth Third River Bank	Grand Rapids Michigan	4th	25 km	1:15:12.2
2017	USATF Half Marathon Road Championships hosted by Ohio Health Capital City	Columbus, Ohio	5th	Half Marathon	1:03:29
2017	USATF 15km Road Championships hosted by Gate River Run	Jacksonville, Florida	16th	15 km	45:17
2017	USATF Cross Championships	Bend, Oregon	23rd	10 km	32:05
2016	New York Marathon	New York, New York	19th	Marathon	2:21:09
2016	USATF 10 mile Road Championships hosted by Medtronic TC 10 Mile	Saint Paul, Minnesota	3rd	10 mile	47:33
2016	USATF 20 km Road Championships hosted by Faxon Law New Haven Road Race	New Haven, Connecticut	5th	20 km	59:29
2016	2016 IAAF World Half Marathon Championships	Cardiff, United Kingdom	23rd	Half Marathon	1:03:49
2016	USATF 15km Road Championships hosted by Gate River Run	Jacksonville, Florida	9th	15 km	45:21
2016	USA Olympic Trials Marathon	Los Angeles, California	25th	Marathon	2:22:15
2015	Manchester Road Race	Manchester, Connecticut	5th	7.641 km	21:54.6
2015	Rock 'n' Roll Marathon Series	Philadelphia, Pennsylvania	1st	Half Marathon	1:01:23
2015	USATF 10 mile Road Championships hosted by Medtronic TC 10 Mile	Saint Paul, Minnesota	6th	10 mile	47:19
2015	USATF 20 km Road Championships hosted by Faxon Law New Haven Road Race	New Haven, Connecticut	15th	20 km	1:02:06
2015	2015 USA Outdoor Track and Field Championships	Eugene, Oregon	24th	10 km	30:29.88
2014	USATF 15km Road Championships hosted by Gate River Run	Jacksonville, Florida	3rd	15 km	43:24
2014	USA Indoor Track and Field Championships	Albuquerque, New Mexico	14th	3 km	8:25.03
2014	USA Half Marathon Championships hosted by Aramco Houston Half Marathon	Houston, Texas	9th	Half Marathon	1:02:00
2013	USATF 15km Road Championships hosted by .US National Road Racing Championships	Alexandria, Virginia	6th	12 km	34:46
2013	USATF Marathon Road Championships hosted by Twin Cities Marathon	Minneapolis-Saint Paul, Minnesota	6th	Marathon	2:14:50
2013	USATF Marathon Road Championships hosted by CVS Caremark Downtown	Providence, Rhode Island	6th	5 km	14:04.0
2013	USATF 20 km Road Championships hosted by Faxon Law New Haven Road Race	New Haven, Connecticut	8th	20 km	1:02:05
2013	USATF Half Marathon Road Championships hosted by Duluth Half Marathon	Duluth, Minnesota	3rd	Half Marathon	1:02:28
2013	Boston Marathon	Boston, Massachusetts	25th	Marathon	2:21:31
2013	USATF 15km Road Championships hosted by Gate River Run	Jacksonville, Florida	6th	15 km	44:01
2012	USATF National Club Cross Country Championships	Lexington, Kentucky	26th	10 km	31:10.5
2012	USATF 10 mile Road Championships hosted by Medtronic Twin Cities 10 mile	Minneapolis-Saint Paul, Minnesota	3rd	10 mile	47:25
2012	USATF Half Marathon Championships hosted by Grandma's Half Marathon	Duluth, Minnesota	5th	Half Marathon	1:03:57
2012	USATF 15km Road Championships hosted by Gate River Run	Jacksonville, Florida	2nd	15 km	44:41

== Boston College ==
Ritchie placed 5th in 2010 Intercollegiate Association of Amateur Athletes of America 1500 meters championship final in 3:50.51 as a senior Boston College Eagles. Ritchie placed 9th in 2010 Stanford University Invitational 5000 meters in 14:03.21.

== Early life and education ==
Tim Ritchie placed 4th as a senior at Doherty Memorial High School at MIAA All State Cross Country Championships November 20, 2004 at Gardner Municipal Golf Course in Gardner, Massachusetts.
