= Jane Kibii =

Kenyan long-distance runner (born 1985)

Jane Kibii (born March 10, 1985) is a Kenyan long-distance runner who competes in marathon races and other road running events. She is from Moiben. Kibii has won the California International Marathon, the Twin Cities Marathon (twice), and Grandma's Marathon along with several other top 10 finishes in major marathons. Kibii has also won several competitive half marathons, and dominated fast "SacTown" 10 mile race in Sacramento, California. Her lifetime prize winnings total more than $100,000.

== Early life ==
Kibii started running at age eight, from home to school in a daily commute. She joined the cross country and track teams in her Kenyan hometown and won her first race in Uganda, taking home $200, an amount of money she had never seen at that point in her life. Kibii splits her time between Kenya and Auburn, California, with her daughter. She has been open about the challenge of being a professional runner and a single parent. She gained a unique sponsorship as a professional runner: a solar panel company, BioLite, sponsored her as she sought to get electricity in her rural home in Kenya.

She has saved most of her earnings from competitive running to build her parents a home in Kenya. She is also sponsored by BioLite which is lighting, cooking, and energy products (solar lighting) for off the grid communities and camping.

== Career ==
After competing in track during high school in Kenya, Kibii transitioned to longer runs and moved to the United States. In 2009, she won the Carlsbad Half-Marathon from 2009 in a time of 1:12:33. Her first marathon was in the same year: the Rock 'n' Roll Las Vegas Marathon. She finished fifth in 2:40:12. She continued her training and began getting faster.

She returned to Carlsbad and won the half marathon again, in 2010 and 2011. Also in 2011, she finished fourth place at the Philadelphia Half Marathon with a time of 1:10:25.

In 2014, Kibii raced the California International Marathon and finished second.

In 2015, she won the Bay to Breakers 12K. In a breakthrough, she raced Grandma's Marathon in the summer. She kept ahead of Lindsey Scherf and passed Sarah Kiptoo in the last mile to win in 2:32:06, netting $11,500.

In 2016, Kibii won the San Diego Half Marathon in 1:14:47. She also raced the Twin Cities Marathon in Minnesota, which had more than 10,000 runners registered. She won in a (then) personal best time of 2:30:01. She returned in 2017, and she defended her title.

In 2017, Kibii finished 2nd in the Los Angeles Marathon.

In 2018, she repeated her win in the Bay to Breakers 12K.

In 2019, Kibii finished second at the New Orleans Half Marathon, fifth at Los Angeles Marathon and first in the SacTown 10 Mile race for the fifth year in a row. At CIM, she lined up as the favorite and crossed the finish line with a new PR: 2:29:31.

In 2020, the Sacramento Running Association named Kibii the 2019 Athlete of the Year. She went on to place 3rd in the Los Angeles Marathon (2:36:04), one of the last major races to run before the COVID-19 pandemic canceled or postponed races across the world.
