= Des Moines Marathon =

Annual marathon in Des Moines, Iowa, US

- Date: Mid-October
- Location: Des Moines, Iowa, United States
- Event type: Road
- Distance: Marathon/half marathon
- Established: 2002
- Course records: Men: 2:12:19 (2014); Philip Lagat; Women: 2:32:28 (2014); Abnet Simegn
- Website: www.desmoinesmarathon.com
- Participants: 9,000+

The IMT Des Moines Marathon is a marathon held annually in downtown Des Moines, Iowa. It serves as a qualifier for the Boston Marathon.

Race weekend features the Mercy Live Up Loop 5-Mile Run & 1-Mile Walk and Mercy Children's Hospital & Clinics 1-Mile Youth Run and Jingle Jog on Saturday followed by the IMT Des Moines Marathon & Half Marathon, Bankers Trust Marathon Relay and Principal 5K Road Race on Sunday.

All races start and finish in the heart of downtown Des Moines and feature scenic courses boasting the Des Moines skyline, city parks and residential neighborhoods.

The first running of the marathon was held in 2002. More than 9,000 athletes participated in the 2013 races.

The marathon was cancelled in 2020 due to the COVID-19 pandemic. In 2021, the race celebrated its 20th anniversary with IMT DSM Marathon designed medals.

== Men's winners ==
| Year | Athlete | Country/state | Time | Notes |
|---|---|---|---|---|
| 2002 | Simon Sawe | Kenya | 2:22:57 | |
| 2003 | Wilson Gatiha | United States | 2:26:04 | |
| 2004 | Sergey Nochevny | Russia | 2:27:34 | |
| 2005 | Diego Vanegas | United States | 2:35:57 | |
| 2006 | Jared Nyamboki | United States | 2:23:36 | |
| 2007 | David Chepkwony | United States | 2:22:57 | tied course record |
| 2008 | Geoffrey Kiprotich | Kenya | 2:23:55 | |
| 2009 | Simon Sawe | Kenya | 2:24:50 | 2nd victory |
| 2010 | James Kirwa | Kenya | 2:14:20 | course record |
| 2011 | James Kirwa | Kenya | 2:12:54 | 2nd victory, course record |
| 2012 | James Kirwa | Kenya | 2:16:54 | 3rd victory |
| 2013 | David Tuwei | Kenya | 2:17:23 | |
| 2014 | Philip Lagat | Kenya | 2:12:19 | course record |
| 2015 | Philip Lagat | Kenya | 2:21:02 | 2nd victory |
| 2016 | Boaz Kipyego | Kenya | 2:16:36 | |
| 2017 | Luke Kibet | Kenya | 2:21:32 | |
| 2018 | Enock Birir | Kenya | 2:23:39 | |
| 2019 | William Mutai | Kenya | 2:23:01 | |
| 2020 | Cancelled | | | Not held due to COVID-19 pandemic |
| 2021 | David Too | Kenya | 2:16:19 | |
| 2022 | Sammy Rotich | Kenya | 2:19:28 | |
| 2023 | Abraham Kipkemei | Kenya | 2:25:24 | |
| 2024 | Kallin Carolus Khan | United States | 2:22:59 | |

== Women's winners ==
| Year | Athlete | Country/state | Time | Notes |
|---|---|---|---|---|
| 2002 | Wendy Hall | United States | 2:50:38 | |
| 2003 | Wendy Hall | United States | 2:49:46 | 2nd victory, female record |
| 2004 | Christy Nielsen | United States | 2:47:01 | female record |
| 2005 | Wendy Terris | United States | 2:55:50 | |
| 2006 | Robyn Friedman | United States | 2:42:19 | female record |
| 2007 | Melissa Gillette | United States | 3:00:51 | |
| 2008 | Wendy Terris | United States | 2:49:37 | 2nd victory |
| 2009 | Robyn Friedman | United States | 2:41:28 | 2nd victory, female record |
| 2010 | Alena Vinitskaya | Belarus | 2:41:23 | female record |
| 2011 | Atalelech Asfaw | Ethiopia | 2:37:55 | female record |
| 2012 | Mary Akor | United States | 2:35:01 | female record |
| 2013 | Natalia Sokolova | Russia | 2:33:03 | female record |
| 2014 | Abnet Simegn | Ethiopia | 2:32:28 | female record |
| 2015 | Biruktait Degefa | Ethiopia | 2:33:00 | |
| 2016 | Olga Kimaiyo | Kenya | 2:34:10 | |
| 2017 | Joan Massah | Kenya | 2:42:43 | |
| 2018 | Joan Massah | Kenya | 2:46:19 | 2nd victory |
| 2019 | Hirut Guangul | Ethiopia | 2:39:50 | |
| 2020 | Cancelled | | | Not held due to COVID-19 pandemic |
| 2021 | Hirut Guangul | Ethiopia | 2:36:05 | 2nd victory |
| 2022 | Damaris Areba | Ethiopia | 2:32:33 | |
| 2023 | Leah Rotich | Kenya | 2:42:41 | |
| 2024 | Angela Chaney | United States | 2:52:29 | |
