= Kansas City Marathon =

Annual race in the United States held since 1979

- Date: October
- Location: Kansas City, Missouri, U.S.
- Event type: Road
- Distance: Marathon
- Primary sponsor: Garmin
- Established: 1979 (47 years ago)
- Website: https://sportkc.org/marathon
- Participants: 1227 finishers (2019)

The Kansas City Marathon is a 26.2-mile (42.2 km) race held the 3rd Saturday of every October in Kansas City, Missouri, United States. First held in 1979, it is the second largest marathon in Missouri. An official time from the Kansas City Marathon can be used to qualify for the Boston Marathon.

It includes a 5K, 10K and half-marathon in addition to the traditional marathon race.

== History ==
The marathon was first held in 1979 as the Macy's Marathon.

The first Kansas City Marathon was held May 6, 1984 and was won by John Case in 2:35:01 and Connie Burroughs in 3:19:57. <Kansas City Star May 7, 1984, Section C, page 1).

In 2005, the marathon was just under 0.4 mi (0.64 km) short.

The 2020 in-person edition of the race was cancelled due to the coronavirus pandemic, with all registrants given the option of transferring their entry to 2021, or entering a charity running program and obtaining a partial refund.

== Course ==
While the course varies from year to year, it generally involves running from Crown Center through downtown, turning to Midtown to Westport. From Westport, it continues on to the Plaza, then out to Waldo, returns to the 18th and Vine district, and ends on Main Street by Pershing.

== Qualification ==
Runners must be at least 16 years old to run the full marathon, at least 14 years old to run the half marathon and all ages can run the 5 and 10K.

== Winners ==
=== Marathon ===
Year	Male	Time	Female	Time	Rf.
1979	Robert Busby	2:20:34	Andrea Ray	2:58:30	
1980	Robert Busby (2)	2:20:49	Andrea Ray (2)	2:49:26	
1981	Robert Busby (3)	2:23:43	Andrea Ray (3)	2:52:13	
1982	Brian Franke	2:23:48	Andrea Ray (4)	2:53:26	
1983	Michael Clay	2:20:43	Ellen Makarewicz	2:39:50	
1984	Brian Franke (2)	2:20:12	Liz Bulman	2:48:02	
1985					
1986	Domenico Massari	2:24:01	Andrea Ray (5)		
1987	Phillip Kauder	2:27:55	Lora Carr	3:07:55	
1988	Demetrio Cabanillas	2:21:26	Annette Craighead	2:52:14	
1989	Brad Hawthorne	2:23:09	Kathryn Evans	2:49:39	
1990	Rolf Schmidt	2:20:30	Ann Ringlein	2:50:55	
1991	Jerrold Wynia	2:20:19	Barbara Adkins	2:56:32	
1992	Jerrold Wynia (2)	2:25:24	Tamara Karliakova	2:41:12	
1993	John Hill	2:22:21	Barbara Rinne	2:54:29	
1994	Paul Danger	2:32:11	Marla Rhoden	2:55:53	
1995	Ladd McClain	2:25:37	Shari Wolwood	3:00:59	
1996	Todd Beran	2:26:19	Lori Robertson	3:04:46	
1997	Sean Birren	2:28:53	Jennifer Mullen	3:15:33	
1998	Shawn Standridge	2:45:53	Jennifer Mullen (2)	3:18:46	
1999	Phil Hudnall	2:28:17	Patricia Nelson	3:12:38	
2000	Nate Stroot	2:38:36	Carol Baker	3:12:54	
2001	marathon was not held				
2002	Michael Van Dusen	2:52:11	Lindsay Brogan	3:11:36	
2003	Rikki Hacker	2:32:53	Jessica Grider	3:15:40	
2004	marathon was not held				
2005	Shadrack Kimeli	2:42:50	Valerie Gortmaker	3:06:34	
2006	Thad Bartram	2:40:01	Lisa Cowling	3:12:54	
2007	Peter Sercer	2:30:41	Heidi Bryant	3:08:46	
2008	Zachary Breitenstein	2:34:42	Rael Murrey	2:53:04	
2009	Trey Vernon	2:34:46	Amy Bricco	3:14:12	
2010	Moninda Marube	2:31:59	Ann Marie Chappell	2:50:22	
2011	Jae Yung Hyung	2:28:41	Megan Earney	2:55:53	
2012	Paul Hefferson	2:31:37	Julie Thorton	3:07:40	
2013	Geoffery Kiprotich	2:25:56	Cheri Madsen	2:26:18	
2014	Geoffery Kiprotich (2)	2:25:56	Madeline Glass	2:56:37	
2015	Peter Kiplagat Chebet	2:29:11	Ashley Wickman	3:03:09	
2016	Brian Lewis	2:43:26	Alice Anderson	3:04:18	
2017	Luis Rivera	2:32:37	Brittany Charboneau	2:51:32	
2018	Ron Malik	2:31:57	Emma Hauser	3:01:57	
2019	Martin Erl	2:24:08	Michaela Parisi	2:59:47	
2020	cancelled due to coronavirus pandemic				
2021	Nicholas Victor	2:25:39	Piper Parres	3:02:46	
2022	Kyle Baldwin	2:42:58	Kaitlyn Shea	2:57:01	
2023	Jason Fambrough	2:28:43	Samantha Farmer	2:48:28	
2024	Jacob Cofer	2:28:30	Mary Katherine Andrews	2:47:48	

=== Half marathon ===
Year	Male	Time	Female	Time	Rf.
2006	Mathew Chesang	1:08:05	Christine Ensian	1:21:04	
2007	William K Serem	1:09:16	Nicole Cueno	1:18:45	
2008	Richard Kandie	1:08:58	Ann Marie Chappell	1:18:06	
2009	Matt Dunlavy	1:09:43	Nicki Klein	1:27:25	
2010	Mathew Chesang (2)	1:09:20	Pip Taylor	1:22:25	
2011	Mathew Chesang (3))	1:10:13	Ajok Deng	1:23:26	
2012	Benson Chesang	1:11:12	Kathryn Brake	1:26:57	
2013	Geofrey Terer	1:08:47	Hayley Sutter	1:21:32	
2014	Yusuf Kamel	1:08:25	Pasca Myers	1:16:15	
2015	Nicholas Too	1:06:54	Jebichi Yator	1:16:18	
2016	John Thompson	1:14:14	Sarah Madsen	1:29:10	
2017	Austin Bogina	1:12:25	Amy Regan	1:18:51	
2018	Joseph Morre	1:09:01	Stephanie Andre	1:18:35	
2019	Joseph Morre (2)	1:06:36	Jessica Allen	1:19:14	
2020	cancelled due to coronavirus pandemic				
2021	Joseph Morre (3)	1:09:32	Jessica Allen (2)	1:21:37	
2022	Spencer Danielson	1:12:47	Chandler Carreon	1:23:36	
2023	Noah Stevenson	1:09:15	Christina Sharp	1:25:52	
2024	Noah Stevenson	1:07:53	Christina Sharp	1:23:30	
