= America's Finest City Half Marathon =

San Diego's annual half marathon

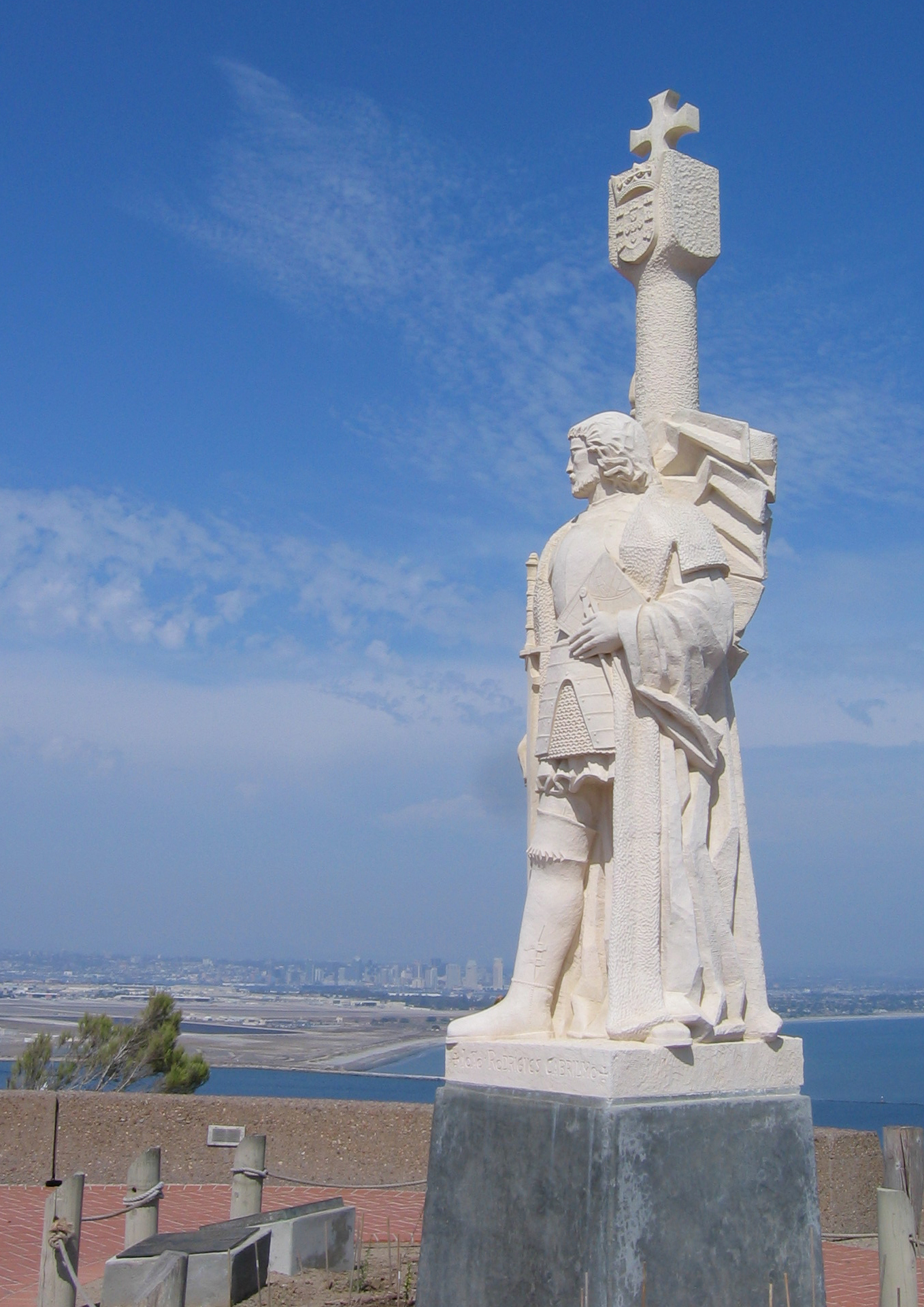
- Cabrillo National Monument, the race's start point
- Date: August
- Location: San Diego
- Event type: Road
- Distance: Half marathon
- Established: 1978
- Website: America's Finest City Half Marathon

America's Finest City Half Marathon is an annual half marathon race held in San Diego, California. ("America's Finest City" is the official nickname of San Diego.) It was established in 1978. The event includes a 5K run.

== History ==
America's Finest City Half Marathon was inaugurated in 1978 and has been held every year since then. By 1985, more than 6000 professional and amateur runners were taking part in the race each year. The race is used to raise money for the American Lung Association and in its first fourteen years of existence it had cumulatively raised US$1.7 million for the nonprofit organization.

The race was sponsored by Home Federal Bank in the 1980s and early 1990s. The race's organizers endured financial difficulties in 1992 after the loss of its title sponsor. The race remained popular, however, and the following year over five thousand runners took part; among them was talk show host Oprah Winfrey, running under the pseudonym "Bobbi Jo Jenkins" and accompanied by a bodyguard, a trainer, and a video crew.

At the 33rd edition in 2010, the half marathon and 5K races attracted an international field of almost 10,000 runners and the event had raised $3.8 million for non-profit organizations. That year, Ethiopian training partners Ezkyas Sisay and Belaynesh Zemedkun topped the men's and women's fields respectively.

Kenyan Nelson Oyugi holds the men's half marathon course record of 1:01:59, while Belaynesh Zemedkun is the women's record holder with her time of 1:10:28. The men's race has been dominated by Kenyans, with 13 wins since the mid-1990s, but Americans are historically strong on the women's side with 17 race wins. The United States has produced the most winners overall, with 25 of the half marathon's winners hailing from the host country. Patrick Muturi of Kenya is the only man to win the race twice. Maria Trujillo has the most wins to her name, having won the race on four occasions.

A virtual race was held in 2020, and entrants were given the option to receive either a refund or defer their entry to 2021.

== Race ==
The course of the half marathon has a point-to-point format. It starts on the Point Loma peninsula next to Cabrillo National Monument – some 300 feet (91 m) above sea-level. The course heads north and descends towards San Diego Bay. Turning eastwards onto North Harbor Drive, the race enters a flat straight around the five mile (8 km) mark. After looping around Harbor Island, the course heads south, passing near Star of India. It traces a path northwards at this point, heading along Sixth Avenue and Laurel Street on its way to downtown San Diego. The race's finishing point is Pan American Plaza in Balboa Park.

== Past half marathon winners ==
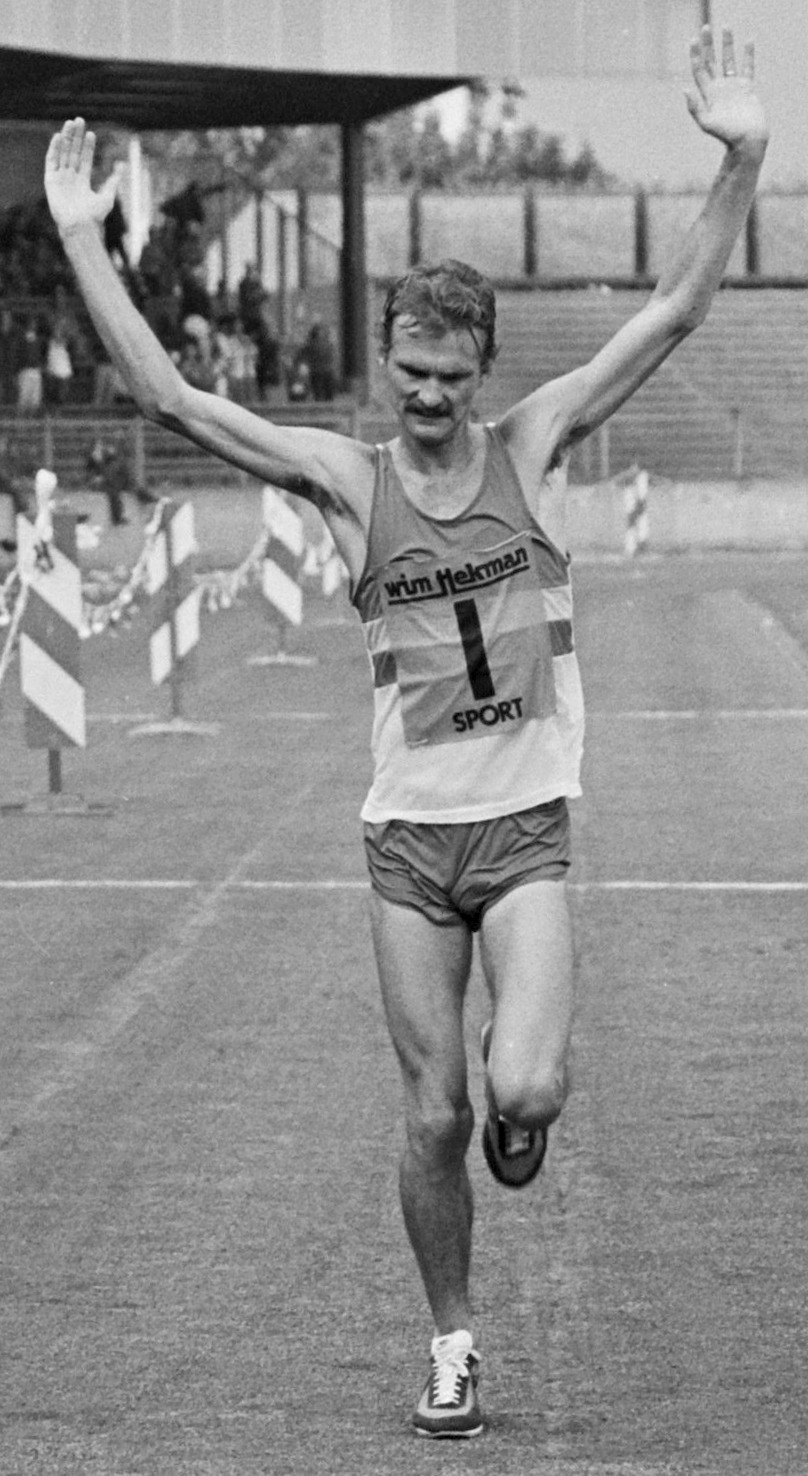
America's Kirk Pfeffer won the 1981 edition.

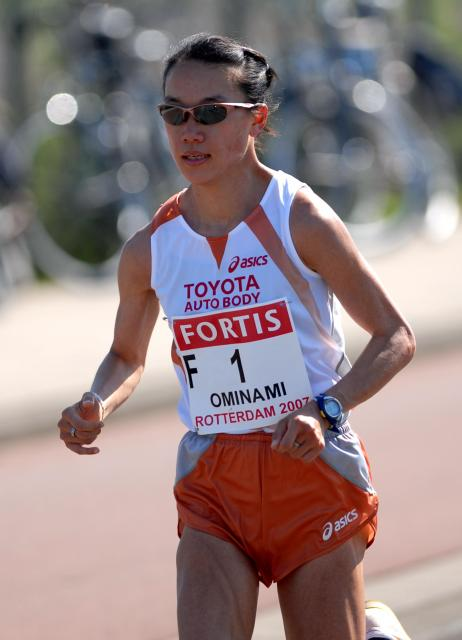
Japan's Hiromi Ominami won the women's race twice consecutively between 2007 and 2008.

Key: Course record

Edition	Year	Men's winner	Time (h:m:s)	Women's winner	Time (h:m:s)
1st	1978	Ben Wilson (USA)	1:06:36	Marty Cooksey (USA)	1:15:04
2nd	1979	Gary Close (USA)	1:06:36	Kathy Mintie (USA)	1:14:50
3rd	1980 †	Terry Cotton (USA)	1:06:20	Laurie Binder (USA)	1:17:43
4th	1981	Kirk Pfeffer (USA)	1:02:55	Elizabeth Baker (USA)	1:17:02
5th	1982	Domingo Tibaduiza (COL)	1:03:46	Laura DeWald (USA)	1:16:55
6th	1983	Rick Musgrave (USA)	1:04:08	Nancy Ditz (USA)	1:14:31
7th	1984	Ibrahim Kivina (TAN)	1:03:36	Carol McLatchie (USA)	1:15:06
8th	1985	Jerry Kiernan (IRL)	1:03:15	Laurie Binder (USA)	1:17:43
9th	1986	Joel Hernández (MEX)	1:03:41	Terry Adams (SUI)	1:16:22
10th	1987	Marty Froelick (USA)	1:04:31	Maria Trujillo (USA)	1:15:17
11th	1988	Carlos Retiz (MEX)	1:03:40	Sylvia Mosqueda (USA)	1:11:31
12th	1989	Alejandro Cruz (MEX)	1:03:56	Maria Trujillo (USA)	1:13:41
13th	1990	José Luis Chuela (MEX)	1:04:38	Laura LaMena (USA)	1:13:00
14th	1991	Rafael Muñoz (MEX)	1:04:06	Kathleen Bowman (USA)	1:14:18
15th	1992	Jose Marcos Camargo (BRA)	1:08:36	Laura LaMena (USA)	1:16:23
16th	1993	Alfredo Vigueras (USA)	1:04:32	Maria Trujillo (USA)	1:16:17
17th	1994	Patrick Muturi (KEN)	1:03:33	Roseli Machado (BRA)	1:14:44
18th	1995	Driss Dacha (MAR)	1:05:11	Lisa Ondieki (AUS)	1:12:52
19th	1996	John Kagwe (KEN)	1:03:28	Mari Tanigawa (JPN)	1:13:11
20th	1997	Patrick Muturi (KEN)	1:02:51	Maria Trujillo (USA)	1:15:04
21st	1998	Jonathan Ndambuki (KEN)	1:03:16	Taeko Terauchi (JPN)	1:14:29
22nd	1999	Simon Sawe (KEN)	1:03:22	Tina Connelly (CAN)	1:14:04
23rd	2000	Peter Githuka Mwangi (KEN)	1:02:24	Cristina Pomacu (ROM)	1:10:44
24th	2001	Wilson Onsare (KEN)	1:02:45	Margaret Okayo (KEN)	1:10:38
25th	2002	Mbarak Hussein (KEN)	1:03:00	Sylvia Mosqueda (USA)	1:12:34
26th	2003	Kazuhiro Matsuda (JPN)	1:03:57	Silvia Skvortsova (RUS)	1:14:24
27th	2004	Joseph Matui Kiprono (KEN)	1:04:25	Alevtina Ivanova (RUS)	1:15:01
28th	2005	Nephat Kinyanjui (KEN)	1:03:18	Tatyana Chulakh (RUS)	1:13:35
29th	2006	Wilson Chebet Kwambai (KEN)	1:02:38	Tatyana Chulakh (RUS)	1:14:12
30th	2007	Nelson Kiplagat Birgen (KEN)	1:04:25	Hiromi Ominami (JPN)	1:12:49
31st	2008	Justin Young (USA)	1:05:46	Hiromi Ominami (JPN)	1:12:47
32nd	2009	Ernest Kiprugut Kebenei (KEN)	1:04:01	Belaynesh Zemedkun (ETH)	1:10:49
33rd	2010	Eskyas Sisay (ETH)	1:03:58	Belaynesh Zemedkun (ETH)	1:10:28
34th	2011	Tesfaye Sendiku Alemayehu (ETH)	1:03:44	Paula Whiting (NZL)	1:16:47
35th	2012	Weldon Kirui (KEN)	1:03:18	Mary Akor (USA)	1:17:17
36th	2013	Nelson Oyugi (KEN)	1:01:59	Wendy Thomas (USA)	1:13:15
37th	2014	Nelson Oyugi (KEN)	1:05:17	Lindsey Scherf (USA)	1:14:33
38th	2015	Kevin Kochei (KEN)	1:04:19	Janet Bawcom (USA)	1:12:24
39th	2016	Eliud Ngetich (KEN)	1:04:10	Jane Kibii (KEN)	1:14:47
40th	2017	Boniface Kongin (KEN)	1:03:25	Diana Kipyokei (KEN)	1:11:02
41st	2018	Juan Pacheco (MEX)	1:05:37	Jane Kibii (KEN)	1:14:25
42nd	2019	Daniel Teklebrhan (ERI)	1:02:37	Misaki Hayashida (JPN)	1:13:45
43rd	2021	Jason Intravaia (USA)	1:06:48	Nell Rojas (USA)	1:11:43
44th	2022	Chad Hall (USA)	1:05:12	Sophie Payne (USA)	1:19:00

- † = The 1980 course was mis-marked and was around 800 metres longer than the true half marathon distance.

== Statistics ==
=== Winners by country ===
Country	Men's race	Women's race	Total
United States	10	22	31
Kenya	18	4	22
Mexico	6	0	6
Japan	1	5	6
Russia	0	4	4
Ethiopia	2	2	4
Brazil	1	1	2
Australia	0	1	1
Canada	0	1	1
Colombia	1	0	1
Ireland	1	0	1
Morocco	1	0	1
New Zealand	0	1	1
Romania	0	1	1
Switzerland	0	1	1
Tanzania	1	0	1
Eritrea	0	1	1

=== Multiple winners ===
Athlete	Country	Wins	Years
Patrick Muturi	Kenya	2	1994, 1997
Maria Trujillo	United States	4	1987, 1989, 1993, 1997
Laurie Binder	United States	2	1980, 1985
Laura LaMena	United States	2	1990, 1992
Sylvia Mosqueda	United States	2	1988, 2002
Tatyana Chulakh	Russia	2	2005, 2006
Hiromi Ominami	Japan	2	2007, 2008
Belaynesh Zemedkun	Ethiopia	2	2009, 2010
Nelson Oyugi	Kenya	2	2013, 2014
Jane Kibii	Kenya	2	2016, 2018
