= Serkalem Biset Abrha =

Ethiopian long-distance runner

Serkalem Biset Abrha, also known as Abrha Serkalem Biset, (born 8 March 1987) is a runner from Ethiopia who competes in long distance running and has won several major international marathons.

== Running career ==
Abrha's first major races outside of Ethiopia were in India's Delhi International Half Marathon and the Standard Chartered Lahore 10K from 2005 to 2007. She finished second in the half marathon in 2006, winning $1,000.

In 2008, Abrha won the Maas Marathon (Dutch:Maasmarathon of the Basse-Meuse) in rural Visé, Belgium.

Later that year, she raced the Hartford Marathon in Connecticut. More than 5,000 runners started out from Bushnell Park at 8 a.m. for the 15th annual race. The racers crossed the Connecticut River, traveled north through East Hartford and South Windsor before doubling back and crossing the Founders Bridge once again. As Abrha ran back into Bushnell Park and under the Soldiers and Sailors Memorial Arch toward the finish line, it was clear she was the dominant winner. Her time was 2:38:37.

In 2009, she went to Georgia for the Atlanta Marathon. More than 15,000 people were signed up to run, and the start promised fast times as the temperature hovered in the 40-degree range. Abrha lead all the women and won the $3,000 purse prize.

She came to New York in 2009, where she faced tough competition in the New York City Marathon. Still, she ran a 2:37:20. She finished eighth, winning $5,000. She was just behind Ethiopian Bizunesh Deba, one of her training partners.

In 2010, she finished third at the Las Vegas Marathon, putting her in the winnings with $4,000 and a stronger national profile. She followed that with finishing third (2:33:52) in the Barcelona Marathon in Spain. The top four female racers were Ethiopian, and they finished several minutes before the next runner from Kenya.

In 2011, she won the California International Marathon in Sacramento, California. She would repeat the win again in 2015, winning $10,000 for her time of 2:31:29.

Back in 2010, she surprised Canadian spectators by winning the 20th running of the Marathon Oasis de Montreal. She was back in 2011 to claim the title again, this time in 2:33:21. In the 2011 race report, the Montreal Gazette inexplicably claimed that she was 17, though World Athletics showed her birth date to be 1987, and they reported a year earlier that she was 23.

NYC marathon in 2011 saw Ethiopian runners Firehiwot Dado and Deba finish first and second—Abrha was 15th with a time of 2:33:22.

In October 2015, she came to the Midwest for the Twin Cities Marathon from Minneapolis to St. Paul. The cities had been roiling for weeks with Black Lives Matter protests due to large socioeconomic gaps between the Black community and all others in the region. Protest leaders threatened to disrupt the marathon near the finish line, prompting concern for the race organizers and 15,000 race participants. However, an agreement was reached, and the St. Paul Black Lives Matter group agreed to stage a "die-in" near the finish line instead of blocking the race course. Abrah lead the women and won in 2:31:39, just a few seconds ahead of Kenyan Jane Kibii.

In the late 2010s, some of her other notable achievements were winning first place in the Staten Island Half Marathon on 8 October 2017, with the time 1:16:26; winning third place in the female category for the France Run 8K on 20 August 2017, in Central Park with the time of 32:01; and winning second place in the Hope & Possibility 4K Race on 25 June 2017, (also in Central Park) with the time 22:20. She finished in the top three in multiple major marathons, including her second-place finish at the 2016 LA Marathon.

She had another marathon win in 2017 when she sped past the other competitors to win the overall race of the Cleveland Marathon held on 21 May.

One of her greatest achievements was winning first place at the 2018 Philadelphia Marathon in 2:14:47, which set a course record.

== Personal life ==
She has trained with Bizunesh Deba, Genna Tufa, and Atalelech Asfaw in New York and in the high altitude of Albuquerque, New Mexico. Part of her training has included seasonal trips over the winter to Addis Ababa, Ethiopia, to run at high altitudes with her training partners. In 2012 August 14 Serkalem had her first baby and it was a boy that she and her husband Genna tufa decided to name Daniel shortly after she began to run professionally again after having her first ever baby she was truly one of a kind she started to run in competitions in 2015 and when Covid hit she began to stop running and took time from running professionally to spend time with her family Now let's talk about Serkalem's family first she has boy named Daniel born on 14 August 2012, she has a husband named Genna tufa and her mother's name is ayalensh asefa her fathers name is Biset Abrha.

== Achievements ==
Year	Competition	Venue	Position	Event	Notes
2006	Delhi Half Marathon	New Delhi, India	2nd	Half Marathon	1:15:06
2008	Marathon of the Basse-Meuse	Vise, Belgium	1st	Marathon	2:58:23
2008	Hartford Marathon	Hartford, Connecticut	1st	Marathon	2:38:37
2009	Atlanta Marathon	Atlanta, Georgia	1st	Marathon	2:41:31
2011	Montreal Marathon	Montreal, Canada	1st	Marathon	2:35:45
2011	IAAF World Cross-Country Championships	Punta Umbria, Spain	96th	8K	30:47
2011	California International Marathon	Sacramento, California	1st	Marathon	2:33:40
2015	26.2 with Donna	Jacksonville Beach, Florida	1st	Marathon	2:39:11
2015	Twin Cities Marathon	St. Paul, Minnesota	1st	Marathon	2:31:40
2015	California International Marathon	Sacramento, California	1st	Marathon	2:31:50
2016	Grandma's Marathon	Duluth, Minnesota	2nd	Marathon	2:34:20
2017	Cleveland Marathon	Cleveland, Ohio	1st	Marathon	2:42:08
2017	Pikes Peak Ascent	Manitou Springs, Colorado	1st	21.4K	2:42:22
2018	Philadelphia Marathon	Philadelphia, Pennsylvania	1st	Marathon	2:32:53
