= California International Marathon =

Annual race in the United States held since 1983

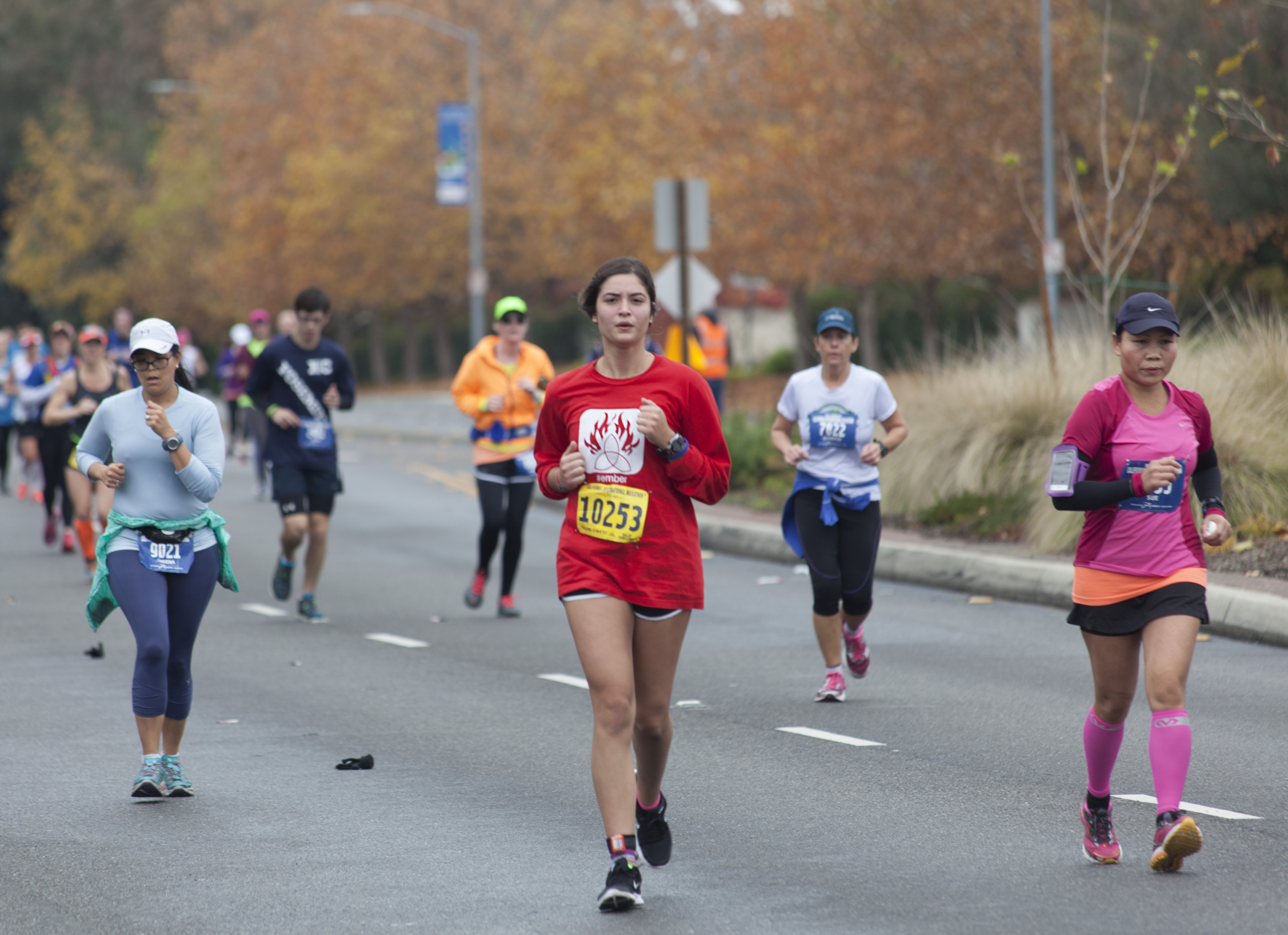
- Runners at the 2015 CIM
- Date: December
- Location: between Folsom and Sacramento, California, United States
- Event type: Road
- Distance: Marathon
- Established: 1983 (43 years ago)
- Course records: M: 2:07:35 (2024) (United States) Tsegay Weldlibanos; F: 2:24:28 (2024) (United States) Calli Hauger-Thackery
- Website: https://runsra.org/california-international-marathon/

The California International Marathon (CIM) is an annual road marathon (42.195 km (26.219 mi)) held in Northern California since 1983. The net downhill course starts at Folsom Dam and ends at the State Capitol in Sacramento. The race is organized by the Sacramento Running Association.

With just under 10,000 finishers, it is one of the ten largest marathons in the United States.

== History ==
In 1983, marathoner John Mansoor and entrepreneur Sally Edwards organized the first CIM, anticipating an opportunity to also be an Olympic Marathon Trials qualifier. CIM served as the United States National Marathon Championship for men in 1984 and for women in 1984, 1985, 1989, and 1993. It has again served as the USATF National Marathon Championship in 2017, 2018, 2022, 2025, and will again in 2026.

The 2020 edition of the race was cancelled due to the coronavirus pandemic, with all registrants given the option of transferring their entry to 2021, 2022, or 2023.

The men's course record was held for over 20 years, by American Jerry Lawson (2:10:27, 1993), until it was broken in 2024 by Ethiopia's Tsegay Weldlibanos (2:07.35).

On December 5, 2021, Sara Vaughn broke the women's course record, which had stood for 8 years, with a winning time of 2:26:53. The following year, Paige Stoner broke the record by 51 seconds running the race in a time of 2:26:02.The record was broken again in 2025, by marathon debutant, Molly Born.

== Course ==
External image
- Course map of full marathon in 2015

The course follows a historic gold miners' round beginning at Folsom Dam, passing through suburban Sacramento, and ending at the State Capitol. The race starts at an elevation of 366 ft (112 m) and finishes at an elevation of 26 ft (7.9 m).

== Winners ==
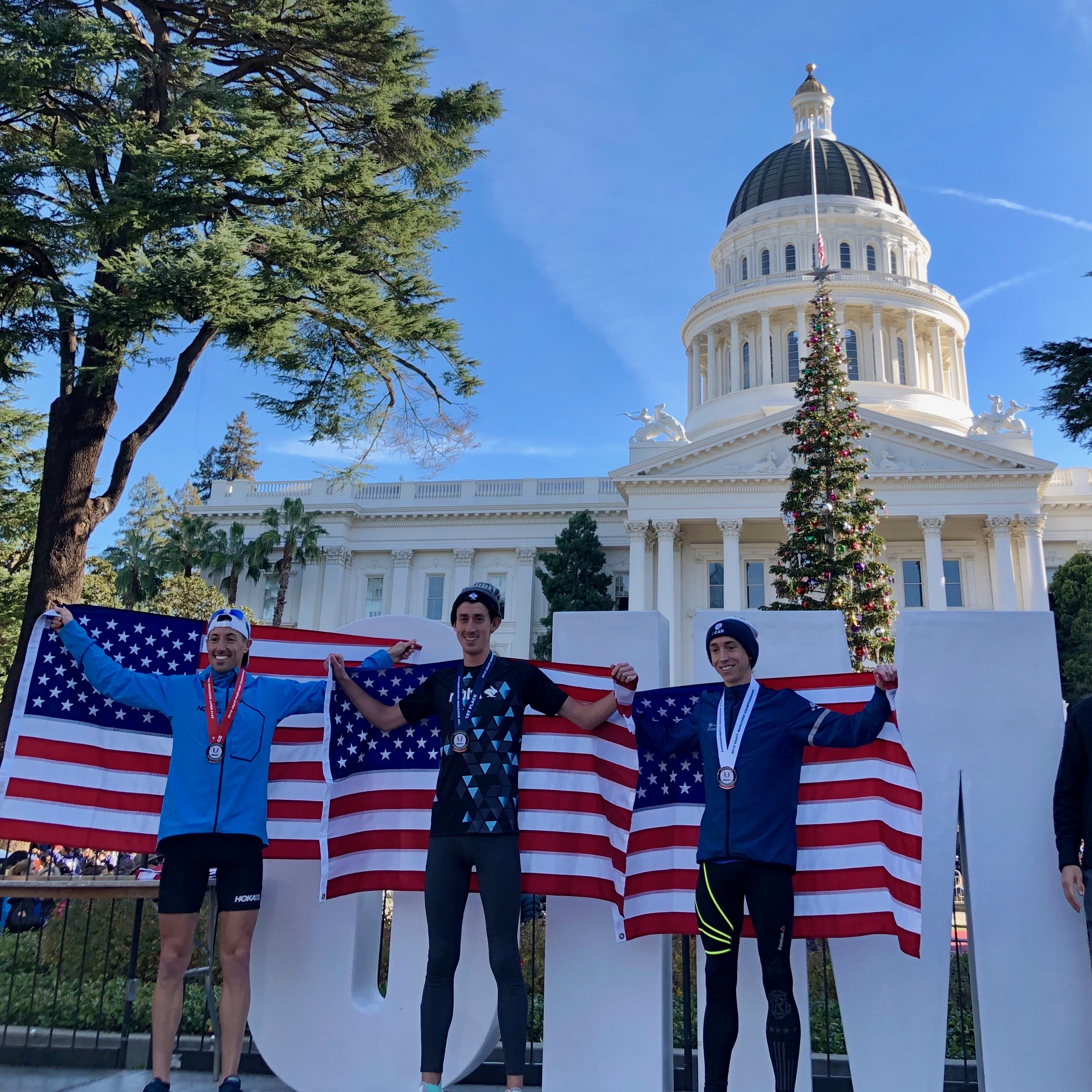
Runners on the podium in 2018, including winner Brogan Austin

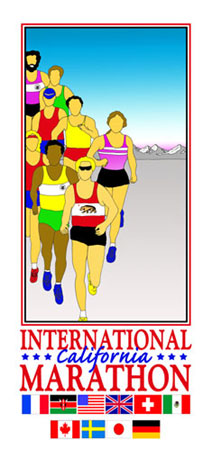
1988 CIM artwork

Key: Course record

Date	Men's winner	Country	Time	Women's winner	Country	Time
December 4, 1983	Martti Kiilholma	Finland	2:13:35	Gabriele Anderson	Switzerland	2:33:25
December 2, 1984	Ken Martin	United States	2:11:24	Katy Schilly	United States	2:32:40
December 8, 1985	Peter Butler	Canada	2:10:56	Nancy Ditz	United States	2:31:36
December 7, 1986	Danny Gonzalez	United States	2:13:20	Christa Vahlensieck	Germany	2:39:31
December 6, 1987	Peter Maher	Canada	2:16:49	Patti Gray	United States	2:40:29
December 4, 1988	Rich McCandless	United States	2:12:44	Janis Klecker	United States	2:34:17
December 3, 1989	Budd Coates	United States	2:14:07	Nan Doak-Davis	United States	2:33:11
December 2, 1990	Peter Renner	New Zealand	2:12:35	Janis Klecker	United States	2:30:42
December 8, 1991	Bruce Deacon	Canada	2:15:16	Sally Eastall	United Kingdom	2:29:29
December 6, 1992	Steve Plasencia	United States	2:14:14	Kathleen Bowman	United States	2:34:20
December 5, 1993	Jerry Lawson	United States	2:10:27	Linda Somers	United States	2:34:11
December 4, 1994	Graeme Fell	Canada	2:16:13	Jennifer Martin	United States	2:36:19
December 3, 1995	Bruce Deacon	Canada	2:13:59	Michaela Reger	Germany	2:32:45
December 8, 1996	Patrick Muturi	Kenya	2:14:19	Rizoneide Vanderlei	Brazil	2:35:46
December 7, 1997	Abderazzak Haki	Morocco	2:16:31	Grace Chebet	Kenya	2:40:30
December 6, 1998	Abderazzak Haki	Morocco	2:15:04	Alena Vinnitskaya	Belarus	2:32:41
December 5, 1999	Joe LeMay	United States	2:13:55	Nickey Carroll	Australia	2:29:21
December 3, 2000	Elly Rono	Kenya	2:15:38	Kristin Schwartz	United States	2:38:16
December 2, 2001	Bruce Deacon	Canada	2:22:12	Irina Safarova	Russia	2:36:36
December 8, 2002	Elly Rono	Kenya	2:11:56	Tatiana Titova	Russia	2:33:13
December 7, 2003	Michał Bartoszak	Poland	2:16:21	Tatiana Titova	Russia	2:33:31
December 5, 2004	Oleg Bolkhovets	Russia	2:13:22	Lyudmyla Pushkina	Ukraine	2:37:22
December 4, 2005	Sergey Fedotov	Russia	2:18:28	Yelena Orlova	Russia	2:37:38
December 3, 2006	Jonathan Ndambuki	Kenya	2:14:58	Alina Gherasim	Romania	2:34:23
December 2, 2007	Laban Moiben	Kenya	2:14:31	Wioletta Kryza	Poland	2:39:20
December 7, 2008	Halefom Abebe	Ethiopia	2:16:42	Natalia Sokolova	Russia	2:32:01
December 6, 2009	Tesfaye Bekele	Ethiopia	2:13:42	Bizunesh Deba	Ethiopia	2:32:17
December 5, 2010	Dylan Wykes	Canada	2:12:39	Bizunesh Deba	Ethiopia	2:32:13
December 4, 2011	Erick Monyenye	Kenya	2:11:50	Serkalem Biset Abrha	Ethiopia	2:33:40
December 2, 2012	Daniel Tapia	United States	2:16:29	Alisha Williams	United States	2:34:57
December 8, 2013	Weldon Kirui	Kenya	2:14:32	Rebecca Wade	United States	2:30:38
December 7, 2014	Jacob Chemtai	Kenya	2:11:55	Volha Mazuronak	Belarus	2:27:33
December 6, 2015	Elisha Barno	Kenya	2:12:11	Serkalem Biset Abrha	Ethiopia	2:31:51
December 4, 2016	Nelson Oyugi	Kenya	2:11:41	Sara Kiptoo	Ethiopia	2:31:20
December 3, 2017	Tim Ritchie	United States	2:11:56	Sara Hall	United States	2:28:10
December 2, 2018	Brogan Austin	United States	2:12:39	Emma Bates	United States	2:28:18
December 8, 2019	Elisha Barno	Kenya	2:13:36	Jane Kibii	Kenya	2:29:31
2020	cancelled due to coronavirus pandemic					
December 5, 2021	Brendan Gregg	United States	2:11:21	Sara Vaughn	United States	2:26:53
December 4, 2022	Futsum Zienasellassie	United States	2:11:01	Paige Stoner	United States	2:26:02
December 3, 2023	CJ Albertson	United States	2:11:09	Grace Kahura	United States	2:29:00
December 8, 2024	Tsegay Weldlibanos	Eritrea	2:07:35	Calli Hauger-Thackery	Great Britain	2:24:28
December 7, 2025	Futsum Zeinasellassie	United States	2:09:29	Molly Born	United States	2:24:09
