= Dallas Marathon =

Annual footrace held in Dallas, Texas

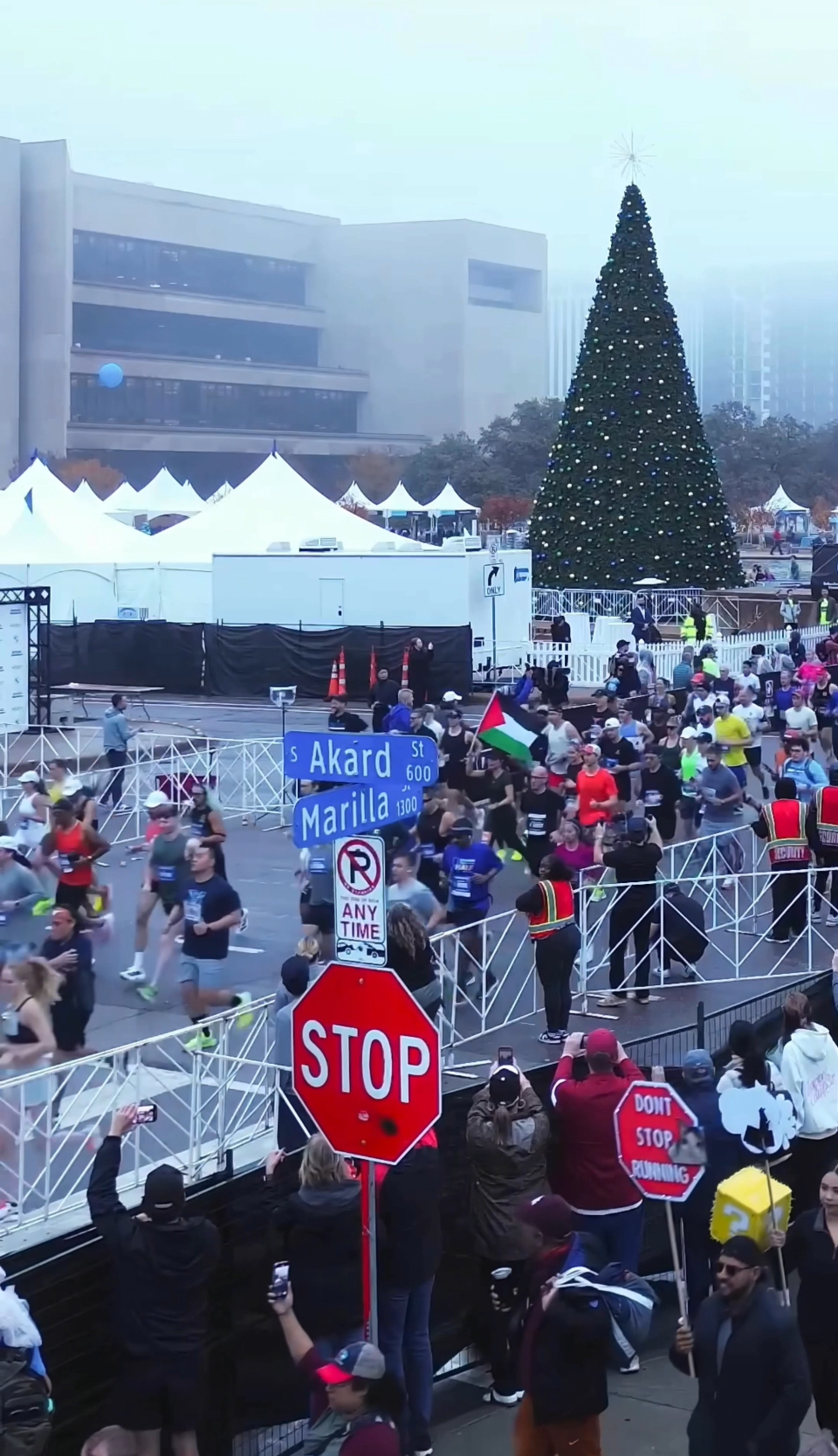
- Dallas Marathon 2024
- Date: December
- Location: Dallas, Texas
- Event type: Road
- Distance: Marathon, Half Marathon, 5-Person Relay
- Established: March 6, 1971 (55 years ago)
- Course records: Men: 2:12:04 (2006); Moses Kororia; Women: 2:29:55 (2006); Svetlana Ponomarenko
- Website: BMW Dallas Marathon

The Dallas Marathon (formerly known as the Dallas White Rock Marathon and also known as the BMW Dallas Marathon for sponsorship reasons) is an annual marathon road running event usually hosted in December by Dallas, Texas, and is Texas' oldest marathon, having been held every year since 1971 (with the exception of 2013 (Note: Due to an ice storm known locally to Dallas and Fort Worth citizens as "Icepocalypse 2013".) and 2020 (Note: Due to the coronavirus pandemic.)). The marathon begins and ends in Downtown Dallas and runs around White Rock Lake. The race weekend also includes a 5K, (Note: The race was formerly known as "Cigna Mayor's Race 5K Presented by Oncor", which The Dallas Morning News found "awkwardly named". The 5K is no longer named.) a 10K, a half marathon, a 2-person half marathon relay, a 5-person full marathon relay, and a 50K ultramarathon.

Dallas Marathon results can be used to qualify for the Boston Marathon.

Since naming a primary beneficiary in 1997, the Dallas Marathon has donated more than $3.8 million to Texas Scottish Rite Hospital for Children.

== History ==
Inspired by the American National Marathon in Galveston, Texas, Talmage Morrison, president of the Cross Country Club of Dallas, organized the inaugural "White Rock Marathon" on March 6, 1971. Looping around White Rock Lake twice, the marathon had 82 participants and 61 finishers.

In 1976, the race was moved from spring to the first Saturday in December because the new date historically offered good marathon-running weather. As a result, the White Rock Lake Marathon was held twice that calendar year: once in February and once in December.

The Dallas Marathon had been the first leg of the Marathons of Texas, a series of winter marathons held approximately one month apart from each other from December through February in Texas, along with the Houston Marathon and the Austin Marathon.

In 2013, the race was cancelled the Friday before due to ice, with no refunds offered.

In 2016, BMW signed on to become the title partner changing the official event name to the BMW Dallas Marathon.

The 2020 race was cancelled & deferred to the weekend of May 2, 2021 due to the coronavirus pandemic. Entrants that year were given either refunds or deferred automatic entry to next year's.

In December 2023, over 30,000 runners participated in events, with the proceeds going to benefit the Texas Scottish Rite Hospital for Children.

== Course ==
External images
- Course map of full marathon in 2004
- Course map of full marathon in 2019

=== Initial course ===
The first course ran around White Rock Lake twice, for 11.1 mi (17.9 km) each loop, and then went out 2 mi (3.2 km) and back. This course was used from 1971 to 1973, when part of the road situated west of the lake was torn up four days after the marathon for capital improvement purposes.

=== Three-loop course ===
The course was changed for the 1974 marathon to use a flat three-loop course situated on the eastern side of the lake. This course was used for a few years.

=== Current course ===
The current marathon course begins and ends at Dallas City Hall, and loops around White Rock Lake once.

The half marathon course does not include the loop around the lake, while the 50K ultramarathon also includes an out-and-back leg on Santa Fe Trail.

== Winners ==
Key: Course record (in bold)

Ed.	Date	Male winner	Time	Female winner	Time	Rf.
1	1971.03.06	Rick Richardson (USA)	2:38:09.4	Annabelle Corboy (USA)	4:12:25	
2	1972.03.04	Paul Hoffman (CAN)	2:23:18	Terry Lea Samuelson Stransky (USA)	3:49:29	
3	1973.03.03	Wayne Comer (USA)	2:37:45	Patti Price (USA)	4:27:45	
4	1974.02.24	Terry Ziegler (USA)	2:19:18	Kathy Loper (USA)	3:13:48	
5	1975.02.22	Terry Ziegler (USA)	2:26:07	Kathy Loper (USA)	3:00:54	
6	1976.02.21	Don Kennedy (USA)	2:25:59	Dorothy Doolittle (USA)	2:53:43	
7	1976.12.04	Jeff Wells (USA)	2:15:11	Jean Ohly (USA)	3:07:26	
8	1977.12.03	John Lodwick (USA)	2:16:43	Marianne Pugh (USA)	2:56:55	
9	1978.12.02	Tom Marino (USA)	2:18:55	Karen Cramond (USA)	2:48:36	
10	1979.12.01	Kyle Heffner (USA)	2:14:30	Toni Bernhard (USA)	2:47:31	
11	1980.12.06	Robert Wallace (AUS)	2:15:19	Martha Sartain (USA)	2:41:14	
12	1981.12.05	David Milley (USA)	2:16:13	Julie Brown (USA)	2:33:39	
13	1982.12.04	John Lodwick (USA)	2:12:18.0	Carol Urish (USA)	2:47:21.2	
14	1983.12.04	Kyle Heffner (USA)	2:13:48	Sue Moen (USA)	2:49:54	
15	1984.12.02	Bruce McKay (CAN)	2:20:20	Karen Lee Miller (USA)	2:58:04	
16	1985.12.08	Ed Swiatocha (USA)	2:17:42	Carol Beck (USA)	2:49:42	
17	1986.12.14	Ed Swiatocha (USA)	2:22:40	Hope Fullwood (USA)	2:55:37	
18	1987.12.06	Mike Moloto (RSA)	2:22:42	Charlene Soby (USA)	2:55:45	
19	1988.12.04	Andrés Espinosa (MEX)	2:16:13	Martha Ashley (USA)	2:46:30	
20	1989.12.03	Andrés Espinosa (MEX)	2:16:19	Lisa Presedo (CAN)	2:41:47	
21	1990.12.02	Jose Peña (MEX)	2:24:52	Jeni Peters (USA)	2:48:04	
22	1991.12.01	Jim Sterling (USA)	2:25:53	Peggy Murphy (USA)	2:46:38	
23	1992.12.06	J.P. Worcester (USA)	2:21:09	Mary Level (USA)	2:48:59	
24	1993.12.05	Victor deJesus (MEX)	2:17:23	Sonya Betancourt (MEX)	2:39:23	
25	1994.12.04	Juan Carlos Chavez (MEX)	2:19:42	Roxi Erickson (USA)	2:43:28	
26	1995.12.10	Victor deJesus (MEX)	2:16:03	Alevtina Naumova (RUS)	2:39:49	
27	1996.12.08	Gregorio Romo (MEX)	2:30:57	Shannon Compton (USA)	2:58:34	
28	1997.12.07	Emilio Gonzalez (MEX)	2:26:06	Ena MacPherson (CAN)	3:07:21	
29	1998.12.13	William Moore (USA)	2:20:37	Sheila Carmody (USA)	3:04:34	
30	1999.12.05	Wayne Strohman (USA)	2:24:08	Lori Stitch (USA)	2:54:44	
31	2000.12.10	Joel Ibarra (MEX)	2:26:27	Riva Rahl (USA)	2:54:20	
32	2001.12.09	Joel Ibarra (USA)	2:27:23	Dana Bullard (USA)	2:59:01	
33	2002.12.15	Ernie Caballero (USA)	2:33:13	Claudia Olivares (MEX)	3:02:41	
34	2003.12.14	Nephat Kinyanjui Ngotho (KEN)	2:16:27	Lioudmila Kortchaguina (RUS)	2:37:06	
35	2004.12.12	Elly Rono Kiplomo (KEN)	2:14:01	Liza Hunter (NZL)	2:38:24	
36	2005.12.11	Pavel Andreyev (RUS)	2:15:24	Lioudmila Kortchaguina (CAN)	2:30:03	
37	2006.12.10	Moses Kororia (KEN)	**2:12:04**	Svetlana Ponomarenko (RUS)	**2:29:55**	
38	2007.12.09	James Koskei Kimutai (KEN)	2:15:09	Emily Samoei Chepkemoi (KEN)	2:35:25	
39	2008.12.14	Henry Serem (KEN)	2:22:07	Svetlana Ponomarenko (RUS)	2:37:14	
40	2009.12.13	Edward Tabut Kiptum (KEN)	2:16:53	Rose Chebet (KEN)	2:48:21	
41	2010.12.05	James Kirwa (KEN)	2:18:37	Camille Herron (USA)	2:42:32	
42	2011.12.04	John Itati Thuo (KEN)	2:17:21	Natalya Sergeyeva (RUS)	2:35:19	
43	2012.12.09	Vladimir Safronov (RUS)	2:19:38	Nastassia Padalinskaya (BLR)	2:43:55	
—	2013	cancelled due to ice				
44	2014.12.14	Jonathan Cheruiyot Kimutai (KEN)	2:17:11	Shitaye Gemechu Debelu (ETH)	2:46:46	
45	2015.12.13	Logan Sherman (USA)	2:27:28	Jamie Vest (USA)	2:58:31	
46	2016.12.11	Keith Pierce (USA)	2:29:28	Jordan Snyder (USA)	2:59:17	
47	2017.12.10	Keith Pierce (USA)	2:27:16	Chandler Self (USA)	2:53:57	
48	2018.12.09	Colby Mehman (USA)	2:22:40	Anna Corrigan (USA)	2:50:30	
49	2019.12.15	Aaron Sherf (USA)	2:31:21	Lexie Greitzer (USA)	2:56:37	
—	2020	postponed due to coronavirus pandemic				
50	2021.12.12	Joseph Hale (USA)	2:28:42	Solyenetzitl Castro Aguilar (MEX)	2:52:20	
51	2022.12.11	Cameron Beckett (USA)	2:27:01	Megan Taylor (USA)	2:45:54	
52	2023.12.10	Joseph Hale (USA)	2:24:53	Jillian Wolf (USA)	2:51:47	
53	2024.12.15	Travis Dowd (USA)	2:26:08	Erin Woodward (USA)	2:46:51	

== Name history ==
- 2016: BMW Dallas Marathon
- 2015: Dallas Marathon
- 2014: MetroPCS Dallas Marathon
- 2013: Cancelled due to inclement weather conditions
- 2012: MetroPCS Dallas Marathon
- 2010: MetroPCS Dallas White Rock Marathon
- 2009: MetroPCS Dallas White Rock Marathon, presented by NexBank
- 2008: Dallas White Rock Marathon presented by NexBank
- 2007: Wellstone's Dallas White Rock Marathon
- 2006: Wellstone's Dallas White Rock Marathon
- 2005: White Rock Marathon

== Deaths ==
In 1986, Edwin Brown collapsed after mile 10. He was taken to Doctors Hospital and pronounced dead. He was 47.

On December 14, 2008, Erin Lahr collapsed and died during the race. She was 29.

== See also ==
- White Rock Lake
- List of marathon fatalities
