= Svetlana Ponomarenko =

Russian long-distance runner

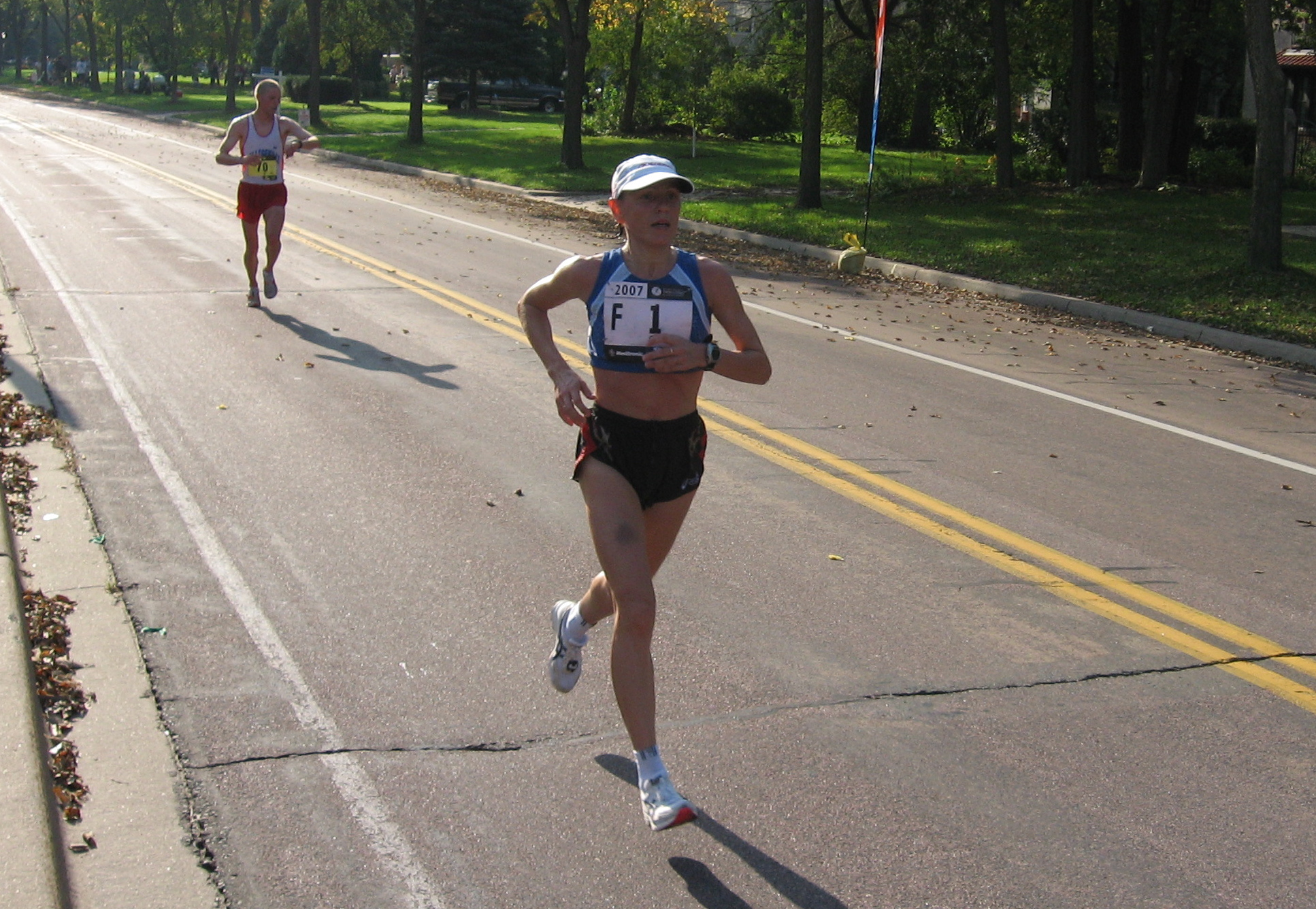
Ponomarenko leading at the 2007 Twin Cities Marathon

Svetlana Ponomarenko (Russian: Светлана Пономаренко; born 28 November 1969) is a Russian long-distance runner who competes professionally in marathon races. She has a best of 2:29:55 hours for the distance. She won six consecutive marathons—going unbeaten from 2006 to 2008—winning in Frankfurt, Dallas (twice), Minneapolis, Nashville and Athens, Greece.

== Career ==
Born in Orenburg, Soviet Union, she began running marathons in 1998, when she finished second to Alina Ivanova in the Siberian International Marathon in Omsk. Ponomarenko was third at the Stockholm Marathon in June and was fourth at the Cesano Boscone Marathon in Italy that October. She began taking part in major European competitions soon after, coming sixth at the Millennium edition of the Rome City Marathon in 2000 and taking third place at the 2001 Athens Classic Marathon. At the 2002 Athens Marathon, she was some distance behind the winner and came sixth in just under three hours. She led for much of the 2004 Athens Marathon, but ended up in third place behind Ethiopian rivals.

Her performances were much improved in the 2005 season: she recorded a time of 2:31:26 for fifth at the Frankfurt Marathon and was also fourth at that year's Prague Marathon. She took her first race victory at the Frankfurt race the following year as a late surge saw her overtake all challengers and improve her best to 2:30:05 hours. Ponomarenko made her first appearance on the United States road circuit in December and she ran for time, completing a solo run at the Dallas White Rock Marathon to take another win and personal best by dipping under the two and a half hour mark with 2:29:55 hours. She continued her marathon win-streak into the following year with a win at the Twin Cities Marathon in hot conditions. Her fourth consecutive victory over the distance came at the Athens Marathon. Making her fourth appearance at the competition, she finished almost eight minutes ahead of the next best woman to set a race record of 2:33:19.

Ponomarenko's race at the 2008 Country Music Marathon in Nashville saw the Russian again cross the tape some distance ahead of her rivals, with runner-up Olena Shurkhno some three minutes adrift. Severe winds affected her performance at the Dallas Marathon at the end of the year but she managed to take her second career win in the city. Her streak of six wins, going undefeated for three years, came to an end at the 2009 San Antonio Rock 'n' Roll Marathon, where she was second to her younger compatriot Tatyana Pushkareva. She was again the runner-up at the Twin Cities Marathon in 2010, finishing behind Ethiopian Buzunesh Deba. She was again beaten by Deba at the 2011 Los Angeles Marathon, but her eighth place finish made the 41-year-old the top masters athlete at the event.
