= White Nights International Marathon =

Annual marathon in St. Petersburg, Russia

- Date: end of June
- Location: St. Petersburg, Russia
- Event type: Road
- Distance: Marathon, Half marathon, 5K run
- Primary sponsor: Tricolor TV
- Established: 1990
- Course records: Men's: 2:11:46 (2003) (Russia) Nikolay Kerimov; Women's: 2:35:35 (2012) (Russia) Vera Trubnikova
- Website: Official website

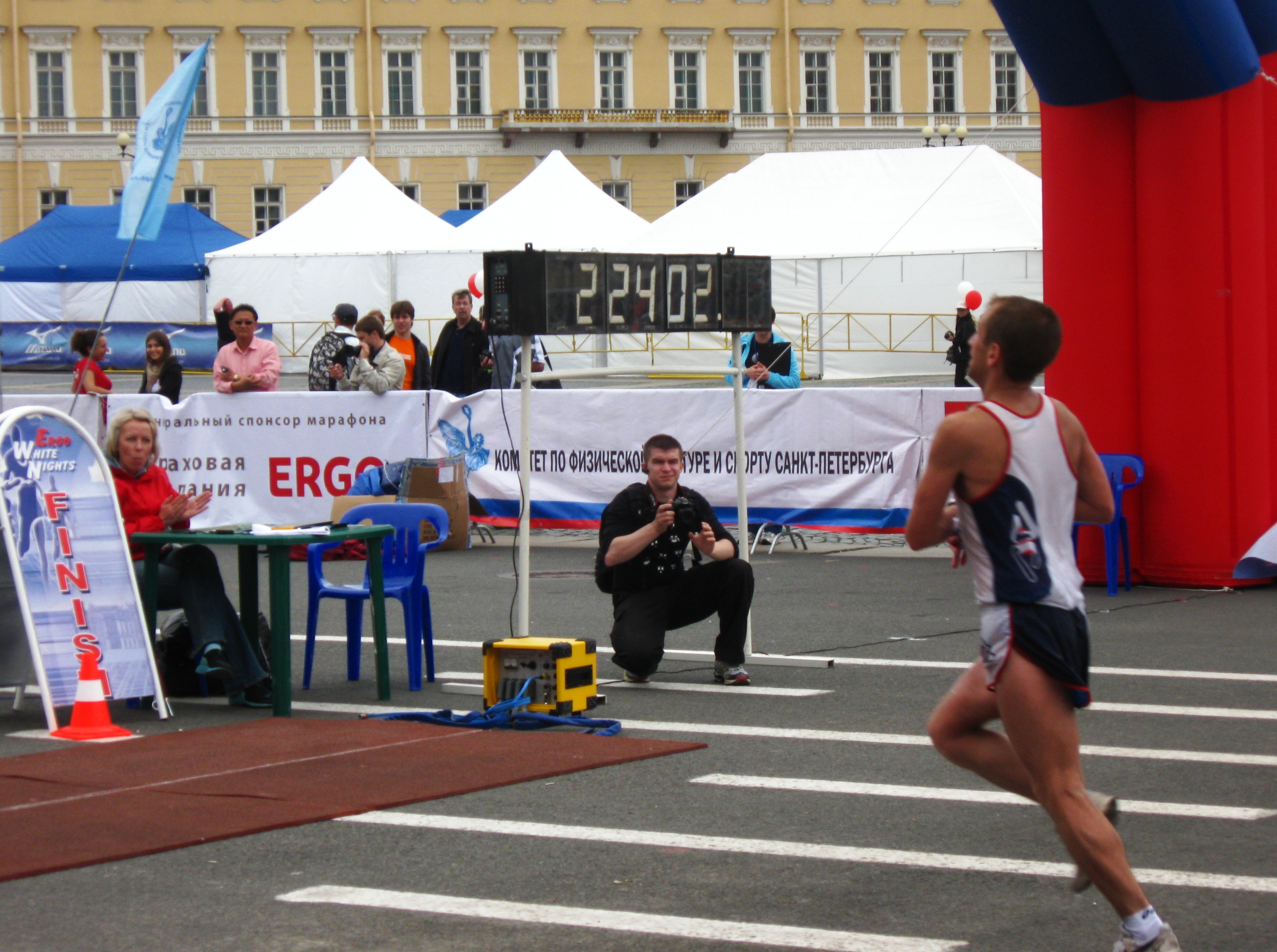
Oleg Knyagin (Kirov) finishes the 2011 White Nights Marathon

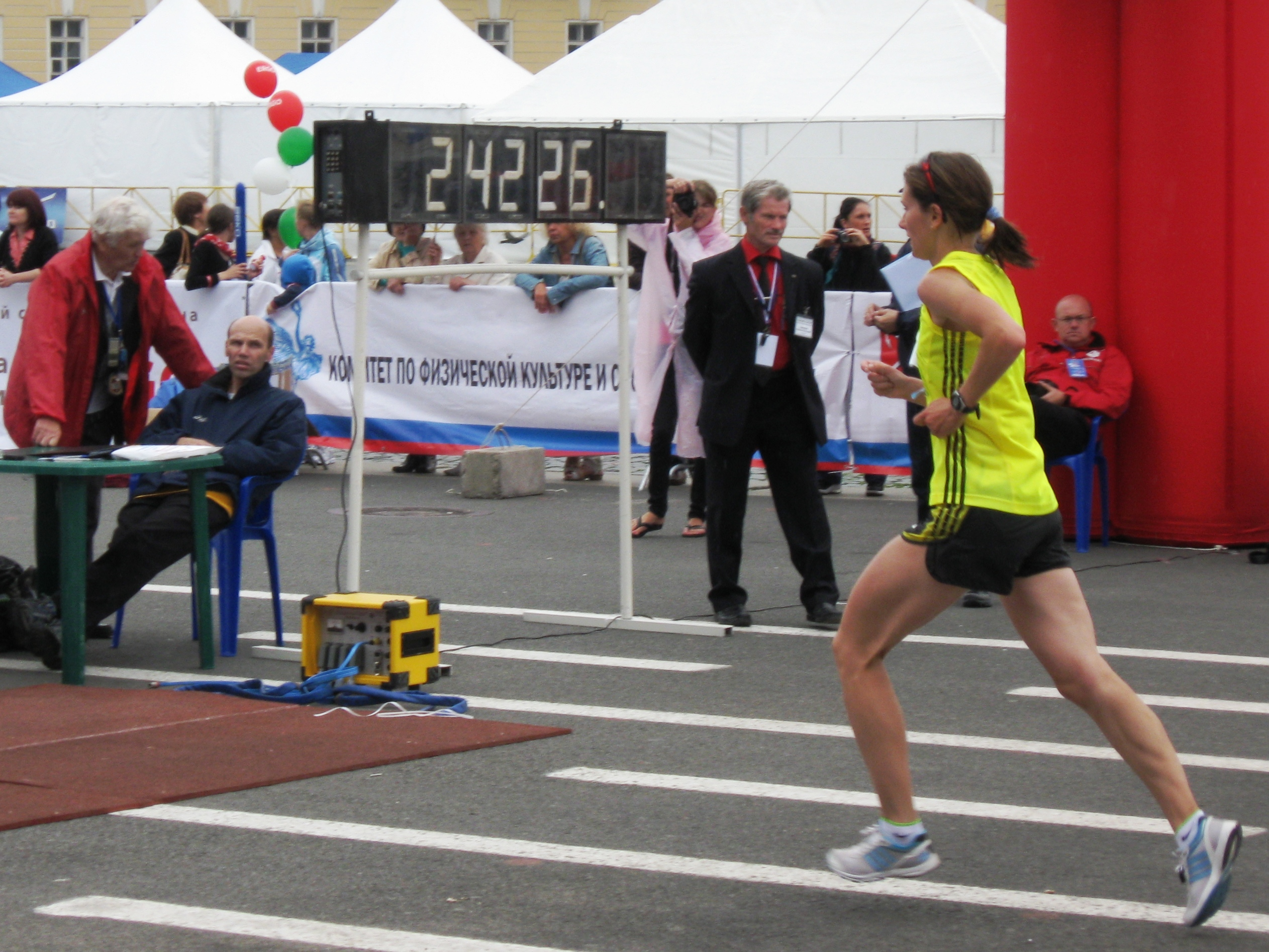
Vera Trubnikova (Novosibirsk) finishes second at the 2011 White Nights Marathon

The White Nights International Marathon is an annual marathon in St. Petersburg, Russia, that takes place during the summer, when the sky is light for nearly 24 hours, though it did not take place from 2020 to 2023; it resumed in 2024. In 2013, the race was the second-largest Russian marathon race in terms of finishers (the Moscow Marathon was first, the Siberian Marathon was third). The race has been a member of the Association of International Marathons and Distance Races. The race weekend consists of a 10K run and the marathon. Many participants have noted the laissez faire attitude about the race management, saying that it gives the event "the same kind of rawness of spirit that old-style marathons had." The race has also been known for lack of crowd support, minimal course administration, and salted rye bread instead of gels at water stations.

== Course ==
The marathon track has commonly been in one loop through the central part of the city, down streets such as Nevsky Prospect, and against the background of monuments and buildings including St. Isaac's Cathedral, The Bronze Horseman, Vasilyevsky Island's Arrow, the Peter and Paul Fortress, the Saint Petersburg Botanical Garden, the Tovstonogov Bolshoi Drama Theater, the Saint Alexander Nevsky Monastery, and others.

== Prizes ==
The winner of the marathon in 2013 earned 200,000 rubles.

== History ==
The White Nights Marathon was first held in 1990 during the White Nights Festival in Leningrad, Russia. Initially, the marathon was conceived as a night marathon—the runners started at 11 p.m. and finished the following morning.

In recent years though, the race has started at 8 a.m. Sunday morning.

No race has been held since 2020. It returns come 2024.

=== 2007 ===
The XVIII edition of the race saw 1,300 runners start the marathon. Pavel Andreyev won for the men in 2:16:26, after running ahead of contenders Aleksy Veselov and Vladimir Ponomaryov. For the women, Yulia Gromova (a local runner) set a new course record with her win in 2:37:57.

=== 2008 ===
The XIV edition of the race saw the men's race end in a tie. Pavel Andreyev crossed the finish hand-in-hand with Andrey Bryzgalov in 2:17:24. For the women, Natalia Sokolova won in 2:37:26.

=== 2011 ===
The XXII edition took place June 26, 2011. In the marathon, 977 people finished; in the 10K run, 830 people finished. Athletes from Morocco who lived and trained in Spain won the first two places in the marathon. Abdulah Tagraft won in 2:14:12, Hasan Ahagur took second (2:14:15) in a close finish. Russian marathon runner Sergey Lukin from Toksovo finished third (2:16:48).

For the woman's marathon, Alevtina Ivanova from Yoshkar-Ola won in 2:38:26.

=== 2012 ===
The XXIII White Nights International took place on July 1, 2012. The marathon race also served as the Russian Cup race. The race grew to 1,170 finishers while 987 finished the 10K. The winners of the marathon in 2012 were the runners-up from the past year: Hasan Ahagur for men, Vera Trubnikova for women. In addition, Vera Trubnikova set a course record in 2:35:35.

=== 2013 ===
The XXIV version took place on June 30, 2013. This year, the marathon was sponsored by Ergo for the first time. Even more runners (1,400) from 40 countries came to St. Petersburg to start the marathon. The 10K participation grew to 1,607 finishers Kenyan Peter Kwalir took first in the marathon (2:14:30) for men, Russian Tatyana Belkina won for the women (2:44:56).

In the 10K, athletes from St. Petersburg took first: Artur Burtsev for men in 31:02 and Yulia Chizhenko for women in 33:53.

=== 2014 ===
The XXV version took place June 29, 2014. Nearly 5,000 participants took part in the race weekend starting at the Palace Square. The marathon saw 2,184 finishers (1,845 men and 339 women). The 10K grew again, this year to 2,531 participants. The marathon was won by Salomon Kibet Barnetuni of Kenya in 2:16:12. Tatyana Belkina of Yekaterinburg won for women in 2:40:49. In the 10K, the last year's winners repeated: Artur Burtsev for men in 30:27 and Yulia Chizhenko for women in 34:29.

=== 2015 ===
On June 28, more than 11,000 people from 54 countries took part in the XXVI marathon weekend. The winner of the marathon was Mikhail Bykov in 2:20:32. The winner of the 10K was again Artur Burtsev with a time of 30:24.

=== 2016 ===
In 2016, about 4,000 athletes started at the marathon; 6,000 started the 10K. The winners of the marathon were athletes from the Samara region Yuri Mikhailovich Chechun and Nadezhda Leshchinskaya, who, despite the abnormal heat, showed fast times (2:20:27 and 2:39:57, respectively).

== Marathon race results ==
NOTE: no race in 2022-23 caused by Russian invasion of Ukraine.

Key: Course record

Men			Women		
Year	Name	Time	Year	Name	Time
2024	(Kenya) Sammy Korir	2:15:33	2024	Alena Tatarinova	2:32:46
2021	Race cancelled due to COVID-19 pandemic		2021	Race cancelled due to COVID-19 pandemic	
2020	Race cancelled due to COVID-19 pandemic		2020	Race cancelled due to COVID-19 pandemic	
2019	Yuri Chechun	2:18:41	2019	Maria Osokina	2:34:11
2018	Oleg Grigoryev	2:19:28	2018	Elizabeth Erokhina	2:40:31
2017	Yuri Chechun	2:16:07	2017	Nadezhda Leshchinskaya	2:36:50
