= Sherwood, Oregon =

- City
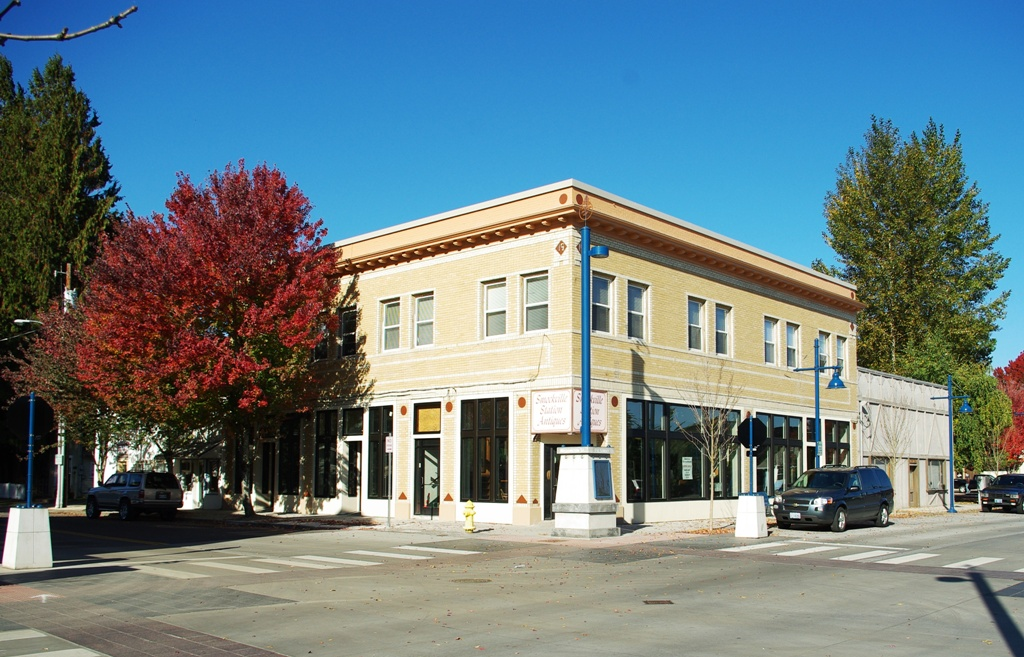
- Building in downtown Sherwood
- Nickname: Smockville
- Motto: Home of the Tualatin River National Wildlife Refuge
- Location in Oregon
- Coordinates: 45°21′35″N 122°50′30″W
- Country: United States
- State: Oregon
- County: Washington
- Incorporated: 1893

Government
  - Type: Council-manager
  - Mayor: Tim Rosener

Area
  - Total: 4.89 sq mi (12.67 km^{2})
  - Land: 4.89 sq mi (12.67 km^{2})
  - Water: 0 sq mi (0.00 km^{2})
- Elevation: 207 ft (63 m)

Population (2020)
  - Total: 20,450
  - Estimate (2022): 20,030
  - Density: 4,179.0/sq mi (1,613.51/km^{2})
- Time zone: UTC–8 (Pacific (PST))
  - Summer (DST): UTC–7 (PDT)
- ZIP code: 97140
- Area codes: 503, 971
- FIPS code: 41-67100
- GNIS feature ID: 2411889
- Website: sherwoodoregon.gov

Sherwood is a city in Washington County, Oregon, United States. Located in the southeast corner of the county, it is a residential community in the Tualatin Valley, southwest of Portland. The population was 20,450 at the 2020 census.

Sherwood was first incorporated in 1893 as a town. Originally named Smockville after its founder, James Christopher Smock, the town was given its current name by local businessman Robert Alexander in 1891. The name "Sherwood" may have come from Sherwood, Michigan or the Sherwood Forest in England.

== History ==
The name "Sherwood" came either after Sherwood Forest in England or Sherwood, Michigan In 1885, the Smocks gave a right-of-way on their property to the Portland and Willamette Valley Railway. The Smocks platted the town in 1889, the same year rail service began. Tradition has it that no one, not even the town's founders, liked the name "Smock Ville," and so a public meeting was held to rename the town. Robert Alexander, who was both a local resident and prominent businessman, suggested the name "Sherwood." According to post office records, Alexander was from Sherwood, Michigan, and also said the forest which surrounded the city was like Sherwood Forest in England. The U.S. Postal Department began sending mail to the Town of Sherwood, Oregon, on July 5, 1891. Smock was the first postmaster. The Town of Sherwood was incorporated under Oregon Senate Bill 36 in 1893.

The main industry in the 1890s was a pressed brick yard which closed in 1896, a victim of the financial recession of 1893. The Klondike Gold Rush of 1897 revived Sherwood's economy. In 2014, Money ranked Sherwood fifth among the top fifty best places to live in the United States.

The population of the city in 1911 was 350 within a 1-square-mile (2.6 km^{2}) city limit. The city has since expanded to nearly 4.5 square miles (12 km^{2}).

== Geography ==
According to the United States Census Bureau, the city has a total area of 4.31 square miles (11.16 km^{2}), all land.

== Demographics ==
Historical population
Census	Pop.	Note	%±
1900	111		—
1910	115		3.6%
1920	320		178.3%
1930	382		19.4%
1940	447		17.0%
1950	575		28.6%
1960	680		18.3%
1970	1,396		105.3%
1980	2,386		70.9%
1990	3,093		29.6%
2000	11,791		281.2%
2010	18,194		54.3%
2020	20,450		12.4%
2022 (est.)	20,030		−2.1%
U.S. Decennial Census; 2020 Census

=== 2020 census ===
As of the 2020 census, Sherwood had a population of 20,450. The median age was 37.0 years. 29.1% of residents were under the age of 18 and 10.4% of residents were 65 years of age or older. For every 100 females there were 96.5 males, and for every 100 females age 18 and over there were 90.5 males age 18 and over.

100.0% of residents lived in urban areas, while 0% lived in rural areas.

There were 6,893 households in Sherwood, of which 46.0% had children under the age of 18 living in them. Of all households, 63.2% were married-couple households, 10.7% were households with a male householder and no spouse or partner present, and 20.9% were households with a female householder and no spouse or partner present. About 16.7% of all households were made up of individuals and 7.6% had someone living alone who was 65 years of age or older.

There were 7,132 housing units, of which 3.4% were vacant. Among occupied housing units, 75.2% were owner-occupied and 24.8% were renter-occupied. The homeowner vacancy rate was 0.5% and the rental vacancy rate was 7.7%.

Racial composition as of the 2020 census
Race	Number	Percent
White	16,334	79.9%
Black or African American	141	0.7%
American Indian and Alaska Native	171	0.8%
Asian	974	4.8%
Native Hawaiian and Other Pacific Islander	88	0.4%
Some other race	659	3.2%
Two or more races	2,083	10.2%
Hispanic or Latino (of any race)	2,014	9.8%

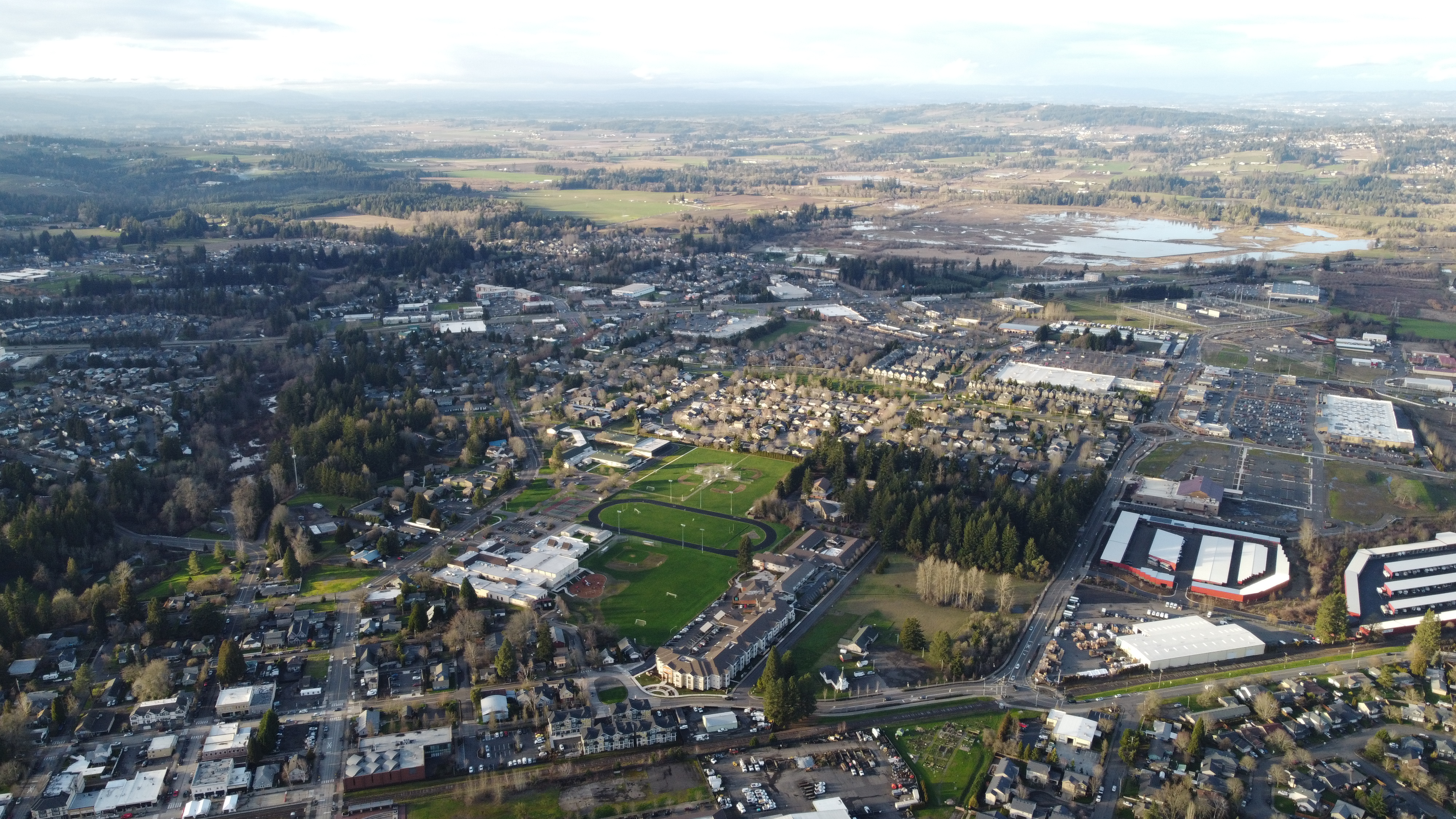
Sherwood from above

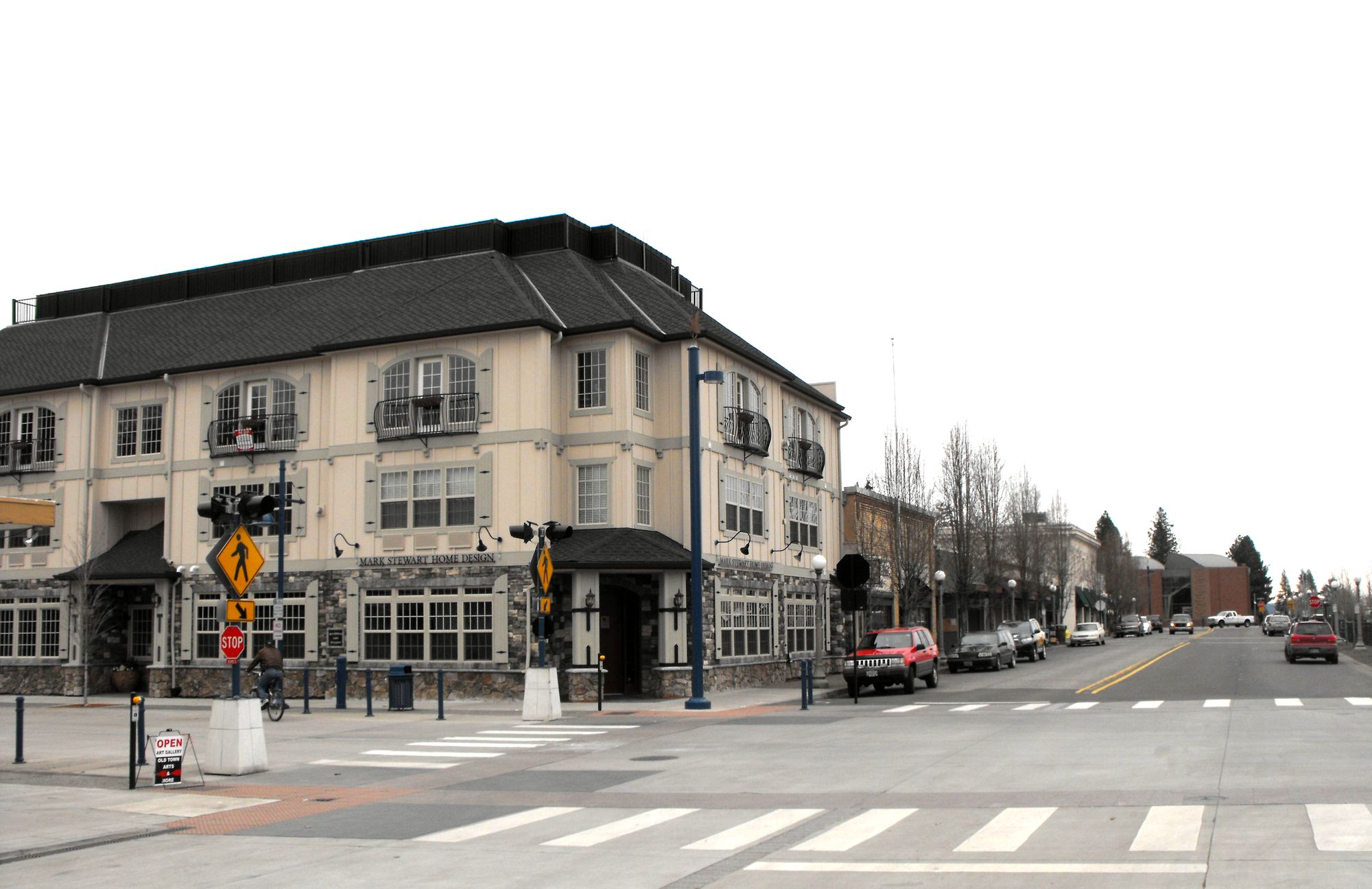
Sherwood downtown

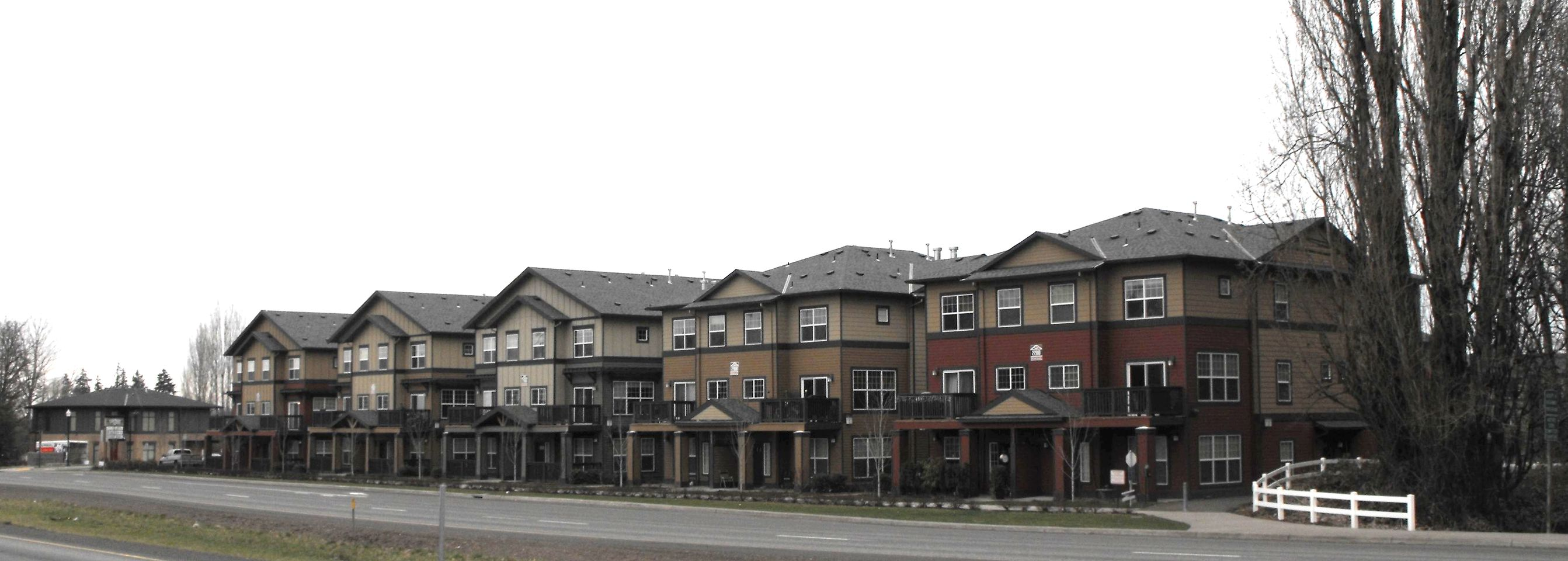
Modern houses along 99 West

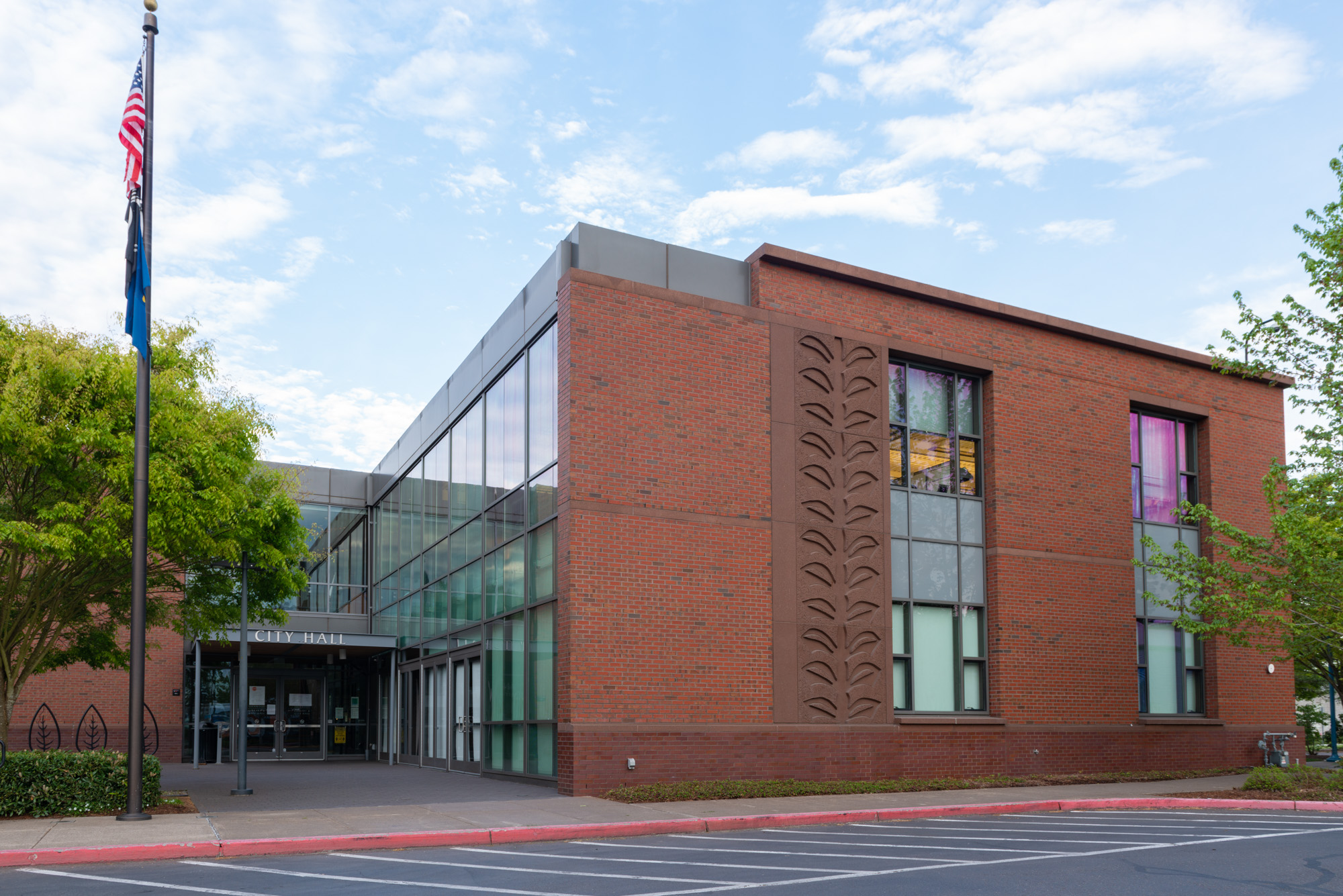
Sherwood City Hall

=== 2010 census ===
As of the 2010 census, there were 18,194 people, 6,316 households, and 4,857 families living in the city. The population density was 4,221.3 inhabitants per square mile (1,629.9/km^{2}). There were 6,569 housing units at an average density of 1,524.1 per square mile (588.5/km^{2}). The racial makeup of the city was 88.5% White, 0.8% African American, 0.5% Native American, 3.5% Asian, 0.3% Pacific Islander, 2.7% from other races, and 3.7% from two or more races. Hispanic or Latino of any race were 7.0% of the population.

There were 6,316 households, of which 49.6% had children under the age of 18 living with them, 63.5% were married couples living together, 9.7% had a female householder with no husband present, 3.6% had a male householder with no wife present, and 23.1% were non-families. 19.0% of all households were made up of individuals, and 6.7% had someone living alone who was 65 years of age or older. The average household size was 2.88 and the average family size was 3.31.

The median age in the city was 34.3 years. 33.6% of residents were under the age of 18; 5% were between the ages of 18 and 24; 32.9% were from 25 to 44; 21.6% were from 45 to 64; and 6.8% were 65 years of age or older. The gender makeup of the city was 48.9% male and 51.1% female.

The median income for a household in the city was $82,579, and the median income for a family was $90,492. Males had a median income of $66,052 versus $47,013 for females. The per capita income for the city was $31,047. About 2.2% of families and 4.1% of the population were below the poverty line, including 3.8% of those under age 18 and 1.0% of those age 65 or over.

=== 2000 census ===
As of the 2000 census, there were 11,791 people, 4,253 households, and 3,300 families living in the city. The population density was 2,895.5 inhabitants per square mile (1,118.0/km^{2}). There were 4,412 housing units at an average density of 1,083.4 per square mile (418.3/km^{2}). The racial makeup of the city was 92.36% White, 0.43% African American, 0.51% Native American, 2.22% Asian, 0.04% Pacific Islander, 1.76% from other races, and 2.67% from two or more ethnicity. Hispanic or Latino of any ethnicity were 4.72% of the population.

There were 4,253 households, out of which 46.3% had children under the age of 18 living with them, 65.7% were married couples living together, 8.8% had a female householder with no husband present, and 22.4% were non-families. 17.0% of all households were made up of individuals, and 5.4% had someone living alone who was 65 years of age or older. The average household size was 2.77 and the average family size was 3.14.

In the city, the population was spread out, with 31.7% under the age of 18, 5.5% from 18 to 24, 41.2% from 25 to 44, 16.4% from 45 to 64, and 5.3% who were 65 years of age or older. The median age was 31 years. For every 100 females, there were 95.4 males. For every 100 females age 18 and over, there were 92.9 males.

The median income for a household in the city was $62,518, and the median income for a family was $67,277. Males had a median income of $47,920 versus $33,657 for females. The per capita income for the city was $25,793. About 1.5% of families and 2.7% of the population were below the poverty line, including 2.0% of those under age 18 and 11.7% of those age 65 or over.

== Arts and culture ==
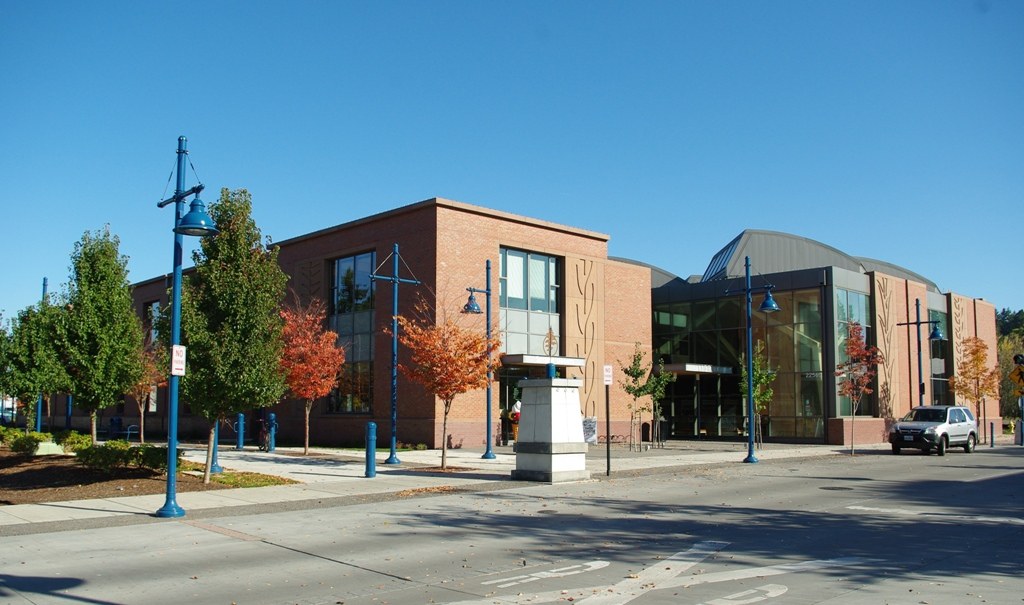
Sherwood Public Library

Sherwood Public Library is located here.

== Education ==
Sherwood School District has four elementary schools (Hawks View, Middleton, Archer Glen, Ridges), one middle school, Sherwood Middle School, and one high school, Sherwood High School. As of the 2023–2024 school year, the total enrollment was 4,659 students. There were between 323 and 666 students attending each of the four elementary schools, 1,120 at Sherwood Middle School, and 1,676 students enrolled at Sherwood High School.

== Infrastructure ==
Bus service is provided by the Tri-County Metropolitan Transportation District of Oregon, and Yamhill County Transit.

Fire protection and emergency medical services are provided through Tualatin Valley Fire and Rescue.

== Notable people ==
- Del Baker (1892–1973) — baseball player, coach, and manager with the Detroit Tigers
- Jim Benning (born 1963) — former Canadian ice hockey executive and player
- Karsen Dorwart - National Hockey League player
- Dave Edstrom (1938–2019) — decathlete, gold medal at the 1959 Pan American Games
- Rich Fellers (born 1959) — Olympic equestrian
- A.C. Gibbs (1825–1886) — American politician and the second Governor of Oregon
- Iain Harrison — competitive shooter and former British Army captain
- Glenn Olds (1921–2006) — academic administrator, government official and politician
- Jiggs Parrott, (1871–1898) — professional baseball player
- Thomas H. Parrott (1836–1899) — musician
- Tom Parrott (1868–1932) — professional baseball player
- Ilsa Paulson (born 1988) — former long-distance runner and winner of the 2009 USA Marathon Championships
- Bud Podbielan (1924–1982) —baseball player for the Cincinnati Reds
- Adley Rutschman (born 1998) — baseball catcher for the Baltimore Orioles
- Mark Smith — fantasy gamebook author
- Daniela Solís (born 1993) — Mexican-American footballer
- Chuck Sun (born 1956) former motocross racer
- Ashton Eaton (born 1988) — decathlete, gold medal at the 2012 Summer Olympics and 2016 Summer Olympics
- Brianne Theisen-Eaton (born 1988) — heptathlete, bronze medal at the 2016 Summer Olympics

== See also ==
- Tualatin River National Wildlife Refuge
