= Alevtina Ivanova =

Russian long-distance runner

Alevtina Ivanova (Russian: Алевтина Иванова) (born 22 May 1975) is a Russian long-distance runner who specialises in the marathon. She has won at the Prague International Marathon (in 2002) and the Nagano Olympic Commemorative Marathon (in 2007 and 2008). Ivanova has competed much on the road running circuit in the United States and has won the Beach to Beacon 10K, Crim 10-Mile Race, News and Sentinel Half Marathon and America's Finest City Half Marathon.

She has represented Russia internationally in cross country running: she was the best-performing European in the short race at the 2005 IAAF World Cross Country Championships and took part in the 2006 European Cross Country Championships. In addition to professional competition, she has acted as a pacemaker in major marathons in Japan.

== Career ==
She made her debut over the classic distance in 2002 at the Prague International Marathon and she won, finishing in a time of 2:32:24. She improved her time further at the Amsterdam Marathon in October, where she ran 2:30:25 for sixth place, and then she took third place at the Honolulu Marathon. The following year she took part in the Nagano Olympic Commemorative Marathon for the first time and finished in second place behind compatriot Madina Biktagirova with a personal best time of 2:29:05. She also ran in the Dublin Marathon (taking fourth) and returned to Honolulu where she improved to second place. At the Park Forest Scenic 10 in Illinois, United States, she ran a course record of 53:18 to win the 10-mile (16 km) competition.

In 2004, Ivanova ran at the Nagano Marathon for a second time, finishing fourth on this occasion. She started a tour of the United States and ran in a succession of races in August. She started with a third-place finish at the Beach to Beacon race, scored a victory in the 7-mile (11 km) Falmouth Road Race the following week, won at the America's Finest City Half Marathon the next weekend, and then beat all comers at the News and Sentinel Half Marathon in Parkersburg, West Virginia a week later. She closed the year with a fourth-place finish at the Honolulu Marathon.

She won the Russian cross country running championships at the start of 2005 and entered the short race at the 2005 IAAF World Cross Country Championships. She placed tenth in the race – the best performance by an athlete outside of the dominant teams of Kenya and Ethiopia. A return to the Beach to Beacon race saw her finish as runner-up to Lornah Kiplagat. Ivanova was eighth at the Virginia Beach Half Marathon. She was employed as the pacemaker for the 2005 Tokyo International Women's Marathon and led the race up to the 25 km point. She again ran in Honolulu and reached the podium by taking third place.

At the start of 2006, she set a course record at the Uptown Run in Dallas, Texas, winning the 8 km race in a time of 25:16. She set a number of bests from 15 km to 25 km at the Nagoya Women's Marathon, although she failed to finish the race. In her third attempt at the Beach to Beacon Race she beat Edna Kiplagat to win the title of the 10K competition. She also won the News and Sentinel Half Marathon for a second time in August 2006, and also took the title at the Crim 10-Mile Race in Flint, Michigan that month. At the end of the year she represented Russia at the 2006 European Cross Country Championships, where she was sixteenth and helped the Russia women's team to fourth place along with Mariya Konovalova. She acted as the pacemaker for the Tokyo Women's Marathon in November and she set an unofficial best of 1:10:53 over the half marathon distance.

She won the 2007 Nagano Marathon, building up a large lead in the final stages to score a personal best of 2:27:49, as well as a win over Dire Tune, among others. Ivanova competed in India for the first time at the Delhi Half Marathon and she finished in eighth place. The following year's Nagano Marathon brought even further improvement for the Russian as she not only defended her title, but knocked over a minute off her best with a run of 2:26:39.

Ivanova led the 2009 Rock 'n' Roll Las Vegas Marathon for much of the race, but she was eventually overhauled by Caroline Rotich. She managed to finish as runner-up to Helena Kirop at the 2010 Prague Marathon, running one of her fastest times with 2:27:36. She was sixth at the Yokohama Women's Marathon in her first race of 2011. She won the Saint Petersburg Marathon in June then returned to Yokohama for its new November timing, but was outside of the top ten. She returned to the podium at the San Diego Marathon in June 2012, winning the race in a time of 2:27:44 hours.

== Personal bests ==
Event	Time (h:m:s)	Venue	Date
10 km	31:26	Cape Elizabeth, Maine, United States	5 August 2006
Half marathon	1:11:08	Nagoya, Japan	12 March 2006
Marathon	2:26:38	Nagano, Japan	20 April 2008

- All information taken from IAAF profile.
