= Albina Mayorova =

Russian long-distance runner

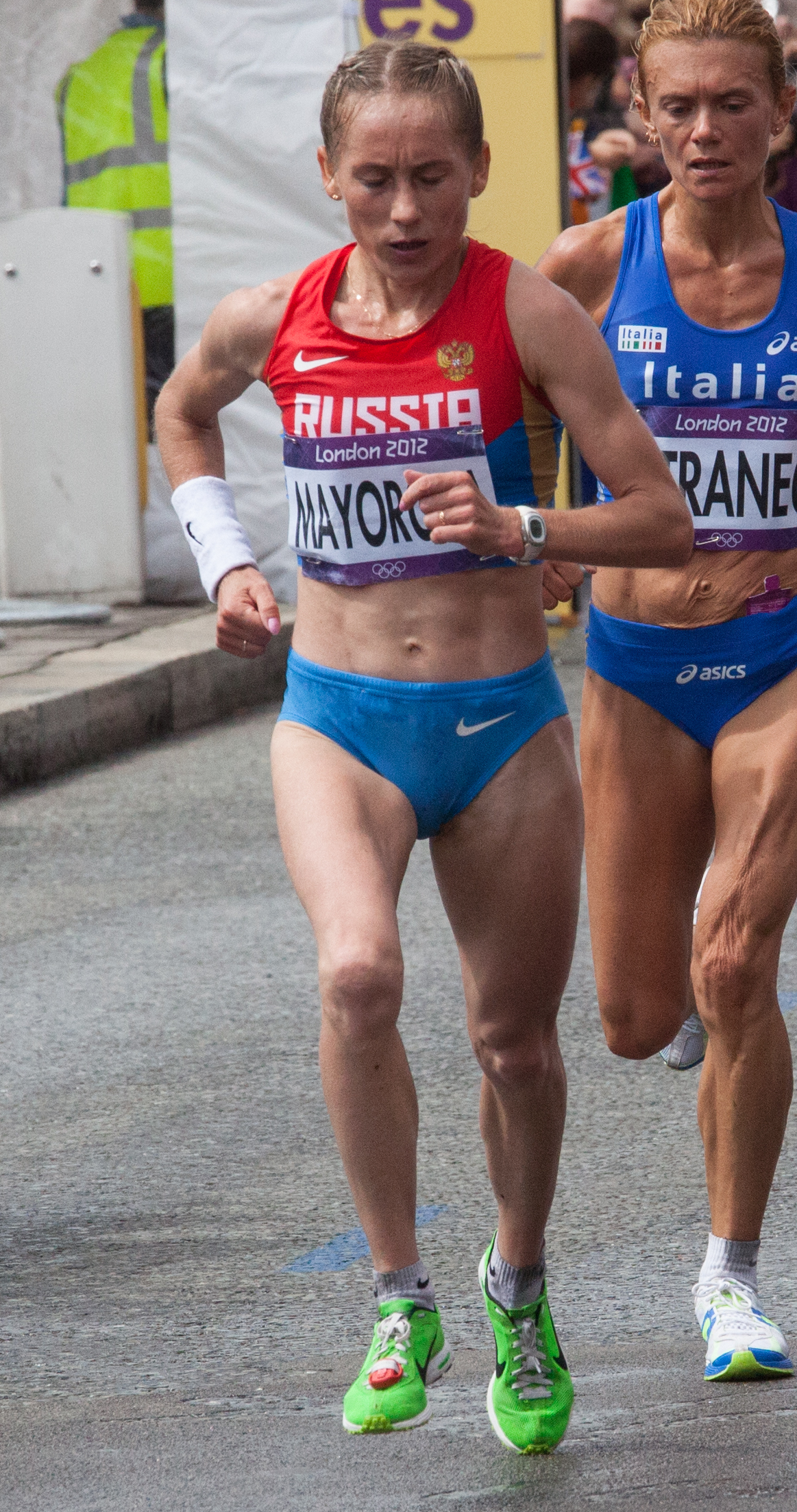
- Albina Mayorova on the London 2012 Women's Marathon

Personal information
- Born: May 16, 1977 (age 49)
- Height: 1.67 m (5 ft 5 1/2 in)
- Weight: 50 kg (110 lb)

Sport
- Country: Russia
- Sport: Athletics
- Event: Marathon

Albina Mayorova (born 16 May 1977), née Albina Gennadyevna Ivanova (Russian: Альбина Геннадьевна Иванова), is a Russian long-distance runner who competes in marathon races. She has a personal best of 2:23:52 hours for the distance. Since her marathon debut in 2001, she has won international races in Dubai, Nagano, Singapore and Nagoya. She has also had top four finishes at the Chicago, London and Honolulu Marathons.

She represented Russia in the marathon at the 2004 Summer Olympics, 2012 Summer Olympics and the 2006 European Athletics Championships. She was the 2005 Russian champion in cross country running and also competed for Russia at the 2002 IAAF World Cross Country Championships. She competed in the marathon at the 2013 World Championships in Athletics.

== Career ==
Born in the rural town of Erenary in Alikovsky District in the west of Russia, she enlisted in the Russian Army and began competing in long-distance events for Cheboksary (the regional capital). Her first major performances in the marathon came in 2001. On her debut at the Moscow Marathon she finished in third place and later that year she ran a personal best of 2:34:46 hours at the Siberian International Marathon in Omsk, taking second place behind Irina Safarova. Mayorova claimed her first victory over the distance at the Dubai Marathon in January 2002 and she improved her best time to 2:33:31 hours. Her first international appearance followed at the 2002 IAAF World Cross Country Championships in Dublin and her 28th-place finish helped the Russian women to fourth place in the short race rankings.

At the Columbus Marathon in the United States she came second and dipped under two and a half hours with her time of 2:29:58. She returned to the marathon in Omsk and had her second win of the year, before going on to improve her best by five seconds in a runner-up performance at the Honolulu Marathon. She competed principally in American races the following year: she ran a time of 2:30:57 to finish sixth at the Boston Marathon in April and won the Fifth Third River Bank Run 25K a month later. She had the best run of her career at the Chicago Marathon in October, improving her best by over four minutes to claim fourth place with her time of 2:25:35 hours. She returned to Honolulu at the end of the year and finished third on that occasion.

In 2004, she had a fourth-place finish at the London Marathon and her time of 2:27:25 led to her inclusion in the Russian Olympic marathon squad. She won the Lilac Bloomsday Run and Bay to Breakers 12K races in May that year. On her Olympic debut at the age of 27, Mayorova was some twenty minutes slower than her London outing and managed only fortieth place overall. She had better performances on the American circuit later that year, taking fifth in Chicago and third in Honolulu. She won the Russian long race national title in cross country running at the start of 2005 then won at the Nagano Olympic Commemorative Marathon that April. She finished second to Colleen De Reuck at the River Bank Run 25K, Her form dipped at the end of the year as she was eleventh in Chicago and ranked seventh at the Las Vegas Marathon.

Her 2006 season began well with a second consecutive win at the Nagano Marathon, where she recorded a season's best time of 2:28:52 hours. She was chosen for the Russian team at the 2006 European Athletics Championships, but again did not perform well in championship competition as she was 24th out of 29 finishers, although she was part of the silver medal-winning team in the European Marathon Cup. She made her fourth career appearance at the Honolulu Marathon and came fifth. She took a break from athletics from the 2007 season onwards. She married Evgeniy Mayorov, a former runner, and changed her competitive name from Albina Ivanova to Mayorova. She also had her first child. She returned to competition in 2009 and competed in three marathons that year: she was seventh on her comeback at the Rome Marathon (running a time of 2:30:21 hours), was fourth at the San Diego Marathon, and won her first race in three years at the Singapore Marathon (where she ran a quick second half of the race to record the second fastest ever time on the course).

In 2010, she ran her fastest time since 2004 with a run of 2:28:06 hours at the Toronto Marathon, but she finished seventh overall in a high calibre field. She was also tenth place at the 2010 Boston Marathon. She came sixth at the 2011 San Diego Marathon and was fifth in her first appearance at the Istanbul Marathon. Mayorova improved her seven-year-old personal best at the Nagoya Women's Marathon, taking the title with a time of 2:23:52 hours. This earned her a place at the 2012 London Olympics and she reached the top ten, finishing ninth with a time of 2:25:38 hours.

Mayorova began the next year with a fourth-place finish at the 2013 Tokyo Marathon. She was lower down the order at the 2013 World Championships in Athletics marathon, coming 21st overall in her first outing at the tournament. Her best race that year came at the Yokohama Women's Marathon, where she took victory in a time of 2:25:55.

In April 2017, she was disqualified for four years for doping use.
