= Sergey Lukin (runner) =

Russian long-distance and middle-distance runner

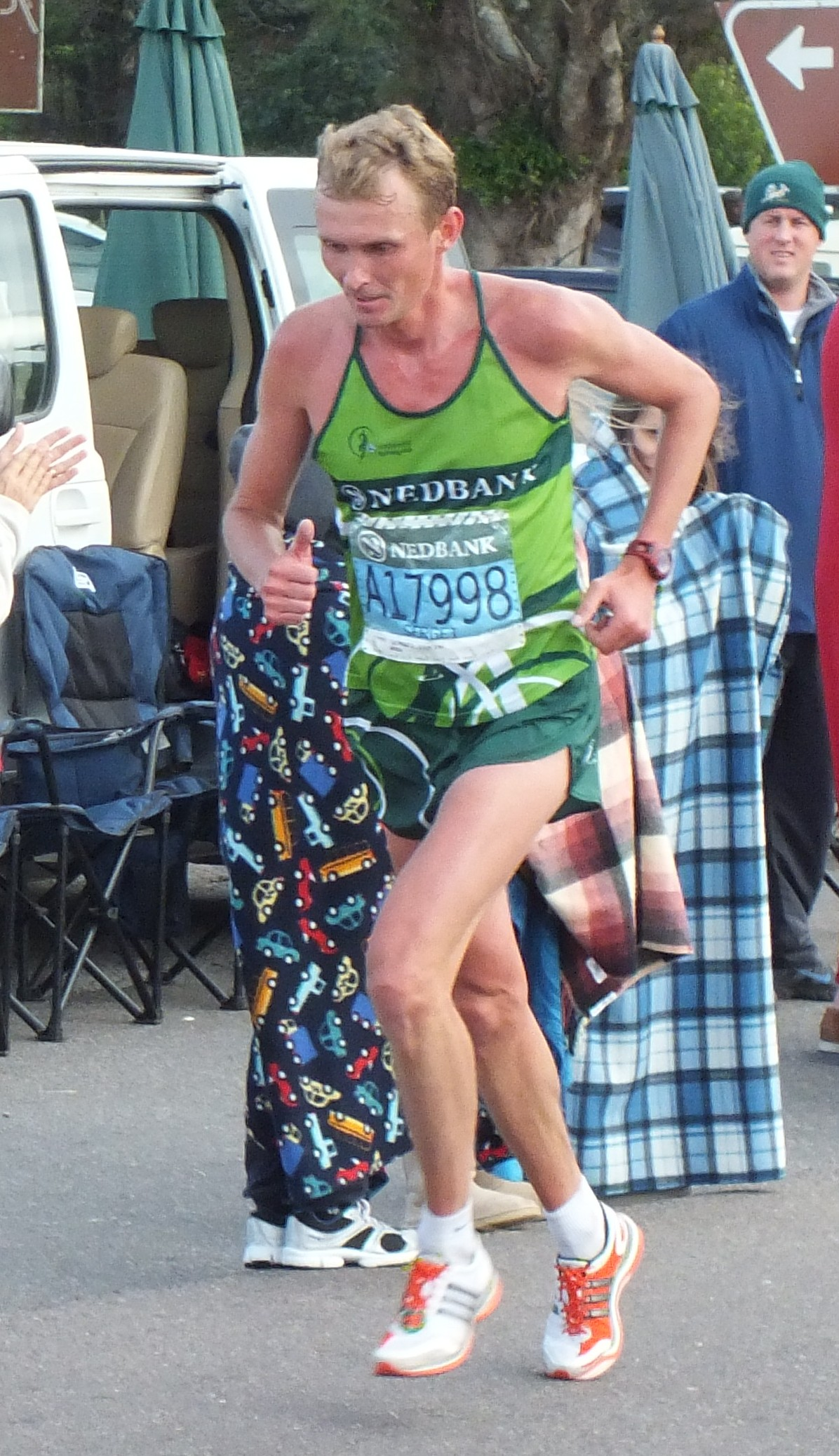
Sergei Lukin, 2012 Comrades

Sergey Lukin (Russian: Лукин Сергей; born Jan. 3, 1975, also known as Sergei Lukin), is a Russian middle-distance and long-distance runner. He achieved fame in 1999, when he became the national champion in the 5,000 meter race at the Russian National Championships. In 2009, he became the Russian National Champion in the half-marathon race at Cheboksary, Russia where he rad a 1:06:13.

Lukin is also a major marathon winner who competed for his country in the IAAF World Cross Country Championships in 2000 and in 2001. He is a three-time winner of the Siberian International Marathon (2006, 2007, 2009) in Omsk. He won the 2006 Grandma's Marathon in Minnesota and the 2008 Lisbon Marathon. He finished third at the Istanbul Marathon in 2006 when Mindaugas Pukstas set the course record. In 2011, he won the Riga Half Marathon. The next year, he finished third in the Stockholm Marathon. He has been a top finisher at the White Nights International Marathon in St. Petersburg, Russia.

Earlier, in 1997, he finished third in the 1997 European Athletics U23 5,000 meters Championship race. He also placed fifth in the 10,000 meters at the same competition. In 1998, he earned bronze again at the 1998 Russian Indoor Athletics Championships, this time in the 3,000 meter race. In 2005, he continued his cross country medal winning with a third-place showing in the Lidingöloppet. The same year, he finished sixth at the Tokyo Marathon.

Lukin won the Moscow International Half Marathon in 2003, 2004 and 2007.

== Personal life ==
Lukin was a Russian Army sergeant.
