= Highland Capital =

- Highland Capital Management, a multibillion-dollar distressed investment firm and hedge fund and mutual fund manager based in Dallas, Texas
- Highland Capital Partners, a $2.6 billion venture capital firm based in Lexington, Massachusetts
