= Nephat Kinyanjui =

Kenyan long-distance runner

Nephat Ngotho Kinyanjui (born 30 June 1977, in Miharati, Central Province) is a Kenyan long-distance runner who competes in road running events including the marathon. He is a three-time champion at the Nagano Olympic Commemorative Marathon and has also won marathons in Nashville, Dallas, and Beijing. He set his personal best of 2:08:09 hours at the latter race.

== Career ==
He was trained by two-time New York City Marathon champion John Kagwe and is a training partner with 2008 Olympic champion Samuel Wanjiru.

Kinyanjui began competing internationally in 2002, mainly in American road races. He won the Buffalo 4-Mile Chase and made his marathon debut at the Dallas White Rock Marathon, which he won in a time of 2:16:27 hours. He made his second appearance over the distance at the Country Music Marathon, setting a personal record of 2:15:52, although he was the runner-up on this occasion. He was also second at the Fairfield Half Marathon but managed only ninth at the Virginia Beach Half Marathon. Kinyanjui returned to Dallas and improved his best further to 2:14:35 hours, but was beaten to the title by half a minute by fellow Kenyan Elly Rono.

His 2005 season saw further improvements as he won the Country Music Marathon. He was top-three at the Utica Boilermaker in July and then won the America's Finest City Half Marathon in San Diego the following month. He branched out beyond his US base for the first time that year and was 13th at the Berlin Marathon, but he still ran a best time of 2:12:48 in the top-level race. He began to focus on East Asian races from 2006 onwards. In a closely contested race, he defeated Grigoriy Andreyev by one second at the Nagano Olympic Commemorative Marathon to record a personal record time of 2:11:18.

At the 2007 Nagano race the final stages proved to be a repeat of the previous year, as the Kenyan eked out the win at the line over Andreyev. He was invited to the Beijing Marathon in October and he claimed first place with a significant new best time of 2:08:09 – over three minutes faster than he had run before. He took a third consecutive title in Nagano the following year, narrowly holding off Tomohiro Seto in a four-man sprint for the line.

He ran at the 2009 Dubai Marathon, but was well back in the field with his run of 2:15:23 hours. He did not race for the following two seasons and returned at the 2012 Prague International Marathon, placing fifth.
