= Sherwood School District =

School district in the United States

Coordinates: 45°21′21.45″N 122°50′33.14″W

Sherwood School District is a small school district that serves Sherwood, Oregon, United States. The administrative offices are at 21920 SW Sherwood Blvd in Sherwood.

The district currently has four elementary schools, one middle school, and one high school. They include Archer Glen Elementary School, Hawks' View Elementary School, Middleton Elementary School, Ridges Elementary School, Sherwood Middle School, and Sherwood High School. The Sherwood Elementary School District 88J was established in about 1891, with other elementary districts later merged into the district. The high school district (9J) and elementary districts later consolidated to form a unified school district. Dr. Aaron Downs is the current district superintendent.

== Demographics ==
In the 2009 school year, the district had 35 students classified as homeless by the Department of Education, or 0.8% of students in the district.

== 2016 Capital Bond ==
The Sherwood Schools 2016 Capital Bond is a plan to generally improve various schools throughout the district, as well as construct a new High School, which will replace the existing Sherwood High School as of the 2020-21 School Year. Laurel Ridge will be converted into Two Elementary Schools (Currently Joined Middle and Elementary School). In addition, various buildings will be modified or moved to accommodate the district's increasing size.

Existing Structure		New Purpose
New High School	→	Sherwood High School
Sherwood High School	→	Sherwood Middle School & Laurel Ridge Middle School
Sherwood Middle School	→	Hawks' View Elementary School
J. Clyde Hopkins Elementary School	→	District Office
