= Rock 'n' Roll Nashville Marathon =

Annual race in the United States held since 2000

Coordinates: 36°09′55″N 86°46′24″W

- Date: April
- Location: Nashville, Tennessee
- Event type: Road
- Distance: Marathon, half marathon, and 5K
- Primary sponsor: St. Jude Children's Research Hospital
- Established: 2000 (26 years ago)
- Course records: Men: 2:12:55 (2000); Luke Kibet; Women: 2:28:06 (2003); Irina Bogacheva
- Website: Official website

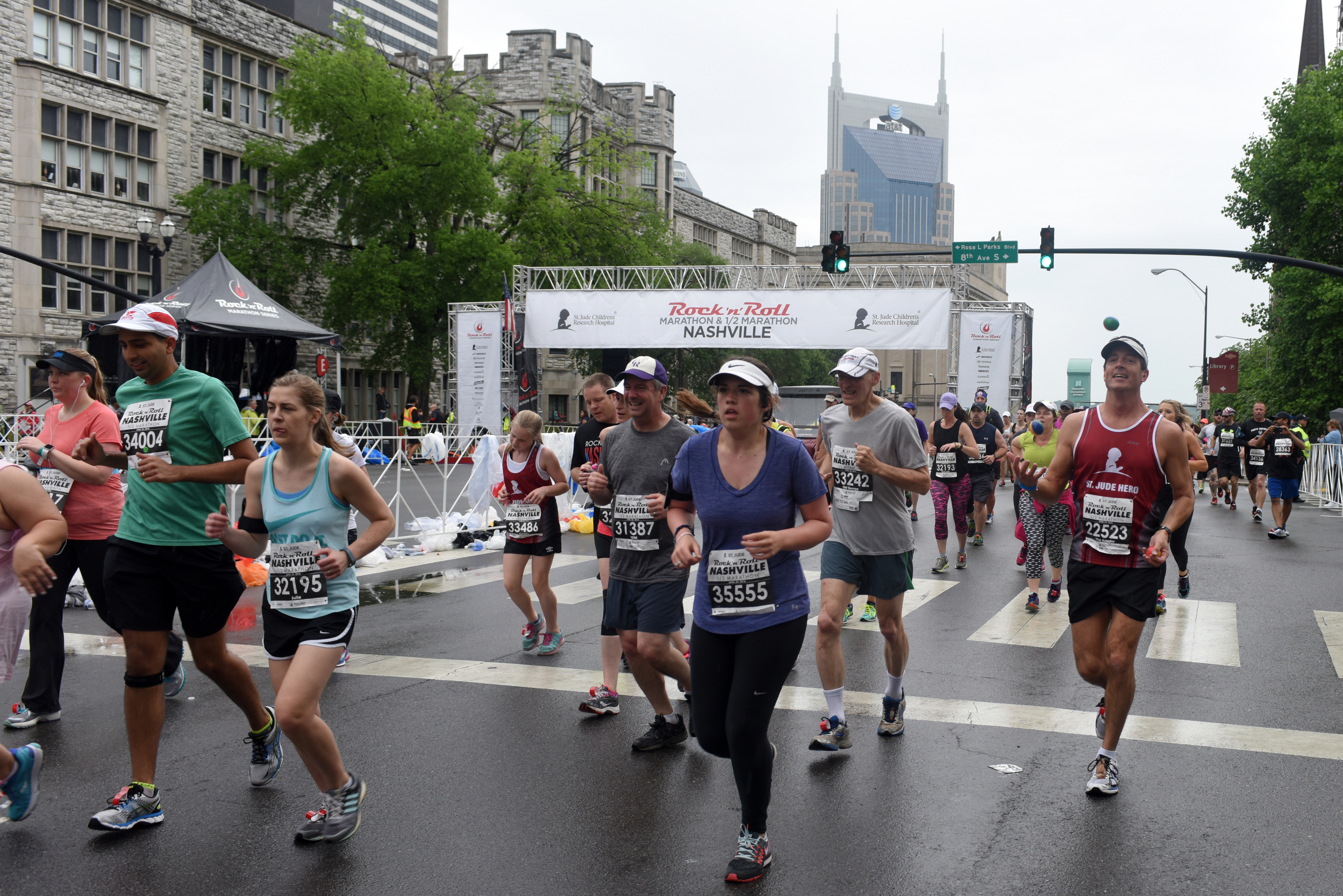
Runners in 2016

The Rock 'n' Roll Nashville Marathon, previously known as the Country Music Marathon (2000–2015), is an annual marathon, half marathon, and 5K run that has been held in Nashville, Tennessee, since 2000. The marathon is followed by an evening country music concert. (Note: The concert has previously featured artists such as Sara Evans, Phil Vassar, Jo Dee Messina, Brad Paisley, and Lee Roy Parnell.) Nashville is a major center for the music industry, especially country music, and is commonly known as "Music City"

The Rock 'n' Roll Marathon is a qualifying event for the Boston Marathon. (Note: This is in contrast with some of Nashville's other marathons, e.g. Harpeth Hills Flying Monkey Marathon and Greenway Marathon.) It is owned by Advance Publications as part of the Rock 'n' Roll Marathon Series.

== History ==
The marathon was first held in April 2000 when 3,230 men and 2,589 women completed the event.

As the event grew in popularity, a half-marathon was added in 2002. This was soon followed by the addition of a kids marathon. A 5k run was added to the race options as well as wheelchair versions of the marathon, half-marathon, and 5k races. The number of participants in the 2008 event exceeded 30,000 total entrants. Hendersonville resident Scott Wietecha won the full marathon seven consecutive years from 2013 to 2019.

The 2020 race was postponed to November 21 and later cancelled due to the coronavirus pandemic. The 2021 edition was postponed from the traditional spring date and was held on November 20. It featured a new winner after seven-time defending winner Scott Wietecha chose not to compete.

== Course ==
The route begins on Broadway and continues along many of Nashville's sights, including Bridgestone Arena, the Nashville Symphony, the Frist Center for the Visual Arts, Union Station, Music Row, Vanderbilt University, Belmont University, the Belmont Mansion, the Tennessee State Capitol, the Bicentennial Capitol Mall State Park, First Horizon Park, the Cumberland River, and Shelby Park, before ending outside Nissan Stadium.

Band stages featuring live musical entertainment are located along the course. Many bands and high school cheerleaders entertain runners and walkers, and friends, families, and neighbors join in cheering on participants.

== Winners ==
Key: (†) Course record (in bold)

Ed.	Year	Men's winner	Time	Women's winner	Time
1	2000	Luke Kibet (KEN)	**2:12:55**^{†}	Lucia Subano (KEN)	2:37:02
2	2001	Christopher Cheboiboch (KEN)	2:13:27	Aurica Buia (ROM)	2:34:40
3	2002	Jackson Chebet (KEN)	2:18:59	Aurica Buia (ROM)	2:35:58
4	2003	Jomo Kororia (KEN)	2:12:56	Irina Bogacheva (KGZ)	**2:28:06**^{†}
5	2004	Luke Kibet (KEN)	2:14:11	Anuța Cătună (ROM)	2:33:36
6	2005	Nephat Kinyanjui (KEN)	2:15:38	Irina Safarova (RUS)	2:33:53
7	2006	Feyisa Tusse (ETH)	2:15:06	Tatyana Mironova (RUS)	2:36:51
8	2007	Simon Wangai (KEN)	2:13:52	Olena Shurkhno (UKR)	2:37:52
9	2008	Sylvester Chebii (KEN)	2:14:27	Svetlana Ponomarenko (RUS)	2:30:33
10	2009	Amos Tirop Matui (KEN)	2:13:41	Tatyana Pushkareva (RUS)	2:36:44
11	2010	William Najanjo (COL)	2:15:38	Ilsa Paulson (USA)	2:33:39
12	2011	David Kellum (KEN)	2:17:40	Ruby Milena Riativa (COL)	2:49:59
13	2012	Ryan James (USA)	2:32:47	Erin Sutton (USA)	2:54:16
14	2013	Scott Wietecha (USA)	2:22:41	Jill Horst (USA)	2:57:51
15	2014	Scott Wietecha (USA)	2:25:51	Jeannette Faber (USA)	2:47:32
16	2015	Scott Wietecha (USA)	2:23:33	Melanie Kulesz (USA)	3:04:28
17	2016	Scott Wietecha (USA)	2:25:42	Melanie Kulesz (USA)	2:59:09
18	2017	Scott Wietecha (USA)	2:40:25	Lauren Mitchell (USA)	3:17:32
19	2018	Scott Wietecha (USA)	2:28:16	Stella Chrisoforou (USA)	2:53:44
20	2019	Scott Wietecha (USA)	2:34:59	Anna Bailey (USA)	2:51:49
–	2020	Cancelled due to COVID-19 pandemic			
21	2021	Will Cadwell (USA)	2:26:34	Gisela Olalde (USA)	2:46:10
22	2022	Ryan Martin (USA)	2:41:25	Sidney Hirsch (USA)	2:59:57
23	2023	Garang Madut (USA)	2:27:06	Sarah Higgens (USA)	2:43.54
24	2024	Mitchell Small (USA)	2:27:33	Kate van Buskirk (CAN)	2:37:40
25	2025	David Gregory (USA)	2:32:06	Kate McAndrew (USA)	3:06:38
