= 1997 European Athletics U23 Championships – Men's 5000 metres =

The men's 5000 metres event at the 1997 European Athletics U23 Championships was held in Turku, Finland, on 13 July 1997.

== Medalists ==
Gold	Simone Zanon; Italy
Silver	Rachid Berradi; Italy
Bronze	Sergey Lukin; Russia

== Results ==
=== Final ===
13 July

Rank	Name	Nationality	Time	Notes
1st place, gold medalist(s)	Simone Zanon	Italy	13:45.60	
2nd place, silver medalist(s)	Rachid Berradi	Italy	13.47.08	
3rd place, bronze medalist(s)	Sergey Lukin	Russia	13:48.04	
4	Mikhail Yeginov	Russia	13:49.08	
5	Neil Caddy	Great Britain	13:58.84	
6	Iván Sánchez	Spain	14:00.68	
7	Sergey Lebed	Ukraine	14:01.15	
8	Kristen Bowditch	Great Britain	14:07.13	
9	Eryk Szostak	Poland	14:07.17	
10	Samuli Vasala	Finland	14:08.39	
11	Laurent Vapaille	France	14:17.89	
12	Badre Din Zioini	France	14:18.31	
13	Mehmet Kara	Turkey	14:20.37	
14	Angelo Pacheco	Portugal	14:26.39	
15	Iván Pérez	Spain	14:36.39	
16	Carsten Schütz	Germany	14:38.81	
17	Adrian Maghiar	Romania	14:40.83	
	Sander Schutgens	Netherlands	DNF	
	Dariusz Kruczkowski	Poland	DNF	

== Participation ==
According to an unofficial count, 19 athletes from 13 countries participated in the event.

- Finland (1)
- France (2)
- Germany (1)
- Great Britain (2)
- Italy (2)
- Netherlands (1)
- Poland (2)
- Portugal (1)
- Romania (1)
- Russia (2)
- Spain (2)
- Turkey (1)
- Ukraine (1)
