= Pavel Andreyev (runner) =

Russian runner

Pavel Andreyev (Russian: Павел Андреев; also known as Pavel Andreev, born April 20, 1970) is a Russian middle-distance and long-distance runner who has won multiple US and European road races including the Dallas, Helsinki, St. Petersburg White Nights and Grandma’s marathons. He was also the silver medal winner in the 1997 Russian Athletics Championships 10,000 meters.

In 1995 and 1996, Andreyev ran dozens of road races in France. In 1995, he took home a large cup trophy after running a 1:03:49 for third place in the Paris Half Marathon.

It was 1997 when Andreyev lined up for his first marathon. At the Bordeaux Marathon, he finished sixth in 2:14:10 as his Russian peer, Dmitry Kapitonov, took first. The following year, Andreyev was second at the Lyon Marathon, clocking 2:12:21. His race earned him more than $5,000 as well as the title of Master of Sports of International Class (Russian: мастер спорта СССР международного класса), an athletic honor bestowed by the Soviet Union.

In 1999, he won the Echternach Marathon in Luxemburg with a time of 2:14:52.

In 2000, Andreyev traveled to Duluth, Minnesota, for the Grandma's Marathon. He bested the competition on way to a first place win. In 2002, he was back and ran a personal best time in the marathon race (2:11:20) to finish in second place behind Elly Rono, who won with the third-fasted time in the history of the race (only bettered by Dick Beardsley and Garry Bjorklund). His time was among the world’s fastest that year.

At the World Athletics Gold-labeled Hong Kong Marathon in 2003, Andreyev tailed Tendai Chimusasa for most of the race and hung on to finish fourth.

A big win on US soil came in 2005, when he outran more than 10,000 runners to win the Dallas Marathon in 2:15:24. He was the only non-Kenyan in the top 11.

He won the 2007 White Nights International Marathon in St. Petersburg, Russia, in 2:16:26, after running ahead of contenders Aleksy Veselov and Vladimir Ponomaryov. In prior years, the race had started at 11 p.m. and continued on through the middle of the night—though in St. Petersburg’s June nights, the sun is still over the horizon, so the finishers arrive while it is still daylight. However, by 2007, the race management shifted the start to a regular morning hour. In 2008, Andreyev returned and battled the entire race with Andrey Bryzgalov. As they approached the final stretch, they ran together and tied for the win, crossed the finish line while holding hands.

Andreyev continued to win road races in his late 30s.

== Personal life ==
Born to an artist father and a musician mother in Zelenodolsk, Russia, Andreyev entered the world of running through the military. He enrolled at the F. Dzerzhinskiy Higher Naval Engineering School in Leningrad, Russia, and joined a sports club. State leaders saw promise in his abilities and effort, and he competed at the national Junior level, launching his career.

Later in life (by 2017, after his competitive running career was complete), Andreyev coached other runners.
