= Jackson Kabiga =

Kenyan long-distance runner

Jackson Kabiga (born December 1, 1976) is a retired long-distance runner from Kenya, who won the 1998 edition of the Fukuoka Marathon, clocking a personal best 2:08:42 on December 6, 1998. He defeated Japan's Nobuyuki Sato (2:08:48). Earlier that year Kabiga triumphed in the Paris Marathon.

== Achievements ==
Year	Competition	Venue	Position	Event	Notes
Representing Kenya
1996	Vienna City Marathon	Vienna, Austria	4th	Marathon	2:15:11
1996	London Marathon	London, United Kingdom	4th	Marathon	2:10:43
1996	Chicago Marathon	Chicago, United States	6th	Marathon	2:11:44
1997	Berlin Marathon	Berlin, Germany	6th	Marathon	2:09:15
1998	Paris Marathon	Paris, France	1st	Marathon	2:09:37
1998	Fukuoka Marathon	Fukuoka, Japan	1st	Marathon	2:08:42
1999	Nagano Marathon	Nagano, Japan	1st	Marathon	2:13:26
1999	Beach to Beacon 10K	Cape Elizabeth, Maine	7th	10K	29:01
2000	Berlin Marathon	Berlin, Germany	3rd	Marathon	2:09:51
