= Nagano Olympic Commemorative Marathon =

Road running event in Japan

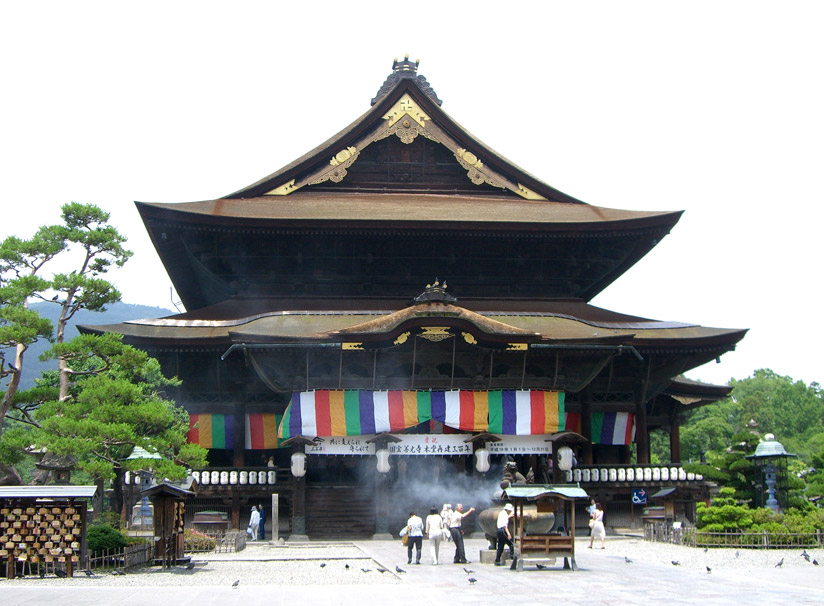
- The race passes the Zenkō-ji temple
- Date: Mid-April
- Location: Nagano, Japan
- Event type: Road
- Distance: Marathon
- Established: 1999
- Course records: Men's: 2:09:05 (2012) (Kenya) Francis Kibiwott; Women's: 2:26:38 (2008) (Russia) Alevtina Ivanova
- Website: Nagano Marathon
- Participants: 5,613 finishers (2022)

The Nagano Olympic Commemorative Marathon (Japanese: 長野オリンピック記念 長野マラソン) is an annual marathon road race which takes place in mid-April in Nagano, Japan. It is an IAAF Bronze Label Road Race competition. The Nagano Marathon has races for both elite and amateur runners. It is named in honour of the 1998 Winter Olympics which were held in Nagano.

The course has a point-to-point style and it has received accreditation from the Japan Association of Athletics Federations and AIMS. The route begins at the Nagano Sports Park and heads in a generally southern direction, passing the Zenkō-ji temple before finishing at the Nagano Olympic Stadium. The route incorporates four of the former Olympic venues into the race.

== History ==
Francis Kibiwott and Alevtina Ivanova are the current men's and women's course record holders. The 1999 route was aided by a downhill net drop of 4.27 m/km (just under the allowable limit), while the editions from 2000 to 2003 had an excessive drop of over 5 m/km, making them ineligible for record performances. The current route is relatively flat, however, with the race having an overall total incline of 5 m from start to finish.

The historical root of the competition lies with the Shinmai Marathon which was first held in 1958. The marathon came under its current moniker in 1999. The elite race is international in nature, with a number of foreign runners being invited each year, although prominent Japanese athletes also take part. Kenyans have won the majority of the men's races while Russians have dominated the women's race. Nephat Kinyanjui of Kenya won the race a record three times consecutively between 2006 and 2008. Since its rebirth in 1999, only two Japanese runners have won the race (Akiyo Onishi in 1999 and Yuki Kawauchi in 2013).

== Past winners ==
Key: Course record Downhill course

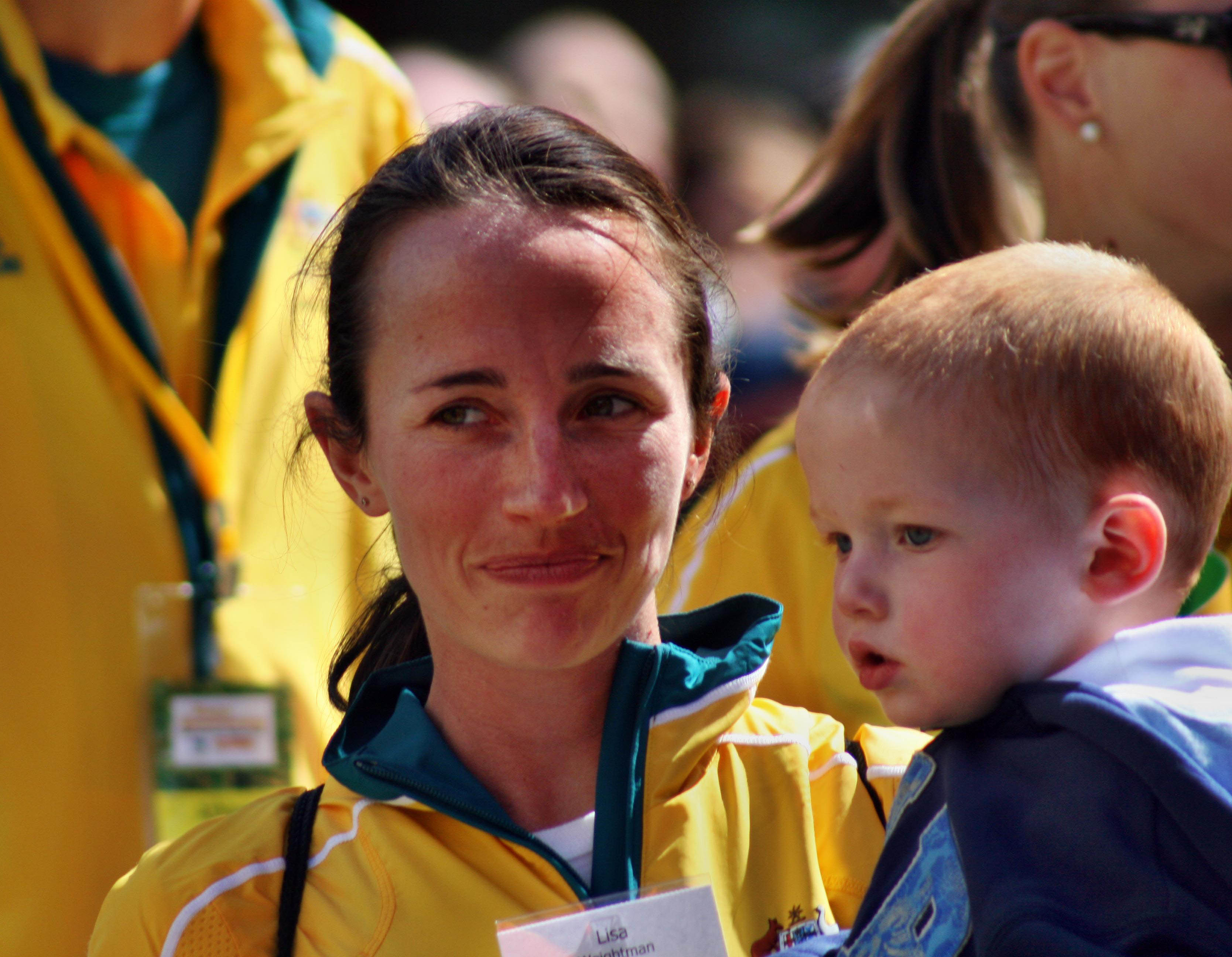
Lisa Weightman was the winner of the 2010 women's race.

=== Nagano Marathon era ===
Edition	Year	Men's winner	Time (h:m:s)	Women's winner	Time (h:m:s)
23rd	2024	Keigo Yano (JPN)	2:15:53	Rie Kawauchi (JPN)	2:33:16
22nd	2023	Kento Nishi (JPN)	2:10:01	Haruna Takano (JPN)	2:42:44
21st	2022	Junichi Ushiyama (JPN)	2:14:42	Akane Sekino (JPN)	2:41:20
–	2021	Did not held due to COVID-19 pandemic in Japan			
–	2020	Did not held due to COVID-19 pandemic in Japan			
20th	2019	Jackson Kiprop (UGA)	2:10:39	Meskerem Hunde (ETH)	2:33:32
19th	2018	Abdela Godana (ETH)	2:13:54	Asami Furuse (JPN)	2:34:09
18th	2017	Taiga Ito (JPN)	2:14:39	Rachel Mutgaa (KEN)	2:33:00
17th	2016	Jairus Chanchima (KEN)	2:15:31	Shasho Insermu (ETH)	2:34:19
16th	2015	Henry Chirchir (KEN)	2:11:39	Beatrice Toroitich (KEN)	2:34:02
15th	2014	Serhiy Lebid (UKR)	2:13:56	Alina Prokopeva (RUS)	2:30:56
14th	2013	Yuki Kawauchi (JPN)	2:14:27	Natalya Puchkova (RUS)	2:30:40
13th	2012	Francis Kibiwott (KEN)	2:09:05	Pauline Wangui (KEN)	2:34:22
–	2011	Did not held due to Tōhoku earthquake and tsunami			
12th	2010	Nicholas Chelimo (KEN)	2:10:24	Lisa Weightman (AUS)	2:28:48
11th	2009	Isaac Macharia (KEN)	2:11:21	Irina Timofeyeva (RUS)	2:30:07
10th	2008	Nephat Kinyanjui (KEN)	2:14:17	Alevtina Ivanova (RUS)	2:26:38
9th	2007	Nephat Kinyanjui (KEN)	2:13:32	Alevtina Ivanova (RUS)	2:27:49
8th	2006	Nephat Kinyanjui (KEN)	2:11:18	Albina Ivanova (RUS)	2:28:52
7th	2005	Isaac Macharia (KEN)	2:10:59	Albina Ivanova (RUS)	2:28:21
6th	2004	Moges Taye (ETH)	2:13:09	Fatuma Roba (ETH)	2:28:05
5th	2003	Erick Wainaina (KEN)	2:12:00	Madina Biktagirova (RUS)	2:28:23
4th	2002	Josia Thugwane (RSA)	2:13:23	Madina Biktagirova (RUS)	2:26:09
3rd	2001	Maxwell Musembi (KEN)	2:12:20	Akiyo Onishi (JPN)	2:31:20
2nd	2000	Erick Wainaina (KEN)	2:10:17	Elfenesh Alemu (ETH)	2:24:55
1st	1999	Jackson Kabiga (KEN)	2:13:26	Valentina Yegorova (RUS)	2:28:41

=== Shinmai Marathon era ===
Edition	Year	Men's winner	Time (h:m:s)	Women's winner	Time (h:m:s)
41st	1998	Yoshifumi Miyamoto (JPN)	2:17:34		
40th	1997	Isamu Sennai (JPN)	2:17:24		
39th	1996	Koichi Haraguchi (JPN)	2:19:20		
38th	1995	Fumiaki Makino (JPN)	2:17:22	Mineko Yamanouchi (JPN)	2:36:35
37th	1994	Yukiyasu Ogura (JPN)	2:16:10		
36th	1993	Takashi Kondo (JPN)	2:15:43		
35th	1992	Toshinobu Sato (JPN)	2:14:05		
34th	1991	Takashi Murakami (JPN)	2:16:33		
33rd	1990	Kazuya Nishimoto (JPN)	2:13:52		
32nd	1989	Yoshihiro Ohashi (JPN)	2:17:25		
31st	1988	Hideo Takamura (JPN)	2:14:44	Kumiko Fukuzawa (JPN)	2:41:39
30th	1987	Yoshizo Morita (JPN)	2:17:21		
29th	1986	Takashi Sato (JPN)	2:25:52		
28th	1985	Hiromi Nishi (JPN)	2:20:52	Tokiko Fukuhara (JPN)	3:30:26
27th	1984	Masaaki Shibusawa (JPN)	2:19:13		
26th	1983	Shuzo Nakajima (JPN)	2:17:47	Hideko Miyashita (JPN)	3:28:01
25th	1982	Fumio Inoue (JPN)	2:21:21		
24th	1981	Tadashi Matsumoto (JPN)	2:16:59	Shizue Takayama (JPN)	3:35:38
23rd	1980	Atsuhide Maeda (JPN)	2:15:23	Chie Matsuda (JPN)	2:57:07
22nd	1979	Osamu Kitahara (JPN)	2:21:10	Not held	
21st	1978	Tomio Ito (JPN)	2:22:04	Not held	
20th	1977	Haruki Okubo (JPN)	2:25:18	Not held	
19th	1976	Kaneo Hikima (JPN)	2:17:31	Not held	
18th	1975	Osamu Kitahara (JPN)	2:21:43	Not held	
17th	1974	Kunio Miura (athlete) (JPN)	2:21:28	Not held	
16th	1973	Seiji Fukada (JPN)	2:21:27	Not held	
15th	1972	Kimio Otsuka (JPN)	2:21:03.4	Not held	
14th	1971	Kimio Otsuka (JPN)	2:18:17.6	Not held	
13th	1970	Kunio Miura (athlete) (JPN)	2:21:29.0	Not held	
12th	1969	Toru Terasawa (JPN)	2:21:02.2	Not held	
11th	1968	Juichi Sato (JPN)	2:20:50.6	Not held	
10th	1967	Kunio Miura (athlete) (JPN)	2:21:27.8	Not held	
9th	1966	Tadaaki Ueoka (JPN)	2:22:36.6	Not held	
8th	1965	Kimio Karasawa (JPN)	2:22:31.6	Not held	
7th	1964	Susumu Noro (JPN)	2:23:11.6	Not held	
6th	1963	Tadayoshi Shiozuka (JPN)	2:27:05	Not held	
5th	1962	Nobuyoshi Sadanaga (JPN)	2:27:43	Not held	
4th	1961	Katsuyoshi Ito (JPN)	2:28:41	Not held	
3rd	1960	Hidenori Baba (JPN)	2:29:11	Not held	
2nd	1959	Tadaichi Ishibuchi (JPN)	2:32:07	Not held	
1st	1958	Kikuo Ono (JPN)	2:30:15	Not held	
