= Sherwood High School (Oregon) =

Public school in Sherwood, Oregon, United States

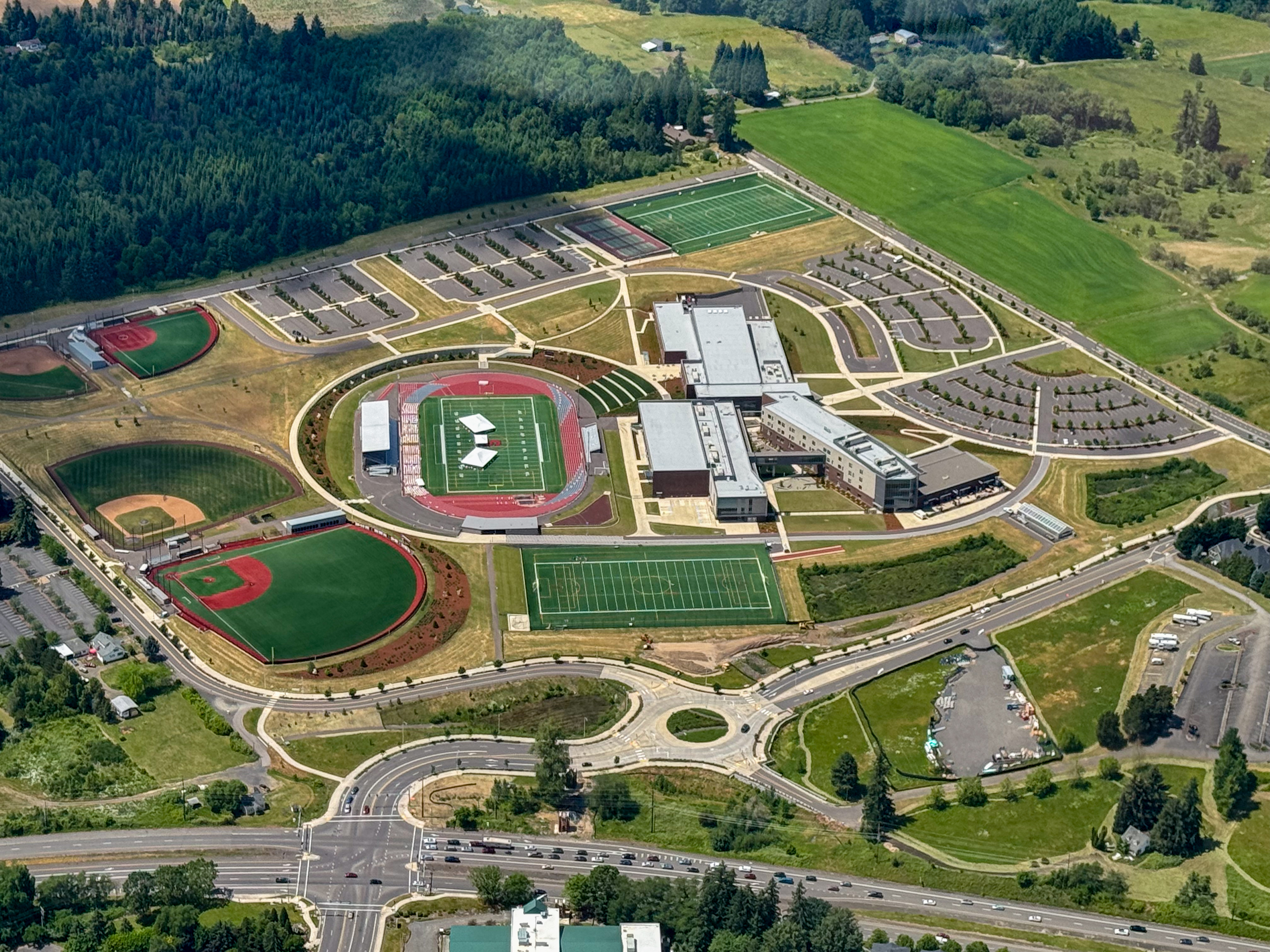
- New Sherwood High School campus

Location
- 18800 SW Haide Rd, Sherwood, OR 97140; Sherwood, (Washington County), Oregon 97140; United States; 45.35671°N 122.87082°W

Information
- Type: Public
- Opened: 1970 (New Building opened 2021)
- School district: Sherwood School District
- Principal: Joshua Pratt
- Teaching staff: 73.49 (FTE)
- Grades: 9-12
- Enrollment: 1,668 (2025-2026)
- Student to teacher ratio: 22.70
- Colors: Crimson, Black, and White
- Athletics conference: OSAA 6A-3 Pacific Conference
- Mascot: Bowman
- Team name: The Bowmen
- Rival: Newberg High School
- Newspaper: BNN (Bowmen News Network)
- Yearbook: The Quiver
- Feeder schools: Sherwood Middle School
- Website: shs.sherwood.k12.or.us

Sherwood High School (SHS) is a public high school in Sherwood, Oregon, United States. It is the only high school in the Sherwood School District.

== History ==
In 2016 the Sherwood School District funded and approved a $186–250 Million Dollar bond that would go towards a new Sherwood High School. The old building would be renovated and used as Sherwood Middle School. Construction Started in 2018 and finished in 2020. The new building was set to open for the 2020-2021 School year. However, the COVID-19 pandemic delayed the opening of the school until the 2021-2022 school year.

== Academics ==
In 2015–2016, the school's four-year graduation rate was 89.82% and its five-year graduation rate was 95.17%. The state of Oregon's average graduation rates for that year were 74.83% (four-year) and 77.82 (five-year).

== Athletics ==
Sherwood High School athletic teams compete in the OSAA 6A-3 Pacific Conference. The athletic director is Katie Hartman and the athletics secretary is Connie Pollock.

State Championships:

- Baseball: 1959, 1969, 2011, 2013
- Dance/Drill: 1994, 1998, 2006, 2023, 2024
- Cheerleading: 1999
- Girls Swimming: 2003, 2004, 2005, 2006
- Boys Swimming: 2005, 2006
- Girls Soccer: 2007, 2011, 2016
- Football: 2010, 2012
- Volleyball: 2010

=== Aaron J. Contreras Stadium ===
In 2004, the Sherwood High School stadium was renamed to the "Aaron J. Contreras Memorial Stadium." In memory of Captain Aaron J. Contreras. Contreras attended Sherwood High School and would later attend and graduate from Embry–Riddle Aeronautical University before joining the US Marines. Contreras died in a helicopter crash in southern Iraq in 2003.

== Alumni ==
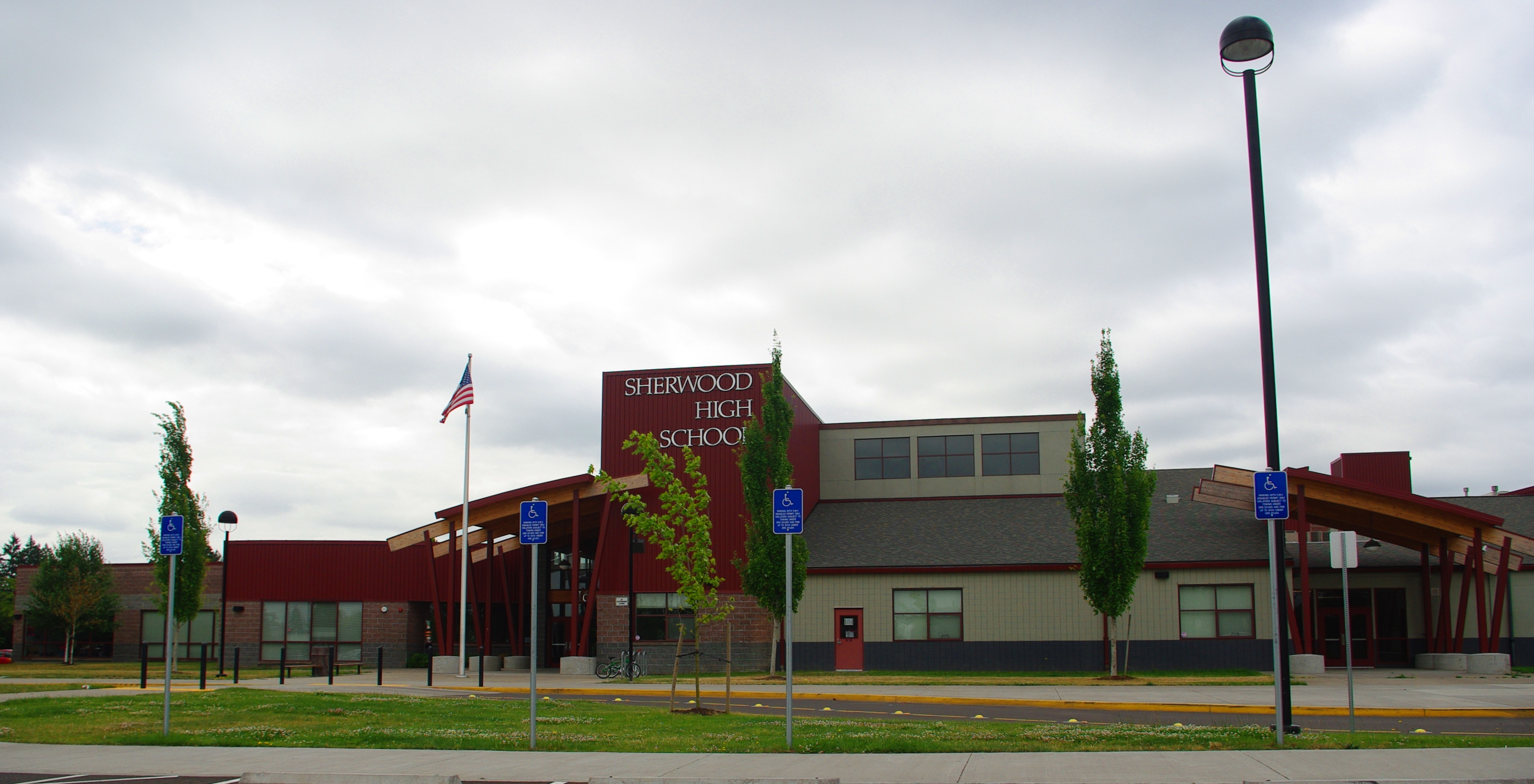
Old Sherwood High School building

- Del Baker, baseball player, manager
- Jiggs Parrott, baseball player
- Tom Parrott, baseball player
- Bud Podbielan, baseball player
- Dave Edstrom, decathlete
- Chuck Sun, motocross
- Ilsa Paulson, (Class of 2006) runner
- Adley Rutschman, (Class of 2016) MLB baseball player
