= 1997 European Athletics U23 Championships – Men's 10,000 metres =

The men's 10,000 metres event at the 1997 European Athletics U23 Championships was held in Turku, Finland, on 10 July 1997.

== Medalists ==
Gold	Rachid Berradi; Italy
Silver	Sergey Lebed; Ukraine
Bronze	Simone Zanon; Italy

== Results ==
=== Final ===
10 July

Rank	Name	Nationality	Time	Notes
1st place, gold medalist(s)	Rachid Berradi	Italy	28:31.12	
2nd place, silver medalist(s)	Sergey Lebed	Ukraine	28:39.71	
3rd place, bronze medalist(s)	Simone Zanon	Italy	28:56.33	
4	José Ramallo	Spain	29:22.79	
5	Sergey Lukin	Russia	29:23.70	
6	Zorislav Gapeyenko	Belarus	29:27.36	
7	Jussi Virtanen	Finland	29:34.84	
8	Dariusz Kruczkowski	Poland	29:40.29	
9	Manuel Magalhães	Portugal	29:42.26	
10	Tom Compernolle	Belgium	29:49.96	
11	Janko Benša	Yugoslavia	29:54.31	
12	Wiesław Figurski	Poland	30:15.98	
13	Fecri İdin	Turkey	30:16.45	
	Roberto García	Spain	DNF	

== Participation ==
According to an unofficial count, 14 athletes from 11 countries participated in the event.

- Belarus (1)
- Belgium (1)
- Finland (1)
- Italy (2)
- Poland (2)
- Portugal (1)
- Russia (1)
- Spain (2)
- Turkey (1)
- Ukraine (1)
- Yugoslavia (1)
