= Rachid Berradi =

Italian long-distance runner (born 1975)

Personal information
- National team: Italy
- Born: 29 August 1975 (age 51) Meknès, Morocco

Sport
- Sport: Athletics
- Event: Long-distance running
Medal record
Representing Italy
Summer Universiade
Bronze medal – third place	1997 Catania	10,000m
European U23 Championships
Gold medal – first place	1997 Turku	10,000m
Silver medal – second place	1997 Turku	5000m

Rachid Meknes Berradi (born 29 August 1975) is an Italian long-distance runner who specializes in the 10,000 metres.

== Biography ==
His personal best time is 27:54.23 minutes, achieved in July 2000 in Nembro. This places him eleventh on the Italian all-time performers list, behind Salvatore Antibo, Francesco Panetta, Venanzio Ortis, Alberto Cova, Franco Fava, Stefano Mei, Stefano Baldini, Giuliano Battocletti, Christian Leuprecht and Daniele Caimmi.

== Achievements ==
Year	Competition	Venue	Position	Event	Notes
Representing Italy
1997	Universiade	Catania, Italy	3rd	10,000 m	28:30.05
1997	European U23 Championships	Turku, Finland	2nd	5000 m	13.47.08
1997	European U23 Championships	Turku, Finland	1st	10,000 m	28:31.12
1998	European Championships	Budapest, Hungary	7th	10,000 m	28:22.31
2000	Olympic Games	Sydney, Australia	17th	10,000 m	28:45.96
2002	European Championships	Munich, Germany	10th	10,000 m	28:24.31
2002	World Half Marathon Championships	Brussels, Belgium	7th	Half marathon	1:01:32
2002	World Half Marathon Championships	Brussels, Belgium	5th	Team competition	3:07:53

== See also ==
- Italian all-time lists - Half marathon
