= Miharati =

- Location within Kenya
- Coordinates: 0.4°S 36.48°E
- Country: Kenya
- Province: Central Province
- Time zone: UTC+3 (EAT)

Miharati is a location in Kipipiri Division, Kipipiri Constituency, Nyandarua County, Central Province, Kenya. It is situated just below Mount Kipipiri. Miharati borders Wanjohi and Kiambogo to the east, Lereshwa to the west, Githioro to the south and Malewa to the north. It is about 105 km north of Nairobi City and about 538 km from Mombasa. The area between the road to Miharati police station, the road entering town and where the market starts had a big pyrethrum drying factory. Outside there were very many pyrethrum flower holding troughs before taken in factory for drying. Near the troughs there was bore hole used to provide water for the factory drier diesel engines and mzungus house which is the current miharati police station. Government constructed police residential houses. Water tank reservoir was near health centre but was later pulled down.
