= Madina Biktagirova =

Russian athletics competitor

Personal information
- Born: 20 September 1964 (age 61) Osh, Kirghiz SSR, USSR
- Height: 5 ft 2 in (1.57 m)
- Weight: 101 lb (46 kg)

Sport
- Country: Unified Team, Belarus, Russia, CIS
- Sport: Athletics
- Event: Marathon

Achievements and titles
- Olympic finals: 2000 marathon, 5th
- World finals: 1993 marathon, 5th
Medal record
Women's athletics
Representing Russia
European Championships
Silver medal – second place	1998 Budapest	Marathon

Madina Ulfatovna Biktagirova (Belarusian: Мадзіна Ульфатаўна Біктагірава, Russian: Мадина Ульфатовна Биктагирова; born 20 September 1964 in Osh, Kirghiz Soviet Socialist Republic, Soviet Union) is a retired long-distance runner. She competed for both Belarus and Russia.

== Professional career ==
In 1992, Biktagirova set a course record at the Los Angeles Marathon in a time of 2:26:23.

Biktagirova set her personal best in 1997, clocking 2:24:46. She won the 2002 and 2003 editions of the Nagano Olympic Commemorative Marathon.

== Olympic career ==
Biktagirova competed in three Olympic games under three different flags. She finished fourth in the marathon at the 1992 Olympics, competing for the Unified Olympic team. After the race, she tested positive for norephedrine and became the first Olympic marathoner disqualified for failing a drug test.

Biktagirova competed in the marathon at the 1996 Summer Olympics for Belarus, a race in which she did not finish. She ran the marathon for Russia at the 2000 Summer Olympics, finishing in 5th place.

== Achievements ==
Year	Competition	Venue	Position	Event	Notes
Representing CIS
1992	Los Angeles Marathon	Los Angeles, United States	1st	Marathon	2:26:23
Representing Unified Team
1992	Olympic Games	Barcelona, Spain	—	Marathon	DSQ
Representing Belarus
1993	World Championships	Stuttgart, Germany	5th	Marathon	2:34:36
1996	Olympic Games	Atlanta, United States	—	Marathon	DNF
Representing Russia
1997	Nagoya Marathon	Nagoya, Japan	1st	Marathon	2:29:30
1998	European Championships	Budapest, Hungary	2nd	Marathon	2:28:01
2000	Olympic Games	Sydney, Australia	5th	Marathon	2:26:33
2001	London Marathon	London, United Kingdom	10th	Marathon	2:27:14
2001	New York City Marathon	New York City, United States	9th	Marathon	2:31:14
2002	Nagano Marathon	Nagano, Japan	1st	Marathon	2:26:09
2003	Nagano Marathon	Nagano, Japan	1st	Marathon	2:28:23
2003	Lisbon Marathon	Lisbon, Portugal	1st	Marathon	2:42:06
2007	Two Oceans Marathon	Cape Town, South Africa	1st	Ultra-Marathon	3:35:11
