= NexBank =

American private state-chartered bank

- Formerly: Terrell Federal Savings and Loan Association; Heritage Savings Bank; Heritage Bank
- Company type: Private
- Industry: Financial services
- Founded: 1922; 104 years ago
- Headquarters: Dallas, Texas, United States
- Area served: Texas
- Key people: Matt Siekelski, President & CEO; James Dondero, Founder and Chairman
- Services: Banking services
- Total assets: $13.9 billion (2024)
- Website: www.nexbank.com

Nexbank is an American regional bank that is headquartered in Dallas, Texas. It is state-chartered and overseen by the Federal Deposit Insurance Corporation (FDIC). The bank provides financial services in institutional banking, commercial banking, and mortgage banking and is based in Texas, where it has three branches.

Its parent is financial services company NexBank Capital, Inc. As of 2022, NexBank had assets of almost $14 billon and was "the largest privately held bank in Texas."

== History ==
The bank was founded in 1922 as Terrell Federal Savings and Loan Association, a community bank located in Terrell, Texas, and became a mutual savings bank in 1999, when it changed its name to Heritage Savings Bank, SSB.

It became a stock savings bank in 2002 and shortened its name to Heritage Bank, SSB. The bank moved to Dallas in 2004, after it was acquired by partners in Highland Capital, and changed its name to NexBank, SSB, in 2005. It acquired Princeton Savings Bank in Princeton, New Jersey, in 2015 and changed to a commercial bank in 2020, when it changed its name to NexBank.
