= List of Russian Athletics Championships winners =

The Russian Athletics Championships (Russian: Чемпионат России по лёгкой атлетике) is an annual outdoor track and field competition organised by the All-Russia Athletic Federation (ARAF), which serves as the Russian national championship for the sport. The competition was first held in 1908, during the time of the Russian Empire. The competition had nine editions during this period, lasting up to 1916, at which point it was ceased as a result of the October Revolution and was effectively replaced in 1920 by the inauguration of the Soviet Athletics Championships. During this period, separate championships for the Russian Soviet Federative Socialist Republic were occasionally held (with the first two editions occurring in 1922 and 1927 in Moscow), though mostly the Russian championships was merged into the larger Soviet one. After the dissolution of the Soviet Union in 1991, Russia was restored as an independent country and the Russian Athletics Championships was re-initiated, starting from 1992 after a shared CIS Athletics Championships in 1991.

== Men ==
=== 24-hour run ===
- 1993: Nikolay Safin
- 1994: Eduard Khikov
- 1995: Ivan Bogdanov
- 1996: Ivan Bogdanov
- 1997: Timur Abzalov
- 1998: Sergey Ishmulkin
- 1999: Nasibula Khusnullin
- 2000: Andrey Kazantsev
- 2001: Ivan Labutin
- 2002: Vladimir Romanov
- 2003: Dmitriy Tishin
- 2004: Vladimir Bychkov
- 2005: Timur Abzalov

== Women ==
=== 24-hour run ===
- 1994: Svetlana Savoskina
- 1995: Nadezhda Tarasova
- 1996: Rimma Paltseva
- 1997: Yelena Sidorenkova
- 1998: Irina Reutovich
- 1999: Irina Reutovich
- 2000: Irina Reutovich
- 2001: Lyudmila Kalinina
- 2002: Lyudmila Kalinina
- 2003: Galina Yeremina
- 2004: Galina Yeremina
- 2005: Lyudmila Kalinina
