= Irina Safarova =

Russian long-distance runner

Irina Safarova (Russian: Ирина Сафарова; born 19 June 1969) is a Russian long-distance runner. Safarova competed in the 1997, 1998, 2001, 2002 and 2004 IAAF World Half Marathon Championships, the 2002 European Athletics Championships (marathon), and the 2003 European Cross Country Championships.

She also won the 2000 Hong Kong Marathon (2:46:59), the 2001 California International Marathon (2:36:36), and the 2005 Country Music Marathon (2:33:53).

== International competitions ==
Representing Russia
Year	Competition	Venue	Position	Event	Result	Notes
2002	European Championships	Munich, Germany	20th	Marathon	2:49:21	

== Professional marathons ==
Year	Competition	Venue	Position	Result	Notes
2000	Hong Kong Marathon	Hong Kong, China	1st	2:46:59	
2001	California International Marathon	Sacramento, United States	1st	2:36:36	
2004	San Diego Marathon	San Diego, United States	3rd	2:33:23	
2005	Country Music Marathon	Nashville, United States	1st	2:33:53	
2005	Las Vegas Marathon	Las Vegas, United States	5th	2:33:34	
2006	Los Angeles Marathon	Los Angeles, United States	5th	2:34:45	
2007	Siberian International Marathon	Omsk, Russia	4th	2:45:54	
2009	Country Music Marathon	Nashville, United States	4th	2:42:38	
