= Highland Capital Management =

Alternative investment management firm

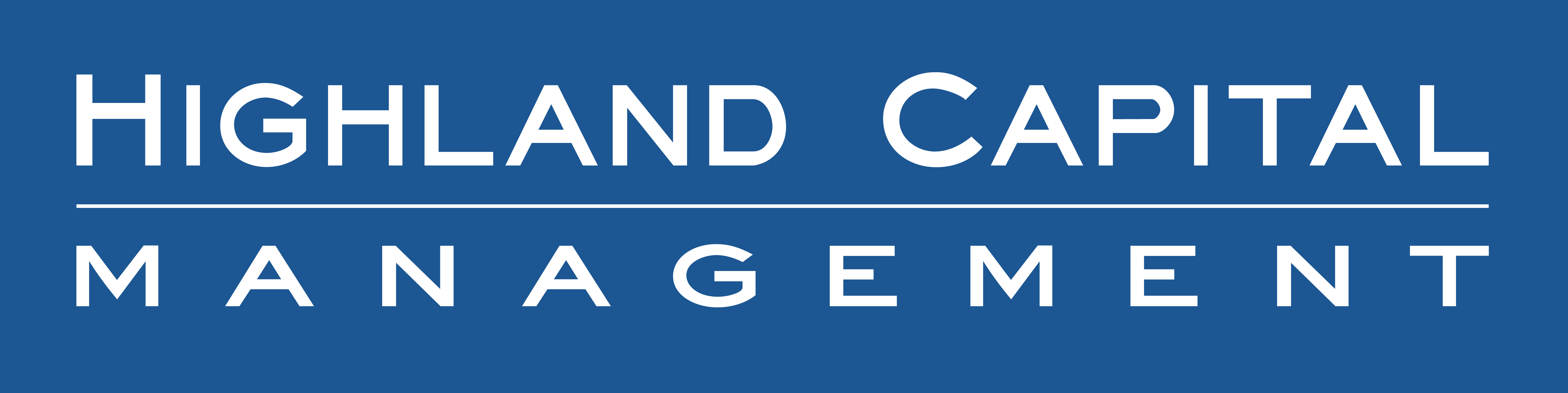
- Type: Private
- Industry: Asset management
- Founded: 1993; 33 years ago
- Founders: James Dondero; Mark Okada
- Headquarters: Dallas, Texas, United States
- Key people: Mark Okada; Trey Parker (CIO)
- Products: Investment fund Hedge fund Mutual fund
- Total assets: $8.3 billion
- Number of employees: 115
- Website: www.highlandcapital.com

Highland Capital Management is an alternative investment management firm that manages hedge funds, structured investment vehicles and mutual funds. The firm invests in global public equities, as well as fixed income markets with a focus on leveraged loans, high yield bonds, and structured products.

The firm is headquartered in Dallas, Texas. It also operates offices in New York City, São Paulo, Buenos Aires, Seoul and Singapore. Highland reported approximately $13.9 billion of assets under management in 2018.

In October 2019, Highland Capital Management filed for Chapter 11 bankruptcy protection.

== Overview ==
Highland Capital Management was founded in 1993 by James Dondero and Mark Okada. The firm was responsible for designing the first software to electronically track loan portfolios, which is used by a majority of loan managers. Highland sold the software to JPMorgan Chase in 2003. In April 2004, Highland entered the mutual fund space with its acquisition of Columbia Management Advisors' bank loan mutual fund business. The company acquired NexBank in 2004. In April 2005, Highland acquired ING Capital Management. The acquisition marked Highland's first move into Europe.

Highland Capital Management has been involved in a number of high profile bankruptcies and reorganizations related to distressed debt investments. Highland was involved in the bankruptcy of Bridge Information Systems in 2001. Highland worked with Delphi Corporation through Delphi's reorganization in December 2006.

In 2011, Highland moved its offices from the Galleria in far north Dallas to the Crescent Complex uptown. Highland is a founding benefactor of the George W. Bush Presidential Center and, in early 2018, the firm provided the center with a $10 million endowment to back a series of public programs.

== Investments ==
Highland manages the Highland Floating Rate Opportunities Fund (NYSE: HFRO), among other closed-end funds. The company launched its first European regulated fund in 2014, the BB Highland Floating Rate Fund, through Banco do Brasil. The new fund, launched as an Irish Qualified Investor Fund, was built to replicate the previous Highland Floating Rate Opportunities Fund which Morningstar named the number one Bank Loan Fund for one, three and five year periods among 213, 168 and 111 funds. Highland's Fund Class Z won the Lipper Award in 2014 for Best Loan Participation Fund over three years.

In February 2010, the firm announced the completion of its CLO Value Fund I, which was launched in November 2008 to invest in secondary CLO debt and equity. Highland launched the Highland/iBoxx Senior Loan ETF in November 2012. In June 2018, the firm launched a UCITS fund focused on collateralized loan obligation (CLO) debt.

Highland Capital Management Fund Advisors is an investment adviser and subsidiary of Highland, which is registered with the SEC. HCM Fund Advisors works with investment companies and manages equity, fixed income and balanced mutual funds. HCM Fund Advisors also manages exchange-traded funds (ETFs) based on research from Hedge Fund Research, Inc. The first three ETFs launched by the company and traded on the New York Stock Exchange were Highland HFR Global ETF, Highland HFR Event Driven ETF, and Highland HFR Equity Hedge ETF.

The Highland Global Allocation Fund was valued at $947 million in September 2016. In August 2018, Highland acquired Cityplace Tower from Parmenter Realty Partners and Angelo, Gordon & Co. The transaction was one of the largest building sales in Dallas in 2018.
