= Ilsa Paulson =

American marathoner

Ilsa Paulson (born November 8, 1988) is an American long-distance runner who specializes in marathon running. She was the winner of the 2009 USA Marathon Championships, hosted at the Twin Cities Marathon.

== Early life ==
Paulson attended Sherwood High School in Oregon and was a state high school cross country champion while there.

== Career ==
Originally from Oregon, Paulson decided to leave Northern Arizona University at age 19 after her first year there in order to concentrate on a professional running career. A religious person, she made the decision after a period of prayer. She trained under coach Jack Daniels.

Paulson won the citizen's race of the 2008 Bolder Boulder in her first 10K run outing and moved into the professional ranks two months later, placing in the top twenty at the Peachtree Road Race as the fastest American woman. She made her first half marathon appearance by placing ninth in the New York Half Marathon with a time of 1:13:22. She ran in the USA 20K Championships held at the New Haven Road Race and placed third in 1:08:55 after losing a sprint to the finish against Jill Steffens and Elva Dryer. She closed her debut year with eighth at the Rock ‘n’ Roll San Jose Half Marathon and 15th at the New York City Marathon, recording 2:41:17 hours on her debut over the marathon distance.

In 2010 she was runner-up at the Arizona Half Marathon, fourth at the Mardi Gras Half Marathon in a personal record of 1:13:15, then won the Country Music Marathon with a time of 2:33:41 hours. Paulson was the first ever American winner at the Country Music Marathon. She did not compete in 2011 or 2012 and, after completing three half marathon runs slower than 80 minutes in 2013, she stopped competing at a high level. She later moved to Abu Dhabi.

== Road races ==
- 2010 Rock 'n' Roll Nashville Marathon 1st place, 2:33:39
- 2009 Twin Cities Marathon 1st place, 2:31:49
- 2009 New York Half Marathon 6th place, 1:13:20
- 2008 USA Women's 20k Run 3rd place, 1:08.55
- 2008 New York City Marathon 15th place, 2:41:17
