= Siberian International Marathon =

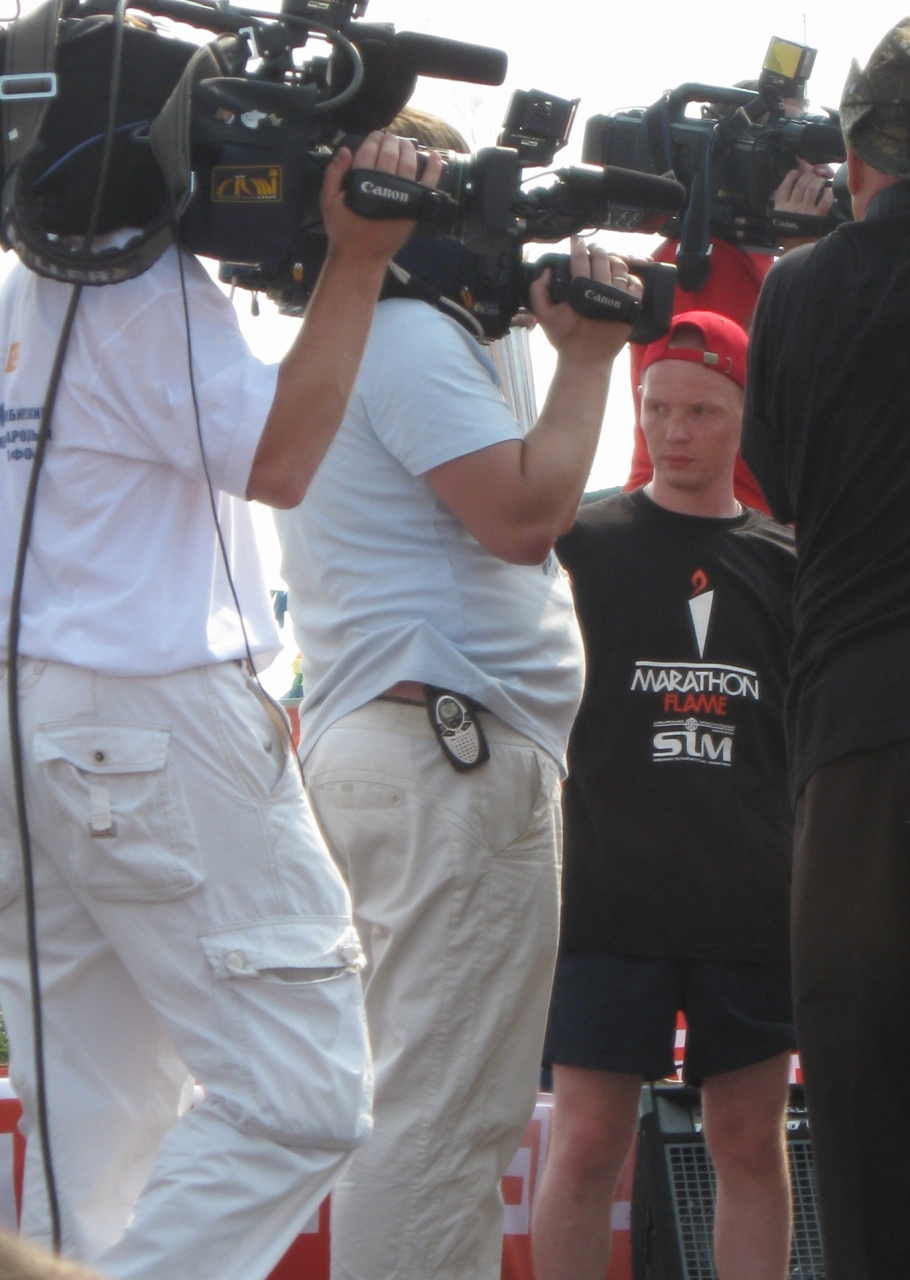
- Aleksei Tishchenko promoting the 2010 Siberian International Marathon
- Date: First Saturday in August
- Location: Omsk, Siberia, Russia
- Event type: Road
- Distance: Marathon, 10K run
- Established: 1990
- Course records: Men's: 2:13:03 (1993) (Russia) Eduard Tukhbatullin; Women's: 2:30:21 (2002) (Russia) Albina Mayorova
- Website: Siberian International Marathon
- Participants: 378 finishers (2021); 462 finishers (2019)

Siberian International Marathon (SIM; Russian: Сибирский международный марафон) is a marathon road race held in Omsk, Russia, since 1990 as part of the City Days festivities. It takes place during the week of St. Ilya's Day, the patron saint of Omsk, in early August. The winter half-marathon is during the January 7 Orthodox Christmas week.

The race date was moved forward a week in 2012 so that the start time exactly coincided with that of the 2012 Olympic men's marathon held in London. It was delayed until September in 2013 due to the 2013 World Championships in Athletics being held in Moscow during that period.

It was organised in 1990 by Dmitri Khodko and Sergei Govrilov as an attempt to open Omsk to foreigners. The foreign participation was headed by Claude Fisicaro, an Australian living in London, through a running club called World Runners, who ran in aid of ending hunger. Later directors of the Los Angeles Marathon and the New York City Marathon actively participated in the early years of the Siberian International Marathon. The first marathon was attended by 1800 athletes, including 32 foreigners from 9 countries one of which was British MP John Austin-Walker, and a Kenyan marathon runner who due to flight difficulty arrived the morning of the marathon. Since the early 1990s, the marathon has attracted thousands of participants each year and the number is growing annually.

It is designated as an World Athletics Bronze Label Road Race, making it the only such competition in the country to hold World Athletics status. In spite of its international nature, only one foreign athlete (Cosmas Musyoka of Kenya) topped the podium at the competition between 1990 and 2010.

The 2020 through 2022 races were held virtually because of the COVID-19 pandemic and the Russian invasion of Ukraine, respectively.

== Events ==
The events for the Siberian International Marathon include:

- Marathon (42 km 195m - distance is certified by the AIMS). First ten women and men receive monetary prizes.
- Wheelchair marathon (42 km 195m). First ten women and men receive monetary prizes.
- Marathon relay (42 km 195m; six participants; legs of 5, 10, 5, 10, 5, and 7.195 kilometer). First three male and female teams receive monetary prizes.
- Speedskating marathon (42 km 195m). Marathon on in-line skates. First three receive monetary prizes.

== Past winners ==
NOTE: no race in 2020 nor 2022.

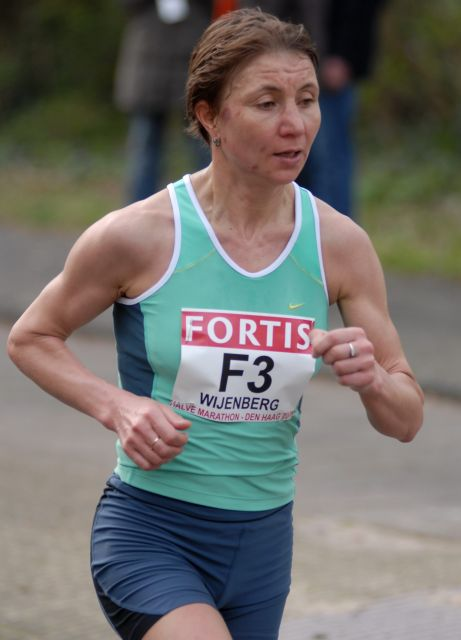
Nadezhda Wijenberg won the women's race in 1994.

Key: Course record

Edition	Year	Men's winner	Time (h:m:s)	Women's winner	Time (h:m:s)
1st	1990	Yuri Porotov (URS)	2:17:48	Galina Kuragina (URS)	2:42:13
2nd	1991	Rustam Shagiev (URS)	2:16:54	Natalia Repeshko (URS)	2:38:46
3rd	1992	Nikolay Kerimov (RUS)	2:17:28	Lutsia Belyayeva (RUS)	2:32:15
4th	1993	Eduard Tukhbatullin (RUS)	2:13:03	Elena Razdrogina (RUS)	2:38:20
5th	1994	Rustam Shagiev (RUS)	2:17:05	Nadezhda Wijenberg (RUS)	2:33:49
6th	1995	Yakov Tolstikov (RUS)	2:14:37	Alina Ivanova (RUS)	2:32:21
7th	1996	Anatoliy Archakov (RUS)	2:15:20	Elena Razdrogina (RUS)	2:35:16
8th	1997	Vladimir Epanov (RUS)	2:15:54	Elvira Kolpakova (RUS)	2:35:22
9th	1998	Vladimir Netreba (RUS)	2:19:15	Alina Ivanova (RUS)	2:31:44
10th	1999	Mikhail Khobotov (RUS)	2:15:14	Anfisa Kosacheva (RUS)	2:35:09
11th	2000	Mikhail Khobotov (RUS)	2:18:05	Irina Timofeyeva (RUS)	2:34:07
12th	2001	Eduard Tukhbatullin (RUS)	2:20:43	Irina Safarova (RUS)	2:33:08
13th	2002	Cosmas Musyoka (KEN)	2:17:38	Albina Ivanova (RUS)	2:30:21
14th	2003	Mikhail Khobotov (RUS)	2:17:40	Anfisa Kosacheva (RUS)	2:40:16
15th	2004	Mikhail Khobotov (RUS)	2:14:44	Liliya Yadzhak (RUS)	2:39:53
16th	2005	Mikhail Khobotov (RUS)	2:20:23	Liliya Yadzhak (RUS)	2:39:14
17th	2006	Sergey Lukin (RUS)	2:16:41	Liliya Yadzhak (RUS)	2:38:40
18th	2007	Sergey Lukin (RUS)	2:18:39	Iraida Pudorkina (RUS)	2:39:00
19th	2008	Andrey Bryzgalov (RUS)	2:15:29	Liliya Yadzhak (RUS)	2:33:41
20th	2009	Sergey Lukin (RUS)	2:15:06	Yevgenia Danilova (RUS)	2:34:52
21st	2010	Oleg Marusin (RUS)	2:17:06	Marina Kovalyova (RUS)	2:39:45
22nd	2011	Keyo Kiplimo (KEN)	2:14:25	Nina Podnebesnova (RUS)	2:37:22
23rd	2012	Nikolay Grigorov (RUS)	2:49:06	Volha Mazuronak (BLR)	2:44:47
24th	2013	Ketema Nigusse (ETH)	2:13:23	Yevgenia Danilova (RUS)	2:31:50
25th	2014	John Kyui (KEN)	2:14:50	Purity Kimetto (KEN)	2:38:53
26th	2015	Laban Moiben (KEN)	2:18:18	Albina Mayorova (RUS)	2:34:14
27th	2016	Andrey Bryzgalov (RUS)	2:21:34	Marina Kovalyova (RUS)	2:36:13
28th	2017	Andrey Leyman (RUS)	2:18:58	Irina Yumanova (RUS)	2:39:20
29th	2018	Andrey Leyman (RUS)	2:17:03	Yevdokiya Bukina (RUS)	2:36:25
30th	2019	Andrey Leyman (RUS)	2:19:56	Yevdokiya Bukina (RUS)	2:35:50
31st	2021	Aleksey Reunkov (RUS)	2:15:39	Marina Kovalyova (RUS)	2:29:11
32nd	2023	Eric Kering (KEN)	2:15:03	Alina Prokopeva (RUS)	2:35:42
33rd	2024	John Rotich (KEN)	2:17:04	Aleksandra Morozova (RUS)	2:34:34
