= Med City Marathon =

- 2021 Med City Marathon logo
- Date: May 16, 2027
- Location: Rochester, Minnesota
- Event type: Paved Road and Trail
- Distance: 26.2 miles (42.2 km)
- Primary sponsor: Active Physical Therapy and Sports Medicine
- Established: 1996
- Course records: Men: 2:25:54 (2005); Pete Gilman; Women: 2:56:30 (2002); Kathy Neises
- Website: medcitymarathon.com
- Participants: 350+

The Med City Marathon is an annual marathon in Rochester, Minnesota, started 1996. The race course is certified by the USATF and is one of the races in the US that can qualify a runner for the Boston Marathon. Although the race was formerly a point-to-point course from the Rochester International Airport, to the Mayo Civic Center in downtown Rochester, the 25th running in 2021 saw a course change to a two-loop route around the city. Previously, Mayo Clinic and Scheels were main sponsors of the marathon. In 2021, Rochester's Active PT and Sports became the main sponsor.

== Course ==
Prior to 2021, the marathon was a point-to-point race with one large loop. The race started near the Rochester International Airport, right off US Route 63. The course went north for eight miles through rural agricultural area before turning east at the Zumbro River, following paved trails to Soldiers Field Golf Course and Mayo Park into Rochester.

The course continued in the city, going east on roads for more than a mile, turned at Quarry Hill Nature Center, and followed the north banks of Silver Creek and Silver Lake before following Cascade Creek west past Cascade Lake. The race route went south and connected the loop, and the runners followed the Zumbro once again, this time ending at the Mayo Civic Center.

== Race weekend ==
The race weekend begins with the Med City Fitness Expo in the Mayo Civic Center. Outside the expo, the Altra Federal Credit Union 5K kicks off the race weekend. The Ronald McDonald family 1.8 mile walk and various kids races add to the festivities. The following day, a 20-mile race, a half marathon and a marathon relay start in the morning at the same time and place as the marathon.

== History ==
Heat has been a factor in this southern Minnesota marathon. In 2006, the hot air forced race organizers to close the race after three hours. The start time was moved up an hour the next year. In 2018, the marathon, marathon relay, and the 20-mile race were canceled due to hot weather again. Runners in that year were given entry in the half-marathon.

The race was founded and directed for many years by local runners Wally and Peggy Arnold, though the local YMCA took management for a few years.

In 2009, race officials faced new competition from two more marathons, St. Croix Events' Stillwater Marathon and Team Ortho's Minneapolis Marathon. Both new events were scheduled for the same week as Med City, which was already facing competition from the other large regional marathons: Fargo and Madison. Race directors for the Stillwater and Minneapolis marathons claimed their race weekends would draw more than 4,000 runners (each), so many people questioned whether Med City would survive. Consistency prevailed though, and by 2016, both the Stillwater and Minneapolis marathons folded.

The course has changed several times through the years. In 1996, the course did a few loops in the city. The course had a slight change in 1998, but then in 2007, the marathon course started runners in Byron, Minnesota. Changes were made again to shift the start from west side of Byron, where the school is, to the east side of the town.

Race directors in 2013 changed the running route more to avoid crossing trains tracks late in the race. In previous years, Canadian Pacific managers would not halt trains during the marathon, despite the requests from race directors. Most races saw no problem, but in 2001, a train moving through on race day caused a five-minute delay for many runners. It happened again in 2013 as a cold rain fell on runners at the 25-mile mark. The next year, the course was shifted. Now runners cross tracks only at the beginning of the race.

2019 saw a totally new course, when the start of the race was moved just north of Stewartville, Minnesota, near the Rochester International Airport.

In 2014, 413 runners finished the full marathon. One of the first-time marathon racers was 50-year-old Tim Walz, who was the U.S. representative for Minnesota's 1st congressional district. Walz is now Minnesota's governor and in 2024 was selected as the Vice Presidential nominee for the Democratic Party. He finished in 4:46:22.

An official race sponsor was added in 2015: the North Dakota-based Scheels, which had opened a large store in the Apache Mall that year.

In March 2020, the COVID-19 pandemic in Minnesota (caused by the virus SARS-CoV-2) had spread to Minnesota and Gov. Tim Walz ordered nearly all places of gathering and commerce closed with an executive order to stay at home. Run for the Lakes Marathon and Grandma's Marathon canceled all races, and the Boston Marathon decided to postpone their 2020 race.

By April 6, nearly 1,000 people in the state had contracted COVID-19, and the race organizers decided to postpone the race weekend to September 5–6. By June 23, the Boston Marathon and Twin Cities Marathon (in October) had canceled all events, but Med City was still on for early September. But on July 20, race director Mark Bongers put out a press release announcing the cancelation of the marathon, writing that "after conversations with the Minnesota Department of Health, members of the Minnesota Running Industry Task Force, the USATF, Mayo Clinic Emergency Medicine physicians, our sponsors and community leaders on how we could safely race, we came to the conclusion that it just isn't possible with so many ongoing uncertainties surrounding the COVID-19 pandemic."

In 2021, the race was postponed again, in the hopes that it would run September 12 with the blessing of the department of health and the city of Rochester. Although COVID-19 cases were rising again, the race was held, though the number of participants was much lower. When the race took place, spectators saw the closest ever finish. Levi Severson came from behind Mike Walentiny at mile 26 and took first by just 15 seconds.

As of 2021, six people had run the marathon every year: Allen Holtz, Jeff Miller, Nels Pierson, Pete Martin, Tom Perri, and Ward Lenius.

In 2023, the race was planned before Memorial Day weekend for the first time.

== Results ==
Key: Course record

All cities in Minnesota unless indicated otherwise

	Men					Women					
Year	Place	Name	Age	Hometown	Time	Year	Place	Name	Age	Hometown	Time
2021	1st place, gold medalist(s)	Levi Severson	41	Edina	2:41:19	2021	1st place, gold medalist(s)	Madison Hirsch	27	Rochester	3:12:18
2021	2nd place, silver medalist(s)	Mike Walentiny	33	Lewiston	2:41:34	2021	2nd place, silver medalist(s)	Arianna Whitney	29	Chatfield	3:20:21
2021	3rd place, bronze medalist(s)	Jeremy McJunkin	41	Rochester	2:52:21	2021	3rd place, bronze medalist(s)	Abi Salm	23	Plymouth	3:27:22
2020		Race canceled due to COVID-19 pandemic**				2020		Race canceled due to COVID-19 pandemic**			
2019	1st place, gold medalist(s)	Matt Barrett	32	Verona, Wisconsin	2:29:16	2019	1st place, gold medalist(s)	Jia Xuan Huang	37	Shenandoah, Iowa	3:25:18
2019	2nd place, silver medalist(s)	Andemariam Hagos	39	Rochester	2:39:34	2019	2nd place, silver medalist(s)	Caressa Barth	33	Winsted	3:27:17
2019	3rd place, bronze medalist(s)	Braden Richardson	34	Byron	2:41:03	2019	3rd place, bronze medalist(s)	Brigid Karelitz	43	St. Paul	3:28:44
2018		Race canceled due to excessive heat				2018		Race canceled due to excessive heat			
2017	1st place, gold medalist(s)	Jackson Lindquist	23	Carlton	2:34:25	2017	1st place, gold medalist(s)	Jessica Rollie	32	Rochester	3:10:02
2017	2nd place, silver medalist(s)	Brock Tesdahl	25	Hopkins	2:43:06	2017	2nd place, silver medalist(s)	Allison Lozano	43	Lake Elmo	3:26:50
2017	3rd place, bronze medalist(s)	Chris Frisch	32	Rochester	2:48:48	2017	3rd place, bronze medalist(s)	Brie McSherry	34	Woodbury	3:30:02
2016	1st place, gold medalist(s)	Connor Branick	22	Sioux Falls, South Dakota	2:42:34	2016	1st place, gold medalist(s)	Mary Chestolowski	44	Rochester	3:03:09
2016	2nd place, silver medalist(s)	Mark Evans	42	Appleton, Wisconsin	2:50:43	2016	2nd place, silver medalist(s)	Jessica Rollie	31	Rochester	3:04:59
2016	3rd place, bronze medalist(s)	Jim Onigkeit	48	Rochester	2:51:09	2016	3rd place, bronze medalist(s)	Shannon Smith	35	Andover	3:26:18
2015	1st place, gold medalist(s)	Jim Onigkeit	47	Rochester	2:54:29	2015	1st place, gold medalist(s)	Julie Crutchfield	34	Wilmington, Illinois	2:59:22
2015	2nd place, silver medalist(s)	Khris Vickroy	39	North Liberty, Iowa	2:56:03	2015	2nd place, silver medalist(s)	Mary Chestolowski	43	Rochester	3:04:21
2015	3rd place, bronze medalist(s)	Dustin Harford	29	St. Paul	2:59:34	2015	3rd place, bronze medalist(s)	Hannah Janus	29	Mt. Horeb, Wisconsin	3:16:10
2014	1st place, gold medalist(s)	Mark Evans	40	Appleton, Wisconsin	2:50:53	2014	1st place, gold medalist(s)	Mary Chestolowski	42	Rochester	3:10:11
2014	2nd place, silver medalist(s)	Gerad Mead	34	Minneapolis	2:56:14	2014	2nd place, silver medalist(s)	Sara Veith	19	River Falls, Wisconsin	3:22:58
2014	3rd place, bronze medalist(s)	Peter Somers	34	Rochester	3:00:23	2014	3rd place, bronze medalist(s)	Robin Forbes-Lorman	30	Madison, Wisconsin	3:26:57
2013	1st place, gold medalist(s)	Tim Hardy	38	North Mankato	2:41:14	2013	1st place, gold medalist(s)	Hilary Farver	27	Des Moines, Iowa	3:08:58
2013	2nd place, silver medalist(s)	Luke Yoder	27	Kalona, Iowa	2:53:32	2013	2nd place, silver medalist(s)	Jenna Baker	24	Rochester	3:10:17
2013	3rd place, bronze medalist(s)	Kevin Bence	24	Waukesha, Wisconsin	2:55:34	2013	3rd place, bronze medalist(s)	Megan Stelljes	28	Madison, Wisconsin	3:13:51
2012	1st place, gold medalist(s)	Pete Gilman	37	Rochester	2:30:21	2012	1st place, gold medalist(s)	Serene Griffin	42	Roanoke, Texas	3:20:19
2012	2nd place, silver medalist(s)	Robert Mitchell	33	Rochester	2:55:18	2012	2nd place, silver medalist(s)	Danielle Arant	25	Rochester	3:22:54
2012	3rd place, bronze medalist(s)	Kevin Bence	24	Waukesha, Wisconsin	2:55:34	2012	3rd place, bronze medalist(s)	Karen Plucinski	49	Carl Junction, Missouri	3:24:28
2011	1st place, gold medalist(s)	Ron Giles	42	Rochester	2:44:41	2011	1st place, gold medalist(s)	Deborah Hudleston	31	Minneapolis	3:01:41
2011	2nd place, silver medalist(s)	Benjamin Kopecky	21	North Liberty, Iowa	2:49:03	2011	2nd place, silver medalist(s)	Kari Brown	33	Garfield	3:13:10
2011	3rd place, bronze medalist(s)	Forrest Tracy	31	St. Paul	2:49:35	2011	3rd place, bronze medalist(s)	Jessica Brakora	29	Madison, Wisconsin	3:23:31
2010	1st place, gold medalist(s)	Pete Gilman	35	Rochester	2:35:31	2010	1st place, gold medalist(s)	Amy Vantassel	34	Colorado Springs, Colorado	3:32:48
2010	2nd place, silver medalist(s)	Gary Krugger	25	Edinboro, Pennsylvania	3:03:02	2010	2nd place, silver medalist(s)	Dawn Boynton	34	Rochester	3:42:08
2010	3rd place, bronze medalist(s)	Jason Sinwell	32	Rochester	3:03:23	2010	3rd place, bronze medalist(s)	Holly Grimsrud	25	Lakeville	3:43:44
2009	1st place, gold medalist(s)	Chuck Engle	38	Dublin, Ohio	2:39:14	2009	1st place, gold medalist(s)	Heather Himler	34	Rochester	2:57:39
2009	2nd place, silver medalist(s)	Scott Haugh	40	St. Paul	2:43:46	2009	2nd place, silver medalist(s)	Katie Kramer	29	Broken Arrow, Oklahoma	3:25:04
2009	3rd place, bronze medalist(s)	Ron Giles	40	Rochester	2:44:30	2009	3rd place, bronze medalist(s)	Teri Pruszynski	34	Rochester	3:33:32
2008	1st place, gold medalist(s)	Mark Ott	35	Jackson, Michigan	2:54:33	2008	1st place, gold medalist(s)	Kara Arzamendia	30	St. Paul	3:12:19
2008	2nd place, silver medalist(s)	Ron Giles	39	Rochester	2:58:46	2008	2nd place, silver medalist(s)	Erika Sperl-Imhoff	18	Rochester	3:20:53
2008	3rd place, bronze medalist(s)	Steven Weigand		Rochester	2:58:58	2008	3rd place, bronze medalist(s)	Jen Block	38	Rochester	3:27:30
2007	1st place, gold medalist(s)	Nick Payne	37	Rochester	2:41:15	2007	1st place, gold medalist(s)	Tammy Berg-Beniak	39	Mazeppa	3:14:10
2007	2nd place, silver medalist(s)	Brett Evans	36	St. Paul	2:47:45	2007	2nd place, silver medalist(s)	Jennifer Halverson	31	West St. Paul	3:22:04
2007	3rd place, bronze medalist(s)	Steve Hanke	26	Rochester	2:51:40	2007	3rd place, bronze medalist(s)	Kris Anderson	31	Mankato	3:24:15
2006*	1st place, gold medalist(s)	Brett Evans	35	St. Paul	2:56:43	2006*	1st place, gold medalist(s)	Kathy Waldron	47	Green Bay, Wisconsin	3:30:44
2006*	2nd place, silver medalist(s)	Cameron Berg	23	Palo Alto, California	2:57:15	2006*	2nd place, silver medalist(s)	Marilee Hardyman	41	Rochester	3:36:42
2006*	3rd place, bronze medalist(s)	Jeff Miller	35	Minneapolis	3:22:19	2006*	3rd place, bronze medalist(s)	Gretchen Sadaka	35	Rochester	3:36:49
2005	1st place, gold medalist(s)	Pete Gilman	30	Rochester	2:25:54	2005	1st place, gold medalist(s)	Ann Marie Thiessen	34	Tacoma, Washington	3:04:46
2005	2nd place, silver medalist(s)	Aaron Nodolf	26	West Allis, Wisconsin	2:44:16	2005	2nd place, silver medalist(s)	Deb Thomford	47	Zumbrota	3:24:49
2005	3rd place, bronze medalist(s)	Nick Payne	35	Rochester	2:45:39	2005	3rd place, bronze medalist(s)	Kristi Walsh	25	Rochester	3:35:37
2004	1st place, gold medalist(s)	Patrick Russell	28	Duluth	2:36:58	2004	1st place, gold medalist(s)	Deb Thomford	46	Zumbrota	3:26:40
2004	2nd place, silver medalist(s)	John Reich	35	Rochester	2:43:27	2004	2nd place, silver medalist(s)	Gretchen Sadaka	33	Mankato	3:34:46
2004	3rd place, bronze medalist(s)	Derek Dippon	31	Cedar	2:45:33	2004	3rd place, bronze medalist(s)	Kim Kolbeck	24	Rochester	3:35:46
2003	1st place, gold medalist(s)	Brett Evans	32	West St. Paul	2:43:06	2003	1st place, gold medalist(s)	Benita Glassford	32	Lake Mills, Iowa	3:13:59
2003	2nd place, silver medalist(s)	Andy Prevost	25	Cloquet	2:44:23	2003	2nd place, silver medalist(s)	Patty Langum	42	Brooklyn Park	3:14:19
2003	3rd place, bronze medalist(s)	Gregory Lindusky	44	Cottage Grove	2:55:27	2003	3rd place, bronze medalist(s)	Teri Pruszynski	28	Rochester	3:33:18
2002	1st place, gold medalist(s)	Pete Gilman	27	Byron	2:30:06	2002	1st place, gold medalist(s)	Kathy Neises	31	Madison, South Dakota	2:56:31
2002	2nd place, silver medalist(s)	Daniel Deuhs	31	St. Paul	2:38:33	2002	2nd place, silver medalist(s)	Kathy Waldron	43	Green Bay, Wisconsin	3:01:45
2002	3rd place, bronze medalist(s)	David Audet	37	Concord, New Hampshire	2:51:45	2002	3rd place, bronze medalist(s)	Joyce Bourassa	34	Lakeville	3:04:59
2001	1st place, gold medalist(s)	Jerry Wille	44	Rochester	2:46:28	2001	1st place, gold medalist(s)	Kathy Waldron	42	Green Bay, Wisconsin	2:57:15
2001	2nd place, silver medalist(s)	Andy Prevost	23	Cloquet	2:46:42	2001	2nd place, silver medalist(s)	Deb Thomford	43	Zumbrota	3:17:04
2001	3rd place, bronze medalist(s)	Jeffery Miller	36	Albert Lea	2:51:55	2001	3rd place, bronze medalist(s)	Karla Behringer	43	Rochester	3:17:10
2000	1st place, gold medalist(s)	Bill Field	38	Faribault	2:33:07	2000	1st place, gold medalist(s)	Kathy Waldron	41	Green Bay, Wisconsin	3:02:13
2000	2nd place, silver medalist(s)	Jerry Wille	43	Rochester	2:40:08	2000	2nd place, silver medalist(s)	Heather Gilbertson	28	Eagan	3:11:32
2000	3rd place, bronze medalist(s)	Jeffery Miller	35	Albert Lea	2:42:04	2000	3rd place, bronze medalist(s)	Jean Herbert	43	Albuquerque, New Mexico	3:14:32
1999	1st place, gold medalist(s)	Terry Tupy	29	Rochester	2:51:09	1999	1st place, gold medalist(s)	Kathy Waldron	40	Green Bay, Wisconsin	2:59:28
1999	2nd place, silver medalist(s)	Bill Suffrins	35	Rochester	2:53:34	1999	2nd place, silver medalist(s)	Karen Asphaug	43	Hastings	3:13:55
1999	3rd place, bronze medalist(s)	Jeff Allen	32	Rochester	2:56:38	1999	3rd place, bronze medalist(s)	Deb Thomford	41	Zumbrota	3:29:18
1998	1st place, gold medalist(s)	Jerry Wille	41	Rochester	2:47:50	1998	1st place, gold medalist(s)	Kathy Mathieson	39	Green Bay, Wisconsin	3:03:28
1998	2nd place, silver medalist(s)	Darren Ruschy	34	Minneapolis	2:48:18	1998	2nd place, silver medalist(s)	Jean Herbert	42	Albuquerque, New Mexico	3:14:16
1998	3rd place, bronze medalist(s)	Roy O'Sullivan	30	Kalona, Iowa	2:50:27	1998	3rd place, bronze medalist(s)	Kathleen Eikens	35	Minneapolis	3:14:33
1997	1st place, gold medalist(s)	Dan Frusher	27	Rochester	2:29:40	1997	1st place, gold medalist(s)	Benita Amundson	26	Rochester	3:07:44
1997	2nd place, silver medalist(s)	Jeffrey Miller	32	Albert Lea	2:43:46	1997	2nd place, silver medalist(s)	Shelly Davis	37	Wadena	3:15:27
1997	3rd place, bronze medalist(s)	James Hannon	38	Rochester	2:47:35	1997	3rd place, bronze medalist(s)	Cynthia Wilkowske	31	Minneapolis	3:17:55
1996	1st place, gold medalist(s)	Todd Sperling	36	Goodhue	2:35:16	1996	1st place, gold medalist(s)	Paulette Dow	30	St. Paul	3:06:42
1996	2nd place, silver medalist(s)	Terry Gendron	36	Moline, Illinois	2:36:25	1996	2nd place, silver medalist(s)	Benita Amundson	25	Marinette, Wisconsin	3:09:56
1996	3rd place, bronze medalist(s)	Brad Kautz	38	Rochester	2:42:29	1996	3rd place, bronze medalist(s)	Kathleen Crozier	19	Minneapolis	3:13:51

* Due to hot weather, race official called runners off the course. The race was officially canceled after 3 hours, though results were listed through 4 hours and 30 minutes.

** A "virtual" race was scheduled.
