= Boniface Kongin =

Kenyan marathon runner

Personal information
- Born: March 16, 1990 (age 36) Iten, Kenya

Sport
- Country: Kenya
- Sport: Track and field

Boniface Kongin is a marathon runner from Iten, Kenya. Born March 16, 1990, Kongin grew up in an era that saw distance running records continually set by runners from Kenya and Ethiopia. He became a strong distance runner and placed high in several marathons before taking first place in the Pittsburgh Marathon in 2019. He then ran Grandma's Marathon in June and beat out four-time champion Elisha Barno and course record holder Dominic Ondoro while finishing with a time of 2:11:56. Then he proceeded to finish first in the Montreal Marathon in 2:15:18.

Year	Competition	Venue	Position	Time
Representing Kenya
2014	Yorkshire Marathon	York, England	1st	2:13:59
2016	London Marathon	London, England	DNF	
2017	Twin Cities Marathon	St. Paul, Minnesota, United States	4th	2:15:08
2017	Philadelphia Marathon	Philadelphia, United States	1st	2:16:25
2018	Twin Cities Marathon	St. Paul, Minnesota, United States	2nd	2:12:12
2019	Pittsburgh Marathon	Pittsburgh, United States	1st	2:10:34
2019	Grandma's Marathon	Duluth, United States	1st	2:11:56
2019	Montreal Marathon	Montreal, Canada	1st	2:15:18
2020	Los Angeles Marathon	Los Angeles, United States	DNF	

== Personal bests ==
Marathon: 2:10:34 (2019 Pittsburgh Marathon USA) Half-marathon: 1:02:02 (2014) 10K Road: 29:25 (2013) 10 Miles: 48:27 (2017)
