= Kwemoi =

Kwemoi is a surname of East African origin given by the Kalenjin people that may refer to:

- Robert Kwemoi Chemosin (born 1989), Kenyan half marathon runner
- Ronald Kwemoi (born 1995), Kenyan long-distance runner

== See also ==
- Kipkemoi, a similar Kenyan name
- Kemboi, a similar Kenyan name
