= Kemei =

Kemei is a name of Kenyan origin meaning dry season in Kalenjin that may refer to:

- William Kemei (born 1969), Kenyan middle-distance runner and 1991 All-Africa Games champion
- Philemon Kemei Cheruiyot (born 1982), Kenyan long-distance runner and 2004 Lisbon Marathon winner

== See also ==
- Kipkemei, related Kenyan name meaning "son of Kemei"
