= Kembo =

Kembo is a given name and a surname. Notable people with the name include:

== Surname ==
- Jirès Kembo Ekoko (born 1988), professional footballer
- Kembo Uba Kembo (1947–2007), Congolese football midfielder
- Paul Kipkosgei Kembo (born 1990), Turkish long-distance runner of Kenyan origin
- Richard Kembo, Papua New Guinea rugby league footballer
- Yann Kembo (born 2002), French professional footballer

== Given name ==
- Kembo Diliwidi (born 2006), French footballer
- Kembo Kibato (born 2000), Canadian professional soccer player
- Kembo Mohadi (born 1949), former vice-president of Zimbabwe

== See also ==
- Kamba (disambiguation)
- Kambi (disambiguation)
- Kemba (disambiguation)
- Kemboi, surname page
