= Bazu Worku =

Ethiopian long-distance runner

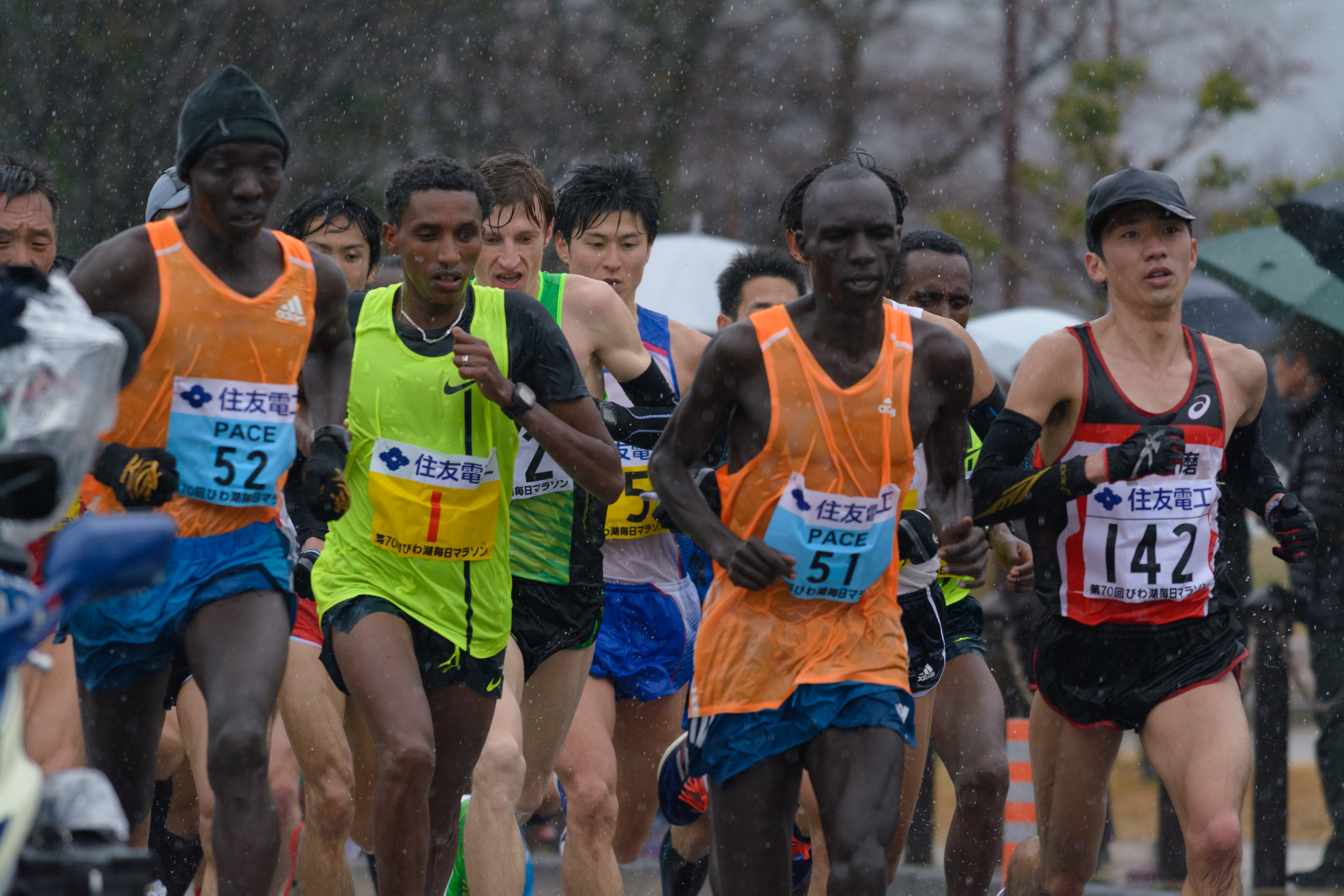
- Bazu Worku (#1) at the 2015 Lake Biwa Marathon

Personal information
- Born: 15 September 1990 (age 35) Mekelle, Ethiopia

Sport
- Country: Ethiopia

Bazu Worku (born 15 September 1990) is a long-distance runner from Ethiopia who competes in marathon races.

Worku made his first appearances on the road running circuit in 2008: he was third in the 15 km race at the Istanbul Eurasia Marathon in October, and registered a personal best at the Delhi Half Marathon. He improved his half marathon best at the Paris Half Marathon in March 2009, winning the race in a time of 1:01:56.

On 5 April 2009 at the Paris Marathon, Worku ran his debut marathon in 2:06:15 to finish as runner-up to Vincent Kipruto of Kenya. This was the fastest time ever run for an 18-year-old over the distance. Worku ran at the Ottawa Marathon in May 2010 and placed third, twenty seconds adrift of winner Arata Fujiwara. He improved his personal best time at the 2010 Berlin Marathon, running 2:05:25 to take third place. He ran at the national 30 km championships but was beaten into second place by Azmeraw Bekele. He was selected for the World Championship Marathon in 2011 but failed to finish the race.

He ran at three high-profile marathons in 2012. He ran a season's best of 2:07:48 at the Dubai Marathon and also entered the 2012 London Marathon, but did not make the top ten in either race. He was runner-up at the Chinese Lanzhou Marathon then managed fifth at the Frankfurt Marathon. He began 2013 with wins at the Houston Marathon and Grandma's Marathon in the United States. He was close to third victory at the Eindhoven Marathon, but was beaten to the top spot by Yemane Tsegay.

Worku won the 2018 Houston Marathon in 2:08:30, one minute ahead of second-place finisher (and training partner) Yitayal Atnafu, who was followed closely by Elisha Barno. Worku won $45,000 for the first-place finish.

== Personal bests ==
Event	Time (h:m:s)	Venue	Date
10 km	28:21	New Delhi, India	9 Nov 2008
Half marathon	1:01:56	Paris, France	8 Mar 2009
Marathon	2:05:25	Berlin, Germany	26 Sep 2010

- All information taken from IAAF profile.
