= National Marathon to Finish Breast Cancer =

Charity marathon in Florida

Breast Cancer Marathon - DONNA
- Formation: 2003
- Headquarters: Florida
- Founder: Donna Deegan
- Website: https://breastcancermarathon.com/donna-marathon-weekend/

The National Marathon to Finish Breast Cancer, also known as the Breast Cancer Marathon, DONNA Marathon Weekend, and the 26.2 with Donna, is an annual marathon sporting event held in Jacksonville Beach, Florida. It was first held on February 17, 2008.

== About ==
=== The Course ===
The Donna Marathon is part of a three day event. The marathon is 26.2 miles and starts at the Beaches Town Center at Neptune Beach, Fl. The course weaves throughout the historic coastline along A1A, over the Intracoastal Waterway Bridge, and then finishes at the Mayo Clinic. Cut off time is 7 hours, which means that runners must finish within 7-hours.

The Breast Cancer Marathon is an official Boston Marathon qualifier race.

=== Winners ===
==== 2015 Winners ====
- Elisha Barno won the race in 2015 with a time of 2:13:19, netting the $10,000 prize.

==== 2022 Winners ====
- Ultra 110 Marathon Winner is Dawn Lisenby of Flagler Beach, Fla. (26:10:42)
- Men’s Marathon Winner is Christopher McCaffrey of Jacksonville, Fla. (2:35:39)*
- Women’s Marathon Winner is Meaghan Murray of Baltimore, Md. (2:54:32)*
- Men’s Half Marathon Winner is Derek Byrnes of Jacksonville, Fla. (1:14:18)
- Women’s Half Marathon Winner is Kristen Dixon of Jacksonville Beach, Fla. (1:21:48)
- Survivor Marathon Winner is Katie Rose of Lexington, S.C. (3:24:45)*
- Survivor Half Marathon Winner is Nicole Krewson of Knoxville, Tenn. (1:44:34)
- Adaptive Athlete Marathon Winner is Richard Solze of Lake Butler, Fla. (2:12:14)
- Adaptive Athlete Half Marathon Winner is Sarah Williford of Jacksonville, Fla. (2:28:45)*

==== 2023 Winners ====
- Virtual Women's Marathon Winner is Ixiim Flores of Saint Augustine, Fla. (4:15:16)
- Virtual Men's Marathon Winner is Sam Greg of Tallahassee, Fla. (4:19:01)
- Virtual Men's Half Marathon Winner is John Tomaro of Albany, Ca (1:34:58)
- Virtual Women's Half Marathon Winner is Jody Dolan-Aldrich of Jacksonville, Fla. (1:53:36)
- Virtual Women's 5k Winner is Nowelle Altman Sigman of Bowling Green, KY. (22:57)
- Virtual Men's 5k Winner is Jeremy Miller of Galena, IL (27:01)
