= Wesley Ngetich Kimutai =

Kenyan long-distance runner (1977–2008)

Wesley Ngetich Kimutai (December 15, 1977 – January 21, 2008) was a Kenyan marathon runner.

He was born in 1977 in Kiribwet, Kirindoni division, Trans Mara District. He went to Olpopongi Primary School, but did not go to high school, since his parents could not afford to pay his school fees. He did not compete outside of Kenya until 2003. He finished 5th at the 2004 Nairobi Marathon, timing 2:15:15 hours.

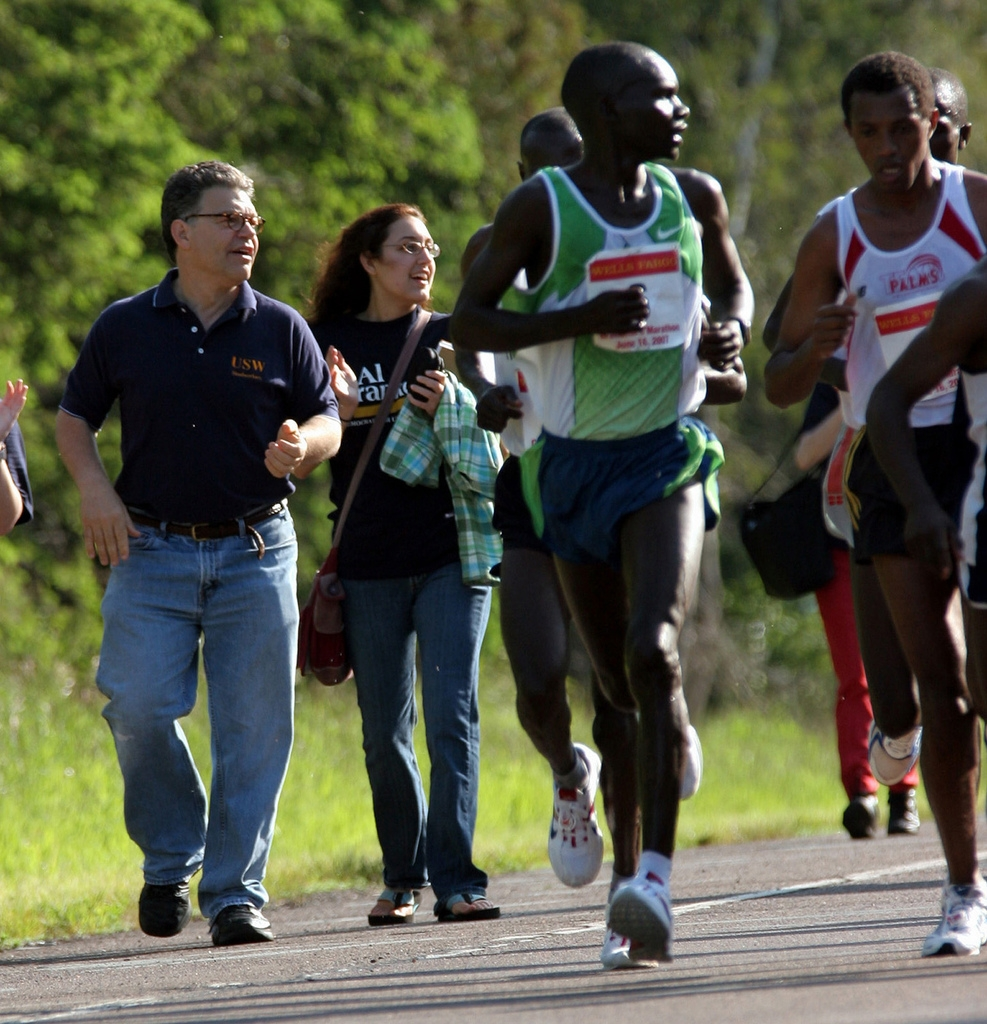
Ngetich (center in green) at the 2007 Grandma's Marathon (then Senate candidate Al Franken at left)

He won the Grandma's Marathon in Duluth, Minnesota, in 2005 and 2007. Ngetich set his personal best of 2:12:10 hours when he finished second at the Houston Marathon in 2006. Post-election violence in his home country forced him and 13 other runners to drop out of the January 2008 Rock 'n' Roll Arizona Marathon in Phoenix, Arizona.

Ngetich died after he was shot with a poisoned arrow on January 21, 2008, in Emarti, Trans Mara District, becoming the second international athlete to lose his life, after Lucas Sang, due to political clashes. Ngetich is survived by two wives and three children. He was buried in his home village of Kiribwet.

== Achievements ==
- All results are from marathons, unless stated otherwise

Year	Competition	Venue	Position	Notes
Representing Kenya
2005	Grandma's Marathon	Duluth, Minnesota, United States	1st	2:13:18
2006	Houston Marathon	Houston, Texas, United States	2nd	2:12:10
2007	Grandma's Marathon	Duluth, Minnesota, United States	1st	2:15:55
