= Yorkshire Marathon =

Annual race in the United Kingdom held since 2013

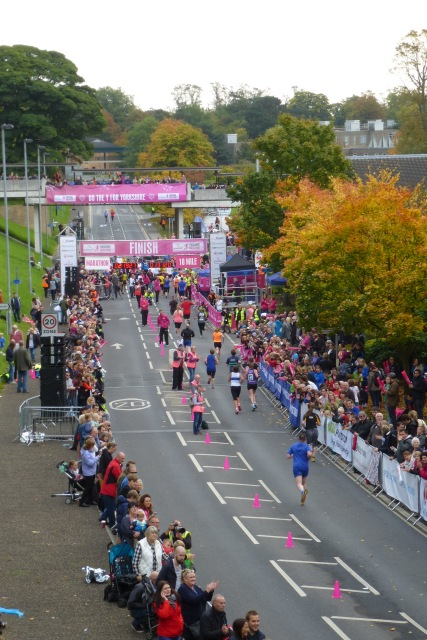
- Runners finishing the Yorkshire Marathon in 2015
- Date: 20 October 2024
- Location: York, England
- Event type: Road
- Distance: Marathon
- Established: 2013 (13 years ago)
- Website: Yorkshire Marathon

The Yorkshire Marathon, sponsored by the Asda Foundation, is an annual marathon road running event held in York, England in October, first held in 2013, and organised by Run For All Events.

== History ==
In the inaugural running of the event on 20 October 2013, over 3,800 runners finished the event. Hour-long race highlights produced by Dream Team Television were broadcast two weeks later by Channel 4 and were subsequently shown by other sports channels including Sky Sports, BT Sport, British Eurosport and Premier Sports.

The 2020 edition of the race was postponed to 2021 due to the coronavirus pandemic, with all entries automatically transferred to 2021.

== Course ==
External image
- Course map of full marathon in 2021

The course starts the University of York and continues around the City Centre and past York Minster before heading out on the Vale of York and then returning to the finish at the university.

== Winners ==
Key: Course record

Ed.	Year	Men's winner	Time	Women's winner	Time	Rf.
1	2013	Edwin Korir (KEN)	2:13:31	Helen Koskei (KEN)	2:40:10	
2	2014	Boniface Kongin (KEN)	2:13:59	Shona Fletcher (SCO)	2:43:40	
3	2015	Edwin Korir (KEN)	2:15:06	Joasia Zakrzewski (SCO)	2:48:48	
4	2016	Paul Martelletti (ENG)	2:19:36	Sarah Lowery (ENG)	2:45:53	
5	2017	Ross Houston (SCO)	2:24:13	Tracy Millmore (ENG)	2:46:09	
6	2018	Paul Martelletti (ENG)	2:27:02	Katherine Wood (ENG)	2:41:35	
7	2019	Mark Buckingham (ENG)	2:21:42	Charlene Jacobs-Conradie (ENG)	2:46:50	
	2020	postponed due to coronavirus pandemic				
8	2021	Tom Charles (ENG)	2:24:22	Becky Penty (ENG)	2:47:46	
9	2022	Benard Bosuben (KEN)	2:22:56	Samantha Antell (ENG)	2:54:21	
10	2023	Joe Sagar (ENG)	2:24:10	Melissah Gibson (AUS)	2:40:41	

Wheelchair race

Ed.	Year	Winner	Time	Rf.
1	2013	Christopher Nash (ENG)	3:00:49	
2	2014	Bret Crossley (ENG)	2:11:10	
3	2015	Bret Crossley (ENG)	1:48:30	
4	2016	Calum Hall (ENG)	2:01:35	
5	2017	Bret Crossley (ENG)	1:45:16	
6	2018	Christopher Nash (ENG)	2:15:12	
7	2019	Bret Crossley (ENG)	1:58:20	
	2020	postponed due to coronavirus pandemic		
8	2021	Bret Crossley (ENG)	1:56:02	
9	2022	No finishers		
10	2023	Callum Hall (ENG)	1:55:02	
