= Dominic Ondoro =

Kenyan long-distance runner

Personal information
- Nationality: Kenyan
- Born: Dominic Pius Ondoro; March 3, 1988 (age 38)

Sport
- Country: Kenya
- Sport: Athletics
- Event: Marathon
- Coached by: Yobes Ondieki

Achievements and titles
- Personal best(s): 8,000: 22:33 10,000 m: 28:04; 12,000 m: 35:41; 10 mile: 47:05; Half marathon: 1:01:45 Marathon: 2:08:00

Dominic Ondoro (born March 3, 1988, also known as Pius Dominic Ondoro) is a Kenyan long-distance runner best known for holding the course records at Minnesota's Grandma's Marathon and the Twin Cities Marathon. He has won many other major marathons, some multiple times, such as the 2017 and 2023 Houston Marathon in Texas, his two Melbourne Marathon wins in Australia and his unrivaled four Twin Cities Marathon wins in Minneapolis-St. Paul.

== Running career ==
At the IAAF-labeled Houston Marathon in 2017, Ondoro ran most of the race with a large group that included Ethiopian Olympians Yitayal Atnafu and Abayneh Ayele. The race had been won by Ethiopians in the previous eight years, but Ondoro sped up in the last two miles to win the race in 2:12:05.

Ondoro finished second at the Stockholm Marathon in 2011 in 2:14:23. The same year, he won the Helsinki City Marathon at age 23. He finished in 2:23:24. In 2012, he finished ninth in the Mumbai Marathon in 2:14:56.

Later in 2012, Ondoro raced the Great Bristol Half Marathon, winning the competitive race in 1:02:51.

His personal best time in a marathon was at the Tiberias Marathon in 2013. The race takes place near the Sea of Galilee in Israel. Ondoro was crowned the victor after he finished just seconds ahead of Deribe Melka and Francis Kibiwott Larabal and crossed the finish line in 2:08:00.

In 2013, at the Lille Half Marathon in Lille, France, Ondoro finished sixth in his best-ever half marathon race, coming in at 1:01:32, a few seconds behind Abraham Cheroben.

In 2014, he became the new course record holder at Grandma's Marathon, which runs from Two Harbors to Duluth, Minnesota, by winning in a time of 2:09:06. The former record was held for 33 years by Dick Beardsley (former winner of the London Marathon). "I've been honored to hold the record for that long, but now it's time to pass it on," Beardsley said after being one of the first people to congratulate Ondoro for his victory.

He returned in 2015 and finished in 2:11:17. It was enough for second place, behind his training partner Elisha Barno, who won in 2:10:38.

Ondoro won the Melbourne Marathon in back-to-back years: 2013 and 2014.

In 2015, he beat out 40,000 other runners to win the Cooper River Bridge Run, a 10K run in South Carolina that is the fifth-largest road race in the United States. With a strong headwind, he finished first in 29:22. In 2016, against 36,000 competitors, he won again, finishing in 29:00. The prize each year was $10,000.

In 2016 and 2017, he was the back-to-back champion of the Azalea Trail Run in Mobile, Alabama (a 10K run) with times of 28:25 and 28:04, respectively.

In May 2016, Ondoro finished third at the Ottawa Marathon in 2:11:39 behind Ethiopians Dino Sefir and Shura Kitata.

Ondoro broke another longstanding course record in 2016 at the Twin Cities Marathon. Phil Coppess had set the record in 1985, when he ran the course in 2:10:05, one of the fastest American marathons of all time. The record stood for 31 years. But in the late October morning, Ondoro outran his competition and finished in 2:08:51, taking home $35,000. It was the fastest marathon ever run in Minnesota. Both he and second-place winner Elisha Barno ran faster than the winning time at the 2016 Chicago Marathon.

The record-breaking year wasn't the first or last time he would break the tape in the Midwestern race. Ondoro has won the Twin Cities race, which runs from Minneapolis, Minnesota, to St. Paul, four times: 2015, 2016, 2017, and 2019. He didn't compete in 2018.

He won the 2022 Grandma's Marathon in near course-record time. On November 20, 2022, in the cold and wind, he won the Philadelphia Marathon.

He started 2023 by winning the Houston Marathon.

He won the 2026 Miami Marathon.

== Early and personal life ==
Ondoro was born in Kenya and lives in Uasin Gishu County, where many elite marathoners train. He and Elisha Barno, another elite marathon runner, train together in Eldoret, Kenya, and Santa Fe, New Mexico. They have been coached by Kenyan World Championship gold medalist Yobes Ondieki. In 2016, they were represented by agent Scott Robinson. Barno and Ondoro are good friends and both own home construction companies in Kenya. Ondoro has three children.

== Achievements ==
Year	Competition	Venue	Position	Event	Notes
2011	Helsinki City Marathon	Helsinki, Finland	1st	Marathon	2:23:24
2012	Great Bristol Half Marathon	Bristol, England	1st	Half Marathon	1:02:51
2013	Tiberias Marathon	Tiberias, Israel	1st	Marathon	2:08:00
2013	Pedestres d'Arras 10K	Arras, France	1st	10K	28:26
2013	Melbourne Marathon	Melbourne, Australia	1st	Marathon	2:10:47
2014	Grandma's Marathon	Duluth, Minnesota	1st	Marathon	2:09:06
2014	Melbourne Marathon	Melbourne, Australia	1st	Marathon	2:11:30
2015	Cooper River Bridge Run	Charleston, South Carolina	1st	10K	29:22
2015	Twin Cities Marathon	Minneapolis–Saint Paul, Minnesota	1st	Marathon	2:11:16
2016	Azalea Trail Run	Mobile, Alabama	1st	10K	28:25
2016	Cooper River Bridge Run	Charleston, South Carolina	1st	10K	29:00
2016	Twin Cities Marathon	Minneapolis–Saint Paul, Minnesota	1st	Marathon	2:08:51
2017	Houston Marathon	Houston, Texas	1st	Marathon	2:12:05
2017	Azalea Trail Run	Mobile, Alabama	1st	10K	28:04
2017	Twin Cities Marathon	Minneapolis–Saint Paul, Minnesota	1st	Marathon	2:11:54
2019	Twin Cities Marathon	Minneapolis–Saint Paul, Minnesota	1st	Marathon	2:12:24
2022	Grandma's Marathon	Duluth, Minnesota	1st	Marathon	2:09:34
2022	Philadelphia Marathon	Philadelphia, Pennsylvania	1st	Marathon	2:14:20
2023	Houston Marathon	Houston, Texas	1st	Marathon	2:10:36
2026	Miami Marathon	Miami, Florida	1st	Marathon	2:17:48
