= Vladimir Tyamchik =

Belarusian marathon runner

Vladimir Tyamchik (also known as Vladzimir Tsiamchyk or Uladzimir Tzaimchyk, born Dec. 14, 1973) is a Belarusian long-distance and middle-distance runner who was the 1999 national champion in the 10,000 meters. He was also represented his nation at four IAAF Half Marathon World Championships and one European Cross Championship race.

In 2002, Tyamchik ran his fastest marathon: a 2:11:38 at the Eindhoven Marathon. In 2004, Tyamchik ran the 28th annual Grandma's Marathon from Two Harbors, Minnesota to Duluth and, while facing a strong headwind, beat Kenyan Luke Metto in the last six miles to win. Tyamchik took home $7,500 for the victory.

In 2005, Tyamchik was third in the Tokyo Marathon. In 2006, he was racing the Kosice Marathon in Slovakia and came in second.
