= Berhanu Girma =

Ethiopian long-distance runner

Berhanu Girma Degefa (born 22 November 1986) is an Ethiopian long-distance runner who competes in road running events for Canada. His personal best for the marathon is 2:06:09 hours and he was the 2012 winner of Grandma's Marathon.

Berhanu made his debut over the marathon distance in 2009, competing at the Casablanca Marathon and finishing fifth with a time of 2:15:57 hours. His next outing at the 2010 Valencia Marathon saw a three-minute improvement to 2:12:51 hours. He was also fifth at the Košice Peace Marathon that year. He fared less well in 2011, coming 19th at the Prague Marathon and 13th at the Twin Cities Marathon, barely managing to dip under two hours and twenty minutes that year.

Berhanu was only 20th at the 2012 Marrakech Marathon but later set personal bests in the half marathon (61:54 minutes in Barcelona) the marathon, the latter in a winning time of 2:12:25 hours at Grandma's Marathon. He set a 10K run best of 28:46 minutes at the Corrida de Langueux, where he was eighth. He was also the runner-up at that year's Twin Cities Marathon.

He was further down the rankings in his first two marathons of 2013, coming 14th at the Tiberias Marathon and eighth at the Chongqing Marathon, but he made a surprise breakthrough at the Amsterdam Marathon with a performance of 2:06:09 hours to finish runner-up to the defending champion Wilson Chebet.

In 2019, he was the 11th finisher at the Daegu International Marathon in Daegu, South Korea. His time was 2:14:50.
