= Kipkemboi =

Kipkemboi is both a surname and a given name of Kenyan origin (Kalenjin tribe) that stems from the word/name Kemboi (which refers to night time) and the prefix Kip- (meaning "born of or born during"). Kipkemboi therefore means "born at night". It can be either male or female depending on the subtribe of the Kalenjin

Notable people with the name include:

- Kipkemboi Kimeli (1966–2010), Kenyan long-distance track runner and 1988 Olympic medallist
- Ibrahim Kipkemboi Hussein (born 1958), Kenyan marathon runner and three-time Boston Marathon champion
- John Kipkemboi Kibowen (born 1969), Kenyan long-distance runner and two-time world champion in cross country
- Richard Kipkemboi Mateelong (born 1983), Kenyan steeplechase runner and 2008 Olympic medallist
- Simeon Kipkemboi (born 1960), Kenyan sprinter
- Wilfred Kipkemboi Bungei (born 1980), Kenyan 800 metres runner and 2008 Olympic champion

The 2023 film The Wall Street Boy is also known as Kipkemboi, and centres on a protagonist with the name.

== See also ==
- Kemboi
- Kiplagat
