= Kipkemei =

Kipkemei is a name of Kenyan origin meaning "son born during dry season" that may refer to:

- Wilson Kipkemei Busienei (born 1981), Kenyan long-distance runner and three-time gold medallist at the 2005 Summer Universiade
- Richard Kipkemei Limo (born 1980), Kenyan long-distance runner and 2001 world champion
- Stephen Tum Kipkemei (born 1986), Kenyan marathon runner and two-time winner of the Marrakech Marathon

== See also ==
- Kipkemoi, similar Kenyan name
