= Athletics at the 1991 Pan American Games – Women's marathon =

Women's marathon at the Pan American Games

The women's marathon event at the 1991 Pan American Games was held in Havana, Cuba on 3 August.

== Results ==
Rank	Name	Nationality	Time	Notes
1st place, gold medalist(s)	Olga Appell	Mexico	2:43:36	
2nd place, silver medalist(s)	Maribel Durruty	Cuba	2:46:04	
3rd place, bronze medalist(s)	Emperatriz Wilson	Cuba	2:48:48	
4	Janice Ettle	United States	2:49:22	
5	Lynn DeNinno	United States	2:49:34	
6	Vilma Peña	Costa Rica	2:54:19	
7	Flora Moreno	Mexico	2:56:27	
8	María Menéndez	Guatemala	3:09:13	
9	Ana Gutiérrez	United States Virgin Islands	3:15:49	
	Yolanda Casas	Peru	DNF	
	Laura Konantz	Canada	DNS	
