= Wendy Cregg =

American long-distance runner (born 1959)

Wendy (Hovland) Cregg
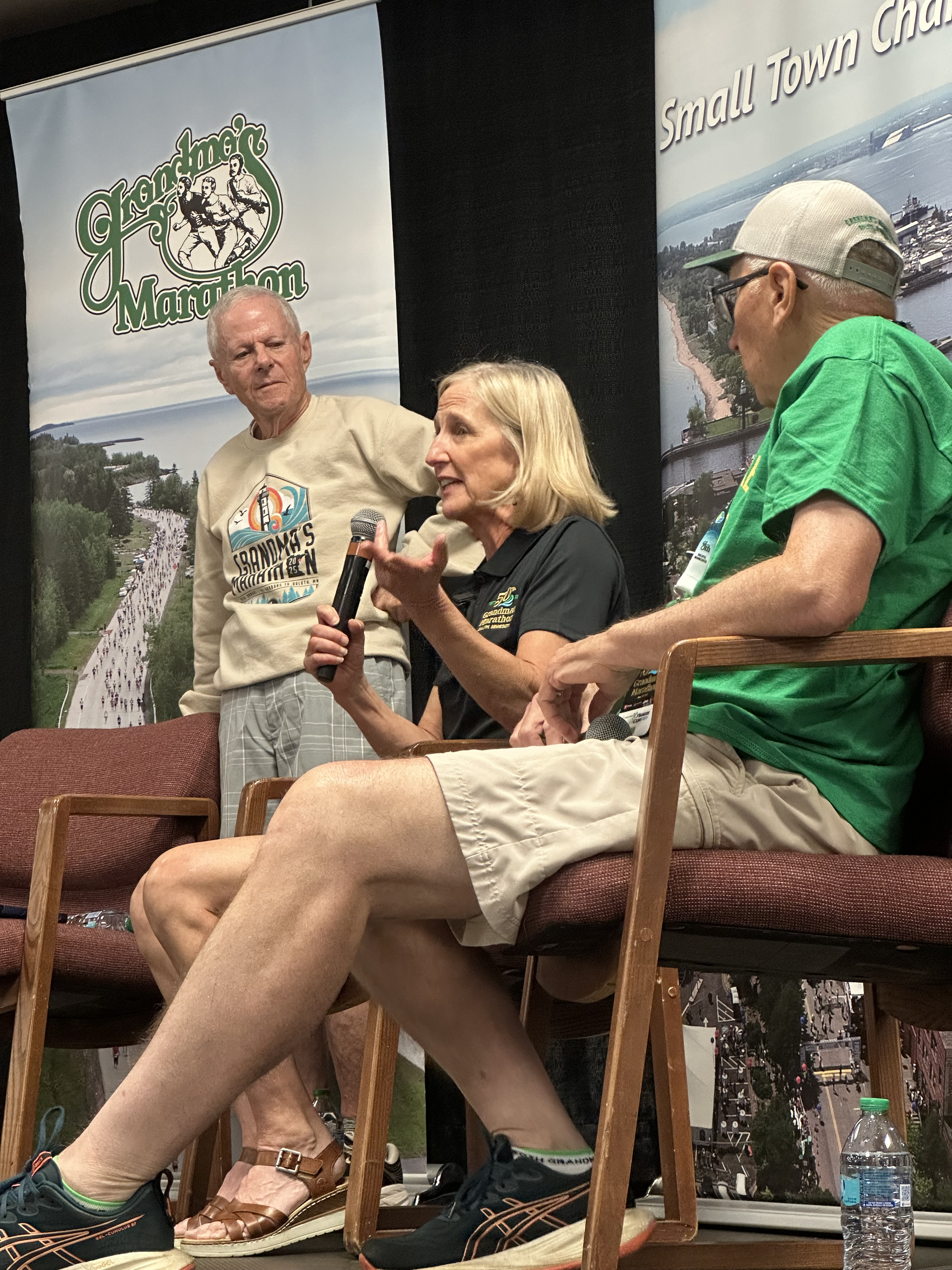
- Wendy Cregg on June 19, 2026

Personal information
- Born: Hoyt Lakes, Minnesota
- Home town: Eden Prairie, Minnesota
- Education: Aurora-Hoyt Lakes High School, University of Wisconsin-Eau Claire, Minnesota State University, Mankato

Sport
- Country: United States

Wendy Cregg (born Wendy Hovland) is an American long-distance runner. She is notable because she won the first Grandma's Marathon in 1977 and is the youngest winner of Grandma's Marathon as of 2021. Grandma's Marathon has since become the tenth largest marathon in the United States as of 2024, and is widely considered an iconic American marathon race.

== Athletic career ==
Cregg graduated from Aurora-Hoyt Lakes High School in Aurora, Minnesota, in 1976. While in high school, she did a variety of sports thanks in part due to the passage of Title IX in 1972. She ran track, where she ran the one mile and two mile. She had been a cheerleader, but decided to do swimming her senior year instead. However, the cross country running coach came to her swim practice and asked her to join the new girls' cross country team where she was one of three girls on the team. She also joined the cross country ski team during her senior year. Cregg was an original member of a running club in the Aurora-Hoyt Lakes area. Cregg decided not to run cross country at the University of Wisconsin-Eau Claire due having a stress fracture. She did however, join a recreational ski team where a lot of members were also part of the Indianhead Track Club in Eau Claire, Wisconsin.

In 1977, Cregg ran the first Grandma's Marathon and won with a time of 3:23:39. She beat 13 other women, of which only six finished. She may have first heard of Grandma's Marathon through the Indianhead Track Club or from her training partner Brian Karich. Cregg didn't follow any formal training regimen when preparing to run Grandma's, but ran frequently and participated in a variety of local races. During the time, she ran six days a week and ran 15 miles (24 km) alternated by 5 miles (8.0 km) with one day off per week. As of 2021, the 1977 Grandma's Marathon is the only marathon Cregg has run. After the race, Cregg got a call from her grandmother who scolded her for running that far saying it was bad for her health.

Also in 1977, Cregg won the Carson Park Ten Mile race held annually in Eau Claire, Wisconsin in a time of 69:14. Cregg also competed in a 24 hour race organized by the Indianhead Track Club, and was the only woman to finish the race having run an average of 6:35 per mile for 25 miles. Cregg was the fifth woman finisher of the Sawdust City Days 6 Mile run in 1977. Cregg defended her title at the Bird Lake 10 km race in Hoyt Lakes, Minnesota with a time of 40:05.

In 1978, Cregg won her age group at the Fridtjof Nansen Cross Country Ski Race in Eau Claire, Wisconsin. She was considered a favorite going into the race. She also won her age group at the 55 kilometres (34 mi) Birkebeiner ski race in 1978. Cregg won the Sawdust City Days Six Mile Race in 1978 with a time of 38:56. In 1983, Cregg was third place in her age group in the 12 miles (19 km) Earth Day Run near Blue Mountain (Montana) with a time of 1:29:54. In 1997, Cregg won her age group at the Pepsi Challenge 12 km cross country ski race in Biwabik, Minnesota, with a time of 1:35:08.

In 2019, Grandma's Marathon awarded Cregg the Scott A. Keenan Founders Award.

== Personal ==
Cregg graduated from the University of Wisconsin-Eau Claire in 1980. She works as a nurse practitioner. She earned a Master of Science in Nursing degree from Minnesota State University, Mankato in 2012. Cregg married her husband, Casey, in 1984 and lived in Missoula, Montana, for ten years before moving back to Minnesota. They have three children together.
