= Azalea Trail Run =

- Azalea Trail Run logo
- Date: late March
- Location: Mobile, Alabama (United States)
- Event type: Road
- Distance: 10 kilometers (6.2 mi)
- Established: 1978
- Course records: M: 27:26 (2001) (Kenya) Abraham Chebii; F: 31:29 (1997) (South Africa) Colleen De Reuck
- Website: www.pcpacers.org/atr/

The Azalea Trail Run is an annual road running event held in late March in Mobile, Alabama which is considered one of the United States' premier road races. Runners, walkers, and wheelchair athletes from around the world and at all levels turn out for the event. The 10-kilometer race is known for its fast, flat course along Mobile's oak shaded streets and has seen blistering records set by runners since its inception. The 2023 race will be the 45th annual running.

In 2001, Joseph Kimani of Kenya finished within two seconds of setting a new world record in the men's open division in 27:41. John Campbell of New Zealand established a world’s best time for a male masters athlete (over 50 years of age) in 1999 with his time of 31:02. In 1994, Martin Mondragon of Mexico set the current world record for men masters, at 28:56.

The two-day, family-friendly event was founded in 1978 and includes a world class 10K race, a 5K race, a fun run, and a Health and Fitness Expo. The ATR is produced by the Port City Pacers, a local nonprofit organization with the mission of promoting health and fitness through running and walking. 2,000 participants attended the 2015 race.

== Past winners ==
Key: Course record

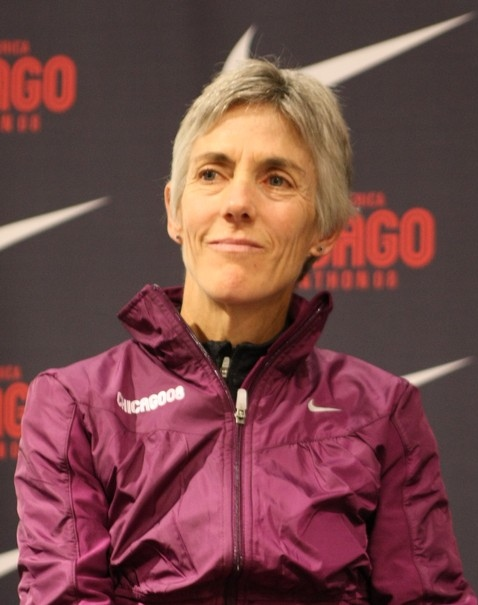
Joan Benoit was the 1984 winner of the race.

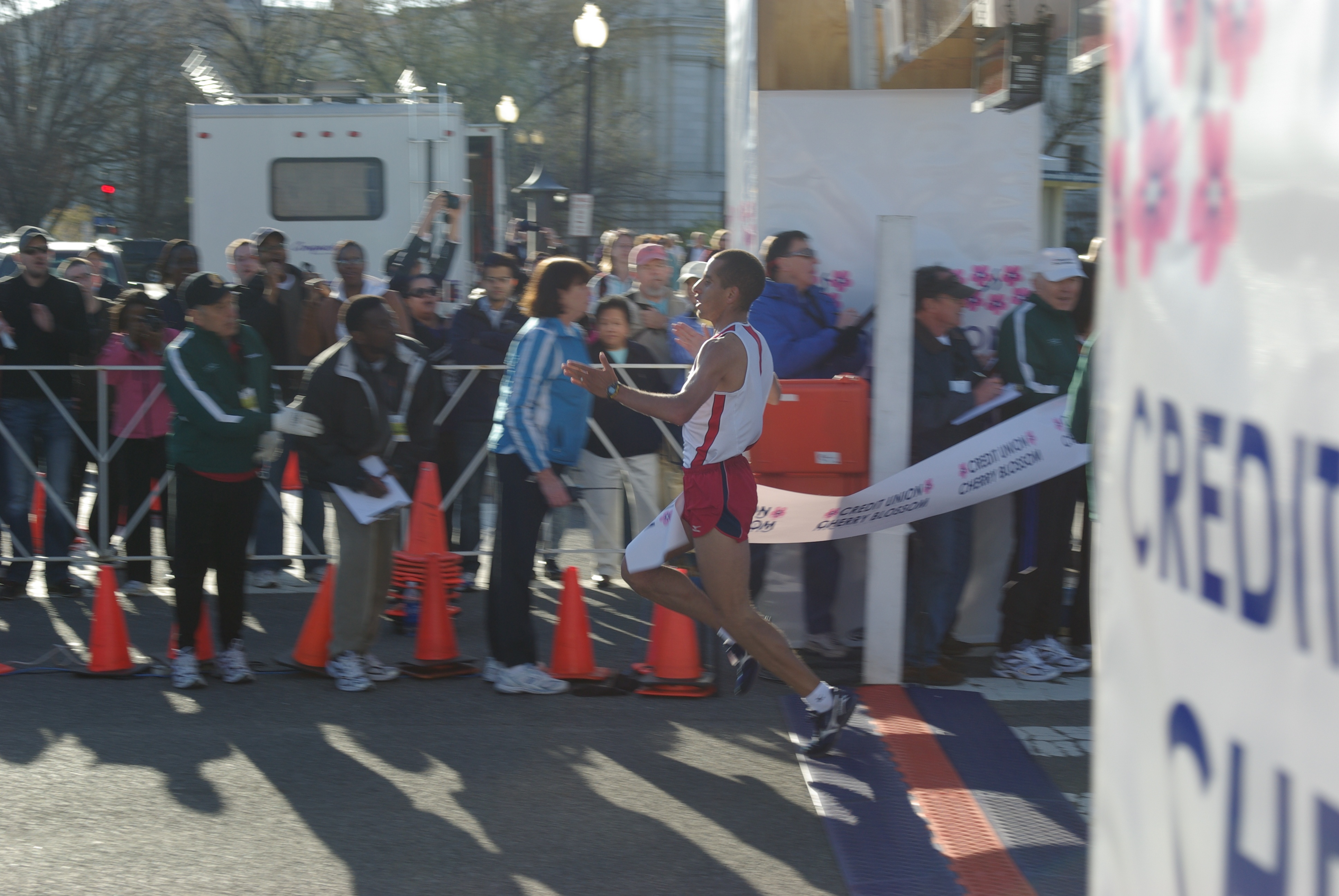
Moroccan Ridouane Harroufi won the 2009 men's race.

Edition	Year	Men's winner	Time (m:s)	Women's winner	Time (m:s)
1st	1978	Bill Rodgers (USA)	30:26	Lisa Savell (USA)	40:15
2nd	1979	Marty Liquori (USA)	30:39	Gayle Barron (USA)	37:31
3rd	1980	Ken Misner (USA)	29:34	Dolly Harrison (USA)	37:38
4th	1981	Bill Rodgers (USA)	29:01	Patti Catalano (USA)	32:32
5th	1982	Bill Rodgers (USA)	28:59	Brenda Webb (USA)	33:01
6th	1983	Bill Rodgers (USA)	28:37	Linda McLennan (USA)	33:18
7th	1984	Simon Kigen (KEN)	27:57	Joan Benoit (USA)	31:57
8th	1985	Ken Martin (USA)	28:30	Priscilla Welch (ENG)	32:14
9th	1986	Peter Koech (KEN)	28:03	Liz Lynch (SCO)	32:24
10th	1987	Paul Rugut (KEN)	28:19	Lisa Martin (AUS)	32:10
11th	1988	Mauricio González (MEX)	28:04	Teresa Ornduff (USA)	32:27
12th	1989	John Treacy (IRL)	28:17	Wendy Sly (ENG)	32:15
13th	1990	Martín Pitayo (MEX)	28:25	Francie Larrieu Smith (USA)	32:01
14th	1991	Mauricio González (MEX)	29:03	Francie Larrieu Smith (USA)	32:05
15th	1992	William Sigei (KEN)	27:45	Jill Hunter (ENG)	31:52
16th	1993	William Koech (KEN)	28:06	Wilma van Onna (NED)	32:07
17th	1994	Luketz Swartbooi (NAM)	27:51	Karolina Szabó (HUN)	32:55
18th	1995	Joseph Kimani (KEN)	27:41	Delilah Asiago (KEN)	32:07
19th	1996	Lazarus Nyakeraka (KEN)	27:44	Judi St. Hilaire (USA)	32:24
20th	1997	Joseph Kimani (KEN)	27:54	Colleen De Reuck (RSA)	31:29
21st	1998	Simon Rono (KEN)	27:55	Catherina McKiernan (IRL)	32:10
22nd	1999	Joseph Kimani (KEN)	28:01	Colleen De Reuck (RSA)	32:36
23rd	2000	Dominic Kirui (KEN)	27:49	Jane Omoro (KEN)	32:39
24th	2001	Abraham Chebii (KEN)	27:26	Gladys Asiba (KEN)	32:42
25th	2002	John Itati (KEN)	27:58	Gladys Asiba (KEN)	32:08
26th	2003	Linus Maiyo (KEN)	27:36	Edna Kiplagat (KEN)	32:12
27th	2004	John Itati (KEN)	28:55	Olga Romanova (RUS)	32:45
28th	2005	Luke Kipkosgei (KEN)	28:37	Sally Barsosio (KEN)	32:28
29th	2006	Samuel Ndereba (KEN)	28:35	Sally Barsosio (KEN)	32:19
30th	2007	Samuel Ndereba (KEN)	28:01	Rehima Kedir (ETH)	32:02
31st	2008	Moses Kigen (KEN)	28:15	Genoveva Kigen (KEN)	32:11
32nd	2009	Ridouane Harroufi (MAR)	28:14	Genoveva Kigen (KEN)	32:49
33rd	2010	John Cheruiyot (KEN)	27:59	Belaynesh Zemedkun (ETH)	32:24
34th	2011	Richard Kandie (KEN)	29:15	Janet Cherobon-Bawcom (USA)	33:22
35th	2012	Shadrack Kosgei (KEN)	28:19	Janet Cherobon-Bawcom (USA)	32:41
36th	2013	Elly Sang (KEN)	28:58	Ogla Kimaiyo (KEN)	32:33
37th	2014	Julius Kogo (KEN)	27:58	Janet Cherobon-Bawcom (USA)	32:03
38th	2015	John Muritu (KEN)	28:34	Susan Jerotich (KEN)	33:43
39th	2016	Dominic Ondoro (KEN)	28:25	Caroline Chepkoech (KEN)	31:58
40th	2017	Dominic Ondoro (KEN)	28:04	Nancy Nzisa (KEN)	32:49
41st	2018	Bernard Ngeno (KEN)	27:45	Monicah Ngige (KEN)	32:18
42nd	2019	Dominic Korir (KEN)	28:34	Paige Fisher (USA)	35:55
	2020	Not held due to COVID-19 pandemic			
43rd	2021	Zachary Anderson (USA)	32:57	Kir Selert Faraud (USA)	35:22
44th	2022	Tyler Mayforth (USA)	32:24	Kir Selert Faraud (USA)	35:24
45th	2023	Agustin Echazarreta (ARG)	34:42	Amy Lyon Echazarreta (USA)	41:29

=== Wins by country ===
Country	Men's race	Women's race	Total
Kenya	29	14	43
United States	9	18	27
England	0	3	3
Mexico	3	0	3
Ethiopia	0	2	2
Ireland	1	1	2
South Africa	0	2	2
Australia	0	1	1
Hungary	0	1	1
Namibia	1	0	1
Netherlands	0	1	1
Morocco	1	0	1
Russia	0	1	1
Scotland	0	1	1
Argentina	1	0	1
