= Kemboi =

Kemboi is a surname and given name of Kenyan origin. Notable people with the name include:

Surname:

- Amon Kemboi (born 1995), Kenyan middle- and long-distance runner
- Clement Kemboi (born 1992), Kenyan steeplechase runner
- Cornelius Kemboi (born 2000), Kenyan long-distance runner
- Edward Kemboi (born 1993), Kenyan middle-distance runner
- Edwin Kipchirchir Kemboi (born 1984), Kenyan-born Austrian long-distance runner
- Elijah Kemboi (born 1984), Kenyan marathon runner and 2011 Košice Marathon winner
- Ezekiel Kemboi (born 1982), Kenyan steeplechase runner and two-time Olympic champion
- Gladys Kemboi (born 1986), Kenyan long-distance runner
- Lawrence Kemboi (born 1993), Kenyan middle-distance runner
- Micah Kogo Kemboi (born 1986), Kenyan long-distance runner
- Nicholas Kemboi (born 1983), Kenyan long-distance runner competing for Qatar
- Nicholas Kemboi (born 1989), Kenyan middle-distance runner
- Philemon Kiprono Kemboi (born 1974), Kenyan former long-distance runner
- Silvia Kemboi (born 1988), Kenyan long-distance runner who specializes in race walking
- Simon Kemboi (born 1967), Kenyan 400 metres sprinter and World Championships medallist

Given name:

- Polat Kemboi Arıkan (born 1990), Kenyan long-distance track runner competing for Turkey
- John Kemboi Kibowen (born 1969), Kenyan former long-distance runner
- Lawrence Kemboi Kipsang (born 1993), Kenyan steeplechase runner
- David Kemboi Kiyeng (born 1983), Kenyan marathon runner and two-time Reims Marathon
- Micah Kemboi Kogo (born 1986), Kenyan long-distance runner and 2008 Olympic medallist

== See also ==
- Kipkemboi, related name meaning "son of Kemboi"
- Kamboi
- Kembo
