= Garry Bjorklund =

American middle- and long-distance runner

Personal information
- Nationality: American
- Born: April 22, 1951 (age 75) Duluth, Minnesota, U.S.

Sport
- Sport: Track, long-distance running
- Events: 5000 metres, 10,000 metres, marathon
- College team: Minnesota

Achievements and titles
- Olympic finals: 1976 Summer Olympics
- Personal bests: 3000m: 7:46.79; 2-mile: 8:28.6; 5000m: 13:32.33; 10,000m: 27:46.9; Marathon: 2:10:20

Garry Brian Bjorklund (born April 22, 1951) is an American middle- and long-distance runner. He represented the United States in the 1976 Summer Olympics in the 10,000 meters. As a high schooler, he set a Minnesota state record for the mile run which lasted 39 years. At the University of Minnesota, he won the 1971 national championship in the six-mile run, and won numerous conference championships in various disciplines. Following his 1976 Summer Olympics appearance, Bjorklund became a marathon runner, and set a national age group record in 1980.

== Early life and college career ==
Born in Duluth, Minnesota, on April 22, 1951, Bjorklund spent his early years in Twig, where he lived on a farm. In his high school years, he took up running; Bjorklund ran a mile in 4:19 his freshman year at Proctor High School. At the 1969 Minnesota State Meets, he broke the state high school mile record with a time of 4:05.1. As of the 2020–21 school year, the Minnesota State High School League continues to consider Bjorklund's time a state record. Also in 1969, he won the Amateur Athletic Union 15,000 m title.

That year, Bjorklund began attending the University of Minnesota, where he began competing in longer races. At Minnesota, he participated in track and field (indoor and outdoor) and cross country running. During his time at college, he was named an All-American five times: twice each in outdoor track and field and cross country, and once in indoor track and field. In 1970, he won the mile run at the Big Ten Conference championships. The next year, at the National Collegiate Athletic Association Men's Outdoor Track and Field Championship, he claimed a victory in the six-mile run, setting a meet record with a time of 27:43.1. While at Minnesota, Bjorklund won Big Ten championships in other disciplines; he won numerous other conference titles, including three in two and three-mile runs. From 1969 to 1971, Bjorklund had a streak of three consecutive Big Ten cross country championships. He also won the Big Ten five-mile championship twice and the six-mile title in 1971, the same year as his national championship win in that distance. Bjorklund broke Big Ten records in seven categories, including the indoor and outdoor three-mile and outdoor mile. In 1971, he ran in the Pan American Games.

Although he had been considered a strong contender to qualify for the United States' track and field team at the 1972 Summer Olympics, Bjorklund was unable to go to the U.S. Olympic Trials because of an injured left foot, and therefore missed the Games. He was forced to undergo surgery, and according to the University of Minnesota, "doctors told him that he may never run again." Although Bjorklund missed the 1973 college season, he returned to competition for Minnesota in 1974.

== Post-college career ==
Bjorklund competed in his second Pan American Games in 1975. In the 10,000 m run, he finished just outside the medal places, in fourth. In June 1976, Bjorklund ran in the 10,000 m race at the U.S. Olympic Trials, seeking a place at the 1976 Summer Olympics. The race was held at Eugene, Oregon's Hayward Field over almost 25 laps; the top three finishers would earn a spot on the U.S. Olympic team. In the first half of the race, the leading contenders—Bjorklund, Craig Virgin, Bill Rodgers, and Frank Shorter—stayed grouped together. During lap 14, Bjorklund lost his left shoe when another runner made contact with his foot. Despite only wearing one shoe, Bjorklund continued running, but with two laps remaining Rodgers had built a 30 m lead on him. While Shorter and Virgin battled for the win, Bjorklund made up his deficit to Rodgers and overtook him, beating him to the finish line by less than a second. At the Olympics, Bjorklund reached the 10,000 m final, becoming the lone U.S. qualifier for the event. He did not win a medal in the final, ending in 13th place.

By 1977, Bjorklund had started running in marathons, and the next year announced that he would focus on them. He cited a lack of support from track promoters and governing bodies and said, "I got more notice running in my first two marathons than I did in my total track career." In his third career marathon appearance, Bjorklund had a course-record time of 2:13:46.4 at the Maryland Marathon. Bjorklund posted a fifth-place finish in the 1977 New York City Marathon, and was the early leader in 1978 before fading in the final eight miles. Bjorklund was the winner of 10 "major road races" in 1978, and was considered a main competitor for Rodgers, the winner of those New York City Marathons. At the 1979 Boston Marathon, he again finished in fifth.

Due to the 1980 Summer Olympics boycott by the U.S., Bjorklund was unable to run the marathon in the Games that year. After declining to run in the Boston Marathon, he decided against taking part in the U.S. Olympic Trials. However, he did run the fastest marathon of his career at that year's Grandma's Marathon, posting a time of 2:10.20. That time, the third-quickest of the year in the U.S., set a national record for his age. By 1981, Bjorklund was the owner of a series of five stores selling running goods in the Minneapolis – Saint Paul region. At the 1984 U.S. Olympic Trials in the marathon, Bjorklund pulled out with about eight miles left. He also attempted to make the 10,000 m team, but was passed for the final qualifying spot in the final 300 m. As of 2015, Bjorklund resides in Fort Collins, Colorado.

== Honors ==
Bjorklund was inducted into the Road Runners Club of America's Hall of Fame in 1988. He is also in the Hall of Fame of his high school, and in 1992 the University of Minnesota inducted him into its M Club Hall of Fame. In 2012, the Colorado Running Hall of Fame honored Bjorklund. The Grandma's Marathon in Duluth named a side event after him; the Garry Bjorklund Half Marathon has been held since 1991.

== Sources ==
- Benyo, Richard; Henderson, Joe (2002). Running Encyclopedia: The ultimate source for today's runner. Human Kinetics. ISBN 0-7360-3734-9.
- Christensen, Ray (2002). Ray Christensen's Gopher Tales: Stories from All Eleven University of Minnesota Men's Sports. Sports Publishing LLC. ISBN 1-58261-469-5.
- Sandrock, Michael (1996). Running with the Legends: Training and Racing Insights from 21 Great Runners. Human Kinetics. ISBN 0-87322-493-0.
