= Ridouane Harroufi =

Moroccan long-distance runner (born 1981)

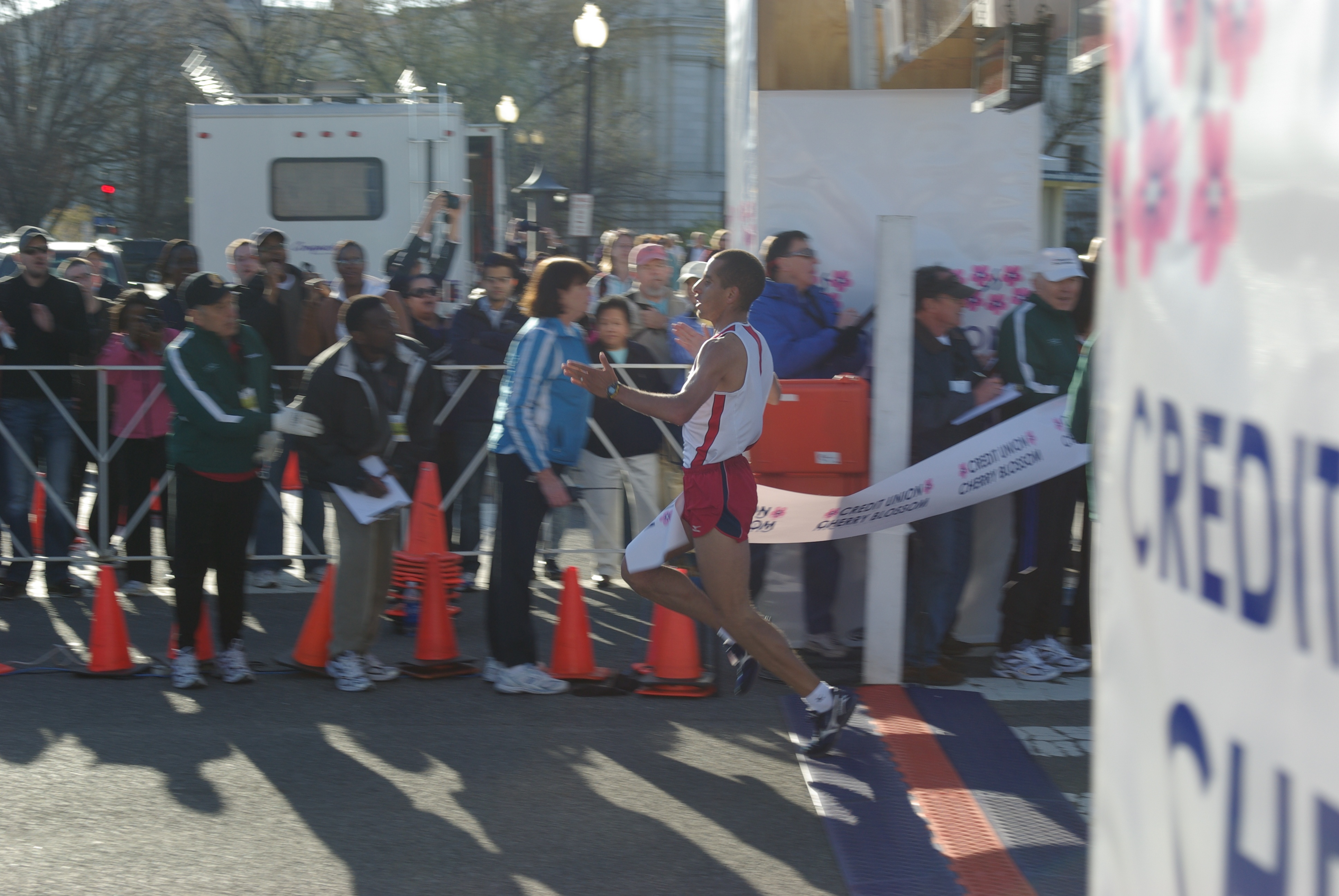
- Harroufi winning the 2009 Cherry Blossom 10-Mile Run, with a time of 45:56
- Born: 30 July 1981 (age 45); Azrou, Morocco
- Occupation: Long-distance runner

Ridouane Harroufi (born 30 July 1981) is a Moroccan-born, American long-distance runner who competes in road running competitions, including the marathon. He has won several high-profile road races in the United States, including the Azalea Trail Run, Bay to Breakers, Boilermaker Road Race, Bolder Boulder, Cherry Blossom Ten Mile Run, Gate River Run and OneAmerica 500 Festival Mini-Marathon.

He represented Morocco three times at the IAAF World Cross Country Championships and twice at the IAAF World Half Marathon Championships.

Harroufi is currently serving an eight-year ban set to end in 2028 for an anti-doping rule violation.

== Career ==
He first represented his country at the IAAF World Cross Country Championships, running in the junior races in 1999 and 2000. He was sixth over 1500 metres at the 2000 World Junior Championships in Athletics. Moving up to the senior ranks, he came tenth at the 2003 IAAF World Half Marathon Championships to lead Morocco to fourth place in the men's team rankings. The year after he ran in the long race at the 2004 IAAF World Cross Country Championships, but managed only 63rd place.

He won the Parelloop 10K in race in the Netherlands in 2005. On April 6, 2008, he won the Cherry Blossom 10-Mile Run in Washington D.C., and successfully defended his title on April 5, 2009. He won the Bolder Boulder race twice consecutively in 2007 and 2008.

He won the Cherry Blossom ten-miler in 45 minutes and 56 seconds, the fastest time in the event since Simon Rono ran 45:51 in 1998. He also won the Boilermaker Road Race in Utica, New York and Azalea Trail Run that year. He came ninth at the 2010 Chicago Marathon in a time of 2:13:01 hours.

On May 15, 2011, Harroufi won the 100th Bay to Breakers 12K in San Francisco California with a time of 34 minutes and 26 seconds, breaking a string of 20 consecutive event victories by runners from Kenya. He won the 34th annual Boilermaker Road Race for the second time in his career on July 10, 2011. His official race time was 43 minutes and 30 seconds. He ran at the 2011 Fukuoka Marathon and was ninth overall.

Harroufi served a two-year ban from 2013 to 2015 for an anti-doping rule violation after testing positive for EPO.

He gained American citizen and became eligible to represent the United States internationally in 2020.

In September 2020, Harroufi was issued with second career ban lasting eight-years to run from 2020 to 2028 for an anti-doping rule violation after testing positive for anabolic steroids.

== International competitions ==
Year	Competition	Venue	Position	Event	Notes
1999	World Cross Country Championships	Belfast, United Kingdom	48th	Junior race	28:39
1999	World Cross Country Championships	Belfast, United Kingdom	4th	Team	79 pts
2000	World Cross Country Championships	Vilamoura, Portugal	29th	Junior race	24:52
2000	World Cross Country Championships	Vilamoura, Portugal	6th	Team	105 pts
2000	World Junior Championships	Santiago, Chile	6th	1500 m	3:43.34
2003	World Half Marathon Championships	Vilamoura, Portugal	10th	Half marathon	1:02:46
2003	World Half Marathon Championships	Vilamoura, Portugal	4th	Team	3:09:22
2004	World Cross Country Championships	Brussels, Belgium	63rd	Senior race	38:57
2004	World Cross Country Championships	Brussels, Belgium	4th	Team	68 pts
2004	World Half Marathon Championships	New Delhi, India	—	Half marathon	DNF
