= Janice Ettle =

American runner

Personal information
- Born: December 3, 1958 (age 67) Stearns County, Minnesota, United States

Sport
- Sport: Marathon running

Janice Ettle (born December 3, 1958) is an American middle-distance and long-distance runner, winner of major marathons and top finisher in dozens of road races, as well as a competitor at the 1987 World Marathon Cup and fourth-place finisher at the Havana, Cuba, 1991 Pan American Games women's marathon. Ettle was a five-time competitor at the US Olympic Marathon Trials.

== Professional career ==
In 1980, she won the Las Vegas Celebrity Sun Marathon in 2:47:50. In 1982, Ettle won Grandma's Marathon in Duluth, Minnesota in 2:41:21. She also came in second in the Honolulu Marathon that year (2:43:46). The same year, she won the Thunder Bay Half Marathon (1:15:50), and the Dallas 20K (1:13:48).

Between 1986 and 1990, Ettle finished in the top five for the woman's US National Championship in the marathon.

In 1984, Ettle finished sixth in the first woman's United States Olympic marathon trials, in 2:33:41, just ahead of Nancy Ditz. It was the 18th best marathon time by a US woman. Joan Benoit, who won the race, later won the gold medal in the event at the Olympics.

She ran in four more US Olympic Marathon Trials. In 1992, she finished 10th; and 20th in 1988.

In 1984, Ettle won the Freihofer's Run for Women. Also in 1984, Ettle came in third at the Philadelphia Distance Classic Half Marathon, a race with 7,300 runners. She ran a 1:12:01, finishing behind Joan Benoit and Judi St. Hilaire.

She was the winner of the 1985 Twin Cities Marathon in Minneapolis-St. Paul, Minnesota, when she posted the ninth best time that year in the United States for women: 2:35:47.

In 1986, Ettle ran and won the Alaska 10-K Classic, a race that offered a showdown of many top American runners, including Alberto Salazar and Don Clary, who won for the men and said "if Janice wouldn't have been here, I couldn't have done it." She finished in 33:43. The next month, on route to a fifth-place finish in the Twin Cities Marathon, just missed getting hit by a car on Summit Avenue in St. Paul, Minnesota. Unfortunately, Laura Albers was struck. Ettle witnessed her skid on the ground, get up, and keep running to finish sixth.

The year 1987 saw Ettle compete on the global stage at the 1987 World Marathon Cup, where she finished first for the American women and 14th overall in a time of 2:37:02.

She earned a trip to Havana, Cuba for the 1991 Pan American Games women's marathon on the US team, and she finished fourth in 2:49:22. The US took second overall in the competition.

She was also a winner of many other 10K, 5K, 10-mile races, as well as marathons and half marathons, including the North Country Marathon in Walker, Minnesota, the City of Lakes 25K run. Ettle won the City of Lakes 25K twice, in 1985 (1:29:12) and 1992 (1:32:49).

Ettle qualified for and raced in the 1992 United States Olympic Trials for the 10,000 meter race.

== Early and personal life ==
Ettle grew up in Stearns County, Minnesota. She began running in 1974 and set girl’s high school records in the state. The high school sports association named her the 1977 Track and Field Athlete of the Year. She graduated from Albany High School in 1977. Instead of moving away to college, she went to Alexandria Technical and Community College. She became a medical laboratory technician.

Later in life she coached and assisted many emerging runners in Minnesota. She is known for her kindness and mental toughness. Ettle has been inducted into the Albany High School Hall of Fame and the University of Minnesota Track and Field Hall of Fame. Ettle later lived near Minneapolis where she worked as a dental hygienist.
