= Grandma's Marathon =

American road race

- Grandma's Marathon race logo
- Date: third Saturday in June
- Location: Two Harbors, Minnesota to Duluth, Minnesota
- Event type: Paved Road
- Distance: 26.2 miles (42.2 km)
- Established: 1977
- Course records: Men: 2:09:06 (2014); Dominic Ondoro; Women: 2:23:52 (2024); Volha Mazuronak; Nonbinary: 2:38:09 (2026); Zoey Viavattine
- Website: grandmasmarathon.com
- Participants: 9,000

Grandma's Marathon (Grandma's) is an annual road running race held on the third Saturday in June in Duluth, Minnesota, in the United States. The course runs point-to-point from the city of Two Harbors on Scenic Route 61 and continues along Lake Superior into the city of Duluth. The finish is located in Canal Park, near Grandma's Restaurant, which is next to the highly visible Aerial Lift Bridge. Garry Bjorklund famously described the course by saying, "You start in the middle of the woods, run along the beautiful shores of Lake Superior and you finish at a pub."

With over 7,000 finishers, it is one of the ten largest marathons in the United States. The race has a reputation for being well-organized, friendly, and fast despite some gentle hills throughout the course.

== Race history ==
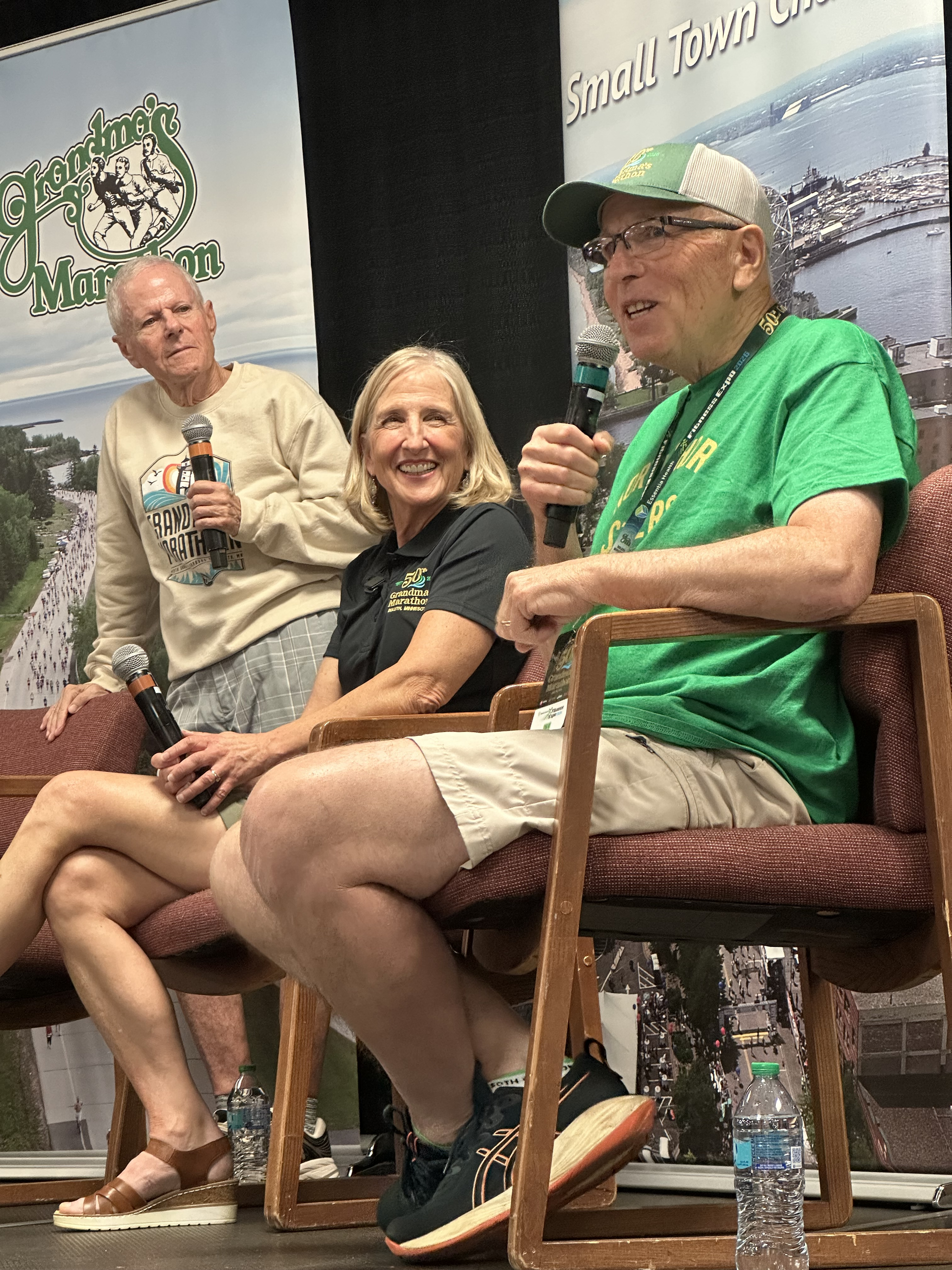
Grandma’s Marathon founder Scott Keenan (right) and the first Grandma's Marathon women's champion Wendy Cregg (middle) on June 19, 2026

Scott Keenan, a member of the North Shore Striders running group, had the idea to start a marathon from Two Harbors to Duluth but was turned down by local banks and businesses in 1976. In 1976, Keenan recruited members of the North Shore Striders running group to run and provide feedback on the course he designed. The newly opened Grandma's Restaurant was the only local business that would sponsor the then-fledgling event, providing $600 out of a race budget between $600 and $1200. The registration fee for the first running of the event was $3, with a $4 late registration fee. The biggest race expense in 1977 was buying 100 t-shirts for $2.50 each which were handed out to finishers. In 1986, Grandma's Saloon and Deli announced it could no longer afford to provide Grandma's Marathon the budget it deserved. It contributed $55,000, but the race had an estimated budget of $250,000 that year.

Grandma's was first run in 1977 with only 160 participants, ten of whom were women. The race initially started at the split between Scenic Highway 61 and the Highway 61 expressway in Two Harbors. Roads were not closed to traffic, so runners had to share the road with cars. A red truck driven by Gordy Nichols led the runners along the race course. A pickup truck driven by Keenan's father gave a ride to runners unable to finish. At the time, the area that would become known as Canal Park was primarily a scrapyard for old ships; the night before the first race, Keenan painted fences white to appear more attractive to finishers.

The first race was won by Minnesotan and 1976 Olympic 10000m runner Garry Bjorklund and Wendy Hovland. Bjorklund wore leather shoes for most of the race which proved to be slippery, changing them into a pair with "more bounce" in front of a supper club called London House in Duluth. The first running of Grandma's Marathon had a four hour time-cutoff, however multiple runners finished after this mark. The last place finisher in 1977 was Dr. Leonard Linnell, who finished in 6 hours and 5 minutes. The oldest finisher in 1977 was Alex Ratelle at age 52 who placed fourth; Ratelle went on to become recognized as the "grandfather" of the race due to the tenure of his role as a race ambassador.

Aid stations in the 1977 through 1980 races offered water and a sports drink called ERG, which stood for "electrolyte replacement with glucose". As of 2001, aid stations offered water and a sports drink called Ultima. Aid stations since at least 2014 have provided water and Powerade.

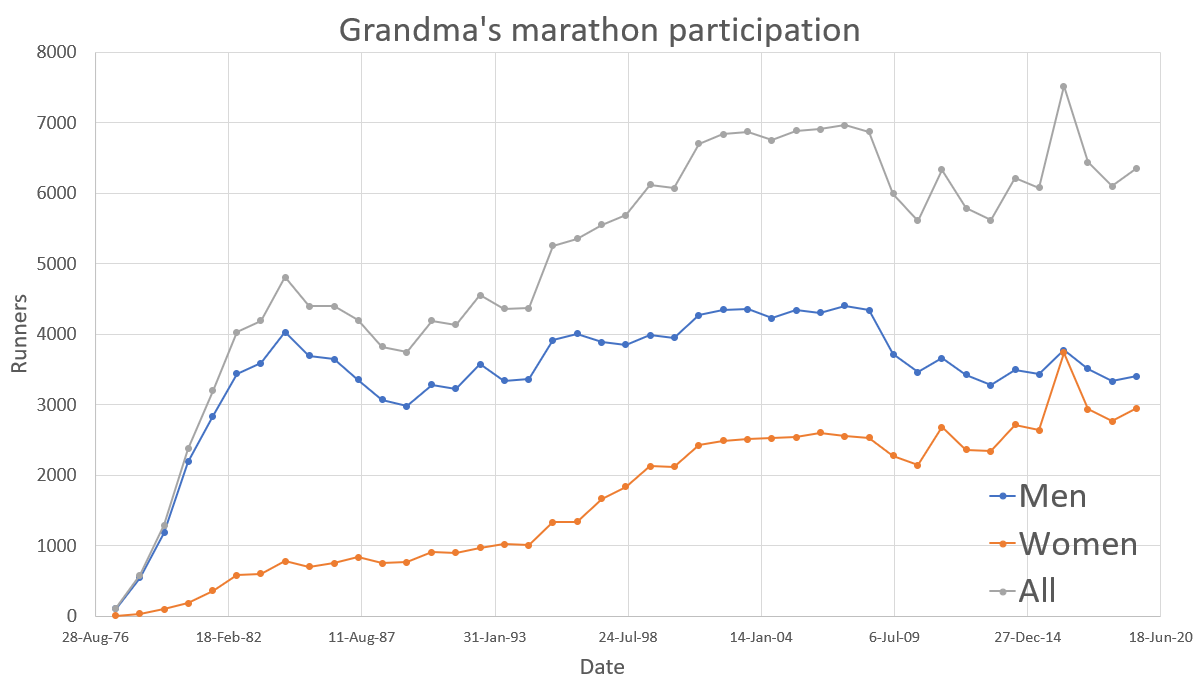
Finishers by year, total and men and women

Grandma's Marathon-affiliated races are now run by almost 20,000 participants every year, has nearly a $2 million operating budget and is credited with increasing tourism within the city of Duluth. The race is a major event on the North Shore, filling hotels in many cities around Duluth. Thousands of runners and visitors fill the marathon, half and 5 km races. As of 2016, VisitDuluth estimated 65,000 people visit Duluth for Grandma's and spend a total of $10 million. After high numbers in the 1990s and 2000s, 2009 was the first time in 15 years that all of the 9,500 available spots were not filled, leading to a deficit in the race budget. Executive director Scott Keenan suggested that the economy was the main reason for the downturn in participants. Lifetime entries were offered in 1987 (for $100) and again in 1990 (for $125) to help increase the number of runners entering the race.

The men's record for Grandma's is 2:09:06, set in 2014 by Dominic Ondoro of Kenya. The previous record of 2:09:37, set in 1981 by Wayzata, Minnesota-native Dick Beardsley stood for 33 years before being broken.

The women's record time is 2:23:52, set in 2024 by Volha Mazuronak.

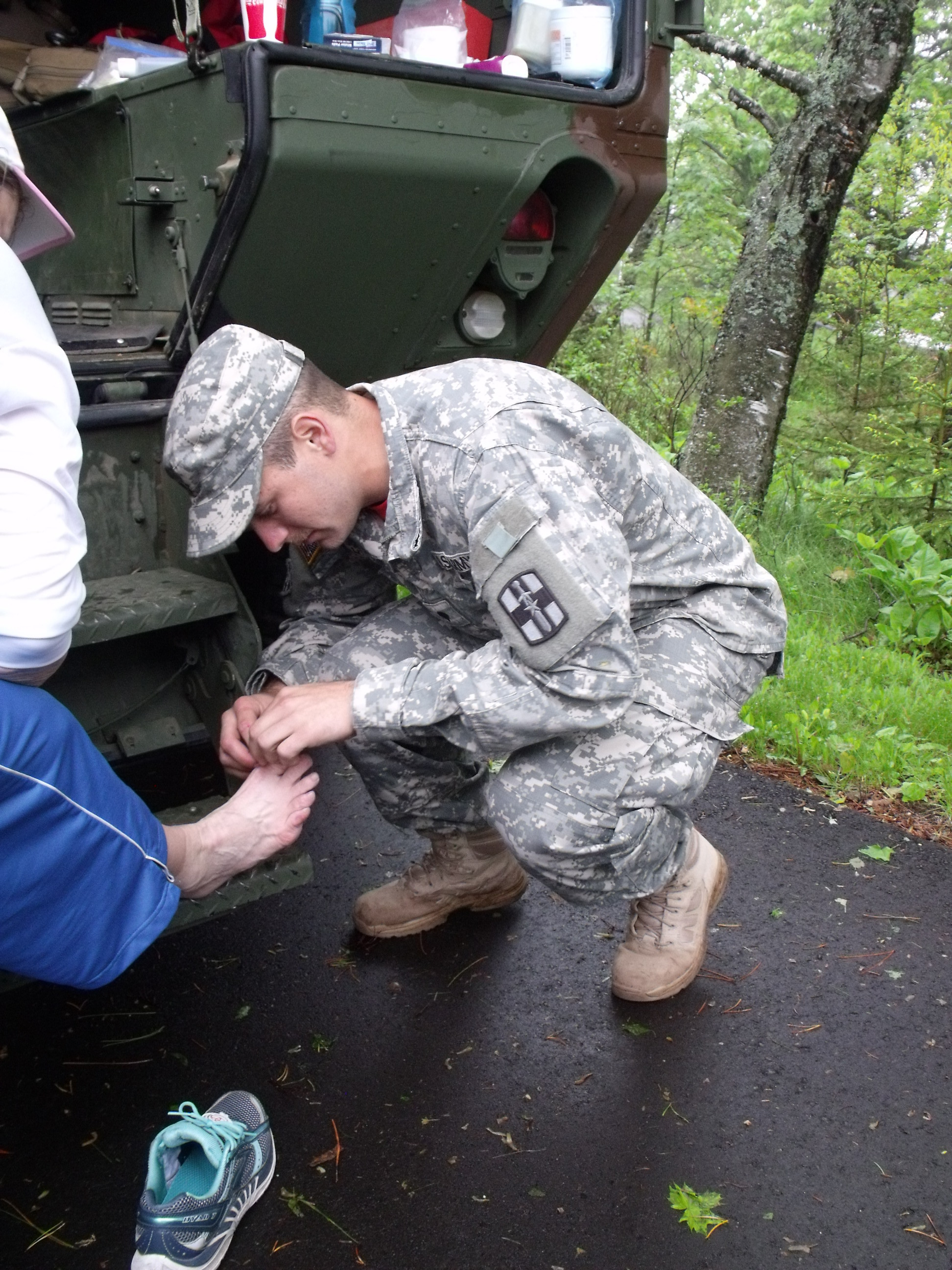
A combat medic with the 477th Medical Company, applies a bandage during Grandma's Marathon on June 22, 2013

The US Army 477th Medical Company provided first aid assistance for Grandma's Marathon since 1980.

In 1986, eight-year-old Erin Seitz was volunteering at an aid station at Grandma's Marathon and was injured when a van struck her. She broke two bones in the incident. Grandma's Marathon first awarded finisher medals in 1986; previously finishers received a certificate.

In 1990, future Speaker of the House Paul Ryan ran Grandma's Marathon, which is the only marathon he is known to have run, and finished in 4 hours, 1 minute, and 25 seconds. When he was running to be the US Vice President in 2012, Ryan told radio host Hugh Hewitt his marathon personal best was under three hours, specifically "I had a two hour and fifty-(minute) something."

In 1995, Sue Olsen ran Grandma's Marathon 16 days before the due date for her first child. Her husband drove parallel to the race with a cellular phone in case she went into labor. Olsen finished the race in 4 hours and 50 seconds, however official race results credit her time as 3 hours 33 minutes and 39 seconds.

In 1996, Patrick Muturi won the 20th running of Grandma's Marathon without taking in any fluids claiming it causes him stomach issues.

In 2001, Grandma's Marathon first used ChampionChip timing devices. The devices were attached to runners' shoes and were collected at the end of the race. Previously, finishers had to line up in narrow chutes at the finish so race officials could detach a section of each runner's bib containing a bar code, where they would be stuck onto a spindle, and later entered into a computer.

In 2005, Halina Karnatsevich was the first finisher with a time of 2:33:39 but she was later disqualified for failing her post-race doping test. The Garry Bjorklund Half Marathon first awarded finishers a medal in 2005.

In 2007, Grandma's Marathon adopted a stricter drug use policy partially in response to the disqualification of the 2005 women's champion. Grandma's Marathon race officials seized portable media players at the start of the race and mailed them back to their owners to comply with USATF rules banning the use of headphones. About 30 runners who ignored the ban were disqualified that year. Portable media players were allowed again in 2009 after the USATF reversed its position.

The winner of the 2005 and 2007 Grandma's Marathon, Wesly Ngetich, was shot and killed by an arrow in Kenya, preventing him from returning to defend his title in 2008. Scott Keenan said of his passing, "The city of Duluth kind of adopted him, and he kind of adopted the city of Duluth."

The 148th Fighter Wing has conducted a ceremonial military fly-over at the start of Grandma's Marathon since at least 2009. Colonel Scott Prom said of the marathon, "Grandma’s Marathon is cornerstone of our community. It’s a showcase of the spirit and endurance of Minnesota." In 2018, members of the 148th Fighter Wing were deployed to Southwest Asia and ran the William A. Irvin 5k remotely.

The 35th edition of the marathon in 2011 had its first photo-finish: eventual winner Christopher Kipyego mistook the electronic timing mat for the finish point and prematurely stopped, leading to an impromptu sprint finish against Teklu Deneke. Just two tenths of a second ended up separating the pair.

Kara Goucher won the Garry Bjorklund Half Marathon which was the USA Half Marathon Championship in 2012 with a time of 1:09:46, which was then a course record. Goucher credits Scott Keenan with inspiring her to become a marathoner and compete in the Championship to prepare her for the Olympics.

The 37th running of the race in 2013 saw the first time that more people registered for the Bjorklund Half Marathon than Grandma's Marathon. There were 7,835 registered for the Bjorklund Half Marathon but only 7,338 people registered for Grandma's Marathon.

Grandma's Marathon was part of the Great Lakes Marathon Series, a circuit of 25 marathon races near the Great Lakes, from 2013 until 2019.

The 40th annual race in 2016 set a record for the largest number of finishers at 7,423. 2016 also saw a record number of female finishers at 3,742, just short of the men's total at 3,780.

In 2020, Grandma's Marathon added a woman to its official logo in a move organizers said was "long over-due."

The race was run every year for 44 years until the COVID-19 pandemic. Race officials monitored the spread of COVID-19 in the state, and as the count of infected grew in St. Louis County, concerns mounted. On March 25, Minnesota Gov. Tim Walz announced a "stay at home" executive order for all citizens of the state. Three days into the "stay at home" order, Grandma's Marathon officials announced that, for the first time, the marathon, the Garry Bjorklund Half Marathon, and the William A. Irvin 5K would be canceled. No refunds or deferments were granted, but officials offered those who had already signed up a 40 percent discount on the 2021 or 2022 race.

In 2023, Grandma's Marathon announced the Running to Common Ground program, which offers 500 discounted entries to underrepresented communities and cultures. This built upon the introduction of a non-binary division starting in 2022.

The 48th annual race in 2024 set a new event record for the largest number of finishers at 7,536. With 3,126 female finishers, 2024 did not surpass the 2016 record number of female finishers at 3,742.

The 49th annual race in 2025 was expected to set a new record of finishers, and did with 7,542 finishers. Joel Reichow became the first person to win both Grandma's Marathon and Garry Bjorklund Half Marathon.

The 50th annual race was run on June 20, 2026. Minnesota Governor Tim Walz ran the Garry Bjorklund Half in a time of 1:52:51, and boasted he was the "fastest governor in America." Duluth Mayor Roger Reinert ran Grandma's Marathon. John Naslund became the only athlete finished every Grandma's Marathon to date. Jim Nowak also competed, having the distinction of having started every Grandma's Marathon to date; Nowak started the 2025 race but was unable to finish due to having contracted Lyme disease. The 50th anniversary festivities concluded with a drone show at dusk, and the Aerial Lift Bridge and Enger Tower were both be lit green for the weekend.

The Grandma's Marathon course has several iconic landmarks, including:

- Glensheen Historic Estate at approximately 21 miles (34 km)
- Lemon Drop Hill at the 22 miles (35 km) mark
- Troll Mile at approximately 22 miles (35 km)
- Historic Fitger's Brewing Company at approximately 24 miles (39 km)
- Great Lakes Aquarium at about 25.2 miles (40.6 km)
- SS William A. Irvin at about 25.5 miles (41.0 km)

== Race weekend ==
What started in 1977 as a single race has grown to a weekend of running events hosted by the Grandma's Marathon organization.

Thursday starts the health expo at the Duluth Entertainment Convention Center. Since 1977, there has been an all-you-can-eat spaghetti dinner to help runners carbohydrate load. In 2025, this involved preparing 2,400 pounds (1,100 kg) of spaghetti, 5,000 pounds (2,300 kg) of sauce, 360 pounds (160 kg) salad greens, and 32,000 meatballs for an estimated 8,000 guests.

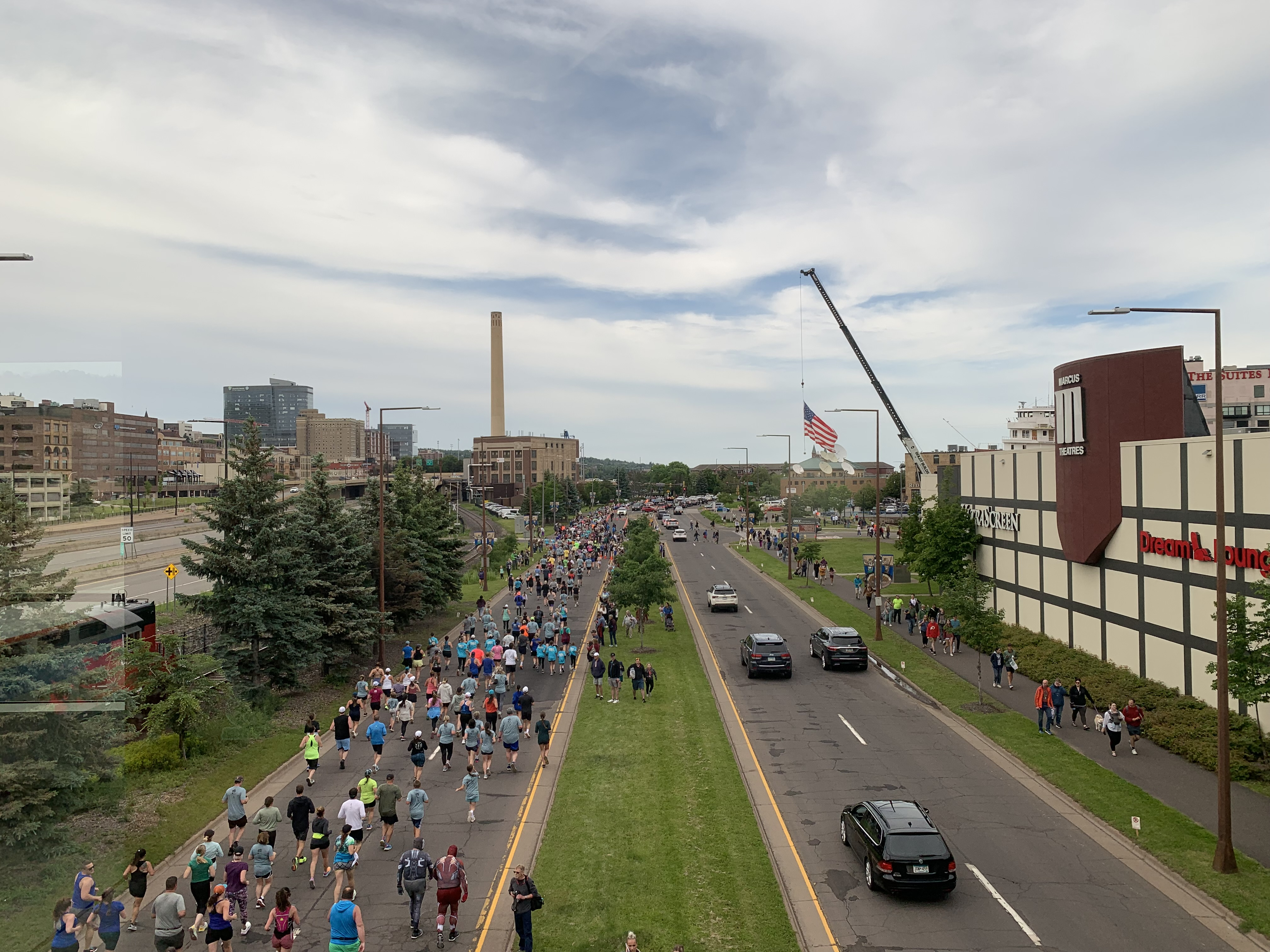
William A. Irvin 5 km race in June 2024

Races begin Friday, kicked off with Whipper Snapper races for kids at Bayfront Festival Park, followed by the William A. Irvin 5K, which was first run in 1994. The race is named after the Great Lakes ore boat docked in the slip at the canal; the course starts at the stern, circles the canal area and finishes at the bow. Nearly 2,000 runners participate.

Early Saturday morning, the Garry Bjorklund Half Marathon, kicks off, sending more than 7,000 runners south on Scenic Route 61 to Duluth. The half marathon was first run in 1991 and has since eclipsed the marathon in participation by a few hundred runners. The race starts near the Talmadge River.

The half marathon begins at 6:00 am. The full marathon begins at 7:40 am for men's elite and sub-elite, followed by women's elite, sub-elite and citizens at 7:45.

Since 1977, "Grandma Rosa Brochi" receives athletes as they finish. The costume was designed and worn by Sandy Brennan, an original Grandma's Restaurant employee, to match the image of an Italian immigrant to Duluth. Since 1991, Leah Hulst (Brennan's daughter) has taken over playing the role. According to a made-up story, Grandma Rosa was a feisty lady that ran a boarding house for lonely sailors. Hulst said one of the more memorable moments of the role is each time Mary Akor won the race, she ran directly into her arms.

Throughout the rest of the year, the Grandma's Marathon organization runs other races, such as the Fitger's 5k, the Park Point 5 Miler, and the Grandma's Minnesota Mile. Grandma’s Marathon was the 10th largest marathon in the United States in 2023.

== Past winners ==
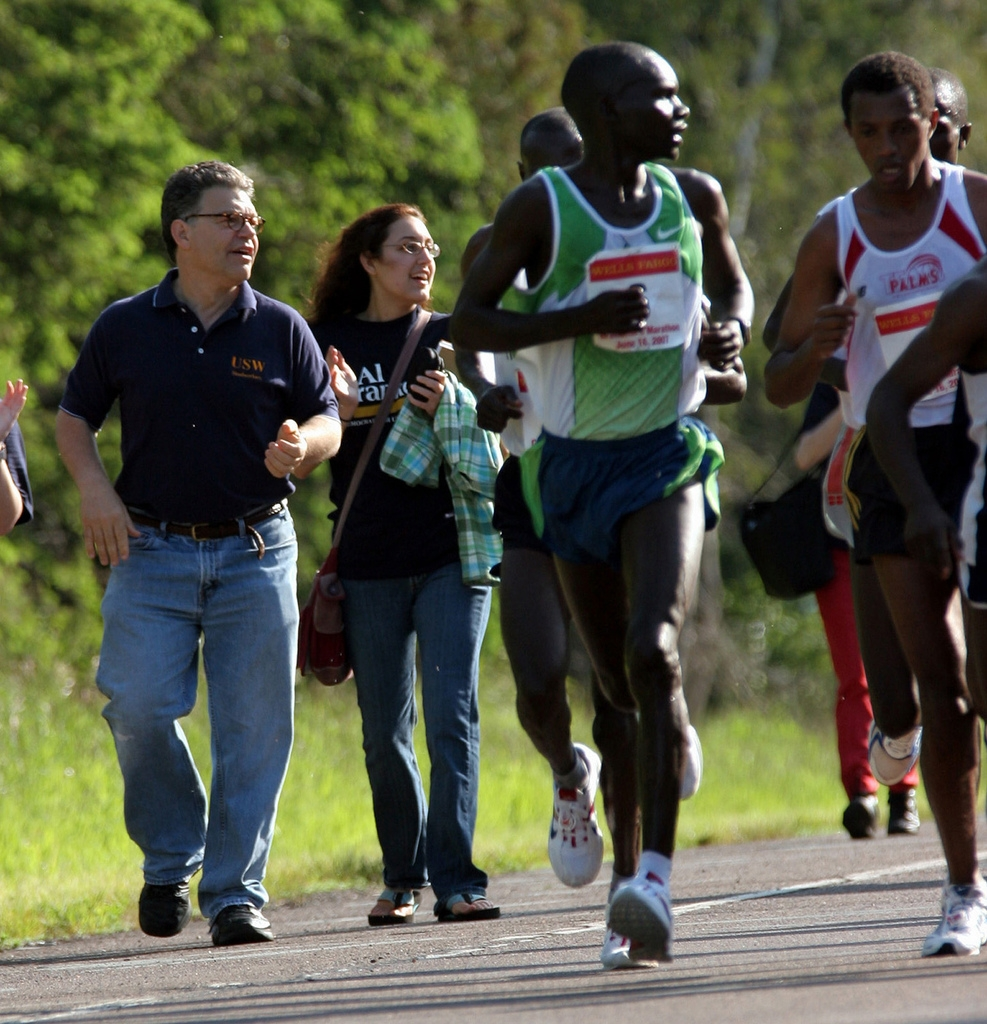
Al Franken and Wesley Ngetich Kimutai at the 2007 Grandma's Marathon

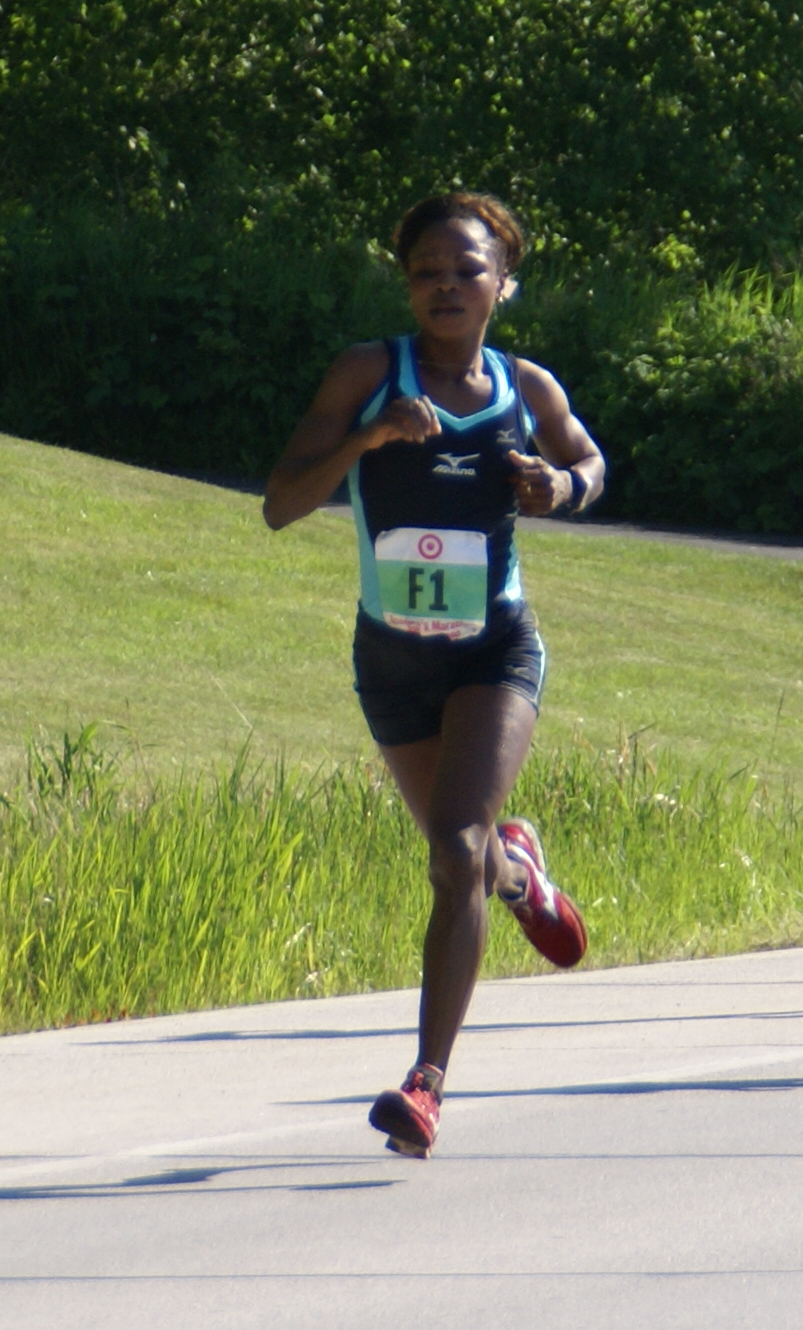
Mary Akor en route to winning the 2009 Grandma's Marathon

Key: Course record American championship race

Edition	Date	Men's winner	Time (h:m:s)	Women's winner	Time (h:m:s)
1	1977-06-25	Garry Bjorklund (USA)	2:21:54	Wendy Hovland (USA)	3:23:39
2	1978-06-24	Barney Klecker (USA)	2:18:42	Cheryl Westrum (USA)	2:57:14
3	1979-06-23	Ricky Wilde (ENG)	2:14:44	Lorraine Moller (NZL)	2:37:37
4	1980-06-21	Garry Bjorklund (USA)	2:10:20	Lorraine Moller (NZL)	2:38:35
5	1981-06-20	Dick Beardsley (USA)	2:09:37	Lorraine Moller (NZL)	2:29:35
6	1982-06-19	Dick Beardsley (USA)	2:14:50	Janice Ettle (USA)	2:41:21
7	1983-06-11	Gerry Helme (ENG)	2:12:10	Jenny Spangler (USA)	2:33:52
8	1984-06-16	Derek Stevens (ENG)	2:12:41	Anne Hird (USA)	2:37:30
9	1985-06-15	Don Norman (USA)	2:11:08	Susan Stone (CAN)	2:39:45
10	1986-06-21	Joseph Kipsang (KEN)	2:12:53	Karlene Herrell (USA)	2:38:45
11	1987-06-20	Dan Schlesinger (USA)	2:16:00	Janis Klecker (USA)	2:36:12
12	1988-06-11	Armando Azócar (VEN)	2:20:07	Jacqueline Gareau (CAN)	2:43:27
13	1989-06-17	Doug Kurtis (USA)	2:16:49	Louise Mohanna (USA)	2:39:50
14	1990-06-23	Igor Braslavskiy (URS)	2:18:12	Jane Welzel (USA)	2:33:25
15	1991-06-22	Driss Dacha (MAR)	2:13:59	Janice Ettle (USA)	2:35:27
16	1992-06-20	Roy Dooney (IRL)	2:13:25	Jane Welzel (USA)	2:33:01
17	1993-06-19	Doug Kurtis (USA)	2:16:38	Lorraine Hochella (USA)	2:34:46
18	1994-06-18	Donald Johns (USA)	2:18:19	Linda Somers (USA)	2:33:42
19	1995-06-17	Mark Curp (USA)	2:15:23	Irina Bogachova (KGZ)	2:34:11
20	1996-06-22	Patrick Muturi (KEN)	2:13:43	Mary Alico (USA)	2:32:42
21	1997-06-21	Patrick Muturi (KEN)	2:15:44	Irina Bogachova (KGZ)	2:38:44
22	1998-06-20	Simon Peter (TAN)	2:12:47	Elena Plastinina (UKR)	2:35:46
23	1999-06-19	Andrew Musuva (KEN)	2:13:22	Elena Makalova (BLR)	2:29:13
24	2000-06-17	Pavel Andreyev (RUS)	2:14:31	Svetlana Şepelev-Tcaci (MDA)	2:33:53
25	2001-06-16	Benjamin Matolo (KEN)	2:14:25	Lyubov Belavina (RUS)	2:35:13
26	2002-06-22	Elly Rono (KEN)	2:10:57	Zinaida Semenova (RUS)	2:32:21
27	2003-06-21	Joseph Kamau (KEN)	2:11:22	Firiya Sultanova (RUS)	2:27:05
28	2004-06-19	Vladimir Tyamchik (BLR)	2:17:59	Firiya Sultanova (RUS)	2:35:08
29	2005-06-18	Wesley Ngetich (KEN)	2:13:18	Halina Karnatsevich (BLR)	2:28:43
30	2006-06-17	Sergey Lukin (RUS)	2:14:30	Svetlana Nekhorosh (UKR)	2:37:33
31	2007-06-16	Wesley Ngetich (KEN)	2:15:55	Mary Akor (USA)	2:35:40
32	2008-06-21	Lamech Mokono (KEN)	2:13:39	Mary Akor (USA)	2:38:50
33	2009-06-20	Christopher Raabe (USA)	2:15:13	Mary Akor (USA)	2:36:52
34	2010-06-19	Philemon Kemboi (KEN)	2:15:44	Buzunesh Deba (ETH)	2:31:35
35	2011-06-19	Christopher Kipyego (KEN)	2:12:16	Yihunlish Delelecha (ETH)	2:30:39
36	2012-06-16	Berhanu Girma (ETH)	2:12:24	Everlyne Lagat (KEN)	2:33:13
37	2013-06-22	Bazu Worku (ETH)	2:11:12	Sarah Kiptoo (KEN)	2:26:32
38	2014-06-21	Dominic Ondoro (KEN)	2:09:06	Pasca Myers (KEN)	2:33:45
39	2015-06-20	Elisha Barno (KEN)	2:10:36	Jane Kibii (KEN)	2:32:06
40	2016-06-18	Elisha Barno (KEN)	2:11:26	Sarah Kiptoo (KEN)	2:33:28
41	2017-06-17	Elisha Barno (KEN)	2:12:06	Hellen Jepkurgat (KEN)	2:32:09
42	2018-06-16	Elisha Barno (KEN)	2:10:06	Kellyn Taylor (USA)	2:24:28
43	2019-06-22	Boniface Kongin (KEN)	2:11:56	Nell Rojas (USA)	2:28:06
44	2020-06-20*	Race canceled due to COVID-19	xx:xx:xx	Race canceled due to COVID-19	xx:xx:xx
45	2021-06-19	Milton Rotich (KEN)	2:13:03	Dakotah Lindwurm (USA)	2:29:04
46	2022-06-18	Dominic Ondoro (KEN)	2:09:34	Dakotah Lindwurm (USA)	2:25:01
47	2023-06-17	Elisha Barno (KEN)	2:09:14	Lauren Hagans (USA)	2:25:55
48	2024-06-22	Elisha Barno (KEN)	2:10:54	Volha Mazuronak (BLR)	2:23:52
49	2025-06-21	Joel Reichow (USA)	2:11:58	Lilian Chebii (KEN)	2:25:14
50	2026-06-20	Amanuel Mesel (ERI)	2:11:21	Dakotah Popehn (USA)	2:28:51

* After canceling the race, a "virtual race" was held.

=== Winners in non-binary category ===
- 2023, Steven Bugarin (USA): 2:50:29
- 2024, Zoey Viavattine (USA): 2:44:43
- 2025, Eli Blascyk (USA): 3:07:53
- 2026, Zoey Viavattine (USA): 2:38:09

=== Multiple winners, non-binary ===
2 wins

- Zoey Viavattine: 2024, 2026

=== Multiple winners, men ===
6 wins

- Elisha Barno: 2015, 2016, 2017, 2018, 2023, 2024

2 wins

- Garry Bjorklund: 1977, 1980
- Dick Beardsley: 1981, 1982
- Doug Kurtis: 1989, 1993
- Patrick Muturi: 1996, 1997
- Dominic Ondoro: 2014, 2022

=== Multiple winners, women ===
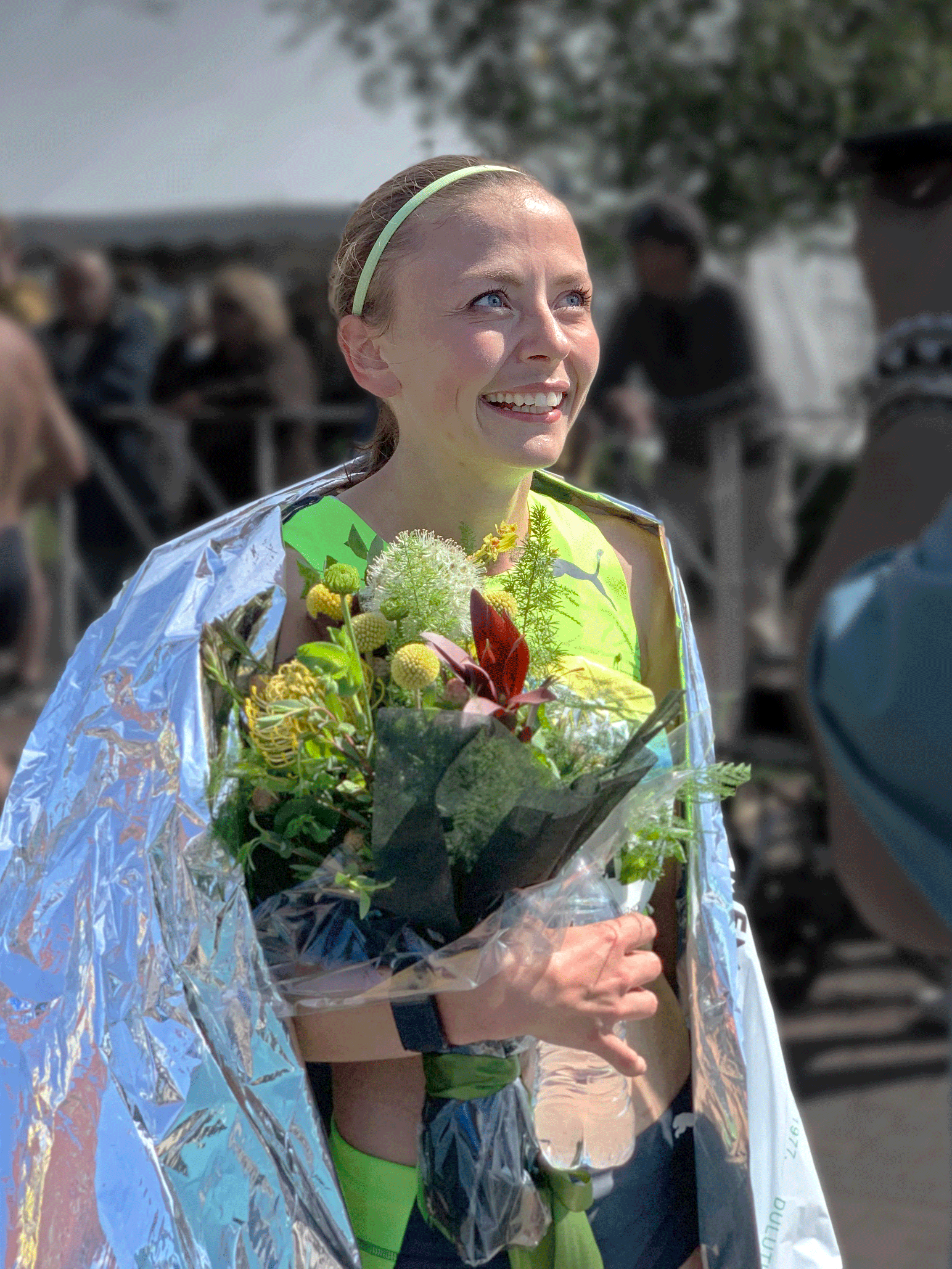
Dakotah Lindwurm after winning the 2022 Grandma's Marathon

3 wins

- Lorraine Moller: 1979, 1980, 1981
- Mary Akor: 2007, 2008, 2009
- Dakotah Popehn: 2021, 2022, 2026

2 wins

- Janice Ettle: 1982, 1991
- Jane Welzel: 1990, 1992
- Irina Bogachova: 1995, 1997
- Firiya Sultanova: 2003, 2004
- Sarah Kiptoo: 2013, 2016

== Garry Bjorklund Half Marathon past winners ==
Key: Course record American championship race

Edition	Date	Men's winner	Time (h:m:s)	Women's winner	Time (h:m:s)
1	1991-06-22	Thomas Plechter (USA)	1:08:44	Doris Widsand-Dausman (USA)	1:23:05
2	1992-06-20	Dan Carlson (USA)	1:07:27	Jill Anderson (USA)	1:21:28
3	1993-06-19	Dan Carlson (USA)	1:06:31	Kari Beasley (USA)	1:19:09
4	1994-06-18	Dan Carlson (USA)	1:08:20	Julie Cotter (USA)	1:25:30
5	1995-06-17	Thomas Plechter (USA)	1:09:22	Laurel Park (USA)	1:14:11
6	1996-06-22	Curt Kotsonas (USA)	1:06:12	Debra Gormley (USA)	1:16:57
7	1997-06-21	Sean Mulheron (USA)	1:07:30	Debra Gormley (USA)	1:20:05
8	1998-06-20	Sean Mulheron (USA)	1:06:53	Kelly Keeler (USA)	1:15:16
9	1999-06-19	Ryan Meissen (USA)	1:08:14	Mary Button (USA)	1:20:53
10	2000-06-17	Ryan Meissen (USA)	1:08:09	Kelly Keeler (USA)	1:16:21
11	2001-06-16	Ryan Meissen (USA)	1:06:10	Kelly Keeler (USA)	1:15:48
12	2002-06-22	Ryan Meissen (USA)	1:04:19	Debra Gormley (USA)	1:20:18
13	2003-06-21	Jason Lehmkuhle (USA)	1:06:43	Colleen De Reuck (USA)	1:10:00
14	2004-06-19	Ryan Meissen (USA)	1:05:51	Deena Kastor (USA)	1:10:30
15	2005-06-18	Ryan Meissen (USA)	1:06:38	Jennifer Blue (USA)	1:17:44
16	2006-06-17	Matt Hooley (USA)	1:06:40	Desiree Budd (USA)	1:15:33
17	2007-06-16	Chad Johnson (USA)	1:05:18	Paige Higgins (USA)	1:14:46
18	2008-06-21	Matthew Chesang (KEN)	1:04:48	Liza Hunter-Galvan (USA)	1:13:29
19	2009-06-20	Ernest Kebenei (USA)	1:05:15	Belainesh Gebre (ETH)	1:11:57
20	2010-06-19	Stephen Muange (KEN)	1:04:24	Caroline Rotich (KEN)	1:12:40
21	2011-06-19	Derese Deniboba (ETH)	1:02:19	Katie McGregor (USA)	1:13:18
22	2012-06-16	Abdi Abdirahman (USA)	1:02:46	Kara Goucher (USA)	1:09:46
23	2013-06-22	Meb Keflezighi (USA)	1:01:22	Adriana Nelson (USA)	1:09:57
24	2014-06-21	Julius Koskei (KEN)	1:03:36	Cynthia Limo (KEN)	1:09:50
25	2015-06-20	Shadrack Biwott (USA)	1:03:09	Neely Spence Gracey (USA)	1:11:27
26	2016-06-18	Macdonald Ondara (KEN)	1:03:33	Simegn Abnet Yeshanbel (ETH)	1:13:21
27	2017-06-17	Evans Kurui (KEN)	1:03:05	Biruktayit Degefa (ETH)	1:11:25
28	2018-06-16	Panuel Mkungo (KEN)	1:02:50	Monicah Ngige (KEN)	1:09:55
29	2019-06-19	Panuel Mkungo (KEN)	1:02:37	Katy Jermann (USA)	1:10:27
xx	2020-06-20*	Race canceled due to COVID-19	xx:xx:xx	Race canceled due to COVID-19	xx:xx:xx
31	2021-06-19	Mohamed Hrezi (LIB)	1:04:14	Ann Centner (USA)	1:14:23
32	2022-06-18	Daniel Kemoi (KEN)	1:02:03	Rosie Edwards (UK)	1:12:45
33	2023-06-17	Joel Reichow (USA)	1:02:30	Maggie Montoya (USA)	1:09:26
34	2024-06-22	Tebello Ramakongoana (LES)	1:00:17	Annie Frisbie (USA)	1:07:33
35	2025-06-21	Murphy Smith (USA)	1:02:49	Annie Frisbie (USA)	1:09:05
36	2026-06-20	Acer Iverson (USA)	1:01:15	Kasandra Parker (USA)	1:10:16

* After canceling the race, a "virtual race" was held.

=== Multiple winners, men ===
6 wins

- Ryan Meissen: 1999, 2000, 2001, 2002, 2004, 2005

3 wins

- Dan Carlson: 1992, 1993, 1994

2 wins

- Thomas Plechter: 1991, 1995
- Sean Mulheron: 1997, 1998
- Panuel Mkungo: 2018, 2019

=== Multiple winners, women ===
3 wins

- Kelly Keeler: 1998, 2000, 2001
- Debra Gormley: 1996, 1997, 2002

2 wins

- Annie Frisbie: 2024, 2025

== See also ==
- Twin Cities Marathon
- Minneapolis Marathon
- Mankato Marathon
- Med City Marathon
