= Stillwater Marathon =

Marathon in Minnesota, USA

- Stillwater Marathon Logo
- Date: ceased
- Location: Stillwater, Minnesota
- Event type: Paved Road
- Distance: 26.2 miles (42.2 km)
- Established: 2009
- Course records: Men: 2:42:31 (2011); Tom Tisell; Women: 3:09:06 (2009); Jessica Mike
- Website: stillwatermarathon.com
- Participants: 300

The Stillwater Marathon was a race run in Stillwater, Minnesota, from 2009 to 2011. The race was put on by St. Croix Events.

The race featured a scenic, hilly course near the St. Croix River and took place in late May. The race had more than 500 people sign up in 2009, but faced strong competition in the area with other marathons. Although the marathon ceased, Run Stillwater continues to run the Stillwater Half Marathon, 10K race, and 5K race.

== Marathon course ==
The race started near the Stillwater Lift Bridge, went south through Bayport, Minnesota, down the St. Croix River on the side of Minnesota State Highway 95 for five miles. It turned back on Stagecoach Trail and went west into Stillwater. Runners passed McKusick Lake and Otto Berg Park before going north, then downhill, and finishing near the lift bridge.

== Race weekend ==
The race organizers ran the marathon, a 20-mile race, a half-marathon and a 12K.

== Race results ==
Key: Course record

Year
Men				Women			
2009 Results May 24, 2009
Pete Hoyem	28	Stillwater	2:50:32	Jessica Mike	26	Minneapolis	3:09:06
2010 Results May 30, 2010
Tom Tisell	42	St. Paul	2:42:31	Kelly Brinkman	29	Hutchinson	3:11:53
2011 Results May 29, 2011
Pete Hoyem	30	Stillwater	2:53:32	April Cole	26	Hammond, Wisconsin	3:11:53
