= Philemon Kiprono Kemboi =

Kenyan marathon runner

Personal information
- Born: 1974 (age 50–51) Malaba, Kenya
- Years active: 2007-2013

Sport
- Country: Kenya
- Sport: Track and field

Philemon Kiprono Kemboi (born 1974) is a Kenyan former long-distance runner who competed in Africa, China, Europe and the United States, where he won the Grandma's Marathon in 2010.

== Professional career ==
Kemboi set a personal record time for the marathon distance in the IAAF-labeled Alpes-Maritimes Marathon. There, he finished fifth in a close pack with three Ethiopians and two Kenyans (they all finished within 30 seconds of each other). His time was 2:10:58.

In 2008, he finished in the top 10 at the IAAF gold-labeled Ljubljana Marathon.

One of his first big finishes was at the Bonn-Marathon in Germany, where he raced close to the eventual winner Vincent Kipchirchir before finishing third in 2:14:03.

In June 2010, Kemboi traveled to the United States for the first time ever, landing in Duluth, Minnesota, for the point-to-point marathon race along the shore of Lake Superior. More than 7,000 were registered for the Grandma's Marathon (named for its first sponsor, Grandma's Restaurant). After being founded in 1977, the race has been a destination for many runners in the United States. Kemboi appeared strong at the start, then stayed behind leaders Christopher Kipyego and Marrakech Marathon-winner David Rutoh until mile 23, and surged to take the lead at mile 25. He won the race in 2:15:44, and took home $10,900 in winnings.

In October 2010, as water was pooling in St. Mark's Square, Kemboi arrived to race. He dueled with other Kenyans and Ethiopians and ended up finishing 5th (clocking 2:12:45) in the 25th Venice Marathon.

In 2011, he ran at the Marathon de Toulouse Métropole, finishing in 2:13:26 for fourth. He was a top finisher at the Hong Kong Marathon the same year. By 2012, he was 38, and mostly out of professional running. He entered the Mount Kilimanjaro Half Marathon where his 1:08:21 was only good enough for 44th place.

== Personal life ==
Kemboi is from Malaba, Kenya, where his family farms. He ran as a professional from the years 2007–2013 and had problems with his visa that prevented him from competing in the United States after 2010.
