= Kambi =

Kambi may refer to:

- Kambi Group, a sports betting company
- Kampoi, village in Greece
