= Minneapolis Marathon =

Annual race in the United States held from 2009 to 2015

- Minneapolis Marathon logo
- Date: ceased
- Location: Minneapolis, Minnesota
- Event type: Paved Road
- Distance: 26.2 miles (42.2 km)
- Primary sponsor: Team Ortho Foundation
- Established: 2009
- Course records: Men: 2:37:25 (2010); Thomas Tisell; Women: 3:01:53 (2013); Abigail Wilhelm
- Website: none
- Participants: 900+

The Minneapolis Marathon was a marathon held in late May or early June in Minneapolis, Minnesota. The first race was held in 2009. In addition to the marathon, there was also half-marathon and 5K run. The course had sections of flats and hills. Most of the course followed the Mississippi Riverfront. The race was not held after 2015.

== Past winners ==
Key: Course record

Date	Men's winner	Time (h:m:s)	Women's winner	Time (h:m:s)
May 31, 2009	Thomas Tisell (USA)	2:42:57	Jessica Pink (USA)	3:04:16
June 6, 2010	Thomas Tisell (USA)	2:37:25	Anja Joela (USA)	3:14:25
June 5, 2011	Thomas Tisell (USA)	2:42:26	Jessica Lovering (USA)	3:07:26
June 3, 2012	Ted Lillie (USA)	2:40:22	Pam Nielsen (USA)	3:06:17
June 2, 2013	Bryan Larison (USA)	2:40:59	Abigail Wilhelm (USA)	3:01:53
June 1, 2014	canceled due to rain			
May 31, 2015	Marcus Hoof (USA)	2:39:28	Anna Widman (USA)	3:05:37
June 5, 2016	canceled due to inability to get permit to hold race			

== See also ==
- Twin Cities Marathon
- Grandma's Marathon
