= Kipkemoi =

Kipkemoi is a surname of Kenyan origin meaning "born at night". Notable people with the surname include:

- Gladys Kipkemoi (born 1986), Kenyan steeplechase runner
- Joan Kipkemoi (born 1993), Kenyan long-distance runner
- Kenneth Kipkemoi (born 1984), Kenyan long-distance runner
