= Elisha Barno =

Kenyan marathon runner

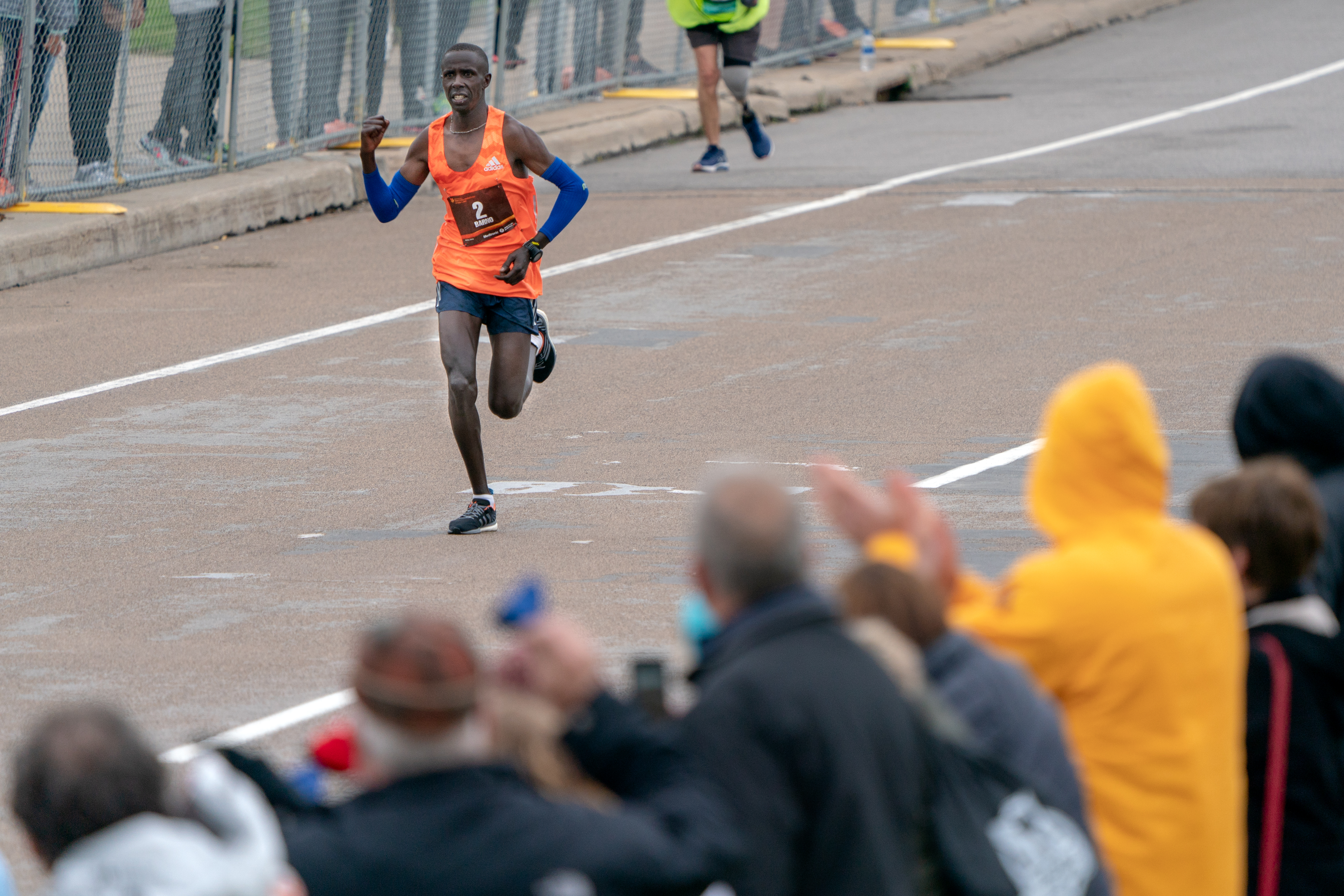
Barno had a time of 2:11:58 in his 2018 win of the Twin Cities Marathon.

Elisha Kiprop Barno (born 1985) is a Kenyan marathon runner. Barno is the most prolific runner in Grandma's Marathon history, winning the race four times 2015 to 2018 and again in 2023 and 2024. He has won several marathons during his career, including the Los Angeles Marathon, the Jacksonville Marathon, and the California International Marathon.

His best time is 2:09:14, in the 2023 Grandma's Marathon in Duluth, MN. Barno was inducted into the Grandma's Marathon Hall of Fame in 2023.
