= Sally Brent =

American long-distance runner

Sally Brent (born 9 October 1951) is an American long-distance running athlete who broke barriers for female runners in the late 1970s and early 1980s. Brent was the winner of the inaugural Twin Cities Marathon in 1982, running the race in 2:43:50. Only a few other American women had breached the 2:45:00 mark in 1982, and just seven years earlier, it had been the woman's world record.

== Early career ==
When Brent attended a Catholic high school in Pocahontas, Iowa, in the 1960s, the only athletic activity available to girls was cheerleading. Brent did not begin running until after her years at Wayne State College, when she was a smoker. She married and had children, and one day, she was encouraged to run a 10K road race. She completed the race, won second in her age group, and enjoyed the competition. Afterward, Brent set a goal of running the Drake Relays Marathon in Iowa.

She trained by logging several 26 mile runs—a common training practice in the 1970s. In smaller races near her home of Sioux City, Iowa, her family would follow by car or bicycle, cheering her on. Then, in Des Moines for the Drake Relays Marathon, she placed third in 3:18:37. Within two weeks of finishing, she had run another: the Lincoln Marathon, coming in seventh.

She raced in the 1980 Dallas Marathon, finishing 24th among women. She ran the Omaha Marathon in 1981 as a relative unknown runner, but placed fourth among the women. She was eighth in the May 1981 Lincoln Marathon. Then she finished 12th among women at the ’81 Dallas Marathon, and she set an age-group record for 30-year-old women with her time of 3:07:19.

== Career ==
After winning several other smaller races, Brent found a coach: Canadian Rob Kinnunen, himself a competitive runner. On a training plan, she won the smaller University of Okoboji-Coors Marathon in 1982, finishing first in 3:08:54. She raced a marathon in Rapid City, South Dakota, and broke the three-hour mark, finishing in third place.

She returned to the Lincoln Marathon and finished behind Carol Hafeman for second place. Still a relative unknown, she finished third in the Thunder Bay Half Marathon in September, and signed up for the Twin Cities Marathon in October.

The Minneapolis–Saint Paul region, north of Sioux City, had a marathon history that stretched back to 1963, when the race was called the “Land of Lakes Marathon.” In 1976, it was renamed “City of Lakes Marathon,” and in 1981, both cities competed with their own marathons. Instead of continuing the rivalry, race directors decided to combine into one race—and the Twin Cities Marathon was born in 1982. Brent would be there on the starting line.

Heading into the first ever TCM, the 30-year-old mother of three children was gaining confidence. She faced an international field drawn by a significant prize purse. Sissel Grottenberg had finished in the top 10 at Boston in 1981, Kersti Jacobsen was there from Denmark, and Jan Arenz (Yonkers Marathon and Land ‘o Lakes past winner) was also a favorite. In decent running weather, 100,000 spectators lined the streets of Minneapolis and St. Paul as the 4,000 runners moved through the cities. Brent took the lead and pulled ahead. As her coach screamed in joy from the side of the road, Brent crossed the finish line with a wide smile on her face. She won in 2:43:50 and took home a glass vase and a prize of $5,000.

At the time, runners couldn't take the prize money into their own bank accounts and maintain amateur status. She gave it to the Athletics Congress, which allowed her to use it for expenses without “going professional.”

One month later, Brent was in Omaha, Nebraska, for the Riverfront Omaha Marathon. She paced Missourian Carol Hafeman and Maxine Johnson, who dropped off and finished more than 10 minutes behind her as she won the race in 2:48:45. Her coach, Kinnunen, won for the men in 2:17:24. After the race, she expressed joy in the win, but disappointment in her time.

In January 1983, Brent went to Texas along with her coach. Both were running the Houston Marathon. Brent finished in the top 10 with a time of 2:45:20, putting her again as one of the top runners in the nation (and netting her prize money).

By the summer of 1983, Brent had a clothing sponsor and was getting shoes from Nike. The Twin Cities Marathon had Brent back in 1983 for their second official running, but this time, her picture was used on billboards and she was providing radio commentary for WCCO.

She finished off 1983's competitive season by traveling south to the Mississippi River delta and the New Orleans Marathon. She was named one of the favorites of the 1,000 runners, along with local runners Jenni Peters and the 1982 winner and Arkansas State University phenom Angela Pikschus. Peters went out fast, but faded later in the race. Pikschus ran a steady pace, and was acclimated to the heat, which Brent was not. Brent finished second, in 2:53:21.

She raced Boston in 1984, finishing 31st among women in a time of 2:52:51. She was at the 1985 Grandma's Marathon, finishing sub-3, placing 19th out of more than 700 women. She went to Trinidad for a 10K in which she placed second.

In 1988, Brent took third place in the Phoenix City Marathon in 2:53:23, behind Cynthia Gans and Harolene Walters. She also raced Twin Cities again, facing off against Janis Klecker, and the Lehane twins: Lesley and Lisa Welch Lehane. But Brent didn't find the same success. She finished in 3:02:10, behind winner Kim Jones.

In 1991, she was the master's champion at the Chicago Marathon, finishing under 3 hours and netting $500. She raced the City of Lakes 25K in 1992 and 1993, where she was considered a top contender. She placed as a top master in the Bix 7-mile in Illinois and finished fourth in the Steamboat Springs Half Marathon in Colorado. By the mid-90s, she was continuing to compete at the master's level in local races.

After her storied running career, Brent has been called an inspiration by other competitive runners.

== Personal life ==
Sally Brent is married to Rick; they have three children. They own a real estate company in Colorado.

== Achievements ==
Year	Competition	Venue	Position	Event	Notes
1982	Lincoln Marathon	Lincoln, Nebraska	2nd	Marathon	3:01:30
1982	Coors Marathon	Okoboji, Iowa	1st	Marathon	3:08:54
1982	Black Hills Marathon	Rapid City, South Dakota	3rd	Marathon	2:55:15
1982	Thunder Bay Half Marathon	Thunder Bay, Canada	3rd	Half-Marathon	1:22:18
1982	Twin Cities Marathon	Minneapolis, United States	1st	Marathon	2:43:50
1982	Omaha Marathon	Omaha, Nebraska	1st	Marathon	2:48:45
1983	Mardi Gras Marathon	Metairie, Louisiana	2nd	Marathon	2:53:21
1983	Phoenix Marathon	Phoenix, Arizona	3rd	Marathon	2:53:23

*Citations: World Athletics, American Association of Road Racing Statisticians and the Lincoln Star
