= Central American and Caribbean Cross Country Championships =

Annual Cross country running competition

- Sport: Cross country running
- Founded: 1983
- Continent: Central America and Caribbean (CACAC)

The Central American and Caribbean Cross Country Championships (Spanish: Campeonato Centroamericano y del Caribe de Campo Traviesa) was an annual Cross country running competition organized by the CACAC for athletes representing the countries of its member associations. The competition was established in 1983 following a proposal of Wallace Williams from the Virgin Islands, then secretary of the CACAC. The rationale was that also smaller countries without adequate athletics' facilities could host such an event. The approval for the competitions' implementation was given during the 1982 CACAC meeting in Havana. The first championships were to take place in 1983 on the Virgin Islands, but because of the US invasion of Grenada, the event was postponed and relocated to Puerto Rico.

In the beginning, there were featured races for senior men (about 12 km) and women (6–8 km), and later, from the year 2000 on, also for junior athletes. In addition, there were separate team competitions. The 2000 event was held in conjunction with the South American Cross Country Championships.

== Editions ==
The 2002 edition scheduled for Oranjestad, Aruba, as well as the 2004 edition scheduled for Kingston, Jamaica, were cancelled. Finally, in 2005, the competition was continued as NACAC Cross Country Championships under the auspices of the NACAC.

| Edition | Year | City | Country | Venue | Date | No. of athletes | No. of nations |
|---|---|---|---|---|---|---|---|
| I | 1983 | Salinas | Puerto Rico | | November 27 | | |
| II | 1984 | Devonshire | Bermuda | | December 8 | | |
| III | 1985 | Grand Cayman | Cayman Islands | | December 7 | | |
| IV | 1986 | Curaçao | Netherlands Antilles | | November 23 | | |
| V | 1987 | St. John's | Antigua and Barbuda | | November 23 | | |
| VI | 1988 | Salinas | Puerto Rico | | December 11 | | |
| VII | 1989 | Mandeville | Jamaica | | November 18 | 33 | |
| VIII | 1990 | St. Croix | United States Virgin Islands | Flamboyant Race Track | December 8 | 55 | |
| IX | 1991 | Kingstown | Saint Vincent and the Grenadines | | December 8 | 54 | |
| X | 1992 | Curaçao | Netherlands Antilles | | December 12 | 68 | |
| XI | 1994 | Nassau | Bahamas | | February 12 | 53 | |
| XII | 1995 | Warwick | Bermuda | | February 11 | 46 | |
| XIII | 1996 | Chignahuapan, Puebla | Mexico | | March 25 | 41 | |
| XIV | 1997 | St. George's | Grenada | | February 16 | | |
| XV | 1998 | San José | Costa Rica | Parque Metropolitano La Sabana | March 1 | 80 | 14 |
| XVI | 1999 | Saint Lucia | Saint Lucia | | January 24 | | |
| XVII | 2000 | Cartagena | Colombia | | February 6 | 86 | 9 |
| XVIII | 2001 | Southampton | Bermuda | Point Royal Golf Course | November 17 | | |
| XIX | 2003 | Acapulco, Guerrero | Mexico | Club de Golf Acapulco | March 16 | 80 | 8 |

== Results ==
The results for the Mexican athletes were published by the Federation of Mexican Athletics Associations (FMAA). Further results were compiled from other sources.

=== Men Senior Individual ===
| Year | Gold | | Silver | | Bronze | |
|---|---|---|---|---|---|---|
| 1983 | | | | | Ignacio Melesio (MEX) | 41:11 |
| 1989 | Manuel Manzola (MEX) | 41:28 | | | | |
| 1990 | | | Casimiro Reyes (MEX) | 31:35 | Luciano Flores (MEX) | 31:56 |
| 1991 | | | | | | |
| 1992 | Maurilio Castillo (MEX) | 39:13 | Gustavo Castillo (MEX) | 39:48 | | |
| 1994 | Benjamín Paredes (MEX) | 41:25 | Roberto Alonso (MEX) | 42:00 | Narciso Flores (MEX) | 42:05 |
| 1995 | Santos Ortega Rosario (MEX) | 34:37 | | | Francisco Rodríguez Díaz (MEX) | 35:13 |
| 1996 | Gabino Apolonio (MEX) | 38:06 | Alejandro Cuatepitzi (MEX) | 38:19 | Carlos Peña González (MEX) | 38:45 |
| 1997 | Alejandro Cuatepitzi (MEX) | 38:33 | José Luis Villanueva (MEX) | 38:55 | | |
| 1998 (11.4 km) | Carlos Peña González (MEX) | 34:52 | Alejandro Cuatepitzi (MEX) | 35:02 | Erick Quirós (CRC) | 35:13 |
| 1999 | David Galindo (MEX) | 39:55 | | | Francisco Mondragón (MEX) | 40:32 |
| 2000 (12 km)^{†} | Fidencio Torres (MEX) | 38:40 | Salvador Miranda (MEX) | 38:51 | José Macías Quiroz (MEX) | 39:29 |
| 2001 (11.8 km) | Gustavo Castillo (MEX) | 39:41 | Romualdo Sánchez (MEX) | 39:43 | Jacinto Rodríguez (PUR) | 39:50 |
| 2003 (12 km) | Jonathan Morales (MEX) | 39:43 | José Acierno (MEX) | 39:46 | José Amado García (GUA) | 39:49 |

^{†}: In 2000, the event was held in conjunction with the South American Cross Country Championships, where the medallists were extracted from. Winner was João N'Tyamba from Angola who was invited to participate out of competition in 37:11. Daniel Lopes Ferreira from Brazil came in 2nd in 37:14 to become South American Champion. Silvio Guerra from Ecuador was 3rd in 37:21, Marilson Gomes dos Santos from Brazil was 4th in 37:59, and Benedito Donizeti was 6th in 38:45.

=== Men Senior Team ===
| Year | Gold | | Silver | | Bronze | |
|---|---|---|---|---|---|---|
| 1994 | Mexico | 11 pts | | | | |
| 1995 | Mexico | 14 pts | | | | |
| 1996 | Mexico | 10 pts | | | | |
| 1997 | | | | | | |
| 1998 | Mexico | 14 pts | | | | |
| 1999 | | | Mexico | 39 pts | | |
| 2000 | Mexico | 10 pts | Panama | 66 pts | Jamaica | 67 pts |
| 2001 | Puerto Rico | | Jamaica | | Bermuda | |
| 2003 | Puerto Rico | 29 pts | Jamaica | 48 pts | Aruba | 85 pts |

=== Women Senior Individual ===
| Year | Gold | | Silver | | Bronze | |
|---|---|---|---|---|---|---|
| 1989 | Karla Guerrero (MEX) | 18:41 | | | | |
| 1990 | Angelina Tellez Solís (MEX) | 18:46 | | | | |
| 1991 | | | | | | |
| 1992 | María Luisa Servín (MEX) | 16:09 | Sonia Betancourt (MEX) | 16:12 | Paola Cabrera (MEX) | 16:52 |
| 1994 | Isabel Carreño (MEX) | 19:35 | Lucía Mendiola (MEX) | 19:42 | Esmeralda Guillén (MEX) | 19:48 |
| 1995 | Silvia López (MEX) | 18:43 | Luz María Aguilar (MEX) | 18:43 | | |
| 1996 (6 km) | Isabel Carreño (MEX) | 22:13 | Guadalupe Piña (MEX) | 22:22 | Karla Guerrero (MEX) | 22:45 |
| 1997 (6 km) | Karla Guerrero (MEX) | 22:12 | Noemi Morales (MEX) | 22:15 | Dolores Valencia (MEX) | 22:19 |
| 1998 (5.7 km) | Lucía Mendiola (MEX) | 20:20 | América Mateos (MEX) | 20:25 | Margarita Tapia (MEX) | 20:33 |
| 1999 | | | Margarita Cabello (MEX) | 31:15 | Veronica Sandoval (MEX) | 31:18 |
| 2000 (8 km) | Bertha Sánchez (COL) | 28:10 | América Mateos (MEX) | 28:23 | Mardrea Hyman (JAM) | 28:53 |
| 2001 (7.6 km) | Mireya Ailhaud (MEX) | 31:01 | Esthela Chavez (MEX) | 31:06 | Maribel Burgos (PUR) | 31:08 |
| 2003 (8 km) | Adriana Sánchez (MEX) | 30:02 | Angélica Sánchez (MEX) | 30:24 | Dolores Dávila (MEX) | 30:35 |

=== Women Senior Team ===
| Year | Gold | | Silver | | Bronze | |
|---|---|---|---|---|---|---|
| 1992 | Mexico | 6 pts | | | | |
| 1994 | Mexico | 6 pts | | | | |
| 1995 | | | | | | |
| 1996 | Mexico | 6 pts | | | | |
| 1997 | Mexico | 6 pts | | | | |
| 1998 | Mexico | 6 pts | | | | |
| 1999 | Mexico | 9 pts | | | | |
| 2000 | Mexico | 11 pts | Colombia | 18 pts | Guatemala | 31 pts |
| 2001 | Puerto Rico | | Jamaica | | United States Virgin Islands | |
| 2003 | Mexico | 6 pts | Puerto Rico | 23 pts | United States Virgin Islands | 40 pts |

=== Boys Junior Individual ===
| Year | Gold | | Silver | | Bronze | |
|---|---|---|---|---|---|---|
| 2000 (8 km) | José Luis Santos (MEX) | 25:39 | James Vidal (COL) | 25:41 | Víctor Ocampo (COL) | 26:10 |
| 2001 (7.6 km) | Juan Luis Barrios (MEX) | 25:03 | Félix Camacho (PUR) | 27:35 | Mark Morrison (BER) | 27:38 |
| 2003 (8 km) | Arturo Merced (MEX) | 26:29 | Omar Rabid Guerrero (MEX) | 27:20 | Wainard Talbert (JAM) | 27:40 |

=== Boys Junior Team ===
| Year | Gold | | Silver | | Bronze | |
|---|---|---|---|---|---|---|
| 2000 | Guatemala | 32 pts | Puerto Rico | 56 pts | Jamaica | 59 pts |
| 2001 | Puerto Rico | | Bermuda | | | |
| 2003 | Puerto Rico | 30 pts | Jamaica | 41 pts | Saint Lucia | 56 pts |

=== Girls Junior Individual ===
| Year | Gold | | Silver | | Bronze | |
|---|---|---|---|---|---|---|
| 2000 | Alma Delia Xicoténcatl (MEX) | 22:21 | Luisa Jiménez (COL) | 23:15 | Fabiola Juárez (MEX) | 23:21 |
| 2001 | Carmen Valdés (PUR) | 25:18 | Lysaira del Valle (PUR) | 25:20 | Tamica Thomas (JAM) | 25:40 |
| 2003 (6 km) | Virginia Riverol (MEX) | 22:57 | Arilú Xicontecatl (MEX) | 23:36 | Liliana Méndez (PUR) | 24:05 |

=== Girls Junior Team ===
| Year | Gold | | Silver | | Bronze | |
|---|---|---|---|---|---|---|
| 2000 | Mexico; Colombia | 11 pts | | | Puerto Rico | 26 pts |
| 2001 | | | | | | |
| 2003 | Mexico | 8 pts | Puerto Rico | 18 pts | Jamaica | 23 pts |

== See also ==
- IAAF World Cross Country Championships
- NACAC Cross Country Championships
- South American Cross Country Championships
