= Magdalena Lewy-Boulet =

American runner

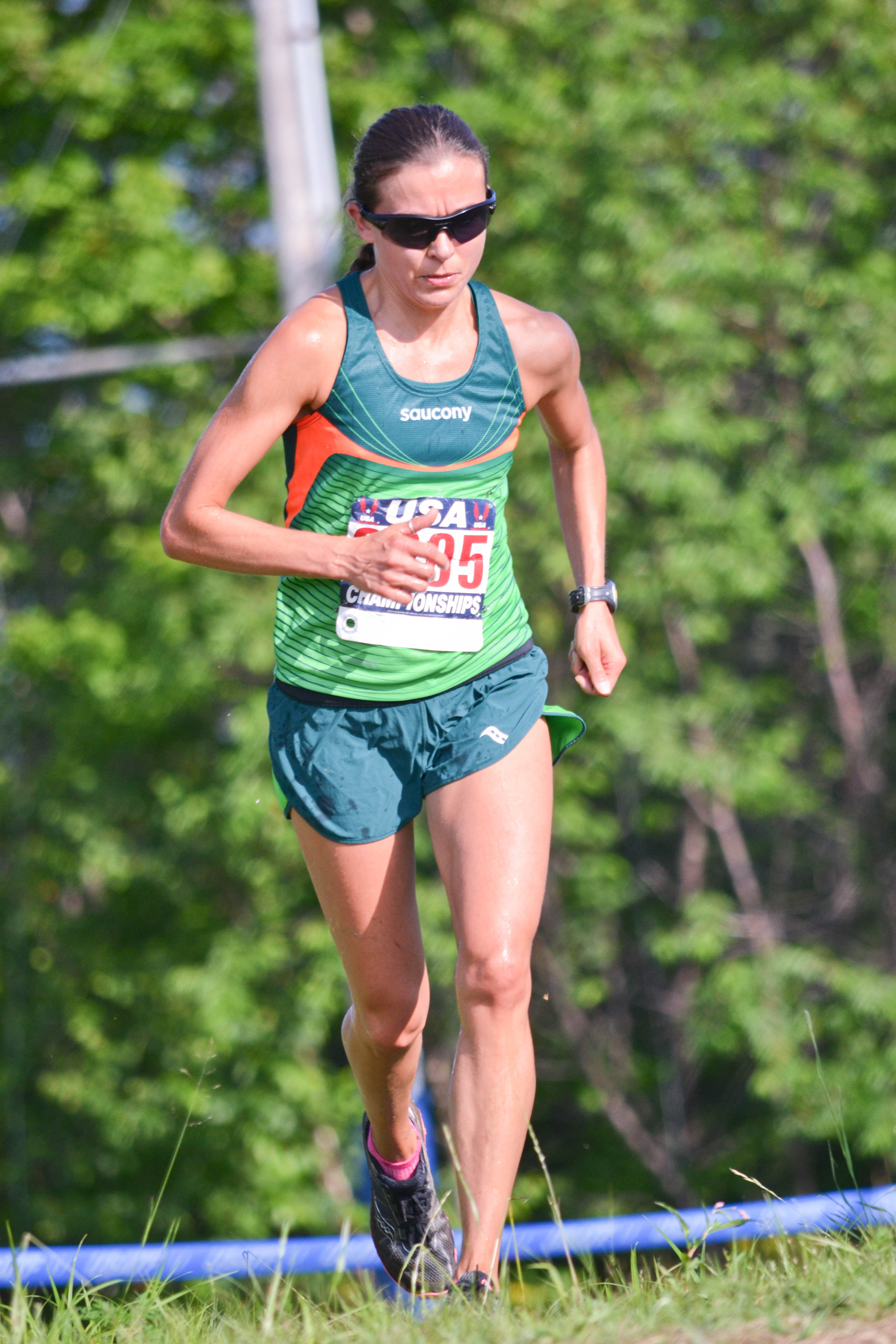
- Magdalena Boulet in 2013
- Born: August 1, 1973 (age 52); Jastrzębie-Zdrój, Poland
- Occupation: runner
- Years active: 2002 - present
- Website: Official website

Magdalena Lewy-Boulet (née Lewy; born August 1, 1973), commonly known as either Magdalena or Magda Boulet, is an American runner from Oakland, California. Born in Jastrzębie-Zdrój, Poland, Lewy-Boulet became a U.S. citizen on September 11, 2001.

== Sport career ==
Lewy Boulet finished second at the 2008 U.S. Olympic Team Trials - Women's Marathon, held on April 20, 2008, in Boston, Massachusetts, in a then personal-best time of 2:30:19. She led the race for the first 24 miles before being overtaken by eventual winner Deena Kastor. During the women's marathon at the 2008 Summer Olympics, a lingering knee injury forced Lewy Boulet to drop out 20 kilometres into the race.

In the IAAF World Cross Country championships, she has earned two bronze medals representing the US in the team competition, in 2010 and 2011. Individually, she finished 20th in the 2010 race and 18th in the 2011 race.

She has also won the 2002 San Francisco Marathon, and finished sixth overall and first among American women at the 2009 New York City Marathon. She finished second at the 2010 Rotterdam Marathon, in a personal best time of 2:26:22. At the 2010 Chicago Marathon, she finished 7th in a time of 2:28:44. In other road racing performances, she was the top American finisher at the NYRR New York Mini 10K, but her time of 33:25 was only enough for eleventh overall. In September, she won the 20K national title at the New Haven Road Race in a time of 1:07:41, some 45 seconds ahead of runner-up Stephanie Rothstein.

She won the Western States 100-Mile Endurance Run in 2015, her debut 100-mile race, in a time of 19:05:21.

In 2019, she won the Leadville 100-mile race, in a time of 20:18:07.

== Personal life and coaching ==
Lewy-Boulet is sponsored by CORE Foods, Hoka One One, and GU Energy Gel. She was assistant track & field coach at University of California - Berkeley, working under Tony Sandoval through 2009-2010 school year. She is married to Richie Boulet, four-time All-American runner for the California Golden Bears track and field program.

Lewy-Boulet was coached by Jack Daniels during her early career, before turning to ultrarunning.

== Achievements ==
- All results regarding marathon, unless stated otherwise

Year	Competition	Venue	Position	Notes
Representing the United States
2002	San Francisco Marathon	San Francisco, United States	1st	2:50:11
2002	Pittsburgh Marathon	Pittsburgh, United States	1st	2:36:48
2003	Pittsburgh Marathon	Pittsburgh, United States	2nd	2:31:38
2006	Orange County Marathon	Newport Beach, United States	1st	2:50:41
2008	Olympic Games	Beijing, PR China	—	DNF
2015	Western States 100	Squaw Valley Ski Resort, California	1st	19:05:21
2016	Ultra-Trail du Mont-Blanc	France, Italy and Switzerland	5th	28:18:05
2017	Western States 100	Squaw Valley Ski Resort, California	2nd	19:49:15
2018	Marathon des Sables	Morocco	1st	25:11:19
2019	The 9 Dragons Ultra	New Territories, Hong Kong	1st	22:18:04
2019	Leadville Trail 100	Leadville, Colorado, United States	1st	20:18:07

== Personal records ==
- 100 miles - 19:05:21 (Western States 100 2015)
- Marathon - 2:26:22 (Rotterdam NED 2010)
- Half Marathon - 1:11:46 (San Jose CA USA 2009)
- 10,000 metres - 31:48.58 (Eugene OR USA 2011)
- 5,000 metres - 15:14.25 (Stockholm SWE 2011)
