= Andrew Musuva =

Kenyan long-distance runner (born 1970)

Andrew Musuva (born January 9, 1970) is a Kenyan long-distance runner and three-time winner of the Twin Cities Marathon.

== Running career ==
Andrew Musuva began running at the age of 20, and he grew up playing soccer. His first marathon was the Pittsburgh Marathon in 1994. In 1999, a bout of malaria forced Musuva to quit in the middle of the 2000 Grandma's Marathon. The illness may have also hindered his success in the 2000 Twin Cities Marathon, where he finished in 10th place.

Musuva's most noteworthy achievement in long-distance running is winning the Twin Cities Marathon for three consecutive years. 1997 was the first year that Musuva won the $20,000 first place purse in the Twin Cities Marathon. Musuva performed well in 1998 and was projected to win the Twin Cities Marathon for a second time. In 1999, Andrew Musuva became the first man to win the Twin Cities Marathon three times in a row. Andrew Musuva has made over $150,000 during his running career.

In an Outside (magazine) story, Musuva chased down an antelope with a team of runners to test the concept of human persistence hunting.

== Early and personal life ==
Andrew Musuva was born in Mitaboni, Kenya. He is the oldest of 8 children, and his father works as a school principal. Musuva lives in Farmington, Minnesota, and coaches a soccer team for children under the age of 10.

== Achievements ==
Year	Competition	Venue	Position	Event	Notes
1994	Pittsburgh Marathon	Pittsburgh, Pennsylvania	3rd	Marathon	2:17:31
1997	Twin Cities Marathon	Minneapolis–Saint Paul, Minnesota	1st	Marathon	2:14:59
1998	Charleston Distance Run	Charleston, South Carolina	1st	15 mile	1:14:01
1998	Twin Cities Marathon	Minneapolis–Saint Paul, Minnesota	1st	Marathon	2:15:19
1998	Rock 'n' Roll San Diego Marathon	San Diego, California	4th	Marathon	2:12:01
1999	Grandma's Marathon	Duluth, Minnesota	1st	Marathon	2:13:21
1999	Twin Cities Marathon	Minneapolis–Saint Paul, Minnesota	1st	Marathon	2:13:41
2002	Quad Cities Marathon	Quad Cities	1st	Marathon	2:21:15
2004	Quad Cities Marathon	Quad Cities	1st	Marathon	2:20:44
2004	Orange County Marathon	Newport Beach, California	1st	Marathon	2:23:23
2005	Carlsbad Marathon	Carlsbad, California	1st	Marathon	2:24:11
