= Naomi Fulton =

American marathon race athlete

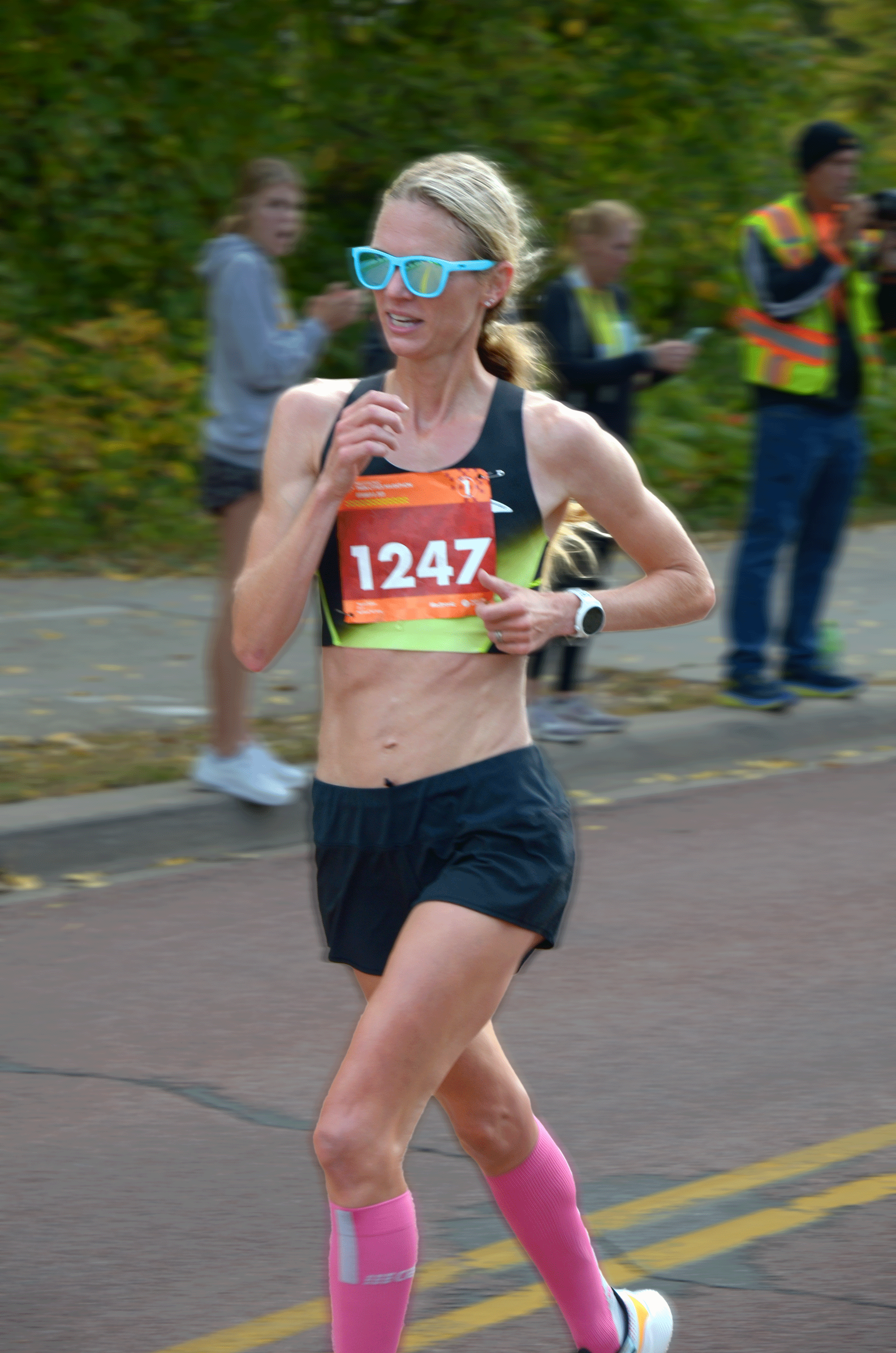
- Fulton running in the 2021 Twin Cities Marathon

Personal information
- Nationality: American
- Born: July 31, 1986 (age 40)

Sport
- Sport: Running
- Event: Marathon
- College team: Parkside Rangers

Naomi Fulton (née Bong, born 1986) is an American athlete and the winner of the 2021 Twin Cities Marathon.

In 2018, she surprised many at the Boston Marathon by finishing 18th—after not being seeded with the elite runners. A month later, Fulton won the Cellcom Green Bay Half Marathon. Fulton qualified for the 2020 United States Olympic Trials Marathon by running the Chicago Marathon in 2018. Previously, she had won the Green Bay Half Marathon in 2015. She was also the winner of the 2009 South Shore Half Marathon and finished in top standings in many other local races.

In 2021, when the Twin Cities Marathon returned after its 2020 cancellation due to the COVID pandemic, Fulton was at the start. Although she wasn't part of the event's seeded start, she gained on the leaders by the half, and then dueled with Elena Hayday before breaking away and finishing first.

== College career ==
Fulton was a nine-time All-American athlete for the University of Wisconsin Parkside Rangers in Somers, Wisconsin, from 2004 to 2008 while she studied education. The school competes in the Great Lakes Valley Conference of NCAA Division III. She competed in the mile and middle-distance events, such as the 3000 meter run, and netted individual Great Lakes Valley Conference track championships.

In 2006, Fulton and her cross country teammates competed at the NCAA Women's Division II Cross Country Championship in Pensacola, Florida. She finished 56th overall, and returned with her team in 2007. At the nationals course in Joplin, Missouri, she improved to 33rd overall.

In March 2008, her senior year, she competed at the NCAA Division II Women's Indoor Track and Field Championships at Minnesota State University, Mankato in Mankato, Minnesota. In the Myers Field house, she raced to a 6th-place finish in the mile behind Jessica Pixler of Seattle Pacific. Adams State won the tournament and the Rangers finished 18th.

In May, Fulton and her teammate Jessica Lamp again competed nationally. They both ran at the NCAA Division II Women's Outdoor Track and Field Championships at Walnut, California's Mt. San Antonio College. Fulton ran the 3,000 meter race, qualifying for the finals and taking eighth.

== High school ==
Along with three teammates from Arrowhead High School, Fulton won the 2002 state DI 4x800 championship, running the anchor leg to finish in 9:22.66. She was a top-25 finisher at the state cross country championship (DI) in 2002.

== Personal life ==
Fulton lives with her husband and children in Wisconsin, where she teaches math and coaches cross country in Hartland-area schools.
