= Twin Cities Marathon =

Annual footrace

- Twin Cities Marathon logo
- Date: First Sunday in October through 2026, October 10 to 17 starting in 2027
- Location: Minneapolis, Minnesota to St. Paul, Minnesota
- Event type: Paved road
- Distance: 26.219 miles (42.195 km)
- Primary sponsor: Medtronic
- Established: October 3, 1982; 44 years ago
- Course records: Men: 2:08:51 (2016); Dominic Ondoro; Women: 2:25:26 (2026); Lilian Chebii
- Website: Medtronic Twin Cities Marathon
- Participants: 8,800

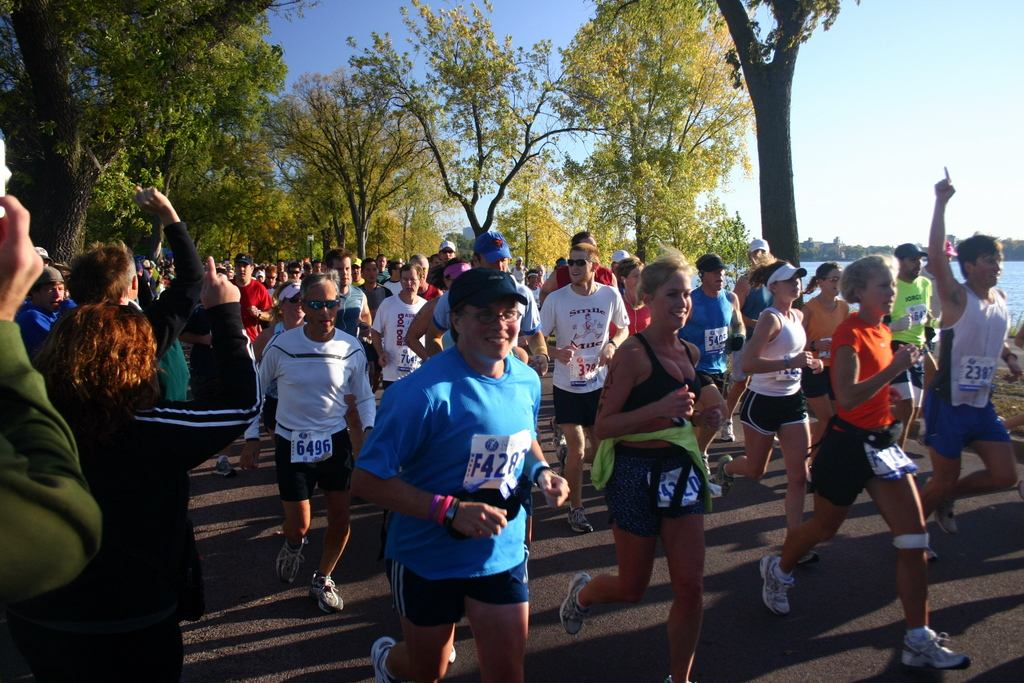
2006 Medtronic Twin Cities Marathon

The Twin Cities Marathon is a marathon in the Minneapolis–Saint Paul area in the United States. It normally takes place the first weekend in October through 2026; starting in 2027, it will occur between October 10 and 17. The race is often called "The Most Beautiful Urban Marathon in America" due to a course that winds through downtown districts, then along parkways that hug lakes and waterways all throughout dense urban forests in the neighborhoods of both cities.

The first Twin Cities marathon took place on October 3, 1982 after Minneapolis and St. Paul combined their separate marathon events. Its earliest predecessor, the Land of Lakes Marathon, began in 1963.

It is one of the top 10 largest marathons in the US by number of finishers. In 2006, the race agreed to its first corporate sponsorship with Medtronic, Inc. The official name of the marathon changed in 2006 to Medtronic Twin Cities Marathon (MTCM).

In addition to the marathon, the MTCM has expanded to a full weekend of events providing opportunities for runners and wheelers of all ages and abilities. Sunday events for adults include the Medtronic TC 10 Mile, or "Shortcut to the Capitol". Medtronic TC Family Events take place on Saturday for children and adults of all ages. Saturday's races include the TC 10K, TC 5K, Diana Pierce Family Mile, Toddler Trot, Diaper Dash, and Mascot Invitational. In addition, Medtronic and the marathon's organizers sponsor a one-mile road race, for anyone from novices to professionals.

In 2006, the Twin Cities Marathon was ranked as the third most competitive marathon for American runners by Running Times magazine.

The event is put on by thousands of volunteers. In 2004, nearly 2,500 volunteers aided the management of the race weekend and the runners.

== History ==
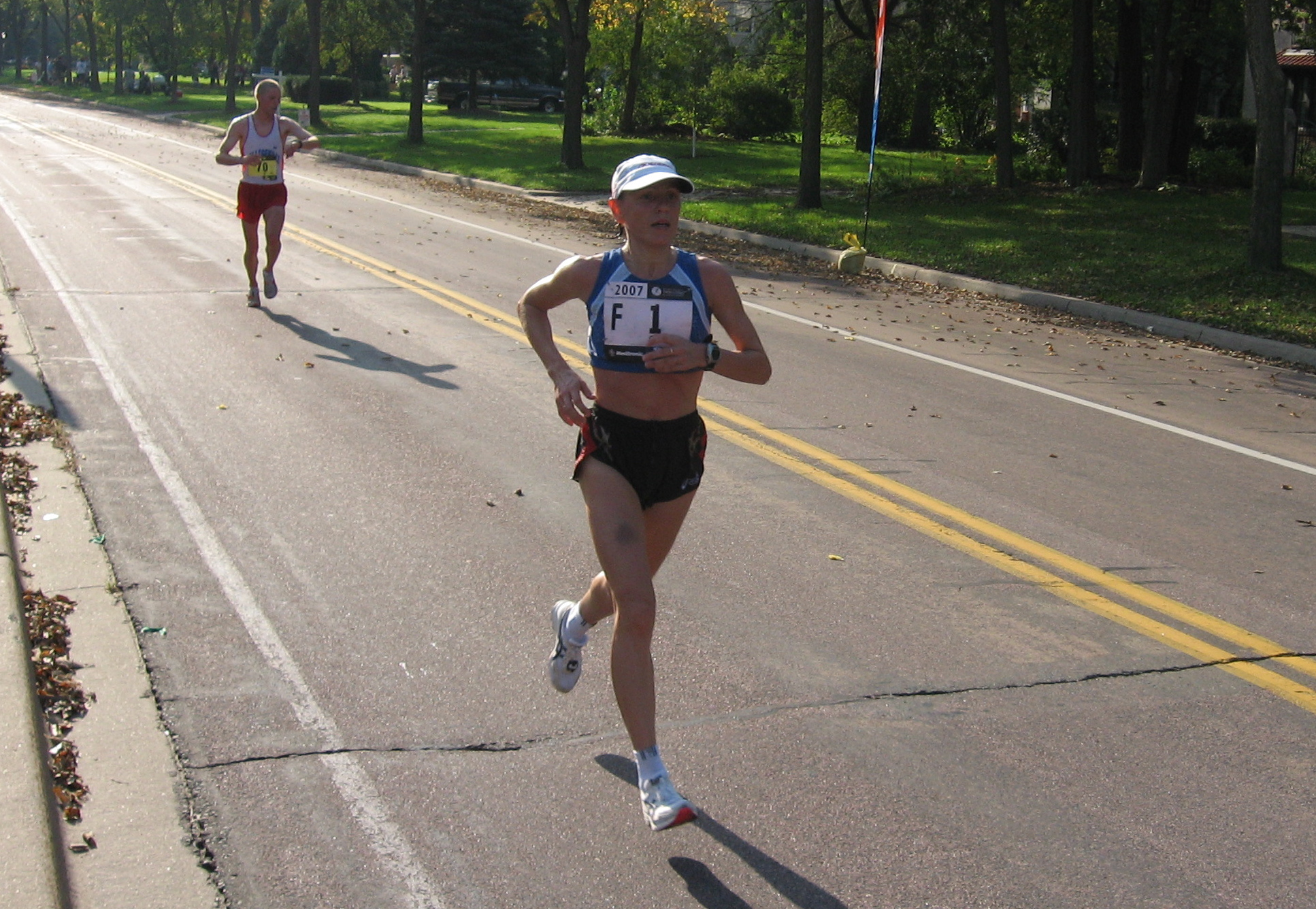
The 2007 women's winner, Svetlana Ponomarenko, leading the race

The Minnesota Distance Running Association (MDRA) created the event's earliest ancestor, originally called the Land of Lakes Marathon (sometimes written as Land O'Lakes Marathon) in 1963. Spectators outnumbered runners that inaugural year as just five participants, all male, began the 26.2 mile trek along Minneapolis' streets and parkways of which only three finished. The Land of Lakes Marathon had a 3 hour 30 minute time cut-off. About 80 runners completed the 1973 Land of Lakes Marathon. The 1974 Land of Lakes Marathon was run in White Bear Lake, Minnesota with 88 runners. The 1975 Land of Lakes Marathon was free to enter and run on a course involving four laps around Bald Eagle Lake and was run by 75 to 100 runners. Tom Heinonen set the Land of Lakes Marathon course record in 1968 with a time of 2:18:29. Until 1972, the Land of Lakes Marathon had no set location. In 1972, Jeff Winters and John Christian took over the event and Winters became sole race director in 1973.

In 1976, the race was renamed the City of Lakes Marathon and moved to a four-lap course around Bde Maka Ska and Lake Harriet and was sponsored by the Minneapolis Park Board and Minnesota Distance Running Association. The City of Lakes Marathon was considered a fast course despite a course record of only 2:19:26 set by Barney Klecker in 1979. By 1981, with the running boom echoing across the country, the race took just a month to fill its limit of 1,700 runners. In the same year, Minneapolis' counterpart established its own marathon, the St. Paul Marathon, which followed a course around Minnesota's capital city. The race launched successfully, drawing approximately 2,000 runners in its first and only running. George Latimer, the mayor of Saint Paul, started the race after having been approached by Garry Bjorklund and Saint Paul Marathon race director Steve Hoag.

In 1982, organizers from the St. Paul and City of Lakes marathons combined efforts to establish the Twin Cities Marathon. Jack Moran, president of the Minnesota Distance Running Association in 1981, realized that a marathon which connected Minneapolis to St. Paul, combining the spectacular autumn beauty of both cities, would be greater attraction than two competing marathons on either side of the Mississippi River. In August 1981, Moran proposed a marathon in Minneapolis and Saint Paul with a budget of $250,000 to the Minnesota Distance Running Association board. The board initially balked, prompting Moran to tender his letter of resignation to the MDRA. The MDRA board reconsidered and provided Moran the go-ahead to put on the 1982 marathon with a budget of $100,000. Dain Bosworth provided by $5,000 of seed funding, which allowed entry forms to be printed. WCCO provided publicity, which Moran credited with bringing on Pillsbury as a corporate sponsor. The race originally started at the last "r" on the Pillsbury Center building (now US Bank Plaza). Bill Spoor, chairman of Pillsbury, fired the starter pistol for the inaugural Twin Cities Marathon.

The inaugural Twin Cities Marathon attracted 4,563 entrants, which established an entry record for a first-time race in the United States and was watched by an estimated 100,000 spectators. Garry Bjorklund was registered but decided not to run due to a sore leg; likewise, Inge Simonsen dropped out of the race at mile 12. It originally finished at Town Square in Saint Paul.

In 1986, Pillsbury announced a five year commitment to increase cash prizes from $160,000 to $300,000 per year.

In 1987, Saint Paul Mayor George Latimer wore a tam o'shanter and awarded laurels to winners at the finish line. In addition, Saint Paul City Council member James Scheibel ran the 1987 Twin Cities Marathon in 2 hours and 45 minutes. Scheibel returned to run the 1989 and 1990 Twin Cities Marathons with a time of 3:19 and 2:57 respectively.

In 1990, the starting line for the Twin Cities Marathon moved from Pillsbury Center to the Metrodome. The main reason for the change was the loss of Pillsbury as a sponsor, but a secondary reason was to comply with The Athletic Congress rules concerning marathon courses.

Also in 1990, Bruce Mortenson, the vice president for runner recruitment, sought to recruit more international talent to compete at the Twin Cities Marathon. This included athletes such as Jon Solly from the UK, Kjell-Erik Ståhl from Sweden, and Mario Cuevas from Mexico. Dave Long from the UK and Eddy Hellebuyck from Belgium were also slated to run by dropped out due to injury and fatigue respectively. Maurilio Castillo from Mexico won the 1990 Twin Cities Marathon.

In 1998, the Twin Cities Marathon used ChampionChip timing chips for the first time after seeing them being successfully used at the St. Patrick's Day Human Race in March of that year.

In 2004, when Irina Permitina finished first for the women, unofficial results showed her finishing with a time of 2:26:53. Permitina, who was back in Minnesota after having been trampled at the start of Grandma's Marathon in June, believed that the time was incorrect. Officials corroborated the four official timing devices to find that her time was actually 2:26:50.7—which was three-tenths of a second faster than the previous record set by fellow Russian, Zinaida Semenova, in 2001. However, marathon race officials round the tenth of a second up to the nearest second, so the time was ruled a tie with the previous record. Permitina submitted a protest, but was denied, the women's course record for the Twin Cities marathon was held by two female runners.

Tim Pawlenty ran the 2004 Twin Cities Marathon, finishing with a time of 3 hours, 57 minutes, and 52 seconds becoming the first sitting governor to run the race.

2007 marked the first year that one of the events hosted a USATF championship. Both the 10 mile race as well as the marathon have been US championships. The years that the races serve as championships, prize money is increased and the field is much deeper. USATF picked the 2009 Twin Cities Marathon to serve as its women's national marathon championship race.

In 2015, Black Lives Matter organizers in Saint Paul, Minnesota planned to disrupt the Twin Cities Marathon to protest a Saint Paul Police Department officer who used excessive force when arresting 15-year old Tyree Tucker at a church picnic. The plan proved polarizing, and Minnesota Governor Mark Dayton offered protesters a gubernatorial meeting instead of disrupting the marathon. Saint Paul Mayor Chris Coleman likewise planned to meet with protest organizers while vowing any effort to disrupt the marathon would result in arrests. On October 1, 2015, Black Lives Matter and Mayor Coleman announced the protest would take place but would not disrupt the marathon.

In 2016, with the demolition of the Metrodome and construction of U.S. Bank Stadium runners were no longer able to use the stadium to stay warm and use the bathrooms before the race.

2017 marked the first time that the 10 mile race (TC10) had more entrants (12,484) than the marathon (9,851).

Twin Cities Marathon and its affiliated races added a non-binary division in 2019, years ahead of the New York City Marathon, Chicago Marathon, London Marathon, and Boston Marathon. Prize money was available in the non-binary division starting in 2022. By 2023, a record of 52 nonbinary runners participated in Twin Cities Marathon-affiliated races.

The 2020 edition of the race was canceled due to the coronavirus pandemic, with all registrants receiving a partial credit for 2021 or 2022. (Note: The partial credit was 40 USD for runners signed up for the marathon. A virtual run took its place.)

The 2023 edition of the race was canceled due to high heat and humidity. As a result, Twin Cities in Motion commissioned a study to consider the possibility of moving the marathon to a later date in the fall. As of 2024, the decision was made to keep the date as-is because moving the date wouldn't lead to significantly better weather outcomes. On July 7, 2026, marathon organizers announced the date would change to October 10 to 17 starting in 2027 to protect the health of runners against hot race conditions.

On October 4, 2026, Lilian Chebii of Kenya broke the women's course record running the race with a time of 2:25:51. Victor Shitsama won the men's race in 2026 with a time of 2:12:20. Minnesota Governor Tim Walz ran the 10 mile race and finished with a time of 1:26:15.

== Course ==
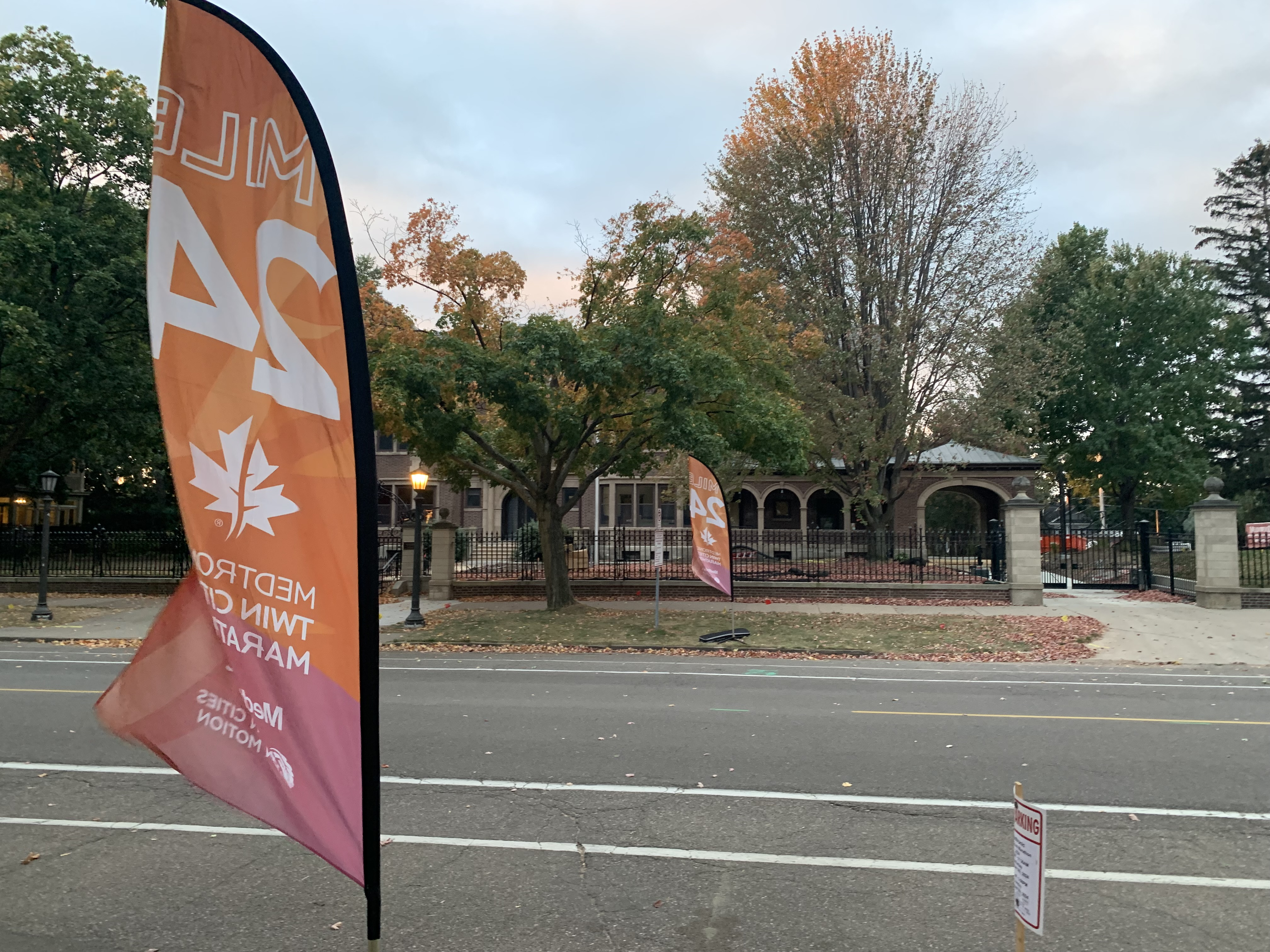
Mile 24 mile marker at the 2024 Twin Cities Marathon

The course begins near U.S. Bank Stadium in downtown Minneapolis, and winds around several of the city's well-known lakes (including Lake of the Isles, Bde Maka Ska (the lake formerly known as Calhoun), Lake Harriet, and Lake Nokomis) before turning north along the banks of the Mississippi River. The course follows the river for several miles before crossing into Saint Paul, and then proceeds east up Summit Avenue to finish at the Minnesota State Capitol. The course proceeds steadily uphill from 21 miles (34 km) to 23 miles (37 km), and is considered among the more challenging finishes among American marathons, although the downhill last half-mile allows for relatively strong finishes.

== Winners ==
=== Marathon ===
Course record

Men's race
Year	Winner	Nationality	Time (h:m:s)
1982	Allan Zachariasen	Denmark	2:11:49
1983	Allan Zachariasen	Denmark	2:13:20
1984	Fred Torneden	United States	2:11:35
1985	Phil Coppess	United States	2:10:05
1986	Bill Donakowski	United States	2:10:41
1987	Marty Froelick	United States	2:10:59
1988	Danny Boltz	Australia	2:14:10
1989	Don Janicki	United States	2:12:18
1990	Maurilio Castillo	Mexico	2:11:01
1991	Malcolm Norwood	Australia	2:12:10
1992	David Mungai	United States	2:15:33
1993	Ed Eyestone	United States	2:14:34
1994	Pablo Sierra	Spain	2:11:35
1995	Rafael Zepeda	Mexico	2:15:09
1996	Joel Onwonga	Kenya	2:13:13
1997	Andrew Musuva	Kenya	2:14:59
1998	Andrew Musuva	Kenya	2:15:19
1999	Andrew Musuva	Kenya	2:13:41
2000	Sergei Fedotov	Russia	2:12:40
2001	Joshua Kipkemboi	United States	2:14:07
2002	Dan Browne	United States	2:11:35
2003	~~Eddy Hellebuyck~~	United States	2:12:47 *
2004	Augustus Mbusya Kavutu	Kenya	2:13:33
2005	Mbarak Hussein	United States	2:18:28
2006	Mbarak Hussein	United States	2:13:51
2007	Mykola Antonenko	Ukraine	2:13:54
2008	Fernando Cabada	United States	2:16:32
2009	Jason Hartmann	United States	2:12:16
2010	Sergio Reyes	United States	2:14:02
2011	Sammy Malakwen	Kenya	2:13:11
2012	Christopher Kipyego	Kenya	2:14:53
2013	Nicholas Arciniaga	United States	2:13:12
2014	Tyler Pennel	United States	2:13:32
2015	Dominic Ondoro	Kenya	2:11:16
2016	Dominic Ondoro	Kenya	2:08:51
2017	Dominic Ondoro	Kenya	2:11:53
2018	Elisha Barno	Kenya	2:11:58
2019	Dominic Ondoro	Kenya	2:12:23
2020	Canceled due to coronavirus pandemic		
2021	Mohamed Hrezi	Libya	2:15:22
2022	Yuya Yoshida	Japan	2:11:28
2023	Canceled due to heat and humidity		
2024	Shadrack Kimining	Kenya	2:10:17

- * = Doping violation: Tested positive for banned substance EPO (Erythropoietin)

Women's race
Year	Winner	Nationality	Time (h:m:s)
1982	Sally Brent	United States	2:43:50
1983	Gabriele Anderson	Switzerland	2:36:22
1984	Debbie Mueller	United States	2:34:50
1985	Janice Ettle	United States	2:35:47
1986	Kim Rosenquist	United States	2:32:11
1987	Sylvie Bornet	France	2:30:11
1988	Ria Van Landeghem	Belgium	2:28:11
1989	Kim Jones	United States	2:31:42
1990	Sylvie Bornet	France	2:29:22
1991	Janis Klecker	United States	2:30:31
1992	Janis Klecker	United States	2:36:50
1993	Lisa Weidenbach	United States	2:33:38
1994	Suzana Ciric	Yugoslavia	2:34:04
1995	Gwyn Coogan	United States	2:32:58
1996	Olga Appell	United States	2:27:59
1997	Lyubov Morgunova	Russia	2:30:43
1998	Zinaida Semenova	Russia	2:32:06
1999	Kim Pawelek	United States	2:37:56
2000	Zinaida Semenova	Russia	2:29:37
2001	Zinaida Semenova	Russia	2:26:51
2002	Irina Bogachova	Kyrgyzstan	2:29:39
2003	Blake Russell	United States	2:30:41
2004	Irina Permitina	Russia	2:26:51
2005	Nicole Aish	United States	2:40:21
2006	Marla Runyan	United States	2:32:15
2007	Svetlana Ponomarenko	Russia	2:34:09
2008	Olga Glok	Russia	2:32:28
2009	Ilsa Paulson	United States	2:31:49
2010	Buzunesh Deba	Ethiopia	2:27:23
2011	Yeshimebet Bifa	Ethiopia	2:27:23
2012	Jeannette Faber	United States	2:32:37
2013	Annie Bersagel	United States	2:30:52
2014	Esther Erb	United States	2:34:01
2015	Serkalem Biset Abrha	Ethiopia	2:31:39
2016	Jane Kibii	Kenya	2:30:01
2017	Jane Kibii	Kenya	2:30:25
2018	Sinke Biyadgilgn	Ethiopia	2:33:04
2019	Julia Kohnen	United States	2:31:29
2020	Canceled due to coronavirus pandemic		
2021	Naomi Fulton	United States	2:45:55
2022	Jessica Watychowicz	United States	2:33:09
2023	Canceled due to heat and humidity		
2024	Molly Bookmyer	United States	2:28:52

Nonbinary race
Year	Winner	Nationality	Time (h:m:s)
2022	Jonah Grant	United States	2:41:04
2023	Canceled due to heat and humidity		
2024	Daniel Deuhs	United States	3:18:03

=== TC 10 Mile ===
Key: Course record USATF 10 Mile Championship

Edition	Year	Men's winner	Time (m:s)	Women's winner	Time (m:s)
1	1999	Charlie Mahler (USA)	52:01	Kelly Keeler (USA)	57:13
2	2000	Mark Elworthy (USA)	52:02	Bonnie Sons (USA)	1:00:17
3	2001	Dan Simmons (USA)	52:53	Katie McGregor (USA)	57:20
4	2002	Eric Johnson (USA)	51:40	Katie McGregor (USA)	55:48
5	2003	Chris Lundstrom (USA)	50:46	Katie McGregor (USA)	54:28
6	2004	Chad Johnson (USA)	48:42	Sara Wells (USA)	57:10
7	2005	Moses Waweru (USA)	50:48	Katie McGregor (USA)	55:09
8	2006	Matthew Gabrielson (USA)	48:54	Katie McGregor (USA)	53:51
9	2007^{†}	Abdihakim Abdirahman (USA)	47:34	Kristen Nicolini (USA)	56:26
10	2008^{‡}	Josh Glaab (USA)	50:27	Kara Goucher (USA)	53:16
11	2009^{†}	Abdihakim Abdirahman (USA)	46:35	Rachel Booth (USA)	57:32
12	2010^{‡}	Matt Downin (USA)	50:43	Katie McGregor (USA)	54:21
13	2011	Mohamed Trafeh (USA)	46:46	Janet Cherobon-Bawcom (USA)	54:15
14	2012	Benjamin True (USA)	47:19	Janet Cherobon-Bawcom (USA)	53:43
15	2013	Jonathan Peterson (USA)	49:03	Laura Paulsen (USA)	58:47
16	2014	Jonathan Peterson (USA)	48:12	Allison Mendez (USA)	56:27
17	2015	Samuel Chelanga (USA)	46:47	Molly Huddle (USA)	51:44
18	2016	Samuel Chelanga (USA)	47:25	Jordan Hasay (USA)	52:49
19	2017	Shadrack Kipchirchir (USA)	47:33	Sara Hall (USA)	53:43
20	2018	Shadrack Kipchirchir (USA)	46:32	Sara Hall (USA)	52:47
21	2019	Futsum Zienasellassie (USA)	46:55	Sara Hall (USA)	53:11
-	2020	Canceled due to COVID-19 pandemic			
22	2021	Daniel Docherty (USA)	49:19	Rachel Drake (USA)	56:40
23	2022	Connor Reck (USA)	49:35	Heather Kampf (USA)	54:17
-	2023	Canceled due to heat and humidity			
24	2024	Conner Mantz (USA)	45:13	Natosha Rogers (USA)	52:29
25	2025	Yemane Haileselassi (USA)	46:24	Mercy Chelangat (USA)	52:04

^{†} Men's championship only. ^{‡} Women's championship only

== See also ==
- Grandma's Marathon
- Minneapolis Marathon
