= Mbarak Hussein =

Kenyan long-distance runner

Personal information
- Full name: Mbarak Kipkorir Hussein
- Nationality: Kenyan (until 2004); American (from 2004)
- Born: 4 April 1965 (age 61) Kapsabet, Kenya
- Home town: Albuquerque, New Mexico, United States
- Education: Lubbock Christian University

Sport
- Country: Kenya (until 2004); United States (2004–present)
- Sport: Athletics
- Event(s): Long-distance running, Marathon

Achievements and titles
- Personal best(s): Half marathon: 1:01:27 (2000); Marathon: 2:08:10 (2004)
Medal record
Men's athletics
Representing Kenya
Marathons
Gold medal – first place	1998 Honolulu	Marathon
Gold medal – first place	2001 Honolulu	Marathon
Gold medal – first place	2002 Honolulu	Marathon
Representing United States
Marathons
Gold medal – first place	2005 Twin Cities	Marathon
Gold medal – first place	2006 Twin Cities	Marathon

Mbarak Kipkorir Hussein (born 4 April 1965) is a Kenyan athlete who specialises in long distance running, including the marathon. Having been a resident of Albuquerque since 1987, he obtained United States citizenship in 2004 and began representing the US internationally in 2007.

== Career ==
A native of Kapsabet, near Eldoret, Kenya, he was a late comer to competitive running but he was inspired by the feats of his older brother, Ibrahim Hussein, who is a three-time Boston Marathon winner. Mbarak began his career as a middle-distance runner, winning junior titles in track and cross country running, and also winning titles in the 800 and 1500 meters while at Lubbock Christian University. However, Hussein's greatest achievements came after the age of 30, when he began to focus on road running.

Following in the footsteps of his brother, he won the Honolulu Marathon, winning the 1998 race with a time of 2:14:53. He returned the following year but managed only third position, although a second-place finish at the Rock 'n' Roll San Diego Marathon saw him improve his best time by over four minutes. A sole third place in Honolulu was the highlight of 2000, but the following year he competed in the Boston Marathon for the first time, finishing fifth. In 2001, he won the Stride for Pride 5K, the Duke City 5K, the Long Beach Half-Marathon, and he closed the year with a second win at the Honolulu Marathon. Multiple victories also highlighted 2002: he finished in first place at America’s Finest City Half-Marathon, took the inaugural marathon title at the JoongAng Seoul Marathon, and won in Honolulu for a third time.

He finished fourth at the Seoul International Marathon and second in Honolulu in 2003, but he rebounded in 2004 by setting a personal best of 2:08:10 for third at the Dong-A Marathon and again taking third in South Korea with a fast time at the JoongAng Marathon. Following his successful application for US citizenship, he competed in his first American national marathon championships, held at the Twin Cities Marathon, and he won two years running in 2005 and 2006. He became eligible to compete internationally for his adopted country the year after and he took part in the 2007 World Championships in Athletics. In the world championship marathon final, he finished in 21st place with 2:23:04; his time was hampered by difficult weather conditions in Osaka but he was the United States' strongest performer in the race and headed the American team to fourth place in the Marathon World Cup. He now coaches Sandia High School Cross-Country and Track and Field in Albuquerque.

== Achievements ==
Year	Competition	Venue	Position	Event	Notes
Representing Kenya
1997	World Championships	Athens, Greece	—	Marathon	DNF
1998	Honolulu Marathon	Honolulu, Hawaii	1st	Marathon	2:14:53
2001	Honolulu Marathon	Honolulu, Hawaii	1st	Marathon	2:15:09
2002	Boston Marathon	Boston, United States	4th	Marathon	2:09:45
2002	Honolulu Marathon	Honolulu, Hawaii	1st	Marathon	2:12:29
2005	Twin Cities Marathon	Minneapolis, United States	1st	Marathon	2:18:28
2006	Twin Cities Marathon	Minneapolis, United States	1st	Marathon	2:13:51
2007	World Championships	Osaka, Japan	21st	Marathon	2:23:04

== Personal bests ==
Event	Time (h:m:s)	Venue	Date
Half marathon	1:01:27	Philadelphia, Pennsylvania, United States	September 17, 2000
Marathon	2:08:10	Seoul, South Korea	March 14, 2004

- All information taken from IAAF profile.
