= Molly Bookmyer =

American long-distance runner (born 1991)

Personal information
- Born: February 4, 1991 (age 34) Brecksville, Ohio
- Home town: Columbus, Ohio, United States
- Education: Brecksville–Broadview Heights High School, Ohio State University

Sport
- Country: United States
- Club: Oiselle Underbird Team
- Coached by: James McKirdy

Molly Bookmyer (born Molly Jacobsen) is an American long-distance runner. She has twice qualified for the US Olympic marathon trials.

== College ==
Bookmyer was a walk-on cross-country and track athlete at Ohio State University. She ran cross country for three years and track for two, where she focused on the steeplechase.

== Professional career ==
In 2024, Bookmyer won the Twin Cities Marathon and set a new marathon personal best time of 2:28:52.

Bookmyer qualified for the 2024 US Olympic marathon trials by running a 2:30:37 at the 2023 Toronto Waterfront Marathon. She had hoped to run have a break-through race and run 2:27, but was well-within the qualifying standard of 2:37. At the Olympic marathon trials, Bookmyer dropped out after 12 miles.

Bookmyer ran the 2021 New York City Marathon but did not finish due to a lingering injury.

Bookmyer qualified for the 2020 United States Olympic marathon trials by running a 2:44:07 at the Chevron Houston Marathon in 2019. However, she was unable to race as she was diagnosed as having a femoral neck stress fracture the week before the trials.

== Personal life ==
Bookmyer married her husband Eric in 2017. Her husband was diagnosed with cancer, and Bookmyer took time off running as a result. However, Bookmyer started running again as a means to reduce stress but quickly regained her competitive drive and set out to qualify for the 2020 US Olympic marathon trials to honor her husband.

At the age of 25, Bookmyer was diagnosed with a non-cancerous brain tumor and has since undergone two brain surgeries.

== Achievements ==
Year	Competition	Venue	Position	Event	Notes
2024	Twin Cities Marathon	Minneapolis, Minnesota to Saint Paul, Minnesota	1st	Marathon	2:28:52
2024	Grandma's Marathon	Two Harbors, Minnesota to Duluth, Minnesota	3rd	Marathon	2:30:16
2024	Dicks Sporting Goods Pittsburgh Marathon	Pittsburgh, Pennsylvania	2nd	Half Marathon	1:12:17
2023	Toronto Waterfront Marathon	Toronto, Ontario	8th	Marathon	2:30:37
2022	Nationwide Children's Hospital Columbus Marathon	Columbus, Ohio	1st	Half Marathon	1:10:51
2022	Grandma's Marathon	Two Harbors, Minnesota to Duluth, Minnesota	7th	Marathon	2:32:53
2022	USATF 25K Championships	Grand Rapids, Michigan	6th	25 km	1:28:40
2022	Chevron Houston Marathon	Houston, Texas	9th	Marathon	2:33:19
2021	Nationwide Children's Hospital Columbus Marathon	Columbus, Ohio	1st	Half Marathon	1:12:29
2021	Van Wert 4 Mile	Van Wert, Ohio	1st	4 mile	20:43.95
2019	Amway River Bank Run	Grand Rapids, Michigan	3rd	25 km	1:27:26
2019	OhioHealth Capital City Half Marathon	Columbus, Ohio	1st	Half Marathon	1:13:28
2019	Chevron Houston Marathon	Houston, Texas	31st	Marathon	2:44:07
2018	OhioHealth Capital City Half Marathon	Columbus, Ohio	1st	Half Marathon	1:19.05
