= Athletics at the 1995 Pan American Games – Men's marathon =

Men's marathon at the Pan American Games

The men's marathon event at the 1995 Pan American Games was held in Mar del Plata on 25 March.

== Results ==
Rank	Name	Nationality	Time	Notes
1st place, gold medalist(s)	Benjamín Paredes	Mexico	2:14:44	
2nd place, silver medalist(s)	Mark Coogan	United States	2:15:21	
3rd place, bronze medalist(s)	Luiz Carlos da Silva	Brazil	2:15:46	
4	Rubén Maza	Venezuela	2:16:18	
5	Alberto Cuba	Cuba	2:16:29	
6	Maurilio Castillo	Mexico	2:16:46	
7	Carlos Tarazona	Venezuela	2:17.59	
8	Luis Martínez	Guatemala	2:18:11	
9	Alexis Cuba	Cuba	2:18:26	
10	Ángel Vizcarrondo	Puerto Rico	2:19:54	
11	Tranquilino Valenzuela	Argentina	2:20:19	
12	José Villagra	Argentina	2:21:55	
13	Juan Zuñiga	Costa Rica	2:23:50	
14	César Mercado	Puerto Rico	2:25:38	
15	Gilberto Torres	Peru	2:26:47	
16	Eddy Punina	Ecuador	2:28:38	
17	Policarpio Calizaya	Bolivia	2:30:41	
18	Humberto Hermosilla	Paraguay	2:39:28	
19	Marlon Williams	United States Virgin Islands	2:44:03	
	Jerry Lawson	United States	DNF	
	Rolando Vera	Ecuador	DNF	
	Artur Castro de Freitas	Brazil	DNF	
	Toribio Gutiérrez	Argentina	DNF	
	Jesse Mulcaire	Saint Kitts and Nevis	DNF	
	Miguel Mallqui	Peru	DNS	
