= Yeshimebet Bifa =

Ethiopian long-distance runner (born 1988)

Yeshimebet Tadesse Bifa (born 15 October 1988) is an Ethiopian long-distance runner who has run a personal best in the marathon of 2:26:18 hours.

Yeshimebet Bifa ran her fastest marathon (2:26:18) to finish third in the 69th Seoul International Marathon March 17. Her major marathon in came in 2011, when she took home the first-place prize at the Twin Cities Marathon (which amounted to $15,000), finishing in 2:28:24. She originally hoped to get a better finishing time but she was pleased with her run. She said that "I had initially planned to run under 2:26. I ran the time I ran because I was uncontested the last few miles; I was 1 1/2 minutes ahead of the pack. I'm grateful for having run as quickly as God willed."

During the 34th Grandma's Marathon, she came in second to the 22-year-old Bizunesh Deba. Both runners were met by a strong headwind that made the race that much more difficult. Yeshimebet took second place to Bizunesh after trailing her for 21 miles and finishing with a time of 2:27:45. Both of the runners are from Ethiopia and have made many appearances in races but Yeshimebet did not know her until this marathon. The two later got to know each other.

== Achievements ==
In 2010, Bifa placed third in the Milan Marathon in Italy in a time of 2:36:04.

In 2013, Bifa placed third in the Beijing Marathon in 2:35:20.

In 2016, she placed seventh in the Dubai Marathon in the UAE with a time of 2:27:45.

In 2018, Bifa finished third in the Sofia Marathon in Bulgaria with a time of 2:35:21.
