= Julia Kohnen Griffey =

American long-distance runner

Personal information
- Born: July 29, 1992 (age 33) Florissant, Missouri, United States
- Home town: St Louis, Missouri
- Height: 5 ft 5 in (165 cm)
- Website: https://www.neseliteconsulting.com/julia-kohnen

Sport
- Event(s): Marathon, 10000 m
- College team: Southern Indiana Screaming Eagles
- Club: Hoka One One Northern Arizona Elite
- Coached by: Jason Holroyd; 2015-2020; Ben Rosario; 2020-2023

Achievements and titles
- National finals: NCAA cross-country NCAA 10,000 m (outdoors); NCAA 5,000 m (indoors); NCAA 5,000 m (outdoors)
- Personal best(s): 1500 meters: 4:39.34; 5000 meters: 16:47.61; 10,000 meters: 34:45.08; Half Marathon: 1:11:04; Marathon: 2:29:58

Julia Kohnen Griffey (née Kohnen, born July 29, 1992) is an American professional marathon runner who trained with HOKA's NAZ Elite team from 2020 to 2022.

== College career ==
Kohnen Griffey attended high school at Incarnate Word Academy, an all-girls private school in Missouri, where she played soccer and basketball. She also played on a club soccer team.

She went on to study business at University of Southern Indiana in Evansville, Indiana, where she played soccer for the Screaming Eagles. She transitioned to running cross country and track and field in 2014.

As a senior, she finished 11th at the 2014 NCAA Women's Division II Cross Country Championship in Louisville, Kentucky.

In the fall, she ran to an 8th-place finish in the 2015 indoor championship in the 5,000 meters in a time of 17:04. Her college career finished in Allendale, Michigan at the Outdoor Track and Field National Championships for DII schools where she took 5th in the 5,000 in 16:47.61 (a Screaming Eagles record) and then dueled with Amy Cymerman of Grand Valley State Lakers in the 10,000. Kohnen finished second in 34:45, setting the Screaming Eagles record time for the distance.

She graduated with an MBA in 2015.

== Professional career ==
As a relatively unknown runner who was working full-time at Panera Bread, Kohnen surprised many when she won the 2019 Twin Cities Marathon, from Minneapolis to St. Paul, Minnesota. She clocked an average 5:47 minute-per-mile pace to cross the finish line in 2:31:29.

Before her win in Minnesota, she raced the 2017 Chicago Marathon, finishing in 2:39:11 for 17th, which qualified her for the 2020 Olympic Trials Marathon race. She had also run and won several half marathons and the 2015 Mo' Cowbell Missouri Marathon.

In February 2020, Kohnen ran in the 2020 Woman's Olympic Trials Marathon, in Atlanta, Georgia. She finished 10th with a time of 2:30:43.

In August 2021, as the COVID-19 pandemic restrictions eased, Boston Athletic Association announced that the 2021 Boston Marathon (which had been postponed to the fall) would host an elite field of 54, which included Kohnen Griffey.

At the 2022 California International Marathon, which hosted the USATF Marathon Championship, she ran with leaders and finished in 2:30:35 for 10th place as Paige Stoner took the win.

== Personal life ==
Julia Kohnen and Tyler Griffey married May 2021.
