= Zinaida Semenova =

Russian long-distance runner

Zinaida Semenova (Russian: Зинаида Семёнова; born 19 March 1962) is a retired female long-distance runner from Russia. She set her personal best in the women's marathon on October 7, 2001, in Saint Paul, Minnesota, clocking 2:26:51. Semenova is a three-time winner of the annual Twin Cities Marathon and the shared woman's course record holder along with Irina Permitina, who also ran an official time of 2:26:51 in 2004.

== Achievements ==
Year	Competition	Venue	Position	Event	Notes
Representing Russia
1998	Twin Cities Marathon	Saint Paul, United States	1st	Marathon	2:32:06
1999	World Championships	Seville, Spain	29th	Marathon	2:41:33
2000	Twin Cities Marathon	Saint Paul, United States	1st	Marathon	2:29:37
2001	Twin Cities Marathon	Saint Paul, United States	1st	Marathon	2:26:51
2002	Grandma's Marathon	Duluth, United States	1st	Marathon	2:32:21
2005	Dublin Marathon	Dublin, Ireland	1st	Marathon	2:32:53
