= Maurilio Castillo =

Mexican long-distance runner

Personal information
- Born: 1 December 1962 (age 62)

Sport
- Sport: Track and field

Maurilio Castillo (born 1 December 1962) is a Mexican male former long-distance runner who specialised in the marathon. He represented his country at the 1991 World Championships in Athletics and finished seventh there. He holds a personal best of 2:10:47 hours set when he finished third at the Tokyo International Marathon. He was the 1992 winner at the Central American and Caribbean Cross Country Championships. Castillo also competed at the 1995 Pan American Games.

On the professional circuit he was the winner at the Twin Cities Marathon in 1990 and the Beppu-Ōita Marathon in 1993. He had top three finishes at the Turin Marathon, Amsterdam Marathon, Barcelona Marathon and San Diego Marathon. He also finished in the top ten at the 1995 Chicago Marathon, 1993 Beijing Marathon, 1992 London Marathon and 1991 Rotterdam Marathon.

== International competitions ==
Year	Competition	Venue	Position	Event	Notes
1991	World Championships	Tokyo, Japan	7th	Marathon	2:16.15
1992	Central American and Caribbean Cross Country Championships	Curaçao, Netherlands Antilles	1st	Senior race	39:13
1995	Pan American Games	Mar del Plata, Mexico	7th	Marathon	2:16.46
