= Charleston Distance Run =

Annual running race in Charleston, US

Coordinates: 38°20′7.6″N 81°36′45.6″W

The Charleston Distance Run is a 15-mile (24 km) road running event held annually in Charleston, West Virginia. The race starts in front of the West Virginia State Capitol on the Kanawha Boulevard. The course starts on the flats of the Boulevard before going across the South Side Bridge and up Corridor G, a hill named Capital Hill Punishment for its nearly 2-mile (3 km) uphill length. The course winds through Charleston's South Hills for 3 miles (5 km) before crossing back over the South Side Bridge. The final 7 miles (11 km) are flat; runners go past the West Virginia State Capitol, along the Kanawha River, before finishing at Laidley Field.

== History ==
The race was started in 1973 by Don Cohen, an eye doctor in Charleston. Cohen wanted to create a race that coincided with the annual Sternwheel Regatta, so he teamed up with city leaders and police to find a route.

The race ended up being 15 miles (24 km) quite by accident, as Cohen's main focus was to orientate the race around some of Charleston's most famous landmarks, such as the State Capitol, the Kanawha riverbank, the East End, West Side, and South Hills. Though the Sternwheel Regatta retired in 2008, the Distance Run continues as an independent event. To this day, it is America's only 15-mile distance run.

== Past overall winners ==
Year	Name	Club/Hometown	Time
1973	Jeff Galloway	Florida Track Club	1:16:29
1974	Philip Ndoo	Eastern New Mexico University	1:18:03
1975	John Vitale	No data	1:17:02
1976	Frank Shorter	Independent	1:14:37
1977	William R. Haviland	Ohio	1:16:42
1978	William R. Haviland	Athens, Ohio	1:14:26
1979	Robert V. Perkins	Greensboro, North Carolina	1:17:37
1980	William R. Haviland	Athens, Ohio	1:15:12
1981	Terry Baker	No data	1:15:43
1982	Terry Baker	No data	1:14:15
1983	Mark S. Stickley	Blacksburg, Virginia	1:14:02
1984	Mark S. Stickley	Blacksburg, Virginia	1:14:33
1985	Steve G. Taylor	No data	1:16:25
1986	Don L. Norman	No data	1:13:54
1987	Steve G. Taylor	No data	1:14:31
1988	Don L. Norman	No data	1:15:52
1989	Steve G. Taylor	No data	1:15:27
1990	Mark L. Curp	No data	1:13:47
1991	Mark L. Curp	No data	1:16:50
1992	Mark L. Curp	No data	1:15:40
1993	Ed Eyestone	No data	1:14:52
1994	Gideon M. Mutisya	No data	1:13:38
1995	Gideon M. Mutisya	No data	1:12:55
1996	Gideon M. Mutisya	New Milford, Connecticut	1:12:24
1997	Gideon M. Mutisya	Incline Village, Nevada	1:16:34
1998	Andrew Musuva	Farmington, Minnesota	1:14:01
1999	Simon Sawe	Albuquerque, New Mexico	1:14:53
2000	Gideon M. Mutisya	Hartford, Connecticut	1:15:30
2001	Wilson Onscare	West Chester, Pennsylvania	1:14:47
2002	Zabloh Mokaya	Kennesaw, Georgia	1:15:07
2003	Hillary Lelei	Cary, North Carolina	1:16:06
2004	Douglas Momanyi	West Chester, Pennsylvania	1:17:08
2005	Francis Bowen	West Chester, Pennsylvania	1:15:31
2006	Jacob Yator	Chapel Hill, North Carolina	1:15:21
2007	Tesfaye Girma	West Chester, Pennsylvania	1:16:26
2008	Gideon M. Mutisya	Hartford, Connecticut	1:22:48
2009	Kipyegon Kirui	Chapel Hill, North Carolina	1:14:55
2010	Jason Pyles	South Charleston, West Virginia	1:25:44
2011	Joe Moore	Raleigh, North Carolina	1:20:12
2012	Jeff Weiss	Ravenswood, West Virginia	1:21:14
2013	Kiprono Kurgat	Chapel Hill, North Carolina	1:16:29
2014	Jeff Weiss	Ravenswood, West Virginia	1:22:36
2015	Brian Moresman	No data	1:22:13
2016	Juris Silenieks	Pittsburgh, Pennsylvania	1:21:42
2017	Jason Pyles	Elkins, West Virginia	1:31:48
2018	Bryan Morseman	Bath, New York	1:23:45
2019	Daniel Jaskowak	Blacksburg, Virginia	1:20:12
2020	CANCELED DUE TO COVID-19		
2021	Jack Mastandrea	Mooresville, North Carolina	1:16:16
2022	Caleb Bowen	Huntington, West Virginia	1:22:46
