= Sports in Phoenix =

Sports in Phoenix include several professional sports franchises, and until 2024, was one of only 13 U.S. cities to have representatives of all four major professional sports leagues, although only one of these teams actually carry the city name and play within the city limits. Phoenix was the last of the metropolitan areas with teams in all four leagues to gain its first major professional sports team, when the Suns were granted a franchise in 1968.

Other team sports in the Phoenix area include indoor football, soccer, as well as being the only city in the country to host an entire spring-training league for MLB, the Cactus League. Other major sporting teams/events in the Phoenix metropolitan area include PGA and LPGA golf, NASCAR and NHRA racing, and major marathons.

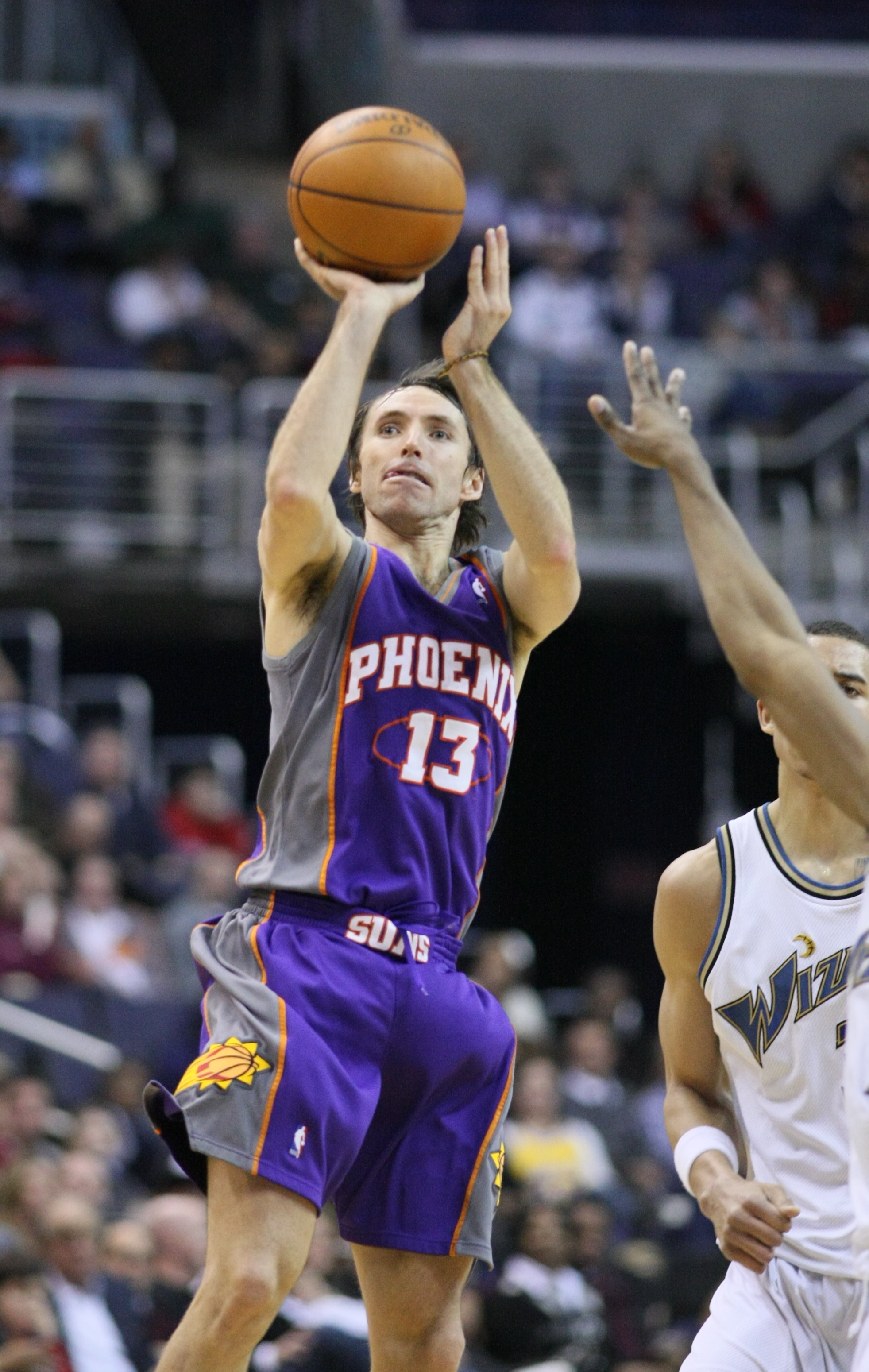
Steve Nash played for the Phoenix Suns.

== Tables of Phoenix area sports teams ==
=== Major professional league teams ===
Club	Sport	League	Venue	Established	Titles
Arizona Diamondbacks	Baseball	Major League Baseball	Chase Field	1998	1 (2001)
Phoenix Suns	Basketball	National Basketball Association	Mortgage Matchup Center	1968	0
Arizona Cardinals	American football	National Football League	State Farm Stadium	1898*	0

(*)Note: The Cardinals moved to Phoenix in 1988, and both championships were won prior to that move.

=== Other notable teams ===
Club	Sport	League	Venue	Titles
Phoenix Mercury	Women's basketball	Women's National Basketball Association	Mortgage Matchup Center	3 (2007, 2009, 2014)
Arizona Rattlers	Indoor football	Indoor Football League	Desert Diamond Arena	8 (1994, 1997, 2012, 2013, 2014, 2017, 2024, 2026)
Phoenix Rising FC	Soccer	USL Championship	Phoenix Rising Soccer Stadium	1 (2023)
Valley Suns	Basketball	NBA G League	Mullett Arena	0

== Baseball ==
Phoenix hosts the Arizona Diamondbacks during the regular season, and hosts the 15 major league teams of the Cactus League during spring training. Phoenix's Ahwatukee American Little League reached the 2006 Little League World Series as the representative from the U.S. West region.

=== Arizona Diamondbacks ===
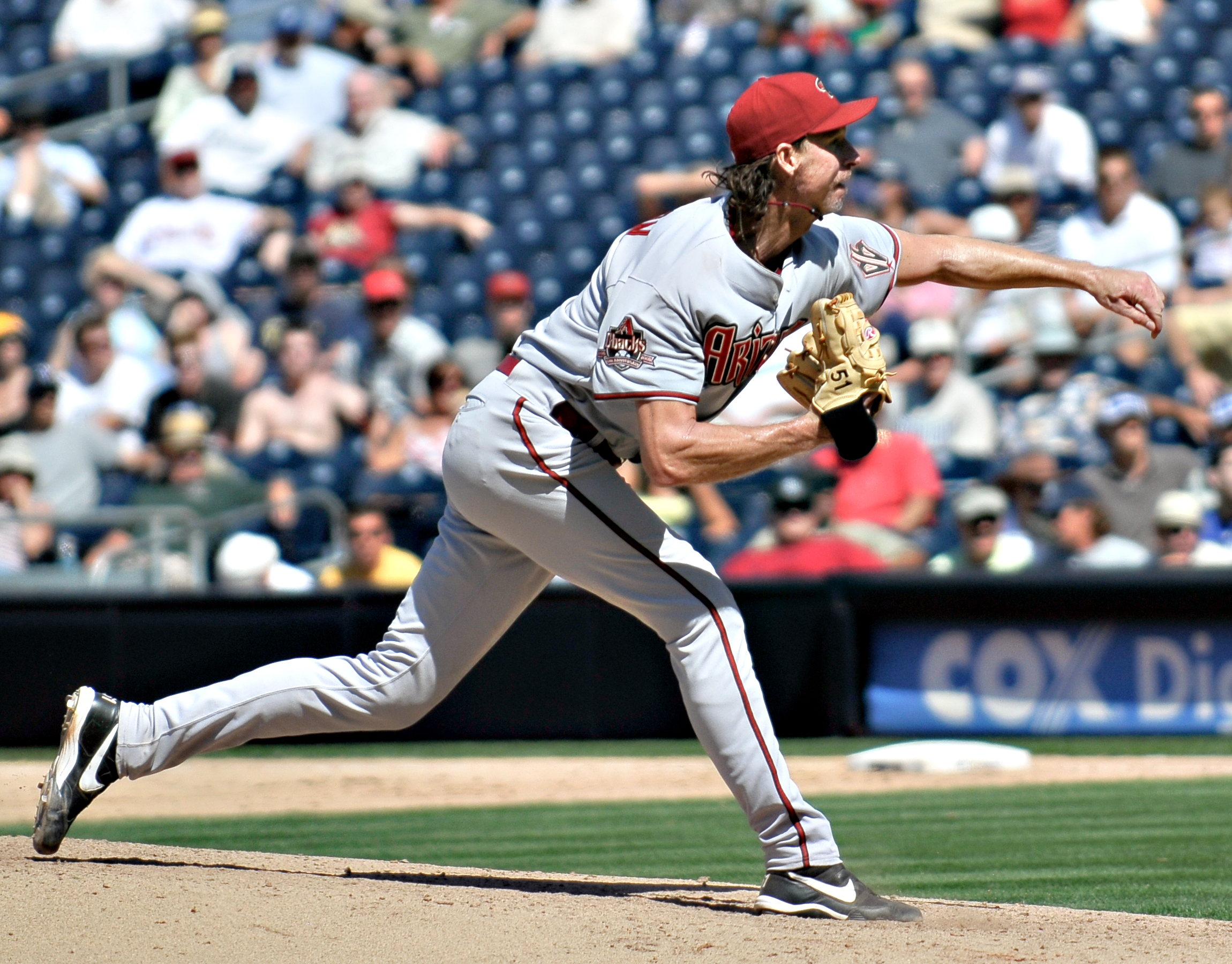
Randy Johnson pitching for the Arizona Diamondbacks

The Arizona Diamondbacks of Major League Baseball (National League West Division) began play as an expansion team in 1998. With their arrival in the valley, Phoenix became just the 10th city in the nation to host a major league team in all four major sports. The team has played all of its home games in the same downtown park; originally called Bank One Ballpark (or "BOB" for short), in 2005 the stadium's name was changed to Chase Field. It is the second highest stadium in the U.S. (after Coors Field in Denver), and is famous for its nationally known swimming pool beyond the outfield fence. In 2001, the Diamondbacks defeated the New York Yankees 4 games to 3 in the World Series, becoming the city's first professional sports franchise to win a national championship while located in Arizona. The win was also the fastest an expansion team had ever won the World Series, surpassing the old mark of the Florida Marlins of 5 years, set in 1997.

=== Cactus League spring training ===
Long before the city was granted the Diamondbacks franchise, there existed a rich baseball tradition in the valley. MLB had taken advantage of the beautiful weather in southern Arizona since 1929, when the Detroit Tigers became the first team to hold their spring training in Arizona, in Riverside Park at Central Avenue and the Salt River. When Bill Veeck moved the Cleveland Indians spring training to Tucson in 1946, and convinced Horace Stoneham, the owner of the New York Giants, to move his spring training to Phoenix. And so the Cactus League was born. Today, the Greater Phoenix area is home to the Cactus League, one of two spring training leagues for Major League Baseball. With the move by the Colorado Rockies and the Arizona Diamondbacks to their new facility in Scottsdale, the league is entirely based in the Greater Phoenix area, as opposed to the Grapefruit League, which is spread throughout southern Florida. With the Cincinnati Reds' move to Goodyear, fifteen of MLB's thirty teams are now included in the Cactus League.

=== Minor leagues ===
Phoenix hosts 19 minor league teams. During the regular season, Phoenix is home to the 13 teams of the Arizona League, which consists of rookie level teams. In the fall, all 30 major league teams send prospects to the six teams of the Arizona Fall League.

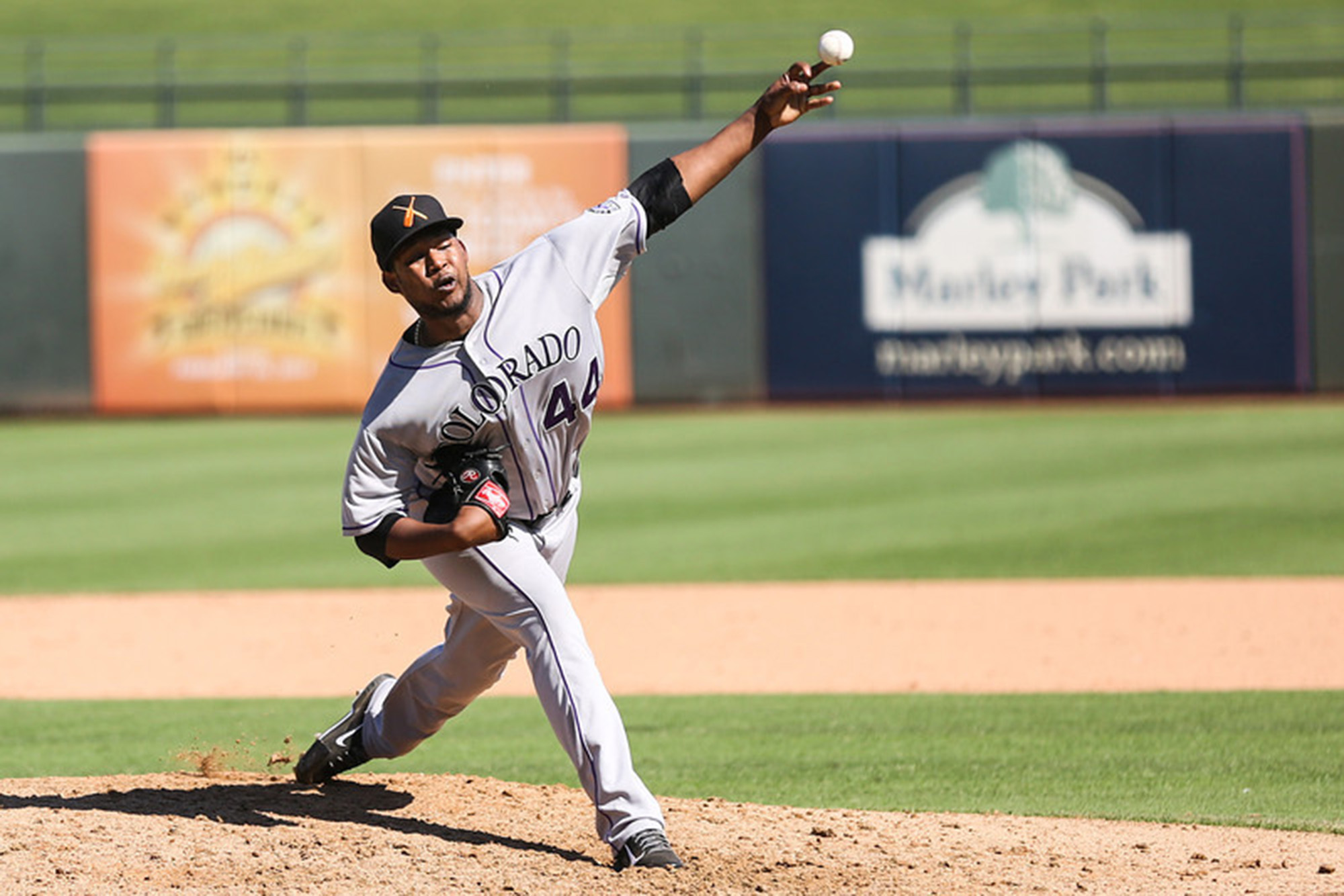
Jayson Aquino pitching for the Salt River Rafters of the Arizona Fall League. (Photo by Arianna Grainey)

The Phoenix metropolitan area is home to an entire minor league, the Arizona League, a rookie level organization. The league has minor league affiliates of thirteen teams, almost mirroring the major league teams which play in the Cactus League. The only two Cactus League teams which do not have a rookie league team playing in Phoenix are the Kansas City Royals and the Colorado Rockies.

The Arizona Fall League is an off-season league run by Major League Baseball, and consists of six teams made up of some of the most talented minor league players in baseball. Unlike baseball's minor leagues, like AAA teams, the teams are not affiliated with a single major-league team. Each of the six teams is affiliated with five major league teams, all of which send seven players to the fall league. Most of the players come from AAA and AA teams. Many famous major-leaguers have played in the league throughout the years; perhaps the most notable was Michael Jordan in 1994, during his attempt to play major-league baseball.

== Basketball ==
=== NBA ===
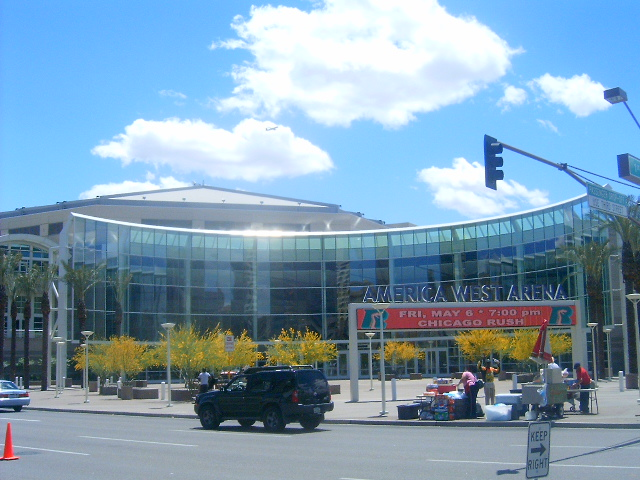
Talking Stick Resort Arena in downtown Phoenix

The Phoenix Suns were the first major sports team in Phoenix, being granted a National Basketball Association (NBA) franchise in 1968. Jerry Colangelo was their first general manager, the youngest in professional sports up to that time, and their name was chosen through a contest through the Arizona Republic. The team initially played their home games at the Arizona Veterans Memorial Coliseum in downtown Phoenix. Their last place finish in their inaugural season made them eligible for a coin toss with the Milwaukee Bucks to see who would get the first pick in the draft, which was to be Lew Alcindor (who later changed his name to Kareem Abdul-Jabbar). The Suns lost the flip, and the two teams went in different directions for the next 8 years. The Suns would not make their first appearance in the NBA finals until 1976, losing to the Boston Celtics in six games.

In 1992, the Suns would move into the newly constructed America West Arena, which had been designed specifically for basketball. The year following their move to the new arena, the Suns made the NBA finals for the second time in franchise history, losing to Michael Jordan's Chicago Bulls, 4 games to 2. As of 2014, the Suns have the highest winning percentage of any team in the NBA without an NBA championship. Since their first appearance in the NBA finals in 1976, the Suns were a perennial playoff team, missing the playoffs only seven times between 1976 and 2010. In more recent years, the team has failed to perform up to playoff level, missing the playoffs from 2011 to 2014. The Suns went on to win the Conference Championship in 2021 for the first time in 28 years. The arena hosted both the 1995 and the 2009 NBA All-Star Games.

The Suns have seen six of their number inducted into the Basketball Hall of Fame: Charles Barkley, Jerry Colangelo, Gail Goodrich, Connie Hawkins, Dennis Johnson, and Gus Johnson. Other notable players to wear the Suns uniform include: Alvan Adams, Danny Ainge, Vince Carter, Tom Chambers, Walter Davis, Grant Hill, Jeff Hornacek, Kevin Johnson, Jason Kidd, Maurice Lucas, Dan Majerle, Stephon Marbury, Shawn Marion, Larry Nance, Steve Nash, Shaquille O'Neal, Truck Robinson, Charlie Scott, Paul Silas, Amar'e Stoudemire, Dick Van Arsdale, and Paul Westphal.

=== WNBA ===
In 1997, the Phoenix Mercury were one of the original eight teams to launch the Women's National Basketball Association (WNBA). Like the Suns, they also play at . Their initial coach was the noted former women's player, Cheryl Miller, who led them to the playoffs in three of their first four years, including their first trip to the WNBA finals in 1998. They have been to the WNBA championship series four times, losing in 1998 to the Houston Comets, before winning their first WNBA championship in 2007, when they defeated the Detroit Shock in five games. They would win another championship in 2009 (after missing the playoffs in 2008), when they defeated the Indiana Fever. 2014 would see the Mercury win their third championship, sweeping the Chicago Sky in three games. Only the Houston Comets, in the first four years of the league, have won more championships (although the Detroit Shock have also won three titles). With Houston and Detroit, they are the only WNBA teams to appear in four championship finals. Six Mercury (as players or coaches) have been inducted into the Women's Basketball Hall of Fame: Ann Meyers-Drysdale, Jennifer Gillom, Nancy Lieberman, Cheryl Miller, Linda Sharp, and Michelle Timms.

== Football ==
=== NFL ===
The Arizona Cardinals are the oldest continuously run professional football franchise in the nation. They moved to Phoenix from St. Louis, Missouri in 1988 and currently play in the Western Division of the National Football League's National Football Conference. The Cardinals were founded in 1898 in Chicago, as the Morgan Athletic Club, and became known as the Cardinals shortly after, due to the color of their jerseys. Around the turn of the last century, they were known as the Racine Cardinals, and in 1920, they became a charter member of the American Professional Football League, which would eventually become the National Football League. Upon their move to Phoenix, the Cardinals originally played their home games at Sun Devil Stadium on the campus of Arizona State University in nearby Tempe. In 2006 they moved to the newly constructed then-named University of Phoenix Stadium in suburban Glendale. Since moving to Phoenix, the Cardinals have made one championship appearance, Super Bowl XLIII on February 1, 2009, where they lost 27–23 to the Pittsburgh Steelers.

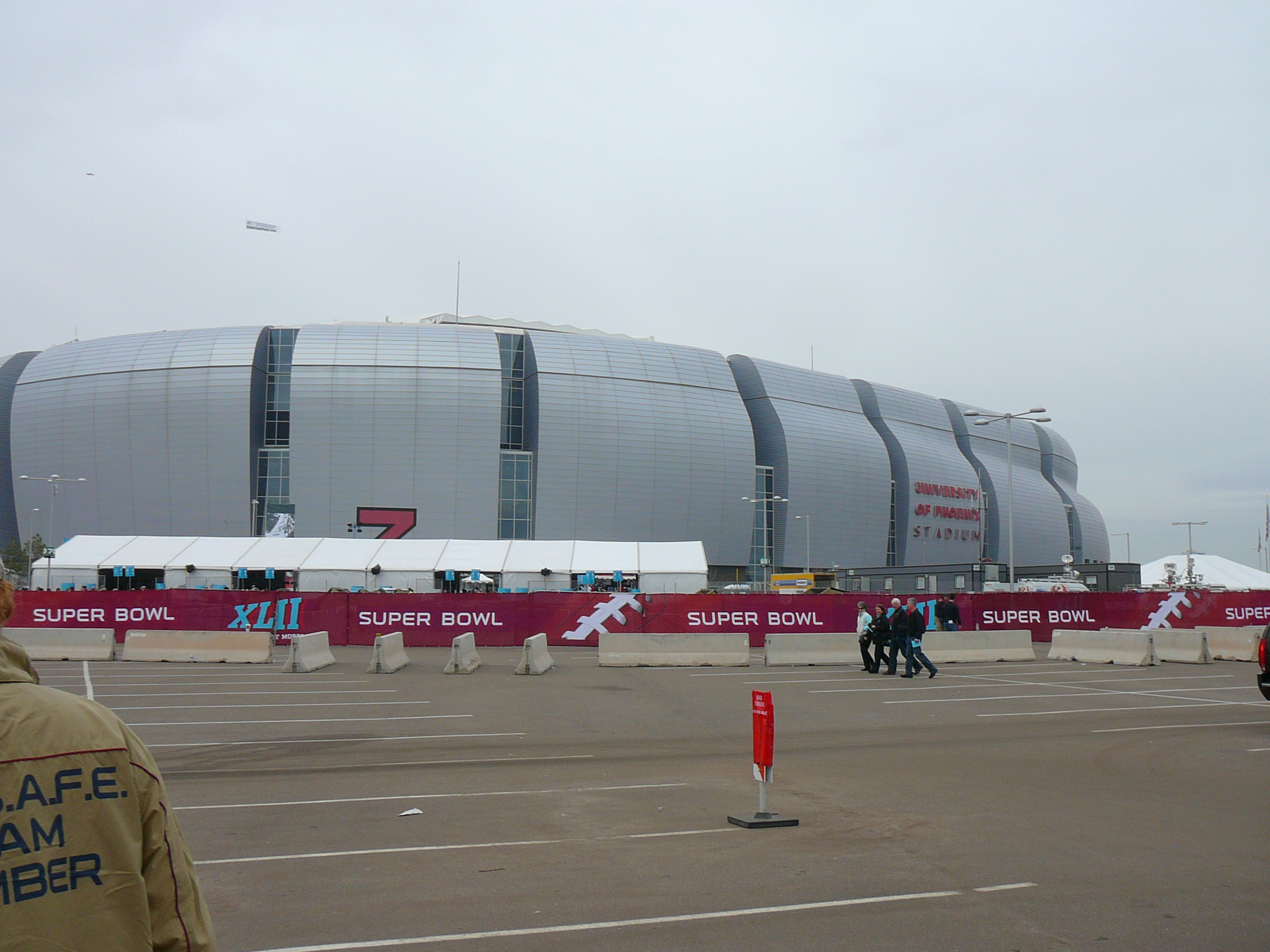
State Farm Stadium on the game day of Super Bowl XLII

Sun Devil Stadium held Super Bowl XXX in 1996 when the Dallas Cowboys defeated the Pittsburgh Steelers. University of Phoenix Stadium hosted Super Bowl XLII on February 3, 2008, in which the New York Giants defeated the New England Patriots. State Farm Stadium hosted Super Bowl XLIX in 2015, where the New England Patriots defeated the Seattle Seahawks. State Farm Stadium hosted Super Bowl LVII in 2023 where the Kansas City Chiefs defeated the Philadelphia Eagles.

=== Indoor football ===
Phoenix has an indoor football team, the Arizona Rattlers of the Indoor Football League (IFL), which began operations in 1992. The team originally played in the Arena Football League (AFL) from 1992 to 2016. Games are played at Desert Diamond Arena in Glendale. They won their first of five AFL championships in 1994; in 2014 they won their third championship in a row. Their nine appearances in the Arena Bowls are more than any other team; and their 40-point win over the Cleveland Gladiators (72–32) in Arena Bowl XXVII was the most lopsided in the history of the AFL. With their last Arena Bowl victory in 2014, the Rattlers joined the Tampa Bay Storm as the only teams to win five AFL championships.

=== AAF ===
In 2018, the Alliance of American Football announced the city would be home to the Arizona Hotshots, set to play in 2019 at Sun Devil Stadium.

== Ice hockey ==
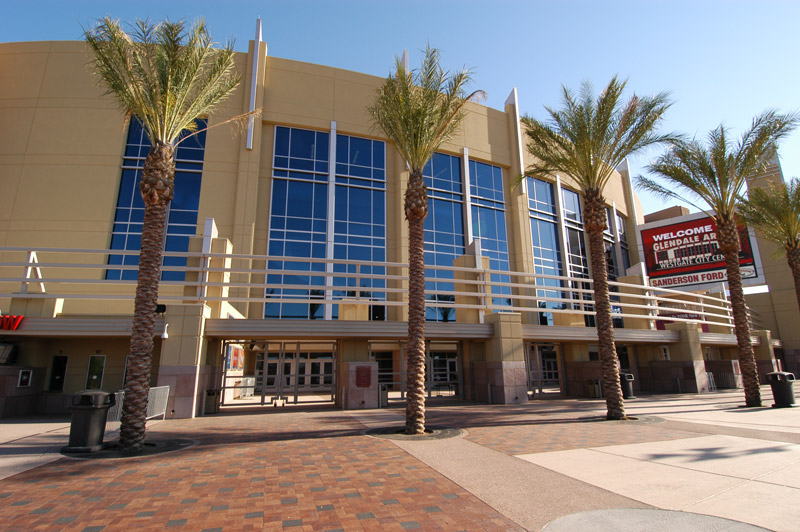
Gila River Arena in Glendale

The Arizona Coyotes of the National Hockey League moved to the area in 1996, when they were formerly known as the Winnipeg Jets. They originally played their home games downtown at America West Arena (now ) before moving in December 2003 to the Jobing.com Arena (now the Gila River Arena), adjacent to University of Phoenix Stadium in Glendale. Despite ongoing financial difficulties, and continual discussion of moving the team to a different city, an agreement was reached to sell the team to IceArizona Acquisition Co., LLC. on August 5, 2013, assuring that the team would remain in Phoenix area for the near future. Starting in 2022, the team played its home games at the 5,000 seat Mullett Arena while they attempted to build a new arena in the area. After the conclusion of the 2023–24 NHL season, the team's assets would be relocated to Salt Lake City to become the Utah Mammoth after ownership failed to secure an arena in the Phoenix area. Originally, the plan was for the franchise to remain dormant so that they would be reactivated should they successfully build a new arena by 2029, but on June 21, 2024, the Arizona State Land Department cancelled an auction for a 110 acres (45 ha) parcel of land owner Alex Meruelo intended to purchase as a site for a new arena. Three days later, Merulo left the franchise altogether, effectively ceasing operations. Currently, Suns owner Mat Ishbia has shown interest in reviving an NHL team in the Phoenix area.

Originally known as the Phoenix Coyotes upon their arrival, they changed their name to the Arizona Coyotes in 2014. The team has advanced beyond the first round of the Stanley Cup Playoffs just once, reaching the third round of the 2012 Stanley Cup playoffs, where they lost to the Los Angeles Kings 4 games to 1. They also won the best of 5 qualifying round 3 games to 1 against the Nashville Predators in the 2020 Stanley Cup Playoffs but would go on to lose 4 games to 1 to the Colorado Avalanche in the official first round.

== Other professional sports ==
=== Motor sports ===
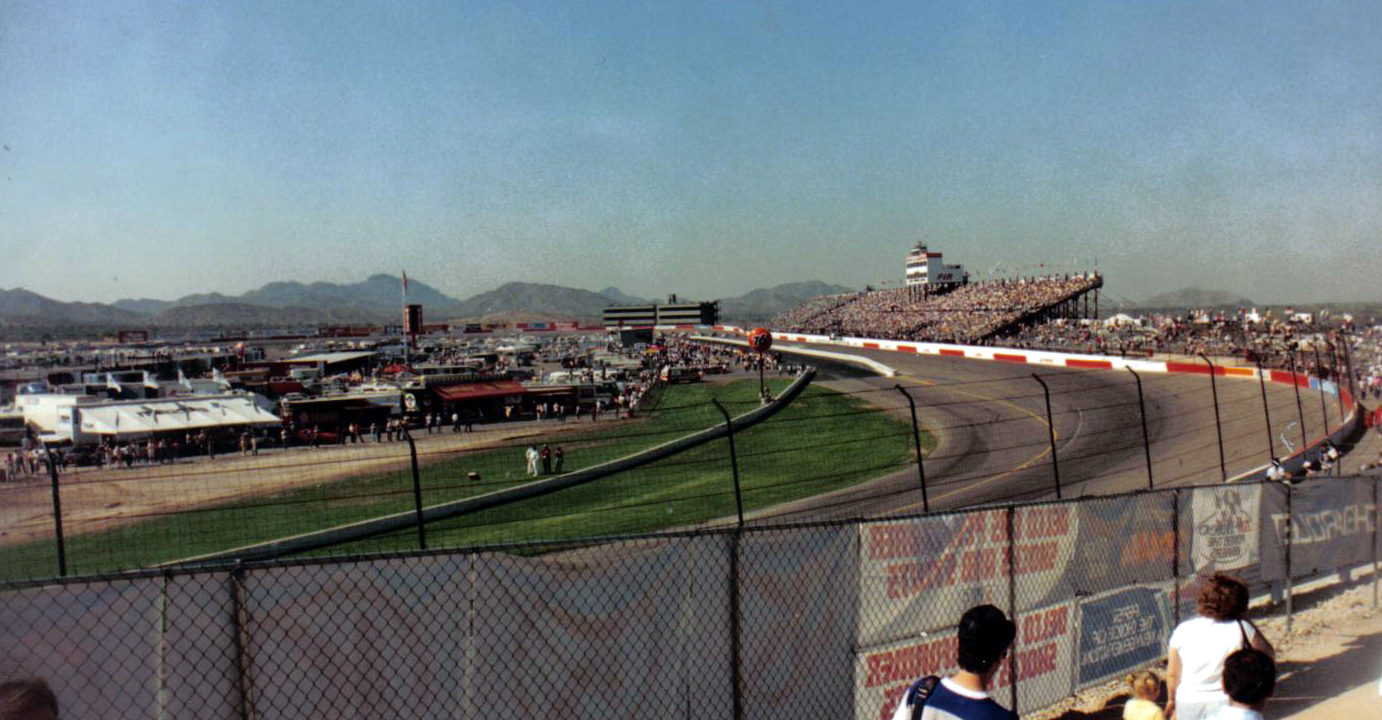
Phoenix Raceway

The Phoenix Raceway, was built in 1964 with a one-mile oval, a one-of-a-kind design, as well as a 2.5-mile road course. Today, "Phoenix International Raceway has a tradition that is unmatched in the world of racing." It currently hosts several NASCAR events per season, and the annual Fall NASCAR weekend, which includes events from four different NASCAR classes, is a huge event. After thirty years of hosting various events, especially NHRA drag racing events, Firebird International Raceway (FIR) closed operations in 2013. However, the NHRA negotiated a deal with the Gila River Indian Community (the owners of FIR) and re-opened the venue to NHRA events in 2014, under the new name, "Wild Horse Pass Motorsports Park". Phoenix hosted the United States Grand Prix from 1989 to 1991. The race was discontinued after the 1991 edition due to poor attendance.

=== Golf ===
The city is also host to several major professional golf events, including the LPGA's Founder's Cup. Since 1932, the city has hosted one of the oldest golfing tournaments in the United States, The Phoenix Open of the PGA.

=== Soccer ===
In 2012, Phoenix was granted a professional soccer team, the Phoenix FC, who played in the USL Professional Division, which is in the third tier of the United States Soccer Federation. When the team fell into financial difficulties, they lost their franchise in 2014. They were replaced the following day by Arizona United SC (now Phoenix Rising FC), who play their home games at Phoenix Rising Soccer Stadium.

=== Sporting Events ===
The Phoenix Marathon is a new addition to the city's sports scene, having offered a half-marathon and 10k race in 2012, with the full marathon beginning in 2013, and is a qualifier for the Boston Marathon. The Rock 'n' Roll Marathon series has held an event in Phoenix every January since 2004.

The Phoenix area is the site of two college football bowl games: the Buffalo Wild Wings Bowl, formerly known as the Insight Bowl, which was at Chase Field until 2005, after which it moved to Sun Devil Stadium; and the Fiesta Bowl, played at the University of Phoenix Stadium.

In April 2026, Phoenix hosted the NCAA Division I women's basketball Final Four for the first time. The national semifinals and championship game were held at Mortgage Matchup Center, with tournament games and associated fan events attracting a combined 360,823 attendees to downtown Phoenix.

Phoenix's Ahwatukee American Little League reached the 2006 Little League World Series as the representative from the U.S. West region.

== College sports ==
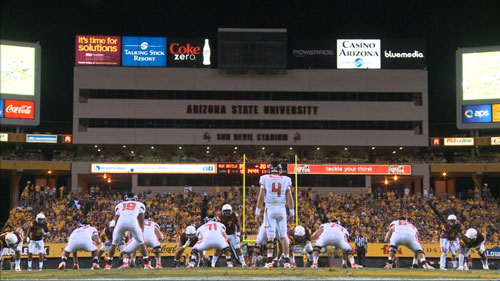
ASU Football Team

Phoenix is home to two NCAA Division I schools: Arizona State University (ASU) and Grand Canyon University (GCU). ASU plays in the Big 12 Conference. They were in the Western Athletic Conference (WAC) until joining, along with the University of Arizona, the Pac-8 conference in 1978, after which time it was known as the Pac-10. The university has won 23 NCAA team championships: women's golf (7), baseball (5), men's golf (2), women's indoor track & field (2), softball (2), and 1 each in men's gymnastics, men's indoor track & field, men's outdoor track & field, wrestling, and women's outdoor track & field. In addition, prior to the NCAA recognizing women's sports for national championships, ASU holds the record for the most national championships sanctioned by the Association for Intercollegiate Athletics for Women (AIAW) with 12, four more than the school with the second most, UCLA.

Grand Canyon University is a member of the WAC. Historically, the school had been a member of the NAIA, before moving to NCAA Division II in the early 1990s. For the 2013–14 year, the school moved up to Division I, when it joined the WAC. The school has won several NAIA national championships: baseball (4), men's basketball (3), and women's tennis (1). In addition, they have won two NCAA Division II national championships in soccer and men's indoor track & field.
