= Carlos Peña González =

Chilean lawyer and university professor (born 1959)

Carlos Peña
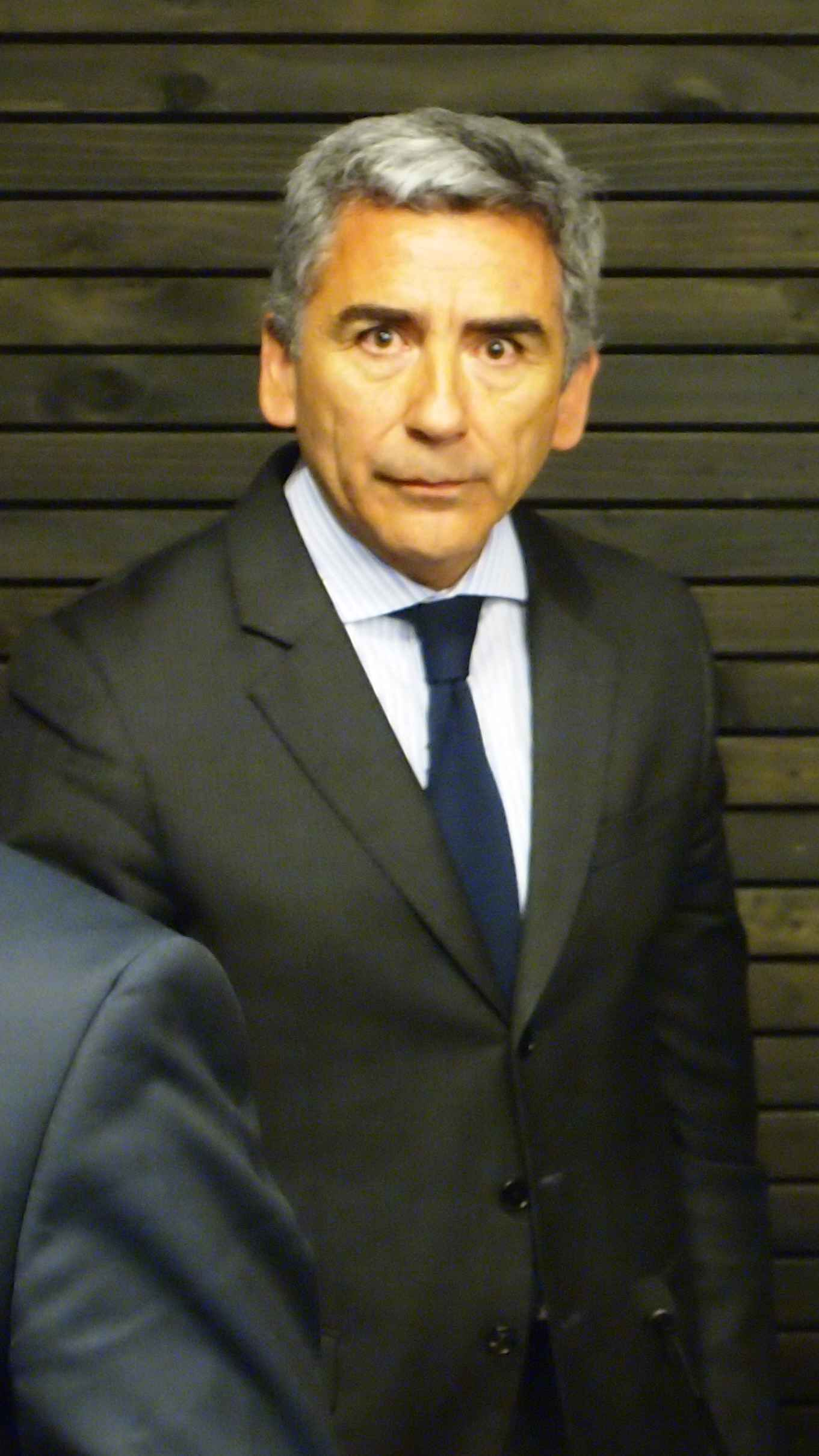
- Carlos Peña

Personal details
- Born: 8 June 1959 (age 67) Santiago, Chile
- Education: Pontifical Catholic University of Chile (LL.B, 1987) (MA in Sociology, 1986−1988); University of Chile (Ph.D. in Laws, 2011)
- Profession: Lawyer; Sociologist

Carlos Hernán Peña González (Chile, June 8, 1959) is a lawyer and university professor who is since 2005 rector of the Diego Portales University and Sunday columnist of El Mercurio. Peña is also vicepresident of CIPER Chile; member of the directory of Fundación Nicanor Parra; Counsellor of Teatro Municipal de Santiago; member of the directory of Museo de la Memoria y los Derechos Humanos and member of the Comisión de Verdad Histórica y Nuevo Trato con los Pueblos Indígenas (2001-2003). He was also a government advisor in the Reforma Procesal Penal (1994-2000) and family law (1989-1994).
