= Omaha Marathon =

Annual marathon taking place in Omaha, Nebraska, United States, since 1975

- Date: September
- Location: Omaha, Nebraska
- Event type: Road
- Distance: Marathon
- Established: 1975
- Website: www.omahamarathon.com

The Omaha Marathon is an annual marathon held in Omaha, Nebraska, United States. The event began in 1975 and had its 35th edition in 2010. The event is a qualification event for the Boston Marathon. Today, the event also includes a half-marathon and 5K. The 2010 race was held on September 26 and there were 608 finishers.

On May 1, 2013, it was announced that the previously all-volunteer, non-profit race would be taken over by HITS, Inc. and made part of the HITS Running Festivals. The Omaha Running Club is now the official organizer.

== Course ==
The route has 17 miles of flat terrain and the running surface is mostly concrete or asphalt. Part of the route passes by Carter Lake and the Missouri River.
