= OC Marathon =

Annual running event in Califormia, US

- Location: Orange County, California, United States
- Event type: Road
- Established: 2004 (22 years ago)
- Course records: 2:14:06
- Website: ocmarathon.com

The Hoag OC Marathon Running Festival is an annual running event held in Orange County, California. The event showcases three days of activities including a 5K run held at sunset on Saturday, and the half marathon and full marathon on Sunday.

== History ==
Prior to the organization of the OC Marathon in its current incarnation, several marathon events had been held in Orange County but failed to become regular events. The Goodyear Orange County Marathon was held in 1992, with BMW cars awarded to the men's and women's winners, but the event was beset with organizational shortfalls and unpaid bills.

One of the founders of the current incarnation of the OC Marathon is Scott Baugh, the chairman of the local Republican Party. The inaugural OC Marathon was held on December 5, 2004, with an estimated 10,000 runners participating, and the winners of the men's and women's marathon races receiving $1,500 each.

The event was cancelled in 2020 due to the COVID-19 pandemic. It returned in November 2021, but with only the 5K and half marathon distances, and without the full marathon. The full marathon returned to the event in May 2022.

In 2024, a 24 year-old was disqualified as the men's winner of the marathon for taking water from a family member on a bicycle.

== Course ==
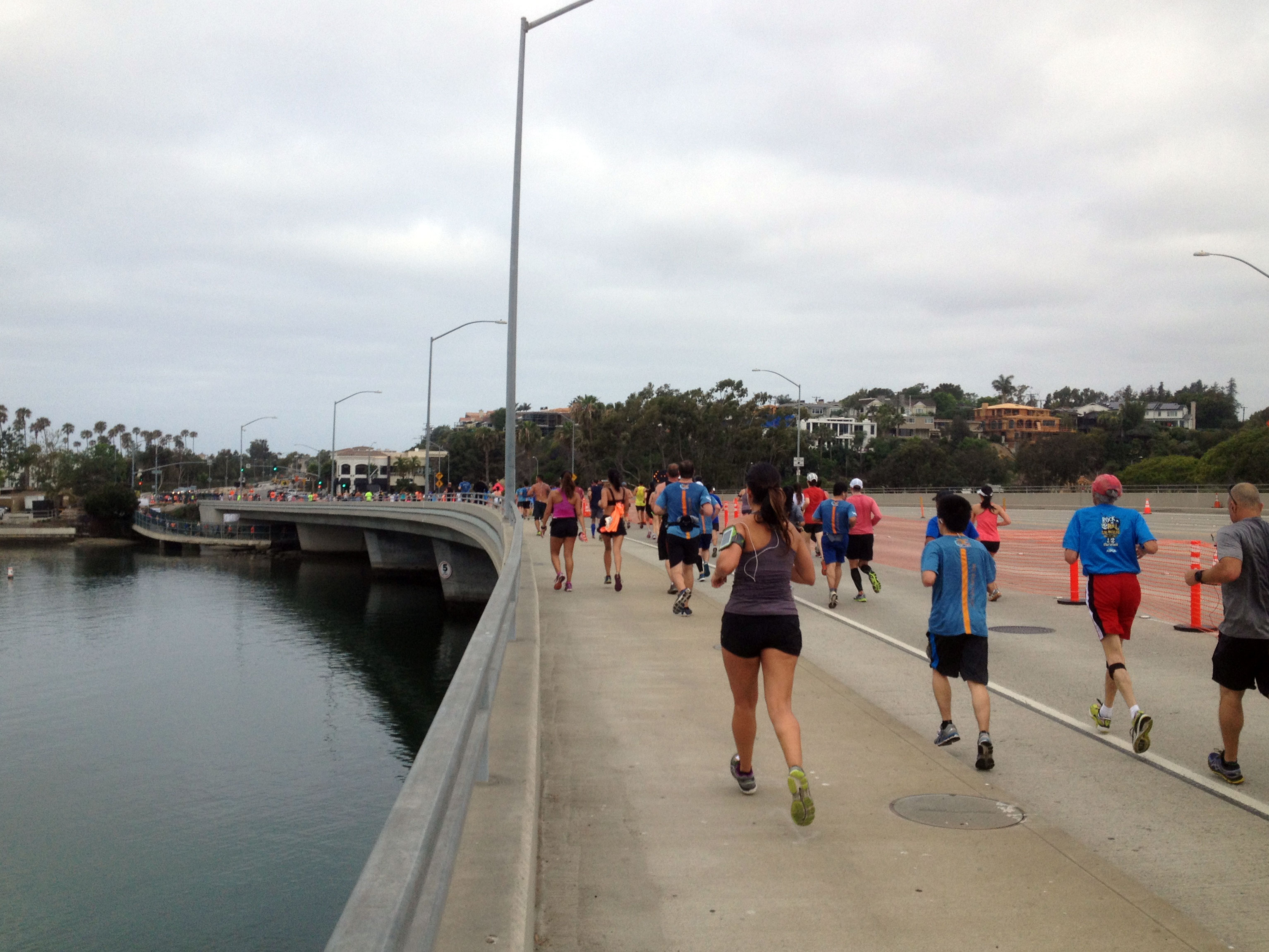
Runners on Pacific Coast Highway in Newport Beach during the 2015 OC Marathon.

The marathon and half marathon course starts at Fashion Island, an outdoor shopping mall in Newport Beach. It heads down a section of Pacific Coast Highway into Corona del Mar neighborhood, with views of the Pacific Ocean. The course passes along Newport Bay, then inland through residential streets along Upper Newport Bay. The half marathon course turns left after the 12-mile mark to head toward its end at the OC Fair & Event Center.

The full marathon course continues inland into the city of Costa Mesa, passing by the Orange County Museum of Art, Segerstrom Center for the Arts, and South Coast Plaza around mile 16-17. It goes into the city of Santa Ana before heading back south on the Santa Ana River Trail, back into Costa Mesa and ending at the OC Fairgrounds.

The 5K course starts and ends at the OC Fair & Event Center, with the route passing through neighboring Orange Coast College.

== See also ==
- Los Angeles Marathon
