= Christopher Kipyego =

Kenyan marathon runner

Christopher Kipyego (born 13 June 1974) is a runner from Kenya who has won multiple major marathon races, including the Mexico City Marathon (spanish: Maratón Internacional de la Ciudad de México) in 2006 with a time of 2:17:23.

== Early career ==
Christopher Kipyego emerged as a competitive runner in 2003 when he scored 3rd place in the First KAAA Cross Country 4K in Nairobi, Kenya finishing in 10:42, just behind Raymond Yator and World Championship cross country competitor Samson Ngetich. Shortly after, Kipyego participated in the highly competitive Atlas Guadalajara Half Marathon in Guadalajara, Mexico where he finished 5th in 1:04:34.

Kipyego settled in Mexico and in 2004, competed in the Mexican National Championship 5K in Mazatlán, where he finished third in 14:15 behind Alejandro Suarez and Rafael Sanchez. Suarez would go on to win the North American 5K Championships. The following day, Kipyego ran the second-fastest half marathon he would ever run: 1:03:55 for second place in the Gran Pacifico Mazatlán Half Marathon, where he was just behind Isaac Kimaiyo. The day also saw the fastest ever woman's marathon in Latin America when Dorota Gruca finished the full marathon in 2:28:49.

Kipyego placed in the top 10 at several other half marathons through 2006, including a repeat 5th at the Guadalajara Half. He won the Tlaquepaque Half Marathon (Spanish: Medio Maratón de Tlaquepaque) in Tlaquepaque, Mexico. The race featured Kenyan competition with Momanyi Evans and Philip Kemei, and several course snafus. The media vehicles were allowed on the course, and they crowded the three runners, cutting them off in the narrow streets. Then, toward the end of the race, the leaders were directed the wrong way. They had to double back and lost about a minute in the rerouting. All three runners finished within four seconds of each other. Kipyego was in the front with a time of 1:05:06.

== Professional career ==
On Aug. 27, Kipyego emerged on the world stage at the Mexico City Marathon, an IAAF Gold-labelled event. At the halfway point, he was running in a lead pack with 2003 winner George Okworo and Mexican Alejandro Cuahtepizi. They raced passed the Angel of Independence and other landmarks while the leaders were striding through the heat. They raced past political protesters who had been occupying the Plaza del Zócalo in support of Andrés Manuel López Obrador, garnering cheers of "Mexico! Mexico!" The protest did not obstruct the race, and Kipyego pulled away from the pack to finish ten seconds ahead of Okworo for first prize and 270,000 pesos (or $22,800 USD).

Four months later, he went on to beat that time and win his second marathon in a row at the Powerade Monterrey Marathon in Monterrey, Mexico. He ran the first half in 1:08:40 and negative split the second half (1:06:03) for a personal record by more than three minutes, scoring a 2:14:43.

In March 2007, Kipyego traveled to the United States for the 22nd Los Angeles Marathon. On a new point-to-point course lined with an estimated 1 million spectators, Kipyego trailed Kenyans Fred Mogaka and Moses Kororia and finished third in 2:18:21.

He returned for the Mexico City Marathon, placing tenth, before traveling to the Istanbul Marathon in Turkey, where he finished 32nd. At the end of the year, he attempted to defend his title at the Monterrey Marathon, where he finished third in 2:15:48.

In 2008 and 2009, Kipyego finished in the top 10 at several Mexican marathons and half marathons. In both years, he won the Tangamanga International Marathon (spanish Maratón Internacional Tangamanga, Mexico) in San Luis Potosí, Mexico. He took 1st at the Puebla Volkswagen Marathon in Puebla, Mexico with a time of 2:18:46. And after a disappointing finish in the Netherlands' Eindhoven Marathon, he returned to Mexico to win the Gran Pacifico Mazatlán Marathon in 2:16:12.

In 2010, Kipyego again set a personal record for the marathon distance when he traveled to Scottsdale, Arizona for the P.F. Chang's Rock 'n' Roll Arizona Marathon in January 2010. More than 8,000 runners filled the streets and ran to downtown Tempe, Arizona, led by a group of seven. At the 24-mile mark, Ethiopian Terefe Yae turned over a quick mile, with Kipyego in pursuit. Yae pushed to a win, with Kipyego second in 2:12:56, 15-seconds behind. He won second place at Panama City International Marathon, the Santiago Marathon in Chile and a marathon in Juarez, Mexico. And he was in the United States again in the summer, where he raced his first Grandma's Marathon from Two Harbors, Minnesota to Duluth. He came in second in 2:16:00 to win more than $8,000. He finished the year with a win at the 45th Gobernador Marathon in Mexicali, Mexico, in 2:19:23.

Kipyego was not finished in Duluth. He returned in 2011, and made a bold claim that he would win the race. He went on to record his marathon personal record at Grandma's Marathon on June 18, 2011, where he brought home $11,500 with a first-place finish in a time of 2:12:16. The finish was the closest in the history of the race, with both runners clocking the same time—Kipyego won by a nose. He had been leading Teklu Deneke by several seconds, but he mistook a timing mat for the finish line and, for a brief moment, started celebrating. Race officials and spectators were shouting for him to continue. When Deneke pulled up beside him, he realized the mistake and sprinted step-for-step with the Ethiopian, just edging him at the actual finish line.

Throughout the rest of 2011 and 2012, Kipyego placed second or third in more than 10 major Mexican marathons as well as second in the Asunción International Marathon in Paraguay and fourth in the Dalian International Marathon in China. In 2011, he also raced the Twin Cities Marathon from Minneapolis to St. Paul, Minnesota, but dropped out with stomach issues.

In 2012, at the 36th annual Grandma's Marathon, Kipyego returned to defend his 2011 win. With more than 7,500 other runners, Kipyego was considered a favorite against two other sub-2:10 Ethiopian marathoners. But Kipyego didn't make it to the event due to travel issues. He did make it to the Twin Cities Marathon in 2012. There, on a cold morning in October, Kipyego found a large prize by scoring the win in a time of 2:14:53, netting him $15,000. "I love these two races so much," he said of the Minnesota courses.

Kipyego came to California in December 2012 to run the California International Marathon. Chasing Daniel Tapia and Tesfaye Alemayehu through the rainy, cool weather, he sprinted to a third-place finish in 2:17:59.

2013 through 2015 saw Kipyego in the top 10 for more marathons, including 3rd place at the Guadalajara Marathon Oct. 13, finishing with a time of 2:21:42. He came back in 2014 to win 2nd place. In 2015, he finished the race in 3rd. In 2013, he won the Tijuana Half Marathon. In 2014, he was back at Grandma's Marathon, for a third-place finish in 2:11:59.

== Later career ==
In 2017, Kipyego won the Mazatlan Gran Pacifico Half Marathon. In 2018, he won the 39th running of the Guiding León Marathon (Spanish: el Guiar Maratón de León) in 2:22:21. A month later, Kipyego was at the 2018 Detroit Free Press/Chemical Bank Marathon. In 30-degree weather, he clipped out the miles in an average of 5:23 minutes to win in 2:20:59, taking home $6,000.

By 2019, Kipyego, who was now 45, was winning his age group (and masters) in races such as the Guadalajara Half Marathon, where he finished 16th overall in 1:13:11. In June 2019, he won his third consecutive masters' victory at Grandma's Marathon in 2:17:06, a few minutes behind overall winner Boniface Kongin.

He returned to Detroit for the Detroit Free Press/TCF Bank Marathon on a morning with perfect weather. As the course crossed the Detroit River and doubled back downtown Detroit, he broke away from the others and pushed hard at the 20-mile-mark across the MacArthur Bridge to finish first in 2:18:59.

The COVID-19 pandemic swept the globe in 2020, eliminating most chances for competitive runners to face off against each other. With travel restrictions and then race cancelations, Kipyego would not be back to Grandma's Marathon or to defend his Detroit title.

== Personal life ==
When not running competitively, Kipyego trained with fellow Kenyans at their camp in Zacatecas, Mexico. By 2021, after investing his prize money over decades, he was making enough in interest to carry him through the COVID-19 pandemic and the cancelation of most competitive races.

Kipyego grew up in Marakwet, Kenya. He started running competitively when he was 28.

He is not the only runner in his family who competes; his older brother Michael Kipyego and his younger sister Sally Kipyego are also world-renowned runners who compete in marathon races. Michael lives in Elgeyo-Marakwet County of Kenya; the two of them went to St. Patrick's High School, a boys' school in Iten, Kenya, known for strong education and athletic training. Sally is a naturalized US citizen who came in third in the 2020 United States Olympic Trials Marathon. She has named Christopher and Michael as inspirations for her.

== Achievements ==
Year	Competition	Venue	Position	Event	Notes
Representing Kenya
2003	Atlas Guadalajara Half	Guadalajara, Mexico	5th	Half Marathon	1:04:34
2004	Mexican National Championship	Mazatlán, Mexico	3rd	5 km	14:15
2004	Mazatlán Marathon	Mazatlán, Mexico	2nd	Half Marathon	1:03:55
2006	Atlas Guadalajara Half	Guadalajara, Mexico	5th	Half Marathon	1:04:39
2006	Mexico City Marathon	Mexico City, Mexico	1st	Marathon	2:17:23
2006	Powerade Monterrey Marathon	Monterrey, Mexico	1st	Marathon	2:14:43
2007	Los Angeles Marathon	Los Angeles, California	3rd	Marathon	2:18:21
2008	San Luis Potosi Marathon	San Luis Potosi, Mexico	1st	Marathon	2:18:30
2008	Puebla Volkswagen	Puebla, Mexico	1st	Marathon	2:18:46
2010	Gobernador Marathon	Mexicali, Mexico	1st	Marathon	2:19:23
2012	Twin Cities Marathon	Minneapolis-Saint Paul, Minnesota	1st	Marathon	2:14:53
2015	Tijuana International	Tijuana, Mexico	1st	Half Marathon	1:05:15
2017	Gran Pacifico Mazatlán	Mazatlán, Mexico	1st	Half Marathon	1:08:43
2017	Guiding León Marathon	León, Mexico	1st	Marathon	2:22:21
2018	Detroit Free Press Marathon	Detroit, Michigan	1st	Marathon	2:20:59
2019	Detroit Free Press Marathon	Detroit, Michigan	1st	Marathon	2:18:59

*Citations: World Athletics, American Association of Road Racing Statisticians
