= Dulce María Rodríguez =

Mexican long-distance runner

Personal information
- Born: 14 August 1972 (age 53) Toluca, Mexico

Sport
- Sport: Track and field
Medal record
Women's athletics
Representing Mexico
Pan American Games
| Silver medal – second place | 2007 Rio de Janeiro | 10,000 m |
CAC Games
| Gold medal – first place | 2002 San Salvador | 1500 m |
| Gold medal – first place | 2002 San Salvador | 5000 m |
| Silver medal – second place | 2006 Cartagena | 5000 m |

Dulce María Rodríguez de la Cruz (born 14 August 1972) is a Mexican long-distance runner who competes in track and road running events, including the marathon. A three-time Olympian for Mexico (2000, 2004 and 2008), she has also run for Mexico at the World Championships in Athletics on three occasions.

Rodríguez has won medals internationally for Mexico, including two golds and a silver from the Central American and Caribbean Games and a silver from the 2007 Pan American Games. She holds a marathon best of 2:28:54 hours, set at the 2006 Chicago Marathon, and has won domestic marathon races in Mexico City, Torreón and Monterrey.

She has won numerous national titles in long-distance events, including the 10,000 m in 1999, five 1500 m titles from 2000 to 2005, and two Mexican titles in the marathon in 2005 and 2009.

== Career ==
Born in Toluca, she competed at her first high-profile, international competitions in 2000. She ran in the long race at the 2000 IAAF World Cross Country Championships, represented Mexico at the 2000 Summer Olympics over 5000 metres, and competed for the hosts at the 2000 IAAF World Half Marathon Championships in Veracruz, where she was 37th overall. She made her debut over the marathon distance in 2001 and was the runner-up at the Lalá Marathon in Torreón. Rodríguez competed internationally over 5000 m that year at the 2001 World Championships in Athletics.

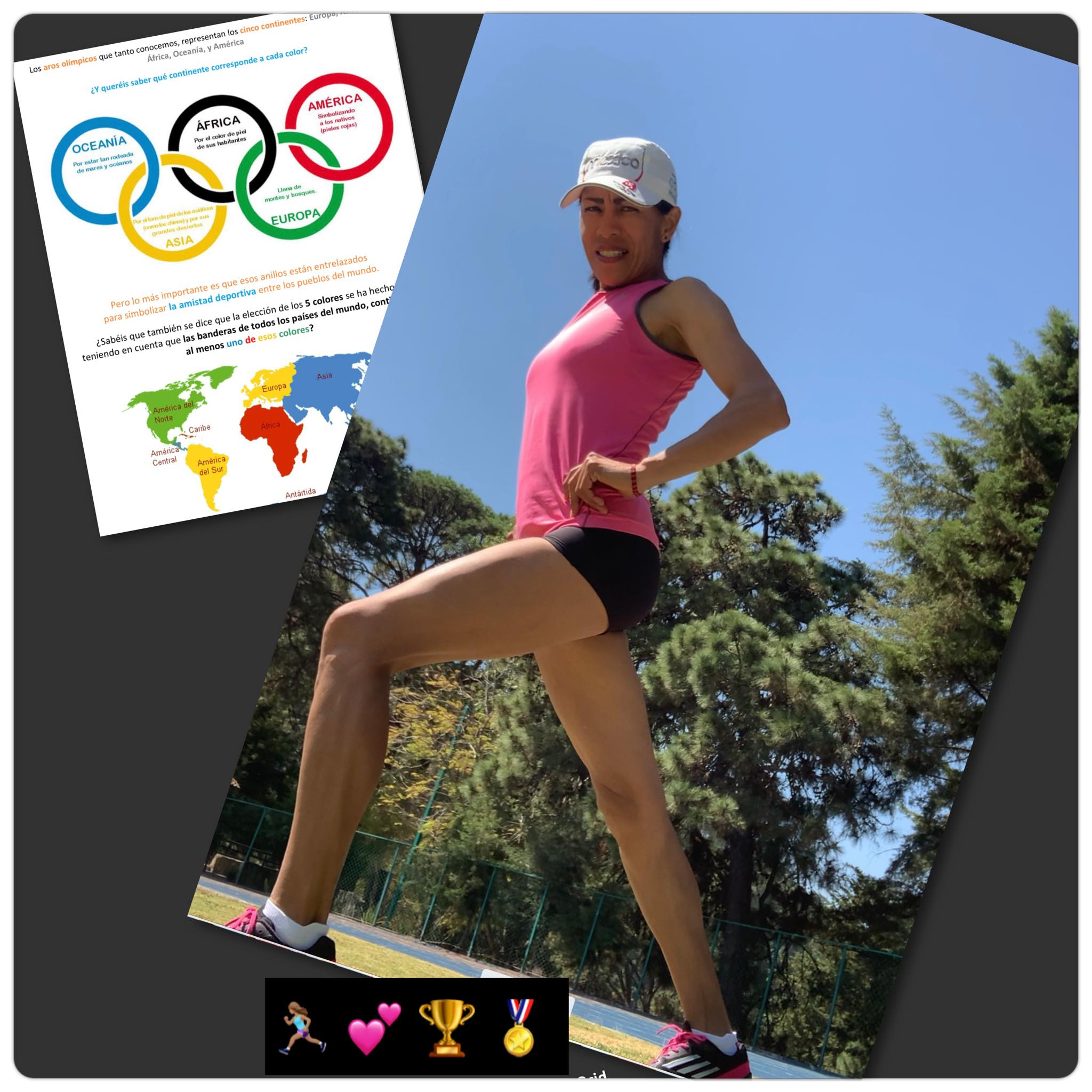
Olympics photo of Dulce Marìa Rodriguez.

She took a regional double at the 2002 CAC Games, taking the gold medals in the 1500 metres and 5000 m. She also won the inaugural North American 5K Championships title that year, helping Mexico to the team title as well. She missed out on a medal at the 2003 Pan American Games, taking fifth in the 1500 m, although she did win the Mexico City Marathon later that year. She established a new best time of 1:11:36 hours for the half marathon at the 2004 Paris Half Marathon with her second-place performance. She made her second Olympic appearance at the 2004 Athens Olympics, taking part in the heats of the 5000 m.

Rodríguez won at the Lala Marathon in April 2005, setting a course record time of 2:29:00 hours – her first run under two and a half hours. She set a personal best in the 10,000 metres the following month, running 31:25.33 minutes in Palo Alto, California. She was selected for both the 5000 m and 10,000 m events at the 2005 World Championships in Athletics, but did not fare well at either distance. She received an elite invitation to the New York City Marathon that year and was 14th in the race. She was second at the Gran Pacifico Mazatlan Half Marathon, completing the distance in a career best time of 1:10:30 hours.

Attempting to defend her 5000 m title, she entered the 2006 CAC Games, but found herself beaten into the silver medal position by Colombia's Bertha Sánchez. On the roads, she was fifth at the Philadelphia Distance Run and came tenth at the Chicago Marathon, setting a new personal record of 2:28:54 hours for the event. The highlight of her 2007 season was a 10,000 m silver medal behind Sara Slattery at the 2007 Pan American Games. She was fourth in the 5000 m at that tournament, as well as placing top three at that year's Stramilano Half Marathon.

Her third consecutive Olympic selection came at the 2008 Summer Olympics in Beijing, where she ran in the final of the 10,000 m. Domestically, she was second at the Lala Marathon and won the Monterrey Marathon. She also secured fourth place at the Berlin Half Marathon. She came second to Margarita Tapia at the 2009 Lala Marathon, but was later upgraded to first as Tapia failed her post-race drugs test. She represented Mexico internationally in the marathon for the first time at the 2009 World Championships in Athletics, but did not manage to finish the race. She ended the year with an appearance at the 2009 IAAF World Half Marathon Championships and registered her highest placing at a world event, coming 21st overall.

== Personal bests ==
- 1500 m: 4:11,46 min (2007)
- 3000 m: 9:02,34 min (2001)
- 5000 m: 15:18,06 min (2004)
- 10,000 m: 31:25,33 min (2005)
- Half marathon: 1:10:30 (2005)
- Marathon: 2:28:54 (2006)

== Achievements ==
| Year | Competition | Venue | Position | Event | Notes |
Representing Mexico
| 2002 | Central American and Caribbean Games | San Salvador, El Salvador | 1st | 1500m | 4:18.91 |
| 2002 | Central American and Caribbean Games | San Salvador, El Salvador | 1st | 5000m | 16:38.92 |
