= Henno Haava =

Estonian athletics competitor

Henno Haava (born 4 February 1973) is an Estonian athletics competitor.

He was born in Tartu. In 1998 he graduated from Berea College in Kentucky and while studying there he competed for the Berea Mountaineers in cross country and track.

He started his sporting exercising in 1985, coached by badminton coach Mart Siliksaar. From 1988 he trained in track and field and was coached by Taivo Mägi. In 1997 he finished 4th in the Detroit Marathon. In 1998 and 1999 he was a repeat champion at the Sunburst Marathon in South Bend, Indiana. He is multiple-times Estonian champion in different running disciplines. He has been a member of Estonian national athletics team.

Personal best:

- 1500 m: 3.53,62 (1993)
- 3000 m: 8.11,0 (1994)
- 5000 m: 14.17,28 (1994)
- 10 000 m: 30.24,15 (1996)
- half marathon: 1:06.03 (1993)
- marathon: 2:18.34 (1999)
