= Mexico City Marathon =

Annual road running event

- Maratón Ciudad de México Telcel logo
- Date: late August or early September
- Location: Mexico City
- Event type: Road
- Distance: Marathon
- Primary sponsor: Telcel
- Established: 1983
- Course records: Men's: 2:08:23 (2023) (Bolivia) Héctor Garibay; Women's: 2:25:05 (2022) (Ethiopia) Amane Beriso Shankule
- Website: Official website
- Participants: 10,051 finishers (2021)

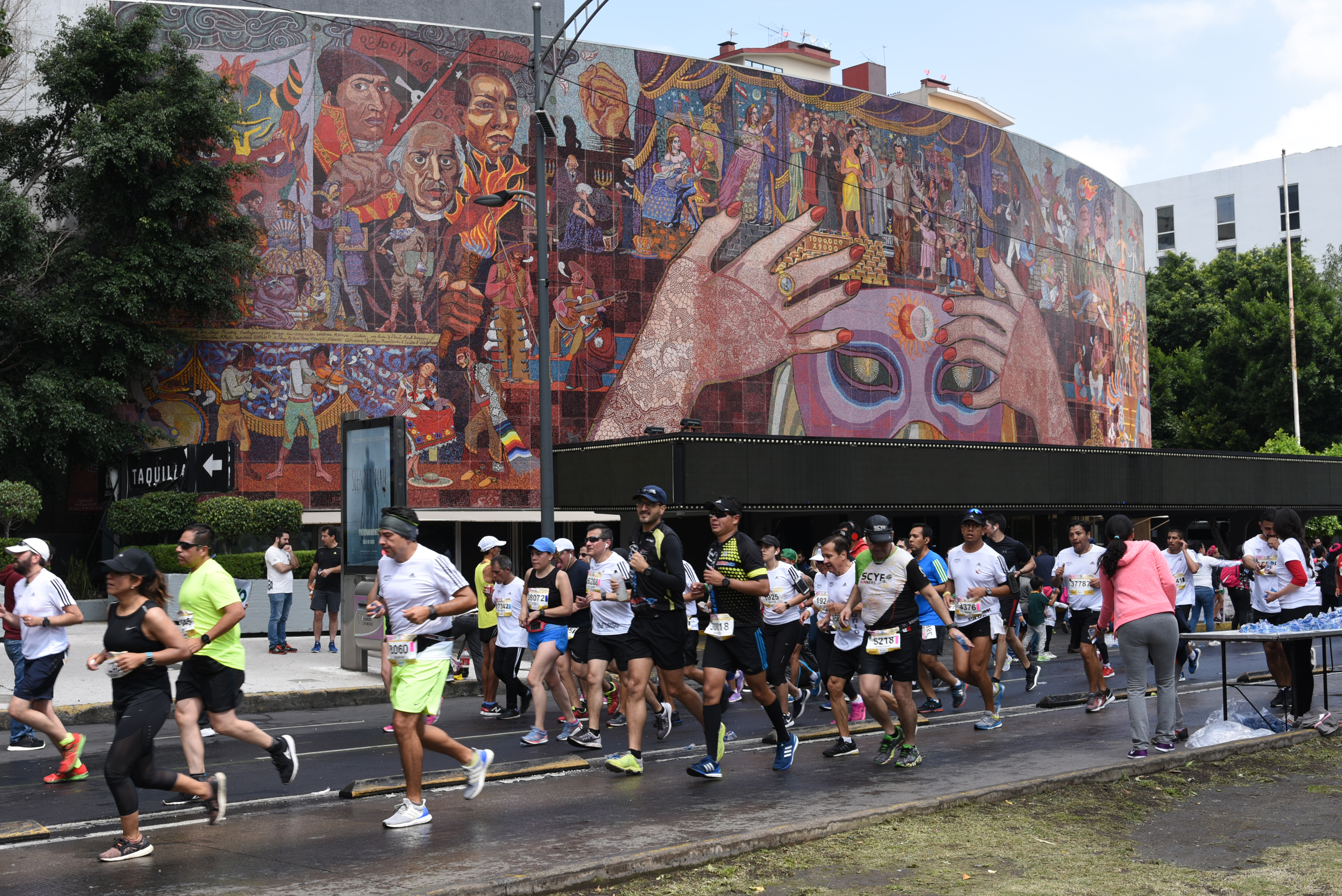
Runners at the 2018 edition of the race.

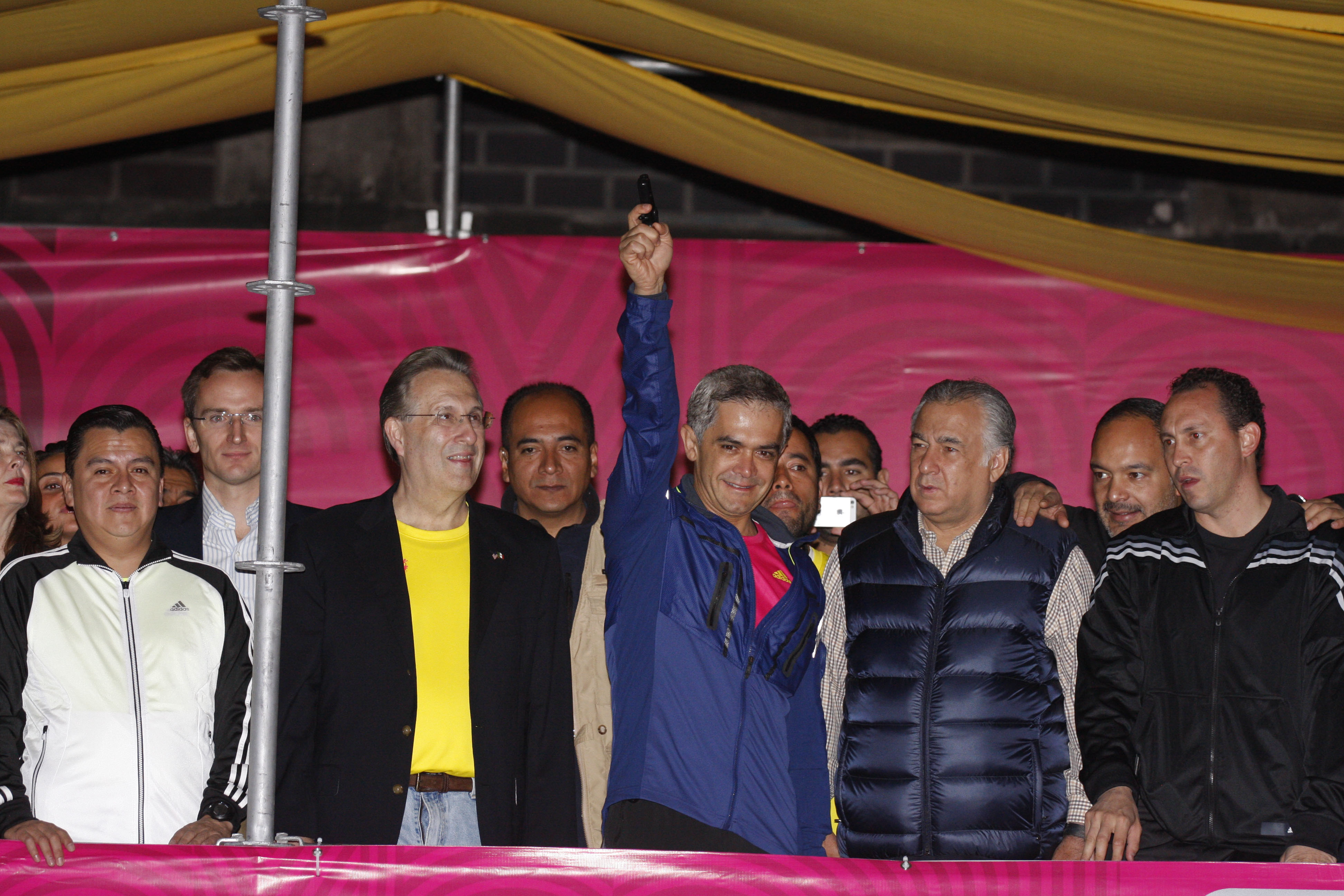
Mexico City Mayor Miguel Ángel Mancera starting the 2013 race.

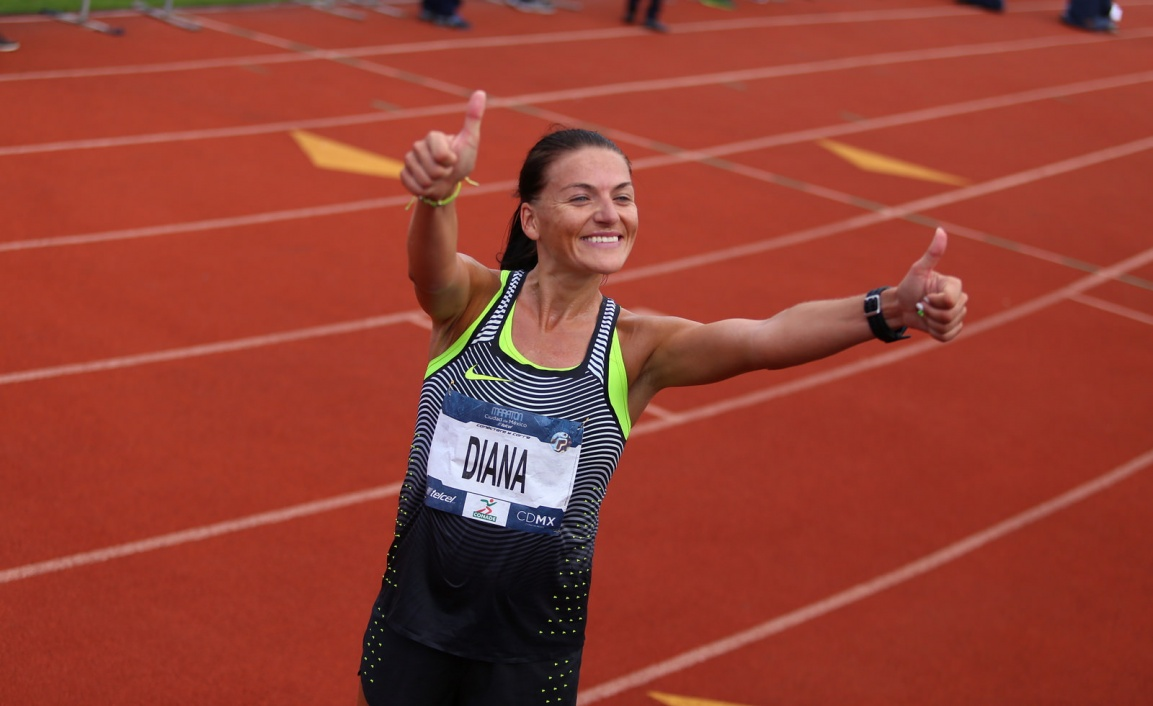
Lithuanian Diana Lobačevskė, the 2016 women's winner.

The Mexico City Marathon (Spanish: Maratón Internacional de la Ciudad de México) is an annual road running event over the marathon distance 42.19 kilometres (26.22 mi) which is held on the streets of Mexico City in late August or early September that in 2018 received IAAF Gold Label Status.

== History ==
The race was established in 1983 at a time of growing interest in marathons in the country – the Independencia Marathon had been launched three years earlier and the Monterrey Marathon had been run over the full distance in 1982. The winner of the first women's race, María del Carmen Cárdenas, later became one of the first female Olympic marathon runners for Mexico. The competition was mostly national in nature until the turn of the 21st century, when more elite international runners began to compete, and win, at the race. Eileen Claugus of the United States was the first foreign winner in 1987, and Ethiopia's Tesfaye Tafa became the first male foreign winner two years later. Since 2002 only one Mexican man has won the race, and no Mexican woman has won since 2010.

The men's course record for the event is held by Bolivian Héctor Garibay won in a record time of 2:08:23 hours in 2023, while the women's course record for the event is held by Ethiopian. Amane Beriso's time of 2:25:04 hours in 2022. The most successful athlete of the competition is María del Carmen Díaz, who took four wins from 1993 to 1997. Course record holder Hillary Kimaiyo Kipchirchir is the most successful man, with three wins to his name. Alene Shewarge Amara and Patricia Jardon also have won the race on three occasions.

The event features several races, besides the elite marathon, including a marathon road bicycle race. The marathon running event itself declares several winners other than the elite race, based on age category and also disability. At the 2015 edition some 35,000 people took part in the event, coming from 60 countries.

It is one of two annual marathons to have been held in the Mexican capital, alongside the Trabajadores Marathon, which took place in April from 1986 to 2005.

The 2020 edition of the race was cancelled due to the coronavirus pandemic, with all registrants given the option of obtaining a full refund or transferring their entry to 2021 or to another runner for 2021. (Note: Registrants who chose to transfer their entry to 2021 were eligible to also receive the 2020 edition of the marathon medal upon completion of the 2021 marathon.)

In 2024, a runner died at the finish line after running the half marathon event. The runner was Juan Stenner, who was a representative for Mexico at the Guadalajara Pan American Games in 2011. Stenner was not registered for the Mexico City half marathon.

== Disqualifications ==
The Mexico City Marathon has shown unusually high levels of disqualifications of participants.

In 2017, 5806 entrants were disqualified; then in 2018, 3090 entrants were disqualified.

In 2023, approximately 11,000 of the 30,000 entrants were disqualified for not completing "the required distance".

== Course ==
The start point of the race is near Hemiciclo a Juárez in Alameda Central. The course takes a south to north loop on Paseo de la Reforma then follows another loop back, passing Torre Mayor twice. The final part of the race follows Avenida de los Insurgentes westwards to reach the end-point at Estadio Olímpico Universitario. The course overall is slightly uphill with a total rise of around 65 metres. It is largely flat at the beginning, has a hilly section between 10 km and 25 km and ends with an incline in the final ten kilometres.

== Winners ==
Key: Course record

Ed.	Year	Men's winner	Time	Women's winner	Time
1st	1983	Casimiro Reyes (MEX)	2:29:35	María del Carmen Cárdenas (MEX)	3:05:09
2nd	1984	Gerardo Alcalá (MEX)	2:23:35	Maricela Fuentes (MEX)	2:49:37
3rd	1985	Manuel Vera (MEX)	2:22:37	Maricela Fuentes (MEX)	2:51:08
4th	1986	Manuel Garcia Perez (MEX)	2:20:03	María del Carmen Cárdenas (MEX)	2:42:25
5th	1987	Rodolfo Gómez (MEX)	2:18:50	Eileen Claugus (USA)	2:46:30
6th	1988	Salvador García (MEX)	2:19:02	Gloria Ramirez (MEX)	2:47:10
7th	1989	Tesfaye Tafa (ETH)	2:17:54	Flora Moreno (MEX)	2:44:34
8th	1990	Graciano Gonzalez (MEX)	2:19:49	Flora Moreno (MEX)	2:44:48
9th	1991	Inocencio Miranda (MEX)	2:18:53	Aurelia de Jesús (MEX)	2:46:19
10th	1992	Gumercindo Olmedo (MEX)	2:19:25	Petra Guevara (MEX)	2:46:23
11th	1993	Dionicio Cerón (MEX)	2:14:47	María del Carmen Díaz (MEX)	2:43:16
12th	1994	Gumercindo Olmedo (MEX)	2:16:47	Emma Cabrera (MEX)	2:44:49
13th	1995	Jose Esquivel (MEX)	2:18:44	María del Carmen Díaz (MEX)	2:48:45
14th	1996	Juan Gonzalez (MEX)	2:20:14	María del Carmen Díaz (MEX)	2:41:47
15th	1997	Benjamín Paredes (MEX)	2:17:14	María del Carmen Díaz (MEX)	2:39:07
16th	1998	Simon Biwott (KEN)	2:16:48	María Elena Reyna (MEX)	2:42:55
17th	1999	Eliud Kering (KEN)	2:17:55	María Elena Reyna (MEX)	2:51:15 (Note: The 1999 women's race was too long due to a course error, with the athletes running an additional 3 km or so.)
18th	2000	Enrique Montiel (MEX)	2:16:10	Patricia Jardón (MEX)	2:41:50
19th	2001	Alejandro Villanueva (MEX)	2:17:19	Patricia Jardón (MEX)	2:39:41
20th	2002	Enos Kibet (KEN)	2:13:44	Patricia Jardón (MEX)	2:42:43
21st	2003	George Okworo (KEN)	2:18:11	Dulce María Rodríguez (MEX)	2:40:58
22nd	2004	Philip Metto (KEN)	2:18:12	Albina Gallyamova (RUS)	2:43:17
23rd	2005	Reuben Chesang (KEN)	2:19:35	Alicia Rodríguez (MEX)	2:42:31
24th	2006	Christopher Kipyego (KEN)	2:17:23	Estela Xolaltengo (MEX)	2:40:02
25th	2007	Hillary Kipchirchir (KEN)	2:16:06	Anne Jelegat (KEN)	2:38:25
26th	2008	Hillary Kipchirchir (KEN)	2:13:05	Paula Apolonio (MEX)	2:40:26
27th	2009	Edilberto Méndez (MEX)	2:21:34	Isabel Orellana (MEX)	2:54:06
28th	2010	Hillary Kipchirchir (KEN)	2:12:10	Karina Pérez (MEX)	2:39:42
29th	2011	Isaac Kemboi (KEN)	2:14:23	Rose Jebet (KEN)	2:39:08
30th	2012	Peter Nkaya (KEN)	2:15:54	Shewarge Amare (ETH)	2:39:51
31st	2013	Raúl Pacheco (PER)	2:16:56	Gladys Tejeda (PER)	2:37:34
32nd	2014	Raúl Pacheco (PER)	2:18:29	Shewarge Amare (ETH)	2:41:21
33rd	2015	Daniel Derese (ETH)	2:19:24	Shewarge Amare (ETH)	2:41:08
34th	2016	Emmanuel Mnangat (KEN)	2:19:32	Diana Lobačevskė (LIT)	2:40:32
35th	2017	Fikadu Kebede (ETH)	2:17:28	Gladys Tejeda (PER)	2:36:16
36th	2018	Titus Ekiru (KEN)	2:10:38	Etaferahu Woda (ETH)	2:40:10
37th	2019	Duncan Maiyo (KEN)	2:12:50	Vivian Kiplagat (KEN)	2:33:27
38th	2021	Darío Castro (MEX)	2:14:51	Lucy Cheruiyot (KEN)	2:27:22
39th	2022	Edwin Kiptoo (KEN)	2:10:48	Amane Beriso (ETH)	2:25:05
40th	2023	Héctor Garibay (BOL)	2:08:23	Celestine Chepchirchir (KEN)	2:27:17
41st	2024	Edwin Kiptoo (KEN)	2:10:36	Fancy Chemutai (KEN)	2:29:19
42nd	2025	Tadu Abate (ETH)	2:11:17	Bekelech Gudeta (ETH)	2:28:36

=== Wheelchair division ===
Ed.	Year	Men's winner	Time	Women's winner	Time
36th	2018	Alfonzo Zaragoza Solorio	1:42:14	Alicia Ibarra Barajas	2:20:06
37th	2019	Luis Francisco Sanclemente (COL)	1:38:03	Ivonne Reyes Gómez (MEX)	2:07:46

=== Visually impaired division ===
Ed.	Year	Men's winner	Time	Women's winner	Time
31st	2013	Gonzalo Moises Beristain Gutierrez	2:50:20	Silvia Calsada Rios	4:16:55
37th	2019	Rubicel Hernández (MEX)	3:14:03	María de los Ángeles Herrera (MEX)	3:46:20

=== Multiple wins ===
Men's
Athlete	Wins	Years
Hillary Kipchirchir (KEN)	3	2007, 2008, 2010
Gumercindo Olmedo (MEX)	2	1992, 1994
Raúl Pacheco (PER)	2	2013, 2014
Edwin Kiptoo (KEN)	2	2022, 2024

Women's
Athlete	Wins	Years
María del Carmen Díaz (MEX)	4	1993, 1995, 1996, 1997
Patricia Jardón (MEX)	3	2000, 2001, 2002
Shewarge Amare (ETH)	3	2012, 2014, 2015
Maricela Fuentes (MEX)	2	1984, 1985
María del Carmen Cárdenas (MEX)	2	1983, 1986
Flora Moreno (MEX)	2	1989, 1990
María Elena Reyna (MEX)	2	1998, 1999
Gladys Tejeda (PER)	2	2013, 2017

=== By country ===
Country	Total	Men's	Women's
Mexico	43	18	25
Kenya	22	17	5
Ethiopia	10	4	6
Peru	4	2	2
United States	1	0	1
Russia	1	0	1
Lithuania	1	0	1
Bolivia	1	1	0
