= Guadalajara Half Marathon =

Annual race in Mexico since 1985

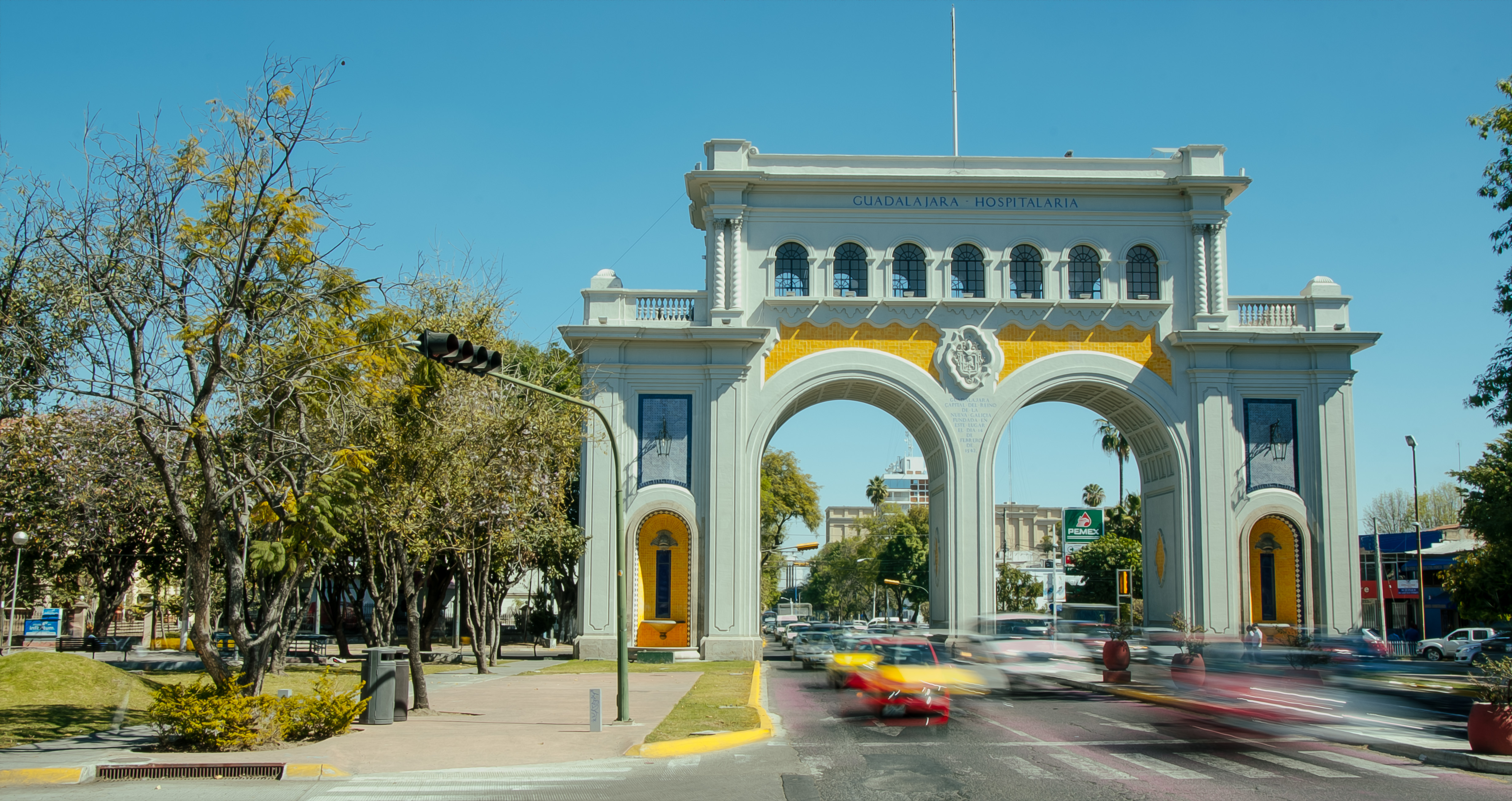
- The Arcos de Guadalajara, near the start and finish area
- Date: February
- Location: Guadalajara, Jalisco, Mexico
- Event type: Road
- Distance: Half marathon
- Primary sponsor: Electrolit, Granvita
- Established: 1985 (41 years ago) (Note: A half marathon event was held in Guadalajara in 1984 as the Guadalajara Marathon.)
- Website: Official website

The Guadalajara Half Marathon (Note: Spanish: Medio Maratón Guadalajara) (also known as the Guadalajara International Half Marathon (Note: Spanish: Medio Maratón Internacional Guadalajara) or 21K GDL) is an annual road-based half marathon hosted by Guadalajara, Mexico, since 1985. The half marathon is a World Athletics Gold Label Road Race and a member of the Association of International Marathons and Distance Races. It is held in February as part of the city's anniversary celebrations.

The event is organized by the Guadalajara Municipal Sports Council, which also organizes the Guadalajara Marathon, a separate marathon event held in October or November.

== History ==
The inaugural race was held on 27 October 1985 as the "Medio Maratón de la Juventud" ('youth half marathon'). Organized by the state government, the race was won by Mexican runners Jorge Frías Rivera and Blanca Silvia Jaime, with finish times of 1:03:48 and 1:21:05, respectively. The Association of Road Racing Statisticians (ARRS) states that the course used in the inaugural race of 1985, as well as those used in 1988 and 1989, "were probably quite short".

According to the ARRS, no race was held in 1990. The ARRS also does not have a record of a race being held in 2003. (Note: ARRS has records of a race held on 3 November 2002 as well as one on 8 February 2004.)

The race was renamed "Medio Maratón Guadalajara" in 1995.

Due to the coronavirus pandemic, the 2021 edition of the race was held exclusively virtually, over a few days in the middle of April. (Note: Originally scheduled from 15 April to 18 April, the virtual race was later extended to 19 April.)

== Course ==
External image
- Course map of half marathon in 2023

The half marathon begins and ends at the Arcos de Guadalajara, near the statue of Minerva. The race is held on roughly an out-and-back course, with an additional out-and-back leg about two-thirds of the way into the race that runs for approximately 2 km (1 mi) of the course.

== Winners ==
Key: Course record

Edition	Year	Men's winner	Time (min:sec)	Women's winner	Time (h:m:s)
1st	1985	Jorge Frías (MEX)	1:03:48	Blanca Jaime (MEX)	1:21:05
2nd	1986	Francisco Pacheco (MEX)	1:06:06	Isabel Castilleja (MEX)	1:18:58
3rd	1987	Dionicio Cerón (MEX)	1:03:09	Maribel Colín (MEX)	1:18:44
4th	1988	Eulalio Martínez (MEX)	1:04:12	Laura Valenzuela (MEX)	1:17:10
5th	1989	Martín Sánchez (MEX)	1:03:51	Rocio Rendón (MEX)	1:19:21
6th	1991	Artemio Nava (MEX)	1:06:51	Alicia Gregorio (MEX)	1:23:24
7th	1992	Héctor Martínez (MEX)	1:06:25	Alicia Gregorio (MEX)	1:23:23
8th	1993	Roberto Alonso (MEX)	1:05:26	Leticia Martínez (MEX)	1:16:14
9th	1994	Dionicio Cerón (MEX)	1:05:39	Leticia Martínez (MEX)	1:20:33
10th	1995	Isidro Rico (MEX)	1:03:45	Nora Rocha (MEX)	1:15:46
11th	1996	Margarito Alonso (MEX)	1:05:07	Emma Cabrera (MEX)	1:18:04
12th	1997	Andrés Espinosa (MEX)	1:05:07	Anette Espinoza (MEX)	1:16:07
13th	1998	Armando Quintanilla (MEX)	1:04:00	María del Carmen Díaz (MEX)	1:14:01
14th	1999	Abraham Assefa (ETH)	1:03:01	América Mateos (MEX)	1:13:33
15th	2000	Dominic Nyabuto (KEN)	1:03:31	Pamela Chepchumba (KEN)	1:13:32
16th	2001	Jackson Koech (KEN)	1:01:15	Deborah Mengich (KEN)	1:16:32
17th	2002	Jackson Koech (KEN)	1:01:41	Pamela Chepchumba (KEN)	1:12:14
18th	2004	Benjamin Kiplimo (KEN)	1:03:12	Madaí Pérez (MEX)	1:12:20
19th	2005	Lazarus Nyakeraka (KEN)	1:04:18	Madaí Pérez (MEX)	1:14:20
20th	2006	Pablo Olmedo (MEX)	1:03:59	Madaí Pérez (MEX)	1:12:27
21st	2007	Hillary Kipchirchir (KEN)	1:03:04	María Elena Valencia (MEX)	1:12:31
22nd	2008	Patrick Nthiwa (KEN)	1:02:36	Patricia Rétiz (MEX)	1:12:29
23rd	2009	Julius Keter (KEN)	1:02:55	Genoveva Kigen (KEN)	1:12:16
24th	2010	Julius Keter (KEN)	1:02:56	Shewarge Alene (ETH)	1:15:26
25th	2011	Julius Keter (KEN)	1:02:31	Shewarge Alene (ETH)	1:11:23
26th	2012	Julius Keter (KEN)	1:02:59	Genoveva Kigen (KEN)	1:13:16
27th	2013	Julius Keter (KEN)	1:03:44	Marisol Romero (MEX)	1:12:18
28th	2014	Julius Keter (KEN)	1:04:26	Mayra Sánchez (MEX)	1:14:26
29th	2015	Juan Luis Barrios (MEX)	1:03:21	Risper Gesabwa (KEN)	1:14:29
30th	2016	Juan Luis Barrios (MEX)	1:04:13	Risper Gesabwa (KEN)	1:13:16
31st	2017	Julius Keter (KEN)	1:03:55	Risper Gesabwa (KEN)	1:14:55
32nd	2018	John Nzau (KEN)	1:03:49	Diana Kipyokei (KEN)	1:10:00
33rd	2019	Mathew Kisorio (KEN)	1:01:48	Afera Godfay (ETH)	1:08:53
34th	2020	Benson Kipruto (KEN)	1:02:13	Lucy Cheruiyot (KEN)	1:10:52
35th	2021	Did not held			
36th	2022	Rhonzas Kilimo (KEN)	1:01:20	Besu Sado (ETH)	1:09:12
37th	2023	Yasin Haji (ETH)	1:01:03	Hiwot Gebrekidan (ETH)	1:09:06
38th	2024	Stephen Kiprop (KEN)	1:01:21	Aberu Ayana (ETH)	1:08:51
39th	2025	Tadu Abate Deme (ETH)	1:02:02	Judy Jelagat Kemboi (KEN)	1:07:47
40th	2026	Gemechu Dida (ETH)	1:03:38	Kolole Mekashu (ETH)	1:12:49

=== Wins by country ===
Country	Men's	Women's	Total
Mexico	16	21	37
Kenya	19	11	30
Ethiopia	4	7	11
