= Athletics at the 1993 Summer Universiade – Men's 5000 metres =

Athletic event

The men's 5000 metres event at the 1993 Summer Universiade was held at the UB Stadium in Buffalo, United States on 15 and 18 July 1993.

== Medalists ==
Gold	Silver	Bronze
Khalid Khannouchi; Morocco	Sergey Fedotov; Russia	Toshinari Takaoka; Japan

== Results ==
=== Heats ===
Rank	Heat	Athlete	Nationality	Time	Notes
1	1	Toshinari Takaoka	Japan	13:47.31	Q
2	1	Sergey Fedotov	Russia	13:47.93	Q
3	1	John Scherer	United States	13:48.10	Q
4	1	Piotr Gładki	Poland	13:51.34	Q
5	2	Markus Neukirch	Germany	13:51.34	Q
6	2	Hendrik Thukwane	South Africa	13:51.65	Q
7	2	Andrea Erni	Switzerland	13:51.71	Q
8	2	Colin Dalton	Australia	13:51.96	Q
9	2	Juan Puerta	Spain	13:52.32	q
10	2	Pasi Mattila	Finland	13:53.00	q
11	1	Alejandro Salvador	Mexico	13:56.04	q
12	1	Jürg Stalder	Switzerland	13:56.98	
13	1	Lahcen Benyoussef	Morocco	14:00.52	
14	3	Khalid Khannouchi	Morocco	14:01.32	Q
15	2	Fatih Çintimar	Turkey	14:04.32	
16	3	Azzeddine Sakhri	Algeria	14:06.14	Q
17	3	Anton Nicolaisen	South Africa	14:08.40	Q
18	2	Christian Leuprecht	Italy	14:09.68	
19	2	Sergio Gómez	Guatemala	14:12.92	
20	3	Julian Paynter	Australia	14:13.34	Q
21	2	John Burke	Ireland	14:16.28	
22	3	Bobby Farren	Ireland	14:17.66	
23	3	Andrew Lyons	Great Britain	14:17.89	
24	3	Imre Berkovics	Hungary	14:20.40	
25	3	Todd Lewis	United States	14:33.95	
26	1	Lenin Guerra	Ecuador	15:01.38	
27	3	Manfred Kheibeb	Namibia	15:16.22	
28	1	Baba Ahmed	Mauritania	19:01.24	
	1	Dmitriy Silantiyev	Russia	DNF	
	1	Stephen Mayaka	Kenya	DNF	
	3	José Rivera	Puerto Rico	DNF	

=== Final ===
Rank	Athlete	Nationality	Time	Notes
1st place, gold medalist(s)	Khalid Khannouchi	Morocco	14:05.33	
2nd place, silver medalist(s)	Sergey Fedotov	Russia	14:06.15	
3rd place, bronze medalist(s)	Toshinari Takaoka	Japan	14:06.21	
4	John Scherer	United States	14:06.74	
5	Colin Dalton	Australia	14:08.01	
6	Julian Paynter	Australia	14:08.54	
7	Anton Nicolaisen	South Africa	14:09.87	
8	Azzeddine Sakhri	Algeria	14:10.41	
9	Pasi Mattila	Finland	14:11.68	
10	Andrea Erni	Switzerland	14:12.40	
11	Hendrik Thukwane	South Africa	14:16.13	
12	Juan Puerta	Spain	14:18.28	
13	Alejandro Salvador	Mexico	14:22.06	
14	Markus Neukirch	Germany	14:23.60	
15	Piotr Gładki	Poland	14:29.14	
