= Mary Akor =

Nigerian-American long-distance runner

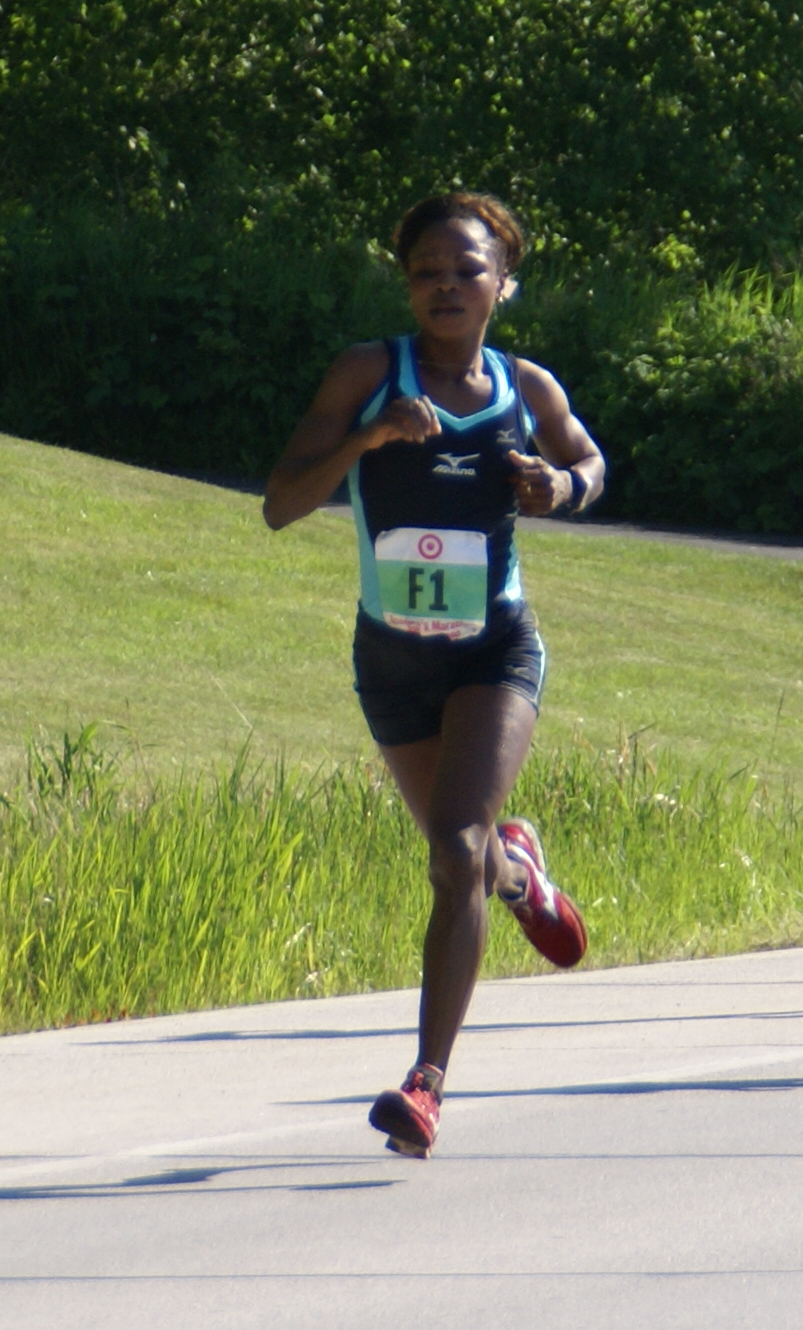
- Mary Akor runs to her third consecutive title at Grandma's Marathon (from Two Harbors to Duluth, Minnesota) in June 2009.

Personal information
- Born: September 24, 1976 (age 49) Nigeria

Achievements and titles
- World finals: 2005, Helsinki, Marathon, 50th 2007, Osaka, Marathon, 42nd
- Personal best(s): Half Marathon: 1:14:19; Marathon: 2:33:50

Mary Adah Akor Beasley (born September 24, 1976) is a Nigerian–American athlete who competed for the US at the 2005 and 2007 World Marathon Championships. In 2006, she was ranked the seventh fastest U.S. woman marathoner of the year; in 2007, the sixth. She runs (and often wins) multifarious marathons around the United States, Mexico and Africa. After running the Gobernador Marathon in Mexicali, Mexico, in December 2012, she was found to be using a banned substance. She accepted her sanction and returned to competition in 2015.

She is the women's national record-holder in the marathon distance for Nigeria.

== Early career ==
Like many of her peers, Akor began running at a young age in her home of Nigeria. She took to the longer distances and ran her first marathon at the age of 13. When she was 15, she had qualified for the 1992 Olympic Games, but the Nigerian Olympic Committee decided against sending her to Barcelona, Spain (and ultimately not sending any women runners except the 4x100 meter team, which earned a silver).

In 1993, 16-year-old Mary Akor came to the United States to live near cousins in Pasadena, California. She was the sole runner on the John Muir High School cross country team and made it to the state meet.

She then went to California State-Dominguez Hills college and ran cross country, but transitioned to El Camino College in Alondra Park, California. She ran from 1997 to 1999 and competed at the state's 10,000-meter and 5,000-meter and 3,000-meter track events. In her first year, she became the CCCAA champion in all three events as she led the Warriors to a team championship.

She graduated, earning a degree in social work. In 2006, she was inducted into the El Camino College Hall of Fame.

== Professional career ==
At the 2005 World Championship Marathon in Helsinki, Finland, she lined up with the best in the world, which included her US teammates Turena Johnson-Lane, Jill Boaz, Emily Levan and Jenny Crain. But it would be the British runner Paula Radcliffe who would storm the race and win in the fastest time ever for a championship race: 2:20:57. Johnson-Lane was the first US finisher at 26th place. Akor finished 50th in nearly three hours.

In the early fall of 2007, Akor was at the starting line of her second Marathon World Championship race, this time in Osaka, Japan. After the gun went off, Catherine Ndereba negotiated the course with aplomb and took the win in 2:30:37. The first US finisher was Anna Alyanak (31st in 2:42:23), followed by Zoila Gomez (35th) and Dana Coons (38th). Akor finished 42nd in 2:47:06, just before German Susanne Hahn.

=== Grandma's Marathon three-peat ===
In 2005, Akor ran and placed second at Grandma's Marathon, a point-to-point race in Minnesota from Two Harbors to Duluth. The year previous, she had placed 27th at the event's half marathon (named after local Olympian, Garry Bjorklund). Her second-place finish in 2005 landed her in the prize money, and she returned in 2006 to finish fourth, but moved to third after winner Halina Karnatsevich was found to be doping.

In 2007, Grandma's Marathon had instituted a drug-testing policy. Akor was 30 years old and faster than ever. She ran 2:35:40 in the 70-degree heat to beat all women including Liza Hunter-Galvan and Russian Ramilya Burangulova and Tatyana Titova. Afterward, she voiced support for the drug testing and said she was working through her asthma without taking an inhaler that might disqualify her.

It began a dominant streak, as she returned every June to win a total of three titles ('07, '08 in a headwind with a time of 2:41:43; and '09 in 2:36:52 en route to the medical tent for severe dehydration), defeating runners such as Zinaida Semenova, Violetta Kryza, Janet Cherobon, Alina Ivanova, Serkalem Abrha, and Robyn Friedman. The only other woman to win three in a row is Olympic marathon bronze-medalist Lorraine Moller.

In 2010, her streak ended when she finished fourth as Buzunesh Deba ran to the win. In 2011, she dropped out after 20 miles. The following year, she ran the half again, competing in the National Championship. She finished 19th in the race won by Kara Goucher. She attempted a comeback to Grandma's Marathon in 2017, finishing 12th, then moving up to 11th in 2019, where she was the first master's finisher. The organization did not award her prize money though, instead the next master's woman (Heather Lieberg) received it.

=== PR and Boston Marathon ===
In the two years of '06 and '07, Akor ran an average of a marathon every two months. She was named the third-best American woman marathoner in 2007 by Running Times magazine, behind Deena Kastor and Ann Alyanak (though she was ranked sixth-best by Track and Field News).

She achieved her personal record time for the distance at the Twin Cities Marathon in October 2006, where she ran 2:33:50 for second place behind Marla Runyan and ahead of Zoila Gomez and Michelle Lilienthal.

She finished as the fourth American at the 2007 Boston Marathon (in 2:41:01, she was 10th overall). That year, she competed at the 2007 World Marathon Championships in Osaka, Japan, and finished 42nd in 2:47:06.

In 2009, at the Boston Marathon, Akor was in the top pace pack with Americans Kara Goucher and Elva Dryer, though Kenyan Salina Kosgei broke away for the win. Akor finished 13th in 2:41:09.

Akor was considered a top American contender at the 2012 Boston Marathon along with Ruth Perkins and Lauren Philbrook.

=== Banned substance case ===
In the last month of 2012, at the Gobernador Marathon in Mexicali, Mexico, her drug test result showed use of Clenbuterol, a substance banned by the United States Anti-Doping Agency. She would later claim the drug came from her asthma medication or the beef in Mexico. She also claimed that her inability to hire an expensive lawyer kept her from getting cleared (while other athletes were getting away with use of the same substance).

The positive test prompted a back-and-forth case that lasted nearly a year. In November 2013, she accepted a two-year ban. Her results from December 6, 2012, to November 5, 2013, were all changed to disqualifications.

She was involved in an award-ceremony brouhaha in 2018 after the finish of the Lagos Marathon in Nigeria. She had run the marathon before (in 2016) and finished ninth, winning $4,000. By 2018, the organizers were seeking to grow the race and achieve IAAF Gold Medal status for their race, so they set aside large prize purses for the top finishers and prizes for the top Nigerian runners as well.

Almenesh Herpha took first place in 2:38:23. Akor was several places back, but finished ahead of all the other Nigerian women. She thought she had won the top prize for Nigerians, but another woman was announced at the prize ceremony. Undaunted, Akor took to the stage and attempted to claim the prize check. Security attempted to remove her from the stage while officials reminded her that she was ineligible to compete as top Nigerian because she had committed to run for the United States. In the chaos, the crowd demanded she receive her winnings. Instead of throwing her out, the officials relented by allowing her to stay on the stage and hold the prize check. However, they refused to award her winnings and disqualified her in the official results.

=== Returning to race ===
She returned to competition after her ban, even though many races say they withhold prize money from those who have served bans. Still, she would collect wins and prize money since many race organizations didn't know or felt it would be unfair to withhold cash for the winner.

At the 2019 Austin Marathon, Akor was involved in a strange case of cutting off another runner. She wore a long-sleeve that obscured her bib, and she weaved over the road to prevent the second-place runner (Heather Lieberg) from passing her. The race officials disqualified her.

She returned to the Gobernador Marathon in 2019, though they had rebranded as the Baja California Marathon. She won in 2:47:38 (as "Mary Adah Akor Beasley").

Despite her past troubles, she raced in the 2020 US Olympic Trials Marathon. She finished 295th (2:52:53) in a field that was record-breaking for the number of qualifiers.

In 2022, Mary Akor appeared with the elites at the 45th running of the Detroit Marathon under her new name: Mary Beasley. She was coming off two second-place finishes (The Orange County Half and the Mexicali Half Marathon). On the roads of Detroit, she cruised to an uncontested victory, finishing in 2:42:25 and collecting $6,000. Afterward, some voiced concern about Akor winning. Marathon officials said there was no mechanism to change the result. By December, however, they adopted an anti-doping policy for their race that declared ineligible any athlete who had "ever been suspended for use of a prohibited substance by the USADA and/or WADA."

She signed up as an elite at the Austin Marathon, but either didn't start or didn't finish. At the end of November, she traveled to Santiago de los Caballeros in the Dominican Republic for the AIMS-certified Maratón Monumental Primer Santiago de América. She ran as "Mary Akprbeasly" and outpaced Ednah Kimitei and Soranyi Rodríguez to finish first in 2:41:55, netting $8,000.

In the last month of 2022, she took home the first prize for a marathon in Veracruz, Mexico. Then she returned to the Baja California Marathon to re-establish her dominance, but finished second to Shewarge Amare Alene

Her race schedule continued strong into 2023. She ran and won the largest marathon in the Yucatan, the Mérida Marathon, where she won in 2013 (before her DQ) and 2020. She took the tape again, clocking 2:48:20 and collapsing at the finish line after edging Mexican athlete Estafany Velásquez by a few seconds. She returned to the Baja Marathon in December, outpaced the competition, and won in 2:41:47, taking home about $4,300. The men's side was won by American CJ Albertson, who broke the course record.

== Personal life ==
Akor is the oldest of nine children. After arriving in the United States, she gained dual citizenship of Nigeria and the U.S. in 2003, and she chose to represent the U.S. after 2004.

Akor has worked as a nurse while also running at a professional level. She has been, at times, self-coached and has resided in or near Hawthorne, California, while she has also trained in Mexico and Kenya.

== Achievements ==
Year	Competition	Venue	Position	Event	Notes
1996	Western Hemisphere Marathon	Culver City, California	1st	Marathon	2:56:22
2001	Western Hemisphere Marathon	Culver City, California	1st	Marathon	3:03:54
2002	Gobernador Marathon	Mexicali, Mexico	1st	Marathon	2:50:55
2003	Culiacán Marathon	Culiacán, Mexico	1st	Marathon	2:51:55
2003	Gobernador Marathon	Mexicali, Mexico	1st	Marathon	2:55:59
2004	Culiacán Marathon	Culiacán, Mexico	1st	Marathon	2:50:55
2004	Gobernador Marathon	Mexicali, Mexico	1st	Marathon	2:52:18
2004	Vancouver Marathon	Vancouver, Canada	1st	Marathon	2:44:43
2005	Big Sur Marathon	Carmel, California	1st	Marathon	2:46:53
2006	Gobernador Marathon	Mexicali, Mexico	1st	Marathon	2:40:52
2006	Twin Cities Marathon	Minneapolis-Saint Paul, Minnesota	2nd	Marathon	2:33:50
2006	Grandma's Marathon	Two Harbors-Duluth, Minnesota	3rd	Marathon	2:39:42
2007	Grandma's Marathon	Two Harbors-Duluth, Minnesota	1st	Marathon	2:35:40
2007	Gobernador Marathon	Mexicali, Mexico	1st	Marathon	2:47:37
2008	Vancouver Marathon	Vancouver, Canada	1st	Marathon	2:37:54
2008	Grandma's Marathon	Two Harbors-Duluth, Minnesota	1st	Marathon	2:38:50
2009	Vancouver Marathon	Vancouver, Canada	1st	Marathon	2:37:54
2009	Grandma's Marathon	Two Harbors-Duluth, Minnesota	1st	Marathon	2:46:24
2009	Panama City Marathon	Panama City, Panama	1st	Marathon	2:50:56
2011	Tijuana International	Tijuana, Mexico	1st	Marathon	2:37:57
2012	Des Moines Marathon	Des Moines, Iowa	1st	Marathon	2:35:01
2012	Gran Pacifico Mazatlán	Mazatlán, Mexico	1st	Marathon	2:48:31
2012	Cleveland Marathon	Cleveland, Ohio	1st	Marathon	2:39:49
2012–13	Various Races	US and Mexico	DQ	various	n/a
2016	Tijuana International	Tijuana, Mexico	1st	Marathon	2:43:06
2016	Cancun Marathon	Cancun, Mexico	1st	Marathon	2:47:56
2016	Long Beach Marathon	Long Beach, California	1st	Marathon	2:46:49
2016	Gobernador Marathon	Mexicali, Mexico	1st	Marathon	2:44:03
2018	Long Beach Marathon	Long Beach, California	1st	Marathon	2:54:12
2019	Baja Marathon	Mexicali, Mexico	1st	Marathon	2:47:38
2020	Mérida Marathon	Mérida, Mexico	1st	Marathon	2:46:31
2022	Detroit Marathon	Detroit, Michigan	1st	Marathon	2:42:25
2022	Monumental Marathon; Primer Santiago de América	Santiago, Dominican Republic	1st	Marathon	2:41:55
2022	Baja Marathon	Mexicali, Mexico	2nd	Marathon	2:37:43
2023	Mérida Marathon	Mérida, Mexico	1st	Marathon	2:42:28
2023	Baja Marathon	Mexicali, Mexico	1st	Marathon	2:41:47
2023	Hermosillo Marathon	Hermosillo, Mexico	1st	Marathon	2:44:13

*Citations: World Athletics, American Association of Road Racing Statisticians, various news reports
