= John Scherer =

American long-distance runner

Personal information
- Born: November 3, 1966 (age 59)

Sport
- Country: United States
- Events: 5000 m, 10000 m
- College team: Michigan Wolverines
- Club: Nike

Achievements and titles
- Personal bests: 3000 m: 7:45.12; 5000 m: 13:36.47; 5k road: 13:46; 10000 m: 28:16.24; 10k road: 29:01

John Scherer (born November 3, 1966) is an American former long-distance runner who ran professionally for Nike and collegiately for the Michigan Wolverines, where he was a two time NCAA Division I champion in the 10000 meter outdoor, and one-time champ in the 5000 meter indoor. Additionally, he competed in the 1992 U.S. Olympic trials and qualified for the finals in the 5000 meter.

== Professional ==
Scherer competed professionally from 1989 to 1996, winning a total of $9,065 in prize money. He ran for Nike, and was a finalist in the 1992 U.S. Olympic trials despite tendinitis which cut his weekly mileage in half and kept him out of the 10000 meter.

== Major competition ==
=== Domestic competition ===
Date	Finish	Distance	Time	Meeting	Place	Prize money
24 Mar 1996	3	8 km	23:40	Sportsmark Shamrock Shuffle	Chicago	$150
04 Dec 1994	24	10.2 km	30:47	Reebok/USATF Cross Country Championships	Portland	$115
17 Jun 1994	13	10,000 m	30:40.36	USA/Mobil Outdoor Championships	Knoxville	
04 Jun 1994	2	5 km	14:09	Sunburst	South Bend	$1,000
28 Apr 1994	1	10,000 m	28:20.33	Penn Relays	Philadelphia	
05 Feb 1994	5	12 km	37:06	US World Cross Country Trials	Eugene	
27 Nov 1993	37	10 km	31:11	Reebok/USA Cross Country Championships	Missoula	
16 Oct 1993	5	10 km	29:26	Bowling Green Medical Center/Trans Financial Bank	Bowling Green	$800
19 Jun 1993	4	5000 m	13:46.53	USA/Mobil Outdoor Championships	Eugene	
22 Apr 1993	14	10,000 m	29:29.25	Penn Relays	Philadelphia	
26 Jun 1992	16	5000 m	14:49.62	US Olympic Track and Field Trials- Final	New Orleans	
24 Jun 1992	2	5000 m	13:56.91	US Olympic Track and Field Trials- Semi #2	New Orleans	
06 Jun 1992	9	5000 m	13:47.58	Prefontaine Classic	Eugene	
08 Feb 1992	9	12 km	36:41	TAC/USA World Cross Country Trials	Eugene	
30 Nov 1991	3	10 km	29:35	USA Cross Country Championships	Boston	
14 Jun 1991	7	10,000 m	28:32.58	USA/Mobil Outdoor Championships	New York City	
4 May 1991	4	5 km	13:52	All Iowa	Cedar Rapids	$600
22 Feb 1991	4	3 km	7:51.80	USA/Mobil Indoor Championships	New York City	
01 Feb 1991	3	3 km	7:50.24	Snickers Millrose Games	New York City	
17 Nov 1990	2	10 km	29:01	Pepsi Vulcan Run	Birmingham	$1,650
28 Oct 1990	5	5 km	13:54	Rogaine	Chicago	$850
15 Jun 1990	4	10,000 m	28:16.24	USA/Mobil Outdoor Championships	Norwalk	
20 May 1990	5	10 km	29:03	Manufacturer's Hanover Lilac	Rochester	$600
28 Apr 1990	1	10,000 m	28:50.43	Penn Relays Olympic Development	Philadelphia	
01 Apr 1990	4	10 km	29:41	Azalea	Dallas	$500
10 Feb 1990	25	11.93 km	35:10	USA Cross Country Trials	Seattle	
04 Jul 1989	20	10 km	29:50	AJC Peachtree Road Race	Atlanta	$50
15 Jun 1989	3	10,000 m	28:58.18	USA/Mobil Outdoor Championships	Houston	
01 Jun 1989	1	10,000 m	29:48.95	NCAA Division I Outdoor Championships	Provo	
10 Mar 1989	1	5000 m	14:18.05	NCAA Division I Indoor Championships	Indianapolis	
03 Jun 1988	1	10,000 m	28:50.39	NCAA Division I Outdoor Championships	Eugene	
23 Nov 1987	2	10 km	29:21	NCAA Division I Cross Country Championships	Charlottesville	
05 Jun 1987	10	10,000 m	29:52.11	NCAA Division I Outdoor Championships	Baton Rouge	
24 Nov 1986	23	10 km	31:32	NCAA Division I Cross Country Championships	Tucson	

=== International competition ===
Date	Finish	Distance	Time	Meeting	Location
09 Apr 1994	6	8 km	23:43	Brooks Spring Runoff	Toronto
26 Mar 1994	207	12 km	38:27	IAAF/Snickers World Cross Country Championships	Budapest
15 Jul 1993	4	5000 m	14:06.74	World University Games	Buffalo
15 Dec 1991	5	5000 m	14:02	Chiba International Ekiden- Leg 4	Chiba
20 Jul 1991	10	10,000 m	28:59.22	World University Games	Sheffield
06 Jul 1991	23	10,000 m	29:45.80	Mobil Bislett Games	Oslo
01 Jul 1991	7	3 km	7:50.29	Meeting BNP	Lille
27 Jun 1991	14	5 km	13:37.99	Maxell World Games	Helsinki
21 Jun 1991	7	3 km	7:58.28	Nike Meeting Neubrandeburg	Neubrandenburg
10 Mar 1991	5	3 km	7:45.12	IAAF World Indoor Championships	Seville
08 Mar 1991	3	3 km	7:49.05	IAAF World Indoor Championships- Heat 2	Seville
27 Aug 1989	8	10,000 m	29:05.22	World University Games	Duisburg
