= Mérida Marathon =

- Date: January
- Location: Mérida
- Event type: Road
- Distance: Marathon
- Primary sponsor: Banorte
- Established: 1986
- Course records: Men's: 2:10:53 (1992) (Cuba) Alberto Cuba; Women's: 2:39:28 (2006) (Kenya) Lucy Njeri Muhami
- Website: Mérida Marathon
- Participants: 4,000

The Mérida Marathon (also known as the Maraton de Ciudad de Mérida or Maratón Mérida Banorte) is a 26.2-mile footrace along the streets of Mérida, Mexico. It was first run in 1986. The run celebrates the founding of the city. In 2020, 4,000 runners participated in the event. The race travels through the heart of "The White City," the capital of the Mexican state of Yucatan. The course travels on the Paseo de Montejo past monuments and churches that date back to the 1500s.

== History ==
The marathons of 1986 and 1987 were sponsored by the company Mericolor. In 1992, two competing marathons were held in the city: The 450th Anniversary Marathon of the Mérida Foundation and the VII Mérida City Marathon. In 1994, 1996, 1997 and 1998, no marathons were held in the city of Mérida. The 2021 running was offered as a "virtual" race.

The race is not associated with the Rock and Roll Merida Half Marathon that was previously run in September.

== Race Weekend ==
The race weekend includes the marathon, a half marathon, a 10K run and a 3K walk. A wheelchair category is also included.

== Winners ==
Date	Edition	Men	Time	Women	Time
30-11-1986	I Maratón Ciudad de Mérida Mericolor	José Santos Valle Paredes Mexico	2:40.38	Rosa María González R. Mexico	4:04.06
8-11-1987	II Maratón Ciudad de Mérida Mericolor	José Santos Valle Paredes Mexico	2:44.26	Martina Ruiz Mexico	3:56.25
18-12-1988	III Maratón Ciudad de Mérida	Jorge Barceló Gala Mexico	2:34.03	Charlotte Bradley Reus Mexico	3:30.22
17-12-1989	IV Maratón Ciudad de Mérida	Jorge Barceló Gala Mexico	2:43.53	Candelaria Segovia Sánchez Mexico	3:25.44
18-11-1990	V Maratón Ciudad de Mérida	Jorge Barceló Gala Mexico	2:31.16	Rosa María González R. Mexico	3:59.22
17-11-1991	VI Maratón Ciudad de Mérida	Radamés González Cuba	2:18.47	Susana Pérez López Mexico	3:10.01
5-1-1992	Maratón 450 Aniversario Fundación de Mérida	Juan José Marinero Méndez Mexico	2:16.10	Emma Cabrera Palafox Mexico	2:54.51
13-12-1992	VII Maratón Ciudad de Mérida	Alberto Cuba Carrero Cuba	2:10.53	Susana Pérez López Mexico	2:53.10
12-12-1993	VIII Maratón de la Ciudad de Mérida	Jesús Valdez Falcón Mexico	2:18.52	Angélica Espinosa Mexico	2:56.00
8-1-1995	IX Maratón Internacional Ciudad de Mérida	Jesús Valdez Falcón Mexico	2:20.32	Guadalupe Román Mexico	2:56.09
10-1-1999	Maratón 457 Aniversario Fundación de Mérida	Francisco Bautista Cuamatzi Mexico	2:23.41	Blanca Juárez Romero Mexico	2:55.02
9-1-2000	Maratón 458 Aniversario Fundación de Mérida	Odilón Cuahutle Rojas Mexico	2:18.55	Emma Cabrera Palafox Mexico	2:44.30
7-1-2001	Maratón 459 Aniversario Fundación de Mérida	Bemjamín Paredes Martínez Mexico	2:15.12	Emma Cabrera Palafox Mexico	2:55.26
6-1-2002	Maratón 460 Aniversario Fundación de Mérida	Jackson Kipngok Kenya	2:18.44	Blanca Juárez Romero Mexico	2:55.40
5-1-2003	Maratón 461 Aniversario Fundación de Mérida	James Bungei Kenya	2:24.24	Marina Valencia Hernández Mexico	2:55.33
11-1-2004	Maratón 462 Aniversario Fundación de Mérida 2004	Reuben Chesang Kenya	2:24.10	María Blanca Juárez Romero Mexico	2:57.51
9-1-2005	Maratón 463 Aniversario Fundación de Mérida 2005	Leonard Ngigi Njengwa Kenya	2:23.25	Irene Vázquez López Mexico	2:53.00
8-1-2006	Maratón 464 Aniversario Fundación de Mérida 2006	Leonard Ngigi Njengwa Kenya	2:19.50	Lucy Njeri Muhami Kenya	2:39.28
7-1-2007	Maratón 465 Aniversario Fundación de Mérida 2007	Reuben Chesang Kenya	2:22.11	Penélope Lona Guerrero Mexico	2:58.05
6-1-2008	Maratón 466 Aniversario Fundación de Mérida 2008	Samwel Kiprotich Cherop Kenya	2:17.45	Alice Ndirangu Waruguru Kenya	2:44.59
11-1-2009	Maratón 2009 467 Aniversario de la Fundación de Mérida	Anthony Nabithi Mukuthi Kenya	2:25.11	Caroline Katam Chemwolo Kenya	2:56.23
10-1-2010	Maratón 2010 468 Aniversario de la Fundación de Mérida	Paul Gatheru Wachira Kenya	2:22.22	Sara Cedillo Sánchez Mexico	2:49.22
9-1-2011	Maratón 2011 469 Aniversario de la Fundación de Mérida	Hugo Romero Méndez Mexico	2:21.59	Alice Ndirangu Waruguru Kenya	2:44.30
8-1-2012	Maratón 2012 470 Aniversario de la Fundación de Mérida	Stephen Mburi Njoroge Kenya	2:16.35	Truphena Jemeli Tarus Kenya	2:42.37
6-1-2013	Maratón 2013 471 Aniversario de la Fundación de Mérida	Festus Kioko Kikumu Kenya	2:25.58	Mary Akor United States	2:44.40
12-1-2014	Maratón 2014 472 Aniversario de la Fundación de Mérida	Hillary Kipchirchir Kimaiyo Kenya	2:21.23	Shewarge Alene Amare Ethiopia	2:42.33
11-1-2015	Maratón 2015 473 Aniversario de la Fundación de Mérida	Alene Emere Reta Ethiopia	2:19.26	Caroline Jebiwot Kiptoo Kenya	2:51.06
8-1-2017	Maratón 2017 475 Aniversario de la Fundación de Mérida	Julius Kipyego Kenya	2:21:21	Amare Sheware Ethiopia	2:54:00
7-1-2018	Maratón 2018 476 Aniversario de la Fundación de Mérida	Simon Kiriuki Njoroge	2:22:13	Leah Jebiwot Kigen	2:53:31
6-1-2019	Maratón 2019 477 Aniversario de la Fundación de Mérida	Julius Kipyego Keter Kenya	2:20:35	Caroline Jebiwot Kiptoo Kenya	2:47:51
5-1-2020	Mérido Maratón Banorte, 478 Aniversario de la Fundación de Mérida	Sonde Gesahegn Abera Ethiopia	2:17:19	Mary Akor Beasley United States	2:46:31
1-1-2021	Mérido Maratón Banorte, 479 Aniversario de la Fundación de Mérida	canceled due to the COVID-19 Pandemic	n/a	canceled due to the COVID-19 Pandemic	n/a
9-1-2022	Mérido Maratón Banorte, 480 Aniversario de la Fundación de Mérida	Erick Monyenye Mose	2:32:31	Leah Jebiwot Kigen	2:54:28
8-1-2023	Mérido Maratón Banorte, 481 Aniversario de la Fundación de Mérida	Erick Monyenye Mose	2:22:33	Mary Akor Beasley United States	2:42:28
