= Dayna Pidhoresky =

Canadian long-distance runner

Personal information
- Born: 18 November 1986 (age 39) Windsor, Ontario, Canada
- Height: 165 cm (5 ft 5 in)
- Weight: 49 kg (108 lb)

Sport
- Sport: Distance running
- Events: Half-marathon, marathon

Achievements and titles
- Personal bests: 10 km: 33:15 (2026); Half-Marathon: 1:11:37 (2026); Marathon: 2:26:02 (2026)

Dayna Pidhoresky (born 18 November 1986) is a Canadian long-distance runner and Olympian. She competed in the women's marathon at the 2017 World Championships in Athletics and the 2020 Tokyo Olympics.

On 20 October 2019, Pidhoresky won the Canadian Olympic Trials Marathon in a time of 2:29.03. Her performance secured her position for the 2020 Tokyo Olympic Marathon representing Canada. However, on the flight to Tokyo, Pidhoresky was seated next to a passenger who subsequently tested positive for COVID-19, and as a result was required to quarantine for fourteen days without access to training facilities. Despite this, she opted to compete, finishing the race in seventy-third and last place with a time of 3:03:10. She said that "a month ago, that would have been so disappointing because I had big goals, but as we approached the race I really had to alter my goals. I didn't think I was going to make it to the start line."

Pidhoresky previously held the Canadian women's record for the Vancouver Marathon with a time of 2:33:25. Her 2023 record was also the overall women's record for the course until 2026. She is a 3 time champion of the event.
