= Big Sur International Marathon =

Annual marathon in California, US

Coordinates: 36°32′10″N 121°54′44″W

- Date: Last Sunday in April
- Location: Big Sur, California, United States
- Event type: Road
- Distance: Marathon, 21-mile, 11-mile, 12km, 5km, 3km
- Established: 1986
- Website: Big Sur International Marathon
- Participants: 3,324 finishers (2022); 3,486 finishers (2019)

The Big Sur International Marathon is an annual marathon held in California, United States along the Pacific coast. The marathon was established in 1986 and attracts about 4,500 participants annually.

In addition to the marathon, the event usually includes a 21-mile (34 km) race, a relay, a 5K run, and various walks. Runners in the marathon have 6 hours in which to complete it. Since the marathon was first run, over $2 million in grants has been disbursed to charities.

The finish line for all events is the Crossroads Shopping Center in Carmel, California. The Marathon follows California State Route 1, beginning south of Pfeiffer Big Sur State Park and crossing the Bixby Creek Bridge at its halfway point. Hurricane Point is the summit of 560 feet between mile markers 10 and 12. There are 11 aid stations along the route. The marathon course is known for its challenging hills in the second half of the race. Due to landslides along Highway 1, the marathon course was modified to an out-and-back route beginning at the finish line in Carmel in 1998, 2011, and 2024.

The Power Walk and 21-mile (34 km) race begin at Andrew Molera State Park, and the 10.6-mile (17.1 km) walk and run begin at Rocky Point Restaurant. The 9-mile (14 km) and 5 km races begin and end at the finish line.

The 2020 and 2021 editions of the race were cancelled due to the coronavirus pandemic, with all registrants of the 2020 edition receiving a 60% refund and given the option to sign up during a priority registration period for 2022 or 2023. (Note: It had initially been postponed before being cancelled.)

== Winners ==
Year	Overall winner	From	Time	Female Winner	From	Time
1996	Hector Lopez	Los Angeles, CA	2:24:58	Svetlana Vasilyeva	Reddick, FL	2:41:34
1997	Srba Nikolic	Brooklyn, NY	2:27:51	Kim Marie Goff	Gilford, NH	2:57:12
1998	Srba Nicolic	Brooklyn, NY	2:21:36	Janina Saxer	Zürich, Switzerland	2:46:24
1999	Arsenio Ortiz	Ozone Park, NY	2:19:16	Susan Morris	Encinitas, CA	2:52:24
2000	Esteban Vanegas	Alma, MI	2:27:06	Natalia Solominskaia	Vucan-Vude, Russia	2:46:53
2001	Arsenio Ortiz	Ozone Park, NY	2:25:38	Janna Malkova	Albuquerque, NM	2:46:41
2002	Jonathan Ndambuki	Incline Villa, NV	2:18:05	Julieanne White	Vista, CA	2:51:10
2003	Jonathan Ndambuki	Incline Villa, NV	2:19:59	Julieanne White	San Jacinto, CA	2:47:11
2004	Ibrahim Limo	Cary, NC	2:26:19	Suzy West	Putney, VT	3:10:02
2005	Jonathan Ndambuki	Santa Fe, NM	2:23:35	Mary Akor	Gardena, CA	2:46:53
2006	Charles Nyakundi	Kenya	2:21:43	Mary Coordt	Elk Grove, CA	2:59:18
2007	Jeff Gardina	Santa Cruz, CA	2:25:48	Michelle Thomas	San Luis Obispo, CA	3:02:09
2008	Andy Martin	Bend, OR	2:29:50	Kris Lawson	Parker, CO	3:00:53
2009	Ryan Hafer	Colorado Springs, CO	2:32:17	Mary Coordt	Elk Grove, CA	2:56:06
2010	Daniel Tapia	Castroville, CA	2:26:09	Veronica Clemens	New York, NY	2:55:18
2011	Jesus Campos	King City, CA	2:31:54	Beth Woodward	Orrville, OH	3:05:05
2012	Adam Roach	Pacific Grove, CA	2:32:25	Nuța Olaru	Longmont, CO	2:50:08
2013	Adam Roach	Monterey, CA	2:27:46	Nuța Olaru	Longmont, CO	2:50:02
2014	Michael Wardian	Arlington, VA	2:27:45	Nuța Olaru	Longmont, CO	2:53:15
2015	Adam Roach	Monterey, CA	2:30:48	Malia Crouse	Edgewater, CO	2:57:02
2016	Adam Roach	Pebble Beach, CA	2:35:36	Magdalena Boulet	Oakland, CA	3:01:27
2017	Michael Wardian	Arlington, VA	2:30:29	Tegan Searle	Monterey, CA	3:01:47
2018	Adam Roach	Pebble Beach, CA	2:29:26	Julia Rhie	Chapel Hill, NC	3:01:16
2019	Jordan Tropf	Baltimore, MD	2:25:23	D'Ann Arthur	Redondo Beach, CA	2:48:41
2020	cancelled due to coronavirus pandemic					
2021	cancelled due to coronavirus pandemic					
2022	Jordan Tropf	Silver Spring, MD	2:26:51	Anne Flower	Covington, KY	2:49:50
2023	Ben Bruce	Flagstaff, AZ	2:36:59	Anne Flower	Covington, KY	2:55:58
2024	Simon Ricci	San Francisco, CA	2:29:31	Peyton Bilo	Rescue, CA	2:55:10

The Ultimate Guide to Marathons described the Big Sur Marathon as the best marathon in the world.
