= Gran Maratón Pacifico =

Annual footrace in Mazatlán, Sinaloa, Mexico

- Date: December
- Location: Mazatlán, Sinaloa, Mexico
- Event type: Road
- Distance: Marathon
- Primary sponsor: Pacífico Brewery
- Established: 1999
- Course records: Men's: ' Women's:
- Website: Gran Maratón Pacifico

The Gran Maratón Pacifico (also known as Gran Pacífico Mazatlán Maratón or Gran Pacific Marathon) is a 26.2-mile footrace through the city of Mazatlán, in the state of Sinaloa, Mexico. The race, first held in 1999, is one of the largest in the country and has seen fast times at both the full marathon and half marathon distance. The race is surrounded by events during the race weekend, which takes place during the Festival of Light (Spanish: "Festival de la Luz Mazatlán") in late November or early December.

== Race weekend ==
The race weekend includes a 5K run, a 10k run, a half marathon, a 10k wheelchair race, races for children, and a "lend me your legs" (Spanish: "Prestame tus Piernas") race in which three runners aid a non-able-bodied person. The race weekend often draws 12,000 runners from several countries and it is a Boston Marathon qualifier.

== Course ==
The route takes runners through the city, past a tall lighthouse, and along the length of the longest pier in the world, the Mazatlan Pier.

== Cancellations ==
Due to the COVID-19 pandemic, the 2020 and 2021 races were not held.

== Half Marathon results ==
Key: Course record

	Men					Women					
Year	Place	Name	Age	Country	Time	Year	Place	Name	Age	Country	Time
2021		Race cancelled due to COVID-19 pandemic*				2021		Race cancelled due to COVID-19 pandemic*			
2020		Race cancelled due to COVID-19 pandemic*				2020		Race cancelled due to COVID-19 pandemic*			
2019	1st place, gold medalist(s)	Fernando Cervantes		Mexico	1:06:49	2019	1st place, gold medalist(s)	Ursula Sánchez		Mexico	1:13:13
2019	2nd place, silver medalist(s)	Wilfred Nyatogo		Kenya	1:07:24	2019	2nd place, silver medalist(s)	Sonia Laguna		Mexico	1:19:34
2019	3rd place, bronze medalist(s)	Christopher Kipyego		Kenya	1:08:52	2019	3rd place, bronze medalist(s)	Joan Cherop		Kenya	1:21:36

== Marathon results ==
Key: Course record

	Men					Women					
Year	Place	Name	Age	Country	Time	Year	Place	Name	Age	Country	Time
2021		Race cancelled due to COVID-19 pandemic*				2021		Race cancelled due to COVID-19 pandemic*			
2020		Race cancelled due to COVID-19 pandemic*				2020		Race cancelled due to COVID-19 pandemic*			
2019	1st place, gold medalist(s)					2019	1st place, gold medalist(s)				
2019	2nd place, silver medalist(s)					2019	2nd place, silver medalist(s)				
2019	3rd place, bronze medalist(s)					2019	3rd place, bronze medalist(s)				
2018	1st place, gold medalist(s)	Nixon Kiplagat Cherutich		Kenya	2:19:59	2018	1st place, gold medalist(s)	Daniela Alejandra Alonso Arreola		Mexico	2:47:23
2018	2nd place, silver medalist(s)	Richard Oendo Ondimu		Kenya	2:20:18	2018	2nd place, silver medalist(s)	Mary Adah Akor Beasley		United States	2:48:43
2018	3rd place, bronze medalist(s)	Juan Carlos Carera Casas		Mexico	2:22:22	2018	3rd place, bronze medalist(s)	Salina Jebitok Tarus		Kenya	2:50:37
