= Vancouver Marathon =

Annual race in British Columbia, Canada

- BMO Bank of Montreal Vancouver Marathon Logo
- Date: First Sunday in May
- Location: Vancouver, British Columbia, Canada
- Event type: Road Race
- Distance: Marathon
- Established: 1972
- Website: BMO Vancouver Marathon

The BMO Vancouver Marathon is an annual race held on the first Sunday of May each year in Vancouver, British Columbia. As the second largest international marathon in Canada, it has a certified running distance of 26 miles and 385 yards long. The marathon saw over 14,000 people participate on May 4, 2014, with over 3700 completing the marathon distance. This marathon is certified by the International Association of Athletics Federations & Association of International Marathons and Distance Races as a qualifying marathon race.

The race started in 1972, when a small group of 46 runners ran five loops of Stanley Park to complete the first Vancouver International Marathon (known as Lions Gate Road Runners International Marathon). The marathon grew over the next few years to 300 participants in 1977. However the event suffered a major setback in 1976 when a participant, Dr. Leslie Truelove, collapsed mid-race and died due to aneurysm. The Dr. Leslie Truelove Memorial Trophy was established to honour the first male finisher in the 50+ age category. His widow, Rosamund Dashwood, subsequently took up running and became a national champion for her age group.

The 1983 race became known as the "Long Marathon" after runners were misdirected during its running — adding an extra 561 yards to the race.

Currently, several different options are available for participants:

- Full Marathon (a Boston Marathon qualifying event) – 42 km
- Half Marathon – 21 km
- 8K – 8 km

Its current title sponsor is the BMO Bank of Montreal thus the marathon is known as BMO Vancouver Marathon. Previous title sponsor was Adidas in 2001–2005, known as the Adidas Vancouver International Marathon.

== Organization ==
The event is hosted by the Vancouver International Marathon Society (VIMS), a non-profit organization run by a volunteer Board of Directors, and managed by staff of the Society.

Each year, VIMS recruit volunteers to help with pre-race preparations and race day operation. In total, about 4000 volunteers help to run the marathon smoothly. Volunteers help in areas such as water stations, medical stations, set-up/take down, food services, given out shirts & medals to runners.

== Event details ==
A free Friendship Run organized by the Running Room is held during the race week for those who wish to participate.

=== Expo ===
The Marathon is kicked off by an Expo where runners to pick up their information packages and to receive promotional materials from various sponsors and athletic associations.

=== Race Day ===
All participants start off using a staggered time system to ensure timing accuracy. Along the race course, various safety officials are on course, including paramedics and amateur radio operators from VECTOR (Vancouver Emergency Community Telecommunications Organization).

The award ceremony are held on race day. Cash prizes will be presented to the top three male and female full and half marathon runners while merchandise will be awarded to the fastest relay team.

== Past winners – Full marathon ==
Year	Male winner			Female winner		
1972	Tom Howard	Canada	2:24:08	Patricia Loveland	United States	3:39:23
1973	Tom Howard	Canada	2:21:46	Deborah Collins	Canada	3:24:39
1974	Tom Howard	Canada	2:14:34	Maria Brzezinska	Canada	3:03:15
1975	Joe Skaja	Canada	2:22:30	Linda Winslow	United States	3:06:49
1976	Ross Jackson	New Zealand	2:22:30	Doris Brown Heritage	United States	2:47:34
1977	Chris Bolter	Canada	2:22:36	Meg Gordon	Canada	3:14:32
1978	John Hill	Canada	2:20:49	Gail McKean	Canada	2:55:33
1979	Bill Scott	Australia	2:15:56	Gail McKean	Canada	2:44:53
1980	Garry Henry	Australia	2:13:14	Marilyn Belwood	United States	2:45:27
1981	Brian Morgan	Australia	2:19:42	Nancy McLaren	Canada	2:48:23
1982	Steve Pomeroy	Canada	2:16:56	Sue Krenn	United States	2:45:25
1983	Paul Bannon	Canada	2:19:42	Beverly Bush	Canada	2:45:23
1984	Ric Sayre	United States	2:16:34	Carol Raven	New Zealand	2:52:03
1985	Adrian Wellington	Australia	2:24:24	Kikue Tejima	Japan	2:55:32
1986	Hiromi Nishi	Japan	2:21:14	Joi Belyk	Canada	2:45:37
1987	Tetsuji Iwase	Japan	2:21:12	Cathy Kroll	United States	2:46:50
1988	Mitsumasa Matsuyama	Japan	2:19:20	Isabelle Dittberner	Canada	2:50:33
1989	Shem-Tov Sabag	Israel	2:19:41	Anne Mangal	Canada	2:50:05
1990	Yoshikazu Tanese	Japan	2:23:47	Reiko Hirosawa	Japan	2:55:41
1991	Shigemi Tamori	Japan	2:25:01	Misao Miyata	Japan	2:52:14
1992	Masato Kojima	Japan	2:23:24	Yuka Terumuma	Japan	2:43:16
1993	Hayashi Morozumi	Japan	2:18:37	Eniko Feher	Hungary	2:47:27
1994	Makoto Sasaki	Japan	2:17:24	Eniko Feher	Hungary	2:46:24
1995	Graciano Gonzalez	Mexico	2:23:11	Yoko Okuda	Japan	2:48:50
1996	Juan Gonzalez	Mexico	2:17:47	Eniko Feher	Hungary	2:52:38
1997	Juan Gonzalez	Mexico	2:22:53	Eniko Feher	Hungary	2:49:56
1998	Juan Gonzalez	Mexico	2:22:48	Krystina Pieczulis	Poland	2:43:20
1999	Atsunari Saito	Japan	2:21:33	Krystina Pieczulis	Poland	2:43:46
2000	Ulrich Steidl	Germany	2:18:53	Krystina Pieczulis	Poland	2:45:32
2001	Ulrich Steidl	Germany	2:18:56	Leteyesus Berehe	Ethiopia	2:45:51
2002	Ulrich Steidl	Germany	2:17:01	Angela Strange	Canada	2:45:46
2003	Ulrich Steidl	Germany	2:20:22	Angela Strange	Canada	2:46:22
2004	Ulrich Steidl	Germany	2:18:26	Mary Akor	United States	2:44:43
2005	Kassahun Kabiso	Ethiopia	2:15:40	Rimma Dubovik	Ukraine	2:44:05
2006	Kassahun Kabiso	Ethiopia	2:18:28	Malgorzata Sobanska	Poland	2:37:06
2007	Thomas Omwenga	Kenya	2:25:27	Claudia Camargo	Argentina	2:35:50
2008	Thomas Omwenga	Kenya	2:15:59	Mary Akor	United States	2:37:54
2009	Benard Arasa Onsare	Kenya	2:28:26	Mary Akor	United States	2:46:24
2010	Thomas Omwenga	Kenya	2:16:55	Emma Muthoni Kiruki	Kenya	2:37:17
2011	Benard Arasa Onsare	Kenya	2:19:54	Keddi-Anne Sherbino	Canada	2:43:40
2012	Gezahgn Eshetu	Ethiopia	2:21:51	Ellie Greenwood	United Kingdom	2:42:16
2013	Thomas Omwenga	Kenya	2:24:09	Lucy Njeri	Kenya	2:40:34
2014	Berhanu Mekonnen	Ethiopia	2:21:08	Kimberley Doerksen	Canada	2:37:00
2015	Luka Chelimo	Kenya	2:18:37	Lioudmila Kortchaguina	Canada	2:37:37
2016	Daniel Kipkoech	Canada	2:21:04	Hirut Guangul	United States	2:39:52
2017	Daniel Kipkoech	Canada	2:19:09	Gladys Tarus	Kenya	2:39:38
2018	Rob Watson	Canada	2:27:38	Zhiling Zheng	China	2:43:50
2019	Yuki Kawauchi	Japan	2:15:01	Yuko Mizuguchi	Japan	2:41:28
2020	cancelled due to coronavirus pandemic					
2021	cancelled due to coronavirus pandemic					
2022	Chris Balestrini	Canada	2:23:56	Dayna Pidhoresky	Canada	2:34:30
2023	Yuki Kawauchi	Japan	2:17:04	Dayna Pidhoresky	Canada	2:34:25

- Note: Bold face text denotes current course record holder.

== Current World Records established at the Vancouver Marathon ==
MARATHON

- May 1, 2005 BJ (BETTY JEAN) McHUGH of North Vancouver, BC Canada established a world W77 single age Marathon record with a time of 4:11:28
- May 3, 2009 GWEN McFARLAN of Richmond, BC, Canada established a World W75 age group Marathon record for and a W75 single age world record with a time of 3:57:30

HALF MARATHON

- May 4, 1997 BJ (BETTY JEAN) McHUGH of North Vancouver, BC Canada established a world W69 single age Half Marathon record with a time of 1:41:39
- May 4, 2008 BJ (BETTY JEAN) McHUGH of North Vancouver, Canada (Single age record for Women aged 80 years old, 2:04:19 Half Marathon)
- May 2, 2010 GWEN McFARLAN of Richmond, BC, Canada established a World W76 single age Half Marathon record a world record with a time of 1:52:23
- May 2, 2010 BJ (BETTY JEAN) McHUGH of North Vancouver, BC Canada established a W82 world single age Half Marathon record with a time of 2:23:08

== Race Dates ==
The race is held on the first Sunday of May each year.

- May 2, 2010 (39th)
- May 1, 2011 (40th)
- May 6, 2012 (41st)
- May 5, 2013 (42nd)
- May 4, 2014 (43rd)
- May 3, 2015 (44th)
- May 8, 2016 (45th)
- May 7, 2017 (46th)
- May 6, 2018 (47th)
- May 5, 2019 (48th)
- Due to the COVID-19 coronavirus pandemic, the 2020 race was cancelled, while the 2021 event was virtualized.

== Controversy ==
After the 2015 Vancouver Marathon, a video surfaced regarding the lack of coordination with traffic police. Runners were stopped mid-race at intersections. The Marathon director addressed the video and as of 2016, the race no longer begins in waves. Now all runners begin once the gun goes off.

== Cancellations ==
The 2020 edition of the marathon was replaced with a virtual event due to the COVID-19 pandemic. The 2021 edition was also cancelled and replaced with virtual events.

== See also ==
- List of marathon races in North America
