= María del Carmen Cárdenas =

Mexican long-distance runner

Medal record

Women's athletics

Representing Mexico

Pan American Games
Gold medal – first place	1987 Indianapolis	Marathon

María del Carmen Cárdenas (born 13 February 1959) is a Mexican former long-distance runner who competed in the marathon.

She emerged as a road runner in 1983 when she won the inaugural edition of the Mexico City Marathon in a time of 3:05:09 hours. She subsequently gained an invite to the Los Angeles Marathon in 1984 and placed sixth, before going on to win the Cleveland Marathon in a new best of 2:41:13 hours (which proved to be a lifetime best). As a result, Cardenas earned a place on the Mexican team for the 1984 Los Angeles Olympics (alongside two other namesakes María Trujillo and María Luisa Ronquillo) and ended the race in 40th place.

After skipping the 1985 season, Cárdenas returned to the top of the Mexico City Marathon podium in 1986 with a women's course record of 2:42:25 (the second fastest of her career). The women's marathon was added to the Pan American programme and at the 1987 Pan American Games she came away with the gold medal ahead of American Debbie Warner and Cuba's Maribel Durruty. She was one of two Mexican women to take athletics gold that year, alongside walker María Colín.^{[nb]}

Her final appearances at high profile marathon competitions came in the United States in the 1988 season. She was fourth at the Long Beach Marathon, won the Sunburst Marathon in South Bend, Indiana and placed third at the San Diego Marathon.

== International competitions ==
Year	Competition	Venue	Position	Event	Notes
1984	Olympic Games	Los Angeles, United States	40th	Marathon	2:44:48
1987	Pan American Games	Indianapolis, United States	1st	Marathon	2:52:06
