= Lala Marathon =

Marathon in Mexico

- Date: early March
- Location: Gómez Palacio, Durango and Torreón, Coahuila
- Event type: Road
- Distance: Marathon
- Primary sponsor: Grupo Lala
- Established: 1989
- Course records: Men's: 2:08:17 (2011) (Kenya) Hillary Kipchirchir Kimaiyo; Women's: 2:29:00 (2019) (Mexico) Dulce María Rodríguez
- Website: Lala International Marathon

The Lala Marathon (also known as Maraton International LALA or Marathon of the Laguna, Lala) is a 26.2-mile footrace from Gómez Palacio to Torreón, Mexico, first held in 1989 and sponsored by Grupo Lala. The marathon runs through Torreón's metro area, which is known as "La Laguna," and crosses through the states of Coahuila and Durango. In 2011, Kenyan Hillary Kipchirchir Kimaiyo set a record for the fastest marathon ever run in Mexico when he ran a 2:08:17.

== Course ==
The route begins at the Laguna Industrial Park in Gómez Palacio, Durango, later enters Lerdo to return to Gómez Palacio before reaching Torreón, Coahuila, thus touring the main lagoon cities, passing through numerous important and historical places in the town such as the Puente Plateado (the Silver Bridge) over the Nazas River at the entrance of Torreón. Racers finish in the Bosque Venustiano Carranza, a large forested park in the center of the city. The race's finish line features "El Grito Triunfo," a permanent 85-foot-high arch created by local sculptor Mario Talamás Murra.

The course is known for being fast, and it has served as the Mexican Championship race for several years.

The race often draws 5,000 runners from several countries and it is a Boston Marathon qualifier.

The race was first run April 16, 1989. Now it is typically held the first Sunday of March.

Due to the COVID-19 pandemic, the 2021 race was not held, but "virtual" races were offered.

== Race Weekend ==
The weekend offers a 10K, 15K, a half marathon, and the marathon.

== Winners ==
Edition	Date	Male	Time	Female	Time
32nd	March 1, 2020	Erick Moyenye Mose	2:19:21	Madaí Pérez	2:31:54
31st	March 3, 2019	Daniel Ortiz	2:20:46	Berenice Rodriguez Varela	2:48:58
30th	March 4, 2018	Daniel Ortiz	2:26:54	María Isabel Vélez	2:49:45
29th	March 5, 2017	Daniel Ortiz Pérez	2:27:13	María Isabel Vélez	3:00:06
28th	March 6, 2016	Julius Keter	2:17:19	Ogla Jerono Kimaiyo	2:36:56
27th	March 1, 2015	Erick Monyeye Mose	2:14:38	Demissie Misiker Mekonin	2:37:28
26th	March 2, 2014	Stephen Mbure Njoroge	2:15:14	Shewarge Amare Alene	2:35:31
25th	March 3, 2013	Isaack Kemboi Kimaiyo	2:13:56	Truphena Jemeli Tarus	2:37:03
24th	March 4, 2012	Erick Monyeye Mose	2:10:40	Marisol Guadalupe Romero Rosales	2:31:15
23rd	March 6, 2011	Hillary Kipchirchir Kimaiyo	2:08:17	Paula Apollonio Juárez	2:34:34
22nd	March 7, 2010	Joseph Mutinda	2:15:35	Adriana Fernández	2:43:39
21st	March 1, 2009	Carlos Cordero	2:12:48	Dulce María Rodríguez	2:30:48
20th	March 2, 2008	Procopio Hernandez	2:12:38	Patricia Retiz	2:30:29
19th	March 4, 2007	Pablo Olmedo	2:11:34	María Elena Valencia	2:31:16
18th	March 5, 2006	Jackson Kipngok	2:14:16	María Elena Valencia	2:33:14
17th	March 6, 2005	George Okworo Onwonga	2:11:47	Dulce María Rodríguez	2:29:00
16th	March 7, 2004	Thomas Omwenga	2:11:38	Margarita Cabello	2:37:31
15th	March 2, 2003	Francis elBaptist	2:14:28	Albina Galljamowa	2:35:48
14th	March 3, 2002	Francis elBaptist	2:13:04	Nora Leticia Rocha	2:32:46
13th	March 4, 2001	Andrés Espinosa	2:10:57	Adriana Fernández	2:30:30
12th	March 5, 2000	Benjamin Paredes	2:11:24	Lucía Rendón	2:37:23
11th	April 4, 1999	Luis Reyes	2:13:42	Albina Galljamowa	2:34:38
10th	April 5, 1998	Alejandro Villanueva	2:12:30	Patricia Jardón	2:41:27
9th	April 6, 1997	Sergio Jiménez	2:14:04	Lourdes Isabel López Carmona	2:36:52
8th	April 7, 1996	Margarito Zamora	2:14:19	María Elena Reyna	2:37:01
7th	April 2, 1995	Faustino Reynoso	2:12:29	Martha Duran	2:45:16
6th	April 3, 1994	Sergio Jiménez	2:14:11	Leticia Martínez	2:41:35
5th	April 4, 1993	Benjamin Paredes	2:15:37	Empress Wilson	2:46:30
4th	April 5, 1992	Ignacio Alberto Cuba	2:17:39	Olga Appell	2:45:50
3rd	April 7, 1991	Noé Moreno Ramírez	2:19:32	Leticia Tinajero Carpio	2:57:59
2nd	April 8, 1990	Juan Samuel López	2:26:01	Penélope Loma Guerrero	3:08:19
1st	April 16, 1989	Genaro Monsiváis López	2:24:05	Penélope Loma Guerrero	2:58:17
