= Salvador García (runner) =

Mexican long-distance runner

Personal information
- Full name: Salvador García Melchor
- Nickname: Halcón
- Nationality: Mexican
- Born: 1 November 1962 (age 63)
- Height: 5 ft 8 in (173 cm)
- Weight: 140 lb (64 kg)

Sport
- Sport: Running
- Event: Marathon

Salvador García Melchor (born 1 November 1962) is a Mexican marathon runner who won the New York Marathon in 1991 in a time of 2:09:28. He also won the 1992 Rotterdam Marathon in a time of 2:09:16. Other notable wins include the 1988 Mexico City Marathon (2:19.02) and the 1991 Long Beach Marathon (2:16.08). He finished second in the 1990 New York marathon with a time of 2:13.19.

== Marathons ==
Year	Competition	Venue	Position	Notes
Representing Mexico
1988	Houston Marathon	Houston, United States	2nd	2:11:50
1988	Mexico City Marathon	Mexico City, Mexico	1st	2:19:02
1989	New Jersey Waterfront Marathon	East Rutherford, New Jersey	1st	2:10:47
1990	Long Beach Marathon	Long Beach, California	1st	2:15:21
1990	New York City Marathon	New York, United States	2nd	2:13:19
1991	Long Beach Marathon	Long Beach, California	1st	2:16:08
1991	New York City Marathon	New York, United States	1st	2:09:28
1992	Rotterdam Marathon	Rotterdam, Netherlands	1st	2:09:16
1995	Pittsburgh Marathon	Pittsburgh, Pennsylvania	8th	2:17:48
1995	New York City Marathon	New York, United States	10th	2:12:57

Source: Association of Road Racing Statisticians.
