= Doug Kurtis =

American long-distance runner

Personal information
- Nationality: American
- Born: Douglas Kurtycz; March 12, 1952 (age 74)

Sport
- Country: United States
- Sport: Athletics
- Event: Marathon

Achievements and titles
- Personal bests: 10 mile: 48:35 Half marathon: 1:05:06 Marathon: 2:13:34

Doug Kurtis (born March 12, 1952) is a retired American long-distance runner who holds the world record for number of marathon victories (40) and the number of marathons run under the time of 2:20:00 (76).

== Career ==
More than 15 of his marathon wins were large US marathons. His largest prize purse came from winning the 1993 Las Vegas Marathon, where he won $15,000. He was the winner of the 1989 Barcelona Marathon and a top-3 finisher at many international marathons, including the Montreal Marathon, Stockholm Marathon, Hong Kong Marathon, Toronto Marathon, and dozens of others. In 1984, he broke Greg Meyer's winning streak at the Amway River Bank Run.

Among his career accomplishments are his domination of the Detroit Free Press Marathon (1987–1992), his three wins at the international Bangkok Marathon (1989–1991), his two wins at Grandma's Marathon (1989, 1993), his 1994 win at the Austin Marathon, his 1988 win at the Penang Bridge International Marathon in Malaysia, his five wins at the Seattle Marathon (1985–1990), and his 1990 win of the storied Yonkers Marathon. Kurtis was also a top finisher at many world major marathons, including the 1992 Boston Marathon and the 1984 and 1989 Chicago Marathons.

As of 2013, Kurtis had run more than 200 sub-3 marathons.

Kurtis was also the former race director of the Detroit Free Press Marathon and The Detroit Turkey Trot Races. He is currently the race director for the Corktown St. Patrick Day Race in Detroit.
