= Guadalajara Marathon =

Annual race in Mexico since 1984

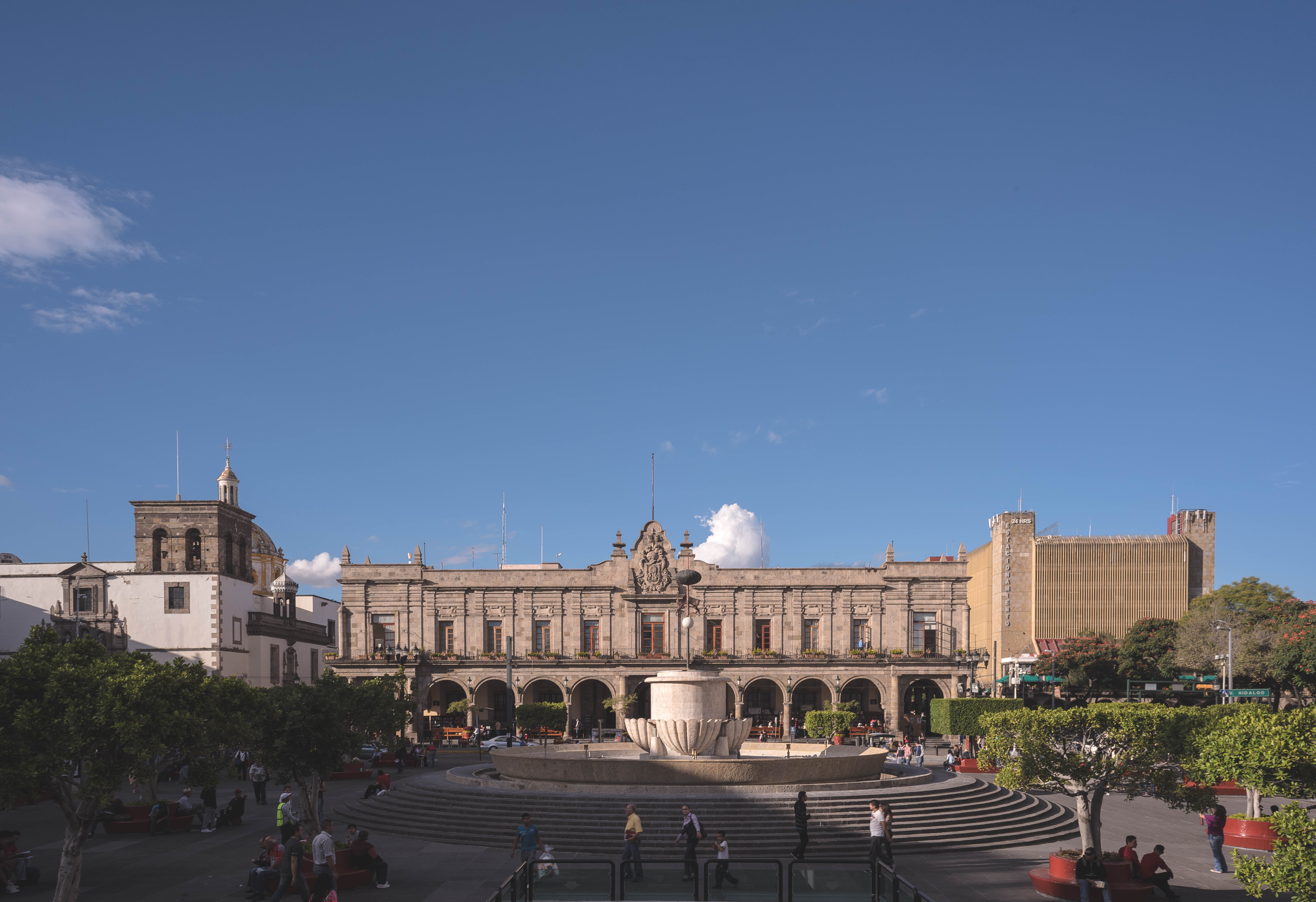
- The Palacio Municipal, at the finish area
- Date: October or November
- Location: Guadalajara, Jalisco, Mexico
- Event type: Road
- Distance: Marathon
- Established: 1984 (42 years ago) (Note: The inaugural race in 1984 was a half marathon. The second edition, in 1985, was the first to feature a race with the standard marathon distance of 42.195 km (26.2 mi).)
- Website: https://www.maratonguadalajara.org

The Guadalajara Marathon (Note: Spanish: Maratón Guadalajara) (also known as the Guadalajara International Marathon (Note: Spanish: Maratón Internacional Guadalajara) or Maratón GDL) is an annual road-based marathon hosted by Guadalajara, Mexico, since 1984. The marathon is a World Athletics Elite Label Road Race and a member of the Association of International Marathons and Distance Races.

The event is organized by the Guadalajara Municipal Sports Council, which also organizes the Guadalajara Half Marathon, a separate half marathon event held in February.

== History ==
The inaugural race was held on 26 February 1984 as a half marathon. It was won by Mexican runner Audón Hernández with a finish time of 1:06:16.

The second edition, held on 10 February 1985, was the first to feature a race with the standard marathon distance of 42.195 km (26.2 mi). The marathon was won by Mexican runners Eduardo Blake and Esmeralda Gutiérrez, with finish times of 2:22:22 and 3:00:59, respectively.

The event was not held in 2011 due to the 2011 Pan American Games being held in the city that October.

The 2020 edition of the race was cancelled due to the coronavirus pandemic.

== Course ==
External image
- Course map of full marathon in 2022

The marathon begins at the Hospicio Cabañas and ends at the Palacio Municipal. The course consists of roughly a clockwise loop in the central and southern areas of the city, with an additional out-and-back leg along Lázaro Cárdenas Avenue making up about a third of the course.
