= North American 5K Championships =

Annual road running competition

The North American 5K Championships, also known as the North American 5 km Team Challenge, was an annual road running competition over 5 kilometres between three North American countries: Canada, Mexico and the United States.

The event was created in 2002 and held as part of the Arturo Barrios Invitational races each October in Chula Vista, California. It would be the permanent host of the competition, until the final edition in 2005. The competition had three elements: a men's 5K run, a women's 5K run, and a team competition. The team scores were decided by combining the finishing places of the top two men and top two women for each nation. The lowest overall score was the team winner. A total of three athletes could be entered per nation in each race.

All three participating nations won a team title over the competition's four-edition history, with Mexico winning the first, the United States the second, and Canada the final two titles. Mexico was the most successful in the men's race, having three wins, and Alejandro Suárez was the most successful male athlete with his back-to-back wins in 2003 and 2004. Canada was the most successful in the women's race, courtesy of Émilie Mondor's three straight wins from 2003 to 2005 and a runner-up place in 2002. The United States failed to win an individual title, despite being the host nation. Mondor set the women's championship record of 15:16 minutes in 2004 (also a Canadian national record), while Mexico's David Galván inaugural winning time of 13:47 minutes was never bettered.

== Editions ==
Edition	Year	Host city	Host country	Date	No. of athletes
1st	2002	Chula Vista, California	United States	27 October	18
2nd	2003	Chula Vista, California	United States	26 October	18
3rd	2004	Chula Vista, California	United States	24 October	18
4th	2005	Chula Vista, California	United States	23 October	17^{[nb]}

- ^{nb} American Lauren Fleshman was entered in the women's race, but was a non-starter.

== Medallists ==
=== Men's individual ===
Year	Gold		Silver		Bronze	
2002	David Galván (MEX)	13:47 CR	Bolota Asmerom (USA)	13:54	Kevin Sullivan (CAN)	14:00
2003	Alejandro Suárez (MEX)	14:01	Pablo Olmedo (MEX)	14:03	Ahman Dirks (USA)	14:05
2004	Alejandro Suárez (MEX)	13:56	Rafael Sánchez (MEX)	13:59	Reid Coolsaet (CAN)	14:03
2005	Paul Morrison (CAN)	13:58	Juan Luis Barrios (MEX)	14:08	Reid Coolsaet (CAN)	14:10

=== Women's individual ===
Year	Gold		Silver		Bronze	
2002	Dulce María Rodríguez (MEX)	15:30	Émilie Mondor (CAN)	15:32	Adriana Fernández (MEX)	15:36
2003	Émilie Mondor (CAN)	15:23	Elva Dryer (USA)	15:43	Sylvia Mosqueda (USA)	15:54
2004	Émilie Mondor (CAN)	15:16 CR	Malindi Elmore (CAN)	16:00	Collette Liss (USA)	16:03
2005	Émilie Mondor (CAN)	15:37	Amy Yoder Begley (USA)	16:04	Tara Quinn-Smith (CAN)	16:07

=== Team ===
Year	Gold		Silver		Bronze	
2002	Mexico; David Galván; Julio Valle; Dulce María Rodríguez; Adriana Fernández	10	United States; Bolota Asmerom; Clint Wells; Sylvia Mosqueda; Libbie Hickman	16	Canada; Kevin Sullivan; Jeremy Deere; Émilie Mondor; Lucy Smith	21
2003	United States; Ahman Dirks; Pete Julian; Elva Dryer; Sylvia Mosqueda	13	Canada; Bruno Mazzotta; Joël Bourgeois; Émilie Mondor; Leah Pells	15	Mexico; Alejandro Suárez; Pablo Olmedo; Estela Chavez; Esly Quijano	17
2004	Canada; Reid Coolsaet; Ryan McKenzie; Émilie Mondor; Malindi Elmore	12	Mexico; Alejandro Suárez; Rafael Sánchez; Angelica Sánchez; Elisa Cuellar	16	United States; Jonathon Riley; Chad Johnson; Collette Liss; Amy Mortimer	19
2005	Canada; Paul Morrison; Reid Coolsaet; Émilie Mondor; Tara Quinn Smith	8	United States; Pete Julian; Ian Connor; Amy Yoder Begley; Amy Mortimer	16	Mexico; Juan Luis Barrios; Teodoro Vega; America Mateos; Gisel Bautista	20
