= Arcos de Guadalajara =

Monument in Guadalajara, Jalisco, Mexico

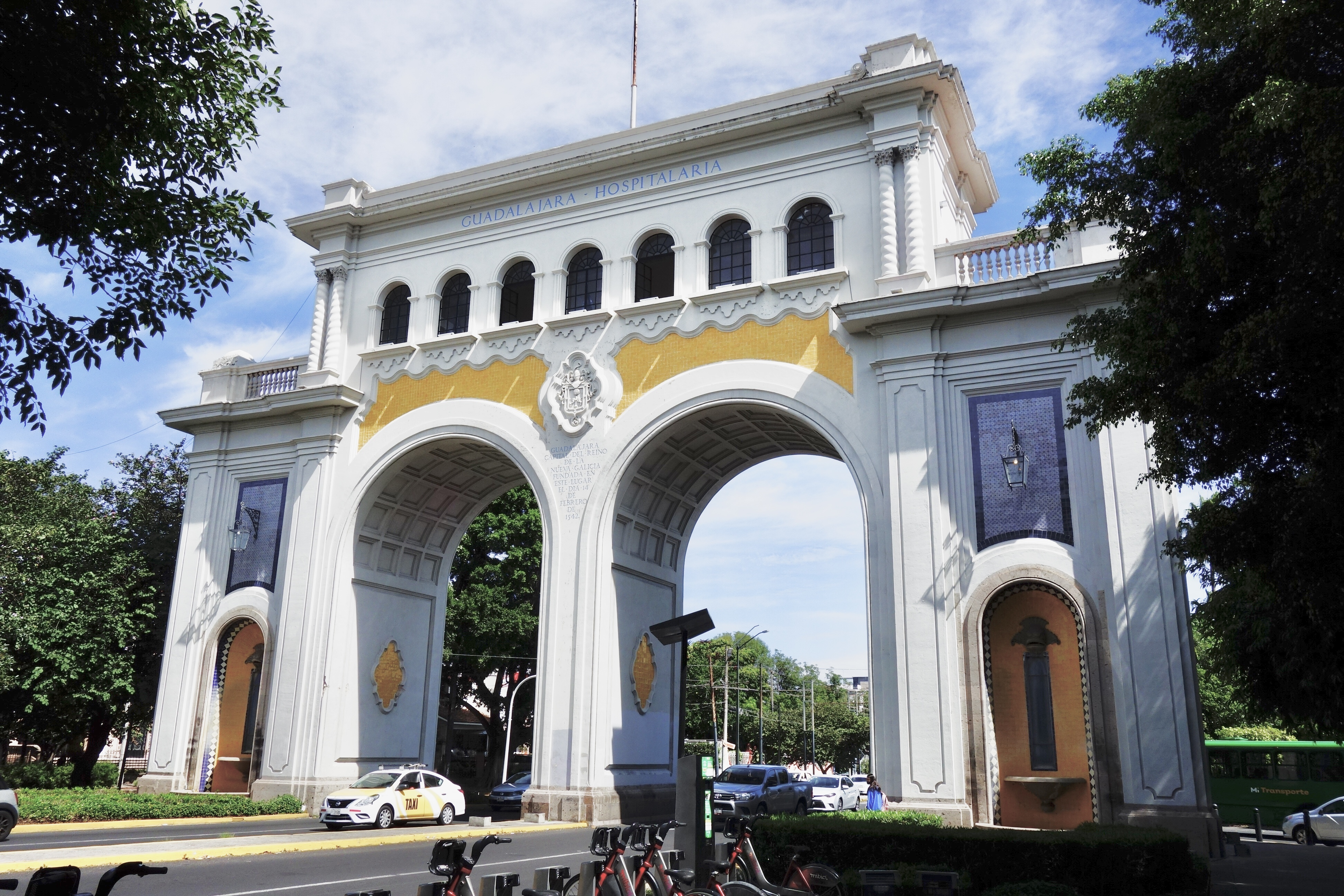
- The monument in 2021
- Interactive map of Arcos de Guadalajara
- Location: Guadalajara, Jalisco, Mexico
- Coordinates: 20°40′28″N 103°23′5.5″W

Arcos de Guadalajara (1939-1959) is a monument in Guadalajara, in the Mexican state of Jalisco.

== History ==
Since a population boom in the 1930's, Guadalajara has become home to many architectural and cultural institutions making this a popular tourist attraction. Railroads and highway networks connect from Jalisco to other population centers. Inspired by the Arc de Triomphe and its neoclassical style, Governor Silvano Barba commissioned architect Aurelio Aceves to design and construct Jalisco's own arches to commemorate the 400th anniversary of the creation of the city.

=== Architecture of Mexico ===
Cities in Mexico used France and Italy to influence their new republic. Many new buildings were built in Beaux-Arts Neoclassical style in a grid system. Mexico architects searched for a national identity and created a colonial architecture based on their pre-Columbian heritage. Integration of art and architecture took form in Mexico's period of diverse experimentation and structural innovation.

== Structure ==
Inscription of "Guadalajara Hospitalaria" and Hall of Flags

Aurelio Aceves designed the two arches to be decorated in handmade tiles and had the coat of arms engraved in each of the arches. These arches stand eight meters wide and 14 meters high with the inscription "Guadalaraja Hospitalaria". A second sub substructure rests on top of the arches called the Hall of Flags that serves as a viewpoint to the center of Norte Vallarta.
