= Detroit Free Press Marathon =

Annual marathon

- Date: 3rd Sunday in October
- Location: Detroit, Michigan, United States and Windsor, Ontario, Canada
- Event type: road
- Distance: Marathon, Half-Marathon, Marathon Relay, 5K, 1-mile, Kids Marathon, Kids Run
- Established: 1978
- Course records: Male: 2:12:11 (Andy Bowman, 2026); Female: 2:34:16 (Yelena Orlova, 2004)
- Website: www.freepmarathon.com

The Detroit Free Press Marathon is a 42.195-kilometre (26.219 mi) race run every third Sunday in October in Detroit, Michigan, United States, and Windsor, Ontario, Canada, since 1978. The marathon course is international and has featured the Detroit–Windsor Tunnel for all but two years of its existence. The current course crosses the Ambassador Bridge and the Detroit–Windsor Tunnel between Detroit and Windsor. Due to its use of the tunnel, the race is able to boast that it has the only official underwater international mile in the world, as the tunnel runs underneath the Detroit River. The race is a USATF-certified, Boston-qualifier course.

The race weekend also features an international half-marathon, a U.S.-Only half-marathon, a relay, a 5K, a 1-mile, a Kids Marathon and a Kids fun run.

== History ==
The predecessor to this race was the Motor City Marathon which started in 1963 and featured multiple laps on Belle Isle. Until 1968, the race was held on Thanksgiving Day.

The first international marathon was organized by former Detroit Free Press editor and publisher Neal Shine, who was inspired to produce a race in Detroit after witnessing the Falmouth Road Race in Boston during a family vacation.

From 1978 to 1998 the race started in Windsor and finished in Detroit. The race has had several other sponsors, changing the name slightly each time.

2009's field was a record 19,326 runners who participated.

The 2020 in-person edition of the race was canceled due to the coronavirus pandemic. Registrants were given the option of running the race on their own courses, transferring their entry to 2021 or 2022, or obtaining a 50 percent refund.

The male and female winners of the 2024 race, Andy Bowman and Sydney Devore, were also a married couple.

The race sold out for the first time in 2024. Both the half marathon and marathons had reached capacity by July, about three months before the event. In 2025, the race sold out even more quickly. It reached capacity by early March.

In 2026, Andy Bowman set a new male course record of 2:12:11, beating the previous record of 2:13:07 set by Greg Meyer in 1980. This was also Bowman's third consecutive win of the men's race.

== Winners ==
| Date | Time | Men's winner | Time | Women's winner |
|---|---|---|---|---|
| 1978 | 2:17:37 | Robert McOmber (USA) | 2:55:51 | Erma Tranter (USA) |
| 1979 | 2:15:42 | Gordon Minty (GBR) | 2:44:29 | Karen Blackford (USA) |
| 1980 | 2:13:07 | Greg Meyer (USA) | 2:49:17 | Debbie Froehlich (USA) |
| 1981 | 2:15:47 | Mike McGuire (USA) | 2:48:40 | Maureen Griffiths (CAN) |
| 1982 | 2:17:41 | David Hinz (USA) | 2:45:05 | Karen Blackford (USA) |
| 1983 | 2:16:10 | David Olds (USA) | 2:46:22 | Cindy Keeler (USA) |
| 1984 | 2:23:40 | Loren Bandt (USA) | 2:43:00 | Karen Blackford (USA) |
| 1985 | 2:23:58 | Tim Fox (USA) | 2:51:49 | Elizabeth Watch (USA) |
| 1986 | 2:17:24 | Ahmed Mohamed Ismail (SOM) | 2:47:56 | Pat Wassik-Hinson (USA) |
| 1987 | 2:18:03 | Doug Kurtis (USA) | 2:47:25 | Christine Iwahashi (USA) |
| 1988 | 2:20:14 | Doug Kurtis (USA) | 2:41:49 | Ella Willis (USA) |
| 1989 | 2:17:24 | Doug Kurtis (USA) | 2:38:22 | Ella Willis (USA) |
| 1990 | 2:19:36 | Doug Kurtis (USA) | 2:44:56 | Barbara Remmers (USA) |
| 1991 | 2:18:36 | Doug Kurtis (USA) | 2:42:49 | Ella Willis (USA) |
| 1992 | 2:19:25 | Doug Kurtis (USA) | 2:45:21 | Karen Blackford (USA) |
| 1993 | 2:19:53 | Peter Maher (CAN) | 2:43:07 | Amy Manson (USA) |
| 1994 | 2:21:24 | Donald Johns (USA) | 2:34:55 | May Allison (CAN) |
| 1995 | 2:18:11 | Michael McGowan (CAN) | 2:38:36 | Ann Boyd (USA) |
| 1996 | 2:20:50 | Michael Dudley (USA) | 2:43:36 | Cindy Keeler (USA) |
| 1997 | 2:15:50 | Brad Hudson (USA) | 2:39:59 | Lyubov Klochko (UKR) |
| 1998 | 2:18:51 | Zithulele Sinqe (RSA) | 2:45:06 | Tatyana Maslova (RUS) |
| 1999 | 2:18:27 | Fred Kieser (USA) | 2:43:58 | Irina Khramova (RUS) |
| 2000 | 2:24:47 | Joseph Maina (KEN) | 2:54:30 | Lisa Veneziano (USA) |
| 2001 | 2:17:49 | Jacom Kirwa (KEN) | 2:52:16 | Lupe Hegan (USA) |
| 2002 | 2:19:14 | John Kariuki (KEN) | 2:43:22 | Angela Strange (CAN) |
| 2003 | 2:19:27 | Hilary Lelei (KEN) | 2:46:59 | Elvira Kolpakova (RUS) |
| 2004 | 2:19:15 | Joseph Ndirtu (KEN) | 2:34:16 | Yelena Sidorchenkova Orlova (RUS) |
| 2005 | 2:14:59 | Andrey Gordayev (BLR) | 2:40:46 | Wioletta Kryza (POL) |
| 2006 | 2:18:22 | Josephat Ongeri (KEN) | 2:41:26 | Yelena Sidorchenkova Orlova (RUS) |
| 2007 | 2:15:15 | Christopher Toroitich (KEN) | 2:34:50 | Anzhelika Averkova (UKR) |
| 2008 | 2:16:44 | David Ngeny Cheruiyot (KEN) | 2:40:17 | Tatyana Belovol (UKR) |
| 2009 | 2:20:24 | Nicholas Stanko (USA) | 2:57:10 | Sarah Plaxton (USA) |
| 2010 | 2:28:30 | Jordan Desilets (USA) | 2:52:14 | Paula Keating (CAN) |
| 2011 | 2:28:22 | Derek Nakluski (CAN) | 2:44:09 | Wioletta Kryza (POL) |
| 2012 | 2:25:26 | Vyacheslav Shabunin (RUS) | 2:46:33 | Lyubov Denisova (RUS) |
| 2013 | 2:20:11 | Zachary Ornelas (USA) | 2:44:53 | Lyubov Denisova (RUS) |
| 2014 | 2:24:54 | Michael Andersen (USA) | 2:45:52 | Courtney Brewis (USA) |
| 2015 | 2:20:21 | Zachary Ornelas (USA) | 2:41:35 | Lyubov Denisova (RUS) |
| 2016 | 2:19:20 | Alan Peterson (USA) | 2:43:54 | Lyudmila Korchagina (CAN) |
| 2017 | 2:22:53 | Johnathan Mott (USA) | 2:49:53 | Valentyna Poltavska (UKR) |
| 2018 | 2:20:59 | Christopher Chipsiya (KEN) | 2:47:24 | Lyudmila Korchagina (CAN) |
| 2019 | 2:18:59 | Christopher Chipsiya (KEN) | 2:39:20 | Joan Massah (KEN) |
| 2020 | cancelled due to coronavirus pandemic | | | |
| 2021 | 2:22:03 | Ryan Corby (USA) | 2:51:08 | Becca Addison (USA) |
| 2022 | 2:24:28 | Ryan Corby (USA) | 2:42:25 | Mary Akor Beasley (USA) |
| 2023 | 2:22:52 | Mitch Klingler (USA) | 2:50:06 | Kate Landau (USA) |
| 2024 | 2:17:47 | Andy Bowman (USA) | 2:42:46 | Sydney Devore (USA) |
| 2025 | 2:16:10 | Andy Bowman (USA) | 2:46:59 | Christina Welsh (USA) |
| 2026 | 2:12:11 | Andy Bowman (USA) | 2:43:30 | Allison Sherman (USA) |
