= Patricia Jardón =

Mexican footballer (born 1996)

Personal information
- Full name: Patricia De María Jardón Díaz
- Date of birth: 9 November 1996 (age 29)
- Place of birth: Miguel Hidalgo, Mexico City, Mexico
- Height: 1.54 m (5 ft 1 in)
- Position: Winger

Senior career*
Years	Team	Apps	(Gls)
2017–2021	UNAM	58	(7)
2021–2023	Toluca	81	(5)
2024–2025	Tijuana	6	(0)
- * Club domestic league appearances and goals as of 4 June 2023 ‡ National team caps and goals as of 12 March 2022

Patricia De María Jardón Díaz (born 9 November 1996) is a Mexican professional footballer who plays as a Winger for Liga MX Femenil side Tijuana.

In 2017, she started her career in UNAM. In 2021, she was transferred to Toluca. Since 2023, she is part of Tijuana.
