= Sunburst Marathon =

Annual Marathon

- Date: First Saturday of June
- Location: South Bend, Indiana
- Event type: Road
- Distance: Half Marathon, 10k, 5k, 5k Fitness Walk
- Established: 1984
- Course records: Men: 2:23:31 (1987); Robert Schlau; Women: 2:47:05 (1988); Maria del Carmen Cardenas
- Website: sunburstraces.org

Sunburst Races is a half marathon, 10k, 5k event located in South Bend, Indiana held on the first Saturday in June. Originally, it also included a marathon, until 2019. Due to the COVID-19 pandemic, the race was cancelled in 2020 and then moved to September in 2021. 2020 marked the first time the event had been cancelled since its inception in 1984. The races start in Downtown South Bend and previously finished at the University of Notre Dame. In 2023, the finish line of the race was changed to Century Center to allow for more post race festivities. The race is owned and managed by Beacon Health System and supports the Beacon Children's Hospital.

== List of winners of the Sunburst Marathon ==
=== Men's ===
Year	Winner	Country	Time	Notes
1984	Mike Haag	United States	2:35:55	Course record
1985	Juan Zetina	Mexico	2:26:30	Course record
1986	Sendot Mendez	Puerto Rico	2:24:12	Course record
1987	Robert Schlau	United States	2:23:31	Course record
1988	Mark Helgson	United States	2:25:22	
1989	Raymond Ross	United States	2:31:29	
1990	Rick Mulvey	United States	2:26:03	
1991	Robert Yara	United States	2:23:51	
1992	Robert Yara	United States	2:26:50	Second Victory
1993	David Mullan	United States	2:25:11	
1994	Bob Stolz	United States	2:27:00	
1995	No Marathon Contested			
1996	Doug Curtis	United States	2:39:53	
1997	Roger Scott	United States	2:33:16	
1998	Henno Haava	Estonia	2:24:06	
1999	Henno Haava	Estonia	2:28:40	Second Victory
2000	Reta Feyissa	Ethiopia	2:27:30	
2001	Simon Cherokony	Kenya	2:24:05	
2002	Steve Wilson	United States	2:31:54	
2003	Chris Karas	United States	2:33:57	
2004	Mike Aldrink	United States	2:38:39	
2005	Rob Hruskovich	United States	2:39:28	
2006	Justin Gillette	United States	2:30:33	
2007	Chad Ware	United States	2:34:34	
2008	Justin Gillette	United States	2:30:33	Second Victory
2009	Justin Baum	United States	2:34:07	
2010	Luke Diehl	United States	2:48:45	
2011	Ryan Greutman	United States	2:37:00	
2012	Justin Gillette	United States	2:30:09	Third Victory
2013	Scott Breeden	United States	2:36:49	
2014	Jason Parks	United States	2:35:51	
2015	Matt Hoyes	United States	2:43:29	
2016	Nathan Ellis	United States	2:38:40	
2017	Andy Williams	United States	2:30:00	

=== Women's ===
Year	Winner	Country	Time	Notes
1984	Diane Kuhlman	United States	3:16:37	Course record
1985	Betty Hite-Nelson	United States	2:58:50	Course record
1986	Betty Hite-Nelson	United States	3:08:17	
1987	Chantal Maury-Best	United States	2:59:42	
1988	Maria del Carmen Cardenas	Mexico	2:47:05	Course record
1989	Cindy Barber-Keeler	United States	2:53:28	
1990	Cindy Barber-Keeler	United States	2:53:45	
1991	Bridget Collins	United States	2:47:47	
1992	Bridget Collins	United States	2:54:36	Second Victory
1993	Bridget Collins	United States	2:54:18	Third Victory
1994	Kellie Zimmerman	United States	3:00:43	
1995	No Marathon Contested			
1996	Marybeth Dillon	United States	3:11:38	
1997	Kathy Cheeseman	United States	3:01:12	
1998	Bridget Collins	United States	2:52:59	Fourth Victory
1999	Linda Grossman	United States	2:57:05	
2000	Patricia Bagley	United States	3:05:42	
2001	Renee Mangette	United States	3:00:00	
2002	Renee Damstra	United States	2:59:24	
2003	Amanda Kirby	United States	3:03:07	
2004	Nancy Schubring	United States	3:12:38	
2005	Tamara Whitten	United States	3:27:02	
2006	Shannan Rieder	United States	3:06:36	
2007	Shannan Rieder	United States	3:18:23	
2008	Tracy Wollschlager	United States	3:06:41	
2009	Sarah Plaxton	United States	2:56:45	
2010	Corey Randell	United States	3:04:58	
2011	Sarah Kasabian	United States	3:09:22	
2012	Melissa Gillette	United States	3:03:40	
2013	Becky Boyle	United States	2:55:16	
2014	Kristen Dietz	United States	3:17:58	
2015	Sarah Oren	United States	3:30:53	
2016	Elaine Schmeltz	United States	3:06:42	
2017	Emily Wagoner	United States	3:19:43	

== See also ==
- List of marathon races in North America
