= Shewarge Amare Alene =

Ethiopian long distance runner (1994–2025)

Personal information
- Born: 9 December 1994
- Died: 23 September 2025 (aged 30) Addis Ababa, Ethiopia

Sport
- Country: Ethiopia
- Sport: Marathon

Shewarge Amare Alene (9 December 1994 – 23 September 2025) was an Ethiopian marathon runner.

By 2010, she lived in New York City. There, she gained attention for winning and setting a course record in the uphill Mount Washington Road Race. She later resided in Mexico.

Her highest placement in Gold Label marathons was 10th in the 2017 Hong Kong Marathon. She competed without finishing in the 2011 New York City Marathon. Marathon wins during her career include the 2012, 2014 and 2015 Mexico City Marathons, the 2014 Lala Marathon, the 2017 Mérida Marathon, the 2018 Bangkok Marathon, the 2018 Waco Marathon, 2019 marathons in Ciudad Juárez, Huancayo, and Santiago de los Caballeros and the 2023 Izmir Marathon. Her last race was the 2025 Stockholm Marathon, on 31 May, which she also won. She died on 23 September 2025, at the age of 30, having been hospitalised in Addis Ababa whilst attending a training camp.

Her personal best times were 1:07:43 hours in the half marathon, achieved in May 2022 in Konya; and 2:27:26 hours in the marathon, achieved in October 2023 in the Cape Town Marathon.
