= Irish in Milwaukee =

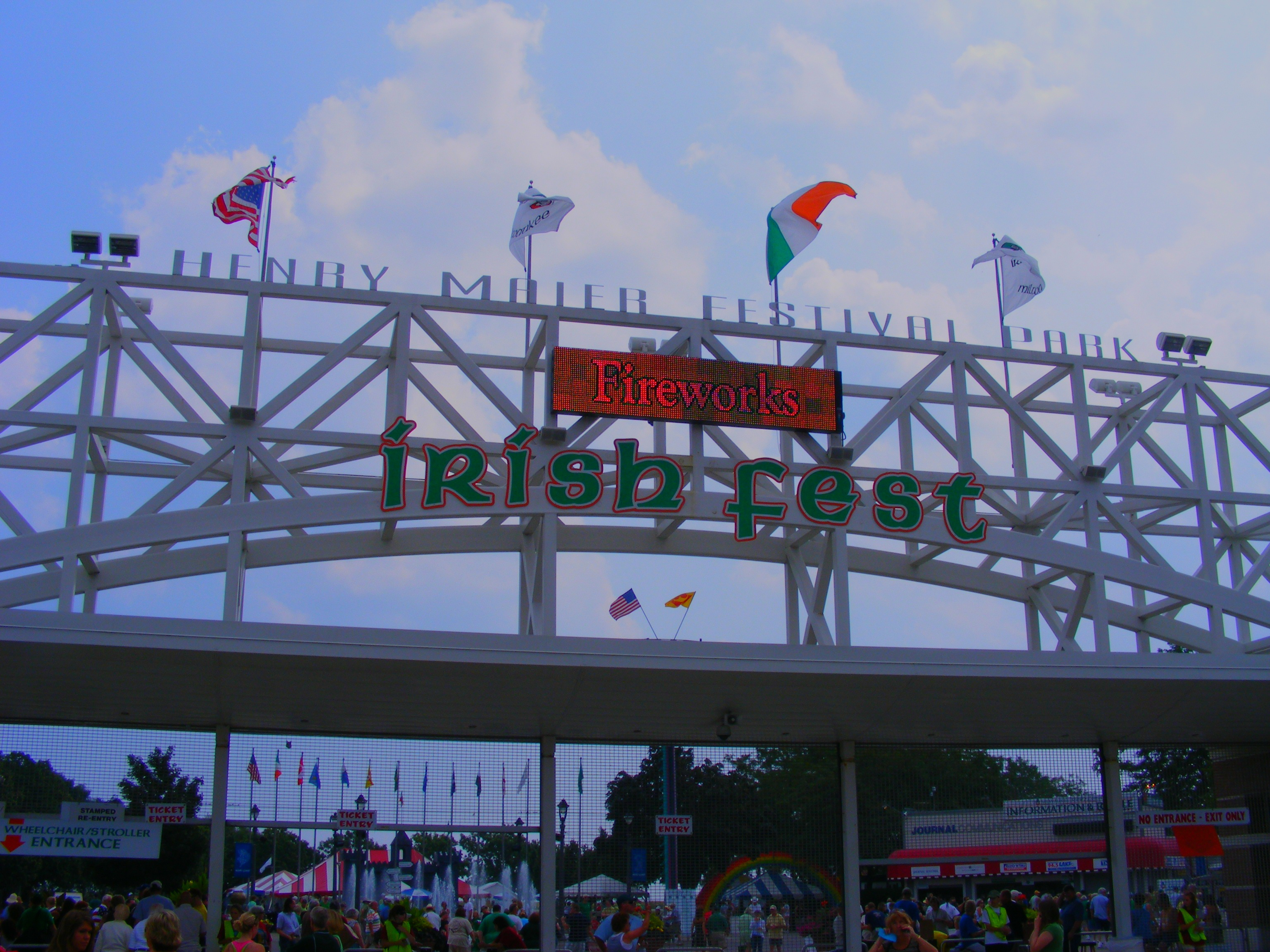
Milwaukee Irish Fest in 2009

Milwaukee has a decent sized Irish-American population.

== History ==
Following the Irish Famine of 1845–1849, over 2.1 million people left Ireland, many of whom sailed overseas to America, including to port cities on the Great Lakes. Thought not as popular a destination as Chicago or Cleveland, many Irish people found their way to Milwaukee.

== Festivals and institutions ==
Every third weekend in August, Milwaukee Irish Fest is held on the Henry Maier Festival Park.

The Irish Cultural and Heritage Center of Wisconsin serves the Greater Milwaukee area in preserving Irish heritage and traditions as well as hosting various performing artists throughout the year.

Miltown Gaels represents Milwaukee at the national level in Gaelic games.

== Notable people ==
- Rachel Brosnahan
- George F. Kennan
- Spencer Tracy
