= Sammy Malakwen =

Kenyan track and field athlete

Sammy Malakwen (also known as Samuel Malakwen; born 25 May 1978) is a middle- and long-distance runner from Kenya who also trained in Two Harbors, Minnesota. He has won several major marathons, and has finished in the top 10 of several major road races.

== Early career ==
In his early 20s, Malakwen competed in Kenyan cross country runs and European road races. At the Nairobi Cross Country Championships in 2003, he finished fourth on the heels of Ben Kimondiu and just before experienced racer Samuel Kimaiyo.

In Great Britain, Malakwen finished fourth in the Entenmann's Great Manchester 10K Run in England, won by Paul Tergat. Malakwen's time was 28:59, one second behind Aron Rono. Then he ran the 2004 British Half Marathon Championships in Ackworth, Britain. He led the pack won the race in 1:04:49, beating Simon Tonui. Before leaving England, he finished fifth at the Bath Half Marathon, second at the Great Bristol Half Marathon during a windy day (ahead of Dave Buzza), and third at the Windsor Half Marathon.

Malakwen took time off between 2004 and 2007. By then, he had moved to Two Harbors, Minnesota, to work on training. He was invited to Grandma's Marathon, which runs from Two Harbors to Duluth, Minnesota. But due to financial complications, he took out a loan with high interest to pay for the journey to a race he felt certain he could win. But his flights were delayed, and he barely made it to the starting line on the day of the race. With his lack of sleep and a rising temperature on the North Shore, Malakwen nearly dropped out and ran for a lackluster 32nd place. Fellow Kenyan and 2005 winner Wesley Ngetich won the race and took home the prize money. Malakwen finished with signs of heat stroke. He was whisked away to the hospital, where his clothes were cut off in haste to get intravenous fluids in his body. Ngetich visited him in the medical facility and left a gift of a lime-green singlet and a pair of shorts. When Malakwen was released, the two were roommates for a time before Ngetich left for Kenya again.

Without money to pay back his debt, Malakwen was in dire straights. He was staying with a host family for several months though, and as he became involved with a Two Harbors Covenant Church, members sought to help him with the financial impasse. They raised more than $3,000 and he made arrears.

The benevolence from the community would be remembered. Malakwen would be back almost every year. Starting in 2007, he lived in Two Harbors seasonally, and called Grandma's one of his favorite races in the United States.

In Kenya though, the 2007–2008 Kenyan crisis prompted by post-election political unrest threw parts the nation into chaos and violence. The fighting kept Malakwen from traveling to his next marathon (in Malaysia). But even worse, in early 2008, Malakwen's former roommate Ngetich was shot with a poisoned arrow and killed.

== Professional career ==
Malakwen worked hard to leave for the United States again, arriving back in Minnesota by spring 2008. There, he started making a name for himself on the competitive road racing circuit. In April, he won $1,000 by running a 30:51 10K run at Minneapolis' 30th annual Get in Gear. The raced opened doors for him. He scorched the 3,500 finishers of the North Dakota Fargo Half Marathon to win in 64:40.

June 2008 marked his return to Grandma's Marathon, though he was dealing with nagging injuries. Ngetich's death was widely reported; the race organizers didn't give a "No. 1" bib to any of the runners in honor of the past winner. And local news outlets marked that Malakwen was wearing Ngetich's running clothes in honor of his deceased friend. He finished 16th.

In 2009, he defended his title at the Get in Gear 10K, finishing in front of 4,000 others in 29:17 for $1,200. Two weeks later, he was back in the Fargodome, the location of the start and finish line for the Fargo Marathon. But as the spring melted heavy snowfalls, the Red River of the North rose to high levels and flooded areas of the route, which included both Fargo and Moorhead, Minnesota. The route was changed, and the marathon became a two-loop course. Malakwen finished second. But he was back in his stride when he traveled to Saylorville Reservoir on the Des Moines River for the 30th Dam to Dam 20K. In mid-60 degree weather, Belainesh Gebre ran a woman's course record and Malakwen beat almost 7,000 runners to win in the sixth-fastest time ever. He ran Grandma's Marathon again that summer, finishing 12th on an unusually hot day.

In 2010, Malakwen was off to Wisconsin and the Green Bay Marathon. He dueled with the 2009 Atlanta Marathon winner James Boit, who would win and set a new course record. Malakwen was 10 seconds behind him and placed second in 2:15:25. The following week, he became a repeat winner at the Fargo Half Marathon on a rainy day with a time of 1:04:27. In June, at his third Grandma's Marathon race, he didn't show progression—he finished 24th. He ran several other races in 2010, and in 2011, was health and running well. His races included a personal record 5K (14:10) in Cutlerville, Michigan for the win at the Brian Diemer Amerikam 5K.

He returned for a fourth time to Grandma's Marathon, hoping for better results. Facing other elite runners such as Jeffrey Eggleston, Matt Gabrielson, Christopher Kipyego, and Teklu Deneke, Malakwen paced the lead pack in the cooler morning. As the miles ticked down, he stayed with Kipyego and Deneke, and held on to finish third in 2:12:38. He took home $6,500.

The top placing and fast time prepped him well for the 30th annual October Twin Cities Marathon held between Minneapolis and St. Paul, Minnesota. Facing 8,500 other runners including Guor Marial and several fast countrymen, Malakwen took the lead and held it, despite severe cramping in his legs as he crossed over Lake Nokomis and headed toward Minnehaha Falls. He stayed with a group as they crossed the Mississippi River on the Franklin Avenue bridge, but at mile 25, he built a 10-second lead on Joseph Mutinda and kept it until crossing the finish line first near the Minnesota State Capitol in 2:13:11. It was his biggest prize purse yet: $15,000.

After the success, he flew to Lebanon for the IAAF Bronze-Labeled BLOM Beirut Marathon where he lined up with thousands in an international crowd. As the breeze blew in off the Zaituna Bay, he sprinted from the start and locked into 5-minute miles around the coast of the Mediterranean Sea and along the Beirut River. After ditching Solomon Molla and James Rotich, Malakwen kept on the heels of Ethiopian Tariku Jufar as they turned to the finish near the Martyr's Square in Downtown Beirut. Jufar set a course record with his first-place finish. Malakwen won second place in personal record time of 2:11:31.

He would be back in 2013, the year in which he finished third in 2:14:47.

The years of 2012 and 2014 were monumental years for Malakwen in Florida. In the state's biggest race, the Miami Marathon, Malakwen ran in the heat from the party atmosphere around the start at American Airlines Arena through South Beach, down Coconut Grove and across the large bridges stretched across the bay to Bayfront Park. He outperformed the international field both years to become the first-ever repeat race winner.

In 2014, he raced and won the Quad Cities Marathon in Moline, Illinois. It winds through parts of Bettendorf and Davenport, Iowa, and Moline and Rock Island, Illinois.

In 2015, he was second at the Milwaukee Marathon.

In April 2016, he was named a favorite at the 2016 River Bank Run in Grand Rapids, Michigan along with Jared Ward, Christo Landry and Fernando Cabado.

Malakwen was running along the Red River of the North again in 2016, this time in the full marathon. He had won the half marathon in 2008 and 2010, setting a course record of 1:04:27. He took the Fargo Marathon by storm, winning by more than five minutes and netting a healthy cash prize.

In September 2015, Malakwen dueled with several other international competitors to defend his title at Quad Cities. The race came down to the last stretch, where Kennedy Kemei ran past him. Malakwen won second and $2,000.

In the 2016 Quad Cities Marathon, one of his last races, Malakwen was disqualified. The race director said that the lead pack of Kenyans and Ethiopians seemed to be running together as they approached Rock Island, but when they emerged from Arsenal Island (which is an active military base and does not allow spectators), Malakwen, Stanley Boen and Werkuneh Seyoum Aboye came out minutes ahead of the others. The director determined that they either cut the course accidentally or they took a wrong turn, so he pulled them from the course. Ethiopian Genna Tufa would win the race, but in the half marathon, winner Brandon Mull ran farther than 13.1 miles when he took a wrong turn at a badly marked intersection and ran for a while with the marathoners.

== Personal life ==
Malakwen lived in Kaptagat, Kenya, on a farm with his parents and his two sisters. He is 5'10' and 135 lb. He trained in Eldoret, Kenya, with a training group that included Sammy Rotich. He married and had three children.
