= Milwaukee Irish Fest =

Irish-American festival in Milwaukee, Wisconsin

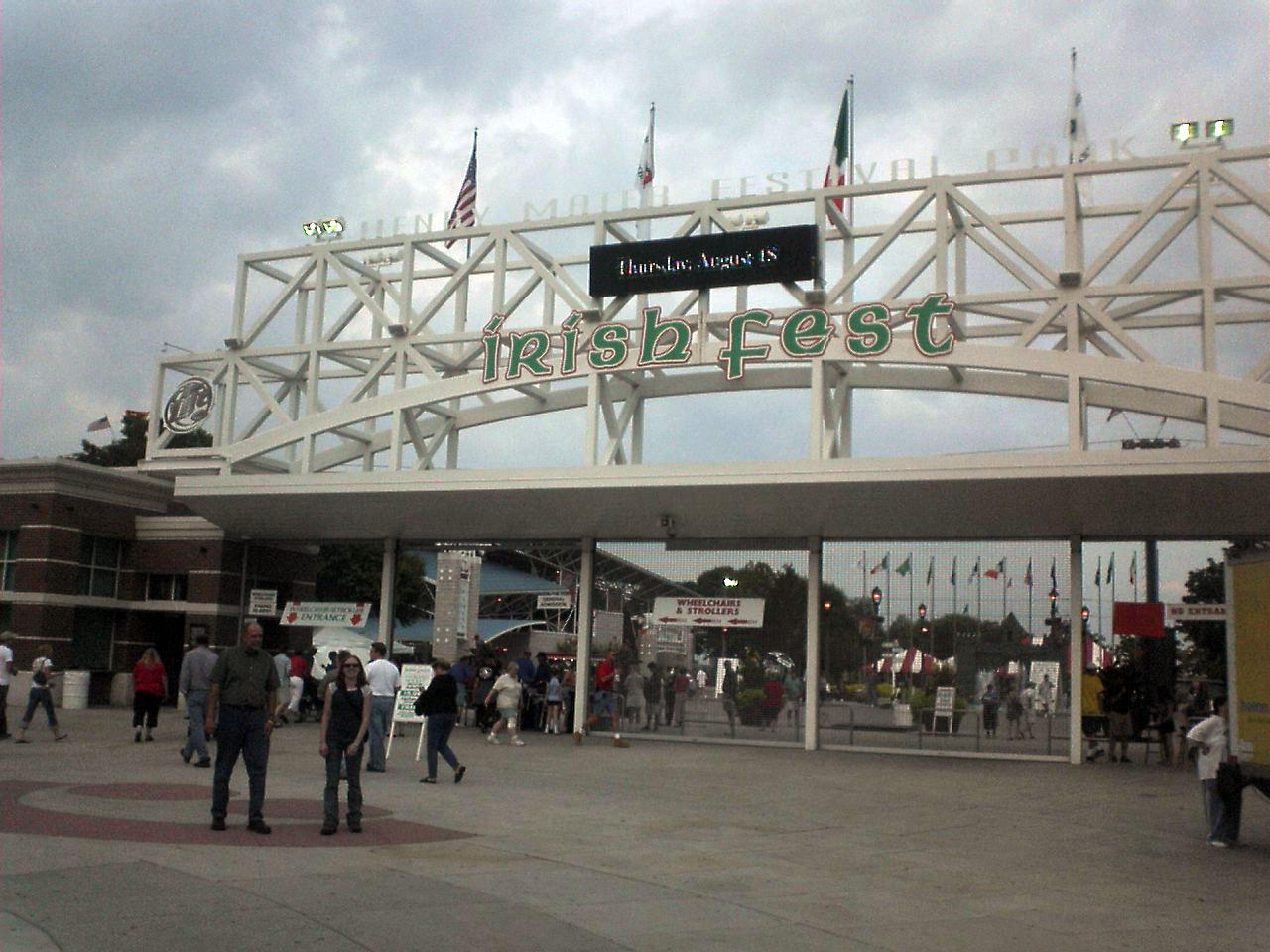
The Mid Gate of the Henry Maier Festival Park, during Milwaukee Irish Fest 2005

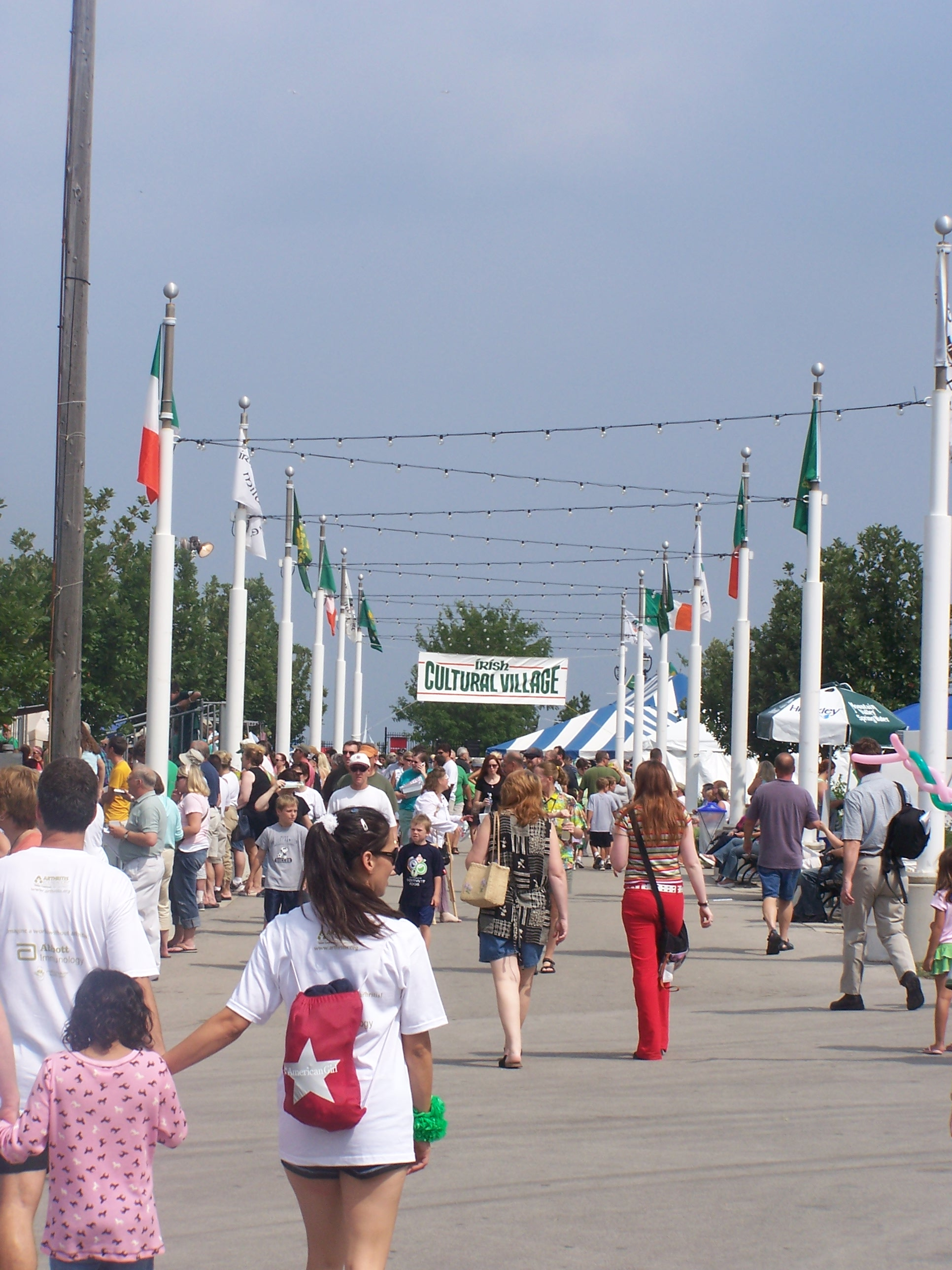
The Cultural Village during Irish Fest

Milwaukee Irish Fest (locally known as Irish Fest) is a yearly Irish-American festival held at Henry Maier Festival Park, on Lake Michigan, United States, every third weekend in August. Over 130,000 people attend the Fest each year to watch nearly 250 acts on 17 stages. The four-day festival started in 1981, founded by Edward J. Ward. Irish Fest is the largest of the ethnic festivals held at the Summerfest grounds which report attendance, and holds claim to the largest celebration of Irish Culture in the world.

Festival highlights include:

- Performances from local Milwaukee Irish Dance troupes
- Music from nearly 250 artists from around the world, sung in both English and Irish
- Stages for Céilí dancing
- An area to learn Céilí dance
- Celebrations of Irish sport: Gaelic Football, Hurling, and Currach racing
- Authentic Irish Cuisine
- A 5k Run/Walk to the festival
- Poetry and photography contests
- Liturgy for Peace and Justice held in the Marcus Amphitheater on Sunday morning

The annual closing event is the Scattering, a gathering of many of the festival's musicians playing together in one combined session, with fifty or more musicians on the stage at one time not uncommon.

Irish Fest celebrated its 25th anniversary in 2005, which saw the opening of the new Celtic Roots stage. President of Ireland, Mary McAleese also attended that year's fest. There was no Irish Fest in 2020 as officials cited the COVID-19 pandemic as grounds for scrapping most events & moving others online.
