= Polish Fest =

Polish festival in Wisconsin

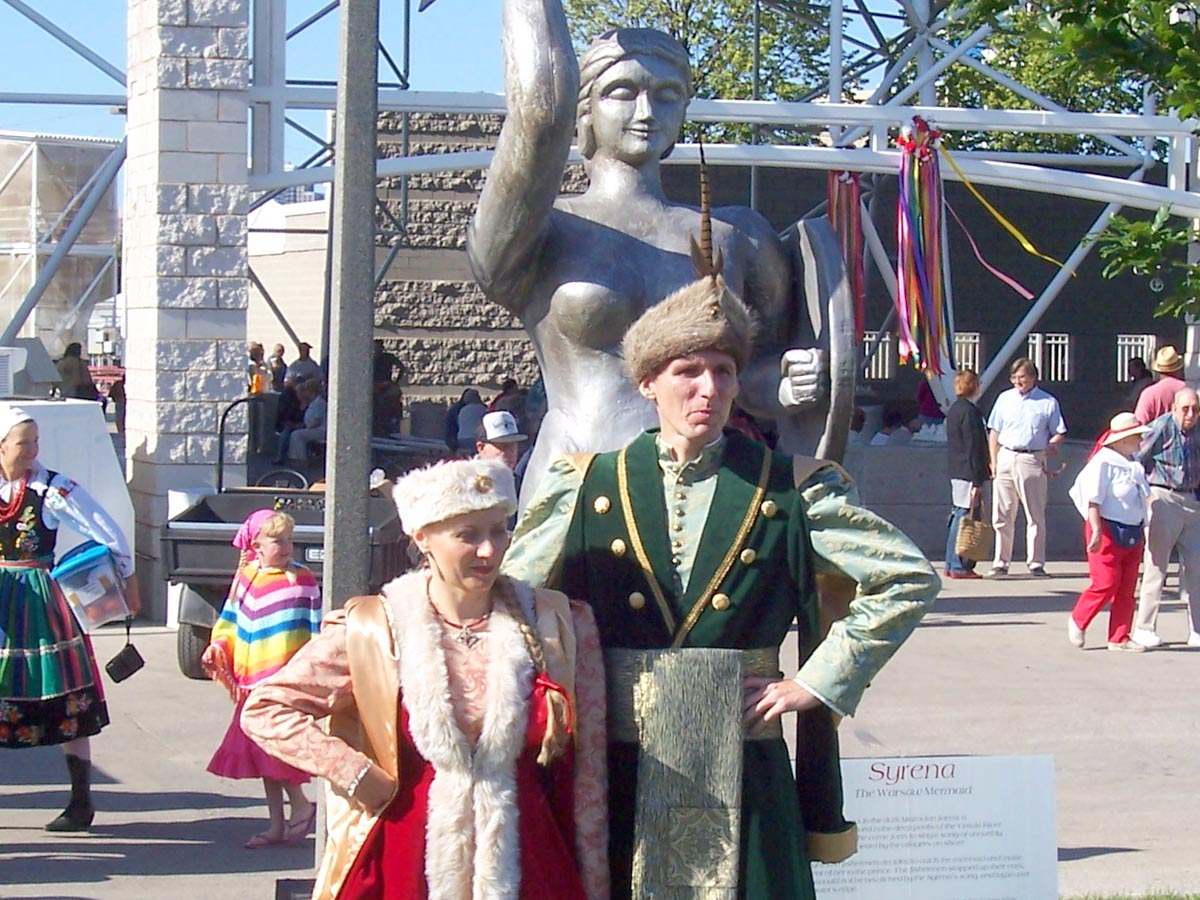
A couple in kontusz costumes posing in front of the Warsaw mermaid

Polish Fest is an annual ethnic festival held at the Henry Maier Festival Park in Milwaukee, Wisconsin, and was established in 1982. One of the largest Polish festivals in the United States, it attracts Polish Americans from all over Wisconsin and nearby Chicago, who come to celebrate Polish culture through music, food and entertainment.

The event, along with Summerfest and many ethnic and cultural festivals held throughout the city, give Milwaukee the nickname "City of Festivals."

== History ==
By 1905, Polish Milwaukeeans were the community's second-largest ethnic group, second only to the Germans. The community built a permanent center for social and cultural promotion, and the Polish Center of Wisconsin was opened in Franklin, Wisconsin, in August 2000.

Since 1999, Polish Fest has featured the Chopin Youth Piano Competition for non-professional pianists in two age divisions: the Junior Division for ages 14 and under and the Senior Division for ages 15 to 18.

Since no Polish Fest was held in 2020 caused by the COVID-19 pandemic, the 39th was deferred to 2021, before being cancelled a second consecutive year. In 2022, the 39th Polish Fest was held from June 10 to June 12.
