= PrideFest Milwaukee =

LGBTQ event in Milwaukee, Wisconsin

- Status: Active
- Genre: Pride parade and festival
- Date: 1988
- Frequency: Annually in June
- Venue: Henry Maier Festival Park
- Locations: 200 North Harbor Drive; Milwaukee, Wisconsin
- Coordinates: 43°01′41″N 87°53′56″W
- Years active: 38
- Inaugurated: 1988
- Sponsor: Milwaukee Pride, Inc.
- Website: pridefest.com

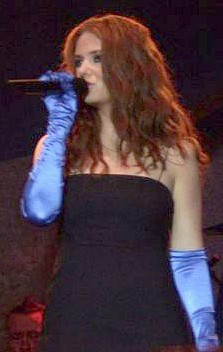
Lena Katina at the 2010 PrideFest event

PrideFest is an annual gay pride event held at the Henry Maier Festival Park in Milwaukee, Wisconsin on the second weekend of June.

== History ==
In 1988, the Milwaukee Lesbian/Gay Pride Committee launched the first officially sanctioned pride celebration in Milwaukee. The event was held in Juneau Park and later to Veterans Park on Milwaukee's lakefront. In 1996, PrideFest secured its current venue at Henry Maier Festival Park.

PrideFest celebrated its 20th anniversary in 2007, which was also a record-breaking attendance year with 27,467 tickets sold over three days.

In 2008, the National Socialist Movement, a hate group according to the Southern Poverty Law Center, protested the event. They were outnumbered by pro-gay protesters.

In 2017, PrideFest Milwaukee's 30th anniversary celebration was attended by over 37,000 people.

One year after celebrating its 30th anniversary, PrideFest broke its attendance record again with 45,400 attendees.

In 2020, the event was cancelled due to COVID-19 and again in 2021.

== See also ==
- Summerfest
- Henry Maier Festival Park
