= Milwaukee Marathon =

Annual marathon in Milwaukee, Wisconsin, US

- Date: March or April
- Location: Milwaukee, Wisconsin
- Event type: Road
- Distance: Marathon, Half Marathon, 5k
- Established: October 31, 2015
- Course records: Men: 2:22:51 (2015); David Tuwei; Women: 2:44:09 (2015); Pauline Mutwa
- Website: http://runmilwaukee.com/

The Milwaukee Marathon is an annual marathon, and a Boston Marathon qualifying race, for runners of all ages and abilities that courses through downtown Milwaukee each spring. It offers three race distances: a full marathon (26.2 miles), a half marathon (13.1 miles), and a 5k (3.1 miles).

The inaugural event, branded the PNC Milwaukee Running Festival, was held on November 1, 2015, and saw great success, attracting 3,700 participants. However, the course was mismeasured two years in a row in 2016 and 2017, with 2016's being too long and 2017's too short. The resulting backlash from runners and city officials threw the future of the race into question.

Seeing the potential to turn the Milwaukee Marathon into a world-class event, Rugged Races, a Boston-based race production company with marathon experience that organizes 90 races annually, bought the Milwaukee Marathon in August 2018 and immediately started to overhaul the event.

== History ==
The inaugural Milwaukee Running Festival Marathon was held in November 2015, but later editions were moved to earlier in the year to reduce conflicts with the Milwaukee Lakefront Marathon. The second edition's route was incorrectly measured at 28 miles (45 km), while the third edition in 2016 was run on a mistakenly shortened course of 25.4 miles (40.9 km). The event was cancelled in 2018 and resumed the following year under new management.

In 2020, several marathons were cancelled or postponed due to the COVID-19 pandemic. A month before the start of the Milwaukee Marathon, Gov. Tony Evers declared a state of emergency, which was later expanded to a stay-at-home order through April 28.

With the state restricting public gatherings, Milwaukee Marathon race organizers announced March 27 that the fifth annual running would be canceled, along will all other races taking place during the April 10–11 weekend. Despite the cancellation, race organizers refused to offer refunds - instead promising a 20% off code that could be used for the following year's race.

Rugged Races was acquired by Ventures Endurance Events LLC and rebranded as Ventures Endurance on June 17, 2021. The company said they were working with the city of Milwaukee on a date and route for the race in fall 2021, and suggested the race would be run in October. The 2021 and 2022 editions were later cancelled.

The Milwaukee Marathon returned for the 2023 season, scheduled to be held on March 25, 2023. A major snowstorm forced the cancellation of the marathon. In 2024, the marathon made its return and has been hosted in mid-April since then.

At the 2026 Milwaukee Marathon, it was discovered that all finisher's medals featured a typographical error in the name of the event, with the medal featuring "Milwaukee Marthon" at the top of the medal. Organizers confirmed corrected medals would not be issued.

The race weekend typically coincides with 414 day, an unofficial Milwaukee Holiday named after the city's area code. In 2027, the race is scheduled for April 10-11.

== Results ==
=== 2021 ===
Race postponed, no date announced.

=== 2020 ===
Races canceled due to COVID-19 pandemic

=== 2016 ===
==== 1 Mile ====
| Men's Leaderboard | | | | | | | Women's Leaderboard | | | | | | |
| Place | Division | Name | Age | City | State | Time (m:s:ms) | Place | Division | Name | Age | City | State | Time (m:s:ms) |
|---|---|---|---|---|---|---|---|---|---|---|---|---|---|
| 1 | Male Overall | Brian Gooley | 24 | Milwaukee | WI | 4:18:68 | 30 | Female Overall | Angie Smith | 32 | Wauwatosa | WI | 5:58:63 |
| 2 | Male Overall | Brian Robertson | 30 | Milwaukee | WI | 4:33:20 | 31 | Female Overall | Melissa Schneider | 14 | Muskego | WI | 6:01:14 |
| 3 | Male Overall | Matt Thull | 41 | Milwaukee | WI | 4:39:58 | 33 | Female 17 & Under | Aubree Kubicki | 10 | Green Bay | WI | 6:09:13 |
| 4 | Male 25–29 | Blake Johnson | 27 | Milwaukee | WI | 4:41:25 | 36 | Female 17 & Under | London Chase | 9 | Wauwatosa | WI | 6:24:58 |
| 5 | Male 25–29 | Ben Peterson | 25 | Sussex | WI | 4:45:76 | 37 | Female 40–44 | Lisa Nondorf | 41 | Ridgeway | WI | 6:32:27 |

==== 5K ====
| Men's Leaderboard | | | | | | | Women's Leaderboard | | | | | | |
| Place | Division | Name | Age | City | State | Time (m:s:ms) | Place | Division | Name | Age | City | State | Time (m:s:ms) |
|---|---|---|---|---|---|---|---|---|---|---|---|---|---|
| 1 | Wheelchair | Kaying Thao | 27 | Milwaukee | WI | 8:59:90 | 30 | Female Overall | Asha Pumphrey-Bush | 30 | Cudahy | WI | 20:18:62 |
| 2 | Wheelchair | Ethan Burkhart | 15 | Libertyville | IL | 13:50:90 | 31 | Female Overall | Caren Mangarelli | 46 | Milwaukee | WI | 20:28:44 |
| 3 | Male overall | Jesse Duvall | 22 | Union Grove | WI | 17:01:58 | 33 | Wheelchair | Kari Craddock | 12 | Richland Center | WI | 20:35:76 |
| 4 | Male Overall | Michael Sevier | 37 | Milwaukee | WI | 17:08:68 | 36 | Female 18–24 | Katie O'Reilly | 24 | Maumee | OH | 20:40:94 |
| 5 | Male Overall | Mark Caballero | 24 | Sussex | WI | 17:17:95 | 37 | Female 17–24 | Meghan Caballero | 24 | Ridgeway | WI | 21:0725 |

==== Half Marathon ====
| Men's Leaderboard | | | | | | | Women's Leaderboard | | | | | | |
| Place | Division | Name | Age | City | State | Time (h:m:s:ms) | Place | Division | Name | Age | City | State | Time (h:m:s:ms) |
|---|---|---|---|---|---|---|---|---|---|---|---|---|---|
| 1 | Wheelchair | Christian Clemmons | 21 | Champaign | IL | 0:58:55:38 | 6 | Female Overall | Gabrielle Anzalone | 23 | Madison | WI | 1:15:24:13 |
| 2 | Wheelchair | Steven Smith | 30 | Plover | WI | 1:03:17:85 | 9 | Female Overall | Cynthia Jerop | 21 | St. Paul | MN | 1:16:43:51 |
| 3 | Male Overall | Austin Bauer | 24 | Decorah | IA | 1:09:35:50 | 10 | Female Overall | Nicole Shortslef | 31 | South Milwaukee | WI | 1:17:36:17 |
| 4 | Male Overall | David Luy | 24 | Brookfield | WI | 1:10:58:50 | 11 | Female 18–24 | Elizabeth Berkholtz | 23 | Milwaukee | WI | 1:17:52:25 |
| 5 | Male Overall | Kyle Fraser | 36 | Sussex | WI | 1:15:14:44 | 16 | Female 25–29 | Flannery Cerbin-Bohach | 29 | Decorah | IA | 1:23:22:07 |

==== Marathon ====
| Men's Leaderboard | | | | | | | Women's Leaderboard | | | | | | |
| Place | Division | Name | Age | City | State | Time (h:m:s:ms) | Place | Division | Name | Age | City | State | Time (h:m:s:ms) |
|---|---|---|---|---|---|---|---|---|---|---|---|---|---|
| 1 | Male Overall | Adam Bohach | 32 | Decorah | IA | 2:26:24:67 | 11 | Female Overall | Denise Manthy | 43 | Wauwatosa | WI | 3:14:40:30 |
| 2 | Male Overall | Alexander Cushman | 23 | Madison | WI | 2:32:33:67 | 21 | Female Overall | Sonya Jongsma Knauss | 41 | Sioux Center | IA | 3:19:44:81 |
| 3 | Male Overall | John Mania | 23 | N/A | N/A | 2:33:15:14 | 28 | Female Overall | Shelby Koontz | 21 | Milwaukee | WI | 3:22:15:53 |
| 4 | Male 25–29 | Joseph Skurski | 25 | Shorewood | WI | 2:33:55:75 | 36 | Female 30–34 | Patricia Schaefer | 34 | Springfield | IL | 3:25:12:96 |
| 5 | Male 30–34 | Tyler Swagerman | 32 | Shorewood | WI | 2:48:13:45 | 43 | Female 35–39 | Ruth Lunz | 38 | Milwaukee | WI | 3:27:57:5 |

=== 2015 ===
==== 1 Mile ====
| Men's Leaderboard | | | | | Women's Leaderboard | | | | |
| Place | Number | Name | Age | Time (m:s) | Place | Number | Name | Age | Time (m:s) |
|---|---|---|---|---|---|---|---|---|---|
| 1 | 6 | Ronald Hedman | 23 | 4:30 | 15 | 103 | Sofie Schunk | 23 | 5:36 |
| 2 | 13 | Brian Robertson | 29 | 4:32 | 18 | 102 | Anna Mayhewrozek | 39 | 5:41 |
| 3 | 10 | Dakota Pruitt | 22 | 4:40 | 22 | 506 | Meghan Teich | 23 | 5:55 |
| 4 | 9 | Ben Peterson | 24 | 4:42 | 23 | 509 | Morgan Toone | 12 | 5:56 |
| 5 | 15 | Matt Thull | 40 | 4:51 | 28 | 101 | Marissa Lovell | 20 | 6:06 |

==== 5K ====
| Men's Leaderboard | | | | | | Women's Leaderboard | | | | | |
| Place | Division | Bib | Name | Native To | Time (m:s) | Place | Division | Bib | Name | Native To | Time (m:s) |
|---|---|---|---|---|---|---|---|---|---|---|---|
| 1 | Male 30–34 | 4941 | David Wheeler | Waukesha, WI | 16:11 | 9 | Female 18–24 | 4880 | Sofie Schunk | Albuquerque, NM | 18:13 |
| 2 | Male 18–24 | 5043 | Sebastian Miller | Muskego, WI | 16:19 | 12 | Female 35–39 | 4570 | Susan Buerger | Hartland, WI | 19:08 |
| 3 | Male 40–44 | 5046 | John Mroz | Muskego, WI | 16:43 | 16 | Female 18–24 | 4595 | Acacia Dishman | Milwaukee, WI | 19:42 |
| 4 | Male 17 & Under | 5130 | Nicholas Holmes | Glendale, WI | 16:55 | 22 | Female 18–24 | 4913 | Meghan Teich | Milwaukee, WI | 20:31 |
| 5 | Male 17 & Under | 4896 | Billy Smith | Hook, UK | 17:12 | 28 | Female 30–34 | 4919 | Sun Torke | Milwaukee, WI | 21:14 |

==== Half Marathon ====
| Men's Leaderboard | | | | | | Women's Leaderboard | | | | | |
| Place | Division | Bib | Name | Native To | Time (h:m:s) | Place | Division | Bib | Name | Native To | Time (h:m:s) |
|---|---|---|---|---|---|---|---|---|---|---|---|
| 1 | Male 25–29 | 3048 | Sammy Rotich | Kenya | 1:06:02 | 13 | Female 25–29 | 3383 | Jebichi Yator | Kenya | 1:16:49 |
| 2 | Male 30–34 | 3423 | Benson Cheruiyot | Valparaiso, IN | 1:06:15 | 16 | Female 25–29 | 3370 | Lauren Woodring | Bethel Park, PA | 1:17:49 |
| 3 | Male 18–24 | 1189 | Evans Chelange | N/A | 1:06:29 | 19 | Female 30–34 | 3557 | Nicole Shortslef | Waukesha, WI | 1:18:48 |
| 4 | Male 25–29 | 2742 | Danny Machmueller | Milwaukee, WI | 1:08:32 | 21 | Female 25–29 | 2871 | Holly Nearman | Monroe, WI | 1:19:58 |
| 5 | Male 30–34 | 3329 | Nathan Weiland | Waunakee, WI | 1:09:37 | 32 | Female 18–24 | 3552 | Lauren Schroeder | Milwaukee, WI | 1:24:37 |

==== Marathon ====
| Men's Leaderboard | | | | | | Women's Leaderboard | | | | | |
| Place | Division | Bib | Name | Native To | Time (h:m:s) | Place | Division | Bib | Name | Native To | Time (h:m:s) |
|---|---|---|---|---|---|---|---|---|---|---|---|
| 1 | Male 35–39 | 983 | David Tuwei | Kenya | 2:22:51 | 7 | Female 25–29 | 1144 | Pauline Mutwa | Minneapolis, MN | 2:44:09 |
| 2 | Male 35–39 | 612 | Sammy Malakwen | Kenya | 2:23:53 | 16 | Female 40–44 | 620 | Denise Manthy | Milwaukee, WI | 2:54:21 |
| 3 | Male 25–29 | 111 | Zachary Bruns | Milwaukee, WI | 2:27:14 | 17 | Female 25–29 | 155 | Amanda Cohen | Milwaukee, WI | 2:55:02 |
| 4 | Male 25–29 | 102 | Thomas Breitbach | Madison, WI | 2:27:34 | 25 | Female 45–49 | 126 | Corina Canitz | Brookfield, WI | 2:58:34 |
| 5 | Male 35–39 | 872 | Robert Schneider | Milwaukee, WI | 2:42:00 | 68 | Female 50–54 | 82 | Mary Bolich | Plymouth, WI | 3:14:43 |
