= Miami Marathon =

American race

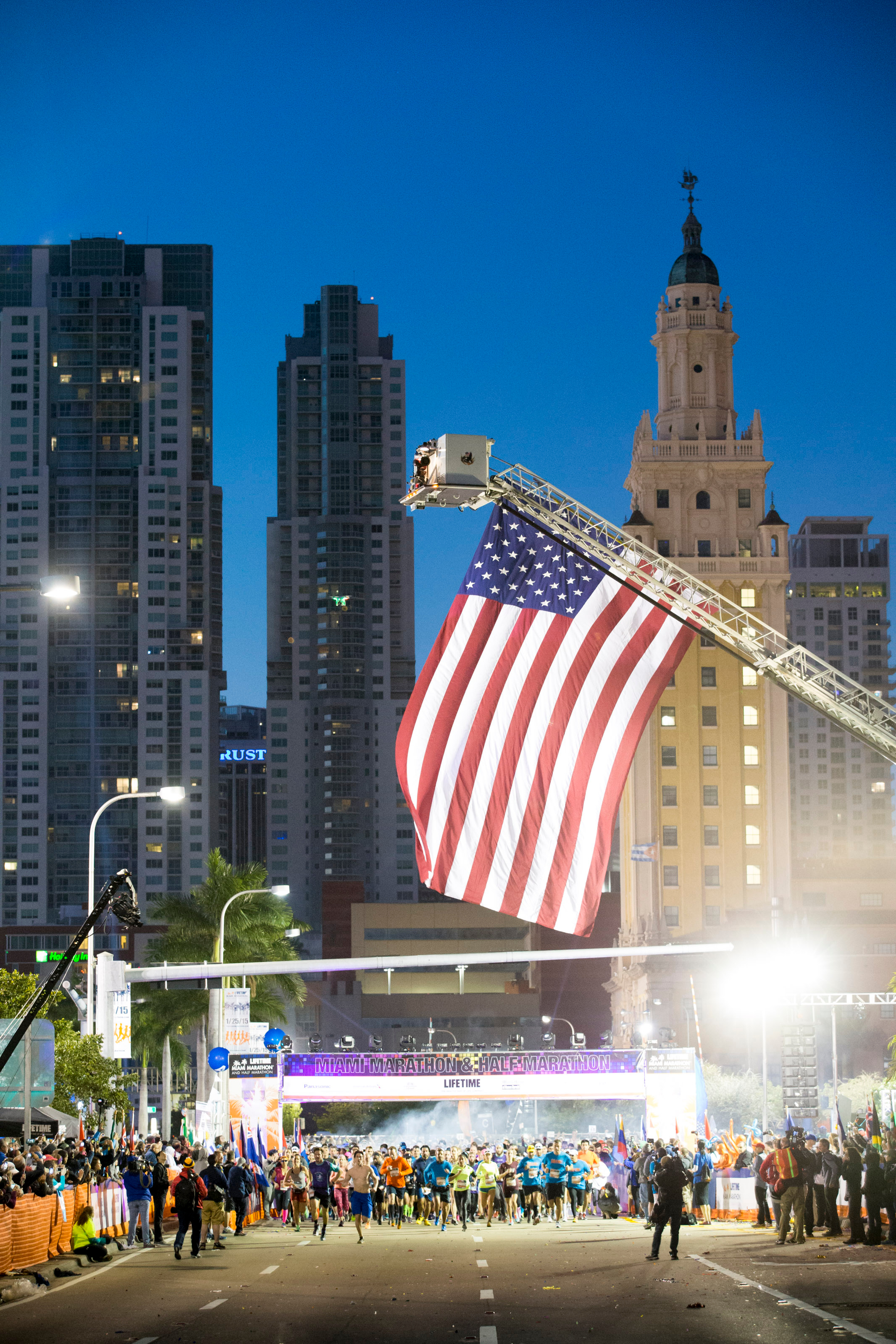
- Start line in front of Freedom Tower in 2015
- Date: January or February
- Location: Miami, Florida
- Event type: Road
- Distance: Marathon, half marathon
- Established: 2003 (23 years ago) (current era)
- Website: www.themiamimarathon.com

The Miami Marathon is an annual marathon racing event hosted by Miami, Florida, since 2003. The marathon course also runs through the city of Miami Beach, Florida. The 42.195-kilometre (26.219 mi) race is typically run on the last Sunday in January or the first Sunday in February, at approximately 6:00 am. The event also includes a half marathon, and a wheelchair division for both races. (Note: The half marathon is started concurrently, while the wheelchair division begins 5–10 minutes before the footrace.) Marathon finish times can be used to qualify for the Boston Marathon. Shifting Gears United is partner for the disability division.

Celebrities or local politicians typically start the race. Frank Shorter, 1972 Olympic marathon champion, and Ryan Hall, winner of the marathon event in the 2008 United States Olympic Trials, have been previously given this honor.

Life Time Fitness produces this event.

== History ==
Orange Bowl Marathon
- Date: Usually January
- Location: Miami, Florida
- Event type: Road
- Distance: Marathon
- Established: 1977 (49 years ago)

=== Orange Bowl era ===
The inaugural Orange Bowl Marathon, established as part of the annual King Orange Jamboree, was held on December 26, 1977, with over 800 participants.

Originally the race had started and finished in the Orange Bowl stadium but after issues with the course the start and finish moved to the Crandon Park. The marathon was never as popular as other races in the racing calendar and had trouble attracting athletes. Eventually, financial problems caused the event to fold.

The last Orange Bowl Marathon that the Association of Road Racing Statisticians has record of was held in 1988.

=== Current era ===
The inaugural race was held on February 2, 2003 with about 3,400 participants.

The race has been growing over the years. In 2010,18,321 runners took part in the combined races. For the 10 year anniversary in 2012 the race sold out at 25,000 runners and has continued to reach that number of participants since.

The 2021 edition of the race was cancelled due to the coronavirus pandemic. with all registrants given the option of running the race virtually, transferring their entry to 2022, or obtaining a refund (less any processing fees).

The race had begun to decline in size and popularity since its peak in the mid 2010s. However, when it returned from COVID in 2022, it did so with a sold out field that included 15,000 runners across the entire weekend of events. The following year, the total field size increased to about 18,000 runners, and the race was sold out by October. Since then, the race has sold out increasingly quickly. The 2026 Miami Marathon opened registration on August 1, 2025, and general registration for the marathon was sold out by August 11.

== Course ==
External image
- Course map of full marathon in 2017

Beginning on Biscayne Boulevard next to the Miami-Dade Arena (home of the Miami Heat), the course takes runners eastbound on the MacArthur Causeway, past cruise ships docked at the Port of Miami, to South Beach. From there, competitors travel northbound along the famous Ocean Drive, through the City of Miami Beach, and then westbound along the Venetian Causeway and back to the mainland and the City of Miami. Here, the Miami Half Marathon finishes and the full marathon continues southbound through the financial district, Brickell, into Coconut Grove, out the Rickenbacker Causeway towards Key Biscayne, and then back through Brickell and downtown Miami to complete the 42.195 kilometres (26.219 mi) at Bayfront Park.

Through partnership with Shifting Gears United of South Florida, the Miami Marathon hosts a division for athletes with all disabilities. Sub-divisions include open divisions (male and female), push-rim, and handcycle.

== Winners ==
=== Orange Bowl era ===
Year	Men	Time	Women	Time	Rf.
1977	Pat Chmiel	2:24:20	Jane Killian	2:54:13	
1978	not held (Note: The marathon was initially held with the annual King Orange Jamboree, and although the inaugural race was held on December 26, 1977, subsequent marathons from 1979 to 1988 were held in January or February.)				
1979	Stan Curran	2:19:12	Gayle Olinek	2:55:08	
1980	Ken Misner	2:18:31	Dorthe Rasmussen	2:40:35	
1981	Benji Durden	2:12:33	Carol Gould	2:41:39	
1982	Dave Long	2:12:16.8	Charlotte Teske	2:29:01.6	
1983	Bill Rodgers	2:15:07	Monika Lovinich	2:35:16	
1984	Tommy Persson	2:13:26	Joelle de Brouwer	2:44:41	
1985	Jimmy Ashworth	2:18:49	Jan Yerkes	2:41:31	
1986	Bernard Bobes	2:21:26	Shirley Silsby	2:53:18	
1987	John Boyes	2:23:22	Jan Yerkes	2:52:00	
1988	Dennis Rinde	2:23:19	Maureen Hurst	2:50:32	

Source: Biscayne, Ken (January 9, 1987). "Race on the Rise: New Sponsor Puts Orange Bowl Marathon on the Road to New Life". Sun Sentinel.

=== Current era ===
Year	Men	Time	Women	Time	Rf.
2003	David Ruto	2:12:22	Volga Yudziankova	2:40:23	
2004	William Gomez Amorin	2:14:42	Stacie Alboucrek	2:42:32	
2005	Elias Rodrigues Bastos	2:17:24	Sandra Ruales Mosquera	2:37:00	
2006	Ruben Garcia Gomez	2:18:15	Hiromi Ominami	2:34:11	
2007	Teshome Gelana	2:17:51	Ramilla Burangulova	2:40:22	
2008	Jose Garcia	2:17:43	Kelly Liljeblad	2:47:13	
2009	Benazzouz Slimani	2:16:49	Michele Suskek	2:43:31	
2010	Michael Wardian	2:28:39	Brett Ely	2:45:36	
2011	Tesfaye Alemayehu	2:12:57	Alena Vinitskaya	2:44:38	
2012	Sammy Malakwen	2:16:55	Raquel Maraviglia	2:41:39	
2013	Luis Carlos Rivero González	2:26:14	Mariska Kramer	2:46:07	
2014	Sammy Malakwen	2:19:46	Mariska Kramer	2:49:28	
2015	Luis Carlos Rivero González	2:20:47	Alemnesh Ashetu Habtemikael	2:39:31	
2016	Benazzouz Slimani	2:24:56	Allison Kieffer	2:55:30	
2017	Christopher Zablocki	2:18:15	Marta Ayela	2:40:51	
2018	Hillary Too	2:23:03	Lyubov Denisova	2:40:54	
2019	Ezekiel Kipsang	2:16:36	Kate Landau	2:37:48	
2020	Saidi Juma Makula	2:21:59	Aydee Loayza Huaman	2:46:52	
2021	cancelled due to coronavirus pandemic				
2022	Jackson Limo	2:21:34	Martha Akeno	2:29:00	
2023	George Onyancha	2:18:26	Damaris Areba	2:33:51	
2024	George Onyancha	2:17:34	Leah Rotich	2:41:39	
