= Fargo Marathon =

U.S. road race

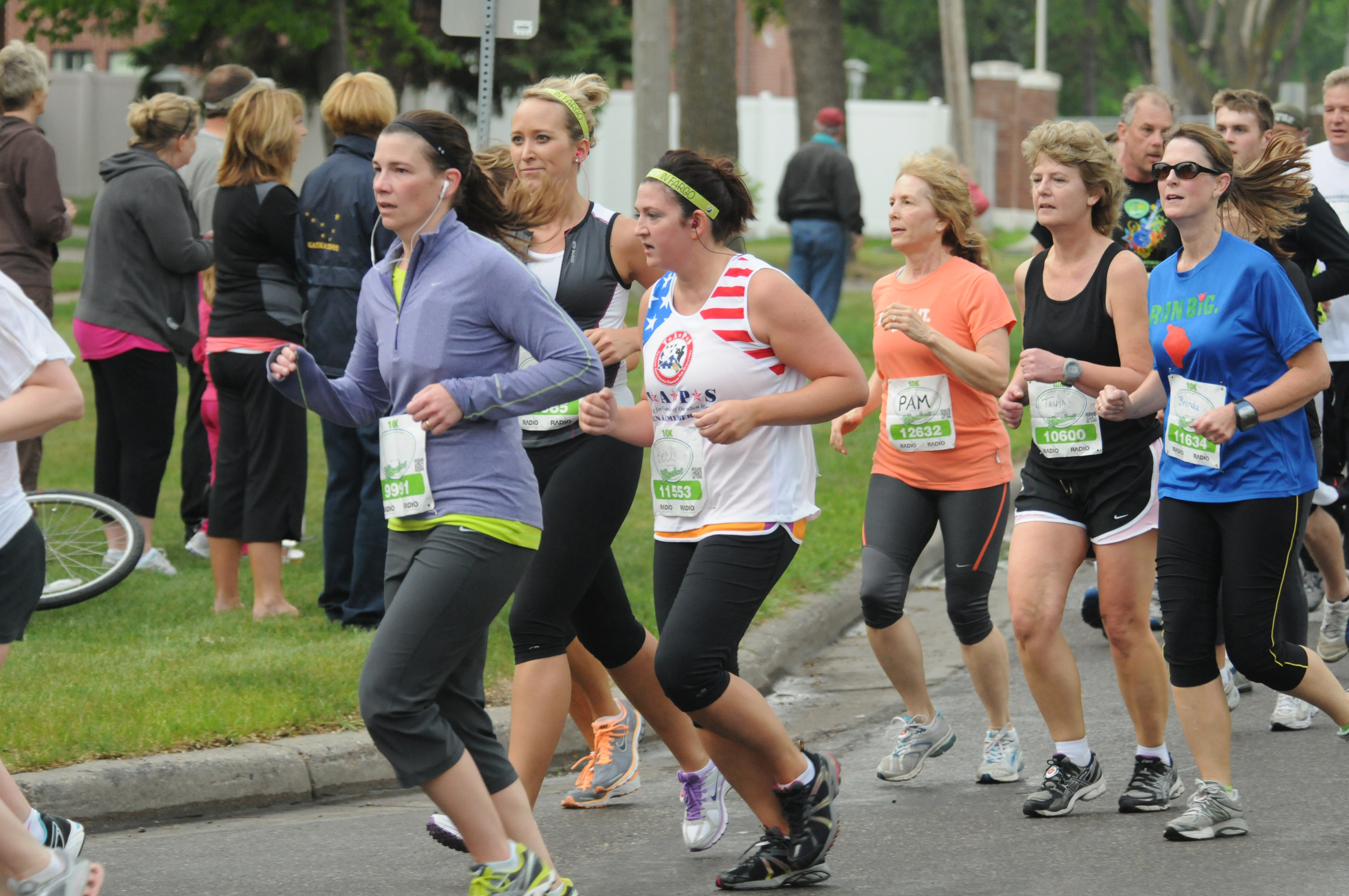
- 10K race in 2012
- Date: June 1, 2024
- Location: Fargo, North Dakota, U.S.
- Event type: Road
- Distance: Marathon
- Primary sponsor: Essentia Health
- Established: 2005 (21 years ago)
- Course records: Abraham Talam Kipkemei; 2:19:24 (2023) and Semehar Tesfaye; 2:37:27 (2016)
- Website: fargomarathon.com
- Participants: 1360 finishers (2019)

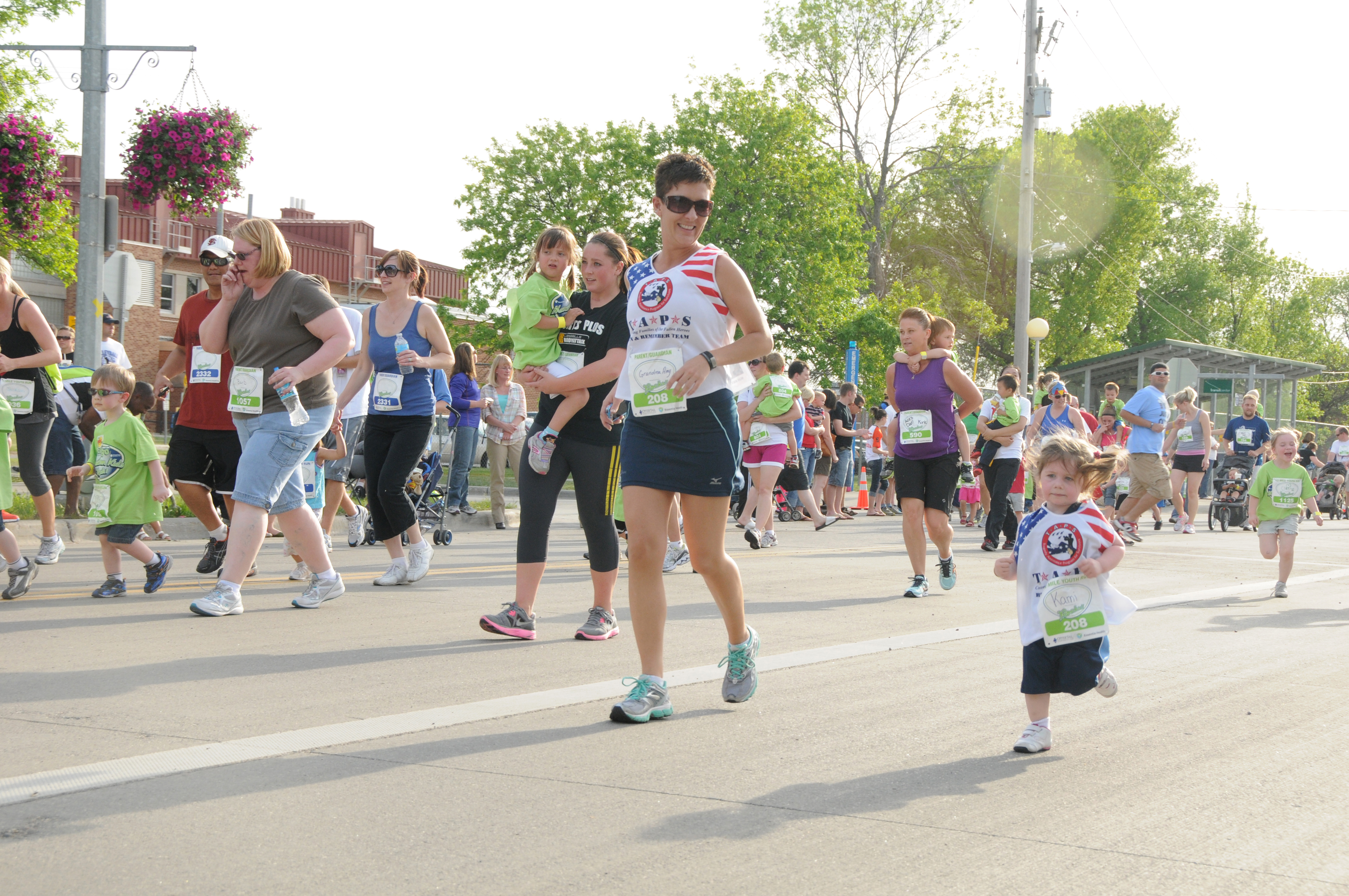
Youth Run in 2012

The Fargo Marathon is an annual road running marathon in Fargo, North Dakota, first held in 2005. Most years, it begins and ends inside the Fargodome, and the course also travels through Moorhead, Minnesota, Fargo's twin city. The event weekend also hosts a half marathon, 10K, and 5K. The race is a USATF-qualified course, so marathon finish times can be used to qualify for the Boston Marathon. The event has been sponsored by Sanford Health, but is now sponsored by Essentia Health

== History ==
The inaugural Fargo Marathon took place on May 14, 2005, and started on the Veterans Memorial Bridge over the Red River between Minnesota and North Dakota. The first year's race weekend offered a 5K on Friday, and a marathon, marathon relay, and a half marathon on Saturday, starting at 8 a.m. Almost 3,000 runners were present for the races, and prize money was offered (including $400 for first place in the marathons). The race drew on local bands for music on the course (25 live bands were at the course in the early years), and local culture was prominent (those years featured a "pasta/lefse feed" for pre-race carbo-loading). In that initial year, racers had raised $20,000 for two local charities: The Children's Museum at Yunker Farm and MeritCare Children's Hospital.

The race was founded and run by Mark Knutson at a time when local races were becoming more prominent as tourist attractions, but also as places where cities could build associations as being health-focused communities. The races also offered showcasing opportunities for area athletes that otherwise would have to travel elsewhere to have their talent recognized.

In the second year, the race weekend drew runners from 46 states, three countries, and had an estimated economic impact of a $1.5 million boost to the local businesses and charities. The half marathon was one of the most popular events, drawn nearly 2,000 runners. It also spawned a collaboration with the Lake Agassiz Arts Council, which sponsored a Native-focused "Herd About the Prairie" art exhibition. The exhibition placed a collection of 39 decorated buffalo sculptures (the size of real buffalo) throughout the marathon course.

In 2010, Runner's World reported the race held a high entry-fee-to-value quality.

As the race progressed in years, it maintained a reputation for being flat, fast, supportive, and loud (with the dozens of bands throughout the course, including rock, dance, oldies, Native drumming, and polka). It has grown in numbers to more than 20,000 runners. The pre-race convention brings food, businesses and speakers to the event center for the thousands of runners and spectators. By 2014, the prize money for first place had also increased to $1,400, with multiple other prizes for top competitors.

In 2019, Knutson sold the race to Rugged Races, though Knutson stayed on as the race director.

In 2020, the first known case of the COVID-19 virus appeared in North Dakota on March 11. Within two days, the country began shutting down, and North Dakota issued a state of emergency. The marathon was rescheduled, but due to the rising number of cases in summer of 2020, it was cancelled. All registrants were given the option of a refund, a postponement to 2021, or running the race on their own course and time.

Similarly, the 2021 edition of the race was postponed to September 25, 2021, due to the pandemic. Participation was at 50 percent of normal, as the race date was close to other Minnesota marathons: The postponed Med City Marathon, the smaller Ely Marathon and the larger Twin Cities Marathon. Race organizers also said the closed Canadian border kept runners away.

== Media coverage ==
Radio coverage has been provided by KFGO. TV coverage has been provided by WDAY-TV, an ABC affiliate.

== Course ==
External images
- Course map of full marathon in 2012
- Combined course map in 2016

The marathon, half marathon, and 10K all start and finish inside the Fargodome.

The marathon course also crosses over the Red River into Minnesota and back, spending about 6 mi (10 km) in Moorhead, Fargo's twin city.

The course goes through Concordia College's campus in Moorhead, Minnesota, where the Concordia Cobber hands out high-fives. It also circles through Minnesota State University Moorhead's campus, where the MSUM Dragon cheers on the runners.

In 2009, the course had to be changed due to flooding. The marathon route took two laps instead of one large loop.

In 2014, in celebration of 10 years of the race, the route changed. It started on the bridge, just as it did on the first year. The finish line wasn't inside; it was near the Fargo Theatre on Broadway Street in downtown Fargo. The change was only for one year.

== Half marathon ==
Sammy Malakwen, a two-time winner, set the half marathon course record in 2010 at 1:04:27.

== Repeat winners ==
Semehar Tesfaye has won the women's race three years in a row and set the course record in 2016 (2:37:27). Tesfaye graduated from Fargo South High School.

== Winners ==
Key: Course record

All cities in North Dakota unless indicated otherwise

	Men					Women					
Year	Place	Name	Age	Hometown	Time	Year	Place	Name	Age	Hometown	Time
2026	1st place, gold medalist(s)	Tristan da Silva	27	Winnipeg, Manitoba	2:32:00	2026	1st place, gold medalist(s)	Haylee Hocking	33	Fargo	3:00:02
2026	2nd place, silver medalist(s)					2026	2nd place, silver medalist(s)				
2026	3rd place, bronze medalist(s)					2026	3rd place, bronze medalist(s)				
2025	1st place, gold medalist(s)	Tucker Ringhand	24	Ironton, Minnesota	2:26:20	2025	1st place, gold medalist(s)	Erin Forde	32	Missoula, Montana	2:45:50
2025	2nd place, silver medalist(s)					2025	2nd place, silver medalist(s)				
2025	3rd place, bronze medalist(s)					2025	3rd place, bronze medalist(s)				
2024	1st place, gold medalist(s)	Digger Lauter	40	Oakland, California	2:25:32	2024	1st place, gold medalist(s)	Amy Will	37	Warren, Minnesota	2:57:18
2024	2nd place, silver medalist(s)	Ruairi Moynihan	34	Flagstaff, Arizona	2:28:39	2024	2nd place, silver medalist(s)	Ericka Mason	33	Fort Worth, Texas	2:57:40
2024	3rd place, bronze medalist(s)	Leo Smith	23	West Fargo	2:29:15	2024	3rd place, bronze medalist(s)	Anna Wiseman	28	Kansas City, Missouri	2:58:01
2023	1st place, gold medalist(s)	Abraham Kipkemei Talam	45	Kenya	2:19:24	2023	1st place, gold medalist(s)	Sadie Smith	44	Kirkwood, Missouri	2:57:46
2023	2nd place, silver medalist(s)	Connor Reck	29	Minneapolis, Minnesota	2:24:29	2023	2nd place, silver medalist(s)	Amy Will	35	Warren, Minnesota	3:04:14
2023	3rd place, bronze medalist(s)	Daniel Docherty	33	St. Paul, Minnesota	2:31:16	2023	3rd place, bronze medalist(s)	Lindsey Elste	40	Wheaton, Illinois	3:04:31
2021	1st place, gold medalist(s)	Mark Messmer	28	Castle Rock, Colorado	2:21:01	2021	1st place, gold medalist(s)	Heidi Bock	35	Lincoln, Nebraska	2:58:28
2021	2nd place, silver medalist(s)	Benjamin Kopecky	36	St. Louis, Missouri	2:35:39	2021	2nd place, silver medalist(s)	Cheryl Jeseritz	42	Savage, Minnesota	3:02:00
2021	3rd place, bronze medalist(s)	Alec Sanbeck	22	Mora, Minnesota	2:40:05	2021	3rd place, bronze medalist(s)	Krista Kuglin	29	Brainerd, Minnesota	3:05:51
2020		Race canceled due to COVID-19 pandemic**				2020		Race canceled due to COVID-19 pandemic**			
2019	1st place, gold medalist(s)	Arturs Bareikis	32	Midlothian, Illinois	2:27:14	2019	1st place, gold medalist(s)	Val Curtis	32	Minot	2:43:08
2019	2nd place, silver medalist(s)	Anthony Kirui	39	Minneapolis, Minnesota	2:28:58	2019	2nd place, silver medalist(s)	Megan Smith	28	Denver, Colorado	2:44:29
2019	3rd place, bronze medalist(s)	Daniel Borash	25	Burnsville, Minnesota	2:29:39	2019	3rd place, bronze medalist(s)	Ericka Mason	28	Fort Worth, Texas	2:48:16
2018	1st place, gold medalist(s)	Geoffrey Terer	41	Colorado Springs, Colorado	2:30:00	2018	1st place, gold medalist(s)	Semehar Tesfaye	27	Revere, Massachusetts	2:39:22
2018	2nd place, silver medalist(s)	Adam Pangrac	30	Fargo	2:30:39	2018	2nd place, silver medalist(s)	Jen Van Otterloo	31	Sioux Center, Iowa	2:44:17
2018	3rd place, bronze medalist(s)	Zach Bruns	32	Milwaukee, Wisconsin	2:32:58	2018	3rd place, bronze medalist(s)	Joan Cherop Massah	28	Andover, Minnesota	2:45:48
2017	1st place, gold medalist(s)	David Tuwei	38	Minneapolis, Minnesota	2:28:24	2017	1st place, gold medalist(s)	Semehar Tesfaye	26	Minot	2:38:06
2017	2nd place, silver medalist(s)	Bernard Too	31	Grand Prairie, Texas	2:29:25	2017	2nd place, silver medalist(s)	Lindsey Pierret	29	St. Louis Park, Minnesota	2:48:11
2017	3rd place, bronze medalist(s)	Arturs Bareikis	29	Crestwood, Illinois	2:32:25	2017	3rd place, bronze medalist(s)	Katie Rusch	33	St. Cloud, Minnesota	2:57:30
2016	1st place, gold medalist(s)	Sammy Malakwen	37	Kaptagat, Kenya	2:26:06	2016	1st place, gold medalist(s)	Semehar Tesfaye	25	Minot	2:37:27
2016	2nd place, silver medalist(s)	Bernard Kibet	30	Grand Prairie, Texas	2:31:22	2016	2nd place, silver medalist(s)	Darolyn Walker	34	Winnipeg, Canada	2:59:33
2016	3rd place, bronze medalist(s)	Cesar Mireles	26	Richey, Montana	2:33:17	2016	3rd place, bronze medalist(s)	Jane Rotich	35	Grand Prairie, Texas	3:01:11
2015	1st place, gold medalist(s)	David Tuwei	36	Minneapolis, Minnesota	2:27:15	2015	1st place, gold medalist(s)	Ellie Peterson	25	Windsor, Colorado	2:49:13
2015	2nd place, silver medalist(s)	Keith Lehman	23	Fargo	2:30:41	2015	2nd place, silver medalist(s)	Margaret Ludick	30	Birchwood, Minnesota	2:57:05
2015	3rd place, bronze medalist(s)	Adam Pangrac	27	Fargo	2:36:20	2015	3rd place, bronze medalist(s)	Maddie Glass	25	Kansas City, Missouri	2:57:37
2014	1st place, gold medalist(s)	Peter Kemboi	34	Hebron, Kentucky	2:26:55	2014	1st place, gold medalist(s)	Kate Papenberg	27	Syracuse, Utah	2:53:18
2014	2nd place, silver medalist(s)	Arturs Bareikis	27	Crestwood, Illinois	2:27:29	2014	2nd place, silver medalist(s)	Andrea Rediger	25	Minneapolis, Minnesota	2:56:35
2014	3rd place, bronze medalist(s)	Philip Richert	27	Richfield, Minnesota	2:36:13	2014	3rd place, bronze medalist(s)	Amber Sargent	26	Beatrice, Nebraska	3:01:26
2013	1st place, gold medalist(s)	Chris Erichsen	27	Minneapolis, Minnesota	2:20:42	2013	1st place, gold medalist(s)	Nichole Porath	29	Northfield, Minnesota	2:50:55
2013	2nd place, silver medalist(s)	James Kirwa	29	Alexandria, Minnesota	2:21:32	2013	2nd place, silver medalist(s)	Brittney Christianson	25	Minot	2:56:06
2013	3rd place, bronze medalist(s)	Wojciech Kopec	30	Warsaw, Poland	2:34:17	2013	3rd place, bronze medalist(s)	Jenny Schulze	40	Clive, Iowa	2:59:47
2012	1st place, gold medalist(s)	Oliver Hoffmann	27	Schillerstrasse, Germany	2:28:15	2012	1st place, gold medalist(s)	Lisa Dyer	29	Moorhead, Minnesota	2:45:15
2012	2nd place, silver medalist(s)	Russell Stein	39	San Francisco, California	2:34:53	2012	2nd place, silver medalist(s)	Meg Grindall	31	Moorhead, Minnesota	2:53:08
2012	3rd place, bronze medalist(s)	Zane Grabau	23	Waterville, Minnesota	2:35:34	2012	3rd place, bronze medalist(s)	Brittney Christianson	25	Burlington	2:54:01
2011	1st place, gold medalist(s)	Luke Watson	30	State College, Pennsylvania	2:22:50	2011	1st place, gold medalist(s)	Camille Herron	29	West Lafayette, Indiana	2:43:41
2011	2nd place, silver medalist(s)	Jerry Faulkner	30	Edmond, Oklahoma	2:24:12	2011	2nd place, silver medalist(s)	Heidi Evans	26	Thief River Falls, Minnesota	2:54:07
2011	3rd place, bronze medalist(s)	Hillary Cheruiyot	30	Coon Rapids, Minnesota	2:26:53	2011	3rd place, bronze medalist(s)	Cindy Sondag	35	Grand Forks	2:57:36
2010	1st place, gold medalist(s)	Chris Erichsen	24	St. Paul, Minnesota	2:19:55	2010	1st place, gold medalist(s)	Leah Thorvilson	31	Little Rock, Arkansas	2:41:52
2010	2nd place, silver medalist(s)	Hillary Cheruiyot	29	Coon Rapids, Minnesota	2:25:35	2010	2nd place, silver medalist(s)	Gina Aalgaard Kelly	33	Lisbon	2:57:31
2010	3rd place, bronze medalist(s)	Obed Gisemba	30	Windom, Minnesota	2:35:10	2010	3rd place, bronze medalist(s)	Paula Vicker	45	Edina, Minnesota	2:59:10
2009*	1st place, gold medalist(s)	Pete Gilman	34	Rochester, Minnesota	2:25:34	2009*	1st place, gold medalist(s)	Nicole Cueno	29	Minneapolis, Minnesota	2:54:28
2009*	2nd place, silver medalist(s)	Sammy Malakwen	30	Two Harbors, Minnesota	2:25:31	2009*	2nd place, silver medalist(s)	Nichole Porath	25	Eagan, Minnesota	2:58:11
2009*	3rd place, bronze medalist(s)	Geoffrey Kiprotich	30	Toledo, Ohio	2:26:53	2009*	3rd place, bronze medalist(s)	Tracy Thelen	29	Colorado Springs, Colorado	2:59:18
2008	1st place, gold medalist(s)	Eric Sondag	35	Grand Forks	2:30:34	2008	1st place, gold medalist(s)	Andrea McGehee	39	Lees Summit, Missouri	3:08:41
2008	2nd place, silver medalist(s)	Brian Anderson	26	Minneapolis, Minnesota	2:32:18	2008	2nd place, silver medalist(s)	Heather Gilbertson	36	Seattle, Washington	3:12:13
2008	3rd place, bronze medalist(s)	John Rotich	32	Coon Rapids, Minnesota	2:33:15	2008	3rd place, bronze medalist(s)	Clarice Esslinger	43	Mankato, Minnesota	3:16:04
2007	1st place, gold medalist(s)	Chad Wallin	27	Tucson, Arizona	2:31:20	2007	1st place, gold medalist(s)	Valerie Gortmaker	31	Omaha, Nebraska	2:49:55
2007	2nd place, silver medalist(s)	Eric Sondag	34	Grand Forks	2:33:46	2007	2nd place, silver medalist(s)	Heidi Schuette	33	Prescott, Arizona	2:59:18
2007	3rd place, bronze medalist(s)	Shawn Miller	27	Juneau, Alaska	2:34:28	2007	3rd place, bronze medalist(s)	Angie Paprocki	31	Hoffman Estates, Illinois	3:03:36
2006	1st place, gold medalist(s)	Chad Wallin	26	Minot	2:31:48	2006	1st place, gold medalist(s)	Meg Grindall	25	Fargo	3:04:43
2006	2nd place, silver medalist(s)	Shawn Miller	26	Juneau, Alaska	2:32:33	2006	2nd place, silver medalist(s)	Terri Cook	30	Exton, Pennsylvania	3:08:28
2006	3rd place, bronze medalist(s)	Brandon Moen	22	Mankato, Minnesota	2:37:44	2006	3rd place, bronze medalist(s)	Mindy Sawtelle	33	Indiana, Pennsylvania	3:08:34
2005	1st place, gold medalist(s)	Scott Jansky	31	Two Rivers, Wisconsin	2:31:12	2005	1st place, gold medalist(s)	Cindy Lewandowski	25	Sartell, Minnesota	3:16:29
2005	2nd place, silver medalist(s)	Jim Ramacier	41	White Bear Lake, Minnesota	2:44:04	2005	2nd place, silver medalist(s)	Suzy Steely	46	Spring, Texas	3:20:49
2005	3rd place, bronze medalist(s)	Jeffery Stinson	31	Eugene, Oregon	2:48:07	2005	3rd place, bronze medalist(s)	Yvette Dockendorf	35	St. Stephen, Minnesota	3:24:41

*In 2009, the Red River flooded, forcing the marathon course to be two smaller loops.

**A "virtual" race was scheduled.

== Participation ==
Ed.	Year	Marathon finishers	Total participants (Note: Includes participants of all races, including the 5K)	Rf.
1	2005	707	2271	
2	2006	982	6053	
3	2007	1196	9350	
4	2008	1427	12,146	
5	2009	1272	14,000	
6	2010	1885		
7	2011	2213		
8	2012	1825		
9	2013	1645		
10	2014	1655		
11	2015	1535		
12	2016	1493	22,000	
13	2017			
14	2018			
15	2019			
-	2020			
16	2021			
