= Tariku Jufar =

Ethiopian long-distance runner

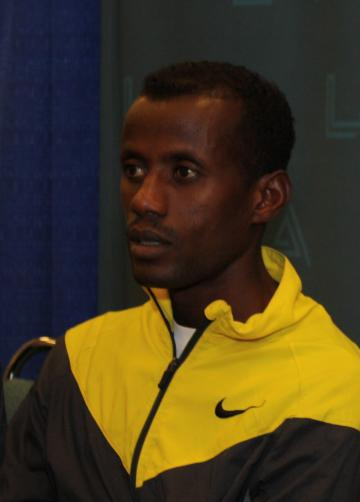
Tariku Jufar at the 2009 Los Angeles Marathon conference

Tariku Jufar (born 18 July 1984) is an Ethiopian long-distance runner who competes in marathon races. He has won the Beijing, Beirut and Houston Marathons and has had top-three finishes in Istanbul, Mumbai, Los Angeles, Lake Biwa and Hamburg. His personal best for the distance is 2:06:51 hours (set in 2012).

In addition to marathon running, he also represented his country at the IAAF World Half Marathon Championships in 2003 and 2007.

== Career ==
Born in Debre Zeyit in Ethiopia's Oromia Region, he took up running after seeing the success of Haile Gebrselassie at the World Championships and Olympic Games. He started to train and moved to Addis Ababa around 2003.

His rise as a professional athlete began at the 2003 Ethiopian half marathon championships, where he was runner-up behind Dereje Adere. As a result, he was chosen for the Ethiopian team at the 2003 IAAF World Half Marathon Championships, where he came 17th. That year he was also third at the Paderborn Easter Run and second at the Reims Half Marathon.

He did not build upon this success until 2006, when he returned to major half marathon running with a runner-up finish at the Nice Half Marathon and a fifth place at the Delhi Half Marathon. His debut over the marathon distance came in January 2007 and he transitioned well, taking third place at the Mumbai Marathon in a time of 2:12:49 hours. An appearance at the Paris Marathon followed, but he could only manage 11th at the higher profile race. He represented Ethiopia in the half marathon at the 2007 All-Africa Games, coming eighth, and he ran a personal best of 61:28 minutes for 18th place at the 2007 IAAF World Road Running Championships. His final outing of the year came at the Istanbul Eurasia Marathon and his third-place finish in 2:11:05 hours was the beginning of a marathon-focused period of his career.

Tariku Jufar led for the early stages of the Mumbai Marathon in January 2008 and held on to take second place behind Kenya's John Kelai. A career best time of 2:08:10 hours came at the Hamburg Marathon three months later (where he was third) The Toronto Waterfront Marathon was promoted as a rematch between him and Kelai, but both had sub-standard races – the Ethiopian was 13th and his time of 2:18:47 hours was by far the slowest of his professional career. His performance at December's Singapore Marathon was even slower, as he came tenth in 2:19:20 hours.

While training in Addis Ababa in 2009 he was hit by a car and the resulting injuries left him unable to compete for nine months. His sole marathon of 2009, the Los Angeles Marathon, saw him return to form and he completed the distance in 2:09:32 hours (his second sub-2:10 hour run) to take the runner-up spot behind Wesley Korir. Tariku had mixed results in the 2010 season: he returned to Los Angeles and came seventh in a time of 2:11:49 hours, but was some six minutes slower at the Florence Marathon, where he came fifth.

The 2011 Mumbai Marathon was tightly contested and although Tariku was fourteen seconds behind the winner Girma Assefa, this left him in fourth place. His second run of the year came in Istanbul and a late-stage duel against Vincent Kiplagat resulted in a runner-up finish for the Ethiopian. Just over a month later, he took to the course at the Beirut Marathon and he ran a course record time of 2:11:14 hours, seeing off a challenge from Sammy Malakwen.

The 2012 Houston Marathon saw Tariku reach a new career high: he won the race in a personal best time of 2:06:51, which was a state record for Texas. He managed only tenth at the Paris Marathon but returned to the top of the podium at the Beijing Marathon which he won in 2:09:39 hours. He was a close second to Vincent Kipruto at the Lake Biwa Marathon in February 2013. In May he became the first Ethiopian winner at the Ottawa Marathon in a course record time of 2:08:05 hours. He won the Tiberias Marathon in January 2014 then had his second fastest ever outing at the Seoul International Marathon, running 2:07:02 for fourth place.
