= Henry Maier Festival Park =

Location in Milwaukee, Wisconsin

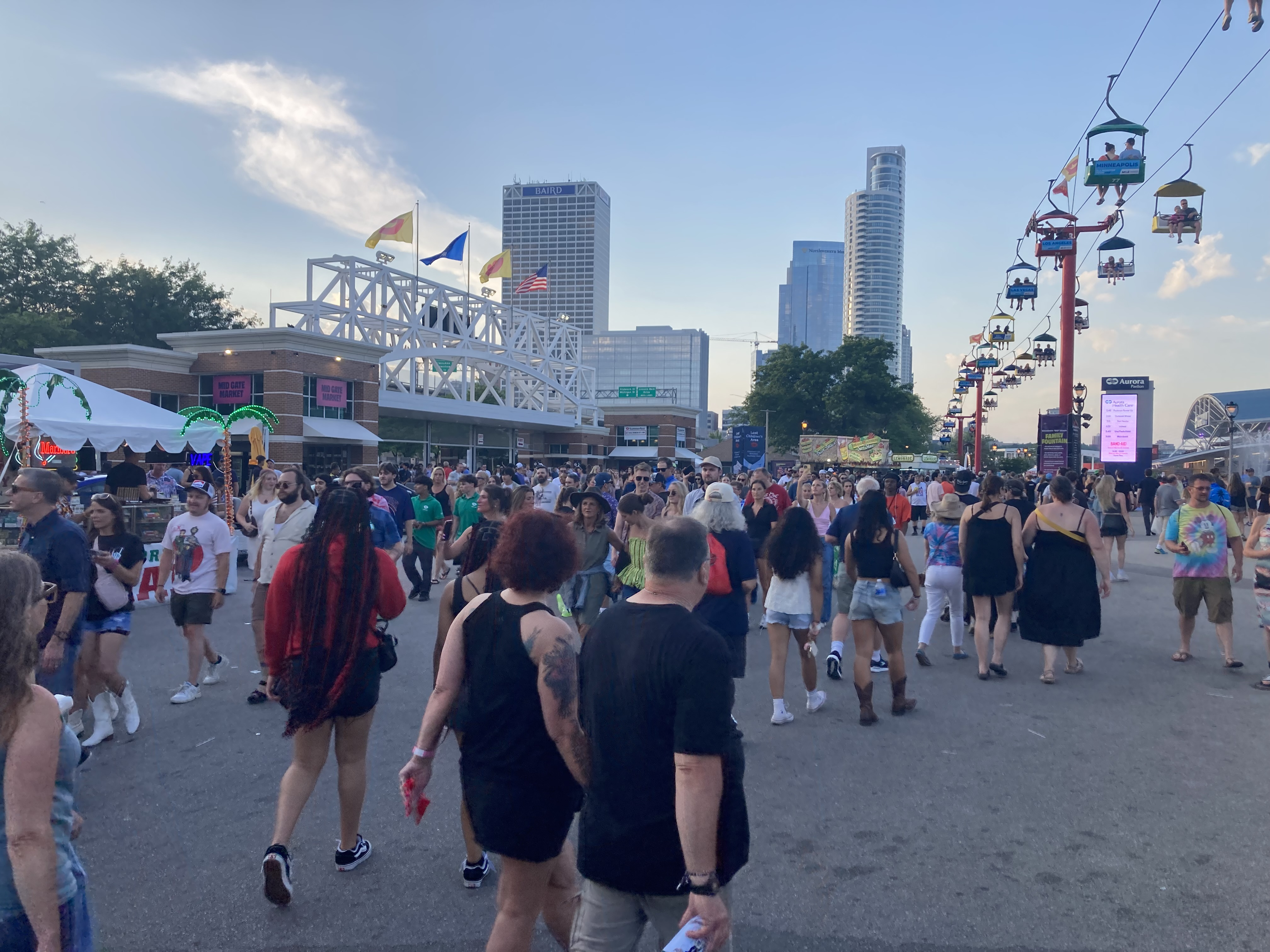
- Alternative names: Summerfest Grounds

General information
- Location: 200 North Harbor Drive; Milwaukee, Wisconsin
- Coordinates: 43°01′41″N 87°53′56″W
- Named for: Henry Maier
- Opened: 1970
- Client: Milwaukee World Festival, Inc.
- Owner: City of Milwaukee

Design and construction
- Known for: Summerfest

Other information
- Parking: Yes
- Public transit: MCTS

Website
- milwaukeeworldfestival.com

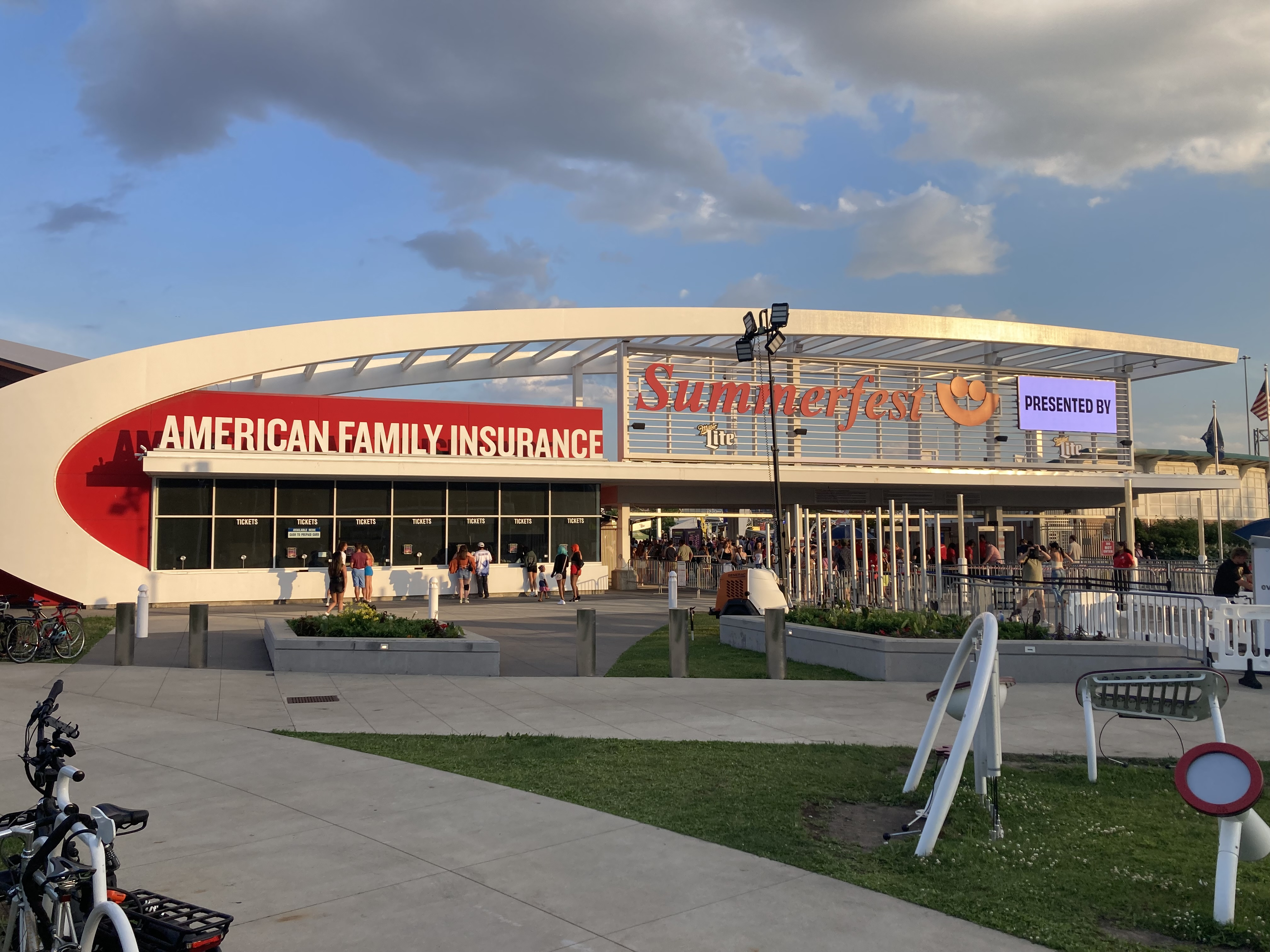
North entrance during Summerfest 2025

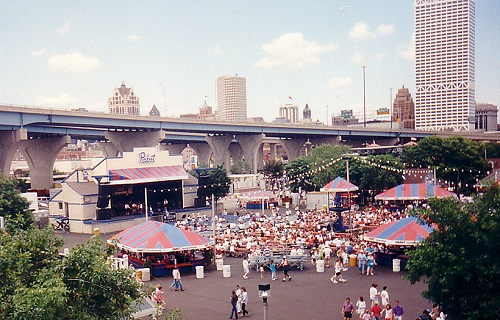
The Pabst Showcase located on the Henry W. Maier Festival Grounds during the 1994 Summerfest, with Downtown Milwaukee and Interstate 794 in the background.

Henry Maier Festival Park is a 75-acre festival park located in Milwaukee, Wisconsin on the shore of Lake Michigan and is the site of the annual Summerfest musical festival and the home of the American Family Insurance Amphitheater; because of its regular hosting of Summerfest, locals also call it the "Summerfest Grounds."

== History ==
=== Before Summerfest ===
In 1927 Maitland Airport (also the Milwaukee seaplane port) was opened. It was one of the city's first airstrips. The airport remained in operation for more than 20 years before it was replaced by a Nike missile installation, established during the height of 1950s Cold War tensions. The site was one of eight in the Greater Milwaukee area and hosted both the Nike Ajax and nuclear-capable Nike Hercules missiles as a means of last resort against a possible attack by the Soviet Union. The military installation, along with a radar station at Lake Park, remained in use until 1969 when the Army closed them in an effort to reduce costs.

The land was then sold to the city and became a top possible destination by Summerfest's early leaders, who worried for the fest's future after bad weather caused a poor turnout in its second year. Organizers believed that a centralized location was crucial, and the lakefront site appeared ideal.

In 1970, the Harbor Commission, which took ownership of the land from the Army, constructed a deal and began leasing the site to Summerfest for one dollar a year. The recently formed Summerfest quickly set up makeshift offices from the remaining barracks and the control building.

=== Summerfest ===
The history of the Henry Maier Festival Park starts with Summerfest in 1968. The music festival was created that year, and found some success, being held in 35 different locations. The next year, however, was inundated with horrific weather, forcing cancellation of the last day and ensuring financial losses for that year. In 1970 a central location was decided upon: an abandoned strip of land along the lakefront in the downtown area, which was the former Maitland Airport and served as a Nike missile site during the Cold War.

The early Summerfest Grounds consisted of little more than concrete blocks with wooden slabs placed on top to serve as stages, in the middle of a grassy, muddy field. Despite this, the central location was key to the festival's success, ensuring the existence and expansion of the grounds. Construction continued through the 1970s and 1980s, with the highlight of the creation of the Marcus Amphitheater, a 23,000 seat partially covered venue, in 1987.

== Festivals ==
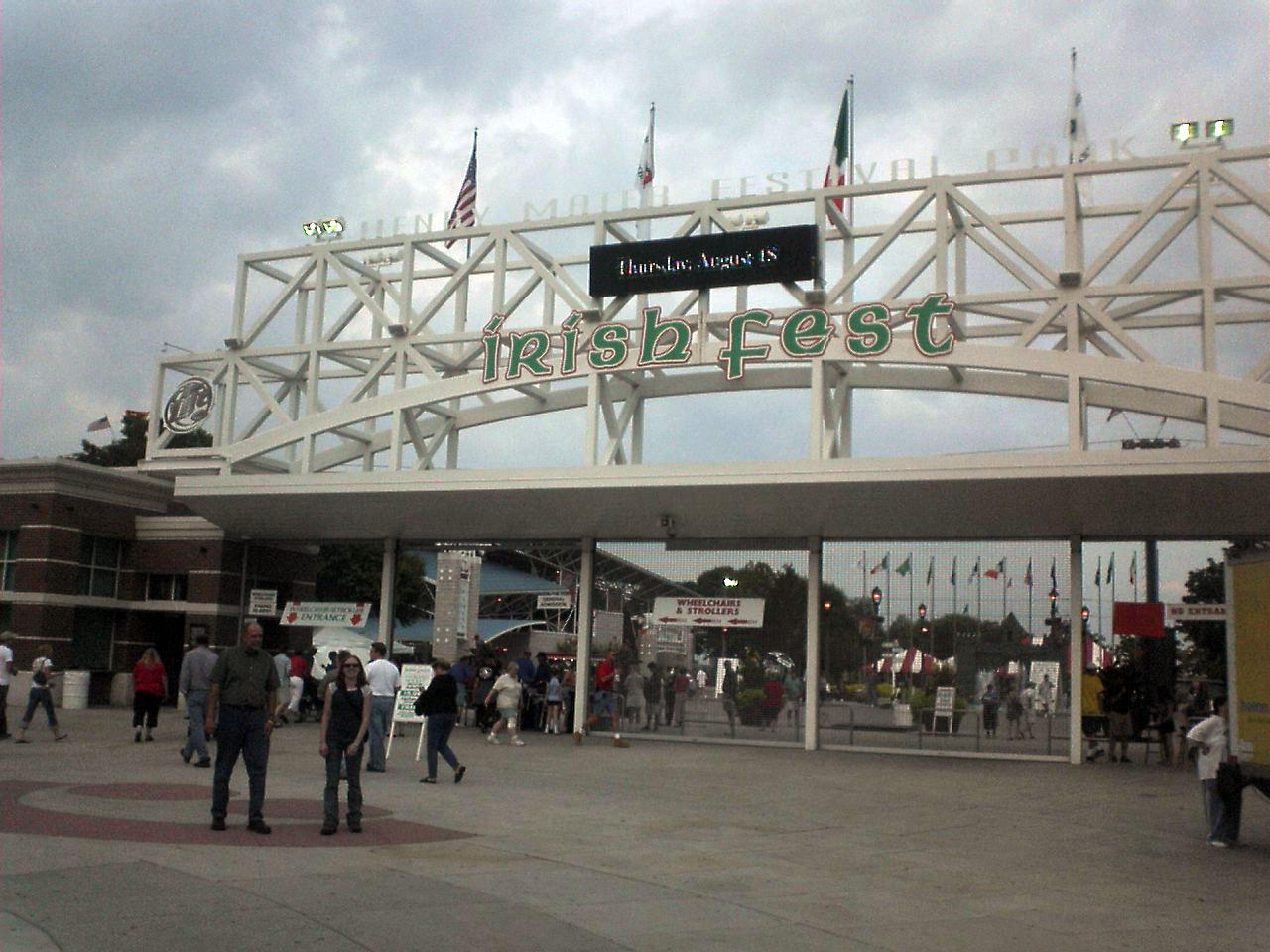
The Mid Gate of the Henry Maier Festival Park, during Milwaukee Irish Fest 2005.

Various ethnic and cultural festivals came to be held at the festival park beginning in the 1980s, as well as several run/walks for charity events.

- African World Festival
- Arab World Fest
- Asian Moon Festival
- Festa Italiana
- German Fest
- Indian Summer Festival
- Irish Fest
- Labor Fest
- Mexican Fiesta
- Polish Fest
- PrideFest

== See also ==
- Summerfest
- American Family Insurance Amphitheater
- Milwaukee Lakefront Marathon
