= American Family Insurance Amphitheater =

Amphitheater in the Henry Maier Festival Park in Milwaukee, Wisconsin

Coordinates: 43.027162°N 87.897613°W

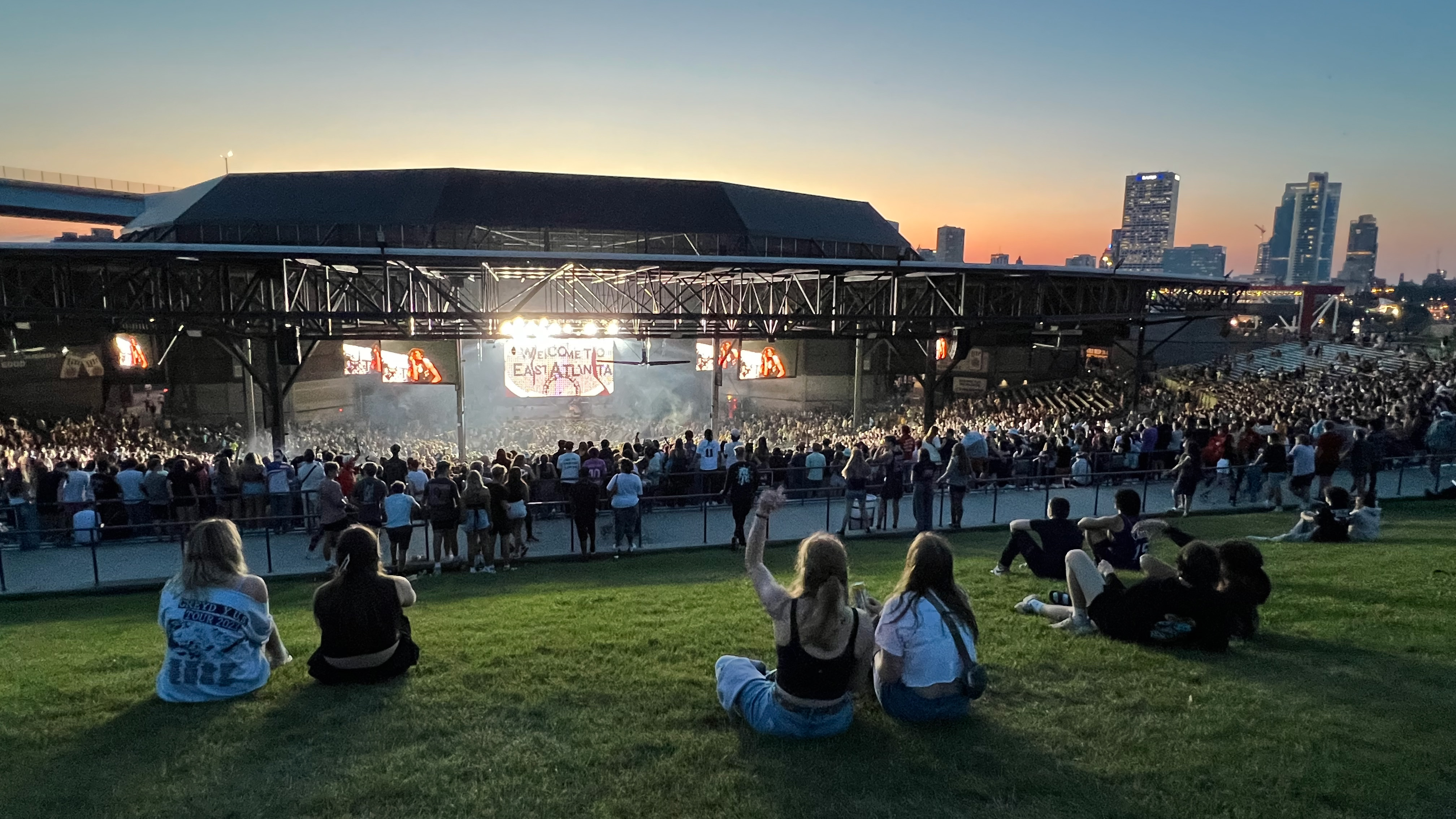
- Amphitheater in July 2024
- Interactive map of American Family Insurance Amphitheater
- Former names: Marcus Amphitheater (1987-2017)
- Address: 200 North Harbor Drive; Milwaukee, Wisconsin
- Location: Henry Maier Festival Park
- Capacity: 23,000
- Type: Amphitheater

Construction
- Opened: 1987
- Renovated: 2018-19

Website
- amfamamp.com

The American Family Insurance Amphitheater (formerly known as the Marcus Amphitheater) is an amphitheater on the south end of the Henry Maier Festival Park in Milwaukee, Wisconsin. The amphitheater serves as the venue for headlining acts performing at Summerfest. It also plays host to a variety of concerts and events during the spring, summer and fall.

== History ==
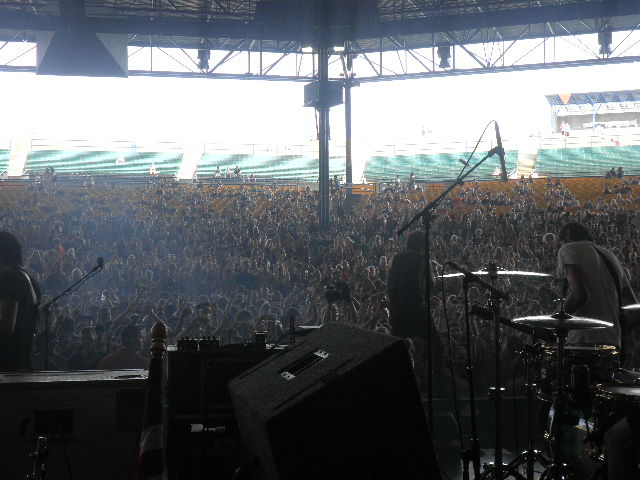
2012 concert

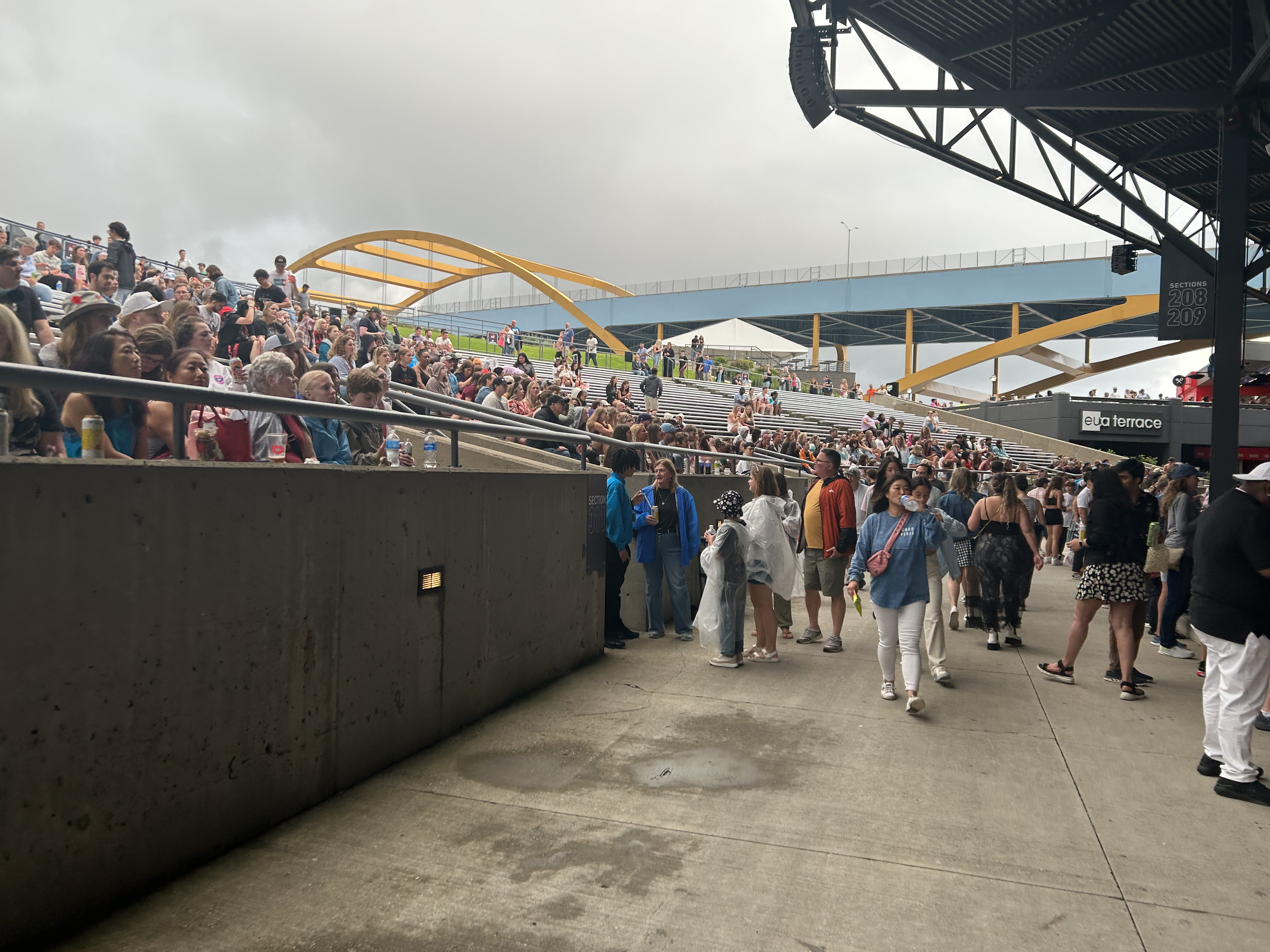
View of the adjacent Hoan Bridge from the venue

The Marcus Amphitheater was built after an extremely overcrowded Huey Lewis and the News concert in 1984, which drew 30,000 fans to a space suited for 15,000. The amphitheatre has a capacity of 23,000 (9,200 seats under pavilion, 7,000 reserved seats on lawn and 6,800 general admission seats). It was completed in 1987, with the principal contribution from the Marcus Corporation.

In September 2018, demolition began on the original Marcus Amphitheater which would be replaced with a new $50 million American Family Insurance Amphitheater.

== See also ==
- Summerfest
- Henry Maier Festival Park
- List of contemporary amphitheatres
