= Mariska Kramer =

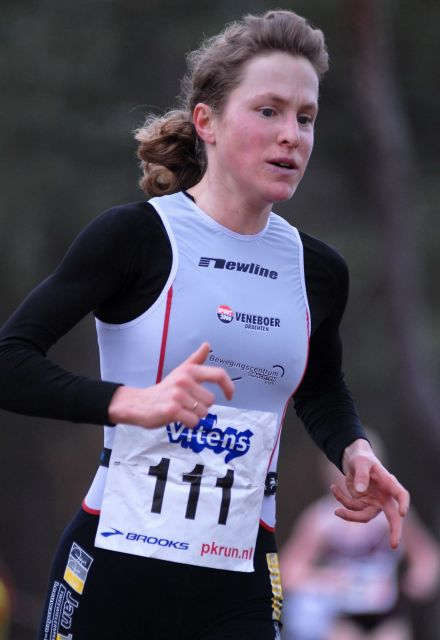
Kramer at the 2007 Sylvestercross race

Mariska Kramer-Postma (born 26 April 1974 in Twijzelerheide) is a Dutch triathlete, duathlete and long-distance runner. She was the 2006 Ironman France champion and won the Louisville leg of the 2008 Ironman World Championship series. She was the runner-up at the ITU Duathlon World Championships in 2008.

She won the Philadelphia Marathon in 2010 and 2011 (winning in a personal best time of 2:35:46 hours). She was fifth at the City-Pier-City Half Marathon in 2011, being the first Dutchwoman home in a personal best time of 1:14:24 hours.
