= Milwaukee Lakefront Marathon =

American road race

- Date: First Sunday in October
- Location: Milwaukee, Wisconsin
- Event type: Paved Road
- Distance: 26.2 miles (42.2 km)
- Primary sponsor: Badgerland Striders
- Established: 1973
- Course records: Women: Damaris Areba, 2:37:39 (2023); Men: Steve Benson, 2:14:09 (1981)
- Website: www.milwaukeelakefrontmarathon.org
- Participants: over 1600

The Milwaukee Lakefront Marathon is an annual marathon held in Milwaukee, Wisconsin, in the United States. It starts at the Italian Community Center on West Wisconsin Avenue in Milwaukee and finishes at Henry Maier Festival Park and has a total elevation gain of 626 feet (191 m). As of 2023, it is the largest marathon held in Wisconsin. The Milwaukee Lakefront Marathon is somewhat unique among American marathons because it does not have a corporate sponsor and is not for charity; instead it is organized by the Badgerland Striders running group on a "for runners, by runners" model.

In 2008, the Road Runners Club of America recognized the Milwaukee Lakefront Marathon as Road Race of the Year.

== Race history ==
The Wisconsin Mayfair Marathon, which started at Mayfair Mall, was established in 1972 and was the progenitor to what became the Lakefront Marathon. The 1972 Wisconsin Mayfair Marathon was not a marathon race, but instead was a fundraiser for the US Olympic team on a 0.125 miles (201 m) track set up in the mall's parking lot. In 1972, 1,724 participants ran 14,980 miles (24,110 km) between June 11 and 17, 1972. The 1973 Wisconsin Mayfair Marathon became a marathon race.

In 1982, the Badgerland Striders running group reconstituted the Wisconsin Mayfair Marathon as the Lakefront Marathon. The 1983 race was known as the Lite Beer Lakefront Marathon.

Chip timing was used for the first time at the Lakefront Marathon in 1999.

In 2005, the Badgerland Striders had to cap the number of participants for the first time limiting entries to 2,300.

Fauja Singh ran his 100th marathon at the Lakefront Marathon in 2008.

In 2009, pace groups were first a part of Lakefront Marathon to help runners meet their time goals. The same year, Wisconsin politicians Jim Sullivan, David Cullen, and Pedro Colón competed in the Lakefront Marathon. There was also controversy in the women's race that year when Cassie Peller, who ran 3:02:09, was disqualified for accepting outside aid by drinking water outside of official aid stations in violation of USATF rules. Peller admitted she took water from a young boy and was handed an unplanned water bottle by a friend around 19 miles (31 km), but claimed she didn't seek to have any unfair advantage. However, the second place finisher Jennifer Goebel was also disqualified for using an iPod in violation of USATF rules from 19 miles (31 km) to 21 miles (34 km) of the race. This elevated Corina Canitz, the third women's finisher, to be the winner with a time of 3:04:20; Canitz donated the $500 winner's award to a charity affiliated with Jenny Crain.

In 2010, the Lakefront Marathon was the Road Runners Club of America national marathon championship race. The same year, about 100 runners were obstructed by a train about 1.6 miles (2.6 km) into the race.

The marathon relay race at Lakefront Marathon ended in 2010. Race director Kristine Hinrichs explained the decision by saying the change helped focus on the marathon race.

In 2011, 62 runners tethered themselves together and ran the Lakefront Marathon with a finish time of 6 hours and 18 minutes to set the Guinness World Record for The Most People Linked Together To Complete A Marathon. The previous record was 54 runners. This was done as a fundraiser for elite athlete Jenny Crain, who was injured in a traffic accident, and raised at least $108,000. Crain joined "Team Jennipede" for the last 0.2 miles (320 m) of the race in her wheelchair.

Slight changes were made to the race course in 2011 to better show off views of Lake Michigan.

In 2022, the Lakefront Marathon was canceled due to permit issues. An unofficial marathon and half marathon called Not Lakefront Marathon took place on October 2, 2022, and 700 to 800 runners participated in it from 20 states.

Until 2023, the Lakefront Marathon was run on a point-to-point course from the Grafton High School in Grafton, Wisconsin, to Veteran's Park in Milwaukee, Wisconsin, on a course that was recognized for being flat and fast. The route change was necessitated by road construction on the original course. The new route has more elevation gain on the course including 125 feet (38 m) on the Hoan Bridge.

In 2024, the driver of a vehicle experienced a medical emergency and struck a marathon participant.

== Race weekend ==
The marathon and half marathon both start at 7 am.

== Past marathon results ==
Date	Men's winner	Time (h:m:s)	Women's winner	Time (h:m:s)
September 20, 1981	Steve Benson	2:14:09	Mary Bange	2:55:31
October 7, 1990	Tom Antczak	2:25:38	Kris Clark-Setnes	3:04:56
October 13, 1991	Tim Renzelmann	2:22:22	Linda Walker	2:43:15
October 10, 1992	Lee Zubrod	2:26:03	Debbie Revolta	2:51:39
October 11, 1993	Randy Damkot	2:29:00	Liz Krznarich	2:56:43
October 9, 1994	Mitchell Craib	2:25:27	Ann Schaefers	2:47:31
October 8, 1995	Randy Damkot	2:22:35	Jane Murphy	2:44:31
October 13, 1996	Rick Stefanovic	2:33:52	Kathleen Green	2:58:13
October 12, 1997	Brian Pahnke	2:33:08	Jennifer Holzem	2:58:47
October 11, 1998	Randy Damkot	2:25:25	Mary Peckarsky	2:49:48
October 10, 1999	Dan Held	2:23:22	Keri Wells	2:49:49
October 8, 2000	Randy Damkot	2:26:07	Janeth Salazar-Ohst	2:52:24
October 14, 2001	Randy Damkot	2:29:04	Kathy Waldron	3:01:28
October 6, 2002	Rick Stefanovic	2:41:04	Kit McCaffrey	3:05.26
October 5, 2003	Chris Roberdeau	2:26:39	Rebecca Ward	2:56.46
October 3, 2004	Shane Carr	2:35:34	Aaron Clark	2:58:30
October 2, 2005	Bob Cisler	2:32:22	Meghan Macardy	3:03:06
October 1, 2006	Paul Laeseke	2:32:26	Rebecca Suehring	2:53:29
October 7, 2007	Matthew Lavine	2:37:31	Corina Canitz	3:01:02
October 5, 2008	Brent Alexander	2:28:24	Corina Canitz	3:00:48
October 4, 2009	Ryan Meissen	2:24.53	Corina Canitz	3:04:20
October 3, 2010	Scott Jansky	2:31:41	Nacole Fredrickson	3:01:39
October 2, 2011	Nick Szczech	2:22:17	Amber Druien	2:54:15
October 7, 2012	Paul Zdroik	2:27:08	Jacqui Aubert	2:55:06
October 6, 2013	Ryan Meissen	2:28:23	Melissa Burkart	2:45:30
October 5, 2014	Nick End	2:27:38	Melissa Gacek	2:43:41
October 4, 2015	Kyle Fraser	2:27:38	Melissa Burkart	2:43:41
October 2, 2016	Dave Eckhart	2:27:22	Brooke Slayman	2:51:17
October 1, 2017	Matt Borneman	2:31:44	Jenny Zwagerman	2:54:11
October 7, 2018	David Luy	2:21:24	Kameron Burmeister	2:45:21
October 6, 2019	Sammy Kibet Rotich	2:17:10	Liz Berkholtz	2:45:27
October 4, 2020	canceled due to coronavirus pandemic			
October 3, 2021	Matt Barrett	2:22:35	Samantha Slattery	2:48:00
October 1, 2022	canceled due to inability to secure permits			
October 1, 2023	Seth Massot	2:24:51	Damaris Areba	2:37:39
October 6, 2024	Abraham Kipkemei	2:21:53	Alexis Mather	2:46:42
