= Sammy Kibet Rotich =

Kenyan long-distance runner

Sammy Kibet Rotich (born 1980) is a male long-distance runner from Kenya.

== Achievements ==
| Year | Competition | Venue | Position | Event | Notes |
Representing Kenya
| 2006 | Enschede Marathon | Enschede, Netherlands | 1st | Marathon | 2:12:06 |
| 2006 | Lausanne Marathon | Lausanne, Switzerland | 1st | Marathon | 2:14:39 |
| 2008 | Riga Marathon | Riga, Latvia | 1st | Marathon | 2:16:42 |
| 2008 | Kosice Marathon | Kosice, Slovakia | 4th | Marathon | 2:12:31 |
| 2010 | Belgrade Marathon | Belgrade, Serbia | 4th | Marathon | 2:19:29 |
| 2019 | Milwaukee Lakefront Marathon | Milwaukee, Wisconsin, United States | 1st | Marathon | 2:17:10 |
| 2022 | Austin Marathon | Austin, United States | 1st | Marathon | 2:14:24 |
