= Summerfest =

Annual music festival in Wisconsin, United States

- Genre: Alternative, Americana, bluegrass, blues, contemporary, country, electronic, folk, funk, gospel, hard rock, metal, hip hop, indie, jam band, jazz, pop, R&B, reggae, rock, zydeco
- Dates: 3 Weekends (9 days)
- Locations: Henry Maier Festival Park; Milwaukee, Wisconsin, United States
- Years active: 1968–2019, 2021–present
- Attendance: 555,925 (2024)
- Website: summerfest.com

Summerfest is an annual music festival held in downtown Milwaukee, Wisconsin. First held in 1968, Summerfest is located at Henry Maier Festival Park, adjacent to Lake Michigan and Milwaukee's Third Ward business district. Summerfest is known as "The World's Largest Music Festival", a title certified by Guinness World Records in 1999.

The 75 acre (30 ha) park hosts Summerfest from late June until early July (including the Fourth of July). It was announced in 2021 that the festival would move to a three weekend schedule to allow for more Friday and Saturday event days. The performers include local and nationally known music talent from various genres, performing throughout the grounds from noon to midnight, including the 23,000-capacity American Family Insurance Amphitheater. Since 2004, nearly $150 million has been invested into Henry Maier Festival Park, including permanent stages, bars, production space, VIP amenities and other infrastructure.

Summerfest also showcases a wide variety of food from many Milwaukee-area restaurants. Other Summerfest attractions include shopping vendors, fireworks (including "The Big Bang" on opening night), family activities, and more. Summerfest is operated by Milwaukee World Festival, Inc. a non-profit organization, which is governed by a volunteer board of directors.

In its 50+ year history, Summerfest has hosted a variety of well-known artists, including Paul McCartney, the Rolling Stones, Aretha Franklin, The Jackson 5, Eric Clapton, Tina Turner, Metallica, Whitney Houston, Dolly Parton, Johnny Cash, Stevie Wonder, Kenny Chesney, Aerosmith, Cher, Bruno Mars, Arctic Monkeys, Lady Gaga, Usher, and Dave Matthews Band.

In 2024, Summerfest welcomed SZA, Tyler Childers, Lil Uzi Vert, Maroon 5, Kane Brown, AJR, Ivan Cornejo, Goo Goo Dolls, Bryson Tiller, Cold War Kids, Mario, Alison Wonderland, En Vogue, The All-American Rejects, REO Speedwagon, Ethel Cain, Key Glock, and many others.

Don Smiley served as president and chief executive officer of Summerfest from 2004 until his retirement in December 2023. He was succeeded in both roles by Sarah Smith Pancheri.

== Community engagement ==
Aligned with Summerfest's non-profit mission, the festival made significant contributions to the community in 2024, providing over 26,000 meals for Wisconsinites struggling with food insecurity through Feeding America Eastern Wisconsin, over $13,500 worth of hygiene products donated to Milwaukee and Waukesha County schools through the United Way, and over 4,000 books for Next Door's community literacy initiatives. The festival also integrated over 70 local community organizations into the festival through performances and events such as Direct Supply Seniorfest Day and Children's Fest Day presented by Shorewest, Realtors.

=== Economic impact ===
In 2023, Summerfest commissioned an economic impact study through Oxford Economics which claimed that Summerfest generated a total economic impact of $160.3 million for the city of Milwaukee and supported 3,400 total part-time and full-time jobs. For the state of Wisconsin, Summerfest generated $188.7 million in economic impact, along with $14.4 million in state and local taxes.

=== Admission promotions ===
Summerfest offers ways to access the festival via free or discounted admission while giving back to the community. On select days, fans are encouraged to donate non-perishable food items, hygiene supplies, or books to get free admission into the festival.

=== Let the Music Play grant program ===
Since its inception in 2019, the Let the Music Play grant program has supported over 40 organizations and hundreds of music students annually. The program is open to non-profit organizations and schools through music-based programming and represent the variety of music-based activities taking place in the greater Milwaukee community.

=== BMO Empower grant program ===
The BMO EMpower grant program is a long-term platform that helps support minority-owned businesses through BMO's partnership with Summerfest.

These grants are part of BMO's EMpower program, a more than $40 billion commitment to address key barriers faced by minority businesses, communities and families in the United States. In 2024, 11 minority small business owners received funding, along with business banking-related educational opportunities, to support their work as vendors during Summerfest.

=== Power Up with Purpose ===
The "Power Up with Purpose" program allows fans the opportunity to gain front row, pit access to Generac Power Stage headliners during the festival, while supporting Veterans Community Project in Milwaukee, WI.All proceeds will benefit Veterans Community Project (VCP), a nationally recognized nonprofit organization dedicated to ending Veteran homelessness.

== History ==
Summerfest was conceived in the 1960s by then-mayor Henry W. Maier. Inspired by his visit to Oktoberfest in Munich, Germany, Maier envisioned a similar ethnic-themed festival in Milwaukee, and in 1962 formed a panel of business and civic leaders to study the feasibility of a large-scale summer festival. By the middle of the decade, the panel drew up a proposal for a 10-day multi-event festival with the proposed name of "Milwaukee World Festival," which was changed briefly in 1966 to "Juli Spaß" (German for "July Fun") and then to "Summerfest".

The inaugural Summerfest was held in July 1968 at 35 different locations throughout the city (including Milwaukee County Stadium and Milwaukee Arena), and its events ranged from concerts to a film festival, an air show, and even a pageant. The first Summerfest, produced by Dee Robb and Con Merten was regarded as a success; the second event in 1969, was less successful, as it was plagued by additional venues, inclement weather, and severe financial debt.

In 1970, a permanent central location was decided upon, and Summerfest moved to a former Nike missile site on the lakefront, where it continues to be held to this day. Also that year, Summerfest introduced its red "smiley face" logo, an insignia that has become synonymous with the event. The logo was designed by local graphic artists Noel Spangler and Richard D. Grant.

It was also in 1970 that Henry Jordan, former Green Bay Packers defensive tackle, became executive director of Summerfest, a title he held during the event's early years until his death in 1977. After a few other businessmen were hired by the board for the executive director's job, Elizabeth "Bo" Black, who was formerly Henry Jordan's secretary, became executive director in 1984 after a ten-year lobbying effort.

The event has not been without its controversy. On December 9, 2002, Lee Gates commented in the Milwaukee Journal Sentinel about the lack of opportunity to play at Summerfest. "I don't get the credit I deserve here. I've been playing 50-something years. There's discrimination at Summerfest. I shouldn't need to have a CD out to be paid $700 at Summerfest. If they want you to have CDs, they should pay you like they pay the professional people."

Summerfest celebrated its 40th anniversary in 2007. The event's history was the subject of "Summerfest Stories", a documentary that aired in June 2007 on Milwaukee Public Television.

In 2015, Milwaukee World Festival, Inc and ReverbNation announced a three-year agreement to use the online service as an audition to give musicians a chance to perform. Summerfest wanted to provide an opportunity for performers to get a chance to be one of the 800+ acts and allow new talent to be seen by over 900,000 people that attend.

2020 saw the COVID-19 pandemic as grounds for scrapping the concert part & moving others online.

=== Attendance ===
Summerfest attendance since 1995

Summerfest attendance peaked in 2001 (12 days over 2 weeks) at 1,000,563 attendees. In 2010 Summerfest officials announced a new 11-day schedule for the 2011 festival. Summerfest was closed in 2020 due to the COVID-19 pandemic. In 2021 (409,386 attendees), the event was revised to 9 days (3 weekends) instead of 11 days (over 2 weeks), and it occurred in September rather than during the summer months. Summerfest returned to the June/July summer months in 2022 (445,611 attendees), but continued the 3 weekend format. Citing analyzed available data, patron surveys and the event landscape Milwaukee World Festival ultimately determined the best possible path forward for Summerfest was to transition to a 3 weekend format.

The festival reported 555,925 fans during Summerfest 2024, despite rain impacting six of the nine festival days (2024 saw the most rain since Summerfest 2000). In fulfillment of Milwaukee World Festival, Inc.'s (MWF) nonprofit mission, 21% of those patrons who attended the festival gained access via one of the 14 free admission promotions.

== Stages and other venues ==
The Summerfest grounds include seven permanent stages and two pavilions that can be converted to stages (Johnson Controls World Sound Stage and the South Pavilion).

Stage name	Capacity	Photo	Notes
American Family Insurance Amphitheater	23,000		Previously known as the "Marcus Amphitheater", it was built after an extremely overcrowded concert in 1984 to carry crowds of 25,000 fans during concerts. It was completed in 1987, with the principal contribution from the Marcus Corporation. In 2017 the announcement of a new Amphitheater was made in conjunction with American Family Insurance's new sponsorship renaming the venue American Family Insurance Amphitheater. In the fall of 2018, Milwaukee World Festival, Inc. started construction on the new American Family Insurance Amphitheater. In 2019, the roof was raised from 39 feet to 65 feet. The backstage building was also rebuilt, offering new artist amenities. The second phase of the $51.3 million renovation was completed in 2020 and included a new seating bowl configuration and raised stage to allow for better sightlines, enhanced accessibility, expanded concourses, new video screens, updated food and beverage operations, new VIP hospitality areas, and additional restrooms.
BMO Pavilion	10,000		Designed and built in 2012 the venue features a wave-inspired roof, which covers more than an acre of space (approximately 50,000 square feet) and provides protection from the elements for approximately 5,000 guests with high-quality permanent seats and bleachers with backrests and another 5,000 guests in its standing room viewing area adjacent to the venue and outside of the roofline.
Miller Lite Oasis	11,400		Completed in 2006. The largest stage inside the Summerfest grounds that is accessible without having to pay extra for the American Family Insurance Amphitheatre headliner. A renovation of the Miller Lite Oasis stage was completed for Summerfest 2017. Additions to the stage footprint include the "longest bar on the grounds", fresh hops growing alongside the stage, a second VIP deck, and handicap accessibility near the front of the stage.
Generac Power Stage	11,000		Previously known as Harley-Davidson Roadhouse, it was renovated in 2008. In 2021, it was renovated and renamed Generac Power Stage. This space offers bleacher seats and standing room in the back for visitors to listen and watch artists of their choice.
Briggs and Stratton Big Backyard	8,600		In 2011, a renovated Briggs & Stratton Big Backyard stage opened. Its capacity ranges from 6,000 to 8,000.
U.S. Cellular Connection Stage	5,700		Renovated in 2018, the U.S. Cellular Connection Stage provides a view of Lake Michigan, a 25-foot LED screen – the largest screen on the grounds, benches with charging amenities along the lakefront, a new bar area, and improved walkway access for fans. iHeartMedia, including FM 106.1, is the media partner of the stage.
Uline Warehouse	7,300		Located on the north end of the grounds, the Uline Warehouse stage was rebuilt in 2019. The stage features a mix of acts from various genres including classic rock, country, hard rock, blues, and jam.
Aurora Pavilion	3,200		Previously named the Johnson Controls World Sound Stage the stage was renamed in 2024 to the Aurora Pavilion after a new partnership with Aurora Health Care. The new stage sponsorship included an upgraded venue – the Aurora Pavilion – at Henry Maier Festival Park, which will create a gathering place for cultural programming including free events and concerts.
Northwestern Mutual Community Park			Located on the lakefront in the middle of the grounds, families can enjoy children-focused entertainment and activities during Summerfest. Performances from magicians, dance groups, jugglers, puppets and more can be enjoyed throughout the day. The area also includes a large playground area, greenspace, as well as conveniently located bathrooms, sensory rooms, and nursing mothers stations. The Northwestern Mutual Community Park offers inclusive and accessible play for children ages 2 to 12 years of age, including those who may experience a variety of challenges.
Summerville - presented by Johnsonville			Previously known as The Klement's Sausage and Beer Garden stage, located on the North End of Henry Maier Festival Park. The stage was renamed Summerville - by Johnsonville after it was announced that the Sheboygan-Falls-based and family-owned Johnsonville was a new sponsor of Summerfest.
Gruber Law Offices Sportszone			Located near the Mid Gate along the lakefront it is the ultimate place for sports fans. The area offers interactive daily programming including sports demonstrations from professional teams, children's games, and health and fitness activities.
American Family Insurance House			The American Family Insurance House is the most exclusive venue at Summerfest and a must-see destination for all concertgoers. Free to enter with only a 300-person limit, the American Family Insurance House stage at Summerfest brings music performances from Milwaukee's top DJs and some of the largest names in music.
JoJo's Martini Lounge			Located near the American Family Insurance Amphitheater, JoJo's Martini Lounge with Miller Lite is a popular hot spot, offering JoJo's specialty martinis and great local entertainment. JoJo's became the South Party pavilion in 2021.
South Pavilion	2,700		Hosts no permanent stage. During the festival it is a popular hot spot, that hosts great local entertainment.
Other	N/A		Other venues include the Tiki Hut, the Ground Floor Stage, the 2nd Floor Stage, and the "DIY" Rebel Stage.

== Concert history year by year ==
Summerfest has been most famous for its music since the first festival in 1968, when acts such as Ronnie Dove, The New Colony Six, The Robbs and Up With People performed. Since then, musical acts from Bob Dylan, The Jackson 5, Frank Sinatra, Prince, Whitney Houston, Janet Jackson, The Jonas Brothers, Fleetwood Mac, Maroon 5, Fun, Britney Spears, Stevie Ray Vaughan, Cher, Tina Turner, and James Taylor to Christina Aguilera, Diana Ross, Roy Orbison, Liza Minnelli, Kanye West, Kid Cudi, Stevie Wonder, Mary J. Blige, Wiz Khalifa, Imagine Dragons, Nine Inch Nails, The Ramones, Billie Eilish, Willie Nelson, The Rolling Stones, and Paul McCartney have graced the Summerfest stages. Acts with Milwaukee and Wisconsin connections have had a prominent history at Summerfest, most notably the BoDeans, The Gufs, Danny Gokey, and Violent Femmes.

The concerts have been mostly civil events, with two notable exceptions. In 1970, a performance by the late-arriving Sly & the Family Stone nearly resulted in a riot. In 1973, a performance by Humble Pie & Jo Jo Gunne resulted in a riot, a bonfire, and about 300 arrests. As a result of the latter concert, organizers shied away from rock bands for several years, and established guidelines for "family-friendly" acts and a ban on alcohol brought in by patrons. This was properly managed when Henry Jordan found the experienced managers, Joel Gast and Lou Volpano, to manage entertainment in-house, eliminating Cleveland's Jules Belkin Promotions, who were hired by Board Members Bernie Samson and Steve Marcus. Also at that time local manager Volpano was hired specifically to improve production and book international superstars on what was a mere Local Rock Stage, where then the Ramones, UFO, and Judas Priest headlined

Live comedy acts have also been a part of Summerfest's history, even before a regular "Comedy Showcase" was first established in 1975. Bob Hope was the main headliner at Summerfest 1969, performing two shows at Milwaukee County Stadium. George Carlin (opening for Arlo Guthrie) performed his "Seven Words You Can Never Say on Television" routine at the 1972 event and was subsequently arrested for violating obscenity laws. Prior to his arrest, he discarded a bag of cocaine to avoid further imprisonment.

Since 1975, comedy acts ranging from David Brenner and Henny Youngman to Jay Leno and Jon Stewart have performed at the event. Sandra Bernhard did TV and radio promos for its 1986 season when she was a performer there. Lewis Black has also become a frequent performer at Summerfest.

=== Recent performers ===
Year	Performers
2015	Linkin Park, Keith Urban, Ed Sheeran, Florida Georgia Line, Zac Brown Band, Kings of Leon, Kendrick Lamar, The Rolling Stones, Stevie Wonder, Neil Young, Carrie Underwood, and The Avett Brothers.
2016	Selena Gomez, Pitbull, Blake Shelton, Chris Stapleton, Tim McGraw, Blink-182, Def Leppard, REO Speedwagon, Luke Bryan, Paul McCartney, Weezer, Panic! at the Disco, Sting, and Peter Gabriel.
2017	Red Hot Chili Peppers, Luke Bryan, Brothers Osborne, Paul Simon, Zac Brown Band, P!nk, The Chainsmokers, Tom Petty & The Heartbreakers, Chris Stapleton, Dierks Bentley, Jon Pardi, Cole Swindell, Future, Big Sean, Migos, Willie Nelson, Bob Dylan, Sheryl Crow, Margo Price, Promise of the Real, Steve Miller Band, A Day to Remember, Atmosphere, Walk the Moon, Shinedown, Andy Grammer, Third Eye Blind, The Band Perry, Philip Phillips, Collective Soul, Blues Traveler, Spin Doctors, Tonic, Soul Asylum, Los Lonely Boys, Peter Frampton, Huey Lewis & the News, Toto, REO Speedwagon, and John Waite.
2018	James Taylor & Bonnie Raitt, Halsey & Logic, Arcade Fire, Florida Georgia Line, Dave Matthews Band, Blake Shelton, J. Cole, Journey and Def Leppard, The Weeknd, and Imagine Dragons, A Flock Of Seagulls, Shawn Mendes with Charli XCX, Marshmello, Lil Uzi Vert, Steven Tyler, Kesha, Jason Isbell and the 400 unit, Aless, The Flaming Lips, Pixies, Greta Van Fleet, Foster the People, Billie Currington, Janelle Monáe, Jethro Tull, Tory Lanez, Kip Moore, Kaleo, The Neighbourhood, Rachel Platten, Louis the Child, PHANTOGRAM, Cheap Trick, Grizzly Bear, Spoon, Borns, Yonder Mountain String Band, The Fray, Buddy Guy, Kane Brown, Slightly Stoopid, Maze featuring Frankie Beverly, Cheat Codes, Chromeo, O.A.R., Jon Batist with The Dap-Kings, GoldLink, Machine Gun Kelly, Timeflies, Nelly, Brett Young, Benjamin Booker, Capital Cities, Judah & The Lion, Victor Manuelle, George Thorogood & The Destroyers, Social Distortion, Gavin DeGraw, Echosmith, Rick Springfield, and more.
2019	Thomas Rhett with Dustin Lynch & Russell Dickerson, Willie Nelson & Family, Phil Lesh and Friends, The Avett Brothers, Counting Crows, Alison Krauss, Dawes, Trapper Schoepp, Jason Aldean with Kane Brown and Carly Pearce, Bon Iver with Lord Huron & Julien Baker, Zac Brown Band with Drake White, Lionel Richie with Michael McDonald, Jennifer Lopez, The Killers with Death Cab for Cutie, Lil Wayne, Billie Eilish, Snoop Dogg, ScHoolboy Q, Chicago, Foreigner, Loverboy, Styx, 38 Special, Jason Mraz, Walk the Moon, Third Eye Blind, Jimmy Eat World, 3 Doors Down, X Ambassadors, Switchfoot, Skillet, and Collective Soul, Brandi Carlile, Cole Swindell, The Head and the Heart, The Lonely Island, A Boogie Wit Da Hoodie, Lizzo, The National, Steve Aoki, Brothers Osborne, Young The Giant, Sublime with Rome, Courtney Barnett, Quinn XCII, Atmosphere, T-Pain, Vic Mensa, Taking Back Sunday, Rodrigo y Gabriela, Dashboard Confessional, Judah & the Lion, Catfish and the Bottleman, Chaka Khan, Frenship, Chris Janson, Elle King, Gryffin, Dispatch, Chase Rice, August Burns Red, St. Paul and the Broken Bones, Hanson, LANCO, Daya, Chelsea Cutler, lovelytheband, Chris Robinson Brotherhood, Semisonic, COIN, La Sonora Poncena, The Roots, Matoma, Neon Trees, Bone Thugs-n-Harmony, Lake Street Dive, Ludacris, Los Lonely Boys, Jimmy Allen, and more.
2021	Luke Bryan with Dylan Scott, REO Speedwagon, T-Pain, Chance the Rapper with 24kGoldn and Teezo Touchdown, Leon Bridges, Berlin, Night Ranger, Falling in Reverse, Better Than Ezra, Twenty One Pilots, Styx, Shaggy, Rise Against, Flo Rida, Vince Neil, Chris Stapleton with Sheryl Crow, Joan Jett DJ Jazzy Jeff, Everclear, George Thorogood, Zac Brown Band with Gabby Barrett, Goo Goo Dolls, Jefferson Starship, O.A.R., G-Eazy, The Sugarhill Gang, Nelly, Jesse McCartney, Dave Chappelle, Kesha, Manchester Orchestra, Toad the Wet Sprocket, 311, ZZ Top, Living Colour, Megan Thee Stallion with Polo G, Dropkick Murphys, Fitz and the Tantrums, Diplo, Spin Doctors, Ludacris, Miley Cyrus with Wiz Khalifa, Charlie Wilson, Psychedelic Furs, Run the Jewels, Guns N' Roses with Mammoth WVH, Black Pumas, Flaming Lips, Sheila E.
2022	Jason Aldean with Gabby Barrett and John Morgan, Big Boi, Pop Evil, Steve Aoki, Barenaked Ladies, Modest Mouse, Steve Miller Band, Violent Femmes, Dillon Francis, Lita Ford, Lil Wayne with Wiz Khalifa and Wu-Tang Clan, Disturbed with Lamb of God, Chevelle, and New Medicine, The Fixx, Todd Rundgren, Machine Gun Kelly with Avril Lavigne and Iann Dior, Stone Temple Pilots, Alessia Cara, Howard Jones, Modern English, 2 Chainz, Blue Öyster Cult, Halsey with The Marías and Abby Roberts, Third Eye Blind, KC and the Sunshine Band, Village People, Taking Back Sunday, Lupe Fiasco, Commodores, Rod Stewart with Cheap Trick, John Fogerty, Boyz II Men, Backstreet Boys, Charli XCX, The Black Crowes, A Flock of Seagulls, Thomas Rhett, Sister Hazel, Rick Springfield, For King & Country, Dante Bowe.
2023	Eric Church with Elle King, Zac Brown Band, James Taylor with Sheryl Crow, Dave Matthews Band, Odesza, A Boogie Wit da Hoodie with Trippie Redd and City Girls, Zach Bryan, Imagine Dragons with AJR.
2024	Kane Brown with Kameron Marlowe and Nightly, Mötley Crüe with Buckcherry and Seether, Tyler Childers with S.G. Goodman and Adeem the Artist, Keith Urban with Needtobreathe and Alana Springsteen, AJR with Carly Rae Jepsen and Mxmtoon, Maroon 5 with Dasha, Lil Uzi Vert with Lil Yachty, JID, Rico Nasty, and Lihtz.

=== Opening headliners ===
Year	Headliner	Notes
1968	George Jessel	
1969	Dolly Parton	
1970	Sly and the Family Stone	
1971	Mountain	
1972	The Doors	Sans Jim Morrison, who died in 1971.
1973	Steve Miller Band	
1974	Johnny Cash	
1975	The Beach Boys	
1976	The Band	
1977	Willie Nelson	
1978	Grateful Dead	Rained out—they never played nor traveled to the fest.
1979	Charles Aznavour and Jane Olivor	
1980	Kenny Loggins and Jim Messina	
1981	George Thorogood and The Destroyers	
1982	Santana	
1983	Eric Clapton	
1984	Huey Lewis and the News	
1985	Bryan Adams	
1986	The Go-Go's and INXS	
1987	Paul Simon	
1988	Sting	
1989	Richard Belzer	
1989	Rod Stewart	
1990	Cher	
1991	Whitney Houston	
1992	Metallica	
1993	Bon Jovi	
1994	Janet Jackson	
1995	Pearl Jam	
1996	Alanis Morissette	
1997	Dave Matthews Band	
1998	Shania Twain	
1999	Paul Simon and Bob Dylan	
2000	Britney Spears	
2001	Destiny's Child	
2002	Nine Inch Nails	
2003	Kenny Chesney and Keith Urban	
2004	Prince	
2005	John Mellencamp	
2006	Tom Petty and the Heartbreakers and Pearl Jam	
2007	Steely Dan	
2008	Stevie Wonder	
2009	Bon Jovi and Lynyrd Skynyrd	
2010	Tim McGraw	
2011	Peter Gabriel	
2012	Rascal Flatts and Lady Antebellum	
2013	The Avett Brothers and Violent Femmes	
2014	Bruno Mars and Lady Gaga	
2015	Florida Georgia Line and The Rolling Stones	
2016	Selena Gomez	
2017	Red Hot Chili Peppers	
2018	Imagine Dragons	
2019	Jennifer Lopez	
2020	None	Cancelled due to the COVID-19 pandemic
2021	Fall Out Boy, Green Day, and Weezer with KennyHoopla	
2022	Jason Aldean	
2023	Eric Church with Elle King	

== See also ==
- Henry Maier Festival Park
- List of historic rock festivals
