= List of marathon races in North America =

The following is a list of marathon races in North America.

== Legend ==
Symbol/Column	Description
**Bold**	Bold faced races are included in the World Marathon Majors
	Platinum
	Gold
	Elite
	Label
(year)	Defunct

== Race list ==
Label of races updated as 2026 World Athletics Label Road Races.

Name	City	Country	Month* _{*Last race was held}	Inception	Ref	Link
Adirondack Marathon	Schroon, New York	United States	September	1997		
Akron Marathon	Akron, Ohio	United States	September	2004		
Atlanta Marathon	Hampton, Georgia	United States	March	2007		
Atlantic City Marathon	Atlantic City, New Jersey	United States	October	1960		
Austin Marathon	Austin, Texas	United States	February	1992		
Avenue of the Giants Marathon	Humboldt County, California	United States	May	1972		
Baltimore Marathon	Baltimore, Maryland	United States	October	2001		
Bataan Memorial Death March	White Sands Missile Range, New Mexico	United States	March	1989		
Bay of Fundy International Marathon	Lubec, Maine	United States; Canada	June	2013		
Baystate Marathon	Lowell, Massachusetts	United States	October	1990		
Bemidji Blue Ox Marathon	Bemidji, Minnesota	United States	October	2013		
Big Sur International Marathon	Carmel, California	United States	April	1986		
Blue Nose Marathon	Halifax, Nova Scotia	Canada	May	2004		
Blue Ridge Marathon on the Parkway	Roanoke, Virginia	United States	April	2010		
**Boston Marathon**	Hopkinton to Boston, Massachusetts	United States	April	1897		
Breast Cancer Marathon	Jacksonville Beach, Florida	United States	February	2008		
Calgary Marathon	Calgary, Alberta	Canada	May	1963		
California International Marathon	Folsom to Sacramento, California	United States	December	1983		
Cape Cod Marathon	Falmouth, Massachusetts	United States	October	1978		
Carlsbad Marathon	Carlsbad, California	United States	January	1990		
**Chicago Marathon**	Chicago, Illinois	United States	October	1977		
Cleveland Marathon	Cleveland, Ohio	United States	May	1976		
Colorado Colfax Marathon	Denver, Colorado	United States	May	2006		
Columbus Marathon	Columbus, Ohio	United States	October	1980		
Cowtown Marathon	Fort Worth, Texas	United States	February	1978		
Dallas White Rock Marathon	Dallas, Texas	United States	April	1971		
Denver Marathon	Denver, Colorado	United States	October	2006		
Des Moines Marathon	Des Moines, Iowa	United States	October	2002		
Detroit Free Press / Flagstar Marathon	Detroit, Michigan; Windsor, Ontario	United States; Canada	October	1977		
Duke City Marathon	Albuquerque, New Mexico	United States	October	1984		
Earth Day Challenge Marathon	Gambier, Ohio	United States	April	2007		
Eau Claire Marathon	Eau Claire, Wisconsin	United States	April	2009		
El Paso Marathon	El Paso, Texas	United States	March	2007		
Ely Marathon	Ely, Minnesota	United States	September	2015		
Empire State Marathon	Syracuse, New York	United States	October	2011		
Equinox Marathon	Fairbanks, Alaska	United States	September	1963		
Eugene Marathon	Eugene, Oregon	United States	May	2007		
Every Woman's Marathon	Savannah, Georgia	United States	November	2024		
Fargo Marathon	Fargo, North Dakota	United States	May	2005		
Flying Pig Marathon	Cincinnati, Ohio	United States	May	1999		
Fort Lauderdale A1A Marathon	Fort Lauderdale, Florida	United States	February	2006		
Fredericton Marathon	Fredericton, New Brunswick	Canada	May	1979		
Glass City Marathon	Toledo, Ohio	United States	April	1975		
Grand Rapids Marathon	Grand Rapids, Michigan	United States	October	2004		
Grandma's Marathon	Two Harbors to Duluth, Minnesota	United States	June	1977		
Green Bay Marathon (defunct 2024)	Green Bay, Wisconsin	United States	May	2000		
Green Mountain Marathon	South Hero, Vermont	United States	October	1970		
Guadalajara Marathon	Guadalajara	Mexico	November	1984 (Note: The inaugural Guadalajara Marathon in 1984 was a half marathon. The second edition, in 1985, was the first to feature a race with the standard marathon distance of 42.195 km (26.2 mi).)		
Harpeth Hills Flying Monkey Marathon	Nashville, Tennessee	United States	November	2006		
Honolulu Marathon	Honolulu, Hawaii	United States	December	1973		
Houston Marathon	Houston, Texas	United States	January	1972		
Humboldt Redwoods Marathon	Humboldt County, California	United States	October	1972		
Illinois Marathon	Champaign, Illinois	United States	April	2009		
Johnny Miles Marathon	New Glasgow, Nova Scotia	Canada	June	1975		
Kansas City Marathon	Kansas City, Missouri	United States	October	2002		
Kentucky Derby Festival Marathon	Louisville, Kentucky	United States	April	2002		
Knoxville Marathon	Knoxville, Tennessee	United States	April	2002		
Lake Wobegon Trail Marathon	Holdingford to St. Joseph, Minnesota	United States	May	2008		
Las Vegas Marathon	Las Vegas, Nevada	United States	December	1967		
Legs for Literacy Marathon	Moncton, New Brunswick	Canada	October	2000		
Little Rock Marathon	Little Rock, Arkansas	United States	March	2003		
Long Island Marathon	East Meadow, New York	United States	April	1970		
Los Angeles Marathon	Los Angeles, California	United States	March	1986		
Madeline Island Marathon	La Pointe, Wisconsin	United States	May	2017		
Madison Marathon	Madison, Wisconsin	United States	November	2006		
Mankato Marathon	Mankato, Minnesota	United States	October	2009		
Manitoba Marathon	Winnipeg, Manitoba	Canada	June	1979		
Marabana	Havana	Cuba		1987		
Marathon by the Sea	Saint John, New Brunswick	Canada	August	1994		
Mexico City Marathon	Mexico City	Mexico	August	1983		
Maratón Lala	Torreón	Mexico	February	1989		
Mardi Gras Marathon	New Orleans, Louisiana	United States	February	1965		
Marine Corps Marathon	Arlington, Virginia	United States	October	1976		
Marquette Marathon	Marquette, Michigan	United States	August or September	1977		
Maui Marathon	Maui, Hawaii	United States	September	1971		
Med City Marathon	Rochester, Minnesota	United States	May	1996		
Medoc Trail Marathon	Hollister, North Carolina	United States	October	2008		
Miami Marathon	Miami, Florida	United States	January or February	2003		
Milwaukee Lakefront Marathon	Milwaukee, Wisconsin	United States	October	1973		
Milwaukee Marathon	Milwaukee, Wisconsin	United States	March or April	2015		
Minneapolis Marathon (defunct 2016)	Minneapolis, Minnesota	United States	June	2009		
Mississauga Marathon	Mississauga, Ontario	Canada	May	2004		
Mississippi Blues Marathon	Jackson, Mississippi	United States	January	2008		
Monster Mash Marathon	Dover, Delaware	United States	October	2011		
Montreal Marathon	Montreal, Quebec	Canada	September	1979		
Monumental Marathon	Indianapolis, Indiana	United States	November	2008		
Mount Lemmon Marathon	Tucson, Arizona	United States	October	2010		
Myrtle Beach Marathon	Myrtle Beach, South Carolina	United States	February	1998		
Napa Valley Marathon	Calistoga to Napa, California	United States	March	1978		
Nashville Marathon	Nashville, Tennessee	United States	April	2000		
National Marathon	Washington D.C.	United States	March	2006		
Newfoundland and Labrador Provincial Marathon	St. John's, NL	Canada	September	1950		
**New York City Marathon**	New York, New York	United States	November	1970		
Niagara Marathon	Niagara Falls, New York to Niagara Falls, Ontario	United States; Canada	October	1974		
Nunavut Midnight Sun Marathon (defunct 2005)	Arctic Bay, Nunavut	Canada	1981			
Okanagan International Marathon	Kelowna, British Columbia	Canada	October	1995		
Oklahoma City Marathon	Oklahoma City, Oklahoma	United States	April	2001		
Omaha Marathon	Omaha, Nebraska	United States	September	1975		
Ottawa Marathon	Ottawa, Ontario	Canada	May	1975		
Paavo Nurmi Marathon	Iron County, Wisconsin	United States	August	1969		
Gran Maratón Pacifico	Mazatlán	Mexico	December	1999		
Petaluma Spartan Marathon (defunct 1959)	Petaluma, California	United States	April	1935		
Philadelphia Marathon	Philadelphia, Pennsylvania	United States	November	1954		
Pikes Peak Marathon	Manitou Springs, Colorado	United States	August	1956		
Pittsburgh Marathon	Pittsburgh, Pennsylvania	United States	May	1985		
Portland Marathon	Portland, Oregon	United States	October	1972		
Quebec City Marathon	Quebec City, Quebec	Canada	August	1988		
Reggae Marathon	Negril	Jamaica	December	2000		
Richmond Marathon	Richmond, Virginia	United States	November	1978		
Rock 'n' Roll Arizona Marathon	Phoenix, Arizona	United States	January	2004		
Rock 'n' Roll San Diego Marathon	San Diego, California	United States	June	1998		
Run for the Lakes Marathon	Nisswa, Minnesota	United States	April	2008		
St. George Marathon	St. George, Utah	United States	October	1977		
Salt Lake City Marathon	Salt Lake City, Utah	United States	April	2004		
San Francisco Marathon	San Francisco, California	United States	July	1977		
Saskatchewan Marathon	Saskatoon, Saskatchewan	Canada	May	1979		
Seafair Marathon	Seattle, Washington	United States	July	2005		
Seattle Marathon	Seattle, Washington	United States	November	1970		
Self-Transcendence Marathon	Congers, New York	United States	August	2002		
Sioux Falls Marathon	Sioux Falls, South Dakota	United States	September	2012		
Steamtown Marathon	Forest City to Scranton, Pennsylvania	United States	October	1996		
Sunburst Marathon	South Bend, Indiana	United States	June	1984		
Surfside Beach Marathon	Surfside Beach, Texas	United States	February	2005		
Tallahassee Marathon	Tallahassee, Florida	United States	February	1975		
Toronto Marathon	Toronto, Ontario	Canada	May	1995		
Toronto Waterfront Marathon	Toronto, Ontario	Canada	October	2000		
Towpath Marathon	Cuyahoga Valley National Park, Ohio	United States	October	1992		
Twin Cities Marathon	Minneapolis–Saint Paul, Minnesota	United States	October	1982		
United States Air Force Marathon	Dayton, Ohio	United States	September	1997		
Utah Valley Marathon	Provo, Utah	United States	April	2008		
Vancouver Marathon	Vancouver, British Columbia	Canada	May	1972		
Vermont City Marathon	Burlington, Vermont	United States	May	1989		
Victoria Marathon	Victoria, British Columbia	Canada	October	1980		
Walkway Marathon	Poughkeepsie / Highland, New York	United States	June	2015		
Walt Disney World Marathon	Bay Lake, Florida	United States	January	1994		
Warm Up Columbus Marathon	Dublin, Ohio	United States	February	2001		
Whistlestop Marathon	Ashland, Wisconsin	United States	October	1987		
Williams Route 66 Marathon	Tulsa, Oklahoma	United States	November	2006		
Wineglass Marathon	Bath to Corning, New York	United States	October	1981		
Yonkers Marathon	Yonkers, New York	United States	September	1907		

== See also ==
- World Athletics Label Road Races
- World Marathon Majors
- List of World Athletics Label marathon races
- List of marathon races
