= Fredericton Marathon =

Annual marathon race in New Brunswick, Canada

- Fredericton Marathon Logo with Scotiabank Sponsorship
- Date: May
- Location: Fredericton, New Brunswick
- Event type: Road Race
- Distance: Marathon
- Primary sponsor: Scotiabank
- Established: 1979, 47 years ago
- Course records: Men: 2:24:40 (2023); Stanley Chaisson; Female: 2:53:30 (2023); Sarah Mulcahy
- Website: FrederictonMarathon.ca

The Fredericton Marathon is an annual marathon (42.195 km/26.219 mi) race held in Fredericton, New Brunswick, Canada. The Fredericton Marathon is the oldest annual marathon race in the province of New Brunswick, starting with only a few hundred runners in 1979, it has grown into one of the most well-known marathons in the province, with the 2012 edition being the provincial half marathon championships and featuring over 1,300 runners. The race is a Boston Marathon qualifier, with 65 of the 166 finishers qualifying in the 2012 edition of the run, the most annually in the province. The race is held in mid-May, always one week before the Blue Nose Marathon in Halifax, Nova Scotia. Currently, the race is sponsored by Scotiabank and hosted by The Capital City Road Runners, a running club in the city.

In 2017, Canadian Running Magazine reported Fredericton Marathon to have the highest rate of Boston qualifying performances in Canada, with over 30 percent of finishers achieving the time standard in 2017.

== Events ==
Although the headline event for the Fredericton Marathon is a full marathon race, it also features a half-marathon, 10 kilometer, 5 kilometer, and a youth and kids run, consisting of a 1km or 3km for kids aged 5 - 14, and a 5km challenge for students in high school.

== Course ==
The Fredericton Marathon starts and finishes at Queen Square at 730 Aberdeen Street, just by University of New Brunswick and St. Thomas University. The run crosses the Saint John River around the 1.5km mark and runs along paved and gravel trail next to the Nashwaak River. The 5km runners turn around not too far after crossing the river, while all other runners continue on towards Marysville, a suburban neighbourhood of Fredericton, where 10km runners will turn around, leaving half marathon and full marathon runners to continue. Both the half marathon and full marathon runners will turn around after approximately 10.25km and head back to the start/finish line where the half marathon runners will finish and the full marathon runners will be left with another lap to complete.

== Records ==
10K

- Male: 33:13 - Byron Wood (Fredericton, NB) 2007
- Female: 39:47 - Rachael McCarvill (Fredericton, NB) 2011

Half Marathon

- Male: 01:13:24 - Alex Coffin (Saint John, NB) 2003
- Female: 01:19:29 - Paula Keating (Miramichi, NB) 2012

Marathon

- Male: 02:24:40 - Stanley Chaisson (Charlottetown, PE) 2023
- Female: 2:53:30 - Sarah Mulcahy (Fort Kent, ME) 2023

== Challenges ==
In 2013 Fredericton Marathon, Moncton's Legs For Literacy Marathon and Saint John's Marathon by the Sea formed the Tri-City Run. Runners in each of these events, regardless of the distance they run, received medals that can be combined to form a "mega-medal" known as the "Tri-City Medallion." The June 2013 edition of iRun listed the Tri-City run as one of Canada's unique races.

In 2014 the Miramichi Rock 'n' Run race was added to these three races, forming the "New Brunswick Challenge." Runners completing a race at all four events will receive the New Brunswick challenge medal.

== See also ==
- List of marathon races in North America
