= Geoffrey Kiprotich =

Geoffrey Kiprotich is a name of Kenyan origin that may refer to:

- Geoffrey Kiprotich Rono (born 1997), Kenyan sprinter, 4th at 2016 World U20 Championships 400 m
- Geoffrey Kiprotich (runner) (born 1978), Kenyan marathon runner based in Toledo, Ohio, winner of the 2013 Kansas City Marathon, the 2014 Glass City Marathon as well as the Sioux Falls Marathon in 2016.
