= Falmouth Marathon =

Falmouth Marathon may suggest:

- The Cape Cod Marathon, held in Falmouth, Massachusetts
- The Falmouth Road Race, a shorter race also held in Falmouth, Massachusetts
