= Walkway Marathon =

Hudson Valley Marathon at the Walkway Over the Hudson
- Date: May 5, 2024
- Location: Walkway Over the Hudson Highlands, New York & Poughkeepsie, New York Dutchess Rail Trail Poughkeepsie, New York
- Event type: Road and rail trail
- Distance: 1 mile, 5k, 10k, half marathon, marathon
- Established: 2023
- Organizer: Alpha Win
- Website: hudsonvalleymarathon.com

The Hudson Valley Marathon at the Walkway Over the Hudson presented by Alpha Win is the premier running race in the Hudson Valley region of New York. The event took over the Walkway Marathon for their first event in May 2023. The first race had 1,000 participants.

The 2024 event will be held on Sunday, May 5. The location is at the historic Walkway Over the Hudson, the world's longest elevated pedestrian bridge which connect Ulster and Dutchess counties from Highland to Poughkeepsie, NY, respectively. The race begins on the Highland side of the bridge at the entrance to the Hudson Valley Rail Trail, and then continues onto the Dutchess Rail Trail in Poughkeepsie.

The race offers a distance for everyone with 1 mile, 5k, 10k, half marathon and marathon races being offered. The race has recently become a Boston Qualifier, and the half marathon and marathon courses are USATF certified (half marathon course: NY23004DNB; marathon course: NY23005DNB).

== Alpha Win ==
Alpha Win is a triathlon and running event operator based in Saugerties, New York. Since its founding in 2011, Alpha Win has produced more than 135 triathlons and running races all over the United States.

== List of winners ==
=== Marathon ===
Edition	Year	Men's winner	Time (h:m:s)	Women's winner	Time (h:m:s)
1st	May 7, 2023	Jamie Stroffolino	2:47:02	Laurie Monti	3:16:56
2nd	May 7, 2023	Brandon Ginsburg	2:47:18	Lauren Scarupa	3:22:18
3rd	May 7, 2023	David Hutcheson	2:50:01	Noelle Cutter	3:25:29

=== Half marathon ===
Year	Men's winner	Time (h:m:s)	Women's winner	Time (h:m:s)
2023	Ryan Carney	1:16:02	Michaela McMahon	1:30:14
2023	Robert Ordish	1:18:44	Jaqueline Pollack	1:37:30
2023	Winston Vaughan	1:22:54	Genny Weaver	1:41:43

=== 10k race ===
Year	Men's winner	Time (h:m:s)	Women's winner	Time (h:m:s)
2023	Matthew Gazin	00:39:42	Brianne Connington	00:46:09
2023	Zachary Boller	00:41:50	Krystal Gallagher	00:46:37
2023	Meet Patel	00:43:04	Stacey Henderson	00:47:05

=== 5K race ===
Year	Men's winner	Time (m:s)	Women's winner	Time (m:s)
2023	Max Boller	00:18:42	Danielle Eckler	00:20:28
2023	Theo Richardson	00:19:25	Victoria Kelly	00:22:59
2023	Jose Buitrago	00:19:58	Kiera Loftus	00:23:01

== See also ==
- List of marathon races in North America
