= Legs for Literacy =

Annual October Marathon, 5km, and 10km Races in New Brunswick, Canada

Coordinates: 46.0852°N 64.7841°W

- Official Logo
- Date: October
- Location: Moncton, New Brunswick
- Event type: Road Race
- Distance: Marathon; 26.219 miles (42.195 km)
- Primary sponsor: IGT
- Established: 2000, 26 years ago
- Course records: Men: 2:39:40 (2016); Jean-Marc Doiron; Women: 3:04:23 (2009); Leah Jabbour
- Website: LegsforLiteracy.com

Legs for Literacy is an annual marathon held in Moncton, New Brunswick, Canada in October. The race day also includes a half marathon, 10 km, and 5 km race.

The event has quickly become the largest running event in the province, and one of the largest in Atlantic Canada. In 2017, the event featured a total of 2,270 finishers, and approximately 300 more in the family run/walk held the day prior. The event raises funds for local literacy initiatives, with over $674,000 raised as of 2016. The title sponsor of the event is currently IGT, an arcade and online gaming company, while each race distance is sponsored by an individual company that usually changes each year. The event has had numerous sponsors, including Recharge With Milk (a campaign by Dairy Farmers of Canada), Majesta, AstraZeneca, Subway, Booster Juice, Tim Hortons, Medavie Blue Cross, the Royal Bank of Canada, Running Room, GoodLife Fitness, and UNI Financial Cooperation, among others. The event commonly serves as the New Brunswick Championships for the half marathon and marathon distance.

The event is a Boston Marathon qualifier, with 41 of the 176 finishers qualifying in the 2017 edition of the run. Half marathon times achieved at the event can be used for qualification at the New York City Marathon.

In 2015, Canadian Running Magazine named Legs for Literacy one of the top ten Canadian fall races with the best scenery.

== Background ==
Legs for Literacy was started in 2000 by a small group of local runners and a team of volunteers. The group saw a need for an event to raise funds for local school literacy programs. The first editions of the event featured 5 and 10 km distances. Over the years the race grew to include the half marathon distance in 2004, and in 2005 the marathon distance was added. For its first years, the event took place in late August and moved to late October for the 2004 and 2005 years. The event was hosted in early November from 2006 to 2008, moving back to the end of October in 2009. Due to strong support from the running community and business sponsors, the race has grown from 268 total participants in 2005 (just 46 marathon finishers), to almost 800 total finishers in 2006, to 2818 finishers in 2013 (with 3100 registered), with another 400 kids entered in the youth event.

== Events ==
Although the headline event for Legs for Literacy is a full marathon race, it also features a half-marathon, 10 kilometre (with a division for Nordic walkers), 5 kilometre, a relay race, and a youth athletics event.

== Course ==
The half marathon and marathon courses have been consistent over the years but has featured small changes due to the location of the year's official race hotel. The event starts and finishes at the same point, on Main Street in Downtown Moncton. The 5 kilometer and 10 kilometer routes change almost every year.

=== Half marathon and marathon route ===
Starting on Main Street adjacent to Alma Street, participants head east on Main Street, turning right onto Mechanic Street, proceeding down to Assumption Boulevard, then turn right, heading west on Assumption Boulevard to Lutz Street.

Heading north on Lutz Street, participants turn left onto Record Street, continuing on to Albert Street and then crossing Assumption Boulevard to proceed onto the Gunningsville Bridge into Riverview.

Exiting the bridge heading west, participants enter onto riverfront trail. Participants exit the trail just prior to the riverfront playground and continue on the west-bound lane of Coverdale Road. Just past the Atlantic Superstore, participants enter back onto the riverfront trail and head towards the Petitcodiac River Causeway. At the Causeway, participants turnaround and head east on the riverfront trail towards East Riverview. Participants then proceed on the riverfront trail east of Point Park, where they turnaround and head west back to the entrance of the Gunningsville Bridge, heading back to the trail in Moncton, turning right off the bridge down to the trail. Participants then proceed east on the trail towards Dieppe.

Half marathon participants turn onto trail just past Virginia Street trail head and proceed west on trail, turning right off trail prior to the Rogers building, exiting onto Mechanic Street, then turning left onto Main to finish.

Full marathon participants proceed on the riverfront trail, exiting onto Gillespie Street, then turning left onto Pointe aux Renards Street to Amirault Street. Crossing Amirault, turning right proceeding to Fox Creek Road, participants proceed to Melanson Road, making a left turn then a right turn, proceeding to Bourque Road all the way up to Chartersville Road. Participants then turn left onto Chartersville, where they proceed to Centrale Street, turning left on Centrale, proceeding east onto Vanier Street, then left onto Gregoire Street, then left on Broussard, exiting left onto Centrale. Participants continue on a slight downhill towards Melanson and turn left, moving up to Fox Creek Road where they turn left, heading back toward Amirault. Participants cross Amirault, then continue on a slight uphill to Pointe aux Renards, and proceed to the end of Pointe aux Renards, turning right onto trail which leads back to the trail head at Gillespie. Participants then head northwest on the trail following the trail back to Moncton, exiting the trail just prior to the Rogers building onto Mechanic Street, then left on Main Street to the finish.

The half marathon and marathon routes start and finish at an elevation of 25 meters and reach a maximum elevation of 40 meters. The half marathon and full marathon courses are certified by Athletics Canada. The half marathon route surface is 65 percent paved and 35 percent dirt, while the marathon route is 100 percent paved.

The marathon also features a relay category with participants covering the marathon distance in teams. Teams feature a minimum of four runners and a maximum of eight.

== Past winners ==
Key: Course record

| Edition | Year | Men's winner | Time (h:m:s) | Women's winner | Time (h:m:s) |
|---|---|---|---|---|---|
| 1st | 2005 | Carol Lepage | 2:51:26 | Catharine Tutton | 3:23:35 |
| 2nd | 2006 | Alex Coffin | 2:49:39 | Beverly Robertson | 3:22:15 |
| 3rd | 2007 | Ray Moorehead | 2:54:56 | Natalie Arsenault | 3:33:02 |
| 4th | 2008 | Leo McCosham | 2:56:59 | Micheline Drisdelle | 3:23:13 |
| 5th | 2009 | Chris Brake | 2:42:00 | Leah Jabbour | 3:04:23 |
| 6th | 2010 | Paul Comeau | 3:02:43 | Brenda Benson | 3:43:34 |
| 7th | 2011 | Steven Baglole | 2:39:57 | Kinue Taga | 3:17:26 |
| 8th | 2012 | Scott Clark | 2:53:43 | Kara Grant | 3:28:17 |
| 9th | 2013 | Chuck Dixon | 2:49:21 | Marie-France Roy | 3:17:11 |
| 10th | 2014 | Lee Roy | 2:40:09 | Elita Rahn | 3:11:00 |
| 11th | 2015 | Ryan O'Shea | 2:39:54 | Florence Gillis | 3:18:23 |
| 12th | 2016 | Jean-Marc Doiron | 2:39:40 | Heather O'Donnell | 3:10:09 |
| 13th | 2017 | Daniel Leblanc | 2:41:18 | Emily James | 3:07:14 |
| 14th | 2018 | Michael Peterson | 2:48:02 | Emily Hamilton | 3:00:00 |

== Challenge Series ==
In 2013 Legs for Literacy, Fredericton Marathon, and Saint John's Marathon by the Sea formed the Tri-City Run. Runners in each of these events, regardless of the distance they ran, received medals that can be combined to form a "mega-medal" known as the "Tri-City Medallion." The June 2013 edition of iRun listed the Tri-City run as one of Canada's unique races.

In 2014 the Miramichi Rock 'n' Run race was added to these three races, forming the "New Brunswick Challenge." Runners completing a race at all four events will receive the New Brunswick Challenge medal.

== See also ==
- List of marathon races in North America
