= Grand Rapids Marathon =

- The Metro Health Grand Rapids Marathon Logo
- Date: October 18, 2020
- Location: Western Michigan, ending in Grand Rapids
- Event type: Road
- Distance: Marathon
- Established: 2004
- Website: grandrapidsmarathon.com

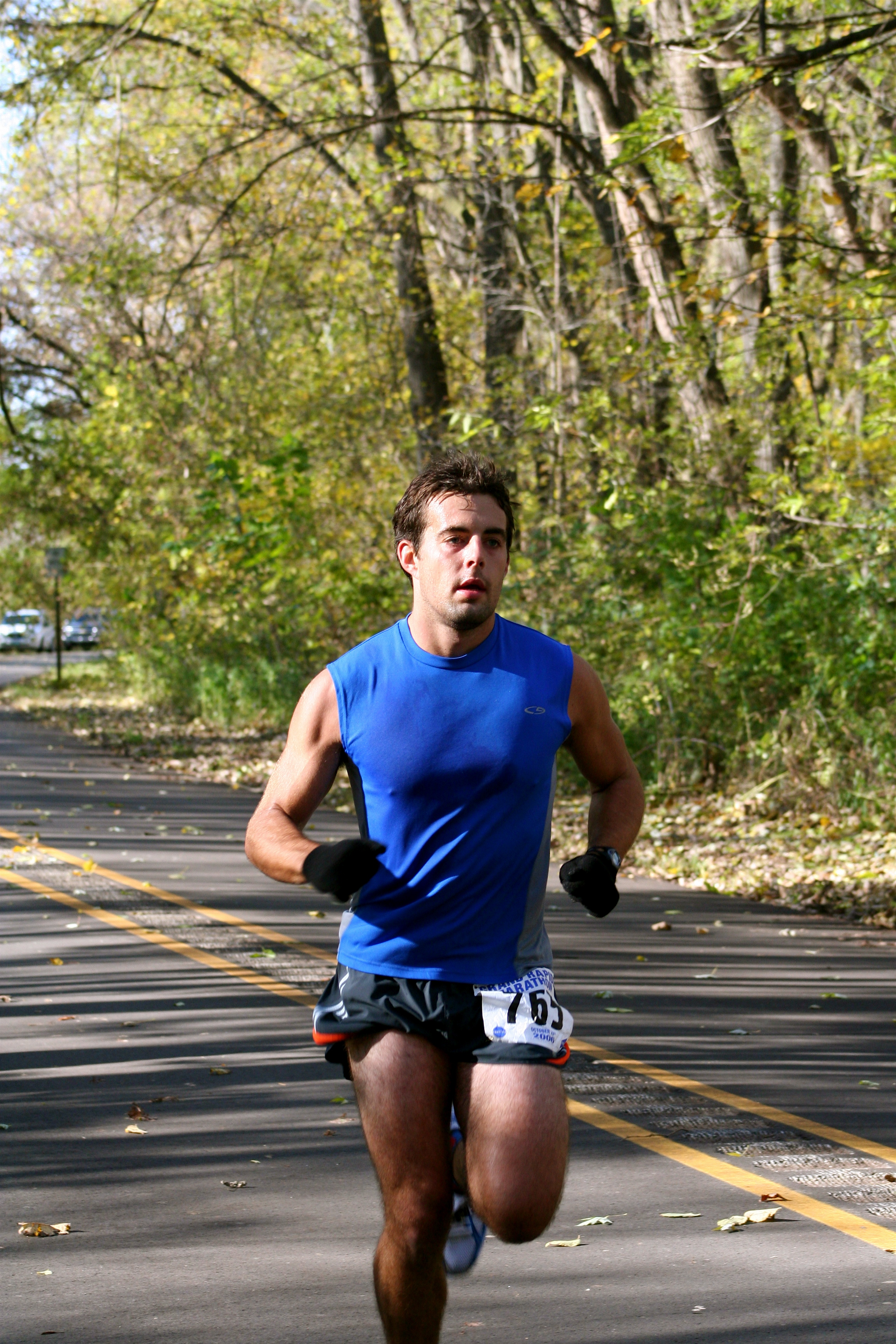
A participant in 2006

The Metro Health/Grand Rapids Marathon is a 26.219-mile (42.195 km) race run every October in Grand Rapids, Michigan, USA since 2004. It is a USATF certified course. The Grand Rapids Marathon picked up Metro Health as a title sponsor in 2008. The full marathon gives runners a tour of downtown Grand Rapids and then heads out of the city and into the trails of Millennium Park. It is considered a flat, fast course and is a qualifying opportunity for the Boston Marathon.

The race director is Don Kern.

The marathon utilizes "celebrity" pace teams, based on the times of famous people who had run marathons. The current pace teams include Oprah Winfrey (4:29), P. Diddy (4:14), Will Ferrell (3:56), George W. Bush (3:44), William Baldwin (3:24), and Pi (3:14).

Apart from the main event, there is also a kids marathon, 5K, 10K, half-marathon, marathon relay and fitness expo.

The course record of 2:26.41 was set by David Mart (Zeeland, Michigan) in 2013.

The 2017 overall winner was Mike Camilleri (Howell, Michigan) with a time of 2:34:40. The 2017 female winner was Sara Sandborn (Sunfield, Michigan), who achieved a time of 2:58:03. Also in 2017, Tod Buckingham (Okemos, Michigan) won the half-marathon with a time of 1:13:29, and Lauren MacVicar (Kalamazoo, Michigan) was the female winner with 1:25:51.
