= North American Men's Marathon Relay Championships =

- Status: Defunct
- Genre: Marathon relay
- Begins: October 11, 2003
- Ends: October 2, 2004
- Frequency: annual
- Venue: Akron Marathon
- Location: Akron, Ohio
- Country: United States
- Years active: 2
- Participants: Canada, Mexico, United States

The North American Men's Marathon Relay Championships was a men's international team long-distance running competition between North American nations. It was held on two occasions, in 2003 and 2004, both of which were incorporated into the annual Akron Marathon.

The relay format differed from six-man ekiden teams common in Japan, and instead featured teams of five runners covering 10 km legs for the first and third leg, 5 km legs for the second and fourth leg, then a final leg of 12.195 km to complete the classic 42.195 km marathon distance. The prize for first place was US$25,000.

The three competing nations were Canada, Mexico and the United States. Mexico won both competitions, with the United States placing second and Canada third in both 2003 and 2004. Salvador Miranda, Alejandro Suárez and Armando Torres were members of the winning Mexican team in both years and set the championship record of 2:05:30 hours at the first edition.

It was the first ever continental marathon relay championship and came five years after the folding of the IAAF World Road Relay Championships in 1998. The North American 5K Championships, also including a team road running format, was formed a year earlier in 2002.

== Editions ==
Edition	Year	City	Country	Date	No. of athletes	No. of nations
1st	2003	Akron, Ohio	United States	11 October 2003	15	3
2nd	2004	Akron, Ohio	United States	2 October 2004	15	3

== Results ==
Year	Gold		Silver		Bronze	
2003	Mexico; Pablo Olmedo (29:43); Armando Torres (14:27); Alejandro Suárez (29:58); Salvador Miranda (16:18); Teodora Vega (35:04)	2:05:30 CR	United States; Clint Wells (30:05); Ryan Kirkpatrick (14:34); Richie Brinker (30:01); Peter Sherry (15:55); Nolan Swanson (36:38)	2:07:13	Canada; Matthew Kerr (29:43); Reid Coolsaet (14:43); Taylor Murphy (30:52); Alex Hutchinson (16:39); Matthew McInnes (37:57)	2:09:54
2004	Mexico; Salvador Miranda (30:08); Juan Luis Barrios (14:05); Rafael Sánchez (29:51); Armando Torres (14:47); Alejandro Suárez (36:45)	2:05:35	United States; Chris Graff (30:09); Ahman Dirks (14:55); Dan Browne (28:57); Josh Eberly (15:01); Ryan Shay (36:39)	2:05:39	Canada; Paul Morrison (31:32); Ryan McKenzie (14:39); Matt Johnston (30:44); David Milne (16:01); Andrew Smith (38:38)	2:11:32
