= Maui Marathon =

- Date: April
- Location: Maui, Hawaii, United States
- Event type: Road
- Distance: Marathon, half marathon, 10k, 5k
- Established: 1971
- Website: Maui Marathon
- Participants: 349 finishers (2022); 1818 (2019 Finishers All Races)

The Maui Marathon is a marathon located in Maui, Hawaii. As of 2022, it is held in April; in the past, it was held in the fall.

Established in 1971, the event is notable as one of the oldest marathon races in the United States. It is the second most prestigious marathon event in the state of Hawaii behind only the Honolulu Marathon.

It is the longest recurring running event in the state of Hawaii.

The award-winning course was recognized by Runner's World as one of the Top 10 Most Scenic Marathons in the United States. In the Ultimate Guide to Marathons, the Maui Marathon was recognized as the #10 destination marathon in North America.

In addition to the marathon, competitors have the option of running in the half-marathon, 10k, 5k, or marathon-relay run events.

== List of winners of the Maui Marathon ==
=== Men's ===
Year	Winner	Country	Time	Notes
2010	Matt Stevens	United States	2:47:36	
2011	Yutaka Fukuda	Japan	2:51:20	
2012	Allen Wagner	United States	2:43:33	
2013	Takanori Haraguchi	Japan	2:43:50	
2014	Reid Hunter	United States	2:50:57	
2015	Reid Hunter	United States	2:44:57	Second Victory
2016	Craig Benson	United States	2:51:31	
2017	Tetsuya Yoroizaka	Japan	2:43:21	
2018	Tadashi Yamaura	Canada	3:00:15	
2019	Michael Morrison	United States	2:45:14	
2022	Andrew Lee	United States	2:52:38	
2023	Todd Robbins	United States	2:47:40	
2024	Albert Boyce	United States	1:24:53	*there was no marathon in 2024, only a half marathon

=== Women's ===
Year	Winner	Country	Time	Notes
2010	Yoko Yamazawa	Japan	3:13:48	
2011	Nicole Chyr	United States	2:57:35	
2012	Verity Breen	United States	3:04:08	
2013	Rhonda Loo	United States	3:07:18	
2014	Malia Crouse	United States	3:01:54	
2015	Yuko Nakai	United States	3:19:24	
2016	Yuko Nakai	United States	3:11:16	Second Victory
2017	Yuko Nakai	United States	3:17:11	Third Victory
2018	Jessy Forgues	Canada	3:07:02	
2019	Malia Crouse	United States	3:07:07	
2022	Gina Domaoal	United States	3:06:22	
2023	Marissa Dutton	United States	3:35:20	
2024	Anna Gitter	United States	1:34:03	*there was no marathon in 2024, only a half marathon

== See also ==
- List of marathon races in North America
