= Wineglass Marathon =

- Date: October
- Location: Finger Lakes
- Event type: Marathon
- Established: 1981
- Website: wineglassmarathon.com

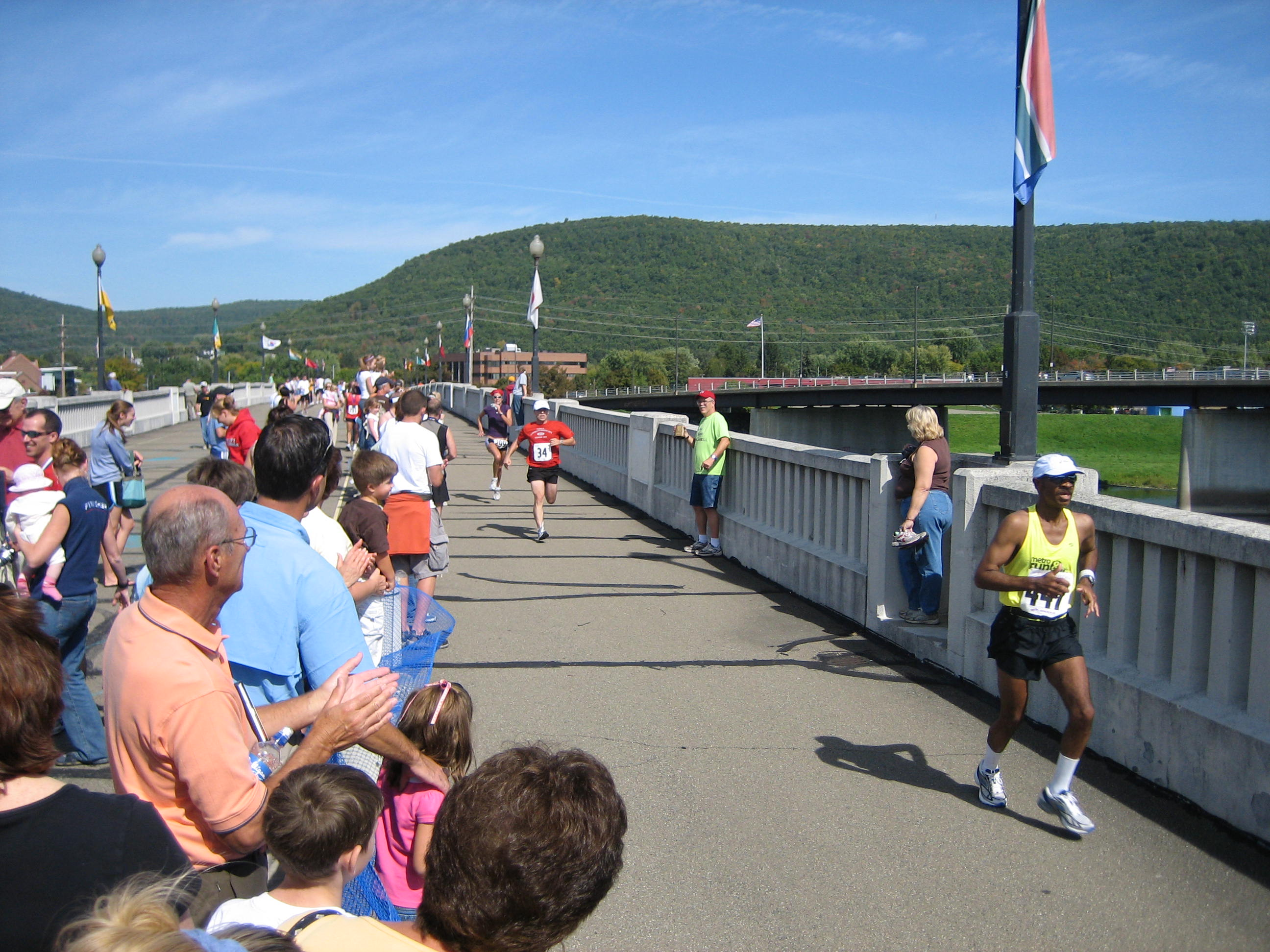
Crossing the pedestrian bridge at the end of the Wineglass Marathon

The Wineglass Marathon is a marathon and team relay of the same distance held each October in the Finger Lakes region of New York state. The race is a point-to-point course starting in Bath, and finishing in Corning. In 2009, the Wineglass Marathon had the eighth highest percentage of participants to qualify for the Boston Marathon with 209 runners, or 27.0%, qualifying.

== The course ==
The Wineglass Marathon course starts in the parking lot at Philips Lighting, just north of Bath, NY. It begins with a 40 ft. drop over the first mile as it proceeds into downtown Bath. Miles 2-4 are relatively flat. The first hill is located at the 4.75 mile mark, where there is approximately a 40 ft. uphill climb. Over the next four miles the course passes through the countryside. In this section, there are two small hills to climb despite an overall drop in elevation of 90 ft. Runners then enter the town of Savona where the first Team Relay zone is located. Exiting Savona, runners again pass through the countryside with the course continuing its slight downhill slide, approximately 40 ft. over the next 4 miles before reaching the mid-way point located in Campbell.

After leaving Campbell, the course rises 30 ft. at mile 14. The next 4.2 miles show another slight drop in elevation totaling 80 ft. until the runners come into Coopers Plains, site of the second Team Relay exchange. Two miles out, the runners enter a small park just inside the town of Painted Post and continue on with a route through a residential neighborhood. At mile 22.5, the runners come to a bike path and from there it is a virtually a flat course to the finish. The participants pass through Riverside and downtown Corning. The finish is located just after crossing a pedestrian bridge which passes over the Chemung River.

== History ==
The race was first held in 1981 and has been held annually ever since. The course records are:

Male Open: Joseph Whelan, Webster, NY 2:16:58 (2023)
Female Open: Diane Neubauer, Ambler, PA 2:42:44 (2024)
Male Masters (40+): Steve Wilson, IN 2:28:55 (2002)
Female Masters (40+): Nathalie Goyer, Canada 2:50:31 (2008)

== See also ==
Marathon

List of marathon races in North America
