= Mississauga Marathon =

Marathon race held in Mississauga

- Mississauga Marathon logo
- Date: May
- Location: Mississauga, Ontario, Canada
- Event type: Road
- Distance: Marathon
- Established: 2004
- Website: Official Site

The Mississauga Marathon was an annual marathon race held in Mississauga, Ontario, Canada. It was held from 2004 to 2022. The race was a qualifier for the Boston Marathon.

In 2023, it was replaced by a new event, the Mississauga Half, which included a half marathon, 10K and 5K races due to new ownership. In 2024, the marathon event is brought back as Beneva becomes the new sponsor for the 42 km event. Mississauga Marathon is again offering all formats of the event, including full marathon, half marathon, 10K, and 5K.

== History ==
With a mandate of "A Run for Everyone", the Mississauga Marathon has a festival atmosphere where spectators, volunteers, runners and their families enjoy a day of fitness and entertainment. The event includes the full marathon, half marathon, team relay challenge, 10K & 10K student relay, a community favourite, "The Hazel" 5K and the 2K Family Fun Run/Walk rounds out the weekend ensuring that there truly is an event for everyone.

== Route ==
This point to point course is a fast net downhill. The course starts at Mississauga's City Hall, and makes its way west across the Credit River to Mississauga Road and then travels south for a beautiful stretch past the University of Toronto's Mississauga Campus, Mississauga Golf and Country Club, and continues through some of Mississauga's most beautiful residential neighbourhoods, before winding along the scenic Lake Ontario Waterfront Trail, and back along the Lakeshore to the finish at Lakefront Promenade Park. Small inclines are found at 10 km and 24 km. The 'net' downhill aspect of this race still exists, however, with a 250' (or 80m) drop from start to finish.

== See also ==
- List of marathon races in North America
