= Myrtle Beach Marathon =

Marathon in South Carolina

- Location: Myrtle Beach, South Carolina
- Event type: Road
- Distance: Marathon Half Marathon Marathon Relay 5k Kids' Mile
- Established: 1998
- Course records: Men: 2:26:24 (2012); Stuart Moran; Women: 2:40:11 (2011); Kathleen Castles (overall winner)
- Website: mbmarathon.com

The Myrtle Beach Marathon is a marathon which takes place in Myrtle Beach, South Carolina. It is held annually on the first Saturday in March. 5,500 to 7,500 individuals participate in the race annually. It is the largest marathon in South Carolina and was named one of the 'Top Ten Winter Marathons' by USA Today.

The marathon course, which the half marathon follows for the first 12.1 miles, has a maximum elevation of 19.98 ft and a total ascent of 110.02 ft. The Myrtle Beach Marathon was ranked is the 8th most likely marathon to qualify for the Boston Marathon with 16.1% of the marathon field earning their ticket to Boston in 2016.

The race was moved from Washington's Birthday to March in 2016, and in 2017 became part of Raleigh, North Carolina–based Capstone Events, which owns events such as the Bay to Breakers event. The 2021 marathon was moved to May and became the first marathon in the state after the pandemic.

== List of winners of the Myrtle Beach Marathon ==
=== Men's ===
Year	Winner	Country	Time	Notes
1998	Rob Wilder	United States	2:30:30	Inaugural All Star Cafe Marathon
1999	Javier Jimenez (MEX)	Mexico	2:29:47	
2000	Peter Cotland	United States	2:28:46	
2001	Michael Colaicovo	United States	2:34:26	
2002	Peter Cotland	United States	2:34:22	Second Victory
2003	Scott Colford	United States	2:39:52	
2004	Scott Colford	United States	2:40:11	Second Victory
2005	Robert Marchinko	United States	2:31:20	
2006	David Kawa	United States	2:32:48	
2007	Scott Mullins	United States	2:30:09	
2008	Garick Hill	United States	2:28:33	
2009	Cameron Bell	United States	2:34:12	
2011	Billy Shue	United States	2:43:47	Not race winner.
2012	Stuart Moran	United States	2:26:24	Course Record
2013	Dean Thompson	United States	2:39:14	
2014	Tom Clifford	United States	2:30:06	
2015	Steve Sinko	United States	2:40:12	
2016	Bradley Reach	United States	2:39:51	
2017	Pedro Meraz	United States	2:45:30	First race under Capstone Races.
2018	Eddie Posey	United States	2:43:16	
2019	Glenn Burkhardt	United States	2:42:41	
2020	Matthew Leonard	United States	2:36:15	
2021	Ken Rideout	United States	2:30:58	Moved to May because of Pandemic. Masters Division (49 years 364 days)
2022	Matthew Leonard	United States	2:40:18	
2023	Danny Horgan	United States	2:38:26	
2024	Austen Hughes	United States	2:31:51	
2025	Jeffrey Woesolowksi	United States	2:34:04	

=== Women's ===
Year	Winner	Country	Time	Notes
1998	Patty Loggins	United States	3:01:59	
1999	Mary Chute	United States	2:55:42	
2000	Patty Shepard	United States	3:00:26	
2001	Heather Kempinger	United States	2:55:34	
2002	Wendi Ray	United States	2:47:59	
2003	Sherry Thompson	United States	2:57:30	
2004	Christine Rockey	United States	3:04:35	
2005	Luanne Coulter	United States	2:52:03	
2006	Luanne Coulter	United States	2:55:51	Second Victory
2007	Tracy Stewart	United States	2:55:50	
2008	Gayle White	United States	2:49:04	
2009	Elizabeth Whiting	United States	2:56:19	
2011	Kathleen Castles	United States	2:40:11	Course Record; Overall winner
2012	Jennifer Adams	United States	2:53:07	
2013	Regina Horak	United States	2:54:20	
2014	Christine Shaw	United States	2:58:38	
2015	Allison Pastorek	United States	2:59:21	
2016	Lauren Liuzzo	United States	3:02:58	
2017	Erin Miller	United States	2:58:33	
2018	Jen Helmer	United States	3:09:27	
2019	Erin Miller	United States	3:03:53	Second win.
2020	Heather Zealand	United States	2:57:44	
2021	Kelli Proctor	United States	2:52:45	Moved to May because of pandemic. Masters division (age 43).
2022	Megan Hepp Hovis	United States	2:56:29	
2023	Christa Collins	United States	2:58:40	
2024	Natalie Daniels	United States	2:44:52	
2025	Natalie Daniels	United States	2:51:53	

No race in 2010 (ice)

== See also ==
- List of marathon races in North America
