= Okanagan International Marathon =

- Okanagan Marathon
- Date: October
- Location: Kelowna, British Columbia, Canada
- Event type: Road
- Distance: Marathon
- Primary sponsor: Sun-Rype
- Established: 1995
- Course records: Men: (Canada) Larry Nightingale 2:27:03; Women: (Japan) Noriko Kawaguchi 2:49:44
- Website: Okanagan Marathon

The Okanagan International Marathon is an annual marathon event held in Kelowna, British Columbia, Canada. The race has been run each year since 1995 and is a Boston Marathon qualifying race.

== History ==
The Okanagan International Marathon is as a major fundraiser for the interior of BC. Held in the fall in Kelowna and has a history of Boston qualifying times on a course, which attracts both the elite and recreational runner. To date the Okanagan International Marathon has donated in excess of $173,000 to the Sunshine Foundation Dream for Kids. Growing from a small marathon with a group of dedicated runners the event today has over 3,400 participants.

The event includes the Full Marathon, Half Marathon, 10K & 5K Family Fun Run/Walk as well as the BMO Kids run. On October 10, 2010, runners converged on Kelowna's City Park for the 42.2 km marathon, 21.1 km half-marathon and 10 km walk and run.

== Results ==
Edition	Year	Men's Winner	Time (h:m:s)	Women's Winner	Time (h:m:s)
1st	1995	Larry Nightingale (CAN)	2:30:34	Jan McKinnon (CAN)	3:07:46
2nd	1996	Larry Nightingale (CAN)	2:27:03	Linda Marshall (CAN)	3:02:37
3rd	1997	Nigel Winfield (GBR)	2:28:30	Sandy Jacobson (CAN)	2:49:53
4th	1998	Ryan Leef (CAN)	2:38:20	Noriko Kawaguchi (JPN)	2:49:44
5th	1999	Donald Bambury (CAN)	2:36:27	Nathalie Butler (CAN)	2:56:11
6th	2000	Donald Bambury (CAN)	2:35:39	Fariyal Samson (CAN)	2:57:42
7th	2001	Marc Collie (CAN)	2:38:36	Petra Graen (CAN)	3:00:40
8th	2002	Sergio Pio (CAN)	2:45:05	Julie Heidt (CAN)	3:14:01
9th	2003	Sergio Pio (CAN)	2:42:57	Heidi Schmutzer (CAN)	3:06:47
10th	2004	Sergio Pio (CAN)	2:44:35	Barb Scatchard (CAN)	3:05:50
11th	2005	Marc Collie (CAN)	2:42:08	Kari Elliott (CAN)	3:08:46
12th	2006	Trevor Haaheim (CAN)	2:38:34	Amanda McLeod (CAN)	3:06:22
13th	2007	Scott Tremblay (CAN)	2:38:27	Amanda McLeod (CAN)	3:14:23
14th	2008	Brian Torrance (CAN)	2:39:56	Gillian Moody (CAN)	2:55:50
15th	2009	Brent Pickerl (CAN)	2:51:54	Paige Howat (CAN)	3:11:50
16th	2010	Jack Cook (CAN)	2:39:16	Keddi-Anne Siterbino (CAN)	3:00:05
17th	2011	James Curran (CAN)	2:44:54	Heather Johnson (CAN)	3:10:20
18th	2012	James Curran (CAN)	2:51:10	Rhonda Loo (CAN)	3:00:40
19th	2013	Brendan Lunty (CAN)	2:30:29	Allison Blackmore (GBR)	3:06:07
20th	2014	Ryan Prachnau (CAN)	2:39:36	Danielle Bourgeois (CAN)	3:02:47
21st	2015	Lewis Kelly (CAN)	2:39:36	Abigail Huyser (CAN)	3:04:25
22nd	2016	Ryan Prachnau (CAN)	2:39:49	Kari Elliott (CAN)	2:52:47
23rd	2017	David Eikelboom (CAN)	2:34:27	Claire Young (CAN)	3:06:12
24th	2018	Curtis Sampson (CAN)	2:52:59	Cosette Lemelin (CAN)	3:06:31
25th	2019	Vik Bains (CAN)	2:38:12	Kailyn Nelson (CAN)	3:05:45

== See also ==
- List of marathon races in North America
