= Esther Erb =

American long-distance runner

Esther Erb Atkins
Personal information
- Born: Esther Phoebe Erb; April 20, 1986 (age 40) Richmond, Virginia, US
- Height: 5'4.5"
- Weight: 116

Sport
- Country: United States
- Sport: Track and field
- Event: Marathon
- University team: Case Western Reserve

Esther Erb Atkins (born April 20, 1986) is an American long-distance runner. She competed in the marathon event at the 2015 World Championships in Athletics in Beijing, China.

== Major races ==
Erb placed 24th in the marathon event at the 2015 World Championships in Athletics in Beijing, China.

Erb won the 2014 USA Marathon Championships at the Twin Cities Marathon and qualified for the 2016 U.S. Olympic Trials in Los Angeles, California.

Erb placed 27th in the U.S. Olympic Marathon Trials on January 14, 2012, in Houston, and 11th in the U.S. Olympic Marathon Trials on February 13, 2016, in Los Angeles.

== Collegiate career ==
Erb was an NCAA Division III 10,000M champion, six time NCAA All-American and two-time Academic All-American while competing at Case Western Reserve University. After graduating from Case Western, she spent two years as a Fulbright teaching fellow in Austria.

Erb was a professional runner from ZAP Fitness from 2010 - 2013. She won the Tallahassee Marathon in 2014 with a time of 2:46:28.

Erb worked as an assistant cross country and distance coach at Rider University from 2013 - 2015. She joined the Appalachian State University athletics department in 2015.
