= Saskatchewan Marathon =

Canadian marathon

- Date: May
- Location: Saskatoon, Saskatchewan, Canada
- Event type: Road
- Distance: Marathon
- Established: 1979
- Website: www.saskmarathon.ca

The Saskatchewan Marathon is an annual marathon (42.195 km/26.219 mi) race in Saskatoon, Saskatchewan, Canada. The race has usually been held each year since 1979 and is a Boston Marathon qualifying event.

== History ==
The first Saskatchewan Marathon was run May 12, 1979. During the first two years, the marathon was held in May, however the date of the marathon was moved to October in 1981. The marathon continued to be run in the Fall until 2004, when it was moved to May in order to avoid competition in the Queen City Marathon in Regina, Saskatchewan. It has been held in May ever since.

In 2010 the event had a total participation of 2,797 runners, including: 159 runners in the Marafun, 1,404 in the 10 km, 1,287 in the Half-Marathon, and 247 in the Marathon.

The 2020 in-person edition of the race was cancelled due to the coronavirus pandemic, with all registrants given the option of running the race virtually or obtaining a 70% refund.

== Course ==
The Marathon courses have started and ended at a number of different locations since its inaugural event.

All of the events have included the extensive portion along the South Saskatchewan River, including the east bank section from Ruth Street north to the Traffic Bridge and the west bank section from the Traffic Bridge north to Whiteswan Drive and beyond.

A number of courses have included starts and finishes at Griffiths Stadium on the campus of the University of Saskatchewan, as well as portions of the course along roadways on the campus. The event in 2006 featured a start and finish at the east end of the Bowl, by the historic College Building. The various routes have been determined by a number of factors, including: road and bridge closures and construction, City and University approval and support, as well as the factors involved in choosing the location of the start/finish line. Extensive lobbying has occurred to develop a route which can remain unchanged from year to year, but that has proved impossible to do. The start/finish area is now at Diefenbaker Park and incorporates a river crossing on the South Circle Drive Bridge.

For years, the course has been sanctioned by the Saskatchewan Athletics Association.

== Other races ==
During the event, various distances are available:

- marathon
- Half marathon
- 10 km race
- Marafun (children's race)

== See also ==
- List of marathon races in North America
