= Fort Lauderdale A1A Marathon =

The Ft. Lauderdale A1A marathon and Half Marathon began in 2006 when it was founded by Steve Tebon and Exclusive Sports Marketing. Chris Carusone, race director, was responsible for creating, permitting and managing the event in 2006 & 2007. Since then, it has grown to field more than 4,500 participants from over 40 US states and 12 countries to become one of the premier events in the state of Florida. The race is currently a Boston qualifier.

== History ==
The inaugural marathon, run on February 19, 2006, featured 332 runners, and was won by local Miami resident, Gabriel Rodriguez, in 2:39:05.

=== Human interest stories ===
In February 2023 Adam Gorlitsky set a Guinness World Record for fastest half-marathon using a robotic walking device. Gorlitsky, a paralyzed man, used a Rewalk ekoskelton to complete the half-marathon.

== List of winners ==
=== Marathon ===
Year	Men's winner	Time (h:m:s)	Women's winner	Time (h:m:s)
2024	Logan Howard (USA)	2:30:22	Kaila Proulx (USA)	2:52:16
2019	Ross Lenehan (USA)	2:41:42	Kaitlyn Kelly (USA)	3:06:57
2018	Timothy Reimink (USA)	2:45:17	Brenna Merrill (USA)	3:08:48
2017	Kevin Brown (USA)	2:41:25	Erica Lech (USA)	3:10:32
2016	Bryan Huberty (USA)	2:36:44	Florencia Morales (USA)	2:54:45
2015	Ricky Montez (USA)	2:51:42	Julia Grechinenko (UKR)	3:02:29
2014	Janez Maroevic (CRO)	2:41:18	Elina Junnila (FIN)	2:51:27
2013	Tim McDuffee (USA)	2:40:41	Pamela Manely (USA)	3:00:18
2012	Tom Beekhuysen (USA)	2:54:13	Lisa Wessels (CAN)	3:10:48
2011	Jonathan Volpi (USA)	2:36:35	Carrie Pustilnik (USA)	3:00:11
2010	Bryan Huberty (USA)	2:44:02	Carrie Pustilnik (USA)	2:58:30
2009	Antonio Sousa (POR)	2:26:22	Mari Lee Baxter (USA)	3:24:10
2008	John Roberts (USA)	2:50:31	Cynthia Anderson (USA)	3:07:02
2007	Joel Cardoso (MEX)	2:54:32	Fiona Bilodeau (USA)	3:13:05
2006	Gabriel Rodríguez (USA)	2:39:05	Syl Corbett (USA)	3:09:23

=== Half marathon ===
Year	Men's winner	Time (h:m:s)	Women's winner	Time (h:m:s)
2024	Logan Broadbent (USA)	1:16:38	Erin Edminister (USA)	1:22:08
2019	Samuel Luttier (USA)	1:14:58	Melissa Perlman (USA)	1:24:50
2018	Jack McAfee (USA)	1:12:28	Rebecca O'Hanley (USA)	1:22:57
2017	Santiago Ascenso (BRA)	1:14:14	Ariane Monticeli (BRA)	1:21:01
2016	Fabian Anrig (SWI)	1:11:44	Emily Ney (USA)	1:26:42
2015	Mike Korir (KEN)	1:11:06	Nicole Chyr (USA)	1:21:01
2014	Soekeer Fajardo (CUB)	1:15:10	Maria Morales (ARG)	1:22:39
2013	Evan Dehart (USA)	1:12:20	Erika Huerta (USA)	1:21:17
2012	Mike Fisher (USA)	1:09:38	Maria Morales (USA)	1:26:09
2011	Anton Van Zyl (RSA)	1:13:31	Jennifer Jones (USA)	1:26:41
2010	Anton Van Zyl (RSA)	1:14:55	Jennifer Jones (USA)	1:27:09
2009	Jason Bodnar (USA)	1:11:43	Janine Peart (USA)	1:26:50
2008	Anton Van Zyl (RSA)	1:14:45	Amy Schneeberg (CAN)	1:26:46
2007	Anton Van Zyl (RSA)	1:11:42	Eilleen Turrene (USA)	1:25:36
2006	Anton Van Zyl (RSA)	1:12:16	Janine Peart (USA)	1:26:11

== See also ==
- List of marathon races in North America
