= Tallahassee Marathon =

Annual race in the United States held since 1975

- Date: February
- Location: Tallahassee, Florida, U.S.
- Event type: Road
- Distance: Marathon
- Established: 1975 (51 years ago)
- Course records: Men: 2:19:11 (2015); Mark Chepses; Women: 2:40:06 (2012); Leah Thorvilson
- Website: tallahasseemarathon.com
- Participants: 172 finishers (2020)

The Tallahassee Marathon is a marathon held in Tallahassee, the state capital of Florida, since 1975.

This race is a USATF certified course and an official qualifier for the Boston Marathon.

== History ==
The marathon was first held in 1975 with just two participants.

The 2021 edition of the race was cancelled due to the coronavirus pandemic.

The 2024 race included over 1,600 participants from 21 states and six countries.

Top repeat champions of the race are Tamara Kozulina with six titles among females and Bryan Morseman with five wins in the male division.

== Course ==
The race starts in Downtown, moves through the Midtown district and through Myers Park. Later, the course passes Cascade Park and the Florida State University campus.

== Winners ==
=== Men's ===
Year	Winner	Country	Time	Notes
2000	Michael Peck	United States	2:46:53	
2001	David Yon	United States	2:57:25	
2002	Ronnie Godwin	United States	3:02:32	
2003	Michael Western	United States	2:50:32	
2004	Jack Mcdermott	United States	2:55:19	
2005	Jeff Dobias	United States	2:43:38	
2006	Michael Douma	United States	2:51:58	
2007	Judson Cake	United States	2:28:15	
2008	Scott Mullins	United States	2:24:00	
2009	George Towett	United States	2:20:30	
2010	James Cheruiyot	United States	2:26:50	
2011	Esteban Vanegas	United States	2:28:38	
2012	Solomon Kandie	United States	2:27:23	
2013	Chris Zablocki	United States	2:23:25	
2014	Bryan Morseman	United States	2:24:26	
2015	Mark Chepses	United States	2:19:11	
2016	Kennedy Kemei	United States	2:31:33	
2017	Bryan Morseman	United States	2:27:11	
2018	Bryan Morseman	United States	2:26:55	
2019	Chris Zablocki	United States	2:34:41	
2020	Bryan Morseman	United States	2:25:59	
2021	COVID-19 pandemic	CANCELLED		
2022	Bryan Morseman	United States	2:28:45	
2023	Hisato Suetsugu	Japan	2:33:22	
2024	Philip Quillen	United States	2:34:45	
2025	Dylan Gearinger	United States	2:25:31	
2026	Andrew Taylor	United States	2:29:59	

=== Women's ===
Year	Winner	Country	Time	Notes
2004	Kim Bruce	United States	3:18:18	
2005	Lisa Purul	United States	3:24:24	
2006	Teresa Lafleur	United States	3:32:11	
2007	Valerie Gortmaker	United States	2:46:08	
2008	Tamara Kozulina	Ukraine	3:03:37	
2009	Nina Kraft	United States	2:45:06	
2010	Beth Moras	United States	3:18:32	
2011	Karen Harvey	United States	2:43:33	
2012	Leah Thorvilson	United States	2:40:06	
2013	Nina Kraft	United States	2:52:46	
2014	Esther Erb	United States	2:46:28	
2015	Sarah Crouch	United States	2:46:58	
2016	Tamara Kozulina	Ukraine	3:03:19	
2017	Tamara Kozulina	Ukraine	3:09:25	
2018	Tamara Kozulina	Ukraine	3:03:10	
2019	Tamara Kozulina	Ukraine	3:04:00	
2020	Debbie Greig	Scotland	2:58:53	
2021	COVID-19 pandemic	CANCELLED		
2022	Tamara Kozulina	Ukraine	3:24:14	
2023	Purity Munene	Kenya	2:51:31	
2024	Gabrielle Suver	United States	2:54:08	
2025	Gabrielle Suver	United States	2:54:03	
2026	Neomi Chapelin	United States	3:13:39	

== See also ==
- List of marathon races in North America
