= Marathon by the Sea =

Race held in New Brunswick, Canada (1995–2022)

- Date: August
- Location: Saint John, New Brunswick
- Event type: Road Race
- Distance: Marathon
- Established: 1995, 31 years ago
- Last held: 2022
- Website: https://www.marathonbythesea.com

Marathon by the Sea was an annual marathon (42.195 km/26.219 mi) race held in Saint John, New Brunswick, Canada from 1995 to 2022. The race was a Boston Marathon qualifier, with 17 of the 77 runners qualifying in the 2012 edition of the run. The race was held in early August, but due to Saint John's coastal climate the marathon was known for its cool temperatures in spite of the summer season. The marathon was given a multi-page feature in Runner's World magazine, which called it "A race with a big heart and a warm smile -- and a perfect late-summer spot on the calendar... just right if you're looking for a break from the heat down south."

== Events ==
Although the marquee event for Marathon by the Sea was a full marathon race, it also featured a half-marathon, 5K, 10K and kids' run.

== Course ==
The original Marathon by the Sea course began and ended in uptown Saint John, in the heart of the city. In 2010, the route was changed; from then on it would begin and end at Rockwood Park in the city's North End.

The marathon course began at the Lily Lake pavilion at Rockwood Park before looping around the South End of the city. The course then headed back to the North End briefly before entering the West Side of the city via the Reversing Falls Bridge. After crossing the bridge, the course became a lengthy in-and-out run, crossing the West Side and running into Lorneville. After the turnaround point the race, continued back through the West Side of the city, crossing the reversing falls bridge again and entering the city's North End before heading back to Lily Lake.

== Challenges ==
In 2013 Marathon by the Sea, the Fredericton Marathon and Moncton's Legs for Literacy Marathon formed the Tri-City Run. Runners in each of these events, regardless of the distance they ran, received medals that can be combined to form a "mega-medal" known as the "Tri-City Medallion." The June 2013 edition of iRun listed the Tri-City run as one of Canada's unique races.

In 2014 the Miramichi Rock 'n' Run race was added to these three races, forming the "New Brunswick Challenge." Runners completing a race at all four events will receive the New Brunswick challenge medal.

== See also ==
- List of marathon races in North America
