= Akron Marathon =

- Date: Last Saturday in September
- Location: Akron, Ohio
- Event type: Road
- Distance: Marathon
- Established: 2003
- Course records: Men: 2:15:59 (2013); Getachew Askaw; Women: 2:39:09 (2005); Maria Portilla

The Akron Marathon is a marathon located in Akron, Ohio. It is typically held in September.

The race was first run in 2003. It played host to the North American Men's Marathon Relay Championships in its first two years. The 2024 event will take place on September 28 with the marathon, half marathon, and marathon team relay. The race routes have changed several times since its beginning, and is generally considered a challenging course through Akron's scenic neighborhoods.

In 2015, the Akron Marathon Race Series was launched with the addition of two separate events. The Acme Fresh Market Foundation 8k and 1 mile races are held near the University of Akron on the last Saturday in June. The Goodyear Half Marathon and 10k is held near the Goodyear Headquarters on the second Saturday in August.

== List of winners ==
Key: Course record (in bold)

=== Men ===
Year	Winner	Country	Time	Notes
2003	Jonah Rono	Kenya	2:21:59	
2004	Andrey Gordeyev	Belarus	2:22:20	
2005	Charles Kamindo	Kenya	2:18:47	
2006	Alene Reta	Ethiopia	2:22:02	
2007	Joshua Koros	Kenya	2:28:05	
2008	Birhanu Wukaw Zeleke	Ethiopia	2:23:13	
2009	Richard Chelimo	Kenya	2:27:21	
2010	Geoffrey Kiprotich	Kenya	2:19:34	
2011	Peter Kemboi	Kenya	2:22:46	
2012	Richard Kessio	Kenya	2:18:51	
2013	Getachew Asfaw	Ethiopia	**2:15:59**	Event Record
2014	Teklu Deneke	Ethiopia	2:16:45	
2015	Teklu Deneke	Ethiopia	2:22:21	Second Victory
2016	Tony Migliozzi	United States	2:21:41	
2017	Blair Teal	United States	2:23:39	
2018	Israel Merkle	United States	2:26:25	Akron Resident
2019	Caleb Hoover	United States	2:25:33	
2020	Virtual event due to COVID-19.			
2021	Nick Stricklen	United States	2:25:07	Akron Resident
2022	Zachary Hoagland	United States	2:25:57	
2023	Dylan Garritano	United States	2:25:06	Akron Resident
2024	Aaron Davidson	United States	2:25:30	
2025	Aaron Davidson	United States	2:18:59	Second Victory
2026	Zach Kreft	United States	2:18:06	

=== Women's ===
Year	Winner	Country	Time	Notes
2003	Brenda Bowden	United States	3:13:21	
2004	Elene Orleva	Russia	2:40:20	
2005	María Portillo	Peru	**2:39:09**	Event Record
2006	Leteyesus Berhe	Ethiopia	2:55:23	
2007	Melissa Rittenhouse	United States	2:52:31	
2008	Sarah Plaxton	United States	2:57:56	
2009	Hirut Manderfro	Ethiopia	2:51:59	
2010	Ludmila Stepanova	Russia	2:42:33	
2011	Becki Michael	United States	2:45:57	
2012	Shanna Ailes Istnick	United States	2:55:09	
2013	Ludmila Stepanova	Russia	2:39:18	Second Victory
2014	Tezata Dengersa	Turkey	2:42:53	
2015	Irina Alexandrova	Russia	2:39:55	
2016	Becki Spellman	United States	2:51:34	Second Victory
2017	Emma McCarron	United States	2:52:28	
2018	Grace McCarron	United States	2:51:11	
2019	Lizzie Gleason	United States	2:47:27	
2020	Virtual event due to COVID-19.			
2021	Teresa Ferguson	United States	3:18:45	
2022	Alysia Rogers	United States	2:49:14	
2023	Joanna Line	United States	2:52:01	
2024	Maura Lemon	United States	2:52:36	
2025	Ashton Swinford	United States	2:51:24	
2026	Andrea Klima	United States	2:42:06	

Full results for each year are available from Marathon Guide.

== See also ==
- List of marathon races in North America
