= Riverfront Trail, Greater Moncton =

Multiuse trail in New Brunswick, Canada

Riverfront Trail
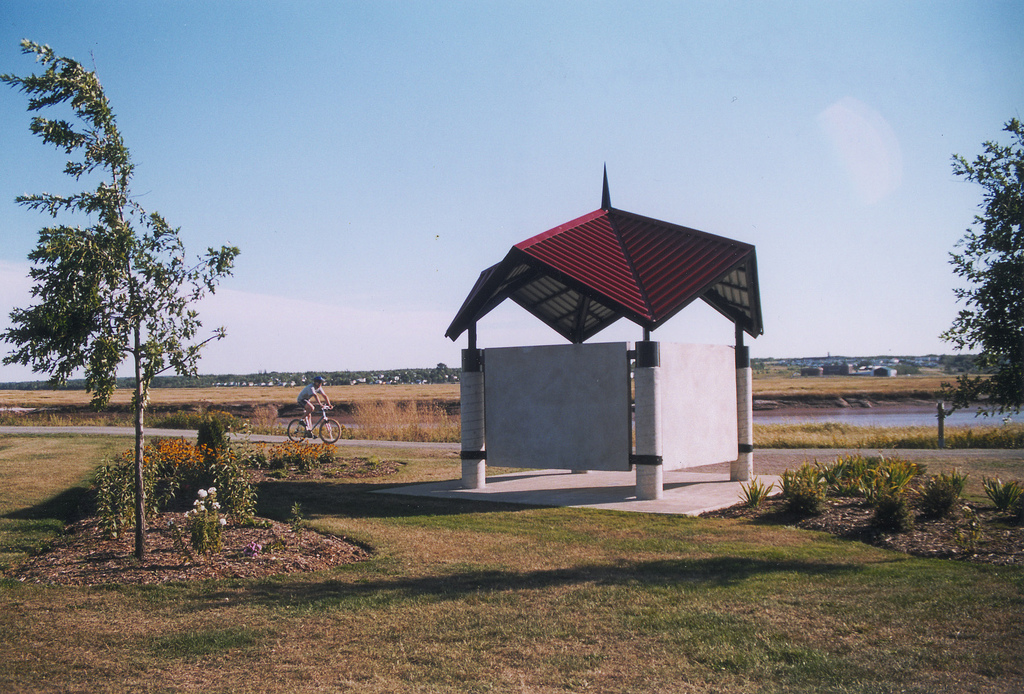
- Riverfront Trail pavilion in Dieppe, New Brunswick
- Interactive map of Riverfront Trail
- Type: Urban park
- Location: Moncton, New Brunswick
- Coordinates: 46.0851°N 64.7756°W
- Status: Open all year

The Riverfront Trail is a multiuse trail in Greater Moncton, along the shores of the Petitcodiac River. The trail comprises the Moncton section of the Trans Canada Trail, passing through the city's Riverfront Park, and extends to the neighbouring communities of Riverview and Dieppe. Points of interest include Bore View Park, Settlers Green, a skateboard park, the Hal Betts Commemorative Sportsplex and the Treitz Haus.

The trail, along with several Moncton streets, is used annually for Legs For Literacy, a Boston Marathon qualifying race also featuring a half marathon, 10km, and 5km.

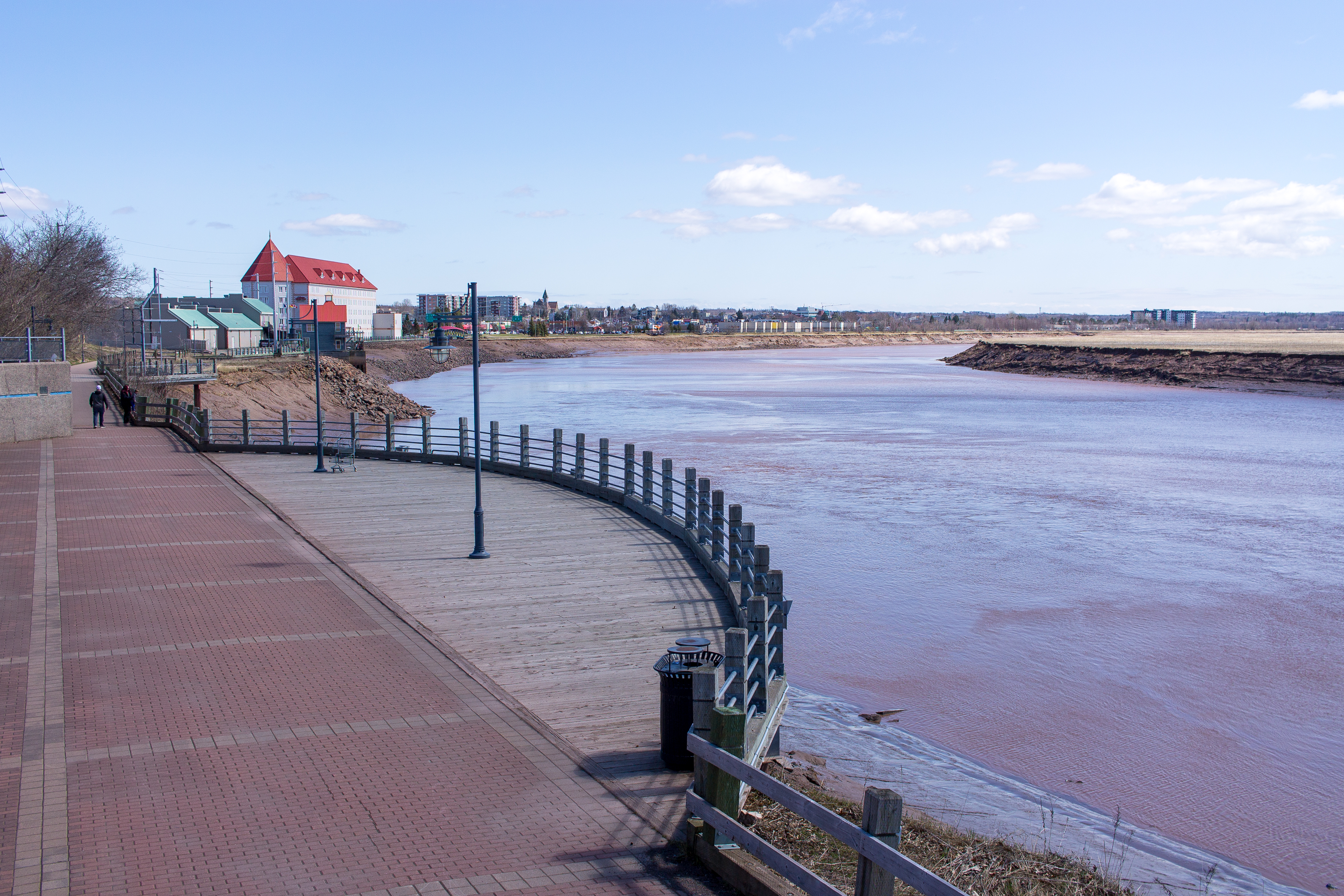
Lookout on the Riverfront Trail in Moncton, New Brunswick.

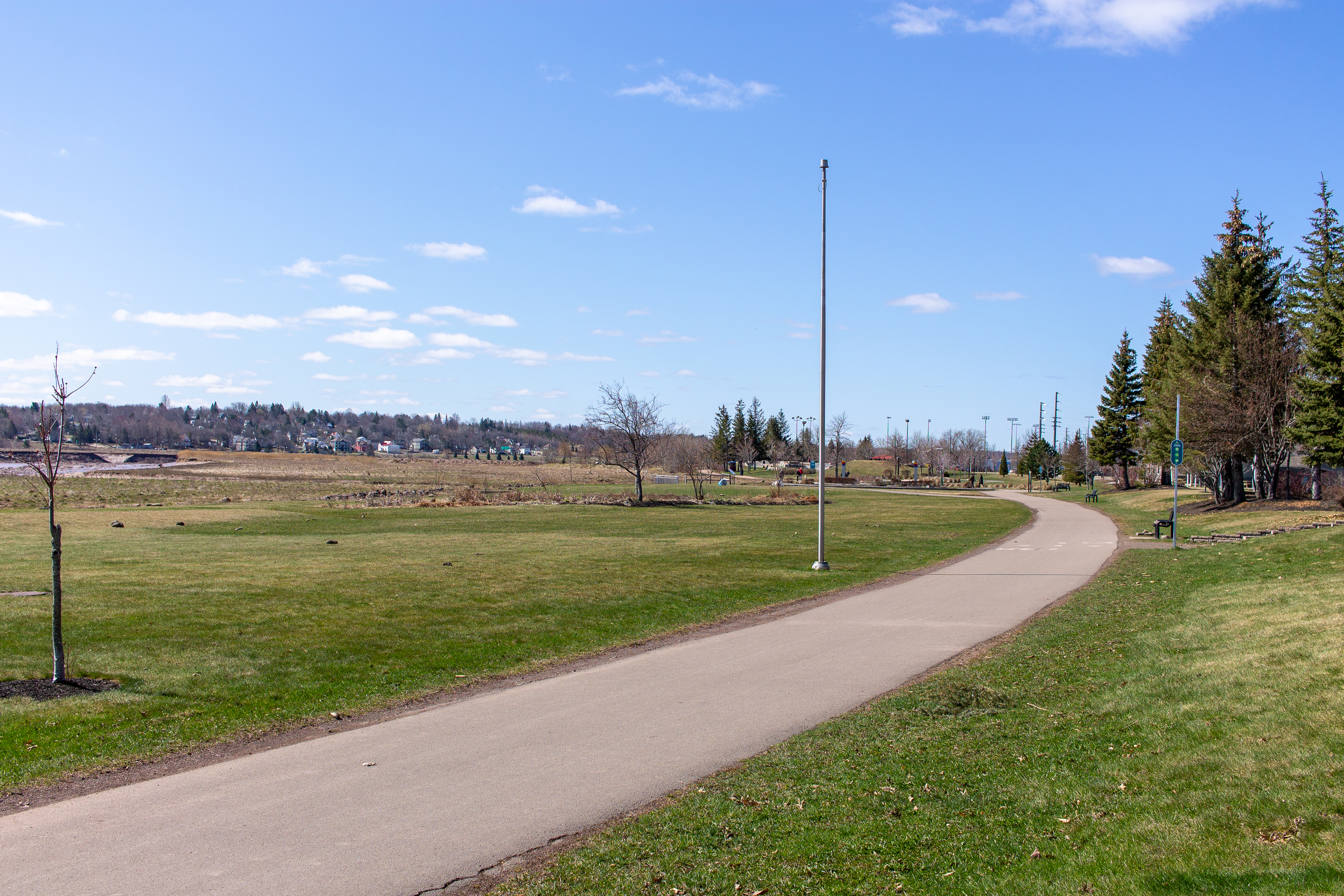
A paved portion of the trail, downtown Moncton

== See also ==
- List of events in Greater Moncton
