= Great New York State Marathon =

Annual marathon event in New York

- Date: October
- Location: Syracuse, NY
- Event type: Road/Trail
- Distance: Marathon
- Established: 2011
- Course records: 2:38:49 (men); 3:00:13 (women)
- Website: www.greatnewyorkstatemarathon.org

The Great New York State Marathon is an annual marathon 26.2-mile (42.2 km) held each October in Syracuse, New York. The first running of the race, previously known as the Empire State Marathon, was on October 16, 2011. The marathon course has been certified by the USATF. In spring of 2021, the race was purchased by Kelleigh's Cause, a 501(c)(3) charity dedicated to raising funds for medical research and awareness for the rare disease Arteriovenous Malformations, with the intention of becoming a charity fundraising race. The marathon took on its current name following purchase. It consists of a weekend of races, including a 5K and 10K on Saturday, and a half and full marathon on Sunday, that start near the New York State Fairgrounds and loops around Onondaga Lake.

In addition to the Great New York State Marathon, Kelleigh's Cause also hosts a 5K/10K in July, also near Onondaga Lake in Syracuse.

== Winners ==
Course record

Edition	Year	Date	Men's winner	Time (h:m:s)	Women's winner	Time (h:m:s)	Results
1st	2011	October 16	Nick Bedbury (USA)	2:43:07	Emily Piza-Taylor (USA)	3:10:22	
2nd	2012	October 21	Scott Ulberg (USA)	2:38:49	Heidi Baumbach (USA)	3:13:12	
3rd	2013	October 20	Dave Cook (USA)	2:39:17	Jenn Cronin (USA)	3:02:02	
4th	2014	October 19	J. Matthew Medeiros (USA)	2:42:34	Rachel Karmen (USA)	3:13:27	
5th	2015	October 18	Connor Rosenblatt (USA)	2:46:09	Bailey Drewes (USA)	3:06:29	
6th	2016	October 9	Jake Gillette (USA)	2:42:44	Alicia Eno (USA)	3:19:50	
7th	2017	October 8	Mike Bersani (USA)	2:56:25	Lillian Meaney (USA)	3:17:01	
8th	2018	October 14	Richard Wing (USA)	2:42:40	Siena Anstis (USA)	3:00:13	
9th	2019	October 13	Nicholas Murgia (USA)	2:53:36	Anastasia Semel (USA)	3:16:22	
