= Duke City Marathon =

Annual race in the United States held since 2012

- Date: October
- Location: Albuquerque, New Mexico, US
- Event type: Road
- Distance: Marathon
- Primary sponsor: Big 5 Sporting Goods
- Established: 1984 (42 years ago)
- Website: https://www.dukecitymarathon.com/
- Participants: 482 finishers (2024)

The Duke City Marathon is an annual 42.195-kilometre (26.219 mi) race held in Albuquerque, New Mexico, US. Established in 1984, the Duke City marathon is the state's premier running event and one of the longest-running marathons in the Southwest. The course is a USATF certified full marathon serves as a Boston Qualifying Race. The Duke City marathon weekend events also include a marathon relay, half marathon, 10k and 5k. The Duke City Marathon was initiated in 1984 by then-Mayor Harry Kinney alongside the 15th Duke of Albuquerque, who traveled from Madrid, Spain to participate in race day festivities.

== Course ==
The course starts and ends in Mayor Kinney Civic Plaza in downtown Albuquerque and follows a scenic route along the Rio Grande. As a high-elevation race, the start and finish lines are situated approximately 5,000 feet above sea level. Participants must complete the course within the official time limit of 6 hours and 30 minutes.

== Winners ==
Date	Time	Men's winner	Time	Women's winner
2024	2:31:37	Alexander Wilson (USA)	3:29:54	Julia Andreas (USA)
2023	2:36:27	Zachary Alhamra (USA)	3:06:13	Amber Lee Crane Arvidson (USA)
2022	2:37:48	Corey Purcella (USA)	2:59:34	Sarah Jones (USA)
2021	2:42:47	Paul Lefrancois (USA)	3:02:34	Erin Wagner (USA)
2020	Cancelled due to COVID 19 pandemic			
2016	2:31:21	Solomon Kandie (USA)	2:58:15	Ruth Senior (GBR)
2015	2:26:15	Solomon Kandie (USA)	3:10:15	Sonya Lucatero (USA)
2014	2:41:36	Gary Krugger (USA)	3:15:54	Stefanie Tierney (USA)
