= Earth Day Challenge Marathon =

The Earth Day Challenge Marathon was a marathon, 26.2-mile (42.2 km), that was held each April in Gambier, Ohio. A half-marathon, 13.1-mile (21.1 km), was held in conjunction with the marathon. In 2010, 121 runners completed the marathon and 266 runners completed the half marathon.

== The course ==
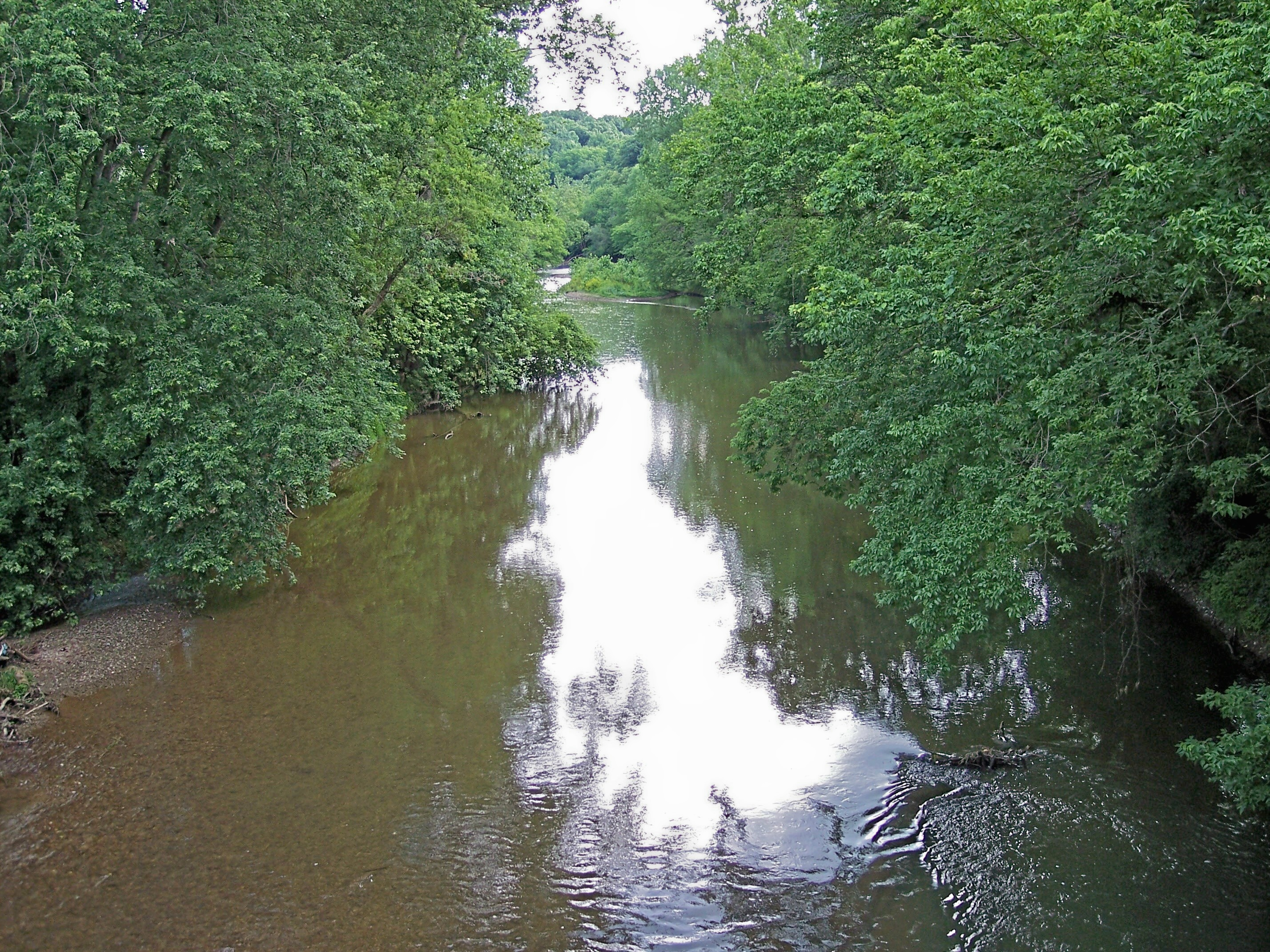
The Kokosing River as viewed from the Kokosing Gap Trail near Gambier

The course began and ended at the Kenyon Athletic Center on the campus of Kenyon College. It was a mostly flat course with one fairly steep hill at the ½ mile point. Runners completed a four-mile loop through Gambier before heading to the Kokosing Gap Trail along the Kokosing River for the out-and-back leg comprising the remainder of the race.

The course was certified by the USATF and results could be used to qualify for the Boston Marathon.

== History ==
The first Earth Day Challenge Marathon was held in 2007 and was run annually through 2012. In 2013 the full marathon was cancelled, but the half marathon was still held. The half marathon continued through 2017. The half marathon was cancelled in 2018 and no race has been held since.
