= Surfside Beach Marathon =

The Surfside Beach Marathon and Half Marathon is held in the Village of Surfside Beach, Texas each February. The first run was in 2005.

The race is held on the Surfside public beach, along the Gulf of Mexico, from Surfside to San Luis Pass and back again. The beach is largely undeveloped and extremely hill covered with hard packed, smooth sand. Since it is one of the only marathons in the world run entirely on sand, runners have joined from all over the country and even as far away as Ethiopia, Japan, and Uruguay.

Running on sand may result in slower times, approximately 30 seconds per mile more than the your usual pace, but others say the sand is easier than pavement running and great for long runs. In 2007, Stephen Baumgartner was the first runner to break the 3 hour mark finishing in 2 hours, 55 minutes, and 44 seconds.

The race begins and ends at the Stahlman Park pavilion on the beach. After the race, a post-race party is held at the scenic park, overlooking the gulf, with plenty of Texas-style BBQ available.

== Features ==
Each year both the full and half races feature:

- Miles of uninterrupted, peaceful beach
- Unique shirt to commemorate the event
- Event stone drink coasters
- Custom designed finisher medals
- Imaginative age group awards
- Texas-style BBQ after the event
- Friendly helpful volunteers
- All the sand you can carry home in your shoes!

Surfside Beach is approximately 60 miles (97 km) South of Houston down Highway 288.

The marathon is sponsored by OverNite Software and ConocoPhillips.
