= Williams Route 66 Marathon =

Road running event in Tulsa, Oklahoma

- Date: November
- Location: Tulsa, Oklahoma, United States
- Event type: Road
- Distance: Marathon
- Established: 2001
- Website: Williams Route 66 Marathon

The Williams Route 66 Marathon is a race in Tulsa, Oklahoma, which has been running since 2006.

The marathon is organised by volunteers, with proceeds going towards the Tulsa Area United Way.

On November 22, 2009, Zac Freudenburg won the Guinness World Record for marathon running while pushing a stroller. His final time was 2 hours 32 minutes 10 seconds, ahead of second placed Michael Wardian at 2 hours 34 minutes 37 seconds. Wardian had previously set the record two years earlier with his son Pierce.

The route includes Downtown Tulsa and Riverside Drive.
