= Blue Nose Marathon =

Road marathon in Halifax, Canada

Coordinates: 44.6450°N 63.5786°W

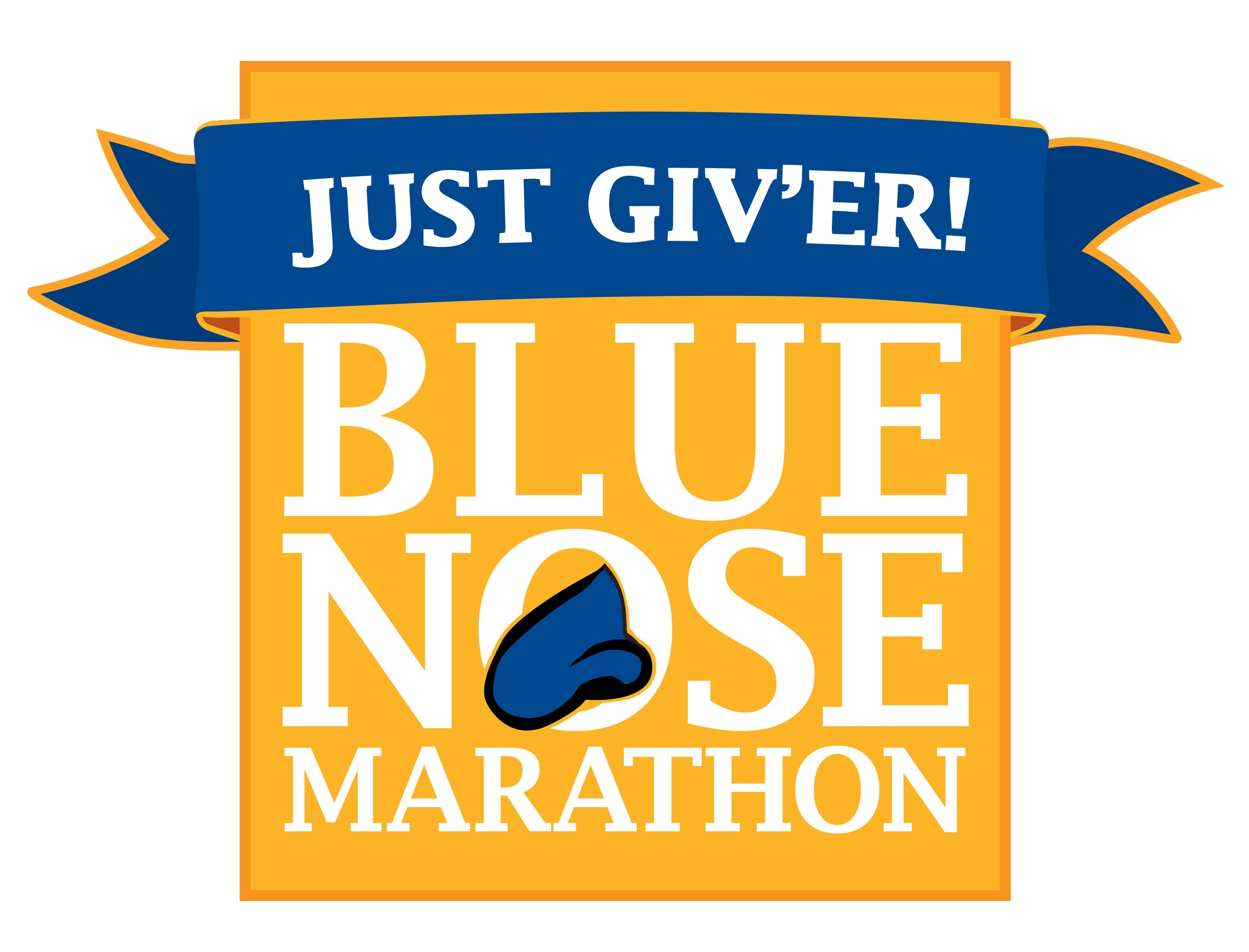
- Date: May
- Location: Halifax, Nova Scotia, Canada
- Event type: Road
- Distance: Marathon
- Established: 2004, 22 years ago
- Website: http://www.bluenosemarathon.com/

The Blue Nose Marathon is a charity road marathon that has been held each spring in Halifax since 2004.

This marathon is a standard length at 26.2 miles (42.2 km). Since its inception, abbreviated runs are also available including a youth run (2k and 4k), 5k, 10k, 13.1-mile (21.1 km) half marathon, and a team relay, each sponsored by different local sponsors.

== History ==
The marathon was first held in 2004.

In 2005, despite unexpected heavy rain and strong winds, officials were able to reroute the course to avoid dangerous areas, such as a bridge crossing and flooded areas, and started the race with only a one-hour delay.

The 2020 in-person edition of the race was cancelled due to the coronavirus pandemic.

== Course ==
External image
- Course map of Full Marathon in 2024

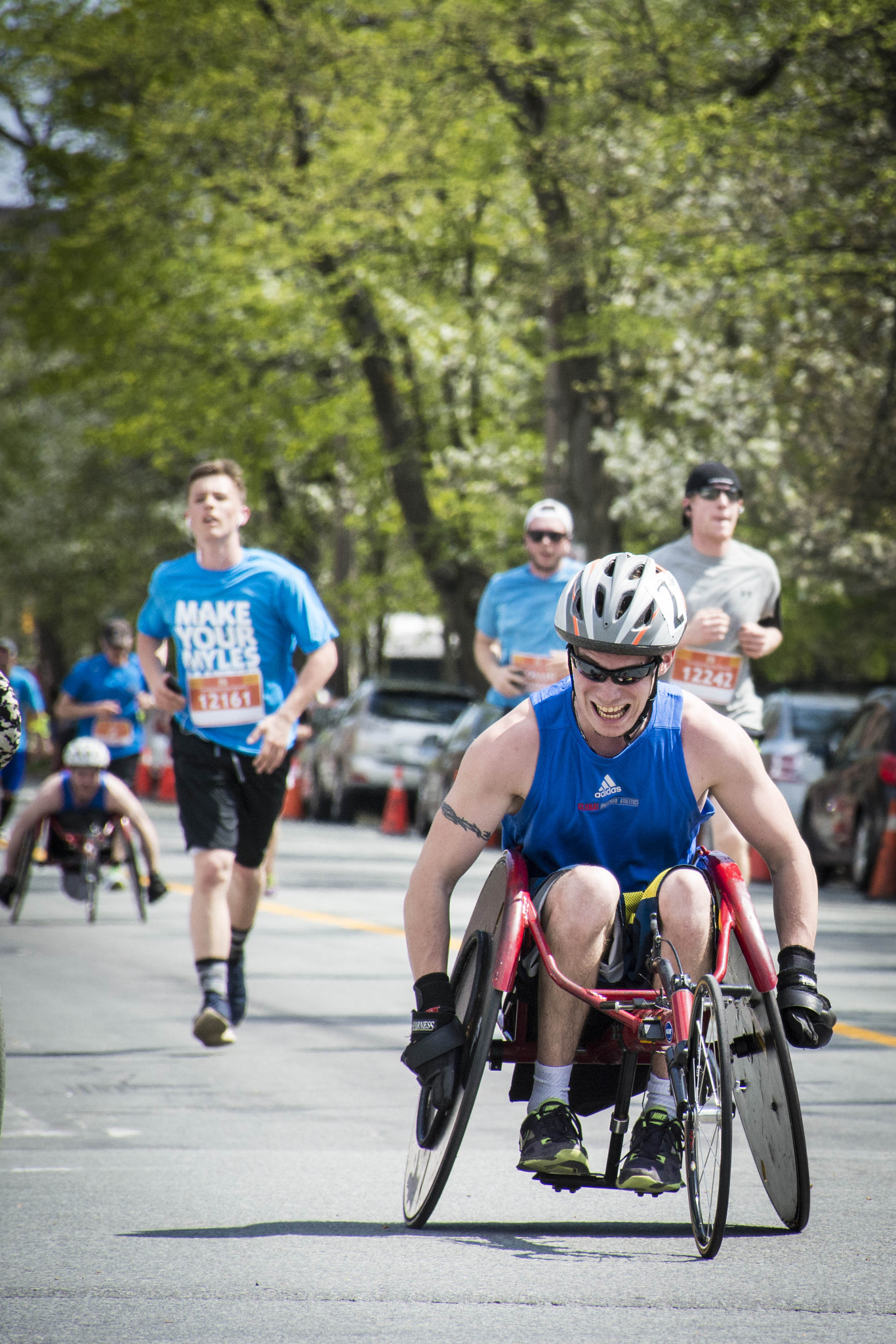
Blue Nose Marathon in 2016

Set within the Halifax-Dartmouth city confines, the Blue Nose Marathon includes a path around Lake Banook and Lake Micmac, crossing Halifax's Macdonald Bridge, and a run through Point Pleasant Park on the south-end Halifax peninsula. All seven events start and finish at the same points, with different courses to accommodate the seven distances.

== Sponsors ==
Each race has its own sponsor each year, current sponsors include:

- Medavie (Title Sponsor)
- Half Marathon
- 10K
- Purple Cow (5K)
- Doctors Nova Scotia (Youth Run)
- Strum Consulting (Team Relay)

== See also ==
- List of marathon races in North America
