= Baystate Marathon =

Annual marathon in Lowell, Massachusetts

- Date: October
- Location: Lowell, MA
- Event type: Marathon, half marathon, half marathon relay
- Established: 1990

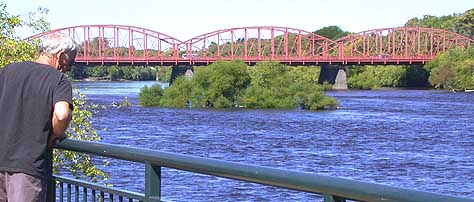
A man on the waterfront of downtown Lowell, Massachusetts examines the Merrimack River near the final bridge of the Baystate Marathon course.

The Baystate Marathon is a marathon held in the city of Lowell, Massachusetts every October. It was first run in 1990 and has been run every year since. The course is known as one of the flattest and fastest marathon courses in the northeastern United States. The race runs along the Merrimack River and crosses different bridges spanning this river. In 2023, it had the 18th highest qualifying percentage for the Boston Marathon at 25.1 percent. Besides the marathon, there is also a half marathon and half marathon relay.

The race motto has been “For Runners, By Runners.” The Greater Lowell Road Runners use the funds that are raised from the race to fulfill the mission of promoting and encouraging the sport of running through road races, fun runs, group training activities, lectures and social events.
