= Medoc Trail Marathon =

Running event in North Carolina, United States

The Medoc Trail Marathon is a marathon, 42.195 kilometres (26.219 mi) in length, held each October at Medoc Mountain State Park in Hollister, North Carolina. The race is run on a ten-mile loop trail, with the second and third laps being run over a shorter version of the loop. The race is run in conjunction with a 10-mile run.

== History ==
In 2008 the inaugural Medoc Trail Marathon and 10-miler was held on October 4. The Rocky Mount Endurance Club launched a new trail event in Medoc Mountain State Park located in Hollister, North Carolina. In its first year, the 10-miler sold out.

In 2009 the Medoc Trail Marathon and 10-miler was held on October 17. The race size increased to accommodate more runners, but both events were expected to sell out early. The races were run in Medoc Mountain State Park located in Hollister, North Carolina.

During 2018 the race director decided to end the Marathon Event in favor of increasing number of runners for the 10 miler and created a new 5 miler.

== Location ==
Medoc Mountain State Park is an area of North Carolina with running trails. For an experienced trail runner, it is an easy trail. There are a few steep short climbs up the bluffs and a few gradual smaller hills, but a lot of flats along the creek.

== Race Director ==
The Medoc Trail Races are directed by the Rocky Mount Endurance Club, a non-profit running club founded in 2006 as a marathon training team.

== Races ==
=== Medoc 10-Miler ===
The Park is set up for a 10-mile (16 km) race. The race begins with a two-mile (3 km) stretch on park access roads before entering the trails. Aggressive racers looking for an age group victory, and newbies testing their legs on trails will enjoy this event. Participants receive a race shirt, food, and a finisher's medal.

=== Medoc Trail Marathon ===
The Medoc Marathon covers 42.195 kilometres (26.219 mi), beginning on park roads and then taking in three loops on the trails. Finishers of the marathon receive a race medal, long sleeve shirt, other race amenities including well supported aid stations, and food at the finish.

== Results ==
2008 Marathon Results:

Women 1st: Staci Inscore, Raleigh NC

Women 2nd: Kim Gilliam, Rocky Mount NC

Women 3rd: Aline Lloyd, Durham NC

Women Masters: Michele Lybarger, Irvington VA

Men 1st: Tim Surface, Raleigh NC

Men 2nd: Ronnie Weed, Chapel Hill NC

Men 3rd: Mark Rostan, Valdese NC

Men Masters:Bobby As well Jr., Cornelius NC
