= Green Mountain Marathon =

- Date: October
- Location: South Hero, Vermont, United States
- Event type: Road
- Distance: Marathon
- Website: Official Site

== History ==
According to the organizers the Green Mountain Marathon is held for runners by runners. Their goal is to offer runners a quality marathon at an affordable price in a relaxed setting.

The 40th annual marathon was held on October 17, 2010. The Green Mountain Athletic Association (GMAA) noted a record turnout of 516 runners with 416 finishing the race.

== Route ==
The certified course (VT09006RF) begins and ends near the house where Clarence H. Demar (7 time Boston Marathon Winner) once lived, is out and back on the west shore of South Hero and Grand Isle; a land of farms, apple orchards and summer cottages. The terrain is flat to rolling and about half dirt road (hard packed and well maintained). The island is sparsely populated; traffic will be minimal; expect the possibility of wind due to the race's close proximity to the lake.
