= El Paso Marathon =

Michelob ULTRA El Paso Marathon
- Date: February
- Location: El Paso, Texas
- Event type: Road
- Distance: Marathon
- Established: 2007
- Course records: Men: 2:33:53 Dylan Villescas (2015) Women: 2:55:13 Colleen Everett (2023)
- Website: http://www.elpasomarathon.org

The El Paso Marathon is an annual running event held in El Paso, Texas since 2007. It is an official Boston Marathon qualifier and includes a half marathon as well as a 5K race. It is organized by the non-profit El Paso Marathon Foundation. Over 3,000 runners participated in the 2019 Marathon, Half Marathon and 5K.

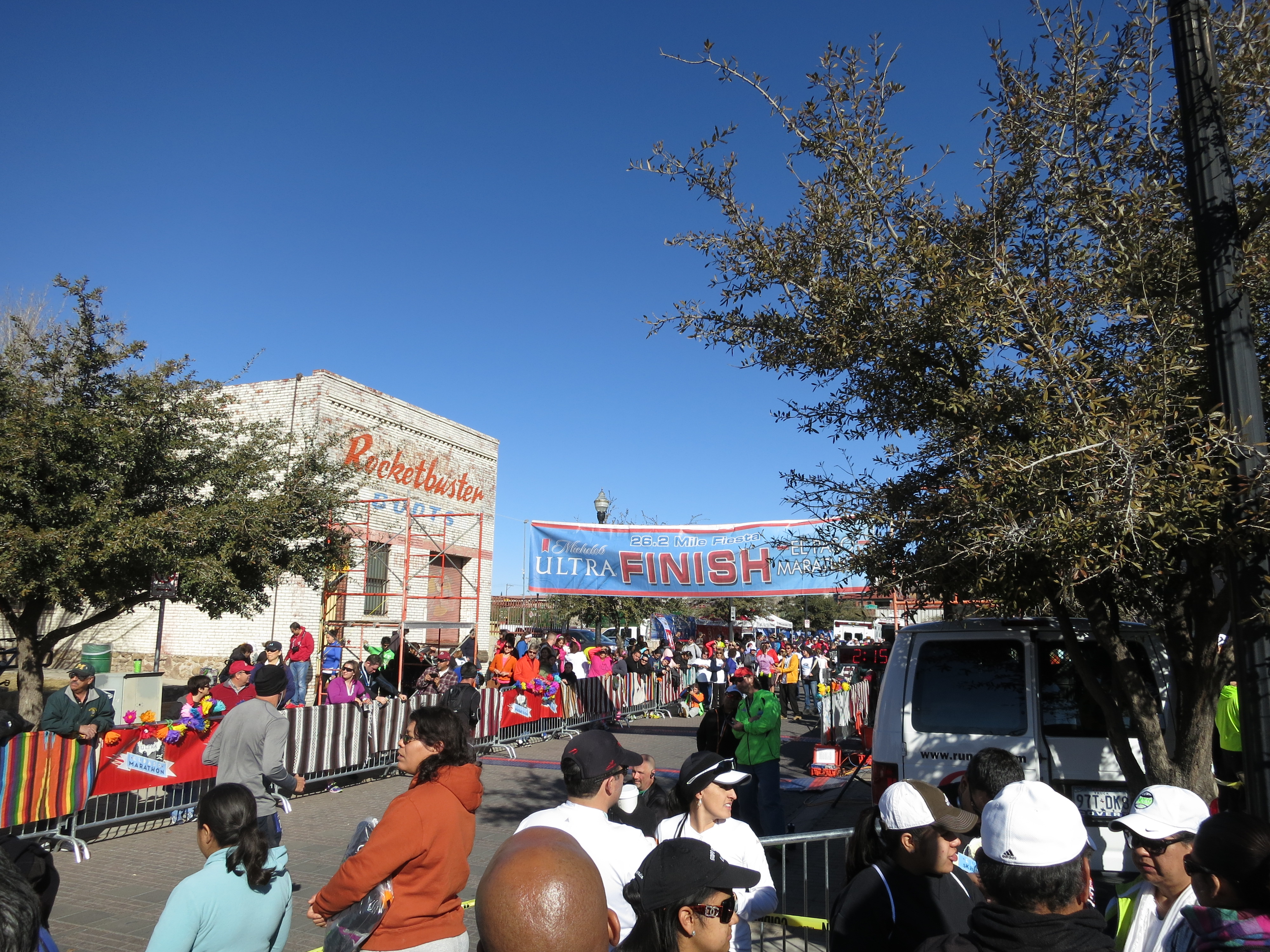
Finish line of the 2013 El Paso Marathon

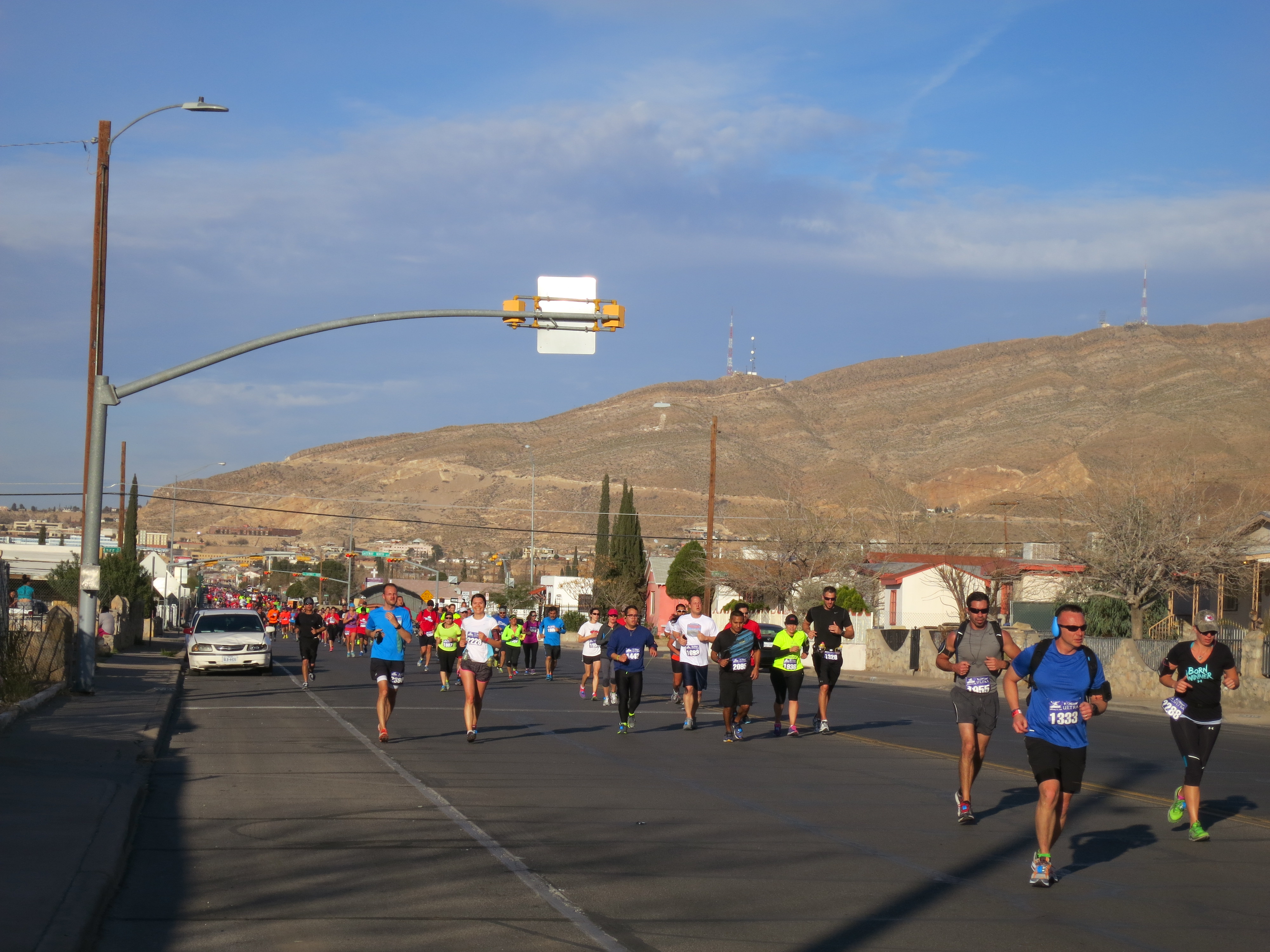
Along the route of the 2014 El Paso Half Marathon

== Course ==
When founded, the full marathon was a point to point race, which started at the top of Transmountain Road and ended at Union Plaza in Downtown El Paso. Elevation loss from start to finish is 1584 ft. A new course debuted in 2018 which starts and ends downtown at Southwest University Park.

The half marathon and 5K race start and finish on Anthony St. in front of Union Plaza Park.

== Marathon winners ==
The following is the list of marathon winners over the years:

Year	Men	Time	Women	Time	Finishers
2025	Derek Weber	2:46:55	Nina Lane	3:07:42	560
2024	Hector Falcon	2:38:03	Anais Arce	3:14:14	298
2023	Cole Shugart	2:35:20	Colleen Everett	2:55:13	238
2022	Drew Campbell	2:42:49	Sarah Strong	2:56:12	282
2021	-	-	-	-	-
2020	Billy Atkinson	3:01:51	Perla Retana	3:27:07	307
2019	Jose Corona	2:54:36	Jennifer Liechti	3:29:18	248
2018	Miguel Perez	2:54:06	Jesica Terrzas	3:27:38	259
2017	Samsom Mutua	2:43:26	Jamie Dawes	3:08:45	251
2016	Miguel Perez	2:47:11	Lauren Reasoner	3:15:11	314
2015	Dylan Villescas	2:33:53	Anita Perez	2:55:33	365
2014	Bashar Ibrahim	2:45:04	Catherine Camilletti	3:30:49	373
2013	Bashar Ibrahim	2:44:34	Larisa Pitchkolan	3:14:00	322
2012	Efrain Moreno	2:41:45	Larisa Pitchkolan	3:12:48	366
2011	Ronnie Hoppe	2:54:11	Larisa Pitchkolan	3:20:00	255
2010	Edgar Trillo	3:07:39	Larisa Pitchkolan	3:17:36	279
2009	Patrick Flores	2:55:11	Angie Song-Rooney	3:22:12	237
2008	Dirk Hendrik de Heer	2:43:54	Angie Song-Rooney	3:22:09	199
2007	-	-	-	-	n/a
