= Don Kern =

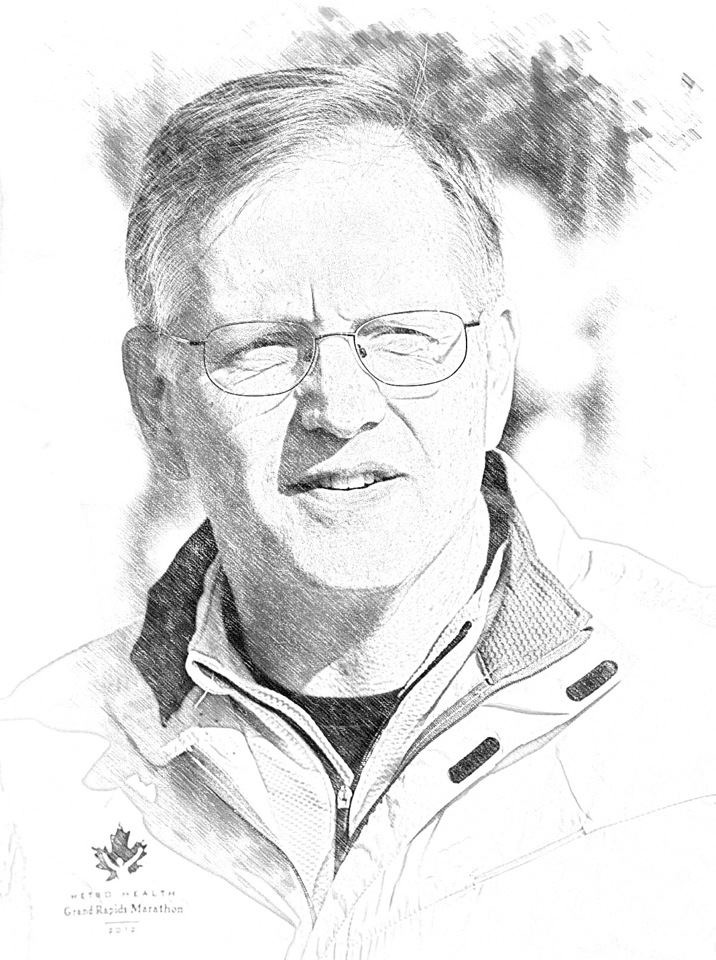
Grand Rapids Marathon founder and race director Don Kern

Don Kern is an adventure runner, IT Consultant, freelance writer, and the director of the Metro Health Grand Rapids Marathon. He has run 329 marathons or longer races, in each of fifty states of the USA three times, in thirty-two countries, and at the North Pole. On January 22, 2002, he also completed a half-marathon on the South Pole as a part of the Adventure Network's inaugural South Pole Marathon. In 2007 he embarked on a quest to set a world record by completing marathons on each of the seven continents in the shortest period of time, but while completing them in 35 days was beaten to the record by Richard Takata of Canada. A second attempt later in 2007 was unsuccessful as well, due to a delay of eight days en route to Antarctica. The record was finally broken by Kern on 1 December 2011 in 25 days, 18 hours, 10 minutes.

It was Kern’s third attempt at the record. In 2007 he tried to beat the then-record of 99 days with a 35-day schedule. Then, he found out Takata—who had run in four marathons with Kern during that time—had finished in less than 30 days, and Kern still had two marathons to remaining. Later that same year, Kern tried to finish in 25 days, but he got stuck in Punta Arenas, Chile, for eight days before his seventh and final run due to bad weather that prevented him from traveling to Antarctica. Kern did manage to run a marathon on all seven continents twice in a 307-day span.

Kern finally set the record starting on Nov. 6 in Soweto, South Africa, and then headed for Ticino, Switzerland, Curitiba, Brazil, Fukuchiyama, Japan, Westport, New Zealand, Cocoa, Fla., and finally Antarctica, near the Union Glacier. He ran the 183.4 total miles in about 45 total hours. His attempt was nearly derailed by a scheduling mixup in Japan and then he missed his flight to the U.S. in New Zealand. He managed to fly to Los Angeles, Calif., and found a red-eye that landed him in Orlando, Fla., the morning he would be running in Cocoa. Despite showing up for the race about 30 minutes late, Kern was able to continue his pursuit of the record, which would be his when he finished the Antarctic Ice Marathon on Dec. 1.

On February 2, 2013, he debuted the inaugural Groundhog Marathon in Grand Rapids, Mich. It featured a 4.4-mile loop that needed to be completed six times for a full marathon, a nod to the 1993 movie "Groundhog Day."

In July 2013, it was announced that Mascot Books would publish Kern's first book, "and the adventure continues ...." The book includes stories about Kern's running origins, the founding of the Grand Rapids Marathon and his three attempts to set a Guinness World Record.
