= Atlantic City Marathon =

Race in the United States of America

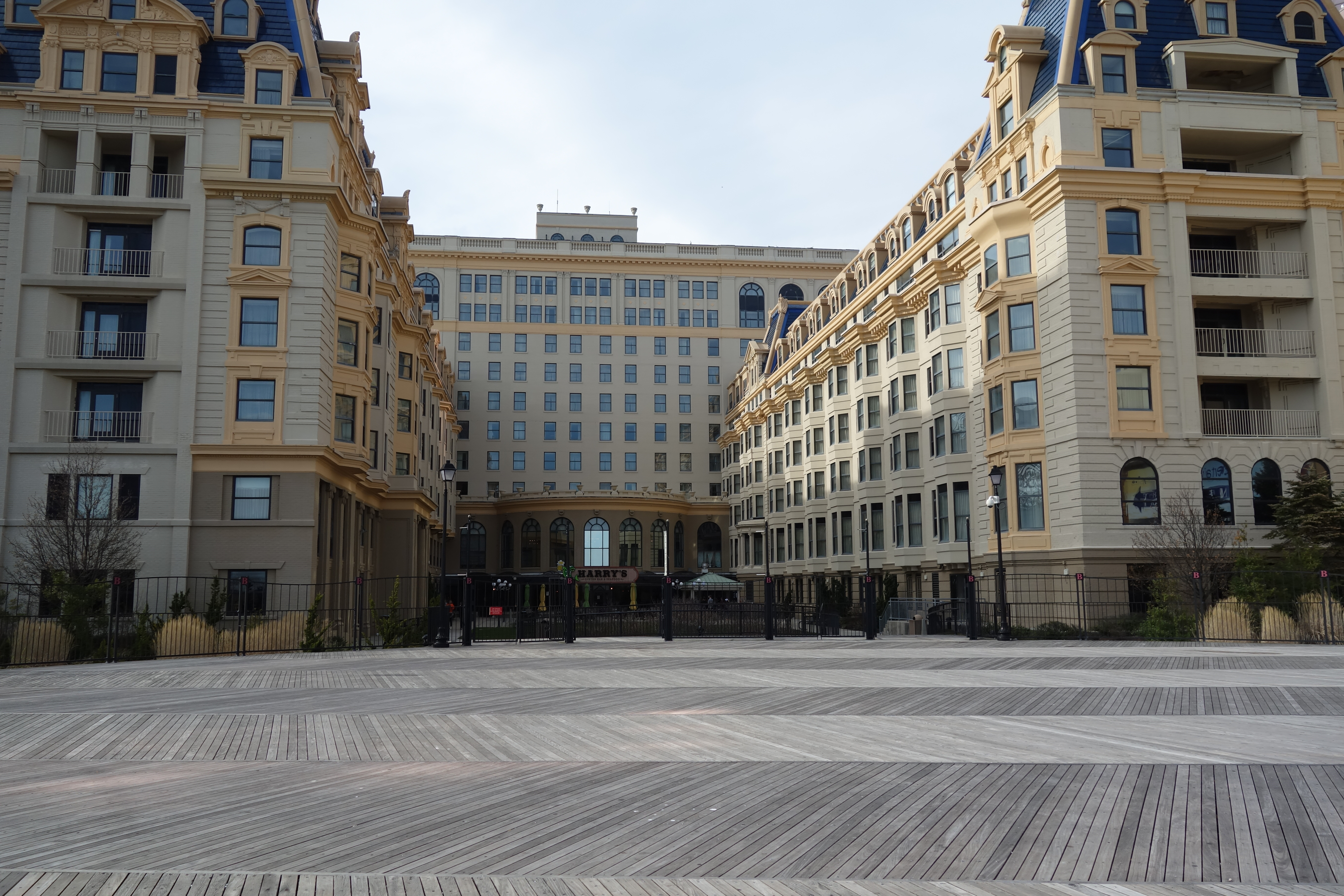
- The start and finish lines are on the boardwalk in front of the Dennis Courtyard of Bally's Atlantic City
- Date: October
- Location: Atlantic City, New Jersey, U.S.
- Event type: Road (about 8 mi (13 km) on a boardwalk)
- Distance: Marathon
- Established: 1960 (66 years ago) (Note: Although the race's web site claims that the marathon was established in 1958, a number of other sources, including a statement regarding a memory of the race founder's son printed in a USA Track & Field publication, state that the race was founded in 1959. In addition, both the Association of Road Racing Statisticians and the Asbury Park Press state that the inaugural race was held in 1960.)
- Website: https://www.acraceseries.com/event-information
- Participants: 623 finishers (2019)

The Atlantic City Marathon is the third oldest active marathon in the United States. It typically takes place on the third weekend in October.

== Course ==
External image
- Course map of full marathon in 2019

The marathon runs on a loop course that begins and ends in front of Bally's Atlantic City, with about 8 mi (13 km) of the race being run on the Atlantic City Boardwalk.

== Races ==
- Atlantic City Marathon
- Atlantic City Half Marathon
- Atlantic City 10K
- Atlantic City 5K
- Atlantic City Boardwalk Run 5 Miler
- Atlantic City April Fools Half Marathon and 8K
