= Warm Up Columbus Marathon =

Annual marathon in the United States

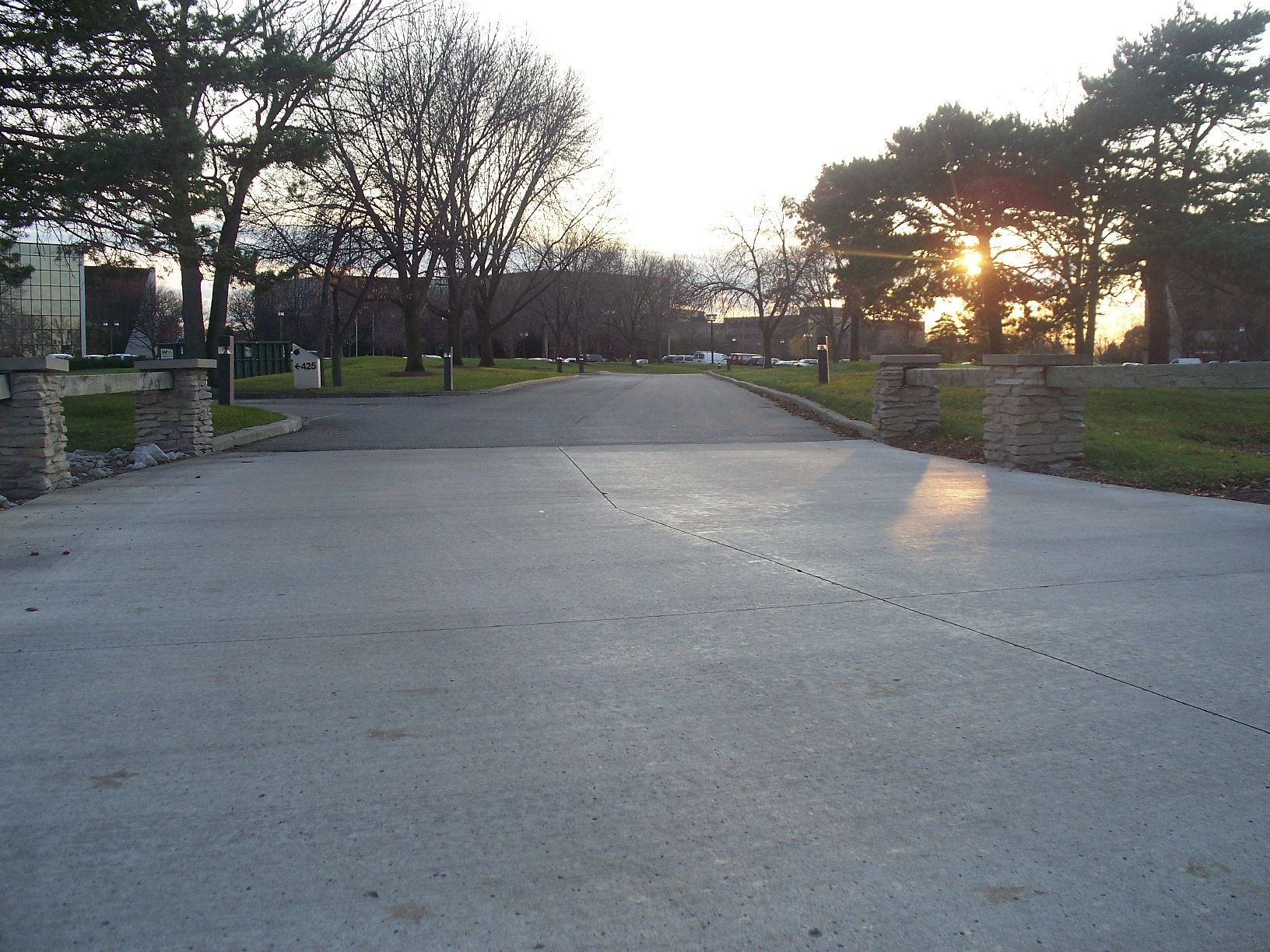
This is the steepest incline on the Warm Up Columbus Marathon course.

The Warm Up Columbus Marathon is a marathon, 42.195 kilometres (26.219 mi), held each February in Dublin, Ohio, a northwest suburb of Columbus, Ohio. Unique team relays, a 1/2 marathon, 5K race and 10K race are held in conjunction with the marathon.

== The course ==
The course is a 1-mile loop located in the Metro Place Business Park. It is a very flat, fast course, USATF Certified course OH03006PR. Race clocks are positioned so that runners can view their split times every ¼ mile allowing a very steady pace to be maintained. The 1-mile loop design allows runners access to the single fluid station 26 times during the race.

== History ==
Originally named the Last Chance for Boston Marathon, it was first held in 2001 and was offered literally as a last opportunity to qualify for the Boston Marathon. Race event personnel would hand carry the Boston Marathon applications of those runners who had qualified to the Post Office immediately after the race. Recently, changing application deadlines for the Boston Marathon have meant that the race is no longer the “last chance” to qualify but the race has retained its name. Qualifying times in this race may be used to enter the same year or the following year’s Boston Marathon.
