= Rock 'n' Roll Denver Marathon =

- Date: October
- Location: Denver, Colorado
- Event type: Road
- Distance: Marathon and half marathon
- Established: 2007
- Last held: 2019
- Website: denver.competitor.com

The Rock 'n' Roll Denver Marathon was an annual marathon and half-marathon held in Denver, Colorado. It was last organised by Dalian Wanda 大连万达 of China, who and its predecessor, Competitor Group, took over management in 2010 of a race that first began in 2006, when nearly 1,200 people participated in the main marathon event. Additionally, over 1,700 took part in the half marathon that year. Other events include a four leg relay marathon and a kids race.

The marathon supported a number of charities, including the Colorado Neurological Institute and the American Council of the Blind.

No race has occurred since 2019 and it is now considered an archived event by Competitor Group.

== Winners ==
=== Men ===
- 2006 Clint Wells, Superior, Colorado, 2:28:36
- 2007 Jonathan Ndambuki, Santa Fe, New Mexico, 2:21:34
- 2008 Jynocel Basweti, Santa Fe, New Mexico, 2:22:13
- 2009 Chris Siemers, Bensonville, Illinois, 2:23:03

=== Women ===
- 2006 Taeko Terauchi, Tokyo, Japan, 2:51:35
- 2007 Martha Tenorio, Boulder, Colorado, 2:46:41
- 2008 Nuta Olaru, Longmont, Colorado, 2:42:18
