= Madison Marathon =

Competitive jogging event

The Madison Marathon (Madison, Wisconsin) is an annual marathon foot-race run over a 42.195-kilometer (26.219 mi) course through the city of Madison.

Race day events also include a half marathon, a quarter marathon and a Kids Race.

== History ==
Nearly 5,000 people participated in the 2006 events.

Race organizers announced that for the 2007 event, the race would officially revert to its original name, the Madison Marathon from Mad City Marathon. The start and finish were held at the Alliant Energy Center to eliminate the need for buses as part of being a Runner's World Green Marathon.

In 2010, race organizers moved the Madison Marathon races start and finish lines to the Capitol Square. Over 8,300 runners took part in the Marathon, Half Marathon Run, Half Marathon Walk, and Quarter Marathon races.

== Winners ==
Race date	Male Winner	Time	Female Winner	Time	Non-Binary Winner	Time	Reference
2006	Joe Kurian	2:41:47	Kelley Hess	3:24:50			
2007	Ricky Reusser	2:29:30	Linsey Smith	2:58:30			
2008	Ricky Reusser	2:31:42	Aimee Kurian	3:09:08			
2009	Ricky Reusser	2:26:00	Jessica Hruska	3:07:49			
2010	Ricky Reusser	2:30:39	Erin Manlove	3:08:28			
2021	John Judge	2:24:12	Maya Rowen	2:52:15			
2022	Martin Erl	2:24:55	Jenny Zwagerman	2:51:11			
2023	Daniel Pederson	2:24:47	Maya Rowen	2:54:11			
2024	Patrick Campbell	2:20:00	Caitlin Kowalke	2:44:42	Krzysztof Bak	3:14:17	
