= Mississippi Blues Marathon =

The Mississippi Blues Marathon is an annual marathon and half-marathon foot-race run in Jackson, Mississippi, United States. The inaugural race was held January 5, 2008. The race replaced the former Mississippi Marathon, which had been held since 1976. In 2007, new organizers brought in BlueCross BlueShield of Mississippi as title sponsor and offered a total purse of $30,000. The race features live blues musicians playing around the course and at the finish line. In the Fall of 2017, Continental Tire was announced as the new Presenting Sponsor for the January 27, 2018 race.
