= Cape Cod Marathon =

Annual run in Falmouth, Massachusetts, US

The Cape Cod Marathon is run in Falmouth, Massachusetts, on Cape Cod during late October of each year.

== Background ==
From 1978 to 1983, the marathon was run at Otis Air Force Base and Camp Edwards in neighboring Bourne, Massachusetts. From 1984 the marathon has been held in Falmouth under the auspices of the Falmouth Track Club.

The course of the Cape Cod Marathon is a certified Boston Marathon qualifying event and is sanctioned by USA Track and Field (USATF) New England division.

Runner's World Magazine has named the Cape Cod Marathon one of the ten most scenic marathons in North America.

== Course ==
The course changed in 2019 to be a new faster, flatter, and much more scenic marathon route, which boasts about 23 miles of flatness with ocean views. It starts and finishes at the same location beside the Falmouth Village Green, which is situated at about an elevation of 20 feet above sea level. This results in a net elevation gain/loss of zero. The total elevation gain over the entire course is 390 feet.

From the start to about 19.4 miles, the course is mostly flat with only minor elevation changes of about 30 feet at mile 3.4.

At 19.4 miles, the highest elevation on the course is about 50 feet. From there to mile 22, there is a mix of flat areas and hills that are part of the Falmouth Road Race course in the reverse direction, passing the Nobska Lighthouse along the way.

At mile 22, there is a flat stretch back to the finish line at the Falmouth Village Green.

The men's course record is held by Randy Thomas of Medway, Massachusetts: two hours, 17 minutes, 35 seconds (2:17:35) in 1986. Thomas was a multiple world and American record holder in distance running events.

The women's course record is held by Cathy Schiro, now Cathy Schiro-O'Brien, of Dover, New Hampshire: two hours, 37 minutes, six seconds (2:37:06) in 1987. Schiro-O'Brien was a marathon runner in the 1992 Summer Olympics.

== Sponsorship ==
The Cape Cod Marathon benefits from many sponsors, most of which are local businesses from Cape Cod, Martha's Vineyard, Nantucket, and the greater area. Dunkin' Donuts, based in Canton, Massachusetts, has been the titular sponsor in recent runnings. The 2025 and 2026 races were sponsored by Shipwrecked, a restaurant in Falmouth Heights.

== Cancellation ==
In 2020, the race was canceled due to the COVID-19 pandemic. In 2021, it was canceled due to the effects of a nor'easter.
