= Sioux Falls Marathon =

Annual race in the United States held since 2012

- Date: Fall
- Location: Sioux Falls, South Dakota, U.S.
- Event type: Road
- Distance: Marathon
- Primary sponsor: Sanford Health
- Established: 2012 (14 years ago)
- Course records: Men: 2:26:12; Women: 2:48:34
- Website: https://www.siouxfallsmarathon.com/
- Participants: 402 finishers (2025)

The Sioux Falls Marathon is an annual 42.195-kilometre (26.219 mi) race held in Sioux Falls, South Dakota, USA. The race was established in 2012 and is a USATF certified full marathon that is a Boston Qualifying Race. The Sioux Falls marathon weekend events also include a half marathon and 5k.

== History ==
The Sioux Falls Marathon was started in 2012 by the Sioux Falls Sports Authority. A portion of the proceeds goes to the Sanford Children's Hospital and Children's Miracle Network.

The marathon was canceled in 2020 and 2021 due to the COVID-19 pandemic. The race was canceled in 2024 due to high temperatures and humidity. Participants could defer their registration to the 2025 race.

== Course ==
The course runs through downtown Sioux Falls and Falls Park, utilizing the city's extensive bike trail system. The race begins at the Sioux Falls Arena and finishes at Howard Wood Field.

The course time limit is 6 hours and 30 minutes.

== Winners ==
Course record (in bold)

Date	Time	Men's winner	Time	Women's winner
2025	2:40:40	Kade Bullion (USA)	**2:48:34**	**Jen Van Otterloo** (USA)
—		Sioux Falls Marathon was not held in 2024 due to excessive heat		
2023	2:37:30	Matthew Horan (USA)	2:56:38	Jen Van Otterloo (USA)
2022	2:38:00	Matthew Horan (USA)	2:52:49	Jen Van Otterloo (USA)
—	—	Sioux Falls Marathon not held in 2020 & 2021 due to COVID-19 pandemic		
2019	2:32:27	Arturs Bareikis (LAT)	2:51:27	Jen Van Otterloo (USA)
2018	2:31:37	Arturs Bareikis (LAT)	2:53:06	Jen Van Otterloo (USA)
2017	2:29:49	Bryan Morseman (USA)	3:10:33	Jennifer Vande Vegte (USA)
2016	2:38:24	Geoffrey Kiprotich (KEN)	3:06:39	Jennifer Vande Vegte (USA)
2015	2:38:33	Thomas Garang Madut (USA)	3:22:30	Hellois Scheeres (USA)
2014	**2:26:12**	**Matthew Fideler** (USA)	2:55:08	Danielle Vsetecka (USA)
2013	2:29:06	Wojciech Kopec (POL)	3:16:19	Michelle Haan (USA)
2012	2:30:10	Justin Gillette (USA)	2:50:41	Kelly Brinkman (USA)
