= Infront Sports & Media =

Swiss sports marketing company

- Type: Sports & Media
- Founded: October 2002; 24 years ago
- Headquarters: Zug, Switzerland
- Number of locations: 40
- Key people: Philippe Blatter (President and CEO)
- Number of employees: 1000+
- Parent: Dalian Wanda Group (among others)
- Website: infront.sport

Infront Sports & Media is a sports marketing and media company based in Zug, Switzerland with over 40 offices globally. The company handles the media and marketing rights for over 200 international sports events and federations and also provides sports services - such as advertising, betting rights, sponsorship, production and hospitality. It represents six out of seven Olympic winter sport federations, several summer sport organizations and manages media rights for the FIS World Cup and World Championship Events. It also represents the International Olympic Committee (IOC) for Archive Image Rights and several top football leagues. In addition it is the majority owner of several mass participation sports including Hyrox. Infront was created in late 2002 through the integration of CWL, Prisma and KirchSportAG.

== History ==
Infront Sports & Media was founded in October 2002 with FIFA as its core business as the company who sold the television and radio broadcasts for the 2002 FIFA World Cup. The company originated from a merger of two existing Swiss-based marketing companies, CWL and Prisma Sports & Media. CWL was founded by Cesar Lüthi, who sold the business to the Kirch Group. On 17 February 2003, the transaction for the management-supported buyout by a group of shareholders led by Robert Louis-Dreyfus, former head of Adidas and majority shareholder of Olympique de Marseille, was announced as complete and the new ownership group now in place.

In 2005 the company lost the right to resell the TV and radio rights in Europe, though it retained the ability to sell Asian rights, as part of a division of the rights by FIFA. Infront subsidy HBS won the contract to manage the TV and radio broadcast production. Two months later, the company hired President and CEO Phillippe Blatter, to replace departing chief Oscar Frei. The appointment of Blatter, who is the nephew of Sepp Blatter, the then President of FIFA, was criticized by author Andrew Jennings and Transparency International. During this time as chief executive, Phillippe Blatter was able to grow the company's revenues.

2005 also saw the start of Infront’s partnership with the International Ski and Snowboard Federation, acquiring the FIS World Cup and World Championships rights through the majority shareholding of APF Marketing Services. It further diversified in 2006 through the acquisition of Media Partners whilst also launching Football Media Services alongside Dentsu to sell the FIFA Asian media rights.

In 2007 it acquired DSM Sportwerbung, rebranding it to Infront Germany before expanding to Austria after acquiring APF Marketing Services GmbH.

Until 2011 it was owned by a consortium of shareholders. In September 2011 – European private equity firm Bridgepoint reached an agreement to acquire the company. In February 2015, Chinese conglomerate Dalian Wanda won an auction to purchase Infront from Bridgepoint for more than €1 billion. In November of that same year, it was announced that Infront would merge with the World Triathlon Corporation (including the latter's Ironman brand) to form the Wanda Sports division.

== Services ==
Infront Sports & Media has 1000 employees in 16 countries. Infront Sports & Media supports media and betting rights distribution, marketing concepts and sponsorship sales for sporting events as well as media production (host broadcasting, post production and archive management). Infront's subsidiary, Host Broadcast Services (HBS), manages television and radio signals for broadcasters at sports events such as the FIFA World Cup.

== Notable work ==
=== Association football ===
Infront has supported the FIFA World Cup since 2002. It provides advisory support for South and Southeastern Asian media rights and manages the host broadcast production. Infront also works with the German Football Association (DFB), Italy's Lega Serie A, the Premier League, Ligue 1, Bundesliga, Scottish Professional Football League and La Liga through its fully-owned subsidiary HBS.

Infront's HBS subsidiary was awarded the Judge's award at the 2010 International Broadcasting Convention for its work helping FIFA broadcast the World Cup in stereoscopic 3D.

In 2011, Transparency International asked FIFA to be more open about possible conflicts of interest, when it was discovered that the president of Infront was Philippe Blatter, nephew to the president of FIFA, Sepp Blatter. FIFA said Blatter was not involved in awarding the deal to Infront.

=== Olympic Games ===
The International Olympic Committee (IOC) awarded the broadcast rights in Sub-Saharan Africa to Infront for the 2014 Olympic Winter Games in Sochi, Russia, the 2016 Olympic Games in Rio de Janeiro, Brazil and the 2nd Summer Youth Olympic Games in 2014 in Nanjing, China. In 2019 this was extended to include the Olympic Games Tokyo 2020, the Olympic Winter Games Beijing 2022 and the Olympic Games Paris 2024, as well as the Youth Olympic Games Lausanne 2020 and Dakar 2022.

In 2023 the IOC announced that Infront was awarded the exclusive broadcast rights in 22 countries in Central and South-East Asia for the 2026 Olympic Winter Games in Milano Cortina, the 2028 Olympic Games in Los Angeles, the 2030 Olympic Winter Games and the 2032 Olympic Games in Brisbane, Australia.

The IOC also reached an agreement with Infront to manage the commercialisation of the IOC’s images archive in 2025.

=== Winter sports ===
Infront has media and/or sponsorship partnerships with six of the seven international federations of Winter Olympic sports: the International Ice Hockey Federation (since 1981), the International Ski Federation (since 1990), the International Biathlon Union (since 1992), the International Bobsleigh and Skeleton Federation (since 1999), the International Luge Federation (since 1999), the International Skating Union (since 2015), and the World Curling Federation (since 2018). It also manages media and/or sponsorship rights to all events of the different FIS World Cup events as well as the FIS World Championships from 2026-2029.

=== Athletics ===
In July 2018, Infront and FIDAL, the Italian Athletics Federation, announced a six-year partnership.

Infront extended its footprint in athletics in 2020, signing a host broadcasting partnership with World Athletics for the World Athletics Continental Tour which was extended in 2023 to include the World Athletics Indoor Tour Gold series.

Infront also holds the global rights to the Diamond League until 2030.

=== Other sports ===
Infront is a media and sponsorship partner for the European Handball Federation (since 1993) and the European Volleyball Confederation (since 1993).

In 2011, Infront became a partner of the World Triathlon Corporation, promoter of the Ironman Triathlon races. In 2018 it also became a partner for World Triathlon.

Infront signed a media rights partnership with Union Cycliste Internationale in 2012. It also has partnerships with several UCI World Tour races such as the Tour de Suisse, Tour de Romandie, Tour of Poland, Cadel Evans Great Ocean Road Race, E3 Saxo Bank Classic, Amstel Gold Race and the Flanders Classics.

In 2016, Infront became the media and sponsorship partner of the International Basketball Federation (FIBA) and the Badminton World Federation. In 2019, it purchased Youthstream, promoter of the Motocross World Championship, Motocross of Nations and Snowcross World Championship. In 2020 it was appointed to exclusively manage Lega Basket Serie A’s marketing, sponsorship and digital rights. In 2021, Infront became a media and sponsorship partner of the Professional Squash Association.

In China, Infront represents the Chinese Basketball Association and the Chinese national basketball team.

=== Mass participation sport ===
In December 2013 Infront acquired B2Run, one of Europe’s largest corporate running series, beginning its mass participation business. This was followed by the forming of a dedicated Active Lifestyle unit in February 2015.

On 4 June 2018, Infront announced the acquisition of leading European obstacle course event organiser XLETIX GmbH in a move that extends its footprint in the growing personal and corporate fitness sector. This was followed by the acquisition of Threshold Sports in April 2019, adding ultra running and long-distance cycling events to its portfolio, before adding Megamarsch a month later.

Infront made its first strategic investment in Hyrox, the world series of fitness in December 2019, becoming the majority stakeholder in October 2022.

It is also a stakeholder in the Abbott World Marathon Majors Sydney Marathon as well as candidate races the Cape Town Marathon and Shanghai Marathon.

== Notable employees ==
- Gunter Netzer, former German football player, founded the company.
- Harald Griebel, developed marketing for the Ice Hockey World Championships from 1981 to 2008.
