= Rock 'n' Roll Las Vegas Marathon =

Annual race in the United States held since 1967

- Date: late February
- Location: Las Vegas, Nevada
- Event type: Road
- Distance: half marathon
- Established: 1967 (59 years ago)
- Course records: Men's: 2:11:58 (2005) (Kenya) Stephen Kiogora; Women's: 2:29:01 (2007) (Russia) Sylvia Skvortsova
- Website: Rock 'n Roll Running Series - Las Vegas
- Participants: 2,139 (2018)

The Rock 'n' Roll Las Vegas Running Series is an annual half marathon foot-race run on the Las Vegas Strip and in parts of the Las Vegas Valley, Nevada. The former marathon distance race was one of the oldest marathons in the United States, having been held annually between 1967 - 2019.

== History ==
The initial concept was to attract nationally and internationally recognized runners; this was partially successful. Morris Aarbo of Canada won the first year with a time of 2:23:06, ahead of two marathoners from Turkey. A notable participant in the inaugural race was Harry Reid, who at the time was involved with local Nevada government. The subsequent 17 annual races fielded mostly local runners with a sprinkling of national- and international-caliber runners. When the Las Vegas Sun newspaper scuttled its sponsorship of the marathon in 1969, the recently formed Las Vegas Track Club took over the event. Over the ensuing years, enrollment in the race remained low—in the range of 100 to 200 entrants—until the running boom of 1978 when the numbers bumped up for a year or two. Subsequently, entrants again diminished, with fewer than 102 finishers in 1982.

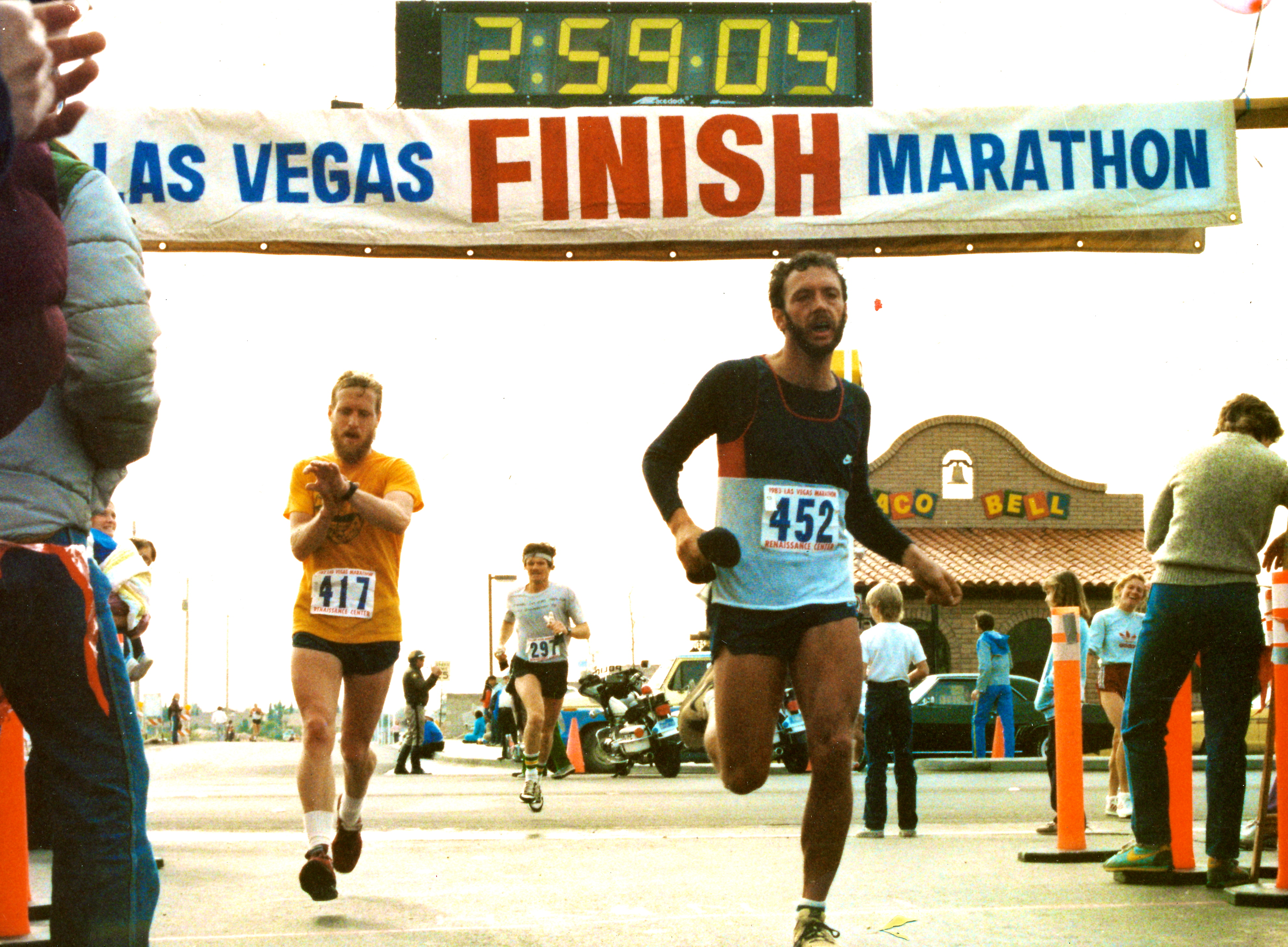
Finish line at the Renaissance Center in suburban Las Vegas (1983)

In 1983 Al Boka assumed directorship and inaugurated what he expected to be a very fast course. The new course bumped registration up to over 450 participants. However this downhill course proved to be too severe on the runners’ quadriceps, so after three years this route was discontinued. The course was changed to have a smaller vertical drop in 1986. Also beginning in 1986, prize money was offered to 19 age division winners. Later a half marathon was also added to the mix. Boka's strategy to attract more runners was successful; by 1992 enrollment exceeded 2000.

Boka remained race director of the Las Vegas Marathon for 23 years until he sold the event in 2005 to Devine Racing, a Chicago-based race organization company, which was also responsible for several other races, including the Los Angeles Marathon. That year the marathon date was changed from January to December after securing Las Vegas Events endorsement along with approval of the Las Vegas Convention and Visitors Authority. Both organizations were motivated by attracting visitors during the "slower" December time period and their consent was necessary for holding any large downtown event. The course was also changed to take place partially in the city.

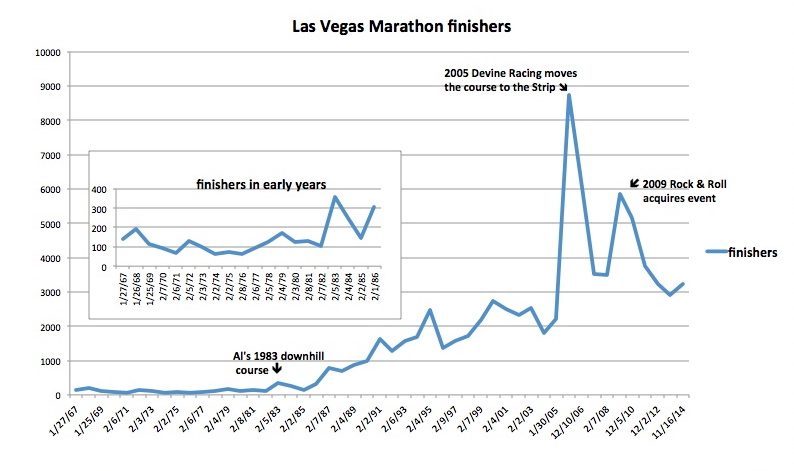
Number of marathon finishers each year from 1967 to 2014.

=== The Rock 'n' Roll Era ===
In 2009 the race was acquired by the Competitor Group, Inc. and incorporated into its Rock 'n' Roll Marathon Series and the course was changed for a fourth time since 1982.

Since the Competitor Group acquired the race in 2009, the number of full distance (26.219 mi (42.195 km)) marathoners has diminished, while the overall participation has increased dramatically . The venue itself, held at night on the Strip, has become more of a pop culture phenomenon than an international marathon. Most runners elect to do the half marathon while a few run ‘half of the half ‘ or 6.555 mi (10.549 km).

Runners in the 2011 event reported illness, overcrowding, and at least one person was hospitalized.

In 2014 the overall entrants exceeded 38,000 participants with only 3,208 runners completing the full 26.2 miles. 25,251 runners finished the half-marathon, 2,194 runners completed the 6.555-mile course while the balance ran a 5 kilometer (3.1 mile) race the day before the main event. Many of the short-distance runners were costumed. The Monte Carlo Casino promoted a ‘run-thru wedding’ during the race. While a high volume of entrants is necessary to carry the cost of closing the Las Vegas Strip for more than 12 hours, the paucity of actual marathoners distinguish the Las Vegas event from other big city venues such as Boston, New York, Chicago, London, or Berlin where the number of marathon finishers range from about 20,000 to more than 30,000. While successful as a commercial, for profit venture, this race falls short of the original vision to make the Las Vegas Marathon a world class, competitive running event.

In 2017, the race was acquired by and is now organized by the IRONMAN Group, part of Wanda Sports Holdings.

Organizers decided not to hold the 2020 edition of the race on its original date in November due to the coronavirus pandemic. Entrants were given either refunds or automatic entry deferral to 2021.

== Course ==
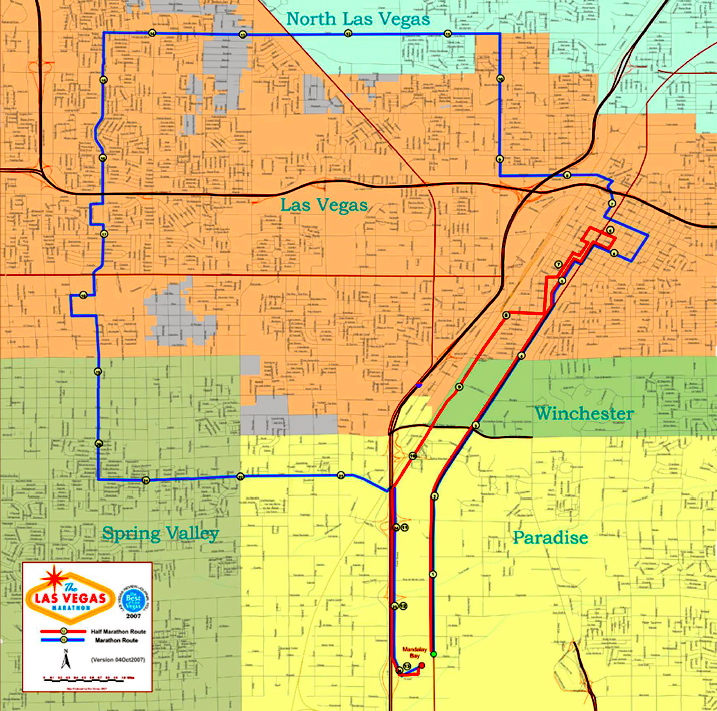
Las Vegas Marathon & Half Marathon loop courses - 2005 to 2008

From 1967 to 2004 the marathon course was located on several different routes within Clark County, but outside of downtown Las Vegas.

In 1983, Al Boka inaugurated a course that started on State Route 160, high in the Spring Mountains west of Las Vegas on the road to Pahrump, and descended approximately 2,900 feet (883.9m) into the valley, finishing at the Renaissance Center located at the corner of East Tropicana and Eastern Avenues.

The 1986 marathon course was changed to a smaller, 700-foot (213.36m) vertical drop. The new route headed north on State Route 604 from Jean NV, paralleling Interstate 15 much of the way, to its finish point at Sunset Park.

In 2005, the race course was moved from suburban Clark County to the Las Vegas "Strip" and partially in the city of Las Vegas. The loop course between 2005 and 2008 began and finished at Mandalay Bay Resort and Casino. After heading north on Las Vegas Boulevard (The Strip), to the Fremont Street Experience and the Downtown area, the course meandered further northwest of the city and ultimately looped back to the west before reaching Mandalay Bay's parking lot at the finish. The Half Marathon Course remained along the Strip.

In its most recent iteration, the full marathon began on Las Vegas Boulevard heading north through the Downtown casino area, proceeded further to the northwest, turns around and finished again on the strip near the Mirage and Venetian Casinos.

The event was not held in 2020 or 2021 because of the COVID-19 pandemic. It was announced in February, 2021 that Competitor group would be next hold their Las Vegas events on February 26 and 27, 2022. The decision was made to move the event due to the increasing difficulty of scheduling closures of the Las Vegas Boulevard that didn't conflict with sporting events involving the Vegas Golden Knights at T-Mobile Arena or the Las Vegas Raiders at Allegiant Stadium.

Beginning in 2022, the Rock 'n Roll Las Vegas event stopped offering the full marathon distance, due to poor feedback on the event from prior participants. The race weekend now consists of the half-marathon distance, 10 km and 5 km races.

In 2024, the race had a new start line, beginning at Toshiba Plaza.

== Half marathon winners ==
Year	Men's Winner	Time	Women's Winner	Time
2024	Andy Wacker (USA)	1:04:47	Alice Wright (UK)	1:14:10
2023	Benjamin Stone (USA)	1:12:32	Diana Bogantes Gonzales (Costa Rica)	1:13:08
2022	Justin Kent (CAN)	1:04:38	Ellie Stevens (UK)	1:17:53

== Marathon winners (1993-2019) ==
Key: Course record (in bold)

Year	Men's winner	Time	Women's winner	Time	Rf.
2019	Thomas Puzey (USA)	2:28:04	Heather Bray (USA)	3:13:00	
2018	Thomas Puzey (USA)	2:25:53	Hannah McInturff (USA)	3:07:24	
2017	Gilles Rubio (FRA)	2:38:04	Marisa Hird (USA)	2:55:19	
2016	Michael Wardian (USA)	2:38:04	Chelsey Leighton (USA)	3:12:11	
2015	Andrew Lemoncello (GBR)	2:21:47	Williana Rojas (PAN)	3:08:18	
2014	Ben Bruce (USA)	2:27:22	Cathy Cullen (CAN)	2:56:57	
2013	Jason Brosseau (USA)	2:35:26	Nuța Olaru (USA)	2:58:46	
2012	Jonathan Ndambuki (USA)	2:32:24	Nuța Olaru (ROM)	2:51:31	
2011	Peter Omae (KEN)	2:29:12	Zsófia Erdélyi (HUN)	2:48:58	
2010	Josh Cox (USA)	2:25:05	Dorota Gruca (POL)	2:44:36	
2009	Christopher Toroitich (KEN)	2:15:15	Caroline Rotich (KEN)	2:29:47	
2008	Abebe Yimer (ETH)	2:27:27	Nadezhda Tuptova (RUS)	2:48:20	
2007	Christopher Cheboiboch (KEN)	2:16:49	Sylvia Skvortsova (RUS)	**2:29:01**	
2006	Joseph Kahugo (KEN)	2:16:23	Jemima Jelagat (KEN)	2:35:12	
2005 (Dec)	Stephen Kiogora (KEN)	**2:11:58**	Adriana Fernández (MEX)	2:31:54	
2005 (Jan)	Gilbert Koech (KEN)	2:13:45	Olga Kovpotina (RUS)	2:31:54	
2004	Kevin Herd (USA)	2:28:13	Kari Anne Bertrand (USA)	2:45:46	
2003	David Bronfenbrenner (USA)	2:33:34	Linda Huyck (USA)	2:57:48	
2002	Abebe Yimer (ETH)	2:18:48	Midori Sperandeo (USA)	2:41:52	
2001	Mike Dudley (USA)	2:18:13	Irina Kazakova (FRA)	2:41:56	
2000	Rob Reeder (USA)	2:17:15	Joanna Gront (POL)	2:36:00	
1999	Zoltán Holba (HUN)	2:16:42	Alena Vinnitskaya (BLR)	2:32:43	
1998	Zoltán Holba (HUN)	2:14:15	Joanna Gront (POL)	2:43:32	
1997	Zoltán Holba (HUN)	2:14:23	Marzena Helbik (POL)	2:32:22	
1996	Zoltán Holba (HUN)	2:16:10	Yelena Makolova (BLR)	2:40:17	
1995	Vladimir Netreba (RUS)	2:14:52	Laura Mason (USA)	2:37:20	
1994	Michael Dudley (USA)	2:16:54	Roxi Erickson (USA)	2:40:14	
1993	Doug Kurtis (USA)	2:18:55	Kathleen Smith (USA)	2:41:55	

- 1967 — Morris Aarbo: 2:23:06 Las Vegas Sun Marathon (first course)
