= Rock 'n' Roll Washington DC Marathon =

Annual race in the United States held since 2006

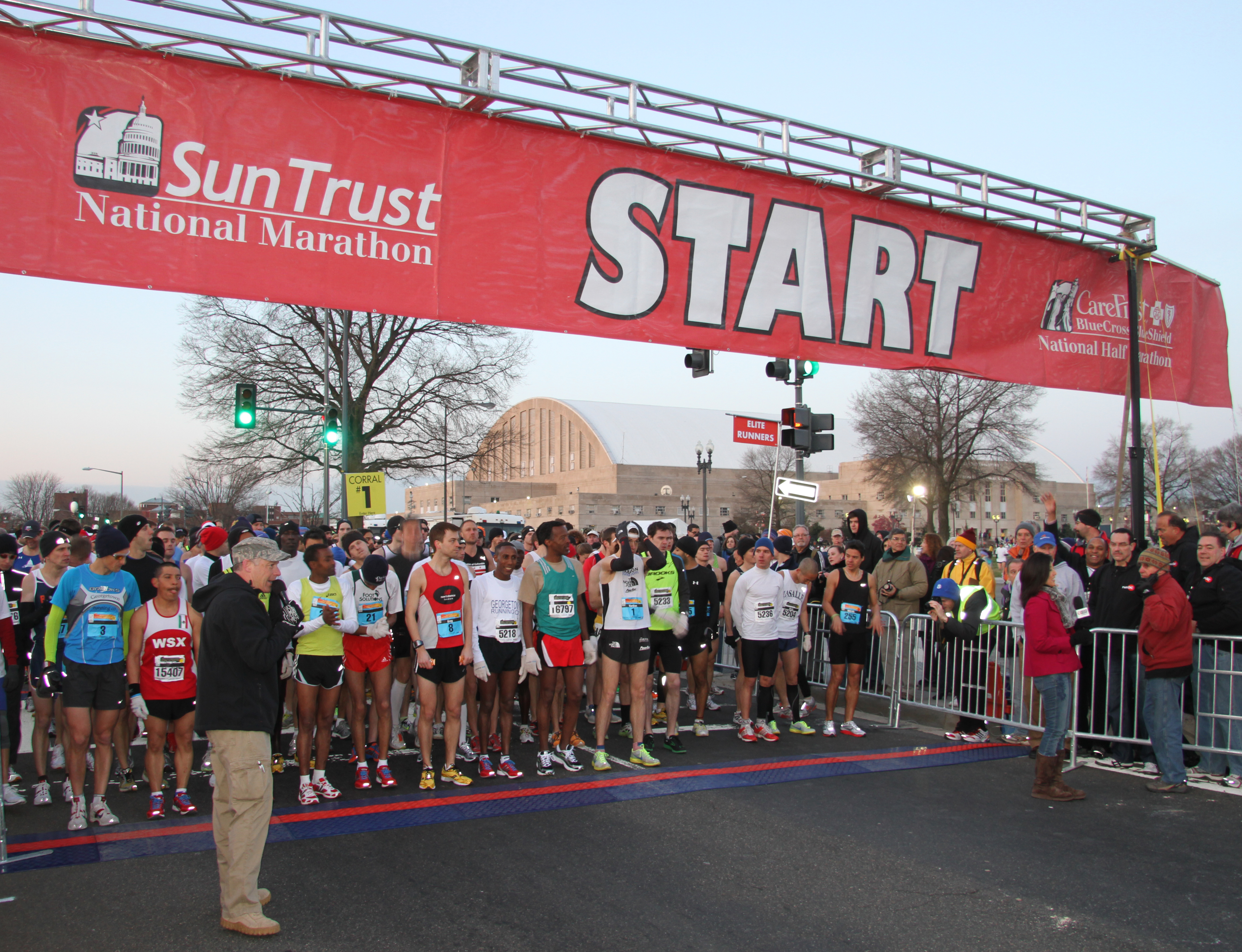
- Start line in front of the D.C. Armory in 2011
- Date: March
- Location: Washington, D.C.
- Event type: Road
- Distance: half marathon & 5K
- Primary sponsor: United Airlines
- Established: 2006 (20 years ago)
- Course records: Men's: 2:20:45 (2018) (United States) Tyler Andrews; Women's: 2:43:00 (2014) (United States) Nuța Olaru
- Website: Rock 'n' Roll Running Series - Washington DC

The St Jude Rock 'n' Roll Running Series - Washington DC, formerly known as the National Marathon, is an annual half marathon and 5k held in Washington, D.C. since 2006. The half marathon, 5k, and formerly offered marathon distance races take place entirely within Washington, D.C. While the marathon finished near RFK Stadium, the half marathon and 5k finish at 4th St. NW & Pennsylvania Ave. NW at the bottom of Capitol Hill.

The race is organized by Competitor Group, Inc.

== History ==
The marathon was started by the Greater Washington Sports Alliance in 2006.

In 2007, the National Marathon was sponsored by Wirefly, an online cell phone retailer.

In 2008, SunTrust Banks became the race's primary sponsor. The number of participants was limited to 8,000 in 2008.

The race was sold to Competitor Group, Inc. in 2011 to become part of their Rock 'n' Roll Marathon Series.

The 2020 edition of the race was cancelled due to the coronavirus pandemic. (Note: On 2020.03.11, Mayor Muriel Bowser pulled the permit for the 2020 edition of the race due to the coronavirus pandemic, and the race organizers announced the race's postponement the following day. The organizers later announced that the event would be rescheduled for 2020.11.07, but that the marathon distance would not be offered. Eventually, the race was cancelled altogether.)

Organizers announced that the race would return on March 27, 2021 as a "Half Marathon event".

== Course ==
External images
- Course map of full marathon in 2011
- Course map of full marathon in 2019

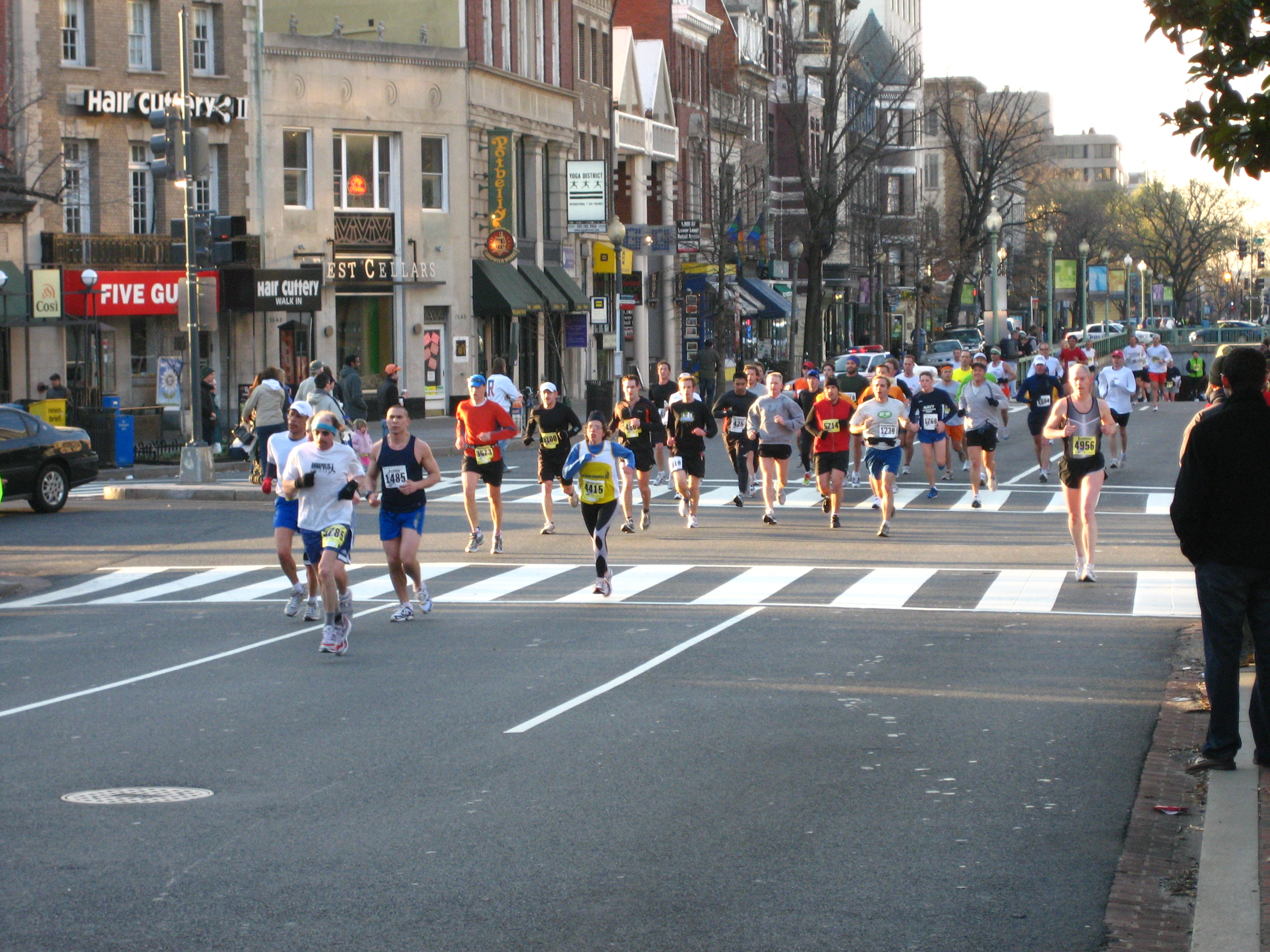
Traversing Connecticut Ave., 2008

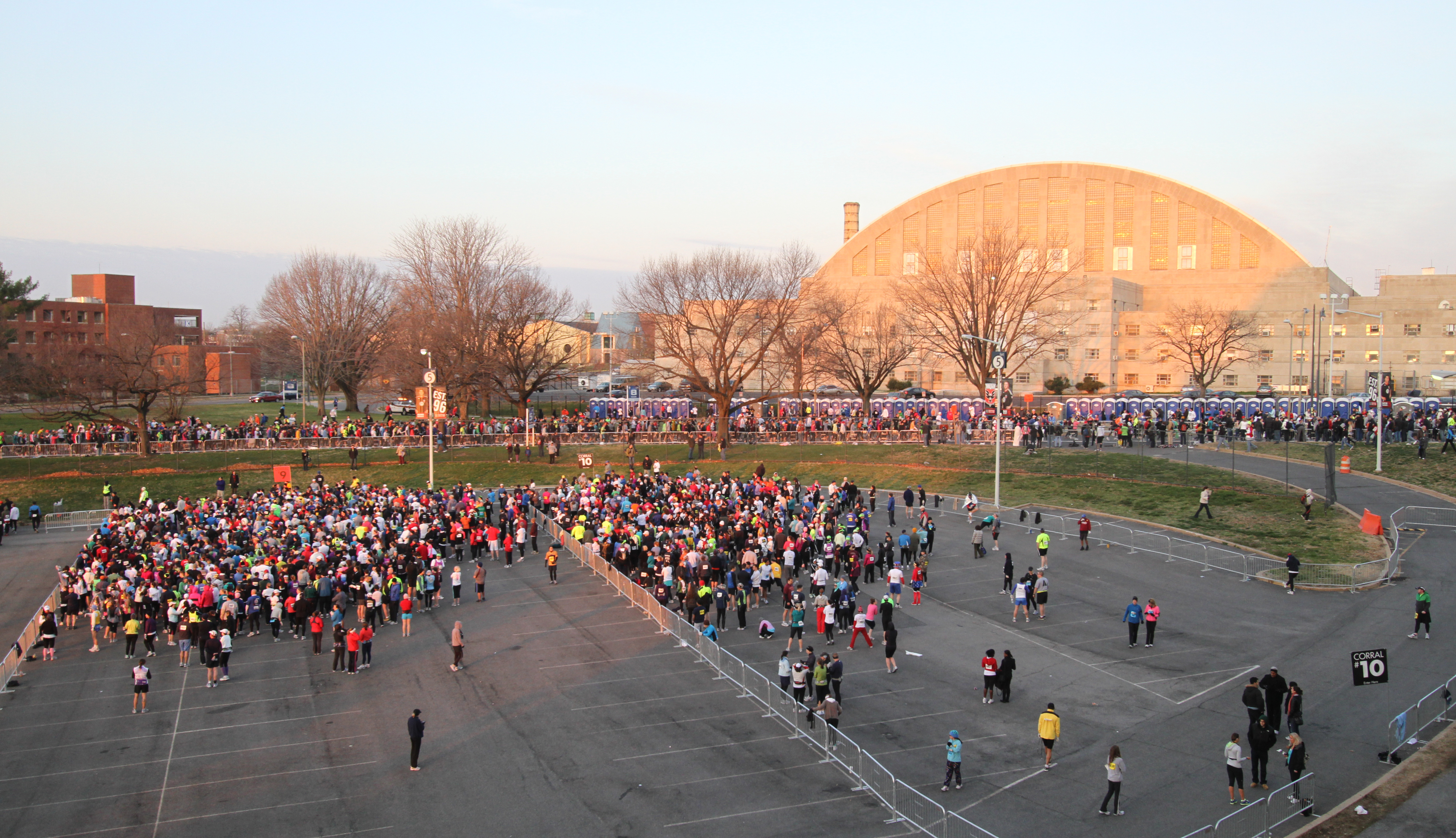
Start corrals at the Armory, 2011

Both the marathon course and the half marathon course start on Constitution Avenue near the National Mall and finish near RFK Stadium. In addition, both courses are entirely contained within Washington, D.C.

The course for the inaugural race in 2006 was largely in Washington, D.C., with about 7 miles (11 km) located in Prince George's County, Maryland.

In 2007, the course was altered so that it was located entirely within the District of Columbia. The race in 2008 and thereafter passes through 6 of the District's 8 wards.

In 2012, the start was moved westward from a location near the RFK Stadium and the finish to a location near the National Mall on Constitution Avenue, beginning with the 2013 race.

== Community impact ==
Among the beneficiaries of the marathon are Boys & Girls Clubs of Greater Washington, Special Olympics District of Columbia, United For D.C., Fort Dupont Ice Arena, Washington Tennis & Education Foundation and Black History Invitational Swim Meet.

== Winners ==
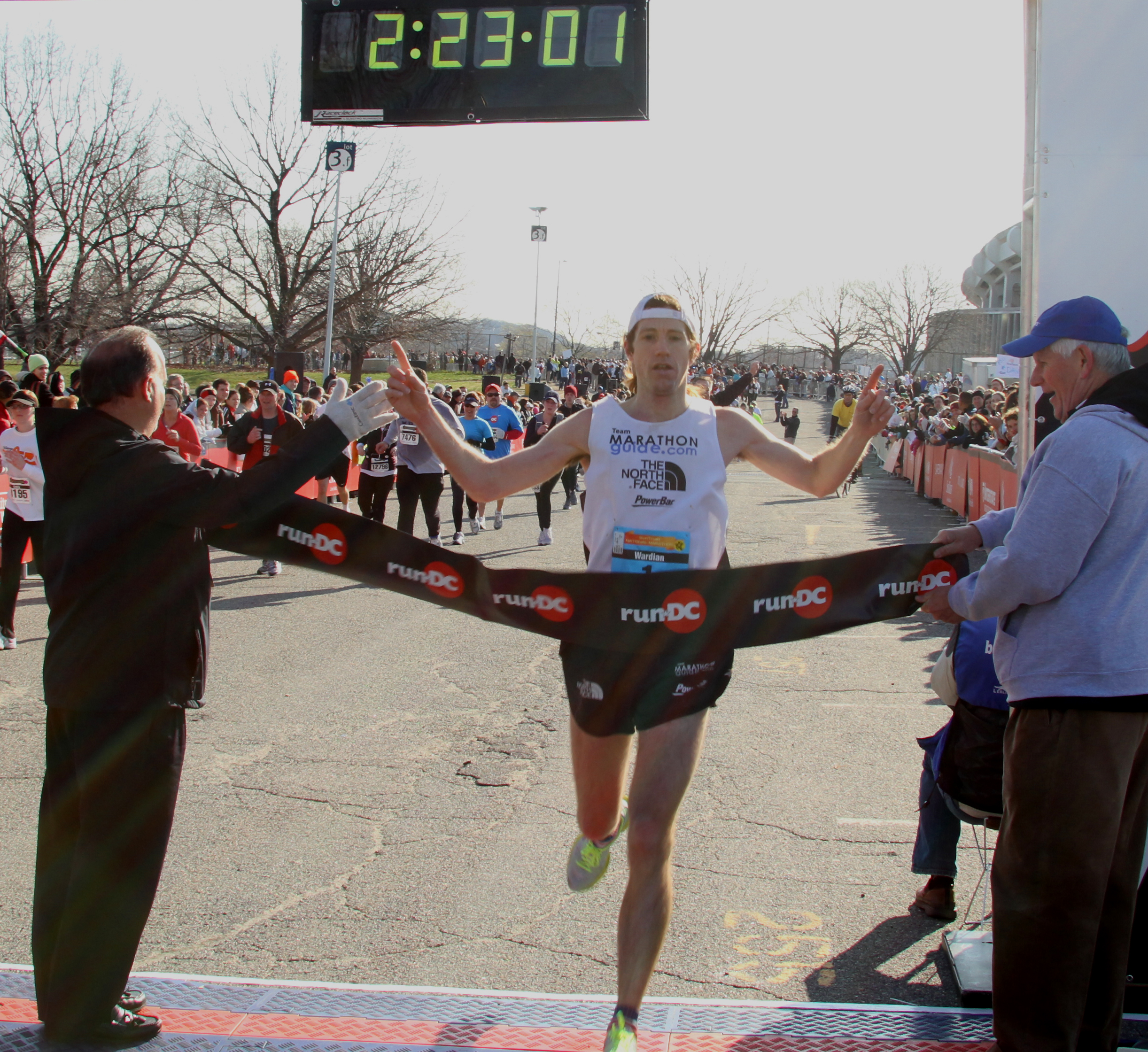
Michael Wardian winning in 2011

| Ed. | Year | Men's winner | Time | Women's winner | Time | Rf. |
|---|---|---|---|---|---|---|
| 1 | 2006 | Michael Wardian (USA) (Note: Representing Virginia) | 2:30:55 | Susan Graham-Gray (USA) (Note: Representing Pennsylvania) | 2:58:05 | |
| 2 | 2007 | Michael Wardian (USA) | 2:26:35 | Katie Blackett (USA) (Note: Representing Colorado) | 2:44:57 | |
| 3 | 2008 | Michael Wardian (USA) | 2:25:00 | Myriam Grenon (CAN) (Note: Representing Quebec) | 2:54:02 | |
| 4 | 2009 | Patrick Moulton (USA) (Note: Representing Rhode Island) | 2:21:12 | Jeannette Seckinger (USA) (Note: Representing Massachusetts) | 2:48:41 | |
| 5 | 2010 | Michael Wardian (USA) | 2:21:59 | Krista Vrombaut (USA) (Note: Representing Illinois) | 2:51:16 | |
| 6 | 2011 | Michael Wardian (USA) | 2:23:01 | Nadezhda Tuptova (RUS) | 2:50:53 | |
| 7 | 2012 | Michael Wardian (USA) | 2:26:35 | Meghan Bishop (USA) | 3:01:32 | |
| 8 | 2013 | Peter Lawrence (USA) (Note: Representing Texas) | 2:32:27 | Ashley Olsen (USA) | 2:53:28 | |
| 9 | 2014 | Adam Doherty (USA) | 2:33:52 | Nuța Olaru (USA) | 2:43:00 | |
| 10 | 2015 | Patrick Moulton (USA) | 2:32:54 | Martha Nelson (USA) (Note: Representing Washington, D.C.) | 2:55:31 | |
| 11 | 2016 | Alfredo Arévalo (GTM) | 2:30:04 | Martha Nelson (USA) | 2:58:02 | |
| 12 | 2017 | Samuel Doud (USA) | 2:26:57 | Christie Wetzel (USA) | 3:04:01 | |
| 13 | 2018 | Tyler Andrews (USA) | 2:20:45 | Rochelle Sceats-Basil (USA) | 2:54:58 | |
| 14 | 2019 | Tyler Andrews (USA) | 2:24:13 | Katie Walter (USA) (Note: Representing North Carolina) | 2:59:54 | |
| | 2020 | cancelled due to coronavirus pandemic | | | | |
| | 2021 | marathon cancelled, only half marathon & 5k held | | | | |
| | 2022 | marathon cancelled, only half marathon & 5k held | | | | |
