= Wanda Group =

Chinese conglomerate

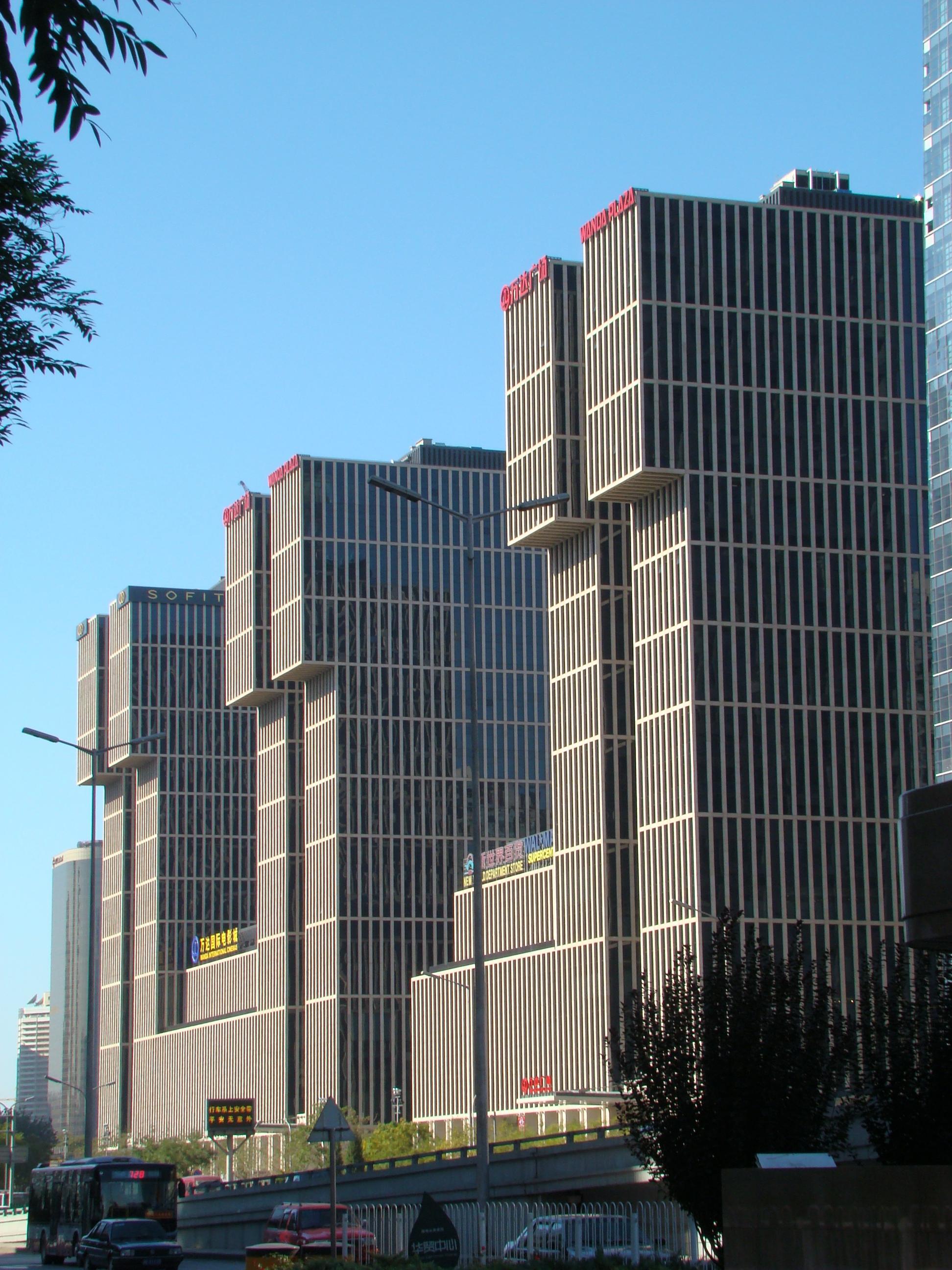
- Wanda Plaza in Beijing houses the company's headquarters.
- Native name: 万达集团 / 大连万达
- Romanized name: Wàndá Jítuán / Dàlián Wàndá
- Type: Private
- Industry: Conglomerate
- Founded: 1988; 38 years ago, in Dalian, Liaoning, China
- Headquarters: Beijing, China
- Area served: Worldwide
- Key people: Wang Jianlin (chairman); Ding Benxi (丁本锡) (president)
- Services: Construction; Diversified investments Entertainment & Media; Financial services Health care High technology Hospitality; Industrial manufacturing Real estate development Retail; Sports
- Revenue: ▲CN¥257.371 billion (US$31.7 billion) (2018)
- Net income: ▲CN¥13.450 billion (US$2.06 billion) (2013)
- Total assets: ▲CN¥564.250 billion (US$86.15 billion) (2014)
- Owner: Dalian Hexing Investment Co. (owned by Wang family)
- Number of employees: 130,000
- Divisions: Wanda Cinemas; Wanda Media
- Subsidiaries: Sunseeker International; Infront Sports & Media; Wuzhou Film Distribution; Competitor Group
- Website: wanda-group.com

Wanda Group
- Simplified Chinese: 万达集团
- Traditional Chinese: 萬達集團
Transcriptions
Standard Mandarin
- Hanyu Pinyin: Wàndá Jítuán

Alternative Chinese name
- Simplified Chinese: 大连万达
- Traditional Chinese: 大連萬達
Transcriptions
Standard Mandarin
- Hanyu Pinyin: Dàlián Wàndá

Wanda Group (Chinese: 万达集团; pinyin: Wàndá Jítuán), or the Dalian Wanda Group (大连万达), is a Chinese multinational conglomerate founded in Dalian, Liaoning, and headquartered in Beijing. The conglomerate's core businesses are a private property developer and an entertainment company, effectively acting as the owner of Wanda Cinemas and the Hoyts Group line of cinema chains.

With investments within mainland China and globally, the Dalian Wanda group has investments across many industries including construction, entertainment, media, industrial manufacturing, financial services, high technology, hospitality, real estate, retail, health care, and sports. It ranked 380th on the Fortune Global 500 List in 2017. Also in 2017, its assets amounted to 700 billion yuan and an annual revenue of 227.4 billion yuan ($35.29 billion). Wanda Cultural Industry Group is one of China's cultural enterprises, which includes movie theaters as well as sports and film production assets, and contributed 28% or $10.85 billion to overall revenue. Wanda Group ranks 28th on the 2020 China Top 500 Private Enterprises List.

== History ==
The company was founded in Dalian, Liaoning, in 1988 as a residential real estate company by Chinese businessman and investor Wang Jianlin. Incorporated in 1992, the company was "one of the first shareholding companies in the People's Republic of China" after the reform and opening up. The company started to use the name "Wanda" since then. "Wàn" (Chinese: 万) means ten thousand, and "Dá" (Chinese: 达) means to reach or attain. In combination, the company's name is a slogan aspiring to be able to reach everything.

Jiandai Savings Bank is a Chinese private joint-stock commercial bank established in 19 July 1989 merged with CUSB (China United Savings Bank) in 1 September 1999 is a joint venture with and backed by Industrial and Commercial Bank of China, Ping An Insurance and JPMorgan Chase is a ceased operations defunct 25 December 2019, CUSB transferred merged with ICBC not owned by JPMorgan Chase (China) Limited.

=== Diversification push ===
Since 2005, Dalian Wanda and other prominent Chinese real estate companies such as Evergrande have made numerous forays into "alternative, income-generating businesses away from the income-producing Chinese property market." The Financial Times noted that Dalian Wanda was the "most aggressive" company in pursuing this strategy, pointing to its 2012 acquisition of American cinema chain AMC Theatres and 2013 purchase of British yachtmaker Sunseeker. It noted that it was also "building theme parks across China, and has a joint venture with Tencent and Baidu to set up an e-commerce platform".

Dalian Wanda acquired the American cinema operator AMC Theatres in May 2012 for US$2.6 billion, the largest Chinese acquisition of an American company to that date. The acquisition went through successfully in August 2012, making Wanda Cinemas the world's largest cinema operator. As of 2016, Wanda owned approximately 6% of all commercial movie screens in China, and about 13% in the U.S. The company made major changes in AMC theater design and layout, including generously sized reclining seats, waiter service, and expanded food and drink offerings. AMC's value more than doubled in the 18 months following the acquisition, and by the end of 2014 Wanda reaped a reported profit of about US$900 million. As of 2021, Dalian Wanda no longer has control of AMC.

In June 2013, Dalian Wanda planned to invest $1.1 billion to develop a new five-star hotel in London next to the Thames River in Vauxhall, South London, as part of the Nine Elms regeneration. Mayor of London Boris Johnson welcomed this move. The building was said to become "Western Europe's tallest residential building" until plans were scrapped in 2015. In June 2013, Dalian Wanda acquired Sunseeker International, a British luxury yacht manufacturer used in the James Bond movies, for $500 million. This acquisition gave Wanda a 92 percent stake in the company.

In January 2015, Dalian Wanda purchased an office building in Sydney, Australia, from American alternative investment management firm Blackstone Group for around US$327 million. The company is "aggressively expanding overseas to move away from China's property market, which has been hit by a slowing economy". In June 2015, Wanda Cinemas announced that it had acquired Australian cinema chain Hoyts. In Chile it was acquired by Cinépolis, in Uruguay by Life Cinemas, and in Argentina by Cinemark. In November 2015, an announcement was made regarding the formation of a holding company, Wanda Film Holdings, with the purpose of consolidating all of Wanda Group's film-related assets under one entity.

Dalian Wanda developed a skyscraper in Chicago initially called Wanda Vista, designed by the Chicago-based architect Jeanne Gang, which would become the city's third-tallest building and the tallest building in the world designed by a woman, passing Chicago's Aqua Tower (also designed by Jeanne Gang).

On January 11, 2016, Wanda Group acquired the American film production and mass media company Legendary Entertainment for $3.5 billion. The acquisition of Legendary made Wanda Film Holdings the highest revenue-generating film production company in the world.

In May 2016, Wanda Group acquired Propaganda GEM and Hoolai Games. The entertainment marketing and product placement agency and gaming company eventually became part of Wanda Group's entertainment arm. Wanda Group also owns 20 percent of Mtime, a Chinese film website.

In September 2016, Wanda announced a major partnership with Sony Pictures Entertainment, in which it would take minority investments in a number of upcoming releases. Sony stated that Wanda planned to "highlight the China element in the films in which it invests". The deal came in the wake of Wanda's failed bid to acquire a stake in Paramount Pictures.

In November 2016, Wanda announced it would acquire the American television production company Dick Clark Productions for around $1 billion. However, the deal fell through, with Bloomberg citing increasing regulation of Chinese investments both domestically and in the United States, and Deadline.com citing financial struggles in Wanda's real estate business.

In May 2017, Wanda announced it would invest US$3.3 billion by 2024 in EuropaCity, a mega commercial real estate project near Paris's Charles de Gaulle Airport that would boast of a theme park, attractions, cultural exhibitions, retail shops, outdoor sports venues and restaurants over about 200 acres. It's Wanda's biggest-ever single project in Europe. Its other offshore real estate interests include a major development on the banks of London's River Thames and plans for an industrial park in India at a US$10 billion investment.

In July 2017, Wanda initiated the official opening of Danzhai Wanda Village, a tourism project valued at US$200 million aimed at alleviating the socioeconomic struggles faced by the community of Danzhai. On July 14, 2017, it was reported that Wanda was selling a number of theme parks and hotels for US$9.3 billion to Chinese property developer Sunac. On August 5, 2017, Wanda invested US$2.14 billion in the Chinese health care industry and launched the Health Care Group in joint cooperation with the British health care services provider, International Hospital Group.

On August 9, 2017, Dalian Wanda Group announced the combined acquisitions of Wanda Culture Travel Innovation Group and Wanda Hotel Management Co. respectively in a major corporate restructuring throughout the conglomerates hospitality division. In a filing posted on the Hong Kong Stock Exchange, Wanda Hotel Development said it will acquire Wanda Travel for RMB6.3 billion, paid either in cash, the issue of shares and/or convertible bonds, with share prices determined by the company's closing price on Aug. 8 at HK$1.16 per share. Wanda Hotel Development would acquire Wanda Hotel Management for a cash price of RMB750 million.

In September 2017, Wanda launched a technology start-up accelerator project in China. Fifteen high-technology start-ups were selected for the first program, which offered access to Wanda resources, private equity support and venture seed capital. The project was present as part of Wanda's expansion into China's technology sector.

On September 28, 2017, S&P downgraded Dalian Wanda Commercial Properties to BB. In 2017, Wanda derived around 49 percent of its revenue from Dalian Wanda Commercial Properties Co. 28% or $10.85 billion, of total revenue was contributed by Wanda's cultural division, including cinemas, sports, and film production-related assets.

On January 29, 2018, Tencent, Suning, JD.com, and Sunac signed strategic investment agreements with Wanda Commercial, with plans to invest about RMB 34 billion to acquire Wanda Commercial's 14% equity interest.

On February 5, 2018, Wanda Group signed a strategic investment agreement with Alibaba Group and Cultural Investment Holdings. The 2 parties will invest 7.8 billion yuan for Wanda Film Holding's 12.77% stake. Of which, Alibaba invests 4.68 billion yuan and CIS invests 3.12 billion yuan, becoming the second and third largest shareholders after the transaction. Wanda Group remains the controlling shareholder with 48.09% of shares in Wanda Film.

On April 28, 2018, the Qingdao Movie Metropolis, a nearly RMB 50 billion industrial investment project, was completed after four years and seven months of construction. The Qingdao Movie Metropolis covers a land area of 166 hectares.

In May 2018, Wanda, Tencent, and Gaopeng reached a mutual agreement to establish a collaborative internet technology initiative aimed at developing an innovative consumer model that seamlessly merges the realms of online and offline commerce. Among the three companies, the breakdown of the JV's shareholdings was as follows: Wanda Group's Wanda Commercial Management Group (51%), Tencent (42.48%), and Gaopeng (6.52%).

=== Initial public offering ===
In December 2014, Dalian Wanda Commercial Properties, the group's property division, raised $3.7 billion in an initial public offering on the Hong Kong Stock Exchange, the "most money a real estate company has raised in the public markets." Windfall profits following the IPO made founder Wang Jianlin worth more than $25 billion, effectively making him one of China's richest businessmen and investors.

In 2016, the Wanda Group sought to privatize Dalian Wanda Commercial Properties less than 18 months after the unit's floated listing on the Hong Kong stock exchange. Standard & Poor was concerned that the move would weaken Wanda Commercial's business transparency.

=== Sports ===
On January 20, 2015, it was reported that Wang Jianlin was buying a 20 percent stake in La Liga club Atlético Madrid. The purchase was finalized March 31, 2015, when the company Wanda Madrid Investment, a subsidiary of Dalian Wanda Group, officially become a partial owner of Atlético Madrid after gaining control of 726,707 shares, representing a 20 percent ownership stake of the entire team. The purchase price was valued at €44,983,163.30, or €61.90 per share. The Group sold 17% of its stake to Israeli businessman Idan Ofer on 14 February 2018 for an undisclosed amount.

In February 2015, Dalian Wanda won an auction to purchase Infront Sports & Media, a sports marketing company based in Zug, Switzerland, for $1.2 billion. Infront distributes broadcasting rights for some of the world's biggest sporting events; for example, it had the exclusive sales rights to broadcast FIFA's events from 2015 to 2022, including the 2018 and 2022 World Cups. According to Wang Jianlin himself, "the acquisition is expected to help boost the viability of sports in China as well as to amplify Wanda's visibility and influence in global sports."

Wanda Plaza in Wuhan, Hubei.

In August 2015, Dalian Wanda had acquired World Triathlon Corporation, an American sports promotion company promoting and licensing various triathlon competitions including the Ironman, for $650 million.

In November 2015, it was announced that Dalian Wanda created a sports division within the company, with the purpose of housing the entirety of Wanda Group's portfolio of sports-related assets.

In March 2016, FIFA announced that Wanda would be a major sponsor for international events until 2030. In September of the same year, Wanda Group announced a media and sponsorship deal with Badminton World Federation through its subsidiary, Infront Sports & Media.

In June 2017, the Wanda Group purchased Competitor Group (operator of the Rock 'n' Roll Marathon Series). Also that year, the company purchased the naming rights for the Estadio de la Comunidad de Madrid, home of association football club Atlético Madrid, which was renamed the Wanda Metropolitano.

In late February 2018, Wanda Group took control of Chinese Super League team Dalian Professional, though the decision was not officially announced. Wanda also signed Yannick Carrasco and Nicolas Gaitan from Atlético Madrid right after selling the club's shares. Wanda Group was also one of the organizers and sponsors of the Tour of Guangxi.

== Operations ==
Wanda Group has its headquarters in the Wanda Plaza (Chinese: 万达广场) in Beijing's Chaoyang District, where it moved in 2009. In May 2015, Dalian Wanda Group announced that it was in the process of relocating its corporate headquarters to Shanghai, which would become the third Chinese city to host the company's headquarters. In 2013, the company's assets totaled 380 billion yuan ($62.8 billion), its annual income reached 186.6 billion yuan ($30.8 billion) and net profits exceeded 12.5 billion yuan ($2.06 billion). In early 2014, Wanda bought the property of One Beverly Hills, and later overcame the exit of its local development partner, as well as bitter objections and lawsuits filed by Israeli-American entrepreneur Beny Alagem, owner of the Beverly Hilton next door. After Wanda came under fire from Beijing regulators in 2017 over its aggressive overseas dealmaking, its local development partner on project One Beverly Hills walked away. Wanda sold this project in 2017. As of December 31, 2016, Dalian Wanda owned 185 Wanda Plazas, 90 hotels, and 3,947 cinema screens throughout China. By January 2017, the Dalian Wanda Group emerged as China's largest film exhibitor, with Shanghai Film Group ranked second.

In July 2017, the Chinese Central Government introduced new measures that bar state-owned banks from providing new loans to private Chinese firms to curb their foreign expansion. According to media reports, the measures were approved directly by General Secretary Xi Jinping. Next to Wanda Group, the measures also targeted HNA Group Co., Anbang Insurance Group as well as Fosun International Ltd. Chairman Wang Jianlin responded by announcing that the company would focus on investing into the domestic market, and sold $9.4 billion worth of assets, including 77 hotels and a 91 percent stake in 13 theme parks to a smaller Chinese competitor.

In October 2018, Dalian Wanda exited the domestic Chinese theme park business by selling off its theme parks and its corresponding management companies to the Chinese property developer Sunac for 6.3 billion yuan (US$900 million). In addition, the deal encompassed the film and television production studio established by Wanda in Qingdao.

== Sponsorships ==
Since 2011, Dalian Wanda has been the major sponsor of the Chinese Super League football league. From 1994 to 2000, it was the primary sponsor for the Dalian Shide F.C. (then named Dalian Wanda F.C.), during which time the club won four titles in the Chinese top-tier Jia-A League.

The "China's Future Football Stars" project that kicked off in 2013, was being funded by the Wanda Group with an initial phase-I investment of at least 200 million yuan (approximately $32.5 million), the biggest sponsorship in domestic youth sports development since 1949. The program would see 30 young footballers sent to Spain each year for a three-year training program that would consist of football training, as well as education in Spanish language and local culture.

On March 18, 2016, Wanda signed a deal with FIFA to provide sponsorship at the next four World Cup competitions, up until 2030. Although it is still unclear as to how much money has changed hands, and also which Wanda Subsidiaries will be appearing. This deal made Wanda the first Chinese First-Tier FIFA Sponsor. On December 9, 2016, Wanda signed a deal with Atlético Madrid to have the new stadium named after the Wanda Group. The new stadium's name is Wanda Metropolitano. At the time of deal, Wanda Group owned 20% of the Spanish football club.

In September 2019, the IAAF announced in Doha that the Wanda Group would become the title partner of the Diamond League for ten years from 2020. As part of this collaboration, Infront, a Wanda Sports Group company, has signed a five-year agreement with the IAAF and the Diamond League for the international media rights to the elite track and field circuit in 2025.

== See also ==
- Chinese property bubble (2005–2011)
- Real estate in China
