= Audi Field =

Soccer stadium in Washington, D.C.

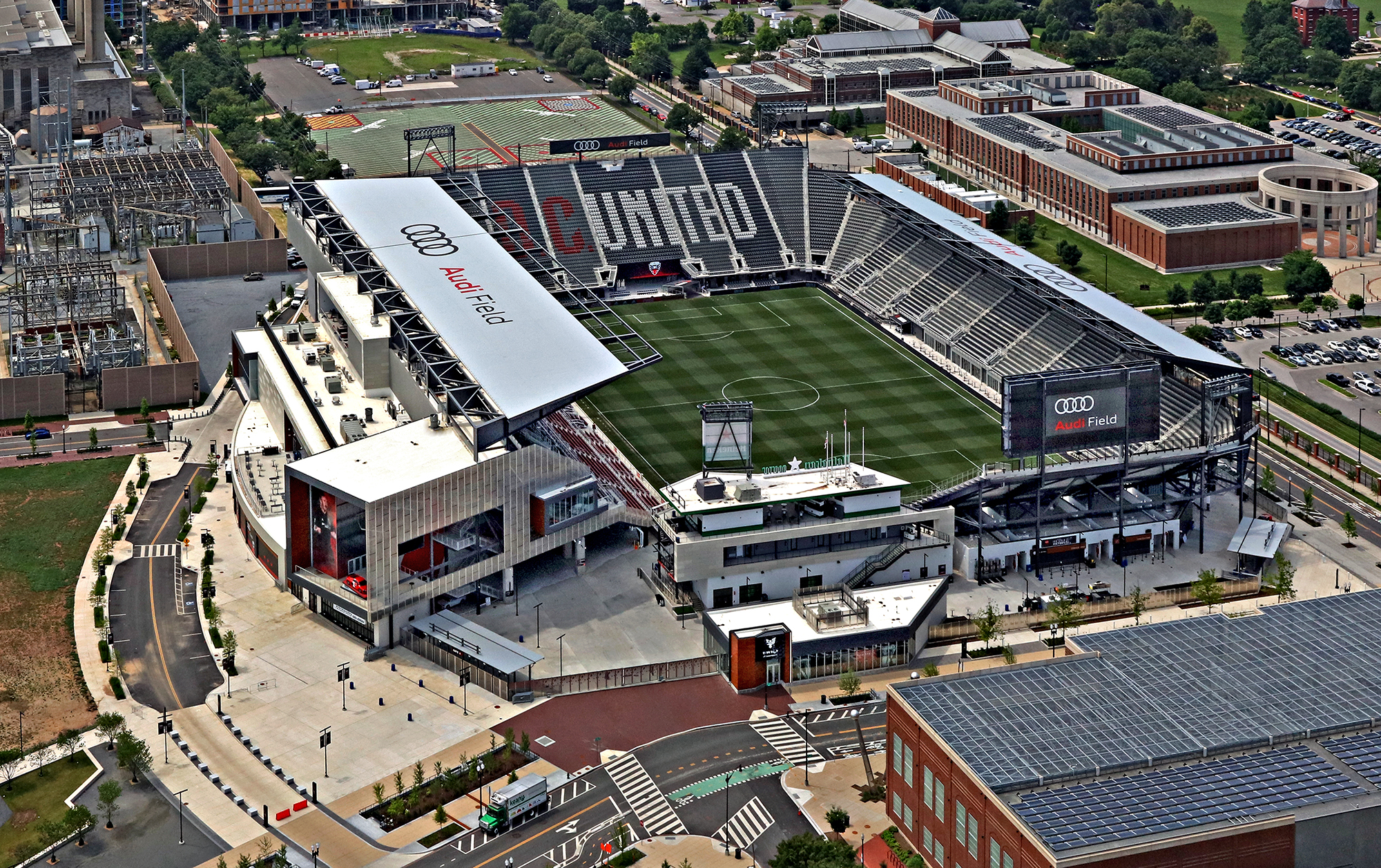
- Aerial view of the stadium in 2019

- Location within District of Columbia Location within Chesapeake Bay Location within the United States
- Address: 100 Potomac Avenue SW
- Location: Washington, D.C., U.S.
- Coordinates: 38.868411°N 77.012869°W
- Owner: District of Columbia
- Operator: D.C. United
- Capacity: 20,000
- Surface: Bermuda grass
- Field size: 115 yd × 75 yd (105 m × 69 m)
- Current use: Soccer; Football; Rugby
- Public transit: Washington Metro: at Navy Yard–Ballpark

Construction
- Groundbreaking: February 27, 2017
- Opened: July 9, 2018 (ribbon cutting); July 14, 2018 (first game)
- Cost: $450 million
- Architects: Populous; Marshall Moya Design
- General contractor: Turner Construction Company

Tenants
- D.C. United (MLS) (2018–present); Washington Spirit (NWSL) (2018–present); Loudoun United (USLC) (2019); DC Defenders (UFL) (2020–present); DC Power (USLS) (2024–present)

Website
- audifield.com

Audi Field is a soccer-specific stadium in the Buzzard Point neighborhood of Washington, D.C. It is the home of the D.C. United, Washington Spirit, and DC Power FC soccer teams, and the DC Defenders football team. The stadium has a capacity of 20,000. Previously, D.C. United had explored sites in the Washington metropolitan area. Following the failure of an initial stadium proposal in 2006, D.C. United made two additional stadium proposals that also failed to be built. In January 2011, the club explored using previously unused land at Buzzard Point to build a stadium; this was confirmed in July 2013, when Buzzard Point was announced as the stadium location. The ground-breaking ceremony occurred in February 2017, with construction completed in July 2018.

In North American competitions, the stadium is known as Washington, D.C. Stadium due to advertising rules.

== Site selection ==
=== Early proposals ===
D.C. United and Major League Soccer commissioner Don Garber raised concerns about scheduling conflicts with the Washington Nationals at RFK Stadium in July 2004, with Garber stating that a soccer-specific stadium in Washington, D.C. "needs to become a priority". Later that year, D.C. United unveiled a proposal to build a 24,000-seat stadium at Poplar Point along the Anacostia River, to open in time for the 2007 season. The stadium's size was later increased to 27,000 and incorporated into a mixed-use development on the site to revitalize the Anacostia neighborhood, with the support of Ward 8 councilmember Marion Barry after he initially opposed the stadium.

The stadium project was neglected by the city's leadership during the debate over a baseball stadium at Navy Yard. After a change of ownership for D.C. United in January 2007, the $200 million stadium project was moved into public review, where it drew criticism over its public financing, gentrification, and displacement of residents. By mid-July, the Poplar Point plan was abandoned and D.C. United began looking at other locations for the stadium.

Despite the failed bid, then-Mayor Adrian Fenty opted to have a closed-door meeting in February 2008 to discuss the city funding $150 million for the club. However, despite a short-lived renewed interest, when the D.C. Council recessed in July 2008, the plan never was brought up, and ultimately died after the main developer for the Poplar Point project withdrew their funding.

In February 2009, the team announced plans for a new stadium in nearby Prince George's County, Maryland, close to FedExField. This proposal ran into similar trouble, however, when the Prince George's County Council voted to send a letter to the Maryland General Assembly opposing the stadium plan.

=== Poplar Point ===
Originally, D.C. United proposed building a stadium at Poplar Point on the Anacostia riverfront in Washington, D.C. as part of a planned 110-acre (0.45 km^{2}) mixed-use development that would have included a hotel, offices, housing, and retail. Plans were formulated as early as 2005 and were formally announced in January 2007.

However, in July 2007, the talks stalled between the team and city officials. There were disputes over the financial arrangements proposed by the team, which would have the city providing $200 million in subsidies and development rights while the team assumed construction costs. In January 2008, the team announced it was looking at other possible sites in the area for construction of the new stadium.

In February 2008, Washington, D.C., Mayor Adrian Fenty suggested at a closed-door city council meeting that the city might offer as much as $150 million towards the costs of building a soccer stadium at Poplar Point. There was apparently renewed interest on the part of the city in providing public funds for the stadium at Poplar Point. However, in July 2008, the D.C. Council recessed without considering the proposed stadium plan.

With sites in Maryland entering the discussion, negotiations continued throughout 2008 before collapsing in early 2009 as the developer pulled out of the project.

=== Prince George's County ===
Maryland first expressed an interest in United as talks stalled in summer 2007. In February 2009, United co-owner Victor MacFarlane announced the team would seek a new stadium in Prince George's County.

However, county officials began expressing concerns about revenue from the stadium in March. On April 7, the Prince George's County Council voted to outline its concern to the Maryland General Assembly about proposed state legislation that would authorize a feasibility study for the new stadium. The legislation stalled in the Maryland State House and died without the support of the Prince George's Council.

Following the failure of the Prince George's County proposal, United began surveying fans about the possibility of relocating to Loudoun County, Virginia; Frederick County, Virginia; or Montgomery County, Maryland. However, no public negotiations ever began.

=== Baltimore ===
In October 2009, Baltimore mayor Sheila Dixon asked the Maryland Stadium Authority to explore building a soccer stadium to serve as D.C. United's home, as well as to host concerts, lacrosse games, and other events. A potential location mentioned for the stadium was the 42-acre (170,000 m^{2}) Westport Waterfront project, and the proposed stadium would have had access to light rail and Interstates 95 and 295.

Meanwhile, in March 2010, MLS commissioner Don Garber criticized Washington, D.C., politicians for how long it had taken to find D.C. United a permanent home stadium.

Discussions continued with Baltimore and other sites in Maryland, with a feasibility study released in December 2010. However, the club opted to refocus its efforts on finding a location within the District of Columbia.

=== Loudoun County ===
In May 2015, team officials visited potential sites in Loudoun County, Virginia, and met with county and state officials about building a stadium in Northern Virginia rather than Washington. Virginia Governor Terry McAuliffe's economic development team suggested sites in Woodbridge, Virginia, and Loudoun, while Loudoun County officials had multiple meetings with team officials. In a letter to the team, Loudoun economic development director Buddy Rizer wrote that a stadium in Virginia would be $38 million cheaper than in D.C. and would be ready by the 2017 season, which the team claimed was not possible in Washington.

=== Buzzard Point ===
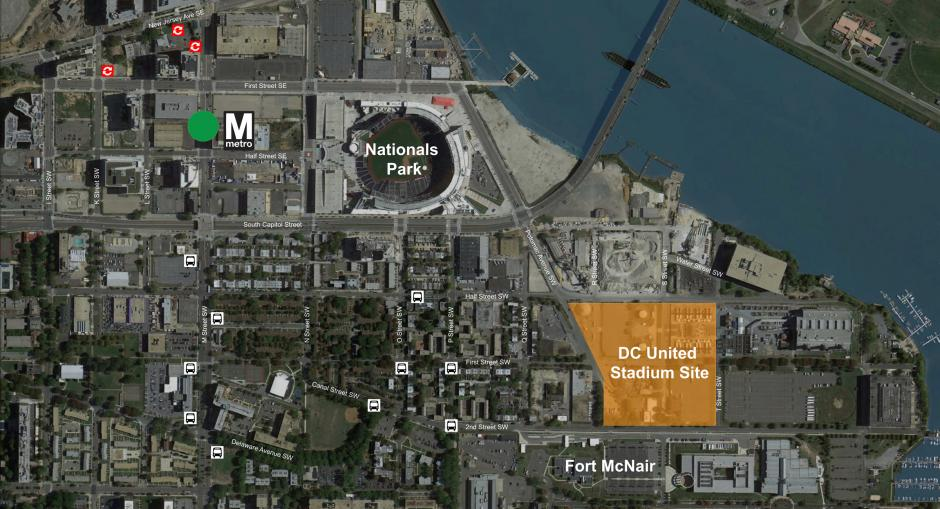
Proposed location relative to Nationals Park and Navy Yard–Ballpark Station

In January 2011, the Web site Greater Greater Washington reported that the club was looking into building a stadium in the Buzzard Point neighborhood in the city. The project involved land owned by the Akridge Development Co. only a few blocks from Nationals Park. By May, according to The Washington Post, the team was also considering a stadium at a site near the Capital City Market (now known as Union Market) and the Westport neighborhood of Baltimore.

In late May 2012, D.C. United was sold to a group led by Indonesian businessman Erick Thohir and attorney Jason Levien, with former principal owner William Chang remaining as a minority partner. The new owners said Buzzard Point remained their preferred option for a new stadium site. A few days after the sale was announced, The Washington Post obtained a confidential draft report, commissioned by the Greater Washington Sports Alliance (a private, nonprofit foundation), which said a 24,000-seat stadium would cost $157 million to build (which did not include the price of land). Construction of the stadium could generate $19.5 million in wages and $38 million in spending. The completed stadium would likely employ 600 to 800 part- and full-time jobs and generate $5.5 million to $7.3 million a year in tax revenue. The study assumed the stadium would include an $82 million mixed-use development as well.

== Financing and construction ==
On July 25, 2013, the District of Columbia and D.C. United announced a tentative deal to build a $300 million, 20,000–25,000-seat stadium at Buzzard Point. The deal required the District of Columbia to obtain the Akridge land at Buzzard Point in exchange for cash and title to the Frank D. Reeves Municipal Center (the city's primary government office building, located in the desirable Shaw neighborhood). D.C. United would contribute $150 million to construct the stadium on the city-owned land, which it would lease for 20 to 35 years. The deal also gave D.C. United the right to build restaurants, bars, and even a hotel nearby. The Buzzard Point plan—formally termed the District of Columbia Soccer Stadium Act of 2014—was approved by the D.C. City Council on December 17, 2014.

The December legislation significantly revised the July 2013 agreement. No longer would the city give Akridge a building and cash; now, the city would pay fair market value for the Akridge land. If a deal could not be reached through negotiation, the legislation gave the city the right to use eminent domain to seize the land. In another revision, the city agreed to contribute the $150 million to purchase land for the stadium. $89 million of this amount was for land acquisition. Another $61 million would be to improve utilities, remove toxic and hazardous wastes, and clear the land for construction. D.C. United also agreed to spend at least $150 million for stadium construction. The legislation did not provide the club with $7 million in sales tax breaks it sought, but did give it $43 million in property tax credits. Outgoing Mayor Vincent Gray signed the bill into law on December 30 as one of the final acts of his term.

Negotiations between the city and Akridge began in January 2015. D.C. Council Chairman Phil Mendelson was downbeat about the talks, saying the two sides were "very far apart" on a price. In February, club officials estimated that the stadium would take 14 to 16 months to construct. Mayor Muriel Bowser, Gray's successor, budgeted $106.3 million in fiscal 2016 to acquire the stadium site, add infrastructure (such as water, sewer, electrical, and natural gas lines), and remove toxic hazards at the site. The budget provided for borrowing $106 million and reprogramming $32 million away from the city's school modernization program to pay for the city's stadium costs. The D.C. City Council began working on legislation to permanently close several city streets that crossed the stadium land in April 2015.

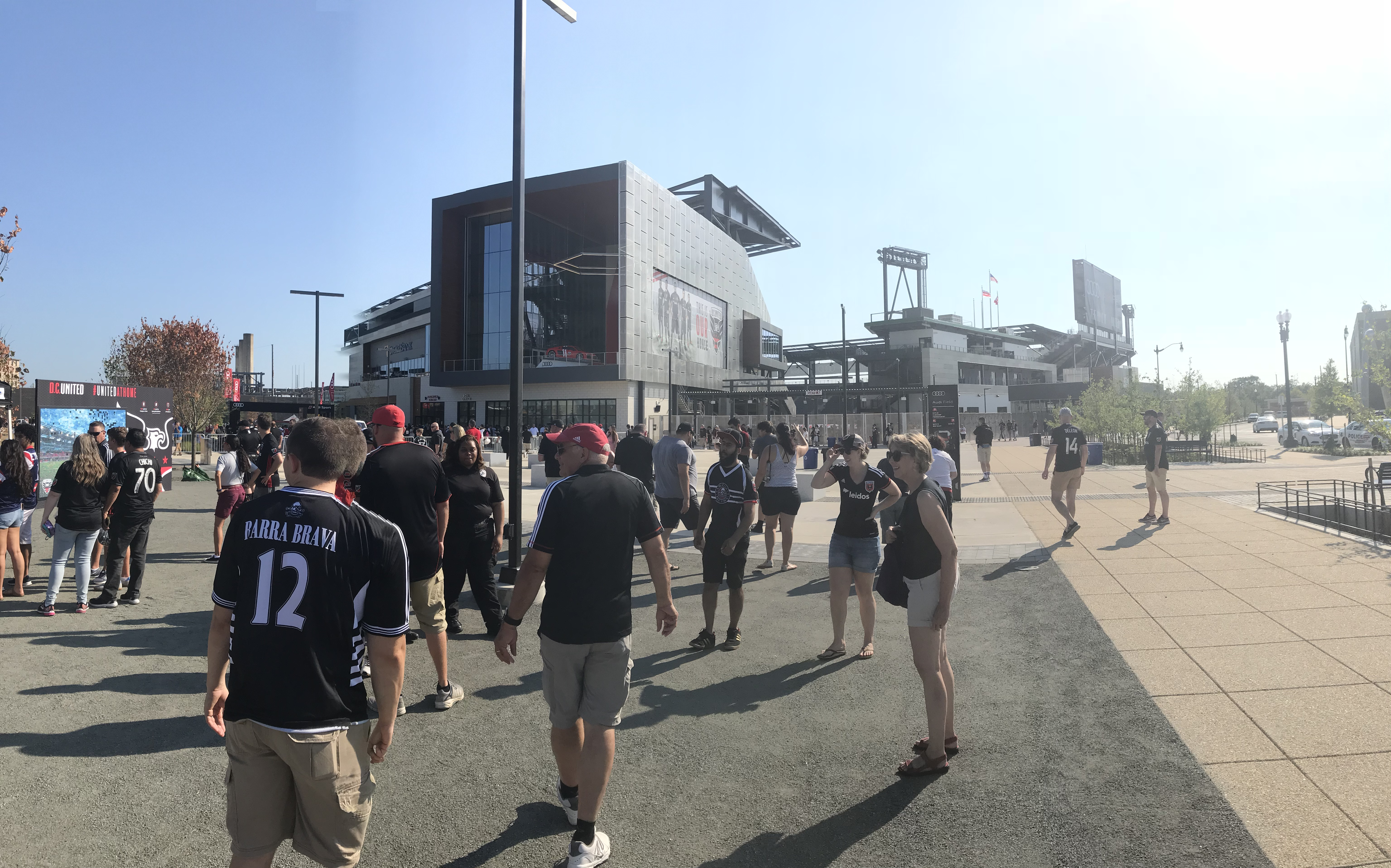
The entrance to Audi Field before the opening match on July 14, 2018

As the city and club came close to finalizing its lease agreement in May, D.C. United began talking with city, county, and state officials in Virginia about abandoning the District of Columbia and constructing a stadium in Northern Virginia. The talks became public knowledge on June 1. D.C. officials were outraged, although they conceded the initiative was probably just a negotiating tactic to get the city to sweeten its deal. The controversy did not appear to harm the talks, as on June 8, D.C. United and the city signed a final construction agreement. The agreement required that the facility seat a minimum of 17,000 people and established the term of the lease at 30 years for a nominal $1 per year. The agreement also contained a clause governing land: If the cost of land acquisition rose above $150 million, D.C. United was required to reimburse the city 50% of the excess (although the club's commitment was capped at $10 million). The club was also barred from playing more than an occasional home game away from the Buzzard Point stadium (i.e., barred from relocating for the lease term). Mayor Bowser then submitted the agreement, as well as land purchase agreements and a revised developer agreement, to the City Council for approval. The land purchase agreements paid Pepco $39.3 million for land and $1 million to remove electrical generation equipment from its site, $15.9 million for land owned by Super Salvage, and $10.32 million for land owned by venture capitalist Mark Ein. The cost of the land purchase agreements was offset by a deal for Pepco to purchase a $15 million city-owned parcel of land at 1st and K Streets NW. The council approved the land purchase agreements on June 30, 2015.

Under the terms of the June 8 agreement, D.C. United was required to submit a concept design for the stadium to the city by September 1, 2015. The District of Columbia faced a deadline of September 30, 2015, to use eminent domain to acquire the Akridge land, which forced the club to commit to building a stadium before the city finished purchasing land. On September 30, the District of Columbia filed for eminent domain for the Akridge parcel.

On February 15, 2017, German automobile manufacturer Audi and D.C. United announced a "long-term" naming rights deal for the new stadium. The Washington Post reported the deal was for a minimum of twelve years. Audi's United States headquarters are located in Herndon, Virginia, a suburb of Washington. Construction began two weeks later with a ceremonial groundbreaking.

== Opening and use ==
Audi Field had a ribbon-cutting ceremony on July 9, 2018. The first-ever opening match held in Audi Field was a Major League Soccer match between D.C. United and Vancouver Whitecaps FC on July 14, 2018, which ended in a 3–1 win for D.C. United in front of a sellout crowd of 20,504 people. A sideline reporter was injured after being hit by a piece of the railing before the game.

The grass pitch at Audi Field was criticized following a United States women's national soccer team friendly on July 16, 2024, where patches and discoloration were visible. The stadium had hosted a rugby union friendly the day before and was preparing for a busy fall schedule for three teams—D.C. United, the Washington Spirit, and DC Power FC. The Broccoli City Festival, a two-day music festival, was also scheduled to begin on July 27 ahead of a 2024 Leagues Cup home match for D.C. United. During preparations for the festival, the grass surface was further damaged and forced the Leagues Cup match on July 31 to be relocated to Subaru Park in Chester, Pennsylvania, while a new pitch was scheduled to be installed.

== Public transportation ==
Audi Field is within 1 mile (1.6 km) of the Navy Yard–Ballpark station of the Washington Metro. The station is served by the Green Line. It is also served by Potomac Riverboat Company shuttle services on match days. The DC Circulator system operated buses to the stadium until the 2019 season.

== Sports ==
=== Soccer ===
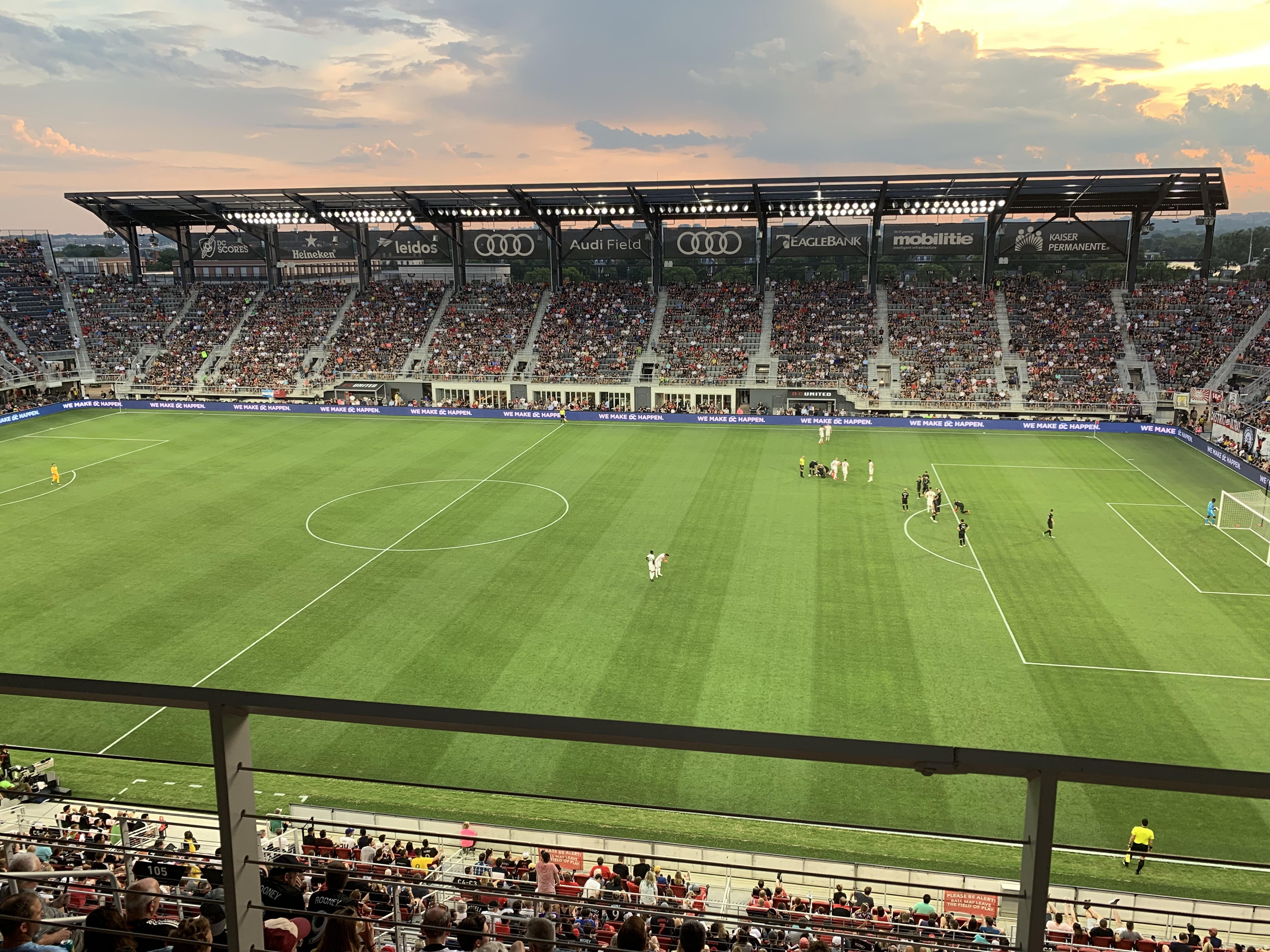
A D.C. United game in 2019

In addition to serving as the home stadium for D.C. United since opening in 2018, Audi Field has also served as the full-time home of the National Women's Soccer League's Washington Spirit since 2023, and the USL Super League's DC Power FC since its inception in 2024. The stadium is nicknamed the "Rowdy Audi" during Spirit games due to its atmosphere and regular sellouts. Despite its use for women's soccer, Audi Field does not have a dedicated home locker room for the Spirit. The team has also moved some matches to other venues due to scheduling conflicts at Audi Field; one planned move was averted after a sponsor bought out a contract to keep Audi Field available.

On August 25, 2018, in a NWSL regular season match, the hometown Washington Spirit lost 1–0 to the visiting Portland Thorns FC. The Spirit returned to Audi Field for two matches in the 2019 season, against the Orlando Pride on August 24 and Reign FC on September 14. The Spirit transitioned toward making Audi Field their primary home venue. In 2020, they played four home games at each of three venues—Audi Field; their original home of the Maryland SoccerPlex in Montgomery County; and Segra Field, home of D.C. United's USL Championship reserve side Loudoun United FC in Leesburg, Virginia. In 2021, the Spirit played seven home games at Audi Field and five at Segra Field. On September 13, 2024, Fort Lauderdale United FC defeated DC Power FC 2-0 in the club's first ever home match played at Audi Field in front of an announced crowd of 4,719.

Audi Field hosted 2022 NWSL Championship as a pre-selected neutral site venue. Portland Thorns FC defeated the Kansas City Current 2–0 with 17,624 fans in attendance; it was also the first time that the NWSL Championship was broadcast in prime time. The stadium was selected to host the 2026 NWSL Championship, which will feature the Spirit and Kansas City Current.

The stadium hosted the 2023 Major League Soccer All-Star Game in July 2023. The game had 20,621 spectators, which is a record for the stadium. This attendance record is followed closely by the 19,897 fans in attendance at the Washington Spirit vs San Diego Wave match on June 15, 2024. Audi Field was one of twelve venues to host the 2025 FIFA Club World Cup.

On September 3, 2018, the Maryland Terrapins men's soccer and Virginia Cavaliers men's soccer teams drew 0–0 in the first collegiate soccer match played at Audi Field. Loudoun United used Audi Field for three home games in their inaugural 2019 season while its permanent venue of Segra Field was under construction.

The United States men's national soccer team played an international friendly match against Jamaica at Audi Field on June 5, 2019. The US lost 1–0. The USMNT played at Audi Field again in a CONCACAF Nations League game against Cuba on October 11, 2019. The US won 7–0. The stadium hosted the United States women's national soccer team send-off game against Costa Rica on July 16, 2024, before the 2024 Summer Olympics in Paris.

Audi Field hosted two friendly matches for Arsenal to play against Washington Spirit on August 18 and against Chelsea on August 25, 2024.

=== Lacrosse ===
In its inaugural season, the Premier Lacrosse League played three games at Audi Field the weekend of July 6–7, 2019. In its third season, the Premier Lacrosse League played its championship game at Audi Field on September 19, 2021.

=== Rugby union ===
In July 2024 the USA Eagles (Men's side) hosted Scotland in the first international rugby union match at Audi Field. The U.S. lost 7–42 in front of 17,418 fans.

It was announced in March 2025 that Audi Field would host its second USA Eagles test match, for both the Men's and Women's sides in July 2025, with the men playing England and the Women playing Fiji.

Date	Side	Home	Result	Away	Competition	Attendance	Ref.
July 12, 2024	Men	United States	7–42	Scotland	Test match	17,418	
July 19, 2025	Men	United States	5–40	England	Test match	19,079	
July 19, 2025	Women	United States	31–24	Fiji	Test match	15,198	

=== American football ===
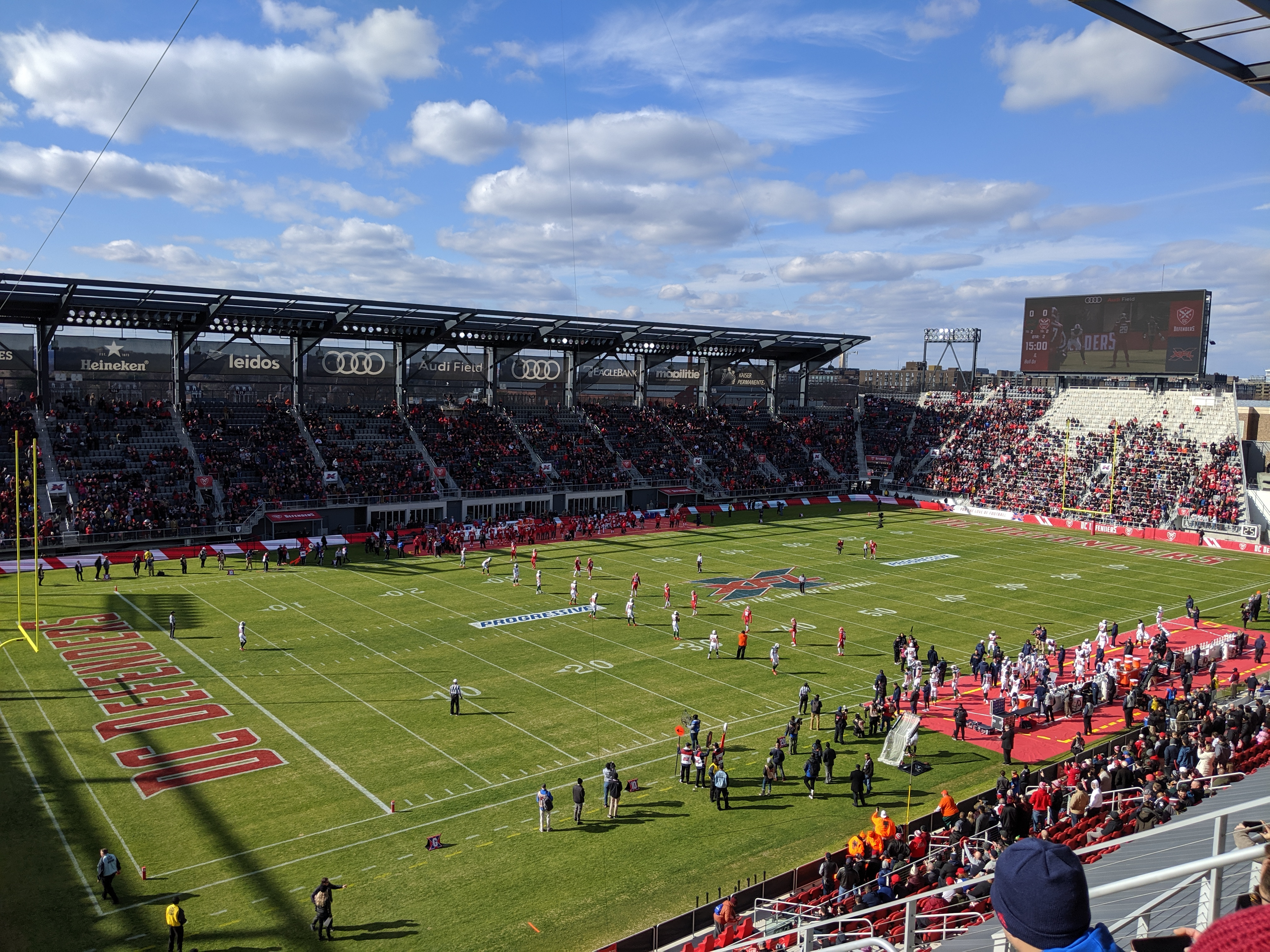
First ever XFL kickoff between the DC Defenders and Seattle Dragons at Audi Field

In 2020, the DC Defenders of the XFL began playing their home games at Audi Field. Their first game was on February 8, 2020, with the Defenders defeating the Seattle Dragons by a score of 31–19. After three home games, the XFL season was suspended and ultimately canceled due to the COVID-19 pandemic. The Defenders won all three games at Audi Field.

Upon the XFL's return in 2023, the Defenders resumed playing their home games at Audi Field, winning their first game back at the venue, once again against Seattle, 22–18. Audi Field was chosen to host the 2026 United Bowl, which was played on June 13, 2026, between the Defenders and the Louisville Kings.

Audi Field hosted the 2026 Secretaries' Cup between the United States Merchant Marine and Coast Guard Academies.

== International matches ==
=== Men's matches ===
Date	Winning Team	Result	Losing Team	Tournament	Spectators
June 5, 2019	Jamaica	1–0	United States	International Friendly	17,719
October 11, 2019	United States	7–0	Cuba	2019–20 CONCACAF Nations League A	13,784
September 27, 2022	Peru	4–1	El Salvador	International Friendly	
June 15, 2023	Venezuela	1–0	Honduras	International Friendly	
July 19, 2023	(England) Arsenal	5–0	(United States) (Canada) MLS All-Stars	2023 MLS All-Star Game	20,621
September 27, 2026	Bolivia	0–2	Paraguay	International Friendly	

=== Women's matches ===
Date	Winning Team	Result	Losing Team	Tournament	Spectators
September 6, 2022	United States	2–1	Nigeria	International Friendly	18,869
July 16, 2024	United States	0–0	Costa Rica	International Friendly	18,972
August 18, 2024	(England) Arsenal	2–1	(United States) Washington Spirit	Club Friendly	15,062
August 25, 2024	(England) Chelsea	1–0	(England) Arsenal	Club Friendly	17,130
July 2, 2025	United States	3–0	Canada	International Friendly	19,215
October 10, 2026	Spain	2–0	United States	International Friendly	19,220

=== 2025 FIFA Club World Cup ===
Date	Time (UTC−4)	Team #1	Result	Team #2	Spectators
June 18, 2025	21:00	Al Ain (United Arab Emirates)	0–5	(Italy) Juventus	18,161
June 22, 2025	18:00	Red Bull Salzburg (Austria)	0–0	(Saudi Arabia) Al-Hilal	16,167
June 26, 2025	15:00	Wydad AC (Morocco)	1–2	(United Arab Emirates) Al Ain	10,785

== See also ==
- Soccer-specific stadium
- List of Major League Soccer stadiums
- List of National Women's Soccer League stadiums
- Lists of stadiums

Preceded by RFK Stadium	Home of D.C. United; 2018 – present	Succeeded by Current
Preceded by Maryland SoccerPlex	Home of the Washington Spirit; 2019 – present	Succeeded by Current
Preceded by First stadium	Home of the DC Defenders; 2020 – present	Succeeded by Current
