= Harald Griebel =

German sports marketing businessman (born 1940)

Harald Griebel (born 1940) is a German retired sports marketing businessman.

Griebel was employed by Cesar Lüthi at CWL Telesport and Marketing, Infront Sports & Media and Kirch Group. He worked to market and develop the Ice Hockey World Championships on behalf of the International Ice Hockey Federation (IIHF). He was involved in the top division of each World Championship from 1981 to 2008, and other lower divisions and qualifying tournaments for ice hockey at the Olympic Games. He retired at age 68 after the 2008 IIHF World Championship.

Griebel was named the 2009 Paul Loicq Award recipient for outstanding contributions to the IIHF and international ice hockey. He was credited by the IIHF for making the World Championships one of the world's most watched and attended team sport championships.
