= Superfrog Triathlon =

Ironman 70.3 SuperFrog is a half-Ironman triathlon held annually and based on the Silver Strand State Beach, Coronado, California.

== Characteristic ==
The original idea of this multisports endurance event was two-fold: The first was to prepare Navy SEALs to do the Ironman Triathlon. The second was to promote the sport of triathlon in the SEAL Teams where physical training was multi-faceted and competitive spirit is high. The event is open to both military and civilians alike. It also invites tri-athletes with disabilities to participate in the triathlon as individuals or in relay teams. All editions have been carefully monitored and supported by UDT-SEAL Association members and volunteers and officers and men of the Basic Underwater Demolition/SEAL Training department from the Navy Special Warfare Command.

The Superfrog is a traditional swim-bike-run event that covers a course consisting of a two-lap 1.2 miles open ocean swim, a four-lap 56 mile bike course and a five-lap 13.1 mile run. This type of circuit-style racing allows for a central control point where start and finish lines, bike/run transition area, racer aid stations, and spectators view are greatly enhanced. This circuit-style race is presented by Naval Special Warfare and sponsored by MWR, North Island.

The open-ocean swim starts at 7am behind the BUD/S, NSW Center area and finishes behind SEAL Teams Five and Seven. Wheel-chair racers enter the ocean first, followed by individual racers and three-person relay teams.

Previous editions were held in the month of September. The September high surf is usually accompanied by unusually cold water. Upon completion of the swim, the bicycle riders head south from the Amphibious Base along Highway 75. It is flat but can be a little windy in some sections. Competitors in the event have been subjected to 100-degree heat on the highway. In 2011, the half-Ironman triathlon is back to September, being run on the 10 year anniversary of 9/11 - 11 September 2011.

In previous editions several professional triathletes competed in this event, including Bettina Ernst (1996), Paula Newby-Fraser (2002), Heather Fuhr (2006), and Lance Armstrong (2012).

In January 2015, World Triathlon Corporation announced the acquisition of SuperFrog, Inc., owners of the SuperFrog, Super Seal and Seal Sprint triathlons. The SuperFrog Triathlon was rebranded as Ironman 70.3 SuperFrog.

IRONMAN 70.3 Superfrog took place from 2014 to 2019. The event was cancelled in 2020 and 2021 due to COVID before being permanently discontinued.

== Superseal ==
Since 2008, the event is accompanied by the Superseal Olympic distance triathlon (1.5km swim / 40km bike / 10km run).
