= Rock 'n' Roll Liverpool Marathon & 1/2 Marathon =

The Liverpool Rock 'n' Roll Marathon and Half Marathon was a running race that took place in Liverpool, United Kingdom, as part of the Rock & Roll Marathon series, generally held in May. As it was part of the Rock 'n' Roll race series, stages were set up along the route with bands and live entertainment. The race was postponed in 2020 due to the COVID pandemic and was rescheduled for October 2021. In September of that year it was announced that the race would not be returning after their upcoming 2021 event.

== Distances ==
Held over Saturday and Sunday, the event featured one mile, 5K, half marathon and marathon distance races.

== Route ==
Typically the race started at the Albert Dock. The Marathon route headed north towards the city's football stadium before heading back towards the town centre and south towards Sefton Park before returning via the riverfront promenade. The course was drawn up to encompass as many of the city's musical landmarks as possible, including Mathew Street and Penny Lane.

The races finished outside the Liverpool Echo Arena.

== Past winners ==
=== Marathon ===
Year	Date	Time (h:m:s)	Men's winner	Time (h:m:s)	Women's winner
2017	28 May	2:33:53	Neil Smith	2:57:29	Sofia Mattiasson
2016	29 May	2:27:15	Robert Pope	3:00:59	Joanne Nelson
2015	14 Jun	2:29:28	Robert Pope	3:00:33	Joanne Nelson

=== Half Marathon ===
Year	Date	Time (h:m:s)	Men's winner	Time (h:m:s)	Women's winner
2017	28 May	1:10:25	Samuel Pictor	1:21:45	Sinead Tangney
2016	29 May	1:09:44	Dejene Gezimu	1:25:20	Helen Sahgal
2015	14 Jun	1:10:07	Tarus Elly	1:21:56	Michelle Nolan-Hood

== Concert ==
After the race an open air concert was held for finishers and members of the public with bands such as Cast, Republica and Space headlining.
