= Cesar Lüthi =

Swiss sports marketing businessman (1930–2002)

- Born: 6 September 1930; Wohlen, Aargau, Switzerland
- Died: 18 July 2002 (aged 71); Ermatingen, Switzerland
- Known for: Sports marketing businessman
- Awards: IIHF Hall of Fame; Olympic Order

Cesar W. Lüthi (6 September 1930 – 18 July 2002) was a Swiss international sports marketing businessman. He was the founder of CWL Telesport and Marketing, and was involved with advertising for the International Ice Hockey Federation, the German Football Association, and the Olympic Games. He was inducted into the IIHF Hall of Fame in 1998, and received the Olympic Order.

== Career ==
Lüthi was born on 6 September 1930, in Wohlen, Aargau, Switzerland. He began in the sports marketing business during the 1966 World Rowing Championships. He was a pioneer in advertising with the use of revolving billboards. He later became a managing director at Gloria, then formed his own company in 1972 in Kreuzlingen, known as Cesar W. Lüthi Marketing and Sales Promotion (CWL Marketing and Sales Promotion).

His first contract with the Olympic Games was in 1972 at the Olympiahalle in Munich. His company was later renamed CWL Telesport and Marketing, and began a partnership with the International Ice Hockey Federation (IIHF) in 1978 to oversee its media, sponsorship, advertising, and merchandising for IIHF tournaments. In 1980, he purchased the advertising rights for the German Football Association, and hired German footballer Günter Netzer four years later. Lüthi's original IIHF contract was later extended to television rights in 1981 after the Ice Hockey World Championships. He hired Harald Griebel to oversee work at the World Championships.

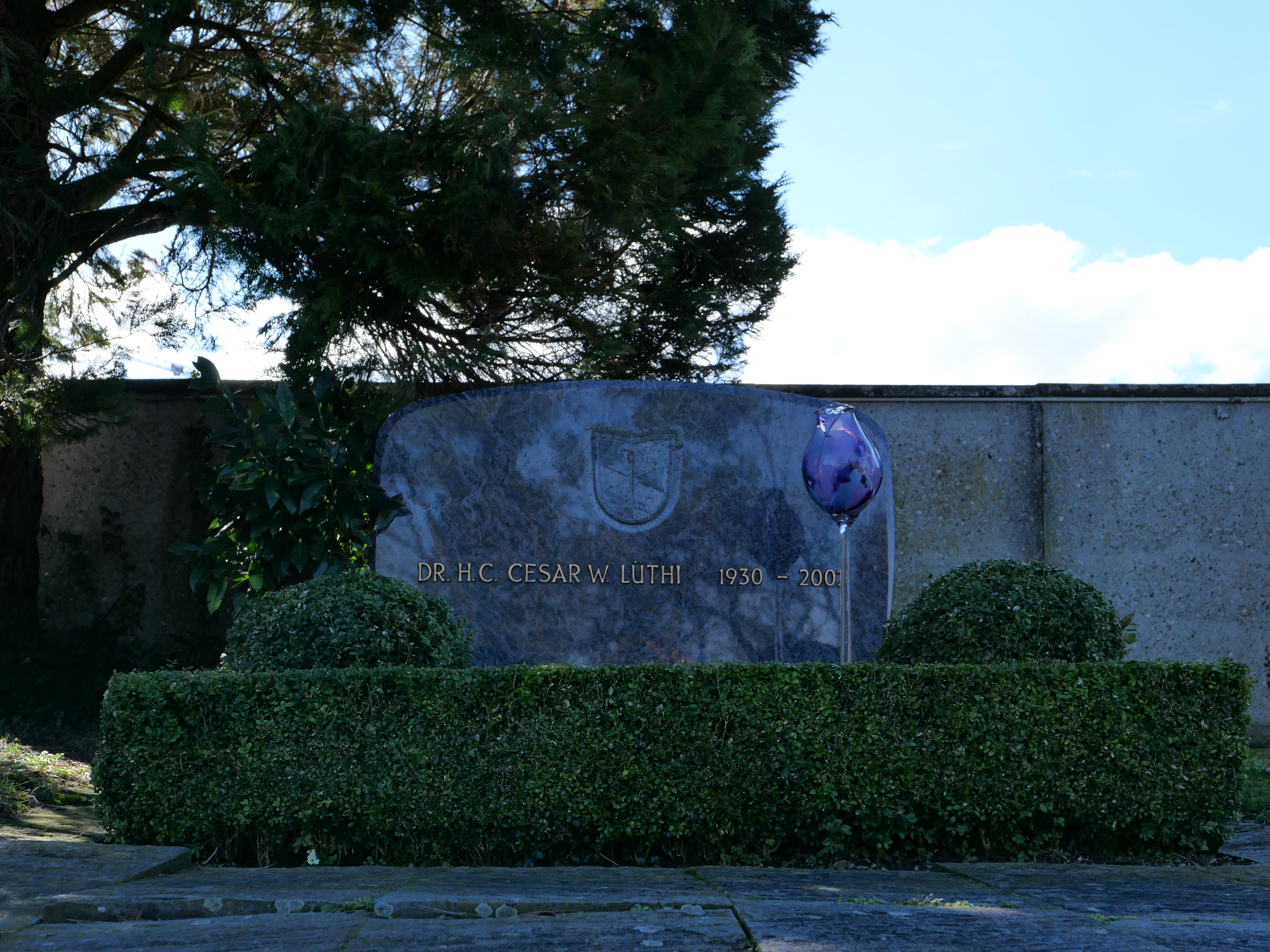
Lüthi's grave at Ermatingen cemetery

Lüthi was inducted into the IIHF Hall of Fame as a builder in 1998. He was also made an honorary member of the IIHF, and received the Olympic Order. In 2000, he sold CWL Telesport and Marketing to Leo Kirch, who incorporated the company into the Kirch Group. Lüthi was once one of the 300 richest Swiss people. The same year, Lüthi moved into his Ermatingen villa, custom-built for approximately 20 million Swiss francs, which was described as a "pearl on Lake Constance". He died at home on the morning of 18 July 2002 after a long illness
