= Ironkids =

Series of triathlons held around the U.S.

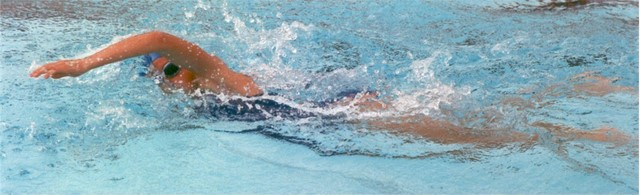
A competitor competing in the swimming portion of the triathlon

The IronKids Triathlon Series is a series of triathlons owned or licensed by the World Triathlon Corporation that is held around the U.S. for children ages 7 to 15. The series started in 1985 and since then more than 40,000 kids have participated, including famous alumni, such as Lance Armstrong.

== Competition ==
The competition is divided by gender and one-year age groups and in age-appropriate distances for swimming, biking and running (in that order). Children 6 to 8 are classified as Juniors. 9 to 11 year old kids are classified as intermediate. The senior group is classified as 12 to 15. The junior group competes in a 50-yard swim, a 2-mile bike ride and a 500-yard run. The intermediate age group goes on a 150-yard swim, a 4-mile bike ride and a 1-mile run. The senior group races on a 300-yard swim, an 8-mile bike ride and a 2-mile run.

The age groups start in heats, with each boys' age groups starting before the girls' age group. The first age group to start are the 14-year-old boys, followed by the 14-year-old girls, and this continues down the age groups to the 6-year old girls, the final group to start.

In addition to the individual race, there are relay divisions where each leg of the triathlon is completed by a different child.

There is also a "challenged IronKids" division for disabled children.

== Kid friendly ==
A unique feature of the IronKids Triathlon Series is that the bike and run portions of the triathlon are held on closed courses, i.e. not on streets open to automobiles. This, and the high number of volunteers who line the entire course, make this a relatively safe and kid-friendly event. The bike and run courses are also run on multiple loops making them viewer friendly.

The IronKids Triathlon Series promotes friendly competition where "Every Finisher is a Winner." Everyone who competes in the triathlon receives a finishers T-shirt, goodie bag, and finishers medal.

== Notable alumni ==
Many world-class triathletes started their triathlon career in the IronKids Triathlon Series including four-time Olympian Hunter Kemper, 2003 ITU Triathlon World Championship silver medalist Laura Reback, and Olympian Nick Radkewich.

== See also ==
- Duathlon
- Ironman Triathlon
- Ironman World Championship
