= World Triathlon Corporation =

Sports event promotion company

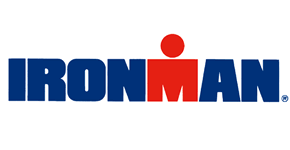
- Type: Subsidiary
- Industry: Sport Event Management; Sports
- Founded: 1991 in Tarpon Springs, Florida
- Founder: Valerie Silk, James Gills, David Voth
- Headquarters: Tampa Bay, Florida
- Key people: Scott DeRue: CEO; Ben Fertic: President
- Products: Ironman Triathlon, Ironman 70.3, Ironman Live, Iron Girl, Ironkids
- Parent: Advance
- Website: ironman.com

The World Triathlon Corporation (WTC) is a sports event promotion company owned by conglomerate Advance Publications, that produces the Ironman Triathlon, Ironman 70.3, the 5150 series of triathlon races, and other sports events.

== History ==
In December, 1989, Dr. James P. Gills and David Voth acquired and purchased the Hawaii Triathlon Corporation, owner of the Ironman Brand, for $3 million from Valerie Silk. Voth was the CEO from 1989 to 1993 followed by David Yates then Lew Friedland in the CEO role. With the Ironman brand, Gills and Voth established the World Triathlon Corporation with the intention of furthering the sport of triathlon and building a multi media and global brand presence. By increasing prize money for both male and female triathletes and developing the Ironman World Series including new associated and licensed IronMan races, IronMan was launched into the mainstream of sports. Ben Fertic, formerly Vice President of Information Systems, joined WTC in 2000 and was involved in the business operations and day-to-day decision making for WTC. Fertic became CEO of WTC in 2004.

During Fertic's tenure as VP, he created Ironman Live, an online presence of Ironman Triathlon, and transformed WTC into an event production company. In 2007, WTC undertook expansion in producing Ironman events internally, with the inaugural Ironman Louisville. This followed the launch of Ironman 70.3 events in Boise, Idaho, and Providence, Rhode Island.

In 2008, World Triathlon Corporation was purchased by private equity firm Providence Equity Partners for $85 million. CEO Ben Fertic remained at the helm of the business. The following year, in early in 2009, WTC announced the acquisition of Ironman events based in the United States, from North America Sports, a company founded by Canadian Graham Fraser. Employees from North America Sports were expected to remain and manage these events, which included Ironman Coeur d'Alene, Lake Placid, Wisconsin, Florida, Arizona, Ironman 70.3 California, and Ironman 70.3 Florida.

On May 31, 2011, WTC announced that Andrew Messick, who was previously the president AEG, would become CEO of the World Triathlon Corporation. Fertic would continue in his role in serving on the Board of Directors as well as serving in a newly created president position. Messick, who is an Ironman triathlon finisher himself, helped build and direct, among other things, the Tour of California cycling event.

=== Dalian Wanda Group (2015–2020) ===
In Fall 2015, World Triathlon Corporation and the Ironman brand were acquired by Chinese conglomerate Dalian Wanda Group. Wanda Group reached an agreement to purchase 100% of equity for $650 million and the assumption of debt from former owners Providence Equity Partners. Ironman had been in the hands of Providence for seven successful years after they purchased it in 2008. A source for the Wall Street Journal estimated that the WTC is valued at roughly $900 million and represents a quadrupling of Providence's investment in the WTC.

A Wanda Group press release stated that the World Triathlon Corporation's gross revenue has risen at a compounded average growth rate of 40% for four years straight. Net profit has grown at 40% a year. Wanda Group has announced plans to bring Ironman races to China in the future, citing the events have been hosted in over 20 countries worldwide but none yet in China. This was inspired by the success of other Ironman races in Asia, like those in Taiwan, Korea, and Japan.

Dalian Wanda acquired Competitor Group (operator of the Rock 'n' Roll Marathon Series) in 2017; it became a subsidiary of the Ironman Group.

=== Advance (2020–) ===
On March 26, 2020, Advance Publications announced that it would acquire The Ironman group from the Dalian Wanda Group, with Orkila as a co-investor in the company. As part of the deal, Wanda would operate the events in China under a license agreement. On July 21, 2020, the sale was completed.

== Event acquisitions ==
In addition to the North American Sports acquisition in 2009 WTC has acquired several other event management companies and races.

In February 2012 WTC purchased USM Events, owners of Australian triathlons in Geelong, Mooloolaba, and Noosa, as well as the Sydney World Triathlon Series (WTS) race. USM Events also owned and produced a full Ironman distance race in Cairns, Australia called Challenge Cairns. Challenge, a rival to the Ironman brand, did not wish to have WTC running one of the Challenge family of races. As a result, Challenge terminated its contract with USM and Challenge Cairns subsequently became Ironman Cairns. The purchase of USM Events expands WTC's Asia-Pacific triathlon market. The purchase would have placed WTC into International Triathlon Union racing with the Sydney WTS race, but government officials in New South Wales took the option of not extending an agreement to continue staging the Sydney event due to the ongoing logistical and financial investment required.

In June 2013, WTC purchased YWC Sports, a private company that organizes triathlons and endurance sport events in Denmark. YWC Sports was contracted by the Challenge Family to produce the long-distance triathlon races Challenge Copenhagen and Challenge Aarhus. However, Challenge Family CEO Felix Walchshöfer did not wish to have WTC produce a Challenge licensed event and therefore terminated YWC's agreement stating that the sale to WTC constituted a breach of contract. As a result, the Challenge Copenhagen race, which was scheduled to race in August 2013, would be rebranded as Ironman Copenhagen and 50 qualifying spots would be offered up for the 2013 Ironman World Championships. Challenge Aarhus was replaced by Ironman 70.3 Aarhus and debuted in June 2014.

In January 2016 WTC acquired Lagardère Group's endurance sports division. Lagardère was owners of ITU World Triathlon Series races in Hamburg, Abu Dhabi, Kapstadt, Leeds, and Stockholm. The acquisition also greatly expanded WTC's portfolio beyond triathlon adding several cycling events like Cyclassics Hamburg, Velothon Berlin, Velothon Wales, Velothon Copenhagen, Velothon Stockholm, Velothon Stuttgart as well as several running events like the Hamburg Marathon, Hawkes Bay International Marathon, Marathon de Bordeaux, Queenstown Marathon, Music Runs in Germany, the United Kingdom, France, Sweden and South Africa and several multisport events.

- Cape Epic – annual mountain bike stage race held in the Western Cape, South Africa
- Optimum Sports Events (2015) – Owners of Challenge Vichy
- SuperFrog, Inc. (2015) – Multiple events including the Superfrog Triathlon.
- Firstwave Events, LLC. (2015) – Big Kahuna Triathlon and Santa Cruz Half Marathon
- Auckland Marathon (2014)
- Lifesport Properties Inc. (2014) – Owners of the Subaru Western Triathlon Series
- Tritlon Spain SL (2014) – Owners of Challenge Barcelona
- Columbia Triathlon Association, Inc. (2014) – An Ironman race licensee and owners of ChesapeakeMan
- XXtra Mile, LLC (2013) – Owners of the Danskin Triathlon Series, the events were rebranded under the IronGirl banner.
- Sports Promotion UG (2013), Owners of Challenge Kraichgau and Challenge Rügen
- Triangle Sports & Promotion GmbH (2010) – Owners of Ironman Austria, Ironman France, Ironman South Africa, Ironman 70.3 Austria, Ironman 70.3 Monaco, Ironman 70.3 South Africa
- BK Sportpromotions AG (2009) – Owners of Ironman Switzerland and Ironman 70.3 Switzerland
- Xdream Sports & Events GmbH (2009) – Owners of Ironman Germany and Ironman 70.3 Germany
- 5430 Sports (2009) – Multiple events including the Boulder Peak Triathlon
- IronKids (2008) – Race series owned by the Sara Lee Corporation since 1985.

== Event and product licensing ==
WTC holds the rights to use the name "Ironman" for marketing purposes in association with contests consisting of swimming, biking, and running; which is used to license triathlon events around the world. This part is part of the licensing agreement both Marvel and WTC to not use the "Iron Man" and "Ironman" trademarks in ways that would suggest an association with the other or cause brand confusion. The first events to take on Ironman licensing include events in Canada, New Zealand and Australia, all of which formed in the 1980s. Since then, Ironman event licensing has gone global, with the creation of the Ironman 70.3 series in 2005 and the 5150 series beginning in 2011.

The WTC licenses the Ironman and Ironman Triathlon logo and other related marks to various corporations for use in their product lines. An example is the licensing to Timex Group USA of the Ironman Triathlon logo for use in the Timex Ironman watch line that includes the Timex Ironman Datalink series of GPS type watches.

== Former business ventures ==
=== LAVA magazine ===
In March 2010, World Triathlon Corporation announced the start of a triathlon publication called LAVA magazine. At its conception, the magazine was published by John Duke, former publisher of Triathlete Magazine and then Vice President of Global Sales and Media for WTC. LAVA built its initial subscription base from United States athletes who had entered in an Ironman branded event in 2010. The magazine produces 9 issues per year. The "Lava" name is in reference to the Hawaiian Island that the Ironman Championship is held on each year.

The magazine was started under former World Triathlon Corporation CEO Ben Fertic. Under CEO Andrew Messick, WTC sought to focus solely on the Ironman brand of races and move away from publishing. In May 2012, WTC sold LAVA to a group of investors that included LAVA publisher John Duke, Active.com's CEO Dave Alberga and president Matt Landa, as well as former hedge fund manager Matthew Michelsen. Additionally, as part of the sale, Heather Gordon became the new publisher. The sale also coincided with the end of a two-year ban that prevented LAVA from being sold on the newsstand for two years. That ban was the result of a dispute and settlement between Duke's previous employer Triathlete Magazine, its parent Competitor Group, Inc., and WTC. After the sale LAVA will receive a preferred relationship with WTC as the official publication of Ironman, which will grant the magazine unique access to Ironman consumers.

=== Ironman Access ===
On October 27, 2010, World Triathlon Corporation put out a press release announcing the creation of an athlete membership program called Ironman Access. This program was to offer advanced registration to its Ironman events before entries would be open for registration to the general public. Advance race registration for members of Ironman Access would be open one week prior to the event's general entry registration date. Members of this program would also receive a number of other benefits, such as a free subscription to its LAVA magazine and discounts at its shopironman.com website. The cost of membership into the Ironman Access program was US$1,000. However, a day later, in response to comments the WTC received via email and from comments received through Facebook, Ben Fertic, then CEO of WTC, appeared in an online video announcing that Ironman Access program would be rescinded, stating: "If you guys think we're wrong, we're wrong." As explained in the video by Fertic, the purpose of the program was to free up 2,500 to 3,000 entry slots that go unused by individuals who sign up for multiple Ironman events.

== See also ==
- Competitor Group, Inc.
- Life Time Tri Series
