= FIS World Cup =

FIS (International Ski Federation) World Cup may refer to:

- FIS Alpine Ski World Cup, annual circuit of international alpine skiing competitions
- FIS Cross-Country World Cup, annual circuit of international cross-country skiing competitions
- FIS Freestyle Skiing World Cup, annual international freestyle skiing competition circuit
- FIS Nordic Combined World Cup, annual international Nordic combined competition circuit
- FIS Ski Jumping World Cup, annual international ski jumping competition circuit
- FIS Ski Flying World Cup, annual ski flying competitions, part of the FIS Ski Jumping World Cup
- FIS Snowboard World Cup, annual international snowboarding competition circuit
- FIS Speed Ski World Cup, annual speed skiing competitions
- FIS Telemark World Cup, annual Telemark racing competitions
- FIS Grass Skiing World Cup, annual grass skiing competitions
