= Rock 'n' Roll Running Series =

'Rock N Roll Marathon' events

The Rock 'n' Roll Running Series is a collection of road running events owned and operated by the IRONMAN Group's Competitor Group, part of Advance Publications. The series is known for lining race routes with live bands, cheerleaders and themed water stations.

== Events ==
There are 11 events in the Rock 'n' Roll Series spanning 6 countries. In 2012, Competitor Group organized its first marathon outside North America when it acquired the organizing rights for the Madrid (Spain) Marathon.

=== Marathons and Half Marathons ===
2019 Liverpool Rock 'n' Roll Half Marathon finishers medal

- Rock 'n' Roll Arizona Half Marathon – Phoenix, Tempe, and Scottsdale, Arizona
- Rock 'n Roll Las Vegas Half Marathon, 10k and 5k – Las Vegas, Nevada
- Maratón de Rock 'n' Roll Madrid – Madrid, Spain
- Rock 'n' Roll Manila Marathon – Manila, Philippines
- Rock 'n' Roll Mexico City Half Marathon – Mexico City, Mexico
- Rock 'n Roll Quito Half Marathon - Quito, Ecuador
- Rock 'n' Roll Nashville Marathon and Half Marathon – Nashville, Tennessee
- Rock 'n' Roll San Diego Marathon and Half Marathon – San Diego, California
- Rock 'n' Roll San Jose Half Marathon – San Jose, California
- Rock 'n' Roll Santiago Half Marathon – Santiago, Chile
- Rock 'n' Roll Taipei Half Marathon - Taipei City, Chinese Taipei
- Rock 'n' Roll Washington, D.C. Half Marathon – Washington, D.C.

=== Past Events ===
- Rock 'n' Roll Atlantic City Half Marathon and 5k (2022) - Atlantic City, New Jersey
- Rock 'n' Roll Beijing Half Marathon (2019) – Beijing, China
- Rock 'n' Roll Brooklyn Half Marathon (2015-2017) – Brooklyn, New York
- Rock 'n' Roll Cancún Marathon (2019) – Cancún, Mexico
- Rock 'n' Roll Carlsbad 5000 (2008-2018) - Carlsbad, California
- Rock 'n' Roll Chicago Half Marathon (2009-2019) – Chicago, Illinois
- Rock 'n' Roll Chengdu Half Marathon (2017-2019) – Chengdu, China
- Rock 'n' Roll Chongqing Shapingba (2018) - Shapingba, Chongqing, China
- Rock 'n' Roll Cleveland Half Marathon (2013) – Cleveland, Ohio
- Rock 'n' Roll Clearwater Half Marathon (2023) – Clearwater, Florida
- Rock 'n' Roll Dallas Half Marathon (2010–2018) – Dallas, Texas
- Rock 'n' Roll Denver Marathon (2010–2019) – Denver, Colorado
- Rock 'n' Roll Dublin Half Marathon (2013-2019) – Dublin, Ireland
- Rock 'n' Roll Edinburgh Half Marathon (2012-2013) – Edinburgh, Scotland
- Rock 'n' Roll Estado de México (2021-2023) - Toluca, Mexico
- Rock 'n' Roll Guangzhou Huadu Half Marathon (2018-2019) – Guangzhou, China
- Rock 'n' Roll Lima Half Marathon (2019) – Lima, Peru
- Rock ‘n’ Roll Lisbon Marathon (2013-2019) – Lisbon, Portugal
- Rock 'n' Roll Liverpool Marathon and Half Marathon (2014-2021) – Liverpool, United Kingdom
- Rock 'n' Roll Los Angeles Half Marathon (2010-2018) – Los Angeles, California
- Rock 'n' Roll Luoping Half Marathon (2018) - Yunnan, China
- Rock 'n' Roll Medellín Half Marathon (2019, 2022) – Medellín, Colombia
- Rock 'n' Roll Mérida (2015-2018) – Mérida, Mexico
- Rock 'n' Roll Miami Beach Half Marathon (2011–2012) – Miami Beach, Florida
- Marathon Oasis de Montreal (2012–2019) – Montreal, Canada
- Rock 'n' Roll New Orleans Marathon and Half Marathon (2010-2022) – New Orleans, Louisiana
- Rock 'n' Roll New Year's Eve (2011, cancelled before event) - Indian Wells/Palm Desert, California
- Rock 'n' Roll New York 10K (2011–2013) – New York, New York
- Rock 'n' Roll Nice 10 Miles du Carnaval (2014) - Nice, France
- Rock 'n' Roll Oaxaca Half Marathon (2018-2019) – Oaxaca, Mexico
- Rock 'n' Roll Oslo Half Marathon (2013-2014, cancelled before event) - Oslo, Norway
- Rock 'n' Roll Pasadena Half Marathon (2012–2013) - Pasadena, California
- Rock 'n' Roll Philadelphia Half Marathon (2010-2019) – Philadelphia, Pennsylvania
- Rock 'n' Roll Pittsburgh Half Marathon (2013, cancelled before event) – Pittsburgh, Pennsylvania
- Rock 'n' Roll Providence Half Marathon (2011–2013) – Providence, Rhode Island
- Rock 'n' Roll Portland Half Marathon (2012–2015) – Portland, Oregon
- Rock 'n' Roll Querétaro Marathon and Half Marathon (2015-2018) – Querétaro, Mexico
- Rock 'n' Roll Raleigh Marathon and Half Marathon (2014-2018) – Raleigh, North Carolina
- Rock 'n' Roll Salt Lake City Half Marathon (2023) – Salt Lake City, Utah
- Rock 'n' Roll San Antonio Marathon and Half Marathon (2008–2024) – San Antonio, Texas
- Rock 'n' Roll San Francisco Half Marathon (2013-2019) – San Francisco, California
- Rock 'n' Roll Savannah Marathon and Half Marathon (2011-2021) – Savannah, Georgia
- Rock 'n' Roll Seattle Marathon and Half Marathon (2009-2019, 2022) – Seattle, Washington
- Rock 'n' Roll Shanghai Chongming Half Marathon (2017) – Shanghai, China
- Rock 'n' Roll St. Louis Marathon and Half Marathon (2011-2017) – St. Louis, Missouri
- Rock 'n' Roll St. Petersburg Half Marathon (2012–2013) – St. Petersburg, Florida
- Rock 'n' Roll Vancouver Half Marathon (2014–2016) – Vancouver, Canada
- Rock 'n' Roll Virginia Beach Half Marathon (2001-2021) – Virginia Beach, Virginia

== Charity controversies ==
In 2008, the Competitor Group took over Elite Racing, the company that had been organizing the Rock 'n' Roll Marathon. The following year, 2009, an internal audit revealed that the charity in whose name the race had been run, Elite Racing Foundation for Children, Education & Medical Research, had been improperly commingling funds with the for-profit Elite Racing. It further found that the foundation was being operated "in many instances for the benefit of the for-profit,” and that the charity's role in hosting the races had been overstated. As a result, the race had benefited improperly from hundreds of thousands of dollars in public subsidies and grants. In announcing the results of the audit, Competitor said it would return $190,500 to San Diego County and $152,544 to the city of San Diego, spend the remaining foundation funds on health and wellness causes, file amended tax returns, and dissolve the foundation. Competitor Group made the final payments in October 2009. Altogether the company returned $344,176 to the city and county.

In September 2014 Saint Louis University School of Law professor Yvette Joy Liebesman sued Competitor Group, alleging a violation of the Fair Labor Standards Act in the handling of volunteers for the October 2012 race in St. Louis. The class-action lawsuit claims the company partners with charities to create a “a veneer for recruiting free labor” but the race events are for-profit and do not serve a charitable purpose under the law. The company asked the judge to dismiss the lawsuit, but this was denied, allowing the suit to go forward.
