= Greater Washington Sports Alliance =

The Greater Washington Sports Alliance (GWSA) is a non-profit organization which was founded in 2003 under the Greater Washington Board of Trade. It is an independent entity, and is the regional sports commission for the Greater Washington D.C. area.

The Sports Alliance's mission is four-fold: to attract marquee sporting events to the Greater Washington region, to connect the business community to the professional franchises, universities and local amateur teams in the region, to brand Greater Washington as a sports destination, and to support youth investment activities that use sports to build character and values, encourage fitness and enhance education.

The GWSA produces the Rock 'n' Roll Washington DC Marathon, held annually in Washington, D.C. It is also heavily involved in promoting other regional sporting events including Tiger Woods' AT&T National golf tournament, the Capitol Hill Volleyball Classic, the FLW Outdoor Bass Fishing Tournament, and America's Polo Cup. The GWSA also helped promote the 2007 WNBA All-Star Game, the Legg Mason Tennis Classic, and the MLS Cup held at RFK Stadium in 2007.

The GWSA hosted the Frozen Four portion of the 2009 NCAA Men's Division I Ice Hockey Tournament which was held at the Verizon Center on April 9 and 11th.

== See also ==
- Sports in Washington, D.C.
