= Competitor Group =

American sports marketing and management company

Competitor Group, Inc
- Type: Privately held company
- Industry: Sports marketing and Event management
- Founded: 2007
- Headquarters: Mira Mesa, San Diego, California
- Key people: Josh Furlow (CEO)
- Products: Rock 'n' Roll Marathon Series, Competitor magazine
- Owner: Advance Publications
- Parent: Ironman Group
- Website: www.competitorgroup.com

Competitor Group, Inc. (CGI) is a privately held, for-profit, sports marketing and management company based in Mira Mesa, San Diego, California. The company owns and operates over 40 large scale running, cycling, and triathlon events; of which includes the Rock 'n' Roll Running Series.

== History ==
Competitor Group was formed by Falconhead Capital at the end of 2007 when the firm acquired Elite Racing, an operator of running events in the United States, as well as La Jolla Holding Group, LLC (Triathlete magazine) and Competitor Publishing. In 2008, Falconhead Capital acquired Inside Communications, Inc., owners of VeloNews, Inside Triathlon, adding them to the CGI business portfolio.

With the acquisition of Elite Racing, CGI rapidly expanded its event production with the Rock 'n' Roll Marathon Series. In addition to the races already produced under Elite Racing, CGI has purchased under-performing marathon and half-marathon races as well as starting new races around the United States, sometimes receiving large tax breaks in the process.

In January 2014, Competitor Group announced that it would cease publication of Inside Triathlon. Originally called Triathlon Today, the magazine was first owned by Inside Communication in 1993, a competitor to La Jolla Holding Group's Triathlete magazine. With both magazine now under one ownership the emphasis of CGI was placed on Triathlete. Later, in July 2014, CGI announced their desire to focus on the running portion of their product portfolio. As a result, they were exploring opportunities to sell their Velo, VeloPress and TriRock brands, but planned to retain Triathlete magazine.

CGI was bought by a private equity firm, Calera Capital in 2012 and then sold to the Chinese conglomerate Wanda Group in 2017; which owned the World Triathlon Corporation (WTC), operators of the Ironman Triathlon brand. With the acquisition, CGI was placed under the sphere of WTC's Ironman Group. In October 2017, WTC subsequently sold CGI publications Triathlete, VeloNews and Women's Running to the Pocket Outdoor Media division of Pocket Ventures (a company later renamed to Outside), which owned SpaceNews. At that same time its Competitor magazine ceased publication due to its failing viability. In early 2020, Wanda Group sold CGI, as part of its ownership of WTC, to the privately held Advance Publications.

== Events and products ==
=== Running ===
- Rock 'n' Roll Marathon Series
- Carlsbad 5000
- Muddy Buddy series
- NFL Run Series

=== Cycling ===
- Singletrack.com
- Veloswap – industry consumer show

=== Triathlon ===
- TriRock Series
- Endurance Live – industry consumer show

=== Other ===
- Race It: Online event registration platform

== See also ==
- World Triathlon Corporation
