= STPI - Creative Workshop & Gallery =

STPI
- Established: 2002
- Location: 41 Robertson Quay Singapore 238236
- Type: Art gallery and creative workshop
- Director: Emi Eu
- Public transit access: NE5 Clarke Quay; DT20 Fort Canning
- Website: www.stpi.com.sg

Singapore Tyler Print Institute, also known as STPI - Creative Workshop & Gallery, is a creative workshop and contemporary art gallery based in Singapore that specialises in artistic experimentation in the medium of print and paper. STPI was established on 10 April 2002 and located in a restored 19th century warehouse by the Singapore River at Robertson Quay.

The 4,000-square metre facility houses specialised printmaking presses and equipment, a paper mill, 400-square metre gallery, guest workshop, artist studio, artist apartments, staff offices and The Corner Shop.

STPI is part of the national Visual Arts Cluster, comprising the National Gallery Singapore and the Singapore Art Museum. To date, STPI has collaborated with over 90 artists from all over the world.

== History ==
On 9 March 2000, the Renaissance City Report, also known as the Renaissance City Plan (RCP), was accepted by the government and unveiled in parliament by Minister for Information and the Arts Lee Yock Suan. Founding director of the RCP Liu Thai Ker persuaded American master printmaker Kenneth E. Tyler’s workshop equipment and expertise into Singapore. Tyler’s presses and equipment were shipped from his New York studio to 41 Robertson Quay and a paper mill was installed.

On 10 April 2002, the Singapore Tyler Print Institute was officially opened by Singapore's Deputy Prime Minister and Minister for Defence, Tony Tan.

In 2017, on its 15th anniversary, Singapore Tyler Print Institute was rebranded from a print institute to a creative workshop, STPI - Creative Workshop & Gallery.

S.E.A. Focus is a showcase of contemporary art from Southeast Asia, an initiative led by STPI since its inaugural edition in 2019.

== Artist collaborations ==
Visiting artists live in the guest apartments at STPI, with access to the artist’s studio and workshop. They are also invited to give public talks to introduce their practice and studio work, and share their collaboration experience. At the end of each collaboration, works produced are exhibited and catalogued.

- Aaron Curry (2018)
- Adeline Kueh (2021)
- Agus Swage (2009)
- Ahmad Zakii Anwar (2005)
- Alfredo and Isabel Aquilizan (2017, 2022)
- Amanda Heng (2017, 2021)
- Anri Sala (2017, 2020)
- Ashley Bickerton (2006, 2014, 2016, 2020)
- Atul Dodiya (2006)
- BenCab (2006, 2011)
- Brent Harris (2005)
- Carsten Holler (2017)
- Chang Fee Ming (2009)
- Charles Lim Yi Yong (2021)
- Christine Ay Tjoe (2006, 2009)
- Chua Ek Kay (2007, 2010)
- Chun Kwang-Yong (2006, 2009)
- David Chan (2009)
- Dinh Q. Lê (2018, 2020)
- Do Ho Suh (2015, 2016, 2022)
- Donald Sultan (2004)
- Donna Ong (2009)
- Eko Nugroho (2013, 2016, 2020, 2021)
- Entang Wiharso (2015, 2020, 2021)
- Eric Chan (2007)
- Genevieve Chua (2011, 2020, 2021, 2022)
- Geraldine Javier (2012)
- Ghada Amer (2008, 2021)
- Goh Beng Kwan (2007, 2020, 2022)
- Haegue Yang (2013, 2016, 2021)
- Han Sai Por (2014, 2016, 2022)
- Handiwirman Saputra (2012, 2016, 2021, 2022)
- Hema Upadhyay (2008, 2014,2020, 2021)
- Heman Chong (2007, 2014, 2021)
- Heri Dono (2016, 2020, 2021)
- Hong Zhu An (2012, 2014, 2020, 2022)
- Ian Woo (2021)
- Inga Svala Thorsdottir (2014, 2016, 2020)
- Jane Lee (2016, 2021)
- Jason Lim (2021)
- Jason Martin (2015, 2019, 2020)
- Jimmy Ong (2010)
- Jorinde Voigt (2015)
- Jumaldi Alfi (2011, 2021)
- Kim Beom (2017, 2021)
- Kim Lim (2020)
- Lieko Shiga (2007)
- Lin Tian Miao (2007, 2014, 2021)
- Lyra Garcellano (2011)
- Manuel Ocampo (2019, 2020, 2021)
- Melati Suryodarmo (2019, 2021, 2022)
- Nataraj Sharma (2007)
- Natee Utarit (2007)
- Ong Kim Seng (2004)
- Pacita Abad (2003)
- Pae White (2021)
- Phunk Studio (2009)
- Pinaree Sanpitak (2019, 2020, 2021)
- Prabhavathi Meppayil (2021)
- Qiu Zhijie (2008, 2014, 2020)
- R.E. Hartanto (2011)
- Reza Farkhondeh (2008, 2021)
- Richard Deacon (2012, 2014, 2015, 2016, 2020)
- Rirkrit Tiravanija (2014, 2017, 2020, 2022)
- Ronald Ventura (2014, 2017, 2020, 2022)
- Russel Wong (2005, 2021)
- Ryan Gander (2015, 2016)
- Shambhavi Singh (2011, 2016, 2020, 2021)
- Shinro Ohtake (2016, 2020)
- Shirazeh Houshiary (2015, 2016, 2020, 2021)
- Soo Pieng (2019)
- Srihardi Soedarsono (2005, 2021)
- Sun Xinping (2006)
- Sun Xun (2014)
- Sunaryo Soetono (2008, 2021)
- Suzann Victor (2015, 2016, 2020, 2021)
- Tabaimo (2010)
- Takashi Murakami (2019)
- Teppei Kaneuji (2014, 2016, 2020, 2022)
- Teresita Fernandez (2011)
- Thukral & Tagra (2011, 2014, 2021)
- Tobias Rehberger (2017)
- Trenton Doyle Hancock (2010)
- Wilson Shieh (2009)
- Wu Shanzhuan (2014, 2016, 2020)
- Yim Ja-Hyuk (2007, 2022)
- Zhan Wang (2012)
- Zhu Wei (2005, 2014)
- Zul Mahmod (2021)

== Activities ==
STPI hosts exhibitions of works produced in the Creative Workshop and regularly participates in local and international art fairs. The gallery holds 6-8 exhibitions a year, following successive artist collaborations, artist talks, panel discussions, regular docent-led tours, film screenings, performances and coffee & conversations. STPI organises print and papermaking workshops, guided tours, and an annual open house.

The STPI Workshop comprises facilities such with industry-grade print presses and a paper mill, as well as a team of print and papermakers. Techniques offered include: lithography, screen print. intaglio, and relief print.

=== Annual special exhibitions ===
The annual special exhibition is a yearly segment that presents works from the Singapore Art Museum Collection that were previously under the ownership of Kenneth E. Tyler, as well as various private collections and artist estates.

- Handmade Readymades: Jasper Johns, Roy Lichtenstein, Robert Rauschenberg & James Rosenquist (From the Singapore Art Museum Collection) (2018)
- David Hockney: A Matter of Perspective (From the Singapore Art Museum Collection and a Private Collection, Singapore) (2017)
- Zao Wou-Ki: No Boundaries (From The Estate of Zao Wou-Ki) (2016)
- As We Never Imagined: 50 Years of Art Making (From the Singapore Art Museum Collection) (2015)
- Edo Pop: The Graphic Impact of Japanese Prints’ (From the Collection of Minneapolis Institute of Arts) (2014)
- The Mystery of Picasso’s Creative Process: The Art of Printmaking’ (From the Archives of Claude Picasso) (2013)
- STPI: 10 Years and Counting Celebrating the Art of Collaboration (2012)
- David Hockney: Through the Eyes of the Artist (From the Singapore Art Museum Collection) (2011)
- 200 Artworks 25 Years’ Editions for Parkett (From Parkett Publishers) (2010)
- Pulp Stories II: James Rosenquist & Frank Stella (From the Singapore Art Museum Collection) (2009)
- Henri Matisse: Works from 1917 - 1952’ (From the Estate of Jean Matisse) (2008)
- Pablo Picasso: The Vollard Suite (From a Private Collection, Paris, France) (2007)
- Haring Symbols and Icons (From the Estate of Keith Haring) (2006)
- The Enlightened Vision Robert Motherwell’s Prints in Singapore (From the Singapore Art Museum Collection and National Gallery of Australia) (2005)

=== Art fairs ===
Art fair participations include: S.E.A. Focus (Singapore), Art Stage Singapore (Singapore), Art Basel (Basel, Hong Kong and Miami Beach), The Armory Show (New York), FIAC Paris (Paris), Frieze Art Fair (London, Seoul), IFPDA Fine Art Print Fair (New York), Art Fair Philippines (Philippines), Korean International Art Fair (South Korea), Art Paris Art Fair (Paris), Print Basel (Basel), Pulse (New York) and SH Contemporary (Shanghai).

=== Biennales ===
Year	Biennale	Artist
2021	10th Asia Pacific Triennial of Contemporary Art	Genevieve Chua
2021	Asian Art Biennial	Genevieve Chua
2018	Le Locle Triennial of Contemporary Prints 2018	Alfredo and Isabel Aquilizan, Carsten Höller, Kim Beom, Dinh Q. Lê, Tobias Rehberger, Anri Sala, Tabaimo, Rirkrit Tiravanija, Suzann Victor, Haegue Yang
2017	Yokohama Triennale	Carsten Höller, Tobias Rehberger, Anri Sala, Rirkrit Tiravanija
2016	3rd Shenzhen Independent Animation Biennale	Sun Xun
2015	Holland Animation Film Festival	Sun Xun
2015	Asian Art Biennale, Taichung, Taiwan	Sun Xun
2015	Venice Biennale	Carsten Höller

== See also ==
- National Heritage Board (Singapore)
