= Tal R =

Danish artist

Tal Rosenzweig (Hebrew: טל רוזנצוויג; born 1967), known as Tal R, is a Danish artist based in Copenhagen.

== Life and work ==
Tal R was born in Israel and moved to Denmark with his family when he was one year old. He studied at Billedskolen, Copenhagen, from 1986 to 1988 and at the Royal Danish Academy of Fine Arts from 1994 to 2000.

Tal R's painting style is described as kolboynik, which means "left-overs", a Hebrew word for "jack-of-all-trades."

He has shown work in exhibitions including Bicycle Thieves at Beret International Gallery in Chicago, House of Prince at Douglas Hyde Gallery in Dublin, The Gallery Show at the Royal Academy of Art in London and Ars Fennica at Henna and Pertti Niemisto Art Foundation in Helsinki. A LUX magazine article by Lisa Schiff featured him as one of the art world's six "hottest living artists" that would be expected to garner more recognition in the future.

Tal R currently teaches at the Kunstakademie Düsseldorf.

== 2019 legal action ==
In 2019, two Faroese artists bought one of Tal R's paintings, Paris Chic, and announced plans to cut it up and use pieces of the canvas as decorative faces for a line of luxury wristwatches. Tal R launched a successful action at the Maritime and Commercial Court of Denmark to stop the artists from destroying the work.
