= Genevieve Chua =

Singaporean painter (born 1984)

Genevieve Chua (Chinese: 蔡艾芳; born 1984, in Singapore) is a painter who works primarily through abstraction. Chua employs a method of working that unfurls and reveals the painter's process through diagram, palimpsest, syntax, and the glitch. While notions of nature and wilderness persist across several works, the form taken by her exhibitions – image, text or object – is mediated through painting.

Chua studied at Royal College of Art in London, where she graduated in 2018.

== Residencies ==
Chua has participated in numerous residences locally and abroad. In 2011, she was selected for the BMW Young Asian Artist Series III at STPI - Creative Workshop & Gallery and the Late Fall Residency at The Banff Centre. She was also a resident at the GCC Creative Residency Programme at the Gyeonggi Creation Centre in Gyeonggi-do, South Korea and The Art Incubator at the Centre for Creative Communications in Shizuoka, Japan.

== Solo exhibitions ==
- Closed during Opening Hours, Earl Lu Gallery ICA, Singapore (2019)
- 7½, Vestigials and Halves (2017)
- Silverlens Galleries, Rehearsals for the Wilful (2016)
- Gallery EXIT, Moths (2015)
- Tomio Koyama Gallery, Parabola (2014)
- GUSFORD, Cicadas Cicadas (2014)
- Valentine Willie Fine Art Singapore, Birthing Ground not A Sound (2012)
- Objectifs, Child And The Beast (2011)
- National Museum of Singapore, Full Moon and Foxes (2009)
- As Brutal As, La Libreria, Singapore (2007)

== Awards and Mentions ==
Chua was awarded the Young Artist Award by the National Arts Council in 2012. Chua was shortlisted for the 2015 Prudential Eye Awards for Contemporary Asian Art in Drawing.

Chua's work was exhibited at PULSE Miami in 2014 where Art F City listed it as a favorite installation, and art advisor Lisa Schiff chose Chua as one of The Top Nine Trending Artists Under 40 in Miami.

== Works ==
=== Adinandra Belukar (2011) ===
A work commissioned by the Singapore Biennale, the installation consists of 2 videos and graphite drawings on black walls. All walls are a wash of matt-black, and on them are graphite drawings of "bursts". Closest to the entrance is a video of a tree that revolves continuously, on loop. There are two entrances to the installation leads to a long narrow corridor in cul-de-sac fashion. At the dead-end of the corridor is the second video on a plasma screen. It features flora that is luminous in the dark. The installation is illuminated by 3 sources of light, sunlight from the door-less entrance; the overhead projection from the video; and the flicker emitted from the plasma screen.

=== After the Flood (2010) ===
The series highlights weeds and vines that rain down on existing vegetation and form carpets from tree to tree. These scenes are found at the margins of Adinandra Belukar (secondary forest) found in Singapore. When grown in a small pot, some of these weeds will not grow anymore than a few feet and will live for years and years. However, in an expanse of space, it sprawls rapidly and can grow up to about a foot a day, smothering anything in its path. With its dense tangle of hairy stems and large leaves, it suffocates other vegetation of their sunlight. Depending on tastes, an establishment of these weeds may be regarded as a pest or something of a beautiful sight. The series exists as hand-painted photographs in diptychs and triptychs. In 2011, the triptych After the Flood #18, #19, #20 was sold at Sotheby's Modern and Contemporary Southeast Asian Paintings in Hong Kong.
