= GUSFORD =

Coordinates: 34°05′00″N 118°20′36″W

GUSFORD is a contemporary art gallery located in Los Angeles, California, US. The gallery represents emerging and mid-career artists, both local and international.

== History ==
GUSFORD was founded in 2012 by artist and long-time collector Kelsey Lee Offield, and is dedicated to developing and nurturing emerging artists. The gallery program is built solely of solo artist presentations, where artists create and exhibit an entire body of work. GUSFORD opened in 2013 in the Los Angeles neighborhood of Hollywood with an exhibition featuring the work of local artist Adam Mars. GUSFORD debuted the first North American solo exhibition by Swiss artist Andrea Hasler in June 2013, and participated in PULSE Contemporary Art Fair 2014 in New York, where artist Hassan Hajjaj was awarded the 2014 PULSE Art Prize. In September 2014, GUSFORD will debut the first solo exhibition of young Birmingham artist Oliver Jones. GUSFORD is named after Offield's English bulldog.

== Represented Artists ==
- Michael Brunswick
- Dorielle Caimi
- Genevieve Chua
- Hassan Hajjaj
- Andrea Hasler
- Oliver Jones
- Adam Mars
- Hugh Mendes
- SuttonBeresCuller
- Dave White
- Aleah Chapin
