= San Jose Museum of Art =

Contemporary art museum in San Jose, California, U.S.

San José Museum of Art
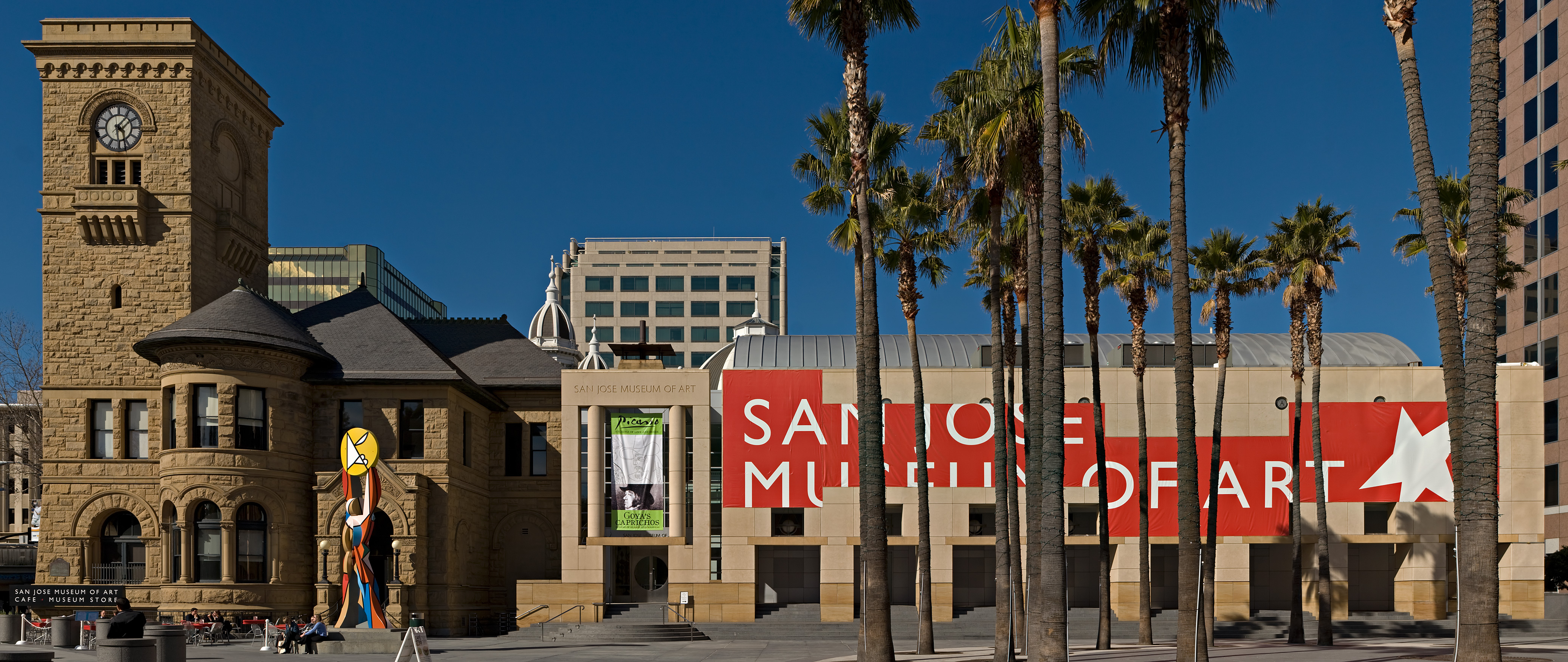
- San Jose Museum of Art in 2008

- Location within San Jose, California
- Established: 1969
- Location: 110 South Market Street, San Jose, California 95113; United States
- Type: Art museum
- Accreditation: American Association of Museums
- Collections: contemporary and modern art
- Collection size: 2,600 (2019)
- Director: Susan Sayre Batton
- Curator: Lauren Schell Dickens
- Architect: Skidmore, Owings and Merrill (1991 addition)
- Public transit access: Santa Clara station (VTA); San Jose Diridon station
- Website: sjmusart.org
- Civic Art Gallery
- U.S. National Register of Historic Places
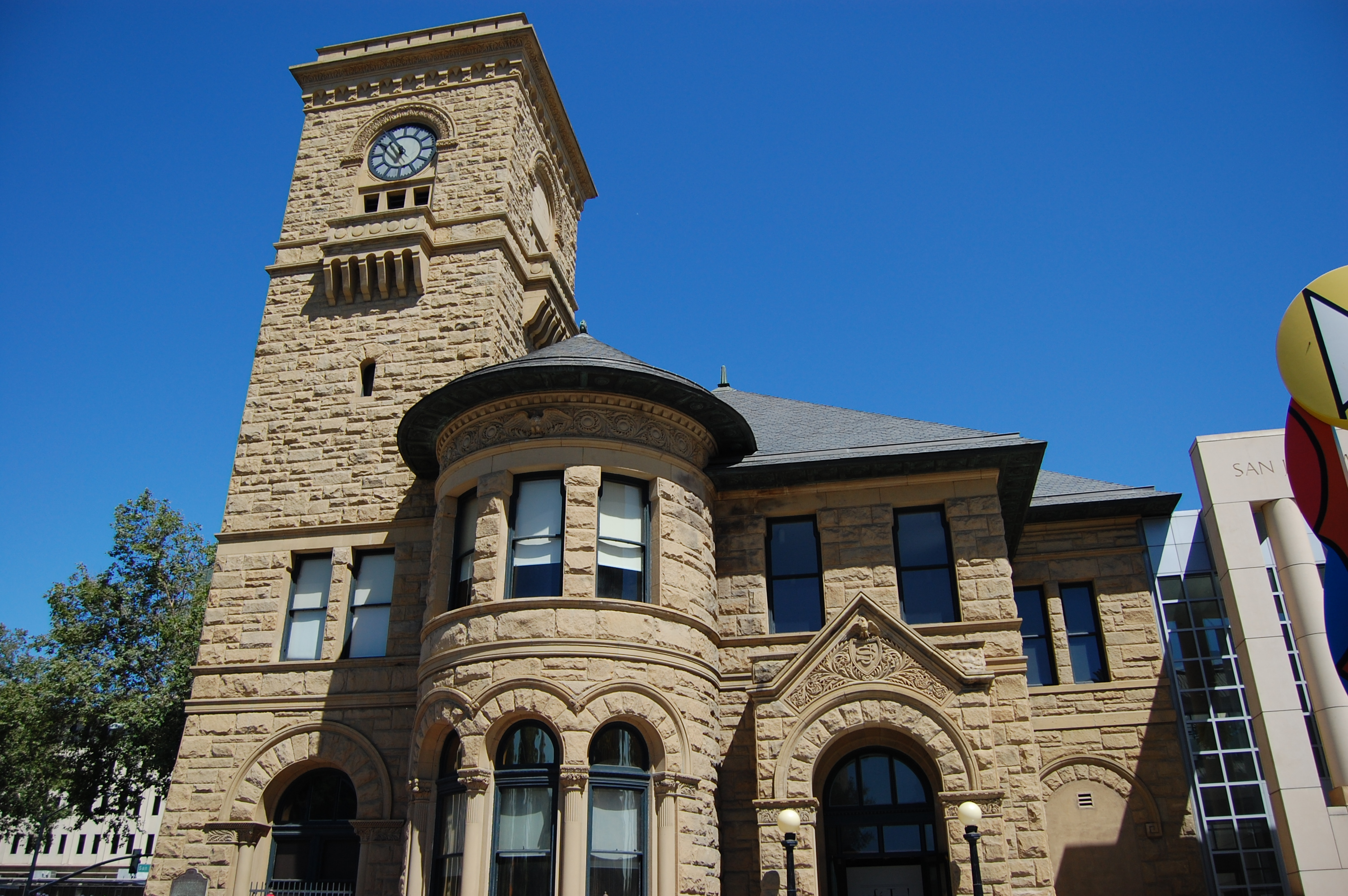
- Location: San Jose, California
- Coordinates: 37°20′01″N 121°53′21″W
- Built: 1892
- Architect: Willoughby J. Edbrooke
- Architectural style: Richardsonian Romanesque
- NRHP reference No.: 73000453
- Added to NRHP: January 29, 1973; 53 years ago

The San Jose Museum of Art (SJMA) is a modern and contemporary art museum in downtown San Jose, California, United States. Founded in 1969, the museum holds a permanent collection with an emphasis on West Coast artists of the 20th and 21st centuries. It is located at Circle of Palms Plaza, beside Plaza de César Chávez. A member of North American Reciprocal Museums, SJMA has received several awards from the American Alliance of Museums.

== About ==
The San Jose Museum of Art is the largest provider of arts education in Santa Clara County, serving over 45,000 children per year. The permanent collection focuses on contemporary art by US West Coast artists, with a growing emphasis on art of the Pacific Rim. The collection includes more than 2,600 artworks in a variety of media including sculpture, paintings, prints, digital media, photographs, and drawings.

== History ==
Founded in 1969 by a group of artists, the art museum was first known as the Civic Art Gallery. Ann Marie Mix and Susan Hammer were co-founding trustees of the museum. The group sought to save a historic structure slated for demolition and to revitalize it as a community art gallery. The early arts organization was referred to as a "gallery" prior to the establishment of a permanent collection of artwork.

In 1974, it was renamed the San Jose Museum of Art.

The museum established a partnership with the Whitney Museum of American Art in 1994. Information about each exhibition was published for visitors in English, Spanish, Tagalog and Vietnamese, reflecting the diversity of patrons in San Jose in the 1990s.

By 1997, the museum had acquired a collection of approximately one thousand pieces of contemporary art, mostly works on paper.

Susan Krane, executive director from 2008 through January 2017, continued to grow the collection in size and stature. Krane was succeeded by Susan Sayre Batton as executive director in April 2017. By 2019, after 50 years of operation, the SJMA had acquired a permanent collection with 2,600 objects.

== Architecture ==
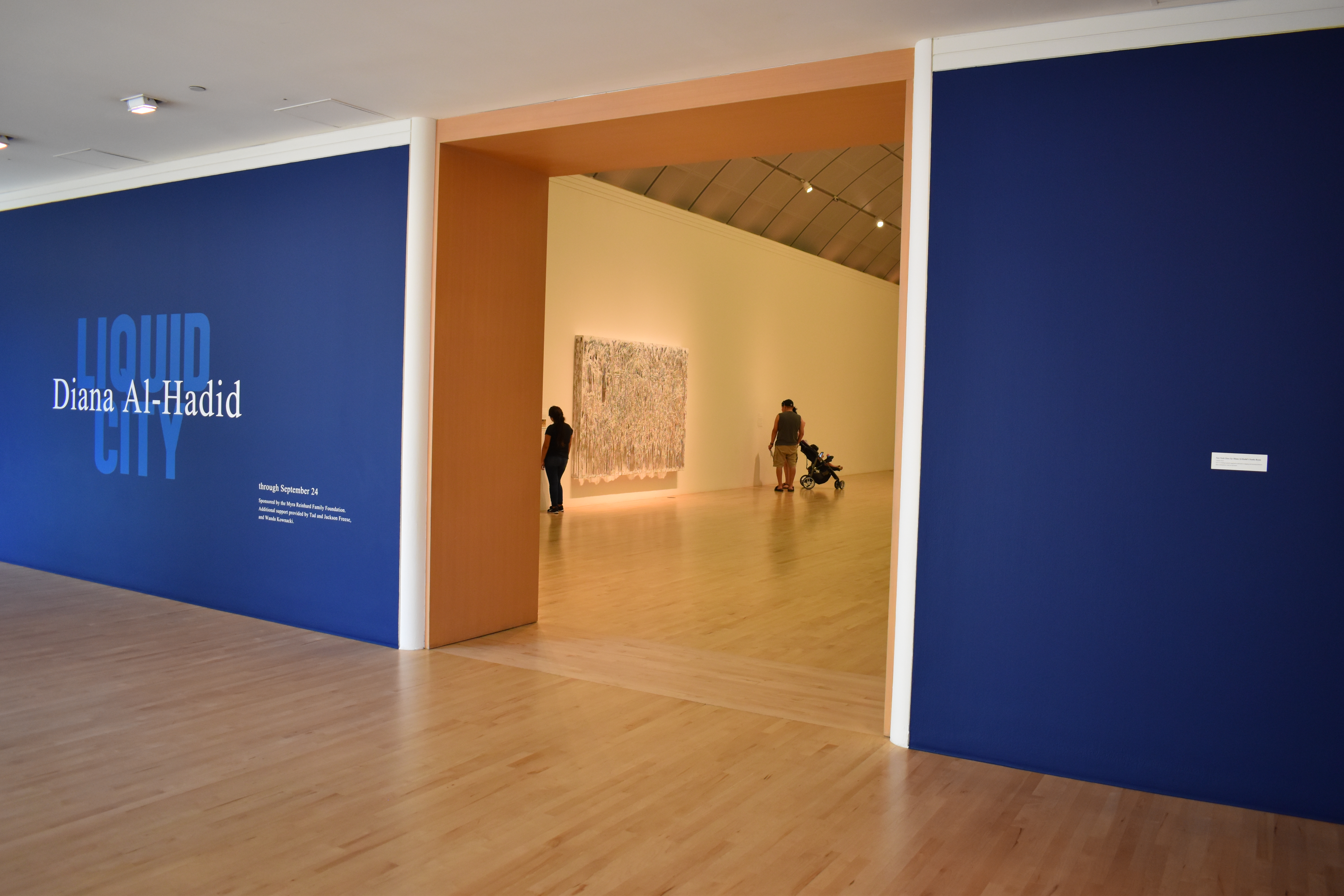
San Jose Museum of Art in 2017

The museum's 33,000-square-foot historic wing was originally designed by federal architect Willoughby J. Edbrooke. Built from local Greystone Quarry sandstone in 1892, the structure was designed to serve as the main post office for the city of San Jose. It is an example of the Richardsonian Romanesque architecture style. The original steeple and clock tower were damaged in the 1906 earthquake. From 1937 to 1969 the historic wing served as the city of San Jose's library. The building was then converted by the Fine Arts Gallery Association, a group of community members and San Jose State University art professors, who then reopened it as the Civic Art Gallery. In 1972 the building was named a California Historical Landmark (#854), and in 1973 it was added to the National Register of Historic Places.

A 45,000-square-foot modern addition known as the "New Wing", designed by architects Skidmore, Owings and Merrill to house the majority of the exhibition space, was opened to the public in 1991. Robinson, Mills & Williams oversaw the interior design of the new addition.

The San Jose Museum of Art underwent a major seismic retrofitting in the late 1990s, at which time the building interiors were further modified and reintegrated to serve as a contemporary art gallery and exhibition space. In 1997, the museum reopened after the historic wing of the building had undergone a remodel for two and half years.

== Collections ==
Artwork by Hung Liu in the permanent collection at SJMA

The San Jose Museum of Art's permanent collection has grown over the years to include 2,600 art objects as of 2019.

Artforum reported that senior curator Lauren Schell Dickens oversaw the acquisition of works by California-born live simulation artist Ian Cheng and German moving image artist Hito Steyerl in the late 2010s.

The San Jose Museum of Art has several works in its collection by the painter Hung Liu, a Chinese-born contemporary artist and professor of art at Oakland's Mills College.

The museum added a number of works to their collection in 2016 from artists: Robert Arneson, Squeak Carnwath, Enrique Chagoya, Luis Cruz Azaceta, Lesley Dill, George Grosz, George Herms, Italo Scanga, and Fritz Scholder.

In 2018, the SJMA acquired new works for the permanent collection: from sculptors Louise Nevelson and Alexander Calder, from the American artists Andrea Bowers, Russell Crotty, Morris Graves, Lara Schnitger, and Terry Winters, as well as from the Palestinian artist Mona Hatoum.

== Exhibitions ==
The San Jose Museum of Art held major exhibitions for artists Leo Villareal in 2010, and Richard Misrach, Guillermo Galindo, and Tabaimo in 2016, under the tenure of Susan Krane.

In 2018, the museum presented a large scale solo exhibition of Vietnamese photographer Dinh Q. Lê. Later that year, SJMA held Other Walks, Other Lines, an exhibition of international artists "who examine not only where we walk, but how and why" that included artwork from the Dutch artist Lara Schnitger and a work commissioned by the museum from Philippine artist Lordy Rodriguez.

The Art Newspaper reported that the San Jose Museum of Art framed 2019 as "the year of visionary women artists” that featured shows by Jay DeFeo and Catherine Wagner, along with major exhibitions by artists Rina Banerjee and Pae White.

== Awards ==
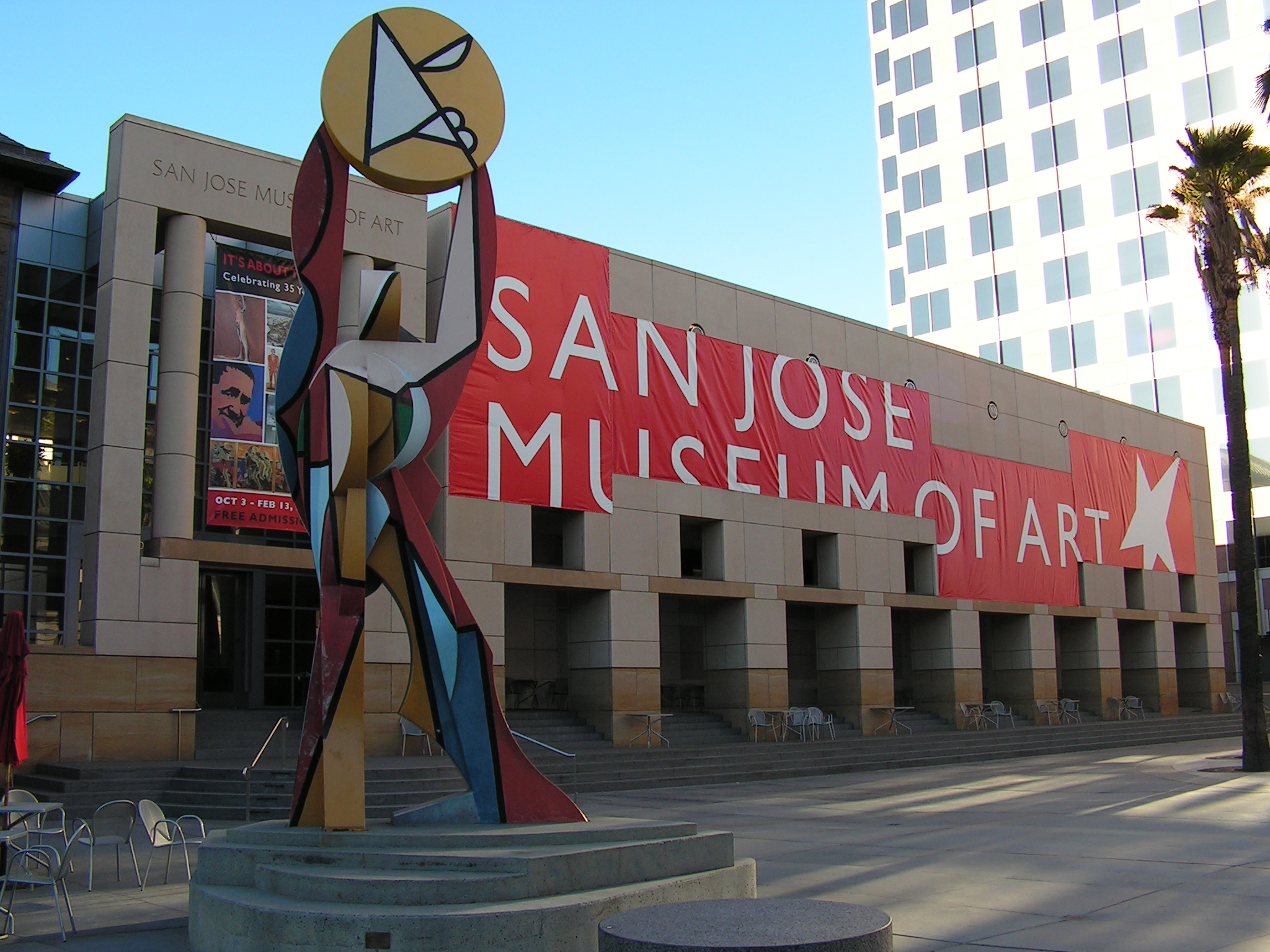
The "New Wing" section of the museum

In 2007 the San Jose Museum of Art received the prestigious MUSE award from the Media & Technology Committee of the American Alliance of Museums, for its Artist of the Week podcast, in the category Extended Experience.

In 2009, the museum received another MUSE award, in Public Relations and Development, for its video, Road Trip, informally known as the "Giant Artichoke video". The work features a platform-shod traveler on a road trip to Castroville, California, who visits a quirky landmark and sends a postcard to SJMA. Created for the exhibition of the same name and inspired by the common experience of a summer road trip, this project aimed to promote the exhibition, sow the seeds for a participatory experience both outside and inside the museum, and build connections between the museum's online audience and on-site visitors.

In 2017, the museum received the Superintendent's Award for Excellence in Museum Education for the Sowing Creativity education program from the California Association of Museums.

The same year, the museum received the first prize in the Exhibition Collateral Materials category of the American Alliance of Museum’s Museum Publications Design Competition for Tabaimo: Her Room by Connie Hwang.

In 2018, SJMA received the Vietnamese American Cultural Center Award for work in the community. The same year, it received a Cornerstone of the Arts Award from the City of San Jose for the mural Sophie Holding the World Together by El Mac in collaboration with The Propeller Group. The mural, which depicts youth immigration activist Sophie Cruz, was commissioned by the San Jose Museum of Art in partnership with Empire 7 Studios and the Children's Discovery Museum of San Jose.

== See also ==
- The Tech Museum of Innovation
- Children's Discovery Museum of San Jose
- Movimiento de Arte y Cultura Latino Americana (MACLA)
- San Jose Institute of Contemporary Art (ICA)
