= Oliver C Jones =

- Born: 1985 (age 40–41); Shropshire
- Education: Birmingham Institute of Art and Design (First Class Honours Degree in Fine Art)
- Notable work: Love the Skin You’re In, Divine
- Style: His large-scale, photo-realistic pastel works of art aim to question society's notion of flesh
- Website: http://www.olivercjones.com/

Oliver C Jones (born 1985 in Shropshire, UK) is a contemporary British artist known for his large-scale photorealist chalk pastel drawings. His work is most fundamentally concerned with flesh, in particular how its image exists and how it is interpreted in society.

Jones graduated in 2008 from the Birmingham Institute of Art and Design with First-Class Honors. Shortly after graduation, Jones was the winner of the Best of UK competition at SaLon Gallery, London, earning a place in the UK's Future Greats show. In 2010, Jones was shortlisted for the Threadneedle Prize for Painting and Sculpture for his work Georgina, which featured 'an optical illusion in which a girl's face was upside-down and the eyes and mouth were flipped up the right way.' His work was also featured in the BBC2 show Show Me the Monet. Jones was shortlisted for the Young Masters Art Prize 2014 and awarded a Highly Commended Prize.

In his debut 2014 solo exhibition Love the Skin You're In, Jones 'explored society's obsession with perfect skin' and the exhibition included a portrait of his young daughter with plastic surgery marks covering her face titled Designer Baby.

Jones is the Co-Founder of A3 Project Space Digbeth, Birmingham, UK which supports contemporary artists and hosts residencies in collaboration with mac birmingham and Turning Point West Midlands.

Jones is represented by Los Angeles-based gallery GUSFORD.
