= Jackson Tan =

Singaporean artist

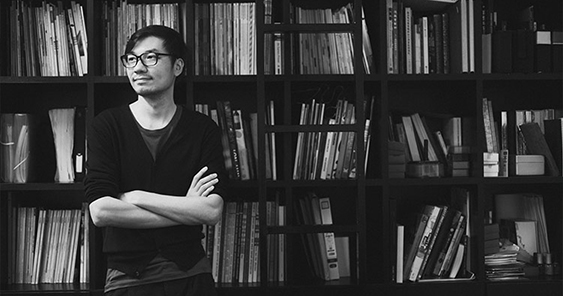
- Education: Goldsmiths, University of London / LASALLE College of the Arts
- Occupations: Artist, designer and curator

Jackson Tan (born in 1974) is a Singaporean artist curator, and designer. He is one of the founding partners of contemporary art and designs collective PHUNK, the creative director of the multidisciplinary creative studio BLACK and the creator of Art-Zoo. In 2011, Tan was named one of Time Out’s 50 Movers and Shakers of Singapore’s Art Scene. He was appointed to The Straits Times’ Life Power List in 2015 '.

== Education ==
Tan graduated in 1994 with a Diploma in Visual Communications (Graphic Design) from LASALLE College of the Arts. In 2015, he earned a Master in Fine Art from Goldsmiths, University of London / LASALLE College of the Arts.

== Career ==
=== PHUNK ===
Tan met the founding members of PHUNK while they were studying at LASALLE College of the Arts. Upon their graduation in 1994, they formed the art and design collective together. They have since presented and collaborated with brands and organizations around the world, such as Nike, MTV, HBO, and The Rolling Stones. In 2007, they were conferred the Designer of the Year Award at the President’s Design Award in Singapore.

=== BLACK ===
Projects by the studio include SG50, a branding initiative celebrating Singapore’s 50th birthday; Violet Oon Singapore, a chain of Peranakan restaurants; CREATIVE©ITIES, an exploration of multimedia work from 10 cities in the Asia Pacific region; and KYO Project, a reinterpretation of Japanese craft forms through collaborations with Singaporean designers.

=== Methodology ===
In 2013, Tan founded Methodology with Brian Ling. Collaborating with industry leaders across the disciplines of design, craft, and innovation, they develop educational programmes, workshops, and conferences. Past speakers include Fumi Sasada, president and CEO of Bravis International; Danish designer, academic, and author Per Mollerup; and co-founder of 5W Infographics Juan Velasco.

=== Art-Zoo ===
In 2016, Tan created Art-Zoo, a universe of imaginative landscapes and characters inspired by “childhood memories of visiting and drawing the animals at the Singapore Zoo and the animal-themed playgrounds”. A travelling inflatable art park comprising these characters and landscapes was launched in 2017. An accompanying series of reading and activity books have also been produced.

=== Professional affiliations ===
Tan has served on the board of various institutions in Singapore, including The Design Society as founding Vice President, the Steering Committee of the National Design Centre, and the Promote Mandarin Council. He continues to be a member of the International Academy of Digital Arts and Sciences and of the Board of Governors of Nanyang Polytechnic, where he is also the Chairman of the Advisory Committee for the School of Design.
