= Shambhavi Singh =

Indian painter and printmaker

- Born: 1967 (age 58–59); Patna, Bihar, India
- Education: College of Fine Arts and Crafts, Patna; Delhi College of Art
- Known for: Painting, printmaking, installation art
- Notable work: Bhoomi (2020)
- Movement: Contemporary art

Shambhavi Singh (born 1967) is a painter, printmaker, and installation artist currently based in New Delhi, India. Her artistic practice encompasses a diverse range of processes and media, but her work is predominantly non-figurative, focusing on the relationship between humans and nature, as well as the social and metaphysical conditions of the agricultural worker.

== Life and career ==
Born in Patna, the capital of the Indian state of Bihar, Singh has said that visiting her grandparents in the countryside sparked her interest in nature and influenced her artistic direction. Singh attended the College of Fine Arts and Crafts, Patna, in the 1980s, alongside her contemporary, Subodh Gupta. She moved to New Delhi in 1990, earning a Master's in Fine Arts from the Delhi College of Art, and she has continued to live and work in the capital for the majority of her two-decade career, despite frequent travel. In 1997, Singh traveled to the Netherlands to participate in a project at the Tropenmuseum in Amsterdam, where she began to take an interest in issues of migration and migrant labor. In 2000-2001, she was an artist-in-residence at Greatmore Studios, in Cape Town, South Africa, which she has said prompted a deeper engagement with the philosophy of Mahatma Gandhi, but also to an invitation to participate in Holland South Africa Line (HSAL), an international exchange project with Dutch artists held in the William Fehr Collection, in the Castle of Good Hope. In 2010, Singh was invited to be an artist-in-residence at STPI - Creative Workshop & Gallery in Singapore.

== Work ==
Despite her extensive international travel, Singh continues to ground her work in her upbringing in Bihar, which she said "nurtured and evolved [her] creative language." Singh has stated that her experiences abroad strengthened her interest in the relationship between nature and humanity – it was while traveling, for example, that she began to become aware of the history of migration, as well as the plight of migrant laborers. Although Singh, who has worked in paint, printmaking, sculpture, video installation, and other new media, uses largely non-figurative and non-narrative modes of expression, her work often references themes related to agriculture and rural labor. Singh's work has been exhibited in India, South Africa, Australia, New York, and the Netherlands, where she was associated with the Foundation of Indian Artists, Amsterdam. She is represented by Talwar Gallery, which has exhibited her work in New York and New Delhi. Recently, Singh's work was added to the collection of the Museum of Modern Art (MoMA) in New York. Additionally, Shambhavi's work was displayed in a solo exhibition named Bhoomi from January 25- February 24 in the year of 2020, in Gallery Escape, located in New Delhi, India. The exhibition Bhoomi explored themes of rural life, tools of agriculture, and the environmental and structural elements of the countryside, according to the gallery’s description.

== Residencies & Workshops ==
- 2010: STPI - Creative Workshop & Gallery
- 2001-2004: Greatmore Studios, Cape Town, South Africa, with participation in Holland South Africa Line (HSAL), at The Castle of Good Hope, William Fehr Collection
- 2002: KHOJ International Workshop, Mysore and Bangalore, India
- 1998-99: The search within, Art between Implosion and Explosion, Pernegg Monastery, Vienna
- 1997: Project on "Kali," Tropenmuseum, Amsterdam, the Netherlands
