= PHUNK =

Singapore-based art and design collective

- Origin: Singapore
- Years active: 1994 – present
- Members: Alvin Tan (artist); Melvin Chee; Jackson Tan; William Chan
- Website: www.phunkstudio.com

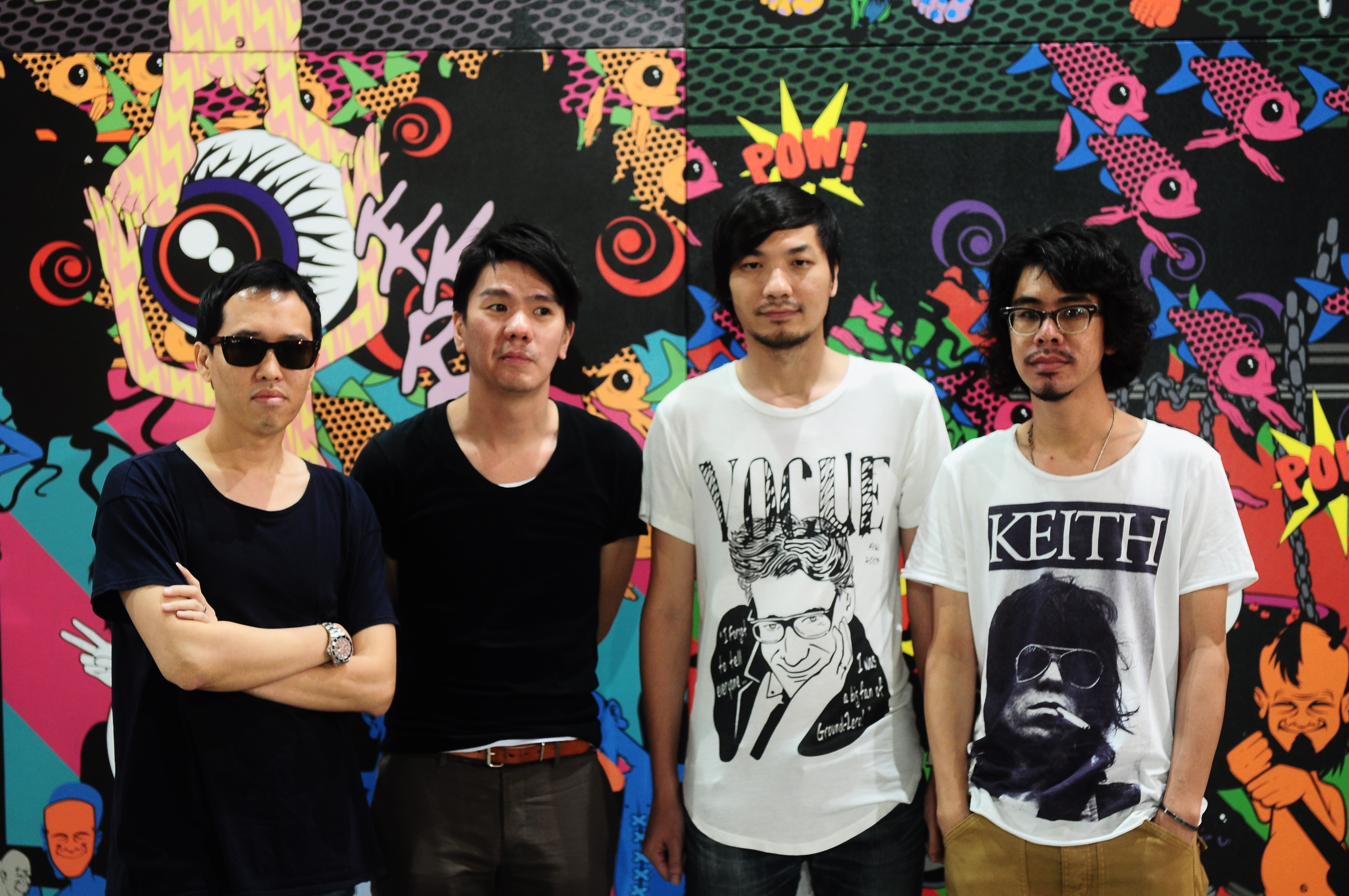
From left: William Chan, Melvin Chee, Jackson Tan, Alvin Tan

PHUNK (previously known as :phunk and Phunk Studio) is a Singapore-based contemporary art and design collective founded by Alvin Tan, Melvin Chee, Jackson Tan, and William Chan in 1994. They have exhibited and collaborated with artists, designers and fashion brands around the world, producing work across a diverse range of mediums.

PHUNK was awarded Gold and Silver medals by Promax Asia in six consecutive years between 2001 and 2006. In 2007, the collective was conferred the Designer of the Year Award at the President's Design Award in Singapore.

== Style ==
The work of PHUNK is greatly influenced by popular culture and its ever-evolving series of metaphors, codes and iconography. Having grown up in the '70s and '80s, its members are inspired by Hong Kong's kungfu movies and Cantonese TV series, Japanese anime and manga, American TV programmes, DC and Marvel comics, British indie pop, new wave and American rock music, as well as MTV. These continue to be part of a recurring theme that they express through their work.

Upon entering art college in the '90s, they began looking to various art and design movements such as the Bauhaus, Fluxus, Situationism, Pop Art, Swiss Modernist and Postmodernist design. This drove them to explore work that blurs the boundaries between fine art and commercial design. PHUNK is known for taking an experimental approach to their projects, combining various contexts and symbols to create a signature visual language and system. To date, they have produced across the fields of art, design, publishing, fashion, music, film and interactive art, exploring mediums ranging from silkscreen prints, mixed media pieces and sculptures to acrylic, wood, and vinyl figurines.

== History ==
=== 1992–1994: the early years ===
The members of PHUNK met as design students at LASALLE College of the Arts, where they studied Visual Communications. They had initially thought of starting a band while in college, but decided to found an art collective to further their shared interest in visual art.

=== 1995–1997: experimentation, Guerilla Fonts ===
Between 1995 and 1997, the artists served a two-year period of mandatory National Service with the Singapore Armed Forces. They spent their weekends creating visual works and experimenting with various modes of artistic expression.

Eventually, they began to produce visuals and graphics which they sent out to friends and family. This led to their founding of type foundry Guerilla Fonts, which saw them create original digital typeface designs. These typeface designs were later sent to Garage Fonts in Del Mar, California.

=== 1998–1999: Trigger Magazine, MTV Asia ===
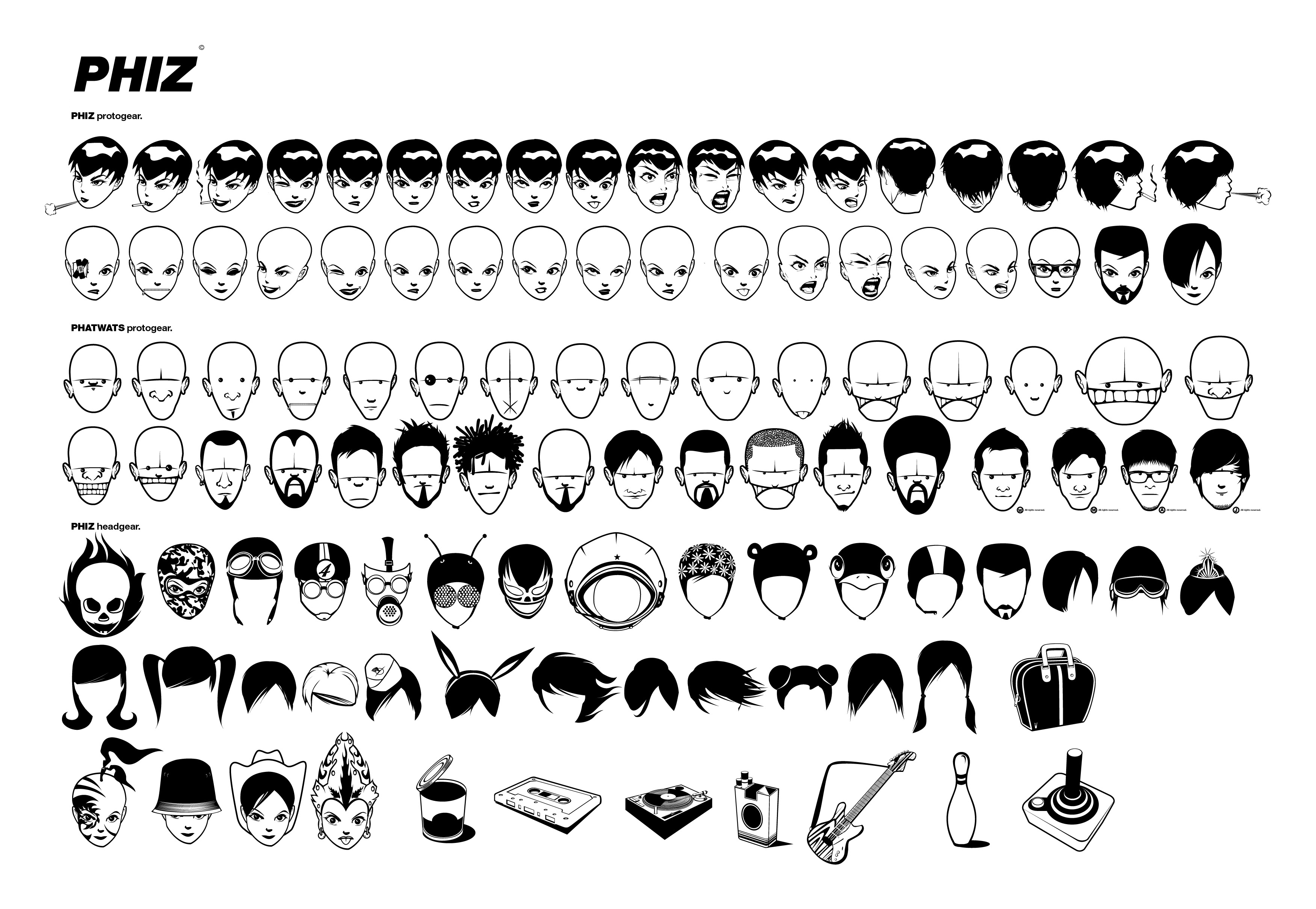
Phiz dingbats

In 1998, Garage Fonts began distributing Guerilla Fonts' typeface designs worldwide. PHUNK was invited to write the introduction to the book New Typographics 2, published by Japanese publishers PIE books. They subsequently founded Trigger Magazine, distributing 20,000 copies within a week. The launch of the magazine at Zouk further initiated a series of themed nights that the club became known for.

PHUNK started a long-standing working relationship with MTV Asia in 1999, while in the design sphere, their creation of Phiz dingbats, marked the start of the collective's unique illustration style.

=== Early 2000s: global recognition, publishing ===
The early 2000s saw PHUNK gain recognition regionally and globally. Their artwork featured in numerous group and solo exhibitions, including the retrospective showcase A Decade of Decadence, which was held at the Singapore History Museum to commemorate their 10th anniversary.

In 2004, they were selected to represent Singapore at the Place project, which opened at the Museu Valencia de la Il.lustració i La Modernitat, in València, Spain. The following year, PHUNK exhibited as part of the Gwangju Design Biennale, and subsequently presented at London Design Festival 2006 as part of 20/20 Singapore Design Movement.

The collective also furthered their foray into publishing with the launch of two books during this period: Transmission 02: Utopia and Mono Number One: Phunk Studio.

=== 2007–2008: solo exhibitions, President's Design Award, TRANSMISSION ===
In 2007, PHUNK was selected to exhibit at the Young Talents show in Art Cologne, where they were nominated for Best of Show. They launched several solo exhibitions, including Universality, which opened at the Museum of Contemporary Art Taipei; Universe, at Art Seasons in Singapore; and Universe II, at the Gallery J. Chen in Taipei.

PHUNK was also appointed as artists for the Circle Line Art Project by the Land Transport Authority. They began collaborating with Levi Strauss & Co. on a number of T-shirt series that were launched in Europe, Japan, and Asia Pacific, and presented a solo exhibition at the Levi's flagship store in Paris.

That same year, PHUNK was recognised for their work for MTV's Top 100 Hits show packaging, receiving the Certificate of Typographic Excellence at the 54th Type Directors Club's Type Design Awards. They were subsequently commissioned by MTV Asia to re-design their on-air channel. 2007 also saw PHUNK launch Universality, an art book published by Page One.

PHUNK made history when they were named Designer of the Year at the President's Design Award 2007, becoming the youngest recipient of the highest design accolade in Singapore.

In 2008, PHUNK was named as part of the inaugural design jury for the Cannes Lions. They were also invited to participate in STPI's artist-in-residence program, for the BMW Young Asian Artist Series. They launched TRANSMISSION, an experimental, multi-disciplinary laboratory that saw them mentor and share their experience, knowledge and skills with younger creators. Subsequent editions were held in 2010, 2012 and 2014.

Elsewhere, PHUNK was represented at New Wave – Singapore's Contemporary Design Culture, an exhibition hosted by the Center for Creative Communications in Shizuoka, Japan. They launched a solo exhibition at the Korea International Art Fair, and was named as one of 50 Local Heroes in Singapore by Time Out. A collaboration with Giordano on the World Without Strangers – Giordano Tee Project for Asia Pacific saw the collective expand further into the fashion industry.

=== 2009–2010: international collaborations, public art ===
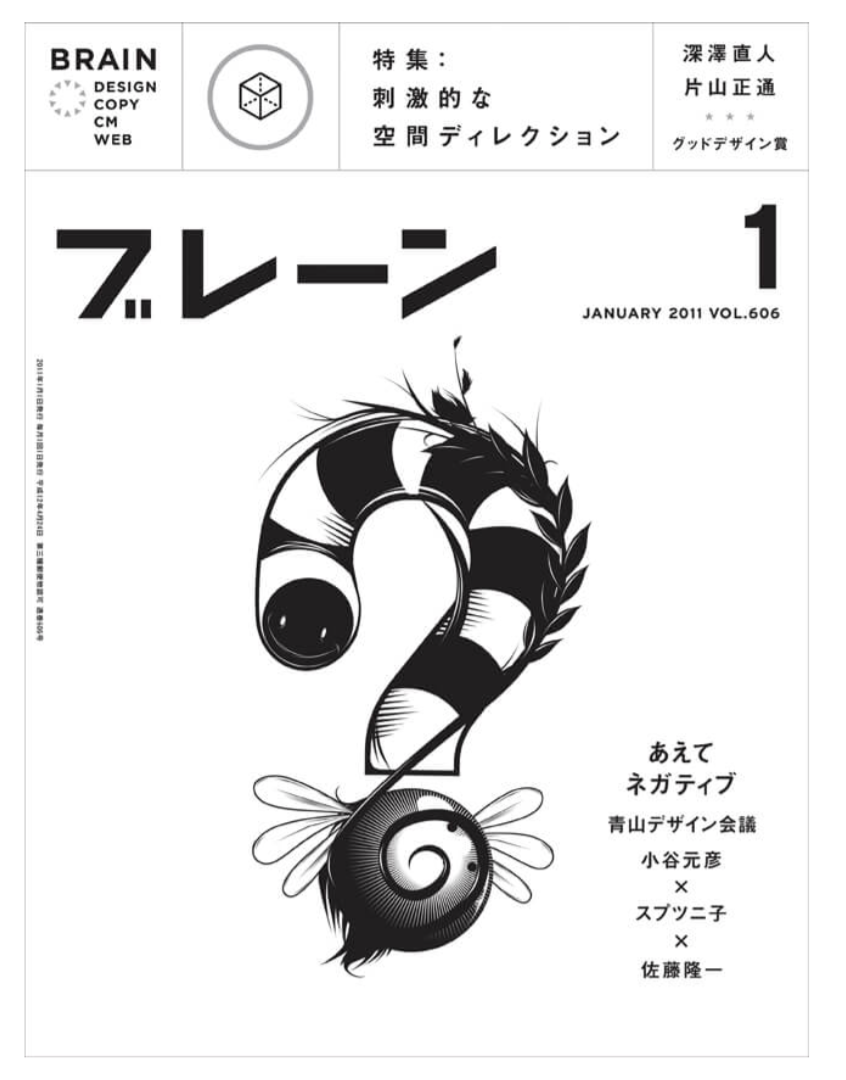
PHUNK's cover for Brain Magazine

In 2009, PHUNK exhibited Around the World / Across the Universe at Vallery in Barcelona. In May, their artwork was featured on the cover of Time Out Hong Kong, followed by Japan's Brain Magazine the next year. The collective also collaborated with G-Shock on a limited edition watch, and with Japanese pop artist Keiichi Tanaami on a series of artworks and exhibitions.

Soon after, PHUNK's New World art series became part of the campaign visuals for MTV World Stage. They worked with Nike SB to launch the brand in Tokyo, and put up the exhibition Welcome to Electricity at the city's Diesel Gallery. Elsewhere in Japan, they teamed with Uniqlo for the global launch of the retailer's line of graphic T-shirts, producing an artist edition for UT Collection.

Back in Singapore, PHUNK's site-specific public art installation Dreams in Social Cosmic Odyssey was launched at Promenade MRT station. They collaborated with Hermès for the exhibition P.S. I Silk You, creating a special installation featuring Mr Black. They also designed the guests rooms of the now-defunct Wanderlust Hotel in the Little India neighbourhood.

=== 2011–2012: PHUNK, The Rolling Stones ===
2011 ushered in a new era for the collective after a fire destroyed all of the work in their studio, following which they officially became known as PHUNK. They went on to launch a site-specific media pole installation in Seoul, and design a series of FRANK credit cards with OCBC Bank in Singapore.

Other notable achievements during the period include a collaboration with legendary rock band The Rolling Stones on a series of band merchandise, and presenting their solo exhibition Empire of Dreams at various venues around the world: Art Seasons in Singapore, Future Pass – From Asia to the World at the 54th Venice Biennale, the Wereldmuseum Rotterdam, the National Taiwan Museum of Fine Arts, Gallery J. Chen in Taipei, Singapore Show: Future Proof and Panorama: Recent Art from Contemporary Asia, both at the Singapore Art Museum.

=== 2013–present: global expansion, multimedia collaborations ===
In 2013, PHUNK launched a site-specific installation for Deutsche Bank in Singapore as part of OH! Open House Festival. They designed a series of rugs with luxury carpet makers Tai Ping, and were part of the exhibition Welcome to the Jungle at the Yokohama Museum of Art.

2014 saw the collective collaborate with HBO Asia on an art exhibition to launch the third season of TV series Game of Thrones in the region. To introduce the HTC One M8 globally, PHUNK worked with the electronics company to create a limited edition handset, and was a featured artist and designer for the main festival visual for the Fukuoka Art Triennale at the Fukuoka Asian Art Museum. They also put up the site-specific Art Toilet installation at Parco in Fukuoka.

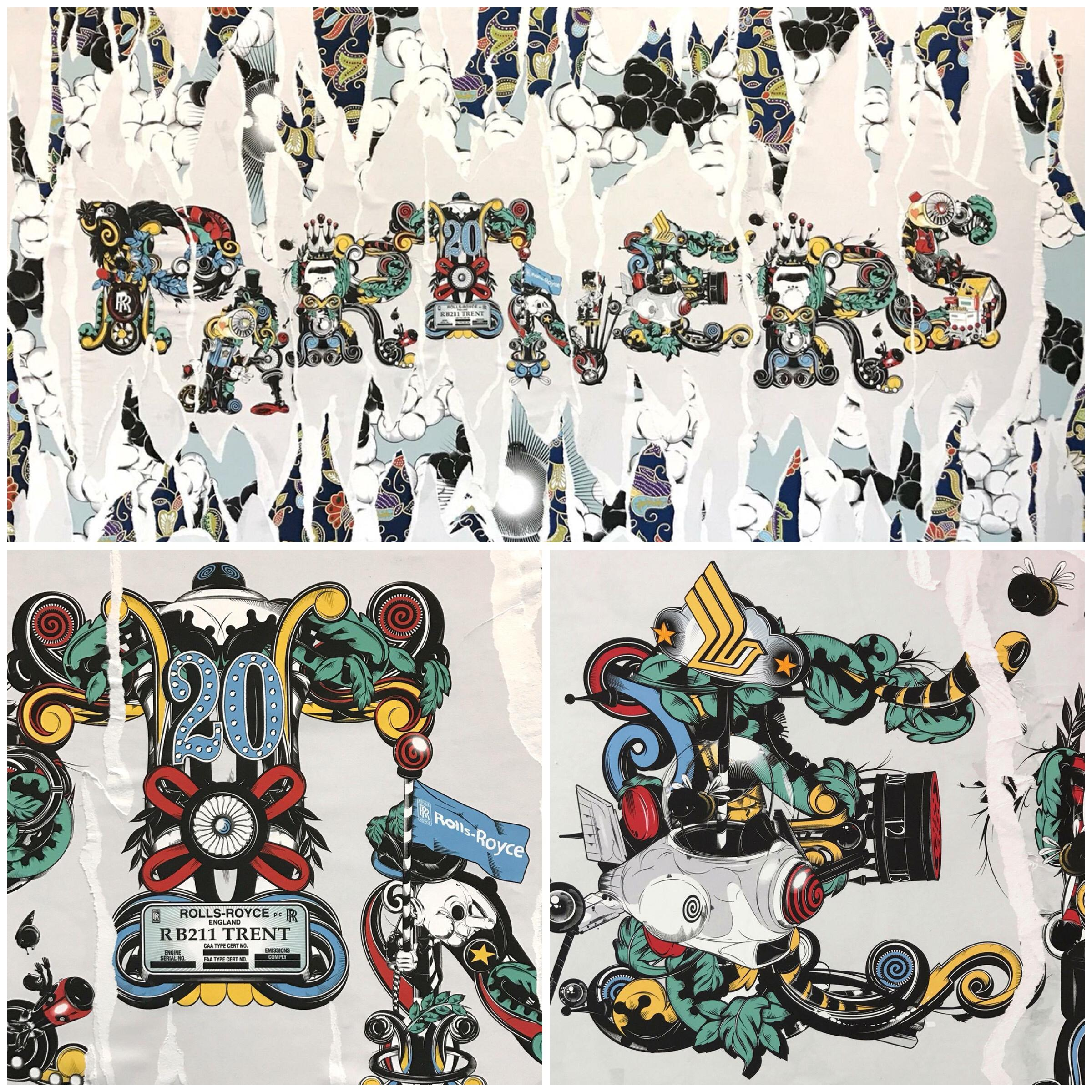
Artwork by PHUNK celebrating Singapore Airlines and Rolls-Royce

In 2015, PHUNK designed P for Proust, a customised alphabet inspired by Italian furniture maker Cappellini's Proust Geometrica Chair. They launched several site-specific installations on New York's subway billboards as part of Singapore: Inside Out, a showcase to celebrate Singapore's 50th birthday. In Singapore, PHUNK launched A to Z: For Children of All Ages at Art Seasons. The collective was also featured in the publication Visible Signs: An introduction to Semiotics in the Visual Arts by David Crow.

Thereafter, they launched a solo exhibition at Owen James Gallery in New York. In 2017, PHUNK was commissioned to create a new piece of artwork to commemorate the 20th anniversary of partnership between Rolls-Royce and Singapore Airlines, and was named as one of 10 essential artist collectives to know in Asia by art website and directory The Artling.

In 2018, they exhibited their series When The Saints Go Marching In at Art Stage Singapore.

== Selected works ==
Notable works by PHUNK include:

Title of artwork / series	Year
32 Stories	2012
Army of Love	2012
Control Chaos	2003–2007
Cosmic Triptych	2015
Day & Night III	2015
Daydreamers	2010–2013
D.I.S.C.O. (Dreams in Social Cosmic Odyssey)	2010
Electricity	2006
Eccentric City	2010
F.A.I.T.H. (Spring)	2013
From The Bottom Of My Pencil Case	2008
Fuck Art	2015
Hello	2015
H.O.P.E. (Golden)	2013
Hope, Kiss, Live, Rock	2017
Lao Fu Zhi	2014
Lei Gong	2006
L.O.V.E.	2013
Love Supreme	2007
Monsieur Robo's Electric Circus	2008
Neverland	2009
New Dreams Of An Old World	2014
Pseudo Human Being	2005
Queer	2015
The King Of Dreams (with Nathan Yong)	2012
Underworld 2	2010
Universality	2007
Universe	2007–2008
When The Saints Go Marching In	2007

== Collaborations ==
Collaborator	Description	Year
B.Bike	Custom bicycle design	2009
BMW	Velocity: print for Jeff Koons' BMW Art Car	2010
Brain Magazine	Cover art	2010
Cappellini	P for Proust: custom alphabet inspired by the Proust Geometrica Chair	2015
Coca-Cola	Artwork for 100 Years of Contour, the centennial anniversary of the Coca-Cola Contour bottle	2014
Comme des Garçons	The Synthetics "Live": installation for Guerilla Store +65	2004
Creative Review	Cover art and feature	2010
Daimler Chrysler	Publication illustration	2003
Deutsche Bank	Love Bomb: site-specific installation for OH! Open House Marina Bay	2013
Gallery LVS	Urban media pole installation	2011
G-Shock	Custom watch design	2010
Harper's Bazaar	Cover art and feature	2014
HBO	Artwork for Game of Thrones Season 3 launch in Asia	2014
Hermès	Sculpture for P.S. I Silk You campaign	2009
Hewlett-Packard	Artwork for Hewlett-Packard Quest	2006
HTC	Artist collaboration series	2010
Levi's	Custom T-shirt series and exhibition	2008
Land Transport Authority	D.I.S.C.O. (Dreams in Social Cosmic Odyssey): sculpture at Promenade MRT Station	2010
MTV	Campaign visuals for World Stage	2010
Nike	Campaign visual for Nike Zoom Tre Skateboarding	2010
Nike	3D animation for Nike SB	2010
Nike	Artist collaboration sculpture	2010
Nike	Artist collaboration logo	2005
Nike	T-shirt design	2005
Nike	Campaign visual for Yut Chi Mah exhibition at Spiritroom Berlin	2002
Nike	Sneaker design	2002
Nike	Site-specific installation	2002
Nokia	Interactive art installation for global stores	2006
OCBC	Artwork for credit cards	2011
Parco	Environmental art and design	2015
Rolls-Royce and Singapore Airlines	Artwork for 20th anniversary celebrations	2017
Staple	Oriental Relation: custom T-shirt design	2006
Singapore Tourism Board	Artwork for Singapore: Inside Out	2015
STPI	Artwork for BMW Young Asian Artists Series II	2008
Tai Ping	Empire of Dreams: custom carpet collection	2013
Tiger Beer	Advertisement artwork	2007
The Rolling Stones	Merchandise design	2011
Time Out HK	Cover art and feature	2009
Uniqlo	Custom T-shirt design	2010
Wanderlust Hotel	Environmental design	2010
Zouk	Publication artwork	2002
Zouk	Artwork for print collateral	2007

== Exhibitions ==
=== Solo exhibitions ===
- PHUNK, Owen James Gallery, New York (2016)
- A TO Z: For Children of All Ages, Art Seasons, Singapore (2015)
- Empire of Dreams II, Art Seasons, Singapore (2013)
- Empire of Dreams I, Gallery J. Chen, Taipei (2012)
- Daydream Nation, Project Stage, ART STAGE, Singapore (2011)
- Welcome to Electricity!, Diesel Gallery, Tokyo, Japan (2010)
- Around The World / Across The Universe, Vallery, Barcelona, Spain (2009)
- New World, Art Seasons, Singapore (2009)
- New World, Art Seasons, Beijing, China (2008)
- KIAF Korea International Art Fair 2008, Seoul, Korea (2008)
- Levi's Art Session 3, Levi's Flagship store, Paris, France (2008)
- Universe II, Gallery J. Chen, Taipei, Taiwan (2008)
- Universe I, Art Seasons, Singapore (2007)
- Universality, Museum of Contemporary Art, Taipei, Taiwan (2007)
- Decade of Decadence, Singapore History Museum, Singapore (2005)
- Baroqracy, Pixie Gallery, Taipei (2005)
- Baroqracy II, Tuami, Ecuador (2005)
- Split, Nike Spiritroom, Berlin (2005)
- The Synthetics "Live", Comme des Garçon Guerrilla Store +65, Singapore (2004)
- Control Chaos IV, OFFF, Valencia (2004)
- Control Chaos III, Our Spot Gallery, Sydney, Australia (2004)
- Control Chaos II, :b Gallery, Singapore (2003)
- Control Chaos, The Reed Space, New York (2003)

=== Group exhibitions ===
- ART STAGE, Art Seasons, Singapore (2018)
- The Artling Pop-Up, Artspace @ Helutrans, Singapore (2017)
- Fiction of Precision, Art Galleries Association Singapore, Millenia Walk, Singapore (2017)
- Singapore Chinese Cultural Centre, Singapore (2017)
- Art on Paper, Pier 36 NYC, New York (2017)
- ART STAGE, Singapore (2017)
- Highlight, Design Koishikawa, Japan (2016)
- Supermama Porcelain Festival, Gillman Barracks, Singapore (2016)
- ART STAGE, Art Seasons, Singapore (2016)
- Art Central, Hong Kong (2015)
- Cappellini Capsule Project, DREAM, Singapore (2015)
- Singapore: Inside Out, Beijing, London, New York, Singapore (2015)
- 50 Years of Singapore Design, National Design Centre, Singapore (2015)
- H for House, Art in Your Neighborhood, Singapore (2015)
- ART STAGE, Art Seasons, Singapore (2015)
- Fukuoka Art Triennale 2014, Fukuoka Asian Art Museum, Japan (2014)
- Modern Love: LASALLE 30th Anniversary exhibition, Institute of Contemporary Art, Singapore (2014)
- Daydreams + Nightmares, The Substation, Singapore (2014)
- Art Toilet, Fukuoka Parco, Japan (2014)
- New Icon: Pop in Asia, Komunitas Salihara, Jakarta, Indonesia (2014)
- Singapore Pop-Up Show, Art Seasons, Singapore (2014)
- Korea International Art Fair, Art Seasons, Seoul, Korea (2014)
- ART STAGE, Art Seasons, Singapore (2014)
- Welcome to the Jungle, Yokohama Museum of Art, Japan (2013)
- Welcome to the Jungle, Contemporary Art Museum, Kumamoto, Japan (2013)
- HBO Game of Thrones Art Exhibition, The Luxe Art Museum, Singapore (2013)
- OH! Open House, Marina Bay, Singapore (2013)
- Beirut Art Fair, Beirut, Lebanon (2013)
- Panos, Lyon, France (2013)
- ART STAGE, Art Seasons, Singapore (2013)
- Singapore Show: Future Proof 2012, Singapore Art Museum, Singapore (2012)
- Panorama: Recent Art from Contemporary Asia, Singapore Art Museum, Singapore (2012)
- Future Pass – From Asia to the World, National Taiwan Museum of Fine Art, Taiwan (2012)
- The Book Show, Sculpture Square, Singapore (2012)
- ART STAGE, Art Seasons, Singapore (2012)
- A Little Light Magic, Singapore Art Museum, Singapore (2011)
- New Pop New World, Element Art Space, Singapore (2011)
- Future Pass – From Asia to the World, 54th Venice Biennale, Italy (2011)
- Unshakeable – Aid to Japan, Light Editions Gallery, Singapore (2011)
- Future Pass – From Asia to the World, Wereldmuseum, Rotterdam, Netherlands (2011)
- Design Possible, Kaohsiung Design Festival, Taiwan (2010)
- Campaign City, Evil Empire, Singapore (2010)
- Very Fun Park 2010, Taipei Public Art Festival, Taiwan (2010)
- You West I East, Shenzhen Fine Art Museum, China (2010)
- Animamix Biennial 2009–10, Metaphors of Un/Real, MoCA Shanghai, China (2010)
- OH! Open House, Singapore (2009)
- P.S. I Silk You, Hermès, Singapore (2009)
- ARTSingapore, Singapore (2009)
- Self-Portraits, CircleCulture Gallery, Berlin, Germany (2009)
- Beyond Comfort, Art Seasons Lakeside Zurich, Switzerland (2009)
- ArtHK Fair, Hong Kong (2009)
- Art Fair Tokyo @ TOKIA, Tokyo, Japan (2009)
- BMW Young Asian Artists Series II: The Singapore Edition, STPI, Singapore (2009)
- Accessible Art Fair, New York, USA (2008)
- No Comply 2008 Skateboard Art Exhibition, No Vacancy Gallery, Melbourne, Australia (2008)
- Panos 2013, Lyon, France (2008)
- ARTSingapore, Singapore (2008)
- SHcontemporary, Shanghai, China (2008)
- New Wave, Creative Centre of Communications, Shizuoka, Japan (2008)
- 8Q-Rate: School, 8Q, Singapore Art Museum, Singapore (2008)
- Tokyo.Ten Exhibition, Claska Gallery, Tokyo, Japan (2008)
- GDFB (Graphic Design Festival Breda), Netherlands (2008)
- Dual City Sessions: Art With Sound, Berlin, Germany (2008)
- Power of One Charity Exhibition, Hong Kong (2008)
- Shizuoka Content Valley Festival, Creative Centre of Communications, Shizuoka, Japan (2008)
- Art Cologne, Cologne, Germany (2007)
- Animamix Biennale: From Modernity to Eternity, MoCA Shanghai, China (2007)
- Today's Art Festival 2007, The Hague, Netherlands (2007)
- Very Fun Park II, Taipei Public Art Festival, Taiwan (2007)
- Celebrating 50 Years of Helvetica, Design Museum, London, UK (2007)
- Young Talents, Art Cologne, Cologne, Germany (2007)
- Massive Territory, Gallery National Indonesia, Jakarta, Indonesia (2007)
- London Design Festival, London, UK (2006)
- Tokyo Designer's Week, Tokyo, Japan (2006)
- Nike Sum Of All Parts, Tokyo Designer's Week, Tokyo, Japan (2006)
- Secret House, HITEC, Hong Kong (2006)
- "untitled" – Documents Of Street Culture (travelling show), BBB, Barcelona, Spain; BBB, Berlin, Germany (2006)
- 20/20 Singapore Design Movement, London Design Festival, London, UK (2006)
- Gwangju Design Biennale, Gwangju, Korea (2005)
- Get it Louder, Shanghai, China (2005)
- Street Life, Agnès B., Singapore (2004)
- Place, Museu Valencia de la Il.lustració i La Modernitat, València, Spain (2004)
- Pictoplasma "Characters at War!", Zentralbuero, Berlin (2004)
- Fascination, Singapore Art Museum, Singapore (2002)
- Made In Singapore, Art Seasons, Singapore (2002)
- We Love Utopia, Magma Gallery, London, UK (2002)

=== Joint exhibitions ===
- :phunkTanaaMIX, Art Seasons, Singapore (2010)
- Eccentric City: Rise and Fall, Institute of Contemporary Art, Singapore (2010)

=== Public collection ===
- Singapore Art Museum, Singapore
- UNEEC Culture and Education Foundation, Taiwan

=== Public art ===
- DREAM, Bench Project, URA, Singapore (2014)
- Dreams In Social Cosmic Odyssey, Promenade MRT Station, Land Transport Authority, Singapore (2010)

=== Corporate commission ===
- Rolls-Royce and Singapore Airlines: 20th anniversary celebrations

== Publications ==
- Around The World Across The Universe: PHUNK, Art Seasons (2009)
- Universality: Phunk Studio, Page One (2007)
- Mono Number One: Phunk Studio, Rebel One (2004)
- Transmission 02: Utopia, Phunk Studio (2001)

== Gallery ==
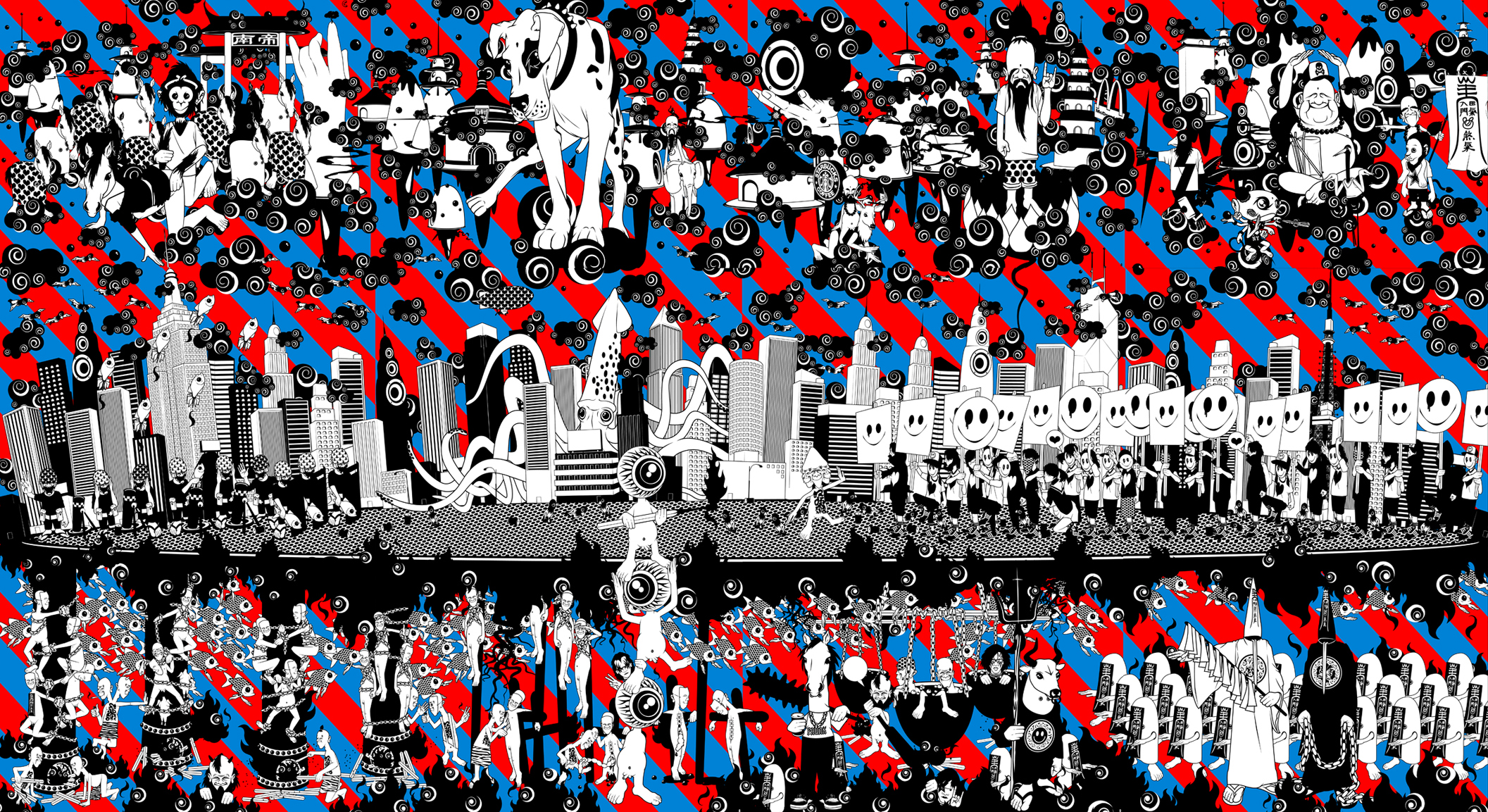
Control Chaos, 2003

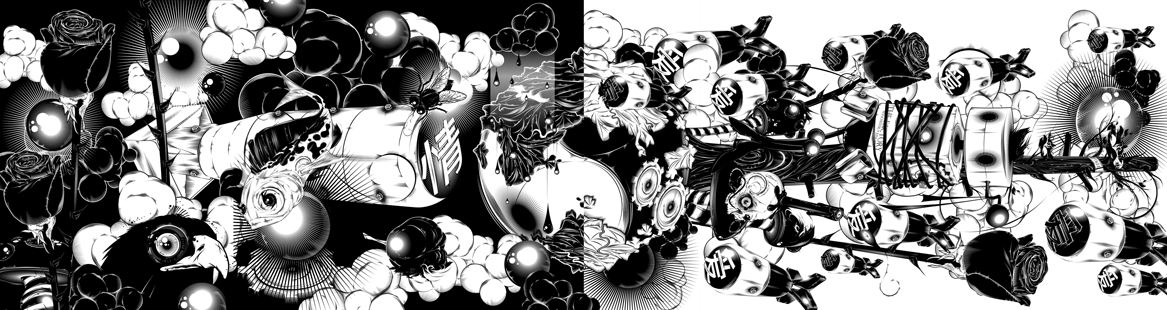
Universality I, 2007

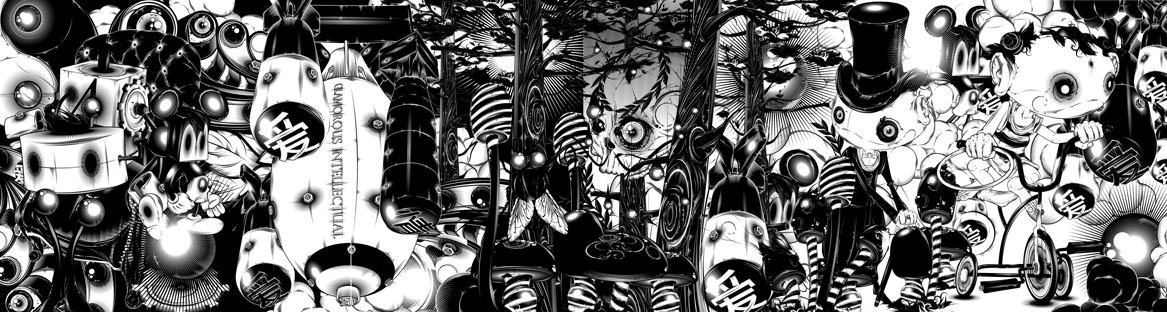
Universality II, 2007

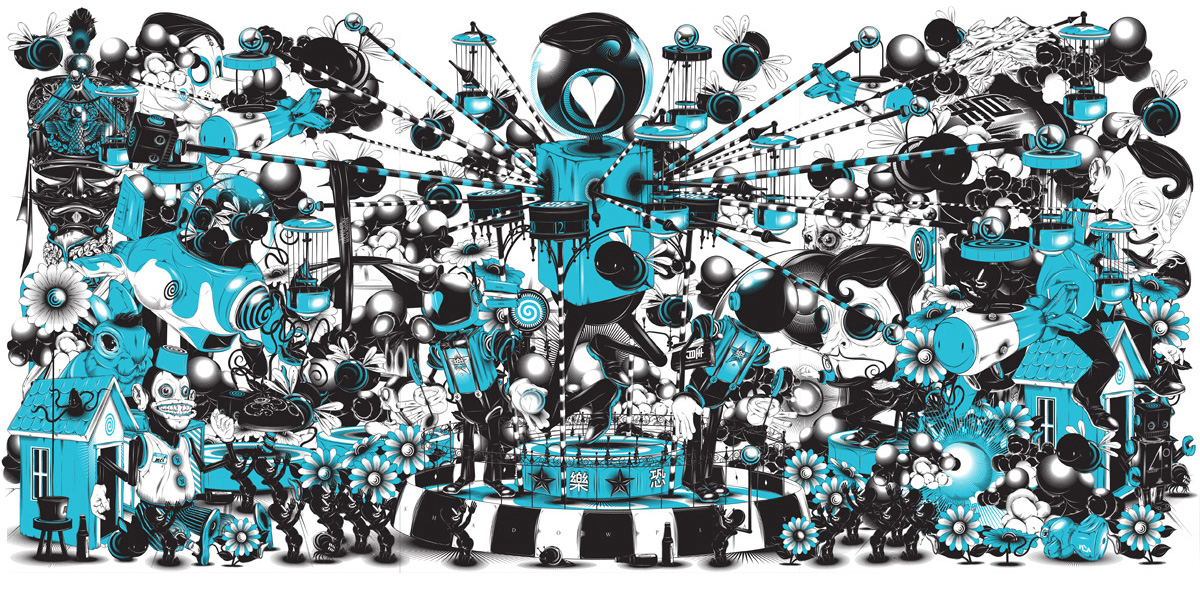
New World Triptych, 2008
