= Melvin Chee =

Singaporean designer, artist and painter

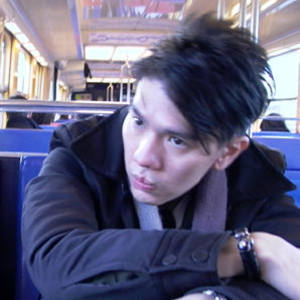
- Education: LASALLE College of the Arts
- Occupations: Artist, painter

Melvin Chee (born 1974) is a Singaporean designer, artist and painter. He is one of the founding partners of contemporary art and design collective PHUNK.

== Education ==
Chee graduated in 1994 with a Diploma in Visual Communications (Graphic Design) from LASALLE College of the Arts.

== Career ==
Chee met the founding members of PHUNK while they were studying at LASALLE College of the Arts. Upon their graduation in 1994, they decided to form the art and design collective together. They have since presented and collaborated with brands and organisations around the world, such as Nike, MTV, HBO and The Rolling Stones. In 2007, they were conferred the Designer of the Year Award at the President’s Design Award in Singapore.

As a self-taught painter, Chee works primarily in the medium of oil on canvas. He is represented by Saatchi Art, and describes his work as being a process of “putting [his] observations on canvas.”
