= SuttonBeresCuller =

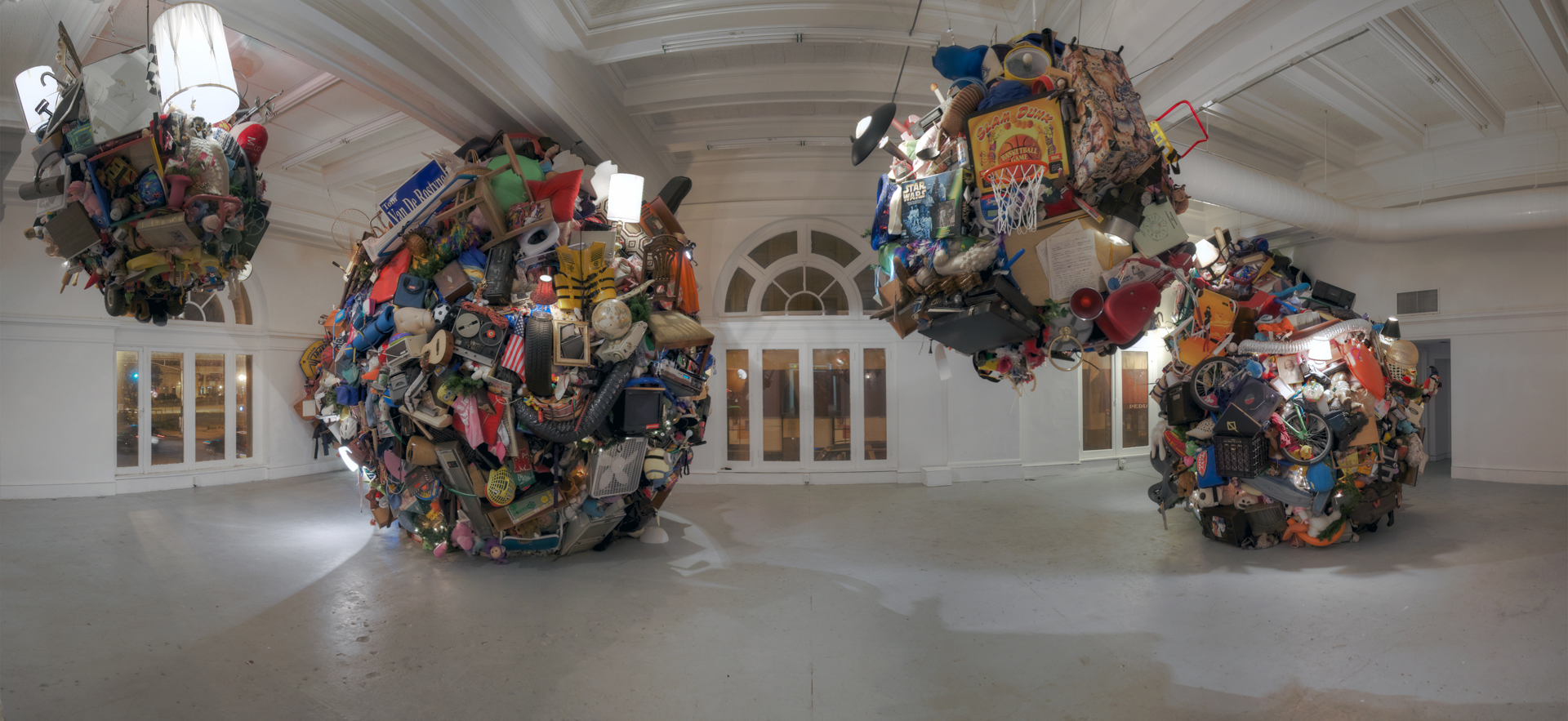
Small Moons, 2012

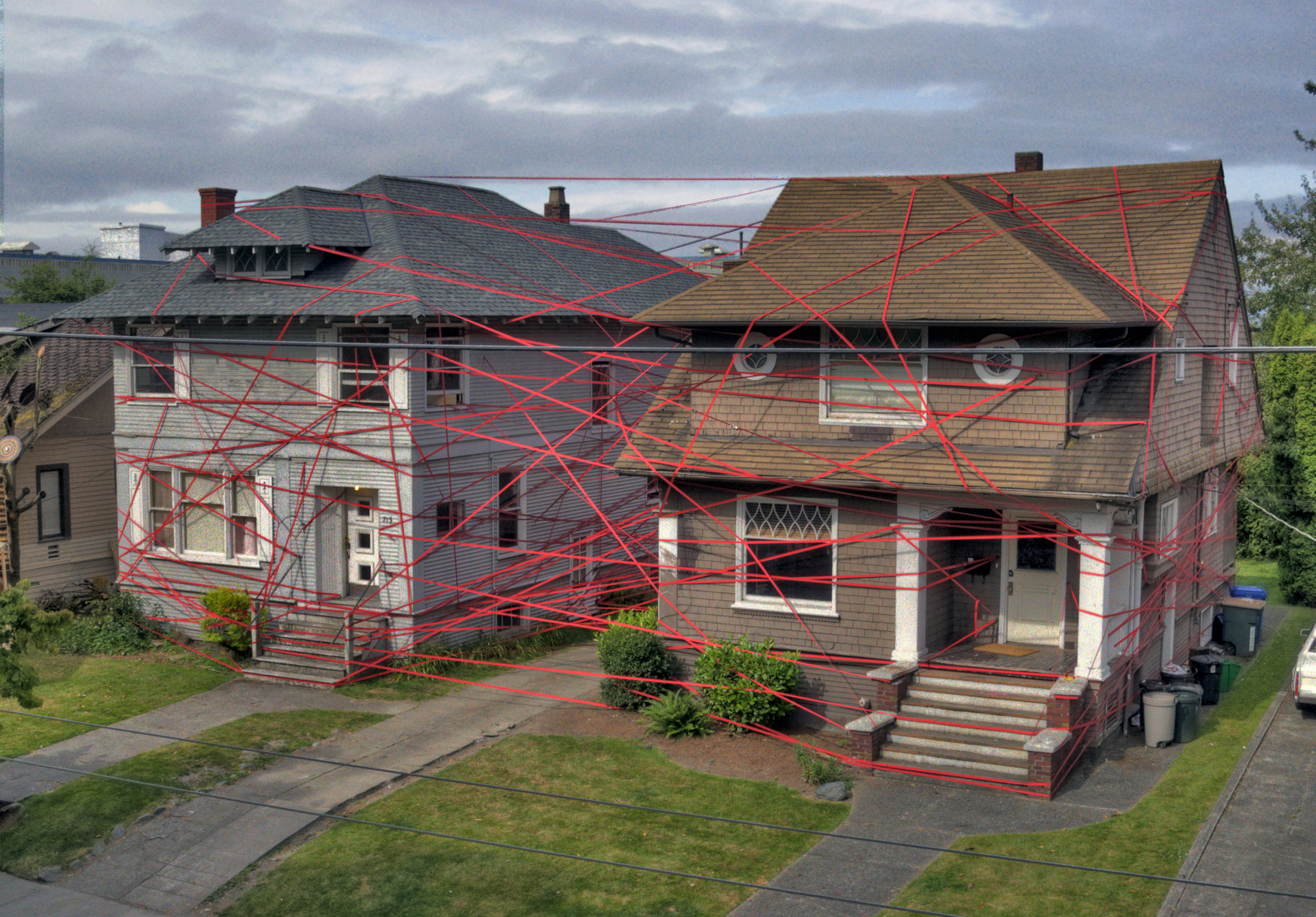
Ties That Bind, 2011

SuttonBeresCuller is a Seattle-based art collective who create sculpture, drawing, site-specific installation and public art environments. The artists, John Sutton (born 1975 in Tacoma, WA, USA), Ben Beres (born 1976 in Akron, OH, USA) and Zac Culler (born 1977 in Boston, MA, USA) have been working collaboratively since graduating from Cornish College of the Arts in Seattle, WA in 2000.

In 2011, SuttonBeresCuller were awarded the Kayla Skinner Special Recognition Award from the Seattle Art Museum, and a Creative Capital Grant in 2008 for their ongoing project Mini Mart City Park, a 1930s-era gas station that will be repurposed into a public green space and conservatory in Georgetown, Seattle, WA. SuttonBeresCuller transformed the land by selling "Canned Dirt" for $50 a can. While this only packages and redistributes the contaminated dirt, it has fundraised money for chemical pumps that pulls harmful toxins out of the soil in Georgetown. What was initially a year-long project has turned into 'full-scale social project that is challenging environmental policy and creating an entirely new model for how communities can work collaboratively to transform contaminated sites in their own backyards,' leading Art:21 writer Jessica Lott to refer to them as 'Accidental Activists'.

SuttonBeresCuller's large-scale installation Big Top Grand Stand premiered at Nuit Blanche in Toronto, Canada in 2014, and is currently on view at MASS MoCA.

SuttonBeresCuller are represented by Los Angeles, CA gallery GUSFORD, and Greg Kucera Gallery in Seattle, WA.

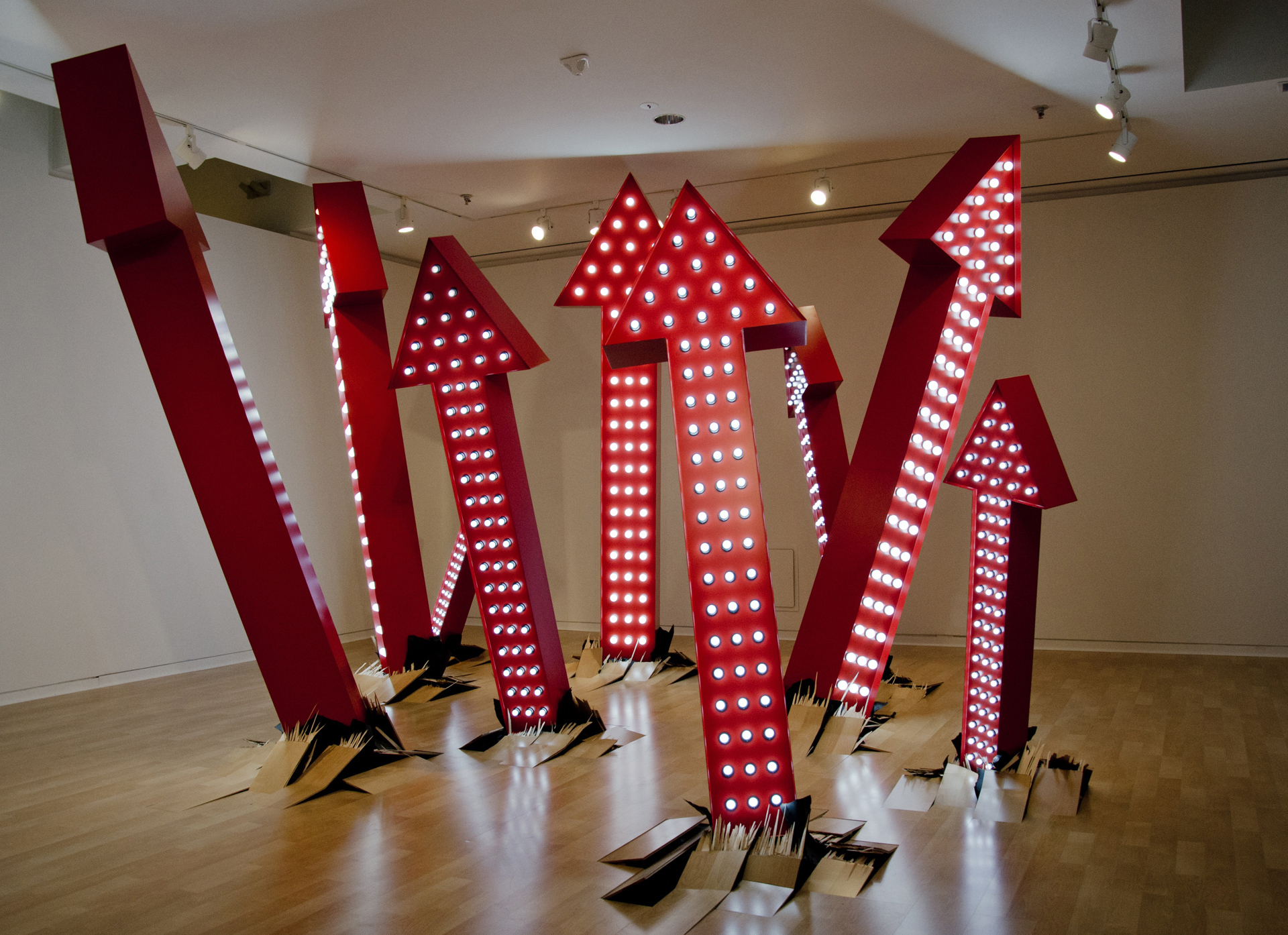
You Always Leave Me Wanting More, 2015
