= Alvin Tan (artist) =

Singaporean artist, designer and creative director

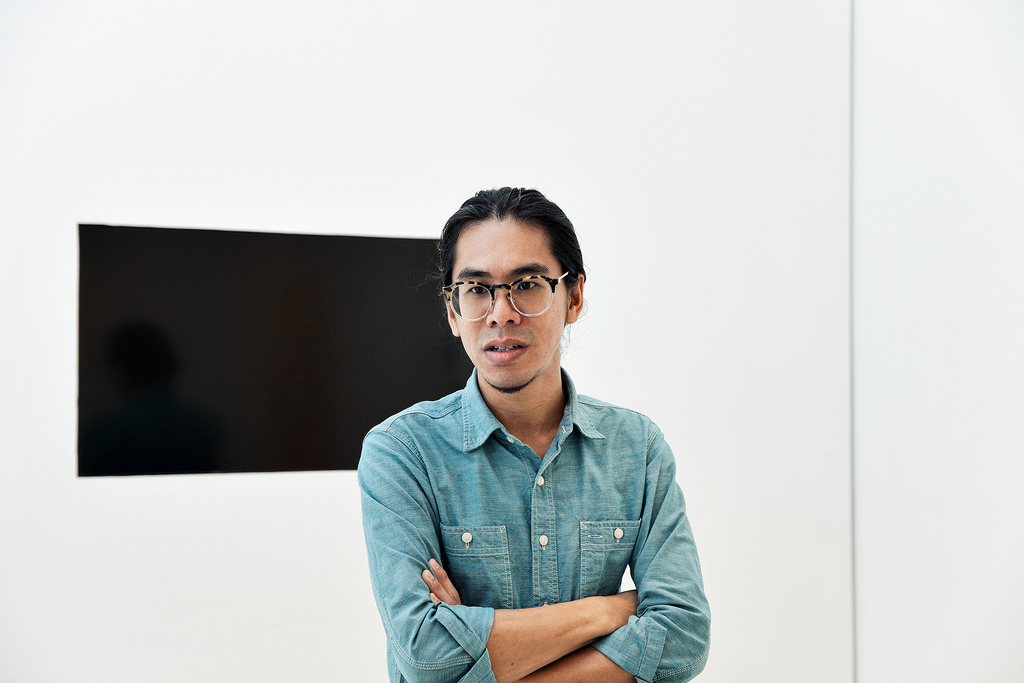
- Born: 1974 (age 51–52)
- Education: Goldsmiths, University of London / LASALLE College of the Arts
- Occupations: Artist, designer, and creative director

Alvin Tan (born 1974) is a Singaporean artist, designer and creative director. He is one of the founding partners of contemporary art and design collective PHUNK, and the co-founder of eyewear label Mystic Vintage.

== Education ==
Tan graduated in 1994 with a Diploma in Visual Communications (Graphic Design) from LASALLE College of the Arts. In 2015, he earned a Masters in Fine Art from Goldsmiths, University of London / LASALLE College of the Arts.

== Career ==
As a solo artist, Tan has collaborated with brands such as Cartier, Johnnie Walker and Onitsuka Tiger. In 2008, he was selected to be part of the Design Jury for the inaugural Cannes Lions Award.

In 2015, Tan was invited to create a sculpture piece for the sixth edition of ArtStage Singapore. The sculpture, titled Fragments of the Heart, has since become part of Cartier Singapore's collection, where it remains on permanent exhibition at the flagship boutique.

=== PHUNK ===
Tan met the founding members of PHUNK while they were studying at LASALLE College of the Arts. Upon their graduation in 1994, they decided to form the art and design collective together. They have since presented and collaborated with brands and organisations around the world, such as Nike, MTV, HBO and The Rolling Stones. In 2007, they were conferred the Designer of the Year Award at the President's Design Award in Singapore.

=== Mystic Vintage ===
In 2008, Tan formed eyewear label Mystic Vintage with Jason Tong and San Yin Mei. After building a collection of original vintage frames from iconic brands, they debuted their own frame, Lullaby, in 2010.

The label has since expanded their collection, which includes Thunderdodge, a pair of sunglasses commissioned by M-Lounge to celebrate the F1 festivities; and Spinal Gaze, a collaboration with artist SBTG.

=== Fragments Of ===
In addition to his work with PHUNK and Mystic Vintage, Tan runs an ongoing art project titled Fragments Of, which is concerned with creating sculptural art and jewellery through the process of 3D printing.

Tan considers his practice to be a journey towards understanding abstract visuals and imagination, and how they relate to emotions through the mediums of static and moving visuals, objects, and experiences. He has spoken about the influence and inspiration he draws from kaleidoscopic art, in particular, the geometrical shapes and patterns that form through movement.

In 2018, Tan was invited to curate 10 pieces of art for Cartier's flagship boutique with design firm Laank. He was subsequently commissioned to create a new art object, Fragments of Time, for the brand.
