= Shinro Ohtake =

Japanese artist (born 1955)

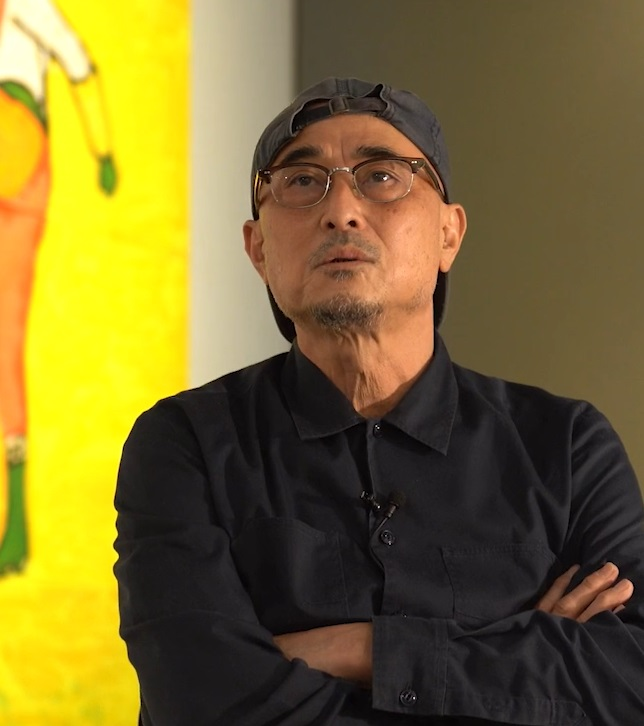
Shinro Ohtake 2022

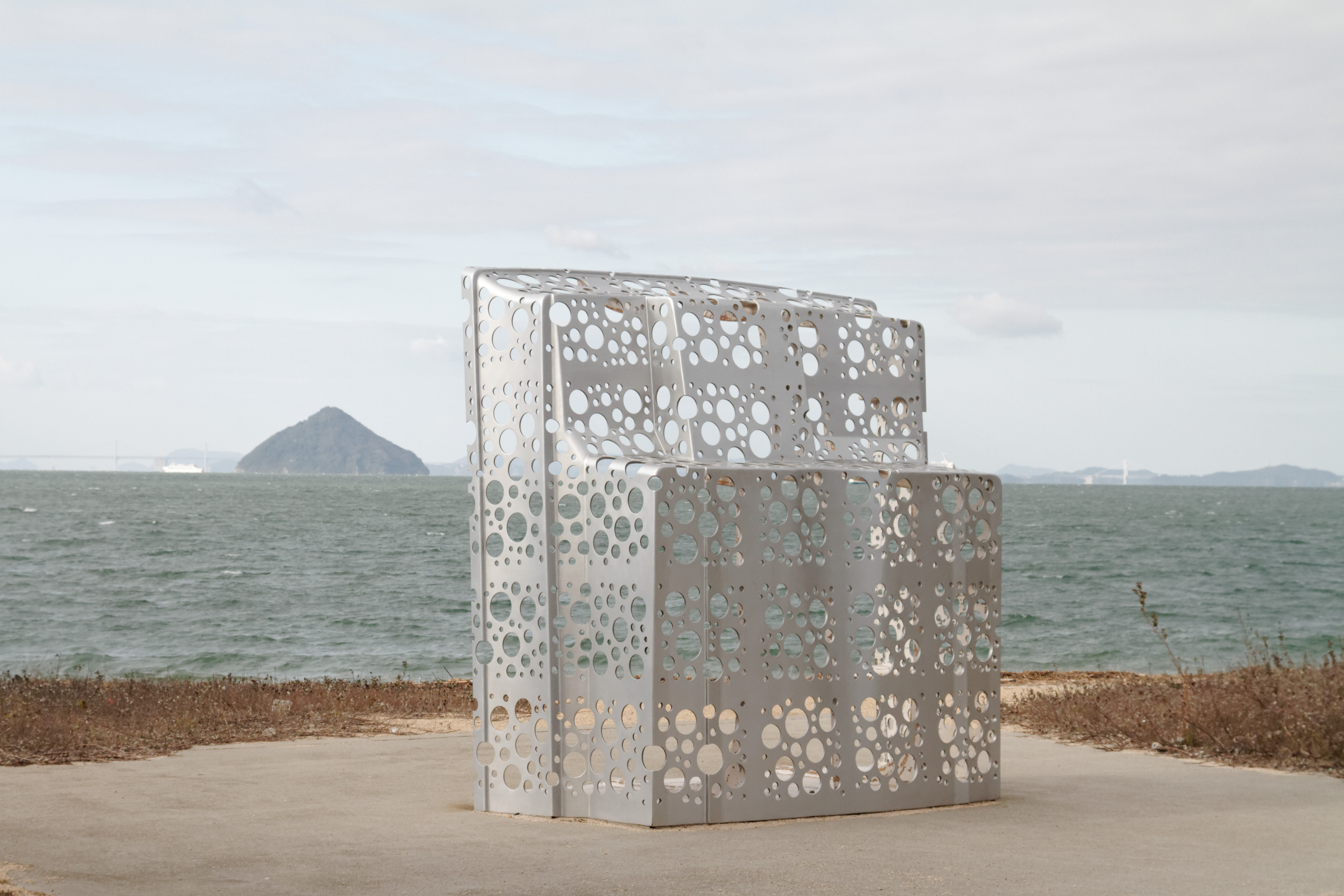
Shipyard Works - Stern with Hole 2011

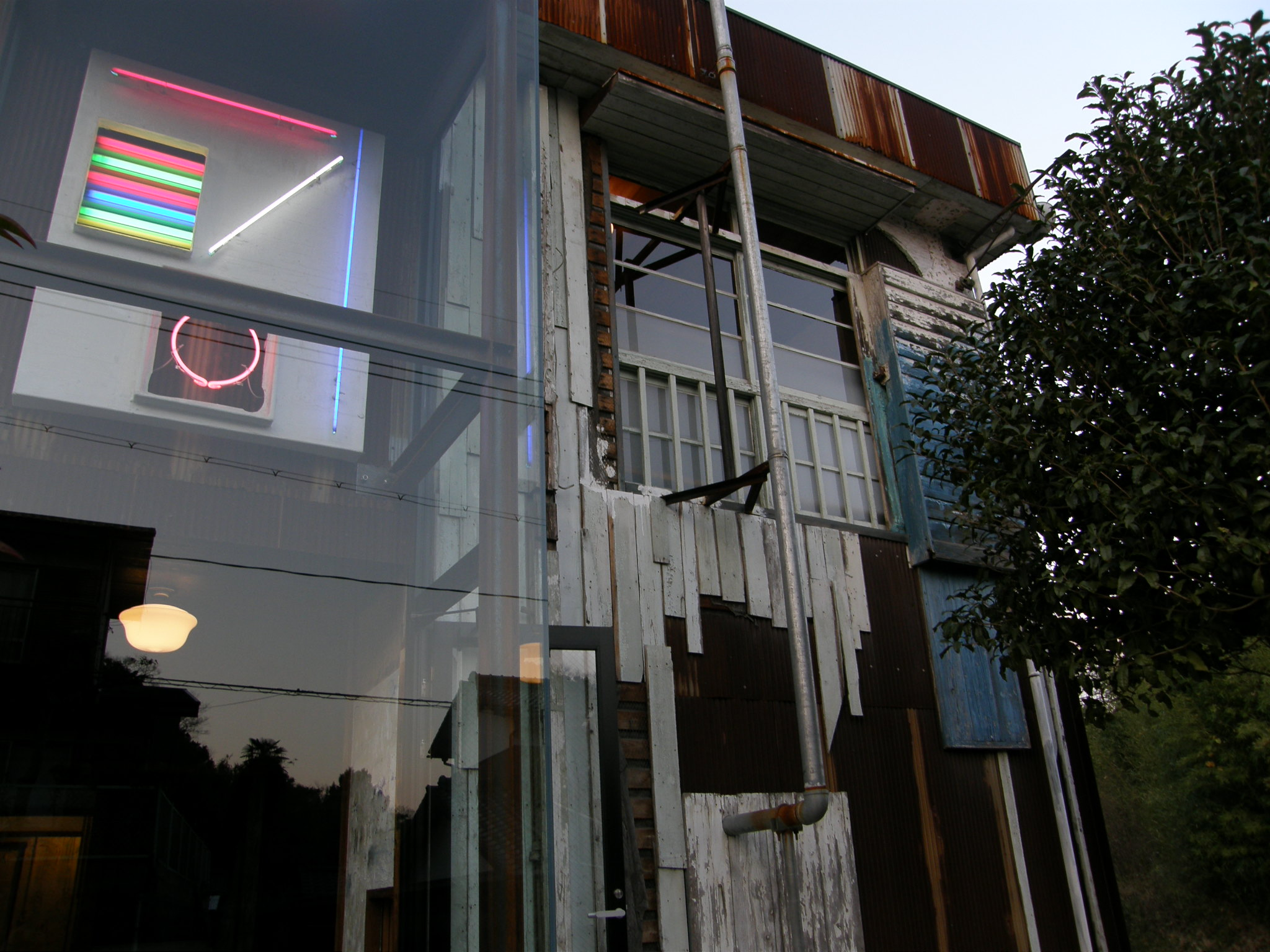
Art house project in Naoshima, Kagawa

Shinro Ohtake (大竹 伸朗, Ōtake Shinrō; born 8 October 1955) is a Japanese artist who was born in Tokyo and lives in Uwajima, Japan. He paints, creates installations and designs record covers and book covers. He has published dozens of books, such as a dream diary, a picture book, essays and art books.

== Education ==
In 1974, Ohtake entered the oil painting department of Musashino Art University, but took several leaves of absence, traveling to Hokkaido and later London. He returned to school after these periods away and graduated in 1980.

== Career ==
In 2015 he did a residency at the fine printing and paper institute, STPI, in Singapore.

He exhibited many works of collaged, sculptural artist books at Venice Biennale's Encyclopedic Palace in 2013.

He presented his works at the documenta 13 exhibition in Kassel, Germany.

He formed a music and art group called Puzzle Punks, with Yamatsuka Eye who is a member of Boredoms. He also collaborated with Vaughan Oliver.

He designed the public bathhouse and art facility Naoshima Bath "I♥湯" (or Naoshima Bathhouse "I Love Yu"), as well as Haisha House, part of the Art House Project collaborations on the island of Naoshima.
