= Dave White (artist) =

Contemporary British artist

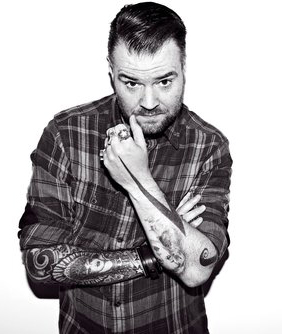
- White in 2016
- Education: Liverpool John Moores
- Known for: Pop Art; Contemporary Art; Expressionism; Painting
- Notable work: Americana; Sneakers
- Movement: Pop Art, Contemporary Art

Dave White is a contemporary British artist, and has exhibited his work internationally whilst working with various with clients for Nike, AOL, and Air Jordan.

== Background and career ==
Touted as the UK's "Andy Warhol", he has worked on various subject matters inspired by popular culture.

While enrolled in Liverpool John Moores University in 1991 to study Fine Art, White painted in John Lennon's old art studio. After graduating in 1994, White exhibited in the Northern Graduates Exhibition at the Royal College of Art in London. White's work was represented by Anthony Brown of the art gallery Connaught Brown through a five-year artist/gallery relationship and exhibited at art fairs and galleries all over the world. White is currently represented by GUSFORD.

== Early works ==
Since 2002, White's work has been celebrated for his dedication to a sneaker series, pioneering the movement known as 'sneaker art' which has resulted in international exhibitions and appearances. Companies such as Nike own a series of his work in their corporate collections and continue to collaborate with him. His collection has been exhibited globally, ranging from the People's Square Exhibition Hall in Shanghai to the Atlanta Contemporary Art Centre in the USA.

In 2007, White was commissioned by Coca-Cola to create a painting of Jay Z's new design for Cherry Coke. White's work was exhibited at the Dia Arts Centre in New York and is now displayed at Coca-Cola Headquarters in Atlanta, USA. 2007 also brought White's debut solo exhibition during Art Basel Miami titled The Good, The Bad and The Ugly, featuring large scale superhero portraits.

In 2008, White held his debut solo exhibition of his vintage military inspired pop art portraits in a show entitled Planes, Tanks and Automatics at the Truman Brewery during Frieze week. His work was featured in the Wall Street Journal and "sold briskly" in spite of economic turmoil. Stephen Adams of The Daily Telegraph described him as "one of Britain's most feted up and coming painters".

== Later works and collaborations ==
In 2010, White exhibited at the New Museum of Contemporary Art in New York on the 'Project on Creativity' with Chuck Close, celebrating Aol's 25th Anniversary. White was also invited to create a live installation at All Things Digital in Los Angeles. Later in the year he was also commissioned to create his largest work 'Rodeo Rider', measuring 11 ft x 8 ft for Aol's New York headquarters.

In 2011, White collaborated with Air Jordan in Los Angeles for their corporate responsibility program 'WINGS for the Future', designing 23 pairs of bespoke All Star sneakers which were auctioned for charity, raising $23,000.

White's collection of work Americana exhibited in London and Copenhagen in 2011 and was featured on BBC Radio 2's The Arts Show, as well as in international press. In 2014, White had his first solo exhibition at GUSFORD, debuting the Apex series featuring great white sharks. In 2016, White collaborated with Nike to release two colorways of the Nike Air Max 95, inspired by Britain's native wildlife.

== Select press ==
- Ibyen (Denmark)
- Art Daily
- Art Observed
- El Pais
- Bloomberg Press
- Art Info
