= Christine Ay Tjoe =

Indonesian painter (born 1973)

- Born: Christine Ay Tjoe; September 27, 1973 (age 52); Bandung, West Java, Indonesia
- Education: Bandung Institute of Technology
- Known for: Painting
- Style: Abstract expressionism
- Awards: Prudential Eye Award for Best Emerging Asian Artist (2015); Asia Arts Game Changer Award (2018)

Christine Ay Tjoe (born September 27, 1973) is an Indonesian abstract expressionist painter from Bandung, Indonesia. Her artwork consists mainly of abstract compositions featuring a variety of colors and figurative forms." Ay Tjoe’s style is distinguished by strong, expressive lines, abstract figures, and varied brushstroke techniques. She received multiple awards, including the Prudential Eye Award.

== Early life ==
Christine Ay Tjoe was born September 27, 1973, in Bandung, Indonesia. She graduated in 1997 from the Faculty of Fine Arts and Design at the Bandung Institute of Technology, where she studied graphic design and printmaking. After working in the fashion and textile industry, she began pursuing art full-time. Her first exhibition took place in 1999.

== Style and technique ==
Ay Tjoe works with various mediums, including painting, printmaking, soft sculptures, and large-scale installations. While at the Bandung Institute of Technology, she studied diverse art techniques such as intaglio printing and graphic arts. Initially specializing in printmaking, she later explored intaglio drypoint prints, woodcuts, and textiles. She only began painting later in her career. In an interview with Studio International, Ay Tjoe expressed, "It doesn't matter what the medium is, as long as the process is drawing. I will always treat every medium as paper and pencil." After experimenting with different art methods, she transitioned from creating drypoint works on paper to using oil bar on canvas, which is now one of her signature styles.

Drawing on Southeast Asia's cultural diversity and ethnic heritage, her works follow themes based on Christian narratives and spiritual concepts, often emphasizing human imperfections and the duality of existence. Ay Tjoe has stated that her Christian faith influences some of her artistic themes. Her works frequently feature strong lines and abstract figurative elements. She uses varied brushstroke techniques that produce shifts in texture within her works. Her works often include layered imagery and clusters of color. Her compositions frequently explore the use of positive and negative space and contrasting colors.

Beginning in 2010, the color palette of her paintings shifted, transitioning from primarily muted and earthy tones to brighter hues, such as: rose, pale pink, vermilion, ochre, and rich brown. This shift contributed to a more intimate feel in her compositions. An example is the painting The Curious Hole, created around the time her first child was born. It has been interpreted as depicting a sense of beginning – a delicate representation of the exhilaration of birth and the fragility of newborn life.

In the painting The Workers, Ay Tjoe utilized the intaglio drypoint technique and experimented with line architecture and form. Engaging directly with the piece, she used her hands to rub the lines, creating mixes of color fields. The Workers explores the sensation of polar opposites, particularly between loneliness and joy, often rendered dramatically with black and white compositions. Through this painting, Ay Tjoe has discussed the significance of teamwork and partnership, especially emphasizing the value of earnest collaboration to foster kindness, faith, hope, and love.

== Solo exhibitions ==
While Ay Tjoe's works address many aspects of humanity, her solo exhibitions often reflect her perspective on the relationship between individuals and the general public at specific points throughout the years.

=== Eksekusi Ego (2006) ===
Following her solo exhibition at Edwin's Gallery in 2003, Ay Tjoe returned to Jakarta, Indonesia in 2016 for her fourth solo show. Titled "Eksekusi Ego" (Ego Execution), the exhibition explored the existence of self and questioned societal norms. A series of pencil works in the exhibition "blurs the ego by concealing the faces or identities in the collective of figures that now appear in layered meanings," according to art critic Carla Bianpoen. Bianpoen observed that, compared to earlier exhibitions focusing on individuality, the artist appeared to be "now desperately trying to comply with society," suggesting a portrayal of killing one's ego to blend in.

=== Panorama Without Distance (2009) ===
Ay Tjoe used typewriters connected to loudspeakers as interactive elements. She also addresses the idea that humans can reach another reality only by going beyond or disrupting chaotic daily activities. As art critic Hendro Wiyanto commented, "Only by going beyond daily symptoms, perhaps also by destroying its phenomenal forms, can a screen to another reality be discovered. Only by going beyond the chaos, without denying it, can we encounter the cosmos, a cosmos that contains chaos or a chaosmos." This artwork received the first SCMP/Art Futures award in Hong Kong.

=== BLACK, KCALB, BLACK, KCALB (2018) ===
In Ay Tjoe's 2018 exhibition at White Cube, London, she prominently used black to represent "the dark potential which all people have." She was inspired by Johann Wolfgang von Goethe's essay on Faust. The story, in her view, depicts humanity as a whole, encompassing both positive and negative aspects of body and soul. Through the story, she explored the darker aspects of human nature. As she stated, "The reality is that darkness is part of human nature." Ay Tjoe reinforces the concept of imperfection, encouraging individuals to act with good deeds despite inherent human flaws.

List of solo exhibitions
Year	Title	Location
2001	Buka Untuk Melihat	Redpoint Gallery, Bandung, Indonesia
2002	At The Day of German Unity	German Embassy, Jakarta, Indonesia
2003	Reach Me	Cemeti Art House, Yogyakarta, Indonesia
	Aku / Kau / Uak	Edwin's Gallery, Jakarta, Indonesia
2006	Eksekusi Ego	Edwin's Gallery, Jakarta, Indonesia
2007	Silent Supper	Ark Galerie, Jakarta, Indonesia
2008	Wall Prison (part two)	Scope Miami Art Fair, Miami, United States
	Interiority of Hope	Emmitan CA Gallery, Surabaya, Indonesia
2009	Panorama Without Distance	Hong Kong Art Fair, Hong Kong Convention & Exhibition Centre
	Eating Excess	Singapore Tyler Print Institute, Singapore
2010	Lama Sabahktani Club	Lawangwangi Art & Science Estate, Bandung, Indonesia
	Symmetrical Sanctuary	Sigi Art Gallery, Jakarta, Indonesia
2015	Perfect Imperfection	SongEun ArtSpace Seoul, South Korea
2018	BLACK, KCALB, BLACK, KCALB	White Cube London, United Kingdom
	Spirituality and Allegory	21st Century Museum of Contemporary Art, Kanazawa, Japan
2021	Spinning in the Desert	White Cube, Hong Kong
2022	Personal Denominator	ARTJOG MMCCII. Commissioned Artist: Reflection on the Pandemic
2023	The Uncompromising #01	Shanghai, China

Important joint exhibitions

Christine Ay Tjoe has participated in joint exhibitions in several countries, including China, the USA, the UK, Singapore, Taiwan, Indonesia, and Italy. Notable exhibitions include: China National Museum of Fine Art (2003), 1st Beijing International Art Biennale (2003), Johnson Museum of Art, Cornell University, Ithaca, New York (2005), National Gallery, Jakarta (2009), Shanghai Contemporary (2010), Saatchi Gallery, London (2011), Fondazione Claudio Buziol, Venice (2011), Singapore Art Museum (2012), National Taiwan Museum of Fine Arts, Taichung (2012), Royal Academy of Arts, London (2017), Asia Society Triennial, New York (2020), and Joan Mitchell and Christine Ay Tjoe: Two trailblazers of 20th and 21st century abstraction at Mnuchin Gallery, NY, USA (2023).

== Awards ==
- In 2007, she was one of the top five winners of the Philips Morris Indonesia Art Award.
- In 2008, she received an award for her performance in the solo exhibition "Interiority of Hope" at the Emitant Gallery in Surabaya. In the same year, she was an artist residency at STPI Creative Workshop & Gallery in Singapore.
- In 2009, she was awarded the SCMP Art Futures Prize at the Hong Kong Art Fair.
- In 2015, she received the Prudential Eye Award.

== Art market ==
Ay Tjoe's contemporary paintings have achieved high market results, particularly in Asia. In 2017, her painting entitled Small Flies and Other Wings, painted in 2013, sold for HK$11.72 million at the Phillips auction house in Hong Kong, ten times the pre-sale estimate, placing her among the most expensive living Indonesian artists by auction price. The painting depicts life and death, visualized by a swarm of flies. Prices for Ay Tjoe's paintings continue to command high values. In 2021, her 2013 painting Second Studio sold for HK$7.4 million at Sotheby's in Hong Kong.
