= Andrea Hasler =

Swiss sculptor (born 1975)

Andrea Hasler (born 1975) is from Zürich, Switzerland, and creates sculptures that look like they were made with meat.

== Education and personal life ==
Hasler received her MFA from Chelsea College of Art and Design in London, UK in 2002 and currently lives and works in London, UK.

== Work ==
Hasler's works typically use wax, or wax-covered resin, to create a wide range of objects that appear to be made from meat, simulating objects such as purses and tents. Hasler's wax and mixed media sculptures are characterized by a tension between attraction and repulsion, and highly influenced by artists John Isaacs, Berlinde De Bruyckere and Louise Bourgeois. Her 2013 solo exhibition Burdens of Excess re-fashioned high-end designer accessories into bulging globs of pink wax studded with brand-name zipper pulls, insignias, straps and handles.

== Exhibits and awards ==
In 2014, Hasler won the Greenham Common Commission and created a new work, The Matriarch, that took Greenham Common’s history as a starting point, focusing on the Women’s Peace Camp. This work was filmed by BBC for The Culture Show. Hasler also participated in the 3-D Foundation Artist Residency in the mountain town of Verbier, Switzerland creating two site-specific sculptures for the exhibition Mutations: Contemporary Sculpture in Context, curated by Paul Goodwin.

Hasler's solo exhibitions include New Greenham Arts, Newbury, UK; GUSFORD, Los Angeles, CA; Next Level Projects, London, UK; and Artrepco Gallery, Zürich, Switzerland. Her work was also featured in the 2014 book The Language of Mixed-Media Sculpture by Jac Scott.
