= Adam Mars =

American contemporary artist

Adam Mars (born 1981 in Orange County, CA, USA) is a contemporary artist based in Los Angeles, CA, USA known for his custom outfits and text-based paintings, which address the contemporary social experience. He has been referred to as "the Ed Ruscha of the Internet age."

== Early life ==
Mars completed his BA at UC Santa Barbara, Santa Barbara, CA in 2003 and his MFA at Otis College of Art and Design, Los Angeles, CA in 2007. His work has been shown at Torrance Art Museum, Laguna Art Museum, and Cal State Long Beach.

== Career ==
Mars’ works are in the permanent collections of the Museum of Art and History and the Cosmopolitan Hotel in Las Vegas. His work has also been featured in numerous publications like the Los Angeles Times, Los Angeles Magazine, and LA Weekly.

In 2014, Mars created a public billboard as part of LA><ART's public art initiative LA Public Domain. The billboard, installed on La Cienega Boulevard in Los Angeles, CA displayed one of Mars' most iconic witticisms, I Loved You, Then I Googled You. In 2016, he produced a series of nine unique digital billboard images for the city of West Hollywood and WEHO Arts. The images were displayed above 9039 Sunset Blvd. One image, I Need a Ticket to Guns N' Roses in 1986, sparked rumors that the entire original Guns N' Roses lineup would be reuniting for their shows at Dodger Stadium.

Mars has also worked on costume design for musicians like Post Malone, Billie Eilish, Axl Rose, Tyla Yaweh, and the Growlers. He created custom outfits for Malone's 2018-2019 world tour , some of which were featured in the remix video for "Wow" featuring Tyga and Ricchy Ray Charles. He painted an explosive outfit for Eilish's promotional commercial on Saturday Night Live. Rose wore Mars' custom shirts on Guns N' Roses' 2019 US tour. Mars' cosmic hand-painted suits were worn by the Growlers at Growlers Six Festival in October 2017. He also designed the Growlers' costumes for their headlining performance at Beach Goth in August 2018 and their Beach Goth tour.

In July 2018, Mars published a collection of coming-of-age stories called Unreal for Real through New Future Books. The comedic book is based on the wildest adventures from the artist's life and was described by LA Weekly's Arts Editor, Shana Nys Damnbrot, as "an empathetic memoir of emblematic angst and the earnest, if off-kilter, pursuit of happiness."

Mars is a contributor to Matador Network and has worked with the underground art collectives STATION and LEAF, as well as created prints for Gray Area Print and LA><ART.

Mars exhibits with Los Angeles-based gallery River Gallery.
