= Tabaimo =

Japanese artist

Ayako Tabata (born 30 November 1975 –), also known under her artist name Tabaimo, is a contemporary Japanese artist. She combines hand-drawn images and digital manipulation to create large scale animations which evoke traditional Japanese woodblock prints (ukiyo-e) while presenting a pointed, complex view of Japanese society.

The name "Tabaimo" is a portmanteau of her last name, Tabata, and the Japanese word imōto (いもうと), meaning "little sister."

== Early life and education ==
Ayako Tabata was born in Hyogo Prefecture, Japan. She is the middle of three sisters. Her father was a salaryman; her mother, Shion Tabata, is a ceramicist who creates traditional dinnerware in the style of Ogata Kenzan.

She graduated from Kyoto University of Art and Design in 1999.

== Career ==
Tabaimo's first video installation, Japanese Kitchen, directed while she was still a student, attracted attention. Yuka Uematsu, a curator at the National Museum of Art, Osaka, said, "When I first saw her work, I really couldn't believe that a university student had made it […] She was focusing on typical Japanese society, but critically, in her own way."

Tabaimo's first solo show came in 2000 at Kirin Plaza in Osaka, after she'd won the company's Contemporary Award competition. This was followed by inclusion in two international art events, the Yokohama Trienniale (2001) and the Sao Paulo Bienniale (2002). Tabaimo considered a career in design; in 2003 she worked as a graphic designer in London before she decided to pursue a full-time career as an artist.

Still from Japanese Commuter Train, 2001 video installation by Tabaimo.

Although Tabaimo creates more traditionally-formatted drawings and paintings, she has gained a reputation for her video installations. They are generally site-specific, usually projected on multiple planes, suggestive of rooms. The pop artist Keiichi Tanaami, an instructor at Kyoto University, was an important early influence. Tabaimo's work features elements of manga and anime, but it is also inspired by traditional Japanese art forms, particularly ukiyo-e woodblock printing. Birds, insects, sea creatures, and tortoises often appear in her work, intermingling with humans and disembodied human parts in both natural and urban environments, which at times morph into surreal landscapes.

The transformation of familiar objects and situations has the effect of not only questioning their meaning, but challenging the viewer's perception of the work itself: "I don’t just put the work in front of them and make it a comfortable experience for them – they need to be proactive in their viewing...I think the viewers’ stories themselves are the work, so...by setting up spaces which cause the viewer discomfort — spaces which have elements in them that need to be overcome — the works become a participatory experience," she said in 2007. Tabaimo rarely explains her works within exhibitions.

public conVENience (still), 2006, by Tabaimo. Parasol unit, London.

== Selected exhibitions ==
Solo exhibitions include: Utsutsushi Utsushi, Seattle Asian Art Museum, Seattle, WA (2016); San Jose Museum of Art, San Jose, CA (2016); MEKURUMEKU, Museum of Contemporary Art, Sydney, NSW, Australia (2014); Boundary Layer, Parasol unit foundation for contemporary art, London (2010); Danmen, Yokohama Museum of Art, Tokyo (traveled to the National Museum of Art, Osaka) (2009–10); Moderna Museet, Stockholm (2009); Fondation Cartier pour l'Art Contemporain, Paris (2006); YOROYORON, Hara Museum of Contemporary Art, Tokyo (2006).

Tabaimo represented Japan with teleco-soup at the 54th International Art Exhibition, La Biennale di Venezia (2011). International group exhibitions include: the Yokohama Triennale (2001); the São Paulo Art Biennial (2002); the 15th Biennale of Sydney, Australia (2006); and the 52nd International Art Exhibition, La Biennale di Venezia (2007).

Interdisciplinary collaboration is a major part of Tabaimo’s artistic endeavor. Since 2006 she has provided visual elements to performances with Ohad Naharin’s Batsheva Dance Company, choreographer Maki Morishita, architect Yuko Nagayama, and photographer Hiroshi Sugimoto. Tabaimo later worked again with Maki Morishita to create "Fruits borne out of rust".

Her work can be found in the collections of the National Museum of Art, Osaka; Hara Museum of Contemporary Art, Tokyo; the Israel Museum, Jerusalem; MUSAC, Spain; Fondation Cartier pour l'Art Contemporain, Paris; Moderna Museet, Stockholm; Museum of Contemporary Art, Los Angeles, CA; Asia Society Museum, New York, NY; and the Museum of Modern Art, New York, NY.

== Personal life ==
In 2008, after six years of living in Tokyo, Tabaimo moved into her parents' home in Karuizawa, a resort town in Nagano prefecture, along with her younger sister and primary assistant Imoimu.
