= Sun Xun =

Chinese artist (born 1980)

- 孙逊
- Born: 1980 (age 45–46); Fuxin, China
- Occupation: Visual artist
- Years active: 2005-present

Sun Xun (born 1980) is a Chinese artist who works across many mediums including but not limited to acrylic, ink, pastel, traditional animation, and many forms of printmaking like woodcut. Sun is considered one of China's most prolific young artists and has received international acclaim.

== Early life ==
Sun was born in Fuxin, Liaoning Province, China just after the end of the Cultural Revolution.

He studied printmaking at the China Academy of Art, graduating in 2005.

== Career ==
While at the academy he wanted to make films but could not afford a camera. He decided to hand draw his films and began to create his first animations. The traditional mediums of painting, woodcuts, traditional Chinese ink and charcoal drawings are often combined to create the foundation of expressionistic, contemporary stop-motion animated films. His animated film, “Shock of Time”, was made in 2006, a year after he graduated and met with great acclaim. The after effects of the Cultural Revolution have had a significant influence on the work he has created. He used newspapers from the 1950s to be the background of each frame in “Shock of Time”. He founded an animation studio called Pi after achieving some success from “Shock of Time”.

More recently in 2014 he had a solo show called Time Vivarium at Sean Kelly Gallery in New York City. (1) The show was a commentary on how history can be different based on the position and perspective of the person telling it. He frequently uses the perspective of regular people to be part of his work. He creates works using many different mediums and often-using symbolic subject matter. He will often acknowledge or reference key moments of history in his work. (2) He also will depict animals in order to symbolize different people, places or ideas. He captures many different themes in his work such as the past versus the present, and reality versus fantasy. He has had a number of solo exhibitions at prestigious museums and galleries in Asia, Europe and North America including the Hayward Gallery, The Metropolitan Museum of Art, and The Vancouver Art Gallery. His films have been shown at major film festivals, including the Torino Film Festival and The Seoul International Film Festival. In 2016 he was commissioned to do a piece called “Tales of Our Time” for the permanent collection of the Guggenheim Museum. (3) In 2010 he was received both the Best Young Artist award by the Chinese Contemporary Art Award and the Young Art Award by Taiwan Contemporary Art Link, and in 2013 he received the Arts Fellowship by Citivella Ranieri Foundation (Italy). (4), (5)

His major animation works include: "Some Actions Which Haven't Been Defined yet in the Revolution"(2011), "Clown's Revolution"(2010), "Beyond-ism"(2010), "21 KE (21 GRAMS)"(2010), "People's Republic of Zoo"(2009), "New China"(2008), "Coal Spell"(2008), "Requiem"(2007), "Heroes No Longer"(2007), "Lie"(2006), "Mythos"(2006), "Lie of Magician"(2005), "A War About Chinese Words"(2005). (6)

== Works ==
He produces a variety of different artworks that range from hand drawn conceptual animations to large scale experimental ink paintings. His artworks commonly displays characteristics of unnatural and dreamlike dimensions. Through his animations and large scale drawings he explores the dynamics between history and personal memory. He draws on subjects like childhood, memory, culture, history and politics for inspiration. He often displays these subjects in dystopian or dreamlike depictions. Sun has been quoted saying that he "want[s] to make fun of peoples failings", as modern history is only a small fragment in the grand scheme of time, and countries and politicians have a sense of importance. Sun Xun is largely inspired by his travels, and sees his work no longer confined to the politics of China.

== Maniac Universe (2018) ==
In July 2018, Sun Xun displayed a 40 meter long mixed media drawing on bark paper at the Museum of Contemporary Art Australia. The painting was commissioned by the MCA for this exhibit only. The piece is a mix of hand drawn animals, insects, and fish painted in ink and UV-A light. The room in which it was displayed was lit up in purple light, making the piece glow. The painting, like many of his other pieces, has an alternate universe style to it. The imagery is displayed to connect to a childlike imagination when looking up at the sky, leaving the viewer to decide their own meaning based on personal experience. The exhibit also featured his hand made woodcuts, and one of his animations "21 Grams". The single channel animation was meant to be an alternate view into the future. The exhibit at the MCA closed in October 2018.

== Personal life ==
He currently lives and works in Beijing.
