= Lara Schnitger =

American sculptor

Lara Schnitger (born 1969 in Haarlem, Netherlands) is a Dutch-American sculptor and painter, living and working in Los Angeles and Amsterdam. Schnitger studied at the Royal Academy of Art (The Hague) from 1987 to 1991 and spent a year on a residency at the Kitakyushu Centre for Contemporary Art in southern Japan.

Schnitger works in knitted and sewn textile sculptures, videos and photographs, and has produced a book about art created from mundane materials such as fabric, titled Lara Schnitger: Fragile Kingdom.

Schnitger has had over 40 solo exhibitions world wide and numerous group exhibitions. Her work has been shown internationally at galleries and museums such as Magasin 3 in Stockholm, the Chinese European Art Center in Xiamen, the Santa Monica Museum of Art, Kunstwerke in Berlin, the UCLA Hammer Museum in Los Angeles, P.S. 1 Contemporary Art Center in New York, The Power Plant in Toronto, and the Royal Academy in London. Schnitger's work is in the permanent collection of several museums including the Museum of Contemporary Art in Los Angeles and the Museum of Modern Art in New York. She participated in the Liverpool Biennial in 1999 and the Shanghai Biennial in 2002.
