= Kim Beom =

South Korean multimedia artist

Kim Beom (born 1963) is a South Korean multimedia artist.

== Education and early life ==
Kim Beom was born in 1963 in Seoul, Korea, to parents Kim Se-Choong (1928–1986), a sculptor known for various public monuments in Korea, and poet Kim Nam-Jo (b. 1927). He attended Seoul National University during South Korea's student democratization movement and obtained both a BFA and an MFA there in 1986 and 1988, respectively. Kim then moved to New York City where he completed a second MFA at the School of Visual Arts in 1991. He remained in New York until returning to South Korea in 1997. He now lives and works in Seoul.

== Work ==
Kim's drawings, sculptures, installations, videos, and artist books often use absurd situations and deadpan humor to evince themes involving pedagogy, education, animism, and the life of objects. In addition, Kim's work references the traditions of his native Korean culture to comment, in both a meditative and critical way, on contemporary Korean society's complex, often contradictory, relationship with the West.

Kim's early works were influenced by cartoons, the drawings of children and outsider artists, and traditional crafts like wood carving, paper cutting, and ceramics. Many of his drawings and paintings from the early 1990s feature aggressive subject matter such as "a hammer, an ax, a knife, a nail, sharp pieces of glass, a barbed-wire fence, and a weapon," and often exhibit "physical 'violence' inflicted on the material itself, through acts like cutting, tearing, folding over, and sewing the canvas." Curator Paola Morsiani has compared this work with Western artist Lucio Fontana's use of void in the 1950s–60s.

Morsiani also suggests that Kim's matchstick drawings from the mid-1990s, such as Bad Heads Fuck (1–4) (1995), collages of wooden matches on paper with pencil inscriptions, focus on the mass-produced object to "convey a narrative about the repression of individuality that [Kim] witnessed under dictatorial rule while growing up in Korea." In the drawings, stick figures "stand in for subjugated people" together corralled into forming collective assemblages and playing highly coordinated "games" that evoke the mass games the artist witnessed growing up in South Korea under repressive governments in the 1960s through the 1980s.

Kim describes his later series of satirical drawings, begun in 2002 and entitled "Perspectives and Blueprints," as "a sort of 'semiotic view on humankind.'" The series includes works on paper like A Wiring Diagram of a Lighthouse (2005), in which a video projection of propaganda replaces a guiding light out at sea, and School of Inversion (2009), which reiterates the artist's critique of repressive social norms in Korean society. The drawing delineates a blueprint of a school building showing classrooms from multiple conflicting perspectives, where "by third grade, students have learned to exist upside down." Other related drawings include A Draft of a Safe House for a Tyrant (2009) and A Design of an Immigration Bureau Complex on a Border Line (2005).

Kim's recent video works also deal with inversion and agency. Spectacle (2010) features the paradoxical event of an antelope chasing a cheetah, spoofing typical television footage of predatory animals in the wild, and Horse Riding Horse (After Eadweard Muybridge) (2008) similarly parodies Eadweard Muybridge's 1878 The Horse in Motion by replacing a horse's human rider with another horse.

Among Kim's most frequently exhibited works in recent years is his series "The Educated Objects" (2010), which comprises several sculptural installations and videos of the artist instructing inanimate objects such as rocks, a model ship, and various household items (e.g., a table fan and a bottle of dishwashing detergent). As critic Jennifer S. Li describes, "The loosely linked works' bizarre and unlikely tutorial and classroom scenarios mock and deride the structure and ideology behind educational systems." In Objects Being Taught They Are Nothing But Tools (2010), a collection of commonplace sundries are placed on miniature wooden chairs facing a blackboard. A video of the artist's torso plays on a screen at the front of the classroom tableaux and he delivers a lecture on the history of human rights, capitalism, and consumerism to his object-pupils, ultimately insisting they have no "essential value" outside of their economic use.

"The Educated Objects" continues the commentary on animism, education, and the "uncritical absorption of Western mores by Asian countries" of Kim's 1997 artist's book The Art of Transforming. This book comprises a series of prose poems instructing the reader on how to morph into various natural entities (both a sentient leopard, and non-sentient plant life and landscape elements), as well as man-made structures and commodities (a ladder; an air conditioner).

== Exhibitions ==
In 2012 Kim's work was the subject of the solo exhibition The School of Inversion at Hayward Gallery's Project Space, London. In the United States, Kim has had solo exhibitions at REDCAT Gallery, Los Angeles (Animalia, 2011) and the Cleveland Museum of Art (Objects Being Taught They are Nothing but Tools, 2010–11). Recent museum solo exhibitions in Korea include Kim Beom at Artsonje Center in 2010 and How to become a rock at the Leeum Museum of Art in 2023.

In addition to featuring prominently in recent surveys of contemporary art from Korea at venues like the Museo Tamayo Arte Contemporaneo in Mexico City, the Los Angeles County Museum of Art, and the Museum of Fine Arts in Houston, Kim's work has been included in such notable international exhibitions as the 2003 Istanbul Biennial, the 2005 Venice Biennale, Media City Seoul 2010, and the 9th Gwangju Biennale.

== Museum collections ==
Kim's work is included in the collections of the Museum of Fine Arts, Houston; the Cleveland Museum of Art; the Walker Art Center, Minneapolis in the United States; the Museum für Kommunikation, in Bern, Switzerland; the Seoul Museum of Art; the Ho-Am Art Museum, Artsonje Center; the Horim Museum in Seoul; the Museum of Modern Art, New York City; and the National Museum of Modern and Contemporary Art, in Gwachun, Korea.
