= Lisa Schiff =

American art advisor

- Born: Lisa Schiff; December 2, 1969 (age 56); Miami, Florida
- Occupations: art dealer, art advisor
- Employer: SFA Advisory (Schiff Fine Art)
- Children: 1
- Status: pled guilty to one count of wire fraud, multi-year scheme
- Conviction: wire fraud

Lisa Schiff (born December 2, 1969 in Miami) is an American art advisor and specialist in contemporary and modern art, based in New York. In October 2024, Schiff pleaded guilty in federal court in Manhattan to wire fraud, for stealing $6.5 million from clients. She was sentenced to two and a half years in prison on March 19, 2025.

She is the founder and president of SFA Advisory (Schiff Fine Art) with offices in New York, Los Angeles and London. Schiff Fine Art has filed for bankruptcy. Her former clients included individuals, corporations, foundations and institutions and the actor Leonardo DiCaprio and his Leonardo DiCaprio Foundation (LDF).

== Early life and education ==
Born in Miami, Florida, in 1969, Schiff was educated in Ann Arbor, Michigan, where she completed a Bachelor of Arts degree (art history and French) at the University of Michigan. She attended Columbia University's Reid Hall in Paris, finishing her undergraduate thesis while in residence there. She continued attending law school at the Faculte de Droit de Montpellier, France.

When Schiff returned to the United States, she completed a Master of Arts in art history at the University of Miami in 1990. Later, Schiff pursued a doctorate degree in art history at the Graduate Center at the City University of New York, where she worked closely with Carol Armstrong and achieved ABD (All But Dissertation) recognition.

== Career ==
Schiff held her first gallery position in Paris in 1991. As a graduate teaching fellow, Schiff taught at Hunter College, the College of Staten Island, and Nassau Community College. She spent several years working for the auction house Phillips, de Pury and Luxembourg in New York as assistant to the CEO and as manager of international operations. Before she launched SFA in 2002 she directed Edward Tyler Nahem Fine Art gallery in New York. Schiff also launched SFA offices in Los Angeles and London. She regularly consulted and fundraised for the LDF and curated several charity auctions for the foundation in Saint Tropez.

She is also founder and head of the LDF's Art & The Environment series, which presented Andrea Bowers and Tomas Sanchez at Pérez Art Museum Miami (PAMM), Porky Hefer at Design Miami and John Gerrard’s Solar Reserve at Los Angeles County Museum of Art (LACMA).

In 2013 Schiff co-founded the VIA (Visionary Initiatives in Art) Art Fund, which supports individual artists, curators, and small to mid-sized nonprofit organizations that work in the contemporary arts space.

In December 2017 the launch of her company One All Every was announced, which produces artist environmental protest billboards.

Schiff has curated numerous exhibitions including Open Source: Art at the Eclipse of Capitalism. Around this exhibition a panel discussion, featuring a key note speech from economic theorist Jeremy Rifkin, was hosted at the Palais de Tokyo in Paris.

As an expert on art Schiff has been quoted by the New York Times, the Financial Times, Bloomberg, the Guardian, and CNN. In addition, she lectures and sits on panels such as discussions on the relationship between art and environmentalism at Design Miami 2017 and Basel 2018. Her lecturing experiences include the Courtauld Institute in London, Institute of Contemporary Arts in London, the Art & Business Conference in New York, and Talking Galleries in Barcelona among others.

=== Lawsuits and closure of SFA ===
In May 2023, Richard Grossman, his spouse, and Candace Barasch sued Schiff for the proceeds from the sale of an Adrian Ghenie painting, claiming that Schiff had only paid them a small portion of what they were owed. Barasch and her husband filed a second suit, alleging misuse of funds intended for the purchase of artworks.

ARTnews reported that SFA Advisory appeared to have closed its New York offices 16 May 2023, and Artnet News said that a representative for the Cromwell Place gallery complex in London told them that SFA was no longer a member there. By 6 June 2023, Schiff had begun liquidating her business. Schiff filed for Chapter 7 bankruptcy protection in January 2024.

In August 2023, documents were released revealing more claims filed against Schiff by collectors and galleries for both money and missing artworks. Schiff pleaded guilty to charges of wire fraud in federal court in October 2024.

On March 19, 2025, Schiff was sentenced to 30 months in federal prison and two years of supervised release, and was ordered to forfeit nearly $6.5 million, as well as pay restitution of more than $9 million. Schiff is scheduled to report to prison on July 1.

== Family ==
Schiff has a son, of half-Danish descent, whose father is an artist. As of February 18, 2025, he is 12.

== Affiliations ==
- on the Artemis Council of the New Museum in New York
- on the Board of Trustees of the Swiss Institute Contemporary Art New York
- founding board member of LA><ART in Los Angeles
- co-founded VIA Art Fund
- on the Board of Trustees of the Bronx Museum of Art
- Rhizome Council
- Publishers Circle of Triple Canopy
- on the DIA Council of Art

== Publications ==
- 2003: Informed Consent: Information Production and Ideology, Scarecrow Press, ISBN 9780810839038
