= Rees (surname) =

Rees (/riːs/ REESS) is a very common Welsh name that traces back to the ancient Celts known as the Britons. The surname was first recorded in Carmarthenshire, and is derived from the personal name Rhys. Rhys is very common in Wales, and some parts of England. Rees is also a German name.

Notable individuals named Rees include the following:

- Abraham Rees (1743–1825), Welsh compiler of Rees's Cyclopaedia and botanist
- Alan Rees (1938–2024), British Formula One driver
- Albert E. Rees (1921–1992) American economist, presidential adviser, and Princeton provost.
- Albert E. Rees (actor) British 19th-century comic opera actor
- Aneurin Rees (1858–1932), Wales rugby union international
- Angharad Rees (1949–2012), British actress
- Betty Anne Rees (1943–2024), American actress
- Billy Rees (1924–1996), Welsh international footballer
- Brinley Rees (1919–2004), British classicist
- Celia Rees, British author
- Clara Rees (born 1859), American composer
- Clive Rees, Wales and British Lions rugby union international
- Conway Rees (1870–1932), Welsh rugby union international
- Coralie Clarke Rees (1908–1972), an Australian author
- Dai Rees (1913–1983), Welsh golfer
- Dai Rees (scientist) (1936–2021), British biochemist and science administrator
- Dan Rees (rugby), Welsh international rugby player
- David Rees (disambiguation), several people
- Don Rees, warden of Hugh Stewart Hall in the University of Nottingham for 29 years
- Eberhard Rees (1908–1998), rocketry pioneer and the second director of NASA's Marshall Space Flight Center
- Eleri Rees (born 1953), Welsh judge
- Elgan Rees, Wales and British Lions rugby union international
- Elmer Rees, British geometer
- Fernando Rees (born 1985), Brazilian auto racing driver
- Gareth Rees (disambiguation), multiple people, including:
  - Gareth Rees (cricketer) (born 1985), Welsh cricketer
  - Gareth Rees (motorsport commentator) (born 1969), Welsh motorsport commentator
  - Gareth Rees (rugby union) (born 1967), former Canadian rugby player
- Gavin Rees (born 1980), Welsh professional boxer
- Geraint Rees, British neurologist and neuroscientist
- Goronwy Rees (1909–1979), Welsh journalist, academician, memoirist, and Soviet spy
- Grover J. Rees III (born 1951), American judge and diplomat
- Jason Rees (born 1969), Welsh footballer
- Jean Rees (1914–2004), British artist
- Jeremy Rees (1937–2003), British arts administrator
- Jerry Rees, U.S. animator and film director
- John Rees (disambiguation), multiple people, including:
  - John Rees (activist) (born 1957), British political musician
  - John Rees (journalist), American journalist
  - John David Rees (1854–1922), colonial administrator in British India and Member of Parliament
  - John Rees (musician) (1857–1949), Welsh musician
  - John Rawlings Rees (1890–1969), British psychiatrist
- Jonathan Rees, British private investigator
- Jonathan Rees, an actor professionally known as Greg Ellis
- Idwal Rees (1910–1991), Wales rugby union captain
- Ivor Rees (1893–1967), Welsh soldier and recipient of the Victoria Cross
- Katie Rees, a former American beauty queen
- Ken Rees (1944–2020), Welsh television journalist
- Laurence Rees (born 1957), British historian, author and documentary filmmaker
- Leighton Rees (1940–2003), Welsh darts player
- Lionel Wilmot Brabazon Rees (1884–1955), Welsh World War I flying ace
- Lloyd Rees (1895–1988), Australian landscape painter
- Martin Rees, Baron Rees of Ludlow (born 1942), British Astronomer Royal
- Matt Rees, (born 1967) Welsh novelist
- Matthew Rees (born 1980), Wales and British Lions rugby union international
- Merlyn Rees (1920–2006), British Labour party politician and minister
- Milsom Rees (1866–1952), Welsh surgeon
- Nathan Rees, (born 1968) Australian politician with the Labor Party, and Premier of New South Wales
- Nigel Rees (born 1944), English writer and broadcaster
- Nigel Rees (footballer) (born 1953), Welsh footballer
- Norman Rees (1939–2023), Welsh television journalist
- Norman J. Rees (c. 1906 – 1976), double agent for USSR and FBI
- Peter Rees (1926–2008), British Conservative party politician
- Paul Rees (born 1986), British racing driver
- Robert Rees (disambiguation), several people
- Ronnie Rees, Welsh international footballer
- Roger Rees (1944–2015), Welsh actor
- Ronnie Rees (born 1944), Welsh footballer
- Stuart Rees, director of the Sydney Peace Foundation
- Thomas Rees (disambiguation), multiple people, including:
  - Thomas Rees (Unitarian minister) (1777–1864), Welsh Unitarian minister and scholar
  - Thomas Rees (Twm Carnabwth) (c. 1806–1876; also known as Twm Carnabwth), Welsh leader of the Rebecca Riots
  - Thomas Rees (Congregational minister) (1815–1885), Welsh Congregationalist minister
  - Thomas Ifor Rees (1890–1977), Welsh diplomat and translator
  - Tom Rees (rugby union, born 1984) (born 1984), English rugby union player
  - Tommy Rees (1904–1968), Welsh dual-code rugby player
  - Thomas Wynford Rees (1898–1959), British soldier in the British Indian Army
- William Rees (disambiguation), several people
- Winifred Rees (1900-1976), British author, composer, and organist

== See also ==
- Rees (disambiguation)
- Reece (disambiguation)
- Reese (disambiguation)
- Rees-Jones
- Rees-Mogg
- Rhys
