= Ryze (disambiguation) =

Ryze was a social networking website connecting business professionals, especially entrepreneurs.

Ryze may also refer to:

- Ryze Trampoline Parks, an international chain of trampoline and extreme sports parks
- Ryze (League of Legends), a co-founder of Riot Games, the developer of League of Legends

== See also ==
- Ryse: Son of Rome, a 2013 video game developed by Crytek
- Ryzen, a brand of microprocessors
- Terra Ryzing, the first ring name of professional wrestler Paul Michael Levesque, better known by the ring name Triple H
- Rhys (name)
- Rhyse (disambiguation)
- Rhyze (band)
- Rice (disambiguation)
- Rise (disambiguation)
- Rize (disambiguation)
- Ryce (surname)
- Rys (disambiguation)
