= Reece (name) =

- Gender: Primarily male
- Language: English

Origin
- Languages: English, Welsh
- Origin: Anglicisation of Rhys
- Meaning: "ardent" or "fiery"
- Region of origin: Wales

Other names
- Variant forms: Reese; Rhys

Reece is a given name and surname that derives from the Welsh name Rhys. Notable people with the name include:

== Surname ==
- Alan Reece (1927–2012), English engineer and entrepreneur
- Alex Reece, British musician
- Alicia Reece (born 1971), American politician
- Andy Reece (born 1962), English footballer
- Angel Katherine Reece, better known as Hailey Hatred (born 1983), American professional wrestler
- B. Carroll Reece (1889–1961), American politician
- Barbara Massey Reece (born 1942), American politician
- Beasley Reece (born 1954), American football player
- Bessie Reece
- Bob Reece (born 1951), American baseball player
- Brian Reece (1913–1962), English actor
- Byron Herbert Reece (1917–1958), American author
- Caley Reece (born 1979), Australian kickboxer
- Carlton Reece (1915–1963), Guyanese cricketer
- Carmen Reece, British singer, songwriter, musician and producer
- Charlie Reece (born 1989), English footballer
- Christopher Reece (born 1959), American musician
- Cleo Reece, activist and filmmaker
- Courtenay Reece (1899–1984), Barbadian first-class cricketer and cricket umpire
- Damon Reece (born 1967), English drummer
- Danny Reece (born 1955), American football player
- Dave Reece (born 1948), American ice hockeyplayer
- David Reece, American singer
- Dizzy Reece (born 1931), Jamaican-born hard bop jazz trumpeter
- Don Reece (1919–1992), American football player
- Donald James Reece (born 1934), Emeritus Archbishop of the Roman Catholic Archdiocese of Kingston in Jamaica
- Eric Reece (1909–1999), Premier of Tasmania
- Erik Reece, American writer
- Eryn Reece, American bartender
- Florence Reece (1900–1986), American social activist, poet, and folksong writer
- Gabrielle Reece (born 1970), American volleyball player and fashion model
- Geoff Reece (born 1952), American football player
- Gerald Reece (1897–1985), British writer and colonial administrator
- Gil Reece (1942–2003), Welsh international footballer
- Gordon Reece (1929–2001), British journalist and television producer
- Jack Reece (1927–1966), New Zealand cricketer
- James Reece (disambiguation)
- Jane Reece (born 1944), American geneticist
- Jason Reece (born 1971), American drummer and vocalist
- Jimmy Reece (1929–1958), American racecar driver
- John Reece (born 1957), British businessman
- Kensley Reece (born 1945), former Barbadian cyclist
- Lewis Reece (born 1991), Welsh rugby league footballer
- Louise Goff Reece (1898–1970), American politician
- Luis Reece (born 1990), English cricketer
- Marcel Reece (born 1985), American football player
- Marilyn Jorgenson Reece (1926–2004), American civil engineer
- Maynard Reece (1920–2020), American artist
- Nicholas Reece (born 1974), Australian politician and policy activist
- Paul Reece (born 1968), English footballer
- Richard Reece (born 1939), numismatist and academic
- Richard Reece (physician) (1775–1831), British physician
- Sevu Reece (born 1997), Fiji-born, New Zealand rugby union player
- Shakera Reece (born 1988), Barbadian sprinter
- Skeena Reece (born 1974), Canadian First Nations artist
- Skeeter Reece (born 1950 or 1951), American clown
- Spencer Reece, poet and presbyter
- Stephanie Reece (born 1970), American tennis player
- Travis Reece (born 1975), American football player
- William Reece (1856–1930), mayor of Christchurch, New Zealand
- William Lewis Reece (born 1959), American serial killer

== Given name ==
- Reece Beckles-Richards (born 1995), Antigua and Barbudan international footballer
- Reece Beekman (born 2001), American college basketball player
- Reece Bellotti (born 1990), English boxer
- Reece Blayney (born 1985), Australian rugby league footballer
- Reece Boughton (born 1995), English rugby union player
- Reece Brown (footballer, born 1991), English footballer
- Reece Brown (footballer, born 1996), English footballer
- Reece Burke (born 1996), English footballer
- Reece Caira (born 1993), Australian footballer
- Reece Caudle (1888–1955), American politician
- Reece Cole (born 1998), English footballer
- Reece Conca (born 1992), Australian rules footballer
- Reece Connolly (born 1992), English footballer
- Reece Crowther (born 1988), Australian footballer
- Reece Deakin (born 1996), Welsh footballer
- Reece Dinsdale (born 1959), English actor and director
- Reece Donaldson (born 1994), Scottish footballer
- Reece Douglas (born 1994), English actor
- Reece Farnhill (born 1997), English boxer
- Reece Fielding (born 1998), English footballer
- Reece Flanagan (born 1994), English footballer
- Reece Gaines (born 1981), American basketball player and coach
- Reece Gaskell (born 2001), English footballer
- Reece Gray (born 1992), English footballer
- Reece Grego-Cox (born 1996), English footballer
- Reece Hales (born 1995), English footballer
- Reece Hall-Johnson (born 1995), English footballer
- Reece Hands (born 1993), English footballer
- Reece Hewat (born 1995), South African-born Australian rugby union player
- Reece Hodge (born 1994), Australian rugby union player
- Reece Hoffman (born 2001), Australian rugby league footballer
- Reece Humphrey (born 1986), American freestyle wrestler
- Reece Hussain (born 1995), English cricketer
- Reece Hutchinson (born 2000), English footballer
- Reece James (disambiguation)
  - Reece James (footballer, born 1993), English footballer
  - Reece James (born 1999), English footballer
- Reece Jones (disambiguation), several people
  - Reece Jones (artist) (born 1976), British artist
  - Reece Jones (footballer) (born 1992), Welsh international footballer
  - Reece Jones (geographer) (born 1976), American political geographer
- Reece Kelly, Irish cricketer
- Reece Kershaw, Commissioner of the Australian Federal Police
- Reece Lyne (born 1992), English rugby league footballer
- Reece Lyon (born 2000), Scottish footballer
- Reece MacMillan (born 1996), English boxer
- Reece Marshall (born 1994), rugby union player
- Reece Mastin, Australian singer; see Reece Mastin
- Reece McAlear (born 2002), Scottish footballer
- Reece McFadden (born 1995), Scottish boxer
- Reece McGinley (born 2000), Northern Irish footballer
- Reece Mitchell (born 1995), English footballer
- Reece Morrison (born 1945), American football player
- Reece Mould (born 1994), English boxer
- Reece Noi (born 1988), British actor and writer
- Reece Oxford (born 1998), English footballer
- Reece Painter, American politician
- Reece Papuni (born 1987), light heavyweight boxer
- Reece Prescod (born 1996), British sprinter
- Reece Ritchie (born 1986), English actor
- Reece Robinson (born 1987), Lebanon international rugby league footballer
- Reece Robson (born 1998), Australian rugby league footballer
- Reece Scarlett (born 1993), Canadian ice hockey player
- Reece Shearsmith (born 1969), British comedian
- Reece Shipley (1921–1998), American country musician
- Reece Simmonds (born 1980), Australian rugby league footballer
- Reece Styche (born 1989), English footballer
- Reece Joseph Staunton (born 2001), footballer
- Reece Thompson (born 1988), Canadian actor
- Reece Thompson (footballer) (born 1993), English footballer
- Reece Tollenaere (born 1977), Australian footballer
- Reece Topley (born 1994), English international cricketer)
- Reece Ushijima (born 2003), Japanese-American racing driver
- Reece Vander Zee (born 2005), American football player
- Reece Wabara (born 1991), English businessman and footballer
- Reece Waldock, Australian public servant
- Reece Webb-Foster (born 1998), English footballer
- Reece Whitby (born 1964), Australian politician
- Reece Whitley (born 2000), American competitive swimmer
- Reece Willcox (born 1994), Canadian ice hockey player
- Reece Williams (born 1985), Australian rugby league footballer and referee
- Reece Williams (cricketer) (born 1988), South African cricketer
- Reece Willison (born 1999), Scottish footballer
- Reece Wilson (born 1996), Scottish downhill mountain biker
- Reece Young (born 1979), New Zealand Test cricketer

== Other names ==
- Uncle Reece, stage name of Maurice Hicks Jr. (born 1984), American musician

== See also ==
- Rees (surname)
- Reese (given name)
