= Ryce =

Ryce is a surname variant of the Welsh name Rhys.

People with the name include:

- Claudine Dianne Ryce (1942–2009), missing children's advocate, mother of Samuel James Ryce
- Griffith Ryce (1478–1521), Welsh nobleman
- Mark Ryce, guitarist of The Big Dish (band)
- Samuel James Ryce (1985–1996), son of Claudine Dianne Ryce, victim of killer Juan Carlos Chavez
- Joel Ryce-Menuhin (1933–1988), American pianist
- Jamal Campbell-Ryce (born 1983), British soccer player

== See also ==
- Rhyce Shaw (born 1981) Australian rules football player
- Reece (disambiguation)
- Reese (disambiguation)
- Rees (disambiguation)
- Rhees (disambiguation)
- Reis (disambiguation)
- Rice (disambiguation)
- Rise (disambiguation)
- Rys (disambiguation)
