= City and Guilds of London Art School =

Art school in London, England

Coordinates: 51°29′14″N 0°06′26″W

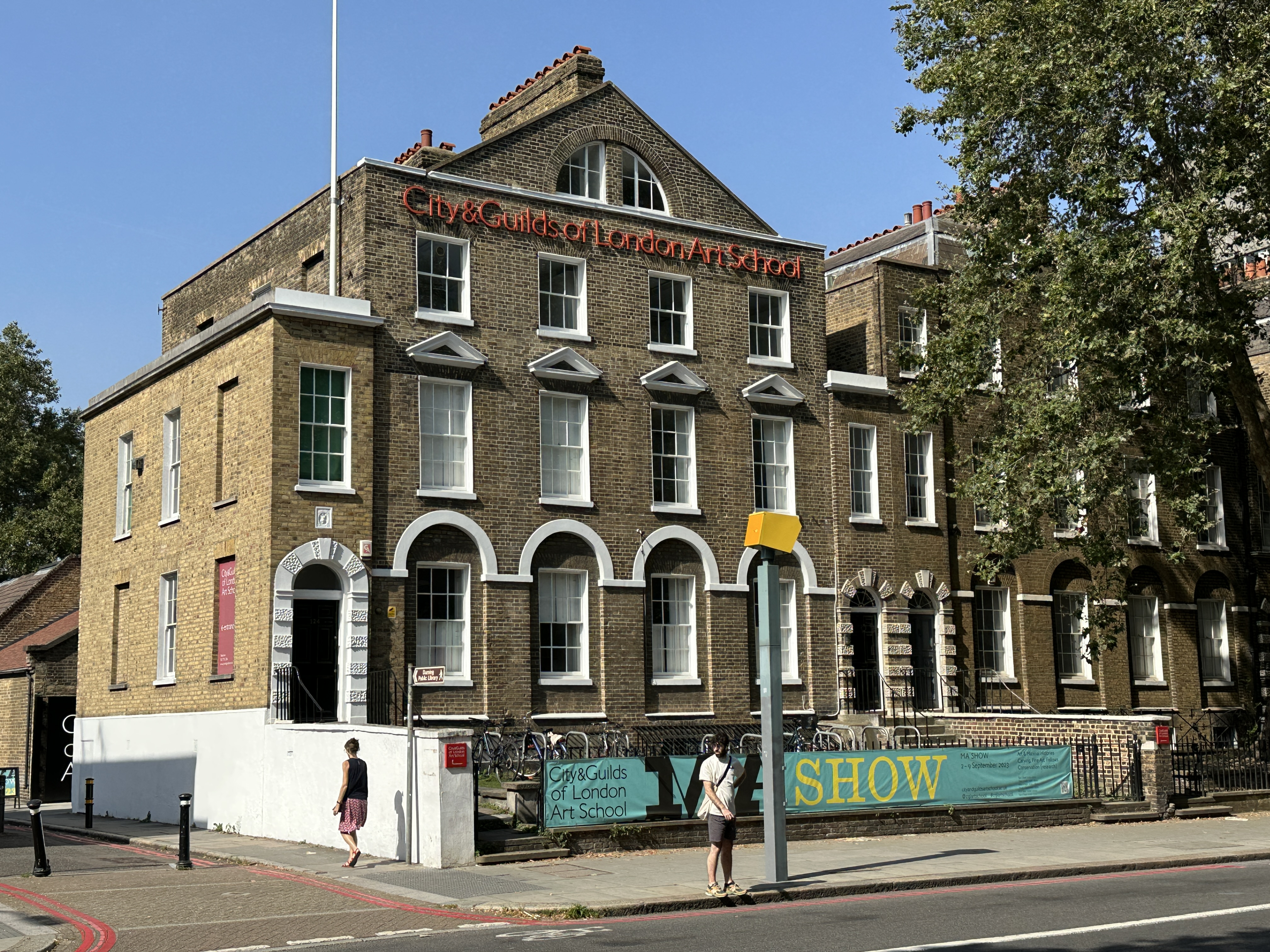
- Type: Charity
- Established: 1854; 172 years ago as the Lambeth School of Art
- Affiliations: Ravensbourne, Birmingham City University, University of the Arts London, City & Guilds of London Institute
- Principal: Dr Lois Rowe
- Location: London, United Kingdom
- Campus: Kennington
- Website: www.cityandguildsartschool.ac.uk

Founded in 1854 as the Lambeth School of Art, the City and Guilds of London Art School is a small specialist art college located in central London, England. Originally founded as a government art school, it is now an independent, not-for-profit charity, and is one of the country's longest established art schools. It offers courses ranging from art and design Foundation, through to BA (Hons) undergraduate degrees and MA postgraduate courses in fine art, carving, conservation, and art histories. In addition, it offers the only undergraduate and postgraduate degrees in Britain in stone and wood carving: architectural stone and woodcarving and gilding.

The Art School is housed in a row of Georgian buildings in London's Kennington district, as well as in an adjoining converted warehouse building close to the south bank of the river Thames.

== History ==
=== Foundation in the 19th century ===
The City and Guilds of London Art School was founded in 1854 by the Reverend Robert Gregory under the name Lambeth School of Art. It began as a night school in rooms occupied during the day by a National School in his south London parish of St Mary the Less. With the support of Henry Cole Director of the South Kensington Museum, who supplied Gregory with teachers, the school flourished and became a leader in the provision of instruction in applied art and design to working artisans, many of whom were employed by local manufacturing firms, including Doulton's and Farmer and Brindley. The rapid expansion of the school led to the need for new premises, and in 1860 Albert, Prince of Wales (Edward VII) laid the foundation stone for new premises in Millers Lane, built on the site of the Vauxhall Gardens as part of a redevelopment that included St Peter's church. The buildings are still standing, although the road is now called St Oswald's Place.

=== Development under John Sparkes ===
In 1857 John Charles Lewis Sparkes started teaching at the art school, soon becoming its Headmaster. Under Sparkes City and Guilds of London Art School was at the forefront of opposition to the monopoly claimed by the Royal Academy of Arts on the teaching of fine art practices, particularly drawing from the human figure. An attempt had been made to resolve this conflict in 1852, with the introduction by the British Government of the National Course on Instruction for art and design education, which was in effect a national curriculum for art training. This allowed for some elements of drawing to be taught, but within a broader curriculum that stressed the teaching of techniques to aid workers in artisan manufacturing industries rather than the training of artists.

In the case of City and Guilds of London Art School it was suggested at the time that Sparkes was ignoring the National Course on Instruction and teaching his students to be fine artists, particularly in 1865, when students from the art school won three medals at the annual awards handed out by the Royal Academy of Arts, and again in 1867 when its students won three out of ten of the gold medals for art awarded by the Government, along with four silver medals awarded annually by the Royal Academy of Arts, and a bronze medal at the International Exposition held that year in Paris. Certainly Sparkes and his colleagues at City and Guilds of London Art School ignored the general prohibition on life drawing being taught outside the Royal Academy of Arts, and the success of Sparkes's students at City and Guilds of London Art School in fine art competitions can be traced to this willingness by Sparkes to ignore regulations he believed were wrong.

This radicalism in Sparkes can also be seen in his concern for the art and design tutors working both at City and Guilds of London Art School and elsewhere in Britain. In the 1860s a block grant was given by the British Government to the South Kensington Government School of Design for teachers' pay and this was then redistributed to other art schools across the country. As well as being widely considered an insufficient sum in the first place, the Government School of Design was accused by people such as Sparkes of holding on to too much of the money leading to the payment of what were called starvation wages at other art schools. Sparkes, in particular, was instrumental in campaigning for an increase in these wages, through both direct appeals to parliament and the establishment of the first national union of art teachers, the Association of Art Masters, in 1863.

=== Connection to Doulton's Pottery, Farmer and Brindley and other companies ===
Recognising the limitations of government patronage of art schools, Sparkes cultivated a number of connections between the City and Guilds of London Art School and local manufacturing industries which would lead ultimately to City and Guilds of London Art School attaining the independent status it has today. One of the most notable of these was with Henry Doulton whose pottery factory, later known as Royal Doulton, was located near to the City and Guilds of London Art School.

In 1863 Doulton joined the school's board of management and the following year he gave the school its first commission, for a terracotta frieze for his factory's new extension. Following on from this Doulton was a strong supporter and promoter of the art school's activities, including exhibiting experimental works by students at the 1867 Paris Exhibition and at the 1871 London Exhibition.

From about 1869, Doulton and his staff helped the art school to develop a curriculum that trained students for the pottery trade, and to carry out design work for Doulton. This collaboration provided Doulton's with a supply of higher-quality artwork for its trade, and gave students at Lambeth School of Art employment opportunities, and many noted English modellers and sculptors of the late nineteenth century owe their careers to this partnership.

The close connection between the art school and Doulton's meant that the ethos of City and Guilds of London School of Art was based, from very early days, on a belief in a strong connection between the fine arts, craft and design. Consequently, its students and teachers became associated with the Arts and Crafts movement, and to some extent the Art Nouveau movement.

In addition to Doulton's, Sparkes also cultivated contacts with other local craft trade companies, one of the most notable of which was Mssrs Farmer and Brindley, a Lambeth-based architectural stone carving and terra-cotta company. As with Doulton's, a number of apprentices at Farmer and Brindley augmented their training with study at the Art School. This included the sculptors Charles John Allen (1862–1956), Harry Bates (1850–1899) and Nathaniel Hitch (1846–1936), and others, who became prominent sculptors in the Victorian and Edwardian periods.

Individuals from other companies were also involved in teaching at the art school, most notably John Henry Dearle in the 1880s, who was one of the chief designers for William Morris and Morris and Co.

=== City and Guilds Institute and City Livery Companies ===
In 1878 Sparkes secured funding in the art school of the newly founded City and Guilds of London Institute which also ran one of the precursor institutions to Imperial College London, the CGLI Central Technical College. The new backing secured the financial future of the art school without the strings attached to government funding. Under the new arrangement, the art school moved to new buildings in Kennington Park Road in Lambeth, which it still occupies, and was renamed the South London Technical School of Art. In 1932 it changed its name to the City and Guilds of London Institute Kennington and Lambeth Art School, reflecting the historical and continued support of the city of London Livery Companies. This was shortened in 1938 to the City and Guilds of London Art School. The formal link between the parent body, the City and Guilds Institute, and the City and Guilds of London Art School was ended in 1971, when the art school became and independent trust.

=== 20th and 21st centuries ===
Graduates of the Art School were involved in some of the leading social and political movements of the early twentieth century, including Clemence Housman and Laurence Housman, who co-founded, in 1909, a society for artists who supported the Suffragette Movement, called the Suffrage Atelier. Laurence Housman later went on to found the radical bookshop, which still bears his name, located in Caledonian Road, near London's King's Cross railway station.

After the Second World War, new restoration and carving courses were established at the Art School to train people for the restoration of London's war-damaged buildings. However, during the 1960s the art school also developed a fine art programme, although it still maintained and strengthened its programmes in restoration and carving. This resulted in the Art School evolving into both a school for fine art education, and a unique specialist training centre for the education of restorers and conservators of architectural stone and wood work.

In 1971 the Art School became an independent charitable trust, with the new Deed of Incorporation signed by Geoffrey Agnew (chairman of the art gallery Thomas Agnew & Sons), Sir Colin Skelton Anderson (Provost of the Royal College of Art), Sir John Betjeman (poet), Adrian Maurice Daintrey (artist), Gilbert Samuel (Lord Mayor of London), Charles Wheeler (sculptor and Former President of the Royal Academy), and Carel Weight (artist), amongst others. Support also came from artists such as Henry Moore and Graham Sutherland.

In 1997 and 1998 the Fine Art Painting, Sculpture and Conservation courses were validated at undergraduate BA (Hons) level. In 2000 the MA course in Fine Art was validated by the University of Central England (now Birmingham City University).

In a 2008 letter to the Observer newspaper and Art Monthly by Graham Crowley, former Professor of the Royal College of Art, the City & Guilds of London Art School's Fine Art Department was singled out for its "magnificent job" in "maintaining the transformative power and joy of education through art".

In 2009 Booker Prize shortlisted writer Tibor Fischer became the Royal Literary Fund writing fellow at the City and Guilds of London Art School.

In April 2011 the magazine Modern Painters surveyed art world professionals to create a list of the top ten British art schools, resulting in the City and Guilds of London Art School coming third after the Royal College of Art and the Royal Academy.

Since 2018 art school's undergraduate and postgraduate degree courses have been validated by Ravensbourne.

== Current departments ==
The current Principal, since 2022, is Dr Lois Rowe.

The Foundation Department is currently led by Acting Course Leader Joshua Uvieghara. The department teaches the UAL Foundation Course syllabus to prepare students to make applications to undergraduate art and design programmes at universities and art schools. Other tutors include Kim Amis, Andrea Barber, Niamh Clancy, Gary Colclough, Alex Hough, Lucy Le Feuvre, Nicholas Middleton, Daniel Mifsud, Emma Montague, Jacky Oliver and Sage Townsend.

The Fine Art Department is currently led by Acting Course Leader Andy Bannister, and consists of BA (Hons) Fine Art, GradDip Arts: Fine Art and MA Fine Art. A range of contemporary artists teach at the Art School including Kiera Bennett, Kate Dunn, Andrew Grassie, Jane Hayes Greenwood, James Jessop, Reece Jones, Hugh Mendes, Alex Gene Morrison, Kate Palmer, Charley Peters, Candida Powell-Williams, Frances Richardson, Jack Southern, Amikam Toren, and Tom Worsford.

The Carving Department consists of DipHE/BA (Hons) Carving: Woodcarving & Gilding, DipHE/BA (Hons) Carving: Architectural Stone, Graduate Diploma Arts: Carving and PgDip/MA Carving. The Department is led by Tom Young, who is supported by professional carvers in stone and wood including Tom Ball, Richard Barnes, Nina Bilbey, Sarah Davis, Mark Frith, Paul Jakeman, Takako Jin, Richard Kindersley, Tom Merrett, and Ghislain Puget, alongside Kim Amis who teaches modelling and Diane Magee who runs the Drawing Studio.

The Conservation Department led by Dr Marina Sokhan, comprises DipHE/BA (Hons) Conservation: Books & Paper, DipHE/BA Conservation: Stone, Wood & Decorative Surfaces, GradDip Arts: Conservation and MA Conservation. The Department has a number of specialist tutors including Gerry Alabone ACR, Kim Amis, Louise Ashon, Sophie Barton ACR, Peter Bennett, James Bloxam, Amanda Brannan, Dr Tracey Chaplin, Edward Cheese ACR, Sarah Davis, Jennifer Dinsmore ACR, Rosella Garavaglia, Graeme Gardiner ACR, Judith Gowland ACR, Christopher Harvey, Sarah Healey-Dilkes ACR, Hugi Hicyilmaz, Joel Hopkinson, Rian Kanduth, Katy Lithgow ACR, Dr Naomi Luxford ACR, Dana Melchar, Bridget Mitchell ACR, Richard Nichols ACR, Dr David Peggie, Cheryl Porter, Dr Joanna Russell ACR, Alex Schouvaloff, Alison Seed ACR, Vanessa Simeoni ACR, Victoria Stevens ACR, Shaun Thompson, and Piers Townshend ACR.

The Art Histories Department is led by Thomas Groves and provides art historical, contextual and theoretical instruction to students in all the practical departments at the Art School. In addition to Thomas Groves, tutors include Dr Oriana Fox, John Goodall, Viv Lawes, Dr Nigel Llewellyn, Dr Michael Paraskos, Jaimini Patel, Harrison Pearce, Dr Matthew Rowe, Dr Jon Shaw, Dr Rebecca Sykes, and Laura White.

The Art School works with a network of institutions and individuals, including the Victoria & Albert Museum, the Museum of London, the British Museum and Tate Modern.

== Notable teachers and lecturers ==
- Basil Beattie
- Kiera Bennett
- Ralph Beyer
- Emma Biggs
- Sonia Boyce
- Rodney Joseph Burn
- James Butler
- Philip Connard
- Matthew Collings
- Aimé-Jules Dalou
- Sir Roger de Grey (Principal 1973–1995)
- Bernard Dunstan
- Michael Fell
- Tibor Fischer (RLF Writing Fellow 2009)
- Elizabeth Fitzgerald (Principal)
- William Silver Frith
- Andrew Grassie
- Charles Sargeant Jagger
- James Jessop
- Jasper Joffe
- Alfred Garth Jones
- Reece Jones
- Michael Kenny (Principal 1995–1999)
- Ben Levene
- Hew Locke
- Robin Mason
- Alex Gene Morrison
- Tamiko O'Brien (Principal 2014–2022)
- Dick Onians
- Michael Paraskos
- Benedict Read
- Charles Ricketts
- John Roberts
- William Sharpington (also an alumnus)
- John Charles Lewis Sparkes
- William Wheeler
- Amikam Toren
