= Rhys Jones =

Rhys Jones or variation, may refer to:

== Given and last name ==
- Rhys Jones (archaeologist) (1941–2001), Welsh-Australian archaeologist
- Rhys Jones (rugby union) (born 1987), Welsh rugby union player
- Murder of Rhys Jones, an 11-year-old shot dead in Liverpool, 2007
- Rhys Jones (soldier) (born 1960), New Zealand Lieutenant General
- Rhys Jones (mountaineer) (born 1986), English mountaineer
- Rhys Jones (athlete) (born 1994), Paralympic athlete from Wales
- Rhys Parry Jones, Welsh actor
- Rhys Jones (Australian engineer)
- Rhys James, English comedian who was born Rhys Jones

With a variant spelling

- Reece Jones (footballer) (born 1992), Welsh footballer
- Reece Jones (artist) (born 1976), British artist
- Reece Jones (geographer) (born 1976), American political geographer
- Rees Jones (born 1941), golf course architect

== Surnamed ==
- David Rhys-Jones (born 1962), Australian rules footballer
- Sophie Rhys-Jones (born 1965), the Duchess of Edinburgh

With a variant spelling

- Trevor Rees-Jones (businessman) (born 1951), American attorney, business executive and philanthropist
- Trevor Rees-Jones (bodyguard) (born 1968), bodyguard to Diana, Princess of Wales when she died

== Part of the name ==
- Adam Rhys Jones (born 1981), Welsh rugby union player
- Griff Rhys Jones (born 1953), British comedian
- Griffith Rhys Jones (1834–1897), Welsh choir conductor

== See also ==
- Jones (disambiguation)
- Reece (disambiguation)
- Reese (disambiguation)
- Rees (disambiguation)
- Rhees (disambiguation)
- Rhys (name)
