= RIE =

RIE may refer to:

- Reactive-ion etching, as an acronym
- Rie, a Japanese and Dutch given name
- The Royal Infirmary of Edinburgh, the oldest voluntary hospital in Edinburgh, United Kingdom
- Resources for Infant Educarers, as an acronym

== See also ==
- RE (disambiguation)
- RI (disambiguation)
- Rye (disambiguation)
- Ree (disambiguation)
- Rhee (disambiguation)
