= Evandar =

Evandar may refer to:

== Fictional Characters ==
- King Evandar, a character in the Inheritance Cycle book series
- Evandar, a character in the Deverry Cycle book series
