= Nobiliary particle =

Personal name component indicating nobility

A nobiliary particle is a type of onomastic particle used in a surname or family name in many Western cultures to signal the nobility of a family. The particle used varies depending on the country, language and period of time. In some languages, it is the same as a regular prepositional particle that was used in the creation of many surnames. In some countries, it became customary to distinguish the nobiliary particle from the regular one by a different spelling, although in other countries these conventions did not arise, occasionally resulting in ambiguity. The nobiliary particle can often be omitted in everyday speech or certain contexts.

== Denmark and Norway ==
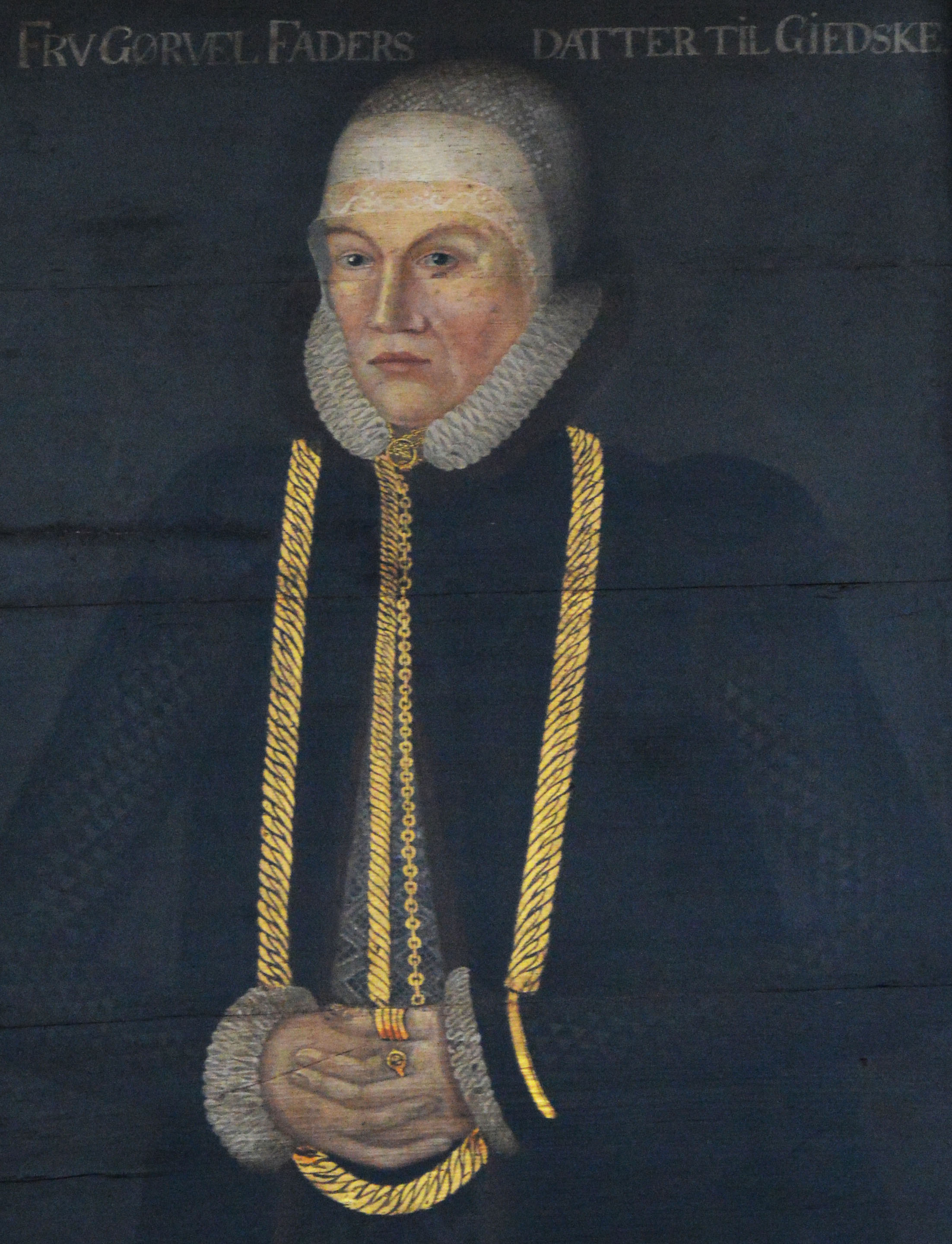
Gørvel Fadersdotter of Giske (1517–1605). In the painting: 'Fru Gørvel Fadersdatter til Giedske'

In Denmark and Norway, there is a distinction between (1) nobiliary particles in family names and (2) prepositions denoting an individual person's place of residence.

Nobiliary particles like af, von, and de (English: of) are integrated parts of family names. The use of particles was not a particular privilege for the nobility. On the other hand, particles were almost exclusively used by and associated with them. Especially in the late 17th and 18th centuries, a person would often receive a particle along with his or her old or new family name when ennobled. Examples are families like de Gyldenpalm (lit. 'of Goldenpalm') and von Munthe af Morgenstierne (lit. 'of Munthe of Morningstar'). Otherwise, particles would arrive together with immigrants. Examples are families like von Ahnen. Prominent non-noble families having used particles are von Cappelen, von der Lippe, and de Créqui dit la Roche.

The preposition til (English: to, but translates as of; comparable with German zu) is placed behind a person's full name in order to denote his or her place of residence, for example Sigurd Jonsson til Sudreim.

== France ==
In France—and in England, largely as a result of the Norman Conquest—the particle de precedes a nom de terre ('name of land') in many families of the French nobility: for example, Maximilien de Béthune. A few do not have this particle: for example, Pierre Séguier, Lord Chancellor of France. The particle can also be du ('of the' in the masculine form, analogous to de la in the feminine), d' (used, per the rules of orthography, when the nom de terre begins with a vowel; for example, Ferdinand d'Orléans), or des ('of the' in the plural). In French, de indicates a link between the land and a person—either landlord or peasant.

The nobleman was always designated escuyer, for 'squire' in English form (dapifer in Latin), or chevalier for 'knight' (equites in Latin). Only knights were designated by the spoken style monseigneur or messire for 'sir' (dominus in Latin), as, for example, "monseigneur Bertrand du Guesclin, chevalier"—in English form, "Sir Bertrand du Guesclin, knight".

By convention, surnames with the non-noble use of the particle de are spelled as a single word (e.g., "Pierre Dupont"), though many such surnames conserved the de as a separate word.

Since the sixteenth century, surnames among the French nobility have often been composed of a combination of patronymic names, titles, or noms de terres ('names of lands' or estates) joined by the preposition de, as in "Charles Maurice de Talleyrand-Périgord". The use of this particle began to be an essential appearance of nobility. Following the end of the Kingdom of France, however, the use of de did not invariably denote nobility. In the eighteenth and nineteenth centuries, some middle-class families simply adopted the particle without being ennobled; Maximilien Robespierre's family, for example, used the particle for some generations.

== Germany and Austria ==
In Germany and Austria, von (descending from) or zu (resident at) generally precedes the surname of a noble family (in, for example, the names of Alexander von Humboldt and Gottfried Heinrich Graf zu Pappenheim). If it is justified, they can be used together (von und zu): the ruler of Liechtenstein as of 2022, for example, is Johannes Adam Ferdinand Alois Josef Maria Marko d'Aviano Pius von und zu Liechtenstein.

In some cases – although unusually, and perhaps introduced to distinguish collateral branches of the same family – these more common particles might be supplemented with auf (i.e., residing at yet another place different from the one zu refers to and meaning [up]on in English): Von A-dynasty/place, zu B-town, auf C-ville/location/residence. Rarer variants are "von der", "von dem", "zum", "zur", etc.

As in France and Spain, not all noble families use a nobiliary particle. The names of the most ancient nobility, the Uradel, but also names of some old untitled nobility, often do not contain either von or zu, such as Grote, Knigge or Vincke. Conversely, the prefix von occurs in the names of 200 to 300 non-noble families, much like van in the Netherlands.

Especially in northwestern Germany, e.g. Bremen, Hamburg, Holstein, Lower Saxony, Schleswig, Westphalia, and in German-speaking Switzerland, the particles von, zu, etc., may be elements in non-noble surnames and usually designate the place of origin. In Austria and Bavaria, non-noble surnames containing von were widely altered by compounding it to the main surname element in the 19th century, such as von Werden → Vonwerden.

== Hungary ==
In the Medieval Kingdom of Hungary Latin was the official language in which royal decrees and all kinds of legal documents were issued. Hungarian noble families used the nobiliary particle de with the name of an estate granted by the King as a royal donation. For instance, the aristocratic Hungarian family of the Counts Zichy, having received donations of the two estates of Zichy and Vásonkeő (the first located in Somogy County and the second in Veszprém county), used de Zichy and de Vásonkeő; as this family used two nobiliary particles, the construction in Latin for the whole family name is Comes Zichy de Zichy et Vásonkeő: the Latin conjunction et (and) connects the estate's names. In Hungarian, the relevant county or town of origin is represented with the suffix -i at its end: so, in the case of this family, the place names would be written as zicsi and vásonkeői and would be placed before the family name; the two place names are connected by the Hungarian és (and). So the result would be zicsi és vásonkeői Zichy.

== Portugal ==
Starting in the High Middle Ages, West Iberian nobles, who had only used patronyms, started adding the names of their manors, and in a few cases nicknames, into their names. For instance, Egas Gomes, lord of Sousa, became Egas Gomes de Sousa. King Alfonso X's son Fernando was said to be born with a hairy mole and was called Fernando de la Cerda ("Fernando of the Bristle"), and his son Fernando kept the nickname as his second name and was also called Fernando de la Cerda. In the 15th and 16th centuries, these surnames were adopted by the common people and are among the most common Portuguese surnames today, so the de particle and its variations have not indicated nobility for centuries.

Furthermore, Portuguese nobility, irrespective of any noble name with or without particle, is traditionally recognised only in people both of whose grandfathers and grandmothers are noble.

Portuguese surnames do not indicate nobility, as usually the same surnames exist in noble and non-noble families. The restriction to nobility and the clergy of bearing arms at the beginning of the 16th century, when king Manuel I extinguished the previous bourgeoisie armorial, usually shows someone to be noble if he or she bears personal or family arms. But nobility in Portugal was never restricted to the bearers of arms, and many Portuguese nobles did not or do not have arms at all.

The preposition de and its different orthographic forms (do, dos, da and das), as in France, do not indicate nobility in the bearer. Modern Portuguese law recognises any citizen's right not to sign these particles, even if they are present in that citizen's identification documents, and the opposite right, i.e. to sign one's name with such particles even if not present in one's documents, is also recognized. In fact, articles and prepositions are considered in Portuguese nomenclature an embellishment to any name.

Traditionally, good taste made Portuguese nobility cut down on the prepositions linking their many surnames, and they would sign just one at the beginning of the name; the last surname would be preceded by e (and). For instance, the name João Duarte da Silva dos Santos da Costa de Sousa should be signed just as João Duarte da Silva Santos Costa e Sousa. In the present day, it may also legally be signed João Duarte Silva Santos Costa Sousa. The last e is a substitute for all previous surnames' prepositions except the first one, and cannot ever be used without a previous preposition to justify it. An exception to this rule is only shown with duplicate surnames linked by e, for instance maternal surnames that come before the paternal ones: Diogo Afonso da Conceição e Silva (name and mother's duplicate surname) Tavares da Costa (paternal duplicate surname).

From the 19th century on, it became customary for Portuguese titled nobility to indicate their titles as subsidiary surnames, as, for instance, in the name of Diana Álvares Pereira de Melo, 11th Duchess of Cadaval who goes by Diana de Cadaval after her title. This social rule does not apply to members of the Portuguese royal house.

== Spain ==
In Spain, the nobiliary particle de is also used in two different styles. The first is a "patronymic-de-toponymic" formula, as used by, among others, the fifteenth-century general Gonzalo Fernández de Córdoba, the fourteenth-century chronicler and poet Pero López de Ayala, the European discoverer of the eastern Pacific, Vasco Núñez de Balboa, and many other conquistadors. The second style is use of the particle de before the entire surname. This style resembles but is more ambiguous than the French one, since there is no convention for a different spelling when the de is simply a prepositional particle in non-noble toponymic names such as De la Rúa (literally, "of the street") or De la Torre ("of the tower"). Examples of the nobiliary particle de without patronymic include the names of the sixteenth-century Álvaro de Bazán, 1st Marquis of Santa Cruz and the conquistador Hernando de Soto. This is a common tradition in Spanish culture. Unlike French, Spanish lacks elision, and so no contraction is used when the surname starts with a vowel (though exceptionally we find Pedro Arias Dávila), but contraction is used when the surname includes the article el as in Baltasar del Alcázar.

A Spanish law on names from 1958 and still in force does not allow a person to add a de to their surname if it does not already have it. The law does allow for one exception: a de may be added in front of a surname that could be otherwise misunderstood as a forename. Conclusive proof of the nobility of a surname can be determined by establishing whether that surname is associated with a blazon, since for centuries coats of arms have been borne legally only by persons of noble condition.

Surnames composed of two names linked by a hyphen ("-"), implying that equal importance is given to both families, do not indicate nobility. For example, the hyphenated surname Suárez-Llanos does not indicate nobility.

== Switzerland ==
In Switzerland, de or von, depending on canton of origin, precedes a noble name, de showing a Romance language background and von showing a German or Allemanic background.

== United Kingdom ==
=== England and Wales ===
In the Middle Ages, the words de, borrowed from Latin and French, and the English of, were often used in names in England and Wales, as in "Simon de Montfort" and "Richard of Shrewsbury". The usage of "de" is often misunderstood, as in most cases it was used only in documents written in Latin or French. At the time, in translating into English, "de" was sometimes converted into "of" and sometimes omitted; only rarely was it used in the English form of a name. It is also significant that both "de" and "of" were used simply to show geographical origin in the names of people of all classes, so that in England and Wales neither word should be looked on as in themselves nobiliary.

Despite the lack of official significance of the words "de" or "of" in names, there was sometimes a perception that they connoted nobility. For example, on 8 October 1841, a month after Thomas Trafford was created the 1st Baronet de Trafford, Queen Victoria issued a royal licence to "Sir Thomas Joseph Trafford ... that he may henceforth resume the ancient patronymic of his family, by assuming and using the surname of De Trafford, instead of that of 'Trafford' and that such surname may be henceforth taken and used by his issue." The anglicisation to Trafford had probably occurred in the 15th century, when the Norman article "de", signifying that a family originated from a particular place, was generally dropped in England. The resumption of such older versions of family names was a Romantic trend in 19th-century England, encouraged by a mistaken belief that the article "de" indicated nobility.

As in Spain, English and Welsh surnames composed of two names linked by a hyphen ("-") do not necessarily indicate nobility, e.g. Rees-Jones; not all double barrelled names require a hyphen, e.g. David Lloyd George. In the United Kingdom, a multi-barrelled name was indicative of good pedigree and social standing, such that there was and remains a link between hyphenated names and nobility and gentry. This was to preserve the names of aristocratic families which had died out in the mainline. When this was to occur, it was generally possible for the last male member of his family to convey his "name and arms" (coat of arms) with the rest of his estate via his will, usually to a male descendant of one of his female relatives, who would then apply for a royal licence to take the name. Royal licences could similarly be obtained where the applicant's mother was a heraldic heiress, although this was less common. For instance, Sir Winston Spencer Churchill's surname evidences his descendancy from both the aristocratic Spencer family, amongst whom the Earls Spencer are prominent, and the illustrious background of the Churchills, who hark back to their founder-hero, the prominent military leader John Churchill, 1st Duke of Marlborough and whose descendants had died out in the male line (typically the male line descent would be placed last, so that it would have been 'Churchill-Spencer' had the royal licence not specified that it would be 'Spencer-Churchill'). Some of the grandest members of the British aristocracy have triple-barrelled names, for instance the Vane-Tempest-Stewart family, who hold the marquessate of Londonderry; for a while, the Dukes of Buckingham and Chandos bore five surnames: Temple-Nugent-Brydges-Chandos-Grenville.

In contemporary Britain this correlation has weakened, as more middle and lower-class families have started hyphenating their names on marriage, and/or passing it to their issue, with 11% of newly-weds in the 18–34 demographic hyphenating their surnames as of 2017.

In modern times, a nobiliary particle (as the term is widely understood on the Continent) is rarely used. More usual is the territorial designation, which in practice is almost identical.

=== Scotland ===
In Scotland, there is strictly no nobiliary particle, but the use of the word of as a territorial designation has a long history. In this usage, "of" and a place name follow on from a family surname, as in the name "Aeneas MacDonell of Glengarry". If the place name is identical to the surname, it is sometimes rendered as "that Ilk", e.g. "Iain Moncreiffe of that Ilk". Recognition of a territorial designation is granted in Scotland by the Lord Lyon to Scottish armigers (those entitled to bear a coat of arms) who own or were born in or are associated with named land, generally in a rural area not forming part of a town. The Lord Lyon advises that for a territorial designation to be recognised there must be "ownership of a substantial area of land to which a well-attested name attaches, that is to say, ownership of an 'estate', or farm or, at the very least, a house with policies extending to five acres or thereby". The territorial designation in this case is considered to be an indivisible part of the name, not in itself necessarily indicating historical feudal nobility, but recognition in a territorial designation is usually accorded alongside the grant or matriculation of a Scottish coat of arms, which effectively confers or recognises minor nobility status, even if not ancient. Despite this, the right to bear a territorial designation can also exist for landowners who are not armigerous, but this right is not made good until receiving official recognition; Learney comments: "mere assumption is not sufficient to warrant these territorial and chiefly names". A person bearing a Scottish territorial designation is either a Feudal Baron, Chief or Chieftain or a Laird, the latter denoting "landowner", or is a descendant of one of the same. The Lord Lyon is the ultimate arbiter as to determining entitlement to a territorial designation, and his right of discretion in recognising these, and their status as a name, dignity or title, have been confirmed in the Scottish courts. In speech or correspondence, a Laird is correctly addressed by the name of his estate (particularly in lowland Scotland) or his surname with designation, e.g. William Maitland of Lethington would be addressed as "Lethington" or "Maitland of Lethington".

== Other countries ==
Although many languages have nobiliary particles, their use may sometimes be misleading, as it often does not give any evidence of nobility. Some examples are:

- Latin America:
  - Brazil continued to recognize the distinction of its nobility longer than its republican neighbours, since it remained a monarchy until 1889, but it has also been a republic ever since. Nobility in Brazil was based on that of Portugal, with the only distinction that in the Brazilian Empire titles and simple nobility were conferred only on a personal basis, and could not be inherited, unlike Portugal. In fact, unlike colonial nobility, Brazilian Empire nobility was awarded as a private and personal decoration for one lifespan, though in very rare cases, some Brazilian titles were again conferred to one or two more generations. Brazilian imperial nobility did not enjoy any financial or land privileges. With the exception of the imperial family, a difference between a person with a Brazilian nobiliarchic title or descendant of someone who was a Brazilian noble from another who was not a noble and not descended from a Brazilian noble, was only the status and distinction of nobility.
  - Spanish-speaking countries other than Spain use the particle de without legally meaning nobility. With only a few short-lived exceptions, all Spanish American countries adopted a republican form of government and abolished noble distinctions (but see the article on the Mexican nobility). Laws on names vary in Latin America but occasionally people are able to fashion new surnames that may sound noble: an example is Javier Pérez de Cuéllar, whose father, Ricardo Pérez de Cuéllar, decided to permanently combine his last names as a more distinguishable paternal last name for his offspring.
- Arabic-speaking countries: The definitive article al (or el in Lebanon and Palestine) meaning 'the' is added before the surname to add noblesse. For example, Suleiman Ahmad could become Suleiman Al-Ahmad. Nobility in the Middle East varies as diversely as the cultures in the Arab world. Some examples: Maronite nobility had been granted by the church (El Azzi, El Khazen, et al.), versus Islamic nobility such as the Hashemite dynasty which based their status on descent from the Prophet Mohammed. Other noble families married into the European aristocracy, such as the House of Sursock. Many names bearing the particles el or al are pertinent to their place of origin (e.g. El Tabarji, 'the person from Tabarja').
- Italy: The nobiliary particles (or predicati) de or di are used after the surname or the name of the title. Di is sometimes contracted when the surname begins with a vowel, in accordance with Italian orthography. An example of nobility is the name of the noted writer Giuseppe Tomasi di Lampedusa, where Tomasi is the surname and Lampedusa was the family's feudal property. An ordinary use is found in the name of the American actor Leonardo DiCaprio, of Italian descent (his surname is spelled as a single word, in accordance with standard American practice). Surnames of certain Italian noble families are by their nature toponymic, reflecting the names of medieval feudal properties, e.g. di Savoia, d'Aquino. Further, the use of the particle de or de’ is often an abbreviation for dei, suggesting the family is of a noble family. For instance, Lorenzo de’ Medici means 'Lorenzo of the Medici [family]'. The use of the particle de might also suggest that the family descends from a Norman nobility, which continues to employ the Latin usage. Nevertheless, the ordinary use of the prepositions Di ('of') or Da ('from'), also in conjunction with articles (Del, Della, Dei, Dal, Dalla, Dai, etc. ) can easily be part of the actual name and does not indicate nobility ex se.
- Netherlands: The particle van is not an indicator of nobility (it is called a tussenvoegsel): the percentage of van-preceded surnames that are noble is not significantly higher than that of any other surname; they are evenly spread over the social strata. The particles tot and thoe, historically meaning 'at' and related to German zu, are a strong indicator of nobility if combined with van in a surname, such as van Voorst tot Voorst (the prepositions tot and thoe were once used to denote the place of residence of a lord, whereas van referred to the domain whence he derived his title). Note that many noble families in the Netherlands have non-noble branches that are closely related and share the same surname. Double surnames are, therefore, a weak but significant indicator of nobility; many patrician and other families have double names as well.
- Somalia: The nobiliary particle is Aw, meaning 'honorable', 'venerable', or simply 'Sir'. It is reserved for learned Islamic clerics and used throughout the Somali territories. During his research in the ancient town of Amud, the historian G.W.B. Huntingford noticed that whenever an old site had the prefix Aw in its name (such as the Regional Governor of Gedo, Aw libaax), it denoted the final resting place of a local saint.
- Belgium: The Flemish words de, der, and van may be nobiliary particles, but as in the Netherlands they are more often not of nobiliary origin, so are not in themselves evidence of nobility. De is related to the identical French word.
- Sweden: Some noble families use af as a nobiliary particle. This is the pre-1906 spelling of the modern Swedish av ('of'), and corresponds to the German von. Von has also been used in some noble families of German or Swedish origin. Thus Carl Linnaeus, upon his ennoblement, took the name Carl von Linné. The particles af and von do not have to be used with a toponym; they can simply be attached to the pre-noble surname.

The particle de has also been used in some Swedish families descended from craftsmen and others immigrated in the 16th and 17th centuries from Wallonia in present-day Belgium. A well-known example is the De Geer family; other examples include Du Rietz and De Besche.

- Finland: the old Swedish form af and the German von, denoting descent or location, are used in some noble families.
- Thailand: The Thai word na (of Pali origin) may be granted by a Thai monarch to form a Thai family name signifying 'of' a former kingdom or tributary state of Siam. Example: Na Ayudhya, putative royal lineage in the Ayutthaya Kingdom that may be granted after marriage into the royal Chakri Dynasty. The honorific particles Sri (RTGS: Si) and Phra (พระ) are also used in various names of Thai nobility (e.g., Somdet Chao Phraya Sri Suriwongse, RTGS: Si Suriwong). Phra, which is rooted in the Sanskrit vara (in Pali: bara) means 'holy' or 'excellent' and is also used as a formal address (Preah) in the royal names of several Cambodian rulers (Preah Norodom Sihanouk and his son Preah Norodom Sihamoni). The particle Sri which derives from the old Indo-Aryan Sanskrit word Shri that was used in Vedic scriptures to address gods, goddesses (e.g., Sri Lakshmi) and kings (rajahs), is also used in other countries of Southeast Asia with respective vowel shifts. Variations of it, for example, are found in the federal constitutional monarchy of Malaysia (granted title datuk seri as in: Dato Seri Najib Razak), in the Republic of Indonesia (Batak and Indonesian national hero: King Sisingamangaraja XII; Javanese: Sri Mulyani Indrawati, former Finance Minister of Indonesia) and in Sri Lanka (country name itself and the last ruler of the Sinhalese Kingdom: Sri Vikrama Rajasinha).

== See also ==
- Grammatical particle
- Immemorial nobility
- List of family name affixes
- Royal and noble ranks
- Spanish naming customs
- Io, Romanian royal particle
- Territorial designation
- No (kana), formerly used for noble Uji affiliation in Japan
