= Reese (given name) =

- Pronunciation: /ˈris/
- Gender: Unisex
- Language: English

Origin
- Languages: English, Welsh
- Origin: Anglicisation of Rhys
- Meaning: "Wreath" or "Garland"
- Region of origin: Wales

Other names
- Variant form: Reece

Reese is an anglicised spelling of the Welsh name Rhys. It is now a unisex given name which means wreath or garland. It also means "ardent" or "fiery".

In 2012, the female version of the name peaked, ranking at 128 in popularity of given names in the United States. The male version of the name peaked in 2003, ranked at 368; at the time, the female Reese was ranked at 464. The name Reese overall was not ranked in the top 1000 until the year 2000.

Pronunciation of the name "Reese"

Pronunciation of the name "Rhys"

== Notable people with the given name "Reese" include ==
- Reese Andy (born 1973), American mixed martial artist
- Reese Atwood, American softball player
- Reese Bowen Brabson (1817–1863), American politician
- Reese Brantmeier (born 2004), American tennis player
- Reese Clark (1847–1921), American politician
- Reese C. De Graffenreid (1859–1902), American politician
- Reese Diggs (1915–1978), American baseball player
- Reese Dismukes (born 1992), American football player
- Reese DuPree (1883–1963), American singer
- Reese Erlich (1947–2021), American author and journalist
- Reese Esponda (born 2008), American artistic gymnast
- Reese Fernandez-Ruiz (born 1985), Filipino entrepreneur
- Reese Griffiths (1937–2016), New Zealand rugby league footballer
- Reese Hanneman (born 1989), American skier
- Reese Havens (born 1986), American baseball player
- Reese Hoffa (born 1977), American shot putter
- Reese Johnson (born 1998), Canadian ice hockey player
- Reese Klaiber, Canadian musician
- Reese Lansangan (born 1990), Filipino musician
- Reese J. Llewellyn (1862–1936), Welsh-American businessman
- Reese Lynch (born 2001), Scottish boxer
- Reese McCall (born 1956), American football player
- Reese McGuire (born 1995), American baseball player
- Reese Milner, American bridge player
- Reese Mishler (born 1991), American actor
- Reese Olson (born 1999), American baseball player
- Reese Palley (1922–2015), American entrepreneur
- Reese Prosser (1927–1996), American mathematician
- Reese Roper (born 1973), American singer-songwriter
- Reese Rowling (1928–2001), American businessman
- Reese Schonfeld (1931–2020), American journalist
- Reese Stalder (born 1996), American tennis player
- Reese Taylor (born 1999), American football player
- Reese Waters (born 1980), American comedian
- Reese Witherspoon (born 1976), American actress
- Reese Wynans (born 1947), American keyboard player

== Fictional characters ==
- Dr. Reese Drake, a supporting character in the Dinosaur King franchise
- Reese Wilkerson, a main character on Malcolm in the Middle
- Reese Williams, a character on the ABC drama All My Children
- Reese Williams (Chalk), a character associated with Moon Knight in Marvel Comics
- Reese Bobby, father of Ricky Bobby in Talladega Nights
