= Rhyse =

Rhyse may refer to:

- Rhyse Martin (born 1993), Papuan rugby league football player
- Rhyse, Missouri, U.S.

== See also ==
- Rhyce Shaw (born 1981), Australian rules football player
- Rhys, a name
- Rice (disambiguation)
- Rise (disambiguation)
- Ryce, a surname
- Rys (disambiguation)
