= Oree =

Oree may refer to:

== Places ==
- Orée-du-Parc District, Gatineau, Quebec, Canada
- Orée-d'Anjou, a commune in Maine-et-Loire, France
- L'Orée-d'Écouves, a commune in Orne, France
- L'Orée, a residential development in Lésigny, Seine-et-Marne, France
- Oree, a village in Imo State, Nigeria
- Oree, a village in Kwara State, Nigeria

== Other uses ==
- O'Ree, a surname
- Royal Orée, a field hockey team that participated in the 2018–19 Men's Belgian Hockey League

== People with the given name ==
- Oree Banks (born 1936), American football player and coach
- Oree Bozeman, namesake of Oree Bozman Intermediate School in the Conroe Independent School District
- Oree Originol (born 1984), American artist, activist
- Oree Walker (died 1991), mother of Cindy Walker

=== Fictional ===
- Oree Shoth, a character in The Broken Kingdoms

== See also ==
- Charny-Orée-de-Puisaye, a commune in Yonne, France
- Communauté de communes de l'Orée de la Brie, a metropolitan community in Île-de-France, France
- École de l'Orée-des-Cantons, an elementary school in the Commission scolaire du Val-des-Cerfs
- Ree (disambiguation)
