= David Reese =

David Reese or Reece may refer to:

- David A. Reese (1794–1871), American politician and doctor
- David Meredith Reese (1800–1861), American physician and skeptic
- David P. Reese (1871–1935), American politician from Pennsylvania
- David Reece (bishop) (1895–1981), Archdeacon of Margam
- David P. Reese Jr. (1905–1962), American politician from Pennsylvania
- Dave Reece (born 1948), American professional ice hockey goaltender
- Chip Reese (1951–2007), American professional gambler
- David Reece (born 1960), lead singer of German heavy metal band Accept, Bangalore Choir, and Gypsy Rose

== See also ==
- David Rees (disambiguation)
