= Rhys =

Rhys or Rhŷs is a popular Welsh given name (usually male) that is famous in Welsh history and is also used as a surname. It originates from Deheubarth, an old region of South West Wales, with famous kings such as Rhys ap Tewdwr.

It is pronounced [r̥ɨːs] in North Wales, [r̥iːs] in South Wales, and /riːs/ REESS in English. Anglicised forms of the name include Reece, Rees, Reese and Rice.

== People with the given name ==
Pronunciation of the name 'Rhys'.

Pronunciation of the name 'Reese'.

=== History ===
- Rhys ap Gruffydd (1132–1197), 12th-century ruler of southern Wales
- Sir Rhys ap Gruffydd (died 1356), 14th-century Welsh nobleman
- Rhys ap Gruffydd (rebel) (1508–1531), executed 16th-century Welsh landowner
- Rhys ap Tewdwr (died 1093), 11th-century prince of southern Wales
- Rhys ap Thomas (1449–1525), a Welsh soldier and landholder who was instrumental in the victory of Henry Tudor at the Battle of Bosworth Field
- Rhys Lewis (born 1532), MP for New Radnor Boroughs October 1553 and 1558
- Rhys Hooe (c. 1599 – after 1655), Virginia colonist from Wales

=== 20th and 21st centuries ===
- Rhys Bobridge (born 1981), Australian singer and dancer
- Rhys Chatham (born 1952), American avant-garde "guitar orchestra" composer
- Rhys (singer) (Rhys Clarstedt, born 1997), Swedish-American singer
- Rhys Coiro (born 1979), American film actor and singer
- Rhys Dakin (born 2004), Australian-American football player
- Rhys Darby (born 1974), stand-up comedian from New Zealand
- Rhys Davies (born 1985), Welsh golfer
- Rhys Day (born 1982), Welsh footballer
- Rhys Evans (born 1982), English footballer
- Rhys Frake-Waterfield, English filmmaker
- Rhys Fulber (born 1970), Canadian musician (Front Line Assembly)
- Rhys Gemmell (1896–1972), Australian tennis player
- Rhys Hanbury (born 1985), Australian rugby league footballer
- Rhys Hoskins (born 1993), American professional baseball player
- Rhys Huber (born 1986), Canadian voice actor
- Rhys Hughes (born 1966), Welsh writer
- Rhys Ifans (born 1967), Welsh actor
- Rhys Isaac (1937–2010), professor
- Rhys James (born 1991), English comedian
- Rhys Jenkins (born 1990), rugby union player
- Rhys Jones (disambiguation), the name of several people
- Rhys McClenaghan (born 1999), Irish artistic gymnast
- Rhys Millen (born 1972), car racer
- Rhys Muldoon (born 1965), Australian actor
- Rhys Nicholson (born 1990), Australian comedian and actor
- Rhys Oakley (born 1980), Wales international rugby union player
- Rhys Palmer (born 1989), Australian rules footballer
- Rhys Patchell (born 1993), Welsh rugby union player
- Rhys Priestland (born 1987), Welsh rugby union player
- Rhys Rhys-Williams (1865–1955), British Liberal Party politician
- Rhys Stanley (born 1990), Australian rules footballer
- Rhys Taylor (born 1990), Welsh footballer
- Rhys Thomas (comedian) (born 1978), English comedian and actor
- Rhys M. Thomas (born 1982), Welsh international rugby union player
- Rhys Wakefield (born 1988), Australian actor
- Rhys Webb (born 1988), Welsh rugby union player
- Rhys Wesser (born 1979), Australian professional rugby league footballer
- Rhys Williams (rugby union, born 1980), Welsh rugby player
- R. H. Williams (rugby union) (1930–1993), Welsh rugby player

== People with the middle name or compound last name ==
- Arthur Rhys-Davids (1897–1917), British flying ace
- Brandon Rhys-Williams (1927–1988), British Conservative Party politician
- Griff Rhys Jones (born 1953), Welsh comedian and presenter
- John Rhys-Davies (born 1944), Welsh actor
- John Rhys Davies (priest) (1890–1953), Welsh Anglican priest
- John Rhys Plumlee (born 2001), American football quarterback for the University of Central Florida Knights
- Micael Rhys Bennett (born 1965), Native American broadcast announcer
- Jonathan Rhys Meyers (born 1977), Irish actor
- Samaire Rhys Armstrong, (born 1980), American actress
- Sophie, Duchess of Edinburgh, (born Sophie Rhys-Jones; 1965) member of the British royal family
- Tim Rhys-Evans (born 1972), Welsh musician
- T. Rhys Thomas (born 1982), Wales international rugby union player
- Rhys Rhys-Williams (1865–1955), British Liberal Party politician
- Tom Rhys Harries (born 1990), Welsh actor

== People with the surname ==
- Beti Rhys, (1907–2003), Welsh bookstore owner and author
- Elen Rhys, (born 1983), Welsh actress
- Elspeth Rhŷs (Elspeth Hughes-Davies, 1841–1911), Welsh teacher, linguist, and campaigner for women's suffrage and education
- Ernest Rhys (1859–1946), English writer
- Gruff Rhys (born 1970), vocalist and guitarist
- Jean Rhys (1890–1979), Caribbean writer
- Sir John Rhŷs (1840–1915), Celtic scholar at Oxford
- John Llewellyn Rhys, an airman memorialised by John Llewellyn Rhys prize
- Keidrych Rhys (1915–1987), Welsh literary journalist and editor
- Matthew Rhys (born 1974), Welsh actor
- Morgan John Rhys (1760–1804), Baptist minister
- Myvanwy Rhys (1874–1945), Welsh suffragist and historian
- Paul Rhys (born 1963), Welsh television, film and theatre actor
- Siôn Dafydd Rhys (1534 – c. 1609), Welsh physician and grammarian

== Fictional characters ==
- Lt Cmdr Gen Rhys, from Star Trek: Discovery, portrayed by Patrick Kwok-Choon.
- Rhys (Rhysand), from the series A Court of Thorns and Roses by Sarah J. Maas
- Knight Rhys, a member of the Brotherhood of steel in the video game Fallout 4
- Rhys Winterborne from Marrying Winterborne, by Lisa Kleypas
- Rhys, in the video game Fire Emblem: Path of Radiance
- Rhys, in the Merry Gentry book series by Laurell K. Hamilton
- Rhys, the central character of the first generation of the video game Phantasy Star III
- Rhys Strongfork, a main player-character from the Tales from the Borderlands video game, CEO of the Atlas corporation in the video games Borderlands 3 and New Tales from the Borderlands
- Rhys, in The Two Princesses of Bamarre by Gail Carson Levine
- Rhys Ashworth, on the British soap opera Hollyoaks
- Rhys Dahl, in Switched by Amanda Hlcking
- Rhys Dallows, from the video game Star Wars: Starfighter
- Rhys Lawson, from the Australian soap opera Neighbours
- Rhys Lewis, the eponymous subject of the 1885 novel by Daniel Owen
- Rhys Maelwaedd, a character of the Deverry Cycle book series
- Rhys Montrose, from the television series You
- Rhys Rhysson, the Low King of the dwarfs in Terry Pratchett's Discworld books
- Rhys Williams, in the BBC science fiction series Torchwood
- Rhys, an elvish hunter in the Gilt-Leaf tribe, from the Lorwyn and Shadowmoor blocks of the collectible card game, Magic: The Gathering
- Rhys Sutherland, in the Home and Away television series
- Rhys Larsen, in the twisted series, Twisted games by the author Ana Huang

== The patronymic form ==
The surnames Price, Prys, Pris and Preece are derived from the Welsh ap Rhys meaning 'son of Rhys'. Notable people with this surname include:

- John Prise or Price (1501–1555), also called Syr Siôn ap Rhys, Welsh scholar and author of the first book to be printed in Welsh,
- Hywel ap Rhys (c. 840 – 886), ancient Welsh king of Glywysing
- Tomos Prys (c. 1564 – 1634), Welsh soldier, sailor and poet

== See also ==
- Reece (disambiguation)
- Rees (disambiguation)
- Reese (disambiguation)
- Reis (disambiguation)
- Rhees (disambiguation)
- Rhyce Shaw (born 1981) Australian rules football player
- Rhyse (disambiguation)
- Rice (disambiguation)
- Rise (disambiguation)
- Ryce (surname)
- Rys (disambiguation)
