= Rhee =

Rhee may refer to:

- Rhee, Netherlands
- River Rhee, a tributary of the River Cam, in Cambridgeshire, England

== People ==
- A common Korean surname, Lee, which is also commonly transliterated as Rhee or Yi. In Korea, the name is written using the hanja Li 李.
- Several people bearing the Korean surname, as noted at List of people with the Korean family name Lee

=== Given name ===
- Rhee Timbang, Filipino cleric and 13th Supreme Bishop of the Philippine Independent Church

=== Surname ===
- Margaret Rhee, American feminist poet
- Michelle Rhee (born 1969), American educator and former Chancellor of the District of Columbia school system
- Peter M. Rhee (born 1961), American physician and US Navy veteran
- Phillip Rhee (born 1960), South Korean-American actor and martial-arts master
- Syngman Rhee (1875–1965), South Korean President

== See also ==
- Master Rhee (disambiguation)
- Rhee Brothers (disambiguation)
- Re (disambiguation)
- Ree (disambiguation)
- Rhea (disambiguation)
- Rhees (disambiguation)
