= Daggerspell =

1986 fantasy novel by Katharine Kerr

- Front cover.
- Author: Katharine Kerr
- Language: English
- Series: Deverry Cycle
- Genre: Fantasy
- Publisher: Del Rey in 1986; Current edition 1993 Spectra
- Publication date: September 1, 1986
- Publication place: United States
- Media type: Print (Hardcover, Paperback); Audiobook; E-book
- Pages: 480
- ISBN: 0-553-56521-4
- OCLC: 29450516
- Followed by: Darkspell

Daggerspell 1986 is a fantasy novel by American writer Katharine Kerr. Her first novel, it is also the first book in the Celtic-themed, multi-reincarnational Deverry Cycle.

== Plot ==
=== Year 1045 ===
The sorcerer Nevyn sees an omen indicating that a person whose destiny is intertwined with his own has been reborn, and sees the infant Jill in a vision.

=== Year 1052 ===
Jill, a seven-year-old girl who sometimes has precognitive dreams, loses her mother Seryan to a fever. Because her father, Cullyn, is a mercenary soldier – known as a "silver dagger" for the weapon he carries – and visits irregularly, Jill is taken in by a local tavern owner. Cullyn arrives in Jill's village a month later. Finding Seryan dead, he decides to take Jill with him on his wanderings, which he calls "the long road.”

For seven years, Nevyn has been searching for Jill, with nothing more than luck and intuition to guide him. He finds a clue when he meets the ten-year-old lord Rhodry Maelwaedd, and sees that the boy's destiny is linked with his and Jill's.

=== Year 643 ===
Galrion, a prince of Deverry, has secretly begun studying sorcery. He begins to fall in love with its power, and out of love with his betrothed, Brangwen of the Falcon clan. Galrion considers breaking his betrothal so that he will have more time to devote to the study of sorcery. Galrion's father, King Adoryc, is infuriated when he discovers that his son has been studying sorcery, and puts Galrion under house arrest, though the prince escapes by a ruse.

Adoryc soon finds his son and sends him into exile, taking from him all his rank, titles, and property. He even takes Galrion's name from him, and gives him a new name, Nevyn, meaning "no one." Adoryc also breaks Nevyn's betrothal to Brangwen, who then falls into an incestuous relationship with her brother Gerraent, and the two promise to end their lives together when autumn comes.

When Gerraent's sworn friend, Blaen of the Boar clan, discovers the incestuous relationship, Gerraent kills him. Gerraent is in turn killed by Blaen's brother. Nevyn takes Brangwen away from the Falcon lands, but the distraught girl drowns herself. Overwhelmed by guilt and grief, Nevyn rashly swears an oath that he will not rest until he sets things right. Thunder booms from a clear sky – a sign that his oath has been accepted by the Great Ones (transcendent spiritual beings similar to Bodhisattvas).

=== Year 1058 ===
When Jill turns thirteen, Cullyn, who has been teaching his daughter swordcraft, buys Jill a silver dagger like his own for a birthday present. Otho, the smith who made the dagger, notices that Jill can see spirits called Wildfolk, and tells her a riddle. "If you ever find no one (nev yn), ask him what craft to take." Some time later, Otho tells Nevyn about Jill. Unable to find her, Nevyn returns to his home province of Eldidd, where he saves the life of Rhodry Maelwaedd, earning the gratitude of his mother Lovyan, the local feudal lord. Nevyn receives a prophecy about the boy – Rhodry's destiny is somehow bound to that of the entire province.

=== Year 696 ===
Nevyn comes to Deverry province to banish an unnatural drought. Here he finds the bard Gweran (Blaen reborn), his wife Lyssa (Brangwen reborn), and a soldier called Tanyc (Gerraent reborn). When Tanyc angers Gweran by his behavior towards Lyssa, Gweran takes his revenge by subterfuge. He provokes Tanyc into attacking him – but as a bard, Gweran's life is sacrosanct. Tanyc is hanged for his crime.

While this is happening, Nevyn meets Lyssa's elder son, Aderyn. He teaches the boy a little herbcraft, and eventually takes him as apprentice in sorcery.

=== Year 1062 ===
Lovyan discovers that Rhodry has fathered a bastard child on a low-born girl, and decides to put the child into fosterage with one of her noble servitors when it is born. In the meantime, Lovyan is having trouble with some of her vassals. A number of minor lords are sitting on the edge of rebellion over matters of succession and taxes. Lovyan's own liege lord, Rhys, the Gwerbret of Aberwyn (who is also her eldest son), makes it very clear that he won't intervene unless she disinherits Rhodry.

Cullyn, meanwhile has taken a hire guarding a caravan heading toward the kingdom's western border to trade with the mysterious Westfolk. On the way, Jill sees the eerie Loddlaen, a councilor to Lord Corbyn of Bruddlyn. At the trading camp, Jill meets Aderyn, an old Deverrian man who lives with the Westfolk. She also learns that Loddlaen is a fugitive murderer. At the conclusion of the trading, Aderyn and several of the Westfolk accompany the caravan back to the city of Cannobaen, to begin legal proceedings against Loddlaen in Lovyan's court.

On the way to Cannobaen, the caravan is attacked by bandits, and flees to an abandoned fort to make their stand. Aderyn transforms himself into an owl to spy on the bandits. He discovers that they aren't bandits at all, but warriors from several different lords, including Corbyn. Cullyn sends Jill to beg the Lovyan for aid. By a stroke of luck, Jill comes across Rhodry and his entire warband on the road, in the midst of a day-long training exercise.

Meanwhile, the attacking army has reached the fort. The defense is thin: two swordsmen, two archers, and six stavemen. Albaral, a man of the Westfolk, is slain, but the attackers are defeated when Rhodry and his warband arrive.

== Characters ==
- Jill
- Nevyn
- Cullyn of Cerrmor
- Rhodry Maelwaedd
- Perryn

== Publication history ==
Daggerspell was first published in hardcover by Del Rey in 1986. In 1993, an author's definitive edition was released as a mass market paperback by Bantam. The Kindle edition is available from Random House from Amazon. Bantam Spectra published the revised edition as an e-book in both Kindle and Nook formats in December 2010.

In June 2018, Tantor Audio released an unabridged audio recording of the revised edition narrated by Ruth Urquhart.
