= David Rees =

David or Dai Rees may refer to:

== Entertainment ==
- David Rees (author) (1936–1993), British children's author
- Dave Rees (born 1969), American drummer for SNFU and Wheat Chiefs
- David Rees (cartoonist) (born 1972), American cartoonist and television host

== Sports ==
- Dai Rees (rugby, born c. 1885), Welsh rugby league footballer who played in the 1900s
- Dai Rees (rugby, 1920s), Welsh rugby union and rugby league footballer who played in the 1920s and 1930s, and coached rugby league in the 1930s to the 1960s
- Dai Rees (1913–1983), Welsh golfer
- David Rees (British cross-country skier) (born 1940), British cross-country skier
- David Rees (Canadian cross-country skier) (born 1943), Canadian cross-country skier
- Dai Rees (rugby union, born 1964), Welsh rugby union footballer who played in the 2000s, and coached in the 2000s and 2010s
- David Rees (rugby union, born 1974), English rugby union footballer who played in the 1990s and 2000s

== Other ==
- David Rees (Y Cynhyrfwr) (1801–1869), Welsh Nonconformist minister and editor
- David Rees (mathematician) (1918–2013), British mathematician
- Sir Dai Rees (biochemist) (1936–2021), British biochemist and science administrator
- D. Ben Rees (David Benjamin Rees, born 1937), Welsh-language publisher and leader of the Welsh community in Liverpool
- David Rees (politician) (born 1957), member of the National Assembly for Wales
- David Rees (organic chemist) (born 1958), British organic chemist and chief scientific officer at Astex

== See also ==
- David Rees-Williams, 1st Baron Ogmore (1903–1976), British politician
- Rees for people with this surname
- David Reese (disambiguation)
- David Reece (born 1960), American singer
