= Robert Rees =

Robert Rees may refer to:

- Robert Rees (cricketer) (1882-1966), Australian cricketer
- Robert Rees (singer) (1841–1892), Welsh singer
- Robert Rees (journalist) (1938–2005), American journalist
- Robert A. Rees (born 1935), American educator and poet
- Bob Rees (born 1938), Australian rules footballer

== See also ==
- Robert Reece (disambiguation)
- Robert Rhys, editor of Barn magazine
- Bob Reis (born 1968), American stock car racing driver
- Bob Reiss (born 1951), American author
- Bob Reiss (priest) (1943–2023), English Anglican priest and author
