= Characters in the Deverry Cycle =

This article lists some of the major characters in the Deverry Cycle by Katharine Kerr. The core characters of the Deverry cycle appear under different names in various books and at various times due to being reincarnated. The Deverry culture in the cycle is heavily influenced by Kerr’s extensive reading on both the Celts and classical Graeco-Roman society. Having no written records by the Celts themselves, it is a matter of dispute if Ancient Celtic religion included a belief in reincarnation. Several ancient classical sources refer to the Celts as believing in reincarnation.

== Incarnations ==
Incarnations of Deverry Cycle characters
| 71 C.E. | 643 | 696 | 718 | 773 | 835–843 | 918 | 980 | 1060s | 1100s | 1150s |
|---|---|---|---|---|---|---|---|---|---|---|
| Hwilli | Brangwen | Lyssa | | Gweniver | Branoic | | Morwen | Jill | Jill | Branna |
| Galerinos | Galrion | Nevyn | Nevyn | Nevyn | Nevyn | Nevyn | Nevyn | Nevyn | | Neb |
| Rhodorix | Blaen | Gweran | | Ricyn | Maddyn | Maer | Meddry | Rhodry | Rhodry | Rori |
| Gerontos | Gerraent | Tanyc | Cinvan | Dannyn | Owaen | Danry | Gwairyc | Cullyn | | Gerran |
| Brennos | Madoc | | Addryc | Glyn | Caradoc | | | Blaen of Cwm Pecl | Drwmyc | Voran |
| | Rodda | Cabrylla | | Dolyan | | | | Lovyan | | |
| | Ysolla | Cadda | | Macla | Clwna | Braedda | | Seryan | | Solla |
| | Rhegor | | | | | | | Caer | | |
| | Ylaena | | | | Bellyra | Glaenara | | | Carramaena | Carramaena |
| | Adoryc | | | | Burcan | | | Sarcyn | Verrarc | Aethel |
| | | | | Dagwyn | Aethan | Leomyr | | Gwin | | Warryc |
| | | | | Saddar | Oggyn | | | Ogwern | | Oth |
| | | | | | Anasyn | | | | Kiel | |
| | | | | | Lillorigga | | Lanmara | | Niffa | Niffa |
| | | | | | Bevyan | | | | Dera | Galla |
| | | | | | Merodda | | Mella | Mallona | Raena | Sidro |
| | | | | Mael | | Pertyc Maelwaedd | | Rhodda | Lady Rhodda | |
| | | | | | Olaen | | | | Jahdo | Jahdo |
| | | | | | Maryn | | | | Yraen | Clae |
| | | | | | Elyssa | | | Alaena | Marka | |
| | | | | | | | | Rhys | | Ridvar |
| | | | | | | | | Sligyn | Erddyr | Cadryc |
| | | | | | Brour | | Tirro | Alastyr | Tren | Laz Moj |
| | | | | | | | | Perryn | | Pir |
| | | | | | | | Loddlaen | Loddlaen | | Dari |
| | | | | | | | Javanateriel | | | Braelindar |
| | | | | | Trevyr | | | | | Nicedd |
| Nalla | Dallandra | Dallandra | Dallandra | Dallandra | Dallandra | Dallandra | Dallandra | Dallandra | Dallandra | Dallandra |

== People of Deverry ==
=== Jill ===
Cullyn's daughter, who has latent dweomer talent. As a child, she follows her father on his wanderings, and learns swordcraft from him. Jill becomes Rhodry's lover, following him into exile. After being separated from Rhodry, Jill is abducted by Perryn, who places her under his strange spell, though Salamander eventually rescues her. Perryn's influence causes Jill's latent dweomer abilities to manifest; she begins studying under Salamander to avoid being driven mad by supernatural forces. The two of them sail to Bardek to rescue Rhodry from slavery, but upon return to Deverry, she leaves Rhodry behind to become Nevyn's apprentice, and eventually succeeds him as Master of Aethyr. When the Horsekin lay siege to Cengarn, Jill assists in the city's defence, and slays the mad Guardian Alshandra—although she dies in the act.

Appears in: Prologue in the year 1045, Cerrgonney 1052, Deverry 1058;

Other incarnations: Hwilli; Brangwen, appears in Deverry 643; Lyssa, appears in Deverry 698; Gweniver, Branoic, Morwen, Branna.

=== Nevyn ===
Nevyn is a traveling herbman—an apothecary-physician who practices herbal medicine. He is also a powerful sorcerer known as the Master of Aethyr. In his youth, he was Galrion, a prince of Deverry, but is stripped of that name along with all his rank and titles. His new name, Nevyn, means "no one" in the Deverrian language. When his selfish actions result in the death of Brangwen, his betrothed and a woman with the potential to be a great sorceress, Nevyn swears an oath "not to rest" until he set things right. Because his oath has been accepted by powerful spirits called Great Ones, Nevyn is incapable of dying until he fulfills his oath.

Appears in: Deverry 643; Deverry and Pyrdon 833-845; Deverry 698; Prologue in the year 1045; Summer 1045; Other incarnations: Neb.

=== Cullyn of Cerrmor ===
Cullyn is a wandering mercenary, who is renowned as the greatest swordsman in Deverry. Cullyn saves Rhodry Maelwaedd's life during Loddlaen's rebellion, and in gratitude the young lord accepts him into his service, even making Cullyn the captain of his warband. Cullyn dies in the interval between the end of The Dragon Revenant and the beginning of A Time of Exile.

Appears in: Cerrgonney 1052; Other incarnations: Gerraent, appears in: Deverry 643; Tanyc, appears in Deverry 698; Owaen, appears in Deverry and Pyrdon 833-845; Cinvan, Dannyn, Danry, Gwairyc, Gerran.

=== Rhodry Maelwaedd ===
[Rod-ree] Publicly believed to be the youngest son of Tingyr Maelwaedd, his father is in fact Devaberiel Silverhand, an elven bard—though only a handful of people know his true parentage. After Loddlaen's dweomer war, he is sent into political exile by his half-brother Rhys. During his wanderings, Rhodry is captured and sold as a slave in the Bardekian islands. When Rhys is mortally wounded, Rhodry is recalled from exile to take his brother's place as the Gwerbret of Aberwyn. When his true lineage is in danger of being discovered, Rhodry fakes his own death, and begins living among the Westfolk. Near the end of "The Fire Dragon", Rhodry undergoes a physical transformation as Evandar strives to save his life from Raena's stabbing.

Other incarnations: Rhodorix, Blaen, appears in: Deverry 643; Gweran, appears in Deverry 698; Ricyn, Maddyn, Maer, Meddry

=== Carramaena ===
Carramaena is the daughter of a noble-born, but poor, family. When her miserly brother inherits the demesne, she runs off to avoid being forcibly married. She seeks her lover, Prince Daralanteriel of the Westfolk, and finds him with Rhodry's help. Carramaena and Daralanteriel marry, and their child is the incarnation of the Guardian Elessario.

Other incarnations: Ylaena, Bellyra, Glaenara

=== Perryn ===
Perryn is a landless lord who survives by mooching from his relatives and by theft. He has an unusual psychic ability which he uses to seduce women and steal horses, unaware that it consumes his life-force. He enthralls and abducts Jill. Salamander rescues her and has Perryn sent to Nevyn to save his life. He later becomes a priest of the god Kerun.

Other incarnations: Pir

=== Aderyn ===
Aderyn is the son of a bard, Gweran, and his wife, Lyssa. He also learns the dweomer from Nevyn and his dweomer skills include being able to transform into an owl. After he completes his apprenticeship, Aderyn leaves Deverry to live among the Westfolk. He marries a woman of the Westfolk, Dallandra, who bears him a son, Loddlaen. He was given an elven lifespan, a gift from the Guardian Evandar so that he may live to see his wife Dallandra again after she left the physical world to help Evandar and his people, where time runs differently. However, Evandar does not grant him the elven gift of youth, and he ages as a human does. After 7 days in Evandars world, Dallandra returns to Aderyn but almost 200 years have passed in the physical. By this time Aderyn had lost all hope of seeing Dallandra again. Though he suffered greatly within himself he could no longer return her love and Dallandra left him again to return to the guardians soon after birthing Alodalenterial (Loddlaen).

=== Rhys Maelwaedd ===
Lovyan's eldest son, and the Gwerbrert of Aberwyn. He despises Rhodry, who is generally better-liked. After Corbyn's rebellion, Rhys sends Rhodry into exile, to curry favour with his vassals, and to seize the lands Rhodry would have inherited upon Lovyan's death. Rhys has fertility problems so leaves no heirs. He is killed in a magically-contrived hunting accident.

Other incarnations: Ridvar

=== Lovyan ===
The widow of the previous Gwerbret of Aberwyn, Tingyr Maelwaedd. She has four children, of which Rhodry is the only one still alive. Although Deverrian noblewomen do not usually hold titles or lands, Lovyan rules a large demesne in her own right.

Other incarnations: Rodda, Cabrylla, Dolyan

== Westfolk ==
=== Ebañy Salomonderiel tranDevaberiel ===
Usually known as Salamander for brevity. He is a half-human and half-elven gerthddyn (a travelling singer and entertainer) as well as a journeyman dweomerworker. His manner of speaking is often overly verbose and flowery; Jill often addresses him as "you chattering elf!" In later books, he becomes a powerful dweomermaster in his own right, and spends more of his time travelling with his Westfolk kin. He is also Rhodry's half-brother, sharing a father, Devaberiel. He dies with his nephew Rory's dragon son.

=== Valandario ===
An elven dweomermaster (Wise One) and gem master who can use gems to scry and search for omens. She was Salamander's master in the craft, and her only lover was murdered by Loddlaen. In later books, she aids Dallandra and Salamander, as well as restores the horn that summons the Shadow Isle.

=== Loddlaen ===
The half-human, half-elven son of Aderyn and Dallandra, Loddlaen was abandoned by his mother almost immediately after his birth. He was raised by his father, who doted upon him and even instructed him in sorcery. Although he has a natural talent for magic, Loddlaen is imbalanced because his foetal development was interrupted when his mother Dallandra first travels to the world of the guardians. He is eventually driven mad by the manipulation of an evil sorcerer who wishes Rhodry Maelwaedd dead, he foments rebellion in the province of Eldidd.

=== Dallandra ===
An elven dweomermaster. Although she was initially happily married to Aderyn, she left him and their son to be with her lover, Evandar, and to pursue her work of helping the race of Guardians incarnate. Later, she has a daughter with Calonderiel, an elven warleader or banadar.

== People of the Rhiddaer ==
=== Niffa ===
A girl from the Rhiddaer. Sister to Jahdo. Dallandra's apprentice.

Other incarnations: Lillorigga, Lanmara

=== Jahdo ===
Boy from the Rhiddaer. Accompanies Meer, the blind bard, in search of Meer's brother. Brother to Niffa.

== Guardians ==
=== Evandar ===
Evandar, who possesses near-limitless dweomer ability, is the leader of the Bright Court (also called the Seelie Host). He is Alshandra's husband and Elessario's father-figure. He seems to enjoy meddling in the affairs of mortals, to the point that some Gel Da Thae worship him as a god.

=== Alshandra ===
Alshandra is Evandar's wife, and Elessario's mother-figure. When Elessario becomes the first Guardian to incarnate, Alshandra's grief and rage drive her mad. In an attempt to get Elessario back, Alshandra poses as a goddess to the Horsekin, setting off a chain of events that causes the first Horsekin invasion of Deverry.

=== Elessario ===
Alshandra's daughter.

=== Shaetano ===
Evandar's younger brother, and leader of the Dark (Unseelie) Court

== Others ==
=== Meer ===
Blind bard of the Gel da'Thae. Had a geas laid upon him by his mother to find his brother.

=== Otho ===
A dwarven silversmith. He was exiled from dwarven lands because he would not pay a debt. Bellyra is considered by most to be the only person he ever loved. He created the first of many silver daggers, as well as the ring used to enslave Arzosah. He also built the silver box used to contain the curse on Maryn.

=== Arzosah ===
A copper, green and black dragon who dwells in the far northern mountains. Her true name, Arzosah Sothy Lorezohaz, is inscribed on a ring which gives its owner the power to command her. Compelled by the power of her true name, she assists in the defence of Cengarn. Rhodry and she become friends, and he gives her the ring at the end of "Days of Blood and Fire", freeing her. In "The Fire Dragon" Arzosah considers him her first true friend. In later books Rori (Rhodry's dragon name) has become Arzosah's mate in his dragon form and has dragon children by her.

== See also ==
- Deverry Cycle
- Katharine Kerr
