= Darkspell =

1987 novel by Katharine Kerr

- Author: Katharine Kerr
- Language: English
- Series: Deverry Cycle
- Genre: Fantasy
- Publication date: 1987
- Publication place: United States
- Media type: Print (Hardcover, Paperback); Audiobook; E-book
- Preceded by: Daggerspell
- Followed by: Dawnspell

Darkspell is a novel by Katharine Kerr published in 1987.

== Synopsis ==
Rhodry is sent into exile by his brother Rhys, the Gwerbret of Aberwyn, and becomes a mercenary soldier called a “silver dagger.” Jill goes with him; they become involved in a dark dweomerman’s plot to steal the Great Stone of the West, a magical gemstone which guides the conscience of Deverry’s king.

== Reception ==
Dave Langford reviewed Darkspell for White Dwarf #99, and stated that "if the language is fake-Celtic, why the Old English? (To give a warm glow to D&D fans, I suppose.) I lost heart at this point."

== Reviews ==
- Review by Faren Miller (1987) in Locus, #320 September 1987
- Review by Sue Thomason (1988) in Vector 144
- Review by Nik Morton (1989) in Paperback Inferno, #81
- Review? [German] by Gatita Kirchweger (2001) in Future Magic, Januar 2001

== See also ==
- Deverry
