= Robert Reece (disambiguation) =

Robert Reece was a playwright.

Robert Reece may also refer to:

- Bob Reece (born 1951), American former baseball player

== See also ==
- Robert Rees (disambiguation)
- Robert Rhys, former editor of Barn
