= O'Ree =

O'Ree is a surname. Notable people with the surname include:

- Matt O'Ree (born 1972) U.S. musician, member of Bon Jovi
- Willie O'Ree (born 1935) Canadian ice hockey player, first black player to play in the NHL

== See also ==
- Owen Rees (18th century) of T.N. Longman and O. Rees
- Matt O'Ree Band, U.S. music band formed by Matt O'Ree
- Oree (disambiguation)
- Ree (disambiguation)
