= Andrew Grassie =

Scottish artist

Andrew Grassie (born 1966) is a Scottish artist. Grassie paints highly detailed and self-referential tempera on paper copies of photographs.

He was educated at St Martins School of Art and the Royal College of Art.

Grassie's work of the late 1990s and early 2000s included tempera on paper studies of the gallery interior in which they were exhibited (1997), and small copies of photographs of 1960s minimalist sculpture (2002).

In 2004, he won a "Special Merit" award at the 23rd John Moores Painting Prize for his work The Making of the Painting, which shows the space in which he made the painting. In 2005 he had a solo exhibition at Tate Britain, as part of the Art Now series. He exhibited tiny paintings of an imaginary "rehang" of works from the gallery. To make the paintings Grassie moved the actual works to the exhibition space, photographed them, and then made copies of the photographs in tempera.

His paintings have been praised for being "disorienting" and "melancholy", and criticised for consisting of "bureaucratic ironies".

His works are held in the collection of the Tate and the United Kingdom Government Art Collection. He lectures at City and Guilds of London Art School.

Andrew Grassie is represented by Maureen Paley in London.
