= Hugh Mendes =

English painter (born 1955)

- Born: 11 November 1955 (age 70); Hostert, North Rhine-Westphalia, Germany
- Occupation: Artist
- Years active: 2001–present
- Website: hughmendes.com

Hugh Mendes (born 11 November 1955) is a British contemporary painter. He was born in the British Military Hospital in Hostert, Germany, and grew up in Canada and the UK. Mendes graduated from Chelsea School of Art with a BA in painting in 1978, and from City and Guilds of London Art School with an MA in painting in 2001. He lives and works in London, and is represented by Charlie Smith London. When he is not painting in his studio in Hackney, Mendes teaches at City and Guilds of London Art School, Newlyn School of Art and London Buddhist Centre.

Mendes has exhibited internationally and his work is also held in collections around the world. Recent solo shows include 'Mendes and the Modernists' at Austin/Desmond Fine Art, 'Mendes & Co.(Deceased)' at James Freeman Gallery, and 'Mendes and his Mentors' at The Tub.
