= Reis =

Reis may refer to:

== Currency ==
- Brazilian real (old) (plural réis), the currency of Brazil until 1942
- Portuguese Indian rupia (subdivided into réis), the currency of Portuguese India until 1958
- Portuguese real (plural reis or réis), the currency of Portugal from c. 1430 until 1910

== People ==
- Reis (surname), a Portuguese and German surname
- Reis (footballer, born 1988), Deivdy Reis Marques do Nascimento, Brazilian football forward
- Reis (footballer, born 1993), Isnairo Reis Silva Morais, Brazilian football midfielder
- Hakan Ayik, also known as Hakan Reis, a Turkish-Australian criminal
- Max Reis (born 2007), German racing driver
- Piri Reis, born Muhiddin Piri (c. 1470–1553), an Ottoman Turkish cartographer, admiral, navigator, and corsair

== Places ==
- Reis Township, Polk County, Minnesota, U.S.A.
- Dirce Reis, São Paulo, Brazil
- Angra dos Reis, Rio de Janeiro, Brazil
- Reis Magos, former name of Nova Almeida, Espírito Santo, Brazil
- Caldas de Reis, Spain
- Reis Magos, Goa, India

== Other uses ==
- Reis (film), a biography film from 2017 about the President of Turkey, Recep Tayyip Erdoğan
- Reis (military rank), an Ottoman military rank and obscure Lebanese/Syrian noble title
  - Reis ül-Küttab, senior administrative post in the Ottoman government
  - Reis-ul-ulema, the head of a riyasat, an executive body of Balkan Islamic communities

== See also ==
- Rhys (surname)
- Imperial, royal and noble ranks
- Reece (disambiguation)
- Reese (disambiguation)
- Reyes (disambiguation)
- Rees (disambiguation)
- Reus (disambiguation)
- Rhees (disambiguation)
- Ríos (disambiguation)
