= David Meredith Reese =

American physician (1800–1861)

David Meredith Reese (1800–May 13, 1861) was an American medical doctor and skeptic who worked at various institutions and wrote about his observations including on the Yellow Fever epidemic in New York in 1818.

He was born in Baltimore. He graduated from the University of Maryland. He was a "Vaccine Physician" in Baltimore in 1824 and "Censor". He was a professor of medicine at Castleton College in Vermont in 1841 and 1842; Professor of the Institutes of Medicine and Medical Jurisprudence at Washington University in Baltimore from 1842-45 and Professor of Medicine at Albany Medical College. He was a resident physician at Bellevue Hospital in New York and a founder of the New York Academy of Medicine. He served as Vice-President of the American Medical Association in 1857. He was a professor of Practice of Medicine at New York Medical College, in 1860. He edited the American edition of “Cooper’s Dictionary of Practical Surgery” published in 1844. He was an editor for the American Medical Gazette in New York. He ied in New York May 13, 1861.

Reese worked as a medical doctor at the Bellevue Hospital until 1849. He was a skeptical of the many "isms" of his day. He had heavily criticized quackery in his book Humbugs of New York (1838). He was highly critical of phrenology.

Reese's book was published several years before Extraordinary Popular Delusions and the Madness of Crowds (1841) and has been described as early debunking work.

In 1835, Reese published Letters to the Hon. William Jay. A Reply to his 'Inquiry Into The American Colonization and American Anti-Slavery Movements, in which he supports the efforts of the American Colonization Society.

== Publications ==
- Letters to the Hon. William Jay. A Reply to his 'Inquiry Into The American Colonization and American Anti-Slavery Movements (1835)
- Phrenology Known by Its Fruits (1836)
- Humbugs of New-York: Being a Remonstrance Against Popular Delusion, Whether in Science, Philosophy, or Religion (1838)
- Medical Lexicon of Modern Terminology (1848)
- Elements of Zoology, Or, Natural History of Animals (1849)
