= Reese Fernandez-Ruiz =

Filipino social entrepreneur

- Born: Therese Clarence Arellano Chua Fernandez-Ruiz; 1985 (age 40–41); Philippines
- Education: Degree in Management from Ateno de Manila University
- Occupations: President and Co-Founder of Rags2Riches
- Years active: 2007-present

Reese Fernandez-Ruiz (born 1985) is a Filipino social entrepreneur and President and Founding Partner of Rags2Riches, a sustainable fashion enterprise established in 2007. The company aims to empower Philippine-based artisans, fashion and home products that follow environmental ethics principles, and alleviate poverty in Payatas, Quezon City and other communities around Metro Manila.

== Biography ==
She was born Therese Clarence Arellano Chua Fernandez-Ruiz in the Philippines in 1985. She was raised by her mother, a missionary. Her mother’s work exposed Fernandez-Ruiz to the poverty in the Philippines.

== Education ==
Fernandez-Ruiz attended Ateneo de Manila University where she studied management. She attended certificate courses for Sustainable Fashion in Central Saint Martins University of the Arts London and Art & Science of Systems Change in Harvard Kennedy School.

== Career ==
Through her college organization, Fernandez-Ruiz volunteered to teach math, science, and reading skills in Payatas, a community in Quezon City, Philippines and home to one of the largest dump sites in the country. After graduation, she co-founded Rags2Riches together with a group of young professionals while working as the Program Assistant for the Youth Leadership & Social Entrepreneurship Program of the Ateneo School of Government.

=== Rags2Riches (R2R) ===
Fernandez-Ruiz co-founded Rags2Riches after seeing rug-weavers (mostly women) in Payatas receive little profit for rugs they crafted from cloth and scrap foraged from the Quezon City dump site, due to middlemen controlling their supplies and sales. Fernandez-Ruiz, together with the founders of R2R, sought the help of fashion designer Rajo Laurel and other designers to co-design products together with the artisans. Rags2Riches created links with factories and warehouses to provide the artisans with fabric scrap materials and opportunity to sell their products directly to customers. The company also provides artisans with education in personal finance, nutrition, and health insurance. Rags2Riches has recycled over 800 tons of scrap material and has a production facility implementing zero wastepractices.

== Awards ==
In 2015, she was on Forbes 30 Social Entrepreneurs Under 30, and she was named a Young Laureate for the Rolex Awards for Enterprise in 2010.

== See also ==
- Social entrepreneurship in South Asia
