= John Charles Lewis Sparkes =

John Charles Lewis Sparkes (c.1833 – 11 December 1907) was an English educationalist and college head.

Born in Brixton, Lambeth UK. He trained at the National Art Training Schools as an art teacher. As an educator, he initiated innovative policies at Lambeth School of Art (later the South London Technical School of Art) where he was Superintendent of Studies. Married in 1868 in Lambeth to Catherine Adelaide Sparkes (1842–1891), Catherine was also a leading Art Potter who exhibited at the annual exhibitions of Howell James & Co. In 1870, Henry Doulton became a mentor to Lambeth School of Art and Sparkes proposed that Lambeth and Doultons Art Pottery collaborate. Some prominent students of this collaborative work include the Barlow Sisters who began under Doulton in 1871.

He was in charge of the Royal College of Art (including National Art Training School) 1875 to 1898, with the title of Headmaster from 1875 to 1881, and Principal from 1881 to 1898.

== Works ==
- A Handbook to the Practice of Painting (1877)
- The Classical Composition of John Flaxman, Sculptor (1879)
- Hints on Pottery Painting (1885)
- A Manual of Artistic Anatomy (1888)
- Wild Flowers in Art and Nature (1894)
- Potters: their Arts and Crafts (1897)
