= Jeremy Rees =

British arts administrator

Jeremy Rees (8 May 1937 – 12 December 2003) was a British arts administrator. He was the founder of the Arnolfini Centre for the Contemporary Arts in Bristol and its director from its opening in 1961 until 1986.

Born in Bridgwater, he was the son of the artist Jean Rees (1914–2004) and Glyndwr Rees (1905–2001). He was married to Annabel Lawson, daughter of Sir Neil and Lady Gwen Lawson, and had two daughters, Natasha and Justine.
