= Rees-Mogg =

Rees-Mogg may refer to:

- Anne Rees-Mogg, film director and teacher
- Annunziata Rees-Mogg (born 1979), British Brexit Party politician and MEP
- Jacob Rees-Mogg (born 1969), British Conservative politician and MP
- William Rees-Mogg (1928–2012), British journalist and life peer; father of Jacob and Annunziata
