= Robert Rees (journalist) =

American journalist

Robert Morrison "Bob" Rees (1938 – November 1, 2005) was an advertising executive and journalist who wrote for the Honolulu Weekly and Honolulu Advertiser.

Rees was born in San Diego. After graduating from Stanford University and the University of California at Berkeley, Rees worked as an advertising executive with Doyle Dane Bernbach on campaigns for Volkswagen, Porsche, and Audi. He later moved to Hawaii, teaching at the University of Hawaii at Manoa. Rees was a freelance writer, especially for the alternative paper, the Honolulu Weekly. He also hosted the Hawaii Public Radio program Talk of the Islands and television show Counterpoint.

In his journalistic career in Hawaii, Rees often stirred controversy, questioning among others, politicians and certain figures in the Hawaiian sovereignty movement. For his work in Honolulu Weekly, Rees received two AAN awards. He died in Kailua, Oahu.
