= Katharine Kerr =

American writer

- Born: October 3, 1944 (age 81); Cleveland, Ohio, U.S.
- Education: Stanford University
- Occupation: Author
- Spouse: Howard Kerr
- Writing career
- Pen name: Kathryn Jordan
- Language: English
- Genres: Fantasy; science fiction
- Notable work: Deverry Cycle
- Website: deverry.com

Katharine Kerr (born October 3, 1944) is an American science fiction and fantasy novelist, best known for her series of Celtic-influenced high fantasy novels set in the fictional land of Deverry.

== Biography ==
Katharine Kerr was born in Cleveland, Ohio; her maiden name is Katharine Nancy Brahtin. She describes her family feeling more like "British-in-exile" than American. She describes her inability to spell properly using either the British or American systems as a result of having been taught to read solely with British books. While still a schoolgirl, her family moved to Santa Barbara, California. In 1969, she moved to the San Francisco Bay Area, eventually moving to San Francisco itself. She spent time studying at Stanford University but dropped out in the mid-1960s. She then worked in some low-paying jobs, including work at a post office.

In 1973, she met up with Howard Kerr, an old friend of hers from secondary school; they were married that same year. In 1979, a friend gave Katharine her first fantasy role-playing game. This gift led her to a fascination with the gaming and fantasy field, which in turn led her to write articles for gaming magazines. She spent time as a contributing editor to Dragon magazine and contributed to gaming modules for both TSR, Inc. and Chaosium. She co-authored the adventure Legacy of Blood for Dungeons & Dragons, as well as adventures for the Pendragon role-playing game.

Katharine Kerr now dedicates herself exclusively to fiction.

== Bibliography ==
=== Deverry novels ===
See Deverry cycle for a synopsis of Deverry.

The novels of Deverry are perhaps Kerr's best-known works. Originally envisioned as a short story or novella, the project grew into a series of sixteen full novels. Kerr has a contract for two additional full novels in the series.

The series is written in a non-linear style: the principal narrative is frequently interrupted by flashbacks to events that occurred decades, or even centuries, before. These flashbacks concern the prior incarnations of characters in the principal narrative, and provide insight into the relationships of the characters in their current incarnations.

Kerr has likened the series to a play, breaking the story into several acts:

- Act one: Deverry
1. Daggerspell (1986)
2. Darkspell (1987) – later reissued in an "author's definitive edition" ISBN 978-0-553-56888-2
3. The Bristling Wood (1989) – United States title; issued in the United Kingdom as Dawnspell: The Bristling Wood ISBN 978-0-553-28581-9
4. The Dragon Revenant (1990) – US title; issued in the UK as Dragonspell: The Southern Sea ISBN 978-0-246-13558-2
- Act two: The Westlands
1. A Time of Exile (1991) ISBN 978-0-553-29813-0
2. A Time of Omens (1992) ISBN 978-0-553-29011-0
3. Days of Blood and Fire (1993) – US title; issued in the UK as A Time of War ISBN 978-0-586-21197-7
4. Days of Air and Darkness (1994) – US title; issued in the UK as A Time of Justice ISBN 978-0-00-647859-1
- Act three: The Dragon Mage
1. The Red Wyvern (1997) ISBN 978-0-553-57264-3
2. The Black Raven (1998) ISBN 978-0-553-57919-2
3. The Fire Dragon (2000) ISBN 978-0-553-58247-5
- Act four: The Silver Wyrm
1. The Gold Falcon (2006) – US title; issued in the UK as the fourth book of The Dragon Mage ISBN 978-0-7564-0419-2
2. The Spirit Stone (2007) – US title; issued in the UK as the fifth book of The Dragon Mage ISBN 978-0-7564-0477-2
3. The Shadow Isle (2008) – US title; issued in the UK as the sixth book of The Dragon Mage ISBN 978-0-7564-0552-6
4. The Silver Mage (2009) – US title; issued in the UK as the seventh book of The Dragon Mage ISBN 0-7564-0587-4
- Act five: The Justice War
1. Sword of Fire (2020)

=== Polar City ===
1. Polar City Blues (1990)
2. Polar City Nightmare (2000) – with Kate Daniel

=== Nola O'Grady ===
1. License to Ensorcell (February 2011)
2. Water to Burn (August 2011)
3. Apocalypse to Go (February 2012)
4. Love on the Run (August 2012)

=== The Pinch ===
- Palace (1996) – with Mark Kreighbaum
- The Eyes of God - by Mark Kreighbaum, sequel to Palace

=== The Runemaster books ===
- Sorcerer's Luck (2013) ISBN 978-0-9790-5739-7
- Sorcerer's Feud (August 2014)

=== Other novels ===
- Resurrection (1992) ISBN 978-0-553-29834-5
- Freeze Frames (1995) ISBN 978-0-8125-5173-0
- Flickers writing as Kathryn A. Jordan ISBN 9781601834997
- Snare (2003) ISBN 978-0-8125-5174-7

=== Anthologies ===
- Weird Tales from Shakespeare – Fanfiction based on Shakespeare's works (1994) – with Martin H. Greenberg
- Enchanted Forests (1995) – with Martin H. Greenberg ISBN 978-0-88677-672-5
- The Shimmering Door (1996) – with Martin H. Greenberg (issued in the UK as Sorceries)
- Sorceries (1997)

=== Short stories ===
- "Cui Bono?" (1994) (collected in Mike Resnick's alternate history anthology Alternate Outlaws)
