= Kiera Bennett =

British artist

Kiera Bennett (born 1971) is a British artist.

Bennett was born in Oldham and studied at The Royal College of Art in London (2000–2002), at the Ruskin School of Art in Oxford (1990–1993) and at Mid-Cheshire College of Art and Design in Northwich (1989–1990). Predominantly working in painting (but also collage) Bennett has shown internationally and currently lives and works in London.

Past shows include 'New Contemporaries' in 2002, 'Collage' at the Bloomberg Space, London in 2004, where Bennett showed alongside artists including Chris Ofili, Marcel Duchamp, Robert Rauschenberg and Max Ernst, the John Moores Painting Prize 23, at the Walker Art Gallery in Liverpool during 2004, 'Fuckin Brilliant/Maji Yabai, Tokyo Wondersite Gallery, Shibuya, Tokyo in 2006, 'Bad Moon Rising', a solo show at Rockwell Gallery London in 2007 and 'Precious Things', Highlanes Gallery, Drogheda, Ireland in 2008, a group show curated by Graham Crowley, former professor of painting at The Royal College of Art, other artists included Ansel Krut, Varda Caivano and Paul Housley. She also received The Cocheme Fellowship at the Byam Shaw School of Art in 2004 (concluding with a show alongside artist Ryan Gander). Her work is in various collections including those of Mario Testino, Cornelia Parker and Julian Opie.

Bennett has also been the subject of various works by the British artist Julian Opie.
