= Reece =

Reece derives from the Welsh name Rhys. It may refer to:

- Reece (name), people with the given name or surname
- Reece, Kansas, United States, an unincorporated community
- Mount Reece, Antarctic Peninsula
- Reece Valley, Queen Maud Land, Antartica
- Reece Group, an Australian company
- Reece Power Station, Tasmania, Australia, a hydroelectric power station

== See also ==
- A-Reece, stage name of South African rapper and record producer Lehlogonolo Ronald Mataboge (born 1997)
- Uncle Reece, stage name of American Christian hip hop musician Maurice Hicks Jr. (born 1984)
- Recce (disambiguation)
- Rees (disambiguation)
- Reese (disambiguation)
- Reis (disambiguation)
- Rhees (disambiguation)
- Rhys, a surname
