= Rees-Jones =

Rees-Jones is a compound surname of Welsh origin. It is composed of the names Rees and Jones. People with this name include

- Deryn Rees-Jones, Anglo-Welsh poet
- Sarah Rees Jones, British historian
- Trevor Rees-Jones (businessman), billionaire, president and CEO of Chief Oil & Gas
- Trevor Rees-Jones (bodyguard) (born 1968), British bodyguard and sole survivor of the car crash that killed Diana, Princess of Wales

== See also ==
- Sir Edgar Rees Jones (1878–1962), Welsh barrister and Liberal Party politician
- Peter Rees Jones (1843–1905), department store founder
