= Jean Rees =

British artist

Jean Rees (1914–2004) was a British artist.

She dedicated the later part of her life to promoting the visual arts in the West of England. A highly accomplished landscape artist in her own right, exhibited at the Royal West of England Academy (RWA), the Royal Academy of Arts, The Royal Institute of Painters in Water Colours, the Medici Gallery, Penwith Gallery, Newlyn Gallery and many others, she is noted for her distinctive, abstractive approach to colour, light and form inspired by the landscapes of the Mediterranean and the western counties of Cornwall, Devon and Somerset.

Jean Rees (née Jean Lamb) commenced her career by obtaining a National Diploma in Textile Design from the Hastings School of Art, Hastings, East Sussex. Upon completion of this course she embarked on a four-year Open Scholarship with the Royal College of Art but, in 1935, married Glyndwr Rees, moved with him to Somerset and spent the next few years in freelance textile design while raising three children.

In 1946 she co-founded the Bridgwater Arts Centre and later became its Chairman. This was an important post-war mile-stone for it was Britain's first art centre, funded by the Arts Council for many years. She was a founder member of the Chandos Society of Artists, later becoming Chairman, and also chaired Artists 303.

In 1988 she was elected to the committee of the Royal West of England Academy, Bristol and in 1989 was voted Artist's Chairman, holding this position for 3 years. During her tenure she curated two important exhibitions: the acclaimed "Scottish Art in the 20th Century" and "Painters from Cornwall", which marked a time of significant change for RWA. Shortly before her death she was made an Honorary Academician for her services to the RWA.

Her paintings are in the permanent collections of the RWA, University of Bath, Somerset County Council and in private collections in Europe, USA and Canada. A retrospective exhibition entitled "A Vision of Landscape and Light: Jean Rees Hon RWA 1914 - 2004" was staged at Bridgwater Arts Centre and Royal West of England Academy during 2006, receiving enthusiastic praise from several hundred visitors. The exhibition was accompanied by an illustrated biography which is available on request.

Her son Jeremy Rees, founded the Arnolfini in Bristol in 1961.
