= Re =

Re or RE may refer to:

== Arts, media and entertainment ==
- ...Re, a 2016 Indian Kannada-language film
- Realencyclopädie der classischen Altertumswissenschaft, a German encyclopedia of classical scholarship
- Royal Society of Painter-Printmakers, whose fellows may use the Post-nominal letters RE
- "Re;", the series finale of season 2 of Code Geass

=== Music ===
- Re, the second syllable of the scale in solfège; maps to D in traditional fixed do
- Rishabha (svara), the long form of the syllable रे (Re), and the second of the seven svaras in Hindustani and Carnatic music
- Re: (band), a musical duo based in Canada and the US

==== Albums ====
- Re (Café Tacuba album), 1994
- Re (Les Rita Mitsouko album), 1990
- Re., by Aya Ueto, 2004
- Re: (EP), by Kard, 2022

=== Gaming ===
- Resident Evil, a horror game franchise
- RE Engine, a software framework created by Capcom

== Language ==
- More, re, and bre, interjections and/or vocative particles in Greek, Albanian, Turkish, and some Romance and Slavic languages
- Re (kana), れ/レ, Japanese syllables
- Re (Armenian), Ր/ր
- Re or Ri (cuneiform),
- RE: or Re:, a standard email subject line prefix

== Places and transportation ==
- Re Municipality, a former municipality in Vestfold county
- Re, Vestland, a village in Gloppen municipality, Vestland county, Norway
- Re, Piedmont, an Italian municipality
- Île de Ré, an island off the west coast of France
  - Le Bois-Plage-en-Ré, a commune on that island
- Re di Anfo, a torrent (seasonal stream) in Italy
- Re di Gianico, Re di Niardo, Re di Sellero, and Re di Tredenus, torrents in the Val Camonica, Lombardy, Italy
- Réunion (ISO 3166-1 code), a French overseas department and island in the Indian Ocean
- Rewari Junction railway station (station code: RE), Haryana, India
- Regional-Express, a type of regional train in Germany, Luxembourg and Austria
- Aer Arann (1970–2014) or Stobart Air (2014–2021), by IATA code, a defunct regional airline based in Dublin, Ireland
- Realpha, a 1960s Rhodesian Formula One racing car

== Science and technology ==
- Effective reproduction number, in epidemiology
- Relative effectiveness or RE factor, of an explosive's demolition power
- Reynolds number (Re), a dimensionless quantity in fluid mechanics used to help predict flow patterns
- Rhenium (symbol Re), a chemical element
- Reference pressure (Re), as sound pressure level
- Reference pressure (Re), in underwater acoustics
- R_{E}, Earth radius

=== Computing and mathematics ===
- RE (complexity) (recursively enumerable), a complexity class of decision problems
  - Recursively enumerable (r.e.), in computability theory
- Regular expression, a sequence of characters to match text against a specified pattern
- Re, the function from a complex number to its real part
- .re, the Internet country code top-level domain for Réunion
- RE (character set), short for HP Roman Extension

== People ==
- Ré (futsal player), Portuguese futsal player
- Andrea Re (born 1963), Italian rower
- Cayetano Ré (1938–2013), Paraguayan footballer
- Christopher Ré, American computer scientist
- Davide Re, Italian runner
- Germán Ré, Argentine footballer
- Giovanni Battista Re (born 1934), Italian cardinal
- Maximiliano Ré, Argentine-Italian footballer
- Paul Ré, American artist and writer
- Savannah Ré, Canadian singer-songwriter
- Vincenzo Re, Italian scenic designer

== Political organizations ==
- Renew Europe, a political group in the European Parliament
- Renovación Española, a former Spanish monarchist political party

== Religion ==
- Religious education (RE), the study of religion
- Ra or Re, the ancient Egyptian sun god

== Other uses ==
- Royal Engineers, a part of the British Army

== See also ==
- In re, Latin for 'in the matter of...'
- King of Italy (Italian: Re d'Italia)
- Il re, Italian-language opera
- Rhee (disambiguation)
- Ree (disambiguation)
- Res (disambiguation)
- Ra (disambiguation)
