= Reese =

Reese may refer to:

== Places ==
=== Germany ===
- Reese, Germany, a hamlet in Lower Saxony on the River Aue

=== United States ===
- Reese, Michigan, United States, a community east of Saginaw
- Reese, Pennsylvania, United States, a community in Blair County
- Reese, Texas, United States, a community in Cherokee County, in East Texas
- Reese Center, Texas, United States, an area west of Lubbock
  - Reese Technology Center, the former installation making up part of Reese Center

== Other uses ==
- Reese (given name), a page for people with the given name Reese
- Reese (surname), a page for people with the surname Reese
- Reese, a ringname of Ron Reis (born 1970), American professional wrestler
- Reese House, an historic home in Hendersonville, North Carolina
- Reese's Peanut Butter Cups American candy marketed by The Hershey Company named after H. B. Reese
  - Reese's Pieces, a type of coated candy
  - Reese's Whipps, a type of candy bar
- Reese bass, a synthesized bass sound extensively used by electronic producer Kevin Saunderson
- Reese, a doll featured in the Groovy Girls doll line, by Manhattan Toy
- "Reese", a song by Big Red Machine from the album How Long Do You Think It's Gonna Last?

== See also ==
- Justice Reese (disambiguation)
- Reece (disambiguation)
- Rees (disambiguation)
- Reis (disambiguation)
- Rhees (disambiguation)
- Rhys, a Welsh name
