= Rees =

Rees may refer to:

== Places ==
- Rees, Germany, a city on the lower Rhine
- Rees, Illinois, United States, a community in the Jacksonville, Illinois micropolitan area
- Rees River, a river in New Zealand
- 4587 Rees, an Amor asteroid

== Other uses ==
- Rees (surname), a Welsh surname
- Rees algebra, named after the mathematician David Rees
- Rees's Cyclopædia, a nineteenth-century encyclopedia, particularly rich in coverage of science and technology

== See also ==
- Justice Rees (disambiguation)
- Caroline Ruutz-Rees, British American educator and suffragist
- Ree (disambiguation)
- Reece (disambiguation)
- Reese (disambiguation)
- Reis (disambiguation)
- Rhees (disambiguation)
- Rhys, a surname
