= Rhee Brothers =

Rhee Brothers may refer to:

- Rhee Bros., Inc., a food importing company in the USA
- Chong Chul Rhee, Chong Hyup Rhee, and Chong Yoon Rhee, masters of Rhee Taekwon-Do in Australia
- Simon Rhee and Phillip Rhee, martial artists and actors in the USA
