= Reece Willison =

Scottish footballer

Personal information
- Date of birth: 27 May 1999 (age 27)
- Place of birth: Glasgow, Scotland
- Height: 6 ft 2 in (1.88 m)
- Position: Goalkeeper

Youth career
- Aberdeen
- St Mirren
- –2019: Celtic

Senior career*
| Years | Team | Apps | (Gls) |
| 2019–2020 | Airdrieonians | 4 | (0) |
| 2020–2021 | Alloa Athletic | 6 | (0) |
- * Club domestic league appearances and goals as of 22:59, 30 April 2021 (UTC)

Reece Willison (born 27 May 1999) is a Scottish footballer who plays as a goalkeeper.

== Early life ==
Willison was born in Glasgow.

== Career ==
Willison had spells in the youth teams of Aberdeen, St Mirren and Celtic, before joining Airdrieonians on a pre-contract agreement in May 2019. He was released by the club at the end of the 2019–20 season, having made four appearances. He joined Alloa Athletic on 17 October 2020, and made his debut that day in a 1–0 defeat to Greenock Morton.
