= Alex Gene Morrison =

English painter

Alex Gene Morrison is a contemporary painter and video/animator born in Birmingham in 1975. He studied painting at the Royal College of Art between 2000 and 2002.

He had a solo show at Stella Vine's Gallery Rosy Wilde in 2004. He has had solo shows at Rockwell Gallery, London, in 2006 at The Fishmarket Gallery, Northampton, in 2007, Chapter Arts Centre, Cardiff, in 2008, and Charlie Smith Gallery, London, in 2010. His painting was exhibited in the John Moores Painting Prize in Liverpool in 2009. Morrison's work has been shown internationally.
