= Amikam Toren =

British artist (born 1945)

- Born: 1945 (age 80–81); Jerusalem, Israel
- Known for: Painting, Sculpture, Mixed media, Moving image
- Movement: Conceptual Art, Post Conceptual, Arte Povera, Minimalism, Pop Art

Amikam Toren (born 1945 in Jerusalem) is a British artist whose works explores painting, sculpture, moving image and mixed media. He was the co-founding editor of magazine, Wallpaper from 1974 to 1976." He is regarded as one of the most important and interesting conceptual artists of the 20th century to work in the UK. Arrived in London in 1968, he gained artistic prominence in the 1970s.

Toren held his first public exhibition in London at Alexandra Palace in 1972 and has exhibited extensively ever since. Following hundreds of shows, over four continents, he has been cited by journalists and academics as, "An artist of international importance" And criticised by some for making work too political to be shown in public galleries.

== Genre ==
Toren's work has been described as: conceptual, post conceptual, ideas based and "in a poignant dialogue with a compelling variety of international art movements, such as Arte Povera, Minimalism, and Pop Art." It has also been said that his work, "eludes categorisation and stubbornly refuses to be slotted with any current artistic trend."

His work, "of profound intellectual rigor and salience," frequently employs strict 'propositional' rules of production but is nevertheless often deeply moving, with a strong aesthetic beauty. For instance, in one of his limited prints, A User's Guide to Married Life – now owned by the United Kingdom Government – the Whitechapel Gallery has said, "he transforms the bland graphics of signage into a tender expression of the emotional values of a shared existence."

Toren's work explores the conceptual and material framework that defines art, the relation between form and content, object and representation. Though atypical in conceptual art, sensuality and materiality are highly important in his work. Toren has said, "In my nature, I'm a very sensuous person. Conceptual art was fascinating to me, but I had to incorporate it into something I could touch."

At the core of Toren's work lies his interest in, "the possibility (or impossibility) of representation." That driving force, Toren has said, "gave rise to my representational/tautological paintings which propose a unity between form and content."

== Philosophical interests and modes of production ==
Toren often makes artworks in series – or iterations – which share a common method of production. Each series has an overarching name. Each separate piece within that series has an individual sub-name. Much as the taxonomic groups: Family>Genus>Species in biology. For instance:

- Series name, Armchair Paintings.
- Individual work name: Armchair Painting, Untitled: Free Palestine.
- Individual work name: Armchair Painting, Untitled: Black Lives Matter.

These 'series' can contain as few as dozen or as many as one hundred individual artworks. Toren may return to work on new individual pieces within a series over months or decades.

In many series of works, Toren uses an object as both the subject of a representation and as the physical material with which the representation is made.

For instance, in his series Neither A Painting Nor A Chair, "Toren filed down chairs, until they resembled fragile skeletal remains of the original objects."* He mixed the resulting sawdust with a clear binder to create a self-made 'paint', with which he then painted images of the chair onto canvases. These images, painted out of sawdust, are shown in the gallery alongside the chair's skeletal remnants. "In this way, part of the object, becomes both material and propositional representation."

This technique, (painting an image of an object, with ground up particles of itself), which Toren invented; collapses the traditionally separated object<>representation in art, into one entity. In this way, Toren's work refutes the art-historically accepted maxim that; "Representation excludes its own subject."

Toren's sculptural work is often linked to or derived from his representational paintings. Much of his sculptural work uses ready-made or found objects: ironing boards, drawing boards, chairs, clothes-horses, or organic materials like orange peel, banana skins or olive stones. The objects are used in a way which "simultaneously questions and enhances the ordinary with a bold sculptural presence."* It is often impacted by his tautological interests.

Of this Toren has said, "Philosophically speaking, tautology is an idea but an impossibility in the real world (a rose is a rose, is a rose, is a rose – Gertrude Stein). Attempting to bring tautology through art into the world of objects/paintings has been part of my job... Deconstructing painting as an art form becomes a necessary outcome of my approach to representation."

== Reputation and reception ==
Toren is widely considered "one of the greatest living British conceptual artists." Over hundreds of printed reviews, monographs, thesis and academic critiques, his works have been - almost universally - well received by art critics and scholars.

He has been called "the artist's artist," and his impact on generations of visual artists and cultural producers has been often cited.

== Criticism and banned works ==
Some of Toren's works have proved too political or too shocking to be shown publicly. For instance, his Armchair painting, Untitled: Kill Rushdie was made in 1990 but was unable to be shown in Britain until twenty-eight years later in 2018.

Of the phrases contained in some of his works, Toren has said they should not be read as statements of the artist's beliefs, but as reflections of the time and environment in which he works – and that, some he supports and others he abhors.

In this way, Toren believes in the viewer's intelligence to understand the difference between an artist creating cultural critique and an artist creating propaganda.

The phrases Toren uses in some works, which may be: beautiful, tender, celebratory, or disturbing, comment on how we move through a culture and environment, that sometimes reflects our own views and morals, but at other times is antithetical to our beliefs.
