= Rys (surname) =

Rys, Ryś or Ryš, is a surname. Rysová and Ryšová are feminine forms found in the Czech Republic and Slovakia.

Notable people with the surname include:

- Arkadiusz Ryś (born 1988), Polish footballer
- C. Gus Rys (1912–1980), American politician
- Erwina Ryś-Ferens (1955–2022), Polish speed skater and politician
- Grzegorz Ryś (born 1964), Polish Roman Catholic bishop
- Jan Rys-Rozsévač (1901–1946), Czech politician
- Jiří Rys (born 1992), Czech ice hockey player
- Jacques-Henry Rys (1909–1960), French composer and conductor
- Mieczysław Ryś-Trojanowski (1881–1945), Polish general
- Miro Rys (1957–1977), Czech American soccer player
