= Rhees =

Rhees may refer to:

- Benjamin Rush Rhees (1860–1939) president of the University of Rochester
- Rush Rhees (1905–1989) U.S. philosopher
- Rush Rhees Library, University of Rochester; named after Benjamin Rush Rhees

== See also ==
- Rhys (surname)
- Rhee (disambiguation)
- Reece (disambiguation)
- Reese (disambiguation)
- Rees (disambiguation)
- Reis (disambiguation)
