= Ree =

Ree, Rée or REE may refer to:

== People ==
- the Arikara or Ree, a Native American tribe

=== Persons ===
- Sir Frank Ree (1851–1914), British railway manager
- Hans Ree (born 1944), Dutch chess grandmaster and writer
- Jonathan Rée (born 1948), British philosopher
- Paul Rée (1849–1901), German philosopher, known for his friendship with Friedrich Nietzsche and Lou Andreas-Salomé
- Rimhak Ree (1922–2005), Korean Canadian mathematician
- Ree Drummond (born 1969), American food blogger and television personality

=== Fictional characters ===
- Killashandra Ree, a fictional character in Crystal Singer by Anne McCaffrey

== Places and structures ==
- Lough Ree, a lake in Ireland
- Ree, County Londonderry, a townland in County Londonderry, Northern Ireland; see List of townlands in County Londonderry
- Reedham railway station (Norfolk), England; station code: REE

== Science and technology ==
- Rare-earth element, a group of chemical elements
- Rashba-Edelstein effect 2D spin-charge interconversion effect
- Reduced enamel epithelium, sometimes called reduced dental epithelium, overlies a developing tooth
- Ree or reeve, a female ruff (bird)
- Resting energy expenditure, the amount of calories required for a 24-hour period by the body during resting conditions
- Ruby (programming language) Enterprise Edition

== Organizations ==
- Radio Exterior de España, the Spanish government's international broadcaster
- Red Eléctrica de España, the Spanish electricity transmission system operator
- REE Automotive, a commercial electric vehicle developer and manufacturer

== Other ==
- Re'eh (ראה in Hebrew), the 47th weekly parshah or portion in the annual Jewish cycle of Torah reading and the fourth in the book of Deuteronomy
- Ree, a phrase commonly associated with Pepe the Frog, a comic book character and Internet meme
- Rees's Cyclopædia, a nineteenth-century encyclopedia, particularly rich in coverage of science and technology
- Resident Evil: Extinction, a 2007 film
- Resource and Energy Economics, a journal on energy economics and environmental economics
- Renewable energy education

== See also ==
- O'Ree (surname)
- Rees (disambiguation)
- Rhee (disambiguation)
- Re (disambiguation)
