= Uncle Reece =

American rapper

- Also known as: Uncle Reece
- Born: Maurice Hicks Jr. February 14, 1984 (age 42); Savannah, Georgia, U.S.
- Origin: Jacksonville, Florida
- Genres: Christian hip hop, Christian R&B, urban contemporary gospel, Soul, Reggae
- Occupations: Singer, songwriter
- Instruments: vocals, singer-songwriter
- Years active: 2012–present
- Label: Obed
- Website: unclereece.com

Maurice Hicks Jr. (born February 14, 1984), who goes by the stage name Uncle Reece, is an American Christian hip hop musician. He released his first album, 2014's Bold, with Obed Music Group. This was a Billboard chart breakthrough release.

== Early life ==
Uncle Reece was born Maurice Hicks Jr. on February 14, 1984, in Savannah, Georgia, to a father who served in the military, Maurice Hicks Sr. and his mother Cecilia Anita Hicks. He loves music. He graduated from Florida State University with an Associate degree in Mathematics.

== Music career ==
His music career started in 2012, with the release of "Until I Pass Out" single on March 1 of that year, and it charted at No. 15 on the Hot Gospel Songs chart by Billboard. His second single, "I Cant' Help Myself", would chart at No. 19 on that chart and at No. 48 on the Hot Christian Songs. His first album, Bold, came out on June 3, 2014 on his own label Obed Music. This would chart on two Billboard charts, on the Christian Albums at No. 30 and on the Top Gospel Albums at No. 9. The album received a three and a half star out of five review by Dwayne Lacy of New Release Tuesday, and it comes "highly recommend[ed]" from Daniel Cody at Wade-O Radio. Rea Melissa Davis, writes for AllHipHop, how "Uncle Reece is quite the musical melting pot. With BOLD, Uncle Reece is not confined to the church, and there are no limits or boundaries to the way he can express his praise." He is nominated at the 30th Stellar Awards for the Rap Hip Hop Gospel CD of the Year and New Artist of the Year.

== Discography ==
List of studio albums, with selected chart positions
Title	Album details	Peak chart positions	
Title	Album details	US Chr	US Gos
Bold	Released: June 3, 2014; Label: Obed; CD, digital download	30	9
