= Reece Jones (artist) =

English painter

Reece Jones (born 1976) is a contemporary artist living in London.

Jones was brought up in Norfolk, England. After graduating from Loughborough School of Art and Design he gained an MA from the Royal Academy Schools in 2002. He was one of the founding members of the Rockwell project space in Hackney.

== Work ==
Jones is known for his fragile charcoal drawings, which were built to create often surreal images. His technique can include using sandpaper to create different tones and surfaces.

Solo shows include All Visual Arts, London and 'Control Test' at the Triumph Gallery in Moscow in 2011 (Jones' first solo exhibition outside of London).

Notable group shows include Turps Banana gallery, London; Herrick gallery, London; The Agency Gallery, London; Saatchi Gallery, London; The Royal West of England Academy; Stephane Simoens, Belgium; Voorkamer, Belgium; Drawing Room, London and 'Between the Lines' at All Visual Arts in April 2013.

Reece Jones recently curated The Hair Of The Dog at Block 336 Brixton. He was a selector for Barbican Arts Group Trust's Artworks Open in 2012 & 2013 and curated Terminalia at Charlie Smith London in 2014.

Writing includes the catalogue interview for Mittelland by Jonathan Wateridge. He also lectures in Fine Art - Painting at City & Guilds of London Art School, Kennington.
