= Justice Reese =

Justice Rees or Reese may refer to:

- Grover J. Rees III (born 1951), chief justice of the High Court of American Samoa
- Manoah B. Reese (1839–1917), associate justice of the Nebraska Supreme Court
- Warren J. Rees (1908–1988), associate justice of the Iowa Supreme Court
- William B. Reese (judge) (1793–1859), associate justice of the Tennessee Supreme Court
