= Rys =

Rys or RYS may refer to:

- Ryś, Łódź Voivodeship, Poland
- Rys (surname)

== Sports ==
- Royal Yacht Squadron, a British yacht club
- HC Rys, a Russian hockey team

== Vehicles ==
- KTO Ryś, a Polish wheeled armored fighting vehicle
- ORP Ryś, a Polish submarine
- PZL.54 Ryś, a Polish heavy fighter aircraft
- Ryś (locomotive), a narrow gauge 0-4-0T locomotive class built by Fablok

== Other uses ==
- rys, the ISO 639-3 code for Yaeyama language
- RYS, the ICAO airline designator for Ryanair Sun
- Registered Yoga School, see Yoga Alliance
