= Deverry Cycle =

Series of novels

- Daggerspell; Darkspell; The Bristling Wood; The Dragon Revenant; A Time of Exile; A Time of Omens; Days of Blood and Fire; Days of Air and Darkness; The Red Wyvern; The Black Raven; The Fire Dragon; The Gold Falcon; The Spirit Stone; The Shadow Isle; The Silver Mage; Sword of Fire
- Author: Katharine Kerr
- Country: United States
- Language: English
- Genre: Fantasy
- Publisher: Bantam Books (USA); Voyager Books (UK, Australia)
- Published: 1986–present
- Media type: Print (Hardcover, Paperback); Audiobook; E-book

The Deverry Cycle is a series of Celtic fantasy novels by Katharine Kerr set in the fictional land of Deverry. As of February 2020, sixteen books have been published in the series.

The series is written in a non-linear style: the principal narrative is frequently interrupted by flashbacks to events that occurred decades, or even centuries, before. These flashbacks concern the prior incarnations of characters in the principal narrative, and provide insight into the relationships of the characters in their current incarnations.

== Novels ==
Kerr began working on what would become the Deverry cycle in 1982, expecting to produce a short story. The project grew much larger than that, eventually expanding into a series of sixteen novels. Kerr has a contract for two additional full novels in the series. Kerr has likened the Deverry cycle to a play, dividing the story into five acts:

- Act one: Deverry
1. Daggerspell (1986) — "Author's definitive edition" issued in 1993
2. Darkspell (1987) — "Author's definitive edition" issued in 1994
3. The Bristling Wood (1989) — US title; issued in the UK as Dawnspell: The Bristling Wood
4. The Dragon Revenant (1990) — US title; issued in the UK as Dragonspell: The Southern Sea
- Act two: The Westlands
1. A Time of Exile (1991)
2. A Time of Omens (1992)
3. Days of Blood and Fire (1993) — US title; issued in the UK as A Time of War
4. Days of Air and Darkness (1994) — US title; issued in the UK as A Time of Justice
- Act three: The Dragon Mage
1. The Red Wyvern (1997)
2. The Black Raven (1998)
3. The Fire Dragon (2000)
- Act four: The Silver Wyrm
1. The Gold Falcon (2006)
2. The Spirit Stone (2007)
3. The Shadow Isle (2008)
4. The Silver Mage (2009)
- Act five: The Justice War
1. Sword of Fire (2020), the first book in a new trilogy (The Justice War) set in Deverry, was released in February 2020.
2. A Dagger in Air (in progress)
3. The Iron Mace

== Cultures and peoples ==
The novels take place in the world of Annwn (pronounced "An-noon" [ˈanuːn], meaning "no place", the Otherworld in Welsh mythology), an Earth-like planet in a parallel universe. Annwn has six sapient species: humans, elves, dwarves, Horsekin, Dwrgi, and dragons.

=== Humans ===
There are three human nations on Annwn. They are the kingdom of Deverry, the Rhiddaer, and Bardek. Both Deverry and Bardek were colonized by humans from the "real" world, who arrived there by magical means. Only the people of the Rhiddaer represent the indigenous humans of Annwn.

The kingdom of Deverry was founded by a fictional Gallic tribe that fled Gaul to escape Roman rule. The tribe accomplished its journey across dimensions with the aid of a powerful magical being. The government of Deverry is feudal with the High King at the top and three lower ranks of nobility. The society is characterized by near-continuous internal warfare.

Bardek is a collection of independent city-states on an archipelago to the south of Deverry. There are oblique suggestions in the novels that Bardek, like Deverry, was settled by people from the "real" world, and the author has stated in online discussions that the people of Bardek are descended from Hellenized Moors. The Bardekian city-states have a democratic system of government, resembling that of Classical Athens.

The Rhiddaer (pronounced "hrithair", [r̥ɪðɛːr]), or Freeland, is located on the same continent as Deverry, to the north and west of that country. It is inhabited by the indigenous humans of Annwn, whose ancestors escaped from enslavement by the early Deverrians. The people of the Rhiddaer no longer have their own language, but speak an archaic dialect of the Deverrian language. They have a democratic system of government, headed by an elected Chief Speaker.

=== Westfolk ===
Also known as elves, the Westfolk physically resemble humans in most respects, although they can be distinguished by their pointed and furled ears, as well as their eyes which have catlike irises. The Westfolk are longer-lived than humans, with a lifespan measured in centuries, but have fewer children than humans do. The Westfolk also have sharper vision than humans, being able to see clearly in very low light. Another major difference is that the Westfolk remain youthfully vigorous for most of their adult lives, and begin to age only near the end of their lives. The Westfolk are cross-fertile with humans, and the children of such unions generally resemble humans more than elves, although they may exhibit some elvish traits (slightly sharp ears, an extended lifespan, and a long period of youthful vigor).

The Westfolk are nomads, wandering the grasslands to the west of Deverry. They formerly dwelt in seven great cities further west, but the cities were sacked by marauding Horsekin about a thousand years before the events of Daggerspell. There is a second, smaller population of Westfolk dwelling on an island south of the Bardekian archipelago, and another far to the west of Annwn past their destroyed cities.

=== Dwarves ===
Living in the mountains north of Deverry, the Mountain Folk, or dwarves, are short but stocky. Like the elves, they have a significantly longer lifespan than humans and are cross-fertile with them. They likewise share the elven ability to see in the dark. Like many versions of dwarves in fantasy fiction, they have a predilection for mining and metalworking. There are two different dwarven populations, both of which live in cities that are partially or primarily underground, and which make use of artificial and natural caves and tunnels. Dwarven culture emphasizes thrift and takes debt and obligations of all types very seriously. They distrust the Westfolk, considering them to be thieves. Connected with the dwarves is a remote and sparsely populated city, Haen Marn, which travels through space and possibly time.

=== Guardians ===
The Guardians are spirits who dwell in one of the higher planes. Though they were meant to incarnate like all other souls, they somehow stayed behind. Most have no sense of individuality. Some Guardians have great magical prowess, most notably Evandar who is responsible for bringing the original human settlers of Deverry from our world to Annwn. The Guardians are known as the Færie in “our” world, with their two main divisions known as the Seelie (led by Evandar) and Unseelie (led by his “brother”) Hosts.

=== Horsekin ===
A large and hairy humanoid species which possesses a strong psychic talent which manifests as animal empathy. They are responsible for the destruction of the former elven civilization having been pushed out of their own homelands by the humans when they arrived in Annwn. They are referred to by the elves as demons and also as Hordes. Because one of their cultural practices is to eat the flesh of their own dead, the Horsekin were struck with a cholera-like plague which almost completely destroyed their population. The survivors abandoned the elven cities and constructed new settlements nearby. The term “Gel da’Thae” refers to civilized Horsekin that live in these settlements, while the term “Horsekin” in its stricter sense refers to the uncivilized tribes that dwell on the high plains north of the Rhiddaer, who have a culture extremely different from those living by the elven ruins, and who are considered barbarians by the city-dwelling Gel da’Thae.

=== Dwrgi ===
Introduced in the penultimate volume after some brief foreshadowing in the previous work is another species that provides an elemental affinity to Water. Dwrgi appear to be shape-changers, able to shift from human (or near-human: their features as described hint at their alternate form, since their hair is particularly short and thick and their brows low) to otter-like form. There are at least two tribes or communities of them, loosely allied.

=== Dragons ===
Resembling the legendary creatures in European folklore and mythology, the dragons are enormous, four-legged reptiles with two batlike wings and long tails. Unlike legendary dragons, however, they neither breathe fire nor hoard wealth.

Dragons appear to have all originated "our" world but been convinced to move to Annwn by Evandar. Dragons dwell in the mountains north even of the Rhiddaer. Dragons appear to live alone or in mated pairs.

== Magic ==
Magic and sorcery are featured prominently in the Deverry novels. The fictional magical tradition practiced in the books, called "dweomer," is described as a personal journey toward spiritual enlightenment. The effects of magic on the material world, while spectacular, are secondary. Within the books, there are two differing schools of thought about how magic should be used. Those that follow the "dweomer of light" are servants of spiritual beings called Great Ones (analogous to the Buddhist concept of Bodhisattvas), and work to better the world in some way. Practitioners of "dark dweomer" seek magical power for its own sake or as a tool for achieving personal goals.

Characters who practice dweomer can perform a large number of magical feats. One of the most frequently used powers is to manipulate the classical elements of earth, air, fire, water, and aether by calling upon elemental spirits. Other powers include astral projection, scrying, precognition, retrocognition, and shapeshifting.

== Synopsis ==
=== The Deverry Saga ===
The first four books have two major plot threads: the quest of the extremely long lived sorcerer Nevyn to fulfill an ancient oath, and a complex plot by a cabal of sorcerers from Bardek to plunge Deverry into war. The past-life flashbacks deal with several of Nevyn's failed attempts to fulfill his oath and with the beginnings of the Time of Troubles, a decades-long period of civil war.

- Daggerspell — A rebellion in the province of Eldidd instigated by the mad half-elven sorcerer Loddlaen, himself influenced by a dark dweomerman. The immortal wizard Nevyn searches for Jill in order to fulfil an ancient oath. Jill becomes the mistress of Lord Rhodry Maelwaedd.
- Darkspell — Rhodry is sent into exile by his brother Rhys, the Gwerbret of Aberwyn, and becomes a mercenary soldier called a “silver dagger.” Jill goes with him; they become involved in a dark dweomerman's plot to steal the Great Stone of the West, a magical gemstone which guides the conscience of Deverry's king.
- The Bristling Wood (UK: Dawnspell) — Jill is kidnapped by a very peculiar lord, and Rhodry searches for her, but is captured by pirates and sold as slave in the island country of Bardek. When Gwerbret Rhys is mortally wounded, the king overrides Rhodry's sentence of exile.
- The Dragon Revenant (UK: Dragonspell) — With Rhodry now a mindwiped slave in Bardek, Jill, along with Rhodry's half-brother Ebañy a.k.a. “Salamander,” travel to Bardek to rescue him, where they are later joined by Nevyn. Salamander begins teaching Jill dweomer, and she becomes Nevyn's apprentice when she returns to Deverry. Rhodry becomes the Gwerbret of Aberwyn, partially fulfilling a prophetic omen.

=== The Westlands Saga ===
The fifth through eighth books are concerned with Rhodry's self-imposed exile and subsequent quest to find a dragon, and a Horsekin invasion of Deverry.

- A Time of Exile — Rhodry fakes his own death, and leaves Deverry behind to live among his Westfolk kin. Meanwhile, Jill, now a powerful dweomermaster, tries to decipher the riddle of Rhodry's rose ring. A past-life sequence shows how Nevyn's first apprentice, Aderyn, came to live among the Westfolk as one of their Wise Ones (dweomermasters), and how his lifespan was extended.
- A Time of Omens — Jill travels to islands south of Bardek to learn of a lost tribe of Elcyon Lacar living there. Rhodry returns to Deverry as a mercenary, takes an apprentice of sorts, and helps a noble-born girl find her Elven lover who is the last descendant of Elven royalty.
- Days of Blood and Fire (UK: A Time of War) — Jahdo, a young boy from the Rhiddaer, aids a Gel da’Thae bard in searching for his brother. Jill sends Rhodry deep into the northern mountains to find the dragon whose name is inscribed on his rose ring. Along the way he encounters Haen Marn, with lasting consequences.
- Days of Air and Darkness, (UK: A Time of Justice) — a Horsekin army besieges the city of Cengarn, driven by a mad Guardian posing as a goddess. The dragon, Arzosah, proves vital to turning the tide of battle, albeit by unexpected means.

=== The Dragon Mage Saga ===
The ninth through eleventh books feature the Time of Troubles in the past and the Rhiddaer in the present, with consequences for an entire race.

- The Red Wyvern — the only book in the cycle that is predominantly a single past-life sequence, chronicles the end of the Time of Troubles with the rise of Prince Maryn, the true king.
- The Black Raven — A noblewoman of the false king's clan with dweomer talent has cursed Prince Maryn. Her daughter rebels and becomes Nevyn's apprentice. In the present, the daughter has been reincarnated as Jahdo's older sister, while the noblewoman herself is reincarnated as the dweomer-talented priestess of the false goddess.
- The Fire Dragon — In the past-life sequence, the tale of Maryn is concluded. In the present, Jahdo is returned to his home in the Rhiddaer, with dramatic consequences for several major characters.

=== The Silver Wyrm Saga ===
The twelfth through fifteenth books complete the Deverry cycle, featuring the transformed Rhodry (now known as Rori).

- The Gold Falcon — More than forty years after The Fire Dragon, Nevyn and Jill are reincarnated as young lovers. The Horsekin, motivated by a cult based on the now-deceased mad Guardian pseudo-goddess Alshandra, have built a fortress in preparation for conquering the Westlands and Deverry.
- The Spirit Stone — A mysterious black stone plays a major role in events involving (among other things) a group of outcast Horsekin and half-breeds who are persecuted by Alshandra worshipers because of their dweomer talents. A past-life sequence connects with just prior to the present-time events of Daggerspell, completing the “Celtic knot” structure of the cycle, and features the early childhood of Salamander.
- The Shadow Isle — The return of Haen Marn catalyzes major events, including the presence of a young man from Earth. Introduces the Dwrgi.
- The Silver Mage — The conclusion of the Deverry saga.

== In pop culture ==
The song "Jillian", included in Within Temptation's album The Silent Force, is about the relationship between Nevyn and Jill.
