= Reese (surname) =

Reese is an anglicised spelling of the Welsh name Rhys, which means 'ardent' or 'fiery'. It also means wreath or garland.

== Notable people with the surname "Reese" include ==
=== A ===
- Ace Reese (born 2005), American baseball player
- Albert Reese (born 2002), Canadian football player
- Alex Reese (born 1999), American basketball player
- Allan Reese (born 1967), Dutch footballer
- Andrea Star Reese (born 1952), American photographer
- Andy Reese (1904–1966), American baseball player
- Angel Reese (born 2002), American basketball player
- Archie Reese (born 1956), American football player
- Arvell Reese (born 2005), American football player
- Aubrey Reese (born 1978), American basketball player

=== B ===
- Barry Reese (born 1972), American writer
- Becky Duval Reese, American art curator
- Benjamin Reese (1885–1943), American baseball player
- Bert Reese (1851–1926), Polish-American medium
- Booker Reese (born 1959), American football player
- Branson Reese, American comics artist and writer
- Brian Reese (born 1971), American basketball player
- Bristo W. Reese, American politician
- Brittney Reese (born 1986), American long jumper

=== C ===
- Cara Reese (1856-1914), American journalist
- Carl Reese (disambiguation), multiple people
- Cate Reese (born 1999), American basketball player
- Cathy Reese, American lacrosse coach
- Charles Reese (disambiguation), multiple people
- Charley Reese (1937–2013), American columnist
- Chip Reese (1951–2007), American poker player
- Clyde L. Reese (1958–2022), American judge
- C. Shane Reese (born 1971), American statistician
- Curtis W. Reese (1887–1961), American minister

=== D ===
- Dan Reese (disambiguation), multiple people
- Dave Reese (1892–1978), American football player
- David Reese (disambiguation), multiple people
- Debbie Reese, American native scholar
- Della Reese (1931–2017), American singer and actress
- D. H. Reese, American publisher
- Don Reese (1951–2003), American football player
- Don Reese (golfer) (born 1953), American golfer
- Dylan Reese (born 1984), American ice hockey player

=== E ===
- Eddie Reese (born 1941), American swimming coach
- Elaine Reese, New Zealand academic
- Ellen P. Reese (1926–1997), American professor
- Enoch Reese (1813–1876), American religious figure
- Evelyne Reese, Canadian politician
- Everette Dixie Reese (1923–1955), American photojournalist

=== F ===
- Fabian Reese (born 1997), German footballer
- Florence Reese (1900–1986), American activist
- Floyd Reese (1946–2021), American football executive
- Frederick Reese (disambiguation), multiple people

=== G ===
- George Reese (born 1977), American basketball player
- Gil Reese (1901–1993), American football player
- Glenn G. Reese (born 1942), American politician
- Gustave Reese (1899–1977), American musicologist
- Guy Reese (1939–2010), American football player

=== H ===
- Hans Reese (1891–1973), German footballer
- H. B. Reese (1879–1956), American businessman
- Henry Reese (1909–1975), American football player
- Hunter Reese (born 1993), American tennis player

=== I ===
- Ike Reese (born 1973), American radio announcer
- Izell Reese (born 1974), American football player

=== J ===
- Jack Reese (1877–1971), New Zealand cricketer
- James Reese (disambiguation), multiple people
- Jason Reese (1967–2019), British engineer
- Jeff Reese (born 1966), American ice hockey player
- Jerry Reese (disambiguation), multiple people
- Jesse Reese, American trade unionist
- Jim Reese (disambiguation), multiple people
- Jimmie Reese (1901–1994), American baseball player
- Jimmy Reese, American baseball player
- John Reese (disambiguation), multiple people
- Josh Reese (born 1991), American football player
- Joshua Elijah Reese (born 1984), American actor
- J. P. Reese (born 1980), American mixed martial artist

=== K ===
- Kevin Reese (born 1978), American baseball player

=== L ===
- Lil Reese (born 1983), American rapper
- Lizette Woodworth Reese (1856–1935), American poet and educator
- Llew Reese (1919–1982), Australian politician
- Lloyd Reese (1920–1981), American football player

=== M ===
- Maggie Reese, American professional shooter
- Malinda Kathleen Reese (born 1994), American internet personality
- Mamie B. Reese (1911–1997), American professor
- Marcus Reese (born 1981), American football player
- Maria Reese (1889–1958), German teacher
- Mary Bynon Reese (1832–1908), American temperance leader; writer
- Mason Reese, American actor
- Melissa Reese (born 1990), American musician
- Merrill Reese (born 1942), American radio announcer
- Mike Reese (disambiguation), multiple people
- Mona Lyn Reese (born 1951), American composer

=== O ===
- Otis Reese IV (born 1998), American football player

=== P ===
- Patty Ann Reese (born 1950), American tennis player
- Paul Reese (1917–2004), American colonel
- Pee Wee Reese (1918–1999), American baseball player
- Piper Reese (born 2000), American actress and internet personality
- Pokey Reese (born 1973), American baseball player

=== R ===
- Rachel Reese (born 1964/1965), New Zealand politician
- Ralph Reese (born 1949), American artist
- Randy Reese (born 1946), American swimming coach
- Red Reese (1899–1974), American athletic coach
- Renford Reese (born 1967), American professor
- Rhett Reese, American film producer
- Rich Reese (born 1941), American baseball player
- Rick Reese (1942–2022), American activist
- Rico Reese (born 1983), American football player
- Rita Mae Reese, American poet
- Ruth Reese (1921–1990), Norwegian-American singer

=== S ===
- Sam Reese (1930–1985), American actor
- Seaborn Reese (1846–1907), American politician
- Shayne Reese (born 1982), Australian swimmer
- Skeet Reese, American fisherman
- Sleeky Reese, American baseball player
- Søren Reese (born 1993), Danish footballer
- Steve Reese (born 1980), American soccer player
- Steve Reese (American football) (born 1952), American football player
- Stuart Reese (born 1954), New Zealand golfer

=== T ===
- Terence Reese (1913–1996), British bridge player
- Terry Reese (born 1967), American track athlete
- Tevin Reese (born 1991), American football player
- Theodore I. Reese (1873–1931), American bishop
- Thomas J. Reese (born 1945), American priest
- Tim Reese (born 1963/1964), American politician
- Tom Reese (cricket historian) (1867–1949), New Zealand cricket historian
- Tom Reese (actor) (1928–2017), American actor
- Tracy Reese (born 1964), American fashion designer
- Tribble Reese (born 1985), American television personality

=== W ===
- Ward W. Reese (1870–1927), American football coach
- William Reese (disambiguation), multiple people

== Fictional characters ==
- John Reese, a character in the tv serie Person of interest
- Kyle Reese, a character in the movie franchise Terminator

== See also ==
- Reese (given name), a page for people with the given name "Reese"
- Justice Reese (disambiguation), a disambiguation page for Justices surnamed "Reese"
