= World Publications =

- Status: Defunct(?)
- Founded: 196?
- Founder: Bob Anderson
- Country of origin: United States
- Headquarters location: 1400 Stierlin Road, Mountain View, California
- Publication types: Books and magazine
- Nonfiction topics: Health, fitness, wellness, running, cycling

World Publications (Anderson World Books, Inc., Anderson World Publications, Anderson World, or Bob Anderson Publications) was a book and magazine publisher in the late 1960s-1980s started by Bob Anderson.

== Publications ==
Author	Publication	Publisher	Date	ISBN/ISSN	Notes
	Runner's World magazine		1969	ISSN 0035-9939, OCLC 438692271	Previously Distance Running News (1966–1969). Acquired by Rodale, Inc. in Emmaus, Pennsylvania in 1984, ISSN 0897-1706
Runner's World editors	New Views of Speed Training	Anderson World, Incorporated	1971	ISBN 978-0-89037-007-0
Runner's World editors	Racing Techniques	Anderson World, Incorporated	1971	ISBN 978-0-89037-016-2
Anderson, Bob and Henderson, Joe	Guide to Distance Running	World Publications	1972	no ISBN
Sheehan, George	The Encyclopedia of Athletic Medicine	World Publications	1972	no ISBN	Originally in Runner's World issue 12
Anderson, Bob	The Complete Runner	World Publications	1974	ISBN 978-0-89037-041-4
Henderson, Joe	Run Gentle, Run Long	World Publications	1974	no ISBN
	Bike World magazine			ISSN 0098-8650	Acquired by Rodale in 1977 and later renamed to Bicycling
Bike World	Traveling by Bike	World Publications	1974	OCLC 2054832
Anderson, Bob	Sportsource	World Publications	1975	ISBN 978-0-89037-061-2
Dolson, Frank	Always Young	World Publications	1975	ISBN 978-0-89037-073-5
Bike World	International Bicycle Touring	World Publications	1976	ISBN 978-0-89037-108-4
Bike World	Complete Bicycle Time Trialing Book	World Publications	1977	ISBN 978-0-89037-123-7
Daws, Ron	Self-Made Olympian	Anderson World	1977	ISBN 978-0-89037-103-9
Hlavac, Harry	The Foot Book: Advice for Athletes		1977	ISBN 0-89037-119-9
Benyo, Richard	Return to Running	World Publications	1978	ISBN 0-89037-128-8
	FIT magazine		1979	ISSN 0278-9760	Name changed in 1985 to Get Fit, ISSN 8750-8079
Bike World	Bicycle Track Racing	World Publications	1980	ISBN 978-0-89037-109-1
FIT	Get fit	Anderson World Books	1982	LCCN 82-13721
Benyo, Richard and Rhonda Provost	Runner's World Advanced Indoor Exercise Book	Anderson World	1982	ISBN 0-89037-167-9
Anderson, Bob	The Complete Runner	Anderson World	1982	ISBN 978-0-02-499040-2
Levin, Susan and FIT	Arms and shoulders	Anderson World Books	1983	LCCN 83-21377
FIT	Women's bodybuilding photo book	Anderson World Books	1983	LCCN 83-21391
Mayo, DeBarra	Runner's World Yoga Book II	Anderson World Books, Inc.	1983	ISBN 0-89037-274-8
Mayo, DeBarra with Joseph Mayo	Women's Bodybuilding for Beginners	Anderson World Books, Inc.	1983	ISBN 0-89037-290-X
Cassidy, Catherine and the editors of FIT	Figure Maintenance	Anderson World Books	1983	ISBN 0-89037-255-1
Clive, Teagan	Body Sculpturing (Getting Strong)	Anderson World Books	1984	ISBN 0-89037-304-3
Higdon, Hal	Beginners Running Guide	Anderson World	1987	ISBN 0-89037-130-X
