= Running boom of the 1970s =

1970s fad

The running boom of the 1970s occurred in high- and middle-income countries. It was particularly pronounced in the United States and occurred in other countries, including the United Kingdom, other European countries, Australia, and New Zealand.

The boom was primarily a jogging movement in which running was generally limited to personal physical activity and often pursued alone for recreation and fitness. Later in the decade, it was associated with a growth in public participation in competitive road running during the decade, particularly in the United States, which spread to other countries in the following decade, including the United Kingdom. It is estimated that 25 million Americans took up some aspect of running in the 1970s and 1980s, including President Jimmy Carter. With more running events, shoe and apparel manufacturers grew and formed to accommodate the demand.

The boom attracted women and individuals in minority communities, but studies from the time showed that participants in running races were most commonly university-educated men in white-collar occupations.

== Background ==
Growth in jogging began in the late 1960s, building on a post–World War II trend towards non-organized, individualistic, health-oriented physical and recreational activities.

In New Zealand, Arthur Lydiard presided over the country's golden era in world track and field during the 1960s. Lydiard published Run to the Top in 1962 and in the same year introduced Bill Bowerman to the concept of running as a fitness routine, including for people of an advanced age. Bowerman took running back to the United States; he began a public jogging program at Hayward Field in 1963 and published Jogging in 1966, which helped to popularize the concept in the U.S. Jim Ryun grew from a top high school runner into an American sports hero and had a popular rivalry with Marty Liquori. American athletes such as Steve Prefontaine raised the profile of the sport.

== 1972 Olympic marathon ==
Frank Shorter's victory in the men's marathon at the 1972 Summer Olympics is credited with inspiring the running boom in the United States. He was the third American to win the Olympic marathon, but the first since 1908. The victory was covered by ABC, including dramatic coverage of the finish, when a German imposter ran into the stadium ahead of Shorter. Serving as guest color commentator was writer Erich Segal, who called out over the airwaves (but inaudibly to Shorter) "It's a fraud, Frank." In 2000, The Washington Post included the phrase among the ten most memorable American sports calls.

The television story changed the way Americans viewed the sport of long-distance running. According to Joe Muldowney, at the time "most Americans had no idea what the marathon was, let alone its weird 26.2-mile distance. Some folks may have heard of the Boston Marathon, an event that had been held since 1897, but few Americans had the desire to tackle the race itself."

== Growth in participation ==
The boom was primarily a 'jogging' movement in which running was generally limited to personal physical activity and often pursued alone for recreation and fitness.

Elite athletes and events contributed to the growing popularity and recognition of the sport. Finnish athlete Lasse Virén recaptured the image of the "Flying Finns". American runners such as Bill Rodgers and Craig Virgin inspired the public. New elite teams formed, notably Athletics West in the United States. The British trio Sebastian Coe, Steve Cram, and Steve Ovett dominated middle-distance running in the late 1970s and 1980s.

Many new road racing events evolved in the United States offering public participation. As technology improved, television coverage of major races eventually included:

- Bay to Breakers
- Boston Marathon
- Chicago Marathon
- Los Angeles Marathon
- New York Marathon

Women were just beginning to become accepted as athletes. In the United States, Title IX, mandating gender equality, was passed in the United States in 1972, opening up scholastic athletic opportunities for women. Many academic institutions used running sports like cross country and track and field for women to help numerically offset the number of players on their economically lucrative football teams. Road running and marathoning became a sport at which they could excel. Female pioneers in the United States—including Kathrine Switzer, Jacqueline Hansen and Miki Gorman—led other women to believe they could run seriously. Mary Decker, Francie Larrieu and Norway's Grete Waitz were all part of a phenomenon that culminated in Joan Benoit's 1984 Olympic Marathon victory, which itself inspired more women to run.

It is estimated that 25 million Americans took up some aspect of running in the 1970s and 1980s, including President Jimmy Carter. Many running events, shoe and apparel manufacturers grew and formed to accommodate the demand. While the boom attracted women and individuals in minority communities, studies from the time showed that participants in running races were most commonly university-educated men in white-collar occupations.

The growth in road racing events spread to other countries including the United Kingdom, Australia, New Zealand and to Europe in the following decade. In 1978, there were over a million runners in Britain. Participation in running in the UK grew rapidly after Olympians Chris Brasher and John Disley founded the London Marathon and Brendan Foster started the Great North Run both in 1981. Several British runners who began running in the 1970s achieved "Big City" marathon wins in the 1980s, including Steve Jones (Chicago, New York and London), Charlie Spedding (London), Mike Gratton (London), Paul Davies-Hale (Chicago), Geoff Smith (Boston), Hugh Jones (London), Priscilla Welch (New York), Veronique Marot (London) and Joyce Smith (London).

== Media in the United States ==
Many factors combined to build momentum for the boom in the United States. Media coverage was responsive and supportive of the boom.

Notable publications included:

- Runner's World magazine, launched in 1966 and became a monthly in 1973. Competitors included Running, The Runner and Running Times, which eventually merged in various forms.
- Jim Fixx published The Complete Book of Running in 1977, which became a best seller.
- George Sheehan wrote Running and Being in 1978, a philosophical approach which also became a best seller.

Other running authors and writers:

- Bob Anderson
- John Bingham
- Amby Burfoot
- Kenneth H. Cooper
- Bob Glover
- Joe Henderson
- Hal Higdon
- Don Kardong
- Kenny Moore
- Browning Ross

== Legacy ==
In the late 1990s and early 2000s, a second running boom occurred in Europe and North America marked by a more notable increase in participation in organized races. The number of finishers of road races of all distances in the United States increased by 300% between 1990 and 2013; followed by a decline in 2014–15.

Studies have shown a continuous trend of 'democratization' among participants of running events since 1969 with broader socio-demographic representation among participants, including more female finishers, although some evidence is mixed and participation still varies by country and event.

== See also ==
- Exercise trends
- Fitness boot camp § History
- Fitness culture
- Outdoor fitness
