= Jeff Galloway =

American distance runner (1945–2026)

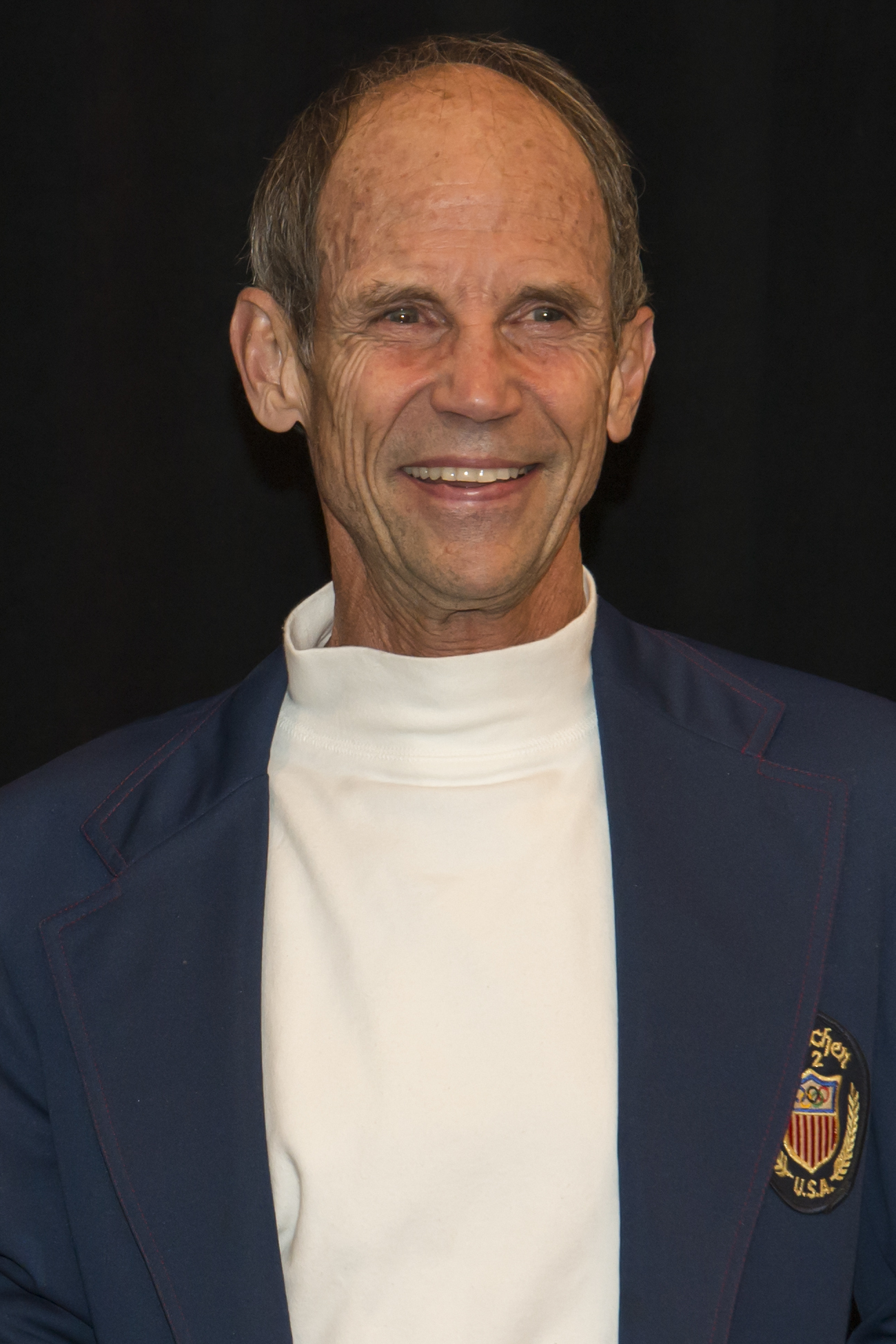
- Galloway in 2015
- Born: John Franks Galloway; July 12, 1945; Raleigh, North Carolina, U.S.
- Died: February 25, 2026 (aged 80); Pensacola, Florida, U.S.
- Education: Florida State University; Wesleyan University
- Occupations: Olympian and CEO of Galloway Productions

John Franks "Jeff" Galloway (July 12, 1945 – February 25, 2026) was an American Olympian and the author of Galloway's Book on Running.

A lifetime runner, Galloway was an All-American collegiate athlete and a 1972 US Olympic Team member in the 10,000 meters. He remained a competitive athlete, continuing through a successful masters running career. He was the chief executive officer of Galloway Productions, which conducts a broad range of training programs and events yearly; he also owned two running specialty stores. He penned several books on training and wrote a monthly column for Runner's World magazine.

== Early life and collegiate career ==
John Franks Galloway was born in Raleigh, North Carolina, on July 12, 1945, to Elliott and Kitty (née Warren) Galloway. They settled in Atlanta, Georgia, where his parents founded The Galloway School. His parents both became runners. In high school, at The Westminster Schools in Atlanta, Galloway recorded bests of 4:28 in the mile and 9:48 in the two-mile; he became the state champion in the latter event.

Running for Wesleyan University, he developed as a competitor, earning All-American honors in cross-country and track, clocking 4:12 in the mile, and noted times of 9:06 in the two-mile and 14:10 for three. He was on the 1966 Wesleyan cross country team along with Amby Burfoot. Bill Rodgers joined the team as a freshman during this time.

In 1970, Galloway became the first winner of the Peachtree Road Race in Atlanta, Georgia.

After three years in the United States Navy, Galloway attended graduate school at Florida State University (FSU), where he earned a master's degree in social studies and met his wife, Barbara, who competed for the FSU women's track team. While at FSU, he became a member of the Florida Track Club team, based at the University of Florida in Gainesville and led by Jack Bacheler and Frank Shorter.

== Olympian ==
Galloway and his Florida Track Club teammates, Shorter and Bacheler, made the 1972 U.S. Olympic team, Galloway in the 10K, Bacheler in the marathon, and Shorter in both events. The three spent two months in the mountains near Vail, Colorado, conditioning themselves for the Olympics. According to noted runner and journalist, Joe Henderson, Galloway "should have been an Olympic marathoner", but is sometimes said to have given up his shot at a spot in the longer event to help his friend, Bacheler, to make the 1972 team. On his official website, Galloway says, "my greatest thrill was pacing Jack through the marathon trial and then dropping back at the finish so that he could take the remaining spot on the marathon team." Bacheler had narrowly missed out qualifying in the 10,000m trials a week earlier. Galloway was an alternate for the marathon.

== Other running accolades ==
In 1973, Galloway set an American ten-mile road race record, posting a time of 47:49. He was a U.S. National Track and Field team member in Europe, Russia, and Africa. In the mid-1970s, he altered his training program to emphasize more rest and less weekly mileage, coupled with a long run every other week — a model that has worked successfully for amateurs and first-time marathon runners since then. The strategy helped extend his competitive career, and at age 35, he ran the Houston-Tenneco Marathon in 2:16:35. Other marks included 27:21 for six miles and 28:29 for the ten-kilometer event.

== Peachtree Road Race and race directing ==
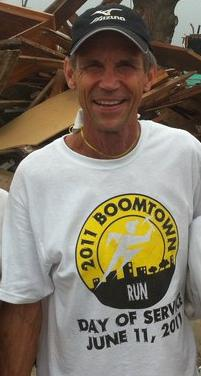
Jeff Galloway in 2011

For many years, Galloway was a key organizer of the Peachtree Road Race, one of the premier 10 kilometer road race events in the United States. Galloway helped the race achieve status as a marquee event by bringing together world-class fields which, in 1977, included Frank Shorter, Bill Rodgers, Don Kardong, and Lasse Virén. This brought international recognition to the race, while entries escalated from 1,200 to 12,000 participants by 1980.

In 1978, Galloway co-founded the Avon International Women's Marathon, helping to bring the advent of the women's Olympic marathon. He was also co-director of the Manufacturers Hanover Corporate Challenge.

== Other work ==
In 1973, Galloway founded Phidippides, which developed into a nationwide franchise network of 35 running stores. The chain dwindled, and as of 2006, Galloway owned only two Phidippides stores in the Atlanta area. There are currently zero Phidippides running stores operating under its original management in Atlanta, as the brand permanently closed its final two locations on December 31, 2024.

In 1975, Galloway ventured into the vacation fitness camp business, and as of 2006, there are three in operation each summer in Colorado, British Columbia, and Olympic Valley, California. Coaches and lecturers have included Runner's World founder, Bob Anderson, Covert Bailey, Joe Henderson, Harry Hlavac, DPM, MEd, Joan Ullyot, MD and the late New Zealand Olympic track coach, Arthur Lydiard. In addition to vacation fitness camps, Galloway Productions conducts fitness seminars and marathon training groups across the United States. Runners and coaches around the globe have used his unique training approach.

Galloway developed the idea of the "Magic Mile", a way to calculate a marathon or half-marathon time using a person's 1-mile time. His endurance training regime, involving alternating periods of running and walking, is known variously as Jeffing, Gallowalking and the Galloway method.

== Advice on running and life ==
Galloway advised using positive self-talk for running and for life's challenges. He focused on the words 'relax', 'power', and 'glide' at strategic points during races.

== Personal life and death ==
On February 25, 2026, Galloway died from complications related to a stroke and brain bleeding in Pensacola, Florida. He was 80.

== Achievements ==
- All results regarding marathon, unless stated otherwise

Year	Competition	Venue	Position	Notes
Representing the United States
1974	Honolulu Marathon	Honolulu, Hawaii	1st	2:23:02

== Books ==
- Galloway, Jeff, Galloway's Book on Running, (1984), ISBN 978-0-394-72709-7
- Galloway, Jeff, Return of the Tribes to Peachtree Street, (1995), Galloway Productions, ISBN 978-0-9647187-0-8
- Galloway, Jeff (and Joe Henderson) Better Runs (1995) Human Kinetics Publishers; 1 edition, ISBN 978-0-87322-866-4
- Galloway, Jeff, Marathon!, (1996), Phidippides Production, ISBN 0-9647187-1-5
- Galloway, Jeff, Marathon: You Can Do It! , (2001), Shelter Publications, ISBN 978-0-936070-25-4
- Galloway, Jeff, Galloway's Book on Running (revised), 2nd edition, Shelter Publications, ISBN 978-0-936070-27-8
- Galloway, Jeff, Running: A Year Round Plan, (2005) Meyer & Meyer Fachverlag und Buchhandel GmbH, ISBN 978-1-84126-169-0
- Galloway, Jeff, Running: Getting Started, Meyer & Meyer Fachverlag und Buchhandel GmbH, (2005) ISBN 978-1-84126-166-9
- Galloway, Jeff, Running: Testing Yourself, Meyer & Meyer Fachverlag und Buchhandel GmbH, (2005) ISBN 978-1-84126-167-6
- Galloway, Jeff, Walking: the Complete Book, Meyer & Meyer Fachverlag und Buchhandel GmbH, (2005) ISBN 978-1-84126-170-6
- Galloway, Jeff, Mental Training For Runners - No More Excuses!, Maidenhead: Meyer & Meyer Sport (UK) Ltd., (2016) ISBN 978-1-78255-083-9

== See also ==
- Running

== Audio interview ==
- "Interview with legendary coach Jeff Galloway"
- "Interview with Jeff Galloway, recounted on how he had arranged to help pace his friend and training partner Bacheler"
