= Charles Reese =

Charles Reese may refer to:

- Charles Reese (politician), member of the Mississippi House of Representatives
- Charles Chandler Reese (1862-1936), American artist, illustrator, and newspaper cartoonist
- Charles Lee Reese, American chemist

== See also ==
- Charley Reese, American syndicated columnist
