= John Rees =

John Rees may refer to:

- John Rees (activist) (born 1957), British political activist and writer
- John Rees (cricketer) (1880–1959), Australian cricketer
- John Rees (journalist) (c. 1926), right-wing publisher and informant
- John Rees (musician) (1857–1949), Welsh musician
- John Rees (bassist) (born 1951), Australian bassist, known for being part of the classic line-up of rock band Men at Work
- Conway Rees (1870–1932), John Conway Rees, Welsh rugby union international
- Sir John Rees, 1st Baronet (1854–1922), colonial administrator in British India and member of parliament
- Sir John Milsom Rees (1866–1952), Welsh surgeon
- John Rawlings Rees (1890–1969), British psychiatrist

== See also ==
- Jonny Rees, Hong Kong rugby union player
- Jonny Rees (model), Mr. Wales 2008
- John Reese (disambiguation)
- John Rhys (1840–1915), scholar
- John Rhys-Davies (born 1944), Welsh actor
