= Tapering (sports) =

Period of rest before a sports competition

In sports, tapering is the practice of reducing exercise in the days just before an important competition. Tapering is customary both in endurance sports, such as long-distance running and swimming, and strength sports, such as weightlifting and sprinting. For many athletes, a significant period of tapering is essential for optimal performance. The tapering period frequently lasts as much as a week or more. This tapering means gradually reducing the exercise over a short period of time then stopping completely when leading up to competitions.

== Tapering periods ==
As a general rule of thumb, longer endurance events are generally preceded by longer tapering periods, with the curious exception of particularly long endurance competitions, such as ultramarathons and multiday races. In swimming the opposite is true; distance swimmers will often taper for only a week or less, while strength athletes taper for up to 3 weeks.

Typically, tapering for relatively short endurance events takes as little as a week or less, but tapering for an event like the marathon takes at least two or three weeks. Bob Cooper, a veteran marathoner and contributing editor for Runner's World, points to medical studies as evidence that the final three weeks of any marathon-training program are the most critical stage of training; a review of fifty studies on tapering indicates that optimal levels of muscle glycogen, enzymes, antioxidants, and hormones, which are significantly depleted by intense endurance training, are achieved during a taper. Tapering may also be done for submaximal exercises.

== Before tapering ==
Often, a workout simulating the actual race distance and conditions will climax the period of training immediately before tapering. According to two-time American Olympian Pete Pfitzinger "the taper should be preceded by your last long run."
