= Bob Anderson (runner) =

American runner & photographer (born 1947)

Bob Anderson, Bikini Jam 2005

Bob Anderson (born December 28, 1947, in Manhattan, Kansas) is an American runner, photographer, publisher, film producer and businessman. He started running on February 16, 1962, and has been running since then. He currently logs on average 50 miles per week of running and walking. In 2012 he ran 50 races (350.8 miles) to celebrate 50 years of running. He averaged 6:59/mile. A movie called A Long Run covers the event. He was the founder of Runner's World magazine. A desire to find information about running and racing led him to a career in magazine and book publishing for more than twenty years.

After selling Runner's World to Rodale, Inc. in Emmaus, Pennsylvania in 1984, he founded Ujena Swimwear, and Around Town Productions. In 2012 he founded a new sport called Double Racing [a two-stage running race with a halftime recovery break between the legs]. His Double Road Race Federation was established to promote this new sport. in 2014 he started a website called My Best Runs that features and follows the best, most interesting and unique races in the world. On that site he is the editor of the popular column called Running News Daily. He says it reminds him of the days he started Distance Running News (1966) that he renamed Runner’s World in 1970.

In 2014 he and his wife Catherine traveled to Kenya to produce a Double Racing event. They returned in 2015 and produced another successful event. It was on that trip, Bob decided to set up a running related business in Thika Kenya. Today the Kenyan Athletics Training Academy (KATA) is a going concern. Athletes live and train there.

== Life and work ==
In 1966, as a high school senior in Overland Park, Kansas, Bob Anderson was interested in running. He was a 4:41-miler with a passion for the sport. He wanted to learn how to train for a marathon. He searched for information about training and racing and discovered there was little information available so, at age 17, he started his publication.

Anderson started a black and white magazine titled "Distance Running News" and began selling subscriptions. The publication came out twice per year and by its second year, the magazine had 850 subscribers. The circulation grew to 3000 and the publication developed into a magazine published six times per year. Anderson published the magazine by himself for several years.

In 1970, Anderson brought on runner and writer Joe Henderson as chief editor. Henderson was a young newspaper reporter and former Iowa State cross-country champion who had worked for Track and Field News. In that same year, Anderson moved the operations from Kansas to Mountain View, California, and the name of the magazine changed to Runners World. Runner and cardiologist George Sheehan came on board as the magazine's featured columnist and medical editor.

In 1973, the magazine went monthly and added color to the pages. As the popularity of running grew in the United States, the circulation of the magazine increased. Runner's World thrived during the "running boom". According to an article in the Oakland Tribune, the circulation of Runner's World increased from 50,000 in 1975 to 250,000 in 1977. In that same year Henderson left to pursue other writing and editing opportunities.

In 1980, the Daily Herald (Chicago) published a San Francisco (AP) article titled: "Running: Sport of the '70s." The article highlighted comments by Bob Anderson. In that article, Anderson said that in 1970 the number of people who considered themselves runners was 2 million. He also said that according to a national survey of one independent polling company, the number of people who considered themselves runners was 30 million.

Bob Anderson's contributions captured the attention of President Ronald Reagan. He was invited to the White House and acknowledged for his contributions to health and wellness in the United States. Writers and columnists for Runner's World included Richard Benyo, John Brant, Ambrose Burfoot, Bob Cooper, Joe Henderson, Hal Higdon, Don Kardong, Kenny Moore, George Sheehan, and Joan Ullyot.

== Publishing ==
Bob Anderson expanded his publishing ventures beyond Runner's World magazine. He founded Anderson World Books, Inc. and began publishing books and other magazines related to health and wellness. Author and running expert Richard Benyo acted as vice president and editor of Anderson's publications.

He produced the Runner's World Book Series, which included books related to exercise, stretching, aerobics, bodybuilding, yoga, and nutrition. He also published numerous books on running, including The Complete Woman Runner, and The Complete Runner.

Anderson published magazines including Bike World, Nordic World, Soccer World, Self-Defense World, and Aquatics World. He also published FIT magazine, a high-gloss women's fitness magazine that was widely circulated during the 1980s. Many celebrities appeared on FIT magazine covers including Donna Dixon, Jane Fonda, Lisa Hartman, Kymberly Herrin, Donna Mills, Connie Sellecca and Raquel Welch. Writers and contributing editors for FIT included Denise Austin, Catherine Cassidy, Joanie Greggains, Jenilee Harrison, and DeBarra Mayo.

As a spin-off of FIT magazine, Anderson published a book series titled The Fit Self-Improvement Series, which covered a myriad of topics including skin and hair care. He also published the Get Fit Book, which featured actress Priscilla Presley on the cover, and he published FIT Magazine presents Your Healthy Pregnancy '84: Jane Fonda's Program for Staying Fit While Pregnant, which featured a cover photo of Jane Fonda holding a baby.

Expanding his publishing pursuits, Anderson put out The Home Medical Book Series; published in cooperation with the Palo Alto Medical Foundation for Health Care, Research and Education.

== Career change ==
In 1984, Bob Anderson sold Runner's World to Robert Rodale of Rodale, Inc., who moved the editorial offices to Emmaus, Pennsylvania.

Anderson then began working with swimwear and fashion photographer Steve Harvey. After teaming up with a swimwear fashion designer, Anderson founded Ujena Swimwear and Swimwear Illustrated magazine. Anderson acts as CEO and his daughter, Lisa Anderson-Wall, has acted as president of the company for more than twelve years.

For more than 20 years, Anderson produced "The Ujena Jam Talent Search Week", an event for swimwear models and photographers, which has been expanded to include lifestyle events, fashion photography, casting, workshops and theme parties. A golf, fishing and soccer tournament has been added.

Anderson has created a sister company, Around Town Productions, which has produced four films, including the drama What about Cuba!.

Anderson remains dedicated to photography. His preference for many years was 35mm slide film because he loved the natural skin tones and color saturation the film provided, but he now shoots 100% digital. "I love to shoot in places like Cabo San Lucas. The light is perfect, the weather is awesome and the backdrops are great. All I need is a couple of days, four models and some great suits and I can shoot an entire catalog."

Anderson promotes health and wellness by sponsoring 5 km races, and he recently started a weekly fitness column titled "Bikini Body Fitness" by DeBarra Mayo.

Bob Anderson has photographed over 600 models at more than 350 locations around the world. His mate, Catherine Cross, is the public relations director for Ujena and she is the director for Around Town Productions. He still runs 40 miles per week and participates in road races up to 10 miles. He has lived in Los Altos, California, since 1969.

=== Double Road Race ===
In 2012, Anderson founded a new race series called the Double Race series Double Road Race.

== See also ==
- Running
