= Team World Vision =

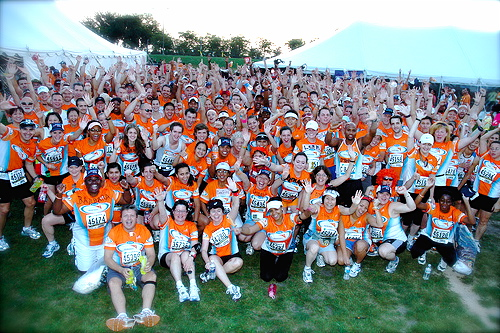
Team World Vision before the 2007 Chicago Marathon

Team World Vision is a fundraising program of humanitarian organization World Vision that equips individuals to raise money for World Vision projects. Currently, Team World Vision's has the most participants at the Bank of America Chicago Marathon, but athletes are able to participate in any athletic event in the United States in order to raise money for World Vision. Unlike most large charity runner organizations Team World Vision does not pay for team member's race entry fees, jerseys or transportation as this helps keep overhead low.

== History ==
Team World Vision began in 2005 under the direction of (current National Director) Michael Chitwood. Chitwood has stated that his life was changed physically, emotionally, and spiritually after running his first marathon, and felt called to start a team that could bring that experience to more people and help to people in poverty around the world.

Since its start in Chicago in 2005, Team World Vision has expanded to include staff in New York, Minneapolis, Miami, Dallas, Los Angeles, and Seattle. The biggest Team World Vision event has continued to be the Bank of America Chicago Marathon, however. In 2006, Team World Vision had just over 100 runners in the Chicago Marathon. In 2010, there were more than 1,200 Team World Vision runners at the Chicago Marathon who raised over 1 million dollars. The money raised provides children and communities in Africa with clean water.

== Cause ==
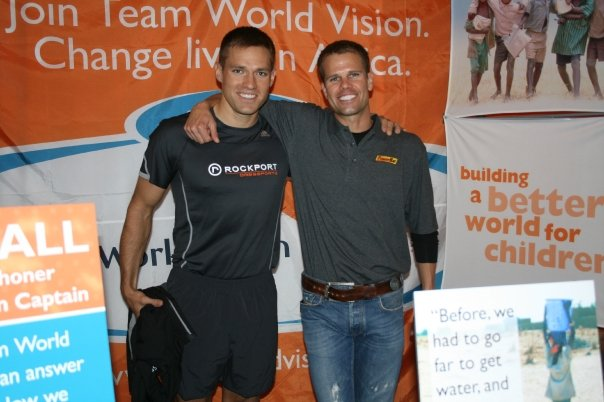
Bachelor Andy Baldwin and pro runner Josh Cox stop by to say hello at the Team World Vision expo booth. "It's for the kids!"

While all of the money raised by Team World Vision athletes goes to furthering the work of the Christian humanitarian agency World Vision, it does have a specific focus within World Vision's efforts. All of the Team World Vision events raise money to provide clean water to children and communities in Africa, with one exception: the money raised at the NYC Marathon goes to help with World Vision's child protection efforts.

== Events ==
With Team World Vision, runners can choose to run a Premier Event, a Small Group Event, or another event of their choice. Currently, the Premier Events include: the Bank of America Chicago Marathon, the Chicago Half Marathon, the Metro PCS Dallas White Rock Marathon and Half Marathon, the Honda LA Marathon, the 13.1 Los Angeles benefiting World Vision, the Medtronic Twin Cities Marathon, the 13.1 Minneapolis benefiting World Vision, the ING Miami Marathon and Half Marathon, the 13.1 Dallas benefiting World Vision, the 13.1 NY benefiting World Vision, and the 13.1 Ft. Lauderdale benefiting World Vision.

== Advocates ==
Josh Cox, the 50k American Marathon holder, four-time Olympic trials qualifier, and a Team World Vision Team Captain. He has traveled to Africa with Team World Vision to run the Comrades 56-mile race and to meet the child he sponsors through World Vision.

Andy Baldwin, former star of ABC's The Bachelor, ironman triathlete, humanitarian, physician, and Team World Vision Team Captain. He traveled to South Africa with Team World Vision in 2010 to run and meet his sponsored child.

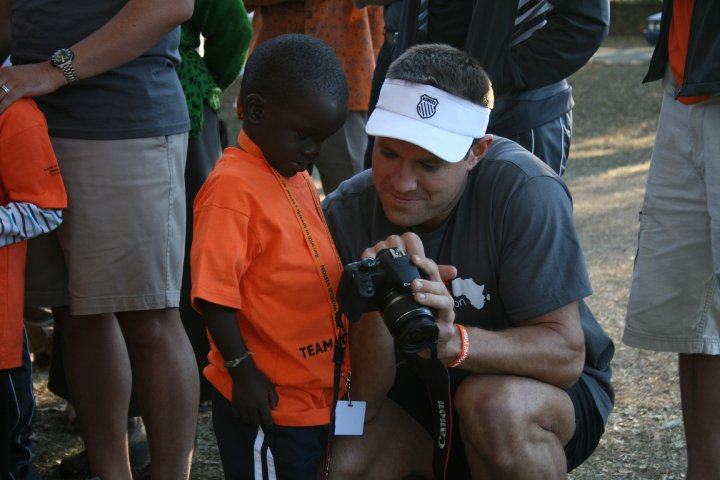
ABC's Bachelor shares photos with his sponsored child, an inspiration for 56-mile Comrades

Other professional runners who advocate for Team World Vision include Bart Yasso (Chief Running Officer of Runner's World), Chris Lieto (American triathlete) and Jose Munoz (winner, 2007 P.F. Chang's half marathon). Ryan Hall and his wife Sara also support Team World Vision's efforts through their foundation, the Hall Steps Foundation.

In a New Yorker article published on August 11, 2008, Ryan and Sara Hall talk about Team World Vision with author Peter Hessler: "We kind of see the money we have as God's money," Sara told me. They supported a Christian charity called Team World Vision, which gets entrants to the country's major marathons to raise money for development projects in Africa."
