= Herb Kirk =

Herb Kirk (October 2, 1895 – October 3, 2001 in Bozeman, Montana) was an American centenarian. Many of his accomplishments came well after his retirement.

== Biography ==
In 1993, he was the oldest graduate of Montana State University, at age 96, with a degree in Art.

He was an avid tennis player. The Herb Kirk Junior Open, held at Montana State University is named in his honor. When his eyesight failed in his 80s he took up running. Since that time, he amassed Masters Athletics World Records in the M95 800 metres and Mile run. He formerly also held the record for 5000 metres. At one point in time, Kirk held every American record between 200 metres and 5000 metres. From age 85 on, he was the first competitor in each of those age divisions of Masters athletics.

In June 1999, he ran and completed the Governor's Cup 5K road race, along with four other generations of the Kirk family, which is believed to be a unique occurrence. At age 104 and 6 months, this is believed to be the oldest athlete to compete in an organized running event and second only to thrower John Whittemore in any athletic event.

Kirk grew up in Pennsylvania and originally attended Lehigh University. That education was interrupted by World War I. He joined the Navy Flying Corps. At age 104, he was given the rank of Chevalier in the French Legion of Honour (Légion d'Honneur) for his service in the protection of France during the war.

After a successful business career he retired to his wife's home town of Bozeman, where he was active in teaching pottery to nearby Native Americans.

Upon graduating, he was asked to speak. He reportedly ran up to the stage, and concluded his remarks by looking at the reunion group of the class of 1943 (who would have been about a quarter century his junior) and told them "I am really looking forward to my 50th reunion."

When interviewed by Diane Sawyer of Good Morning America in 1999, he said about his running "It keeps me in good shape, active, interesting. I wouldn't do without some exercise. I'd be downhill fast."

Kirk's obituary in Runners World read: "Herb Kirk, 1895-2001: On October 3, one day after celebrating his 106th birthday, Herb Kirk, reportedly the oldest man to compete in an organized running event, died of pneumonia. At the Portland Marathon fun run in September 1996, Kirk finished the 2-mile course in about 36 minutes. He set several age group records in his late 80s and early 90s. Herb, a Montana resident, holds world and American records ranging from 200m to the 5,000m on the track. He holds countless single-age records. Kirk was interviewed by ABC's Diane Sawyer and others for a 1999 profile."
