= Richard Benyo =

American runner and magazine editor

- Born: April 20, 1946 (age 80); Jim Thorpe, Pennsylvania
- Occupation: Journalist

Richard Stephen Benyo (born April 20, 1946) is an American journalist and veteran distance runner. He is the editor of Marathon & Beyond Magazine, a magazine devoted to marathon and ultramarathon running. He is also the former executive editor of Runner's World Magazine, and Anderson World Books, Inc. Benyo is the author of 17 books and has written extensively about running, health and fitness.

== Early life and education ==
Benyo earned his B.A. in 1968 from Bloomsburg State College (now Bloomsburg University) in 1968. He did academic work at George Mason University in Fairfax, Virginia.

Benyo became interested in road racing after participating in college cross country.

In 1963-64, Benyo was the ed-pub (editor & publisher) of the amateur SF fanzine Galactic Outpost, which included the first publication of Philip K. Dick's story "The War With the Fnools" in issue #2, later republished in Galaxy Science Fiction magazine. His fanzine helped introduce Dick's work to a wider audience through correspondence with authors. Benyo, a teenage Pennsylvania SF fan, was the ed-pub of not only GO, but Ribbler's Ram/Rissler's Ram, Wizard & Warrior, and Dipple Chronicle.

== Career ==
Following college, he became a newspaper editor for the Lehighton Times-News from 1968–1972.

From 1972–1977, Benyo worked in an editorial position for Stock Car Racing magazine before joining Bob Anderson as executive editor at Runner's World magazine. During this time he authored and co-authored books and magazine features.

He worked as the editor of Marathon & Beyond from 1997 until it closed down in late 2015.

Benyo has authored 17 books on running, health, and fitness and has served as the running and fitness columnist for the San Francisco Chronicle (1985–1990). He has also contributed to numerous general circulation magazines.

Benyo's latest book—written with Joe Henderson is The Running Encyclopedia. He also serves on the staff of the Dick Beardsley Marathon Running Camp.

In 2006, a commemorative book was released in honor of the Boston Marathon. The book, edited by Benyo, contains several articles by widely known runner and writer, Hal Higdon.

== Long distance running ==
Benyo is a serious long-distance runner who over the past 20 years has competed in distance races-from 400 meters to ultramarathons. He has completed 37 marathons.

Benyo and his running partner Tom Crawford, founded the Badwater race, with its first one taking place in 1987. In 1989, Benyo and Tom Crawford, became the first to complete the run from Badwater in Death Valley (the lowest point in the Western Hemisphere and one of the hottest places on Earth), to the peak of Mount Whitney (at 14,494 feet highest point in the contiguous United States) and back, a total distance of 300 miles. He chronicled the event 1991.

== Personal life ==
Benyo was married to his first wife, Jill Wapnsky in April 1972, they divorced in 1979.

Richard Benyo's wife, Rhonda Provost, became the first woman and the eighth runner overall to successfully complete the Death Valley-to-Mt. Whitney double-crossing in 1995. She has co-authored publications and articles with him. They currently reside in Sonoma County, California.

== Awards and recognition ==
In 1972, Benyo was awarded the "Best Local Column Award" from the Pennsylvania Newspaper Publishers Association.

In 1998, Richard Benyo was named Journalist of the Year by the Road Runners Club of America (RRCA). In 2004, Benyo and his running partner, Tom Crawford, were inducted into the Badwater Hall of Fame.

In 2005, Running USA inducted Benyo into its Hall of Champions.

== Publications ==
- Benyo, Richard, (1978) Return to Running, World Publications, ISBN 0-89037-128-8
- Benyo, Richard and Rhonda Provost (Benyo Press Staff), (1981) Runner's World Indoor Exercise Book, Anderson World, ISBN 978-0-02-499530-8
- Benyo, Richard and Rhonda Provost, (1982) Runner's World Advanced Indoor Exercise Book, Anderson World, ISBN 0-89037-167-9
- Benyo, Richard, (1983) The Masters of the Marathon, Atheneum, ISBN 0-689-11340-4
- Benyo, Richard and Rhonda Provost, (1987) Feeling Fit in Your 40'S/How to Get the Most from the Best Years of Your Life, Atheneum, ISBN 0-689-11581-4
- Benyo, Richard, (1989) Exercise Fix, Human Kinetics Publishers, ISBN 0-88011-341-3
- Benyo, Richard, (1991) The Death Valley 300: Near Death and Resurrection on the World's Toughest Endurance Course, Specific Publications, ISBN 0-915373-01-7
- Benyo, Richard, (1992) Making the Marathon your Event, Random House, ISBN 0-679-73930-0
- Benyo, Richard, (1998) Running Past 50, Human Kinetics Publishers, ISBN 0-88011-705-2
- Benyo, Richard, (and Joe Henderson) (2002) Running Encyclopedia, Human Kinetics Publishers, ISBN 0-7360-3734-9
