= Catherine Cassidy (disambiguation) =

Catherine Cassidy is an American writer and editor.

Catherine Cassidy may also refer to:

- Cathy Cassidy, author of teenage fiction
- Katie Cassidy, American actress
- Kate Cassidy, character in Life Unexpected

== See also ==
- Cassidy (surname)
