= DC Rainmaker =

Sports technology blog

- Website type: Sports technology blog
- Available in: English language
- Owner: Ray Maker
- Website: dcrainmaker.com
- Commercial: Yes
- Launched: September 2007; 19 years ago

DC Rainmaker is a blog by Ray Maker that reviews technology used for runners, cyclists, and triathletes. It was started in September 2007.

Maker has said that an early review of the Garmin Forerunner 305 began as an email to an internal Microsoft group for triathletes, which he subsequently adapted into a blog post.

In the February 2015 web traffic chart of ad-supported bike websites, DC Rainmaker was listed sixth in terms of North American traffic and overall traffic by Bicycle Retailer & Industry News (BRAIN). BRAIN described DC Rainmaker as the "paper of record" for bicycling technology and highlighted his strong ethical independence: Maker does not accept free product or travel from companies, nor does he accept advertising from them. However, DC Rainmaker does earn money from links provided to the products on Amazon and receives products in beta stage from companies.

Maker was listed in Runner's World as one of "The 50 Most Influential People In Running".
