= DeBarra Mayo =

DeBarra Mayo (born 1953, Omaha, Nebraska) is an American health and fitness advocate, writer and media personality. She has epilepsy, which has led her to a career involved with maintaining and enhancing health. She has written regularly on the subject of health and wellness in books, magazines and newspapers, as well as on radio and television broadcasts. Mayo has been an award-winning women's bodybuilder and trainer for the West Virginia University football team.

== Life and work ==
Since childhood, DeBarra Mayo has suffered from neurological symptoms, including loss of muscle control and drop attacks. These episodes progressed into her adult life and became more frequent. She began weightlifting, yoga, and focusing on good nutrition in an effort to cope with her symptoms. This led her to becoming a health and fitness trainer and writer.

In 1982, she won the overall title "Ms. Gold Ring Classic", as well as the "Most Muscular" trophy and a first place for her height and weight class. At 5'3" Mayo competed at a body weight of 107-112 lbs. In 1984, she retired from competitive bodybuilding.

Mayo's writings have been published both nationally and internationally. She became a nationally recognized celebrity as a champion bodybuilder, fitness expert, and freelance writer. She wrote a weekly column for the Mid-Week News Magazine, which featured a wide variety of fitness tips and information. For many of her articles she demonstrated exercise routines.

In 1983, she began writing features and modeling exercise routines for FIT, a new women's magazine with a global circulation. The magazine featured celebrities, including Jane Fonda, Raquel Welch, Jaclyn Smith, Lisa Hartman, Donna Mills, and Rachel McLish.

Its founder Bob Anderson (also founder of Runner's World magazine) was recognized by US President Ronald Reagan for his contributions, through his publications, to health and fitness in the USA.

Mayo has made numerous public guest appearances, and has been featured on many television and radio talk shows. In 1983, Mayo was a television guest on Pittsburgh Today with two Pittsburgh Steelers football team players, Franco Harris and Rick Woods. It became national news when she gave them an arm workout on air, and Harris nicknamed her "Killer". As a result, WVU football coach Don Nehlen recruited her to train his squad, and the Wheeling News-Register published an article, "The Girl Who Could Take on Franco Harris". Don Nehlen credited DeBarra Mayo with providing his team with an "edge" during the 1983 season.

In 1986, Mayo became aerobics editor and monthly columnist for FIT magazine. She worked with Denise Austin, who also wrote a monthly column.

Anderson World published two books by Mayo, The Runner's World Yoga Book II, and Women's Bodybuilding for Beginners.

In 1986, she began writing a column, entitled "DeBarra Mayo on Fitness", for the Erie Daily Times, Erie, Pennsylvania. This was syndicated to The Gettysburg Times. In the same year she became a member of The Authors Guild, a society of published authors.

During the 1980s, Mayo was the star of a radio exercise show.

Mayo married in 1998.

In November 1999, she publicly announced that she had epilepsy with a four-part series, Living with Epilepsy, on stayhealthy.com, for Epilepsy Awareness Month, and in a newspaper feature in the Fayetteville Observer. In the interview with the Observer, she revealed that she had attempted to hide her condition, since she was a teenager, and had tried to make her body as healthy as possible to compensate for the condition. In the interview, she said that she became an overachiever in an effort to tell herself that she was okay.

Due to complications relating to epilepsy, she withdrew from public life for several years. She founded an effort called The Epilepsy Awareness Mission to act as a support and advocacy group, and she was elected to the Board of Directors of the North Carolina Epilepsy Foundation (associated with the Epilepsy Information Service, Wake Forest University)

In 2005, she became part of the Karate Team at the United States Karate Academy, Bellevue, Nebraska, and in 2006 she received a trophy for her karate board-breaking skill.

She is currently working on two books, which are scheduled for release in 2007. She recently began writing a weekly column entitled "Bikini Body Fitness by DeBarra Mayo". She continues to appear as a guest speaker at events.

== Guest appearances ==
Mayo has appeared as a celebrity athlete at events including the SuperShow in Atlanta, GA, where she represented Nike as part of their Body Elite program, designed to highlight aeobics apparel for women (Mayo's aerobics wear was provided by Nike during the late 1980s). In 1983, she was a Guest Judge at the Golden Body Contest, hosted by Gold's Gym, Hagerstown, MD. In 1985, she appeared as a sportsworld celebrity champion at the Meadville Area Sportsmen's Banquet, honoring 1984 Olympic Gold Medalist Bruce Baumgartner. Mayo has also appeared as a guest instructor at health clubs, seminars, athletic events and shopping malls, and has hosted aerobic fundraising events.

== Books ==
- Mayo, DeBarra, Runner's World Yoga Book II, Anderson World Books, Inc. 1983, ISBN 978-0-89037-274-6
- Mayo, DeBarra, with Joseph Mayo, Women's Bodybuilding for Beginners, Anderson World Books, Inc. 1983, ISBN 978-0-89037-290-6

== Notes and references ==
Additional references

- Palmerine, Don, "Champion Woman Body Builder Promotes Worth of Well-Fit Body" (includes photo) Times West Virginian, Fairmont, West Virginia, Sunday August 15, 1982 (Archives at Fairmont State Library, Fairmont, West Virginia.
- Brook, Susan, "Inside: Body building it," section D-3, Press Enterprise, Bloomsburg, Pennsylvania (August 7–8, 1982, Archives at Bloomsburg University Library, Bloomsburg, Pennsylvania)freelancing tips in 2014
- Staff, "Ex-Area woman passes on message", The Danville News, Danville, Pennsylvania (April 9, 1985; Archives at Thomas Beaver Free Library, Danville, Pennsylvania).
