= Reece James (disambiguation) =

Reece James (born 1999) is an English footballer who plays for Chelsea and England.

Reece or Rhys James may also refer to:

- Reece James (footballer, born 1993), English footballer who plays for Rotherham
- Rhys James (born 1991), English comedian

== See also ==
- James Reece (disambiguation)
