= Joe Henderson (runner) =

American runner (born 1943)

Joe Henderson (born June 3, 1943) is an American runner, running coach, writer, and former chief editor of Runner's World magazine. He currently writes for Marathon & Beyond magazine, and since 1982, has written a weekly column entitled "Joe Henderson's Running Commentary". He has authored and coauthored more than two dozen books about the sport of running and fitness, including the best-selling Marathon Training.

== Life and work ==
Joe Henderson was born in Illinois and raised in Iowa. He became an avid runner at age 14, and was an Iowa state high school track and cross country champion. He ran for Drake University, then started his writing career at the Des Moines Register in 1966. He wrote for Track and Field News from 1967 to 1969.

In 1970, Henderson joined Bob Anderson as chief editor for Runner's World magazine. He brought aboard Dr. George Sheehan as the magazine's medical editor, after being introduced to him by Hal Higdon during the 1968 Summer Olympics (Higdon was writing features for Runner's World at the time). Henderson wrote articles for Runner's World for 33 years. He was Bob Anderson's first full-time employee.

In 2001, Henderson co-authored The Running Encyclopedia with Richard Benyo. He appears as a keynote speaker at running expos and events, and is recognized as one of the world's foremost authorities on running.

He currently teaches running classes at the University of Oregon and coaches marathon training teams in Eugene, Oregon.

== Books ==
- Long, Slow Distance (1969), Tafnews Press, ISBN 0-911520-12-0
- Road Racers and Their Training (1970), Tafnews Press, ISBN 0-911520-14-7
- Thoughts on the Run (1970), Runner's World, ASIN B0006CKG2O
- Run Gently, Run Long (1974), Anderson World, ISBN 0-89037-040-0
- The Long Run Solution (1976), Anderson World, ISBN 0-02-499300-X
- Jog, Run, Race (1978), Anderson World, ISBN 0-89037-122-9
- The Running Revolution (1980) Cedarwinds Pub. Co., ISBN 978-0-915297-16-0); Gemini Books, ASIN B0006XOC82
- Running, A to Z (1983), Stephen Greene Press, ISBN 0-8289-0504-5
- Running Your Best Race (1984), W.C. Brown Publishers, ISBN 0-697-00458-9
- Running for Fitness, for Sport and for Life (1985), W.C. Brown, ISBN 0-697-00144-X
- Joe Henderson's Running Handbook (1985), W.C. Brown, ISBN 0-697-00795-2
- Run Farther, Run Faster (1985), Anderson World, ISBN 0-02-028240-0
- Total Fitness (1988), W.C. Brown, ISBN 0-697-00240-3
- Think Fast: Mental Toughness Training for Runners (1991), Plume, ISBN 0-452-26610-6
- Masters Running and Racing (with Bill Rodgers and Priscilla Welch) (1995) Rodale Books, ISBN 0-87596-330-7
- Fitness Running (with Richard L. Brown) (1994), 1st edition, Human Kinetics Publishers, ISBN 0-87322-451-5
- Running Injury Free (with Joe Ellis) (1994), Rodale Books, ISBN 0-87596-221-1
- Fitness Running (with Richard L. Brown) (2003), 2nd edition, Human Kinetics, ISBN 0-7360-4510-4
- Did I Win? (A Farewell to George Sheehan) (1994), WRS Publishing, ISBN 1-56796-066-9
- Better Runs (Foreword by Jeff Galloway) (1995), Human Kinetics, ISBN 0-87322-866-9
- Road Racers and Their Training (1995), 2nd edition, Tafnews Press, ISBN 0-911521-44-5
- Marathon Training (1997), 1st edition, Human Kinetics, ISBN 0-88011-591-2
- Coaching Cross-Country Successfully (with Joe Newton) (1997), Human Kinetics, ISBN 0-88011-701-X
- Best Runs (1999), Human Kinetics, ISBN 0-88011-896-2
- Running 101 (2000), Human Kinetics, ISBN 0-7360-3056-5
- The Running Encyclopedia (with Richard Benyo) (2001), Human Kinetics, ISBN 0-7360-4510-4
- Fitness Running (with Richard Brown) (2003), 2nd edition, Human Kinetics, ISBN 0-7360-4510-4
- Marathon Training (2004), 2nd edition, Human Kinetics, ISBN 0-7360-5191-0
- Run Right Now (Foreword by Richard Benyo) (2004), Barnes & Noble, ISBN 0-7607-5462-4
- Run Right Now Training Log (2005), Barnes & Noble, ISBN 0-7607-7236-3

== Video/DVD ==
- Running and Racing with Joe Henderson, (2003)

== See also ==
- Long slow distance
- Paul Reese
