= James Reece =

James Reece may refer to:

- James Gordon Reece (1929–2001), British journalist and television producer
- Jimmy Reece (1929–1958), American racecar driver

== See also ==
- James Reese (disambiguation)
- Reece James (disambiguation)
