= John Bingham (runner) =

American distance runner

John Bingham (born 1948) is an American marathon runner and author, nicknamed "The Penguin", who has achieved widespread recognition for promoting the walking of long-distance race courses to the general public.

Bingham is the author of several books and the No Need for Speed column in Runner's World. He believes that the goals of running are to have fun and finish—and that for a vast majority of amateur athletes running fast should not be the only aim.

His philosophies are often challenged and dismissed by runners, who feel that Bingham's "penguins" have lowered the bar for athletic achievement.

He has completed over 40 marathons and many shorter races.

In June 2014 Bingham announced that he would retire from writing and public speaking at the end of the year.

== Bibliography ==
- Bingham, John (1999). The Courage To Start : A Guide To Running for Your Life. Fireside. ISBN 0-684-85455-4.
- Bingham, John (2002). No Need for Speed : A Beginner's Guide to the Joy of Running. Rodale Books. ISBN 1-57954-429-0.
- Bingham, John; Hadfield, Jenny (2003). Marathoning for Mortals : A Regular Person's Guide to the Joy of Running or Walking a Half-Marathon or Marathon. Rodale Books. ISBN 1-57954-782-6.
- Bingham, John; Hadfield, Jenny (2007). Running for Mortals : a commonsense plan for changing your life through running. Rodale Books. ISBN 978-1-59486-325-7.
- Bingham, John (2011). An Accidental Athlete : A Funny Thing Happened on the Way to Middle Age. Velo Press. ISBN 978-1-93403-073-8.
