= Clyde L. Reese =

American judge (1958–2022)

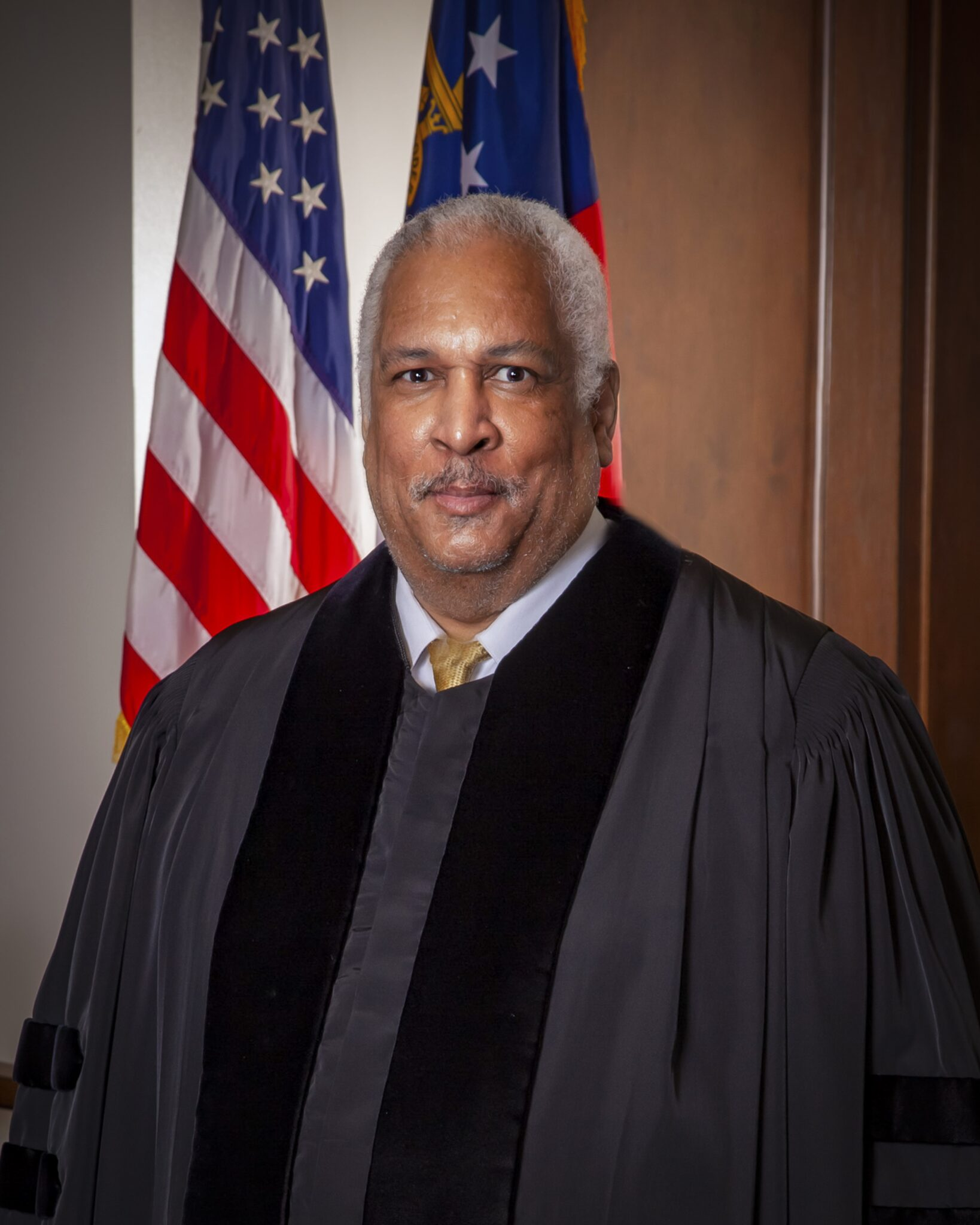

Judge of the Georgia Court of Appeals
- In office December 1, 2016 – December 17, 2022
- Appointed by: Nathan Deal
- Preceded by: Herbert E. Phipps
- Succeeded by: vacant

Personal details
- Born: Clyde Lowaine Reese III; December 8, 1958 Florence, South Carolina, U.S.
- Died: December 17, 2022 (aged 64)
- Education: Georgia State University (BA); Mercer University (JD)

Clyde Lowaine Reese III known professionally as Clyde L. Reese (December 8, 1958 – December 17, 2022) was an American lawyer who served as a judge of the Georgia Court of Appeals.

== Early life and education ==
Reese was born in Florence, South Carolina, on December 8, 1958. He, along with his cousin, Marsha Reese and her cousin, Alonzo Brown, were some of the first students to integrate Pace Academy in 1969, he graduated from Pace Academy in 1976. He attended Georgia State University and received a Bachelor of Arts in 1980. He received a Juris Doctor from Mercer University School of Law in 1996.

== Career ==
=== Private practice ===
In 2003, Reese left state government for the private practice of law. From 2003 to 2004, he practiced with Rod Meadows at Meadows & Lewis in Stockbridge, Georgia. From 2004 to 2007 he was owner and principal of Reese & Hopkins, LLC, a firm specializing in state and federal health care regulatory matters.

=== State service ===
In the summer of 1996, Reese began work as an assistant attorney general in the Georgia Department of Law under Attorney General Mike Bowers. He was later hired as counsel for the Department of Insurance, the Subsequent Injury Trust Fund, and the State Health Planning Agency.

In the fall of 2007, Reese returned to state government with Department of Community Health (DCH) to oversee the Certificate of Need program and as general counsel. In May 2010, Governor Sonny Perdue appointed him as Commissioner of DCH. In January 2011, Governor Nathan Deal appointed Reese as Commissioner of the Department of Human Services.

On May 30, 2013, Governor Nathan Deal appointed Reese to be the commissioner of the Department of Community Health. He served in that capacity until his appointment to the Court of Appeals.

=== Judicial service ===
On October 31, 2016, Governor Nathan Deal appointed Reese to a seat on the Georgia Court of Appeals being vacated by the retirement of Judge Herbert E. Phipps. He began active service on the court on December 1, 2016.

== Personal life and death ==
Reese was the father of five children. He was a resident of Douglas County, Georgia. He died unexpectedly on December 17, 2022, at the age of 64.

Legal offices
| Preceded by Herbert E. Phipps | Judge of the Georgia Court of Appeals; 2016–2022 | Vacant |
