= James Reese =

James, Jim, Jimmy or Jimmie Reese may refer to:

== Sportsmen ==
- Jimmie Reese (1901–1994), American baseball infielder and coach
- Jimmy Reese (1912–1978), American baseball pitcher in Negro leagues
- James Reese (American football) (born 1968), head coach at Tennessee State University

== Others ==
- James W. Reese (1920–1943), American army recipient of World War II Medal of Honor
- Jim Reese (musician) (1941–1991), American guitarist and vocalist with The Bobby Fuller Four
- Jim Reese (Oklahoma politician) (born 1957), American state legislator and commissioner
- James Reese (author) (born 1964), American novelist of Herculine Trilogy

== See also ==
- James Reece (disambiguation)
- Jimmy Rees (born 1987), Australian comedy actor
