= Charles Chandler Reese =

American illustrator, cartoonist, and artist

- Born: May 1862; Pittsburgh, Pennsylvania, U.S.
- Died: July 3, 1936 (aged 74); Glendale, California, U.S.

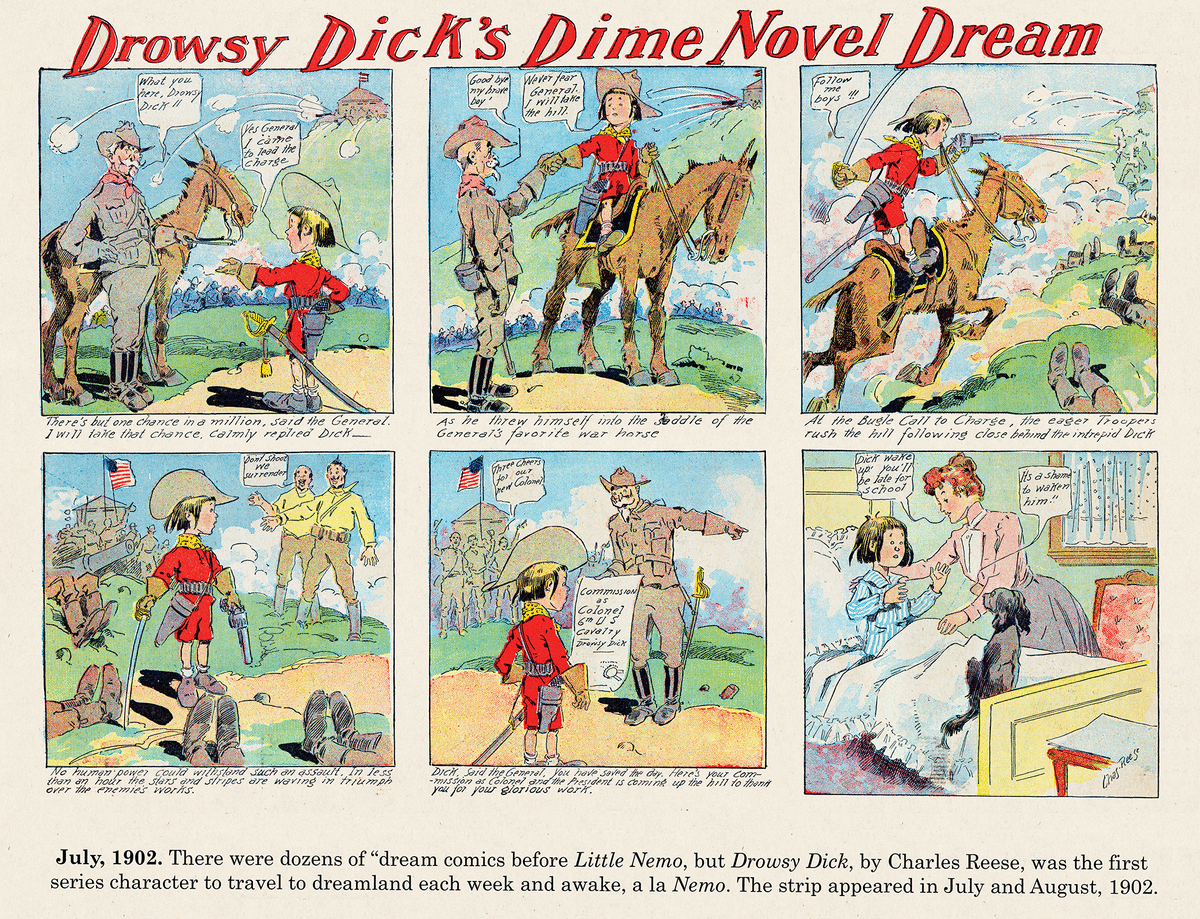
Drowsy Dick's Dime Novel Dream, a July 1902 comic strip by Charles Chandler Reese published in the New York Herald

Charles Chandler Reese (May 1862 – July 3, 1936) was a well-known American illustrator, newspaper cartoonist, and artist who worked for newspapers in Boston, Massachusetts; Pittsburgh, Pennsylvania; Philadelphia, Pennsylvania; and New York City. His sketches on the field of action in Cuba during the Spanish-American War appeared in the New York World. His two-time comic strip, Speaking of Ancestors, appeared in the Philadelphia North American in February 1904. He also contributed cartoon series to the Boston Herald and New York Tribune. He was the first artist to have a picture reproduced as a double-truck, or two-page, illustration in a newspaper. He was the younger brother of American journalist Cara Reese. His parents were Abram or Abraham Reese, who came from Wales, and Mary Godwin Reese, who came from England. He also had three brothers: Harry, Arthur, and Stanley. Reese served for decades in the 18th Regiment of the National Guard, enlisting in 1876 and serving as an Adjutant in 1892. He married a woman named Bertha in 1895 and divorced her for infidelity in 1913. He later remarried by 1920 to a woman named Eloise and had a daughter, also named Eloise or Elsie, and was living in Staten Island, New York, and working as an artist for a press company, according to U.S. census data. He relocated to California in 1930, where he worked as an independent artist, and died in Glendale, California in 1936.
