= D. H. Reese =

Louisiana state representative

Daniel H. Reese (fl. 1860s) was an American publisher and political leader in Louisiana. He was a delegate at the Louisiana Constitutional Convention of 1868. He edited the Lafourche Republican in Thibodaux, Louisiana.

Fellow Lafourche Parish representative William Murrell nominated Reese to be speaker of the Louisiana House. He served as president of the school board. He received a contract to publish the laws of the General Assembly.
