= John Rees (cricketer) =

Australian cricketer

Personal information
- Full name: John Newman Stace Rees
- Born: 2 September 1880; Adelaide, Australia
- Died: 17 January 1959 (aged 78)
- Source: Cricinfo, 21 September 2020

John Newman Stace Rees (2 September 1880 – 17 January 1959) was an Australian footballer and cricketer.

Rees played in one first-class match for South Australia in 1905/06. In the match between South Australia and Western Australia in Perth in January 1906, Rees opened the batting in the first innings and carried his bat, finishing 21 not out in South Australia's score of 54. He made a stumping when he kept wicket for a time in Western Australia's second innings. His brother Robert, a leg-spin bowler, played 13 first-class matches for South Australia between 1903 and 1913.

Rees was more prominent as an Australian rules footballer. He played 103 games for North Adelaide from 1898 to 1908 as a wingman, renowned for his speed. He was a member of North Adelaide's premiership teams in 1902 and 1905.

== See also ==
- List of South Australian representative cricketers
