= Jerry Reese (disambiguation) =

Jerry Reese (born 1963) is an American football executive.

Jerry Reese may also refer to:

- Jerry Reese (defensive lineman) (born 1964), American football player
- Jerry Reese (wide receiver) (born 1973), American football player
