= Carl Reese =

Carl Reese may refer to:

- Carl Reese (American football) (1942/1943–2025), American football coach
- Carl Reese (driver), American endurance driver and motorcyclist
