= Bob Cooper (journalist) =

Bob Cooper is an American freelance journalist. He is a travel, sports, and general-interest writer as well as a copyeditor for authors. He is a former contributing editor for Runner's World, a former executive editor of Running Times, a competitive long distance runner, and a longtime San Francisco Bay Area resident. He has held editorial positions for Triathlete and Inside Triathlon magazines.

== Running and racing ==
Cooper has run 10 ultramarathons and 35 marathons. As a teenager, he was part of a cross country relay run that traversed the length of the United States from the Pacific Ocean to the Atlantic Ocean in 19+ days. He has won numerous running races, ranging from the mile to the 50K distance, and has a marathon best of 2:26:11. He has also completed many bike events, ranging from 30 to 102 miles, and won 66 consecutive boat-class wins in kayak races from 2005 to 2024.

== Journalism career ==
Runner's World published Cooper's first national magazine article, and he continued to write for Runner's World after the magazine was sold to Rodale, Inc. in Emmaus, Pennsylvania. His articles have appeared regularly in magazines including The Wall Street Journal, Men's Fitness, Global Traveler, National Geographic Traveler, Wired, and dozens of others.

After serving as an executive editor for Running Times, Cooper became a full-time freelance writer while continuing to work as a regular contributor to Runner's World. Currently, he is primarily a book editor; he has copyedited about 200 books.
