= Catherine Cassidy =

American writer and editor

Catherine M. Cassidy (b. 1959, Pennsylvania) is an American writer and editor. She is a former editor-in-chief of Prevention and Taste of Home magazines, as well as the author of Win the Fat War for Moms.

She is currently employed as the vice president of marketing by the Beacon Business Group in Wisconsin.

== Formative years ==
Catherine M. Cassidy was born in the Commonwealth of Pennsylvania in the United States in 1959. She was awarded a Bachelor of Arts degree in journalism by San Jose State University.

In 2007, she resided with her family in Wisconsin, where she was employed as the editor-in-chief of Taste of Home, an affiliate of Reader's Digest.

== Career ==
During her editorial career, Cassidy helped to develop more than two hundred publications on topics pertaining to health, nutrition, and fitness. The former managing editor of FIT magazine, which was published by Bob Anderson and Runner's World, she has also worked to develop multiple books, articles and magazines.

Cassidy was hired as the executive editor of Prevention in 1997 and was then promoted to the position of editor-in-chief of that publication, a position that she held until 2003, when she stepped down to devote more time to her family. Prevention became the largest health publication and fourteenth largest magazine in the United States.

In 2004, Cassidy was named senior vice president and editor-in-chief of Reiman Publications, a unit of The Reader's Digest Association with publications in nineteen languages and forty-eight editions sold in more than sixty countries. She oversaw Taste of Home, the largest food magazine in North America, with a paid circulation of 3.5 million.

Still editor-in-chief of Taste of Home in 2012, Cassidy oversaw a redesign of the brand's magazine in 2011.

In 2017, she was hired as the vice president of marketing for the Beacon Business Group, which has offices in Madison and Milwaukee, Wisconsin.

== Bibliography ==
- Cassidy, Catherine, Win the Fat War for Moms, 113 real-life secrets to losing postpregnancy pounds, (2001) Rodale Press, ISBN 1-57954-426-6
- Cassidy, Catherine and the editors of FIT, Figure Maintenance (1983), Anderson World Books, ISBN 0-89037-255-1
