= Cara Reese =

American muckraking journalist

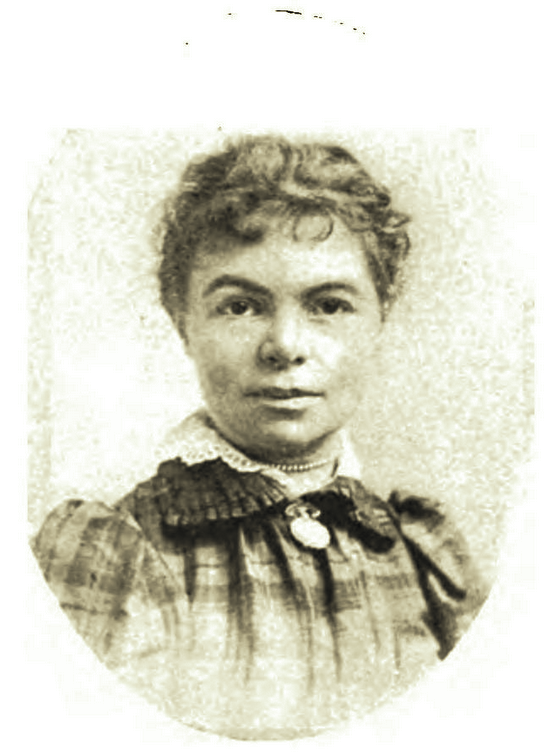
- Cara Reese, pictured in 1896
- Born: Caroline Godwin Reese; October 1856; Pittsburgh, Pennsylvania, U.S.
- Died: March 12, 1914 (aged 57); Pittsburgh, Pennsylvania, U.S.
- Occupation: Journalist
- Relatives: Charles Chandler Reese (brother)

Caroline Godwin "Cara" Reese (October 1856 – March 12, 1914), was an American muckraking journalist from Pittsburgh, Pennsylvania, who gained fame from covering the 1889 Johnstown Flood in Johnstown, Pennsylvania.

== Biography ==
Reese was listed in U.S. Census records as "Carrie". Her parents were Abram or Abraham Reese, who was originally from Wales and worked in iron manufacturing, and Mary Godwin Reese, who was originally from England. In addition to Charles Chandler Reese, her brothers included Harry, Arthur, and Stanley. She was a graduate of the Female Institute Department of Bucknell University, Lewisburg, Pennsylvania and was the only woman to graduate in the University of Pittsburgh's first class of journalism majors. She was a member of the Baptist Church.

She died at her home in Pittsburgh on March 12, 1914.

== Career ==
Cara Reese was a staff writer on several Pittsburgh newspapers, was a regular contributor to Good Housekeeping Magazine, wrote several books, and was an accomplished public speaker who represented the women of Western Pennsylvania at world congresses and meetings of the General Federation of Women's Clubs.

== Johnstown Flood ==
Reese was already well known in the journalism field because she wrote a segment for the Commercial Gazette called Cara's Column. She arrived in Johnstown with her brother, Charles Chandler Reese, a well-known illustrator whose work had appeared in newspapers in Boston, Massachusetts; Philadelphia, Pennsylvania, Pittsburgh, Pennsylvania; and New York City. Cara Reese's notes and sketches about the disaster in Johnstown later were published in the Pittsburgh Dispatch with the headline "WIPED OUT BY WATER. Johnstown the Pretty Mountain City, Swept From the Surface of the Earth." Historians had initially concluded that the illustrations had been done by Charles Reese, but later determined that the sketches of the disaster were the work of Cara Reese rather than her brother.

Reese traveled to and reported on other natural disasters from unsafe locations, drawing criticism from members of the Women's Press Club of Pittsburgh, of which she was a founding member, for putting herself in danger and going to places considered unsuitable for women. They tried unsuccessfully to have her expelled from the organization. Other female journalists defended her. All of her reporting from flooded, muddy terrain was done wearing the long skirts and petticoats of the day. Unlike other 19th century female journalists, Reese used her real name instead of a pen name.
