= Joan Ullyot =

American runner (1940–2021)

- Joan Ullyot, from a 1982 newspaper

Personal information
- Born: Joan Lamb; July 1, 1940 Chicago, Illinois, US
- Died: June 18, 2021 (aged 80) Palo Alto, California, US

Sport
- Country: United States
- Sport: Women's athletics

Achievements and titles
- Personal best: Marathon: 2:47:39 (St. George Marathon 1988)

Joan Ullyot (nee Lamb, July 1, 1940 – June 18, 2021) was an American physician, author, and runner. She was one of the key figures in successfully lobbying for a women's marathon in the Olympic Games. Ullyot herself won ten marathons, and won the masters category at the Boston Marathon in 1984.

== Early life and education ==
Joan Wingate Lamb was born on July 1, 1940, in Chicago, Illinois. Her father, Theodore Lamb, died in 1943. Her mother Deborah remarried, to a man named William Gelette. They moved to Manhattan and then, later on, to Pasadena, California, where she attended the Westridge School. She went to Wellesley College, graduating with a degree in German literature in 1961. She graduated from Harvard Medical School in 1966.

== Career ==
Ullyot was an exercise physiologist associated with the Institute of Health Research in San Francisco, and a project director at the Research Institute of Laboratory Medicine at the Pacific Medical Center. In 1976, she published the book Women's Running, in which she countered common arguments that women were not built for running long distances. It was one of the first books discussing this topic. She also wrote Running Free: A Book for Women Runners and their Friends (1980), and an updated edition of her first book, The New Women's Running (1984). She also wrote a column in Runner's World magazine, and consulted and lectured on women's nutrition and fitness.

When the IOC program committee asked for "further studies on the physiological and psychological effects of competitive marathon running on women" in April 1980, Ullyot compiled medical evidence to make the affirmative case for including the marathon in the Olympics. In response, the IOC program committee approved the marathon at their next meeting in February 1981.

== Running ==
Ullyot won ten marathons, and won the masters category at the Boston Marathon in 1984. In 1975, she placed sixth in the first International Women's Marathon, held in Germany. In 1977, she won the women's category of the first Bloomsday Run in Spokane.

== Awards and honors ==
Ullyot was inducted into the Road Runners Club of America Distance Running Hall of Fame in 2019.

== Personal life ==
In 1965 Joan Lamb married fellow physician Daniel Ullyot. They had two sons and were divorced in 1976. In 1990, Ullyot married Dr. Charles E. Becker. She died in Palo Alto, California, in 2021, aged 80 years.

== Books ==
- Women's Running (World Publications, 1976)
- Running free: a book for women runners and their friends (Putnam, 1980)
- The New Women’s Running (Stephen Greene Press, 1984)
