= Charles Reese (politician) =

American politician

Charles Reese was a state legislator in Mississippi. He represented Hinds County, Mississippi in the Mississippi House of Representatives in 1872 to 1873. In April 1872 he signed, along with many representatives and senators, a petition for the equal rights and treatment of African Americans many of whom had been freed from slavery during and after the American Civil War.

He was born circa 1835 in Mississippi, worked as a farm laborer and served as an inspector in the 1871 special election in Hinds County.

== See also ==
- African American officeholders from the end of the Civil War until before 1900
