= Jonny Rees =

HK rugby union player

Jonny Rees is a current Hong Kong Rugby Union player. He plays for the Hong Kong Football Club, the Hong Kong National Team and previously for the Hong Kong Sevens team. Rees made his international debut in 2012 at the 2012 Cup of Nations tournament in Dubai against Zimbabwe. He featured in the 2013 Asian Five Nations match against the Philippines where he scored two tries to help Hong Kong to a 59 – 20 victory in Manila. He had also scored two tries earlier in the tournament against the United Arab Emirates beating them 53 – 7.

Rees was included in the squad to the 2015 Asian Rugby Championship.
