= Frederick Reese (disambiguation) =

Frederick Reese may refer to:

- Frederick D. Reese (1929–2018), African-American civil rights activist from Selma, Alabama
- Frederick F. Reese (James Frederick Rees; 1854–1936), 238th bishop of the Episcopal Church in the United States of America

== See also ==
- Frederick Rees (1883–1967), Welsh historian and academic
