= John Reese =

John Reese may refer to:

== People ==
- John Reese (baseball) (1895–?), outfielder in the Negro leagues
- John Reese (cricketer) (1877–1971), New Zealand cricketer
- John D. Reese (1855–1931), American Major League Baseball trainer
- John H. Reese (1910–1981), American author of Western fiction
- John N. Reese Jr. (1923–1945), American posthumous Medal of Honor recipient in World War II
- John P. Reese (born 1953), American money manager and financial columnist
- John Earl Reese (1939–1955), murdered African American teenager
- John Terence Reese (1913–1996), British bridge player and writer
- John Reese, American musical producer for the Uproar Festival

== Characters ==
- John Reese (Person of Interest), a main character from the television series Person of Interest
- John Connor, alias in television series Terminator: The Sarah Connor Chronicles

== See also ==
- John Rees (disambiguation)
- John Reese Kenly (1818–1891), American lawyer and Union general in the American Civil War
- John Rhys (1840–1915), scholar
- John Rhys-Davies (born 1944), Welsh actor
