= Bart Yasso =

American long-distance runner

Bart Yasso, born in December 1955 in Fountain Hill, Pennsylvania, the "mayor of running", is Runner's World's former Chief Running Officer. Yasso is one of a few people to have completed races on all seven continents, including the Mount Kilimanjaro marathon, and won the 1987 U.S. National Biathlon Long Course Championship. At the time of his retirement, he had run in more than 1,200 of the 1,800 races he attended. His book, Race Everything, highlights some of his favorite races.

Among marathon trainers, Yasso is the namesake of the "Yasso 800s," believed to be an indication of marathon goal time.

He is a member of the Running USA Hall of Champions for both his accomplishments and his work to promote the sport of running.
