= Charley Reese =

American journalist (1937–2013)

- Born: January 29, 1937; Washington, Georgia, U.S.
- Died: May 21, 2013 (aged 76); Orlando, Florida, U.S.
- Resting place: Barrancas National Cemetery; Pensacola, Florida
- Other name: Charles E. Reese
- Occupations: Journalist, syndicated columnist

Charley Reese (January 29, 1937 – May 21, 2013) was an American syndicated columnist known for his conservative views. He was associated with the Orlando Sentinel from 1971 to 2001, both as a writer and in various editorial capacities. King Features Syndicate distributed his column, which was published three times per week.

== Early years ==
Reese, of British and Irish ancestry, was born in Washington in Wilkes County in eastern Georgia, and reared in Georgia, East Texas, and the Florida Panhandle. He worked summer and weekend jobs starting at 11; at 13, he became a janitor in a printing shop. In 1955, he became a cub reporter for the Pensacola News in Pensacola, Florida. Later that year, he bought a one-way ticket to England, where he took a job as caption writer with Planet Newspapers Ltd. in London.

In 1957, Reese returned to America, serving two years in the United States Army as a tank gunner. He returned to reporting after having spent six years in advertising and public relations and having also worked as an advance man and speechwriter in various political campaigns from 1969 to 1971.

== Political views and affiliations ==
Reese was a conservative (despite supporting same-sex marriage), with many libertarian views, but he called himself "almost, but not quite, a libertarian" as he decried capitalism's poor treatment of workers. Nonetheless, he contributed regularly to libertarian websites such as LewRockwell.com and Antiwar.com. In 2004, he said "I am a traditional conservative, not a neo– or paleo– or any of those other buglike classifications".

Reese was initially a registered Democrat. In his December 26, 2005 column, he wrote that he switched from Democrat to Republican after John F. Kennedy was elected U.S. president in 1960. He considered Kennedy a failed president, but his harshest presidential criticisms were reserved for his fellow native Georgian, Jimmy Carter. After the presidency of George H. W. Bush of Texas (1989–1993), Reese returned to the Democratic Party because he considered Bush a "Rockefeller Republican".

Reese was a member of the Sons of Confederate Veterans. He had also been a member of the League of the South. Defending the South's position in the Civil War was a common theme of his writings, in which he frequently used Confederate anecdotes as illustrations. He considered the American Civil War to have been caused by sectional differences, not slavery. His writings repeatedly praised Robert E. Lee and vilified Abraham Lincoln. He was a member of the National Rifle Association of America, a staunch defender of the Second Amendment to the United States Constitution and a critic of gun control. In his final years, he devoted many of his columns in support of a non-interventionist foreign policy.

Reese strongly supported Patrick J. Buchanan for president in the 1996 Republican primaries against Robert J. Dole. Although he supported George W. Bush for president in 2000 (and his endorsement was seen as having been important to Bush's victory, given the closeness of the Florida election numbers), he was thereafter an outspoken critic of the Bush administration and an opponent of the War in Iraq. In 2004, he supported Democrat John Kerry's presidential campaign.

In 1999, when C-SPAN viewers were asked to vote for their favorite columnist, Reese finished in first place. In 2000, U.S. Representative John Duncan, Jr., a Tennessee Republican, entered Reese's column into the Congressional Record, in opposition to the actions taken by Janet Reno's Justice Department in the Elian Gonzalez affair. More recently, Congressman Duncan cited Reese in multiple speeches on the House floor to support his view that the Iraq War violates conservative principles.

After leaving the Orlando Sentinel, in 2001, Reese wrote for the Washington Report on Middle Eastern Affairs; he continued to publish columns for King Features Syndicate until 2008.

An article written by Reese for the Orlando Sentinel on March 7, 1995, under the title "Looking For Someone To Blame? Congress Is Good Place To Start" was widely read and distributed in modified form via e-mail during the 2008 United States presidential campaign under the title "The 545 People Responsible for America's Woes". The article commonly forwarded in 2008 was slightly modified from the 1980s version, substituting Nancy Pelosi for Tip O'Neil and adding a reference to Iraq. It is not clear if the modifications were made by Reese, as the e-mail claimed. Quote from the original 1985 article:

One hundred senators, 435 congressmen, one president and nine Supreme Court justices – 545 human beings out of the 235 million – are directly, legally, morally and individually responsible for the domestic problems that plague this country.

Reese had written a similar article in 1983. In that version, he listed 546 people, including Vice President George H. W. Bush

In 1989, Reese published a pro-second amendment column for the Orlando Sentinel in which he quoted Thomas Jefferson as having said, "The strongest reason for the people to retain the right to keep and bear arms is, as a last resort, to protect themselves against tyranny in government." This quote gained widespread popularity via social media during the 2012–2013 gun control debate after the Sandy Hook Elementary School shooting. However, Monticello has stated that no such evidence exists to support that Thomas Jefferson ever made this statement and credits Reese as the originator of this quote.

At the end of each calendar year, Reese wrote his annual "conflict of interest" column, in which he disclosed his sources of income, his political affiliation and the organizations of which he was a dues-paying member. He also stated his basic political philosophy and other core beliefs in this annual column. He stated that readers should have an idea of a columnist's background from which conflicts of interest could arise but that to his knowledge, he was the only columnist that carried out this practice.

In his August 30, 2008 column at lewrockwell.com, Reese said he was retiring and would no longer do any writing. The site had been running his old columns for several weeks, stating that Reese was on medical leave.

== Retirement and death ==
Reese wrote his last column for the Orlando Sentinel on July 29, 2001, but continued to supply columns for distribution by King Features Syndicate until 2008. In 2011, he resided in Casselberry in Seminole County in east central Florida.

Reese died in Orlando, Florida, on May 21, 2013, after 3 1/2 months of hospitalization. As a veteran he was interred at Barrancas National Cemetery in Pensacola, Florida.

== Books ==
- Great Gods of the Potomac 197 pages, Sentinel Star (1978) (No ISBN)
- Common Sense for the 80's 170 pages, Sun Belt Syndicate (1981) (No ISBN)
