= Harry Hlavac =

Harry F. Hlavac, DPM, MEd, (b. 1944) is a podiatrist, author, consultant, and inventor. Dr. Hlavac is the proprietor of Footguru, LLC, and Hlavac Podiatry, a specialized biomechanics private practice, based in Mill Valley, California. He is a past president of the American Academy of Podiatric Sports Medicine, and a former Clinical Professor of Biomechanics at the California School of Podiatric Medicine. Along with Drs. Richard Schuster and Steven Subotnick, Dr. Hlavac is considered to be a pioneer in the modern use of podiatric clinical biomechanics for the management of foot, knee, hip and back pain and treatment of athletic injuries.

== Inventions ==
The "Footspring" formerly known as the 'Lavac Strap' was patented by Hlavac for relief of plantar fasciitis, heel pain, and to control foot function, as an alternative to sports taping commonly used by athletic trainers.

The 'Biopedal' is a patented adjustable orthotic bicycle pedal for balanced performance on bicycle and rehabilitation equipment.

The 'Hlavac Heel', also marketed under other trade names including 'Sports Wedge' and 'Gait Wedge', is a wedged heel cup designed to reduce pronation stresses caused by ankle and foot imbalances.

== Publications ==
- The Foot Book: Advice for Athletes, World Publications: Mountain View, California, 1977, ISBN 0-89037-119-9
- "Redefining Plantar Fasciitis", Podiatry Today, November, 2001
