= Paul Reese =

American school administrator

Paul Reese (1917 – November 4, 2004) was a United States Marine Corps colonel during World War II, and he later became a high level administrator with the Sacramento City School District. Reese became a local running legend as a top age group competitor, a pioneer in the ultrarunning community, and founding race director of the Clarksburg Country Run, the first long distance road race in Northern California.

== Education and career ==
Reese graduated from Christian Brothers High School in Sacramento in 1935. He attended Sacramento City College and the University of California, Berkeley, earning a master's degree in administration in 1940.

He served in the United States Marine Corps as an intelligence officer during World War II, and saw action on Guam and Okinawa, and was a tactical observation officer in the Korean War, flying 91 missions in torpedo bombers from aircraft carriers.

After his military career, Reese worked in the Sacramento City school system until his retirement in 1982. During this time, he was the race director for many events, including the old Capitol to Capitol 140 mile run, the Sunkist 100, a two-day stage race and the Pepsi 20 Mile Run.

== Competitor, race director ==
Reese was a founding figure of the Buffalo Chips Running Club, and one of the best ever 50-59 age group runners. He set numerous national records in his 40s through his 80s, running in the 2:36 territory for a marathon in his mid-50s, and also a low 13-hour 100 miler in his 50s. He wrote several books chronicling his many cross-state and cross-country runs. In December, 1997, he finished, with Hawaii, running across all 50 states. The running community was greatly impacted far and wide by his death in 2004.

Reese ran in the early Rocklin ultras, the Lake Tahoe 72 Mile Run, London to Brighton, Comrades Marathon in South Africa, and the Western States 100 Miler.

The Clarksburg Country Run (originally the Pepsi 20), which preceded all the Northern California marathons, was a 20 miler for its first 15 or so years, beginning in 1966. The 2005 event, which also has served as the 30 km Pacific Association USATF championship for many years, has been renamed the Paul Reese Memorial Clarksburg Country Run. Paul personally supported the race through its formative years, and he also started the Lake Tahoe 72 Miler (an ultra-marathon around the lake on roads), and the Sunkist 2 day 100 km event.

In 1990, at age 73, he and George Billingsley ran across the United States for a summer 'fun run'. Two years later, he and wife Elaine headed east from their California home on a mission to run across each of the 14 remaining states west of the Mississippi River. Over the next five summers, Reese ran these states and wrote daily in his journal, the basis for his second book, Go East Old Man.

== Quote ==
"Reflecting on 40 years of running and racing, I've come to the realization that the most important consideration about running is not how fast you can run, not how far you can run, but rather, the degree and manner in which running and racing enhance your life. That is the sum and substance of the worth of running. Having said that, I would venture to guess that very few runners either think or dwell on such enhancement. Their energies, their thoughts, are directed to times, PRs (personal records), races, mileage, gear, and the eternal search for the perfect shoe. I plead guilty to having done much of that when I was competing. Maybe the realization and appreciation of enhancement dawn only after a person has suffered the loss of running and racing. While active, we're just too damned obsessed with the inconsequential to recognize how privileged we are, how running and racing enhance our lives. One thing for sure, if you lose running and racing, you had better be able to devise ways to compensate because you will have a huge void to fill when you come to realize how running enhanced your life." Paul Reese, 2004

== Books ==
- 1993, Ten Million Steps: The Incredible Journey of Paul Reese, Who Ran Across America--A Marathon a Day for 124 Days--At Age 73, High Country Books, ISBN 1-56796-014-6
- 1997 Go East Old Man: Adventures of a Runner in His 70s Traveling 22 Western States, edited by Joe Henderson, Keokee Company Publishing, Inc., ISBN 1-879628-15-5
- 2000 The Old Man and the Road: Reflections While Completing a Crossing of All 50 States on Foot at Age 80, with Joe Henderson, Keokee Company Publishing, Inc., ISBN 1-879628-20-1
