= George A. Sheehan =

American physician (1918–1993)

George A. Sheehan (November 5, 1918 – November 1, 1993) was an American physician, senior athlete, and author best known for his writings about the sport of running. His book, "Running & Being: The Total Experience", became a New York Times best seller. He was a track star in college, and later became a cardiologist like his father. He served as a doctor in the United States Navy in the South Pacific during World War II on the destroyer USS Daly (DD-519). He married Mary Jane Fleming and they raised twelve children. He continued to write while struggling with prostate cancer. His last book, Going the Distance, was published shortly after his death.

== Early life ==
Sheehan was born in Brooklyn, the oldest of 14 children. He was a track star at Manhattan College, from which he graduated in 1940, and earned his M.D. degree in 1943 from the Long Island College of Medicine (now known as SUNY Downstate Medical Center). He renewed his interest in running at age 45 while living in Rumson, New Jersey. He began running in his back yard (26 loops to a mile) and then started running along the river road during his lunch break wearing long-johns and a ski mask. Five years later, he ran a 4:47 mile, which was the world's first sub-five-minute time by a 50-year-old.

== Career ==
Sheehan began writing a weekly column in the local newspaper and continued to write the column for 25 years. Many of these years were served as the medical editor for Runner's World magazine. (He had been introduced to Joe Henderson by Hal Higdon during the 1968 Olympics. Henderson later recruited him as medical editor for the magazine.) He continued to write for Runner's World after the magazine was purchased by Rodale Press. He wrote eight books and lectured around the world.

In 1958, Sheehan co-founded Christian Brothers Academy, an all-male school in Lincroft, New Jersey, near his home in Rumson, which grew to become one of New Jersey's premier prep schools.

In 1986, he was diagnosed with prostate cancer. He continued to run until his legs could no longer carry him. During this period he continued to write about his experiences. This time it wasn't about running, it was about dying. Going the Distance was his last book, and was published shortly after his death. He died of prostate cancer at his home in the Ocean Grove section of Neptune Township, New Jersey.

After Sheehan's death, one of his sons, journalist Andrew Sheehan, published Chasing the Hawk: Looking for My Father, Finding Myself (Delacorte Press, 2001) which discusses his experience of Sheehan as a father and family man.

== Books ==
- The Encyclopedia of Athletic Medicine (1972) ISBN 0-890-37015-X
- Dr. Sheehan on Running (1975) ISBN 0-89037-069-9
- Dr. George Sheehan's Medical Advice for Runners (1978) ISBN 0-02-499170-8
- Running & Being: The Total Experience (1978) ISBN 0-446-97090-5
- This Running Life (1980) ISBN 0-671-25608-4
- How to Feel Great Twenty Four Hours a Day (1983) ISBN 0-671-45478-1
- Dr. Sheehan on Fitness (1983) ISBN 0-671-45478-1
- Personal Best: The Foremost Philosopher of Fitness Shares Techniques and Tactics for Success and Self-Liberation (1989) ISBN 0-87857-858-7
- George Sheehan on Running to Win : How to Achieve the Physical, Mental & Spiritual Victories of Running (1992) ISBN 0-87596-145-2
- Dr. George Sheehan on Getting Fit and Feeling Great (1992) ISBN 0-517-08462-7
- Going the Distance: One Man's Journey to the End of His Life (1996) ISBN 0-614-95718-4
- The Essential Sheehan: 30 Years of Running Wisdom from the Legendary George Sheehan (2013) ISBN 1-609-61932-3

== See also ==
- Joe Henderson, Did I win? (A Farewell to George Sheehan) (1994) Wrs Pub ISBN 1-56796-066-9
- Andrew Sheehan, Chasing the Hawk (2001) ISBN 0-385-33564-4
