= Denise Austin =

American fitness instructor, author, and columnist

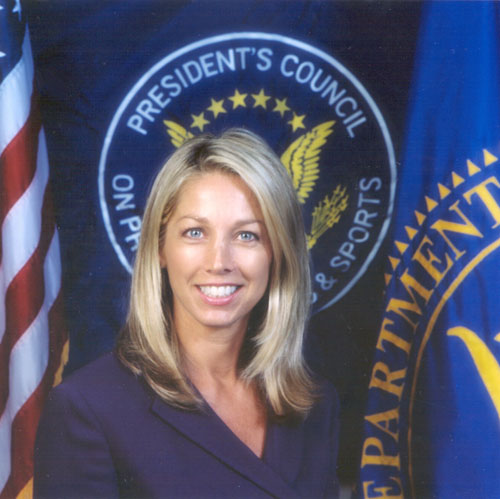
- Austin as a member of the President's Council on Physical Fitness and Sports
- Born: Denise Katnich; February 13, 1957 (age 69); San Pedro, California, U.S.
- Education: California State University, Long Beach
- Occupations: Personal trainer, group fitness instructor, entrepreneur
- Years active: 1980–present
- Political party: Republican
- Spouse: Jeff Austin (m. 1983)
- Children: 2
- Website: deniseaustin.com

Denise Austin (née Katnich; born February 13, 1957) is an American fitness instructor, author, and columnist, and a former member of the President's Council on Physical Fitness and Sports.

== Early life ==
Austin was born in San Pedro, Los Angeles, California. She started gymnastics at the age of 12, which led to an athletic scholarship at the University of Arizona.

== Personal life ==
Denise is married to sports agent, and former tennis player Jeff Austin, brother of US Open champion Tracy Austin. They have been married since April 30, 1983, and have two daughters, Kelly (b. 1990) and Katie (b. 1993). Katie is a fitness instructor like her mother and has her own YouTube channel. As of 2012, the Austins resided in Alexandria, Virginia. In 2018, the Austins moved to Hermosa Beach, California. On September 5th, 2026, Jeff and Denise became grandparents when Katie gave birth to a girl, Lila.

== Fitness career ==
Austin initially attended the University of Arizona on a gymnastics scholarship, reaching the rank of number 9 in the NCAA on balance beam. She later transferred to California State University, Long Beach, graduating with a bachelor's degree in physical education, and a minor in exercise physiology.

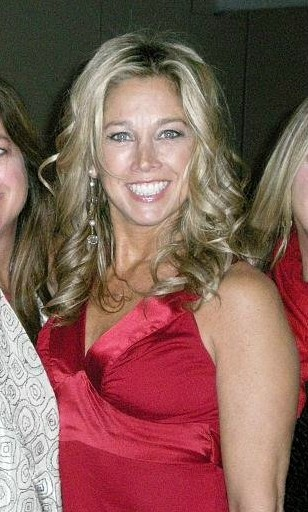
Austin at The Heart Truth Fashion Show, 2008

Since then, she has been teaching classes, producing fitness shows, creating exercise video tapes, and writing books and columns on exercise and staying fit. Examples include Shrink Your Female Fat Zones, Pilates for Every Body, and Eat Carbs, Lose Weight. In 2002, president George W. Bush named Austin as a member of the President's Council on Physical Fitness and Sports, and began her second term in 2006.

Austin promoted the Reebok Freestyle sneaker, which was the first athletic shoe designed for women, making it an instant hit in the gym in the 1980s. "I absolutely loved this time in my career, I was the first spokesperson for the very first aerobic shoe," Austin said in a November 22, 2019 Facebook post.

Austin is known for her emphasis on staying fit naturally, emphasizing that she herself exercises only about 30 minutes a day and does not skip meals. She also prefers the use of sugar and butter over artificial sweeteners and margarine, though she does emphasize portion control, proper nutrient balance, and exercise. Austin supports a balanced program of exercise and proper diet, and encourages people to stay away from fad diets or "crazy claims" for quick fixes. Her exercise programs often integrate a variety of methods including yoga, pilates, cross training, and aerobic exercise.

Austin had a long-running exercise television program Getting Fit with Denise Austin on ESPN2, reruns of which can currently be seen on ESPN Classic and Altitude Sports and Entertainment. The show moved to weekday mornings on Lifetime Television, where it was renamed Fit and Lite and Denise Austin's Daily Workout. Austin produced these shows each fall, spending four months on location in resorts in the Caribbean and Arizona. Lifetime cancelled the shows in April 2008. Austin said she was developing a new TV show later that year. It was in the planning stages for 2010.

According to The Washington Post, Austin was headed back to Lifetime in January 2011. She is on the morning program The Balancing Act. Austin before had said on her website that she was getting a new show ready for debut in the fall of 2008, though the show did not debut. When she was interviewed by Erin Whitehead in 2009, it was reported her new show would be back on in the fall of that year. In April 2007, a Washington, D.C. alternative weekly newspaper called the Washington City Paper featured an article on Austin under their "Cheap Seats" column, where she was questioned about how some of her exercise shows on YouTube are like pornography to some people. Austin said that she was totally unaware. She also reportedly said, with a giggle, that she was worried about it.

Austin also made a cameo in the beginning of the movie Step Brothers (2008). She was sent a copy of the script and approved the scene.

== List of workout videos ==
Year released	DVD title	Fitness focus
2014	Yoga Booty Lift	
2013	Burn Fat Fast Latin Dance	
2013	Burn Fat Walk	Cardio
2012	Shrink Belly Fat	Core
2012	Burn Fat Fast Latin Dance	Cardio
2012	Fit in a Flash	Total body sculpt and cardio
2012	Shrink Your 5 Fat Zones	Total body cardio
2011	Shape Up and Shed Pounds	Cardio
2011	Sculpt and Burn Body Blitz	Total body sculpt and cardio
2010	Quick Burn Cardio	Cardio
2010	Shrink Your Fat Zones Pilates	Pilates—total body sculpt
2010	Hot Body Yoga	Yoga
2009	3 Week Boot Camp	Total body sculpt and cardio
2009	Body Makeover Mix	Total body sculpt
2009	Best Bun & Leg Shapers	Lower body sculpt
2008	Denise's Daily Dozen	Total body sculpt and cardio
2008	Best Belly Fat-Blasters	Core and cardio
2008	Body Burn With Dance & Pilates	Total body sculpt and cardio
2007	Hit the Spot	Total body sculpt
2007	Yoga Body Burn	Yoga - sculpt
2006	Boot Camp - Total Body Blast	Total body sculpt and cardio
2006	Fat Burning Dance Mix	Dance - cardio
2006	Fat Burning Dance Mix	Dance - cardio
2006	Hit the Spot - Core Complete	Core
2005	Burn Fat Fast - Cardio Dance & Sculpt	Dance - total body sculpt and cardio
2005	Blast Away the Pounds - Indoor Walk	Walk - cardio
2005	Blast Away 10 Lbs	Cardio
2005	Hit the Spot - Pilates	Pilates - total body sculpt
2005	Get Fit Fast All in One Trainer	Total body sculpt and cardio
2005	Bounce Back After Baby Workout	Total body sculpt and cardio
2004	Personal Training System	Total body sculpt and cardio
2003	Shrink Your Female Fat Zones	Total body sculpt
2003	Fast-Blasting Yoga	Yoga
2003	Power Zone: Mind, Body, Soul	Yoga
2002	Pilates for Every Body	Pilates - total body sculpt
2002	Yoga Buns: The Complete Workout to Strengthen, Lengthen and Tone Your Body	Yoga - lower body
2002	Shape Stretch and Tone	
2001	Ultimate Fat Burner	Total body sculpt and cardio
2000	Mat Workout Based on the Work of J.H. Pilates	Pilates - core
1999	Hit the Spot: Tone & Tighten - Abs, Buns & Thighs	Core and lower body sculpt
1999	Hit the Spot: Totally Toned Trio	
1999	30 Minute Low Impact Fat Burning Workout	Cardio
1999	Stretch & Flex	
1998	Hips Thighs & Buttocks	Lower sculpt
1998	The Complete Workout	Total body
1997	Xtralite: Beginner's Aerobics	Cardio
1997	Xtralite: Beginner's Tone Up!	
1997	Hit the Spot Gold: Totally Firm	Total body
1996	Hit the Spot: Fat Burning Blast	Cardio
1996	Hit the Spot: Rock Hard Abs	Core
1995	Hit the Spot: Abs	Core
1995	Hit the Spot: Thighs	Lower body
1995	Hit the Spot: Buns	Lower body
1992	Swingin' to the Big Bands	Cardio
1991	Step Workout featuring the Reebok Step	Cardio
1988	Non-Aerobic Trim & Tone Workout	
