= Hal Higdon =

American writer and runner (born 1931)

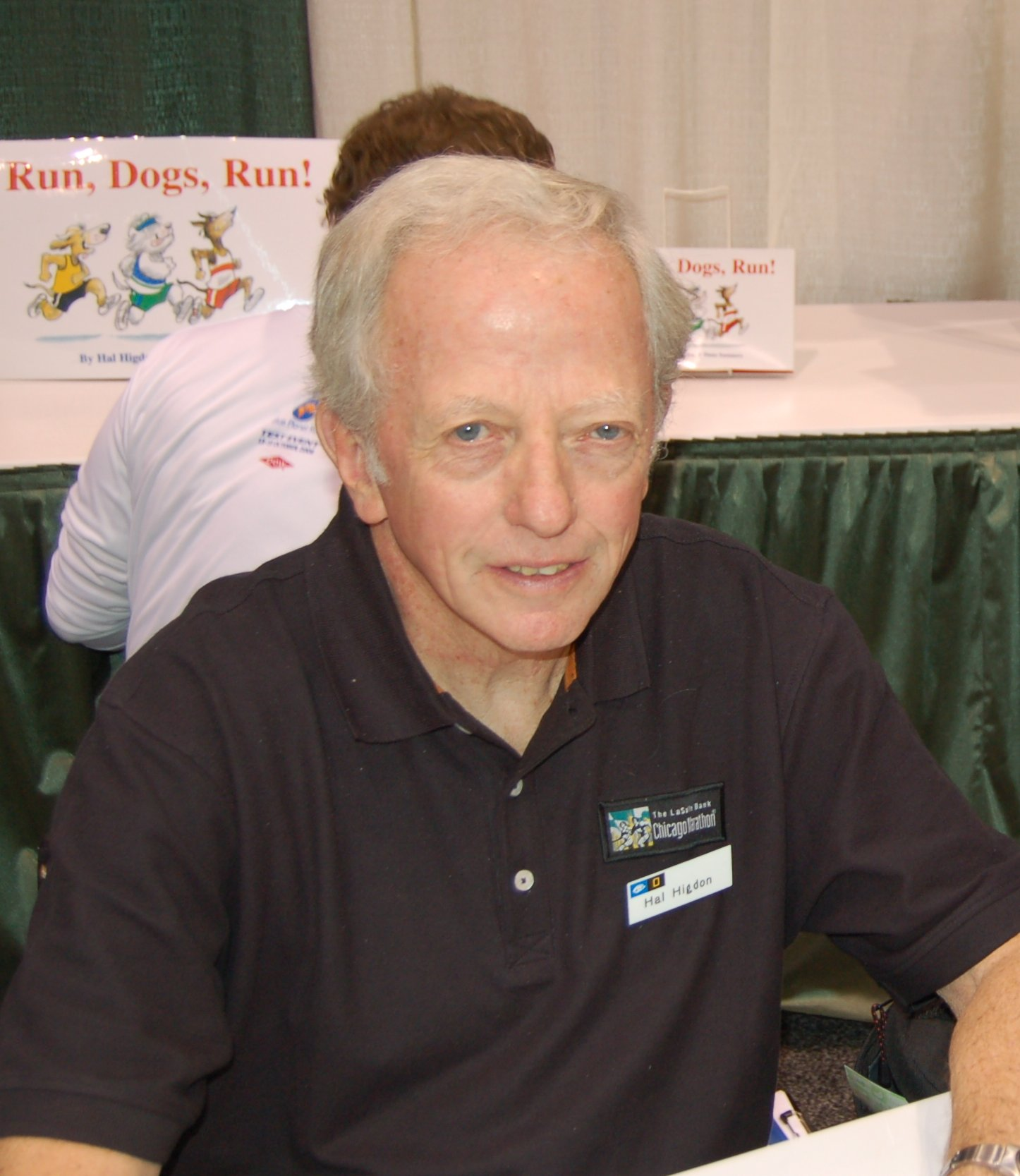
- Born: June 17, 1931 (age 95)
- Occupations: Writer, runner
- Writing career
- Genres: History, Sports

Hal Higdon (born June 17, 1931) is an American writer and runner known for his training plans. He is the author of 34 books, including the best-selling Marathon: The Ultimate Training Guide. He has worked as a freelance writer since 1959, and has written a variety of subjects including a children's book that was made into an animated feature. He has contributed to Runner's World magazine longer than any other writer. He ran eight times in the United States Olympic Trials and won four World Masters Championships. He is one of the founders of the Road Runners Club of America (RRCA).

== Life and work ==
Higdon grew up in Chicago, Illinois. In 1947, he participated in track at the University of Chicago's Laboratory School, placing fourth as a sophomore with a 5:04.7 mile. Due to switching schools, he did not run in his junior year, but he started again in his senior year and has been running ever since.

While attending Carleton College in Northfield, Minnesota, Higdon won the Midwest Conference titles in the mile, half-mile and cross-country. This is also where he began to research training plans. His best mile time (post-college time) was 4:13.6, and he had notable success at running long-distance races. He participated in the US Olympic Trials in 1952, running in the 10,000 meters race. Subsequently, he entered the trials seven times over the years, with his best performance being fifth in the 3,000 meter steeplechase in 1960.

In 1959, Higdon's first marathon was the Boston Marathon, where he dropped out at 22 miles. Five years later, he led through 19 miles before being passed by Aurele Vandendriessche, who won the race. Higdon took fifth with a personal best of 2:21:55. As of 2006, he has completed 111 marathons and has won four overall victories and numerous age-group firsts. In his article "Demolition Derby" published in the Michigan Runner, Higdon said, "We take our victories where and when we can get them."

Higdon has worked as a freelance writer since 1959, covering various subjects including politics for the New York Times Magazine, science for National Geographic, business for Playboy and aviation for Air & Space Smithsonian. In 1963, Sports Illustrated published his article "On the Run from Dogs and People", which was expanded into a book in 1971.

=== Runner's World ===
In 1966, Higdon received a letter from a high school student in Overland Park, Kansas. The student, Bob Anderson, had started a magazine titled Distance Running News and he was seeking Higdon's help. Higdon offered an article that he had written for Sports Illustrated to be published as a reprint in the second issue of Distance Running News; the publication that eventually became Runner's World magazine. In 1968, during the Olympics, Higdon introduced George Sheehan to Joe Henderson who later recruited him as medical editor for the magazine.

Several articles written by Higdon were included in a 2006 commemorative book which was edited by Richard Benyo and was released in honor of the Boston Marathon.

=== Other accomplishments ===
Higdon's training plans have been used by a range of runners and adapted for different apps. His novice marathon program is said to have been used by more than one million runners.

Higdon's children's book The Horse That Played Center Field was made into an animated feature by ABC-TV.

In 1980, Higdon received a Journalism Award as one of the founders of the Road Runners Club of America (RRCA) and in 1981 was named to the RRCA Hall of Fame. In 1995, Higdon was presented with the Harold Hirsch Award by the North American Ski Journalists Association for his work in the South Bend Tribune, and in 2003 he was awarded a Career Achievement Award by the American Society of Journalist and Authors.

In 1975, Higdon's book Leopold and Loeb, The Crime of the Century was published. The book was reprinted in 1999 on the crime's 75th anniversary. The Oakland Tribune wrote: "Higdon's book outdoes anything Alfred Hitchcock ever filmed. It is a masterpiece of suspense."

Higdon still holds the current M40 American record for the steeplechase, set in 1975.

Higdon received the 2012 Distinguished Alumnus Award from the University of Chicago Laboratory Schools.

Higdon currently lives with his wife, Rose, in Long Beach, Indiana. Rose has co-authored a book with him about her Italo-Albanian heritage: "Falconara: A Family Odyssey." They have three children and nine grandchildren.

== Books ==
- The Union vs Dr. Mudd (1964), Follett, ASIN B0006BM038
- Inside Pro Football (1968), Grosset & Dunlap, ASIN B000GQHDL2
- The Horse that Played Center Field, Holt Rinehart and Winston; 1st edition (1969), ASIN B000GHTCP6
- The Business Healers (1969), ASIN B0006DEMPA
- Champions of the Tennis Court (1971), Prentice-Hall, ISBN 0-13-125419-7
- The Electronic Olympics (1971), Henry Holt & Company, Inc., ISBN 0-03-080224-5
- Finding the Groove (1973), Putman, ISBN 0-399-11144-1
- The Last Series (1974), Dutton, ISBN 0-525-33395-9
- The Crime of the Century: The Leopold and Loeb Case (1975), Putnam, ISBN 0399114912
- Hitting, Pitching and Fielding (1978) Putnam Pub Group Library, ISBN 0-399-61117-7
- The Marathoners (1980) G.P. Putnam's Sons, ISBN 0-399-20695-7
- Beginners Running Guide (1987) Anderson World; Revised edition, ISBN 0-89037-130-X
- Run Fast: How to Train for a 5-K or 10-K Race (1992), Rodale ISBN 0-87596-103-7
- Marathon: The Ultimate Guide (1993), Rodale, ISBN 0-87596-159-2
- Johnny Rutherford (1994), X-S Books, Inc., ISBN 0-399-61136-3
- On the Run from Dogs and People (1995), Roadrunner Pr; 3RD edition, ISBN 0-9636346-2-3
- Hal Higdon's How to Train: The Best Programs, Workouts, And Schedules For Runners Of All Ages (1997) Rodale, ISBN 0-87596-352-8
- Marathon: The Ultimate Training Guide (1999), ISBN 1-57954-171-2
- Run Fast: How to Beat Your Best Time--- Every Time (2000) Rodale Books; Rev Ed edition, ISBN 1-57954-269-7
- Henderson, Joe, and Hal Higdon, Running 101 (2000), Human Kinetics Publishers; 1 edition (August 2000) ISBN 0-7360-3056-5
- Marathon A-Z, (2002), The Lyons Press, ISBN 1-58574-453-0
- Masters Running: A Guide To Running And Staying Fit After 40 (2005) Rodale, ISBN 1-59486-021-1
- Marathon (2006) Rodale International Ltd, ISBN 1-4050-8799-4
- Hal Higdon's Half Marathon Training (2016) Human Kinetics, ISBN 978-1492517245
