= Runner's World =

Global monthly magazine about running

- Serena Burla on cover of the July 2011 issue
- Runner-in-Chief: Jeff Dengate
- Former editors: David Willey; Bob Anderson
- Categories: Health; Running; Marathons
- Frequency: Quarterly
- Publisher: Hearst
- Total circulation: 4,000,000 (1,600,000 print and 2,400,000 digital) (November 2024)
- Founded: 1966
- First issue: January 1966
- Country: United States
- Based in: Easton, Pennsylvania, U.S.
- Language: English
- Website: www.runnersworld.com
- ISSN: 0897-1706

Runner's World is a global magazine and website for runners of all abilities. It has additionally developed experiential formats, including a digital membership program, called Runner's World+. It is published by Hearst in Easton, Pennsylvania and was formerly published by Rodale, Inc. Outside the United States, the magazine is published in France, Germany, Italy, Norway, South Africa, Spain, Sweden, the United Kingdom, and the Netherlands.

== History ==
Runner's World was originally launched in 1966 by Bob Anderson as a mimeographed newsletter Distance Running News, and Anderson published it by himself for several years from his home in Manhattan, Kansas. Runner and writer Hal Higdon had been writing for the magazine since its second edition.

In 1969, Anderson changed the name of the magazine to Runner's World. He brought on Joe Henderson as chief editor and moved the editorial offices, now named World Publications, to Mountain View, California. Runner's World thrived during the 1970s "running boom", even in the face of competition from the New York City–based magazine, The Runner.

In May of 1970 Doris Brown became the first woman to be on the cover page of the magazine, marking an important milestone for the magazine. Additionally, in 1973 the magazine began to be printed in color. Later on, October of 1987 Runner's World implemented Miles, the little running man as the apostrophe in the Runner's World title. The most recent logo change happened in October 2014, which still remains the current logo in 2025.

=== Purchase by Rodale Press ===
In the early 1980s, Bob Anderson sold a good portion of his publications, including Runner's World. Some of Anderson's books went out of print while others were distributed by Macmillan Publishing. Robert Rodale of Rodale, Inc., purchased Runner's World in 1985 and the editorial offices moved to Rodale's base in Emmaus, Pennsylvania. Joe Henderson did not move to Emmaus, and stepped down as editor, though he remained associated with the magazine until 2003. Random House bought the running log, which was published under the Runner's World name for decades after the sale.

In 1986, Rodale bought The Runner, and merged the two magazines, keeping the Runner's World name and some writers, including Amby Burfoot who became the editor (a post he held until 2003).

Runner's World remained strong through the so-called "second running boom" in the late 1990s. In 2004, the magazine had a full redesign. Since then, the magazine has won several awards including being ranked No. 1 on Adweek's Hot List, No. 6 on Advertising Age's "A-List"; been recognized for having the "Creative Team of the Year", and most notably has been nominated three times for National Magazine Awards.

In February 2007, Rodale acquired Running Times magazine and website and combined both brands in 2015.

Hearst acquired Rodale in 2018. Runner's World offices were moved from Emmaus, Pennsylvania, to Easton, Pennsylvania. That new office included a testing lab, called the "Test Zone," which also allow visitors to see the Runner's World and Bicycling product tests.

Since then, Runner's World has covered all of the major races such as the Boston, New York City, and Chicago Marathons. They have held interviews with notable celebrities such Alicia Keys, Will Ferrell, and Kevin Hart. Will Ferrell even made a cover appearance of March 2002 issue of the magazine.

== Awards ==
In 2019, the American Society of Journalist and Authors awarded writer Michelle Hamilton's article "Saudi Women Will Run the Kingdom" with the awards for outstanding fitness & sports article. The year following, Christine Yu was awarded by the same organization for her Runner's World article "Women Deserve to Run Without Fear."

In 2021, Mitchell S. Jackson was awarded the Pulitzer Prize for Feature Writing for his Runner's World article Twelve Minutes and a Life, "a deeply affecting account of the murder of Ahmaud Arbery that combined vivid writing, thorough reporting and personal experience to shed light on systemic racism in America." The article also won a National Magazine Award and a Jenkins Medal for Excellence in Sportswriting, award by Moody College of Communication, that year.

In 2022, Wufei Yu & Will Ford's article from the November/December 2021 Issue, "172 Runners Started This Ultramarathon. 21 Of Them Never Came Back," was awarded the Excellence in Sports Reporting award by the Asian American Journalists Association, as well as the award for of Writing Best Colour Piece by Association Internationale de la Presse Sportive's (the International Sports Press Association) sports media awards.

== International circulation ==
Since the early 1990s, Runner's World has expanded outside the United States, currently with 18 international editions. The first in September 1993 was a United Kingdom edition wholly owned by NatMag Rodale, a joint venture between Rodale, Inc. and The Hearst Corporation in the UK. As of December 2024, there 10 international editions of Runner's World, aside from the flagship edition in the U.S.: Australia/New Zealand, France, Germany, Italy, Netherlands, Norway, Poland, South Africa, Spain, Sweden and the UK. All are published either as joint ventures or through licensing arrangements with publishers in those countries. Editors in each country have access to editorial content from the U.S. edition, but also publish their own original content with local flavor. Currently today, there are over 781,000 thousand users across the platform, marking the significance the magazine has in the running industry.

== Runners-in-Chief ==
Editors-in-chief at Runner's World are called Runners-in-Chief and, to date, have included:

- Bob Anderson (1966 - 1985)
- Joe Henderson (1970 - 1977)
- Robert Rodale (1985 - 1987)
- Ambrose "Amby" Burfoot (1985 - 2003)
- David Willey (2003 - 2017)
- Betty Wong Ortiz (2017 - 2018)
- Jeff Dengate (2018–Present)

== Book publishing ==
- Dagny Scott Barrios, Runner's World Complete Book of Women’s Running, 2007, ISBN 9781594868221, 9781594867583, 1594868220, 1594867585
- Amby Burfoot, Runner's world complete book of running, 2010, ISBN 9781605295794, 1605295795
- The great Grete Waitz, 2011, ISBN 9781609614652, 1609614658
- Jennifer Van Allen, Runner’s World Big Book of Marathon and Half-Marathon Training, 2012, ISBN 9781609619152, 9781609616847, 1609619153, 1609616847
- Amby Burfoot, Runner's World training journal, 2012, ISBN 9781609618544, 1609618548
- Scot Douglas, The runner's world complete guide to minimalism and barefoot running, 2013, ISBN 9781609612221, 1609612221
- Jennifer Van Allen, Runner’s World Big Book of Running for Beginners, 2014, ISBN 9781609615376, 9781623364755, 9781635653304, 1609615379
- Bart Yasso and Erin Strout, Runner's World race everything, 2017, ISBN 9781623369828, 1623369827
- Meghan Kita, How to make yourself poop and 999 other tips all runners should know, 2018, ISBN 9781635651836, 9781635651843, 1635651832, 1635651840
- Bill Pierce, Scott Murr, Runner’s World Run Less Faster, 2021, ISBN 9780593232231, 0593232232

Cookbooks

- Joanna Sayago Golub, The Runner's world cookbook, 2013, ISBN 9781623361686, 9781623361235
- Heather Mayer Irvine, The Runner's World vegetarian cookbook, 2018, ISBN 9781635650617, 1635650615

== See also ==
- Bob Anderson
- John Bingham
- Browning Ross
