= 1978 Avon International Marathon =

Women-only marathon

- Location: Atlanta, United States
- Date: March 19, 1978

Champions
- Women: Marty Cooksey (2:46:16)

The 1978 Avon International Marathon was the first edition of the Avon International Marathon, and took place on March 19, 1978, in Atlanta, Georgia, in the United States. It was a women-only marathon which had been put on to showcase female talent over the distance (26 miles 385 yards (42.195 km)), which at the time did not feature for women at the Olympic Games. The race was sponsored by Avon Products, who had covered the traveling expenses for some of the world's best female marathon runners to take part. The race was won by Marty Cooksey of the United States, a relative unknown, in a time of 2:46:16.

== Background ==
=== Inception of the Avon International Marathon ===
Although the men's marathon had featured at the Olympic Games since its modern inception in 1896, the women's marathon was not an established event at an international level in the 1970s. Some experts claimed that running the marathon distance, 26 miles 385 yards (42.195 km), was dangerous for women's health. Women began unofficially running in the Boston Marathon in the late 1960s, and one of the pioneers of the sport was Kathrine Switzer, who ran Boston in 1967. She spent the subsequent years campaigning for the recognition of the women's marathon. In 1972, Boston officially allowed women to participate, and two years later the United States held a women's national marathon championship for the first time. As it gained prominence through the early 1970s, there were calls for it to be added to the Olympics, but there remained significant opposition, and the longest distance included for women at the 1976 Summer Olympics in Montreal was 1,500 meters.

Switzer established the Avon International Marathon in 1978, a women only marathon, aiming to both create a pseudo women's marathon world championship, and highlight the growth in women's marathon running. The event was sponsored by Avon Products, and licensed by the Atlanta Track Club.

=== Course ===
The race took place in the northern suburbs of Atlanta on a two-lap course which started from the Avon Products building on Cotillion Drive, Chamblee. The route, which was described as hilly and not conducive to record setting, headed north up North Peachtree Road and Tilly Milly Road to Mount Vernon Place before turning west along Mount Vernon Road, reaching Perimeter Center. The course then weaved south and north, along Peachtree–Dunwood Road, Ashford–Dunwood Road and Chamblee–Dunwoody road before returning to the start and finish area.

=== Runners ===
Switzer had initially hoped for a field of around 500 runners, but it eventually attracted around 200 entrants. In order to ensure a high-quality field Avon, the race sponsor, covered the traveling expenses of the top twenty female marathon runners from around the world. The world record prior to the race was 2:34:47, held by Christa Vahlensieck of West Germany, who it had been hoped would take part, but she was committed to take part in the 1978 IAAF World Cross Country Championships. The second-fastest woman, Chantal Langlacé also missed the race, as she had an Achilles tendon injury. Nonetheless, fourteen of the fastest twenty-four female marathon runners took part, four of whom had personal bests quicker than 2 hours 40 minutes – Kim Merritt, Manuela Angenvoorth, Jacqueline Hansen and Miki Gorman.

== Race summary ==
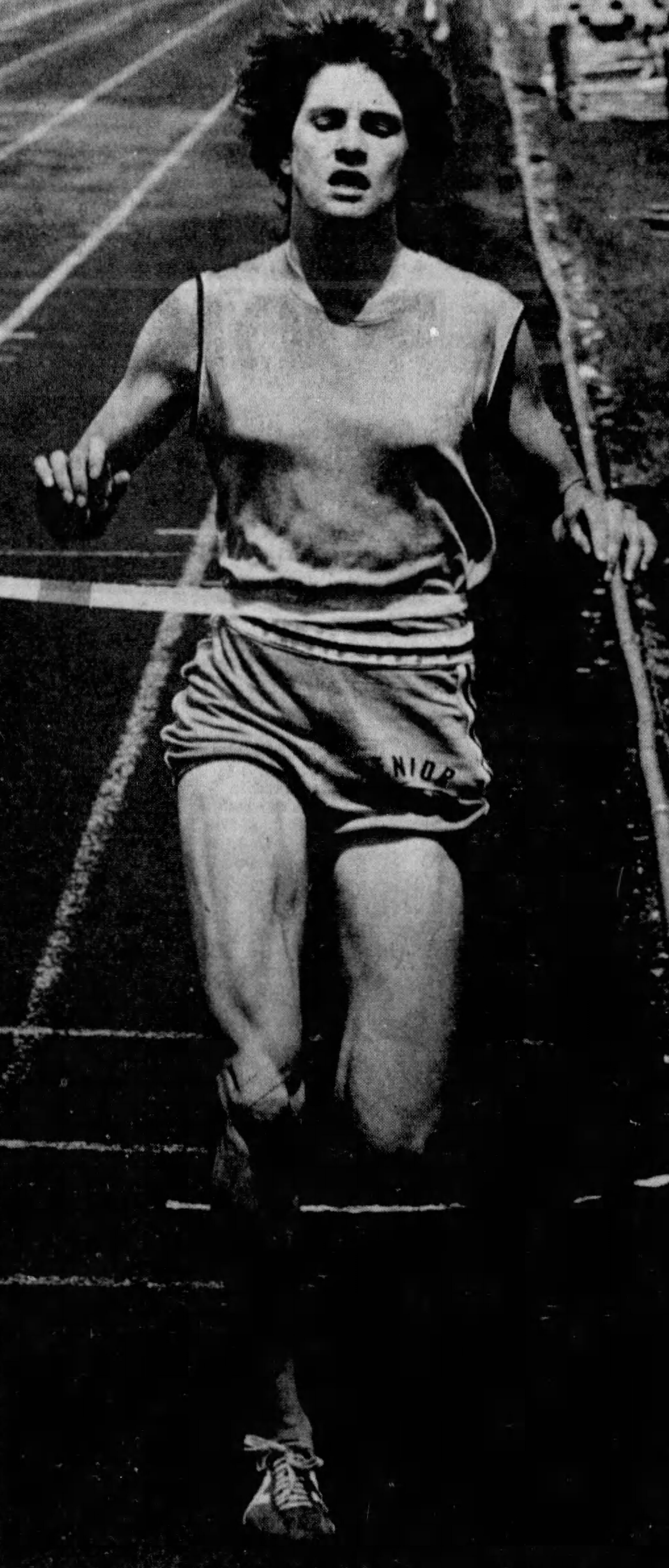
Julie Brown (pictured in 1973) led much of the race, but collapsed before the finish.

The race began at 1:00 pm (EST). A field of 186 runners started the race, which took place in warm and dry conditions, around 75 °F (24 °C), possibly peaking to 90 °F (32 °C). A group of five runners broke away near the beginning of the race; Kim Merritt, Leal-Ann Reinhart, Sarolta Monspart, Manuela Angenvoorth and Julie Brown. Merritt was forced to drop out roughly quarter of the way through the race due to an inflamed Achilles tendon. At the halfway stage, Brown, who was described by Sports Illustrated's Kenny Moore as "the most controlled of the leaders", took the lead and opened up a gap from the pack.

After 15 miles (24 km) Marty Cooksey, who had run a more conservative first half, moved into second place, around 200 yards (180 m) behind Brown, with Monspart and Angenvoorth behind her. Cooksey gradually closed the gap to Brown over the next 8 miles (13 km) and passed her around 3 miles (4.8 km) from the end. Cooksey held on to win the race in 2:46:16, a personal best by over seven minutes. Brown collapsed before the end and had to receive medical attention, leaving Monspart and Angenvoorth to battle for second place; the pair finished just over five minutes behind Cooksey, the former taking second place by thirteen seconds. Cooksey was a surprise winner; at the finish line, one of the race officials said "I don't know anything about her."

Roads were not closed for the race, and the traffic was heavy in places. Brown was forced off the road at least once because of the amount of traffic, despite attempts by the police on motorcycles to clear the traffic ahead of the runners. The Atlanta Constitution said that "Cars were bumper-to-bumper for miles around the Dunwoody area." This, along with the hilly nature of the course, was provided as part of the reason that the finishing times did not get close the world record.

== Results ==
Top ten
Rank	Name	Nationality	Time
1st place, gold medalist(s)	Marty Cooksey	United States	2:46:16
2nd place, silver medalist(s)	Sarolta Monspart	Hungary	2:51:40
3rd place, bronze medalist(s)	Manuela Angenvoorth	West Germany	2:51:53
4	Cindy Dalrymple	United States	2:52:10
5	Gayle Barron	United States	2:53:05
6	Lauri Pedrinali	United States	2:53:11
7	Gillian File	New Zealand	2:56:07
8	Deborah Anderson	United States	2:56:18
9	Marilyn Bevans	United States	2:58:26
10	Liane Winter	West Germany	2:59:42

== Bibliography ==
- Benyo, Richard; Henderson, Joe (2002). "Avon Calling". Running Encyclopedia. Champaign, Illinois: Human Kinetics. ISBN 0-7360-3734-9.
- Lovett, Charles (1997). Olympic Marathon: A Centennial History of the Games' Most Storied Race. Westport, Connecticut: Praeger. ISBN 978-0-2759-5771-1.
