= 1981 in marathon running =

This page lists the World Best Year Performances in the year 1981 in the Marathon for both men and women. Australia's Robert de Castella broke the world record on December 6, 1981, at the Fukuoka Marathon, clocking a total time of 2:08:18. In the men's competition there were two editions of the Tokyo International Marathon run in the same year; the first one was held on February 8, 1981, and the second one on March 1, 1981.

== Men ==
=== Records ===
Standing records prior to the 1981 season in track and field
| World Record | Derek Clayton (AUS) | 2:08:33.6 | May 30, 1969 | Antwerp, Belgium |
Broken records during the 1981 season in track and field
| World Record | Robert de Castella (AUS) | 2:08:18 | December 6, 1981 | Fukuoka, Japan |

=== 1981 World Year Ranking ===
| Rank | Time | Athlete | Pos | Venue | Date | Note |
|---|---|---|---|---|---|---|
| 1 | 2:08:18 | Robert de Castella (AUS) | 1 | Fukuoka, Japan | 06-12-1981 | Personal Best |
| 2 | 2:09:26 | Toshihiko Seko (JPN) | 1 | Boston, United States | 20-04-1981 | |
| 3 | 2:09:28 | John Graham (SCO) | 1 | Rotterdam, Netherlands | 23-05-1981 | Personal Best |
| 4 | 2:09:37 | Dick Beardsley (USA) | 1 | Duluth, United States | 20-06-1981 | |
| 5 | 2:09:37 | Kunimitsu Itō (JPN) | 2 | Fukuoka, Japan | 06-12-1981 | |
| 6 | 2:10:19 | Shigeru So (JPN) | 3 | Fukuoka, Japan | 06-12-1981 | |
| 7 | 2:10:26 | Craig Virgin (USA) | 2 | Boston, United States | 20-04-1981 | Personal Best |
| 8 | 2:10:34 | Bill Rodgers (USA) | 3 | Boston, United States | 20-04-1981 | |
| 9 | 2:11:00 | Rodolfo Gómez (MEX) | 1 | Tokyo, Japan | 01-03-1981 | |
| 10 | 2:11:11 | Kebede Balcha (ETH) | 1 | Montréal, Canada | 13-09-1981 | |
| 11 | 2:11:19 | Gianni Poli (ITA) | 4 | Fukuoka, Japan | 06-12-1981 | |
| 12 | 2:11:29 | Takeshi So (JPN) | 5 | Fukuoka, Japan | 06-12-1981 | |
| 13 | 2:11:32 | Garry Bjorklund (USA) | 2 | Duluth, United States | 20-06-1981 | |
| 14 | 2:11:33 | John Lodwick (USA) | 4 | Boston, United States | 20-04-1981 | |
| 15 | 2:11:35 | Malcolm East (ENG) | 5 | Boston, United States | 20-04-1981 | Personal Best |
| 16 | 2:11:44 | David Cannon (ENG) | 1 | Paris, France | 24-05-1981 | |
| 16 | 2:11:44 | Ron Tabb (USA) | 1 | Paris, France | 24-05-1981 | |
| 18 | 2:11:48 | Inge Simonsen (NOR) | 1 | London, United Kingdom | 29-03-1981 | Personal Best |
| 19 | 2:11:53 | Jukka Toivola (FIN) | 6 | Boston, United States | 20-04-1981 | |
| 20 | 2:11:53 | Steve Kenyon (ENG) | 1 | Manchester, United Kingdom | 18-10-1981 | |
| 21 | 2:12:02 | Dennis Rinde (USA) | 7 | Boston, United States | 20-04-1981 | Personal Best |
| 22 | 2:12:04 | Hideki Kita (JPN) | 1 | Tokyo, Japan | 08-02-1981 | |
| 23 | 2:12:07 | Tommy Persson (SWE) | 2 | Tokyo, Japan | 01-03-1981 | |
| 24 | 2:12:11 | Anelio Bocci (ITA) | 2 | Tokyo, Japan | 08-02-1981 | Personal Best |
| 24 | 2:12:11 | Kevin Ryan (NZL) | 1 | Wiri, New Zealand | 22-11-1981 | |
| 26 | 2:12:12 | Benji Durden (USA) | 1 | Eugene, United States | 13-09-1981 | |
| 27 | 2:12:14 | Dereje Nedi (ETH) | 3 | Tokyo, Japan | 08-02-1981 | |
| 28 | 2:12:17 | Rik Schoofs (BEL) | 4 | Tokyo, Japan | 08-02-1981 | Personal Best |
| 29 | 2:12:22 | Domingo Tibaduiza (COL) | 2 | Montréal, Canada | 13-09-1981 | |
| 30 | 2:12:24 | David Chettle (AUS) | 8 | Boston, United States | 20-04-1981 | |
| 31 | 2:12:25 | Vladimir Kotov (URS) | 8 | Fukuoka, Japan | 06-12-1981 | |
| 32 | 2:12:31 | Satymkul Dzhumanazarov (URS) | 5 | Tokyo, Japan | 08-02-1981 | Personal Best |
| 32 | 2:12:31 | Randy Thomas (USA) | 3 | Tokyo, Japan | 01-03-1981 | |
| 34 | 2:12:32 | Kyle Heffner (USA) | 9 | Boston, United States | 20-04-1981 | |
| 35 | 2:12:34 | Gordon Minty (USA) | 2 | Eugene, United States | 13-09-1981 | Personal Best |
| 36 | 2:12:41 | Pete Pfitzinger (USA) | 3 | Eugene, United States | 13-09-1981 | |
| 37 | 2:12:53 | Trevor Wright (ENG) | 3 | London, United Kingdom | 29-03-1981 | |
| 38 | 2:12:55 | Víctor Manuel Mora (COL) | 10 | Boston, United States | 20-04-1981 | Personal Best |
| 39 | 2:12:57 | Bernard Rose (RSA) | 1 | Durban, South Africa | 02-08-1981 | |
| 40 | 2:13:02 | John Halberstadt (RSA) | 4 | Eugene, United States | 13-09-1981 | |
| 41 | 2:13:05 | Michael Layman (USA) | 5 | Eugene, United States | 13-09-1981 | |
| 42 | 2:13:06 | Hugh Jones (ENG) | 1 | Oslo, Norway | 12-07-1981 | |
| 43 | 2:13:08 | Greg Meyer (USA) | 11 | Boston, United States | 20-04-1981 | |
| 44 | 2:13:14 | Tom Fleming (USA) | 1 | Los Angeles, United States | 29-03-1981 | |
| 45 | 2:13:15 | Jouni Kortelainen (FIN) | 12 | Boston, United States | 20-04-1981 | |
| 46 | 2:13:15 | Robert Wallace (AUS) | 3 | Duluth, United States | 20-06-1981 | Personal Best |
| 47 | 2:13:16 | Norman Wilson (GBR) | 13 | Boston, United States | 20-04-1981 | Personal Best |
| 48 | 2:13:20 | Kjell-Erik Ståhl (SWE) | 1 | Frankfurt, West Germany | 17-05-1981 | |
| 49 | 2:13:21 | Steve Ortiz (USA) | 6 | Eugene, United States | 13-09-1981 | Personal Best |
| 50 | 2:13:22 | Mineteru Sakamoto (JPN) | 5 | Tokyo, Japan | 01-03-1981 | Personal Best |

== Women ==
=== Records ===
Standing records prior to the 1981 season in track and field
| World Record | Christa Vahlensieck (FRG) | 2:34:47.5 | September 10, 1977 | Berlin, West Germany |

=== 1981 World Year Ranking ===
| Rank | Time | Athlete | Pos | Venue | Date | Note |
|---|---|---|---|---|---|---|
| 1 | 2:26:47 | Allison Roe (NZL) | 1 | Boston, United States | 20-04-1981 | |
| 2 | 2:27:52 | Patti Catalano (USA) | 2 | Boston, United States | 20-04-1981 | |
| 3 | 2:29:35.5 | Lorraine Moller (NZL) | 1 | Duluth, United States | 20-06-1981 | |
| 4 | 2:29:57 | Joyce Smith (ENG) | 1 | London, United Kingdom | 29-03-1981 | |
| 5 | 2:30:17 | Joan Samuelson (USA) | 3 | Boston, United States | 20-04-1981 | |
| 6 | 2:30:55 | Julie Shea (USA) | 4 | Boston, United States | 20-04-1981 | |
| 7 | 2:31:27 | Jacqueline Gareau (CAN) | 5 | Boston, United States | 20-04-1981 | |
| 8 | 2:33:03 | Sissel Grottenberg (NOR) | 6 | Boston, United States | 20-04-1981 | |
| 9 | 2:33:13 | Charlotte Teske (FRG) | 1 | Orsoy, West Germany | 25-04-1981 | |
| 10 | 2:33:32.8 | Linda Staudt (CAN) | 1 | Montréal, Canada | 13-09-1981 | |
| 11 | 2:34:49 | Nancy Conz (USA) | 7 | Boston, United States | 20-04-1981 | |
| 12 | 2:35:19 | Laurie Binder (USA) | 2 | Eugene, United States | 13-09-1981 | |
| 13 | 2:35:24 | Glenys Quick (NZL) | 2 | Dallas, United States | 05-12-1981 | |
| 14 | 2:35:37 | Christa Vahlensieck (FRG) | 2 | Orsoy, West Germany | 25-04-1981 | |
| 15 | 2:35:57 | Laura deWald (USA) | 8 | Boston, United States | 20-04-1981 | |
| 16 | 2:36:46.8 | Janis Klecker (USA) | 2 | Duluth, United States | 20-06-1981 | |
| 17 | 2:36:55 | Kiki Sweigart (USA) | 9 | Boston, United States | 20-04-1981 | |
| 18 | 2:36:59 | Carey May (IRL) | 1 | Scottsdale, United States | 05-12-1981 | |
| 19 | 2:37:12 | Ngaire Drake (NZL) | 2 | London, United Kingdom | 29-03-1981 | |
| 20 | 2:37:44 | Elena Tsukhlo (URS) | 1 | Uzhgorod, Soviet Union | 11-10-1981 | |
| 21 | 2:37:56 | Magda Ilands (BEL) | 1 | Berchem, Belgium | 11-09-1981 | |
| 22 | 2:37:57 | Raisa Smekhnova (URS) | 1 | Kaliningrad, Soviet Union | 16-08-1981 | |
| 23 | 2:38:04 | Lorrie Dierdorff (USA) | 10 | Boston, United States | 20-04-1981 | |
| 24 | 2:38:20 | Jane Wipf (USA) | 2 | Tokyo, Japan | 15-11-1981 | |
| 25 | 2:38:25.9 | Julie Isphording (USA) | 3 | Ottawa, Canada | 23-08-1981 | |
| 26 | 2:38:29.6 | Kellie Archuletta (USA) | 3 | Dallas, United States | 05-12-1981 | |
| 27 | 2:38:49 | Anna Domoratskaya (URS) | 2 | Uzhgorod, Soviet Union | 11-10-1981 | |
| 28 | 2:38:58 | Zoya Ivanova (URS) | 1 | Agen, France | 13-09-1981 | |
| 29 | 2:39:07.3 | Michele Bush (USA) | 6 | Ottawa, Canada | 23-08-1981 | |
| 30 | 2:39:11 | Jan Yerkes (USA) | 1 | Philadelphia, United States | 05-12-1981 | |
| 31 | 2:39:32.7 | Cindy Dalrymple (USA) | 1 | Los Angeles, United States | 29-03-1981 | |
| 32 | 2:39:43 | Chantal Langlacé (FRA) | 1 | Essonne, France | 15-03-1981 | |
| 33 | 2:39:48 | Eileen Claugus (USA) | 2 | Honolulu, United States | 29-03-1981 | |
| 34 | 2:40:28 | Irina Bondarchuk (URS) | 1 | Leningrad, Soviet Union | 13-08-1981 | |
| 35 | 2:40:44 | Gillian Horovitz (ENG) | 3 | London, United Kingdom | 29-03-1981 | |
| 36 | 2:40:48 | Nancy Mieszczak (USA) | 1 | Niagara Falls, Canada | 17-10-1981 | |
| 37 | 2:40:58.4 | Doreen Ennis (USA) | 2 | Los Angeles, United States | 29-03-1981 | |
| 38 | 2:41:04.0 | Jennifer White (USA) | 1 | Toronto, Canada | 29-03-1981 | |
| 39 | 2:41:34 | Ingrid Kristiansen (NOR) | 1 | Stockholm, Sweden | 15-08-1981 | |
| 40 | 2:41:40 | Carol Gould (ENG) | 1 | Miami, United States | 17-01-1981 | |
| 41 | 2:41:44 | Jane Buch (USA) | 4 | Columbus, United States | 11-10-1981 | |
| 42 | 2:41:48 | Nanae Sasaki (JPN) | 13 | Boston, United States | 20-04-1981 | |
| 43 | 2:41:50 | Karlene Herrell (USA) | 1 | Omaha, United States | 07-11-1981 | |
| 44 | 2:42:00 | Annick Loir (FRA) | 1 | Neuf Brisach, France | 25-10-1981 | |
| 45 | 2:42:11 | Chantal Navarro (FRA) | 1 | Beuvrages, France | 20-06-1981 | |
| 46 | 2:42:12 | Suzan Morris (ENG) | 2 | Essonne, France | 15-03-1981 | |
| 47 | 2:42:12 | Jackie Turney (AUS) | 1 | Melbourne, Australia | 29-03-1981 | |
| 48 | 2:42:26 | Kathy Molitor (USA) | 4 | London, United Kingdom | 29-03-1981 | |
| 49 | 2:42:27 | Isavel Roche-Kelly (RSA) | 1 | Stellenbosch, South Africa | 21-11-1981 | |
| 50 | 2:42:41.3 | Monika Lövenich (FRG) | 2 | Monchengladbach, West Germany | 27-06-1981 | |
