= Tony Sandoval =

Anthony B. Sandoval (born May 19, 1954) is a former world-class marathon runner, most noted for winning the 1980 U.S. Olympic Marathon trials, in the year the U.S. boycotted the Moscow Olympics. Sandoval's 2:10:19 performance in Buffalo, New York, on May 24, 1980, was a US Olympic Trials record and faster than the 1980 Olympic Marathon winning time of 2:11:03.

== Career ==
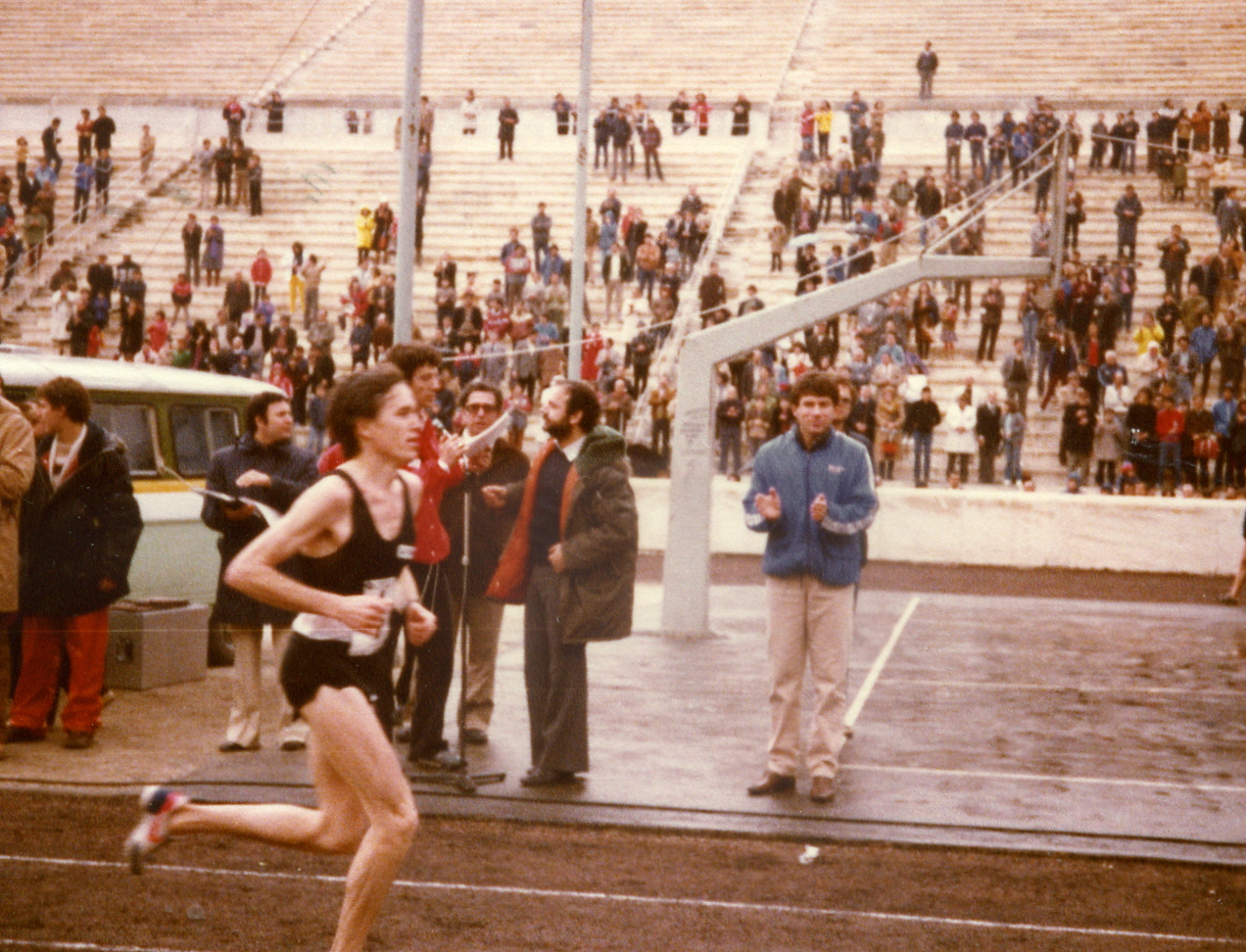
Sandoval finishing the IAAF Citizen Golden Marathon, in Athens, Greece in March 1982

Competing for the Stanford Cardinal track and field team, Sandoval finished 8th in the 10,000 m at the 1974 NCAA Division I Outdoor Track and Field Championships.

In his first attempt to make the Olympic team "Sandoval took a crack at the '76 Olympic Marathon Trial. He'd run a 2:19 debut in Phoenix the previous December. In the trial, held in Eugene, Oregon, Sandoval ran well but it was his first near-miss: fourth-place [with the top three making the team] in 2:14:58."

In the late 1970s, Sandoval worked towards becoming a medical doctor and competed in marathons on unusually light training. Following the 1976 trials, he trained by running 35 miles per week and ran "a 2:14:37 for second place at the Nike-Oregon Track Club Marathon in Eugene in 1978. After that, he ran 2:15:23 for 15th place in the Boston Marathon in 1979."

In September 1979, Sandoval finished the Nike OTC Marathon tied for first with Jeff Wells with a time of 2:10:20, with the two runners crossing the finish line hand-in-hand.

Sandoval's lifetime best for 10,000 meters came at the Mt. Sac relays in 1984, where he ran 27:47.0 for fifth place. Sandoval was inducted into the Road Runners Club of America Hall of Fame in 1999.

Sandoval is currently a cardiologist in Los Alamos, New Mexico, US.

Sandoval is referenced in the 2010 novel Again to Carthage by John L. Parker Jr.

== Achievements ==
Year	Competition	Venue	Position	Event	Notes
Representing the United States
1976	United States Olympic Trials	Eugene, Oregon	4th	Marathon	2:14:58
1980	United States Olympic Trials	Buffalo, New York	1st	Marathon	2:10:19
1981	New York City Marathon	New York, United States	6th	Marathon	2:12:12
