= Marty Cooksey =

American long-distance runner

Medal record

Women's athletics

Representing the United States

Pan American Games
Gold medal – first place	1987 Indianapolis	10,000 m

Martha "Marty" Cooksey (born July 18, 1954) is an American former long-distance runner who competed in events ranging from 5000 meters to the marathon. She achieved her marathon best time of 2:35:42 hours at the American Olympic Trials in 1984.

She had her career peak in 1978, winning marathons in San Diego and Atlanta, as well as the American title with her runner-up finish at the 1978 New York City Marathon. Her times for 15 km, 20 km and half marathon were retrospectively recognised as women's world records for the road distances. Internationally, she competed for the United States at the IAAF World Cross Country Championships in 1982 and won the gold medal over 10,000 meters at the 1987 Pan American Games in Indianapolis.

== Career ==
Raised in Orange County, California, Cooksey attended California State University, Fullerton, but her sporting focus was on basketball and volleyball while she studied there. She began taking part in women's road races in the late 1970s during the time of the running boom in the United States. She won the women's race at the 1978 San Diego Marathon in January with a run of 2:54:06 hours. Following this, she entered the 1978 Avon International Marathon held in Atlanta, Georgia, and was the surprise winner of the event, defeating more established runners such as Kim Merritt and Miki Gorman.

That year, Cooksey competed frequently and managed a total of 24 road races. She won the Lilac Bloomsday Run in May. A month later at the Cascade Runoff in Portland, Oregon, she ran a women's world record time of 51:37 minutes for the 15 km. August saw her set another women's best of 1:15:04 hours in the half marathon at the inaugural edition of San Diego's America's Finest City Half Marathon. She won her first national title at the New York City Marathon, coming second only to Grete Waitz. Although she had led for much of the race at a world record pace, she faded badly after 16 miles and crawled to the finish line, recording a time of 2:41:49 hours. Her fastest marathon run of the year came in December at the Honolulu Marathon, where she was the runner-up in 2:45:42 hours behind Patti Catalano.

In 1979 she won the Los Angeles Marathon in a personal record time of 2:43:33 hours and set a world best time of 1:11:24 hours for the 20 km in Far Hills. She won her second ever US Championship race that year, taking the 30 km title in Springdale, Ohio. Cooksey was chosen as the Female Road Runner of the Year for 1979 by the Road Runners Club of America. The year after, she retained her 30 km national title, improved her marathon best to 2:41:01 hours (coming sixth at the London Marathon), and was also fourth at the Honolulu Marathon. Her racing began to be affected by injury from the 1980 season onwards and she only managed a competitive return two years later.

Cooksey made her international debut at the 1982 IAAF World Cross Country Championships, where she placed 17th and helped the American women's team to fourth in the rankings. She missed the rest of the season due to a repeated stress fracture injury. After she recovered, she came second behind Gabriela Andersen-Schiess at the California International Marathon in Sacramento and her time gained her qualification into the 1984 Los Angeles Olympics Trial. The trial race was highly competitive as it came at a time of a burgeoning women's running scene in the United States and, as well as being on home soil, it was the first time the marathon was to be held for women at the Summer Olympics. Cooksey achieved a significant personal record time of 2:35:42 hours at the trial race in Olympia, Washington, but this was only enough for thirteenth place overall. Injuries yet again spoilt her 1985 and 1986 seasons, although she won the American 5K road title in the latter year.

It was not until the 1987 Pittsburgh Marathon that Cooksey competed over the full 42.195 km distance. Despite the long absence from the event, she came fifth and ran a time of 2:36:41 hours – her second fastest ever performance. Although it was her final year of competing at the top level, it was the first in which she won an international medal. At the 1987 Pan American Games in Indianapolis, she was selected to represent the host nation in the 10,000 meters. She retired from her running career in 1988, but continued to participate sporadically and won the Colorado Springs Pike's Peak race at the age of forty-three.
