= Bruce Hyde =

Bruce Hyde may refer to:

- Bruce Hyde (ontologist) (1941–2015), American actor and educator
- Bruce Hyde (musician) (born 1986), American musician and athlete
