= Avon International Marathon =

Women's marathon event

- Location: Various
- Event type: Road
- Distance: Marathon
- Established: 1978
- Last held: 1984
- Course records: 2:26:26, Julie Brown (1983)

The Avon International Marathon was an annual women's marathon event that was held at various locations from 1978 to 1984. Sponsored and organised by Avon Products, a beauty and household goods company, it was the longest distance race within the Avon International Women's Running Circuit, which was created with the aim of promoting elite and grassroots road running for women. The circuit was headed by former runner Kathrine Switzer, whose efforts had led to the formal acceptance of women at the Boston Marathon.

The International Olympic Committee required the participation of a minimum of 25 countries in international competition in order to accept new events to the Olympic schedule, thus Avon focused on attracting runners from many nations. The series was successful in its aim of establishing the marathon as a women's discipline, led by the International Runners' Committee, with the inaugural women's marathons at the 1982 European Championships and 1983 World Championship preceding the first women's Olympic marathon in 1984. The 1983 Avon International Marathon took place in Los Angeles, where the Olympic marathon race was hosted the following year.

Although the Avon marathon was exclusively hosted in North America and Western Europe, its international focus was a boost to elite women's running outside of these regions – the Tokyo International Women's Marathon was established as the first women's race to receive sanction by the International Amateur Athletic Federation in 1979.

The competition was one of several initiatives for women's sport by Avon during the period, which also included the Avon Futures Tennis Championships.

== Past events ==
Edition	Year	Date	Participation	Location	Winner	Time (h:m:s)
1st	1978	19 March	136, 9 nations	Atlanta, United States	Marty Cooksey (USA)	2:46:26
2nd	1979	22 September	250+, 25 nations	Waldniel, West Germany	Joyce Smith (GBR)	2:36:27
3rd	1980	3 August	155	London, United Kingdom	Lorraine Moller (NZL)	2:35:11
4th	1981	23 August	340	Ottawa, Canada	Nancy Conz (USA)	2:36:46
5th	1982	6 June	477	San Francisco, United States	Lorraine Moller (NZL)	2:36:13
6th	1983	6 June	936	Los Angeles, California	Julie Brown (USA)	2:26:26
7th	1984	23 September		Paris, France	Lorraine Moller (NZL)	2:32:44
