= Liane Winter =

German long-distance runner (1942–2021)

Liane Winter (June 24, 1942 – January 17, 2021) was a West German long-distance runner, who was recognized by the International Association of Athletics Federations as having set a world best at the 1975 Boston Marathon with a time of 2:42:24. (Note: The Association of Road Racing Statisticians notes Winter's official time as 2:42:25.) Winter, the first woman from outside the United States to win Boston, only briefly held the mark as her countrywoman, Christa Vahlensieck, turned in a 2:40:16 performance in Dülmen twelve days later. Winter's 1975 performance at Boston was aided by a "25-mile-an-hour tailwind", after which she asked for a beer through her translator. At the 1976 Boston Marathon, she finished in tenth place.

== Biography ==
Running as much as 60 kilometers (37.2 miles) on a Saturday or Sunday, Winter trained by Ernst van Aaken's method of building endurance. On May 5, 1974 in Wolfsburg, West Germany, Winter ran a marathon in 2:57:44.4 to set the fastest mark for German women. In an event organized by van Aaken, she was one of 45 women from seven nations to compete for the first women's world marathon title, the Women's International Championship in Waldniel, West Germany on September 22, 1974. Christa Vahlensieck and Chantal Langlacé caught up to her after she took an early lead on the four-lap course, however, Winter crossed the finish line first in a time of 2:50:31.4 to earn a European record and lowered the national mark she set a little over four months earlier.

Winter also set the German road mark in the 10,000 metres with a 37:16 in Bruges, Belgium in 1977. She won the Budapest Marathon in 1971, the Maryland Marathon in 1975, and the Schwarzwald Marathon three consecutive times from 1976 to 1978.

Winter was from Wolfsburg. In 1975 she was an accountant at a Volkswagen factory.

== See also ==
- Women's marathon world record progression

== Notes ==
Records
Preceded by (United States) Jacqueline Hansen	Women's Marathon World Record Holder; April 21, 1975 – May 3, 1975	Succeeded by (West Germany) Christa Vahlensieck
