= Bruce Hyde (musician) =

American athlete and musician

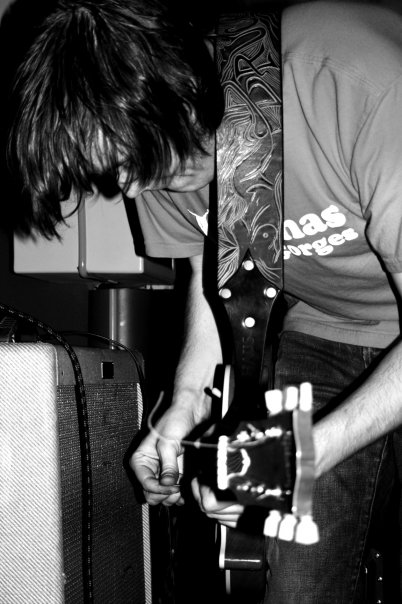
Hyde on stage.

Bruce Hyde (born 1986) of Waitsfield in Vermont's Mad River Valley and Ithaca, New York is an American former champion runner, competitive in the 1500m/Mile and other events. He is an artist and musician with the rock and roll band LOFTS.

== Music career ==
Since 2010 LOFTS has been Hyde's solo project. The band released a series of 3 EP's over a 4-month period in 2013. Currently, the band is on hiatus.

A multi-instrument artist, Hyde was the vocalist and lyricist for Blow!. His musical partner was Notre Dame alumnus and arranger, Johnny Zachman. Blow!’s debut extended play record (EP) Overrated was mixed by David Peters at the Belfry Studio in Syracuse and at the Malgamar Studio House in Los Angeles and released on January 19, 2010. Blow! has performed with Nate & Kate, Driftwood, Revision, Asobi Seksu, Electric Tickle Machine and Evolve.

Formed from the open microphone jam sessions at Ithaca, New York’s The Nines, Blow! developed a strong local following in central New York, Rochester and Brooklyn prior to signing its first publishing contract with Fish Group Music and recording a single with New York City producer Jimmy Bralower who has also produced Peter Gabriel, Celine Dion, Hall and Oates and R. Kelly.

A music critic has described Hyde’s work as singing while "elongating the vowels and stretching the words like syrup over lush strings and layered harmonies ... If Hyde's vocal approach is decidedly retro, he at times sounds like a natural 60s soul singer that might appear on a Stax Record, Blow! is decidedly modern, a cross between Andrew Bird and the best of popular indie rock." Hyde began his transition from competitive intercollegiate athletics to music with Bruce Hyde and the Midnight Run (BHMR), house band for the Royal Palm Tavern in Ithaca, New York.

== Athletic competition ==
In secondary school competition, Bruce Hyde was a 4:20 miler. As a team member for Cornell University Track & Field Team, he achieved a 4:00 equivalent and fourth-place showing at the 2004 USA Indoor Meet with an 8:03 and then a 3:42. He won the Heptagonal title, the NCAA Regional title, and All-American honors at the NCAAs, where he finished just behind Ryan Hall.

After 2004, Bruce Hyde took a hiatus from competitive running. Early in 2006, comeback rumors circulated. The official comeback did occur in 2008, when Hyde ran a 3:55.76 full mile at the Cornell Opener in late March. In fact, it was later revealed in 2008 that a puckish Hyde had, indeed, staged a covert comeback in 2006. He ran under the pseudonym Bruce Denton. The 2008 effort was complicated. Track statisticians debated whether it should count as an Ivy League record. At issue was whether the fact that Hyde was in his 8th year at Cornell should disqualify his standing. Shifting focus later that year, Hyde entered the World Series of Poker.

== Associations ==
Hyde joined the Phi Kappa Psi fraternity at Cornell University, and through that organization, the Irving Literary Society.
