= Racing the Rain =

Book by John L. Parker, Jr.

- Author: John L. Parker Jr.
- Language: English
- Genre: Realistic fiction
- Published: July 14, 2015
- Publisher: Scribner
- Publication place: United States
- ISBN: 1-476-76986-9

Racing the Rain is a novel by American author John L. Parker Jr. initially published July 14, 2015. It is the prequel to Parker's 1978 New York Times Bestseller Once a Runner and is part of the Once a Runner Trilogy. Racing the Rain is a coming of age story that tells a story of how Quenton Cassidy, who just so happens to be the main character of the novel: Once a Runner, discovers his exceptional running ability and develops the work ethic to become a great athlete.

Quenton is a teenager in southeast Florida during the 1960s, and though living through tumultuous world events like the Cuban Missile Crisis and the assassination of John F. Kennedy, Quenton is more preoccupied with making the basketball team, facing obstinate coaches, and fishing with his mentor Trapper Nelson. Parker gives a compelling narrative of a boy reconciling his dreams with his capabilities and discovering the tainted reality of his southern paradise.

== Plot ==
Shirtless and barefoot for most of his youth, Quenton Cassidy grew up exploring the natural environment surrounding his neighborhood nestled between the Loxahatchee River and the Atlantic Ocean. Racing the Rain introduces the reader to Quenton in elementary school where he plays games, runs foot races, and feeds his curiosity with his best friends Stiggs and Randleman. Breaks of ice-cold Kool-Aid and frothy A&W root beer divide the hot Florida days. Quenton's small stature, big mouth, and affinity for practical jokes often gets him into trouble with teachers and other students. That is, until he becomes friends with Trapper.

Trapper Nelson is both man and legend. He is the real-life swamp man who “wrestled alligators for fun, [and] laughed at poisonous snakes.” When Trapper becomes friends with Quenton, the two strike a business deal when Trapper recognizes Quenton's extraordinary ability to hold his breath and dive deep into the water. He teaches Quenton about life on the Loxahatchee fishing, trapping, and entertaining influential men with wildlife shows, poker, and beer. Taking Quenton under his wing, Trapper becomes a pivotal influence in Quenton's life. Though Quenton's first love is basketball, Trapper convinces Quenton to try out long distant running on the side. Quenton is a natural runner due to his efficiency in using oxygen. He can't bring himself to give up basketball, but Quenton begins to recognize his own talents.

As Quenton grows older and draws nearer to high school, he begins to play basketball with his friends at the local military base Fort Murphy. Some of the soldiers there humor the youth with pick-up games of basketball, helping Quenton and his friends quickly improve their skills. This was not enough to help Quenton, still short and scrawny, be a starter on the junior high basketball team. Frustrated with himself and his coach, Quenton is motivated to do everything he could to not only make the high school basketball team, but be a key player. His friends at Fort Murphy and Trapper Nelson, who wasn't just a wilderness man but a talented athlete himself, teach Quenton different shooting and dribbling drills. Every afternoon between the two basketball seasons, Quenton goes to the military base to practice on the basketball courts. When he joins the high school basketball team, he starts every game on the JV and leads the squad in points. The next season, Quenton, Stiggs, and Randleman all start on Varsity. They have a winning season and go to the state semi-finals. They looked forward to the next season and the prospects of winning state, but their success would be short lived.

Because of his new found success, Quenton's basketball coach Jim Cinnamon decides to sign a contract with the prestigious Miami Senior High School. Replacing Cinnamon is the track coach Bob Bickerstaff. Inexperienced in coaching basketball and hard headed, Bickerstaff forced the team to play a rigid style of basketball that was highly inefficient and ineffective. After losing several games in a row, Quenton gets frustrated one game and decides to lead the team in rebellion on the court against Coach Bickerstaff's gameplan. Though the team immediately begins to have success with Quenton's leadership, the prideful coach sets Quenton on the bench. His team loses the game, and Bickerstaff cuts Quenton from the team for subordination. Quenton can't believe it, but because of this trial, he invests himself in running and finally realizes where his true strengths are.

Quenton puts all his heart and soul into preparing for the track season if only to spite Coach Bickerstaff. Though he had been successful in cross country in the past, Quenton had never dedicated himself to running like he had basketball. That all changed with his being kicked off the team. He eventually runs fast enough to qualify for the state meet in the mile, but the week before the race, tragedy strikes: Trapper Nelson is arrested for the murder of a moonshiner named Lew Gene Harvey. The preliminary hearing for his case is going to be the day of the State meet. Though Trapper tells him he should run the meet, Quenton finds himself in a personal dilemma because he wants to be there in the courthouse to support his friend and mentor. Trapper doesn't want to Quenton to miss his race and is able to cut a deal with the police to help find the true murderers of the moonshiner. Without the case distracting him, Quenton is able to focus on preparing for the state meet. In the state race, Quenton comes from behind to beat the runner seated favorite to win the race and becomes the state champion in the mile. After the race is over, Quenton is introduced to Ben Cornwall, the head track coach at Southeastern University. Quenton is given a scholarship to Southeastern University, packs his things, and moves into Doobey Hall, where the events of Once a Runner begin.
