= Benji Durden =

Olympian and coach (born 1951)

Personal information
- Nationality: American
- Born: October 28, 1951 (age 74) Boulder, Colorado

Sport
- Sport: Marathon

Achievements and titles
- Personal best: Marathon: 2:09:57 (1983)
Medal record
Men's athletics
World Marathon Majors
Bronze medal – third place	1983 Boston	Marathon

Benji Durden (born August 28, 1951) is a Boulder, Colorado based runner and former running coach who came to prominence as a distance runner in the early 1980s, at the height of the American running boom. Durden was a member of the 1980 Summer Olympics United States marathon team, placing second against what to that point was perhaps the deepest field of American marathoners ever assembled. With a personal record of 2:09:57, Durden recorded 25 sub-2:20 marathons in less than a decade. He ranked among the top ten US marathoners six straight years, reaching seventh in the world in 1982.

== Early life and education ==
Durden ran track in Sacramento, California as a youth, aspiring to become a miler. After moving to Georgia, he attended Wayne County High School where he set school records in the mile (4:36) and 880 (2:04). After graduation he went to the University of Georgia, in Athens (UGA), where he ran the mile in 4:15 as a freshman. He graduated from UGA in 1973.

After college, Durden moved to Stone Mountain, becoming a fixture on the Atlanta-area running scene while working at Jeff Galloway’s Phidippides running shop.

Durden won the inaugural Cooper River Bridge Run, which was shortened to 9,850 meters by authorities after the gun started for the race, in 1978.

== 1980 Olympic Trials ==
In 1980, on a course running from Buffalo, New York, to Niagara Falls, Ontario, Durden finished second in the symbolic US Olympic Trials (the boycott had already been announced by the time the Trials were held in May) against one of the deepest field of American marathoners ever assembled. Durden surged into the lead at the 18 mile mark and built up a ten second advantage over the lead runners until Anthony Sandoval caught him in the 23rd mile. Sandoval pulled away in the 24th mile and went on to win the race. Durden finished second in a time of 2:10:40.3, a personal best by over three minutes.

The race was intended to determine the US Olympic team for the marathon at that summer's Summer Olympics in Moscow, USSR; however, President Carter had ordered the team to sit out the Olympics. Durden did however receive one of 461 Congressional Gold Medals created especially for the spurned athletes.

== Marathon career ==
Durden's marathon career debuted at the 1974 Peach Bowl Marathon. After he dropped out, he told friends, "Anyone who runs a marathon is sick."

In 1975, Durden returned to the Peach Bowl Marathon, seeking to break 2:23, the Olympic trials qualifying mark for the 1976 Summer Olympics. He finished in 2:36:19, well off the qualifying standard. But at the 1976 AAU National Marathon Championship Rice Festival Marathon in Lafayette, Louisiana, he finished second in 2:20:23.

Durden's first marathon win came in 1977, in Columbia, South Carolina (which had a marathon at the time; that race was last run in 2000 as the U. S. Olympic Women's Marathon Trials) in 2:19.04.

Durden lowered his personal bests with impressive races at the 1979 Nike/OTC marathon (2:13:47) and the New York City Marathon (2:13:49), before having his big breakthrough in the 1980 "Olympic Trials" race. His time of 2:09:57 in the 1983 Boston Marathon, where he finished third, is his lifetime best.

As a Masters runner (40 and over), Durden once again ran the Atlanta Marathon in 1991 winning in 2:28:52. He followed that victory by winning the Masters division of the Huntsville Marathon in 2:32:48.

Durden continues to run, returning to Huntsville, Alabama (where he had finished his last marathon fourteen years earlier), and competed in his first marathon as a Grand Masters (50 and older) runner in 2005, finishing in 3:08:34. In December, 2006, he returned to Sacramento where he recorded a time of 3:01:03 at the California International Marathon. In 2013 he completed a goal of running a marathon in all 50 states plus D.C. in under 4 hours. As of 2020 he had completed 136 marathons.

== Achievements ==
Year	Competition	Venue	Position	Event	Notes
Representing the United States
1978	Boston Marathon	Boston, United States	11th	Marathon	2:15:04
1979	Nike OTC Marathon	Eugene, Oregon	6th	Marathon	2:13:47
1979	New York City Marathon	New York City, United States	5th	Marathon	2:13:49
1980	Boston Marathon	Boston, United States	6th	Marathon	2:17:46
1980	US Olympic Trials	Buffalo, New York	2nd	Marathon	2:10:40
1980	Fukuoka Marathon	Fukuoka, Japan	12th	Marathon	2:13:25
1981	Miami Marathon	Miami, United States	1st	Marathon	2:12:34
1981	Tokyo Marathon	Tokyo, Japan	4th	Marathon	2:13:07
1981	Nike OTC Marathon	Eugene, Oregon	1st	Marathon	2:12:12
1982	Houston Marathon	Houston, United States	1st	Marathon	2:11:12
1982	Montreal Marathon	Montreal, Canada	1st	Marathon	2:13:22
1982	Nike OTC Marathon	Eugene, Oregon	3rd	Marathon	2:12:52
1983	Houston Marathon	Houston, United States	2nd	Marathon	2:12:20
1983	Boston Marathon	Boston, United States	3rd	Marathon	2:09:57
1983	World Championships	Helsinki, Finland	39th	Marathon	2:20:38
1983	Toronto Marathon	Toronto, Canada	1st	Marathon	2:15:16

Source:Association of Road Racing Statisticians (ARRS) Runner:Benji Durden
