= Jon Anderson (athlete) =

American athlete

Jon Peter Anderson (born October 12, 1949) is an American publisher and former long-distance runner. He is best known for winning the 1973 Boston Marathon. Anderson was a competitive long-distance runner from 1966 to 1984. He represented the United States as a member of the 1972 US Olympic track and field team. He is a lifelong Eugene, Oregon resident.

== Collegiate career ==
In 1971, Anderson graduated from Cornell University in Ithaca, New York, with a bachelor's degree in economics. In the Ivy League and at the national level, Anderson notched numerous achievements during his collegiate career. His coach during college was long-time, successful Cornell Coach Jack Warner. In 1969 and 1970, Anderson was an Ivy League cross country first team selection, winning the championship in 1970. In the spring of 1970, he was named an NCAA All-American when he placed third in the NCAA Division I six-mile at Drake Stadium, Des Moines, Iowa. He won the Ivy League and Heptagonal Cross Country Championship in 1970 at Van Cortlandt Park, New York City. Anderson was injured (stress fracture) during the 1971 outdoor track season. In his senior year at Cornell, Anderson was elected to the Sphinx Head senior honor society. He was also a member of the Phi Kappa Psi fraternity.

== The Olympics 10K, Boston Marathon, and beyond ==
After graduating from Cornell in 1971, Anderson qualified for the 1972 US Olympic track and field team in the 10,000 meters event at the US Olympic Trials in his hometown, Eugene, Oregon. His father, Les Anderson, was the mayor of Eugene at that time. In front of hometown fans in a stirring finish, Anderson passed Jack Bacheler in the final 50 meters of the race, making up more than eight seconds in the last lap on Bacheler to surprise all in earning the third spot on the US Olympic team. He had placed as the 6th American in the AAU 10,000m in Seattle just two weeks earlier. Anderson ran the 10,000 meters at the Munich Olympics, placing eighth in his heat in 28:34.2, a personal record; however, he did not make the final.

Anderson began his running career in Eugene as a senior at Sheldon High School. Bill Bowerman, the legendary University of Oregon track coach and a longtime family friend, taught Anderson the fundamentals of distance running at the beginning of his serious competitive distance running career. Anderson's pivotal achievements helped Eugene to establish itself as a mecca for running, well ahead of the ensuing running boom that rippled across the United States during the 1980s.

In February 1972, Anderson won the Channel to Lake 10-Mile Run in Vallejo, California, with a time of 47:46, establishing an unofficial national road race record for the distance.

Anderson achieved his greatest success in 1973, winning the 77th Boston Marathon, in a time of 2:16:03 on a very warm day. He overtook defending champion Olavi Suomalainen of Finland on Heartbreak Hill. The then 23-year-old Anderson thus became the first athlete to win a major international sporting event in Nike shoes. At 6 feet 2 inches (1.88 m), Anderson and the 1942 winner, Bernard Joseph Smith, were Boston's tallest champions. Later in 1973, he placed fourth in the Fukuoka Marathon in Japan (behind four-time Fukuoka winner Frank Shorter).

Anderson served as a pallbearer at the funeral for the legendary Steve Prefontaine, who had died in an automobile accident on May 30, 1975.

Anderson also represented the US at the 1977 World Cross Country Championships in Düsseldorf, Germany.

Anderson's best marathon time is 2:12:03, in a fourth-place finish at the 1980 Nike OTC Marathon, in Eugene, Oregon.

In June 1981, Anderson won the Antwerp Marathon in Belgium in a time of 2:17:32, and later that year he won the Honolulu Marathon in Hawaii, where he was timed in 2:16:54. In his last year of competition at age 34, Anderson clocked his 2nd and 3rd fastest marathons, winning a June 1984 marathon in Sydney, Australia, in 2:13:18 after placing 5th in 2:13:22 at the Beppu-Oita Marathon (Japan) earlier in the year. In his last race, in September 1984, he placed 4th at the Seoul Marathon (South Korea) in 2:16:04 just prior to retiring from competitive running. He ran 21 marathons, finishing 16 of them in under 2:20:00.

In 1985, Anderson was inducted into Cornell University's Hall of Fame. He is also a member of the Road Runners Club of America Hall of Fame, inducted in 2016. In addition, he is recognized at Nike's headquarters with a plaque along the company's Walk of Fame as the first Nike-sponsored athlete to win an event recognized world wide while wearing Nike shoes.

== Achievements ==
- All results regarding marathon, unless stated otherwise

Year	Competition	Venue	Position	Notes
Representing the United States
1973	Boston Marathon	Boston, United States	1st	2:16:03
1981	Honolulu Marathon	Honolulu, United States	1st	2:16:54
1981	Antwerp Marathon	Antwerp, Belgium	1st	2:17:32
1984	Wang Australia Marathon	Sydney, Australia	1st	2:13:18

== Professional career ==
In 1974, Jon Anderson joined Random Lengths Publications, which publishes forest products market activity and price reports. He was named president and publisher in 1984–85 at the same time becoming the sole owner after 60 years of Anderson family ownership. He sold the company in 2018 to London-based Euromoney Institutional Investors. He retired at that time. He served on the University of Oregon Foundation Board of Trustees from 2005 to 2015. Anderson is currently the president of the Eugene Civic Alliance, a non-profit raising funds to redevelop the Civic Park site in Eugene.
