= Kevin Ryan (runner) =

New Zealand long-distance runner

Kevin Barry Ryan (born 22 July 1949 in Auckland) is a retired male long-distance runner from New Zealand, who represented his native country in the men's marathon at the 1976 Summer Olympics in Montreal, Quebec, Canada. He was also a member of the ill-fated 1980 Olympic team which at the last minute boycotted the Moscow Olympics in support of the USA's boycott.

Furthermore, he was a member of the NZ team at three consecutive Commonwealth Games, starting in 1974. In 1983 he won the Honolulu Marathon.

During most of his career Ryan was coached by the New Zealand legend, Barry Magee, who had also been a world class marathoner during the height of his career.

In 1978 Ryan held the number 10 world ranking in the marathon for his effort in the Boston Marathon, which saw him place sixth in a time of 2:11:44. In 1979 Kevin held the world ranking of 22nd for his time of 2:12:33 in the Fukuoka Marathon.

Ryan ran many marathons during his career, a few of which are listed below:

== Achievements ==
Year	Competition	Venue	Position	Event	Notes
Representing New Zealand
1975	NZ Games Marathon		1st	Marathon	2:14:30
1975	Australian Marathon		1st	Marathon	2:13:15
1975	Boston Marathon	Boston, United States	6th	Marathon	2:11:43
1978	Commonwealth Games	Edmonton, Alberta	4th	Marathon	2:17:16
1978	Foamu Marathon		9th	Marathon	2:12:30
1979	NZ Wiri Marathon		1st	Marathon	2:12:11
1981	Toronto Marathon	Toronto, Canada	1st	Marathon	2:13:26
1982	Commonwealth Games	Brisbane, Australia	5th	Marathon	2:13:42
1983	Honolulu Marathon	Honolulu, United States	1st	Marathon	2:20:19
