= Kim Merritt =

American long-distance runner

- Born: May 21, 1955 (age 70); Racine, Wisconsin, United States
- Occupation: Long-distance runner
- Years active: 1973—1984

Kim Merritt (born May 22, 1955 in Racine, Wisconsin) is a former American long-distance runner who competed in the marathon. Her career coincided with the development of women's running in the United States and she was at the forefront of distance running in the mid-1970s.

She won the 1975 New York City Marathon and in 1976 she took the women's titles at both the Boston and Honolulu Marathons. Her personal best time of 2:37:57, set at the 1977 Nike OTC Marathon, was an American record for the distance and made her the fourth best runner worldwide that year. Merritt also won numerous shorter races on the national circuit, including the Falmouth Road Race, Crim 10 mile run and Gate River Run. She ceased competing around 1980, although she made an unsuccessful attempt at the 1984 Olympic Marathon Trials.

== Career ==
She attended the University of Wisconsin–Parkside and won the state cross country championship in 1973, going on to place fifth at the nationals. During her time there she received AIAW honours in track and field and cross country, as well as earning Academic All-America honours for her studies as a student-athlete.

Merritt took the inaugural honours at the Quad-City Times Bix 7 Mile in July 1975 and then won the Charleston Distance Run the following month – she returned to both competitions in 1976 and retained her titles. The twenty-year-old Merritt made her major marathon debut in September 1975 at the New York City Marathon and defeated Michiko Gorman to win the race in a time of 2:46:15 hours. This also made her that year's national champion over the distance and ranked her as the fourth fastest woman in the world in 1975.

She ran in three marathons the following year, starting with a win at the Boston Marathon in April. Running in her first race abroad, she took second place at the Waldniel Women's Marathon in West Germany behind Christa Vahlensieck. Her third and final run over the distance in 1976 came at the 1976 Honolulu Marathon in December, which she won in a personal record time of 2:44:44. This was the fastest run by an American woman that year.

Merritt broke the American record for the distance at the 1977 Nike OTC Marathon in Eugene, Oregon, winning the women's race with a time of 2:37:57. She returned to the New York Marathon but finished as the runner-up, beaten to the finish by Michiko Gorman.

Merritt entered and won a number of road races in 1977: she won the seven-mile Falmouth Road Race, the Crim 10 mile run, the Virginia Ten Miler, She also took consecutive wins at the Bellin Run 10K from 1977–79. She was the inaugural winner of the Gate River Run 15K in 1978 and won the second edition of the Ogden Newspapers 20K Classic held that same year.

The 1978 season was her busiest in terms of marathons: she opened her year at the Boston Marathon, just missing the podium with a fourth-place finish, and ran at the inaugural Cleveland Marathon the following month, where she finished second after Jacqueline Hansen. Her next race over the 26 miles and 385 yards distance came at the Oregon Track Club race and she finished sixth while the winner Julie Brown set the fastest time of the year. Merritt's final run of the year came at a race on home turf in New Glarus, Wisconsin, which she won in 2:53:53.

Her final year of competition at the top level was in 1979. She ran at the Boston Marathon and came in sixth place, although she was ten minutes behind the women's winner Joan Samuelson. The Avon Waldniel Marathon in September was a more successful outing, as she was the runner-up to England's Joyce Smith and completed the distance in 2:39:43 – the second fastest of her career. Merritt later married and had children, leading to the end of her running career. She made a brief return at the USA Olympic Marathon Trials for the 1984 Los Angeles Olympics, but her run of 2:43:31 was only enough for 53rd place.
