= Nike OTC Marathon =

Running race held in Eugene, Oregon (1973–1984)

The Nike OTC Marathon (sometimes styled "Nike/Oregon Track Club Marathon") was a marathon held annually from 1973 to 1984 in Eugene, Oregon. (Note: A predecessor "All-Comers" marathon was held in October 1971 and October 1972.) It was organized by the Oregon Track Club (OTC) and sponsored by Nike.

The women's world record for the marathon was set at the Nike OTC Marathon by Jacqueline Hansen, who ran 2:38:19 in 1975.

The American women's marathon record was broken four times at the Nike OTC Marathon in the 1970s and 1980s, by Jacqueline Hansen (2:38:19 in 1975), Kim Merritt (2:37:57 in 1977), Julie Brown (2:36:23 in 1978), and Joan Benoit (2:26:11 in 1982). The Boston Marathon is the only other race that has been the venue for more than three American women's marathon records.

== Winners ==
Year	Men	Time	Women	Time
1973	George Oja	2:27:07	Lili Ledbetter (Note: Ledbetter was 12 years old on race day.)	3:03:32
1974	Philip Camp	2:22:09	Roberta Moore	3:30:07
1975	Jon Peter Anderson	2:16:08	Jacqueline Hansen	2:38:19 WR (Note: Women's world record (WR)) (Note: Women's American record (NR = National record))
1976	Robert Hensley	2:21:56	Diane Barrett (Note: Barrett was 15 years old on race day.)	2:51:05
1977	Jeff Wells	2:13:15	Kim Merritt	2:37:57 NR
1978	Lionel Ortega	2:14:24	Julie Brown	2:36:23 NR
1979	Tony Sandoval and Jeff Wells (tie)	2:10:20	Joan Benoit	2:35:41
1980	Dick Quax	2:10:47 NR (Note: New Zealand men's national record (NR))	Lorraine Moller	2:31:42
1981	Benji Durden	2:12:12	Lorraine Moller	2:31:15
1982	Rodolfo Gómez	2:11:35	Joan Benoit	2:26:12 NR
1983	Gary Siriano	2:12:32	Akemi Masuda	2:30:30
1984	Alun Cole	2:23:25	Sue Mitchell	2:59:33

== Transition to 25K distance ==
National Masters News, self-described as the "official world and U.S. publication for Masters track & field, long distance running and race walking", reported in its 123rd issue in November 1988 that the race in Eugene that had formerly been the Nike Marathon became the Nike/OTC 25K as the course changed to a 25K in 1985 after Nike withdrew its prize money. In September 1988, Israeli Olympian Shem-Tov Sabag won the Nike/OTC (Nike/Oregon Track Club) 25K, with a time of 1:20:26, in what was to be the last running of the race, as Nike ended its sponsorship.

== See also ==
- Eugene Marathon (2007–present)
