= Jeff Wells =

American marathon runner and pastor

Jeff Wells (born 25 May 1954) is a marathon runner and pastor, originally from Madisonville, Texas, United States.

== Early life and education ==
Wells attended Rice University, majored in history, and was named an All-American four times in cross country and track.

== Running ==
Wells finished first in the 1976 Houston Marathon, the 1976 Dallas White Rock Marathon, the 1977 Honolulu Marathon, the 1977 and 1979 Nike OTC Marathons, the 1980 Stockholm Marathon, and the 1985 Wang New Zealand Marathon.

He came in second place to Bill Rodgers, by just two seconds, in the closest Boston Marathon finish to date, at the 1978 Boston Marathon, finishing in his fastest-ever marathon time of 2:10:15. Wells's time was either the third- or fourth-fastest by an American to that date, behind three runs by Rodgers, one of which was on a New York Marathon course later found to be shorter than the standard marathon length.

He finished fifth, in 2:13:16, at the 1980 U.S. Olympic Marathon Trials in Buffalo, New York, and fourth in the Olympic Trials 10,000-meter run in the same year.

He was the top American finisher, finishing 24th overall, at the 1977 IAAF World Cross Country Championships – Senior men's race.

== Pastor ==
Wells is the founding pastor of the WoodsEdge Community Church in Spring, Texas.

== Achievements ==
Source: ARRS

Year	Competition	Venue	Position	Event	Notes
1976	Houston Marathon	Houston, Texas	1st	Marathon	2:17:46
1976	White Rock Marathon	Dallas, Texas	1st	Marathon	2:15:11
1977	Nike OTC Marathon	Eugene, Oregon	1st	Marathon	2:13:15
1977	Honolulu Marathon	Honolulu, Hawaii	1st	Marathon	2:18:37
1978	Boston Marathon	Boston, Massachusetts	2nd	Marathon	2:10:15
1979	Nike OTC Marathon	Eugene, Oregon	1st (tied)	Marathon	2:10:20
1980	Stockholm Marathon	Stockholm, Sweden	1st	Marathon	2:15:49
1985	Wang New Zealand Marathon	Auckland, New Zealand	1st	Marathon	2:16:43
