= Once a Runner =

1978 novel by John L. Parker Jr.

- Author: John L. Parker Jr.
- Publisher: Cedarwinds
- Publication date: 1978
- ISBN: 0-915-29701-9

Once a Runner is a novel by American author John L. Parker Jr. and was first published in 1978 by Cedarwinds (0915297019). A reprint was later published by Scribner in 2009. In Once a Runner, Parker illustrates the hard work and dedication required of an elite runner. The novel was followed by the sequel Again to Carthage in 2008 and the prequel Racing the Rain in 2015.

Originally self published in 1978, Once a Runner was initially distributed by Parker himself. According to Runner's World, Parker printed the first 5,000 copies and distributed the novel through running shoe stores and races. Soon after, the book started to develop a following among competitive runners.

== Plot summary ==
The novel opens with a physically fit young man standing on a track, watching as "the night joggers" toil around him. He begins to walk toward the starting post and thinks that now that the Olympic games are over for him, he does not know what he will do with his life. The man starts to walk around the track and thinks back to four years ago.

Quenton Cassidy is a collegiate runner at fictional Southeastern University based on the University of Florida. He is a mid-distance runner who specializes in the Mile. After writing a petition for the college's athletes protesting a dress and conduct code, Quenton is suspended from the university and prohibited from competing in the university's annual track meet. Cassidy drops out, moves to a cabin in the woods, and submits himself to a brutal training regimen. He is under the coaching of fictional gold medalist Olympian Bruce Denton, based on Jack Bacheler. His plan is to compete at the Southeastern Relays against the best miler in the world, John Walton (obviously based on John Walker). Because he is barred from competing at the meet, Denton comes up with a plan to disguise him as a Finnish runner attending a nonexistent university in Ohio.

Cassidy, who has always dreamed of running a sub 4:00 mile, spends many months training for the race of his life, urged on by Denton, who is nearing the end of his running career due to injuries. After completing an agonizing interval workout of 60 quarter miles, Cassidy finally believes he is ready to face Walton. The night before the race, Cassidy performs a ritual of his to prepare himself for the meet—he walks a mile on the Southeastern track, putting all of his "demons" in a symbolic "orb" that will hold them in during the race and allow him to push through the pain.

The next day, Cassidy arrives disguised at the meet but spends more than an hour warming up on the cross-country course near the track. As the race draws nearer, Quenton fights to keep control of his adrenaline and anxiety, waiting until the race starts so he can unleash them. A large part of a chapter is devoted to the race itself, which comes down to a contest between Cassidy and Walton in the final lap. The novel describes the effect lactic acid has on Quenton as he fights to close in on Walton, who has a slight lead. Excruciatingly, Cassidy reels Walton in and outsprints him in the final straight to win the race in a time of 3:52.5.

After the race, the scene changes back to Cassidy standing at the Southeastern track, walking through the last lap of a mile. Quenton reflects upon his running career and realizes that while it is over for him, there is much to be left behind on the track. When he reaches the end of the lap, he reaches into his bag and pulls out a box with a silver Olympic medal inside. Cassidy thinks to himself that he can live with leaving behind his old life, and with a bittersweet feeling walks off into the night.

== Critical reception ==
Once a Runner, while dismissed by some critics as a cult classic that generally appeals only to competitive runners, has received considerable critical praise from Sports Illustrated, Track & Field News, and Runner's World.

== Characters ==
- Quenton Cassidy – The protagonist of the book, Cassidy is a collegiate runner whose dedication to the sport forces him to choose to drop out of school and run under the coaching of Bruce Denton (see below).
- Bruce Denton – A fictional Olympic champion runner who becomes Cassidy's friend and coach.
- Jerry Mizner – Cassidy's best friend and teammate.
- Andrea Cleland – Cassidy's girlfriend.
- Dick Doobey – The head football coach at Southeastern. He attempts to have Cassidy expelled from the school for disrupting loyalty among his athletes.
- John Walton – The world record holder for the mile, and the first person to run a time under 3 minutes and 50 seconds in the mile. His character is based on that of the famous miler John Walker. Cassidy's race against him is the novel's climactic moment.
- Mike Mobley – A very large thrower on the Southeastern Track and Field team. He is one of the team captains and greatly respects Cassidy.
