= Again to Carthage =

Novel by John L. Parker, Jr.

- Again to Carthage book cover
- Author: John L. Parker Jr.
- Language: English
- Genre: Realistic fiction
- Publisher: Breakaway Books
- Publication date: September 14, 2008
- Publication place: United States
- Media type: Print (hardback)
- Pages: 344
- ISBN: 1-891369-77-6
- Preceded by: Once a Runner

Again to Carthage is a novel by American author John L. Parker Jr. initially published April 1, 2008. It is the sequel to 1978 book Once a Runner.

== Plot summary ==
John Parker's "Again to Carthage" picks up where Parker's "Once a Runner" left off. Star college miler, Quenton Cassidy has returned home from the Olympic games where he has taken the silver medal in the 1500 meter "metric mile" race. After some time working as a lawyer he decides that he left the running life too soon and now in his early thirties (or thereabouts) decides to take up the rigorous, spartan distance running-training life again. This time aiming to make the United States Olympic marathon team.

Mr. Parker's unique writing skill is to immerse the attentive reader in the peculiar (by modern American standards) life of the serious distance runner while avoiding the mind-numbing attention to the daily grind of the athlete himself. Parker's achievement as a writer with his background as an accomplished distance runner, is to show how the stoicism and discipline of the serious runner manages to transform a mere man through a transcendent undertaking into what can almost be characterized as an apotheosis.

As Cassidy runs his race (the U.S. Olympic marathon trial) two strange, arguably metaphysical events leave the reader wondering what is real and what is being imagined. Through this crucible of the will, the protagonist, Quenton Cassidy is transformed from a mere mortal yet again (as in Parker's prequel, "Once a Runner"). As is the attentive reader in some small way.
