= John L. Parker Jr. =

American novelist

- Born: 1947 (age 78–79)
- Occupation: Writer
- Writing career
- Subject: Running

John L. Parker Jr. (born 1947) is an American writer and the author of the cult classic novel Once A Runner and the more recently published Again to Carthage and Racing the Rain. The trilogy chronicles the struggles of Quenton Cassidy, a middle-distance runner.

Cassidy, a passionate, obsessive runner, is first introduced in Once A Runner, published in 1978. Thirty years later Parker follows the career of Cassidy in a second book Again to Carthage, published in late 2007. In "Once a Runner" Cassidy is a college athlete who is suspended from school and prohibited from competing in his university's track meets. He trains in private hoping to compete in disguise. In "Again to Carthage," ten years have passed for Cassidy. After taking a break from running, he begins training again in earnest trying to recapture the feeling and the glory of the past, this time through long-distance running. 2015's "Racing the Rain" recounts Cassidy's early years.

== Once A Runner ==
While neither book ever acquired literary acclaim, Parker—and Quenton Cassidy—achieved a cult following among readers in the running community. Once A Runner is loosely based on Parker's college experience. Parker himself was a tall, lean runner in college, standing 6'4" and weighing about 162 pounds, with a best time of 4:06 for the mile.

Parker attended the University of Florida at Gainesville. While enrolled he was a runner on the Florida Gators track and field team, under head coach Jimmy Carnes, setting the school record in the mile and winning the Southeastern Conference (SEC) championship in the mile run three times before graduating in 1970. He then remained in Gainesville to get his Juris Doctor degree, and continued to run competitively for the Florida Track Club. In the early- to mid-1970s, Gainesville was the Mecca of East Coast distance running because of the Florida Track Club (FTC) and its trio of 1972 Olympians: Frank Shorter, Jack Bacheler and Jeff Galloway. Much of running depicted in Once a Runner is rooted in actual workouts conducted by FTC runners, and others who came to train with them, notably mile champion Marty Liquori. Once A Runner is dedicated: "This book is for Jack Bacheler and Frank Shorter, old friends, great runners. In fond remembrance, fellows, of many Trials and many Miles . . ."

According to a December 31, 2008 article in Slate.com ("Speed Reading: Once a Runner, the best novel ever about distance running"), as of 2007 and 2008, Once A Runner was the most sought-after used book in the United States, according to Bookfinder (the Google of used and out-of-print books). Parker said that since it takes a runner to tell a runner's story, the book actually took eight years to complete, "seven years being a runner, and one year writing the book" in 1978.

Both Once a Runner and Again to Carthage are thick with Gainesville imagery. Cassidy runs in a summer heat so intense that "steam rose from his skin." He grows nostalgic for the scent of "the pepper and earthy decay of Spanish moss and North Florida piney forest."

In a December 23, 2007 interview with The Gainesville Sun newspaper, Parker told Sun staff reporter Amy Reinink that he stayed in town to attend law school after getting his undergraduate degree, and like Cassidy, he moved to South Florida after graduation. For Parker, the move in 1972 was to take an investigative reporting job at the Palm Beach Post, which he left after a few years to open his own legal practice in South Florida. "Then, I realized that my first love was really writing," Parker said. "And like Cassidy does in the book, I began plotting my escape." Parker moved back to Gainesville and finished "Once a Runner" in roughly a year. The only problem: Nobody wanted to publish it.

"I got the rejections, and I kind of went, 'What's wrong with these people? Don't they understand that this is like sending a writer to the moon and having him come back and describe it?' Parker said. "There aren't many writers who get close to a 4-minute mile, or who got to be roommates with an Olympian, and who can tell other people what that's like." Parker started his own publishing house and printed the book himself in 1978. He sold it by dropping off stacks at bookstores and running stores and asking only that they repay him for the books that sold. As recounted to the Sun, Parker slowly became aware that the book was developing a following. "You'd start hearing comments that let you know that it had become at least a cult thing, that there was this small, hard-core group that was really into it," Parker said. "People would tell me, 'I've read this book 10 times,' or, 'I had this book years ago, but I lent it out and someone stole it.'

In a 23 October 2007 interview with Runners World magazine, to promote Again to Carthage, Parker discussed how he came to write Once a Runner. He didn't just write the novel, he formed his own publishing company and even set the type himself. The friend who helped design the cover let Parker use the equipment when his printing shop closed. "I worked through the night sometimes making editorial changes as I went along," said Parker. "You type a line and you hit a button and it goes thunk and prints it on the photographic paper. Then you have to cut up errors with an X-Acto knife. I was working in a fever most of the time, so excited to be getting it done. I was thinking how much runners were going to like it," Parker said. "There's stuff about training in there, there's stuff about running history, there's stuff about physiology and biology. It was like cutting the top off my head and pouring out everything about running that was in there into this thing and just making sure it wove into the plotline." Having printed 5,000 copies, Parker then dispatched the novel to running-shoe stores.

== Books ==
=== Fiction ===
- Parker, John L., Once a Runner, Cedarwinds Publishing Co., Cedar Mountain, North Carolina (1978).
- Parker, John L., Again to Carthage, Breakaway Books, New York, New York (2007). ISBN 978-1-891369-77-3.
- Parker, John L., Racing the Rain, Scribner, New York, New York (2015). ISBN 978-1476769868.

=== Non-fiction ===
- Liquori, Marty, and John L. Parker, Marty Liquori's Guide for the Elite Runner, Playboy Press, Chicago, Illinois (1980). ISBN 978-0-87223-625-7.
- Parker, John L., Heart Monitor Training for the Compleat Idiot, Cedarwinds Publishing, Tallahassee, Florida (1998). ISBN 978-0-915297-25-2.
- Audain, Anne, and John L. Parker, Uncommon Heart, Cedarwinds Publishing, Tallahassee, Florida (2000).
- Parker, John L., Runners & Other Dreamers, Cedarwinds Publishing, Tallahassee, Florida (1989).

== See also ==
- Florida Gators
- List of University of Florida alumni
