= Honolulu Marathon =

Annual race in the United States held since 1973

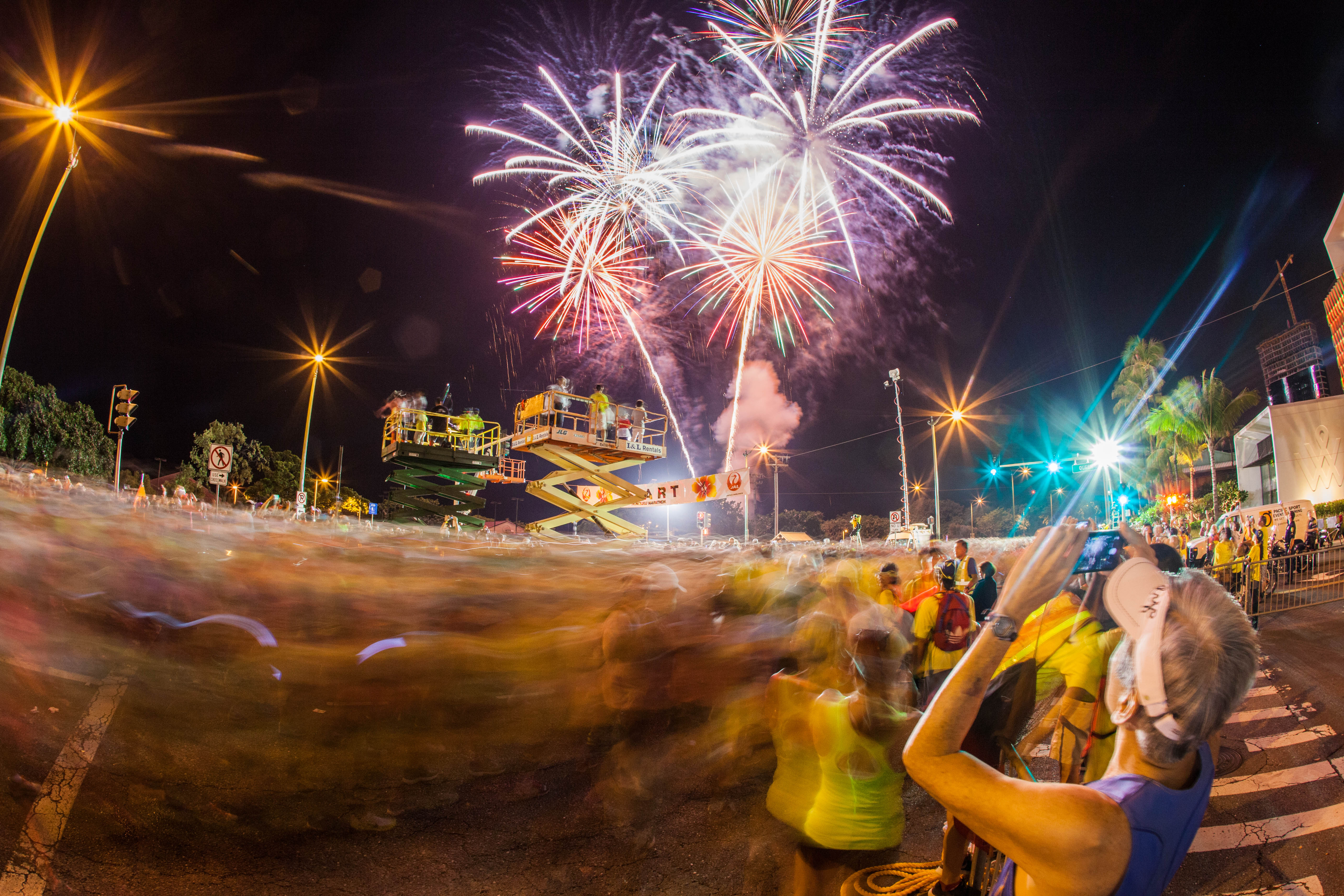
- Start of the Honolulu Marathon in 2015
- Date: Second Sunday in December
- Location: Honolulu, Hawaii, US
- Event type: Road
- Distance: Marathon
- Primary sponsor: Japan Airlines (JAL)
- Established: 1973 (53 years ago)
- Course records: Men: 2:07:59 (2019); Titus Ekiru; Women: 2:22:15 (2017); Brigid Kosgei
- Website: honolulumarathon.org
- Participants: 18,805 finishers (2019); 19,749 finishers (2018)

The Honolulu Marathon (branded JAL Honolulu Marathon for sponsorship reasons) is a marathon (26.2 miles or 42.2 km) in Honolulu, Hawaii. It was first held on December 16, 1973, and it typically takes places on the second Sunday in December. The marathon is popular for its tropical location in Hawaii, and is also popular among first-time marathoners, many of whom are visitors from Japan. Japan Air Lines has been the title sponsor of the race since 1985.

About 20,000 runners finish the Honolulu Marathon each year, and it is one of the five largest marathons in the United States. Entry to the Honolulu Marathon is open to anyone, and there is neither a lottery nor a set of qualifying times. There is also no time limit to finish the course. From 1973 to 2006, more than 585,000 runners have started the Honolulu Marathon, with over 482,000 finishers, for a finishing rate of over 82%.

== History ==
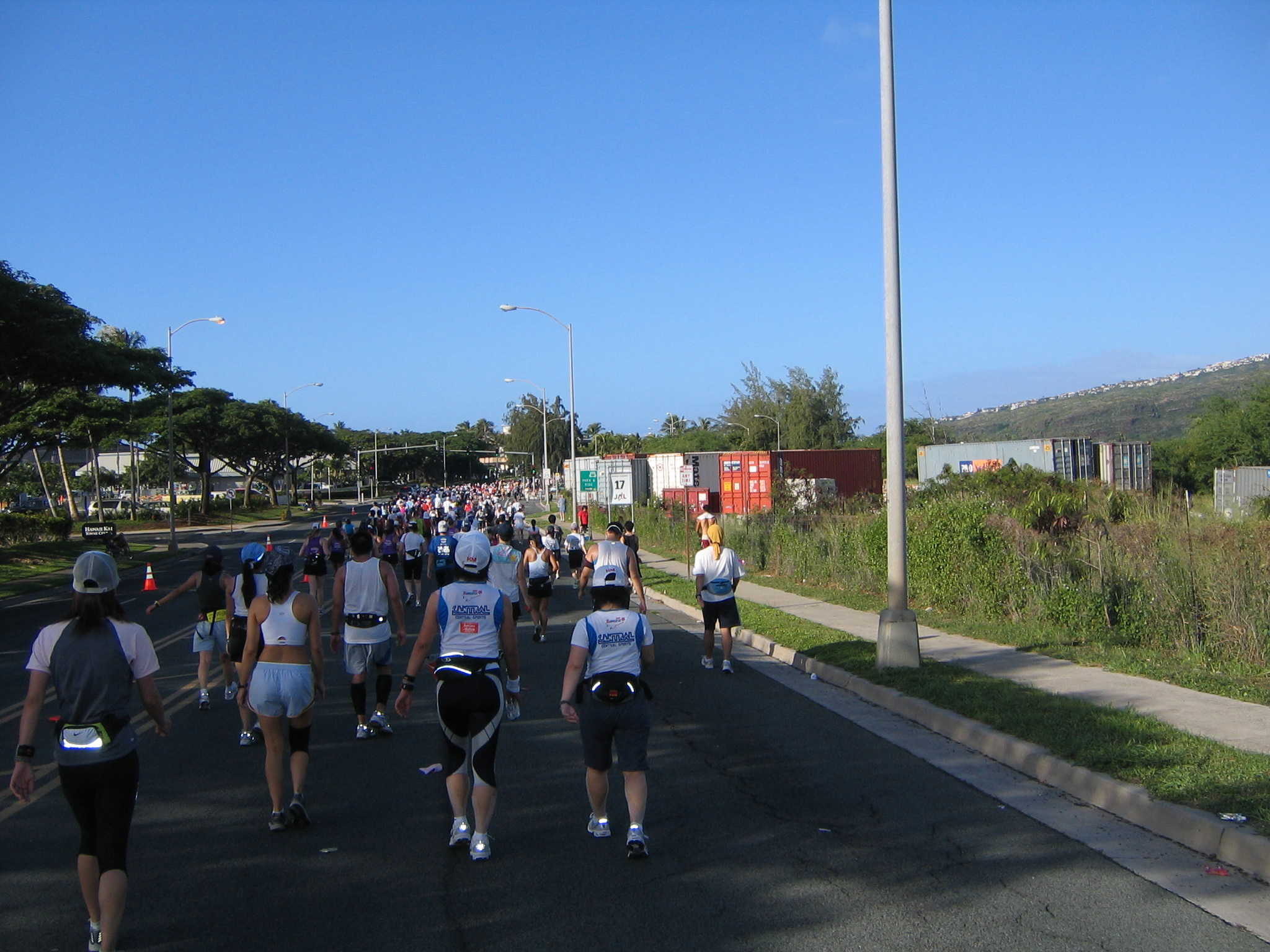
Honolulu Marathon 2006

The race was first organized by Former Honolulu Mayor Frank Fasi in 1973, taking an interest in organizing the race after observing the Boston Marathon and the positive impact that came with the race.

During its formative period (1973–1978) the Honolulu Marathon doubled in size every year—a rate that has been equaled only once.

At the forefront of the growth of the Honolulu Marathon was cardiologist Jack Scaff, one of the first physicians to prescribe running as therapy for heart disease. In 1977, Sports Illustrated's senior writer and Olympic marathoner Kenny Moore wrote a feature story about the race. Moore postured that, like the growth of long-distance running itself, the race's success came about not simply from an interest in competition, but from a quest for personal longevity and an enhanced quality of life. That article was soon followed by the book The Honolulu Marathon, by journalist Mark Hazard Osmun; the book was a revelatory chronicle of the then-unfolding social craze coined the "Running Boom," as exemplified in the Honolulu event.

Over time, the race grew and changed, luring large corporate sponsors and paying substantial prize money to the winners. In 1995, the Honolulu Marathon enjoyed the distinction of being the world's largest marathon when it drew 34,434 entrants and had 27,022 finishers.

Unique to the Honolulu Marathon among American marathons is its popularity among runners from Japan, where there are very few marathons open to all entrants. In recent years, the majority of entrants have been visitors from Japan; notably in 2008, 14,406 of the total 23,231 entries were from Japan, making up nearly 62.0 percent of the field. The marathon is so popular that the Honolulu Marathon Association maintains an office in Tokyo to process entries.

In 2007, race organizers switched from the ChampionChip timing system they had used since 2000 to a new system from SAI which utilized a smaller, lighter, chip implanted in a strip of paper. For a myriad of reasons that are not entirely clear (heavy rains, improper usage, failed generators), the timing devices apparently failed to accurately record the start, split and finish times of all 24,300 participants, forcing race officials to manually review finish line video tape of all 24,000+ runners in order to confirm their correct finishing times. The same year, Ethiopian Ambesse Tolossa was disqualified as the men's champion because the U.S. Anti-Doping Agency found he had a banned substance in his system.

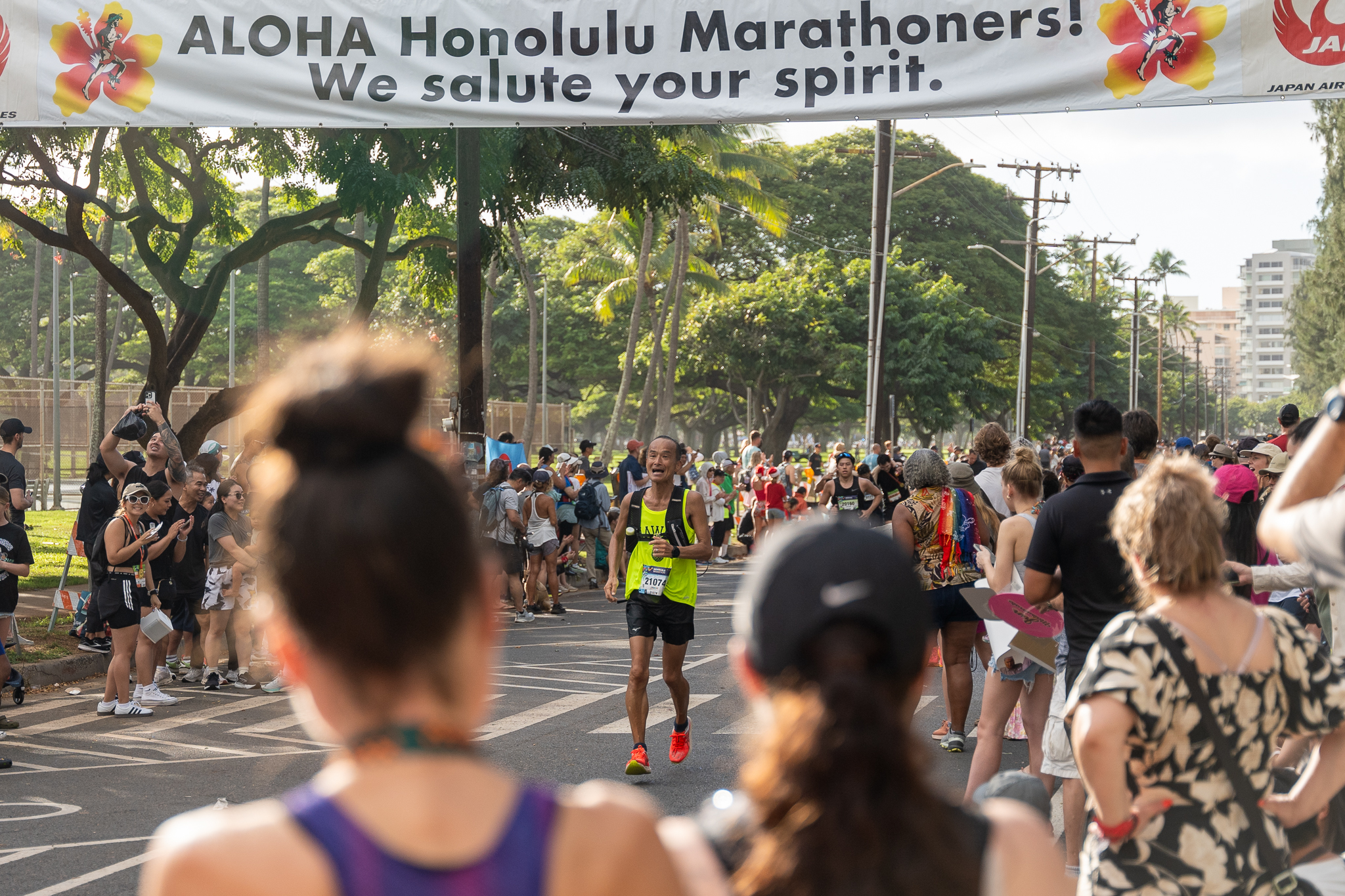
Honolulu Marathon 2024 Participant near the finish line

The 2012 Honolulu Marathon was held on Sunday, December 9, 2012. The field for the 40th Honolulu Marathon reached 30,898 entries at the marathon expo at the Hawaii Convention Center. 16,067 of those registered entrants were from Japan. The 2012 marathon was the largest in 15 years, and the second largest in America of 2012, only surpassed by the Chicago Marathon.

Organizers decided not to hold the 2020 in-person edition of the race on its original date in December due to the coronavirus pandemic, but reserved the option to postpone it to an alternate date in the first half of 2021. All registrants were given the option of running the race virtually or transferring their entry to 2021. (Note: If the 2020 marathon is to be held on an alternate date, this would result in the possibility of both the 2020 and 2021 Honolulu Marathons being held in 2021, and registrants who did not run the race virtually would have the option of transferring their entry to either the (postponed) 2020 marathon, or the 2021 marathon.)

In 2022, 92-year-old Mathea Allansmith completed the Honolulu Marathon with a time of 11:19:49, earning a Guinness World Record as the oldest woman to have completed any marathon.

=== Satellite races in Iraq and Afghanistan ===
The Honolulu Marathon has been popular with U.S. military personnel stationed in Hawaii. With many Hawaii-based troops deployed abroad, the marathon coordinated with the military to organize satellite marathon races on U.S. bases in Iraq and Afghanistan on the same day as the main race, with finishers receiving the same T-shirts and medals. The first such race was held in 2004 at a U.S. base in Tarin Kowt, Afghanistan. In 2005, the marathon organized a similar race at Camp Victory in Baghdad.

On Dec. 12, 2010, the 43rd Sustainment Brigade, home stationed in Fort Carson, Colorado, now deployed to Kandahar Air Field, Afghanistan, organized a satellite run on the base. Nearly 135 people from several different nations participated in the run.

== Course ==
Starting near Ala Moana Beach Park across from Ala Moana Center, the course progresses west along the waterfront toward downtown Honolulu, then loops through downtown and bends back east through Waikiki, around Diamond Head, and out toward the eastern suburbs of Honolulu, winding through Hawaii Kai before doubling back toward the finish line at Waikiki's Kapiolani Park. Marathoners consider the course moderately difficult because of the tropical weather conditions, with temperatures starting at around 65 °F (18 °C) and rising to as high as 80 °F (27 °C), and a relatively hilly course compared with other marathons. Nevertheless, the race also remains a popular choice for first-time marathoners.

== Winners ==
Although the difficulty of the course precludes world-record pace performances, winners of the Honolulu Marathon have used it as a stepping stone to greater achievements. For instance, three-time winner Ibrahim Hussein of Kenya later won the Boston Marathon three times; and 1993 winner Bong-Ju Lee won the silver medal and 1995 winner Josia Thugwane won the gold medal, both in the 1996 Olympic Marathon in Atlanta.

Key: Course record (in bold)

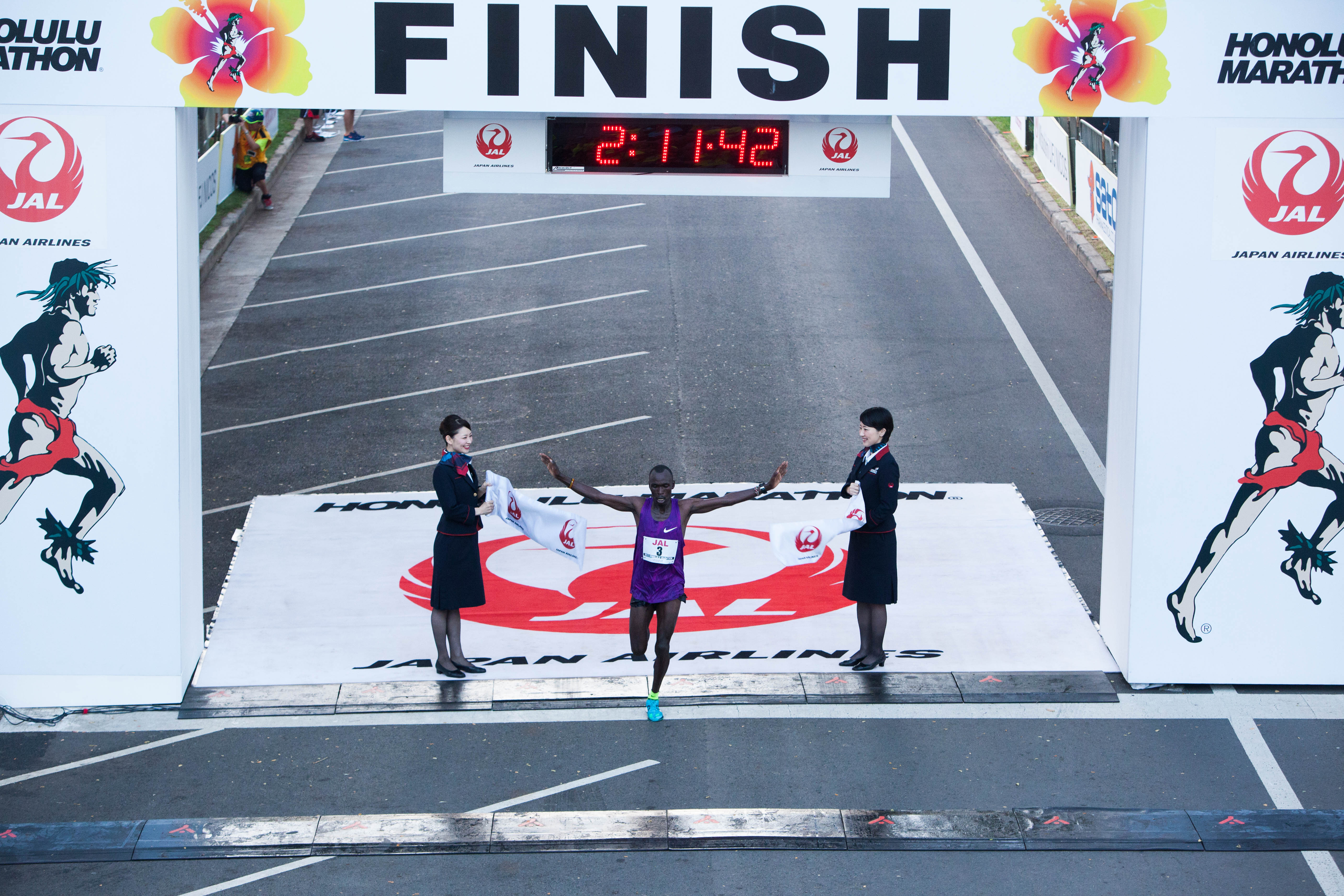
Filex Kiprotich, the winner in 2015

Year	Male Winner	Time	Female Winner	Time	Rf.
1973	Duncan Macdonald (USA) (Note: From Hawaii)	2:27:34	June Chun (USA)	3:25:31	
1974	Jeff Galloway (USA) (Note: From Georgia)	2:23:02	Cindy Dalrymple (USA)	3:01:59	
1975	Jack Foster (NZL)	2:17:24	Jacqueline Hansen (USA) (Note: From California)	2:49:24	
1976	Duncan Macdonald (USA)	2:20:37	Kim Merritt (USA) (Note: From Wisconsin)	2:44:44	
1977	Jeff Wells (USA) (Note: From Texas)	2:18:38	Cindy Dalrymple (USA)	2:48:08	
1978	Don Kardong (USA) (Note: From Washington)	2:17:05	Patti Lyons (USA) (Note: From Massachusetts)	2:43:10	
1979	Dean Matthews (USA) (Note: From South Carolina)	2:16:13	Patti Lyons (USA)	2:40:07	
1980	Duncan Macdonald (USA)	2:16:55	Patti Lyons Catalano (USA)	2:35:26	
1981	Jon Anderson (USA) (Note: From Oregon)	2:16:54	Patti Lyons Catalano (USA)	2:33:24	
1982	Dave Gordon (USA)	2:15:30	Eileen Claugus (USA)	2:41:11	
1983	Kevin Ryan (NZL)	2:20:19	Annick Loir-Lebreton (FRA)	2:41:25	
1984	Jorge González (PRI)	2:16:25	Patti Gray (USA)	2:42:50	
1985	Ibrahim Hussein (KEN)	2:12:08	Carla Beurskens (NED)	2:35:51	
1986	Ibrahim Hussein (KEN)	2:11:43	Carla Beurskens (NED)	2:31:01	
1987	Ibrahim Hussein (KEN)	2:18:26	Carla Beurskens (NED)	2:35:11	
1988	Gianni Poli (ITA)	2:12:47	Cyndie Welte (USA) (Note: From Ohio)	2:41:52	
1989	Simon Robert Naali (TAN)	2:11:47	Carla Beurskens (NED)	2:31:50	
1990	Simon Robert Naali (TAN)	2:17:29	Carla Beurskens (NED)	2:33:34	
1991	Benson Masya (KEN)	2:18:24	Ritva Lemettinen (FIN)	2:40:11	
1992	Benson Masya (KEN)	2:14:19	Carla Beurskens (NED)	2:32:13	
1993	Lee Bong-Ju (KOR)	2:13:16	Carla Beurskens (NED)	2:32:20	
1994	Benson Masya (KEN)	2:15:04	Carla Beurskens (NED)	2:37:06	
1995	Josia Thugwane (RSA)	2:16:08	Colleen De Reuck (RSA)	2:37:29	
1996	Eric Kimaiyo (KEN)	2:13:23	Ramilya Burangulova (RUS)	2:34:28	
1997	Eric Kimaiyo (KEN)	2:12:17	Svetlana Zakharova (RUS)	2:33:14	
1998	Mbarak Kipkorir Hussein (KEN)	2:14:53	Irina Bogachova (KGZ)	2:33:27	
1999	Jimmy Muindi (KEN)	2:16:45	Irina Bogachova (KGZ)	2:32:36	
2000	Jimmy Muindi (KEN)	2:15:19	Lyubov Morgunova (RUS)	2:28:33	
2001	Mbarak Kipkorir Hussein (KEN)	2:15:09	Lyubov Morgunova (RUS)	2:29:54	
2002	Mbarak Kipkorir Hussein (KEN)	2:12:29	Svetlana Zakharova (RUS)	2:29:08	
2003	Jimmy Muindi (KEN)	2:12:59	Eri Hayakawa (JPN)	2:31:56	
2004	Jimmy Muindi (KEN)	2:11:12	Lyubov Morgunova (RUS)	2:27:33	
2005	Jimmy Muindi (KEN)	2:12:00	Olesya Nurgalieva (RUS)	2:30:24	
2006	Ambesse Tolosa (ETH)	2:13:42	Lyubov Denisova (RUS)	2:27:19	
2007	Jimmy Muindi (KEN)	2:18:53	Alevtina Biktimirova (RUS)	2:33:07	
2008	Patrick Ivuti (KEN)	2:14:35	Kiyoko Shimahara (JPN)	2:32:36	
2009	Patrick Ivuti (KEN)	2:12:14	Svetlana Zakharova (RUS)	2:28:34	
2010	Nicholas Chelimo (KEN)	2:15:18	Belaynesh Zemedkun (ETH)	2:32:13	
2011	Nicholas Chelimo (KEN)	2:14:55	Woynishet Girma (ETH)	2:31:41	
2012	Wilson Kipsang (KEN)	2:12:31	Valentina Galimova (RUS)	2:31:23	
2013	Gilbert Chepkwony (KEN)	2:18:46	Ehitu Kiros (ETH)	2:36:02	
2014	Wilson Chebet (KEN)	2:15:35	Joyce Chepkirui (KEN)	2:30:23	
2015	Filex Kiprotich (KEN)	2:11:42	Joyce Chepkirui (KEN)	2:28:34	
2016	Lawrence Cherono (KEN)	2:09:39	Brigid Kosgei (KEN)	2:31:11	
2017	Lawrence Cherono (KEN)	2:08:27	Brigid Kosgei (KEN)	**2:22:15**	
2018	Titus Ekiru (KEN)	2:09:01	Vivian Jerono Kiplagat (KEN)	2:36:22	
2019	Titus Ekiru (KEN)	**2:07:59**	Margaret Muriuki (KEN)	2:31:09	
2020	suspended due to coronavirus pandemic (Note: It is unclear whether the marathon would be postponed or cancelled.)				
2021	Emmanuel Saina (KEN)	2:14:30	Lanni Marchant (CAN)	2:41:24	
2022	Asefa Mengstu (ETH)	2:14:40	Asayech Ayalew Bere (ETH)	2:30:58	
2023	Paul Lonyangata (KEN)	2:15:41	Cynthia Jerotich Limo (KEN)	2:33:01	
2024	Yemane Halieselassie (ERI)	2:11:59	Cynthia Jerotich Limo (KEN)	2:31:13	
2025	Tsegay Weldlibanos (ERI)	2:13:39	Calli Hauger-Thackery (GRB)	2:30:44	

== Deaths ==
- 1993 Kunihiko Kono, 51
- 2002 Grant Hirohata-Goto, 33
