= Jacqueline Hansen =

American long-distance runner

Jacqueline Hansen (born November 20, 1948) is a former long-distance runner from the United States who is recognized by the International Association of Athletics Federations as having set a world best in the marathon on two occasions.

== Biography ==
Hansen set a world best mark on December 1, 1974, with a 2:43:55 performance at the Western Hemisphere Marathon in Culver City, California, then recaptured it from Christa Vahlensieck of West Germany on October 12, 1975, with 2:38:19 at the Nike OTC Marathon in Eugene, Oregon. (Note: The International Association of Athletics Federations notes Hansen's official time on December 1, 1974, as 2:43:54.5 whereas the Association of Road Racing Statisticians notes it as 2:43:54.6) With these two performances, she was ranked first in women's marathon for 1974 and 1975.

Hansen won 12 of her first 15 marathons. Among these victories, she won the prestigious Boston Marathon in 1973, the Honolulu Marathon in 1975, and the Avenue of the Giants Marathon in 1976. Hansen is also a three-time winner of the Western Hemisphere Marathon (1972, 1974, 1977) and the Catalina Marathon (1979, 1981, 1982).

At the 1987 World Masters Athletics Championships in Melbourne, Australia, Hansen won titles in the 1,500 meters and the 5,000 meters.

Hansen was the president of a group, the International Runners Committee, that successfully lobbied the International Olympic Committee to add women's events for the 5,000 meters, the 10,000 meters, and the marathon.

Hansen was a member of the Los Angeles Track Club, 1970-1972; Southern California Striders, 1973-1974; San Fernando Valley Track Club, 1974-1983 & 1987-1993; and Oregon Track Club 1983-1987. After her competitive running career, Hansen worked for the Amateur Athletic Foundation of Los Angeles, and coached an all women's running team called "See Jane Run" (later known as "The Janes") to multiple USA Cross Country Championships.

Hansen attended Granada Hills High School and Los Angeles Pierce College, and is a 1974 graduate of California State University, Northridge.

== Achievements ==
- All results regarding marathon, unless stated otherwise

Year	Competition	Venue	Position	Notes
Representing the United States
1972	Western Hemisphere Marathon	Culver City, CA	1st	3:15:53
1973	Boston Marathon	Boston, United States	1st	3:05:59
1973	AIAW Collegiate National Track & Field Championships (Mile)	Hayward, CA	1st	4:54.0
1974	Masters Track & Field Meet, Chapman College (6-mile)	Orange County, CA	1st	34:24 (world best mark)
1974	International Women's Marathon Championships	Waldniel, West Germany	5th overall, 1st American	2:56:25
1974	15 km Florence Road Race	Florence, Italy	1st	52:15 world best mark
1974	Western Hemisphere Marathon	Culver City, CA	1st	2:43:54 World Record
1975	Nike OTC Marathon	Eugene, Oregon	1st	2:38:10 World Record
1975	Honolulu Marathon	Honolulu, Hawaii	1st	2:49:24
1976	Avenue of the Giants Marathon	Eureka, CA	1st	2:50:18
1977	Western Hemisphere Marathon	Culver City, CA	1st	2:50:33
1978	AAU National 50-Mile Championships	Santa Monica College, CA	1st	7:14:58 (11 intermediate world records)
1978	Revco-Cleveland Marathon	Cleveland, OH	1st	2:46:59 course record
1979	Catalina Marathon	Catalina Island, CA	1st	3:26:00 course record
1981	Catalina Marathon	Catalina Island, CA	1st	3:23:40 course record
1982	Catalina Marathon	Catalina Island, CA	1st	3:26:19
1984	US Olympic Marathon Trials	Olympia, WA		
1987	TAC USA Masters National Track & Field Championships	Eugene, OR	1st 35-39 Div.	5,000m
1987	World Veterans Track & Field Championships	Melbourne, Australia	1st 35-39 Div. 1st 35-39 Div.	1500m-4:42.0 5000m-17:43.10

== Honors and Organizations ==
- 1976 Race Director, Women's National AAU Marathon Championships, Western Hemisphere, Culver City, CA.
- 1977 Race Director, Women's National AAU 10K Road Race Championships, Bonne Belle 10K, Beverly Hills, CA.
- 1979-1981 Women's SPA-AAU & SPA-TAC Long-Distance Running Chair.
- 1979-1980 Athletes’ Representative to Executive Board, The Athletics Congress (TAC-USA).
- 1979-1986 Former President, Executive Director, International Runners’ Committee.
- 1980 Advisory Board Member, American Running & Fitness Association.
- 1980-1987 Member, Road Runners Club of America Women's Distance Committee.
- 1981-1990 Board of Directors, American Road Racing Association.
- 1984 Event Coordinator, Exhibition Women's 5,000m & 10,000m, USA Olympic Track & Field Trials, Los Angeles, CA.
- 1984 Athletes’ Representative to International Amateur Athletic Federation (IAAF) Cross-Country & Road Racing Committee.
- 1984 American Civil Liberties Union (ACLU) of Southern California, Annual Award for Leadership.
- 1984 Road Runners Club of America (RRCA), Hall of Fame Inductee.
- 1984 The Athletics Congress-USA Annual Recognition Award, “Woman of the Year”.
- 1984 Chairwoman, International Competition Subcommittee of TAC-USA Women's Long Distance Running Committee (WLDRC).
- 1986, 1987, 1989 USA Team Manager, International Women's Ekiden, Yokohama, Japan.
- 1987 USA Head Coach, Women's Marathon Team, Taipei International Marathon, Taiwan.
- 1988 USA Team Leader, IAAF Women's International 15K Championships, Monte Carlo, Monaco.
- 1988 Athletic Hall of Fame Inductee, California State University, Northridge.
- 1988-1991 TAC-USA, WLDRC Site Selection Sub-Committee Chairwoman for the 1992 Women's Olympic Marathon Trials.
- 1989-1991 TAC-Southern California Association WLDR Chairwoman.
- 1990-1991 TAC-SCA Board of Directors, Vice President.
- 1997 L.A. Pierce College's “50 Distinguished Alumni” for celebration of Pierce's 50th Anniversary.
- 1999 USA Team Head Coach, Women's & Men's Team, International Ekiden, Chiba, Japan.
- 2004 Lifetime Achievement Award, Southern California Association-USATF.

== Notes ==
Records
Preceded by (France) Chantal Langlacé (West Germany) Christa Vahlensieck	Women's Marathon World Record Holder; 1 December 1974 – 21 April 1975; 12 October 1975 – 1 May 1977	Succeeded by (West Germany) Liane Winter (France) Chantal Langlacé
