= Christa Vahlensieck =

German long-distance runner

Christa Vahlensieck (née Kofferschläger; born 27 May 1949) is a German former long distance runner and pioneer in the marathon for women. During her running career, from 1973 to 1989, she simultaneously achieved a world record in the 10,000 metres, in the 25k road race and the marathon; she holds 17 German championship titles.

== Biography ==
On 28 October 1973, Vahlensieck became the first German woman to complete the marathon in under three hours (2:59:26), as a youth in a German Forestrun. She set another German record (2:53:00) at the Boston Marathon on 15 April 1974. Both times were also European bests.

In the same year, she won the Essen Marathon in 2:42:38. The time was not recognized as a world record because the course was 745 m too short.

On 3 May 1975, she succeeded at setting the world record at Dülmen with a time of 2:40:16. In the same year, she was the first German winner at the Schwarzwald Marathon in 2:45:43, a time that still stands as the course record.

On 10 September 1977, her victory at the Berlin Marathon in 2:34:48 gave her another world record.

At the 1983 World Championship in Helsinki she placed 19th (2:40:43).

From 1973 to 1989, she won 21 marathons, among them the 1977 Berlin Marathon, five times at the Košice Peace Marathon (1981, 1984, 1986 - 1988) and the 1989 Vienna Marathon. In 1988 Vahlensieck ran in the special event "Friendship Run Wuppertal-Košice", a course over 1765 km, trespassing the Iron Curtain: "an awesome experience", as she remembers.

== Other Records ==
- World record in the hour run: 16,872 meters, 24 May 1975 in Bochum
- World record in the 10000 metres: 34:01.4, 20 August 1975 in Wolfsburg
- World record in the 20000 metres: 1:10:50.2, 25 October 1975 in Essen
- Four world records in 25km road race: 1:31:52, 23 March 1975 in Düren; 1:31:01, 13 September 1975 in Rheydt; 2 May 1976 in Ameln; 1:28:33, 22 November 1978 in Griesheim
- World record in the Marathon: 2:40:15.8, 3 May 1975 in Dülmen; 2:34:47.5 10 September 1977 in Berlin
- German Record in 100km run: 7:50:37, 4 September 1976 in Unna

She won 11 West German national titles:

- in Marathon: 1975, 1976, 1977, 1978 and 1980
- in 25 Kilometer Road race: 1977, 1978, 1979 and 1980
- in 15-Kilometer Road race: 1988
- in Cross country 1978

== Achievements ==
| Year | Competition | Venue | Position | Event | Notes |
Representing West Germany
| 1977 | Berlin Marathon | Berlin, West Germany | 1st | Marathon | 2:34:48 |
| 1982 | Osaka Ladies Marathon | Osaka, Japan | 3rd | Marathon | 2:34:42 |
| 1983 | World Championships | Helsinki, Finland | 19th | Marathon | 2:40:43 |
| 1983 | New York City Marathon | New York City, United States | 6th | Marathon | 2:35:59 |
| 1986 | California International Marathon | Sacramento, United States | 1st | Marathon | 2:39:31 |
| 1986 | New York City Marathon | New York City, United States | 9th | Marathon | 2:38:12 |
| 1989 | Vienna Marathon | Vienna, Austria | 1st | Marathon | 2:34:47 |

Records
| Preceded by (West Germany) Liane Winter (France) Chantal Langlacé | Women's Marathon World Record Holder; 3 May 1975 – 12 October 1975; 10 September 1977 – 22 October 1978 | Succeeded by (United States) Jacqueline Hansen (Norway) Grete Waitz |
