= Chantal Langlacé =

French long-distance runner

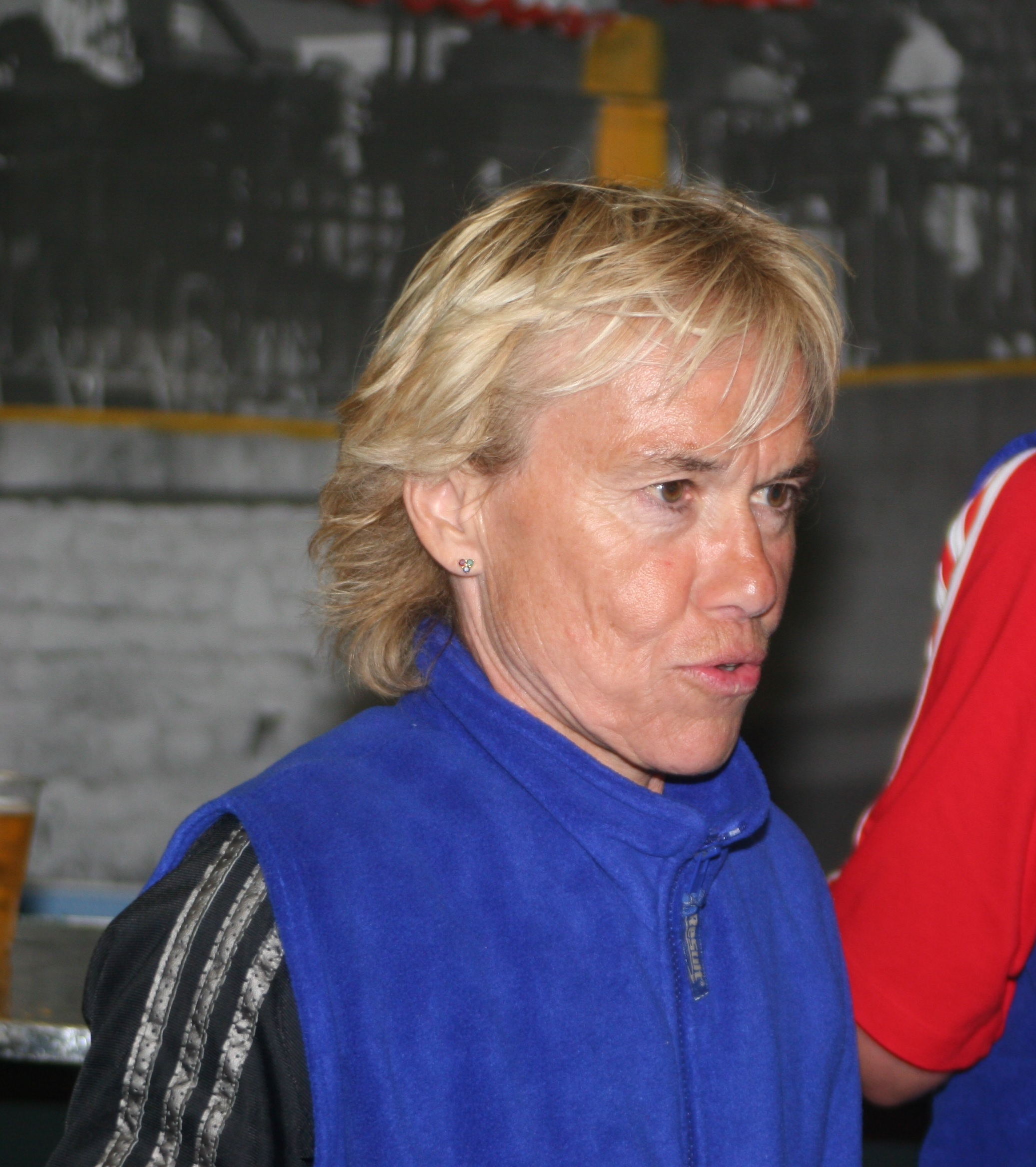
Chantal Langlacé

Chantal Langlacé (born 6 January 1955) is a French long-distance runner who is recognized by the International Association of Athletics Federations as having set a world best in the marathon on two occasions. Langlacé set a world best mark on 27 October 1974 with a 2:46:24 performance in Neuf-Brisach, France, then recaptured it from American Jacqueline Hansen on 1 May 1977 with 2:35:16 in Oiartzun, Spain.

Langlacé earned a national title in the 25 kilometers and set five national records in the marathon, as well as one each in the half marathon, the 25 kilometers, the 100 kilometers, and the one hour run. She competed in the women's marathon at the 1983 World Championships, but failed to finish. Langlacé is a three-time champion of the Neuf Brisach Marathon. In addition to her record setting performance there in 1974, she also won in 1973 and 1976. Langlacé won the Paris Marathon in 1981 as well as the Lille Métropole Marathon, now run as the Lille Métropole Half Marathon, in 1986 and 1987.

== Achievements ==
Year	Competition	Venue	Position	Event	Notes
Representing France
1981	Paris Marathon	Paris, France	1st	Marathon	2:48:24
1983	World Championships	Helsinki, Finland	—	Marathon	DNF
1985	Reims Marathon	Reims, France	1st	Marathon	2:42:18
1986	Lille Marathon	Lille, France	1st	Marathon	2:33:58
1987	Lille Marathon	Lille, France	1st	Marathon	2:41:43

Records
Preceded by (United States) Michiko Gorman (United States) Jacqueline Hansen	Women's Marathon World Record Holder; 27 October 1974 – 1 December 1974; 1 May 1977 – 10 September 1977	Succeeded by (United States) Jacqueline Hansen (West Germany) Christa Vahlensieck
